= 1922 Campeonato de Portugal =

Tournament details
- Country: Portugal
- Dates: 4 June 1922 – 18 June 1922
- Teams: 2

Final positions
- Champions: Porto (1st title)
- Runners-up: Sporting CP

Tournament statistics
- Matches played: 3
- Goals scored: 9 (3 per match)
- Top goal scorer(s): Emílio Ramos; José Bastos (2 goals)

The 1922 Campeonato de Portugal was the 1st edition of the Portuguese football knockout tournament, organized by the Portuguese Football Federation (FPF). The regional champions from the Algarve, Lisbon, Madeira, Porto FAs were invited to take part in this newly formed tournament. Due to organizational and financial problems, the Algarve and Madeira FAs could not participate and, thus, the competition only fixtured two teams: the Lisbon champions, Sporting CP; and the Porto champions, FC Porto.

The winner of the inaugural Campeonato de Portugal was determined by a 'best-of-three' series. Porto won the first game 2–1 which was held at the Campo da Constituição. Sporting CP won the second match 2–0 which would force both sides to a third game where Porto won the game 3–1 to clinch the first Campeonato de Portugal.

== Final ==
1922 Campeonato de Portugal Final
- Event: Campeonato de Portugal
Porto	Sporting CP
3	1
- The final was taken to a third game, after each side had won one game a piece.

First game
Porto	Sporting CP
2	1
- Date: 4 June 1922
- Venue: Campo da Constituição, Porto
- Referee: Merick Barley (England)

Second game
Sporting CP	Porto
2	0
- Date: 11 June 1922
- Venue: Estádio do Campo Grande, Lisbon
- Referee: Ezequiel Montero (Spain)

The 1922 Campeonato de Portugal Final was the final match of the 1922 Campeonato de Portugal, the 1st season of the Campeonato de Portugal, the Portuguese football knockout tournament, organized by the Portuguese Football Federation (FPF). Due to organizational and financial problems, the Algarve and Madeira FAs could not participate and, thus, the competition only fixtured two teams: Sporting CP, the Lisbon Champions, and FC Porto, the Porto champions.

The winner of the inaugural Campeonato de Portugal was determined by a 'best-of-three' series. After a 1–1 series tie, the third and final game took place at a neutral venue, the Campo do Bessa, where Porto defeated Sporting CP 3–1 to win the first Campeonato de Portugal.

=== First game ===
4 June 1922

Porto	2 – 1	Sporting CP
Bastos 25', 86'		Ramos 9'

Campo da Constituição, Porto
Referee: Merick Barley (England)

Porto	Sporting CP

GK	1	(Portugal) Lino Moreira
DF		(Portugal) Artur Augusto
DF		(Portugal) Júlio Cardoso
DF		(Portugal) José Bastos
DF		(Portugal) Alexandre Cal
MF		(Portugal) Floreano Pereira
MF		(Portugal) Velez Carneiro
MF		(Portugal) José Mota
FW		(Portugal) João Brito (c)
FW		(Portugal) Balbino Silva
FW		(Portugal) João Nunes
Substitutes:
Manager:
(France) Adolphe Cassaigne

GK	1	(Portugal) Amadeu Cruz
DF		(Portugal) Joaquim Ferreira
DF		(Portugal) José Leandro
DF		(Portugal) Jorge Vieira
MF		(Portugal) Henrique Portela
MF		(Portugal) José Filipe
FW		(Portugal) Emílio Ramos
FW		(Portugal) Alfredo Torres Pereira
FW		(Portugal) Francisco Stromp (c)
FW		(Portugal) Francisco Marques
FW		(Portugal) João Francisco Maia
Substitutes:
Manager:
(Germany) Augusto Sabbo

Match officials

- Assistant referees:
- Fourth official:

Match rules

- 90 minutes.
- Maximum of two substitutions

=== Second game ===
11 June 1922

Sporting CP	2 – 0	Porto
Portela; Pereira

Estádio do Campo Grande, Lisbon
Referee: Ezequiel Montero (Spain)

GK	1	(Portugal) Amadeu Cruz
DF		(Portugal) Joaquim Ferreira (c)
DF		(Portugal) José Leandro
DF		(Portugal) Jorge Vieira
MF		(Portugal) Henrique Portela
MF		(Portugal) José Filipe
FW		(Portugal) Emílio Ramos
FW		(Portugal) Alfredo Torres Pereira
FW		(Portugal) Francisco Stromp
FW		(Portugal) Jaime Gonçalves
FW		(Portugal) João Francisco Maia
Substitutes:
Manager:
(Germany) Augusto Sabbo

GK	1	(Portugal) Lino Moreira
DF		(Portugal) Artur Augusto
DF		(Portugal) Júlio Cardoso
DF		(Portugal) José Bastos
DF		(Portugal) Alexandre Cal
MF		(Portugal) Floreano Pereira
MF		(Portugal) Velez Carneiro
MF		(Portugal) José Mota
FW		(Portugal) João Brito (c)
FW		(Portugal) Balbino Silva
FW		(Portugal) João Nunes
Substitutes:
Manager:
(France) Adolphe Cassaigne

Match officials

- Assistant referees:
- Fourth official:

Match rules

- 90 minutes.
- Maximum of two substitutions

=== Third game ===
18 June 1922

Porto	3 – 1 (a.e.t.)	Sporting CP
Balbino 51'; Nunes 100'; Brito 102'		Ramos 70'

Campo do Bessa, Porto
Referee: Neves Eugénio (Portugal)

GK	1	(Portugal) Lino Moreira
DF		(Portugal) Artur Augusto
DF		(Portugal) Júlio Cardoso
DF		(Portugal) José Bastos
DF		(Portugal) Alexandre Cal
MF		(Portugal) Floreano Pereira
MF		(Portugal) Velez Carneiro
MF		(Portugal) José Mota
FW		(Portugal) João Brito (c)
FW		(Portugal) Balbino Silva
FW		(Portugal) João Nunes
Substitutes:
Manager:
(France) Adolphe Cassaigne

GK	1	(Portugal) Amadeu Cruz
DF		(Portugal) Joaquim Ferreira
DF		(Portugal) José Leandro
DF		(Portugal) Jorge Vieira
MF		(Portugal) Henrique Portela
MF		(Portugal) Filipe dos Santos
FW		(Portugal) Emílio Ramos
FW		(Portugal) Alfredo Torres Pereira
FW		(Portugal) Francisco Stromp (c)
FW		(Portugal) Francisco Marques
FW		(Portugal) João Francisco Maia
Substitutes:
Manager:
(Germany) Augusto Sabbo

1922 Campeonato de Portugal Winners
Porto
1st Title

Match officials

- Assistant referees:

Match rules

- 90 minutes.
- 30 minutes of extra time if necessary.
- Maximum of two substitutions

== See also ==
- FC Porto–Sporting CP rivalry
