= 1925 Campeonato de Portugal final =

- Event: 1924–25 Campeonato de Portugal
Porto	Sporting CP
2	1
- Date: 28 June 1925
- Venue: Campo de Monserrate, Viana do Castelo
- Referee: Rafael Núñez (Spain)

The 1925 Campeonato de Portugal Final was the final match of the 1924–25 Campeonato de Portugal, the 4th season of the Campeonato de Portugal, the Portuguese football knockout tournament, organized by the Portuguese Football Federation (FPF). The match was played on 28 June 1925 at the Campo de Monserrate in Viana do Castelo, and opposed Porto and Sporting CP. Porto defeated Sporting CP 2–1 to claim their second Campeonato de Portugal.

== Match ==
=== Details ===
28 June 1925

Porto	2 – 1	Sporting CP
Hall 20' da Costa 53' (pen.)		Gonçalves 50'

Campo de Monserrate, Viana do Castelo
Referee: Rafael Núñez (Spain)

Porto	Sporting CP

GK	(Hungary) Miguel Siska
DF	(Portugal) Pedro Temudo
DF	(Portugal) Júlio Cardoso
MF	(Portugal) Velez Carneiro
MF	(Portugal) Floreano Pereira
MF	(Portugal) Artur Freire
MF	(Portugal) Humberto Bragança
FW	(Portugal) Coelho da Costa
FW	(England) Norman Hall (c)
FW	(Portugal) Flávio Laranjeira
FW	(Portugal) João Nunes
Substitutes:
Manager:
(Hungary) Akos Teszler

GK	(Portugal) Cipriano Santos
DF	(Portugal) Jorge Vieira (c)
DF	(Portugal) Martinho Oliveira
DF	(Portugal) Joaquim Ferreira
DF	(Portugal) José Leandro
MF	(Portugal) Henrique Portela
MF	(Portugal) Filipe dos Santos
FW	(Portugal) Emílio Ramos
FW	(Portugal) Jaime Gonçalves
FW	(Portugal) João Francisco
FW	(Portugal) Alfredo Torres Pereira
Substitutes:
Manager:
(Hungary) Julius Lelovtic

1924–25 Campeonato de Portugal Winners
Porto
2nd Title

Match officials

- Assistant referees:
- Fourth official:

Match rules

- 90 minutes.

== See also ==
- FC Porto–Sporting CP rivalry
