= 1923 Campeonato de Portugal final =

1923 Campeonato de Portugal Final
- Event: 1922–23 Campeonato de Portugal
Sporting CP	Académica
3	0
- Date: 24 June 1923
- Venue: Santo Stadium, Faro
- Referee: Eduardo Vieira
- Attendance: 4,000

The 1923 Campeonato de Portugal Final was the final match of the 1922–23 Campeonato de Portugal, the 2nd season of the Portuguese football cup, organised by the Portuguese Football Union.

The match took place on Sunday, 24 June 1923, at the Santo Stadium in Faro, between Lisbon side Sporting CP and Coimbra side Académica. Sporting won the match 3–0, with goals from Francisco Stromp and from two penalties by Joaquim Ferreira. In doing so, Sporting CP conquered their 1st title in the competition.

== Road to the final ==
Note: In all results below, the score of the finalist is given first (all games were played at a neutral venue).

Sporting CP		Round	Académica	
Opponent	Result	Round	Opponent	Result
–		First round	Braga	2–1
–		Second round	Lusitano VRSA	3–2
FC Porto	3–0	Semi-finals	Marítimo	2–1

== Match ==
=== Summary ===
Despite some opposition from Académica, because of the proximity of the academic exams, and even though Sporting CP expressed the desire to play the final at Coimbra (where they won their semi-final match against FC Porto), the match was played at Santo Stadium, the new ground of Farense. It was also a sportsman from Farense, Eduardo Vieira, who was assigned as referee.

Only 12 minutes had passed since the beginning of the game when Francisco Stromp put the ball into the net from Carlos Fernandes's cross. In the 18th minute, a penalty was awarded to Sporting CP for an handball on the sequence of a corner kick, which Joaquim Ferreira converted successfully. Still in the first half, Francisco Stromp was injured and left the ground.

Sporting CP lined up with 10 men for the second half but scored the final goal from another penalty in the 53rd minute, again converted by Joaquim Ferreira. Some time later, Francisco Stromp was able to return to the game, which finished 3–0 for Sporting CP.

=== Details ===
24 June 1923
18:00

Sporting CP	3–0	Académica
Francisco Stromp 12'; Joaquim Ferreira 18' (pen.), 53' (pen.)

Santo Stadium, Faro
Attendance: 4,000
Referee: Eduardo Vieira

Sporting CP	Académica

GK	(Portugal) Cipriano Santos
DF	(Portugal) Jorge Vieira
DF	(Portugal) José Leandro
DF	(Portugal) Joaquim Ferreira
MF	(Portugal) Filipe dos Santos
MF	(Portugal) Henrique Portela
FW	(Portugal) Francisco Stromp (c)
FW	(Portugal) Alfredo Torres Pereira
FW	(Portugal) Jaime Gonçalves
FW	(Portugal) João Francisco Maia
FW	(Portugal) Carlos Fernandes
Manager:
(Germany) Augusto Sabbo

GK	(Brazil) João Ferreira
DF	(Portugal) Ribeiro da Costa
DF	(Portugal) Francisco Prudêncio
MF	(Portugal) Teófilo Esquível (c)
MF	(Portugal) Joaquim Miguel
MF	(Portugal) António Galante
FW	(Portugal) Gil Vicente
FW	(Portugal) José Neto
FW	(Portugal) Armando Batalha
FW	(Portugal) Guedes Pinto
FW	(Portugal) Augusto Pais
Manager:
(Portugal) Teófilo Esquível

Match rules

- 90 minutes.
- 30 minutes of extra time if necessary.
- Penalty shoot-out if scores still level.
