= List of Portuguese football champions =

Portuguese League (1st tier)

Campeonato de Portugal (1922–1938)

Campeonato da Liga (1934–1938) Primeira Divisão (1938–1999) Primeira Liga (1999–present)
- Country
- Portugal
- Founded
- 1934
- Number of teams
- 18 (since 2014–15 season)
- Current champions
- Porto (2025–26)
- Most successful club
- Benfica (38 titles)

The Portuguese football champions are the winners of the highest league in Portuguese men's football, the Primeira Liga.

== History ==
Before the creation of the Primeira Liga, there was a competition called Championship of Portugal (Campeonato de Portugal), created in 1922 as the first competition of Portuguese football, however, despite its name and being at the time crowned Portuguese Champions, they are not recognized as Champions any longer. The knock-out format of this Competition corresponds to today's Portuguese Cup (Taça de Portugal).

In 1934, Campeonato da Liga da Primeira Divisão was created as the top-tier football in Portugal. The winners of Campeonato da Liga are considered Portuguese champions.

From the 1938–39 season on, Campeonato de Portugal was named Taça de Portugal, and Campeonato da Liga was named National Championship of the First Division, usually called First Division (Primeira Divisão). Since 1999, Primeira Divisão has been known as Primeira Liga.

FC Porto were the first club to be crowned League champions, in the 1934–35 season.

S.L. Benfica, with 38 titles, have been crowned champions more times than any other club and dominated the league during the 1960s and 1970s. Benfica are followed by Porto with 31 titles, who dominated in the 1990s and 2000s, who in turn are followed by Sporting CP, with 20 titles, who dominated in the 1940s and 1950s. C.F. Os Belenenses and Boavista F.C. are the only two other clubs that have managed to win the league once. All five clubs are from the two largest Portuguese cities, of Lisbon and Porto respectively.

== Campeonato de Portugal (1922–1938) ==
Campeonato de Portugal finals
| Season | Winners | Result | Runners-up | Date | Venue |
|---|---|---|---|---|---|
| 1922 | Porto | 2–1 | Sporting CP | 4 June 1922 | Campo da Constituição, Porto |
| 1922 | Porto | 0–2 | Sporting CP | 11 June 1922 | Campo Grande, Lisbon |
| 1922 | Porto | 3–1 (a.e.t.) | Sporting CP | 18 June 1922 | Campo do Bessa, Porto |
| 1922–23 | Sporting CP | 3–0 | Académica | 24 June 1923 | Santo Estádio, Faro |
| 1923–24 | Olhanense | 4–2 | Porto | 8 June 1924 | Campo Grande, Lisbon |
| 1924–25 | Porto (2) | 2–1 | Sporting CP | 28 June 1925 | Campo de Monserrate, Viana do Castelo |
| 1925–26 | Marítimo | 2–0 (Note: Belenenses walked off on the 50th minute to protest the officiating.) | Belenenses | 6 June 1926 | Campo do Ameal, Porto |
| 1926–27 | Belenenses | 3–0 | Vitória de Setúbal | 12 June 1927 | Estádio do Lumiar, Lisbon |
| 1927–28 | Carcavelinhos | 3–1 | Sporting CP | 30 June 1928 | Campo de Palhavã, Lisbon |
| 1928–29 | Belenenses (2) | 3–1 | União de Lisboa | 16 June 1929 | Campo de Palhavã, Lisbon |
| 1929–30 | Benfica | 3–1 (a.e.t.) | Barreirense | 1 June 1930 | Campo Grande, Lisbon |
| 1930–31 | Benfica (2) | 3–0 | Porto | 28 June 1931 | Campo do Arnado, Coimbra |
| 1931–32 | Porto (3) | 4–4 (a.e.t.) | Belenenses | 30 June 1932 | Campo do Arnado, Coimbra |
| 1931–32 | Porto (3) | 2–1 | Belenenses | 17 July 1932 | Campo do Arnado, Coimbra |
| 1932–33 | Belenenses (3) | 3–1 | Sporting CP | 2 July 1933 | Estádio do Lumiar, Lisbon |
| 1933–34 | Sporting CP (2) | 4–3 (a.e.t.) | Barreirense | 8 July 1934 | Estádio do Lumiar, Lisbon |
| 1934–35 | Benfica (3) | 2–1 | Sporting CP | 30 June 1935 | Estádio do Lumiar, Lisbon |
| 1935–36 | Sporting CP (3) | 3–1 | Belenenses | 7 July 1936 | Estádio do Lumiar, Lisbon |
| 1936–37 | Porto (4) | 3–2 | Sporting CP | 4 July 1937 | Campo do Arnado, Coimbra |
| 1937–38 | Sporting CP (4) | 3–1 | Benfica | 26 June 1938 | Estádio do Lumiar, Lisbon |

Titles won by club (%)
1. Sporting CP – 4 (23.6%)
2. FC Porto – 4 (23.6%)
3. CF Os Belenenses – 3 (17.6%)
4. SL Benfica – 3 (17.6%)
5. Carcavelinhos FC (atual Atlético CP) - 1 (5.90%)
6. SC Olhanense - 1 (5.90%)
7. CS Marítimo - 1 (5.90%)

Despite being titled National Champions at the time of the Competition—between 1922 and 1938—the Federação Portuguesa de Futebol considered these titles should not enter into account for the final sum.

== List of champions and top scorers ==
| Clubs | | | | | | | | | Players | | |
| Season | Champions | Points | Runners-up | Points | Third place | Points | Teams | Rounds | Bota de Prata (Top Scorer) | Club | Goals |
Campeonato da Liga
| 1934–35 | Porto | 22 | Sporting CP | 20 | Benfica | 19 | 8 | 14 | Manuel Soeiro | Sporting CP | 14 |
| 1935–36 | Benfica | 21 | Porto | 20 | Sporting CP | 16 | 8 | 14 | Pinga | Porto | 21 |
| 1936–37 | Benfica (2) | 24 | Belenenses | 23 | Sporting CP | 19 | 8 | 14 | Manuel Soeiro | Sporting CP | 24 |
| 1937–38 | Benfica (3) | 23 | Porto | 23 | Sporting CP | 23 | 8 | 14 | Fernando Peyroteo | Sporting CP | 34 |
Campeonato Nacional da Primeira Divisão
| 1938–39 | Porto (2) | 23 | Sporting CP | 22 | Benfica | 21 | 8 | 14 | Costuras | Porto | 18 |
| 1939–40 | Porto (3) | 34 | Sporting CP | 32 | Belenenses | 25 | 10 | 18 | Fernando Peyroteo; Slavko Kodrnja | Sporting CP; Porto | 29 |
| 1940–41 | Sporting CP | 23 | Porto | 20 | Belenenses | 19 | 8 | 14 | Fernando Peyroteo | Sporting CP | 29 |
| 1941–42 | Benfica (4) | 38 | Sporting CP | 34 | Belenenses | 30 | 12 | 22 | Correia Dias | Porto | 36 |
| 1942–43 | Benfica (5) | 30 | Sporting CP | 29 | Belenenses | 28 | 10 | 18 | Julinho | Benfica | 24 |
| 1943–44 | Sporting CP (2) | 31 | Benfica | 26 | Atlético CP | 24 | 10 | 18 | Francisco Rodrigues | Vitória de Setúbal | 28 |
| 1944–45 | Benfica (6) | 30 | Belenenses | 27 | Sporting CP | 27 | 10 | 18 | Francisco Rodrigues | Vitória de Setúbal | 21 |
| 1945–46 | Belenenses | 38 | Benfica | 37 | Sporting CP | 32 | 12 | 22 | Fernando Peyroteo | Sporting CP | 37 |
| 1946–47 | Sporting CP (3) | 47 | Benfica | 41 | Porto | 33 | 14 | 26 | Fernando Peyroteo | Sporting CP | 43 |
| 1947–48 | Sporting CP (4) | 41 | Benfica | 41 | Belenenses | 37 | 14 | 26 | António Araújo | Porto | 36 |
| 1948–49 | Sporting CP (5) | 42 | Benfica | 37 | Belenenses | 35 | 14 | 26 | Fernando Peyroteo | Sporting CP | 40 |
| 1949–50 | Benfica (7) | 45 | Sporting CP | 39 | Atlético CP | 30 | 14 | 26 | Julinho | Benfica | 28 |
| 1950–51 | Sporting CP (6) | 45 | Porto | 34 | Benfica | 30 | 14 | 26 | Manuel Vasques | Sporting CP | 29 |
| 1951–52 | Sporting CP (7) | 41 | Benfica | 40 | Porto | 36 | 14 | 26 | José Águas | Benfica | 28 |
| 1952–53 | Sporting CP (8) | 43 | Benfica | 39 | Belenenses | 36 | 14 | 26 | Matateu | Belenenses | 29 |
| 1953–54 | Sporting CP (9) | 43 | Porto | 36 | Benfica | 32 | 14 | 26 | João Martins | Sporting CP | 31 |
| 1954–55 | Benfica (8) | 39 | Belenenses | 39 | Sporting CP | 37 | 14 | 26 | Matateu | Belenenses | 32 |
| 1955–56 | Porto (4) | 43 | Benfica | 43 | Belenenses | 37 | 14 | 26 | José Águas | Benfica | 28 |
| 1956–57 | Benfica (9) | 41 | Porto | 40 | Belenenses | 33 | 14 | 26 | José Águas | Benfica | 30 |
| 1957–58 | Sporting CP (10) | 43 | Porto | 43 | Benfica | 36 | 14 | 26 | Arsénio Duarte | CUF | 23 |
| 1958–59 | Porto (5) | 41 | Benfica | 41 | Belenenses | 38 | 14 | 26 | José Águas | Benfica | 26 |
| 1959–60 | Benfica (10) | 45 | Sporting CP | 43 | Belenenses | 36 | 14 | 26 | Edmur Ribeiro | Vitória de Guimarães | 25 |
| 1960–61 | Benfica (11) | 46 | Sporting CP | 42 | Porto | 33 | 14 | 26 | José Águas | Benfica | 27 |
| 1961–62 | Sporting CP (11) | 43 | Porto | 41 | Benfica | 36 | 14 | 26 | Veríssimo | Porto | 23 |
| 1962–63 | Benfica (12) | 48 | Porto | 42 | Sporting CP | 38 | 14 | 26 | José Augusto Torres | Benfica | 26 |
| 1963–64 | Benfica (13) | 46 | Porto | 40 | Sporting CP | 34 | 14 | 26 | Eusébio | Benfica | 28 |
| 1964–65 | Benfica (14) | 43 | Porto | 37 | CUF Barreiro | 35 | 14 | 26 | Eusébio | Benfica | 28 |
| 1965–66 | Sporting CP (12) | 42 | Benfica | 41 | Porto | 34 | 14 | 26 | Eusébio; Ernesto Figueiredo | Benfica; Sporting CP | 25 |
| 1966–67 | Benfica (15) | 43 | Académica de Coimbra | 40 | Porto | 39 | 14 | 26 | Eusébio | Benfica | 31 |
| 1967–68 | Benfica (16) | 41 | Sporting CP | 37 | Porto | 36 | 14 | 26 | Eusébio | Benfica | 43 |
| 1968–69 | Benfica (17) | 39 | Porto | 37 | Vitória de Guimarães | 36 | 14 | 26 | Manuel António | Académica Coimbra | 19 |
| 1969–70 | Sporting CP (13) | 46 | Benfica | 38 | Vitória de Setúbal | 36 | 14 | 26 | Eusébio | Benfica | 20 |
| 1970–71 | Benfica (18) | 41 | Sporting CP | 38 | Porto | 37 | 14 | 26 | Artur Jorge | Benfica | 23 |
| 1971–72 | Benfica (19) | 55 | Vitória de Setúbal | 45 | Sporting CP | 43 | 16 | 30 | Artur Jorge | Benfica | 27 |
| 1972–73 | Benfica (20) | 58 | Belenenses | 40 | Vitória de Setúbal | 38 | 16 | 30 | Eusébio | Benfica | 40 |
| 1973–74 | Sporting CP (14) | 49 | Benfica | 47 | Vitória de Setúbal | 45 | 16 | 30 | Héctor Yazalde | Sporting CP | 46 |
| 1974–75 | Benfica (21) | 49 | Porto | 44 | Sporting CP | 43 | 16 | 30 | Héctor Yazalde | Sporting CP | 30 |
| 1975–76 | Benfica (22) | 50 | Boavista | 48 | Belenenses | 40 | 16 | 30 | Rui Jordão | Benfica | 30 |
| 1976–77 | Benfica (23) | 51 | Sporting CP | 42 | Porto | 41 | 16 | 30 | Fernando Gomes | Porto | 26 |
| 1977–78 | Porto (6) | 51 | Benfica | 51 | Sporting CP | 42 | 16 | 30 | Fernando Gomes | Porto | 25 |
| 1978–79 | Porto (7) | 50 | Benfica | 49 | Sporting CP | 42 | 16 | 30 | Fernando Gomes | Porto | 27 |
| 1979–80 | Sporting CP (15) | 52 | Porto | 50 | Benfica | 45 | 16 | 30 | Rui Jordão | Sporting CP | 31 |
| 1980–81 | Benfica (24) | 50 | Porto | 48 | Sporting CP | 37 | 16 | 30 | Nené | Benfica | 20 |
| 1981–82 | Sporting CP (16) | 46 | Benfica | 44 | Porto | 43 | 16 | 30 | Jacques Pereira | Porto | 27 |
| 1982–83 | Benfica (25) | 51 | Porto | 47 | Sporting CP | 42 | 16 | 30 | Fernando Gomes | Porto | 36 |
| 1983–84 | Benfica (26) | 52 | Porto | 49 | Sporting CP | 42 | 16 | 30 | Fernando Gomes; Nené | Porto; Benfica | 21 |
| 1984–85 | Porto (8) | 55 | Sporting CP | 47 | Benfica | 43 | 16 | 30 | Fernando Gomes | Porto | 39 |
| 1985–86 | Porto (9) | 49 | Benfica | 47 | Sporting CP | 46 | 16 | 30 | Manuel Fernandes | Sporting CP | 30 |
| 1986–87 | Benfica (27) | 48 | Porto | 46 | Vitória de Guimarães | 41 | 16 | 30 | Paulinho Cascavel | Vitória de Guimarães | 22 |
| 1987–88 | Porto (10) | 66 | Benfica | 51 | Belenenses | 48 | 20 | 38 | Paulinho Cascavel | Sporting CP | 23 |
| 1988–89 | Benfica (28) | 63 | Porto | 56 | Boavista | 49 | 20 | 38 | Vata | Benfica | 16 |
| 1989–90 | Porto (11) | 59 | Benfica | 55 | Sporting CP | 46 | 18 | 34 | Mats Magnusson | Benfica | 33 |
| 1990–91 | Benfica (29) | 69 | Porto | 67 | Sporting CP | 57 | 20 | 38 | Rui Águas | Benfica | 25 |
| 1991–92 | Porto (12) | 56 | Benfica | 46 | Boavista | 44 | 18 | 34 | Ricky | Boavista | 30 |
| 1992–93 | Porto (13) | 54 | Benfica | 52 | Sporting CP | 45 | 18 | 34 | Jorge Cadete | Sporting CP | 18 |
| 1993–94 | Benfica (30) | 54 | Porto | 52 | Sporting CP | 51 | 18 | 34 | Rashidi Yekini | Vitória de Setúbal | 21 |
| 1994–95 | Porto (14) | 62 | Sporting CP | 53 | Benfica | 49 | 18 | 34 | Hassan Nader | Farense | 21 |
| 1995–96^{(1)} | Porto (15) | 84 | Benfica | 73 | Sporting CP | 67 | 18 | 34 | Domingos Paciência | Porto | 25 |
| 1996–97 | Porto (16) | 85 | Sporting CP | 72 | Benfica | 58 | 18 | 34 | Mário Jardel | Porto | 30 |
| 1997–98 | Porto (17) | 77 | Benfica | 68 | Vitória de Guimarães | 59 | 18 | 34 | Mário Jardel | Porto | 26 |
| 1998–99 | Porto (18) | 79 | Boavista | 71 | Benfica | 65 | 18 | 34 | Mário Jardel | Porto | 36 |
Primeira Liga
| 1999–2000 | Sporting CP (17) | 77 | Porto | 73 | Benfica | 69 | 18 | 34 | Mário Jardel | Porto | 37 |
| 2000–01 | Boavista | 77 | Porto | 76 | Sporting CP | 62 | 18 | 34 | Pena | Porto | 22 |
| 2001–02 | Sporting CP (18) | 75 | Boavista | 70 | Porto | 68 | 18 | 34 | Mário Jardel | Sporting CP | 42 |
| 2002–03 | Porto (19) | 86 | Benfica | 75 | Sporting CP | 59 | 18 | 34 | Fary Faye | Beira-Mar | 18 |
| 2003–04 | Porto (20) | 82 | Benfica | 74 | Sporting CP | 73 | 18 | 34 | Benni McCarthy | Porto | 20 |
| 2004–05 | Benfica (31) | 65 | Porto | 62 | Sporting CP | 61 | 18 | 34 | Liédson | Sporting CP | 25 |
| 2005–06 | Porto (21) | 79 | Sporting CP | 72 | Benfica | 67 | 18 | 34 | Albert Meyong | Belenenses | 17 |
| 2006–07 | Porto (22) | 69 | Sporting CP | 68 | Benfica | 67 | 16 | 30 | Liédson | Sporting CP | 15 |
| 2007–08 | Porto (23) | 69^{(2)} | Sporting CP | 55 | Vitória de Guimarães | 53 | 16 | 30 | Lisandro López | Porto | 24 |
| 2008–09 | Porto (24) | 70 | Sporting CP | 66 | Benfica | 59 | 16 | 30 | Nenê | Nacional | 20 |
| 2009–10 | Benfica (32) | 76 | Braga | 71 | Porto | 68 | 16 | 30 | Óscar Cardozo | Benfica | 26 |
| 2010–11 | Porto (25) | 84 | Benfica | 63 | Sporting CP | 48 | 16 | 30 | Hulk | Porto | 23 |
| 2011–12 | Porto (26) | 75 | Benfica | 69 | Braga | 62 | 16 | 30 | Óscar Cardozo | Benfica | 20 |
| 2012–13 | Porto (27) | 78 | Benfica | 77 | Paços de Ferreira | 54 | 16 | 30 | Jackson Martínez | Porto | 26 |
| 2013–14 | Benfica (33) | 74 | Sporting CP | 67 | Porto | 61 | 16 | 30 | Jackson Martínez | Porto | 20 |
| 2014–15 | Benfica (34) | 85 | Porto | 82 | Sporting CP | 76 | 18 | 34 | Jackson Martínez | Porto | 21 |
| 2015–16 | Benfica (35) | 88 | Sporting CP | 86 | Porto | 73 | 18 | 34 | Jonas | Benfica | 31 |
| 2016–17 | Benfica (36) | 82 | Porto | 76 | Sporting CP | 70 | 18 | 34 | Bas Dost | Sporting CP | 34 |
| 2017–18 | Porto (28) | 88 | Benfica | 81 | Sporting CP | 78 | 18 | 34 | Jonas | Benfica | 34 |
| 2018–19 | Benfica (37) | 87 | Porto | 85 | Sporting CP | 74 | 18 | 34 | Haris Seferovic | Benfica | 23 |
| 2019–20 | Porto (29) | 82 | Benfica | 77 | Braga | 60 | 18 | 34 | Carlos Vinícius | Benfica | 19 |
| 2020–21 | Sporting CP (19) | 85 | Porto | 80 | Benfica | 76 | 18 | 34 | Pedro Gonçalves | Sporting CP | 23 |
| 2021–22 | Porto (30) | 91 | Sporting CP | 85 | Benfica | 74 | 18 | 34 | Darwin Nuñez | Benfica | 26 |
| 2022–23 | Benfica (38) | 87 | Porto | 85 | Braga | 78 | 18 | 34 | Mehdi Taremi | Porto | 22 |
| 2023–24 | Sporting CP (20) | 90 | Benfica | 80 | Porto | 72 | 18 | 34 | Viktor Gyökeres | Sporting CP | 29 |
| 2024–25 | Sporting CP (21) | 82 | Benfica | 80 | Porto | 71 | 18 | 34 | Viktor Gyökeres | Sporting CP | 39 |
| 2025–26 | Porto (31) | 88 | Sporting CP | 82 | Benfica | 80 | 18 | 34 | Luis Suárez | Sporting CP | 28 |

- (1) 3 points were awarded for a win from the 1995–96 season onwards. Prior to this 2 points were awarded for a win.
- (2) Porto saw six points subtracted in the Apito Dourado corruption scandal because of bribery allegations, which reduced their 20-point lead (total 75 points) to 14. But in May 2011 the Central Administrative Court of the South of Portugal ruled that decision, taken in 2008 in a meeting made by the Justice Council of the Portuguese Football Federation, as being "inexistent". The Portuguese Football Federation has announced it would appeal from this decision the Administrative Supreme Court.

=== Performance by club ===
All Primeira Liga champions have come from either Lisbon or Porto.

| Club | Winners | Runners-up | Winning years | Runners-up years |
|---|---|---|---|---|
| Benfica | 38 | 31 | 1936, 1937, 1938, 1942, 1943, 1945, 1950, 1955, 1957, 1960, 1961, 1963, 1964, 1965, 1967, 1968, 1969, 1971, 1972, 1973, 1975, 1976, 1977, 1981, 1983, 1984, 1987, 1989, 1991, 1994, 2005, 2010, 2014, 2015, 2016, 2017, 2019, 2023 | 1944, 1946, 1947, 1948, 1949, 1952, 1953, 1956, 1959, 1966, 1970, 1974, 1978, 1979, 1982, 1986, 1988, 1990, 1992, 1993, 1996, 1998, 2003, 2004, 2011, 2012, 2013, 2018, 2020, 2024, 2025 |
| Porto | 31 | 29 | 1935, 1939, 1940, 1956, 1959, 1978, 1979, 1985, 1986, 1988, 1990, 1992, 1993, 1995, 1996, 1997, 1998, 1999, 2003, 2004, 2006, 2007, 2008, 2009, 2011, 2012, 2013, 2018, 2020, 2022, 2026 | 1936, 1938, 1941, 1951, 1954, 1957, 1958, 1962, 1963, 1964, 1965, 1969, 1975, 1980, 1981, 1983, 1984, 1987, 1989, 1991, 1994, 2000, 2001, 2005, 2015, 2017, 2019, 2021, 2023 |
| Sporting CP | 21 | 22 | 1941, 1944, 1947, 1948, 1949, 1951, 1952, 1953, 1954, 1958, 1962, 1966, 1970, 1974, 1980, 1982, 2000, 2002, 2021, 2024, 2025 | 1935, 1939, 1940, 1942, 1943, 1950, 1960, 1961, 1968, 1971, 1977, 1985, 1995, 1997, 2006, 2007, 2008, 2009, 2014, 2016, 2022, 2026 |
| Belenenses | 1 | 4 | 1946 | 1937, 1945, 1955, 1973 |
| Boavista | 1 | 3 | 2001 | 1976, 1999, 2002 |
| Académica de Coimbra | – | 1 | - | 1967 |
| Vitória de Setúbal | – | 1 | - | 1972 |
| Braga | – | 1 | - | 2010 |

Titles won by club (%)
1. Benfica – 38 (41.3%)
2. Porto – 31 (33.7%)
3. Sporting CP – 21 (22.8%)
4. Belenenses – 1 (1.10%)
5. Boavista – 1 (1.10%)

== Performance by city ==
Five clubs have been champions, from a total of two cities.

| City | Number of titles | Clubs |
|---|---|---|
| Lisbon | 60 | Benfica (38), Sporting (21), Belenenses (1) |
| Porto | 32 | Porto (31), Boavista (1) |

== Doubles, Trebles, and Quadruples ==
The Double, called Dobradinha in Portuguese, means winning the Primeira Liga and the Taça de Portugal in the same season. The first double was achieved by Sporting CP in 1941 and most recently also by Sporting CP in the 2024–25 season.

The Treble, called Triplete in Portuguese, usually refers either winning the domestic treble of Primeira Liga, Taça de Portugal and Taça da Liga (domestic treble) or winning a UEFA competition, the Primeira Liga and Taça de Portugal (continental treble) in the same season. The Supertaça Cândido de Oliveira does not count. Benfica is the only Portuguese club to have achieved a domestic treble by winning the Primeira Liga, Taça de Portugal and Taça da Liga in 2014, and Porto is the only Portuguese club to have achieved a continental treble by winning the Primeira Liga, Taça de Portugal and UEFA Cup in 2003, and by winning the Primeira Liga, Taça de Portugal and UEFA Europa League in 2011.

The Quadruple, called Quadriplete in Portuguese, refers to winning 4 titles in the same season. This feat has only been achieved by Porto (furthermore twice) in the 1987–88 season, when it won the European Super Cup, Intercontinental Cup, Primeira Liga and Taça de Portugal, and in the 2010–11 season when it won the Supertaça Cândido de Oliveira, Primeira Liga, UEFA Europa League and Taça de Portugal.

Teams below have made the Double:

| Season | Winners | Trophies |
|---|---|---|
| 1940–41 | Sporting CP | Primeira Divisão, Taça de Portugal |
| 1942–43 | Benfica | Primeira Divisão, Taça de Portugal |
| 1947–48 | Sporting CP (2) | Primeira Divisão, Taça de Portugal |
| 1953–54 | Sporting CP (3) | Primeira Divisão, Taça de Portugal |
| 1954–55 | Benfica (2) | Primeira Divisão, Taça de Portugal |
| 1955–56 | Porto | Primeira Divisão, Taça de Portugal |
| 1956–57 | Benfica (3) | Primeira Divisão, Taça de Portugal |
| 1963–64 | Benfica (4) | Primeira Divisão, Taça de Portugal |
| 1968–69 | Benfica (5) | Primeira Divisão, Taça de Portugal |
| 1971–72 | Benfica (6) | Primeira Divisão, Taça de Portugal |
| 1973–74 | Sporting CP (4) | Primeira Divisão, Taça de Portugal |
| 1980–81 | Benfica (7) | Primeira Divisão, Taça de Portugal |
| 1981–82 | Sporting CP (5) | Primeira Divisão, Taça de Portugal |
| 1982–83 | Benfica (8) | Primeira Divisão, Taça de Portugal |
| 1986–87 | Benfica (9) | Primeira Divisão, Taça de Portugal |
| 1987–88 | Porto (2) | Primeira Divisão, Taça de Portugal |
| 1997–98 | Porto (3) | Primeira Divisão, Taça de Portugal |
| 2001–02 | Sporting CP (6) | Primeira Liga, Taça de Portugal |
| 2002–03 | Porto (4) | Primeira Liga, Taça de Portugal |
| 2005–06 | Porto (5) | Primeira Liga, Taça de Portugal |
| 2008–09 | Porto (6) | Primeira Liga, Taça de Portugal |
| 2010–11 | Porto (7) | Primeira Liga, Taça de Portugal |
| 2013–14 | Benfica (10) | Primeira Liga, Taça de Portugal |
| 2016–17 | Benfica (11) | Primeira Liga, Taça de Portugal |
| 2019–20 | Porto (8) | Primeira Liga, Taça de Portugal |
| 2021–22 | Porto (9) | Primeira Liga, Taça de Portugal |
| 2024–25 | Sporting CP (8) | Primeira Liga, Taça de Portugal |

Teams below have made the Treble:

| Season | Winners | Trophies |
|---|---|---|
| 2002–03 | Porto | Primeira Liga, Taça de Portugal, UEFA Cup |
| 2010–11 | Porto (2) | Primeira Liga, Taça de Portugal, UEFA Europa League |
| 2013–14 | Benfica | Primeira Liga, Taça de Portugal, Taça da Liga |

The below teams have made the Quadruple:

| Season | Winners | Trophies |
|---|---|---|
| 1987–88 | Porto | Intercontinental Cup, European Super Cup, Primeira Liga, Taça de Portugal |
| 2010–11 | Porto (2) | Supertaça Cândido de Oliveira, Primeira Liga, Taça de Portugal, UEFA Europa League |

== See also ==
- Portuguese football league system
- Football in Portugal
