= 1922–23 Campeonato de Portugal =

1922–1923 Campeonato de Portugal
Tournament details
- Country: Portugal
- Dates: 3–24 June 1923
- Teams: 6

Final positions
- Champions: Sporting CP (1st title)
- Runners-up: Académica

Tournament statistics
- Matches played: 5
- Goals scored: 17 (3.4 per match)
- Top goal scorer(s): Francisco Stromp, José Afonso (3 goals)

The 1922–23 Campeonato de Portugal was the second edition of Campeonato de Portugal. It was contested by 6 clubs, winners of regional championships, and took place from 3 to 24 June 1923.

FC Porto, the defending champions, were eliminated by Sporting CP in the semi-finals.

The winners were Sporting CP, who defeated Académica by 3–0 in the final.

== Format ==
The winners of six regional championships were qualified to this competition: Algarve FA's, Braga FA's, Coimbra FA's, Lisbon FA's, Madeira FA's and Porto FA's. This represents an increase in the number of clubs compared to the previous season, which had only the winners of Lisbon FA and Porto FA.

All matches are played on a single-leg, at a neutral venue, with extra time and penalties if necessary. Only Braga FA's and Coimbra FA's clubs play the first round; Algarve FA's club enter on the second round and Lisbon FA's, Madeira FA's and Porto FA's enter on the semi-finals.

	Teams entering in this round	Teams advancing from previous round
First round (2 teams)	2 champions from Braga FA and Coimbra FA	
Second round (2 teams)	1 champion from Algarve FA	1 winner from the first round
Semi-finals (4 teams)	3 winners from Lisbon FA, Madeira FA and Porto FA	1 winner from the second round
Final (2 teams)		2 winners from the semi-finals

== Teams ==
- Algarve FA winner: Lusitano VRSA
- Braga FA winner: Braga
- Coimbra FA winner: Académica
- Lisbon FA winner: Sporting CP
- Madeira FA winner: Marítimo
- Porto FA winner: FC Porto

== First round ==
3 June 1923	Académica	2–1	Braga	Porto
				Stadium: Campo do Bessa; Referee: António Figueiredo

== Second round ==
10 June 1923	Académica	3–2 (a.e.t.)	Lusitano VRSA	Lisbon
				Stadium: Estádio do Campo Grande; Referee: Vítor Gonçalves

== Semi-finals ==
17 June 1923	Sporting CP	3–0	FC Porto	Coimbra
16:30				Stadium: Campo dos Bentos; Attendance: 10,000; Referee: Robert Todd

17 June 1923	Académica	2–1	Marítimo	Lisbon
				Stadium: Campo da Palhavã; Referee: Albertino Torres

== Final ==
24 June 1923
18:00

Sporting CP	3–0	Académica
Francisco Stromp 12'; Joaquim Ferreira 18' (pen.), 53' (pen.)

Santo Stadium, Faro
Attendance: 4,000
Referee: Eduardo Vieira

== Bracket ==
First round
3 June 1923
Académica	2
Braga	1

Second round
10 June 1923
Académica	3
Lusitano VRSA	2

Semi-finals
17 June 1923
Sporting CP	3
FC Porto	0
17 June 1923
Académica	2
Marítimo	1

Final
24 June 1923
Sporting CP	3
Académica	0
