= Comercial =

Comercial—the Spanish and Portuguese word for "commercial"—can refer to:

- Esporte Clube Comercial (MS), a Brazilian football club from Campo Grande, Mato Grosso do Sul
- Esporte Clube Comercial (PR), Brazilian football club from Cornélio Procópio, Paraná.
- Comercial Futebol Clube (Ribeirão Preto), a Brazilian football club from Ribeirão Preto, São Paulo
- Comercial Futebol Clube (São Paulo), a Brazilian football club from São Paulo city.
- Comercial Futebol Clube (AL), a Brazilian football club from Viçosa, Alagoas
- Comercial Mexicana, a Mexican hypermarket group.
- Comercial Esporte Clube (SP), a Brazilian football club from the outskirts of São Paulo
- Comercial Esporte Clube (PE), a Brazilian football club from Serra Talhada, Pernambuco
- Rádio Comercial, a commercial radio station in Portugal

== See also ==
- Comercial Esporte Clube (disambiguation) (also covers "Esporte Clube Comercial")
- Comercial Futebol Clube (disambiguation)
