= Alberto Augusto =

Portuguese footballer

Personal information
- Full name: Alberto João Augusto
- Date of birth: 31 July 1898
- Place of birth: Lisbon, Portugal
- Date of death: 1973 (aged 75)
- Position: Forward

Senior career*
Years	Team	Apps	(Gls)
1917–1924	Benfica		
1919–1920	Leões Santarém		
1924–1925	America RJ		
1925–1926	Sporting Braga		
1927–1928	Salgueiros		
1932–1934	Sporting Braga		
1934–1935	Comercial		
1935–1937	Vitória Guimarães		

International career
1921–1926	Portugal	4	(1)

Managerial career
- 1927–1928: Salgueiros
- 1932–1934: Sporting Braga
- 1934–1935: Comercial
- 1935–1945: Vitória Guimarães
- * Club domestic league appearances and goals

Alberto João Augusto (born 31 July 1898 in Lisbon - died 1973) was a football player-coach who played as forward.

His brother, Artur Augusto, was also a Portugal international footballer.

Alberto Augusto was the first ever scorer for Portugal, scoring their only goal in a 3-1 loss to Spain.
