= Jorge Vieira =

Jorge Vieira may refer to:

- Jorge Vieira (footballer, born 1898) (1898–1936), Portuguese football defender
- Jorge Vieira (Brazilian footballer) (1934–2012), Brazilian footballer and head coach
- Jorge Vieira (footballer, born 1991), Portuguese football goalkeeper
