= Pedro Temudo =

Portuguese footballer

Personal information
- Date of birth: Unknown
- Place of birth: Portugal
- Date of death: Unknown
- Position: Defender

Senior career*
Years	Team	Apps	(Gls)
- FC Porto

International career
1929	Portugal	1	(0)
- * Club domestic league appearances and goals

Pedro Temudo was a Portuguese footballer who played as a defender.
