= Campo da Rainha =

Football stadium in Porto, Portugal

- Location: Porto, Portugal
- Capacity: 600

Construction
- Built: 1906
- Closed: 1912

Tenant
- FC Porto (1906–1912)

Campo da Rainha (English: Queen's Field) was a football stadium in Porto, Portugal, which served as the home ground of FC Porto. Built in 1906 to be the club's first stadium, it hosted matches until 1912, when the club moved to the larger Campo da Constituição.

== History ==
Having revived the club in August 1906, president José Monteiro da Costa immediately sought a place to build its sports facilities. Next to his house in Rua da Rainha (Queen's Street) – renamed Rua Antero de Quental following the 1910 Republican revolution – Monteiro da Costa rented a non-cultivated terrain from the Companhia Hortícola Portuense, the local horticultural society. On this terrain, the club erected a football pitch surrounded by a running track and stands with seats for 600 spectators, including a VIP tribune, a changing room equipped with showers and sinks, a bar and a gym. Named for the street where it was located, the Campo da Raínha was the first turf field in the country.

The ground was officially inaugurated with a match against Boavista Footballers, a local team and the predecessor of nowadays Boavista. In 1907, the club headquarters were moved from their first location in Rua Santa Teresa to the Campo da Raínha facilities. In this same year, a tennis court was added to the complex.

In 1911, Porto was warned by the city council that it had to abandon the Campo da Raínha, because a factory was planned to be constructed on that site. A year later, the club moved to a new field in Rua da Constituição (Constitution Street), appropriately named Campo da Constituição.

== Matches ==
Date	Opponent	Score	Notes
15 December 1907	(Spain) Real Fortuna	4–1	First match against a foreign team.
2 April 1911	(Portugal) Leixões	3–1	Victory in the inaugural José Monteiro da Costa Cup edition, which secured the team's first-ever trophy.
