= Balbino (footballer, born 1896) =

Portuguese footballer (born 1896)

Personal information
- Full name: José Balbino da Silva
- Date of birth: 23 March 1896
- Place of birth: Portugal
- Position: Forward

Senior career*
Years	Team	Apps	(Gls)
- FC Porto

International career
1923	Portugal	1	(0)
- * Club domestic league appearances and goals

José Balbino da Silva (born 23 March 1896, date of death unknown) was a Portuguese footballer who played as a forward.
