= Artur Augusto =

Portuguese footballer

Personal information
- Date of birth: 18 October 1896
- Place of birth: Portugal
- Date of death: unknown
- Position: Forward

Senior career*
| Years | Team | Apps | (Gls) |
| 1915–1921 | Benfica | | |
| 1921–1923 | Porto | | |
| 1924–1926 | Benfica | | |

International career
| 1921 | Portugal | 1 | (0) |
- * Club domestic league appearances and goals

Artur Augusto was a Portuguese footballer who played as a forward.

Artur Augusto played for the Portugal national football team in its inaugural match, a friendly against Spain in Madrid on 18 December 1921. He was the only player from the city of Porto included in the squad and became FC Porto's first international.

His brother, Alberto Augusto, was also a Portuguese international footballer.
