= Comercial Futebol Clube =

Comercial Futebol Clube may refer to:

- Comercial Futebol Clube (AL), a football club based in Viçosa, Alagoas, Brazil, founded in 1965
- Comercial Futebol Clube (São Paulo), a football club based in São Paulo, Brazil
- Comercial Futebol Clube (Ribeirão Preto), a football club based in Ribeirão Preto, São Paulo, Brazil, founded in 1911

== See also ==
- Comercial Esporte Clube (disambiguation)
