= Martinho Oliveira =

Portuguese footballer

Personal information
- Full name: Martinho Andrade de Oliveira
- Date of birth: Unknown
- Place of birth: Portugal
- Date of death: Deceased
- Position: Defender

Senior career*
Years	Team	Apps	(Gls)
1927–1931	Sporting CP		

International career
1928–1930	Portugal	6	(0)
- * Club domestic league appearances and goals

Martinho Andrade de Oliveira was a Portuguese footballer who played as defender.

== Football career ==
Oliveira gained 6 caps for Portugal. He made his debut 1 April 1928 in Lisbon in a 0–0 draw against Argentina.
