= Estádio de São Luís =

Football stadium in Faro, Portugal

Coordinates: 37°01′22.3″N 7°55′42.4″W

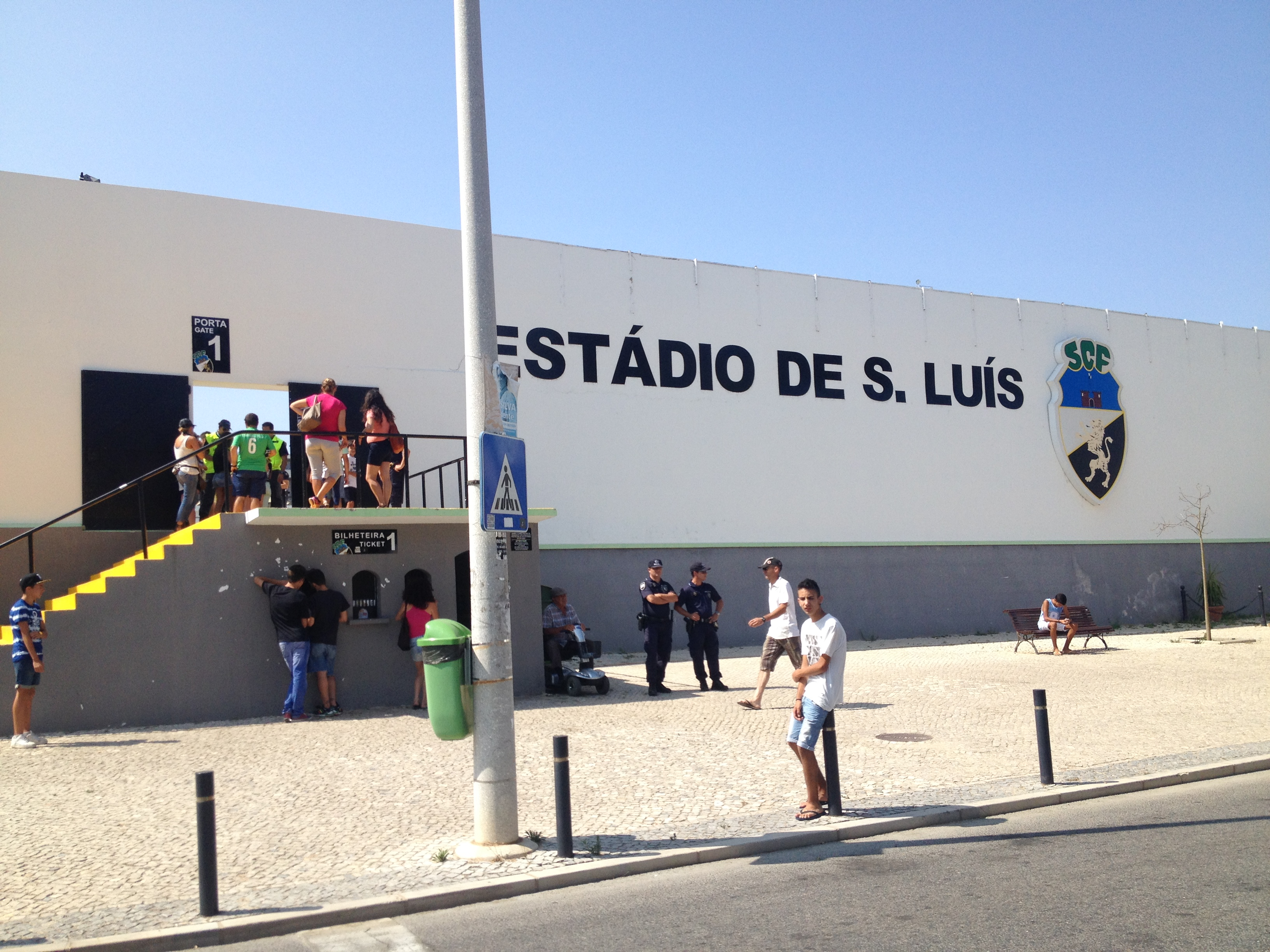
- Main entrance and ticket line in 2014
- Interactive map of Estádio de São Luís
- Full name: Estádio de São Luís
- Former names: Santo Stadium; Campo de São Luís
- Address: R. Sporting C. Farense, 8000-285 Faro
- Location: Faro, Algarve, Portugal
- Owner: SC Farense
- Operator: SC Farense
- Capacity: 7,000 spectators
- Type: Stadium
- Surface: Grass
- Scoreboard: Yes
- Record attendance: 14,000 spectators(28 April 2013); S.C. Farense 2–1 U.D. Leiria
- Field size: 100 × 64 m
- Public transit: Próximo Mini Bus Faro

Construction
- Groundbreaking: 1922
- Opened: 1 December 1923
- Renovated: 1971, 2013, 2020
- Expanded: 1960, 1990, 1999

Tenant
- SC Farense

The Estádio de São Luís, also known as Santo Stadium, is a multi-use stadium in Faro, Algarve, Portugal. It serves as the home stadium for Sporting Clube Farense, a football club based in Faro. The stadium was opened in 1923 and has a seating capacity of around 7,000 spectators.

It was continuously used by Farense from 1924, when it became the club's main tenant until 2004 when Farense relocated to the newly built Algarve Stadium. However, since 2013, Farense has returned to playing their home matches at the renovated São Luís Stadium.

Throughout its history, São Luís Stadium has been an important venue for Sporting Clube Farense, witnessing numerous moments for the club. It has also hosted lower division matches and local football events. São Luís Stadium holds a historic place in the city of Faro, contributing to the local football culture.

== Facility Uses ==
- Sporting Clube Farense Matches: The stadium has been the venue for numerous matches of Sporting Clube Farense, a well-known Portuguese football club. It has seen various important league matches and cup competitions involving the club.
- Lower Division Matches: São Luís Stadium has also hosted matches from lower divisions of Portuguese football, contributing to the development and promotion of local talent.
- Local Football Tournaments: The stadium has been used to host various local football tournaments and competitions, bringing together teams and players from the region.
- Cultural and Music Events: São Luís Stadium has occasionally been used for cultural and music events. It has hosted concerts and other entertainment shows, providing a versatile space for various forms of public gatherings.
- Benção das Pastas for Universidade do Algarve: Every year in May, the stadium becomes the venue for the graduation celebration of Algarve University students known as Benção das Pastas. During this event, graduating students come together to receive a heartfelt blessing, marking the beginning of their journey into the future. The expansive grounds of the stadium offer abundant space to accommodate the graduates and their families.

== History ==
=== Foundation ===
The São Luís Stadium in Faro was commissioned for construction in 1922 by Manuel Santo, a returning emigrant from the United States. Inspired by the great enthusiasm of the time and the lack of a suitable sports venue in the city, Santo acquired a plot of land near the Church of São Luís, measuring approximately 12,750 square meters, where he built the "Santo Stadium" (the stadium's initial name, named after its owner, Manuel Santo).

The plans at the time included all possible amenities for the public, including stands and VIP boxes, as well as provisions for various sports activities. The envisioned stadium was one of the first in Portugal to be built with specific characteristics for its intended purpose.

The Santo Stadium opened its doors to the public for the first time in May 1923. On 24 June of the same year, it hosted its first major event, the final of the 2nd season of the Portuguese football cup, in which Sporting CP defeated Académica de Coimbra 3–0. It was the first time, and one of the very few occasions, that the final was held outside the major circles of Lisbon and Porto.

According to news published on 21 September 1924, Sporting Clube Farense, in a General Assembly, decided to lease the field from the owner of the Santo Stadium, where the club's matches would be relocated.

In September 1924 Farense's matches started being played at this Stadium, which became the home of fervent Faro supporters. Six years later, it changed its name to Campo São Luís, reflecting the stadium's location.

In 1930 it was renamed Campo de São Luís, replacing the old designation.

On 25 November 1942 the stadium was acquired by Eusébio Tomás Lopes, and fifteen years later, on 14 December 1957, it was transferred to the municipal authority through a land exchange deed.

The Faro Municipal Council then changed the name to Estádio Municipal de São Luís solely due to its geographical location.

In 1960 new changing rooms were inaugurated, and on 24 May of the same year, the stadium's floodlights were used for the first time in a match between SC Farense and Ferroviário de Araraquara, where the Brazilian team won 0–5.

On 8 September 1971 the pitch was inaugurated.

In the following decades, the Santo Stadium would change ownership and name until 1 April 1986, when the then Municipal Stadium of São Luís was transferred to SC Farense on the club's 76th anniversary. This came after the stadium had already been the venue for the debut in the top tier of Portuguese football in the 1970/1971 season.

=== Golden years ===
The stadium, inaugurated in 1923, only received a proper football pitch when the Faro team ascended to the top division in the 1970s, but it was in the 1990s that it reached its peak.

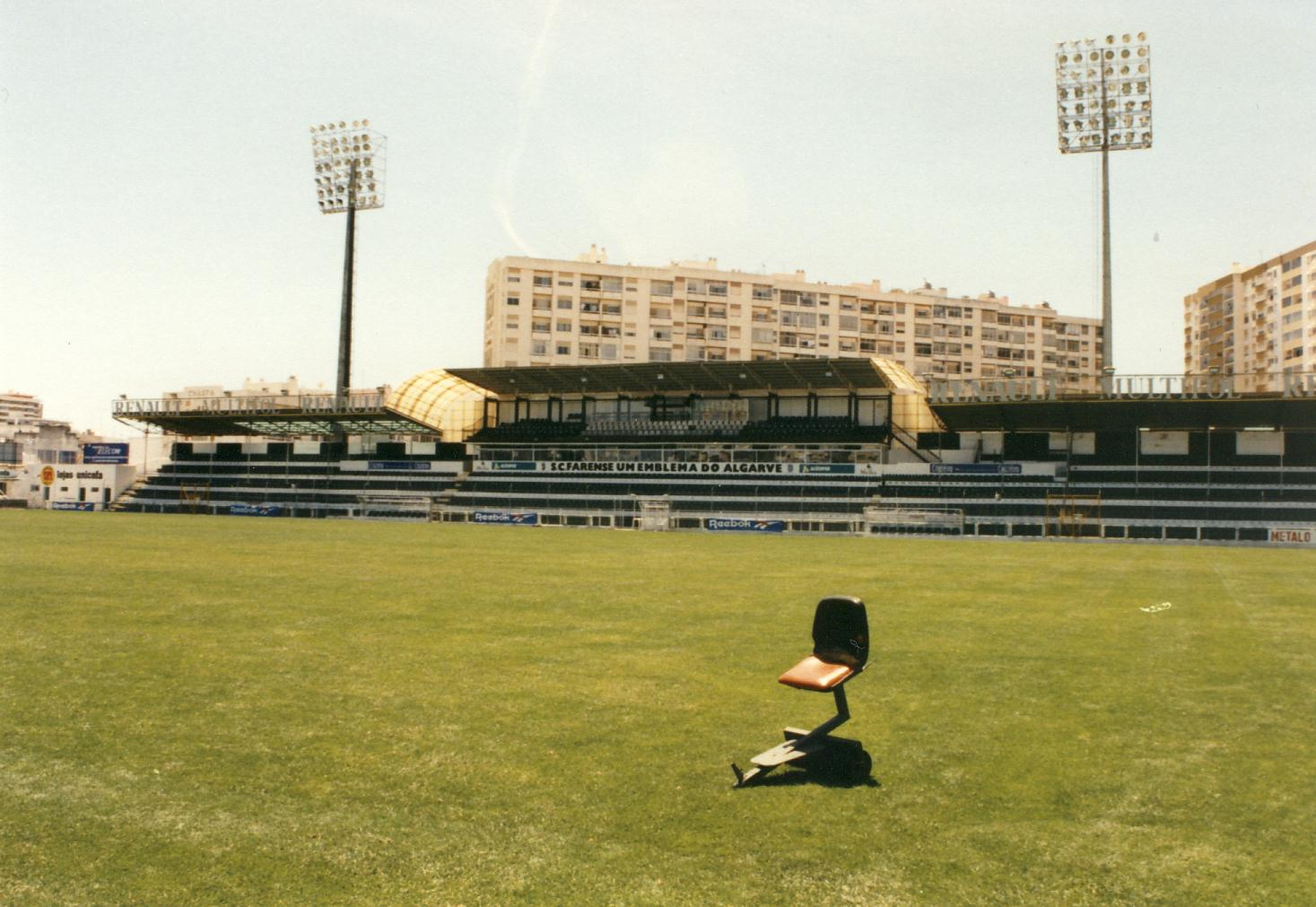
Stadium view in 1997

During its golden period in the 1990s, the São Luís Stadium gained a reputation among rival fans as the "Inferno" due to the intense atmosphere created by the stands near the field, particularly during matches against top teams. The team experienced glory during this time and even qualified for the UEFA Cup.

The Stadium also had two other names: Estádio Municipal de São Luís and, in 1986, on the day it was handed over by the Faro City Council to the club, Estádio de São Luís.

In 1990 the stadium underwent expansion and improvements in preparation for hosting the 1991 FIFA Under-20 World Cup held in Portugal.

In 1999, the old stand was demolished, and in its place, the new Stand, affectionately nicknamed the Pingo Doce Stand, was constructed. This name was given due to the presence of a Pingo Doce Supermarket located underneath the stand.

=== Financial Crisis ===
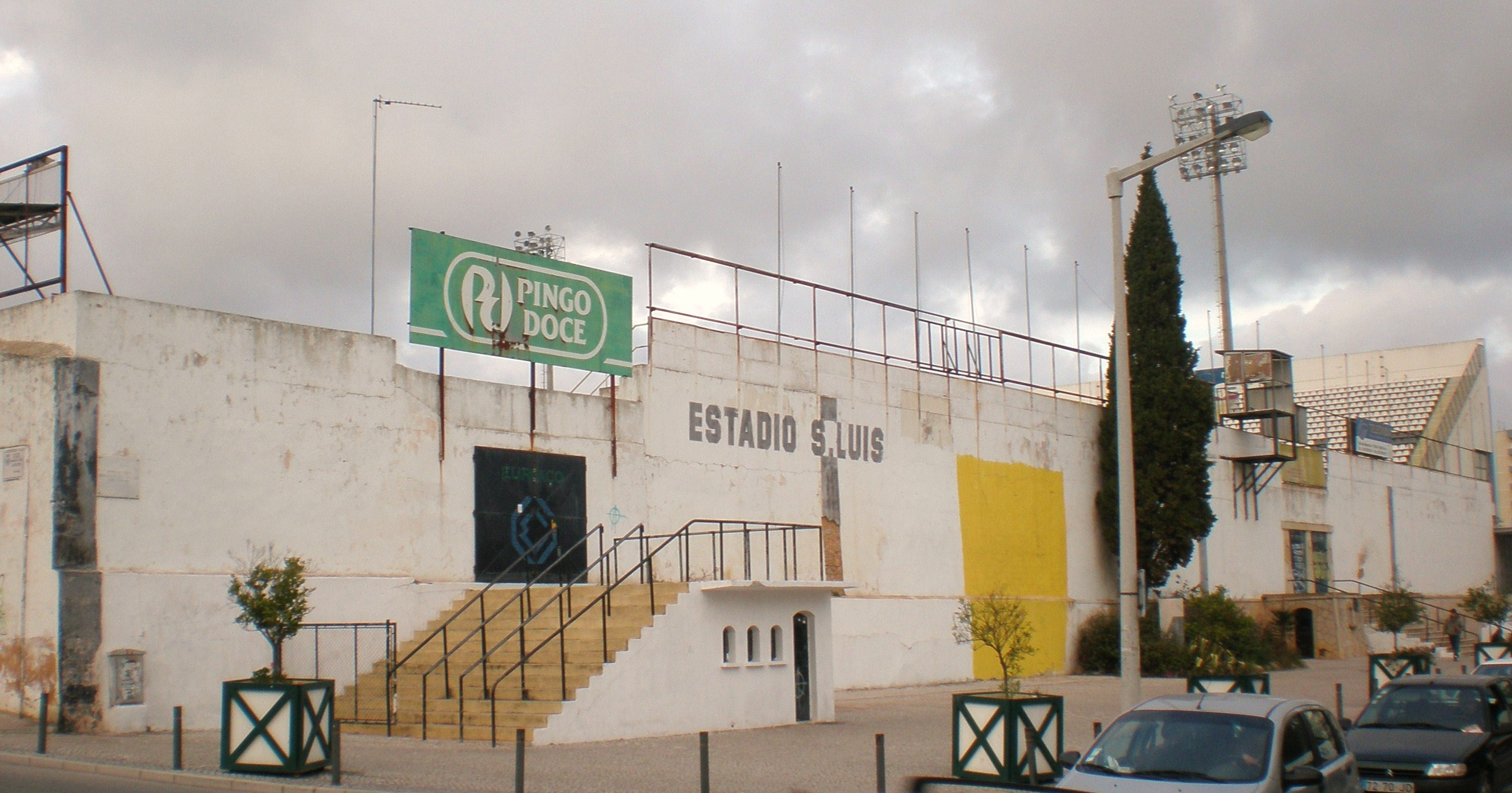
The deteriorated state of the stadium in 2008

In the subsequent years, the Farense club faced financial crises, resulting in a gradual decline through the Portuguese football divisions. In 2006, the senior football team was suspended.

In August 2008, the Stadium was put up for sale at 14 million euros to address Farense's mounting debt, which amounted to 11 million euros, primarily owed to tax authorities and Social Security. However, despite initial offers, all of them fell through just a month later. The proposed buyers could not fulfill their promises, leading to the failure of the sale.

"There was a company, Byteeficaz, that even offered an amount higher than the one requested, but after several promises, the down payment never appeared."
– Aníbal Guerreiro, Sale Commission President of the São Luís Stadium, ex-Vice President of Farense, Farense Club Member No. 1 .

Another obstacle to the sale was the urban plan that restricted the stadium's sale, mandating the preservation of the sports field, pavilion, and club headquarters, limiting construction to about five or six floors.

Retail Park Portugal expressed interest with a proposal exceeding the 14 million euros, but their offer was excluded because they intended to occupy the area where the SCF Gym is, which was not part of the sale.

After a year, the club revived the senior team, which initially played its official matches at the Algarve Stadium in the district leagues before returning to São Luís Stadium upon promotion to and consolidation in national competitions.

In 2013, the most attended game in the past decade took place, with an estimated audience of over ten thousand spectators, a victory against União de Leiria (2–1), securing the team's promotion to the Segunda Liga.

=== Modernization ===
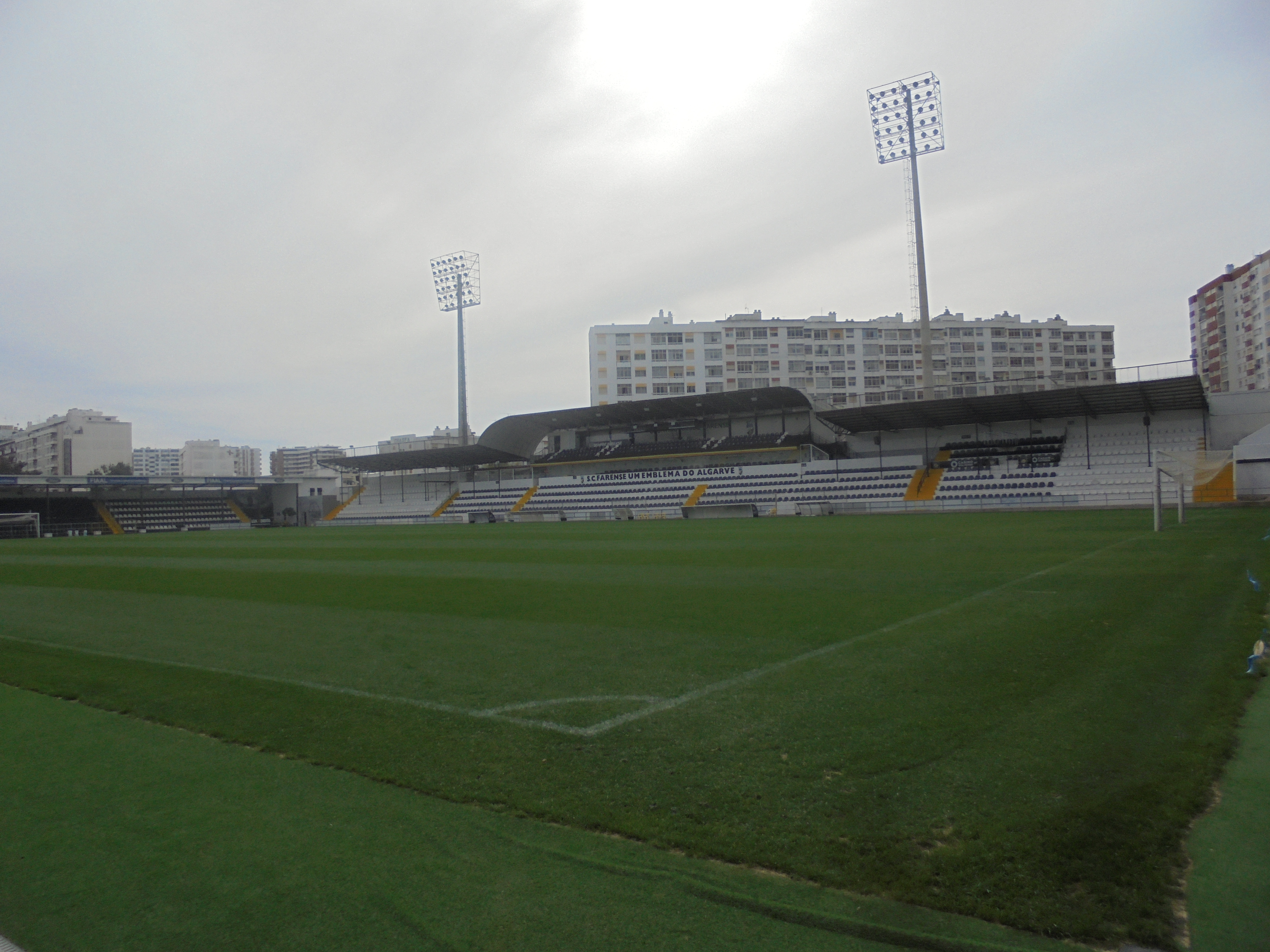
Stadium view in 2020

Around the year 2020, the Faro-based sporting administration (SAD) made an investment of over 500,000 euros to enhance the stadium facilities, ensuring compliance with the elevated standards set by Portuguese football at the higher level.

The investments included upgrading the lighting system, installing a new football pitch, and improving access points and restroom facilities at the stadium.

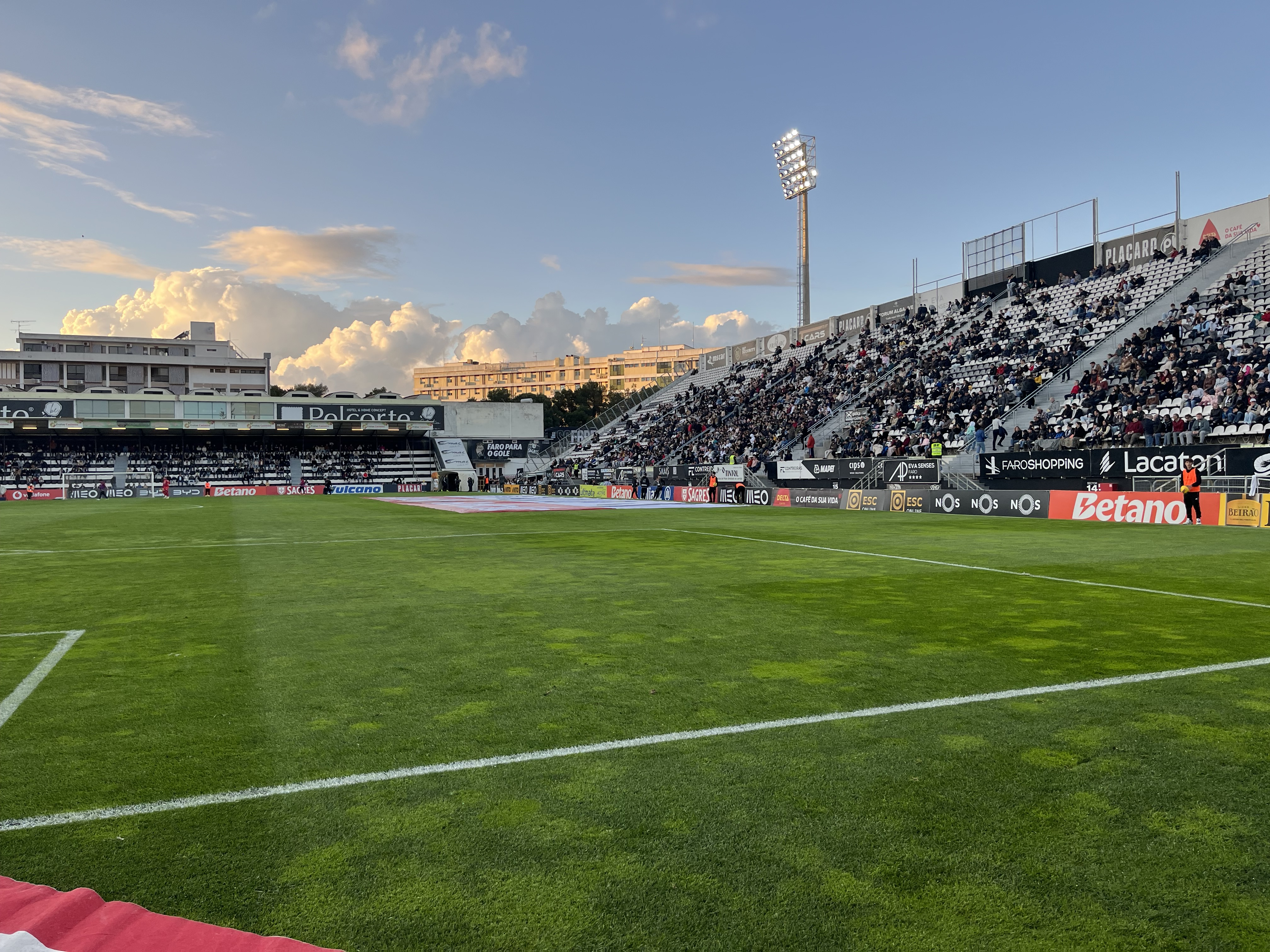
The Estádio do São Luis during a Primeira Liga match between SC Farense and AVS Futebol (March 2025)

Currently, with an official capacity of approximately 7,000 spectators, São Luís Stadium is once again a top-tier venue.

In 2021, the central stand of São Luís Stadium was named in honor of the ex-Vice President of Farense and Farense Club Member No. 1, Aníbal Guerreiro (1932–2023).

=== The Most Relevant Moments ===
- In the 1975/76 season, despite being relegated, Farense secured seven out of their eight victories in the championship at São Luís Stadium, including a win against FC Porto and a historic 5–1 thrashing of SC Braga.
- In November 1977, São Luís Stadium hosted the first of four matches of the national team, with the only official one resulting in a 4–0 victory over Cyprus, part of the World Cup Qualifiers for the following year.
- In June 1988, Farense achieved their biggest victory ever in the top division, defeating SC Covilhã 7–0.
- In the 1989/90 season, Farense reached the final of the Taça de Portugal, securing several home victories along the way. The most notable ones were a 7–0 win against Esperança de Lagos in the round of 32 and a 4–0 victory over UD Valongense in the quarter-finals.
- In the 27th round of the 1994/95 season, Farense thrashed Benfica 4–1, marking their biggest victory against a "big" team.
- A month later, they defeated Vitória SC 3–0 at São Luís Stadium, and in the final match of the season, Hassan Nader scored twice in a 2–0 win over Estrela da Amadora, securing him the title of top scorer and becoming the first Farense player to achieve this feat in the Primeira Liga.
- In September 1995, São Luís Stadium hosted its first European match, but Farense suffered a 0–1 defeat against historic club Lyon.
- The stadium set a record attendance on 28 April 2013, with 14,000 spectators during the match between SC Farense and UD Leiria. SC Farense emerged victorious with a 2–1 scoreline, propelling them to the Segunda Liga.
II Divisão Zona Sul 2012/13
28 April 2013
16h00
Campeonato Jornada 30

SC Farense	2–1	UD Leiria
Bruno Bernardo 2'; Ibukun Akinfenwa 80'	Report	Emiliano Té 74'

São Luís Stadium, Faro
Attendance: 14,000
Referee: André Miguel Furtado Alves Gralha Portugal

== Portugal national team matches ==
The following national team matches were held in the stadium.

#	Date	Score	Opponent	Competition
1.	16 November 1977	4–0	Cyprus	World Cup 1978 qualification
2.	12 February 1992	2–0	Netherlands	Friendly
3.	10 February 1993	1–1	Norway	Friendly
4.	15 August 2001	3–0	Moldova	Friendly

== Events ==
=== Concerts ===
Concerts at São Luís Stadium
Date	Artist	Tour	Setlists
16 April 1977	Art Sullivan		
21 August 1982	Roxy Music	Avalon	1. Avalon; 2. Love Is the Drug; 3. Both Ends Burning; 4. Jealous Guy (John Lennon cover); 5. Like a Hurricane (Neil Young cover); 6. A Song for Europe; 7. Can't Let Go (Bryan Ferry song); 8. Dance Away Play Video stats 9. Editions of You; 10. Out of the Blue; 11. The Main Thing; 12. While My Heart Is Still Beating; 13. Do the Strand; 14. Impossible Guitar (Phil Manzanera song); 15. My Only Love; 16. Tara; 17. Take a Chance With Me; 18. India; 19. Eight Miles High (The Byrds cover); 20. More Than This; 21. Percussion Solo; 22. Virginia Plain
21 August 1982	King Crimson	Beat	1. Thela Hun Ginjeet; 2. Red; 3. Matte Kudasai; 4. The Sheltering Sky; 5. Frame by Frame; 6. Elephant Talk; 7. Indiscipline; 8. Larks' Tongues in Aspic, Part Two
August 1985	Tattoo Militar		
8 August 1989	Roberto Carlos		
25 August 1992	Dire Straits	On Every Street Tour 1991-1992	1. Calling Elvis; 2. Walk of Life; 3. Heavy Fuel; 4. Romeo and Juliet; 5. The Bug; 6. Private Investigations; 7. Sultans of Swing; 8. Your Latest Trick; 9. Fade to Black; 10. On Every Street; 11. Two Young Lovers; 12. Telegraph Road; 13. Brothers in Arms; 14. Money for Nothing; 15. Solid Rock; 16. Wild Theme
21 June 2000	Luciano Pavarotti		

=== Parades ===
==== Marchas Populares ====
The City of Faro's Marchas Populares, organized by the Municipality of Faro in partnership with the Sociedade Recreativa Bordeirense, took place on 18 June 2023. The event featured six participating groups parading along Almeida Carrapato Avenue, with a show starting at 9:00 pm. This event celebrated the authenticity and cultural identity of the southern region of Portugal and attracted visitors to the city during the popular saints' festivities, while also highlighting the active participation of local associations in the city's entertainment.

=== Exhibitions ===
==== Exhibition "De Saint Stadium a Estádio de S. Luís" (1923–2023) ====
The proposed idea involves the development and production of a commemorative exhibition for the centenary of São Luis Stadium (May 1923 – 2023).

The exhibition will be held at the Belmarço Palace, for one year, with the possibility of later being showcased in other public spaces in the city, such as the Faro Municipal Market, University of Algarve, and other suitable buildings.#

With an initial budget of 30,000 euros, the project aims to illuminate the stadium's history and its significance in Faro's urban development, fostering a deeper understanding of the city's heritage among the local community

The urban planning department of Faro is already gathering supporting documentation for the exhibition's narrative. Given the general lack of awareness among the Faro population regarding the local identity and history of this infrastructure, the production of this exhibition will serve as a significant means to explore and appreciate the history of Faro.
