= Comercial Esporte Clube =

Comercial Esporte Clube may refer to:

- Comercial Esporte Clube (SP), São Paulo
- Comercial Esporte Clube (PE), Pernambuco
- Comercial Esporte Clube (MG), Minas Gerais
- Esporte Clube Comercial (MS), Mato Grosso do Sul
- Esporte Clube Comercial (PR), Paraná

== See also ==
- Comercial Futebol Clube (disambiguation)
