= Campo da Constituição =

Former sporting venue in Portugal

- Interactive map of Campo da Constituição
- Location: Porto, Portugal
- Owner: Porto
- Capacity: 20,000

Construction
- Opened: 26 January 1913

Tenant
- Porto (1913–1952)

Campo da Constituição (English: Constitution Field) was a football stadium in Porto, Portugal, which served as the home ground of Porto between 1913 and 1952. Located in the Rua da Constituição (Constitution Street), it was Porto's second ground, after the club moved out of the Campo da Rainha.

== History ==
In 1912, Porto's first ground, the Campo da Rainha, no longer supported the club's growing demands and attendances, so the board searched for a site to build a larger stadium. The estate was leased by a yearly fee of 350 escudos. The ground was officially opened on 26 January 1913 with a tournament between Porto, Benfica, Oporto Cricket and Lawn Tennis Club and Real Fortuna, which saw Benfica emerge as winners.

The growth implied a new ground, the first guidelines appeared in 1933. While the new stadium was being studied (took until 1948 before the estate was chosen and bought), the Campo da Constituição was used and upgraded in 1938 with wooden boxes and a new stand. It was abandoned by the main football team in 1952 when the Estádio das Antas was finished one mile to the east.

The ground underwent extensive renovation works and reopened in 2008, under the name Vitalis Park, as a training complex dedicated in particular to youth trials. The front also hosts a club store.

== Matches ==
Date	Opponent	Score	Notes
5 April 1921	(Spain) Real Madrid	5–0	Friendly match.
23 April 1939	(Portugal) Benfica	3–3	Draw that secured the 1938–39 Primeira Divisão title.
