= Henrique Portela =

Portuguese footballer

Personal information
- Date of birth: Unknown
- Place of birth: Lisbon, Portugal
- Date of death: Unknown
- Position: Midfielder

Senior career*
Years	Team	Apps	(Gls)
1920–1929	Sporting CP		

International career
1922–1923	Portugal	2	(0)
- * Club domestic league appearances and goals

Henrique Portela, was a Portuguese footballer who played as a midfielder.

== International career ==
Portela gained 2 caps for Portugal and made his debut 17 December 1922 in Lisbon against Spain, in a 1–2 defeat.
