= Cipriano Santos =

Portuguese footballer

Cipriano
Personal information
- Full name: Cipriano Nunes dos Santos
- Date of birth: 13 October 1901
- Place of birth: Almada, Portugal
- Date of death: 14 November 1964 (aged 63)
- Position: Goalkeeper

Senior career*
Years	Team	Apps	(Gls)
1922–1932	Sporting		

International career
1926–1928	Portugal	2	(0)
- * Club domestic league appearances and goals

Cipriano Nunes dos Santos (born 13 October 1901 in Almada – Deceased), former Portuguese footballer who played for Sporting and the Portugal national team, as goalkeeper.

== International career ==
Cipriano made his debut for the National team 24 January 1926 in Porto against Czechoslovakia, in a 1–1 draw. He gained 2 caps and was a non-playing member of Portugals squad at the 1928 Football Olympic Tournament.
