= Torres Pereira =

Portuguese footballer

Personal information
- Full name: Alfredo Torres Pereira
- Date of birth: Unknown
- Place of birth: Portugal
- Date of death: Deceased
- Position: Forward

Senior career*
Years	Team	Apps	(Gls)
- Sporting CP

International career
1922	Portugal	1	(0)
- * Club domestic league appearances and goals

Alfredo Torres Pereira was a Portuguese footballer who played as forward.
