= Jaime Gonçalves =

Portuguese footballer

Personal information
- Date of birth: 6 February 1899
- Place of birth: Lisbon, Portugal
- Date of death: Deceased
- Position: Forward

Senior career*
Years	Team	Apps	(Gls)
1914–1927	Sporting		

International career
1922–1925	Portugal	2	(1)
- * Club domestic league appearances and goals

Jaime Gonçalves (born 6 February 1899, date of death unknown) was a Portuguese footballer who played as a forward. He was born in Lisbon.
