= João Maia =

João Maia may refer to:

- João Maia (footballer)
- João Maia (politician)
