= Joaquim Ferreira (footballer) =

Portuguese footballer

Personal information
- Full name: Joaquim Casimiro Rodrigues Ferreira
- Date of birth: 1898
- Place of birth: Portugal
- Date of death: 31 July 1945 (aged 46–47)
- Place of death: Edward VII Park, Lisbon, Portugal
- Position: Defender

Senior career*
Years	Team	Apps	(Gls)
1919–1920	Vitória Setúbal		
1920–1926	Sporting CP		
1926–1933	Vitória Setúbal		

International career
1923–1925	Portugal	2	(0)

Managerial career
- 1945: Sporting CP (assistant)
- 1945: Sporting CP
- * Club domestic league appearances and goals

Joaquim Casimiro Rodrigues Ferreira (1898 – 31 July 1945), is a former Portuguese footballer and manager. As a footballer he played as a central defender for Vitória de Setúbal and Sporting CP and he was capped for Portugal twice.
