= FC Porto =

Association football club in Portugal

Porto
- Full name: Futebol Clube do Porto
- Nicknames: Dragões (Dragons); Azuis e brancos (Blue-and-Whites); Portistas (supporters)
- Short name: FC Porto
- Founded: 28 September 1893; 133 years ago as Foot-Ball Club do Porto (Note: Until 1988, after Pinto da Costa became president of the club in 1982, Porto had celebrated their anniversary on 2 August 1906, and their original founder had been José Monteiro da Costa.)
- Stadium: Estádio do Dragão
- Capacity: 50,033
- President: André Villas-Boas
- Head coach: Francesco Farioli
- League: Primeira Liga
- 2025–26: Primeira Liga, 1st of 18 (champions)
- Website: fcporto.pt
Home colours	Away colours	Third colours

Futebol Clube do Porto, MHIH, OM (Portuguese pronunciation: [futɨˈβɔl ˈkluβɨ ðu ˈpoɾtu]), commonly known as FC Porto, or simply Porto, is a Portuguese professional sports club based in Porto. It is best known for the professional football team playing in the Primeira Liga, the top flight of Portuguese football.

Founded on 28 September 1893, Porto is one of the "Big Three" clubs in Portugal that have never been relegated from Primeira Liga, along with Lisbon-based rivals Benfica and Sporting CP. FC Porto are nicknamed dragões (Dragons), for the mythical creature atop the club's crest, and Azuis e brancos (Blue-and-whites), for the shirt colours. Those colours are in stripes with blue shorts. The club supporters are called portistas. Since 2003, Porto have played their home matches at the Estádio do Dragão, which replaced the previous 51-year-old ground, the Estádio das Antas.

With 88 official major trophies won, Porto is the second most decorated club in Portuguese football. Domestically, these include 31 Portuguese league titles (five of which won consecutively between 1994–95 and 1998–99, a Portuguese football record), 20 Taça de Portugal, 4 Campeonato de Portugal, 1 Taça da Liga and a record 25 Supertaça Cândido de Oliveira. Porto is one of two teams to have won the league title without defeats, in the 2010–11 and 2012–13 seasons. In the former, Porto achieved the largest-ever difference of points between champion and runner-up in a three-points-per-win system (21 points), on their way to a second quadruple.

In international competitions, Porto is the most decorated Portuguese team, with seven trophies. They won the European Cup/UEFA Champions League in 1987 and 2004, the UEFA Cup/Europa League in 2003 and 2011, the UEFA Super Cup in 1987, and the Intercontinental Cup in 1987 and 2004. In addition, they were runners-up in the 1983–84 European Cup Winners' Cup, plus the 2003, 2004 and 2011 editions of the UEFA Super Cup. Porto is the only Portuguese club to have won the UEFA Cup/Europa League, the UEFA Super Cup, the Intercontinental Cup, and to have achieved a continental treble of domestic league, domestic cup and European titles (2002–03 and 2010–11). The club has the fourth-most appearances in the UEFA Champions League group/league stage (27), behind Barcelona (30), Real Madrid (30) and Bayern Munich (29), ranking 9th in the all-time club ranking of the competition. At the end of the 2024–25 season, they ranked 18th in the UEFA club coefficient ranking.

== History ==
=== Early years (1893–1921) ===
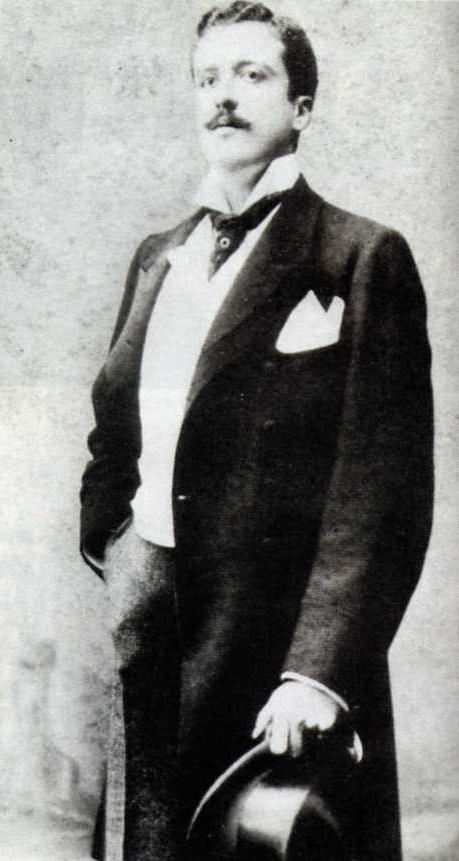
António Nicolau de Almeida, club founder

The club was founded on 28 September 1893 as Foot-Ball Club do Porto by António Nicolau de Almeida, a local port wine merchant and avid sportsman, who became fascinated with football during his trips to England. Porto played its first matches with other Portuguese clubs, including one against Lisbon's Foot-Ball Club Lisbonense on 2 March 1894. This match had the patronage of King Carlos I and Queen Amélie of Orléans, who travelled to Porto to witness the event and present a trophy to the winners.

Almeida's enthusiasm and involvement with the club waned due to family pressure, and by the turn of the century, Porto had entered a period of inactivity. In 1906, José Monteiro da Costa returned to Porto after finishing his studies in England. Like Almeida, thirteen years before, he was also captivated by the English game, and together with some associates, decided to reintroduce the practice of football in the city, outside of the British circles. On 2 August 1906, Porto was revived and Monteiro da Costa appointed its president. Although football was the driving force, the club also promoted other sports, including gymnastics, weightlifting and wrestling, athletics and swimming. Shortly after, Porto rented its first ground and recruited a French coach named Adolphe Cassaigne, who would stay in the club until 1925.

On 15 December 1907, Porto played its first match against a foreign team, hosting Spain's Real Fortuna. In the following month, Porto returned the visit and played its first match abroad. Four years later, the club won the inaugural staging of the José Monteiro da Costa Cup, securing its first-ever major title. In 1912, Porto joined efforts with Leixões to establish the Porto Football Association, which began organising the regional championship in the following year. Porto finished the first season as runners-up, behind local rivals Boavista, but in the following season the club won its first championship. By the end of the 1920–21 season, Porto had been regional champions six times in seven years, and outright winners of the Taça José Monteiro da Costa, after claiming a third consecutive victory in 1916.

=== First national titles and drought years (1921–1977) ===
The 1921–22 season was marked by the creation of the first nationwide football competition – the Campeonato de Portugal. Organised by the national federation, this knockout tournament gathered the winners of the regional championships to determine the Portuguese champion. After clinching its fourth consecutive regional title, Porto defeated Sporting CP in the inaugural edition and became the first national champions. While a dominant regional force, (Note: Porto won the regional championship consecutively between 1918 and 1939.) the club faced stronger opposition in the national championship, winning it only three more times in a span of sixteen years (1925, 1932 and 1937). In 1933–34, Porto was denied participation in the Campeonato de Portugal by its football association for refusing to release players for a match between the Porto and Lisbon regional teams.

In the following season, a second nationwide competition named "Campeonato da Primeira Liga" (English: Premier League Championship), or simply Primeira Liga, was provisionally established by the national federation to increase the number of matches per season and improve the competitiveness of Portuguese football. As the regional champion, Porto qualified for the first edition of the new round-robin competition, winning it with 10 victories in 14 matches. Due to the success of its format, the Primeira Liga was made an official championship competition for the 1938–39 season – its name changed to "Campeonato Nacional da Primeira Divisão" (English: First Division National Championship) or simply Primeira Divisão – and replaced the Campeonato de Portugal, which in turn was converted into the Taça de Portugal, the main domestic cup competition. Porto won the inaugural edition of the new league championship and successfully defended the title in the next season, despite almost failing to take part. (Note: An administrative battle arose between Porto and Académico after a 1939–40 regional championship match between both clubs, which ended prematurely due to numerical inferiority of Porto's team, was repeated by decision of the Porto FA and won by Porto. To solve this situation, the Portuguese Football Federation decided to annul the result from the repetition match – causing Porto to lose the regional title to Leixões and finish in third place, behind Académico. However, the Federation also decided to expand the Primeira Divisão from eight to ten teams, accepting an additional team from the Porto and Setúbal FAs, which resulted in the top-three teams from the Porto regional championship qualifying for the 1939–40 Primeira Divisão.) The club failed to secure a third consecutive title, and after nearly missing again a place in the Primeira Divisão in 1941–42, (Note: Before the 1941–42 season, the federation decided to expand the Primeira Divisão to ten teams, to admit the Braga FA and Algarve FA champions, for the first time. That season, Porto finished the regional championship in third place, which did not grant entry into the Primeira Divisão. However, after consulting every district football association and receiving no opposition to the idea, the federation approved a new expansion of the top-tier league, to twelve teams, which enabled the club to participate.) it would only return to a top-three finish in the 1946–47 season. In 1948, Porto defeated English champions Arsenal 3–2 in a friendly match. To commemorate this victory, the associates offered the club a massive trophy made of 250 kg (550 lb) of silver and wood – the Arsenal Cup.

Chart of yearly table positions of FC Porto in the league.

Having endured a 16-year title drought period, Porto returned to winning ways by taking the 1955–56 Primeira Divisão on head-to-head advantage over runners-up Benfica. Later that season, Porto beat Torreense to win its first Taça de Portugal and achieved its first double. As the Portuguese league winner, Porto made its debut in European competitions by qualifying for the 1956–57 European Cup. The club's first participation was short-lived, ending in the preliminary round with two defeats against Spanish champions Athletic Bilbao. A year later, Porto lifted its second Taça de Portugal by beating Benfica 1–0 in the final. In 1958, Béla Guttmann took charge as coach of Porto and helped them overhaul a five-point lead enjoyed by Benfica to win the Portuguese League title in 1959. The two clubs met in the season's final, but this time Benfica took the trophy and denied a second double for Porto that had won the 1958–59 Primeira Divisão three months before.

Shortly after, the club entered another lacklustre period of its history, the highest point of which was a victory in the 1968 Taça de Portugal final. During this time, Porto had its worst-ever league classification, a ninth place in 1969–70, while its best league record in that period consisted of six runner-up finishes (four consecutive between 1961–62 and 1964–65). In European competitions, the club participated for the first time in the Inter-Cities Fairs Cup (and its successor, the UEFA Cup) and in the Cup Winners' Cup, without getting past the third round. One of the club's most tragic moments occurred on 16 December 1973, when during a league match against Vitória de Setúbal, the 26-year-old captain Pavão fell unconscious on the pitch and died later at the hospital. The following month, Porto presented Peruvian international Teófilo Cubillas, who became one of the club's most successful players, scoring 65 goals in 108 games.

=== International affirmation (1977–1988) ===
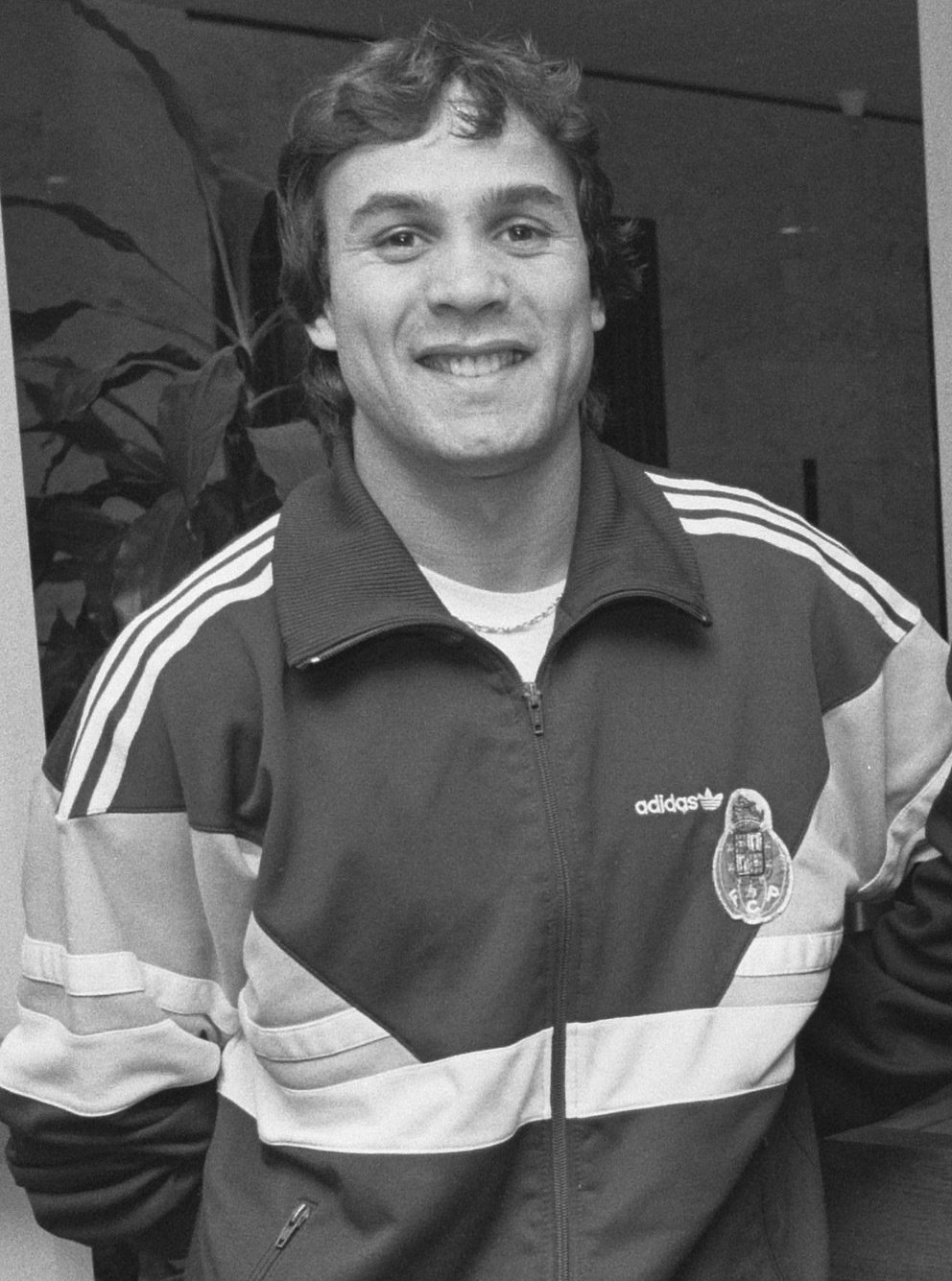
Rabah Madjer was a key figure in Porto's 1987 European Cup Final victory.

The return of José Maria Pedroto – a former Porto player and head coach in the late 1960s – in the 1976–77 season started a new chapter in the club's history. Responsible for the previous cup triumph in 1968, Pedroto guided Porto to its fourth title in the competition. In the following season, he put an end to Porto's league title drought, winning the championship 19 years after having played in the team that took the last title. Internationally, Porto reached the quarter-finals of the 1977–78 Cup Winners' Cup, beating Manchester United along the way, but suffered its heaviest defeat (6–1) against AEK Athens in the subsequent season's European Cup. A poor run of performances in the latter part of the season – resulting in the loss of the league and cup titles – sparked a conflict between the technical staff and president Américo de Sá, which ended with the resignation of Pedroto and his replacement by Hermann Stessl. In December 1981, Porto overcame Benfica to win the inaugural staging of the Portuguese Super Cup, the Supertaça Cândido de Oliveira.

Pedroto returned in April 1982 by the hand of the club's newly elected president Jorge Nuno Pinto da Costa, who had resigned as director of football, two years before, in solidarity with the coach. The previous month, Porto fell again in the Cup Winners' Cup quarter-finals against one of the eventual finalists, but needed only two years to finally reach the competition's final. On 16 May 1984, Porto played its first major European final in Basel's St. Jakob Stadium, losing 2–1 to Michel Platini's Juventus. Already without Pedroto, who stepped down due to illness, Porto won that season's Taça and Supertaça but lost the championship to Benfica. Under the steering of Pedroto's apprentice, Artur Jorge, the following season brought the Primeira Divisão title back to the club and crowned homegrown striker Fernando Gomes as Europe's top goalscorer for the second time, after first taking the award in 1983.

Porto retained the league title in 1986, securing an entry to the 1986–87 European Cup. In the first game, the club recorded its biggest win in European competitions: 9–0 against Maltese side Rabat Ajax. Vítkovice of Czechoslovakia, Brøndby of Denmark, and Dynamo Kyiv of the Soviet Union were successively eliminated as Porto advanced to its first European Cup final, against Bayern Munich. Trailing the Germans 1–0 until the 79th minute, Porto scored twice in two minutes – the first goal through a famous backheel from former Algerian international Rabah Madjer, who assisted Juary for the second – to secure a surprising win and the European Cup title. The following season, under new coach Tomislav Ivic, the club completed a treble of international trophies by beating Ajax for the 1987 European Super Cup and Uruguay's Peñarol for the 1987 Intercontinental Cup. The 1987–88 season was one of the most successful for the club, who also won the Taça de Portugal and an expanded 20-team Primeira Divisão with a record number of goals scored (88) and distance in points to the runners-up (15). (Note: Until the 1995–96 season, league wins were worth two points.)

=== Tri, Tetra, Penta (1988–2001) ===
In contrast to the previous season, Porto failed to win a trophy in 1988–89, with many of its players struck down with injuries, such as Madjer and Gomes. Fifteen years after his first-team debut, Gomes made his last season for Porto, where he became the all-time top goalscorer with 352 goals in 455 matches. The club brought back Artur Jorge, who recovered the Primeira Divisão title in the following season and added the Taça and Supertaça trophies in 1991. His successor, Brazilian Carlos Alberto Silva, won back-to-back league titles in two seasons and qualified Porto for the first UEFA Champions League.

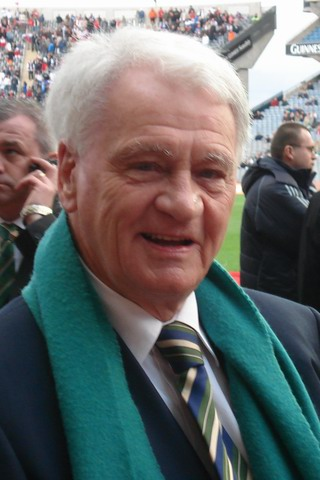
Bobby Robson won the first two of Porto's record five consecutive league titles.

Midway through the 1993–94 season, Porto hired former England manager Bobby Robson, who had been sacked by Sporting CP. The club closed the gap to league winners Benfica, reached the 1993–94 UEFA Champions League semi-finals, and ended the season with a victory over Sporting CP in the Taça de Portugal final. In Robson's first full season, Porto claimed the 1994–95 Primeira Divisão title with a win at Sporting CP's ground and played Benfica four times to secure both the 1993 and 1994 stagings of the Supertaça. The beginning of the season had been clouded by the death of 26-year-old midfielder Rui Filipe, who had scored the club's first league goal. Robson's increasing health problems barred him from leading Porto in the first months of the 1995–96 season, but he returned in time to revalidate the league title. Striker Domingos Paciência became the club's top goalscorer for the second consecutive time and won that season's Bola de Prata, the last win by a Portuguese player.

To fill the void left by the departure of Robson for Barcelona, Porto hired former club captain and Portugal national team manager António Oliveira. Under his command, Porto made history by winning a third consecutive league title (the Tri) for the first time, leaving the runners-up at a distance of 13 points. The club's eighth Supertaça win over Benfica was achieved with a solid performance at the Estádio da Luz that resulted in a 5–0 scoreline. The arrival of Brazilian players Artur and Mário Jardel proved highly productive in the 1996–97 UEFA Champions League, as their goals helped Porto beat Milan in Italy and win its group without defeats. In addition, Jardel would win the first of four consecutive Bola de Prata awards while at Porto. In Oliveira's second and last season at the club, Porto won the Primeira Divisão for the fourth straight season (the Tetra), matching Sporting CP's achievement in the early 1950s, and secured its third double after beating Braga in the 1998 Taça de Portugal Final.

For the 1998–99 season, Porto tasked Portuguese coach Fernando Santos with winning the club's fifth successive Primeira Divisão title (the Penta) – a Portuguese football record. He accomplished this feat, becoming thereafter known as the "Penta engineer" (a pun to his academic degree), and saw Jardel's 36 goals win him the European Golden Shoe. Porto lost the chance to win its sixth straight league title, after finishing four points behind 1999–2000 Primeira Liga champions Sporting, but overcame them to lift its tenth Taça de Portugal trophy. Despite winning the Portuguese cup for the second time in two years, continued failure to retake the league title led to the resignation of Santos at the end of the 2000–01 season.

=== Mourinho's golden years (2001–2004) ===
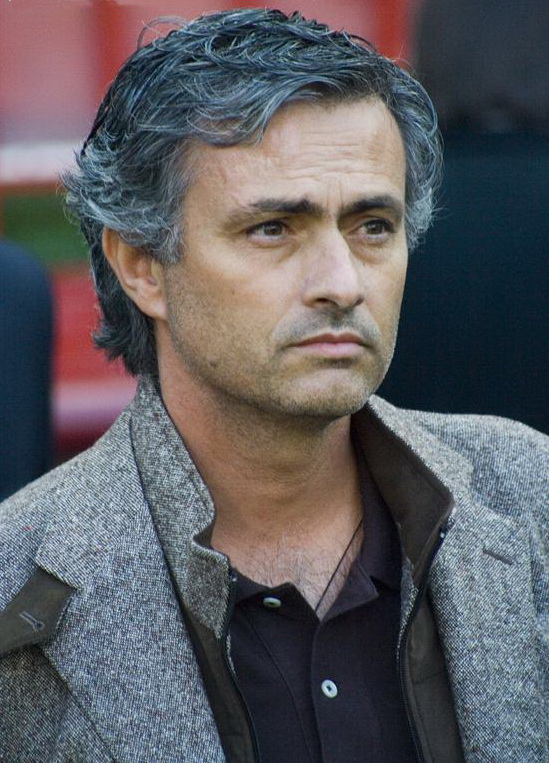
José Mourinho led Porto to consecutive UEFA Cup and UEFA Champions League titles.

The appointment of former club player and assistant coach Octávio Machado to head Porto back to the league title appeared to pay off as the team began the season with a Supertaça win against the 2000–01 Primeira Liga winners, Boavista. However, this would be the only major achievement in a lacklustre season that would culminate with a third place in the league classification – the lowest in 20 years. The elimination from the 2001–02 Taça de Portugal, four days after losing away for the Primeira Liga, precipitated the sacking of Machado after 36 matches in charge.

Two days later, Porto signed União de Leiria's coach, José Mourinho, who had previously worked for the club alongside Robson. In his presentation, Mourinho promptly showcased his personality by stating unequivocally that the club would win next season's league title. He kept true to his promise and delivered one of the club's most successful seasons. Fielding the likes of Deco, Ricardo Carvalho, Maniche, and less known players hired from other Portuguese clubs, such as Paulo Ferreira, Pedro Emanuel, Nuno Valente and Derlei, Porto won the 2002–03 Primeira Liga with relative comfort, finishing 11 points ahead of second-placed Benfica. The club also won the UEFA Cup, defeating Celtic in a dramatic extra-time final, to win its second major European title. Mourinho then secured an unprecedented treble for Porto by winning the Taça de Portugal final against his previous club.

The 2003–04 season began with another 1–0 win over União de Leiria, which gave the club its 13th Supertaça. Weeks later, Porto failed to repeat this success in the 2003 UEFA Super Cup, losing 1–0 to Milan. The departure of striker Hélder Postiga was compensated by the signing of South Africa's Benni McCarthy, whose 20 league goals helped Porto in its league title defense and crowned him the competition's top scorer.

Porto entered the 2003–04 UEFA Champions League directly into the group stage. Porto finished second in its group, losing only once to Real Madrid, and advanced to the round-of-16 where they met Manchester United. After narrowly winning at home (2–1), Porto was on the verge of elimination, being behind by 1–0 till the last minute of official playtime at the second leg at Old Trafford. However, Porto scored the equalizer in the 90th minute of the second leg to draw 1–1 and to advance to the quarter-finals with a 3–2 aggregate win. The team then overcame Lyon and Deportivo La Coruña to reach the Champions League final. Porto defeated Monaco 3–0 to lift the club's second European Champion Clubs' Cup. A 2–1 loss to Benfica in the Taça de Portugal final, held 10 days before, prevented another treble-winning season.

=== Life after Mourinho (2004–2010) ===
The successful European performances of Mourinho's Porto enhanced the reputations of the coach and players like Carvalho, Ferreira and Deco, all of whom left the club in the aftermath of the Champions League victory. The following season was an atypical one, as the club had three coaches: Luigi Delneri, (Note: Delneri never took charge of the team in a competitive match; he was sacked before the start of the season, two months after signing for Porto.) Víctor Fernández and José Couceiro. Under Férnandez, Porto won the 2004 Supertaça Cândido de Oliveira and the 2004 Intercontinental Cup, but lost the 2004 UEFA Super Cup to Valencia and was eliminated prematurely in the 2004–05 Taça de Portugal. Recording only 17 wins in 34 matches, Porto lost the Primeira Liga title to Benfica by three points. During this period, Porto was directly involved in the corruption scandal Apito Dourado.

In 2005–06, Dutch coach Co Adriaanse was picked to reorganise the team and return the club to the top of Portuguese football. His tactical discipline and the contribution of new signings Lucho González and Lisandro López led the club to not only retake the Primeira Liga title but also secure its fifth domestic double, after beating holders Vitória de Setúbal in the Taça de Portugal final. Adriaanse's domestic success did not transfer to the Champions League, as Porto finished in the bottom of its group.

The club began the 2006–07 season with a new coach, Jesualdo Ferreira, signed from neighbours Boavista. Before Ferreira assumed his role, Porto won the season-opening Supertaça, with former club player Rui Barros acting as interim coach. An experienced head coach, Ferreira had never achieved major club level success, but in his first season in Porto he became national champion for the first time. The 2006–07 Primeira Liga title was only secured in a frantic final day, as Porto finished one point above Sporting and two above Benfica. The following season, the club achieved the Tri for the second time in its history – with López clinching the top goalscorer award – but lost the Taça and Supertaça finals to Sporting CP. In May 2008, as result of Apito Dourado, a legal investigation on match fixing in Portuguese football, Porto was fined €150,000 and punished with the loss of six points, while Pinto da Costa was suspended for two years. Porto did not appeal the decision.

Having claimed a sixth league and cup double in the 2008–09 season, Porto was on course to emulate the Penta of the late 1990s, but the series was broken by Benfica in the following season. Although Ferreira won his first Supertaça and defended the Taça de Portugal title, the team's failure to claim a fifth consecutive league – finishing third, outside the Champions League-qualifying places – and a 3–0 defeat against Benfica in the final of the Taça da Liga contributed to his resignation at the end of the season. A home win against Benfica prevented the rivals from celebrating the league title at the Estádio do Dragão. Under Ferreira's steering, Porto always qualified for the Champions League knockout stage, reaching the quarter-finals in 2008–09, where it was eliminated by holders Manchester United.

=== Villas-Boas, Pereira and subsequent years (2010–2017) ===
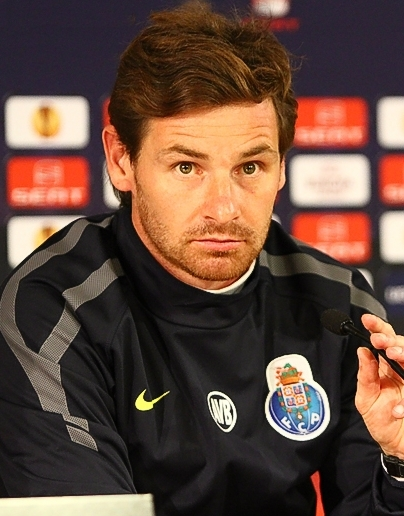
André Villas-Boas won four trophies in one season with Porto, including the UEFA Europa League.

The arrival of Mourinho's former assistant André Villas-Boas, in the spring of 2010, set the stage for a highly successful 2010–11 season, which began with a 2–0 victory over Benfica for the Supertaça. Spearheaded by João Moutinho, Silvestre Varela, Falcao and Hulk (the Bola de Prata winner), Porto performed strongly in the Primeira Liga and assured its 25th title with five matches to play, after beating Benfica in its stadium. In addition, the club broke a number of records: biggest distance between champions and runners-up (21 points), the most consecutive league wins (16), and the highest percentage of points in a 30-game season (93.33%), dropping only six points and finishing the league without defeats, for the first time in its history.

Eight years after the 2003 triumph, Porto returned to the UEFA Cup (renamed UEFA Europa League) and reached the final in Dublin's Aviva Stadium. In an all-Portuguese affair, Porto beat Braga with a goal from the competition's top goalscorer Falcao and lifted the trophy for the second time, as Villas-Boas became the youngest UEFA competition-winning coach. Four days later, Porto won its third consecutive Taça de Portugal with a convincing 6–2 scoreline, securing their fourth trophy of the season.

As Villas-Boas left for Chelsea, Porto recruited the services of his assistant, Vítor Pereira. For the third straight year, the club began the season with another Supertaça title, which was followed by a 2–0 loss to Barcelona for the 2011 UEFA Super Cup. Although lacking the goalscoring prolificacy of Falcao (sold to Atlético Madrid), Porto was able to revalidate the Primeira Liga title, but was eliminated prematurely from the Taça and Champions League competitions. Transferred to the Europa League, Porto failed to defend its title after being knocked out by Manchester City. In the following season, the club went a stage further in both domestic cup competitions and in the Champions League, where it fell to Málaga in the last-16 round. In the 2012–13 Primeira Liga, Porto reduced the distance to leaders Benfica to two points, before hosting them in the penultimate matchday. In a dramatic turn of events, Porto won with a goal in stoppage time and moved to the top of the league table. An away victory in the last game confirmed the Tri and Porto's 27th league title – the second without defeats.

Porto entered the 2013–14 season with a new head coach – Paulo Fonseca, signed from 2012 to 2013 Primeira Liga third-placed Paços de Ferreira – but continued the trend of the previous four seasons by winning the Supertaça. This title would be the highlight of the season, as the club underperformed in every other competition it was involved. In the league, Porto led with five points over its pursuers, but a series of compromising results pushed the club down to third place, resulting in the sacking of Fonseca. Failing to overcome the Champions League group stage, Porto reached the Europa League quarter-finals, where they lost 4–1 to the eventual winners Sevilla. In the following weeks, two semi-final losses against Benfica closed the doors to the finals of the Taça de Portugal and Taça da Liga, the latter at home on penalties.

Porto started the 2014–15 season with their biggest budget ever, hiring Spanish head coach Julen Lopetegui. Despite the signing of many new players, they failed to win any silverware, contributing to the biggest hiatus during Pinto da Costa's presidency. They also equalized, in terms of goals conceded, their biggest defeat in European competitions (6–1 against AEK Athens) and suffered their biggest defeat in the UEFA Champions League (6–1 against Bayern Munich, after the 5–0 loss against Arsenal in 2010). Porto continued their losing trend in the 2015–16 season, making it the second consecutive trophyless season, with the contribution of José Peseiro, who had replaced Julen Lopetegui in January 2016. After the season was over, Peseiro was replaced by Nuno Espírito Santo.

=== Conceição era (2017–2024) ===
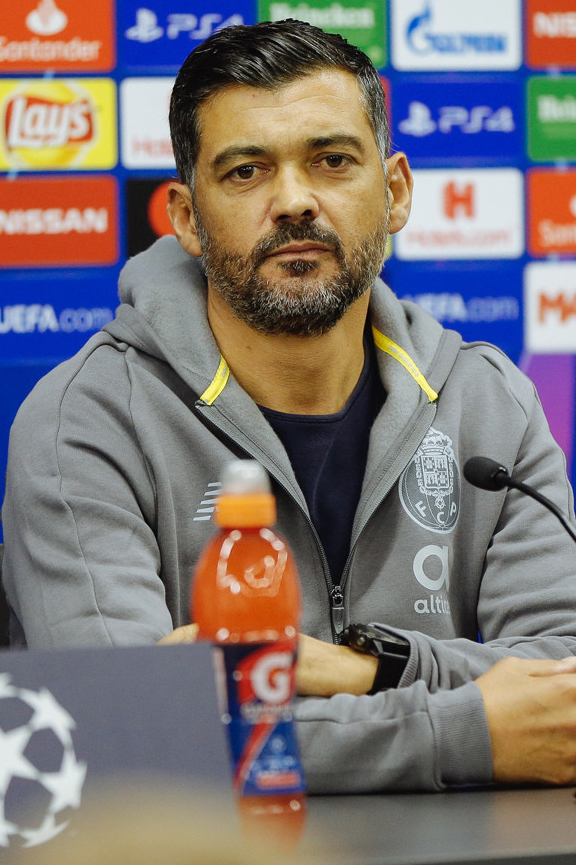
Former Porto player Sérgio Conceição has won eight honours as the club's manager, including three league titles

In the 2017–18 season, after almost five years without winning any trophy, Porto won their 28th league title with the contribution of coach Sérgio Conceição, a former player of the club. The following year, in the 2018–19 UEFA Champions League, Porto managed to reach the quarter-finals of the competition, but were defeated by 6–1 on aggregate against the eventual winners Liverpool.

In the 2019–20 season, Porto managed to recapture the league title, winning it for the 29th time and added for the first time in eleven years the Portuguese cup along with it. However, despite their national success, FC Porto did not reach the group phase of the Champions League and did poorly in their Europa League campaign.

In the 2020–21 UEFA Champions League round of 16, Porto won on away goals rule (4–4 on aggregate) against Juventus, to reach the quarter-finals. The season would, however, end with only one national trophy, the Supertaça.

After having lost the national title to Sporting in the previous season, Porto's 2021–22 season saw them reach various successes at domestic level: with Conceição at the helm for the 5th season in a row, the team recaptured the Primeira Liga, achieving a record 91 points. During the season, the Dragons also set a new record for longest unbeaten run in the league, with 58 matches, a sequence that had been started during the first half of the 2020–21 edition. One week after the league's conclusion, they added the domestic cup, thus securing the second double in Conceição's reign.

On 28 January 2023, still under Conceição, and on their fifth try, Porto won their first ever Taça da Liga title, defeating Sporting CP in the final, thus winning every national trophy available. On 17 December 2023, the team qualified (along with Benfica) to the 2025 FIFA Club World Cup for the first time, as they were the highest-ranked Portuguese club in the UEFA 4-year ranking. At the end of the 2023–2024 season, after having won the Taça de Portugal and coached the team for seven years, Conceição was let go by the newly elected president of FC Porto, André Villas-Boas.

=== New club president, André Villas-Boas (2024–present) ===
On 27 April 2024, André Villas-Boas, who had coached Porto during the 2010–2011 season, was elected the 32º president of Futebol Clube do Porto, succeeding Jorge Nuno Pinto da Costa. He won 80% of the election, with 21,489 out of 26,876 votes. Villas-Boas was keen on making immediate changes at the club, starting with selecting a new coach, Vitor Bruno, who had previously served as the assistant coach under Sérgio Conceição at Porto. Villas-Boas introduced the first women's football team to represent FC Porto, incentivized the promotion of several B team and U-19 players to the main team, and the creation of initiatives to bring the fans closer to the club.

== Crest and kit ==
Period	Kit manufacturer	Shirt sponsor (Note: Only home shirt partner shown.)	Shirt sponsor (back)
1975–1983	Adidas	None	None
1983–1996	Adidas	Revigrés	None
1996–1997	Adidas	Revigrés	Telecel
1997–2000	Kappa	Revigrés	Telecel
2000–2003	Nike	Revigrés	PT
2003–2008	Nike	PT	Banco Espírito Santo
2008–2009	Nike	TMN	Banco Espírito Santo
2009–2011	Nike	TMN	Super Bock
2011–2014	Nike	MEO	Super Bock
2014–2015	Warrior	MEO	Super Bock
2015–2018	New Balance	MEO	Super Bock
2018–2019	New Balance	Altice	Super Bock
2019–2022	New Balance	MEO	Super Bock
2022–	New Balance	Betano	Super Bock

The club's first crest was created in 1910 and consisted of an old blue football with white seams bearing the club name's initials in white. On 26 October 1922, the crest was changed to its present-day appearance after the club approved a design by Augusto Baptista Ferreira (nicknamed "Simplício"), a graphical artist and one of the club's players. In his proposal, the city's coat of arms – consisting at the time of a quartered shield (first and fourth quadrants: national arms; second and third quadrants: image of Our Lady holding baby Jesus and flanked by two towers holding above a banner with the Latin words "Civitas Virginis") surrounded by the collar of the Order of the Tower and Sword and topped by a crown supporting a green dragon with a red banner inscribed with "Invicta" (Undefeated [city]) – was added on top of the old crest, pushing the white letters down.

In 1906, the club's first official team wore kits with a variety of colors and patterns, which included white shirts with red collars or vertical blue stripes, and even red shirts. This indefinition in the equipment was only solved in 1909, when through the initiative of Monteiro da Costa, Porto stipulated in its first statutes that the players had to use "a shirt with blue vertical stripes, black shorts, and personal footwear" as the club's uniform, at every training and match. Some argued that the kit should have included the city colours, green and white. Monteiro da Costa, however, defended the blue-and-white combination because he believed the colors "should be those of the country's flag, and not of the city's flag", hoping that the club would "not only defend the good name of the city, but also that of Portugal, in sporting feuds against foreigners."

In 1975, Adidas became the first sports apparel manufacturers to provide kits for the club. Eight years later, Porto became the first Portuguese team to have a shirt sponsor, after signing a deal with Revigrés worth 10 million escudos per year. This deal lasted for 20 years, with successive renovations, after which the national communications corporation Portugal Telecom (PT) became the new shirt sponsors. Still, Revigrés remain as one of the club's main and longest-serving collaborators.

== Home stadiums ==
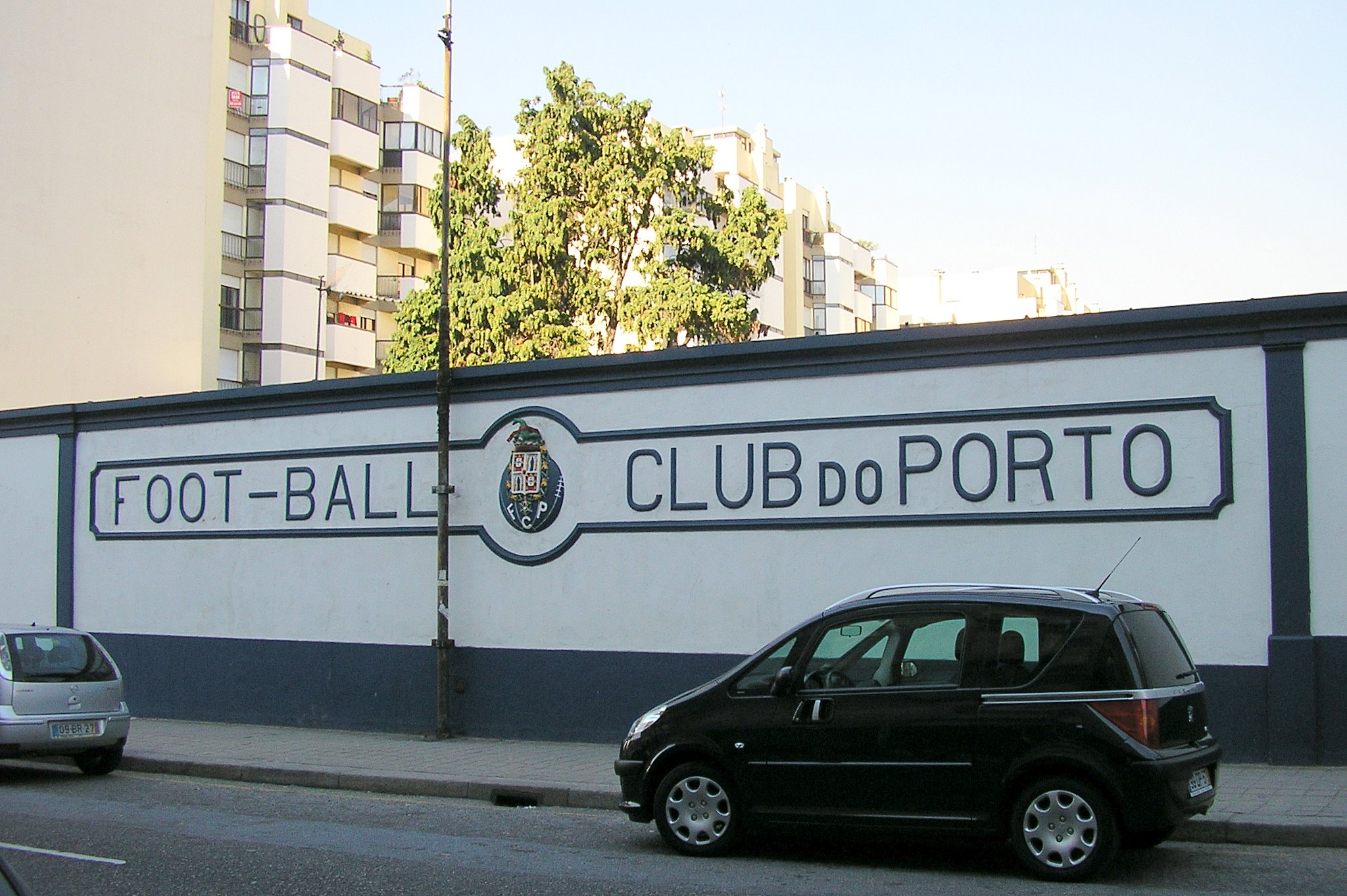
The old Campo da Constituição ground houses the Vitalis Park, the club's youth training camp.

The club's first ground was the Campo da Rainha (Queen's Field), inaugurated in 1906 with an exhibition game against Boavista. The site was located near the residence of Monteiro da Costa and was the property of the city's horticultural society. Aided by his father, a horticultor by profession, Monteiro da Costa rented a portion (30 by 50 meters) of uncultivated terrain to create the first dedicated football pitch in the country. Later that year, the society's vivaria were transferred to another location, allowing Porto to increase the pitch area to match the sport's official dimensions. The ground had capacity for 600 people, including a VIP tribune, and possessed a changing room equipped with showers and sinks, a bar and a gym. The first match between Porto and a foreign team took place at the Campo da Raínha, on 15 December 1907, when the hosts played Spanish side Real Fortuna.

By 1911, the Campo da Raínha was becoming too small for the rapidly growing attendances. After being notified about the sale of the ground for construction of a factory, the club searched for a new ground and rented a terrain near the Constituição street for an annual fee of 350$00. The Campo da Constituição (Constitution Field) was opened in January 1913 with a match against Oporto Cricket and Lawn Tennis Club and hosted Porto's home matches for the regional championship. Eventually, the larger capacity of this ground also became insufficient for the ever-increasing crowds attending the games, particularly against high-profile opponents. On several occasions, between the 1920s and 1940s, Porto played host to matches at the Campo do Ameal (Ameal Field) or the Estádio do Lima (Lima Stadium), home of local rivals Sport Progresso and Académico, respectively. It was in the latter ground that the club achieved their most important victory at the time, as they beat English champions Arsenal 3–2 in a friendly match on 7 May 1948.

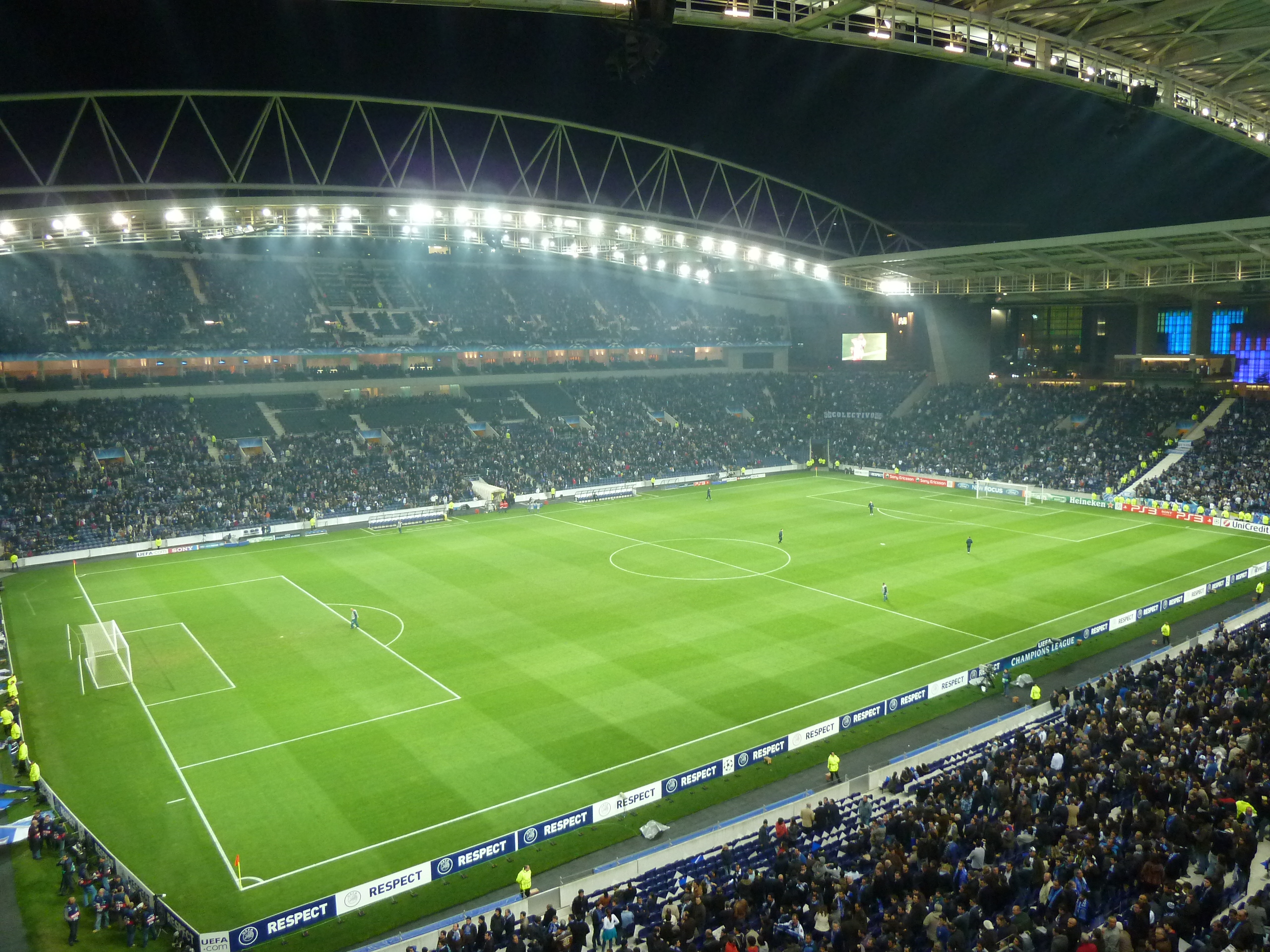
Estádio do Dragão during a UEFA Champions League match

In 1933, Porto approved a plan to build a new stadium to accommodate and meet the demands of larger attendances, but the project only moved forward with the purchase of 48,000 square metres (12 acres) of land in the eastern side of the city in 1947. Designed by Portuguese architects Oldemiro Carneiro and Aires de Sá, the construction of the Estádio do Futebol Clube do Porto – better known as Estádio das Antas (Antas Stadium) for the neighbourhood where it was built – began in January 1950, one month after the first stone was symbolically laid. Two years later, on 28 May 1952, the stadium was inaugurated with a ceremony, featuring the presence of the President of the Republic Francisco Craveiro Lopes, and a match against Benfica, which Porto lost 2–8. The stadium's initial layout had an open east sector (Marathon Door), which was closed in 1976 with the construction of a two-tier stand that raised the capacity to 70,000. In 1986, works to lower the pitch and build an additional tier in the place of the athletics and cycling track were concluded, setting the capacity to a new maximum of 95,000. As stadium safety regulations became stricter during the following decade, the placing of individual seats brought the capacity of the Estádio das Antas down to 55,000 by 1997.

The awarding of the UEFA Euro 2004 hosting rights to Portugal in 1999 was the perfect opportunity for Porto to move into a more modern, functional and comfortable stadium, in line with the demands of high-level international football. The club decided to build an entirely new ground and chose a site located a few hundreds of meters southeast of the Estádio das Antas. The project was commissioned to Portuguese architect Manuel Salgado, and construction took two years to complete at a cost of €98 million. Baptised Estádio do Dragão (Dragon Stadium) by president Pinto da Costa, for the mythological creature placed atop the club's crest, it was officially inaugurated on 16 November 2003 with a match against Barcelona. Porto won 2–0 in front of a record 52,000 spectators, which also witnessed the professional debut of Lionel Messi. In June 2004, the venue hosted the opening ceremony and match of the UEFA Euro 2004, and four other tournament matches. The highest attendance in an official match was registered on 21 April 2004, when 50,818 people saw Porto draw Deportivo La Coruña without goals, for the first leg of the 2003–04 UEFA Champions League semi-finals. For safety reasons, its current capacity is limited to 50,431.

=== Museum ===
On 28 September 2013 The FC Porto Museum was inaugurated, on occasion of the club's 120th anniversary. The museum includes an auditorium, a club store, a coffeehouse, and spaces for educational services and temporary exhibitions.

== Rivalries ==
Porto's biggest rivalries are with the other Big Three members and regular league title contenders, Benfica and Sporting CP. They stem from the historical, political, economical and cultural clash between the cities of Porto and Lisbon, where the other two clubs are based. These rivalries became more intense in the past decades, particularly since Pinto da Costa assumed Porto's presidency in 1982 and adopted a regionalistic and confrontational speech towards Lisbon. In the following years, the club began establishing its dominance in Portuguese football, at the expense of Benfica and Sporting, who had been the traditional powers since the 1940s.

To Porto, the rivalry with Benfica is the strongest and most passionate, and it opposes the most representative football emblems from each city as well as the current most titled Portuguese clubs. The first match between Porto and Benfica – traditionally referred to as O Clássico (The Classic) – took place on 28 April 1912, and ended with a 2–8 win for Benfica; Porto's first victory (3–2) came only in 1920. Until the 2026–27 season, the clubs have faced each other in 261 competitive matches, which have resulted in 104 wins for Porto, 93 for Benfica and 64 draws.

The first meeting between Porto and Sporting CP occurred on 30 November 1919, during a friendly tournament organised by Porto. Their first official encounter was in the first leg of the final of the inaugural Campeonato de Portugal in 1922, which Porto won 2–1 en route to its first national title. Since then, the clubs have met in 257 official matches, with 94 wins for Porto, 87 for Sporting CP and 76 draws. Despite the rivalry, both clubs formed an alliance against Benfica in 2017.

The club also has a strong rivalry with city rivals Boavista, called Dérbi da Invicta. The clubs have met in 152 official matches, with 105 wins for Porto, 23 for Boavista and 24 draws.

== Records and statistics ==
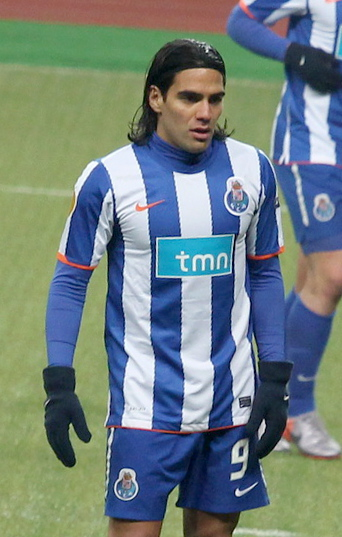
Radamel Falcao holds the club record for top goalscorer in European competitions.

Former defender João Pinto holds the record for most matches played in all competitions (587) and in the Primeira Liga (408), while former goalkeeper Vítor Baía has the most appearances in international competitions (99). Baía is also the most titled player, having won 25 trophies during his career in Porto. Portuguese striker Fernando Gomes is the all-time club goalscorer in all competitions (352), having also scored the most league goals (288). In European competitions, Porto's record goalscorer is Radamel Falcao, with 22 goals.

José Maria Pedroto is the longest-serving coach, having taken charge of the team for 327 matches in nine seasons, while Jesualdo Ferreira became the first Portuguese coach to win three consecutive league titles (2006–2009). André Villas-Boas's victorious campaign in the 2010–11 UEFA Europa League made him the youngest coach ever to win a European competition.

The 2010–11 season was particularly strong in record achievements. Porto played the most matches (58) and secured the most wins (49) and highest winning percentage (84.4%). For the league, it had the most consecutive wins (16) and suffered the fewest defeats (none). In Europe, the club won the most matches (14 in 17) and scored the most goals (44) en route to the UEFA Europa League title – one of a record-matching four.

In April 2022, Porto set a national record of 58 matches without defeats in the Primeira Liga after losing 1–0 to Braga for the first time since the end of October 2020. The team also matched the same unbeaten league run (58) as AC Milan and Olympiacos achieved in their respective domestic leagues.

=== Recent seasons ===
Below are listed the club's performances in the past ten seasons:

Season	Pos	Pld	W	D	L	GF	GA	Pts	Top league scorer(s)	Goals	Top overall scorer(s)	Goals	TP	TL	ST	UCL	UEL	Other competitions	
2016–17	2nd	34	22	10	2	71	19	76	André Silva	16	André Silva	21	4R	3R	–	R16	–	–	
2017–18	1st	34	28	4	2	82	18	88	Moussa Marega	22	Vincent Aboubakar	26	SF	SF	–	R16	–	–	
2018–19	2nd	34	27	4	3	74	20	85	Tiquinho Soares	15	Tiquinho Soares	22	RU	RU	W	QF	–	–	
2019–20	1st	34	26	4	4	74	22	82	Moussa Marega	12	Francisco Soares	19	W	RU	–	PO	R32	–	
2020–21	2nd	34	24	8	2	74	29	80	Mehdi Taremi	16	Mehdi Taremi	23	SF	SF	W	QF	–	–	
2021–22	1st	34	29	4	1	86	22	91	Mehdi Taremi	20	Mehdi Taremi	26	W	3R	–	GS	R16	–	
2022–23	2nd	34	27	4	3	73	22	85	Mehdi Taremi	22	Mehdi Taremi	31	W	W	W	R16	–	–	
2023–24	3rd	34	22	6	6	63	27	72	Evanilson	13	Evanilson	25	W	3R	RU	R16	–	–	
2024–25	3rd	34	22	5	7	65	30	71	Samu Aghehowa	19	Samu Aghehowa	27	4R	SF	W	–	KPO	FIFA Club World Cup	GS
2025–26	1st	34	28	4	2	66	18	88	Samu Aghehowa	13	Samu Aghehowa	20	SF	QF	–	–	QF	–	

- Last updated: 16 May 2026
- 3R = Third Round; 4R = Fourth Round; GS = Group stage; QF = Quarter-finals; PO = Play-off Round; KPO = Knockout Phase Play-offs; R16 = Round of 16; R32 = Round of 32; R64 = Round of 64; RU = Runners-up; SF = Semi-finals; W = Winners

=== UEFA club coefficient ranking ===
As of 2 June 2025

Rank	Team	Points
15	(Portugal) Benfica	87.750
16	(Italy) Atalanta	82.000
17	(Spain) Villarreal	82.000
18	(Portugal) Porto	79.750
19	(Italy) Milan	78.000
20	(Germany) RB Leipzig	78.000
21	(Italy) Lazio	76.000

== Honours ==
As of 1 August 2026, Porto have 88 major trophies in senior football. Domestically, they have won 31 Portuguese league titles, 20 Taça de Portugal, 1 Taça da Liga, 4 Campeonato de Portugal (a record shared with Sporting CP), and a record 25 Supertaça Cândido de Oliveira. Porto is the most decorated Portuguese team in international competitions, having won two European Cup/UEFA Champions League, two UEFA Cup/UEFA Europa League, one UEFA Super Cup and two Intercontinental Cup trophies. In addition, it is the only Portuguese team to have won either the UEFA Cup/UEFA Europa League, the UEFA Super Cup or the Intercontinental Cup.

Porto have achieved four titles in a single season on two occasions: in 1987–88 (UEFA Super Cup, Intercontinental Cup, Primeira Liga and Taça de Portugal) and in 2010–11 (Supertaça, Primeira Liga, UEFA Europa League and Taça de Portugal). The latter also included the club's second continental treble, after the one achieved in 2002–03 (Primeira Liga, Taça de Portugal and UEFA Cup). The club also reached the Cup Winners' Cup final in 1983–84 (losing to Juventus) and made three more appearances in the UEFA Super Cup (2003, 2004 and 2011).

Type	Competition	Titles	Seasons
Domestic	Primeira Liga	31	1934–35, 1938–39, 1939–40, 1955–56, 1958–59, 1977–78, 1978–79, 1984–85, 1985–86, 1987–88, 1989–90, 1991–92, 1992–93, 1994–95, 1995–96, 1996–97, 1997–98, 1998–99, 2002–03, 2003–04, 2005–06, 2006–07, 2007–08, 2008–09, 2010–11, 2011–12, 2012–13, 2017–18, 2019–20, 2021–22, 2025–26
Domestic	Taça de Portugal	20	1955–56, 1957–58, 1967–68, 1976–77, 1983–84, 1987–88, 1990–91, 1993–94, 1997–98, 1999–2000, 2000–01, 2002–03, 2005–06, 2008–09, 2009–10, 2010–11, 2019–20, 2021–22, 2022–23, 2023–24
Domestic	Taça da Liga	1	2022–23
Domestic	Supertaça Cândido de Oliveira	25	1981, 1983, 1984, 1986, 1990, 1991, 1993, 1994, 1996, 1998, 1999, 2001, 2003, 2004, 2006, 2009, 2010, 2011, 2012, 2013, 2018, 2020, 2022, 2024, 2026
Domestic	Campeonato de Portugal	4^{s}	1921–22, 1924–25, 1931–32, 1936–37
Continental	European Cup / UEFA Champions League	2	1986–87, 2003–04
Continental	UEFA Cup / UEFA Europa League	2	2002–03, 2010–11
Continental	UEFA Super Cup	1	1987
Global	Intercontinental Cup	2	1987, 2004

- record
- ^{s} shared record

== Players ==
=== Current squad ===
As of 30 September 2026

Note: Flags indicate national team as defined under FIFA eligibility rules; some limited exceptions apply. Players may hold more than one non-FIFA nationality.

No.	Pos.	Nation	Player
4	DF	POL	Jakub Kiwior
5	DF	POL	Jan Bednarek
6	DF	ENG	Chris Smalling
7	FW	BRA	William Gomes
8	MF	DEN	Victor Froholdt
9	FW	ESP	Samu Aghehowa
10	MF	ESP	Gabri Veiga
11	FW	BRA	Pepê
12	DF	NGR	Zaidu Sanusi
13	MF	DOM	Pablo Rosario
14	GK	POR	Cláudio Ramos
15	MF	POR	Vasco Sousa
16	MF	KOR	Hwang In-beom
17	FW	ESP	Borja Sainz
18	DF	ARG	Nehuén Pérez

No.	Pos.	Nation	Player
19	FW	POR	André Silva
20	DF	POR	Alberto Costa
21	DF	CRO	Dominik Prpić
22	MF	ARG	Alan Varela (vice-captain)
24	GK	POR	João Costa
29	FW	MEX	Santiago Giménez (on loan from AC Milan)
33	DF	BRA	Souza (on loan from Tottenham Hotspur)
37	FW	BRA	Gabriel Mec
42	MF	CIV	Seko Fofana (on loan from Rennes)
50	GK	POR	João Afonso
52	DF	POR	Martim Fernandes
74	DF	POR	Francisco Moura
77	FW	POL	Oskar Pietuszewski
99	GK	POR	Diogo Costa (captain)

=== Other players ===
Note: Flags indicate national team as defined under FIFA eligibility rules; some limited exceptions apply. Players may hold more than one non-FIFA nationality.

No.	Pos.	Nation	Player
—	FW	BRA	Gabriel Veron

=== Out on loan ===
Note: Flags indicate national team as defined under FIFA eligibility rules; some limited exceptions apply. Players may hold more than one non-FIFA nationality.

No.	Pos.	Nation	Player
—	MF	ESP	Iván Jaime (at Las Palmas until 30 June 2026)
—	MF	ARG	Tomás Pérez (at Atlético Mineiro until 31 December 2026)

== Personnel ==
=== Technical staff ===
Position	Staff
Head coach	(Italy) Francesco Farioli
Assistant coach(es)	(Netherlands) Dave Vos (Argentina) Lucho González (Portugal) Lino Godinho (Portugal) André Castro (Spain) Felipe Sánchez
Goalkeeper coach(es)	(Portugal) Diogo Almeida (Netherlands) Erik Heijblok
Fitness coach(es)	(England) Callum Walsh
Analyst(s)	(Turkey) Osman Kul
Team doctor	(Portugal) Nélson Puga
Nurses	(Portugal) José Macedo (Portugal) José Mário Almeida
Recovery specialist(s)	(Portugal) Telmo Sousa (Portugal) Manuel Vitor
Physiotherapist(s)	(Portugal) Álvaro Magalhães (Portugal) Joca (Portugal) José Ribeiro (Portugal) Nuno Vicente (Portugal) Rúben Silva

Last updated: 1 August 2026
Source: FC Porto

=== Management ===
Position	Staff
President	André Villas-Boas
Vice-presidents	Rui Pedroto; João Borges; Tiago Madureira; Francisco Araújo; José Andrade
President of the General Assembly Board	António Tavares
President of the Fiscal and Disciplinary Council	Angelino Ferreira
Sporting director	Vacant
Director of Professional Football	Vacant
Director of Youth Football	José Tavares
Director of Women's Football	José Manuel Ferreira
Director of Scouting	Paulo Araújo
Director of Performance	Pedro Miguel Silva

Last updated: 18 July 2025
Source: FC Porto

== Organisation ==
After going public in 1997, Porto created several satellite companies:

- FC Porto – youth football, basketball, handball, roller hockey, athletics, club's magazine, etc.
- FC Porto – Futebol SAD (professional football company); SAD stands for Sociedade Anónima Desportiva
- Porto Estádio (stadium management)
- Porto Multimédia (official site and multimedia products)
- Porto Comercial (merchandising)
- Porto Seguro (insurance)

The FCPorto SAD is listed in the Euronext Lisbon stock exchange.

== Media ==
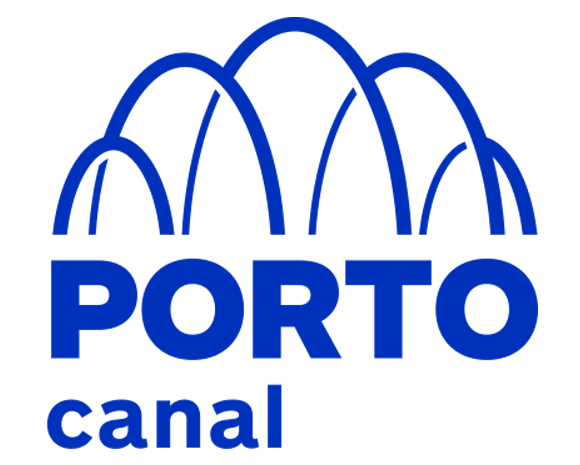

Porto Canal is a television channel owned and operated by Porto, which broadcasts generalist, regional, and club-related content through cable, satellite and IPTV. The channel's programming includes live transmission of the home matches of the reserve and youth football teams, as well as of the senior basketball, handball, roller hockey, futsal, women's football and women's volleyball teams. Founded in 2006, the channel began a managing partnership with Porto in 2011, and on 17 July 2015 was fully purchased and integrated into the club.

The club also issues Dragões, an official monthly magazine that publishes articles and interviews of the teams, players and other club-related content and a daily newsletter called Dragões Diário.

== Other sports ==
=== Active sections ===
Men

- Basketball
- Basketball (intellectual disability)
- Football (cerebral palsy)
- Futsal
- Futsal (intellectual disability)
- Goalball
- Handball
- Roller hockey
- Table tennis (intellectual disability)
- Wheelchair basketball

Women

- Football
- Volleyball

Mixed

- Billiards
- Boccia
- Boxing
- Esports
- Swimming

=== Discontinued sections ===
- Artistic skating
- Athletics
- Beach soccer
- Car racing
- Chess
- Cycling
- Handball (11-a-side)
- Field hockey
- Gymnastics
- Karate
- Rugby
- Shooting
- Sport fishing
- Table tennis
- Tennis
- Water polo
- Weightlifting

== See also ==
- List of world champion football clubs
- FC Porto de Macau

== Bibliography ==
- Bandeira, João Pedro (2012). Bíblia do FC Porto (in Portuguese). Lisbon: Prime Books. ISBN 9789896550943.
- Tovar, Rui (2011). Almanaque do FC Porto 1893–2011 (in Portuguese). Alfragide: Caderno. ISBN 9789892315430.
