= 1983 Taça de Portugal final =

- Event: 1982–83 Taça de Portugal
Porto	Benfica
0	1
- Date: 21 August 1983
- Venue: Estádio das Antas, Porto
- Referee: Mário Luís (Santarém)

The 1983 Taça de Portugal final was the final match of the 1982–83 Taça de Portugal, the 43rd season of the Taça de Portugal, the premier Portuguese football cup competition organized by the Portuguese Football Federation (FPF). The match was played on 21 August 1983 at the Estádio das Antas in Porto, and opposed two Primeira Liga sides: Benfica and Porto. Benfica defeated Porto 1–0 to claim an eighteenth Taça de Portugal. The final was played at the start of the following season, in August, and was played at F.C. Porto's home ground Estádio das Antas, after huge discussions about the place of the final. In spite of the home soil advantage, Porto could not stop Benfica from winning 1–0.

In Portugal, the final was televised live on RTP. As Benfica claimed both league and cup double in the same season, cup runners-up Porto faced their cup final opponents in the 1983 Supertaça Cândido de Oliveira.

== Match ==
=== Details ===
21 August 1983

Porto	0–1	Benfica
		Carlos Manuel 20'

Estádio das Antas, Porto
Referee: Mário Luís (Santarém)

Porto	Benfica

GK	1	(Portugal) Zé Beto
DF	(Portugal) António Lima Pereira (c)
DF	(Portugal) Eurico Gomes
DF	(Portugal) Augusto Inácio	(substituted off) 45'
DF	(Portugal) João Pinto
MF	(Portugal) Jaime Pacheco	(substituted off) 45'
MF	(Portugal) António Sousa
MF	(Portugal) António Frasco
MF	(Portugal) Jaime Magalhães
FW	(Portugal) Jacques Pereira
FW	(Portugal) Fernando Gomes	Booked
Substitutes:
GK	(Portugal) António Amaral
DF	(Portugal) Eduardo Luís
MF	(Portugal) Rodolfo Reis	(substituted on) 45'
MF	(Portugal) José Alberto Costa
FW	(Republic of Ireland) Mickey Walsh	(substituted on) 45'
Manager:
(Portugal) José Maria Pedroto

GK	1	(Portugal) Manuel Bento (c)
DF	(Portugal) António Veloso
DF	(Portugal) Minervino Pietra
DF	(Portugal) António Oliveira
DF	(Portugal) António Bastos Lopes
DF	(Portugal) Álvaro Magalhães
MF	(Portugal) José Luís
MF	(Sweden) Glenn Strömberg	(substituted off) 85'
MF	(Portugal) Carlos Manuel
FW	(Socialist Federal Republic of Yugoslavia) Zoran Filipović	(substituted off) 59'
FW	(Portugal) Nené
Substitutes:
GK	(Portugal) Delgado
DF	(Portugal) Carlos Pereira
MF	(Portugal) Diamantino Miranda
MF	(Portugal) Shéu	(substituted on) 85'
MF	(Portugal) Paulo Padinha	(substituted on) 59'
Manager:
(Sweden) Sven-Göran Eriksson

1982–83 Taça de Portugal Winners
Benfica
18th Title

Match officials

- Assistant referees:
- Fourth official:

Match rules

- 90 minutes.
- 30 minutes of extra time if necessary.
- Maximum of two substitutions

== See also ==
- O Clássico
- 1982–83 S.L. Benfica season
