= 1983–84 S.L. Benfica season =

Benfica
1983–84 season
- President: Fernando Martins
- Head coach: Sven-Göran Eriksson
- Stadium: Estádio da Luz
- Primeira Divisão: 1st
- Taça de Portugal: Round of 16
- European Cup: Quarter-finals
- Supertaça: Runners-up
- Iberian Cup: Winners
- Top goalscorer: League: Nené (21); All: Nené (30)
Home colours

The 1983–84 season was Sport Lisboa e Benfica's 80th season in existence and the club's 50th consecutive season in the top flight of Portuguese football, covering the period from 1 July 1983 to 30 June 1984. Benfica competed domestically in the Primeira Divisão, Taça de Portugal and the Supertaça Cândido de Oliveira, and participated in the European Cup after winning the previous league. They also played in the Iberian Cup with the La Liga winners, Athletic Bilbao.

In the second year of Eriksson at Benfica, he lost João Alves and Frederico Rosa but hired António Oliveira and Michael Manniche. Benfica started the season by winning the Portuguese Cup final of the past season and the Iberian Cup. In the league, Benfica started strong until their drop points in October. A home win against Porto propelled them into first place, which they never lost. Twelve consecutive wins followed until they were stopped in February. In March, Benfica was knocked out of Europe and lost for the first time in the league. They reacted with five wins and a draw in the next month, before losing for a second time in late April. In May, Benfica confirmed their 26th league title, as Eriksson departed the club in June.

== Season summary ==
Benfica entered the new season having won the league, and reached the Portuguese Cup final and the UEFA Cup final. Due to conflict between Porto and the Portuguese Football Federation, the final for the Taça de Portugal did not take place and was postponed. During the transfer window, Benfica lost João Alves and Frederico Rosa, who opted not to renew their contracts. New signings included centre-back, António Oliveira and striker, Michael Manniche. The latter replaced Cláudio Adão, who stayed just one month in the club. The pre-season began on 17 July, with medical tests, followed by roughly two weeks of training sessions. Benfica made their presentation game to the fans on 31 July with Coventry City, and competed in North America, with Tecos and Toronto Blizzard. The pre-season closed with the Lisbon International Tournament, which they won. On 10 August, it was confirmed that the Portuguese Cup final of the past season would be played on the 21, at Estádio das Antas. The first official game was the Iberian Cup with the La Liga winners, Athletic Bilbao. In a competition sponsored by the Portuguese Football Federation and the Royal Spanish Football Federation, that joined the Primeira Divisão and La Liga Champions in a two-legged Super cup.

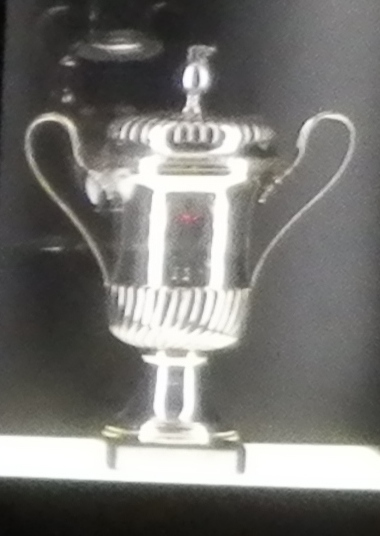
The Iberian Cup trophy on display at Museu Cosme Damião

Benfica first visited the San Mamés Stadium on the 17, losing 2–1. A week later, they received Bilbao at home and won by 3–1, thus keeping the trophy. Between that, Benfica played the Portuguese Cup final with Porto, winning one-nil with a goal from Carlos Manuel. The league campaign started in the best of terms, with four consecutive wins, while in the European Cup, Benfica eliminated Linfield in the first round. In October, they dropped the first points, in a draw with Braga, which left the club in second, a point shy of the leader Porto, their next opponent. In the Clássico, Benfica beat his rival Porto and assumed first place. Later in the month, Benfica defeated Olympiacos in the second round of the European Cup, qualifying for the quarter-final. In November and December, Benfica won all their league matches, but lost the Supertaça Cândido de Oliveira to Porto.

Benfica kept on winning in the Primeira Divisão in January, lapping the first part of league with a three-point lead. However they suffered a set-back in the Taça de Portugal, losing 2–1 in Estádio de Alvalade being eliminated by Sporting. In February, Benfica lost points again in the league after twelve consecutive wins. March was even more troublesome because the team was knocked-out of the European Cup by Liverpool, while in the league, Porto gave them their first league loss all season. Still, in the following month, Benfica won five games and draw one, allowing them to keep the three point lead over Porto. On 29 April, Benfica unexpectedly lost 4–1 with Vitória de Guimarães. The loss did not cause major damage because Porto had also lost points, so the distance was only cut to two points. The very next match-day, the Lisbon derby with Sporting, Benfica drew one-all but still celebrated their 26th league title, due to Porto having lost on the same day. Against an opponent that broke the record for the fewest goals conceded in the history of the Primeira Divisão and had won all of their matches at home, Benfica responded with more goals scored, and a better record in away games, only losing six points there all season. Nené with 21 goals in 26 goals came in second place in the Bola de Prata, because he had played in more games, but oddly, with fewer minutes in overall. In June, Sven-Göran Eriksson announced his departure to Roma, having won back-to-back league titles in his two-year stint in Portugal.

== Competitions ==
Win Draw Loss Postponed

=== Overall record ===
Competition	First match	Last match	Record								
Competition	First match	Last match	G	W	D	L	GF	GA	GD	Win %	Source
Primeira Divisão	28 August 1983	13 May 1984	30	24	4	2	86	22	+64	80.00	
Taça de Portugal	6 November 1983	29 January 1984	4	3	0	1	14	3	+11	75.00	
European Cup	14 September 1983	21 March 1984	6	3	0	3	10	8	+2	50.00	
Supertaça Cândido de Oliveira	8 December 1983	14 December 1983	2	0	1	1	1	2	−1	0.00	
Iberian Cup	17 August 1983	24 August 1983	2	1	0	1	4	3	+1	50.00	
Total			44	31	5	8	115	38	+77	70.45	

=== Supertaça Cândido de Oliveira ===
8 December 1983 First leg	Porto	0–0	Benfica	Porto
21:30				Stadium: Estádio das Antas; Referee: Ezequiel Feijão

14 December 1983 Second leg	Benfica	1–2	Porto	Lisbon
20:30	Manniche 12'		Frasco 20'; Vermelhinho 64'	Stadium: Estádio da Luz; Referee: Veiga Trigo

=== Iberian Cup ===
17 August 1983 First leg	Athletic Bilbao (Spain)	2–1	(Portugal) Benfica	Bilbao
	Sola 16'; De Andrés 86'		Nené 79'	Stadium: San Mamés Stadium; Attendance: 35,000; Referee: Victoriano Sánchez Arminio

24 August 1983 Second leg	Benfica (Portugal)	3–1	(Spain) Athletic Bilbao	Lisbon
	Filipovic 23'; Nené 30', 44'		Sola 70'	Stadium: Estádio da Luz; Attendance: 35,000; Referee: Rosa Santos

=== Primeira Divisão ===
==== League table ====
Pos	Team	Pld	W	D	L	GF	GA	GD	Pts	Qualification or relegation
1	Benfica (C)	30	24	4	2	86	22	+64	52	Qualification to European Cup first round
2	Porto	30	22	5	3	65	9	+56	49	Qualification to Cup Winners' Cup first round (Note: Porto qualified for the Cup Winners' Cup as Portuguese Cup winners)
3	Sporting CP	30	19	4	7	58	24	+34	42	Qualification to UEFA Cup first round
4	Braga	30	15	7	8	40	32	+8	37	Qualification to UEFA Cup first round
5	Vitória de Setúbal	30	13	8	9	43	28	+15	34	

Source: RSSSF and footballzz.co.uk
(C) Champions

==== Results by round ====
Round	1	2	3	4	5	6	7	8	9	10	11	12	13	14	15	16	17	18	19	20	21	22	23	24	25	26	27	28	29	30
Ground	A	H	A	H	A	H	H	A	H	A	H	A	H	A	H	H	A	H	A	H	A	A	H	A	H	A	H	A	H	A
Result	W	W	W	W	D	W	W	W	W	W	W	W	W	W	W	W	W	D	W	W	L	W	W	D	W	W	W	L	D	W
Position	3	3	3	2	3	1	1	1	1	1	1	1	1	1	1	1	1	1	1	1	1	1	1	1	1	1	1	1	1	1

Source: ForaDeJogo
A = Away; H = Home; W = Win; D = Draw; L = Loss

==== Matches ====
28 August 1983 1	Vitória de Setúbal	2–3	Benfica	Setúbal
19:00	Freire 15'; Jorge Plácido 70'	Report	Carlos Manuel 12'; Humberto Coelho 35'; Filipovic 86'	Stadium: Estádio do Bonfim; Referee: Santos Ruivo

3 September 1983 2	Benfica	1–0	Rio Ave	Lisbon
19:30	Filipovic 86'	Report		Stadium: Estádio da Luz; Referee: Ramiro Santiago

11 September 1983 3	Estoril Praia	1–4	Benfica	Estoril
18:30	José Pedro 40'	Report	Carlos Manuel 31', 63'; Nené 60'; Manniche 78'	Stadium: Estádio António Coimbra da Mota; Referee: Albino Rodrigues

24 September 1983 4	Benfica	2–0	Águeda	Lisbon
19:45	Manniche 75'; Diamantino 86' (pen.)	Report		Stadium: Estádio da Luz; Referee: Francisco Silva

2 October 1983 5	Braga	1–1	Benfica	Braga
19:00	Jorge Gomes 25'	Report	Filipovic 79'	Stadium: Estádio 1º de Maio; Referee: Mário Luís

9 October 1983 6	Benfica	1–0	Porto	Lisbon
20:00	Diamantino 62'	Report		Stadium: Estádio da Luz; Referee: Alder Dante

15 October 1983 7	Benfica	6–2	Farense	Lisbon
19:00	Diamantino 34', 65'; Chalana 40'; José Luís 43' (pen.), 79'; Nené 71'	Report	Alexandre Alhinho 26'; José Rafael 78'	Stadium: Estádio da Luz; Referee: José Guedes

19 November 1983 8	Penafiel	0–3	Benfica	Penafiel
19:00		Report	Filipovic 20'; Diamantino 26', 30'	Stadium: Estádio Municipal 25 de Abril; Referee: Rosa Santos

26 November 1983 9	Benfica	2–0	Varzim	Lisbon
19:20	Chalana 20'; Filipovic 62'	Report		Stadium: Estádio da Luz; Referee: Azevedo Duarte

4 December 1983 10	Boavista	1–2	Benfica	Porto
19:30	Jorge Silva 57'	Report	Filipovic 10'; Diamantino 32' (pen.)	Stadium: Estádio do Bessa; Referee: Marques Pires

11 December 1983 11	Benfica	3–0	Salgueiros	Lisbon
19:00	Manniche 22'; Carlos Manuel 34'; Shéu 49'	Report		Stadium: Estádio da Luz; Referee: Raúl Ribeiro

18 December 1983 12	Espinho	0–2	Benfica	Espinho
19:30	Valério (yellow card) 71' (yellow-red card) 76'	Report	Nené 29'; Manniche 90'	Stadium: Estádio Comendador Manuel Violas; Referee: Graça Oliva

7 January 1984 13	Benfica	8–0	Vitória de Guimarães	Lisbon
19:30	Diamantino 23', 38'; José Luís 34'; Manniche 55', 57'; Strömberg 58'; Nené 72', 82'	Report		Stadium: Estádio da Luz; Referee: Carlos Valente

15 January 1984 14	Sporting	0–1	Benfica	Lisbon
20:00		Report	Nené 85' (pen.)	Stadium: Estádio de Alvalade; Referee: Vítor Correia

22 January 1984 15	Benfica	1–0	Portimonense	Lisbon
19:00	Pietra 52'	Report		Stadium: Estádio da Luz; Referee: Fernando Alberto

5 February 1984 16	Benfica	1–0	Vitória de Setúbal	Lisbon
19:30	Chalana 36'	Report		Stadium: Estádio da Luz; Referee: Rosa Santos

11 February 1984 17	Rio Ave	2–3	Benfica	Vila do Conde
18:00	N'Habola 37'; Quim 76'	Report	Diamantino 12'; Chalana 50' (pen.); Oliveira 64'	Stadium: Campo da Avenida; Referee: Ezequiel Feijão

19 February 1984 18	Benfica	1–1	Estoril Praia	Lisbon
18:00	Diamantino 68'; (yellow card) 0' (yellow-red card) 50' Filipovic	Report	José Pedro 75'	Stadium: Estádio da Luz; Referee: António Ferreira

26 February 1984 19	Águeda	1–4	Benfica	Águeda
18:30	César 23'	Report	Nené 19' (pen.), 62'; Diamantino 55'; Paulo César 87' (o.g.)	Stadium: Estádio Municipal de Águeda; Referee: Carlos Valente

3 March 1984 20	Benfica	7–0	Braga	Lisbon
19:00	Pietra 5'; José Luís 20'; Nené 37', 59', 67'; Diamantino 44'; Chalana 75'	Report		Stadium: Estádio da Luz; Referee: Raúl Nazaré

11 March 1984 21	Porto	3–1	Benfica	Porto
19:30	Sousa 22'; Walsh 56'; Oliveira 71' (o.g.)	Report	Nené 57'	Stadium: Estádio das Antas; Referee: Alder Dante

17 March 1984 22	Farense	2–7	Benfica	Faro
19:00	Mário Wilson 23'; Rogério 69'	Report	Nené 6' (pen.), 57', 66'; Manniche 12', 34'; Strömberg 32'; Chalana 59'	Stadium: Estádio de São Luís; Referee: Carlos Valente

25 March 1984 23	Benfica	8–0	Penafiel	Lisbon
18:30	Nené 19', 53', 69', 85'; Diamantino 34'; Carlos Manuel 36'; Manniche 38'; Strömberg 75'	Report		Stadium: Estádio da Luz; Referee: João Rosa

1 April 1984 24	Varzim	1–1	Benfica	Póvoa de Varzim
19:00	Folha 30'	Report	José Luís 43'	Stadium: Estádio do Varzim SC; Referee: Marques Pires

8 April 1984 25	Benfica	1–0	Boavista	Lisbon
20:45	Manniche 33'	Report		Stadium: Estádio da Luz; Referee: Francisco Silva

15 April 1984 26	Salgueiros	0–2	Benfica	Porto
19:00		Report	Diamantino 37', 64'	Stadium: Estádio Engenheiro Vidal Pinheiro; Referee: Carvalho Araújo

21 April 1984 27	Benfica	6–0	Espinho	Lisbon
19:45	Diamantino 29', 55', 82'; Manniche 39'; Álvaro 53'; Nené 70'	Report		Stadium: Estádio da Luz; Referee: Manuel Correia

29 April 1984 28	Vitória de Guimarães	4–1	Benfica	Guimarães
19:00	Gregório Freixo 10'; Paulo Ricardo 13', 18'; Alfredo Murça 56'	Report	Pietra 91'	Stadium: Estádio D. Afonso Henriques; Referee: Carlos Valente

6 May 1984 29	Benfica	1–1	Sporting	Lisbon
20:00	Chalana 17'	Report	Kostov 66'	Stadium: Estádio da Luz; Referee: Marques Pires

13 May 1984 30	Portimonense	0–2	Benfica	Portimão
19:00		Report	Nené 67'; Shéu 78'	Stadium: Estádio Municipal de Portimão; Referee: Graça Oliva

=== Taça de Portugal ===
==== 1982–83 Edition ====
21 August 1983 Final	Porto	0–1	Benfica	Porto
17:00		Report	Carlos Manuel 20'	Stadium: Estádio das Antas; Attendance: 70,000; Referee: Mário Luís

==== 1983–84 Edition ====
6 November 1983 Second Rd	Estarreja	0–3	Benfica	Estarreja
16:00		Report	Diamantino 15' (pen.); Nené 86', 89'	Stadium: Campo Dr. Tavares da Silva; Attendance: 3,000; Referee: Isidro Santos

1 December 1983 Third Rd	Casa Pia	1–6	Benfica	Lisbon
16:00	José Luís 89'	Report	Nené 1', 53'; Manniche 38', 54'; Strömberg 44'; Carlos Manuel 86'	Stadium: Estádio Pina Manique; Attendance: 4,000; Referee: João Rosa

30 December 1983 Fourth Rd	Benfica	4–0	Desportivo de Chaves	Lisbon
18:00	Diamantino 44', 55'; Manniche 51'; Álvaro 78'	Report		Stadium: Estádio da Luz; Attendance: 30,000; Referee: Gil Rosa

29 January 1984 Round of 16	Sporting	2–1	Benfica	Lisbon
20:00	Rui Jordão 58'; Zezinho (red card) 62'; Manuel Fernandes 78'	Report	8' (red card) 62' Carlos Manuel	Stadium: Estádio de Alvalade; Attendance: 50,000; Referee: Alder Dante

=== European Cup ===
==== First round ====
14 September 1983 First leg	Benfica (Portugal)	3–0	(Northern Ireland) Linfield	Lisbon
20:00	Diamantino 72'; Nené 83'; Manniche 89'	Report		Stadium: Estádio da Luz; Attendance: 32,000; Referee: Gérard Biguet

28 September 1983 Second leg	Linfield (Northern Ireland)	2–3 (2–6 agg.)	(Portugal) Benfica	Belfast
19:30	Diamantino 29' (o.g.); Walsh 81'	Report	Strömberg 36', 75'; Diamantino 39'	Stadium: Windsor Park; Attendance: 9,133; Referee: Henning Lund-Sørensen

==== Second round ====
19 October 1983 First leg	Olympiacos (Greece)	1–0	(Portugal) Benfica	Athens
20:30	Anastopoulos 21'	Report		Stadium: OAKA Spyros Louis; Attendance: 75,537; Referee: Edvard Sostaric

2 November 1983 Second leg	Benfica (Portugal)	3–0 (3–1 agg.)	(Greece) Olympiacos	Lisbon
21:00	Filipovic 17'; Diamantino 28'; Manniche 76'	Report		Stadium: Estádio da Luz; Attendance: 65,000; Referee: Neil Midgley

==== Quarter-final ====
7 March 1984 First leg	Liverpool (England)	1–0	(Portugal) Benfica	Liverpool
19:30	Rush 67'	Report		Stadium: Anfield; Attendance: 39,096; Referee: Heinz Fahnler

21 March 1984 Second leg	Benfica (Portugal)	1–4 (1–5 agg.)	(England) Liverpool	Lisbon
21:00	Nené 73'	Report	Whelan 9', 87'; Johnston 32'; Rush 78'	Stadium: Estádio da Luz; Attendance: 70,000; Referee: Volker Roth

=== Friendlies ===
31 July 1983	Benfica	2–2	Coventry City	Lisbon
	Diamantino 16', 53'		Butterworth 77'; Bamber 82'	Stadium: Estádio da Luz; Attendance: 35,000; Referee: Vítor Correia

6 August 1983	Tecos	1–3	Benfica	San Jose
			Nené; Diamantino

8 August 1983 Toronto TM	Toronto Blizzard	1–0 (a.e.t.)	Benfica	Toronto
				Stadium: Varsity Stadium

13 August 1983 Lisbon TM	Benfica	2–1	Vasas	Lisbon
21:00				Stadium: Estádio da Luz

14 August 1984 Lisbon TM	Benfica	2–1	Sporting	Lisbon
	Nené 24'; Veloso 88'		Manuel Fernandes 59'	Stadium: Estádio da Luz; Referee: Alder Dante

6 October 1983 Taça de Honra	Estoril Praia	4–5	Benfica	Lisbon
			Manniche; Chalana; Amilcar	Stadium: Estádio António Coimbra da Mota

11 October 1983 Taça de Honra	Benfica	1–0	Belenenses	Lisbon
	Paulo Padinha 86'			Stadium: Estádio da Luz

4 March 1984	Benfica	0–5	Hvidovre	Lisbon
				Stadium: Estádio da Luz; Referee: Carlos Esteves

15 May 1984	Vitória de Setúbal	1–1	Benfica	Setúbal
	Roçadas 65'		Carlos Manuel 40'	Stadium: Estádio do Bonfim; Attendance: 10,000; Referee: Gil Rosa

== Player statistics ==
The squad for the season consisted of the players listed in the tables below, as well as staff member Sven-Goran Eriksson (manager), Toni (assistant manager), Eusébio (assistant manager), Júlio Borges (Director of Football), Amilcar Miranda (Doctor).

Note 1: Note: Flags indicate national team as defined under FIFA eligibility rules. Players may hold more than one non-FIFA nationality.

Note 2: Players with squad numbers marked ‡ joined the club during the 1983-84 season via transfer, with more details in the following section.

No.	Pos	Nat	Player	Total		Primeira Divisão		Taça de Portugal		European Cup		Supertaça		Iberian Cup	
No.	Pos	Nat	Player	Apps	Goals	Apps	Goals	Apps	Goals	Apps	Goals	Apps	Goals	Apps	Goals
1	GK	(Portugal)	Manuel Bento	43	0	29	0	4	0	6	0	2	0	2	0
2	DF	(Portugal)	Minervino Pietra	39	3	27	3	3	0	5	0	2	0	2	0
2	DF	(Portugal)	António Veloso	16	0	12	0	0	0	2	0	0	0	2	0
3^{‡}	DF	(Portugal)	António Oliveira	36	1	24	1	4	0	4	0	2	0	2	0
3	DF	(Portugal)	Humberto Coelho	3	1	2	1	1	0	0	0	0	0	0	0
3	DF	(Portugal)	Álvaro Magalhães	44	2	30	1	4	1	6	0	2	0	2	0
4	DF	(Portugal)	Samuel Quina	1	0	0	0	1	0	0	0	0	0	0	0
4	DF	(Portugal)	Alberto Bastos Lopes	6	0	5	0	1	0	0	0	0	0	0	0
5	DF	(Portugal)	António Bastos Lopes	41	0	28	0	3	0	6	0	2	0	2	0
6	MF	(Portugal)	José Luís	41	4	29	4	4	0	4	0	2	0	2	0
6	MF	(Portugal)	Carlos Manuel	42	7	28	5	4	2	6	0	2	0	2	0
7	FW	(Portugal)	Nené	38	30	26	21	3	4	5	2	2	0	2	3
8	MF	(Sweden)	Glenn Strömberg	38	6	25	3	3	1	6	2	2	0	2	0
8^{‡}	FW	(Denmark)	Michael Manniche	33	16	21	11	4	3	6	2	1	0	1	0
9	FW	(Socialist Federal Republic of Yugoslavia)	Zoran Filipovic	16	9	8	7	0	0	5	1	1	0	2	1
9	FW	(Portugal)	Paulo Padinha	5	0	2	0	1	0	1	0	0	0	1	0
10	MF	(Portugal)	Fernando Chalana	33	7	23	7	4	0	4	0	2	0	0	0
11	MF	(Portugal)	Diamantino Miranda	42	26	29	19	3	3	6	3	2	1	2	0
11	MF	(Portugal)	Shéu	38	2	27	2	4	0	3	0	2	0	2	0
12	GK	(Portugal)	Delgado	3	0	2	0	1	0	0	0	0	0	0	0

== Transfers ==
=== In ===
Entry date	Position	Player	From club	Fee	Ref
22 July 1983	DF	António Oliveira	Marítimo	Undisclosed	
22 July 1983	FW	Cláudio Adão	Al Ain	Free	
24 August 1983	FW	Michael Manniche	Hvidovre	Undisclosed	
24 August 1983	GK	Neno	Barreirense	Undisclosed	

=== Out ===
Entry date	Position	Player	From club	Fee	Ref
15 July 1983	MF	João Alves	Boavista	Free	
19 July 1983	DF	Frederico Rosa	Boavista	Free	
24 August 1983	MF	Carlos Manuel II	Rio Ave	Free	
30 August 1983	FW	Cláudio Adão	Flamengo	Free	

=== Out by loan ===
Exit date	Position	Player	To club	Return date	Ref
20 July 1983	FW	Fernando Folha	Varzim	30 June 1984	
24 August 1983	GK	Neno	Barreirense	30 June 1984	
