= UEFA Euro 1984 squads =

These are the squads for the 1984 European Football Championship tournament in France, which took place between 12 June and 27 June 1984. For this tournament, UEFA reduced the squad size from 22 to 20 players. The players' listed ages is their age on the tournament's opening day (12 June 1984).

== Group 1 ==
=== Belgium ===
Manager: Guy Thys

No.	Pos.	Player	Date of birth (age)	Caps	Club
1	GK	Jean-Marie Pfaff	4 December 1953 (aged 30)	41	(West Germany) Bayern Munich
2	DF	Georges Grün	25 January 1962 (aged 22)	0	(Belgium) Anderlecht
3	DF	Paul Lambrichts	16 October 1954 (aged 29)	15	(Belgium) Beveren-Waas
4	DF	Leo Clijsters	6 November 1956 (aged 27)	5	(Belgium) Waterschei Thor
5	DF	Michel De Wolf	19 January 1958 (aged 26)	9	(Belgium) Gent
6	MF	Franky Vercauteren	28 October 1956 (aged 27)	35	(Belgium) Anderlecht
7	MF	René Vandereycken	22 July 1953 (aged 30)	37	(Belgium) Anderlecht
8	MF	Nico Claesen	1 October 1962 (aged 21)	5	(Belgium) Seraing
9	FW	Erwin Vandenbergh	26 January 1959 (aged 25)	30	(Belgium) Anderlecht
10	MF	Ludo Coeck	26 September 1955 (aged 28)	44	(Italy) Internazionale
11	MF	Jan Ceulemans (captain)	28 February 1957 (aged 27)	44	(Belgium) Club Brugge
12	GK	Jacky Munaron	8 September 1956 (aged 27)	4	(Belgium) Anderlecht
13	DF	Marc Baecke	24 July 1956 (aged 27)	15	(Belgium) Beveren-Waas
14	MF	Walter De Greef	13 November 1957 (aged 26)	2	(Belgium) Anderlecht
15	DF	René Verheyen	20 March 1952 (aged 32)	23	(Belgium) Club Brugge
16	MF	Enzo Scifo	19 February 1966 (aged 18)	2	(Belgium) Anderlecht
17	MF	Eddy Voordeckers	4 February 1960 (aged 24)	15	(Belgium) Waterschei Thor
18	FW	Alexandre Czerniatynski	28 July 1960 (aged 23)	16	(Belgium) Anderlecht
19	MF	Raymond Mommens	27 December 1958 (aged 25)	13	(Belgium) Lokeren
20	GK	Wim De Coninck	23 July 1959 (aged 24)	0	(Belgium) Waregem

=== Denmark ===
Manager: (West Germany) Sepp Piontek

No.	Pos.	Player	Date of birth (age)	Caps	Club
1	GK	Ole Kjær	16 August 1954 (aged 29)	26	(Denmark) Esbjerg
2	DF	Ole Rasmussen	19 March 1952 (aged 32)	38	(West Germany) Hertha BSC
3	DF	Søren Busk	10 April 1953 (aged 31)	29	(Belgium) Gent
4	DF	Morten Olsen (captain)	14 August 1949 (aged 34)	62	(Belgium) Anderlecht
5	DF	Ivan Nielsen	9 October 1956 (aged 27)	16	(Netherlands) Feyenoord
6	MF	Søren Lerby	1 February 1958 (aged 26)	37	(West Germany) Bayern Munich
7	MF	Jens Jørn Bertelsen	15 February 1952 (aged 32)	44	(Belgium) Seraing
8	MF	Jesper Olsen	20 March 1961 (aged 23)	16	(Netherlands) Ajax
9	MF	Allan Simonsen	15 December 1952 (aged 31)	46	(Denmark) Vejle
10	FW	Preben Elkjær	11 September 1957 (aged 26)	38	(Belgium) Lokeren
11	FW	Klaus Berggreen	3 February 1958 (aged 26)	14	(Italy) Pisa
12	MF	Jan Mølby	4 July 1963 (aged 20)	8	(Netherlands) Ajax
13	MF	John Lauridsen	2 April 1959 (aged 25)	15	(Spain) Espanyol
14	FW	Michael Laudrup	15 June 1964 (aged 19)	13	(Italy) Lazio
15	MF	Frank Arnesen	30 September 1956 (aged 27)	31	(Belgium) Anderlecht
16	GK	Troels Rasmussen	7 April 1961 (aged 23)	7	(Denmark) AGF
17	FW	Steen Thychosen	22 September 1958 (aged 25)	1	(Denmark) Vejle
18	DF	John Sivebæk	25 October 1961 (aged 22)	20	(Denmark) Vejle
19	FW	Kenneth Brylle	22 May 1959 (aged 25)	8	(Belgium) Anderlecht
20	GK	Ole Qvist	25 February 1950 (aged 34)	25	(Denmark) KB

=== France ===
Manager: Michel Hidalgo

No.	Pos.	Player	Date of birth (age)	Caps	Club
1	GK	Joël Bats	4 January 1957 (aged 27)	7	(France) Auxerre
2	DF	Manuel Amoros	1 February 1962 (aged 22)	21	(France) Monaco
3	DF	Jean-François Domergue	23 June 1957 (aged 26)	1	(France) Toulouse
4	DF	Maxime Bossis	26 June 1955 (aged 28)	55	(France) Nantes
5	DF	Patrick Battiston	12 March 1957 (aged 27)	31	(France) Bordeaux
6	MF	Luis Fernandez	2 October 1959 (aged 24)	12	(France) Paris Saint-Germain
7	MF	Jean-Marc Ferreri	26 December 1962 (aged 21)	9	(France) Auxerre
8	MF	Daniel Bravo	9 February 1963 (aged 21)	8	(France) Monaco
9	MF	Bernard Genghini	18 January 1958 (aged 26)	22	(France) Monaco
10	MF	Michel Platini (captain)	21 June 1955 (aged 28)	48	(Italy) Juventus
11	MF	Bruno Bellone	14 March 1962 (aged 22)	14	(France) Monaco
12	MF	Alain Giresse	2 August 1952 (aged 31)	28	(France) Bordeaux
13	MF	Didier Six	21 August 1954 (aged 29)	49	(France) Mulhouse
14	MF	Jean Tigana	23 June 1955 (aged 28)	28	(France) Bordeaux
15	DF	Yvon Le Roux	19 April 1960 (aged 24)	9	(France) Monaco
16	FW	Dominique Rocheteau	14 January 1955 (aged 29)	37	(France) Paris Saint-Germain
17	FW	Bernard Lacombe	15 August 1952 (aged 31)	34	(France) Bordeaux
18	DF	Thierry Tusseau	19 January 1958 (aged 26)	10	(France) Bordeaux
19	GK	Philippe Bergeroo	13 January 1954 (aged 30)	3	(France) Toulouse
20	GK	Albert Rust	10 October 1953 (aged 30)	0	(France) Sochaux

=== Yugoslavia ===
Manager: Todor Veselinović

No.	Pos.	Player	Date of birth (age)	Caps	Club
1	GK	Zoran Simović	2 November 1954 (aged 29)	8	(Socialist Federal Republic of Yugoslavia) Hajduk Split
2	DF	Nenad Stojković	26 May 1957 (aged 27)	29	(Socialist Federal Republic of Yugoslavia) Partizan
3	DF	Mirsad Baljić	4 March 1962 (aged 22)	8	(Socialist Federal Republic of Yugoslavia) Željezničar
4	DF	Srečko Katanec	16 July 1963 (aged 20)	13	(Socialist Federal Republic of Yugoslavia) Olimpija Ljubljana
5	DF	Velimir Zajec (captain)	12 February 1956 (aged 28)	28	(Socialist Federal Republic of Yugoslavia) Dinamo Zagreb
6	DF	Ljubomir Radanović	21 July 1960 (aged 23)	15	(Socialist Federal Republic of Yugoslavia) Partizan
7	MF	Miloš Šestić	8 August 1956 (aged 27)	21	(Socialist Federal Republic of Yugoslavia) Red Star Belgrade
8	MF	Ivan Gudelj	21 September 1960 (aged 23)	17	(Socialist Federal Republic of Yugoslavia) Hajduk Split
9	MF	Safet Sušić	13 April 1955 (aged 29)	32	(France) Paris Saint-Germain
10	MF	Mehmed Baždarević	20 September 1960 (aged 23)	13	(Socialist Federal Republic of Yugoslavia) Željezničar
11	FW	Zlatko Vujović	26 August 1958 (aged 25)	35	(Socialist Federal Republic of Yugoslavia) Hajduk Split
12	GK	Tomislav Ivković	11 August 1960 (aged 23)	13	(Socialist Federal Republic of Yugoslavia) Red Star Belgrade
13	DF	Faruk Hadžibegić	7 October 1957 (aged 26)	9	(Socialist Federal Republic of Yugoslavia) FK Sarajevo
14	DF	Marko Elsner	11 April 1960 (aged 24)	6	(Socialist Federal Republic of Yugoslavia) Red Star Belgrade
15	DF	Branko Miljuš	17 August 1961 (aged 22)	8	(Socialist Federal Republic of Yugoslavia) Hajduk Split
16	MF	Dragan Stojković	3 March 1965 (aged 19)	12	(Socialist Federal Republic of Yugoslavia) Radnički Niš
17	FW	Josip Čop	14 October 1954 (aged 29)	2	(Socialist Federal Republic of Yugoslavia) Hajduk Split
18	FW	Stjepan Deverić	20 August 1961 (aged 22)	9	(Socialist Federal Republic of Yugoslavia) Dinamo Zagreb
19	FW	Sulejman Halilović	14 November 1955 (aged 28)	10	(Socialist Federal Republic of Yugoslavia) Dinamo Vinkovci
20	MF	Borislav Cvetković	30 September 1962 (aged 21)	7	(Socialist Federal Republic of Yugoslavia) Dinamo Zagreb

== Group 2 ==
=== Portugal ===
Manager: Fernando Cabrita

No.	Pos.	Player	Date of birth (age)	Caps	Club
1	GK	Manuel Bento (captain)	25 June 1948 (aged 35)	46	(Portugal) Benfica
2	FW	Nené	20 November 1949 (aged 34)	63	(Portugal) Benfica
3	FW	Rui Jordão	9 August 1952 (aged 31)	33	(Portugal) Sporting CP
4	MF	Fernando Chalana	10 February 1959 (aged 25)	22	(Portugal) Benfica
5	MF	Vermelhinho	9 March 1959 (aged 25)	1	(Portugal) Porto
6	FW	Fernando Gomes	22 November 1956 (aged 27)	25	(Portugal) Porto
7	MF	Carlos Manuel	15 January 1958 (aged 26)	24	(Portugal) Benfica
8	DF	António Veloso	31 January 1957 (aged 27)	4	(Portugal) Benfica
9	DF	João Pinto	21 November 1961 (aged 22)	7	(Portugal) Porto
10	DF	António Lima Pereira	1 February 1952 (aged 32)	10	(Portugal) Porto
11	DF	Eurico	29 September 1955 (aged 28)	27	(Portugal) Porto
12	GK	Jorge Martins	12 August 1954 (aged 29)	0	(Portugal) Vitória de Setúbal
13	MF	António Sousa	28 April 1957 (aged 27)	8	(Portugal) Porto
14	MF	António Frasco	16 January 1955 (aged 29)	9	(Portugal) Porto
15	MF	Jaime Pacheco	22 July 1958 (aged 25)	9	(Portugal) Porto
16	MF	António Bastos Lopes	19 December 1953 (aged 30)	9	(Portugal) Benfica
17	DF	Álvaro	3 January 1961 (aged 23)	5	(Portugal) Benfica
18	DF	Eduardo Luís	6 December 1955 (aged 28)	2	(Portugal) Porto
19	FW	Diamantino	3 August 1959 (aged 24)	5	(Portugal) Benfica
20	GK	Vítor Damas	8 October 1947 (aged 36)	4	(Portugal) Portimonense

=== Romania ===
Manager: Mircea Lucescu

No.	Pos.	Player	Date of birth (age)	Caps	Club
1	GK	Silviu Lung	9 September 1956 (aged 27)	19	(Romania) Universitatea Craiova
2	DF	Mircea Rednic	9 April 1962 (aged 22)	30	(Romania) Dinamo București
3	DF	Costică Ștefănescu (captain)	26 March 1951 (aged 33)	53	(Romania) Universitatea Craiova
4	DF	Nicolae Ungureanu	11 November 1956 (aged 27)	25	(Romania) Universitatea Craiova
5	MF	Aurel Țicleanu	20 January 1959 (aged 25)	38	(Romania) Universitatea Craiova
6	DF	Gino Iorgulescu	15 May 1956 (aged 28)	34	(Romania) Sportul Studențesc
7	FW	Marcel Coraș	14 May 1959 (aged 25)	15	(Romania) Sportul Studențesc
8	DF	Michael Klein	10 October 1959 (aged 24)	32	(Romania) Corvinul Hunedoara
9	FW	Rodion Cămătaru	22 June 1958 (aged 25)	38	(Romania) Universitatea Craiova
10	MF	László Bölöni	11 March 1953 (aged 31)	71	(Romania) ASA Târgu Mureș
11	MF	Gheorghe Hagi	5 February 1965 (aged 19)	11	(Romania) Sportul Studențesc
12	GK	Dumitru Moraru	8 May 1956 (aged 28)	28	(Romania) Dinamo București
13	DF	Ioan Andone	15 March 1960 (aged 24)	22	(Romania) Dinamo București
14	MF	Mircea Irimescu	13 May 1959 (aged 25)	5	(Romania) Universitatea Craiova
15	MF	Marin Dragnea	1 January 1956 (aged 28)	1	(Romania) Dinamo București
16	DF	Nicolae Negrilă	23 July 1954 (aged 29)	19	(Romania) Universitatea Craiova
17	DF	Ion Adrian Zare	11 May 1959 (aged 25)	2	(Romania) Bihor
18	MF	Ionel Augustin	11 October 1955 (aged 28)	30	(Romania) Dinamo București
19	FW	Romulus Gabor	14 October 1961 (aged 22)	28	(Romania) Corvinul Hunedoara
20	GK	Vasile Iordache	9 October 1950 (aged 33)	19	(Romania) Steaua București

=== Spain ===
Manager: Miguel Muñoz

No.	Pos.	Player	Date of birth (age)	Caps	Club
1	GK	Luis Arconada (captain)	26 June 1954 (aged 29)	57	(Spain) Real Sociedad
2	DF	Santiago Urquiaga	18 April 1958 (aged 26)	9	(Spain) Athletic Bilbao
3	DF	José Antonio Camacho	8 June 1955 (aged 29)	48	(Spain) Real Madrid
4	DF	Antonio Maceda	16 May 1957 (aged 27)	18	(Spain) Sporting Gijón
5	DF	Andoni Goikoetxea	23 May 1956 (aged 28)	12	(Spain) Athletic Bilbao
6	DF	Rafael Gordillo	24 February 1957 (aged 27)	49	(Spain) Real Betis
7	MF	Juan Señor	26 August 1958 (aged 25)	15	(Spain) Zaragoza
8	MF	Víctor	15 March 1957 (aged 27)	20	(Spain) Barcelona
9	FW	Santillana	23 August 1952 (aged 31)	48	(Spain) Real Madrid
10	MF	Ricardo Gallego	8 February 1959 (aged 25)	12	(Spain) Real Madrid
11	FW	Lobo Carrasco	6 March 1959 (aged 25)	21	(Spain) Barcelona
12	DF	Salva	4 March 1961 (aged 23)	3	(Spain) Zaragoza
13	GK	Francisco Buyo	13 January 1958 (aged 26)	2	(Spain) Sevilla
14	DF	Julio Alberto	7 October 1958 (aged 25)	5	(Spain) Barcelona
15	MF	Roberto	5 July 1962 (aged 21)	2	(Spain) Valencia
16	MF	Francisco	1 November 1962 (aged 21)	5	(Spain) Sevilla
17	FW	Marcos Alonso	1 October 1959 (aged 24)	19	(Spain) Barcelona
18	FW	Emilio Butragueño	22 July 1963 (aged 20)	0	(Spain) Real Madrid
19	FW	Manuel Sarabia	9 January 1957 (aged 27)	8	(Spain) Athletic Bilbao
20	GK	Andoni Zubizarreta	23 October 1961 (aged 22)	0	(Spain) Athletic Bilbao

=== West Germany ===
Manager: Jupp Derwall

No.	Pos.	Player	Date of birth (age)	Caps	Club
1	GK	Harald Schumacher	6 March 1954 (aged 30)	48	(West Germany) 1. FC Köln
2	DF	Hans-Peter Briegel	11 October 1955 (aged 28)	50	(West Germany) 1. FC Kaiserslautern
3	DF	Gerd Strack	1 September 1955 (aged 28)	10	(West Germany) 1. FC Köln
4	DF	Karlheinz Förster	25 July 1958 (aged 25)	58	(West Germany) VfB Stuttgart
5	DF	Bernd Förster	3 May 1956 (aged 28)	30	(West Germany) VfB Stuttgart
6	MF	Wolfgang Rolff	26 December 1959 (aged 24)	10	(West Germany) Hamburger SV
7	DF	Andreas Brehme	9 November 1960 (aged 23)	5	(West Germany) 1. FC Kaiserslautern
8	FW	Klaus Allofs	5 December 1956 (aged 27)	29	(West Germany) 1. FC Köln
9	FW	Rudi Völler	13 April 1960 (aged 24)	15	(West Germany) Werder Bremen
10	MF	Norbert Meier	20 September 1958 (aged 25)	12	(West Germany) Werder Bremen
11	FW	Karl-Heinz Rummenigge (captain)	25 September 1955 (aged 28)	75	(West Germany) Bayern Munich
12	GK	Dieter Burdenski	26 November 1950 (aged 33)	12	(West Germany) Werder Bremen
13	MF	Lothar Matthäus	21 March 1961 (aged 23)	23	(West Germany) Borussia Mönchengladbach
14	MF	Ralf Falkenmayer	11 February 1963 (aged 21)	0	(West Germany) Eintracht Frankfurt
15	DF	Uli Stielike	15 November 1954 (aged 29)	38	(Spain) Real Madrid
16	MF	Hans-Günter Bruns	15 November 1954 (aged 29)	3	(West Germany) Borussia Mönchengladbach
17	MF	Pierre Littbarski	16 April 1960 (aged 24)	26	(West Germany) 1. FC Köln
18	DF	Guido Buchwald	24 January 1961 (aged 23)	1	(West Germany) VfB Stuttgart
19	MF	Rudi Bommer	19 August 1957 (aged 26)	4	(West Germany) Fortuna Düsseldorf
20	GK	Helmut Roleder	9 October 1953 (aged 30)	1	(West Germany) VfB Stuttgart
