= 1984 Supertaça Cândido de Oliveira =

- Event: Supertaça Cândido de Oliveira (Portuguese Super Cup)
Benfica	Porto
0	4
- Porto won the replay 4–0 on aggregate, after a 1–1 aggregate scoreline over the first two legs.

First leg
Benfica	Porto
1	0
- Date: 27 March 1985
- Venue: Estádio da Luz, Lisbon
- Referee: Carlos Valente (Setúbal)

Second leg
Porto	Benfica
1	0
- Date: 17 April 1985
- Venue: Estádio das Antas, Porto
- Referee: Rosa Santos (Beja)

The 1984 Supertaça Cândido de Oliveira was the 6th edition of the Supertaça Cândido de Oliveira, the annual Portuguese football season-opening match contested by the winners of the previous season's top league and cup competitions (or cup runner-up in case the league- and cup-winning club is the same). The 1984 Supertaça Cândido de Oliveira was contested over two legs, and opposed Benfica and Porto of the Primeira Liga. Benfica qualified for the SuperCup by winning the 1983–84 Primeira Divisão, whilst Porto qualified for the Supertaça by winning the 1983–84 Taça de Portugal.

The first leg which took place at the Estádio da Luz, saw Benfica defeat Porto 1–0. The second leg which took place at the Estádio das Antas, saw Porto emulate the first leg result (1–1 on aggregate), which led to the match being replayed one month later over two legs. In the replay, Porto won both matches over the Águias and thus claimed a third Supertaça.

== First leg ==
=== Details ===
27 March 1985
20:30 WEST

Benfica	1–0	Porto
Manniche 56'

Estádio da Luz, Lisbon
Referee: Carlos Valente (Setúbal)

Benfica	Porto

GK	1	(Portugal) Manuel Bento (c)
DF	(Portugal) Minervino Pietra	(substituted off) 78'
DF	(Portugal) António Bastos Lopes
DF	(Portugal) Álvaro Magalhães
DF	(Portugal) António Oliveira
MF	(Portugal) José Luís
MF	(Portugal) Diamantino Miranda
MF	(Portugal) Carlos Manuel
MF	(Portugal) Adelino Nunes
FW	(Denmark) Michael Manniche
FW	(Portugal) Jorge Silva
Substitutes:
DF	(Portugal) Carlos Pereira	(substituted on) 78'
Manager:
(Hungary) Pál Csernai

GK	1	(Portugal) Zé Beto
DF	(Portugal) João Pinto
DF	(Portugal) Augusto Inácio	(substituted off) 75'
DF	(Portugal) Eurico Gomes
DF	(Portugal) Eduardo Luís
MF	(Portugal) Quinito
MF	(Portugal) Quim
MF	(Portugal) António Frasco	(substituted off) 46'
MF	(Portugal) António André
FW	(Portugal) Fernando Gomes (c)
FW	(Portugal) Paulo Futre	Booked
Substitutes:
MF	(Portugal) Vermelhinho	(substituted on) 46'
FW	(Republic of Ireland) Mickey Walsh	(substituted on) 75'
Manager:
(Portugal) Artur Jorge

Match officials

- Assistant referees:
- Fourth official:

Match rules

- 90 minutes.
- Maximum of two substitutions

== Second leg ==
=== Details ===
17 April 1985
21:30 WEST

Porto	1–0	Benfica
Vermelhinho 87'

Estádio das Antas, Porto
Referee: Rosa Santos (Beja)

Porto	Benfica

GK	1	(Portugal) Zé Beto
DF	(Portugal) Augusto Inácio	(substituted off) 46'
DF	(Portugal) António Lima Pereira	(substituted off) 46'
DF	(Portugal) João Pinto
DF	(Portugal) Eurico Gomes
MF	(Portugal) Quim
MF	(Portugal) António André
MF	(Portugal) Vermelhinho
FW	(Portugal) Paulo Futre
FW	(Portugal) Fernando Gomes (c)
FW	(Portugal) Jaime Magalhães
Substitutes:
DF	(Portugal) Eduardo Luís	(substituted on) 46'
MF	(Portugal) José Semedo	(substituted on) 46'
Manager:
(Portugal) Artur Jorge

GK	1	(Portugal) Manuel Bento (c)
DF	(Portugal) Minervino Pietra
DF	(Portugal) António Bastos Lopes
DF	(Portugal) Álvaro Magalhães
DF	(Portugal) António Oliveira
MF	(Portugal) Diamantino Miranda
MF	(Portugal) José Luís
MF	(Portugal) Carlos Manuel	(yellow card) 74'
MF	(Portugal) Adelino Nunes	(yellow card) 39'
FW	(Denmark) Michael Manniche
FW	(Brazil) Wando	(substituted off) 82'
Substitutes:
MF	(Portugal) Shéu	(substituted on) 82'
Manager:
(Hungary) Pál Csernai

Match officials

- Assistant referees:
- Fourth official:

Match rules

- 90 minutes.
- Maximum of two substitutions

== Replay – First leg ==
=== Details ===
16 May 1985
21:30 WEST

Porto	3–0	Benfica
Vermelhinho 5'; Gomes 37', 88'

Estádio das Antas, Porto
Referee: Raúl Ribeiro (Aveiro)

Porto	Benfica

GK	1	(Portugal) Zé Beto
DF	(Portugal) João Pinto
DF	(Portugal) Augusto Inácio	(substituted off) 82'
DF	(Portugal) António Lima Pereira
DF	(Portugal) Eurico Gomes
MF	(Portugal) Vermelhinho
MF	(Portugal) Jaime Magalhães
MF	(Portugal) António Frasco
MF	(Portugal) Quim
FW	(Portugal) Fernando Gomes (c)
FW	(Portugal) Paulo Futre
Substitutes:
GK	(Portugal) Luís Matos
DF	(Portugal) Eduardo Luís
DF	(Cape Verde) José Mariano
MF	(Portugal) José Semedo	(substituted on) 82'
FW	(Republic of Ireland) Mickey Walsh
Manager:
(Portugal) Artur Jorge

GK	1	(Portugal) Manuel Bento (c)
DF	(Portugal) Minervino Pietra
DF	(Portugal) António Bastos Lopes
DF	(Portugal) Álvaro Magalhães
DF	(Portugal) António Oliveira
MF	(Portugal) José Luís
MF	(Portugal) Diamantino Miranda
MF	(Portugal) Carlos Manuel
MF	(Portugal) Shéu
FW	(Portugal) Tozé Santos	(substituted off) 46'
FW	(Denmark) Michael Manniche
Substitutes:
GK	(Portugal) José Delgado
DF	(Portugal) Samuel Quina
MF	(Brazil) Nivaldo Silva
FW	(Portugal) Jorge Silva	(substituted on) 46'
FW	(Portugal) Nené
Manager:
(Hungary) Pál Csernai

Match officials

- Assistant referees:
- Fourth official:

Match rules

- 90 minutes.
- Maximum of two substitutions

== Replay – Second leg ==
=== Details ===
30 May 1985
21:00 WEST

Benfica	0–1	Porto
		Futre 30'

Estádio da Luz, Lisbon
Referee: Santos Ruivo (Santarém)

Benfica	Porto

GK	1	(Portugal) Manuel Bento (c)
DF	(Portugal) Minervino Pietra
DF	(Portugal) António Bastos Lopes
DF	(Portugal) Álvaro Magalhães
DF	(Portugal) António Oliveira
MF	(Portugal) Adelino Nunes
MF	(Portugal) José Luís
MF	(Portugal) Diamantino Miranda
MF	(Portugal) Carlos Manuel	(substituted off) 63'
FW	(Denmark) Michael Manniche
FW	(Portugal) Nené	(substituted off) 46'
Substitutes:
GK	(Portugal) José Delgado
DF	(Portugal) Samuel Quina
MF	(Portugal) Shéu
FW	(Portugal) Jorge Silva	(substituted off) 46'
FW	(Brazil) Wando	(substituted off) 63'
Manager:
(Hungary) Pál Csernai

GK	1	(Portugal) Zé Beto
DF	(Portugal) João Pinto
DF	(Portugal) Augusto Inácio
DF	(Portugal) Eurico Gomes	(substituted off) 75'
DF	(Portugal) António Lima Pereira
MF	(Portugal) Vermelhinho
MF	(Portugal) António Frasco
MF	(Portugal) Quim
MF	(Portugal) Jaime Magalhães	(substituted off) 52'
FW	(Portugal) Fernando Gomes (c)
FW	(Portugal) Paulo Futre
Substitutes:
DF	(Portugal) Eduardo Luís	(substituted on) 75'
MF	(Portugal) José Semedo	(substituted on) 52'
Manager:
(Portugal) Artur Jorge

Match officials

- Assistant referees:
- Fourth official:

Match rules

- 90 minutes.
- Maximum of two substitutions

1984 Supertaça Cândido de Oliveira Winners
Porto
3rd Title

== See also ==
- O Clássico
- 1984–85 Primeira Divisão
- 1984–85 S.L. Benfica season
