= 1984 Taça de Portugal final =

- Event: 1983–84 Taça de Portugal
| Porto | Rio Ave |
| 4 | 1 |
- Date: 1 May 1984
- Venue: Estádio Nacional, Oeiras
- Referee: Vitor Correia (Lisbon)

The 1984 Taça de Portugal final was the final match of the 1983–84 Taça de Portugal, the 44th season of the Taça de Portugal, the premier Portuguese football cup competition organized by the Portuguese Football Federation (FPF). The match was played on 1 May 1984 at the Estádio Nacional in Oeiras, and opposed two Primeira Liga sides: Porto and Rio Ave. Porto defeated Rio Ave 4–1 to claim the Taça de Portugal for a fifth time.

In Portugal, the final was televised live on RTP. As a result of Porto winning the Taça de Portugal, the Dragões qualified for the 1984 Supertaça Cândido de Oliveira where they took on 1983–84 Primeira Divisão winners Benfica.

== Match ==
=== Details ===
1 May 1984

| Porto | 4–1 | Rio Ave |
|---|---|---|
| Sousa 16', 52'; Gomes 28'; Vermelhinho 38' | | N'Habola 89' |

Estádio Nacional, Oeiras
Referee: Vitor Correia (Lisbon)

| Porto | Rio Ave |

GK | 1 | (Portugal) Zé Beto
DF | (Portugal) João Pinto
DF | (Portugal) Eurico Gomes
DF | (Portugal) António Lima Pereira
DF | (Portugal) Eduardo Luís
MF | (Portugal) António Sousa
MF | (Portugal) António Frasco
MF | (Portugal) Jaime Pacheco
MF | (Portugal) Jaime Magalhães
MF | (Portugal) Vermelhinho
FW | (Portugal) Fernando Gomes (c)
Substitutes:
GK | (Portugal) António Barradas
MF | (Portugal) Joaquim Quinito
Manager:
(Portugal) António Morais

(substituted off) 74'
(substituted off) 46'
(substituted on) 74'
(substituted on) 46'

GK | 1 | (Portugal) Alfredo Castro
DF | (Portugal) Duarte Sá (c)
DF | (Portugal) Antero Duarte
DF | (Portugal) Luís Sérgio
DF | (Brazil) Baltemar Brito
MF | (Portugal) Cabumba | (substituted off) 29'
MF | (Portugal) Adérito Pires
MF | (Portugal) Rui Casaca
MF | (Portugal) Jorge Carvalho
MF | (Portugal) Carlos Manuel
FW | (Portugal) Manuel Pires | (substituted off) 65'
Substitutes:
MF | (Portugal) Mário Pinto | (substituted on) 65'
FW | (Portugal) N'Habola | (substituted on) 29'
Manager:
(Portugal) José Mourinho Félix

1983–84 Taça de Portugal Winners
Porto
5th Title

Match officials

- Assistant referees:
- Fourth official:

Match rules

- 90 minutes.
- 30 minutes of extra time if necessary.
- Maximum of two substitutions
