= 1984 European Cup Winners' Cup final =

- Match programme cover
- Event: 1983–84 European Cup Winners' Cup
Juventus	Porto
(Italy)	(Portugal)
2	1
- Date: 16 May 1984
- Venue: St. Jakob Stadium, Basel
- Referee: Adolf Prokop (East Germany)
- Attendance: 60,000

The 1984 European Cup Winners' Cup Final was a football match contested between Juventus of Italy and Porto of Portugal. It was the final match of the 1983–84 European Cup Winners' Cup and the 24th European Cup Winners' Cup final. It was held at St. Jakob Stadium in Basel, Switzerland.

Juventus won the match 2–1 due to goals by Beniamino Vignola and Zbigniew Boniek. It was the fourth year in succession the final had been settled by a 2–1 scoreline.

== Route to the final ==
(Italy) Juventus					(Portugal) Porto			
Opponent	Agg.	1st leg	2nd leg		Opponent	Agg.	1st leg	2nd leg
(Poland) Lechia Gdańsk	10–2	7–0 (H)	3–2 (A)	First round	(Socialist Federal Republic of Yugoslavia) Dinamo Zagreb	2–2 (a)	1–2 (A)	1–0 (H)
(France) Paris Saint-Germain	2–2 (a)	2–2 (A)	0–0 (H)	Second round	(Scotland) Rangers	2–2 (a)	1–2 (A)	1–0 (H)
(Finland) Haka	2–0	1–0 (A)	1–0 (H)	Quarter-finals	(Soviet Union) Shakhtar Donetsk	4–3	3–2 (H)	1–1 (A)
(England) Manchester United	3–2	1–1 (A)	2–1 (H)	Semi-finals	(Scotland) Aberdeen	2–0	1–0 (H)	1–0 (A)

== Match ==
=== Details ===
16 May 1984
20:15 CEST

Juventus (Italy)	2–1	(Portugal) Porto
Vignola 12'; Boniek 41'	Report	Sousa 29'

St. Jakob Stadium, Basel
Attendance: 60,000
Referee: Adolf Prokop (East Germany)

Juventus	Porto

GK	1	(Italy) Stefano Tacconi
RB	2	(Italy) Claudio Gentile
LB	3	(Italy) Antonio Cabrini
DM	4	(Italy) Massimo Bonini
CB	5	(Italy) Sergio Brio
SW	6	(Italy) Gaetano Scirea (c)
LM	7	(Italy) Beniamino Vignola		(substituted off) 89'
RM	8	(Italy) Marco Tardelli
CF	9	(Italy) Paolo Rossi
AM	10	(France) Michel Platini	(yellow card) 88'
SS	11	(Poland) Zbigniew Boniek
Substitutes:
SW	13	(Italy) Nicola Caricola		(substituted on) 89'
Manager:
(Italy) Giovanni Trapattoni

GK	1	(Portugal) Zé Beto
RB	2	(Portugal) João Pinto
LB	3	(Portugal) Eduardo Luís	(yellow card) 58'	(substituted off) 82'
CB	4	(Portugal) Lima Pereira	(yellow card) 81'
CB	5	(Portugal) Eurico Gomes
RW	6	(Portugal) Jaime Magalhães		(substituted off) 64'
CM	7	(Portugal) António Frasco
CM	8	(Portugal) António Sousa
CF	9	(Portugal) Fernando Gomes (c)
DM	10	(Portugal) Jaime Pacheco
LW	11	(Portugal) Vermelhinho
Substitutes:
FW	15	(Republic of Ireland) Mickey Walsh		(substituted on) 64'
MF	16	(Portugal) José Costa		(substituted on) 82'
Manager:
(Portugal) António Morais

Assistant referees:
Siegfried Kirschen (East Germany)
Klaus Peschel (East Germany)

Match rules

- 90 minutes
- 30 minutes of extra time if necessary
- Penalty shoot-out if scores still level
- Five named substitutes
- Maximum of two substitutions

== See also ==
- 1983–84 European Cup Winners' Cup
- 1984 European Cup Final
- 1984 UEFA Cup Final
- 1984 European Super Cup
- Blocco-Juve
- Juventus F.C. in international football
- FC Porto in international football
