= 1983 Supertaça Cândido de Oliveira =

- Event: Supertaça Cândido de Oliveira (Portuguese Super Cup)
Porto	Benfica
2	1

First leg
Porto	Benfica
0	0
- Date: 8 December 1983
- Venue: Estádio das Antas, Porto
- Referee: Ezequiel Feijão (Setúbal)

Second leg
Benfica	Porto
1	2
- Date: 14 December 1983
- Venue: Estádio da Luz, Lisbon
- Referee: Veiga Trigo (Beja)

The 1983 Supertaça Cândido de Oliveira was the 5th edition of the Supertaça Cândido de Oliveira, the annual Portuguese football season-opening match contested by the winners of the previous season's top league and cup competitions (or cup runner-up in case the league- and cup-winning club is the same). The 1983 Supertaça Cândido de Oliveira was contested over two legs, and opposed Benfica and Porto of the Primeira Liga. Benfica qualified for the SuperCup by winning both the 1982–83 Primeira Divisão and the 1982–83 Taça de Portugal, whilst Porto qualified for the Supertaça as the cup runner-up.

The first leg which took place at the Estádio das Antas, saw a goalless draw. The second leg which took place at the Estádio da Luz saw Porto defeat Benfica 2–1 (2–1 on aggregate), which granted the Dragões a second Supertaça.

== First leg ==
=== Details ===
8 December 1983

Porto	0–0	Benfica

Estádio das Antas, Porto
Referee: Ezequiel Feijão (Setúbal)

Porto	Benfica

GK	1	(Portugal) Zé Beto
DF	(Portugal) António Lima Pereira (c)
DF	(Portugal) Eduardo Luís
DF	(Portugal) João Pinto
DF	(Portugal) Eurico Gomes	(substituted off) 55'
MF	(Portugal) António Frasco
MF	(Portugal) António Sousa
MF	(Portugal) Jaime Pacheco
MF	(Portugal) Vermelhinho
MF	(Portugal) Jaime Magalhães	(substituted off) 75'
FW	(Portugal) Jacques Pereira
Substitutes:
DF	(Portugal) Teixeirinha	(substituted on) 55'
MF	(Guinea-Bissau) Bobó	(substituted on) 75'
Manager:
(Portugal) António Morais

GK	1	(Portugal) Manuel Bento (c)
DF	(Portugal) Minervino Pietra
DF	(Portugal) António Bastos Lopes
DF	(Portugal) Álvaro Magalhães
DF	(Portugal) António Oliveira
MF	(Portugal) Shéu
MF	(Portugal) José Luís
MF	(Portugal) Carlos Manuel
FW	(Portugal) Nené	(substituted off) 73'
FW	(Portugal) Fernando Chalana
FW	(Socialist Federal Republic of Yugoslavia) Zoran Filipović	(substituted off) 62'
Substitutes:
MF	(Portugal) Diamantino Miranda	(substituted on) 62'
MF	(Sweden) Glenn Strömberg	(substituted on) 73'
Manager:
(Sweden) Sven-Göran Eriksson

Match officials

- Assistant referees:
- Fourth official:

Match rules

- 90 minutes.
- Maximum of two substitutions

== Second leg ==
=== Details ===
14 December 1983

Benfica	1–2	Porto
Manniche 12'		Frasco 20'; Vermelhinho 64'

Estádio da Luz, Lisbon
Referee: Veiga Trigo (Beja)

Benfica	Porto

GK	1	(Portugal) Manuel Bento (c)	Booked
DF	(Portugal) Minervino Pietra
DF	(Portugal) António Bastos Lopes
DF	(Portugal) Álvaro Magalhães	Booked
DF	(Portugal) António Oliveira	(substituted off) 70'
MF	(Portugal) Fernando Chalana
MF	(Portugal) Diamantino Miranda	Booked	(substituted off) 65'
MF	(Sweden) Glenn Strömberg
MF	(Portugal) Carlos Manuel	Booked
FW	(Portugal) José Luís
FW	(Denmark) Michael Manniche
Substitutes:
GK	(Portugal) José Delgado
DF	(Portugal) Alberto Bastos Lopes
DF	(Portugal) Samuel Quina
FW	(Portugal) Shéu	(substituted off) 70'
FW	(Portugal) Nené	(substituted off) 65'
Manager:
(Sweden) Sven-Göran Eriksson

GK	1	(Portugal) Zé Beto
DF	(Portugal) João Pinto
DF	(Portugal) Eurico Gomes
DF	(Portugal) António Lima Pereira (c)
DF	(Portugal) Eduardo Luís
MF	(Portugal) Vermelhinho
MF	(Portugal) António Sousa
MF	(Portugal) António Frasco	Booked	(substituted off) 46'
MF	(Portugal) Jaime Pacheco	Booked
MF	(Portugal) Jaime Magalhães	(substituted off) 37'
FW	(Portugal) Jacques Pereira
Substitutes:
MF	(Portugal) José Semedo	(substituted on) 37'
MF	(Portugal) Quinito	(substituted on) 46'
Manager:
(Portugal) António Morais

Match officials

- Assistant referees:
- Fourth official:

Match rules

- 90 minutes.
- Maximum of two substitutions

1983 Supertaça Cândido de Oliveira Winners
Porto
2nd Title

== See also ==
- O Clássico
- 1983–84 Primeira Divisão
- 1983–84 S.L. Benfica season
