= José Costa (footballer, born 1953) =

Portuguese footballer

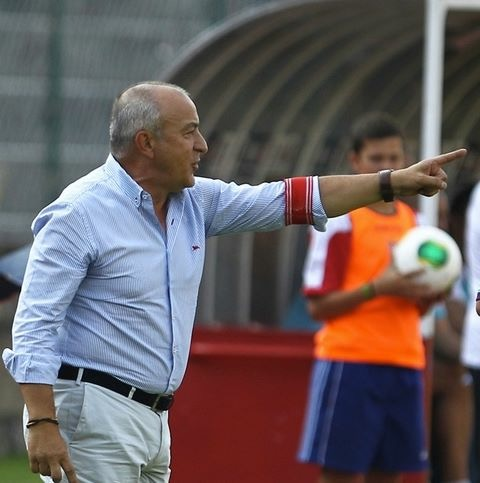
- Costa coaching Braga B

Personal information
- Full name: José Alberto Barroso Machado e Costa
- Date of birth: 31 October 1953 (age 72)
- Place of birth: Porto, Portugal
- Height: 1.73 m (5 ft 8 in)
- Position: Winger

Youth career
- 1969–1971: Vila Real
- 1971–1972: Académica

Senior career*
Years	Team	Apps	(Gls)
1971–1978	Académica	136	(15)
1977	→ Rochester Lancers (loan)	8	(1)
1978–1985	Porto	145	(22)
1985–1986	Vitória Guimarães	29	(2)
1986–1987	Marítimo	9	(0)
Total		327	(40)

International career
1978–1983	Portugal	24	(1)

Managerial career
- 1989: Portugal (assistant)
- 1989–1990: Académica
- 1991–1992: Portugal (assistant)
- 1991–1992: Portugal U21
- 1993–1995: Sporting CP (assistant)
- 1996–1997: Nagoya Grampus Eight (assistant)
- 1996: Nagoya Grampus Eight
- 1998–1999: United Arab Emirates (assistant)
- 1999–2001: Famalicão
- 2001: Vizela
- 2001–2003: Varzim
- 2003: Chaves
- 2009–2010: Portugal (assistant)
- 2011–2012: Sanat Naft
- 2013–2014: Braga B
- * Club domestic league appearances and goals

José Alberto Barroso Machado e Costa (born 31 October 1953) is a Portuguese retired footballer who played as a left winger, and is a manager.

In 15 Primeira Liga seasons – 16 as a professional in total – he amassed totals of 301 matches and 37 goals in representation of four teams, mostly Porto. Subsequently, he embarked in a lengthy managerial career.

== Playing career ==
=== Club ===
Costa was born in Porto. Still as a junior, he made his professional – and Primeira Liga – debut with Académica de Coimbra, playing 12 first-team games in an eventual relegation and contributing with 18 and two goals in an immediate promotion back; he spent a portion of the summer of 1977 on loan with the Rochester Lancers of the North American Soccer League.

After scoring a career-best ten goals in the 1977–78 season with the Students, Costa signed for FC Porto. A classic winger with an above-average physical condition – he practiced track and field and handball in his first club, S.C. Vila Real– he went on to form a formidable attacking trio in the club with Fernando Gomes and António Oliveira, being instrumental in the conquest of six major titles, including two national championships; he was voted the Portuguese Footballer of The Year in 1979, and also appeared as a substitute in the final of the 1983–84 UEFA Cup Winners' Cup, lost against Juventus FC in Basel.

The name of Costa was connected to the Verão Quente ("Hot summer") of 1980, when a group of 15 players, including António Lima Pereira, Oliveira, Octávio Machado, Jaime Pacheco, António Sousa and Gomes, suspended their club activity sympathizing with manager José Maria Pedroto and director of football Jorge Nuno Pinto da Costa, who had entered in "collision course" with chairman Américo de Sá. He still remained with the five a further five years but, after the consecutive emergence of Vermelhinho and 17-year-old Paulo Futre, he lost his importance in the team, for example appearing in only five matches in the 1984–85 campaign.

Aged nearly 32, Costa joined Vitória Sport Clube, helping the Guimarães-based side finish fourth and qualify to the UEFA Cup. On 24 November 1985 he scored his only goal of the season by helping defeat Sporting CP 4–3 at home, and retired from the game in June 1987 after a slow year with C.S. Marítimo.

=== International ===
Costa won 24 caps for Portugal and scored one goal, against the United States in his second international match. His debut came on 8 March 1978 in a friendly match with France in Paris, while he was still a member of Académica.

Costa did not represent the nation at any international competition, and his last appearance was on 28 October 1983 against Poland, in a 1–0 away win for the UEFA Euro 1984 qualifiers.

José Alberto Costa: International goals
No.	Date	Venue	Opponent	Score	Result	Competition
1	20 September 1978	Estádio do Bonfim, Setúbal, Portugal	United States	1–0	1–0	Friendly

== Coaching career ==
After retiring as a professional footballer Costa, who possessed a solid academic education (he completed a degree in mechanical engineering at the University of Coimbra), embarked on a coaching career. He briefly acted as assistant to Juca in the national team, then took charge of its youth sides and also assisted the following national team manager, Carlos Queiroz. His first head coach experience was with former team Académica in the second division, remaining one season with the club.

Costa again worked with Queiroz at Sporting, NY/NJ MetroStars, Nagoya Grampus Eight and the United Arab Emirates national team. In the late 1990s he returned to head coaching duties, consecutively managing F.C. Famalicão (second level), F.C. Vizela (third), Varzim SC (first) and G.D. Chaves (second).

In 2005, Costa was hired to work in the United States for the "USA Seventeen Soccer Academy", as a technical director. He established himself in Santa Clara, California, assisting and technically supervising the various echelons of the academy. In July 2008, he was reunited with Queiroz as he joined the scouting department of the Portugal national team, working alongside Oceano da Cruz and English Julian Ward.

In November 2011, Costa was appointed as head coach of Iran Pro League side Sanat Naft Abadan F.C. until the end of the season, replacing Gholam Hossein Peyrovani. In May 2012, after producing good results, his contract was extended for another year, but he eventually stepped down from his position late into that year.

== Honours ==
=== Porto ===
- Primeira Liga: 1978–79, 1984–85
- Taça de Portugal: 1983–84
- Supertaça Cândido de Oliveira: 1981, 1983, 1984
- UEFA Cup Winners' Cup: Runner-up 1983–84

=== Individual ===
- Portuguese Footballer of the Year: 1979

== Managerial statistics ==
Team	From	To	Record				
Team	From	To	G	W	D	L	Win %
Nagoya Grampus Eight	1996	1996	3	3	0	0	100.00
Total			3	3	0	0	100.00
