= 1987 European Super Cup =

| Ajax | Porto |
| (Netherlands) | (Portugal) |
| 0 | 2 |

First leg
| Ajax | Porto |
| 0 | 1 |
- Date: 21 November 1987
- Venue: Olympic Stadium, Amsterdam
- Referee: Bob Valentine (Scotland)
- Attendance: 27,000

Second leg
| Porto | Ajax |
| 1 | 0 |
- Date: 13 January 1988
- Venue: Estádio das Antas, Porto
- Referee: Aron Schmidhuber (West Germany)
- Attendance: 50,000

The 1987 European Super Cup was played between Porto, winners of the 1986–87 European Cup, and Ajax winners of the 1986–87 European Cup Winners' Cup, with Porto winning 2–0.

== Match details ==
=== First leg ===
21 November 1987

| Ajax (Netherlands) | 0–1 | (Portugal) Porto |
|---|---|---|
| | Report | Barros 5' |

Olympic Stadium, Amsterdam
Attendance: 27,000
Referee: Bob Valentine (Scotland)

| Ajax | Porto |

Ajax:
| GK | (Netherlands) Stanley Menzo |
| RB | (Netherlands) Frank Verlaat |
| CB | (Netherlands) Danny Blind |
| LB | (Netherlands) Aron Winter | (substituted off) 68' |
| RM | (Netherlands) Rob Witschge |
| CM | (Netherlands) John van 't Schip |
| CM | (Netherlands) Jan Wouters |
| CM | (Netherlands) Arnold Mühren (c) | (substituted off) 46' |
| LM | (Scotland) Ally Dick |
| CF | (Netherlands) Dennis Bergkamp |
| CF | (Netherlands) John Bosman |
Subtitutes:
| MF | (Netherlands) Richard Witschge | (substituted on) 46' |
| MF | (Netherlands) Ronald de Boer | (substituted on) 68' |
Manager:
(Netherlands) Johan Cruijff

FC Porto:
| GK | (Poland) Józef Młynarczyk |
| RB | (Portugal) João Pinto (c) |
| CB | (Portugal) Augusto Inácio |
| CB | (Brazil) Geraldão |
| LB | (Portugal) António Lima Pereira |
| RM | (Portugal) António André |
| CM | (Portugal) António Frasco | (substituted off) 84' |
| CM | (Portugal) Jaime Magalhães |
| LM | (Portugal) António Sousa |
| CF | (Portugal) Rui Barros |
| CF | (Portugal) Fernando Gomes |
Substitutes:
| MF | (Portugal) Quim | (substituted on) 84' |
Manager:
(Socialist Federal Republic of Yugoslavia) Tomislav Ivić

=== Second leg ===
13 January 1988

| Porto (Portugal) | 1–0 | (Netherlands) Ajax |
|---|---|---|
| Sousa 70' | Report |

Estádio das Antas, Porto
Attendance: 50,000
Referee: Aron Schmidhuber (West Germany)

| Porto | Ajax |

FC Porto:
| GK | (Poland) Józef Młynarczyk |
| RB | (Portugal) João Pinto (c) |
| CB | (Portugal) Augusto Inácio |
| CB | (Brazil) Geraldão |
| LB | (Portugal) António Lima Pereira |
| RM | (Portugal) António André |
| CM | (Portugal) António Frasco | (substituted off) 84' |
| CM | (Portugal) Jaime Magalhães |
| LM | (Portugal) António Sousa |
| CF | (Portugal) Rui Barros |
| CF | (Portugal) Fernando Gomes |
Substitutes:
| MF | (Portugal) José Semedo | (substituted on) 83' |
| FW | (Portugal) Jorge Plácido | (substituted on) 89' |
Manager:
(Socialist Federal Republic of Yugoslavia) Tomislav Ivić

| GK | (Netherlands) Stanley Menzo |
| RB | (Netherlands) Frank Verlaat |
| CB | (Netherlands) Danny Blind |
| LB | (Netherlands) Aron Winter | (substituted off) 68' |
| RM | (Netherlands) Rob Witschge |
| CM | (Netherlands) John van 't Schip |
| CM | (Netherlands) Jan Wouters |
| CM | (Netherlands) Arnold Mühren (c) | (substituted off) 46' |
| LM | (Scotland) Ally Dick |
| CF | (Netherlands) Dennis Bergkamp |
| CF | (Netherlands) John Bosman |
Subtitutes:
| FW | (Netherlands) Bryan Roy | (substituted on) 64' |
| FW | (Netherlands) Henny Meijer | (substituted on) 81' |
Manager:
(Netherlands) Johan Cruijff

== See also ==
- 1987–88 European Cup
- 1987–88 European Cup Winners' Cup
- AFC Ajax in international football
- FC Porto in international football
