= Tiago Lima Pereira =

Portuguese footballer (born 1994)

Personal information
- Full name: Tiago Miguel Silva Vilela Lima Pereira
- Date of birth: 3 June 1994 (age 32)
- Place of birth: Póvoa de Varzim, Portugal
- Height: 1.90 m (6 ft 3 in)
- Position: Centre-back

Youth career
- 2004–2008: Felgueiras
- 2008–2013: Porto
- 2009–2010: → Padroense (loan)

Senior career*
Years	Team	Apps	(Gls)
2012	Porto B	0	(0)
2013–2016	Vitória Guimarães B	70	(4)
2016–2017	Varzim	14	(0)
2017–2020	Cova Piedade	29	(1)
2019	→ Eastern (loan)	6	(1)
2020–2021	Fafe	7	(0)
2021	Felgueiras 1932	0	(0)
2022	Espinho	9	(0)
2022−2025	Pevidém	59	(5)
Total		194	(11)

International career
2009–2010	Portugal U16	8	(2)
2010–2011	Portugal U17	12	(1)
2011	Portugal U18	4	(0)
2012	Portugal U19	1	(0)
- * Club domestic league appearances and goals

Tiago Miguel Silva Vilela Lima Pereira (born 3 June 1994) is a Portuguese former professional footballer who played as a central defender.

== Club career ==
Born in Póvoa de Varzim, Lima Pereira's final youth club was FC Porto, and he was an unused substitute for the reserves in Segunda Liga for two matches in the middle of the 2012–13 season. He then joined another second team, Vitória S.C. B in the third division, winning promotion in his first year.

Lima Pereira made his division two debut on 9 August 2014, scoring the first goal in a 3–0 home win against C.D. Feirense. He added a further two during the campaign, in a ninth-place finish.

For 2016–17, Lima Pereira signed a one-year contract with Varzim S.C. in the same league. His uncle António had previously played for his hometown side.

Lima Pereira left his native Norte region for the first time on 23 June 2017, agreeing to a three-year deal at second-tier C.D. Cova da Piedade. He went further afield in January 2019, when he joined Eastern Sports Club of the Hong Kong Premier League on a six-month loan.

After leaving Cova da Piedade in 2020, Lima Pereira played at a lower level for AD Fafe, F.C. Felgueiras 1932 and S.C. Espinho.

== Personal life ==
Lima Pereira's uncle, António, also played for Varzim and was a mainstay at Porto in the 1980s.
