= Geraldão (footballer, born 1963) =

Brazilian footballer (born 1963)

Personal information
- Full name: Geraldo Dutra Pereira
- Date of birth: 24 April 1963 (age 63)
- Place of birth: Governador Valadares, Minas Gerais, Brazil
- Height: 1.94 m (6 ft 4 in)
- Position: Centre-back

Youth career
- –1981: Social

Senior career*
Years	Team	Apps	(Gls)
1981	Social		
1982	Cruzeiro		
1982–1983	Al-Arabi		
1984–1987	Cruzeiro		
1987–1991	Porto	101	(20)
1991–1992	Paris Saint-Germain	28	(1)
1992–1993	América		
1993	Grêmio	0	(0)
1993	Portuguesa	11	(1)

International career
1987	Brazil	8	(0)

Managerial career
- 1997: Ipatinga
- 2005: CRB
- 2008: Democrata-GV
- * Club domestic league appearances and goals

Geraldo Dutra Pereira (born 24 April 1963), commonly known as Geraldão, is a Brazilian former professional footballer who played as a centre-back. He was best known for his time at Cruzeiro and Porto.

== Honours ==
=== Porto ===
- Primeira Divisão: 1987–88, 1989–90
- Intercontinental Cup: 1987
- European Super Cup: 1987
