= 1988 Taça de Portugal final =

- Event: 1987–88 Taça de Portugal
Porto	Vitória de Guimarães
1	0
- Date: 19 June 1988
- Venue: Estádio Nacional, Oeiras
- Referee: Vitor Correia (Lisbon)

The 1988 Taça de Portugal final was the final match of the 1987–88 Taça de Portugal, the 48th season of the Taça de Portugal, the premier Portuguese football cup competition organized by the Portuguese Football Federation (FPF). The match was played on 19 June 1988 at the Estádio Nacional in Oeiras, and opposed two Primeira Liga sides: Porto and Vitória de Guimarães. Porto defeated Vitória de Guimarães 1–0 to claim the Taça de Portugal for a sixth time.

In Portugal, the final was televised live on RTP. As Porto claimed both league and cup double in the same season, cup runners-up Vitória de Guimarães faced their cup final opponents in the 1988 Supertaça Cândido de Oliveira.

== Match ==
=== Details ===
19 June 1988

Porto	1–0	Vitória de Guimarães
Magalhães 82'

Estádio Nacional, Oeiras
Referee: Vitor Correia (Lisbon)

Porto	Vitória de Guimarães

GK	1	(Poland) Józef Młynarczyk
RB	2	(Portugal) João Pinto
CB		(Portugal) António Lima Pereira (c)
CB	6	(Portugal) Fernando Bandeirinha
CB		(Brazil) Celso
LB		(Portugal) Augusto Inácio
MF	9	(Portugal) Rui Barros
MF		(Portugal) António André
MF		(Portugal) António Sousa	(substituted off) 46'
MF		(Portugal) Jaime Pacheco
MF	7	(Portugal) Jaime Magalhães
Substitutes:
FW	16	(Portugal) Jorge Plácido	(substituted on) 46'
Manager:
(Socialist Federal Republic of Yugoslavia) Tomislav Ivić

GK	1	(Portugal) António Jesus Pereira (c)
RB		(Portugal) Costeado
CB		(Brazil) Bené
CB		(Brazil) Nenê
LB	3	(Portugal) Basílio Marques	(substituted off) 85'
MF	7	(Portugal) António Carvalho
MF	10	(Portugal) Adão
MF	8	(Zaire) N'Dinga Mbote
MF		(Portugal) Nascimento
FW		(Portugal) Tozé	(substituted off) 60'
FW	9	(Zaire) Monduone N'Kama
Substitutes:
MF		(Brazil) Caio Júnior	(substituted on) 85'
FW		(Brazil) Décio Antônio	(substituted on) 60'
Manager:
(Portugal) José Alberto Torres

1987–88 Taça de Portugal Winners
Porto
6th Title

Match officials

- Assistant referees:
- Fourth official:

Match rules

- 90 minutes.
- 30 minutes of extra time if necessary.
- Maximum of two substitutions
