= Glenn Strömberg =

Swedish footballer

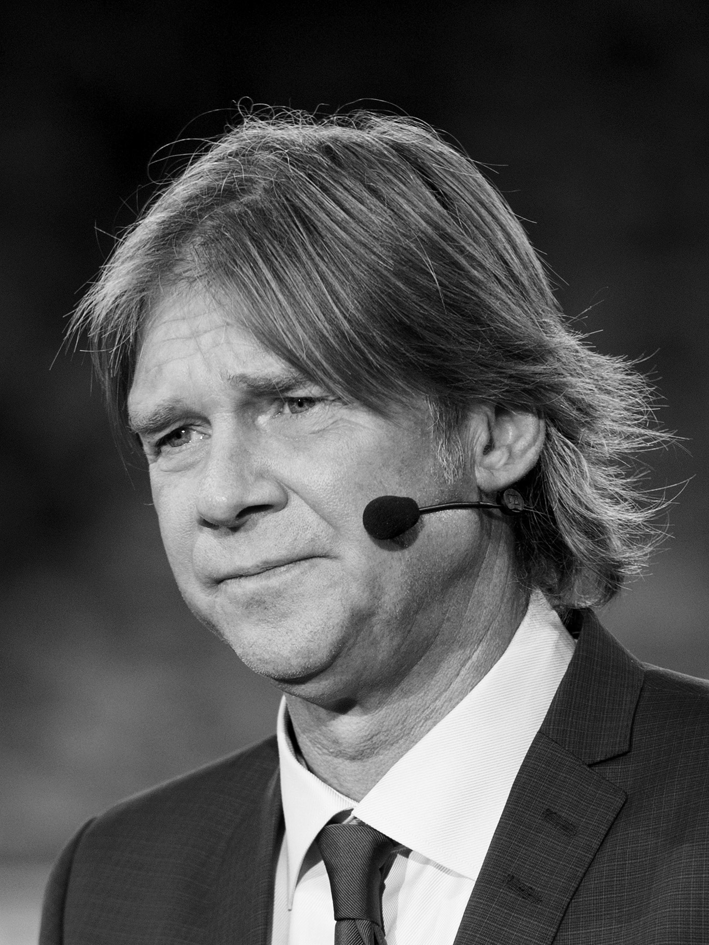
- Strömberg in 2013

Personal information
- Full name: Glenn Peter Strömberg
- Date of birth: 5 January 1960 (age 66)
- Place of birth: Gothenburg, Sweden
- Height: 1.90 m (6 ft 3 in)
- Position: Midfielder

Youth career
- Lerkils IF

Senior career*
Years	Team	Apps	(Gls)
1979–1982	IFK Göteborg	91	(7)
1983–1984	Benfica	32	(10)
1984–1992	Atalanta	219	(18)
Total		342	(35)

International career
1979–1981	Sweden U21	9	(0)
1982–1990	Sweden	52	(7)
- * Club domestic league appearances and goals

Glenn Peter Strömberg (pronounced [ˈɡlɛnː ˈstrœ̂mːbærj]; born 5 January 1960) is a Swedish former professional footballer who played as a midfielder. Starting his career in 1979 with IFK Göteborg, he helped the club win the 1981–82 UEFA Cup before signing with Benfica in 1983. In 1984, he joined the Serie A club Atalanta for which he served as the team captain for four seasons until his retirement in 1992. A full international between 1982 and 1990, he won 52 caps and scored 7 goals for the Sweden national team, and represented his country at the 1990 FIFA World Cup. He was awarded Guldbollen in 1985 as Sweden's best footballer of the year.

== Club career ==
=== IFK Göteborg ===
Strömberg was a part of IFK Göteborg's youth teams before making his senior debut for "Änglarna" on 16 April 1979 in an Allsvenskan game against Kalmar FF that ended 4–0. He helped the team win the 1981–82 UEFA Cup, the 1982 Allsvenskan, as well as three Svenska Cupen titles between 1979 and 1983. During Strömberg's four seasons at Göteborg, he played in 203 games (including friendlies) and scored 33 goals.

=== Benfica ===
Strömberg signed with Benfica after the 1982 Allsvenskan season, reuniting with his former IFK Göteborg manager Sven-Göran Eriksson. During only one and a half seasons at Benfica, Strömberg helped the team win two straight Portuguese league championships.

=== Atalanta ===
After scoring three goals for Sweden against Italy during the UEFA Euro 1984 qualifying stage against Italy, Strömberg managed to land a contract in Serie A with Atalanta. While at Atalanta, he was voted Swedish footballer of the year, winning the 1985 Guldbollen.

== International career ==
Strömberg appeared 9 times for the Sweden U21 team between 1979 and 1981. He made his senior international debut for Sweden on 3 June 1982 in a friendly 1-1 draw with the Soviet Union, playing for 68 minutes before being replaced by Karl Gunnar Björklund. Strömberg scored his first international goal on 29 May 1983 in a UEFA Euro 1984 qualifying game against Italy which Sweden won 2–0. A few months later, Strömberg scored two goals as Sweden beat Italy 3–0 away in the same qualifying campaign. Despite the two victories against Italy, Sweden failed to qualify for UEFA Euro 1984.

Strömberg was a part of the Sweden team that qualified for the 1990 FIFA World Cup, and scored a goal against Scotland as Sweden was eliminated in the group stage after three straight losses. Strömberg's last international appearance came in the last group stage game against Costa Rica on 20 June 1990.

== Playing style ==
For his majestic way of playing in the midfield Strömberg was nicknamed "The Marathon Man". His usual position was central midfield or defensive midfield.

== Personal life ==
Strömberg works as an expert commentator for Sveriges Television, for Viasat on UEFA Champions League and F.A. Premier League matches and for sports betting site Expekt.com as an expert. In June 2012, Glenn Strömberg launched his own football site, Gurufans.com, in Swedish and English.

Since he has no managerial experience, he was never regarded as a serious candidate to succeed Lars Lagerbäck as head coach of the Sweden men's national football team. In interviews during the 2006 FIFA World Cup he said that he was flattered to get mentioned as a potential candidate for the job and that he would think carefully about any offer from the Swedish Football Association.

== Career statistics ==
Appearances and goals by national team and year

National team	Year	Apps	Goals
Sweden	1982	4	0
Sweden	1983	6	3
Sweden	1984	6	0
Sweden	1985	7	1
Sweden	1986	6	1
Sweden	1987	8	0
Sweden	1988	7	1
Sweden	1989	3	0
Sweden	1990	5	1
Total		52	7

International goals

#	Date	Venue	Opponent	Score	Result	Competition	Ref.
1.	29 May 1983	Ullevi, Gothenburg, Sweden	Italy	2–0	2–0	UEFA Euro 1984 qualifying	
2.	15 October 1983	Stadio San Paolo, Naples, Italy	Italy	1–0	3–0	UEFA Euro 1984 qualifying	
3.	15 October 1983	Stadio San Paolo, Naples, Italy	Italy	2–0	3–0	UEFA Euro 1984 qualifying	
4.	17 November 1985	Ta' Qali Stadium, Ta' Qali, Malta	Malta	2–1	2–1	1986 FIFA World Cup qualifying	
5.	12 October 1986	Estadio Nacional, Lisbon, Portugal	Portugal	1–0	1–1	UEFA Euro 1988 qualifying	
6.	27 April 1988	Råsunda Stadium, Solna, Sweden	Wales	2–0	4–1	Friendly	
7.	16 June 1990	Stadio Luigi Ferraris, Genoa, Italy	Scotland	1–2	1–2	1990 FIFA World Cup	

== Honours ==
IFK Göteborg

- UEFA Cup: 1981–82
- Allsvenskan: 1982
- Svenska Cupen: 1978–79, 1981–82

Benfica

- Primeira Liga: 1982–83, 1983–84
- Supertaça Cândido de Oliveira runner-up: 1983
- Iberian Cup: 1983

Atalanta

- Coppa Italia runner-up: 1986–87

Individual

- Guldbollen: 1985

Orders

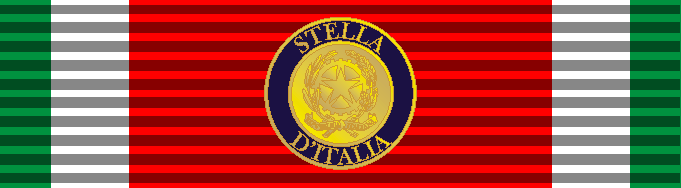
- Officer of the Order of the Star of Italy (2 May 2012)
