= João Pinto (footballer, born 1961) =

Portuguese footballer and manager

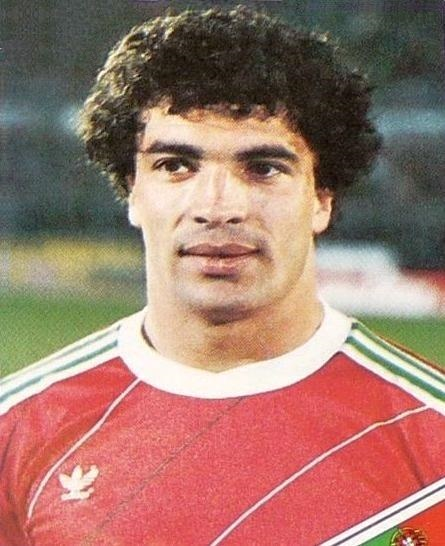
- Pinto with Portugal in the 80s

Personal information
- Full name: João Domingos da Silva Pinto
- Date of birth: 21 November 1961 (age 64)
- Place of birth: Oliveira do Douro, Portugal
- Height: 1.73 m (5 ft 8 in)
- Position: Right-back

Youth career
- 1974–1976: Oliveira Douro
- 1976–1981: Porto

Senior career*
Years	Team	Apps	(Gls)
1981–1997	Porto	408	(17)

International career
1978–1980	Portugal U18	20	(0)
1982–1983	Portugal U21	10	(0)
1983–1996	Portugal	70	(1)

Managerial career
- 1997–2004: Porto (youth)
- 2006–2010: Porto (assistant)
- 2010–2011: Covilhã
- 2013: Chaves
Medal record
Men's football
Representing Portugal
UEFA European Championship
Bronze medal – third place	1984 France
- * Club domestic league appearances and goals

João Domingos da Silva Pinto (born 21 November 1961) is a Portuguese former footballer and manager. He spent his entire professional career with Porto (16 years, winning a total of 24 major titles, including nine Primeira Liga and the 1987 European Cup).

Pinto represented the Portugal national team for more than one decade, appearing with them in one World Cup and one European Championship.

== Playing career ==
Pinto was born in Oliveira do Douro, Vila Nova de Gaia, Porto District. A FC Porto trainee, it did not take him long to establish himself in the side's starting XI. When Fernando Gomes broke his leg before the 1986–87 European Cup final against FC Bayern Munich, he was picked as the captain, and reportedly only released the cup on Portuguese soil after the 2–1 win in Vienna.

Always an undisputed starter, Pinto retired after the 1996–97 season after 16 years as a professional, helping the northerners to their first three Primeira Liga titles in a row (in total, he won nine national championships and four Taça de Portugal, and was part of the treble-winning squad which won the Champions Cup, the European Supercup and the Intercontinental Cup). Given his devotion and long service to the club, he was subsequently given a place coaching its youth teams.

Pinto totalled 70 caps with one goal for Portugal, being selected as captain on 42 occasions. After seeing the nation's 1994 FIFA World Cup qualification hopes squashed following a 1–0 away loss against Italy he left the field in tears, further enhancing his nickname, Capitão; he played internationally in UEFA Euro 1984 and at the 1986 World Cup – Bobby Robson, who coached Porto, once remarked of him: "He has two hearts and four legs. It's extremely difficult to find a player like him."

In September 2023, Pinto was given the One-Club Man Award by Athletic Bilbao, a Spanish club renowned for its youth system policies.

== Coaching career ==
Pinto began working as a head coach in the Segunda Liga. He started with S.C. Covilhã, moving in January 2013 to G.D. Chaves and helping the latter side to promote to that level in his only season.

== Career statistics ==
=== Club ===
Appearances and goals by club, season and competition
Club	Season	League			National cup (Note: Includes Taça de Portugal)		Europe		Other		Total	
Club	Season	Division	Apps	Goals	Apps	Goals	Apps	Goals	Apps	Goals	Apps	Goals
Porto	1981–82	Primeira Divisão	7	0	2	0	0	0	2 (Note: Appearances in Supertaça Cândido de Oliveira)	0	11	0
Porto	1982–83	Primeira Divisão	23	0	6	1	2 (Note: Appearances in UEFA Cup)	0	—		31	1
Porto	1983–84	Primeira Divisão	26	0	9	0	9 (Note: Appearances in UEFA Cup Winners' Cup)	0	2	0	46	0
Porto	1984–85	Primeira Divisão	30	0	7	0	2	0	4	0	43	0
Porto	1985–86	Primeira Divisão	18	1	3	0	4 (Note: Appearances in European Cup)	0	2	0	27	1
Porto	1986–87	Primeira Divisão	29	3	5	0	9	0	2	0	45	3
Porto	1987–88	Primeira Divisão	34	1	7	0	4	0	3 (Note: Two appearances in European Super Cup, one appearance in Intercontinental Cup)	0	48	1
Porto	1988–89	Primeira Divisão	35	1	4	0	3	0	2	0	44	1
Porto	1989–90	Primeira Divisão	30	0	3	0	6	0	—		39	0
Porto	1990–91	Primeira Divisão	30	0	5	1	5	0	2	0	42	1
Porto	1991–92	Primeira Divisão	33	8	6	0	4	0	1	0	44	8
Porto	1992–93	Primeira Divisão	25	2	2	0	8 (Note: Appearances in UEFA Champions League)	0	3	1	38	3
Porto	1993–94	Primeira Divisão	31	1	6	0	10	0	2	0	49	1
Porto	1994–95	Primeira Divisão	31	0	2	0	4	0	3	0	40	0
Porto	1995–96	Primeira Divisão	13	0	6	0	4	0	0	0	23	0
Porto	1996–97	Primeira Divisão	13	0	2	0	2	0	0	0	17	0
Career Total			408	17	75	2	76	0	28	1	587	20

=== International ===
Appearances and goals by national team and year
National team	Year	Apps	Goals
Portugal	1983	4	0
Portugal	1984	10	0
Portugal	1985	7	0
Portugal	1986	1	0
Portugal	1987	2	0
Portugal	1989	11	1
Portugal	1990	3	0
Portugal	1991	9	0
Portugal	1992	8	0
Portugal	1993	7	0
Portugal	1994	5	0
Portugal	1995	2	0
Portugal	1996	1	0
Total		70	1

Scores and results list Portugal's goal tally first, score column indicates score after each Pinto goal.

List of international goals scored by João Pinto
No.	Date	Venue	Opponent	Score	Result	Competition
1	26 April 1989	Estádio da Luz, Lisbon, Portugal	Switzerland	1–0	3–1	1990 World Cup qualification

== Honours ==
=== Player ===
Porto

- Primeira Divisão: 1984–85, 1985–86, 1987–88, 1989–90, 1991–92, 1992–93, 1994–95, 1995–96, 1996–97
- Taça de Portugal: 1983–84, 1987–88, 1990–91, 1993–94
- Supertaça Cândido de Oliveira: 1981, 1983, 1984, 1986, 1990, 1991, 1993, 1994
- European Cup: 1986–87
- European Super Cup: 1987
- Intercontinental Cup: 1987

Individual

- UEFA European Championship Team of the Tournament: 1984
- One Club Award: 2023

=== Manager ===
Chaves

- Segunda Divisão: 2012–13

== See also ==
- List of one-club men
