= José Rafael =

Portuguese footballer

Personal information
- Full name: José António Silvestre Rafael
- Date of birth: 22 November 1958 (age 67)
- Place of birth: Faro, Portugal
- Position: Striker

Youth career
- 1973–1977: Farense

Senior career*
Years	Team	Apps	(Gls)
1977–1979	Farense		
1979–1981	Portimonense	11	(1)
1981–1983	Amora	48	(12)
1983–1984	Farense	21	(11)
1984–1987	Boavista	63	(18)
1987–1989	Vitória Setúbal	17	(5)
1989	Belenenses	0	(0)
Total		160	(47)

International career
1985	Portugal	2	(1)
- * Club domestic league appearances and goals

José António Silvestre Rafael (born 22 November 1958) is a Portuguese retired footballer who played as a striker.

== Club career ==
After starting his professional career with local S.C. Farense in the second division, Rafael spent the following ten seasons in the top level, first appearing rarely with Algarve neighbours Portimonense S.C. over the course of two campaigns. He then signed for Amora F.C. in the 1981 summer, scoring six goals in 25 games in his second year, which ended in relegation.

Rafael returned to Farense for 1983–84, netting a career-best 11 goals as the club eventually avoided relegation. Afterwards, he played three seasons with Boavista FC, appearing in two UEFA Cup editions: on 19 September 1985 he scored twice in a 4–3 home win against Club Brugge KV, albeit in a 5–6 aggregate loss.

Rafael retired from football in June 1989 at nearly 31, after two years with Vitória de Setúbal, amassing top flight totals of 160 matches and 47 goals.

== International career ==
Rafael gained two caps for Portugal, both coming during the 1986 FIFA World Cup qualifiers. He scored on his debut, a 3–2 home win over Malta on 12 October 1985.

José Rafael: International goals
No.	Date	Venue	Opponent	Score	Result	Competition
1	12 October 1985	Estádio da Luz (1954), Lisbon, Portugal	Malta	2–1	3–2	1986 World Cup qualification
