= Eurico Gomes =

Portuguese footballer and manager

Eurico
Personal information
- Full name: Eurico Monteiro Gomes
- Date of birth: 29 September 1955 (age 71)
- Place of birth: Santa Marta de Penaguião, Portugal
- Height: 1.82 m (6 ft 0 in)
- Position: Centre-back

Youth career
- 1970–1975: Benfica

Senior career*
| Years | Team | Apps | (Gls) |
| 1975–1979 | Benfica | 90 | (1) |
| 1979–1982 | Sporting CP | 89 | (2) |
| 1982–1987 | Porto | 89 | (4) |
| 1987–1989 | Vitória Setúbal | 45 | (0) |
| Total | | 313 | (7) |

International career
| 1974 | Portugal U18 | 6 | (0l) |
| 1975–1977 | Portugal U21 | 8 | (0) |
| 1978–1985 | Portugal | 38 | (1) |

Managerial career
- 1989–1990: Rio Ave
- 1990–1991: Torreense
- 1990–1991: Varzim
- 1991: Nacional
- 1992: Ovarense
- 1992–1993: Maia
- 1993–1996: Tirsense
- 1996–1997: União Leiria
- 1997–1999: Paços Ferreira
- 2000–2001: Tirsense
- 2003–2004: Santa Clara (assistant)
- 2005–2006: Maia
- 2006: JSM Béjaïa
- 2006–2007: MC Oran
- 2008–2009: Ethnikos Piraeus
- 2009–2010: Al Wehda
- 2010–2011: Al Raed
- 2015: Louletano
- 2018: Cova Piedade
Medal record
Men's football
Representing Portugal
UEFA European Championship
| Bronze medal – third place | 1984 Fraonce |
- * Club domestic league appearances and goals

Eurico Monteiro Gomes (born 29 September 1955), known simply as Eurico as a player, is a Portuguese former professional football central defender and manager.

He began his career at Benfica, later appearing for Sporting CP and Porto; he became the second player to have represented the Big Three in his country, and the only one to have been champion in all three clubs (twice with each). He totalled 313 matches and seven goals across 14 seasons in the Primeira Liga, winning ten major titles.

Eurico played nearly 40 times with the Portugal national team, appearing at Euro 1984. After retiring, he embarked on a lengthy managerial career.

== Club career ==
Born in Santa Marta de Penaguião, Vila Real District, Eurico made his professional debut with S.L. Benfica at the age of 19, being regularly used in four Primeira Liga seasons and winning back-to-back national championships with the club (he also reached two Taça de Portugal finals). In 1979 he switched to Lisbon rivals Sporting CP, only missing one league game during his three-year spell and winning a total of three titles, including the double in 1981–82.

Aged 27, Eurico signed with another team from the country's Big Three, FC Porto, again being ever-present until suffering a severe injury early into the 1985–86 campaign. He started in the final of the 1983–84 UEFA Cup Winners' Cup, a 2–1 loss against Juventus FC in Basel.

After only one league appearance over his last two seasons at Porto, due to a run-in with manager Artur Jorge – he was thus not a part of the side's victorious run in the European Cup– Eurico signed with Vitória F.C. still in the top division, retiring from football at the age of 33.

Gomes took up coaching in 1989, being in charge of a host of teams in Portugal. He helped F.C. Tirsense to promote to the top flight in 1994, then coached them in a further two full seasons, the latter one ending in relegation. Early into 1996–97 he agreed to terminate his contract with the northerners and joined U.D. Leiria, suffering another top-flight relegation; he was one of the club's three managers during the campaign.

In 2006 and 2007, Gomes worked in Algeria with JSM Béjaïa and MC Oran. On 10 October 2008, he was appointed at Ethnikos Piraeus F.C. in Greece (second division), failing to win promotion.

== International career ==
Eurico earned 38 caps for Portugal, scoring once. His first appearance with the national side was a 1–0 win over the United States in a friendly on 20 September 1978, and his final one was on 3 April 1985 in another exhibition game, now a 2–0 loss with Italy.

Selected for UEFA Euro 1984 in France, Eurico played all the matches and minutes as Portugal reached the semi-finals of the competition.

Eurico Gomes: International goal
| No. | Date | Venue | Opponent | Score | Result | Competition |
|---|---|---|---|---|---|---|
| 1 | 9 June 1984 | Stade Josy Barthel, Luxembourg City, Luxembourg | Luxembourg | 1–1 | 1–2 | Friendly |

== Honours ==
=== Player ===
Benfica

- Primeira Divisão: 1975–76, 1976–77

Sporting CP

- Primeira Divisão: 1979–80, 1981–82
- Taça de Portugal: 1981–82

Porto

- Primeira Divisão: 1984–85, 1985–86
- Taça de Portugal: 1983–84
- Supertaça Cândido de Oliveira: 1983, 1984

=== Manager ===
Tirsense

- Segunda Divisão: 1993–94
