= Quim (footballer, born 1959) =

Portuguese football manager and former player

Personal information
- Full name: Joaquim Carvalho de Azevedo
- Date of birth: 23 August 1959 (age 67)
- Place of birth: Vila do Conde, Portugal
- Height: 1.72 m (5 ft 8 in)
- Position: Midfielder

Team information
- Current team: Rio Ave (under-23 assistant)

Youth career
- 1974–1978: Rio Ave

Senior career*
Years	Team	Apps	(Gls)
1978–1984	Rio Ave	136	(7)
1984–1989	Porto	76	(1)
1989–1990	Tirsense	31	(0)
1990–1992	Farense	40	(0)
1992–1994	Rio Ave	40	(1)
Total		323	(9)

International career
1979	Portugal U20	6	(0)
1985–1987	Portugal	4	(0)

Managerial career
- 1994–1995: Vizela
- 1997–1998: Esposende
- 1999–2001: Canelas
- 2001–2003: Vila Real
- 2003: Pampilhosa
- 2006–2007: Micaelense
- 2018–2022: Rio Ave (youth)
- 2020–: Rio Ave (under-23 assistant)
- * Club domestic league appearances and goals

Joaquim Carvalho de Azevedo (born 23 August 1959), commonly known as Quim, is a Portuguese former professional footballer who played as a defensive midfielder.

== Club career ==
In a 16-year professional career, Vila do Conde-born Quim played for four clubs. He started out at Rio Ave F.C. in his hometown, achieving two Primeira Liga promotions with them during his six-year spell, following which he signed for FC Porto aged 25.

Quim was only regularly used in two of his five seasons with Porto, helping to the conquest of three leagues, one Taça de Portugal and two Supertaça Cândido de Oliveira. He played the first 45 minutes of the 1986–87 European Cup final as the team came from behind to win 2–1 against FC Bayern Munich for their first triumph in the European Cup. Again from the bench, he appeared in that year's Intercontinental Cup, won against Peñarol in extra time, and also took the field in the first leg of the 1987 European Super Cup aggregate victory over AFC Ajax.

For the 1989–90 campaign, Quim joined lowly F.C. Tirsense, contributing 2,500 minutes as the northerners achieved their best-ever classification in the top flight (ninth), after which he spent two years with S.C. Farense also at that level. He then returned to his first club Rio Ave for a couple of Segunda Liga seasons, retiring from the game at 34.

Quim coached several teams in the 90s/2000s, never in higher than the Portuguese third tier.

== International career ==
Between 1985 and 1987, Quim won four caps for Portugal. He was overlooked for the squad that competed at the 1986 FIFA World Cup.

Quim represented the under-20s in the 1979 FIFA World Youth Championship in Japan, appearing in four matches for the eventual quarter-finalists.
