= António Frasco =

Portuguese footballer and manager

Personal information
- Full name: António Manuel Frasco Vieira
- Date of birth: 16 January 1955 (age 71)
- Place of birth: Leça da Palmeira, Portugal
- Height: 1.68 m (5 ft 6 in)
- Position: Attacking midfielder

Senior career*
Years	Team	Apps	(Gls)
1973–1978	Leixões	101	(9)
1978–1989	Porto	238	(15)
1989–1990	Leixões	17	(1)
Total		356	(25)

International career
1979–1987	Portugal	23	(1)

Managerial career
- 1990–1991: Vila Real
- 1991: Ovarense
- 1992–1993: Feirense
- 1993: Leça
- 1997–1998: Lusitânia
- 1998: Aves
- 1999: Louletano
- 1999–2000: Ermesinde
- 2002: Sandinenses
- 2003–2004: Beira-Mar (assistant)
Medal record
Men's football
Representing Portugal
UEFA European Championship
Bronze medal – third place	1984 France
- * Club domestic league appearances and goals

António Manuel Frasco Vieira (born 16 January 1955), known as Frasco, is a Portuguese former professional footballer who played as an attacking midfielder.

Best known for his 11-year spell with Porto, he appeared in 306 competitive matches for the club and won a total of 11 titles. He was chosen by Portuguese sports newspaper Record as one of the best 100 Portuguese players ever.

Frasco earned 23 caps for Portugal, representing the nation at Euro 1984.

== Club career ==
Frasco was born in Leça da Palmeira. In spite of a short height, his first sport was basketball, but Óscar Marques, a scout from Leixões SC, discovered him and took him to the club. He made his debut in the first-team – and the Primeira Liga, a competition in which he would spend 15 of his 17 years as a senior – at the age of 18, contributing ten games as the Matosinhos side barely avoided relegation.

Frasco eventually imposed himself in the main squad, as a starter, as Leixões suffered relegation in 1977. In summer 1978, however, he signed for FC Porto after a failed transfer to S.L. Benfica two years earlier. In his first season he played all 30 matches as the team coached by José Maria Pedroto won the national championship, scoring a career-best six goals the following campaign, with the league being narrowly lost to Sporting CP as the Taça de Portugal to Benfica.

After 1986, Frasco began suffering from successive minor injuries which diminished his importance in the squad. He still appeared in seven games in Porto's victorious campaign in the European Cup, including 25 minutes of the final against FC Bayern Munich (2–1), eventually leaving in June 1989 at the age of 34.

Frasco then worked as a manager, coaching several teams in no higher than the Segunda Liga. He returned to his main club Porto in 2006 and worked with several of its youth sides, always as assistant.

== International career ==
On 17 October 1979, Frasco made his debut for Portugal, in a 2–0 loss to Belgium in Brussels for the UEFA Euro 1980 qualifiers. He was one of the most influential players in the Euro 1984 campaign, taking part in all the matches as they reached the semi-finals and assisting Nené for the only goal against Romania in the group stage.

Over eight years, Frasco played 23 times and scored once.

António Frasco: International goals
No.	Date	Venue	Opponent	Score	Result	Competition
1	4 February 1987	Estádio Primeiro de Maio, Braga, Portugal	Belgium	1–0	1–0	Friendly

== Honours ==
Porto

- Primeira Divisão: 1978–79, 1984–85, 1985–86, 1987–88
- Taça de Portugal: 1983–84, 1987–88
- Supertaça Cândido de Oliveira: 1983, 1984, 1986
- European Cup: 1986–87
- European Super Cup: 1987

== Notes ==
- DIAS, Rui, Record – 100 Melhores do Futebol Português – Volume I (Record – The 100 best of Portuguese Football, 2002, EDISPORT
