= Fernando Gomes (Portuguese footballer) =

Portuguese footballer (1956–2022)

Personal information
- Full name: Fernando Mendes Soares Gomes
- Date of birth: 22 November 1956
- Place of birth: Porto, Portugal
- Date of death: 26 November 2022 (aged 66)
- Place of death: Porto, Portugal
- Height: 1.76 m (5 ft 9 in)
- Position: Striker

Youth career
- 1972–1974: Porto

Senior career*
Years	Team	Apps	(Gls)
1974–1980	Porto	158	(125)
1980–1982	Sporting Gijón	27	(12)
1982–1989	Porto	183	(163)
1989–1991	Sporting CP	63	(31)
Total		431	(331)

International career
1974	Portugal U18	6	(1)
1974–1977	Portugal U21	14	(6)
1975–1988	Portugal	48	(13)
Medal record
Men's football
Representing Portugal
UEFA European Championship
Bronze medal – third place	1984 France
- * Club domestic league appearances and goals

Fernando Mendes Soares Gomes (22 November 1956 – 26 November 2022) was a Portuguese professional footballer who played as a striker.

He achieved great success with Porto, during the late 1970s and 1980s. He represented Sporting CP in the Primeira Liga as well, and also spent two years in Spain with Sporting de Gijón.

The recipient of nearly 50 caps for Portugal, Gomes represented the nation in one World Cup and one European Championship.

== Club career ==
After entering Porto's youth academy, Porto-born Gomes scored twice in his first-team debut in 1974, scoring twice in a 2–1 win over CUF. Except for a two-year stint in La Liga with Sporting de Gijón (nearly one year of inactivity due to tendonitis), when most key players left the Estádio das Antas in support of director of football – later president – Jorge Nuno Pinto da Costa, he was in all important moments of the rebirth of the club: the 20-year Primeira Liga drought end in the 1978–79 season, the first UEFA Cup Winners' Cup final against Juventus in 1984 and, while he missed the 1987 final of the European Cup against Bayern Munich after breaking a leg in training days before, he netted five times in the side's victorious campaign, including once in the semi-finals with Dynamo Kyiv; he still recovered in time to play in the European Supercup against Ajax and the Intercontinental Cup against Peñarol, on both occasions captaining the winner and scoring the opening goal in the latter game for a 2–1 victory.

In addition, Gomes also won five leagues, three Portuguese Cups and three domestic supercups. Due to personality clashes with Porto's board of directors, he signed with Sporting CP, ending his career in 1990–91 after still netting 22 goals in his final season and also helping the Lions to the semi-finals of the UEFA Cup, aged 34.

Gomes retired with Portuguese League totals of 404 matches and 319 goals. His nickname, "Bi-bota", was given after the two European Golden Boot awards he received, in 1983 and 1985. He remained the best goalscorer in the national territory for more than two decades only behind Benfica's Nené, and later returned to Porto, going on to work with the club in an ambassadorial role.

== International career ==
For the Portugal national team, Gomes scored 13 goals in 48 games from 9 March 1975 until 16 November 1988. His final appearance occurred against Luxembourg for the 1990 FIFA World Cup qualifiers, netting the only goal at the Estádio do Bessa.

Gomes was part of the squads at both UEFA Euro 1984 and the 1986 World Cup, reaching the semi-finals of the former tournament, being one of the few players that did not defect from the national side after the latter competition (following the infamous Saltillo Affair) and ending his international career two years later.

== Style of play ==
Apart from being a technically gifted player and a prolific goalscorer, Gomes' talent resided on a fantastic positional sense, which made him very dangerous inside the six-yard box, and earned him a reputation as a "poacher" in the media. In 2023, Tom Hancock of FourFourTwo magazine considered him to be one of the best strikers of the 1980s.

== Personal life and death ==
Gomes once quoted: "Scoring a goal is like having an orgasm." Benfica striker Nuno Gomes, who played in the 1990s and 2000s, chose the nickname "Gomes" in deference to him.

On 17 January 2020, Gomes' daughter Filipa died in mysterious circumstances. She worked in the fashion industry, and was 32.

On 26 November 2022, Gomes died of pancreatic cancer, four days after his 66th birthday. He had been fighting the disease for the three years prior to his death.

== Career statistics ==
=== Club ===
Appearances and goals by club, season and competition
Club	Season	League			National cup (Note: Includes Taça de Portugal and Copa del Rey)		Europe		Other		Total	
Club	Season	Division	Apps	Goals	Apps	Goals	Apps	Goals	Apps	Goals	Apps	Goals
Porto	1974–75	Primeira Divisão	24	14	2	3	2 (Note: Appearances in UEFA Cup)	1	—		28	18
Porto	1975–76	Primeira Divisão	23	10	2	2	3	1	—		28	13
Porto	1976–77	Primeira Divisão	28	26	6	8	1	0	—		35	34
Porto	1977–78	Primeira Divisão	25	25	7	4	1 (Note: Appearances in UEFA Cup Winners' Cup)	1	—		33	30
Porto	1978–79	Primeira Divisão	29	27	1	0	2 (Note: Appearances in European Cup)	1	—		32	28
Porto	1979–80	Primeira Divisão	29	23	5	5	4	2	1 (Note: Appearances in Supertaça Cândido de Oliveira)	0	39	30
Porto	Total		158	125	23	22	13	6	1	0	195	153
Sporting Gijón	1980–81	La Liga	4	1	0	0	—		—		4	1
Sporting Gijón	1981–82	La Liga	23	11	10	3	—		—		33	14
Sporting Gijón	Total		27	12	10	3	—		—		37	15
Porto	1982–83	Primeira Divisão	29	36	6	13	4	1	—		39	50
Porto	1983–84	Primeira Divisão	23	21	5	1	8	4	0	0	36	26
Porto	1984–85	Primeira Divisão	30	39	6	3	2	2	4	2	42	46
Porto	1985–86	Primeira Divisão	30	20	4	1	4	0	2	0	40	21
Porto	1986–87	Primeira Divisão	26	21	5	3	8	5	2	2	41	31
Porto	1987–88	Primeira Divisão	30	21	4	0	1	0	3 (Note: Two appearances in European Super Cup, one appearance and one goal in Intercontinental Cup)	1	38	22
Porto	1988–89	Primeira Divisão	15	5	2	1	3	0	0	0	20	6
Porto	Total		183	163	32	22	30	12	11	5	256	202
Sporting CP	1989–90	Primeira Divisão	26	9	1	0	2	0	—		29	9
Sporting CP	1990–91	Primeira Divisão	37	22	3	2	10	5	—		50	29
Sporting CP	Total		63	31	4	2	12	5	—		79	38
Career Total			431	331	68	49	55	23	12	5	567	408

=== International ===
Appearances and goals by national team and year
National team	Year	Apps	Goals
Portugal	1975	4	0
Portugal	1976	0	0
Portugal	1977	1	0
Portugal	1978	4	1
Portugal	1979	4	0
Portugal	1980	1	1
Portugal	1981	0	0
Portugal	1982	2	1
Portugal	1983	7	0
Portugal	1984	9	2
Portugal	1985	7	4
Portugal	1986	6	2
Portugal	1987	1	1
Portugal	1988	2	1
Total		48	13

Scores and results list Portugal's goal tally first, score column indicates score after each Gomes goal.

List of international goals scored by Fernando Gomes
No.	Date	Venue	Opponent	Score	Result	Competition
1	11 October 1978	Estádio José Alvalade, Lisbon, Portugal	Belgium	1–0	1–1	UEFA Euro 1980 qualifying
2	26 March 1980	Hampden Park, Glasgow, Scotland	Scotland	1–3	1–4	UEFA Euro 1980 qualifying
3	10 October 1982	Estádio da Luz, Lisbon, Portugal	Poland	2–0	2–1	UEFA Euro 1984 qualifying
4	6 September 1984	Estádio do Restelo, Lisbon, Portugal	Bulgaria	1–0	1–0	Friendly
5	12 September 1984	Råsunda Stadium, Stockholms län, Sweden	Sweden	1–0	1–0	1986 FIFA World Cup qualification
6	10 February 1985	National Stadium, Ta' Qali, Ta' Qali, Malta	Malta	2–0	3–1	1986 FIFA World Cup qualification
7	10 February 1985	National Stadium, Ta' Qali, Ta' Qali, Malta	Malta	3–1	3–1	1986 FIFA World Cup qualification
8	12 October 1985	Estádio da Luz, Lisbon, Portugal	Malta	1–0	3–2	1986 FIFA World Cup qualification
9	12 October 1985	Estádio da Luz, Lisbon, Portugal	Malta	3–2	3–2	1986 FIFA World Cup qualification
10	5 February 1986	Estádio Municipal de Portimão, Portimão, Portugal	Luxembourg	2–0	2–0	Friendly
11	19 February 1986	Estádio 1º de Maio, Braga, Portugal	East Germany	1–3	1–3	Friendly
12	23 September 1987	Råsunda Stadium, Stockholms län, Sweden	Sweden	1–0	1–0	UEFA Euro 1988 qualifying
13	16 November 1988	Estádio do Bessa, Porto, Portugal	Luxembourg	1–0	1–0	1990 FIFA World Cup qualification

== Honours ==
Porto

- Primeira Divisão: 1977–78, 1978–79, 1984–85, 1985–86, 1987–88
- Taça de Portugal: 1976–77, 1983–84, 1987–88
- Supertaça Cândido de Oliveira: 1983, 1984, 1986
- European Cup: 1986–87
- European Super Cup: 1987
- Intercontinental Cup: 1987

Individual

- Bola de Prata: 1976–77, 1977–78, 1978–79, 1982–83, 1983–84, 1984–85
- Taça de Portugal top scorer: 1979–80, 1982–83
- European Golden Shoe: 1983, 1985
- Portuguese Footballer of the Year: 1983
