= António Lima Pereira =

Portuguese footballer (1952–2022)

Personal information
- Full name: António José Lima Pereira
- Date of birth: 1 February 1952
- Place of birth: Póvoa de Varzim, Portugal
- Date of death: 22 January 2022 (aged 69)
- Place of death: Portugal
- Height: 1.87 m (6 ft 2 in)
- Position: Centre-back

Youth career
- 1968–1971: Varzim

Senior career*
Years	Team	Apps	(Gls)
1971–1978	Varzim		
1978–1989	Porto	187	(8)
1989–1991	Maia	38	(2)
Total		225+	(10+)

International career
1981–1985	Portugal	20	(0)
Medal record
Men's football
Representing Portugal
UEFA European Championship
Bronze medal – third place	1984 France
- * Club domestic league appearances and goals

António José Lima Pereira (1 February 1952 – 22 January 2022) was a Portuguese professional footballer who played as a central defender.

== Club career ==
Born in Póvoa de Varzim, Lima Pereira started playing professionally with his hometown club Varzim, making his Primeira Liga debut in the 1976–77 season at the age of 24. Two years later he signed for Porto, where he would remain the following 11 campaigns.

Lima Pereira appeared in 265 competitive games during his spell at the Estádio das Antas, winning four national championships, two domestic cups and four Supercups. He also reached the final of the 1983–84 European Cup Winners' Cup as his team lost to Juventus 2–1. Aged already 34/35, he was also part of their victorious campaign in the European Cup in 1986–87, although he did not play the decisive match against Bayern Munich due to injury.

In 1989, Lima Pereira left Porto and joined another northern side, Maia of Segunda Liga, retiring after two seasons at 39.

== International career ==
Lima Pereira won 20 caps for Portugal, the first arriving in 1981 at the age of 29. He was a participant at UEFA Euro 1984, helping the national team to reach the semi-finals in France.

== Personal life and death ==
Lima Pereira's younger brothers, António (born 1966) and Paulo (1967), were also professional footballers and defenders. Both started their careers at Varzim, and their second main clubs were Felgueiras and Rio Ave, amassing top-division totals of 33 and 113 matches respectively. His nephew Tiago also represented Varzim.

On 22 January 2022, Lima Pereira died at the age of 69.

== Honours ==
Varzim

- Segunda Divisão: 1975–76

Porto

- Primeira Divisão: 1978–79, 1984–85, 1985–86, 1987–88
- Taça de Portugal: 1983–84, 1987–88
- Supertaça Cândido de Oliveira: 1981, 1983, 1984
- European Cup: 1986–87
- European Super Cup: 1987
- Intercontinental Cup: 1987
