= Zé Beto =

Portuguese footballer (1960–1990)

Personal information
- Full name: José Alberto Teixeira Ferreirinha
- Date of birth: 21 February 1960
- Place of birth: Matosinhos, Portugal
- Date of death: 4 February 1990 (aged 29)
- Place of death: Porto, Portugal
- Height: 1.81 m (5 ft 11 in)
- Position: Goalkeeper

Youth career
- Pasteleira
- 1977–1978: Porto

Senior career*
Years	Team	Apps	(Gls)
1978–1990	Porto	120	(0)
1979–1980	→ Beira-Mar (loan)	24	(0)
Total		144	(0)

International career
1979	Portugal U20	4	(0)
1986–1987	Portugal	3	(0)
- * Club domestic league appearances and goals

José Alberto Teixeira Ferreirinha (21 February 1960 – 4 February 1990), known as Zé Beto, was a Portuguese professional footballer who played as a goalkeeper.

He spent almost his entire career with Porto, his life being cut short at 29 in a road accident.

== Club career ==
Born in Matosinhos, Zé Beto arrived at FC Porto at the age of 17, making his Primeira Liga debut two years later on loan to S.C. Beira-Mar. After three more seasons as a backup, he was made first-choice for the 1983–84 campaign.

Zé Beto was the starter when Porto lost 2–1 against Juventus FC in the final of the 1983–84 European Cup Winners' Cup, in controversial manner: losing his temper, the player assaulted the assistant referee with his own flag, being suspended by UEFA for a period of two years.

In the following seasons, Zé Beto kept an interesting battle for first-choice status with Pole Józef Młynarczyk (signed in January 1986), eventually losing his position and being further demoted after the emergence of 18-year-old Vítor Baía. He was on the substitutes bench for the northerners' wins in the European and Intercontinental Cups, both in 1987.

Zé Beto died 17 days shy of his 30th birthday, in a car crash in Porto.

== International career ==
After the defection of most of the Portugal national team following the Saltillo Affair at the 1986 FIFA World Cup, Zé Beto earned three caps during the rest of that year and the following. He made his debut on 12 October 1986, in a 1–1 home draw against Sweden for the UEFA Euro 1988 qualifiers.

Previously, Zé Beto played three out of four games at the 1979 FIFA World Youth Championship in Japan, as the under-20s reached the last-eight.
