= Delgado (footballer) =

Portuguese footballer

Personal information
- Full name: José Manuel Mota Delgado
- Date of birth: 30 October 1957 (age 68)
- Place of birth: Lisbon, Portugal
- Height: 1.76 m (5 ft 9 in)
- Position: Goalkeeper

Youth career
- 1972–1974: Braga
- 1974–1976: Sporting Clube de Portugal
1976–1977	Montijo	10	(0)
1977–1981	Belenenses	78	(0)
1981–1982	Portimonense	22	(0)
1982–1988	Benfica	5	(0)
1986–1987	→ Farense (loan)	8	(0)
1987–1988	Benfica	5	(0)
1988–1989	Sporting Espinho	6	(0)

International career
Years	Team	Apps	(Gls)
1976	Portugal U18	4	(0)
1977–1979	Portugal U21	3	(0)
1981	Portugal B	1	(0)

José Manuel Mota Delgado, known as Delgado (born 30 October 1957) is a Portuguese former footballer who played as a goalkeeper.

He played 10 seasons and 128 games in the Primeira Liga for Belenenses, Portimonense, Montijo, Farense, Sporting Espinho and Benfica.

== Club career ==
Delgado made his Primeira Liga debut for Motijo on 2 January 1977 in a game against Belenenses.

During five seasons he spent to Benfica he has been a backup to Manuel Bento for the first 4 seasons, and to Silvino in his last one.

== International career ==
Delgado was called up to the Portugal national team, but did not make any on-field appearances.

== Honours ==
Benfica

- Taça de Portugal: 1982-83, 1984–1985

Portuguese Champion: 1982-83, 1983–84
