= António Sousa =

Portuguese football manager and former player

Personal information
- Full name: António Augusto Gomes de Sousa
- Date of birth: 28 April 1957 (age 69)
- Place of birth: São João da Madeira, Portugal
- Height: 1.76 m (5 ft 9 in)
- Position: Central midfielder

Youth career
- Sanjoanense

Senior career*
Years	Team	Apps	(Gls)
1973–1975	Sanjoanense	39	(11)
1975–1979	Beira-Mar	114	(37)
1979–1984	Porto	138	(29)
1984–1986	Sporting CP	54	(13)
1986–1989	Porto	79	(15)
1989–1993	Beira-Mar	117	(4)
1993–1994	Gil Vicente	7	(0)
1994–1995	Ovarense	32	(2)
1995–1996	Sanjoanense	18	(3)
Total		598	(114)

International career
1974–1975	Portugal U18	9	(2)
1976–1977	Portugal U21	8	(2)
1979	Portugal B	1	(0)
1981–1989	Portugal	27	(1)

Managerial career
- 1995–1997: Sanjoanense
- 1997–2004: Beira-Mar
- 2005–2006: Rio Ave
- 2007–2008: Penafiel
- 2008: Beira-Mar
- 2011: Trofense
Medal record
Men's football
Representing Portugal
UEFA European Championship
Bronze medal – third place	1984 France
- * Club domestic league appearances and goals

António Augusto Gomes de Sousa (European Portuguese pronunciation: [ɐ̃ˈtɔni.u ˈsozɐ, ɐ̃ˈtɔnju -]; born 28 April 1957) is a Portuguese former football central midfielder and manager.

During his career, he played among others for Porto and Sporting CP, amassing Primeira Liga totals of 483 matches and 83 goals over 18 seasons. Subsequently, he worked as a manager for several clubs.

Earning nearly 30 caps for Portugal in the 80s, Sousa represented the nation at the 1986 World Cup and Euro 1984.

== Club career ==
Born in São João da Madeira, Aveiro District, Sousa started professionally with local A.D. Sanjoanense at only 16, with his team in the Segunda Liga. In 1975 he signed with S.C. Beira-Mar, scoring a career-best 15 goals in his third year as the Aveiro club returned to the Primeira Liga; three of his four seasons there were spent in the top division.

Sousa was then bought by FC Porto, where he remained an undisputed starter. He won the league championship once and the Taça de Portugal twice in his first spell, also scoring against Juventus FC in the 1984 European Cup Winners' Cup final, lost 2–1 in Basel.

In summer 1984, Sousa and longtime Porto central midfield partner Jaime Pacheco joined Sporting CP – as part of the deal that sent 17-year-old prodigy Paulo Futre in the opposite direction – with the pair returning after two seasons. He then proceeded to claim the European Cup, the Intercontinental Cup and the UEFA Super Cup with the northerners, continuing to appear regularly (he also scored in the second leg of the Super Cup final).

Sousa retired in 1996 at 39, as player-coach of his first club Sanjoanense. He then dedicated himself exclusively to management, working mainly with another side he played for, Beira-Mar, where he remained for seven and a half years, with four consecutive top-flight seasons. On 19 June 1999, he led the latter to their biggest achievement, the Portuguese Cup, after defeating S.C. Campomaiorense 1–0.

== International career ==
Sousa played 27 times with the Portugal national team from 1981 to 1989, being part of the squads at UEFA Euro 1984 – where he scored in the 1–1 group stage draw against Spain– and the 1986 FIFA World Cup.

António Sousa: International goal
No.	Date	Venue	Opponent	Score	Result	Competition
1	17 June 1984	Stade Vélodrome, Marseille, France	Spain	1–0	1–1	UEFA Euro 1984

== Personal life ==
Sousa's son, Ricardo, was also a professional footballer, also in midfield. The pair shared teams at Beira-Mar in four different spells.

His nephew, José, played ten seasons in the Portuguese top division. His grandson Afonso is also involved in the sport.

== Honours ==
=== Player ===
Porto

- Primeira Divisão: 1987–88
- Taça de Portugal: 1983–84, 1987–88
- Supertaça Cândido de Oliveira: 1981, 1983, 1986
- European Cup: 1986–87
- European Super Cup: 1987
- Intercontinental Cup: 1987

=== Manager ===
Beira-Mar

- Taça de Portugal: 1998–99
