= Jaime Magalhães =

Portuguese footballer

Personal information
- Full name: Jaime Fernandes Magalhães
- Date of birth: 10 July 1962 (age 64)
- Place of birth: Porto, Portugal
- Height: 1.76 m (5 ft 9 in)
- Position: Midfielder

Youth career
- 1976–1980: Porto

Senior career*
Years	Team	Apps	(Gls)
1980–1995	Porto	276	(30)
1995–1996	Leça	4	(0)
Total		280	(30)

International career
1981–1993	Portugal	20	(0)
- * Club domestic league appearances and goals

Jaime Fernandes Magalhães (Portuguese pronunciation: [ˈʒajmɨ mɐɣɐˈʎɐ̃jʃ]; born 10 July 1962) is a Portuguese retired footballer who played as a right midfielder.

During his professional career, he represented Porto for 15 seasons.

== Club career ==
Born in Porto, Magalhães was 14 when he joined local FC Porto's youth system. He made his senior debut four years later, as the northerners were coached by Austrian Hermann Stessl.

Magalhães was an important player in the 1983–84 season, with Porto finishing second to S.L. Benfica in the Primeira Liga and also reaching that campaign's UEFA Cup Winners' Cup final; in the following year he scored a career-best 11 goals, as the club managed to end in the top position in domestic competition.

Magalhães had several offers to leave Porto, but ultimately stayed and won a total of seven leagues, adding in 1987 the European Cup and playing the entire final against FC Bayern Munich. He became a fringe player under Bobby Robson, and left in summer 1995 having appeared in 408 official matches; a move to another side in the north, Leça FC, was then arranged, but he retired at the end of the campaign after the modest team retained their top-flight status, but with the player contributing rarely.

Magalhães was chosen by Portuguese sports newspaper Record as one of the best 100 Portuguese football players ever.

== International career ==
Magalhães made his debut for Portugal on 18 November 1981, in a 2–1 win against Scotland for the 1982 FIFA World Cup qualifiers, at the age of just 19. He was overlooked for the squad that appeared at UEFA Euro 1984, but represented the nation at the 1986 World Cup, earning a total of 20 caps (no goals).

== Honours ==
Porto

- Primeira Liga: 1984–85, 1985–86, 1987–88, 1989–90, 1991–92, 1992–93, 1994–95
- Taça de Portugal: 1983–84, 1987–88, 1990–91, 1993–94
- Supertaça Cândido de Oliveira: 1981, 1983, 1984, 1986, 1990, 1991, 1993
- European Cup: 1986–87
- UEFA Super Cup: 1987
- Intercontinental Cup: 1987
