= Vermelhinho =

Portuguese footballer

Personal information
- Full name: Carlos Manuel Oliveiros da Silva
- Date of birth: 9 March 1959 (age 67)
- Place of birth: São João da Madeira, Portugal
- Height: 1.78 m (5 ft 10 in)
- Position: Winger

Youth career
- Sanjoanense

Senior career*
Years	Team	Apps	(Gls)
1977–1980	Sanjoanense		
1978–1979	→ Paços Brandão (loan)		
1980–1982	Águeda	53	(25)
1982–1989	Porto	84	(14)
1987–1988	→ Chaves (loan)	37	(9)
1989–1990	Braga	21	(1)
1990–1991	Espinho	23	(3)
1991–1995	Sanjoanense	47	(13)
Total		265	(65)

International career
1984	Portugal	2	(0)
Medal record
Men's football
Representing Portugal
UEFA European Championship
Bronze medal – third place	1984 France
- * Club domestic league appearances and goals

Carlos Manuel Oliveiros da Silva (born 9 March 1959), known as Vermelhinho, is a Portuguese former professional footballer who played as a left winger.

== Club career ==
Born in São João da Madeira, Aveiro District, Vermelhinho signed for FC Porto in 1982 after starting out at local A.D. Sanjoanense. In the 1983–84 European Cup Winners' Cup he scored arguably his most important career goal, as the former team won 1–0 away against Aberdeen in the second leg of the semi-finals (2–0 on aggregate): in a foggy night, he netted through an amazing long-range lob, and went on to also play the entire decisive match, lost 2–1 to Juventus FC.

Vermelhinho closed out his career at the age of 36 with his first club Sanjoanense, also having one-season spells with G.D. Chaves, S.C. Braga and S.C. Espinho.

== International career ==
Vermelhinho earned two caps for Portugal, being picked for the squad at UEFA Euro 1984 where he did not leave the bench.
