= Eduardo Luís =

Portuguese football coach and former player

Personal information
- Full name: Eduardo Luís Marques Kruss Gomes
- Date of birth: 6 December 1955 (age 70)
- Place of birth: Loures, Portugal
- Height: 1.80 m (5 ft 11 in)
- Position: Centre-back

Youth career
- 1971–1972: Olivais Sul
- 1972–1974: Benfica

Senior career*
Years	Team	Apps	(Gls)
1974–1975	Marítimo	0	(0)
1975–1976	Benfica	3	(0)
1976–1982	Marítimo	150	(5)
1982–1989	Porto	99	(1)
1989	First Portuguese		
1989–1990	Rio Ave	5	(0)
1990–1992	Ovarense	20	(0)
Total		277	(6)

International career
1980–1987	Portugal	8	(0)

Managerial career
- 1992–1994: Ovarense
- 1995–1996: Aves
- 1996–1998: Maia
- 1999: União Madeira
- 2000–2001: Vilanovense
- 2001–2002: Bragança
- 2002–2003: Benfica Castelo Branco
- 2003–2004: Nogueirense
- 2005–2006: Vila Meã
- 2006–2007: Lourosa
- 2007–2008: Arrifanense
- 2008–2009: Vila Meã
- 2009–2010: Candal
- 2010–2012: Maia Lidador
Medal record
Men's football
Representing Portugal
UEFA European Championship
Bronze medal – third place	1984 France
- * Club domestic league appearances and goals

Eduardo Luís Marques Kruss Gomes (born 6 December 1955), known as Eduardo Luís, is a Portuguese former football central defender and manager.

== Club career ==
Born in Loures, Lisbon District, Eduardo Luís started playing professionally with C.S. Marítimo after unsuccessfully emerging through S.L. Benfica's youth system. He re-signed with the latter for the 1975–76 season, but only appeared in three Primeira Liga games and subsequently returned to the Madeira club, helping it to promote from the Segunda Liga at the first attempt and proceeding to only miss a total of two league matches the following four top-flight campaigns.

In 1981, Marítimo were once again in the second division, and Eduardo Luís appeared in all the games for them en route to another promotion. In summer 1982 he joined FC Porto, being regularly used in two of his seven years with the northern side; his best output was in 1986–87 as he made 27 appearances (one goal) for the second-placed team, which also reached the semi-finals of the Taça de Portugal and added that season's European Cup, with the player featuring the full 90 minutes of the 2–1 final win against FC Bayern Munich.

In 1989, aged 33, Eduardo Luís left Porto and signed for Rio Ave F.C. in the second tier. He returned to Portugal following a brief spell in the Canadian National Soccer League with Toronto First Portuguese, moving to division-three club A.D. Ovarense and earning promotion in his first year.

Eduardo Luís started managing one year after retiring. In the following seasons, he was in charge of more than ten teams in the second and third divisions, his biggest achievement being leading C.D. Aves to the fourth position of the former tier in 1995–96 (no promotion though).

== International career ==
Making his debut for Portugal on 24 September 1980 in a 3–1 friendly loss in Italy, Eduardo Luís went on to win eight caps in nearly seven years. He was selected to the squad that appeared at UEFA Euro 1984, being an unused member for the eventual semi-finalists.
