= 1983–84 Primeira Divisão =

50th season of top-tier Portuguese football

Primeira Liga
- Season: 1983–84
- Champions: Benfica; 26th title
- European Cup: Benfica (first round)
- Cup Winners' Cup: F.C. Porto (first round)
- UEFA Cup: Sporting CP (first round); Braga (first round)
- Matches: 240
- Goals: 599 (2.5 per match)
- Top goalscorer: Nené (21 goals)

The 1983–84 Primeira Divisão was the 50th season of top-tier football in Portugal.

== Overview ==
It was contested by 16 teams, and S.L. Benfica won the championship.

== League standings ==
Pos	Team	Pld	W	D	L	GF	GA	GD	Pts	Qualification or relegation
1	Benfica (C)	30	24	4	2	86	22	+64	52	Qualification to European Cup first round
2	Porto	30	22	5	3	65	9	+56	49	Qualification to Cup Winners' Cup first round (Note: Porto qualified for the Cup Winners' Cup as Portuguese Cup winners)
3	Sporting CP	30	19	4	7	58	24	+34	42	Qualification to UEFA Cup first round
4	Braga	30	15	7	8	40	32	+8	37	Qualification to UEFA Cup first round
5	Vitória de Setúbal	30	13	8	9	43	28	+15	34	
6	Vitória de Guimarães	30	14	3	13	41	41	0	31	
7	Boavista	30	12	7	11	36	31	+5	31	
8	Varzim	30	10	9	11	32	39	−7	29	
9	Rio Ave	30	11	7	12	35	35	0	29	
10	Portimonense	30	10	6	14	27	37	−10	26	
11	Salgueiros	30	6	9	15	23	41	−18	21	
12	Farense	30	5	11	14	29	54	−25	21	
13	Penafiel	30	7	7	16	18	55	−37	21	
14	Estoril (R)	30	6	9	15	22	51	−29	21	Relegation to Segunda Divisão
15	Águeda (R)	30	7	5	18	25	55	−30	19	Relegation to Segunda Divisão
16	Espinho (R)	30	5	7	18	19	45	−26	17	Relegation to Segunda Divisão

Source: RSSSF
(C) Champions; (R) Relegated

== Results ==
Home \ Away	ÁGU	BEN	BOA	BRA	ESP	EST	FAR	PEN	PTM	POR	RAV	SCP	SAL	VAR	VGU	VSE
Águeda		1–4	0–1	0–2	0–1	1–1	1–1	1–0	2–1	0–2	1–0	0–1	4–0	1–0	3–0	0–0
Benfica	2–0		1–0	7–0	6–0	1–1	6–2	8–0	1–0	1–0	1–0	1–1	3–0	2–0	8–0	1–0
Boavista	4–1	1–2		0–2	0–0	1–0	3–0	4–0	2–3	2–1	1–0	0–0	2–1	3–0	0–0	0–1
Braga	5–1	1–1	2–1		2–0	1–0	1–0	1–1	3–0	0–1	2–0	2–1	3–1	1–1	3–0	1–0
Espinho	1–0	0–2	1–1	2–3		2–0	5–2	0–0	0–1	0–1	2–3	0–1	1–0	2–3	0–1	0–1
Estoril	0–0	1–4	0–0	1–0	1–1		0–0	1–0	1–0	0–0	2–1	0–0	1–0	4–2	1–1	1–3
Farense	0–1	2–7	0–0	1–1	3–0	3–1		4–1	0–0	0–2	0–0	1–2	1–1	1–1	1–0	2–1
Penafiel	1–0	0–3	0–0	2–0	0–0	2–0	0–0		1–0	0–1	0–1	1–2	1–0	1–1	1–0	0–0
Portimonense	2–1	0–2	1–2	1–1	3–0	2–0	2–2	3–0		1–0	1–1	0–6	1–0	2–0	0–2	0–0
Porto	6–0	3–1	4–0	1–0	4–0	8–0	7–1	8–1	2–0		3–1	1–0	1–0	3–0	2–0	1–0
Rio Ave	5–1	2–3	1–0	1–1	0–0	4–0	1–0	1–3	2–1	0–0		1–0	2–0	1–1	2–0	2–1
Sporting CP	5–2	0–1	3–2	1–2	2–0	2–1	4–0	5–1	3–0	0–1	4–1		2–0	4–2	2–0	3–1
Salgueiros	0–0	0–2	1–0	0–0	1–0	6–2	1–0	3–1	0–0	0–0	1–1	1–1		0–0	2–1	3–3
Varzim	2–1	1–1	2–4	2–0	3–1	1–0	2–0	2–0	1–0	0–0	1–0	0–1	2–1		1–1	1–1
Vitória de Guimarães	6–1	4–1	4–1	2–0	1–0	2–0	2–1	1–0	0–2	0–1	2–1	2–1	4–0	2–0		3–4
Vitória de Setúbal	2–1	2–3	0–1	3–0	0–0	3–2	1–1	5–0	2–0	1–1	3–0	0–1	2–0	1–0	2–0	

Legend: Blue = home team win; Yellow = draw; Red = away team win.

== Season statistics ==
=== Top goalscorers ===
Rank	Player	Club	Goals
1	(Portugal) Nené	Benfica	21
1	(Portugal) Fernando Gomes	Porto	21
3	(Portugal) Diamantino	Benfica	18
4	(Portugal) Manuel Fernandes	Sporting	17
5	(Portugal) Rui Jordão	Sporting	16
6	(Portugal) Jorge Silva	Boavista	13
7	(Denmark) Michael Manniche	Benfica	12
7	(Portugal) N'Habola	Rio Ave	12
9	(Portugal) José Rafael	Farense	11
9	(Brazil) Jorge Gomes	Braga	11
