= Jaime Pacheco =

Portuguese football manager (born 1958)

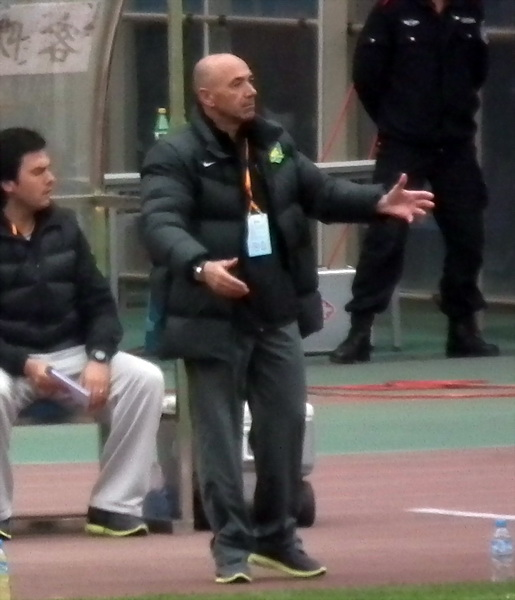
- Pacheco with Beijing Guoan in 2011

Personal information
- Full name: Jaime Moreira Pacheco
- Date of birth: 22 July 1958 (age 68)
- Place of birth: Paredes, Portugal
- Height: 1.70 m (5 ft 7 in)
- Position: Midfielder

Youth career
- Rebordosa

Senior career*
Years	Team	Apps	(Gls)
1976–1979	Aliados Lordelo		
1979–1984	Porto	81	(9)
1984–1986	Sporting CP	39	(2)
1986–1989	Porto	55	(4)
1989–1991	Vitória Setúbal	52	(2)
1991–1993	Paços Ferreira	52	(1)
1993–1994	Braga	17	(1)
1994–1995	Rio Ave	9	(0)
1995	Paredes		
Total		305	(19)

International career
1981	Portugal B	1	(0)
1983–1990	Portugal	25	(0)

Managerial career
- 1993: Paços Ferreira (player-coach)
- 1994: Paços Ferreira
- 1994–1995: Rio Ave (player-coach)
- 1995–1996: União Lamas
- 1996–1997: Vitória Guimarães
- 1997–2003: Boavista
- 2003: Mallorca
- 2004–2005: Boavista
- 2005: Vitória Guimarães
- 2006–2008: Boavista
- 2008–2009: Belenenses
- 2009–2010: Al Shabab
- 2011–2012: Beijing Guoan
- 2014: Zamalek
- 2015: Al Shabab
- 2016–2017: Tianjin TEDA
- 2020–2021: Zamalek
- 2023–2024: Pyramids
Medal record
Men's football
Representing Portugal
UEFA European Championship
Bronze medal – third place	1984 France
- * Club domestic league appearances and goals

Jaime Moreira Pacheco (born 22 July 1958) is a Portuguese former footballer who played as a central midfielder, currently a manager.

During his career he played, among others, for Porto and Sporting CP, amassing Primeira Liga totals of 296 matches and 19 goals over 15 seasons. Subsequently, he worked as a manager for several clubs for more than two decades, including Boavista which he led to its only league title.

A Portugal international on 25 occasions, Pacheco represented the country at the 1986 World Cup and Euro 1984.

== Club career ==
Born in Paredes, Pacheco arrived at Porto from lowly Aliados Lordelo, then in the Segunda Liga. He eventually consolidated himself in the team's starting XI, playing more than 100 competitive matches during his first spell.

In the summer of 1984, Pacheco signed with another Primeira Liga club, Sporting CP, moving alongside teammate António Sousa as part of the deal that sent 17-year-old prodigy Paulo Futre in the opposite direction. The pair returned after two seasons, proceeding to win the European Cup, the Intercontinental Cup and the UEFA Super Cup whilst appearing regularly (Sousa more than Pacheco).

Pacheco joined Vitória de Setúbal aged 31, playing two seasons with both them and Paços de Ferreira and another with Braga – always in the top flight – retiring at the end of 1995 with amateurs Paredes.

== International career ==
Pacheco made his debut for the Portugal national team on 23 February 1983, in a 1–0 friendly win over West Germany. In the following seven years, he won a further 24 caps without scoring.

Pacheco represented the nation at both UEFA Euro 1984 and the 1986 FIFA World Cup, both as a leading player. After a four-year absence he made his final appearance, playing in a 0–0 Euro 1992 qualifier against Finland, on 12 September 1990.

== Coaching career ==
Pacheco took up coaching while still an active footballer, starting with Paços Ferreira. In early 1994, he left Braga (as a player) and returned to the former in the same capacity. In a similar move, he would again act as player-coach, now at Rio Ave, and leave Paredes for Vitória Setúbal midway through the 1995–96 season, after which he concentrated solely on management; also with the Minho side, he managed a fifth place in the 1996–97 campaign and a third in the following.

Pacheco was responsible for Boavista's greatest ever success, the league championship in 2001, followed by a participation in the second group stage of the UEFA Champions League and a 2002–03 UEFA Cup semi-final run. These achievements prompted the interest of La Liga club Mallorca in June 2003, but he was dismissed in September after just five matches and one win, immediately returning to Boavista as a replacement for sacked Erwin Sánchez, whom he had previously managed there.

Following a poor run of results, Pacheco stood down in April 2005. He was then contracted by Vitória Guimarães but resigned in December, after which he again moved to his main club.

Pacheco was at Boavista's helm when the Porto team were relegated to division two at the end of the 2007–08 season, due to the Apito Dourado affair. He then signed with Belenenses, but left by mutual agreement in May 2009 as the Lisbon side were eventually relegated – later reinstated.

Pacheco joined Al Shabab in 2009, winning the Prince Faisal bin Fahd Cup shortly after arriving. However, following a 1–0 group stage loss against Iran's Sepahan in that campaign's AFC Champions League on 15 April 2010, he was relieved of his duties.

In December 2010, Pacheco was signed by Beijing Guoan of Chinese Super League on a year-long contract. In June of the following year, during a match against Tianjin Teda at the Workers Stadium, he waved his middle finger to the referee and the opposite team, being punished with an eight-match suspension and a €4,265 fine by the Chinese Football Association.

Pacheco moved to the third continent of his career in October 2014, when he was appointed at Egypt's Zamalek as a replacement for the dismissed Hossam Hassan. At the turn of the new year, he unexpectedly quit the league leaders to return to Al Shabab; he had a record of eight wins and a draw from ten games and felt disrespected by the club's board. His second spell in Riyadh lasted just until March 2015, when he left by mutual consent to deal with undisclosed personal issues at home.

In August 2016, Pacheco returned to China's top flight by agreeing to a one-year deal with Tianjin Teda. Having completed his goal of keeping them in the league that year, he left the next May after a five-game winless run in the opening stages of the following campaign.

Pacheco returned to Zamalek on 23 September 2020. On 12 March 2021, he was dismissed.

On 5 January 2023, Pacheco took over Pyramids also in the Egyptian Premier League.

== Managerial statistics ==
As of match played 22 August 2024

Managerial record by team and tenure
Team	From	To	Record					Ref.
Team	From	To	P	W	D	L	Win %	Ref.
Vitória Guimarães	15 January 1996	4 November 1997	6	1	2	3	16.7	
Boavista	8 December 1997	30 June 2003	145	70	39	36	48.3	
Mallorca	25 July 2003	30 September 2003	8	3	1	4	37.5	
Boavista	8 March 2004	30 April 2005	45	19	12	14	42.2	
Vitória Guimarães	24 May 2005	9 December 2005	18	5	2	11	27.8	
Boavista	23 October 2006	19 May 2008	60	17	22	21	28.3	
Belenenses	9 October 2008	11 May 2009	29	7	8	14	24.1	
Al Shabab	13 July 2009	15 April 2010	54	33	13	8	61.1	
Beijing Guoan	1 January 2011	18 November 2012	69	29	20	20	42.0	
Zamalek	10 October 2014	31 December 2014	12	9	2	1	75.0	
Al Shabab	16 January 2015	31 March 2015	12	3	4	5	25.0	
Tianjin TEDA	2 August 2016	30 May 2017	24	9	3	12	37.5	
Zamalek	28 September 2020	12 March 2021	27	17	6	4	63.0	
Pyramids	5 January 2023	present	54	29	16	9	53.7	
Total			563	251	150	162	44.6	—

== Honours ==
=== Player ===
Porto

- Primeira Liga: 1987–88
- Taça de Portugal: 1983–84, 1987–88
- Supertaça Cândido de Oliveira: 1981, 1983, 1986
- European Cup: 1986–87
- Intercontinental Cup: 1987
- UEFA Super Cup: 1987

=== Manager ===
Boavista

- Primeira Liga: 2000–01

Al Shabab

- Saudi Federation Cup: 2009–10
