= 2005 in association football =

The following are the association football events of the year 2005 throughout the world.

== Events ==
- January 21 – German referee Robert Hoyzer admits to having accepted large sums of money from a gambling syndicate to fix matches. The resulting scandal was a major embarrassment to Germany as it prepared to host the 2006 FIFA World Cup. Eventually Hoyzer would be sentenced to two years and five months in prison.
- February 3 – Dutch club Fortuna Sittard has three points deducted for financial mismanagement (failure to settle tax debts); an additional deduction of three points on April 29 was confirmed after an appeal on June 13.
- February 4 – Swiss AXPO Super League – Club Servette FC was declared bankrupt. It had run debts of over 10 million Swiss francs. As a consequence of the bankruptcy the club will be demoted two divisions.
- March 20 – Dutch club Go Ahead Eagles has three points deducted for financial mismanagement.
- March 26 – Chelsea won the League Cup after beating Liverpool 3–2
- April 23 – PSV wins its 18th national title in the Dutch Eredivisie.
- April 30 – National Football title assignment in two major European tournaments. In England, Chelsea wins for the second time in the FA Premier League; in Germany, Bundesliga is won for the 19th time by Bayern Munich. In France, RC Strasbourg won second League Cup.
- May 8 – Ligue 1 – Lyon win its fourth French title in 2000s (decade).
- May 14 – Spain Liga – FC Barcelona won its 17th league title.
- May 18 – UEFA Cup Final – CSKA Moscow became the first Russian club to win a major European club competition, defeating Sporting CP 3–1 at Sporting's home field in Lisbon.
- May 20 – Italian Serie A – Juventus won its 28th title ("scudetto") without playing following a 3–3 draw between A.C. Milan and Palermo.
- May 21 – Manager Gert Aandewiel receives the Rinus Michels Award for the best coach in Dutch amateur football.
- May 21 – Arsenal wins the FA Cup Final by defeating Manchester United 5–4 on penalties after regular time and extra time ended 0–0.
- May 25 – 2004–05 UEFA Champions League Final – Liverpool come from three goals down, and beat A.C. Milan 3–2 on penalties after a 3–3 draw in Istanbul to win Europe's top prize for the 5th time.
- May 26 – Dutch club Sparta Rotterdam fires manager Mike Snoei and names former international Adri van Tiggelen as interim-coach.
- June 8 – Goalkeeper and captain Edwin van der Sar plays his 100th international match for the Netherlands, when the side defeats Finland (0–4) in Helsinki.
- July 9 – Spain's Basque Country wins the fourth UEFA Regions' Cup, beating Bulgaria's South-West Sofia 1–0 in Proszowice.
- July 14 – 2005 Copa Libertadores is won by São Paulo FC after defeating Clube Atlético Paranaense on an aggregate score of 5–1.
- August 5 – Ajax wins the Johan Cruijff Schaal, the annual opening of the new season in the Eredivisie, by a 2–1 win over PSV in the Amsterdam ArenA.
- August 26 – The first match of the inaugural Hyundai A-League in Australia was played.
- August 31 – Boca Juniors (Argentina) won the Recopa Sudamericana 2005 4–3 on aggregate over Once Caldas (Colombia). (First leg in Buenos Aires 3–1, second leg in Manizales 1–2)
- November 21 – Head coach Robert Maaskant is fired by Willem II.
- December 9 – 2006 FIFA World Cup group assignments for the finals in Germany announced.
- December 11 – Opening game of the second FIFA World Club Championship, a six team tournament replacing the former Intercontinental Cup. In the final one week later Brazilian team São Paulo FC won the competition narrowly beating UEFA Champions Liverpool 1–0.
- December 18 – Boca Juniors defeated UNAM Pumas on penalties after the second leg game for the Copa Sudamericana 2005.
- December 19 – Manager Cees Lok leaves NEC and is replaced by another former player of the Dutch Club, Ron de Groot.
- December 19 – Ronaldinho (Brazil, for male footballer) and Birgit Prinz (Germany, for female footballer) were elected FIFA World Player of the Year.
- December 31 – Mark Wotte resigns as technical director of Feyenoord.

== Winners national championships ==
=== National club championships in Africa (CAF) ===
- Algeria:
  - Algerian Championnat National – USM Alger
  - Algerian Cup – ASO Chlef
- Angola:
  - Girabola – Grupo Desportivo Sagrada Esperança
  - Angolan Cup – Atlético Sport Aviação
- Benin:
  - Benin Premier League – not playing
- Botswana:
  - Mascom Premier League and FA Challenge Cup – Township Rollers Gaborone
- Burkina Faso:
  - Burkinabé Premier League – Rail Club du Kadiogo
  - Burkina Faso Cup – Union Sportive de Ouagadougou
- Burundi:
  - Burundi Premier League – InterStar Bujumbura
- Cameroon:
  - Cameroon Premiere Division – Cotonsport Garoua
  - Cameroon Cup – Imports FC Yaoundé
- Cape Verde:
  - Premier League – Derby FC Mindelo
- Central African Republic:
  - Central African Republic League – Anges de Fatima
- Chad:
  - Chad Premier League – Renaissance FC
- Comoros:
  - Comoros Premier League – Coin Nord Mitsamiouli
- Republic of the Congo:
  - Congo Premier League – not assigned
  - Congolan Cup – Diables Noirs Brazzaville
- Democratic Republic of the Congo:
  - Linafoot – DC Motema Pembe
  - Republic of Congo Cup – AS Vita Kabasha
- Djibouti:
  - Premier League – AS Compagnie Djibouti-Ethiopie
  - Djiboutian Cup – Poste de Djibouti
- Egypt:
  - Egyptian Premier League and Super Cup – Al-Ahly
  - Egyptian Soccer Cup – ENPPI
- Equatorial Guinea
  - Equatoguinean Premier League – Renacimiento FC
- Eritrea:
  - Premier League – Red Sea FC Asmara
- Ethiopia:
  - Premier League – Saint George SA Addis Abeba
  - Ethiopian Cup – Awassa Kenema
- Gabon:
  - Premier League and Cup – AS Mangasport Moanda
- Gambia:
  - Premier League – Wallidan Banjul
  - Gambian Cup – Bakan United
- Ghana:
  - Ghana Telecom Premier League – Accra Hearts of Oak Sporting Club
  - Ghanaian Cup – Asante Kotoko
- Guinea:
  - Premier League – Satellite FC Conakry
  - Guinean Cup – AS Kaloum Stars Conakry
- Guinea-Bissau:
  - Premier League – Sporting Clube de Bissau
- Ivory Coast:
  - Premier League and Cup – ASEC Mimosas
- Kenya:
  - Premier League – Ulinzi Stars
  - Kenyan Cup – World Hope
- Lesotho:
  - Premier League – Likohpo Masem
- Liberia:
  - Premier League and Cup – LPRC Oilers Monrovia
- Libya:
  - Premier League and Cup – Al Ittihad
- Madagascar:
  - Premier League and Cup – USCA Foot
- Malawi:
  - Premier League – not playing
- Mali:
  - Premier League – Stade Malien Bamako
  - Malian Cup – AS Bamako
- Mauritania:
  - Mauritanean Premier League – ASC Nasr de Sebkha
  - Mauritanean Cup – ASC Entente
- Mauritius:
  - Premier League and Cup – AS Port-Louis 2000
- Morocco:
  - Premier League – FAR Rabat
  - Moroccan Cup – Raja Casablanca
- Mozambique:
  - Moçambola – Ferroviário de Maputo
  - Taça de Moçambique – Ferroviário de Beira
- Namibia:
  - Premier League – Civics FC Windhoek
  - Namibian Cup – Ramblers Windhoek
- Niger:
  - Premier League – unknown
- Nigeria:
  - Premier League and Cup – Enyimba FC Aba
- Rwanda:
  - Premier League – APR FC Kigat
  - Rwandan Cup – Rayon Sports Butare
- São Tomé and Príncipe:
  - Premier League – not held
- Senegal:
  - Premier League – ASC Port Autonome Dakar
  - Senegal Cup – AS Donanes Dakar
- Seychelles:
  - Premier League – La Passe FC
  - Seychelles Cup – Seychelles Marketing Board
- Sierra Leone:
  - Premier League – East End Lions Freetown
- Somalia:
  - Premier League – not held
- South Africa:
  - Premier Soccer League – Kaizer Chiefs Football Club
- Sudan:
  - Premier League – Al Hilal Omdurman
- Swaziland:
  - Premier League – Green Mamba Big Bend
  - Swazilandian Cup – Hub Sundowns
- Tanzania:
  - Premier League – Young Africans Dar es Salaam
- Togo:
  - Premier League – AS Douanes Lomé
  - Togolese Cup – Dynamic Tongolais Lomé
- Tunisia:
  - Premier League – Sfaxien FC
  - Tunisian Cup – ES Zarzis
- Uganda:
  - Premier League – Police FC Jinja
  - Uganda Cup – Uganda Revenus Authority SC Kampala
- Zambia:
  - Premier League – Zanaco Lusaka
- Zimbabwe:
  - Premier League – CAPS United Harare

=== National club championships in Asia (AFC) ===
- Bahrain:
  - Premier League – Riffa Club
  - Bahrain Cup – Al Muharraq Club
- Bangladesh:
  - Premier League – Mohammeddan SC Dhaka
- Bhutan:
  - Premier League – Transport United
- China:
  - Chinese Super League – Dalian Shide
- Hong Kong:
  - HKFA Coolpoint Ventilation First Division League and HKFA Cup – Xiangxue Sun Hei
- India:
  - NFL – Dempo Sports Club
  - Durand Cup – Mahindra United
- Indonesia:
  - Premier League – Persipura Jayapura
  - Indonesian Cup – Arema Malang
- Iran:
  - Iran's Premier Football League – Foolad Ahvaz
  - Azadegan League – Shahid Ghandi Yazd
  - Hazfi Cup – Saba Battery Tehran
- Iraq:
  - Iraq Super League – Al Quwa Al Jawiya
- Japan:
  - J.League Division 1 – Gamba Osaka
  - J.League Cup – JEF United Ichihara Chiba
  - Emperor's Cup – Urawa Reds (played January 1, 2006)
- Jordan:
  - Premier League – Al Wahdat Al Quwaysinah
  - Jordanian Cup – Al Faysali Amman
- Kyrgyzstan:
  - Premier League and Cup – Dordoy Dinamo Naryn
- Kuwait:
  - Premier League – Al Qadisiya
  - Kuwaitian Cup – Al Arabi
- Laos:
  - Premier League – Vientiane FC
- Lebanon:
  - Premier League – Al Nejmeh
  - Lebanon Cup – Al Ansar
- Macau:
  - Premier League – Policia de Segurança Pública
- Malaysia:
  - Super League – Perlis FA Kangar
  - Premier League and Cup – Selangor MPPJ Kelana Jaya
- Mongolia:
  - Premier League – Khoromkon Ulan Baatov
- Myanmar:
  - Premier League – Finance and Revenue Yangon
- Oman:
  - Premier League and Cup – Dhofar Salala
- Pakistan:
  - Premier League – Pakistan Army Rawalpindi
- Qatar:
  - Premier League – Al Gharrafa
  - Qatarian Cup – Al Sadd
- Saudi Arabia:
  - Premier League – Al Hilal Riyad
- Singapore:
  - S.League – Tampines Rovers FC
  - Singapore Cup – Home United FC
- Sri Lanka:
  - Premier League – Saunders SC
  - Sri Lanka Cup – Ratnam SC
- South Korea:
  - Samsung Hauzen 2005 K-League – Ulsan Hyundai Horang-i
  - Samsung 2005 Hauzen Cup – Suwon Samsung Bluewings
  - Korean FA Cup – Chonbuk Hyundai Motors
- Syria:
  - Premier League and Cup – Al Ittihad Alep
- Taiwan:
  - Premier League – Tatung
- Thailand:
  - Premier League – Thailand Tobacco Monopoly
- United Arab Emirates:
  - Premier League – Al Wahda Abu Dhabi
  - UAE Cup – Al Ayn Club
- Uzbekistan:
  - Premier League and Cup – Paktakor Tashkent
- Vietnam:
  - Premier League and Cup – Gach Dong Tam Long An
- Yemen:
  - Premier League – Al Tilal Aden
  - Yemenites Cup – Al Hilal Hudaydah

=== National club championships in Europe (UEFA) ===
- Albania:
  - Superliga and Supercup – SK Tiranë
  - Albanian Cup – KS Teuta Durrës
- Andorra:
  - Primera División – UE Sant Julià
  - Copa Constitució and Supercopa – FC Santa Coloma
- Armenia:
  - Armenian Premier League – Pyunik
  - Armenian Cup – Mika
- Austria:
  - Bundesliga – Rapid Wien
  - Austrian Cup – Austria Wien
- Azerbaijan:
  - AFFA Supreme League – Neftchi Baku
  - Azerbaijan Cup – FK Baku
- Belarus:
  - Belarusian Premier League – FC Shakhtyor Soligorsk
  - Belarusian Cup – MTZ-RIPO Minsk
- Belgium: for fuller coverage, see: 2004–05 in Belgian football
  - Jupiler League and Supercup – Club Brugge
  - Belgian Cup – Germinal Beerschot
- Bosnia and Herzegovina:
  - Premier League – NK Zrinjski Mostar
  - Bosnia and Herzegovina Cup – FK Sarajevo
- Bulgaria:
  - Bulgarian A Professional Football Group – CSKA Sofia
  - Bulgarian Cup and Supercup – PFC Levski Sofia
- Croatia:
  - Prva HNL and Croatian Supercup – Hajduk Split
  - Croatian Cup – NK Rijeka
- Cyprus:
  - Cypriot First Division – Anorthosis Famagusta
  - Cypriot Cup and Supercup – Omonia Nicosia
- Czech Republic:
  - Gambrinus liga – Sparta Prague
  - Czech Cup – Baník Ostrava
- Denmark: for fuller coverage, see: 2004–05 in Danish football
  - Superliga and DONG Cup – Brøndby
- England: for fuller coverage, see: 2004–05 in English football
  - Premiership and League Cup – Chelsea
  - FA Cup – Arsenal
- Estonia:
  - Meistriliiga – FC TVMK Tallinn
  - Esiliiga – JK Vaprus Pärnu, FC Levadia Tallinn, FC Ajax Lasnamäe
  - Estonian Cup – FC Levadia Tallinn
- Faroe Islands:
  - 1. Deild – B36 Tórshavn
  - Faroe Islands Cup – GÍ Gøta
- Finland:
  - Veikkausliiga – MyPa 47 Anjalankoski
  - Finnish Cup – FC Haka Valkeakoski
  - Finnish League Cup – AC Allianssii Vantaa
- France:
  - Ligue 1 – Lyon
  - French Cup – Auxerre
  - French League Cup – Strasbourg
- Georgia:
  - Georgian Premier League – FC Dinamo Tbilisi
  - Georgian Cup – FC Lokomotivi Tbilisi
- Germany:
  - Bundesliga and German Cup – Bayern Munich
- Greece:
  - Greek National Division and Greek Cup – Olympiacos
- Hungary:
  - Arany Ászok Liga – Debreceni VSC
  - Hungarian Cup – Mátav FC Sopron
- Iceland:
  - Icelandic Premier League – FH
  - Icelandic Cup – Valur
  - Icelandic League Cup – KR
- Ireland:
  - League of Ireland and Munster Senior Cup – Cork City
  - FAI Cup – Drogheda United
  - League of Ireland Cup – Derry City
- Israel:
  - Israeli Football Leagues
    - Israeli Premier League – Maccabi Haifa
    - Liga Leumit – Hapoel Kfar Saba
    - Liga Artzit – Hapoel Ashkelon
  - Toto Cup – Hapoel Petah Tikva (Al), Maccabi Netanya (Leumit) and Hapoel Ashkelon (Artzit)
  - Israel State Cup – Maccabi Tel Aviv
- Italy:
  - Serie A – Juventus (stripped of title on July 14, 2006) see also 2004–05 Serie A and 2006 Serie A scandal
  - Italian Cup – Inter Milan
  - Italian Super Cup – AC Milan
- Kazakhstan:
  - Kazakhstan Super League – FC Aktobe-Lento
  - Kazakhstan Cup – FC Zhenis Astana
- Latvia:
  - Virsliga – FK Liepājas Metalurgs
  - Latvian Cup – FK Ventspils
- Liechtenstein:
  - Liechtenstein Football Cup – FC Vaduz
- Lithuania:
  - Lithuanian Premier League – FK Ekranas
  - Lithuanian Cup – FBK Kaunas
- Luxembourg:
  - Premier League – F91 Dudelange
  - Cup – CS Pétange
- Macedonia:
  - Macedonian First League – FK Rabotnički Kometal Skopje
  - Macedonian Cup – FK Bashkimi Kumanovo
- Malta:
  - Maltese Football League and Supercup – Sliema Wanderers
  - Maltese Cup – Birkirkara F.C.
- Moldova:
  - Moldavian Premier League – FC Sheriff Tiraspol
  - Moldavian Cup – FC Nistru Otaci
- Netherlands
  - Eredivisie and KNVB Cup – PSV
  - Eerste Divisie – Heracles Almelo
- Northern Ireland:
  - Irish Premier League and Irish League Cup – Glentoran F.C.
  - Irish Cup – Portadown F.C.
  - Setanta Cup – Linfield F.C.
- Norway: for fuller coverage, see: 2005 in Norwegian football
  - Tippeligaen – Vålerenga
  - Norwegian Cup – Molde
- Poland:
  - Ekstraklasa – Wisła Kraków
  - Puchar Polski – Dyskobolia Grodzisk Wielkopolski
- Portugal:
  - SuperLiga – Benfica
  - Cup of Portugal – Vitória Setúbal
- Romania: for fuller coverage, see: 2004–05 in Romanian football
  - Romanian Premier League – Steaua București
  - Romanian Cup and Romanian Super Cup – Dinamo București
- Russia: for fuller coverage, see: 2005 in Russian football
  - Russian Premier League and Russian Cup – CSKA Moscow
- San Marino:
  - Premier League – F.C. Domagnano
  - Titano Cup – S.S. Pennarossa Chiesanuova
  - Supercup – S.P. Tre Penne Serravalle
- Scotland: for fuller coverage, see: 2004–05 in Scottish football
  - Scottish Premier League and League Cup – Rangers
  - Scottish Cup – Celtic
- Serbia and Montenegro:
  - Meridian Superliga – FK Partizan Belgrade
  - Serbia and Montenegro Cup – FK Voždovac Belgrade
- Slovakia:
  - Slovak Superliga – FC Artmedia Bratislava
  - Slovak Cup – FK Dukla Banská Bystrica
- Slovenia:
  - Slovenian PrvaLiga – Gorica
  - Slovenian Cup – NK Publikum Celje
- Spain:
  - La Liga – Barcelona
  - Copa del Rey – Real Betis
- Sweden: for fuller coverage, see: 2005 in Swedish football
  - Allsvenskan and Svenska Cupen – Djurgårdens IF
- Switzerland:
  - AXPO Super League and Swisscom Cup – FC Basel
- Turkey:
  - Premier Super League – Fenerbahçe
  - Turkish Cup – Galatasaray
- Ukraine:
  - Ukrainian Premier League – FC Shakhtar Donetsk
  - Ukrainian Cup – FC Dynamo Kyiv
- Wales:
  - League of Wales and Welsh Cup – Total Network Solutions
  - FAW Premier Cup – Swansea City

=== National club championships in North and Central America (CONCACAF) ===
- Antigua and Barbuda:
  - Premier League – Bassa FC All Saint's Village
- Aruba:
  - Premier League – SV Britannia
- Bahamas:
  - Premier League – Caledonia Celtic
- Barbados:
  - Premier League – Notre Dame SC Bayville
- Bermuda:
  - Cingular Wireless Premier Division – Devonshire Cougars
  - Bermudian Football Cup – North Village Rams
- Canada:
  - CPSL – Oakville Blue Deville
  - Cascadia Cup – Vancouver Whitecaps
- Cayman Islands:
  - Premier League – Western Union FC George Town
- Costa Rica:
  - Primera División – Liga Deportiva Alajuelense
- Cuba:
  - Premier League – Villa Clara
- Dominica:
  - Premier League – RC Grand Bazaar Dublanc
- El Salvador:
  - Salvadoran Primera División
    - 2004–05 Clausura – Club Deportivo Futbolistas Asociados Santanecos, Santa Ana
    - 2005–06 Apertura – Club Deportivo Vista Hermosa
- Grenada:
  - Premier League – ASOMS Paradise
- Guatemala:
  - Premier League – Deportivo Municipal
- Haiti:
  - Premier League – AS Mirebalais
- HON:
  - Liga Nacional de Fútbol de Honduras
    - 2004–05 Clausura – Olimpia
    - 2005–06 Apertura – Olimpia
- Jamaica:
  - Wray & Nephew National Premier League – Portmore United F.C.
- Mexico:
  - Mexican Primera División
    - 2004–05 Apertura – Pumas UNAM
    - 2004–05 Clausura – Club América
- Nicaragua:
  - Premier League – FC Diriangén Diriamba
- Panama:
  - Premier League – CD Plaza Amador Panama
  - Premier League – San Francisco
- Saint Lucia:
  - Premier League – Northern United Gros Islet
- Suriname:
  - Premier League – SV Robinhood
- United States:
  - MLS Cup and U.S. Open Cup – Los Angeles Galaxy

=== National club championships in Oceania (OFC) ===
- Australia:
  - A-League – not playing
- New Zealand:
  - NZFC – Auckland City FC
  - Chatham Cup – Central United

=== National club championships in South America (CONMEBOL) ===
- Argentina:
  - Primera División
    - 2004–05 Clausura – Vélez Sársfield
    - 2005–06 Apertura – Boca Juniors
- Bolivia:
  - Liga de Fútbol Profesional Boliviano
    - 2004–05 Adecuaciòn – Club Bolívar
    - 2004–05 Apertura – Blooming
- Brazil:
  - Campeonato Brasileiro Série A – Corinthians
  - Copa do Brasil – Paulista F.C.
- Chile:
  - Liga Chilena de Fútbol: Primera División
    - 2004–05 Apertura – Unión Española
    - 2004–05 Clausura – Club Deportivo Universidad Católica
- Colombia
  - Mustang Cup
    - 2004–05 Apertura – Atlético Nacional
    - 2004–05 Clausura – Deportivo Cali
- Ecuador:
  - Serie A de Ecuador
    - Apertura – Liga Deportiva Universitaria de Quito
    - Clausura – Club Deportivo El Nacional
- Paraguay:
  - Liga Paraguaya – Cerro Porteño
- Peru:
  - Peruvian Primera División – Sporting Cristal
- Uruguay:
  - Primera División Uruguaya – Club Nacional de Football
- Venezuela:
  - Primera División Venezolana – Unión Atlético Maracaibo

=== National club championships in non-FIFA-affiliated French dependencies ===
- Guadeloupe (CONCACAF)
  - Premier League – Association Sportive Le Gosier
- (French Guiana) (CONCACAF)
  - Premier League – ASC Le Geldar Kourou
- French Polynesia (AFC)
  - Premier League – AS Tefana Faa'a
  - Cup – AS Manu Ura Paea
- Martinique (CONCACAF)
  - Premier League and Cup – Club Franciscain Le François
- New Caledonia (OFC)
  - Premier League and Cup – AS Magenta Nickel Nouméa
- Réunion (CAF):
  - Premier League – US Stade Tamponnaise Le Tampon
  - Réunion Cup – SS Excelsior Saint-Joseph

== International tournaments ==
- February 3–12: CEMAC Cup 2005 – Winner: Cameroon (Participating countries: Cameroon, Chad, Gabon, Congo, Equatorial Guinea and Central African Republic)
- February 8–9: Cyprus International Tournament 2005 – Winner: Finland (Participating countries: Finland, Cyprus, Latvia, Austria)
- February 9: Carlsberg Cup 2005 – Winner: Brazil (Participating countries: Brazil and Hong Kong)
- UNCAF Nations Cup in Guatemala City, Guatemala (February 19 – 27, 2005)
  1. Costa Rica
  2. Honduras
  3. Guatemala
- February 20–24: CONCACAF Gold Cup 2005 Caribbean Preliminary Competition – Winners: Cuba, Jamaica and Trinidad and Tobago (Participating Countries: Barbados, Cuba, Jamaica and Trinidad and Tobago)
- February 26 – August 14: Cosafa Castle Cup 2005 (Participating countries: Group A: South Africa, Mauritius, Madagascar and Seychelles Group B: Botswana, Namibia, Mozambique and Zimbabwe Group C: Lesotho, Malawi, Swaziland and Zambia)
- March 5–13: East Asian Football Championships 2005 Preliminary Competition – Winner: North Korea (Participating Countries: North Korea, Hong Kong, Chinese Taipei, Mongolia and Guam)
- Baltic Cup in Kaunas (May 21, 2005)
  1. Lithuania
  2. Latvia
- UEFA Women's Championship in England (June 5–19, 2005)
  1. Germany
  2. Norway
- FIFA U-20 World Cup in Netherlands (June 10 – July 2, 2005)
  1. Argentina
  2. Nigeria
  3. Brazil
- FIFA Confederations Cup in Germany (June 15–29, 2005)
  1. Brazil
  2. Argentina
  3. Germany
- CONCACAF Gold Cup in United States (July 6–24, 2005)
  1. United States
  2. Panama
- East Asian Football Championship in Chinese Taipei & South Korea
  1. China
  2. Japan
- FIFA U-17 World Championship in Peru (September 16 – October 2, 2005)
  1. Mexico
  2. Brazil
  3. Netherlands
- 2005 South Asian Football Federation Gold Cup in Pakistan (Dec 7, 2005 – December 17, 2005)
  1. India
  2. Bangladesh

== Qualifying for 2006 World Cup ==
- Note: for fuller coverage, see: 2006 FIFA World Cup (qualification)
- October 2004 – October 2005: Africa Qualifying
  - Qualified teams : Angola, Ghana, Ivory Coast, Togo, Tunisia
    - Participating countries: Algeria, Angola, Benin, Botswana, Burkina Faso, Burundi, Cameroon, Cape Verde, Central African Republic, Chad, Congo, Congo DR, Djibouti, Egypt, Equatorial Guinea, Eritrea, Ethiopia, Gabon, Gambia, Ghana, Guinea, Guinea-Bissau, Ivory Coast, Kenya, Lesotho, Liberia, Libya, Madagascar, Malawi, Mali, Mauritania, Mauritius, Morocco, Mozambique, Namibia, Niger, Nigeria, Rwanda, Senegal, Seychelles, Sierra Leone, Somalia, South Africa, Sudan, Swaziland, São Tomé e Príncipe, Tanzania, Togo, Tunisia, Uganda, Zambia and Zimbabwe
- November 2003 – August 2005: Asia Qualifying
  - Qualified teams: Iran, Japan, Saudi Arabia, South Korea
    - Participating countries: Afghanistan, Bahrain, Bangladesh, Bhutan, Brunei, Cambodia, China, Chinese Taipei, Guam, Hong Kong, India, Indonesia, Iran, Iraq, Japan, Jordan, North Korea, South Korea, Kuwait, Kyrgyzstan, Laos, Lebanon, Macau, Malaysia, Maldives, Mongolia, Myanmar, Nepal, Oman, Pakistan, Palestine, Philippines, Qatar, Saudi Arabia, Singapore, Sri Lanka, Syria, Tajikistan, Thailand, Turkmenistan, UAE, Uzbekistan, Vietnam and Yemen
- February 2004 – October 2005: CONCACAF Qualifying
  - Qualified teams : USA, Mexico, Costa Rica, Trinidad and Tobago (defeated Bahrain in an inter-regional playoff)
    - Participating countries: Anguilla, Antigua and Barbuda, Aruba, Bahamas, Barbados, Belize, Bermuda, British Virgin Islands, Canada, Cayman Islands, Costa Rica, Cuba, Dominica, Dominican Republic, El Salvador, Grenada, Guatemala, Guyana, Haiti, Honduras, Jamaica, Mexico, Montserrat, Netherlands Antilles, Nicaragua, Panama, Puerto Rico, St. Kitts and Nevis, St. Lucia, St. Vincent and the Grenadines, Surinam, Trinidad and Tobago, Turks and Caicos, US Virgin Islands and USA
- August 2004 – October 2005: Europe Qualifying
  - Automatic qualifiers: Germany (as hosts)
  - Qualified teams : Group winners Croatia, England, France, Italy, Netherlands, Portugal, Serbia and Montenegro, Ukraine; two best second-place sides Poland, Sweden; playoff winners Czech Republic, Spain, Switzerland
    - Participating countries: Albania, Andorra, Armenia, Austria, Azerbaijan, Belarus, Belgium, Bosnia-Herzegovina, Bulgaria, Croatia, Cyprus, Czech Republic, Denmark, England, Estonia, Faroe Islands, Finland, France, Germany, Georgia, Greece, Hungary, Iceland, Republic of Ireland, Israel, Italy, Kazakhstan, Latvia, Liechtenstein, Lithuania, Luxembourg, Republic of Macedonia, Malta, Moldova, Netherlands, Northern Ireland, Norway, Poland, Portugal, Romania, Russia, San Marino, Scotland, Serbia and Montenegro, Slovakia, Slovenia, Spain, Sweden, Switzerland, Turkey, Ukraine and Wales
- May 2004 – September 2005: Oceania Qualifying
  - Qualified team: Australia (defeated Uruguay on penalty kicks in an inter-regional playoff)
    - Participating countries: American Samoa, Australia, Cook Islands, Fiji, New Caledonia, New Zealand, Papua New Guinea, Samoa, Solomon Islands, Tahiti, Tonga and Vanuatu
- September 2003 – October 2005: South America Qualifying
  - Qualified teams : Argentina, Brazil, Ecuador, Paraguay
    - Participating countries: Argentina, Bolivia, Brazil, Chile, Colombia, Ecuador, Paraguay, Peru, Uruguay and Venezuela

== Births ==
- February 4 – Saïd Saber, French professional footballer
- April 19 – Kobbie Mainoo, English footballer
- April 24 – Muhammet Arda Uzun, Turkish professional footballer
- October 28 – Darnell Bile, French professional footballer

== Deaths ==
=== January ===
- January 6 – Jean-Luc Fugaldi (59), French footballer
- January 8 – Suvad Katana (35), Bosnia-Herzegovina footballer
- January 17 – Youssouf Samiou (17), Benin footballer
- January 18 – Bernard Béreau (64), French footballer

=== February ===
- February 14 – Ron Burgess (87), Welsh footballer and coach
- February 17 – Omar Sívori (69), Argentinian-Italian footballer
- February 24 – Thadée Cisowski (78), French footballer

=== March ===
- March 3 – Rinus Michels (77), Dutch footballer and manager
- March 9 – István Nyers (80), Hungarian-French footballer
- March 15 – Armand Seghers (78), Belgian footballer
- March 15 – Bill McGarry (77), English footballer and manager

=== April ===
- April 3 – Kader Firoud (85), French footballer and manager
- April 8 – Maurice Lafont (78), French footballer
- April 11 – Lucien Laurent (97), French footballer

=== May ===
- May 5 – Willy Steffen (80), Swiss footballer
- May 7 – Otilino Tenorio (25), Ecuadorian footballer
- May 8 – Gianpietro Zappa (49), Swiss footballer
- May 8 – Wolfgang Blochwitz (64), German footballer
- May 23 – Sígfrid Gràcia (73), Spanish footballer
- May 29 – Gé van Dijk (81), Dutch footballer and manager
- May 29 – Svatopluk Pluskal (74), Czech footballer

=== June ===
- June 25 – Hugo Cunha (28), Portugal footballer

=== July ===
- July 26 – Mario David (71), Italian footballer
- July 28 – Jair da Rosa Pinto, Brazilian midfielder, runner-up at the 1950 FIFA World Cup. (84)

=== August ===
- August 16 – Michel Pavic (83), Yugoslavian footballer and coach
- August 19 – Oscar Muller (48), French footballer

=== September ===
- September 8 – Noel Cantwell (72), Northern Ireland footballer and coach
- September 12 – Alain Polaniok (47), French footballer and coach
- September 13 – Toni Fritsch (60), Austrian footballer (later an American football placekicker)
- September 27 – Karl Decker (84), Austrian footballer and coach
- September 28 – Enric Gensana (69), Spanish footballer

=== October ===
- October 3 – Francesco Scoglio (64), Italian coach
- October 9 – Sergio Cervato (76), Italian footballer
- October 17 – Carlos Gomes (73), Portuguese footballer
- October 18 – Johnny Haynes (71), English footballer
- October 26 – George Swindin (90), English footballer

=== November ===
- November 2 – Ferruccio Valcareggi (86), Italian footballer and coach of Italy national football team
- November 9 – Marceau Sommerlynck (83), French footballer
- November 14 – Erich Schanko (86), German footballer
- November 25 – George Best (59), Northern Ireland footballer
- November 29 – David di Tommaso (26), French footballer
