= 1983–84 European Cup Winners' Cup =

Tournament details
- Dates: 14 September 1983 – 16 May 1984 (competition proper)
- Teams: 33

Final positions
- Champions: (Italy) Juventus (1st title)
- Runners-up: (Portugal) Porto

Tournament statistics
- Matches played: 63
- Goals scored: 198 (3.14 per match)
- Attendance: 1,499,722 (23,805 per match)
- Top scorer(s): Viktor Hrachov; Mark McGhee; Serhiy Morozov; 5 goals each

The 1983–84 season of the European Cup Winners' Cup was won by Juventus in a final against Porto. The next year, the club went on to complete a full complement of European trophies with the European Cup. Aberdeen were the defending champions, but were eliminated in the semi-finals by Porto.

Universitatea Craiova, winners of the 1983 Romanian Cup Final, had their entry rejected since the Romanian Football Federation scheduled the Cup Final for one week after the closing date for entries. As a result, Andrei Rădulescu and Florin Dumitrescu, the president and secretary of the Federation, were sacked.

== Preliminary round ==
Team 1	Agg.	Team 2	1st leg	2nd leg
Swansea City (Wales)	1–2	(East Germany) Magdeburg	1–1	0–1

=== First leg ===
24 August 1983

Swansea City (Wales)	1–1	(East Germany) Magdeburg
Walsh 80'	Report	Streich 88'

Vetch Field, Swansea
Attendance: 6,476
Referee: Erik Fredriksson (Sweden)

=== Second leg ===
31 August 1983

Magdeburg (East Germany)	1–0	(Wales) Swansea City
Pommerenke 24'	Report

Ernst-Grube-Stadion, Magdeburg
Attendance: 25,000
Referee: Georges Konrath (France)

Magdeburg won 2–1 on aggregate.

== First round ==
Team 1	Agg.	Team 2	1st leg	2nd leg
NEC (Netherlands)	2–1	(Norway) Brann	1–1	1–0
Magdeburg (East Germany)	1–7	(Spain) Barcelona	1–5	0–2
Mersin İ. Y. (Turkey)	0–1	(Bulgaria) Spartak Varna	0–0	0–1
Manchester United (England)	3–3 (a)	(Czechoslovakia) Dukla Prague	1–1	2–2
Hammarby (Sweden)	5–2	(Albania) 17 Nëntori Tirana	4–0	1–2
Sligo Rovers (Republic of Ireland)	0–4	(Finland) Haka	0–1	0–3
Glentoran (Northern Ireland)	2–4	(France) Paris Saint-Germain	1–2	1–2
Juventus (Italy)	10–2	(Poland) Lechia Gdańsk	7–0	3–2
Valletta (Malta)	0–18	(Scotland) Rangers	0–8	0–10
Dinamo Zagreb (Socialist Federal Republic of Yugoslavia)	2–2 (a)	(Portugal) Porto	2–1	0–1
B 1901 Nykøbing (Denmark)	3–9	(Soviet Union) Shakhtar Donetsk	1–5	2–4
Servette (Switzerland)	9–1	(Luxembourg) Avenir Beggen	4–0	5–1
AEK Athens (Greece)	3–4	(Hungary) Újpest	2–0	1–4
Wacker Innsbruck (Austria)	2–7	(West Germany) Köln	1–0	1–7
Enosis Neon Paralimni (Cyprus)	3–7	(Belgium) Beveren	2–4	1–3
ÍA (Iceland)	2–3	(Scotland) Aberdeen	1–2	1–1

=== First leg ===
14 September 1983

NEC (Netherlands)	1–1	(Norway) Brann
F. Janssen 42'	Report	Krogh 67'

Goffertstadion, Nijmegen
Attendance: 4,943
Referee: Ángel Franco Martínez (Spain)

14 September 1983

Magdeburg (East Germany)	1–5	(Spain) Barcelona
Pommerenke 58'	Report	Schuster 3'; Maradona 14', 76', 79' (pen.); Periko Alonso 66'

Ernst-Grube-Stadion, Magdeburg
Attendance: 32,000
Referee: Luigi Agnolin (Italy)

14 September 1983

Mersin (Turkey)	0–0	(Bulgaria) Spartak Varna
	Report

Tevfik Sırrı Gür Stadyumu, Mersin
Attendance: 7,810
Referee: Aleksandr Mushkovets (Soviet Union)

14 September 1983

Manchester United (England)	1–1	(Czechoslovakia) Dukla Prague
Wilkins 89' (pen.)	Report	Kříž 60'

Old Trafford, Manchester
Attendance: 39,765
Referee: Adolf Prokop (East Germany)

14 September 1983

Hammarby (Sweden)	4–0	(Albania) 17 Nëntori Tirana
K. Ohlsson 18', 46'; Wahlberg 39'; Lundin 58'	Report

Söderstadion, Stockholm
Attendance: 7,034
Referee: Hugh Alexander (Scotland)

14 September 1983

Sligo Rovers (Republic of Ireland)	0–1	(Finland) Haka
	Report	Valvee 29'

The Showgrounds, Sligo
Attendance: 2,254
Referee: Cornelius Bakker (Netherlands)

14 September 1983

Glentoran (Northern Ireland)	1–2	(France) Paris Saint-Germain
Jameson 75'	Report	Zaremba 78'; N'Gom 84'

The Oval, Belfast
Attendance: 3,061
Referee: Alphonse Constantin (Belgium)

14 September 1983

Juventus (Italy)	7–0	(Poland) Lechia Gdańsk
Platini 18', 26'; Penzo 24', 28', 60', 67'; Rossi 75'	Report

Stadio Comunale Vittorio Pozzo, Turin
Attendance: 29,092
Referee: Raúl Fernandes Nazaré (Portugal)

14 September 1983

Valletta (Malta)	0–8	(Scotland) Rangers
	Report	Paterson 8'; McPherson 17', 34', 42', 48'; MacDonald 36'; Prytz 37', 59' (pen.)

Ta' Qali National Stadium, Ta' Qali
Attendance: 18,213
Referee: Milorad Vlajić (Yugoslavia)

14 September 1983

Dinamo Zagreb (Socialist Federal Republic of Yugoslavia)	2–1	(Portugal) Porto
Kranjčar 25' (pen.), 85'	Report	Gomes 65'

Stadion Maksimir, Zagreb
Attendance: 35,000
Referee: Talal Tokat (Turkey)

14 September 1983
19:00

B 1901 Nykøbing (Denmark)	1–5	(Soviet Union) Shakhtar Donetsk
Bøgvad 50' (pen.)	Report	Morozov 25', 53'; Hrachov 32', 72'; Radenko 43'

Nykøbing Falster Idrætspark, Nykøbing Falster
Attendance: 1,892
Referee: Klaus Peschel (East Germany)

14 September 1983

Servette (Switzerland)	4–0	(Luxembourg) Avenir Beggen
Schnyder 25'; Brigger 52'; Elia 55'; Barberis 75'	Report

Charmilles Stadium, Geneva
Attendance: 5,130
Referee: Georges Konrath (France)

14 September 1983

AEK Athens (Greece)	2–0	(Hungary) Újpest
Kottis 65'; Ross 88'	Report

AEK Stadium, Athens
Attendance: 16,776
Referee: Keith Hackett (England)

14 September 1983

Wacker Innsbruck (Austria)	1–0	(West Germany) Köln
Gröss 71'	Report

Tivoli, Innsbruck
Attendance: 15,500
Referee: Dušan Krchňák (Czechoslovakia)

14 September 1983

Enosis Neon Paralimni (Cyprus)	2–4	(Belgium) Beveren
Zouvanis 12'; Tsierkezos 59'	Report	Schönberger 16'; Garot 29'; Kusto 53'; Stalmans 84'

Dimotiko Stadio Paralimniou, Paralimni
Attendance: 1,000
Referee: Lajos Németh (Hungary)

14 September 1983

ÍA (Iceland)	1–2	(Scotland) Aberdeen
Halldórsson 28'	Report	McGhee 30', 38'

Laugardalsvöllur, Reykjavík
Attendance: 5,577
Referee: Patrick Daly (Republic of Ireland)

=== Second leg ===
27 September 1983

Dukla Prague (Czechoslovakia)	2–2	(England) Manchester United
Štambachr 11'; Daněk 83'	Report	Robson 33'; Stapleton 79'

Stadion Juliska, Prague
Attendance: 25,000
Referee: Heinz Fahnler (Austria)

3–3 on aggregate; Manchester United won on away goals.

27 September 1983

Avenir Beggen (Luxembourg)	1–5	(Switzerland) Servette
Dresch 51'	Report	Elia 33'; Brigger 43', 72'; Castella 62'; Geiger 89'

Stade rue Henri Dunant, Luxembourg City
Attendance: 516
Referee: Louis Delsemme (Belgium)

Servette won 9–1 on aggregate.

28 September 1983

Brann (Norway)	0–1	(Netherlands) NEC
	Report	Mommertz 24'

Brann Stadion, Bergen
Attendance: 11,247
Referee: Alex Jacobsen (Denmark)

NEC won 2–1 on aggregate.

28 September 1983

Barcelona (Spain)	2–0	(East Germany) Magdeburg
Quini 32', 78'	Report

Estadio del FC Barcelona, Barcelona
Attendance: 17,800
Referee: Bruno Galler (Switzerland)

Barcelona won 7–1 on aggregate.

28 September 1983

Spartak Varna (Bulgaria)	1–0	(Turkey) Mersin
Kazakov 61'	Report

Yuri Gagarin Stadium, Varna
Attendance: 5,102
Referee: Radu Petrescu (Romania)

Spartak Varna won 1–0 on aggregate.

28 September 1983

17 Nëntori Tirana (Albania)	2–1	(Sweden) Hammarby
Vila 47'; Mema 64'	Report	Efraimsson 53'

Stadiumi Qemal Stafa, Tirana
Attendance: 19,000
Referee: Gerasimos Germanakos (Greece)

Hammarby won 5–2 on aggregate.

28 September 1983

Haka (Finland)	3–0	(Republic of Ireland) Sligo Rovers
Nissinen 52'; Huoviala 54'; Dziadulewicz 77'	Report

Tehtaan kenttä, Valkeakoski
Attendance: 1,253
Referee: Anatoly Milchenko (Soviet Union)

Haka won 4–0 on aggregate.

28 September 1983

Paris Saint-Germain (France)	2–1	(Northern Ireland) Glentoran
Bathenay 48' (pen.); Sušić 76'	Report	Mullan 20'

Parc des Princes, Paris
Attendance: 22,396
Referee: Vitor Fernandes (Portugal)

Paris Saint-Germain won 4–2 on aggregate.

28 September 1983

Lechia Gdańsk (Poland)	2–3	(Italy) Juventus
Kowalczyk 50'; Kruszczyński 65' (pen.)	Report	Vignola 17'; Tavola 77'; Boniek 83'

Stadion MOSiR, Gdańsk
Attendance: 33,000
Referee: Keith Hackett (England)

Juventus won 10–2 on aggregate.

28 September 1983

Rangers (Scotland)	10–0	(Malta) Valletta
Mitchell 1', 10'; MacDonald 6', 36', 62' (pen.); Dawson 16'; MacKay 52'; Redford 55', 90'; Davies 67'	Report

Ibrox Stadium, Glasgow
Attendance: 12,000
Referee: Guðmundur Haraldsson (Iceland)

Rangers won 18–0 on aggregate.

28 September 1983

Porto (Portugal)	1–0	(Socialist Federal Republic of Yugoslavia) Dinamo Zagreb
Gomes 85'	Report

Estádio das Antas, Porto
Attendance: 45,000
Referee: Bob Valentine (Scotland)

2–2 on aggregate; Porto won on away goals.

28 September 1983
19:00

Shakhtar Donetsk (Soviet Union)	4–2	(Denmark) B 1901 Nykøbing
Morozov 25', 83'; Sokolovsky 37' (pen.); Hrachov 80'	Report	Sokolovsky 23' (o.g.); Bøgvad 77' (pen.)

Shakhtar Stadium, Donetsk
Attendance: 28,600
Referee: Akhmed Yasharov (Bulgaria)

Shakhtar Donetsk won 9–3 on aggregate.

28 September 1983

Újpest (Hungary)	4–1	(Greece) AEK Athens
Kisznyér 10'; Kiss 13'; Kardos 39' (pen.), 74' (pen.)	Report	Vlachos 17'

Megyeri úti Stadion, Budapest
Attendance: 6,618
Referee: Dieter Pauly (West Germany)

Újpest won 4–3 on aggregate.

28 September 1983

Köln (West Germany)	7–1	(Austria) Wacker Innsbruck
Strack 13', 60'; Allofs 15', 53'; Fischer 26', 49'; Steiner 44'	Report	Gröss 31'

Müngersdorfer Stadion, Cologne
Attendance: 15,320
Referee: André Daina (Switzerland)

Köln won 7–2 on aggregate.

28 September 1983

Beveren (Belgium)	3–1	(Cyprus) Enosis Neon Paralimni
Theunis 27'; Lambrichts 29'; Stalmans 36'	Report	Kalimeras 64'

Freethiel, Beveren
Attendance: 2,972
Referee: Norbert Risch (Luxembourg)

Beveren won 7–3 on aggregate.

28 September 1983

Aberdeen (Scotland)	1–1	(Iceland) ÍA
Strachan 68' (pen.)	Report	Áskelsson 89' (pen.)

Pittodrie Stadium, Aberdeen
Attendance: 12,179
Referee: Rolf Nyhus (Norway)

Aberdeen won 3–2 on aggregate.

== Second round ==
Team 1	Agg.	Team 2	1st leg	2nd leg
NEC (Netherlands)	2–5	(Spain) Barcelona	2–3	0–2
Spartak Varna (Bulgaria)	1–4	(England) Manchester United	1–2	0–2
Hammarby (Sweden)	2–3	(Finland) Haka	1–1	1–2 (aet)
Paris Saint-Germain (France)	2–2 (a)	(Italy) Juventus	2–2	0–0
Rangers (Scotland)	2–2 (a)	(Portugal) Porto	2–1	0–1
Shakhtar Donetsk (Soviet Union)	3–1	(Switzerland) Servette	1–0	2–1
Újpest (Hungary)	5–5 (a)	(West Germany) Köln	3–1	2–4
Beveren (Belgium)	1–4	(Scotland) Aberdeen	0–0	1–4

=== First leg ===
19 October 1983

NEC (Netherlands)	2–3	(Spain) Barcelona
A. Janssen 5'; Mommertz 44'	Report	Migueli 45' van Rossum 55' (o.g.); Urbano 70'

Goffertstadion, Nijmegen
Attendance: 24,450
Referee: Heinz Fahnler (Austria)

19 October 1983

Spartak Varna (Bulgaria)	1–2	(England) Manchester United
Dimov 11'	Report	Robson 9'; Graham 48'

Yuri Gagarin Stadium, Varna
Attendance: 23,200
Referee: Walter Eschweiler (West Germany)

19 October 1983

Hammarby (Sweden)	1–1	(Finland) Haka
B. Ohlsson 75'	Report	Kujanpää 33'

Söderstadion, Stockholm
Attendance: 5,995
Referee: Eysteinn Guðmundsson (Iceland)

19 October 1983

Paris Saint-Germain (France)	2–2	(Italy) Juventus
Couriol 39'; N'Gom 90'	Report	Boniek 62'; Cabrini 76'

Parc des Princes, Paris
Attendance: 48,776
Referee: Vojtech Christov (Czechoslovakia)

19 October 1983

Rangers (Scotland)	2–1	(Portugal) Porto
Clark 35'; Mitchell 84'	Report	Jacques 86'

Ibrox Park, Glasgow
Attendance: 27,894
Referee: Siegfried Kirschen (East Germany)

19 October 1983
18:00

Shakhtar Donetsk (Soviet Union)	1–0	(Switzerland) Servette
Hrachov 85'	Report

Shakhtar Stadium, Donetsk
Attendance: 37,450
Referee: Arto Ravander (Finland)

19 October 1983

Újpest (Hungary)	3–1	(West Germany) Köln
Kiss 38', 63'; Kisznyér 43'	Report	Steiner 75'

Megyeri úti Stadion, Budapest
Attendance: 5,729
Referee: Gerald Losert (Austria)

19 October 1983

Beveren (Belgium)	0–0	(Scotland) Aberdeen
	Report

Freethiel, Beveren
Attendance: 11,200
Referee: Dušan Krchňák (Czechoslovakia)

=== Second leg ===
1 November 1983
20:00

Servette (Switzerland)	1–2	(Soviet Union) Shakhtar Donetsk
Brigger 88'	Report	Varnavskyi 58', 61'

Charmilles Stadium, Geneva
Attendance: 14,400
Referee: Alder dos Santos (Portugal)

Shakhtar Donetsk won 3–1 on aggregate.

2 November 1983

Barcelona (Spain)	2–0	(Netherlands) NEC
Periko Alonso 3'; Clos 43'	Report

Estadio del FC Barcelona, Barcelona
Attendance: 16,500
Referee: Károly Palotai (Hungary)

Barcelona won 5–2 on aggregate.

2 November 1983

Manchester United (England)	2–0	(Bulgaria) Spartak Varna
Stapleton 1', 31'	Report

Old Trafford, Manchester
Attendance: 39,079
Referee: Ulf Eriksson (Sweden)

Manchester United won 4–1 on aggregate.

2 November 1983

Haka (Finland)	2–1 (a.e.t.)	(Sweden) Hammarby
Nissinen 40'; Kujanpää 109'	Report	Holmberg 3'

Tehtaan kenttä, Valkeakoski
Attendance: 3,891
Referee: Aleksander Suchanek (Poland)

Haka won 3–2 on aggregate.

2 November 1983

Juventus (Italy)	0–0	(France) Paris Saint-Germain
	Report

Stadio Comunale Vittorio Pozzo, Turin
Attendance: 53,610
Referee: Volker Roth (West Germany)

2–2 on aggregate; Juventus won on away goals.

2 November 1983

Porto (Portugal)	1–0	(Scotland) Rangers
Gomes 52'	Report

Estádio das Antas, Porto
Attendance: 40,000
Referee: Pietro D'Elia (Italy)

2–2 on aggregate; Porto won on away goals.

2 November 1983

Köln (West Germany)	4–2	(Hungary) Újpest
Strack 17'; Littbarski 43'; Allofs 47', 88'	Report	Strack 8' (o.g.); Fekete 69'

Müngersdorfer Stadion, Cologne
Attendance: 45,000
Referee: Svein Thime (Norway)

5–5 on aggregate; Újpest won on away goals.

2 November 1983

Aberdeen (Scotland)	4–1	(Belgium) Beveren
Strachan 38', 60' (pen.); Simpson 44'; Weir 69'	Report	Theunis 73'

Pittodrie Stadium, Aberdeen
Attendance: 23,500
Referee: Henning Lund-Sørensen (Denmark)

Aberdeen won 4–1 on aggregate.

== Quarter-finals ==
Team 1	Agg.	Team 2	1st leg	2nd leg
Barcelona (Spain)	2–3	(England) Manchester United	2–0	0–3
Haka (Finland)	0–2	(Italy) Juventus	0–1	0–1
Porto (Portugal)	4–3	(Soviet Union) Shakhtar Donetsk	3–2	1–1
Újpest (Hungary)	2–3	(Scotland) Aberdeen	2–0	0–3 (aet)

=== First leg ===
7 March 1984

Barcelona (Spain)	2–0	(England) Manchester United
Hogg 33' (o.g.); Rojo 89'	Report

Estadio del FC Barcelona, Barcelona
Attendance: 94,000
Referee: Michel Vautrot (France)

7 March 1984

Haka (Finland)	0–1	(Italy) Juventus
	Report	Vignola 90'

Stade de la Meinau, Strasbourg
Attendance: 17,152
Referee: Ib Nielsen (Denmark)

7 March 1984
21:30

Porto (Portugal)	3–2	(Soviet Union) Shakhtar Donetsk
Pacheco 41' (pen.); Frasco 47'; Jacques 70'	Report	Morozov 6'; Sokolovsky 37'

Estádio das Antas, Porto
Attendance: 55,000
Referee: John Carpenter (Republic of Ireland)

7 March 1984

Újpest (Hungary)	2–0	(Scotland) Aberdeen
Kisznyér 49'; Herédi 78'	Report

Megyeri úti Stadion, Budapest
Attendance: 15,803
Referee: Talal Tokat (Turkey)

=== Second leg ===
21 March 1984

Manchester United (England)	3–0	(Spain) Barcelona
Robson 23', 51'; Stapleton 53'	Report

Old Trafford, Manchester
Attendance: 58,350
Referee: Paolo Casarin (Italy)

Manchester United won 3–2 on aggregate.

21 March 1984

Juventus (Italy)	1–0	(Finland) Haka
Tardelli 15'	Report

Stadio Comunale Vittorio Pozzo, Turin
Attendance: 22,136
Referee: Ioan Igna (Romania)

Juventus won 2–0 on aggregate.

21 March 1984
19:00

Shakhtar Donetsk (Soviet Union)	1–1	(Portugal) Porto
Hrachov 63'	Report	Walsh 72'

Shakhtar Stadium, Donetsk
Attendance: 40,000
Referee: Franz Wöhrer (Austria)

Porto won 4–3 on aggregate.

21 March 1984

Aberdeen (Scotland)	3–0 (a.e.t.)	(Hungary) Újpest
McGhee 38', 85', 94'	Report

Pittodrie Stadium, Aberdeen
Attendance: 22,139
Referee: Alexis Ponnet (Belgium)

Aberdeen won 3–2 on aggregate.

== Semi-finals ==
Team 1	Agg.	Team 2	1st leg	2nd leg
Manchester United (England)	2–3	(Italy) Juventus	1–1	1–2
Porto (Portugal)	2–0	(Scotland) Aberdeen	1–0	1–0

=== First leg ===
11 April 1984

Manchester United (England)	1–1	(Italy) Juventus
Davies 35'	Report	Rossi 14'

Old Trafford, Manchester
Attendance: 58,231
Referee: Jan Keizer (Netherlands)

11 April 1984

Porto (Portugal)	1–0	(Scotland) Aberdeen
Gomes 14'	Report

Estádio das Antas, Porto
Attendance: 45,000
Referee: Ioan Igna (Romania)

=== Second leg ===
25 April 1984

Juventus (Italy)	2–1	(England) Manchester United
Boniek 13'; Rossi 90'	Report	Whiteside 70'

Stadio Comunale Vittorio Pozzo, Turin
Attendance: 54,555
Referee: Alexis Ponnet (Belgium)

Juventus won 3–2 on aggregate.

25 April 1984

Aberdeen (Scotland)	0–1	(Portugal) Porto
	Report	Vermelhinho 76'

Pittodrie Stadium, Aberdeen
Attendance: 23,806
Referee: Dušan Krchňák (Czechoslovakia)

Porto won 2–0 on aggregate.

== Final ==
16 May 1984

Juventus (Italy)	2–1	(Portugal) Porto
Vignola 12'; Boniek 41'	Report	António Sousa 29'

St. Jakob Stadium, Basel
Attendance: 55,000
Referee: Adolf Prokop (East Germany)

== Top scorers ==
Rank	Name	Team	Goals
1	(Soviet Union) Serhiy Morozov	(Soviet Union) Shakhtar Donetsk	5
1	(Soviet Union) Viktor Hrachov	(Soviet Union) Shakhtar Donetsk	5
1	(Scotland) Mark McGhee	(Scotland) Aberdeen	5
4	(Switzerland) Jean-Paul Brigger	(Switzerland) Servette	4
4	(West Germany) Klaus Allofs	(West Germany) Köln	4
4	(Scotland) John MacDonald	(Scotland) Rangers	4
4	(Scotland) Dave McPherson	(Scotland) Rangers	4
4	(England) Bryan Robson	(England) Manchester United	4
4	(Republic of Ireland) Frank Stapleton	(England) Manchester United	4
4	(Portugal) Fernando Gomes	(Portugal) Porto	4
4	(Italy) Domenico Penzo	(Italy) Juventus	4
4	(Poland) Zbigniew Boniek	(Italy) Juventus	4

== See also ==
- 1983–84 European Cup
- 1983–84 UEFA Cup
