= Wilfried Brookhuis =

Dutch footballer

Personal information
- Full name: Wilfried Brookhuis
- Date of birth: 16 October 1961 (age 65)
- Place of birth: Oldenzaal, Netherlands
- Position: Goalkeeper

Team information
- Current team: NEC (goalkeeper coach)

Youth career
- Quick '20

Senior career*
Years	Team	Apps	(Gls)
1983–1985	De Graafschap	60	(0)
1985–1997	NEC	368	(0)
Total		428	(0)

Managerial career
- 2005: NEC (caretaker)
- 2009: NEC (caretaker)
- 2013: NEC (caretaker)
- 2019: Jong NEC (caretaker)
- * Club domestic league appearances and goals

Wilfried Brookhuis (Dutch pronunciation: [ˈʋɪlfrid ˈbroːkɦœys]; born 16 October 1961) is a retired football goalkeeper from the Netherlands, who played professional football for NEC Nijmegen for twelve years (1985–1997).

== Managerial career ==
Brookhuis joined NEC as a goalkeeper coach in 2004. In summer 2013 he was appointed caretaker manager alongside Ron de Groot after Alex Pastoor was sacked. Brookhuis had been caretaker three times before, after the club fired Cees Lok in 2005, Dwight Lodeweges in 2009 and in August 2013.

In March 2018, Brookhuis was hit by a brain haemorrhage but the club later announced, that his situation was stable and not life-threatening. He was then temporarily replaced by Gábor Babos for his position as a goalkeeper coach. He returned to NEC in the July 2018 and was in a reintegration process and continued in his position, which included coaching the goalkeepers and policy-related activities for goalkeeper training for the first team, Jong NEC and the youth academy.

On 3 April 2019, he was appointed as caretaker manager for Jong NEC (the U21 squad or reserve team of NEC) after Ron de Groot was promoted to first team manager.
