= Alex Pastoor =

Dutch footballer and manager (born 1966)

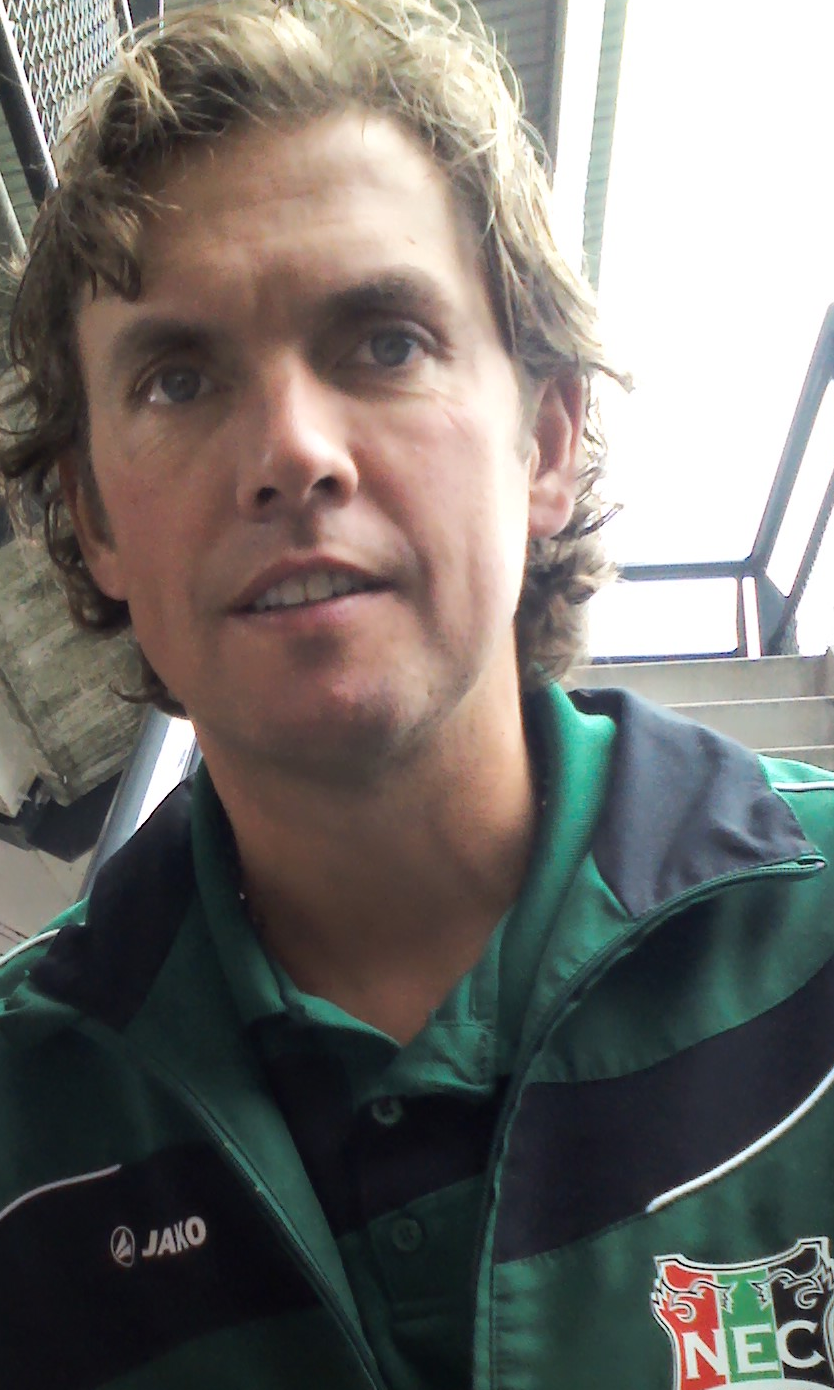
- Pastoor in 2011

Personal information
- Full name: Alexander Anton Aiko Pastoor
- Date of birth: 26 October 1966 (age 60)
- Place of birth: Amsterdam, Netherlands
- Height: 1.80 m (5 ft 11 in)
- Position: Midfielder

Team information
- Current team: PEC Zwolle (manager)

Youth career
- Duinranders

Senior career*
Years	Team	Apps	(Gls)
1989–1995	Volendam	183	(9)
1995–1997	Heerenveen	63	(0)
1998–1999	Harelbeke	18	(0)
1999–2001	Austria Lustenau	45	(1)
2001	SCR Altach		
Total		309	(10)

Managerial career
- 2002–2005: AFC '34
- 2009–2011: Excelsior
- 2011–2013: NEC
- 2014: Slavia Prague
- 2014: AZ (assistant)
- 2014: AZ (caretaker)
- 2015–2017: Sparta
- 2019–2021: SCR Altach
- 2022–2024: Almere City
- 2025: Indonesia (assistant)
- 2026-: PEC Zwolle
- * Club domestic league appearances and goals

Alexander Anton Aiko Pastoor (Dutch pronunciation: [ˈaːlɛks ˈpɑstoːr]; born 26 October 1966) is a Dutch professional football manager and former player who is the manager of Eredivisie side PEC Zwolle.

== Career ==
A former midfielder, Pastoor spent most of his career at FC Volendam, playing with the North-Hollanders from 1989 to 1995. Later on he continued his career at SC Heerenveen, and then in Belgium (with KRC Harelbeke) and Austria (with Austria Lustenau) before retiring in 2001.

== Managerial career ==
=== Early career ===
After his retirement from football as a player, Pastoor entered into management as youth coach of AZ Alkmaar in the 2001–02 season. From 2002 to 2005 he stayed in Alkmaar, as head coach of local amateurs AFC'34. He was successively appointed as reserve team coach of Fenerbahçe for the 2005–06 season, and then as Gertjan Verbeek's assistant at his former club SC Heerenveen from 2006 to 2008. He was then appointed as youth coach of top-ranked Dutch club Feyenoord for the 2008–09 season.

=== Excelsior ===
In July 2009, he took his first head coaching job at a professional level, becoming the boss of Rotterdam-based club Excelsior, a satellite club of Feyenoord. Under his tenure, the small Eerste Divisie side, mostly composed by youngsters on loan from the parent club (and thus all former players of Pastoor under his tenure at Feyenoord), went on to end the regular season in third place and qualify to the promotion playoffs, where they defeated crosstown rivals Sparta Rotterdam in a tense two-legged final and ensured a historic promotion to the Eredivisie.

=== NEC ===
In the summer of 2011, Pastoor moved to NEC, where he succeeded Wiljan Vloet. He signed a contract until 2013. He guided the team to eighth place in the Eredivisie in his first season. In the play-offs for European contention, NEC were eliminated by rivals Vitesse. In March 2013, he extended his contract until 2014. After a poor start to the 2013–14 season, Pastoor was dismissed on 19 August, two days after a 5–1 defeat at home against PEC Zwolle. It was the fastest dismissal ever in an Eredivisie season. He was temporarily succeeded by Ron de Groot and Wilfried Brookhuis, Pastoor's former assistant and goalkeeper coach. At the end of August, Anton Janssen was appointed as Pastoor's permanent replacement.

=== Slavia Prague and AZ ===
On 3 March 2014 Pastoor was appointed manager at Slavia Prague. After a short time in the club, he decided not to extend his contract and instead took the assistant coach role at AZ Alkmaar, coached by Marco van Basten. On 15 September 2014, Alex Pastoor was assigned as caretaker after health problems resulted in Marco van Basten having to step down to the position of assistant. He was sacked by the club after refusing to sign a contract for only nine months.

=== Sparta Rotterdam ===
During the winter break of the 2014–15 season, Pastoor was appointed the new head coach of second-tier Eerste Divisie club Sparta Rotterdam. After he took over the club in sixth place in the table, he finished the season with Sparta in eighth place. In his second season, he won the Eerste Divisie title with Sparta and promoted to the Eredivisie. The 2016–17 season ended in 15th place in the top division. In December 2017, Sparta parted ways with Pastoor. At that point, after 17 match days, Sparta were bottom of the league.

=== Rheindorf Altach ===
In March 2019, Pastoor became coach of Austrian Football Bundesliga club SCR Altach, for whom he had already played as a player. At the time of his appointment, Altach were one point above of the relegation zone in penultimate place in the league table. Under the Dutchman, the Vorarlberg side stabilised again and finally managed to stay in the league at the end of the season, eight points ahead of relegated Wacker Innsbruck.

In the 2019–20 season, they were in mid-table for the entire season and finished the season in eighth place, which meant they were eligible to play-offs for European football, although they were eliminated in the first round by Austria Wien.

In the 2020–21 season, they were again in a relegation battle throughout the season, and in February 2021, Pastoor was released with Altach bottom of the league table. On 23 February 2021, he was sacked from the team that was last in the Bundesliga.

=== Almere City ===
Pastoor was named manager of Eerste Divisie side Almere City in December 2021. Under his tenure, Almere City won their first ever promotion to the Eredivisie in the 2022–23 season.

=== Indonesia ===
On 8 January 2025, Pastoor was appointed as an assistant coach for the Indonesia national team under Patrick Kluivert.

On 16 October 2025, following Indonesia elimination from the World Cup qualification, PSSI decided to parted ways with Kluivert and the rests of the coaching staffs including Pastoor through a mutual agreement.

=== PEC Zwolle ===
Pastoor was appointed manager of PEC Zwolle in November 2026.

== Honours ==
=== Manager ===
Sparta Rotterdam

- Eerste Divisie: 2015–16
