= Kujanpää =

Surname list

Kujanpää is a surname. Notable people with the surname include:

- Aatu Kujanpää (born 1998), Finnish footballer
- Eino Kujanpää (1904–1980), Finnish construction worker and politician
- Jarmo Kujanpää (born 1959), Finnish footballer
