= John Frandsen =

John Frandsen may refer to:

- John Frandsen (composer), Danish composer and organist
- John Frandsen (conductor), Danish conductor
- John Frandsen (footballer), Danish footballer
