= Gábor Babos =

Hungarian footballer

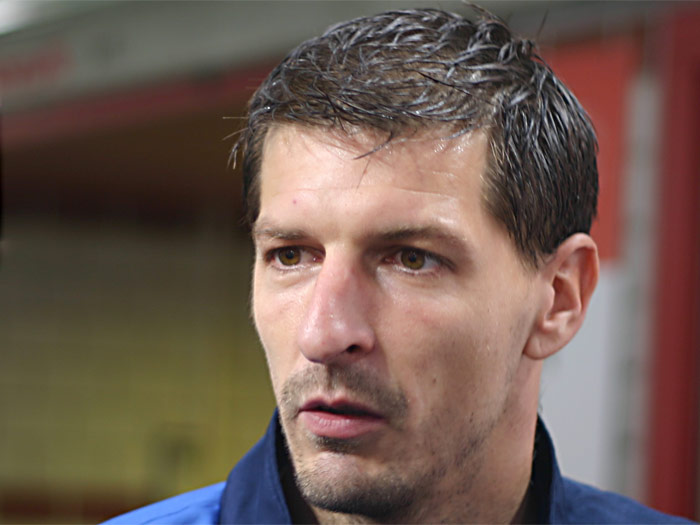

Personal information
- Date of birth: 24 October 1974 (age 52)
- Place of birth: Sopron, Hungary
- Height: 1.96 m (6 ft 5 in)
- Position: Goalkeeper

Youth career
- Soproni LC

Senior career*
| Years | Team | Apps | (Gls) |
| 1993–1995 | Soproni LC | 27 | (0) |
| 1995–2000 | MTK | 141 | (1) |
| 2000–2004 | NAC Breda | 126 | (0) |
| 2004–2006 | Feyenoord | 24 | (0) |
| 2005–2006 | → NEC (loan) | 29 | (0) |
| 2006–2013 | NEC | 198 | (0) |
| 2013–2015 | NAC Breda | 0 | (0) |
| 2022 | NAC Breda | 0 | (0) |
| Total | | 545 | (1) |

International career
| 1997–2009 | Hungary | 27 | (0) |

Managerial career
- 2015–2018: BSC Roosendaal
- * Club domestic league appearances and goals

Gábor Babos (Hungarian: [ˈɡaːbor ˈbɒboʃ]; born 24 October 1974) is a Hungarian footballer who played as a goalkeeper and is the goalkeeper coach of NAC Breda.

Babos played for MTK Hungária, NAC Breda, Feyenoord and NEC. He was also a member of the Hungary national team for twelve years.

On 16 December 2022, he was named for the squad for NAC, although he had retired five years previously.

== Coaching career ==
After his career, Babos started working as a goalkeeper coach for the youth teams of NAC Breda. In November 2015, he became manager of the Roosendaal amateur club BSC, where his son, Dani, played. Though his new manager job, he still continued as a youth goalkeeper coach at NAC.

In March 2018, Babos joined NEC, replacing Wilfried Brookhuis, who was hit by an Intracerebral hemorrhage.

On 16 December 2022, Babos was registered to the NAC Breda squad as an emergency backup due to the illness of their three starting goalkeepers.

== Honours ==
MTK Hungária

- Hungarian League: 1997, 1999; runner-up 2000
- Hungarian Cup: 1997, 1998, 2000

Individual

- Dutch Football Goalkeeper of the Year: 2004, 2008
