= Frans Janssen =

Dutch football player

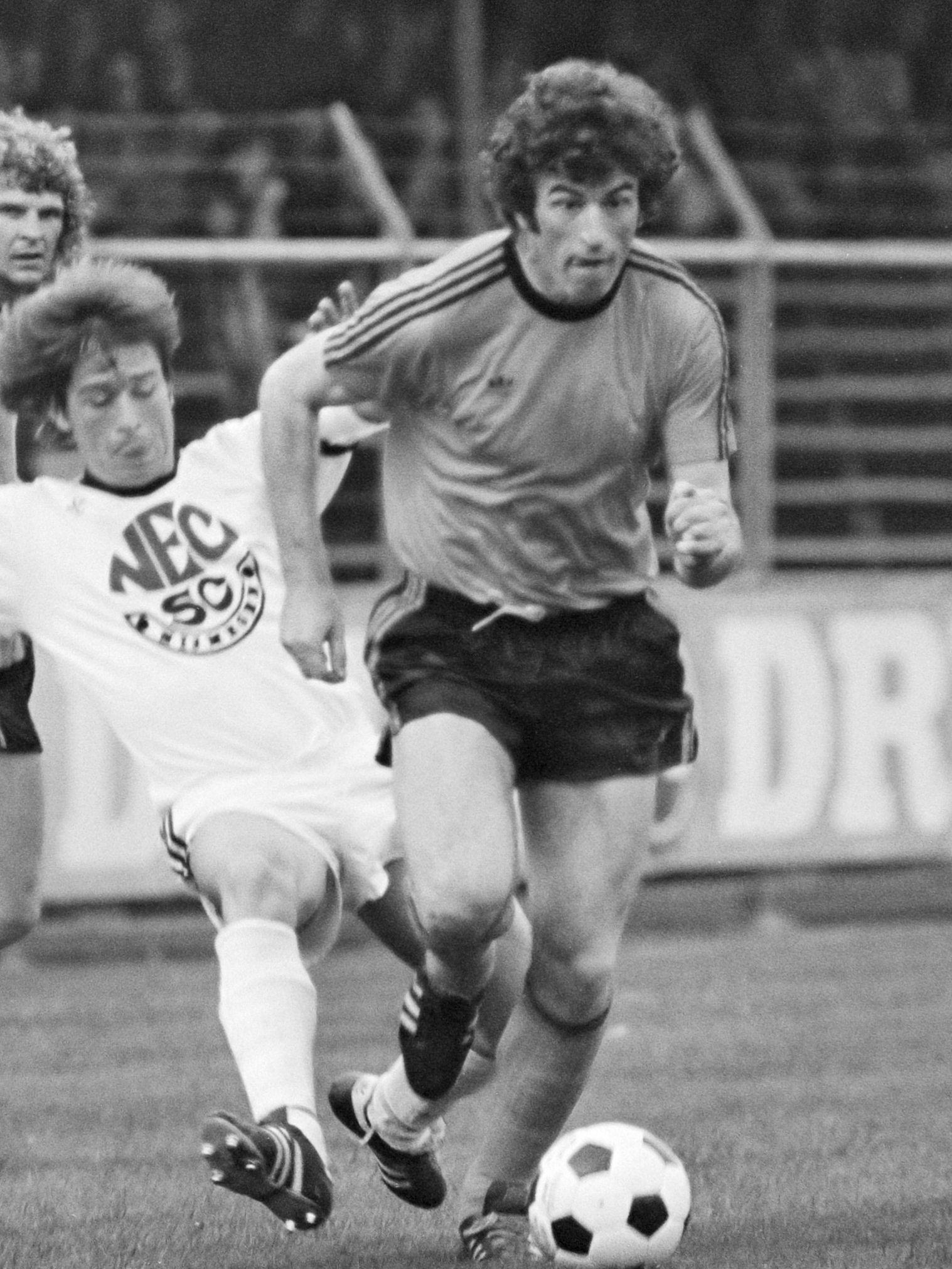
- Frans Janssen (left), tackling FC Volendam's Frank Kramer (1978)

Personal information
- Full name: Frans Janssen
- Date of birth: 3 January 1955 (age 71)
- Place of birth: Groesbeek, Netherlands
- Position: Forward

Youth career
- VV Germania

Senior career*
Years	Team	Apps	(Gls)
1973–1976	VV Germania	-	(-)
1976–1977	Willem II	27	(10)
1977–1992	NEC Nijmegen	430	(126)

Managerial career
- 1992–1994: NEC Nijmegen (assistant)
- 1994–1997: Groesbeekse Boys
- 1997–2001: SC Millingen
- 2001–2004: VV Germania
- 2006–2009: SVO '68
- 2009–2012: VV Germania (assistant)
- 2012–2017: SC Millingen (assistant)
- * Club domestic league appearances and goals

Frans Janssen (born 3 January 1955) is a Dutch former footballer who played as a striker.

== Playing career ==
Janssen started his career at VV Germania in his hometown of Groesbeek, coming through the youth system and playing for the senior side. In 1976 he signed his first professional contract with Willem II, but stayed for only a single season, when he joined NEC Nijmegen.

He played at NEC until 1991, becoming the club's all-time top scorer in the process, with 126 goals in 430 games, and was the club's top scorer on five occasions. He also helped the club to achieve promotion to the Eredivisie in 1985 and 1989. He also played in the 1983 KNVB Cup final against Ajax.

He retired aged 36 in 1991, after NEC's relegation to the Eerste Divisie.

== Coaching career ==
Upon retirement, he became assistant manager at NEC, working firstly under Leen Looijen and later Jan Pruijn, leaving this role in 1994. He then managed a series of lower-league sides in the Netherlands, including his first club, VV Germania, whom he led from the Tweede Divisie to the Hoofdklasse.

== Personal life ==
During his football career, he also worked as a roofer and started his own roofing company in 2004. Since 2009, Janssen has suffered with the lung disease COPD, meaning he is required to breathe using oxygen bottles.

He is the father of former TOP Oss and De Treffers player Dennis Janssen.

In September 2021, a crowdfunding campaign was set up to erect statues of Janssen and Sije Visser outside the Goffertstadion.
