= Mats Wahlberg =

Swedish footballer

Personal information
- Full name: Mats Egil Wahlberg
- Date of birth: 1 May 1961 (age 65)
- Place of birth: Stockholm, Sweden
- Height: 1.89 m (6 ft 2 in)
- Position: Midfielder

Youth career
- IF Cobran

Senior career*
| Years | Team | Apps | (Gls) |
| 1979–1989 | Hammarby IF | 172 | (31) |
| 1990–1991 | Enköpings SK | | |
| 1992 | Assyriska FF | | |

International career
| 1977–1978 | Sweden U17 | 3 | (0) |
| 1978–1979 | Sweden U19 | 5 | (0) |
- * Club domestic league appearances and goals

Mats Wahlberg (born 1 May 1961) is a Swedish former footballer, best known for representing Hammarby IF.

== Club career ==
=== Hammarby IF ===
Born and raised in Stockholm, Wahlberg started to play football with local clubs IF Cobran as a youngster. For two years, Wahlberg won several caps for the Sweden U17 and Sweden U19 national teams. In 1979, at age 17, he made his debut in Allsvenskan, Sweden's top division, with Hammarby IF.

The highlight of Wahlberg's career came in 1982 when Hammarby finished second in the table, going unbeaten the whole season. In the following playoff to decide the Swedish champion, the club went on to beat Örgryte in the quarter-finals and Elfsborg in the semi-finals. In the finals against IFK Göteborg, Hammarby won 2–1 in the first leg away, but lost 1–3 in the home game at Söderstadion to a record crowd, missing out on the gold medal.

After the domestic success the year before, Hammarby competed in the 1983–84 European Cup Winners' Cup. Wahlberg scored one goal as Hammarby eliminated Nëntori Tirana in the first round (5–2 on aggregate), before getting knocked out by Haka in the second round (2–3 on aggregate).

Hammarby IF qualified for the 1985–86 UEFA Cup, where Wahlberg scored one goal as they eliminated Pirin Blagoevgrad in the first round (7–1 on aggregate). The club later beat St Mirren in the second round (5–4 on aggregate), before getting knocked out of the tournament by Köln in the third round (3–4 on aggregate).

The club eventually started to decline and suffered a relegation in 1988 after finishing at the foot of the Allsvenskan table. Competing in Division 1 in 1989, Hammarby secured a promotion by scoring a goal in stoppage time in the very last game of the season, winning 6–0 away against Karlstad BK. They then surpassed contender Vasalunds IF, that had a one-point advantage and were up by five in goal difference before the ultimate round, since they only managed to draw 0–0 against IFK Luleå. Amongst the Hammarby supporters, it soon became known as "Undret i Karlstad" (in English: "the Miracle in Karlstad").

=== Enköpings SK ===
Wahlberg did not return to Allsvenskan with Hammarby IF, and instead decided to join Enköpings SK in 1990, linking up with his former teammate Ulf Eriksson. He won Division 2, the domestic third tier, with the club and enjoyed a promotion after winning against Skövde AIK in the play-offs. In 1991, Enköping finished fourth in the Division 1 table.

=== Assyriska FF ===
Wahlberg ended his career by playing one season with Assyriska FF in 1992, helping the club to reach their first ever promotion to the second tier Division 1.
