= Leen Looijen =

Dutch football manager (born 1947)

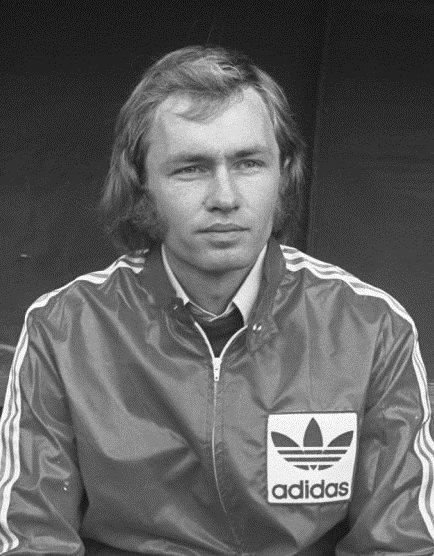

Personal information
- Date of birth: 9 July 1947 (age 79)
- Place of birth: Wageningen, Netherlands

Managerial career
- Years: Team
- 1974: N.E.C.
- 1978–1981: N.E.C.
- 1982–1985: Vitesse Arnhem
- 1985–1986: RKC Waalwijk
- 1986–1987: NAC Breda
- 1987–1991: N.E.C.
- 1992: FC St. Gallen
- 1993: FC Groningen
- 1994–1995: FC Emmen
- 1997: N.E.C.
- 2008: Netherlands Antilles
- 2013: Tuvalu
- 2013: vv Jonker Boys

Leen Looijen (born 9 July 1947) is a Dutch football manager, who has worked in N.E.C., NAC Breda, RKC Waalwijk, FC St. Gallen (Swiss), FC Emmen, Willem II, FC Groningen and Vitesse Arnhem.

== Career ==
Looijen was born in Wageningen. He was head coach of N.E.C. from January to June 1974, from 1978 to 1981 and from 1987 to 1991. From 1994 to July 2007 he served at the same club but as technical director, until this function was taken over by Carlos Aalbers. Then Looijen became head of scouting for NEC. He was also the national coach of the Dutch Antillean football. This position he held until June 2008.

In January 2009 he became technical director of De Graafschap. There he was dismissed on 20 September 2011. In May 2012 his book' "From losing you learn to win" was released.

Looijen coached the national football team of Tuvalu during their three tour of the Netherlands that started on August 16, 2013. The Tuvaluan team trained almost every day in this period and played a total of 20 practice games against amateur clubs from around the country.
