= Jonnie Efraimsson =

Swedish association footballer

Personal information
- Full name: Jonnie Efraimsson
- Date of birth: 15 August 1958 (age 68)
- Place of birth: Sweden
- Position: Forward

Senior career*
Years	Team	Apps	(Gls)
1980–1984	Hammarby IF	63	(13)
1984-1986	IFK Norrköping	38	(8)
1986-1990	Motala AIF	108	(45)

International career
1981	Sweden	1	(0)
- * Club domestic league appearances and goals

Jonnie Efraimsson (born 15 August 1958) is a Swedish former football player.

During his club career, Efraimsson played for Hammarby Fotboll, IFK Norrköping and Motala AIF.

Efraimsson made a single appearances for the Sweden men's national football team, coming in 1981.
