= Saïd Saber =

French footballer

Personal information
- Date of birth: 04.02.2005
- Place of birth: Besançon, France
- Position: Midfielder

Team information
- Current team: Dijon FCO
- Number: 32

Youth career
- 2011–2019: Besançon Football
- 2019–2020: Racing Besançon
- 2020–2021: Dijon

Senior career*
Years	Team	Apps	(Gls)
2021–	Dijon	1	(0)
- * Club domestic league appearances and goals as of 17 January 2022

Saïd Saber is a French professional footballer who plays for Dijon FCO.

== Club career ==
Saïd Saber started his career at Besançon Football, later joining the Racing Besançon, that he eventually left for the Dijon FCO academy in June 2020.

After joining the under-19 in the early 2021–22 season, he made his professional debut for Dijon on the 8 January 2022, replacing Mattéo Ahlinvi at the 63rd minute of a 1–2 Ligue 2 home loss to Nîmes Olympique. While his team was affected by both injuries, covid and players leaving to the 2021 AFCON, Saber became the youngest player to ever play a league game for Dijon, aged only 16 years and 11 months.
