= John Frandsen (footballer) =

Danish footballer (born 1948)

Personal information
- Date of birth: 19 September 1948 (age 78)
- Place of birth: Glostrup, Denmark
- Position: Midfielder

Senior career*
| Years | Team | Apps | (Gls) |
| 1967–1972 | Glostrup IF 32 | | |
| 1972–1973 | Frem | | |
| 1973–1975 | NEC Nijmegen | | |
| 1975–1977 | FC Wageningen | | |
| 1977–1981 | FC Zwolle | | |
| 1981–1983 | Brøndby IF | | |

International career
| 1973 | Denmark national team | 1 | (0) |
- * Club domestic league appearances and goals

John Frandsen (born 19 September 1948) is a Danish former professional footballer who played as a midfielder. He played at Glostrup IF 32, Boldklubben Frem, NEC Nijmegen, FC Wageningen, FC Zwolle and Brøndby IF. He capped once for the Denmark national team in a friendly against Norway.
