= Muhammet Arda Uzun =

Turkish footballer

Personal information
- Date of birth: 24 April 2005 (age 21)
- Place of birth: Şişli, Turkey
- Height: 1.85 m (6 ft 1 in)
- Position: Forward

Team information
- Current team: Beyoğlu Yeni Çarşı

Youth career
- 2014–2019: Çeliktepe Ümitspor
- 2019–2021: Sarıyer
- 2021–2023: Alanyaspor

Senior career*
Years	Team	Apps	(Gls)
2021–2023	Alanyaspor	1	(0)
2022	→ Nevşehir Belediyespor (loan)	5	(2)
2023–	Beyoğlu Yeni Çarşı	0	(0)
- * Club domestic league appearances and goals as of 7 May 2022

Muhammet Arda Uzun (born 24 April 2005) is a Turkish professional footballer who plays as a forward for Beyoğlu Yeni Çarşı.

== Professional career ==
Uzun was a product of the youth academies of Çeliktepe Ümitspor and Sarıyer, before signing shis first professional contract with Alanyaspor on 2 January 2021. He made his professional debut with Alanyaspor in a 1–0 Süper Lig win over MKE Ankaragücü on 15 May 2021.

== International career ==
Uzun was called up for a training camp for the Turkey U15s in October 2020.
