= NEC Nijmegen =

Dutch association football club from Nijmegen

NEC
- Full name: Nijmegen Eendracht Combinatie (Nijmegen Unity Combination)
- Short name: NEC
- Founded: 15 November 1900; 125 years ago
- Stadium: Goffertstadion
- Capacity: 12,650
- Chairman: Ron van Oijen
- Head coach: Dick Schreuder
- League: Eredivisie
- 2025–26: Eredivisie, 3rd of 18
- Website: www.nec-nijmegen.nl
Home colours	Away colours	Third colours

NEC Nijmegen (Nijmegen Eendracht Combinatie), commonly known as NEC or N.E.C. (Dutch pronunciation: [ɛneːˈseː]), is a professional Dutch association football club based in Nijmegen. The club currently competes in the Eredivisie, the top tier of Dutch football.

The club has reached six KNVB Cup finals—1973, 1983, 1994, 2000, 2024 and 2026—but has never won the cup.

== History ==
=== 1900–1919: Merger and early years ===
The oldest remnant of NEC Nijmegen, Eendracht, was formed on 15 November 1900 by three men – August Lodenstijn, Antoon Kuypers and Wouter de Lent – representing the people from the benedenstad (lower town) who, due to their working class status, were not able to play for the major club in the city, Quick 1888.

Due to a lack of funds, Eendracht initially played only friendly matches against teams from other parts of the city until 1903, when the local league in Nijmegen was formed. Eendracht was the first champion and was promoted to Gelderland's regional league, and two years later the club was promoted to the second tier of Dutch football.

Eendracht merged in April 1910 with NVV Nijmegen, a club formed two years earlier by former members of Quick 1888. The new club was given the name Nijmegen Eendracht Combinatie, and played its first match against Amsterdam side DEC, the match ending 0–0.

=== 1920–1939: "Never first-class" ===
After a series of ground moves in the club's early years, at the beginning of the 1920s, NEC bought land and moved to a ground at Hazenkampseweg. Finally, the club had a permanent home and the club's fanbase began to grow. However, despite a new home and increased membership, on-field success did not follow.

Although NEC won second-tier championships in 1928, 1929, 1931, and 1934, the club did not win promotion after losing consecutive play-off matches. The club was mockingly nicknamed "Nooit eerste classer" (lit. 'Never first division'), before being promoted at the fifth attempt in 1936. In 1939, NEC won the first Eastern title and fought for the Dutch title in a playoff competition with four other district champions. NEC came in third place, behind Amsterdam sides Ajax and DWS.

The club moved from Hazenkampseweg in 1942 to the Goffertstadion, located in the Goffertpark on the outskirts of the city, where the club still plays today.

=== 1940–1959: WWII and professional football ===
During the Second World War, little football was played. After liberation, the club's pre-war success continued and again became the champion of the East in both 1946 and 1947.

Professional football was introduced in the Netherlands in 1954, and came at the wrong time for NEC. The club was not in a good financial state and not as well established as other clubs. When the Royal Dutch Football Association (KNVB) reorganised the league structure in time for the 1956–57 season, NEC found themselves in the lowest semi-professional division, the Tweede Divisie.

=== 1960–1973: Recovery ===
At the beginning of the 1960s, NEC began to recover from its financial difficulties. A major reason for this was new support from the municipal council who began to see the importance of a professional club like the NEC, and started providing financial support in 1963. The following year, the club was promoted to the second-tier Eerste Divisie again and three years later, reached the top-tier Eredivisie for the first time, finishing tenth in its first season.

The club remained in the top flight for seven seasons in a row, with some games played in front of capacity crowds; season averages of 14,000 spectators were normal. NEC flourished, primarily due to the development of players from their youth setup, including Frans Thijssen and Jan Peters.

=== 1974–2002: Lean years ===
However, a sharp decline soon followed. NEC could not sustain itself with its only major revenue sources being the sale of players and the large subsidy from the Nijmegen council.

Relegation from the top flight came in 1974, and although NEC returned to the top division the following year, the club was heading in a downward trajectory. During the following years, NEC became renowned as a yo-yo club; in little over a decade, they changed leagues six times: relegation in 1983, promotion in 1985, relegation in 1986, promotion in 1989, relegation in 1991, and finally promotion in 1994.

In 1981, the club was given further support from the municipal council, when NEC's professional and amateur sides separated. This did not prevent the club's bankruptcy in 1987. NEC continued to exist only after 80% of creditors waived their claims.

New chairman Henk van de Water formed a sponsors' club to raise funds which started to gather momentum. By the mid-1990s, NEC was on the way up again. In 1995, the club clung on to a place in the Eredivisie by the skin of their teeth. In 1998, it surprised many with an eighth-place finish. Its financial situation had improved and attendance numbers rose gradually, up to an average of 10,000 spectators.

==== Cup finals ====
NEC has reached the final of the KNVB Cup six times. Going into the 1973 final, the club was the overwhelming favorite. At Rotterdam's De Kuip against NAC Breda, things went completely wrong for the Nijmegen club, with NAC coming away 2–0 winners, amidst claims of infighting and disagreements with the manager.

In 1983, NEC unexpectedly reached the Cup Final despite having been relegated that season, but fell 3–1 to the league champions Ajax – the third goal being scored by Johan Cruyff in his final game for the club.

In the 1993–94 season, the club surprised many by reaching the final despite playing in the Eerste Divisie, defeating Ajax 2–1 away from home in the semi-final, before losing 2–1 to Feyenoord in the final at De Kuip.

In 2000, the club's centenary year, it reached the final for the fourth time. The match against Roda JC would end in disappointment for the 20,000 fans who made the trip; NEC lost the match 2–0. The club reached the finale again for the fifth time in 2024 and lost again against Feyenoord (1-0).

In 2026 the club reached the finale for the sixth time after defeating PSV Eindhoven at home with 3-2. In the final they lost against AZ Alkmaar (5-1).

==== NEC in the Cup Winners' Cup ====
In 1983, during the darkest period of the club's history, the club played a match which many see as a highlight of the club's history: a match played in the European Cup Winners' Cup against Barcelona, while NEC was little more than a mid-table second-tier team.

In the spring, NEC had lost the cup-final against Ajax and were also relegated. Because the Amsterdam-based side had also been crowned champion of the Eredivisie, NEC qualified for UEFA competition while in the second-tier.

In the first round of the Cup Winners' Cup, NEC narrowly defeated Norway's Brann, 2–1 on aggregate. A few days later, the draw was completed for the second round, which pitted the superstars of Barcelona – with both Bernd Schuster and Diego Maradona – against the small Dutch outfit. Both players were injured for the tie, though there was still excitement for the fans at the Goffertstadion – NEC raced into a 2–0 lead after 44 minutes, with goals from Anton Janssen and Michel Mommertz, though the Blaugrana would hit back, winning the game 3–2, and strolled to a 2–0 victory at Camp Nou in the second leg.

=== 2003–2012: NEC in Europe ===
29 May 2003 marked a historic day for NEC. Following a late strike from Jaromír Šimr against RKC Waalwijk, NEC finished fifth in the Eredivisie. For the first time in the club's history, NEC qualified for the UEFA Cup through their league position. This led to unprecedented scenes with jubilant fans invading the pitch. Similar scenes occurred in the city centre with over 25,000 people celebrating.

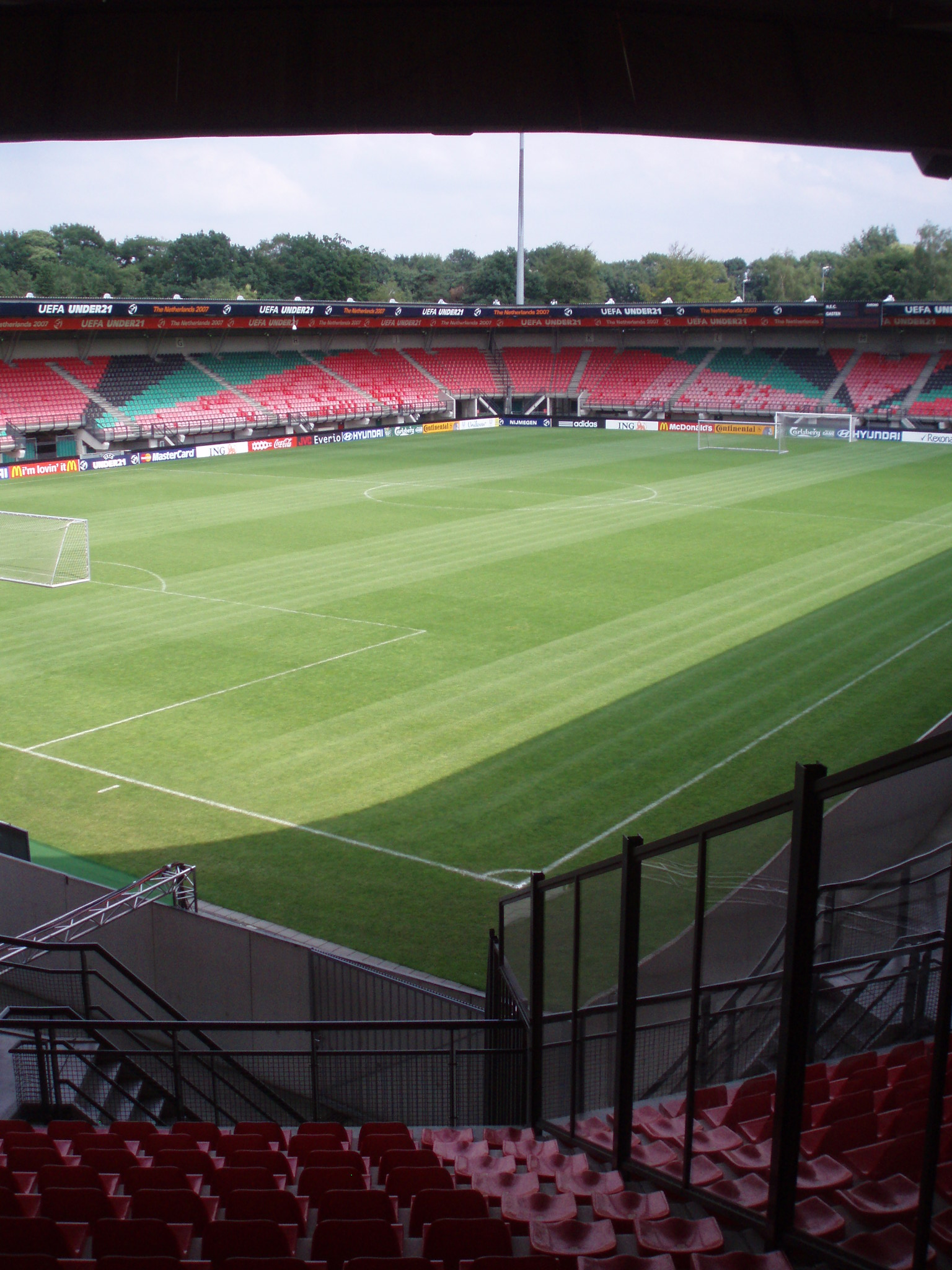
Stadium de Goffert in 2008.

The European run was short, because NEC was knocked out by the Polish club Wisla Krakow in the first round of the 2003-04 UEFA Cup.

In the 2007–08 Eredivisie season, NEC qualified for European competition again, despite a disappointing first half of the season, when the club found itself in 17th place at the winter break. However, there was a remarkable turnaround. From January, NEC improved their form and finished eighth place in the league. This position secured participation in the UEFA Cup play-offs, which they won, beating Roda JC, Groningen, and NAC Breda. With 31 undefeated matches in a row and with a 6–0 home victory at NAC Breda the highlight of the turnaround, NEC achieved European qualification once again.

The next season they continued to find more success following early rounds of the 2008-09 UEFA Cup. In the first round, the club defeated Dinamo București over two ties. After a 1–0 home win, NEC drew 0–0 in Romania to reach the group stage. They were then drawn against Tottenham Hotspur, Udinese, Spartak Moscow, and Dinamo Zagreb. They started poorly, with narrow defeats to both Dinamo Zagreb and Tottenham Hotspur – meaning they were bottom of the group and almost out of the competition with only 2 games left to play. After a 2–1 victory against Spartak Moscow in Russia with a goal from Lasse Schöne, NEC played their last match in Nijmegen against Udinese. To advance, NEC had to win and hope that other results went their way. Tottenham were trailing Spartak Moscow at half time, while NEC were being held at 0–0 by Udinese. In the 2nd half, however, Tottenham scored twice to eventually draw 2–2 against Spartak and goals from Collins John and Jhon van Beukering gave NEC a 2–0 victory, and they qualified for the knockout round.

The round of 32 of the UEFA Cup saw NEC drawn against Bundesliga side Hamburger SV. The run ended when the Germans won 3–0 in Nijmegen and 1–0 in Hamburg. NEC supporters were subsequently complimented in Europe by Franz Beckenbauer, who said he had never witnessed such great support from away supporters.

=== 2013–present: Relegations and promotions ===
At the end of the 2013–14 season, NEC prevented automatic relegation by holding Ajax to a 2–2 draw in Amsterdam on the last matchday with a brace from Alireza Jahanbakhsh. However, in the following relegation play-offs, NEC lost 4–1 on aggregate to Eerste Divisie's 3rd placed Sparta Rotterdam and was relegated to the second tier of Dutch football, ending a 20-year run in the top flight.

They bounced back however at the first attempt after beating Sparta 1–0 on 3 April 2015 to clinch the Eerste Divisie title with six games left. On 28 May 2017, NEC was relegated again after two years in the Eredivisie after losing 5–1 on aggregate against NAC Breda.

They reached the promotion play-offs in both the 2017–18 and 2018–19 seasons, but lost in the semi-finals on both occasions to FC Emmen and RKC Waalwijk. For the 2019–20 season, the club took the unusual step of appointing three head coaches: Adrie Bogers, Rogier Meijer and Francois Gesthuizen – the club finished in eighth place, which would have granted them a place in the play-offs, but due to the ongoing COVID-19 pandemic in the Netherlands, there was no promotion or relegation between Eredivisie and Eerste Divisie.

In May 2021, the club once again achieved promotion to the Eredivisie after beating NAC Breda 2–1 in the final of the promotion/relegation play-offs.

On 17 May 2026, NEC beat Go Ahead Eagles to finish their best ever Eredivisie season in 3rd place, qualifying for the Champions League preliminary phase in the process.

== Stadium ==
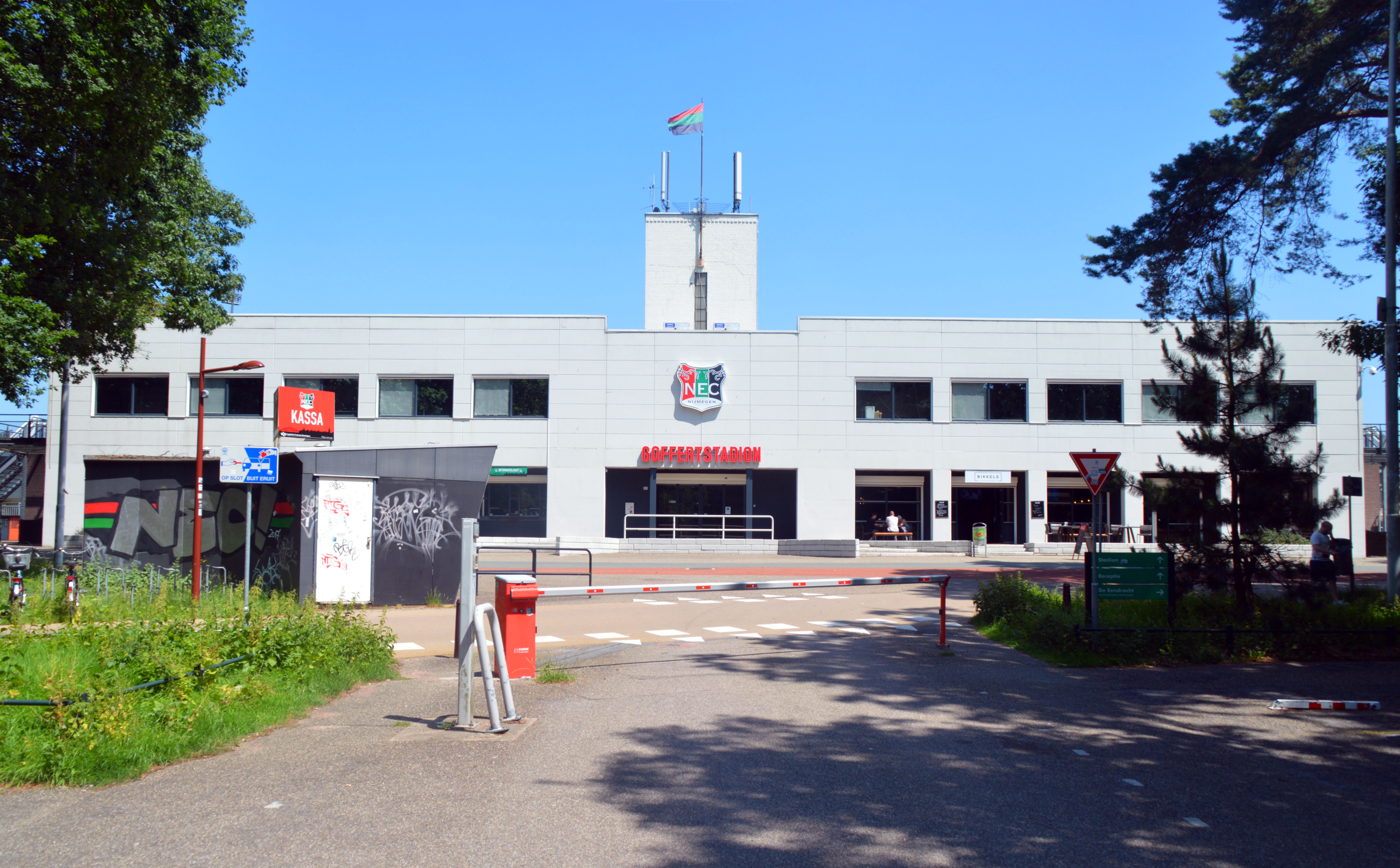
Stadion de Goffert

In the early years of NEC's existence, the club played at various grounds around the city, most notably at Hazenkampseweg.

The club's current home, Goffertstadion, was opened in 1939 by Prince Bernhard of the Netherlands. It had been constructed by thousands of the city's unemployed, during a time of compulsory employment. At the time of its completion it was the third highest capacity stadium in the Netherlands, after Ajax's Olympic Stadium and De Kuip in Rotterdam.

The Gofferstadion was a project by the municipal council, but upon completion both local clubs Quick 1888 and NEC refused to play there, as both had their own stadiums and did not want to pay rent for De Goffert. It therefore took until 1942 for the first match to be played, after NEC's home ground was damaged during the Second World War and the club permanently moved to De Goffert in 1945.

In 1992 the club purchased the stadium from the municipal council for the symbolic sum of 1 guilder. The stadium was renovated in the late 1990s, with an increased capacity of 12,500, opening with a friendly match between NEC and RSC Anderlecht, which the home side won 3–1.

On 17 October 2021, the away stand collapsed after a match between NEC and rivals Vitesse. Nobody was seriously injured.

=== International matches ===
Goffertstadion has hosted various senior men's international matches.

Date	Result			Competition
3 September 1975	Netherlands	2–0	Finland	UEFA Euro 1976 qualification
31 August 1977	Netherlands	4–0	Iceland	FIFA World Cup 1978 qualification
20 September 1978	Netherlands	3-0	Iceland	UEFA Euro 1980 qualification
6 September 2006	Israel	4–1	Andorra	UEFA Euro 2008 qualification
13 November 2017	Venezuela	0–1	Iran	International friendly

== Kit and colours ==
=== Club colours ===
Upon the merger of NVV and Eendracht, the club played in black shirts with a green and red band across the chest. However the club's traditional shirt is known as the Balkenshirt, consisting of a red shirt with a green chestband with black trim. During the 2000s, other variations of the club's colours were worn, such as a quartered design in 2004–05 and various half-and-half designs. In 2016 NEC's board allowed a controversial fan vote on whether to restore the classic chest band, which passed with a slim majority.

=== Kit suppliers and shirt sponsors ===
Period	Kit manufacturer	Shirt sponsor
1977–1980	Adidas	none
1980–1981	Pony	none
1981–1982	Le Coq Sportif	none
1982–1985	Le Coq Sportif	Daisy
1985–1994	none	VGZ
1994–1995	Hummel	Mephisto Schoenen
1995–1997	Puma	BNN
1997–2001	Puma	Plus Integration
2001–2004	Fila	CSS
2004–2005	Lotto	Setpoint
2005–2006	Lotto	Telfort
2006–2007	Lotto	Jiba Vakanties
2007–2008	Nike	Jiba Vakanties
2008–2011	Nike	Curaçao
2011–2012	Jako	Flynth
2012–2014	Jako	Scholten Awater
2014–2015	Warrior	Scholten Awater
2015–2016	Patrick	Scholten Awater
2016–2017	Patrick	Energie Flex
2017–2018	Legea	Energie Flex
2018–2023	Legea	Klok Groep
2023–2024	Robey	Klok Groep
2024–	Robey	Nexperia

== Club culture ==
=== Rivalries ===
Vitesse are NEC's archrivals. The two clubs share a long history together and they contest the Gelderse Derby (Derby of Gelderland), a confrontation between the two largest cities of the province of Gelderland, Arnhem and Nijmegen, two cities with major differences in attitude and culture. Since 1813, Arnhem has been the capital of Gelderland and is historically based on finance and trade, perceived as an office city with modern buildings. Nijmegen, on the other hand, is predominantly a workers' city, with middle and high-income groups in the minority.

The two cities are just 24 kilometers apart, resulting in an intense crosstown rivalry. The meeting between the two teams is still considered to be one of the biggest matches of the season.

De Graafschap are also considered a rival, and games between them are known as the Kleine Gelderse Derby (Little Gelderland Derby) but these matches are not as loaded with the tension and rivalry of those with Vitesse.

Statistics
Competition	Matches	Wins		Draws	Goals	
Competition	Matches	Vitesse	N.E.C.	Draws	Vitesse	N.E.C.
Eredivisie	57	22	19	16	69	61
Eerste divisie	14	2	6	6	18	27
Tweede divisie	4	0	3	1	3	9
Eerste klasse	8	1	6	1	9	23
Tweede klasse	4	2	1	1	7	5
KNVB Cup	5	0	3	2	3	9
Play-offs	6	4	1	1	9	4
Total	98	31	39	28	118	138

Last two results
Venue	Date	Competition	Vitesse	N.E.C.
De Goffert	1 October 2023	Eredivisie	3	1
GelreDome	7 April 2024	Eredivisie	0	3

=== Mascot ===
Since 2007, the club's mascot has been Bikkel, a Roman legionary, with a sword and shield, a reference to the Roman history of the city of Nijmegen. The name Bikkel reportedly refers to the nickname given to former player and coach Ron de Groot, who spent his whole career at the club.

== Players ==
=== First team squad ===
As of 8 October 2026

Note: Flags indicate national team as defined under FIFA eligibility rules; some limited exceptions apply. Players may hold more than one non-FIFA nationality.

No.	Pos.	Nation	Player
1	GK	ESP	Gonzalo Crettaz
3	DF	NED	Philippe Sandler
4	DF	NED	Perr Schuurs
5	MF	NED	Mitchel Bakker
6	MF	CRO	Darko Nejašmić
7	FW	TUR	Emre Mor
8	MF	NOR	Isak Hansen-Aarøen
9	MF	SUR	Tjaronn Chery
10	FW	SRB	Dušan Tadić
11	MF	ISL	Willum Þór Willumsson
12	GK	AUT	Nikolas Polster
14	FW	NED	Kaj Sierhuis
17	DF	NED	Bram Nuytinck
18	MF	GER	Dennis Geiger
19	FW	MAR	Adam Tahaui
20	MF	FRA	Noé Lebreton

No.	Pos.	Nation	Player
21	DF	DEN	Tobias Storm
22	DF	TUR	Ahmetcan Kaplan
24	DF	CUW	Deveron Fonville
26	MF	NED	Sam de Laat
30	FW	NED	Bryan Linssen
34	FW	NED	Kevin Kers
35	MF	CPV	Jamiro Monteiro
36	GK	NED	Freek Entius
37	MF	NED	Merijn van de Wiel
38	GK	NED	Joep Geneste
42	DF	NED	Yassin Moslih
66	DF	GER	Almugera Kabar (on loan from Borussia Dortmund)
73	DF	POR	Gabriel Brás (on loan from Porto B)
77	FW	NED	Ayodele Thomas
99	FW	DEN	Clement Bischoff (on loan from Red Bull Salzburg)

=== Out on loan ===
Note: Flags indicate national team as defined under FIFA eligibility rules; some limited exceptions apply. Players may hold more than one non-FIFA nationality.

No.	Pos.	Nation	Player
—	DF	NED	Yousri Sbai (at Jong Utrecht until 30 June 2027)

=== Youth/reserves squad ===
Note: Flags indicate national team as defined under FIFA eligibility rules; some limited exceptions apply. Players may hold more than one non-FIFA nationality.

No.	Pos.	Nation	Player
—	GK	NED	Freek Entius
—	DF	NED	Vince Schuurman
—	DF	NED	Jamil Milop
—	DF	NED	Raf Braitman
—	DF	NED	Douwe Vernooij
—	DF	CUW	Jillian Bernardina
—	DF	NED	Jahlani Fonteni
—	MF	NED	Omar Jamil

No.	Pos.	Nation	Player
—	MF	NED	Tijn Vergeldt
—	MF	NED	Konstantinos Siontis
—	MF	NED	Kelechi Idegwu
—	MF	NED	Koen Douglas
—	FW	NED	Ayman Belgadi
—	FW	NED	Kevin Kers
—	FW	EGY	Amir Saleh
—	FW	NED	Jim Croqué
—	FW	ARU	Conner van Kilsdonk

== Former players ==
=== National team players ===
The following players were called up to represent their national teams in international football and received caps during their tenure with N.E.C.:

Angola

- (Angola) Dominique Kivuvu (2006–2010)

Aruba

- (Aruba) Gregor Breinburg (2014–2018)

Australia

- (Australia) Brett Holman (2006–2008)
- (Australia) Brad Jones (2016)

Austria

- (Austria) Jakob Jantscher (2013–2014)

Belgium

- (Belgium) Björn Vleminckx (2009–2011)

Bonaire

- (Bonaire) Denyor Cicilia (2023–2026)

Bosnia & Herzegovina

- (Bosnia and Herzegovina) Dario Đumić (2016–2017)

Burundi

- (Burundi) Saidi Ntibazonkiza (2006–2010)

Cape Verde

- (Cape Verde) **Jamiro Monteiro (2026–present)**

Curaçao

- (Curaçao) Suently Alberto (2017–2018)
- (Curaçao) **Deveron Fonville (2025–present)**
- (Curaçao) Rangelo Janga (2020–2021)

Denmark

- (Denmark) Kevin Conboy (2011–2015)
- (Denmark) John Frandsen (1973–1975)
- (Denmark) Dennis Rommedahl (2008–2009)
- (Denmark) Lasse Schöne (2008–2012; 2021–2025)
- (Denmark) Niki Zimling (2010–2011)

DR Congo

- (Democratic Republic of the Congo) Jonathan Okita (2018–2022)

Finland

- (Finland) Antti Sumiala (1995–1997)

Hungary

- (Hungary) Gábor Babos (2005–2013)
- (Hungary) Krisztián Vadócz (2007–2008; 2011–2012)

Iceland

- (Iceland) Hannes Þór Halldórsson (2015–2016)
- (Iceland) Victor Pálsson (2013–2014)
- (Iceland) **Willum Þór Willumsson (2026–present)**

Indonesia

- (Indonesia) Calvin Verdonk (2022–2025)

Iran

- (Iran) Alireza Jahanbakhsh (2013–2015)

Israel

- (Israel) Eli Dasa (2025–2026)

Japan

- (Japan) Kōki Ogawa (2023–2026)
- (Japan) Kodai Sano (2023–2026)

Luxembourg

- (Luxembourg) Yvandro Borges Sanches (2024)

Martinique

- (Martinique) Steeven Langil (2017–2018)

Morocco

- (Morocco) Youssef El Akchaoui (2006–2010)
- (Morocco) Souffian El Karouani (2019–2023)

Netherlands

- (Netherlands) Jasper Cillessen (2010–2011; 2022–2024; 2025–2026)
- (Netherlands) Romano Denneboom (2004–2007)
- (Netherlands) Theo de Jong (1971–1972)
- (Netherlands) Wim Lakenberg (1936–1948)
- (Netherlands) Pauke Meijers (1950–1954; 1962–1967)
- (Netherlands) Jan Peters (1971–1977; 1986–1988)

North Macedonia

- (North Macedonia) Georgi Hristov (2000–2003)
- (North Macedonia) Dževdet Šainovski (1997–1999)

Paraguay

- (Paraguay) Édgar Barreto (2004–2007; 2020–2022)

Poland

- (Poland) Andrzej Niedzielan (2004–2007)

Serbia

- (Serbia) **Dušan Tadić (2026–present)**

Sint Maarten

- (Sint Maarten) Sergio Hughes (2019–2022)

Slovakia

- (Slovakia) Samuel Štefánik (2013–2014)

Suriname

- (Suriname) **Tjaronn Chery (2025–present)**
- (Suriname) Virgil Misidjan (2025–2026)

Sweden

- (Sweden) Jordan Larsson (2017–2018)
- (Sweden) Jonas Olsson (2005–2008)

Venezuela

- (Venezuela) Christian Santos (2014–2016)

- Players in bold actively play for N.E.C. and for their respective national teams. Years in brackets indicate career span with N.E.C.

=== National team players by Confederation ===
Member associations are listed in order of most to least amount of current and former N.E.C. players represented Internationally

Total national team players by confederation
Confederation	Total	(Nation) Association
AFC	6	Australia (2), Japan (2), Indonesia (1), Iran (1)
CAF	6	Morocco (2), Angola (1), Burundi (1), Cape Verde (1), (Democratic Republic of the Congo) DR Congo (1)
CONCACAF	9	Curaçao (3), Suriname (2), Aruba (1), Bonaire (1), Martinique (1), Sint Maarten (1)
CONMEBOL	2	Paraguay (1), Venezuela (1)
OFC	0	
UEFA	29	Netherlands (6), Denmark (5), Iceland (3), Hungary (2), North Macedonia (2), Sweden (2), Austria (1), Belgium (1), (Bosnia and Herzegovina) Bosnia & Herzegovina (1), Finland (1), Israel (1), Luxembourg (1), Poland (1), Serbia (1), Slovakia (1)

== Players in international tournaments ==
The following is a list of N.E.C. players who have competed in international tournaments, including the FIFA World Cup, UEFA European Championship, AFC Asian Cup, Africa Cup of Nations and the Copa América. To this date no N.E.C. players have participated in the CONCACAF Gold Cup, or the OFC Nations Cup while playing for NEC Nijmegen.

Cup	Players
(Socialist Federal Republic of Yugoslavia) UEFA Euro 1976	(Netherlands) Jan Peters
(Peru) 2004 Copa América	(Paraguay) Édgar Barreto
(Germany) 2006 FIFA World Cup	(Paraguay) Édgar Barreto
(Indonesia) (Malaysia) (Thailand) (Vietnam) 2007 AFC Asian Cup	(Australia) Brett Holman
(Venezuela) 2007 Copa América	(Paraguay) Édgar Barreto
(Poland) (Ukraine) UEFA Euro 2012	(Denmark) Lasse Schöne
(Brazil) 2014 FIFA World Cup	(Iran) Alireza Jahanbakhsh
(Australia) 2015 AFC Asian Cup	(Iran) Alireza Jahanbakhsh
(United States) 2016 Copa América	(Venezuela) Christian Santos
(Cameroon) 2021 Africa Cup of Nations	(Morocco) Souffian El Karouani
(Canada) (Mexico) (United States) 2026 FIFA World Cup	(Curaçao) Deveron Fonville (Japan) Kōki Ogawa

== Staff ==
Position	Staff
Manager	(Netherlands) Dick Schreuder
Assistant manager	(Saudi Arabia) Ahmed Abdulla
Assistant manager	(Bosnia and Herzegovina) Haris Medunjanin
Assistant manager	(Netherlands) Nick van der Velden
Goalkeeping coach	(Netherlands) Anton Scheutjens
First-team coach	(Netherlands) Muslu Nalbantoğlu
Data analyst	(Netherlands) Robin Huntjens
Performance manager	(Netherlands) Nick Segers
Club doctor	(Netherlands) Jeroen Mooren
Head of medical services	(Netherlands) Han Tijshen
Physiotherapist	(Netherlands) Reinier Looij
Physiotherapist	(Netherlands) Wouter van Ewijk
Masseur	(Netherlands) Tjeerd Miltenburg
Kitman	(Netherlands) Dave Kelders

== Former coaches ==
Source.

- (Hungary) Ferenz György (1923–24)
- (England) Smith (1929–30)
- (Germany) Claus Uber (1931–32)
- (Austria) Richard Longin (1932–33)
- (Netherlands) Fons Lodenstijn (1933–36)
- (Netherlands) Coen Delsen (1936–37)
- (Netherlands) Bertus Schoester (1937–39)
- (England) Bill Julian (1939–40)
- (Netherlands) Bertus Schoester (1940–42)
- (England) George Charlton (1947–49)
- (Netherlands) Jan Bijl (1949–54)
- (Netherlands) Coen Delsen (1954–56)
- (Germany) Ferdi Silz (1956–57)
- (Netherlands) Rein ter Horst (1957–58)
- (Netherlands) Fons Lodenstijn (interim) (1958)
- (Netherlands) Wim Groenendijk (1958–60)
- (Netherlands) Joop de Busser (1960–61)
- (Netherlands) Jan Remmers (1961–70)
- (Netherlands) Wiel Coerver (1 July 1970 – 30 June 1973)
- (Netherlands) Meg de Jong (1973–74)
- (Netherlands) Piet de Visser (1 July 1974 – 30 June 1976)
- (Netherlands) Hans Croon (1976–78)
- (Netherlands) Leen Looijen (1978–81)
- (Netherlands) Pim van de Meent (1 July 1981 – 30 June 1985)
- (Hungary) Sandor Popovics (1985–87)
- (Netherlands) Leen Looijen (1987–91)
- (Netherlands) Jan Pruijn (1 July 1991 – 30 June 1993)
- (Netherlands) Cees van Kooten (1 July 1994 – 8 December 1995)
- (Netherlands) Wim Koevermans (8 December 1995 – 3 March 1997)
- (Netherlands) Leen Looijen (interim) (3 March 1997 – 30 June 1997)
- (Scotland) Jimmy Calderwood (1 July 1997 – 29 December 1999)
- (Netherlands) Ron de Groot (interim) (29 December 1999 – 30 June 2000)
- (Netherlands) Johan Neeskens (1 July 2000 – 13 December 2004)
- (Netherlands) Cees Lok (13 December 2004 – 19 December 2005)
- (Netherlands) Ron de Groot (interim) (19 December 2005 – 30 June 2006)
- (Netherlands) Mario Been (1 July 2006 – 30 June 2009)
- (Netherlands) Dwight Lodeweges (1 July 2009 – 27 October 2009)
- (Netherlands) Wim Rip & (Netherlands) Wilfried Brookhuis (interim) (27 October 2009 – 16 November 2009)
- (Netherlands) Wiljan Vloet (16 November 2009 – 30 June 2011)
- (Netherlands) Alex Pastoor (1 July 2011 – 19 August 2013)
- (Netherlands) Ron de Groot & (Netherlands) Wilfried Brookhuis (interim) (19 August 2013 – 27 August 2013)
- (Netherlands) Anton Janssen (27 August 2013 – 22 May 2014)
- (Netherlands) Ruud Brood (1 July 2014 – 27 May 2015)
- (Netherlands) Ernest Faber (1 July 2015 – 30 June 2016)
- (Germany) Peter Hyballa (1 July 2016 – 24 April 2017)
- (Netherlands) Ron de Groot (interim) (25 April 2017 – 30 June 2017)
- (Netherlands) Adrie Bogers (1 July 2017 – 1 January 2018)
- (Netherlands) Pepijn Lijnders (2 January 2018 – 17 May 2018)
- (Netherlands) Jack de Gier (1 July 2018 – 2 April 2019)
- (Netherlands) Ron de Groot, (Netherlands) Adrie Bogers & (Netherlands) Rogier Meijer (interim) (3 April 2019 – 2 June 2019)
- (Netherlands) Rogier Meijer (3 June 2020 –1 July 2025)
- (Netherlands) Dick Schreuder (1 July 2025 –present)

== Honours ==
- Eerste Divisie
  - Winners: 1974–75, 2014–15
  - Promoted: 1966–67, 1984–85, 1988–89, 1993–94, 2020–21
- Tweede Divisie
  - Winners: 1963–64
- KNVB Cup
  - Runners-up: 1972–73, 1982–83, 1993–94, 1999–2000, 2023–24, 2025–26

=== Results ===
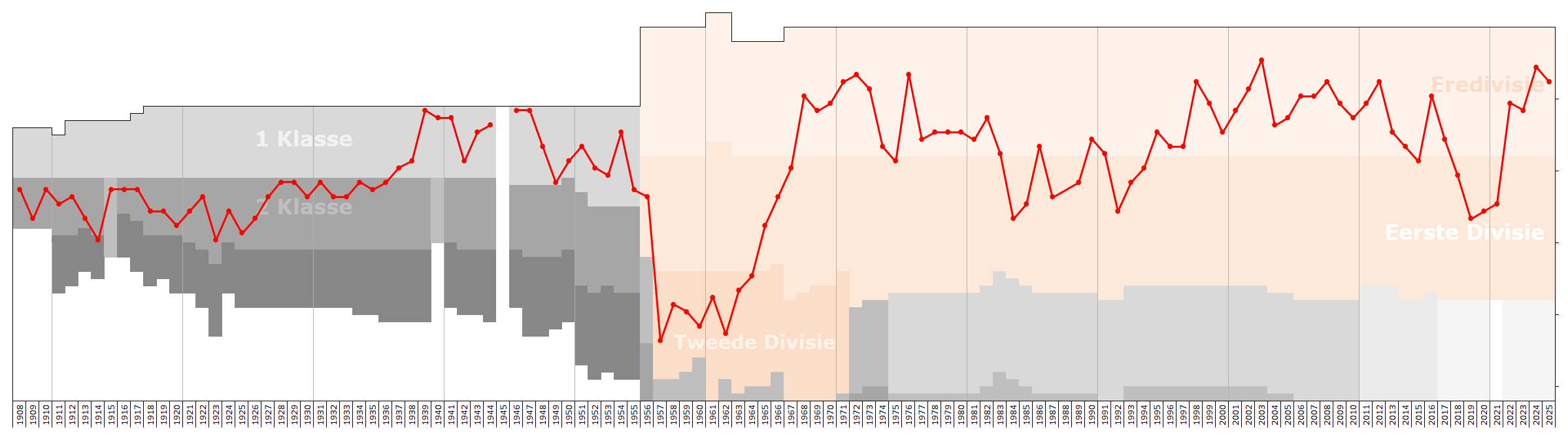
Historical chart of league performance

Below is a table with NEC's domestic results since the introduction of professional football in 1955.

Domestic Results since 1956
Domestic league	League result	Qualification to	KNVB Cup season	Cup result
2022–23 Eredivisie	12th	–	2022–23	Round of 16
2021–22 Eredivisie	11th	–	2021–22	quarter-final
2020–21 Eerste Divisie	7th	Eredivisie (winning promotion/releg. play-offs)	2020–21	quarter-final
2019–20 Eerste Divisie	8th (Note: Season abandoned due to COVID-19 pandemic in the Netherlands)	–	2019–20	first round
2018–19 Eerste Divisie	9th	promotion/relegation play-offs: no promotion	2018–19	round of 32
2017–18 Eerste Divisie	3rd	promotion/relegation play-offs: no promotion	2017–18	round of 16
2016–17 Eredivisie	16th	Eerste Divisie (losing prom./releg. play-offs)	2016–17	first round
2015–16 Eredivisie	10th	–	2015–16	round of 16
2014–15 Eerste Divisie	1st	Eredivisie (promotion)	2014–15	round of 16
2013–14 Eredivisie	17th	Eerste Divisie (losing prom./releg. play-offs)	2013–14	semi-final
2012–13 Eredivisie	15th		2012–13	second round
2011–12 Eredivisie	8th	–	2011–12	quarter-final
2010–11 Eredivisie	11th	–	2010–11	third round
2009–10 Eredivisie	13th	–	2009–10	quarter-final
2008–09 Eredivisie	11th	–	2008–09	quarter-final
2007–08 Eredivisie	8th	–	2007–08	round of 16
2006–07 Eredivisie	10th	–	2006–07	third round
2005–06 Eredivisie	10th	–	2005–06	round of 16
2004–05 Eredivisie	13th	–	2004–05	third round
2003–04 Eredivisie	14th	–	2003–04	third round
2002–03 Eredivisie	5th	–	2002–03	third round
2001–02 Eredivisie	9th	–	2001–02	group stage
2000–01 Eredivisie	12th	–	2000–01	round of 16
1999–2000 Eredivisie	15th	–	1999–00	runner-up
1998–99 Eredivisie	11th	–	1998–99	second round
1997–98 Eredivisie	8th	–	1997–98	round of 16
1996–97 Eredivisie	17th	(surviving promotion/relegation play-offs)	1996–97	round of 16
1995–96 Eredivisie	17th	(surviving promotion/relegation play-offs)	1995–96	second round
1994–95 Eredivisie	15th	–	1994–95	round of 16
1993–94 Eerste Divisie	2nd	Eredivisie (prom./releg. play-offs: promotion)	1993–94	runner-up
1992–93 Eerste Divisie	4th	(prom./releg. play-offs: no promotion)	1992–93	second round
1991–92 Eerste Divisie	8th	–	1991–92	third round
1990–91 Eredivisie	18nd	Eerste Divisie (relegation)	1990–91	second round
1989–90 Eredivisie	16th	(prom./releg. play-offs: no relegation)	1989–90	third round
1988–89 Eerste Divisie	4th	Eredivisie (promotion competition: promotion)	1988–89	first round
1987–88 Eerste Divisie	5th	–	1987–88	third round
1986–87 Eerste Divisie	6th	(promotion competition: no promotion)	1986–87	first round
1985–86 Eredivisie	17th	Eerste Divisie (relegation)	1985–86	semi-final
1984–85 Eerste Divisie	7th	Eredivisie(promotion competition: promotion)	1984–85	first round
1983–84 Eerste Divisie	9th	–	1983–84	quarter-final
1982–83 Eredivisie	18th	Eerste Divisie (relegation)	1982–83	runner-up
1981–82 Eredivisie	13th	–	1981–82	quarter-final
1980–81 Eredivisie	16th	–	1980–81	second round
1979–80 Eredivisie	15th	–	1979–80	third round
1978–79 Eredivisie	15th	–	1978–79	second round
1977–78 Eredivisie	15th	–	1977–78	second round
1976–77 Eredivisie	16th	–	1976–77	second round
1975–76 Eredivisie	7th	–	1975–76	first round
1974–75 Eerste Divisie	1st	Eredivisie (promotion)	1974–75	first round
1973–74 Eredivisie	17th	Eerste Divisie (relegation)	1973–74	third round
1972–73 Eredivisie	9th	–	1972–73	runner-up
1971–72 Eredivisie	7th	–	1971–72	quarter-final
1970–71 Eredivisie	8th	–	1970–71	semi-final
1969–70 Eredivisie	11th	–	1969–70	first round
1968–69 Eredivisie	12th	–	1968–69	quarter-final
1967–68 Eredivisie	10th	–	1967–68	second round
1966–67 Eerste Divisie	2nd	Eredivisie (promotion)	1966–67	first round
1965–66 Eerste Divisie	6th	–	1965–66	group stage
1964–65 Eerste Divisie	10th	–	1964–65	first round
1963–64 Tweede Divisie B	1st	Eerste Divisie (winning promotion play-off)	1963–64	third round
1962–63 Tweede Divisie A	3rd	(promotion competition: no promotion)	1962–63	semi-final
1961–62 Tweede Divisie	9th	–	1961–62	first round
1960–61 Tweede Divisie	4th	(promotion competition: no promotion)	1960–61	group stage
1959–60 Tweede Divisie A	8th	–	not held	not held
1958–59 Tweede Divisie B	6th	–	1958–59	fourth round
1957–58 Tweede Divisie B	5th	–	1957–58	first round
1956–57 Tweede Divisie B	10th	–	1956–57	"did not participate"

== NEC in European competition ==
Season	Competition	Round	Country	Club	Home	Away	Aggregate
1969–70	Intertoto Cup	Group stage	(Slovakia)	Žilina	1–1	1–2	2–3
1969–70	Intertoto Cup	Group stage	(Sweden)	Örebro SK	0–0	1–1	1–1
1969–70	Intertoto Cup	Group stage	(Switzerland)	Bellinzona	2–0	3–3	5–3
1978–79	Intertoto Cup	Group stage	(Belgium)	Royal Antwerp	0–2	3–2	3–4
1978–79	Intertoto Cup	Group stage	(Germany)	Duisburg	4–2	0–6	4–8
1978–79	Intertoto Cup	Group stage	(France)	Bordeaux	1–2	2–4	3–6
1983–84	Cup Winners' Cup	First round	(Norway)	Brann	1–1	1–0	2–1
1983–84	Cup Winners' Cup	Second round	(Spain)	Barcelona	2–3	0–2	2–5
1986–87	Intertoto Cup	Group stage	(Germany)	Fortuna Düsseldorf	4–3	0–3	4–6
1986–87	Intertoto Cup	Group stage	(Hungary)	MTK Budapest	0–3	2–2	2–5
1986–87	Intertoto Cup	Group stage	(Belgium)	RFC Liege	0–1	1–1	1–2
2003–04	UEFA Cup	First round	(Poland)	Wisła Kraków	1–2	1–2	2–4
2004–05	UEFA Intertoto Cup	Second round	(Republic of Ireland)	Cork City	0–0	0–1	0–1
2008–09	UEFA Cup	First round	(Romania)	Dinamo Bucharest	1–0	0–0	1–0
2008–09	UEFA Cup	Group stage	(Croatia)	Dinamo Zagreb	—N/a	2–3	3rd
2008–09	UEFA Cup	Group stage	(England)	Tottenham Hotspur	0–1	—N/a	3rd
2008–09	UEFA Cup	Group stage	(Russia)	Spartak Moscow	—N/a	2–1	3rd
2008–09	UEFA Cup	Group stage	(Italy)	Udinese	2–0	—N/a	3rd
2008–09	UEFA Cup	Round of 32	(Germany)	Hamburger SV	0–3	0–1	0–4
2026–27	UEFA Champions League	Third qualifying round	(Greece)	Olympiacos	2–1 (a.e.t.)	0–0	2–1
2026–27	UEFA Champions League	Play-off round	(Norway)	Bodø/Glimt	1–3	0–3	1–6
2026–27	UEFA Europa League (Transfer from CL)						
2026–27	UEFA Europa League (Transfer from CL)	League phase	(Italy)	Juventus	—N/a	0–5	
2026–27	UEFA Europa League (Transfer from CL)	League phase	(Bulgaria)	Levski Sofia	1-1	—N/a	
2026–27	UEFA Europa League (Transfer from CL)	League phase	(Croatia)	Dinamo Zagreb	—N/a	4-2	
2026–27	UEFA Europa League (Transfer from CL)	League phase	(Cyprus)	Omonia		—N/a	
2026–27	UEFA Europa League (Transfer from CL)	League phase	(France)	Stade Rennais		—N/a	
2026–27	UEFA Europa League (Transfer from CL)	League phase	(Armenia)	Ararat-Armenia	—N/a		
2026–27	UEFA Europa League (Transfer from CL)	League phase	(Portugal)	Benfica		—N/a	
2026–27	UEFA Europa League (Transfer from CL)	League phase	(Slovenia)	Celje	—N/a		

== Records and statistics ==
=== Attendance ===
- Record attendance: 22,000 v Ajax, Eredivisie, 6 May 1990
- Highest season average attendance: 12,379, 2009–10

=== Transfers ===
- Biggest Transfer fee paid: €2.5 million to Ajax for Ahmetcan Kaplan, 2026
- Biggest Transfer fee received: €14.5 million from PSV for Kodai Sano, 2026

=== Team records ===
- Biggest victory: 7–0 v FC Den Bosch, 3 November 1973
- Biggest defeat: 1–9 v Ajax, 5 November 1967
- Highest league finish: 3rd, 2025–26
- Most wins in a season: 16, 2025–26
- Most goals scored in a season: 100, 2014–15
- Fewest goals conceded in a season: 36, 1970–71

=== Individual records ===
- Most appearances: Sije Visser, 490
- Most goals: Frans Janssen, 126
- Most goals in a season: 23, Björn Vleminckx, 2010–11
- Most goals in a game: 4, Björn Vleminckx, NEC Nijmegen 5–0 Roda JC, 1 May 2011
- Most assists in a game: 4, Jeffrey Sarpong, NEC Nijmegen 4–2 NAC Breda, 12 February 2010
- Youngest goalscorer: Ferdi Kadioglu, 17 years, 23 days, 30 October 2016

== See also ==
- Dutch football league teams
- Goffertstadion
