= Darnell Bile =

French footballer (born 2005)

Personal information
- Full name: Darnell Eric Bile
- Date of birth: 28 October 2005 (age 21)
- Place of birth: Colombes, France
- Position: Forward

Team information
- Current team: Panserraikos
- Number: 18

Youth career
- 2011–2015: ES Colombienne
- 2015–2020: Boulogne-Billancourt
- 2020–2023: Saint-Étienne

Senior career*
Years	Team	Apps	(Gls)
2022	Saint-Étienne B	13	(1)
2022	Saint-Étienne	2	(0)
2024–2025	Asteras Tripolis	9	(0)
2026–	Panserraikos	2	(0)

International career^{‡}
2022	France U18	3	(1)
2024	France U20	2	(0)
- * Club domestic league appearances and goals as of 8 February 2026 ‡ National team caps and goals as of 18 November 2024

Darnell Eric Bile (born 28 October 2005) is a French professional footballer who plays as a forward for Super League Greece 2 club Panserraikos.

== Club career ==
Born in Colombes, Darnell Eric Bile joined the Saint-Étienne academy in 2020 from Boulogne-Billancourt.

Having impressed in an under-21 tournament in the pre-season, Bile made his professional debut for Saint-Étienne on the 27 August 2022, coming on as a substitute for Jean-Philippe Krasso, in a 2–2 away Ligue 2 draw against Valenciennes.

He also went on to play the following game, a 5-0 league win against Bastia, but after his trouble with the French Federation, he also was sidelined by his club for an undetermined period.

On 30 September 2024, Bile signed for Super League Greece club Asteras Tripolis.

== International career ==
Born in France, Bile holds French and Ivorian nationalities. He is a youth international for France, first receiving a call with the under-18 in September 2022 for the Tournoi de Limoges, with a 2005 generation that had just won the under-17 Euro.

He scored his first goal with France on 23 September against Scotland. However he made headlines for unfortunate reasons in the next encounter against Poland, as he was the fourth red-carded Frenchman in the second half, forcing the end of the game, and a win for the Polish side, that also won the tournament. Following the incident, Bile was suspended by the French Football Federation for 8 months.
