= Attila Herédi =

Association football player

Atilla Herédi
Personal information
- Full name: Atilla Herédi
- Date of birth: 2 January 1959 (age 67)
- Place of birth: Jánoshalma, Hungary
- Position: Defender

Youth career
- 1972-1979: Újpest FC

Senior career*
Years	Team	Apps	(Gls)
1979	Újpest FC	32	(0)
1979-1980	Ganz-MÁVAG SE		
1980-1990	Újpest FC	221	(20)
1990-1991	FC Haka	18	(2)

International career
1985-1988	Hungary	5	(0)

Managerial career
- 1997-2000: Újpesti TE (assistant)
- 2001-2002: Fehérvár FC (assistant)
- 2003-2004: Nyíregyháza Spartacus FC
- 2008-2009: Újpesti TE (assistant)
- 2009-2010: Vecsési FC
- 2010-2011: FC Tatabánya
- 2011-2012: Pápai FC (assistant)
- 2013: Jászapáti VSE
- Vác U21
- 2015-: Maglódi TC
- * Club domestic league appearances and goals

Attila Herédi (born 2 January 1959) is a former Hungarian professional footballer who played as a defender, later became a football coach. He was a member of the Hungary national football team.

== Career ==
In 1972 he started playing football for Újpest FC. He made his debut in the top flight in 1979 and then spent a year on loan at Ganz-MÁVAG SE. Between 1979 and 1990 he played 221 league matches and scored 20 goals. With Újpest he was a one-time Hungarian champion and three-time Magyar Kupa winner. In 1990, he continued his career with Finnish club FC Haka.

=== National team ===
Between 1985 and 1988 he played 5 times for the Hungary national football team.

=== As a coach ===
From 1997 to 2000 he was a coach at Újpesti TE, and from 2001 to 2002 at Fehérvár FC. From 2003 he coached Nyíregyháza Spartacus FC for one year. From 2008 he was again the coach of Újpesti TE, then he coached at Vecsési FC (2009-2010) and FC Tatabánya (2010-2011). From 2011 he coached at Pápai FC, and from 2013 he coached Jászapáti VSE and Vác U21. Since 2015, he has coached Maglódi TC.

== Honours ==
- Nemzeti Bajnokság I (NB I)
  - Champion: 1989-90
- Magyar Kupa (MNK)
  - Winner: 1982, 1983, 1987
- UEFA Cup Winners' Cup
  - Quarter-finalist: 1983-1984
- Individual
  - Hungarian Player of the Year: 1987
