= Philippe Garot =

Belgian footballer (1948–2023)

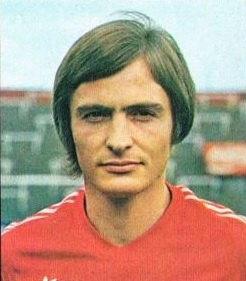

Personal information
- Date of birth: 30 November 1948
- Place of birth: Verviers, Belgium
- Date of death: 11 July 2023 (aged 74)
- Place of death: Waremme, Belgium
- Positions: Defender; forward

Senior career*
Years	Team	Apps	(Gls)
-1971	Verviétois		
1971–1972	Eupen		
1972–1974	RWDM		
1974–1980	Standard Liège		
1980–1984	Beveren		
1984–1986	RWDM		

International career
1977–1979	Belgium	2	(0)

Managerial career
- 1986–1987: Francs Borains
- 1987–1988: Mons
- 1988–1989: ASEC Mimosas
- 1989–1990: Seraing
- * Club domestic league appearances and goals

Philippe Garot (French: [filip ɡaʁo]; 30 November 1948 – 11 July 2023) was a Belgian football player and manager.

== Career ==
Garot won the league with K.S.K. Beveren in 1983.

== Death ==
Garot died on 11 July 2023, at the age of 74.
