= Jonker Boys =

Dutch football club

Voetbalvereniging Jonker Boys is an association football club based in Nijmegen. It was founded in 1968.
