= Jarmo Kujanpää =

Finnish footballer (born 1959)

Personal information
- Date of birth: 5 April 1959 (age 67)
- Place of birth: Ikaalinen, Finland
- Height: 1.75 m (5 ft 9 in)
- Position: Forward

Senior career*
| Years | Team | Apps | (Gls) |
| 1977–1989 | FC Haka | | |
| 1989–1990 | Pallo-Iirot | | |
| 1990–1991 | FC Haka | | |
- * Club domestic league appearances and goals

Jarmo Kujanpää (born 5 April 1959 in Ikaalinen) is a Finnish former professional footballer who played as a forward.
