= Cees Lok =

Dutch football manager and player (born 1966)

Personal information
- Date of birth: 18 August 1966 (age 60)
- Place of birth: Emmeloord, Netherlands
- Position: Defender

Youth career
- RWV
- Wageningen

Senior career*
Years	Team	Apps	(Gls)
1984–1988	Wageningen	117	(28)
1988–1998	NEC	230	(57)
Total		347	(85)

Managerial career
- 1999–2004: NEC (youth)
- 2004: NEC (assistant)
- 2004–2005: NEC
- 2006: NAC Breda
- 2006–2007: IJsselmeervogels
- 2007–2009: Jong Twente
- 2015: Bennekom
- * Club domestic league appearances and goals

Cees Lok (born 18 August 1966) is a Dutch former professional footballer and manager. He currently works as a technical manager.

== Playing career ==
Cees began his career at Wageningen before he entered service at NEC. There, he became a stable and highly acclaimed defender who would finally play 230 league games for the Nijmegen club. He managed to score 57 goals in these matches. Because of his height he was also often used as a striker at NEC. His final years there were marked by injuries. Following yet another return after a serious injury, he managed to score the winning goal against Feyenoord in his comeback match. As a player, he gained the nickname The Living Legend from the NEC supporters.

== Managerial career ==
=== NEC ===
After his playing career he remained under contract with NEC and he became the coach of the second team. After Johan Neeskens was fired as head coach at NEC in December 2004, Lok succeeded him, initially as caretaker coach. However, he completed the season successfully. On 10 May 2005, he then attained his Professional Football Coach Diploma, following an internship at both Arsenal and NEC.

After having been head coach of NEC for one year and despite the good performance of the club, he unexpectedly resigned from his post and left, due to differences in perspective between him and the board.

=== NAC and IJsselmeervogels ===
In January 2006, it was announced that Lok was appointed new coach of NAC Breda, who had sacked their manager Ton Lokhoff a few days before. Soon after his arrival, he had a clash with Pierre van Hooijdonk, who left to join Feyenoord in the winter break. When appointing Lok, NAC were already struggling at the bottom of the Eredivisie, but even under Lok were not able to break out of this position, and the club were forced to play promotion/relegation play-offs. Following a 0–0 draw in the first match of the play-offs against TOP Oss, Lok was dismissed less than four months after his appointment. The main reason, as indicated by the NAC board, was that the relationship between Lok and a number of players had been disrupted.

In October 2006, Lok was appointed as head coach at IJsselmeervogels in the Saturday Hoofdklasse. In his first season as coach, the club became champion in the Saturday Hoofdklasse B and general champion of Saturday amateurs.

=== Jong Twente ===
After turning down a job as head coach of Wisła Kraków, he began working as the head coach of the second team of Twente, Jong Twente, from the 2007–08 season. On 5 May 2008, Lok won the championship of the Beloften Eredivisie with Jong Twente. Two rounds before the end of the competition, his team could not be overtaken by the pursuing Jong Ajax. As a result, in the 2008–09 season, his team qualified for the KNVB Cup tournament.

=== Technical manager and analyst ===
In the summer of 2009, Lok left his position as coach of Jong Twente and succeeded Mohammed Allach as technical manager at the club. In this capacity, he worked with managers Steve McClaren, Michel Preud'homme and Co Adriaanse. Twente became Eredivisie champions for the first time in club history in 2010, with Lok active as technical manager.

In March 2015, Lok left Twente and started One Goal Sportmanagament with Jan Streuer, former Shakhtar Donetsk chief scout.

In July 2019, Ronald Koeman, as the Netherlands national team head coach, added Lok to his staff as chief analyst/scout to analyse players and teams for the upcoming UEFA Euro 2020.
