= Ron de Groot =

Dutch footballer and manager

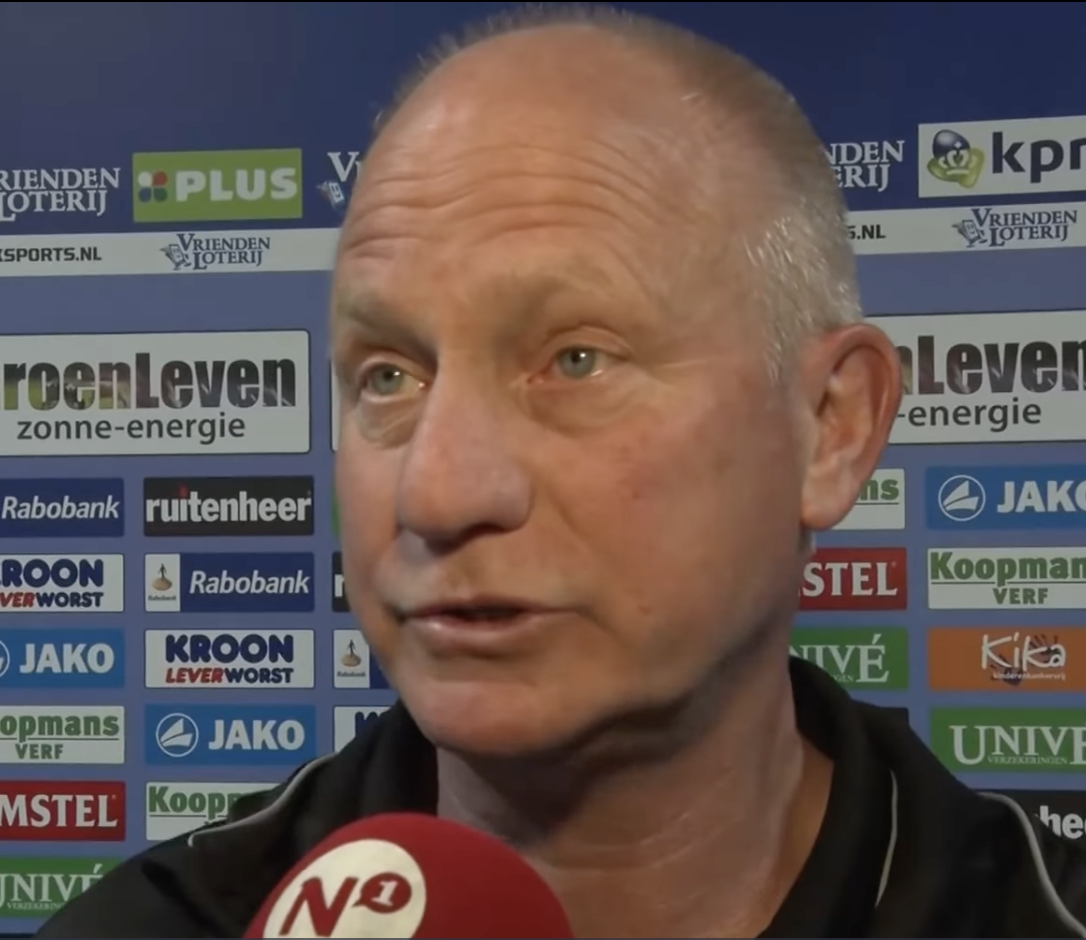

Personal information
- Full name: Ronnie de Groot
- Date of birth: 29 March 1960 (age 66)
- Place of birth: Nijmegen, Gelderland, Netherlands
- Position: Midfielder

Youth career
- SCH
- SV Blauw Wit
- NEC

Senior career*
Years	Team	Apps	(Gls)
1979–1987	NEC	197	(13)

Managerial career
- 1993–2016: NEC (assistant)
- 1999–2000: NEC (interim)
- 2005–06: NEC (interim)
- 2013: NEC (interim)
- 2017: NEC (interim)
- 2019: NEC (interim)
- 2020–2025: NEC (assistant)
- * Club domestic league appearances and goals

Ronnie "Ron" de Groot (Dutch pronunciation: [ˈrɔn(i) də ˈɣroːt]; born March 29, 1960) is a retired football midfielder from the Netherlands, who mainly played for NEC Nijmegen (1979–1987) during his professional career.

He played in the SCH, Blauw Wit en NEC youth teams before making his professional debut for NEC in 1979. He totalled 231 games for the club.

After his retirement – he was just 27 when he had to stop due to an ankle injury – De Groot started to work as an assistant coach for NEC. He was caretaker manager a record 5 times at the club. He was struck by cardiac arrest twice, in 2009 and 2024. He quit the club and football after almost 50 years in November 2025.
