= 1986–87 FC Porto season =

F.C. Porto
1986–87 season
- Manager: Artur Jorge
- Primeira Liga: 2nd
- European Cup: Winners
- Taça de Portugal: Semi-final
- Supertaça Cândido de Oliveira: Winners
- Top goalscorer: Fernando Gomes (21)
Home colours

The 1986–87 FC Porto season of the Portuguese Football Club FC Porto, based in Porto, Portugal.

== Season summary ==
Porto won the European Cup for the first time in their history.

== First-team squad ==
Squad at end of season

Note: Flags indicate national team as defined under FIFA eligibility rules; some limited exceptions apply. Players may hold more than one non-FIFA nationality.

No.	Pos.	Nation	Player
—	GK	POR	Zé Beto
—	GK	POL	Józef Młynarczyk
—	DF	POR	Bandeirinha
—	DF	POR	Cerqueira
—	DF	POR	Eurico
—	DF	POR	João Festas
—	DF	POR	Augusto Inácio
—	DF	POR	Laureta
—	DF	POR	Eduardo Luís
—	DF	POR	António Lima Pereira
—	DF	POR	João Pinto (captain)
—	DF	BRA	Celso
—	MF	POR	António André
—	MF	POR	Frasco

No.	Pos.	Nation	Player
—	MF	POR	Paulo Futre
—	MF	POR	Jaime Magalhães
—	MF	POR	Jaime Pacheco
—	MF	POR	Quim
—	MF	POR	José Semedo
—	MF	POR	António Sousa
—	MF	POR	Vermelhinho
—	MF	BRA	Elói
—	FW	POR	Fernando Gomes
—	FW	POR	Paulo Ricardo
—	FW	BRA	Casagrande
—	FW	BRA	Juary
—	FW	ALG	Rabah Madjer

== Competitions ==
=== Supertaça Cândido de Oliveira ===
19 November 1986 First leg	Porto	1–1	Benfica	Porto
19:00	Gomes 32'	Report	Rui Pedro 2'	Stadium: Estádio das Antas; Attendance: 60,000; Referee: Fortunato Azevedo

26 November 1986 Second leg	Benfica	2–4	Porto	Lisbon
20:00	Diamantino 67'; Dito 88'	Report	Madjer 36'; Futre 57', 70'; Gomes 81'	Stadium: Estádio da Luz; Attendance: 70,000; Referee: Carlos Silva Valente

=== Primeira Divisão ===
==== League table ====
Pos	Team	Pld	W	D	L	GF	GA	GD	Pts	Qualification
1	Benfica (C)	30	20	9	1	51	23	+28	49	Qualification to European Cup first round
2	Porto (Note: Porto qualified for the 1987–88 European Cup as the 1986–87 European Cup defending champions.)	30	20	6	4	67	22	+45	46	Qualification to European Cup first round
3	Vitória de Guimarães	30	14	13	3	45	22	+23	41	Qualification to UEFA Cup first round
4	Sporting CP	30	15	8	7	52	28	+24	38	Qualification to Cup Winners' Cup first round
5	Chaves	30	13	7	10	39	38	+1	33	Qualification to UEFA Cup first round

Source: RSSSF
(C) Champions

==== Matches ====
- Porto 2-2 Benfica
- Vitória de Guimarães 2-2 Porto
- Porto 3-0 Desportivo Chaves
- Rio Ave 0-0 Porto
- Porto 4-0 Salgueiros
- Academica 1-3 Porto
- Porto 5-0 Portimonense
- Belenenses 0-3 Porto
- Porto 2-0 Sporting CP
- Sporting Braga 0-1 Porto
- Boavista 1-1 Porto
- Porto 0-0 Varzim
- Maritimo 1-4 Porto
- Porto 8-3 Farense
- O Elvas 0-2 Porto
- Benfica 3-1 Porto
- Porto 2-2 Vitória de Guimarães
- Desportivo Chaves 1-2 Porto
- Porto 3-0 Rio Ave
- Salgueiros 0-3 Porto
- Porto 1-0 Academica
- Portimonense 1-0 Porto
- Porto 1-0 Belenenses
- Sporting CP 2-0 Porto
- Porto 3-1 Sporting Braga
- Porto 2-1 Boavista
- Varzim 0-2 Porto
- Porto 1-0 Maritimo
- Farense 1-0 Porto
- Porto 6-0 O Elvas

=== Taça de Portugal ===
==== Round of 128 ====
Porto 6-0 Salgueiros

==== Round of 64 ====
Estarreja 1-4 Porto

==== Round of 32 ====
Porto 5-0 Samora Correia

==== Round of 16 ====
Sporting Covilha 0-2 Porto

==== Quarter-finals ====
Porto 5-0 Vitória de Guimarães

==== Semi-finals ====
Porto 0-1 aet. Sporting CP

=== European Cup ===
==== First round ====
17 September 1986 First leg	Porto (Portugal)	9–0	(Malta) Rabat Ajax	Vila do Conde, Portugal
	Fernando Gomes 20' 49' 69' 83'; Eloi 25'; Madjer 54'; André 60' 65'; Celso 80'			Stadium: Estádio dos Arcos

1 October 1986 Second leg	Rabat Ajax (Malta)	0–1 (0–10 agg.)	(Portugal) Porto	Ta' Qali, Malta
			António Sousa 80'	Stadium: Ta' Qali National Stadium

==== Second round ====
22 October 1986 First leg	Vítkovice (Czechoslovakia)	1–0	(Portugal) Porto	Ostrava, Czechoslovakia
	Šourek 24' (pen.)			Stadium: Městský stadion

5 November 1986 Second leg	Porto (Portugal)	3–0 (3–1 agg.)	(Czechoslovakia) Vítkovice	Porto, Portugal
	André 5'; Celso 26'; Paulo Futre 82'			Stadium: Estádio das Antas

==== Quarter-finals ====
4 March 1987 First leg	Porto (Portugal)	1–0	(Denmark) Brøndby	Porto, Portugal
	Madjer 71'			Stadium: Estádio das Antas

18 March 1987 Second leg	Brøndby (Denmark)	1–1 (1–2 agg.)	(Portugal) Porto	Brøndby, Denmark
	Steffensen 36'		Juary 74'	Stadium: Brøndby Stadion

==== Semi-finals ====
8 April 1987 First leg	Porto (Portugal)	2–1	(Soviet Union) Dynamo Kiev	Porto, Portugal
	Paulo Futre 48'; André 57' (pen.)		Yakovenko 74'	Stadium: Estádio das Antas

22 April 1987 Second leg	Dynamo Kiev (Soviet Union)	1–2 (2–4 agg.)	(Portugal) Porto	Kiev, Soviet Union
	Mykhaylychenko 13'		Celso 3'; Fernando Gomes 11'	Stadium: Respublikanskiy Stadium

==== Final ====
27 May 1987	Bayern Munich (West Germany)	1–2	(Portugal) Porto	Vienna, Austria
	Kögl 25'	Report	Madjer 77'; Juary 80'	Stadium: Praterstadion; Attendance: 57,500; Referee: Alexis Ponnet (Belgium)

== Statistics ==
=== Top scorers ===
==== Primeira Liga ====
- Fernando Gomes - 21
