= 1987 European Cup final =

- Match programme cover
- Event: 1986–87 European Cup
Bayern Munich	Porto
(West Germany)	(Portugal)
1	2
- Date: 27 May 1987
- Venue: Praterstadion, Vienna
- Referee: Alexis Ponnet (Belgium)
- Attendance: 57,500

The 1987 European Cup final was a football match held at the Praterstadion, Vienna, Austria, on 27 May 1987, that saw FC Porto of Portugal defeat Bayern München of West Germany 2–1. Both sides were missing key players: the Germans were missing their sweeper and captain Klaus Augenthaler, who was suspended, along with striker Roland Wohlfarth and midfielder Hans Dorfner, who were both injured, while the Portuguese were without their injured striker Fernando Gomes.

Porto won its first European trophy after fighting back from 1–0 down, with the goals coming from a back heel by Rabah Madjer and a volley from Juary, after a Ludwig Kögl header had given Bayern the lead in the first half. This was the first European Cup final that Bayern, and their captain Lothar Matthäus, would lose to successive late goals, repeated 12 years later in the 1999 UEFA Champions League final against Manchester United.

== Route to the final ==
Bayern Munich				Round	Porto			
Opponent	Agg.	1st leg	2nd leg		Opponent	Agg.	1st leg	2nd leg
(Netherlands) PSV Eindhoven	2–0	2–0 (A)	0–0 (H)	First round	(Malta) Rabat Ajax	10–0	9–0 (H)	1–0 (A)
Austria Wien	3–1	2–0 (A)	1–1 (H)	Second round	(Czechoslovakia) Vítkovice	3–1	0–1 (A)	3–0 (H)
(Belgium) Anderlecht	7–2	5–0 (H)	2–2 (A)	Quarter-finals	(Denmark) Brøndby IF	2–1	1–0 (H)	1–1 (A)
(Spain) Real Madrid	4–2	4–1 (H)	0–1 (A)	Semi-finals	(Soviet Union) Dynamo Kyiv	4–2	2–1 (A)	2–1 (H)

== Match ==
=== Details ===
27 May 1987
20:15 CEST

Bayern Munich (West Germany)	1–2	(Portugal) Porto
Kögl 25'	Report	Madjer 77'; Juary 80'

Praterstadion, Vienna
Attendance: 57,500
Referee: Alexis Ponnet (Belgium)

Bayern Munich	Porto

GK	1	(Belgium) Jean-Marie Pfaff
SW	5	(East Germany) Norbert Nachtweih
RB	2	(West Germany) Helmut Winklhofer	(yellow card) 65'
CB	4	(West Germany) Norbert Eder
LB	3	(West Germany) Hans Pflügler
RM	7	(West Germany) Hansi Flick		(substituted off) 82'
CM	8	(West Germany) Lothar Matthäus (c)
LM	6	(West Germany) Andreas Brehme
RF	10	(West Germany) Michael Rummenigge
CF	9	(West Germany) Dieter Hoeneß
LF	11	(West Germany) Ludwig Kögl
Substitutes:
GK	12	(West Germany) Raimond Aumann
DF	13	(West Germany) Uli Bayerschmidt
DF	14	(West Germany) Alexander Kutschera
DF	15	(West Germany) Holger Willmer
FW	16	(Denmark) Lars Lunde		(substituted on) 82'
Manager:
(West Germany) Udo Lattek

GK	1	(Poland) Józef Młynarczyk
RB	2	(Portugal) João Pinto (c)
CB	4	(Portugal) Eduardo Luís
CB	5	(Brazil) Celso	(yellow card) 62'
LB	3	(Portugal) Augusto Inácio		(substituted off) 66'
DM	7	(Portugal) Jaime Magalhães	(yellow card) 35'
CM	6	(Portugal) Quim		(substituted off) 46'
RW	9	(Portugal) António Sousa	(yellow card) 71'
AM	11	(Portugal) António André
LW	10	(Portugal) Paulo Futre
CF	8	(Algeria) Rabah Madjer
Substitutes:
GK	12	(Portugal) Zé Beto
DF	13	(Portugal) Festas
MF	14	(Portugal) António Frasco		(substituted on) 66'
FW	15	(Brazil) Walter Casagrande
FW	16	(Brazil) Juary		(substituted on) 46'
Manager:
(Portugal) Artur Jorge

Assistant referees:
Alphonse Costantin (Belgium)
Frans Van Den Wijngaert (Belgium)

Match rules

- 90 minutes.
- 30 minutes of extra time if necessary.
- Penalty shoot-out if scores still level.
- Five named substitutes.
- Maximum of two substitutions.

== See also ==
- 1986–87 FC Bayern Munich season
- 1986–87 FC Porto season
- 1987 European Cup Winners' Cup final
- 1987 European Super Cup
- 1987 UEFA Cup final
- 1987 Intercontinental Cup
- FC Bayern Munich in international football
- FC Porto in international football
