= Portuguese football clubs in international competitions =

Points by season (UEFA coefficient)
Season	Points
1998–99	3.500
1999–2000	5.833
2000–01	6.125
2001–02	9.375
2002–03	10.750
2003–04	10.250
2004–05	8.166
2005–06	5.500
2006–07	8.083
2007–08	7.928
2008–09	6.785
2009–10	10.000
2010–11	18.800
2011–12	11.833
2012–13	11.750
2013–14	9.916
2014–15	9.083
2015–16	10.500
2016–17	8.083
2017–18	9.666
2018–19	10.900
2019–20	10.300
2020–21	9.600
2021–22	12.916
2022–23	12.500
2023–24	11.000
2024–25	16.250
2025–26	20.500
2026–27	

Portuguese football clubs have entered in official international association football competitions since 1955–56 season, when Sporting took part in the inaugural European Cup (not counting the participation of the Portuguese clubs in the Latin Cup). Sporting's striker João Martins would also make history, as he was the first player ever to score a goal in the European Cup against FK Partizan. Benfica became the first Portuguese club to win the UEFA Champions League, after winning two consecutive titles in 1961 and 1962 breaking the victorious sequence of 5 consecutive titles of Real Madrid. Porto would be the other Portuguese club to conquer the UEFA Champions League, both in 1987 and 2004, and the only Portuguese club to be world champions, after winning the Intercontinental Cup the both times Porto disputed. Porto's European title in 2004 would also be the last title of the UEFA Champions League outside of the Big Five leagues. The only other Portuguese club to win at least a major trophy in Europe is Sporting, who won the Cup Winners' Cup in 1964.

== Final appearance by competition ==
Competition	Winners	Runners-up	Total
European Cup / UEFA Champions League	4	5	9
UEFA Cup / UEFA Europa League	2	5	7
European / UEFA Cup Winners' Cup	1	1	2
European / UEFA Super Cup	1	3	4
UEFA Intertoto Cup	1	1	2
Intercontinental Cup	2	2	4
Total	10	17	27

== Final appearance by club ==
=== European Cup / UEFA Champions League ===
Club	Winners	Runner-up	Years won	Years runner-up
Benfica	2	5	1961, 1962	1963, 1965, 1968, 1988, 1990
Porto	2	0	1987, 2004	—

=== UEFA Cup / UEFA Europa League ===
Club	Winners	Runners-up	Years won	Years runner-up
Porto	2	0	2003, 2011	—
Benfica	0	3	—	1983, 2013, 2014
Sporting	0	1	—	2005
Braga	0	1	—	2011

=== European / UEFA Cup Winners' Cup ===
Club	Winners	Runners-up	Years won	Years runner-up
Sporting	1	0	1964	—
Porto	0	1	—	1984

=== European / UEFA Super Cup ===
Club	Winners	Runner-up	Years won	Years runner-up
Porto	1	3	1987	2003, 2004, 2011

=== UEFA Intertoto Cup ===
Club	Winners	Runner-up	Years won	Years runner-up
União de Leiria	1	1	2007^{a}	2004
Braga	1	0	2008	—

=== Intercontinental Cup ===
Club	Winners	Runner-up	Years won	Years runner-up
Porto	2	0	1987, 2004	—
Benfica	0	2	—	1961, 1962

== Full record ==
=== European competitions ===
==== European Cup / UEFA Champions League ====
Season	Team	Progress	Score	Opponent	Venue(s)
1955–56	Sporting	First round	5–8	(Socialist Federal Republic of Yugoslavia) Partizan	3–3 home, 2–5 away
1956–57	Porto	Preliminary round	3–5	(Spain) Athletic Club	1–2 home, 2–3 away
1957–58	Benfica	Preliminary round	3–1	(Spain) Sevilla	0–0 home, 3–1 away
1958–59	Sporting	First round	2–6	(Belgium) Standard Liège	2–3 home, 0–3 away
1959–60	Porto	Preliminary round	3–5	(Czechoslovakia) Červená Hviezda Bratislava	1–2 home, 2–3 away
**1960–61**	**Benfica**	**Winners**	3–2	(Spain) Barcelona	(Switzerland) Wankdorf Stadium, Bern
**1961–62**	**Benfica**	**Winners**	5–3	(Spain) Real Madrid	(Netherlands) Olympisch Stadion, Amsterdam
**1961–62**	Sporting	First round	1–3	(Socialist Federal Republic of Yugoslavia) Partizan	1–1 home, 0–2 away
1962–63	Benfica	Runners-up	1–2	(Italy) Milan	(England) Wembley Stadium, London
1962–63	Sporting	First round	2–4	(Scotland) Dundee	1–0 home, 1–4 away
1963–64	Benfica	First round	2–6	(West Germany) Borussia Dortmund	2–1 home, 0–5 away
1964–65	Benfica	Runners-up	0–1	(Italy) Inter Milan	(Italy) San Siro, Milan
1965–66	Benfica	Quarter-finals	3–8	(England) Manchester United	1–5 home, 2–3 away
1966–67	Sporting	First round	0–7	(Hungary) Vasas	0–2 home, 0–5 away
1967–68	Benfica	Runners-up	1–4 (a.e.t.)	(England) Manchester United	(England) Wembley Stadium, London
1968–69	Benfica	Quarter-finals	4–7	(Netherlands) Ajax	1–3 home, 3–1 away, 0–3 (a.e.t.) playoff
1969–70	Benfica	Second round	3–3 (c)	(Scotland) Celtic	3–0 home, 0–3 away
1970–71	Sporting	Second round	2–4	(East Germany) Carl Zeiss Jena	1–2 home, 1–2 away
1971–72	Benfica	Semi-finals	0–1	(Netherlands) Ajax	0–0 home, 0–1 away
1972–73	Benfica	Second round	0–3	(England) Derby County	0–0 home, 0–3 away
1973–74	Benfica	Second round	1–3	(Hungary) Újpest	1–1 home, 0–2 away
1974–75	Sporting	First round	1–3	(France) Saint-Étienne	1–1 home, 0–2 away
1975–76	Benfica	Quarter-finals	1–5	(West Germany) Bayern Munich	0–0 home, 1–5 away
1976–77	Benfica	First round	0–2	(East Germany) Dynamo Dresden	0–0 home, 0–2 away
1977–78	Benfica	Quarter-finals	2–6	(England) Liverpool	1–2 home, 1–4 away
1978–79	Porto	First round	5–7	(Greece) AEK Athens	4–1 home, 1–6 away
1979–80	Porto	Second round	2–2 (a)	(Spain) Real Madrid	2–1 home, 0–1 away
1980–81	Sporting	First round	0–3	(Hungary) Budapest Honvéd	0–2 home, 0–1 away
1981–82	Benfica	Second round	1–4	(West Germany) Bayern Munich	0–0 home, 1–4 away
1982–83	Sporting	Quarter-finals	1–2	(Spain) Real Sociedad	1–0 home, 0–2 away
1983–84	Benfica	Quarter-finals	1–5	(England) Liverpool	1–4 home, 0–1 away
1984–85	Benfica	Second round	2–3	(England) Liverpool	1–0 home, 1–3 away
1985–86	Porto	Second round	3–3 (a)	(Spain) Barcelona	3–1 home, 0–2 away
**1986–87**	**Porto**	**Winners**	2–1	(West Germany) Bayern Munich	(Austria) Praterstadion, Vienna
1987–88	Benfica	Runners-up	0–0 (5–6 p)	(Netherlands) PSV Eindhoven	(Germany) Neckarstadion, Stuttgart
1987–88	Porto	Second round	2–4	(Spain) Real Madrid	1–2 home, 1–2 away
1988–89	Porto	Second round	2–5	(Netherlands) PSV Eindhoven	2–0 home, 0–5 away
1989–90	Benfica	Runners-up	0–1	(Italy) Milan	(Austria) Praterstadion, Vienna
1990–91	Porto	Quarter-finals	1–3	(West Germany) Bayern Munich	1–1 home, 0–2 away
1991–92	Benfica	Group stage (3rd)	N/A	(Spain) Barcelona, (Czechoslovakia) Sparta Prague, (Commonwealth of Independent States) Dynamo Kyiv	
1992–93	Porto	Group stage (3rd)	N/A	(Italy) Milan, (Sweden) IFK Göteborg, (Netherlands) PSV Eindhoven	
1993–94	Porto	Semi-finals	0–3	(Spain) Barcelona	(Spain) Camp Nou, Barcelona
1994–95	Benfica	Quarter-finals	0–2	(Italy) Milan	0–0 home, 0–2 away
1995–96	Porto	Group stage (3rd)	N/A	(Greece) Panathinaikos, (France) Nantes, (Denmark) Aalborg AB	
1996–97	Porto	Quarter-finals	0–4	(England) Manchester United	0–0 home, 0–4 away
1997–98	Sporting	Group stage (3rd)	N/A	(France) Monaco, (Germany) Bayer Leverkusen, (Belgium) Lierse	
1997–98	Porto	Group stage (4th)	N/A	(Spain) Real Madrid, (Norway) Rosenborg, (Greece) Olympiacos	
1998–99	Benfica	Group stage (2nd)	N/A	(Germany) Kaiserslautern, (Netherlands) PSV Eindhoven, (Finland) HJK	
1998–99	Porto	Group stage (3rd)	N/A	(Greece) Olympiacos, Croatia Zagreb, (Netherlands) Ajax	
1999–2000	Porto	Quarter-finals	2–3	(Germany) Bayern Munich	1–1 home, 1–2 away
1999–2000	Boavista	First group stage (4th)	N/A	(Norway) Rosenborg, (Netherlands) Feyenoord, (Germany) Borussia Dortmund	
2000–01	Sporting	First group stage (4th)	N/A	(Spain) Real Madrid, (Russia) Spartak Moscow, (Germany) Bayer Leverkusen	
2000–01	Porto	Third qualifying round	0–1	(Belgium) Anderlecht	0–0 home, 0–1 away
2001–02	Boavista	Second group stage (3rd)	N/A	(England) Manchester United, (Germany) Bayern Munich, (France) Nantes	
2001–02	Porto	Second group stage (4th)	N/A	(Spain) Real Madrid, (Greece) Panathinaikos, (Czech Republic) Sparta Prague	
2002–03	Boavista	Third qualifying round	0–1	(France) Auxerre	0–1 home, 0–0 away
2002–03	Sporting	Third qualifying round	0–2	(Italy) Inter Milan	0–0 home, 0–2 away
**2003–04**	**Porto**	**Winners**	3–0	(France) Monaco	(Germany) Arena AufSchalke, Gelsenkirchen
**2003–04**	Benfica	Third qualifying round	1–4	(Italy) Lazio	0–1 home, 1–3 away
2004–05	Porto	Round of 16	2–4	(Italy) Inter Milan	1–1 home, 1–3 away
2004–05	Benfica	Third qualifying round	1–3	(Belgium) Anderlecht	1–0 home, 0–3 away
2005–06	Benfica	Quarter-finals	0–2	(Spain) Barcelona	0–0 home, 0–2 away
2005–06	Porto	Group stage (4th)	N/A	(Italy) Inter Milan, (Scotland) Rangers, (Slovakia) Artmedia Bratislava	
2005–06	Sporting	Third qualifying round	2–4	(Italy) Udinese	0–1 home, 2–3 away
2006–07	Porto	Round of 16	2–3	(England) Chelsea	1–1 home, 1–2 away
2006–07	Benfica	Group stage (3rd)	N/A	(England) Manchester United, (Scotland) Celtic, (Denmark) Copenhagen	
2006–07	Sporting	Group stage (4th)	N/A	(Germany) Bayern Munich, (Italy) Inter Milan, (Russia) Spartak Moscow	
2007–08	Porto	Round of 16	1–1 (1–4 p)	(Germany) Schalke 04	1–0 home, 0–1 away
2007–08	Benfica	Group stage (3rd)	N/A	(Italy) Milan, (Scotland) Celtic, (Ukraine) Shakhtar Donetsk	
2007–08	Sporting	Group stage (3rd)	N/A	(England) Manchester United, (Italy) Roma, (Ukraine) Dynamo Kyiv	
2008–09	Porto	Quarter-finals	2–3	(England) Manchester United	0–1 home, 2–2 away
2008–09	Sporting	Round of 16	1–12	(Germany) Bayern Munich	0–5 home, 1–7 away
2008–09	Vitória de Guimarães	Third qualifying round	1–2	(Switzerland) Basel	0–0 home, 1–2 away
2009–10	Porto	Round of 16	2–6	(England) Arsenal	2–1 home, 0–5 away
2009–10	Sporting	Third qualifying round	3–3 (a)	(Italy) Fiorentina	2–2 home, 1–1 away
2010–11	Braga	Group stage (3rd)	N/A	(Ukraine) Shakhtar Donetsk, (England) Arsenal, (Serbia) Partizan	
2010–11	Benfica	Group stage (3rd)	N/A	(Germany) Schalke 04, (France) Lyon, (Israel) Hapoel Tel Aviv	
2011–12	Benfica	Quarter-finals	1–3	(England) Chelsea	0–1 home, 1–2 away
2011–12	Porto	Group stage (3rd)	N/A	(Cyprus) APOEL, (Russia) Zenit Saint Petersburg, (Ukraine) Shakhtar Donetsk	
2012–13	Porto	Round of 16	1–2	(Spain) Málaga	0–1 home, 0–2 away
2012–13	Benfica	Group stage (3rd)	N/A	(Spain) Barcelona, (Scotland) Celtic, (Russia) Spartak Moscow	
2012–13	Braga	Group stage (4th)	N/A	(England) Manchester United, (Turkey) Galatasaray, (Romania) Cluj	
2013–14	Benfica	Group stage (3rd)	N/A	(France) Paris Saint-Germain, (Greece) Olympiacos, (Belgium) Anderlecht	
2013–14	Porto	Group stage (3rd)	N/A	(Spain) Atlético Madrid, (Russia) Zenit Saint Petersburg, Austria Wien	
2013–14	Paços de Ferreira	Play-off round	3–8	(Russia) Zenit Saint Petersburg	1–4 home, 2–4 away
2014–15	Porto	Quarter-finals	4–7	(Germany) Bayern Munich	3–1 home, 1–6 away
2014–15	Sporting	Group stage (3rd)	N/A	(England) Chelsea, (Germany) Schalke 04, (Slovenia) Maribor	
2014–15	Benfica	Group stage (4th)	N/A	(France) Monaco, (Germany) Bayer Leverkusen, (Russia) Zenit Saint Petersburg	
2015–16	Benfica	Quarter-finals	2–3	(Germany) Bayern Munich	2–2 home, 0–1 away
2015–16	Porto	Group stage (3rd)	N/A	(England) Chelsea, (Ukraine) Dynamo Kyiv, (Israel) Maccabi Tel Aviv	
2015–16	Sporting	Play-off round	3–4	(Russia) CSKA Moscow	2–1 home, 1–3 away
2016–17	Benfica	Round of 16	1–4	(Germany) Borussia Dortmund	1–0 home, 0–4 away
2016–17	Porto	Round of 16	0–3	(Italy) Juventus	0–2 home, 0–1 away
2016–17	Sporting	Group stage (4th)	N/A	(Spain) Real Madrid, (Germany) Borussia Dortmund, (Poland) Legia Warsaw	
2017–18	Porto	Round of 16	0–5	(England) Liverpool	0–5 home, 0–0 away
2017–18	Sporting	Group stage (3rd)	N/A	(Spain) Barcelona, (Italy) Juventus, (Greece) Olympiacos	
2017–18	Benfica	Group stage (4th)	N/A	(England) Manchester United, (Switzerland) Basel, (Russia) CSKA Moscow	
2018–19	Porto	Quarter-finals	1–6	(England) Liverpool	1–4 home, 0–2 away
2018–19	Benfica	Group stage (3rd)	N/A	(Germany) Bayern Munich, (Netherlands) Ajax, (Greece) AEK Athens	
2019–20	Benfica	Group stage (3rd)	N/A	(Germany) RB Leipzig, (France) Lyon, (Russia) Zenit Saint Petersburg	
2019–20	Porto	Third qualifying round	3–3 (a)	(Russia) Krasnodar	2–3 home, 1–0 away
2020–21	Benfica	Third qualifying round	1–2	(Greece) PAOK	(Greece) Toumba Stadium, Thessaloniki
2020–21	Porto	Quarter-finals	1–2	(England) Chelsea	0–2 home, 1–0 away
2021–22	Benfica	Quarter-finals	4–6	(England) Liverpool	1–3 home, 3–3 away
2021–22	Sporting	Round of 16	0–5	(England) Manchester City	0–5 home, 0–0 away
2021–22	Porto	Group stage (3rd)	N/A	(England) Liverpool, (Spain) Atletico Madrid, (Italy) Milan	
2022–23	Benfica	Quarter-finals	3–5	(Italy) Inter Milan	0–2 home, 3–3 away
2022–23	Porto	Round of 16	0–1	(Italy) Inter Milan	0–0 home, 0–1 away
2022–23	Sporting	Group stage (3rd)	N/A	(England) Tottenham Hotspur, (Germany) Eintracht Frankfurt, (France) Marseille	
2023–24	Porto	Round of 16	1–1 (2–4 p)	(England) Arsenal	1–0 home, 0–1 (a.e.t.) away
2023–24	Benfica	Group stage (3rd)	N/A	(Spain) Real Sociedad, (Italy) Inter Milan, (Austria) Red Bull Salzburg	
2023–24	Braga	Group stage (3rd)	N/A	(Spain) Real Madrid, (Italy) Napoli, (Germany) Union Berlin	
2024–25	Benfica	Round of 16	1–4	(Spain) Barcelona	0–1 home, 1–3 away
2024–25	Sporting	Knockout phase play-offs	0–3	(Germany) Borussia Dortmund	0–3 home, 0–0 away
2025–26	Sporting	Quarter-finals	0–1	(England) Arsenal	0–1 home, 0–0 away
2025–26	Benfica	Knockout phase play-offs	1–3	(Spain) Real Madrid	0–1 home, 1–2 away
2026–27	Porto				
2026–27	Sporting				

==== UEFA Cup / UEFA Europa League ====
Season	Team	Progress	Score	Opponent	Venue(s)
1971–72	Vitória de Setúbal	Third round	1–3	(Romania) UTA Arad	1–0 home, 0–3 away
1971–72	Porto	First round	1–3	(France) Nantes	1–1 home, 0–2 away
1971–72	Académica	First round	1–7	(England) Wolverhampton Wanderers	1–3 home, 0–4 away
1972–73	Vitória de Setúbal	Quarter-finals	2–2 (a)	(England) Tottenham Hotspur	2–1 home, 0–1 away
1972–73	Porto	Third round	1–3	(East Germany) Dynamo Dresden	1–2 home, 0–1 away
1972–73	CUF Barreiro	Second round	2–3	(West Germany) Kaiserslautern	1–3 home, 1–0 away
1973–74	Vitória de Setúbal	Quarter-finals	2–3	(West Germany) Stuttgart	2–2 home, 0–1 away
1973–74	Belenenses	First round	1–4	(England) Wolverhampton Wanderers	0–2 home, 1–2 away
1974–75	Porto	Second round	0–2	(Italy) Napoli	0–1 home, 0–1 away
1974–75	Vitória de Setúbal	First round	1–5	(Spain) Real Zaragoza	1–1 home, 0–4 away
1975–76	Porto	Third round	2–3	(West Germany) Hamburg	2–1 home, 0–2 away
1975–76	Sporting	Second round	3–4	(Hungary) Vasas	2–1 home, 1–3 away
1976–77	Porto	First round	4–5	(West Germany) Schalke 04	2–2 home, 2–3 away
1976–77	Belenenses	First round	4–5	(Spain) Barcelona	2–2 home, 2–3 away
1977–78	Sporting	First round	3–5	(France) Bastia	1–2 home, 2–3 away
1977–78	Boavista	First round	1–5	(Italy) Lazio	1–0 home, 0–5 away
1978–79	Benfica	First round	0–2 (a.e.t.)	(West Germany) Borussia Mönchengladbach	0–0 home, 0–2 (a.e.t.) away
1978–79	Braga	First round	0–3	(England) West Bromwich Albion	0–2 home, 0–1 away
1979–80	Sporting	Second round	1–3	(Germany) Kaiserslautern	1–1 home, 0–2 away
1979–80	Benfica	First round	3–4	(Greece) Aris Thessaloniki	0–1 home, 2–2 away
1980–81	Porto	First round	2–3 (a.e.t.)	(Switzerland) Grasshopper	2–0 home, 0–3 (a.e.t.) away
1980–81	Boavista	First round	2–3	(France) Sochaux	0–1 home, 2–2 away
1981–82	Sporting	Third round	0–1	(Switzerland) Neuchâtel Xamax	0–0 home, 0–1 away
1981–82	Boavista	Second round	1–2	(Spain) Valencia	1–0 home, 0–2 away
1982–83	Benfica	Runners-up	1–2	(Belgium) Anderlecht	1–1 home, 0–1 away
1982–83	Porto	Second round	3–6	(Belgium) Anderlecht	3–2 home, 0–4 away
1983–84	Sporting	Second round	2–5	(Scotland) Celtic	2–0 home, 0–5 away
1983–84	Vitória de Guimarães	First round	1–5	(England) Aston Villa	1–0 home, 0–5 away
1984–85	Sporting	Second round	2–2 (3–5 p)	(Soviet Union) Dinamo Minsk	2–0 home, 0–2 (a.e.t.) away
1984–85	Braga	First round	0–9	(England) Tottenham Hotspur	0–3 home, 0–6 away
1985–86	Sporting	Quarter-finals	1–3	(West Germany) Köln	1–1 home, 0–2 away
1985–86	Boavista	First round	5–6	(Belgium) Club Brugge	4–3 home, 1–3 away
1985–86	Portimonense	First round	1–4	(Socialist Federal Republic of Yugoslavia) Partizan	1–0 home, 0–4 away
1986–87	Vitória de Guimarães	Quarter-finals	2–5	(West Germany) Borussia Mönchengladbach	2–2 home, 0–3 away
1986–87	Sporting	Second round	2–2 (a)	(Spain) Barcelona	2–1 home, 0–1 away
1986–87	Boavista	Second round	1–3	(Scotland) Rangers	0–1 home, 1–2 away
1987–88	Vitória de Guimarães	Third round	2–2 (4–5 p)	(Czechoslovakia) Vítkovice	2–0 home, 0–2 (a.e.t.) away
1987–88	Chaves	Second round	2–5	(Hungary) Budapest Honvéd	1–2 home, 1–3 away
1987–88	Belenenses	First round	1–2	(Spain) Barcelona	1–0 home, 0–2 away
1988–89	Belenenses	Second round	0–0 (3–4 p)	(Socialist Federal Republic of Yugoslavia) RŠD Velež	0–0 (a.e.t.) home, 0–0 away
1988–89	Benfica	Second round	2–3	(Belgium) RFC Liège	1–1 home, 1–2 away
1988–89	Sporting	Second round	1–2	(Spain) Real Sociedad	1–2 home, 0–0 away
1989–90	Porto	Third round	2–2 (a)	(West Germany) Hamburg	2–1 home, 0–1 away
1989–90	Sporting	Second round	0–0 (3–4 p)	(Italy) Napoli	0–0 home, 0–0 away
1989–90	Boavista	Second round	2–3 (a.e.t.)	(East Germany) Karl-Marx-Stadt	2–2 (a.e.t.) home, 0–1 away
1990–91	Sporting	Semi-finals	0–2	(Italy) Inter Milan	0–0 home, 0–2 away
1990–91	Benfica	First round	0–2	(Italy) Roma	0–1 home, 0–1 away
1990–91	Vitória de Guimarães	First round	2–6	(Turkey) Fenerbahçe	2–3 home, 0–3 away
1991–92	Boavista	Second round	0–2	(Italy) Torino	0–0 home, 0–2 away
1991–92	Salgueiros	First round	1–1 (2–4 p)	(France) Cannes	1–0 home, 0–1 (a.e.t.) away
1991–92	Sporting	First round	1–2 (a.e.t.)	(Romania) Dinamo București	1–0 home, 0–2 (a.e.t.) away
1992–93	Benfica	Quarter-finals	2–4	(Italy) Juventus	2–1 home, 0–3 away
1992–93	Vitória de Guimarães	Second round	1–5	(Netherlands) Ajax	0–3 home, 1–2 away
1992–93	Sporting	First round	3–4 (a.e.t.)	(Switzerland) Grasshopper	2–1 home, 1–3 (a.e.t.) away
1993–94	Boavista	Quarter-finals	1–2	(Germany) Karlsruhe	1–1 home, 0–1 away
1993–94	Sporting	Third round	1–5	Austria Salzburg	0–3 home, 1–2 away
1993–94	Marítimo	First round	2–4	(Belgium) Royal Antwerp	2–2 home, 0–2 away
1994–95	Boavista	Second round	2–3	(Italy) Napoli	1–1 home, 1–2 away
1994–95	Marítimo	Second round	1–3	(Italy) Juventus	0–1 home, 1–2 away
1994–95	Sporting	First round	2–2 (a)	(Spain) Real Madrid	2–1 home, 0–1 away
1995–96	Benfica	Third round	2–7	(Germany) Bayern Munich	1–4 home, 1–3 away
1995–96	Vitória de Guimarães	Second round	0–7	(Spain) Barcelona	0–4 home, 0–3 away
1995–96	Farense	First round	0–2	(France) Lyon	0–1 home, 0–1 away
1996–97	Boavista	Third round	1–7	(Italy) Inter Milan	0–2 home, 1–5 away
1996–97	Vitória de Guimarães	Second round	1–1 (a)	(Belgium) Anderlecht	1–1 home, 0–0 away
1996–97	Sporting	Second round	2–3	(France) Metz	2–1 home, 0–2 away
1997–98	Braga	Third round	0–2	(Germany) Schalke 04	0–0 home, 0–2 away
1997–98	Vitória de Guimarães	First round	1–6	(Italy) Lazio	0–4 home, 1–2 away
1997–98	Benfica	First round	0–1	(France) Bastia	0–0 home, 0–1 away
1998–99	Marítimo	First round	1–1 (1–4 p)	(England) Leeds United	1–0 (a.e.t.) home, 0–1 away
1998–99	Vitória de Guimarães	First round	2–4	(Scotland) Celtic	1–2 home, 1–2 away
1998–99	Sporting	First round	1–4	(Italy) Bologna	0–2 home, 1–2 away
1999–2000	Benfica	Third round	1–8	(Spain) Celta de Vigo	1–1 home, 0–7 away
1999–2000	Beira-Mar	First round	1–2	(Netherlands) Vitesse	1–0 home, 0–2 away
1999–2000	Sporting	First round	1–3	(Norway) Viking	1–0 home, 0–3 away
1999–2000	Vitória de Setúbal	First round	1–7	(Italy) Roma	1–0 home, 0–7 away
2000–01	Porto	Quarter-finals	0–2	(England) Liverpool	0–0 home, 0–2 away
2000–01	Boavista	Second round	1–2	(Italy) Roma	0–1 home, 1–1 away
2000–01	Benfica	First round	3–4	(Sweden) Halmstads	2–1 home, 0–2 away
2001–02	Sporting	Third round	1–3	(Italy) Milan	1–1 home, 0–2 away
2001–02	Marítimo	Second round	1–3	(England) Leeds United	1–0 home, 0–3 away
2002–03	**Porto**	**Winners**	3–2 (a.e.t.)	(Scotland) Celtic	(Spain) Estadio Olímpico de Sevilla, Sevilla
2002–03	Boavista	Semi-finals	1–2	(Scotland) Celtic	0–1 home, 1–1 away
2002–03	Sporting	First round	4–6 (a.e.t.)	(Serbia and Montenegro) Partizan	1–3 home, 3–3 (a.e.t.) away
2002–03	Leixões	First round	3–5	(Greece) PAOK	2–1 home, 1–4 away
2003–04	Benfica	Fourth round	3–4	(Italy) Inter Milan	0–0 home, 3–4 away
2003–04	Sporting	Second round	1–4	(Turkey) Gençlerbirliği	0–3 home, 1–1 away
2003–04	União de Leiria	First round	2–3	(Norway) Molde	1–0 home, 1–3 away
2004–05	Sporting	Runners-up	1–3	(Russia) CSKA Moscow	(Portugal) Estádio José Alvalade, Lisbon
2004–05	Benfica	Round of 32	1–3	(Russia) CSKA Moscow	1–1 home, 0–2 away
2004–05	Marítimo	First round	1–1 (2–4 p)	(Scotland) Rangers	1–0 home, 0–1 (a.e.t.) away
2004–05	Braga	First round	3–5	(Scotland) Heart of Midlothian	2–2 home, 1–3 away
2004–05	Nacional	First round	1–4	(Spain) Sevilla	1–2 home, 0–2 away
2005–06	Vitória de Guimarães	Group stage (5th)	N/A	(Spain) Sevilla, (Russia) Zenit Saint Petersburg, (England) Bolton Wanderers, (Turkey) Beşiktaş	
2005–06	Vitória de Setúbal	First round	1–2	(Italy) Sampdoria	1–1 home, 0–1 away
2005–06	Braga	First round	1–1 (a)	(Serbia and Montenegro) Red Star Belgrade	1–1 home, 0–0 away
2005–06	Sporting	First round	4–4 (a)	(Sweden) Halmstads	2–3 home, 2–1 away
2006–07	Benfica	Quarter-finals	2–3	(Spain) Espanyol	0–0 home, 2–3 away
2006–07	Braga	Round of 16	4–6	(England) Tottenham Hotspur	2–3 home, 2–3 away
2006–07	Vitória de Setúbal	First round	0–3	(Netherlands) Heerenveen	0–3 home, 0–0 away
2006–07	Nacional	First round	1–3 (a.e.t.)	(Romania) Rapid București	1–2 (a.e.t.) home, 0–1 away
2007–08	Sporting	Quarter-finals	0–2	(Scotland) Rangers	0–2 home, 0–0 away
2007–08	Benfica	Round of 16	1–3	(Spain) Getafe	1–2 home, 0–1 away
2007–08	Braga	Round of 32	0–4	(Germany) Werder Bremen	0–1 home, 0–3 away
2007–08	Belenenses	First round	0–3	(Germany) Bayern Munich	0–1 home, 0–2 away
2007–08	Paços de Ferreira	First round	0–1	(Netherlands) AZ Alkmaar	0–1 home, 0–0 away
2007–08	União de Leiria	First round	4–5	(Germany) Bayer Leverkusen	3–2 home, 1–3 away
2008–09	Braga	Round of 16	0–1	(France) Paris Saint-Germain	0–1 home, 0–0 away
2008–09	Benfica	Group stage (5th)	N/A	(Ukraine) Metalist Kharkiv, (Turkey) Galatasaray, (Greece) Olympiacos, (Germany) Hertha Berlin	
2008–09	Vitória de Guimarães	First round	2–4 (a.e.t.)	(England) Portsmouth	2–2 (a.e.t.) home, 0–2 away
2008–09	Marítimo	First round	1–3	(Spain) Valencia	0–1 home, 1–2 away
2008–09	Vitória de Setúbal	First round	3–6	(Netherlands) Heerenveen	1–1 home, 2–5 away
2009–10	Benfica	Quarter-finals	3–5	(England) Liverpool	2–1 home, 1–4 away
2009–10	Sporting	Round of 16	2–2	(Spain) Atlético Madrid	2–2 home, 0–0 away
2009–10	Nacional	Group stage (3rd)	N/A	(Germany) Werder Bremen, (Spain) Athletic Club, Austria Wien	
2009–10	Paços de Ferreira	Third qualifying round	0–2	(Israel) Bnei Yehuda	0–1 home, 0–1 away
2009–10	Braga	Third qualifying round	1–4	(Sweden) Elfsborg	1–2 home, 0–2 away
2010–11	**Porto**	**Winners**	1–0	(Portugal) Braga	(Republic of Ireland) Aviva Stadium, Dublin
2010–11	Braga	Runners-up	0–1	(Portugal) Porto	(Republic of Ireland) Aviva Stadium, Dublin
2010–11	Benfica	Semi-finals	2–2 (a)	(Portugal) Braga	2–1 home, 0–1 away
2010–11	Sporting	Round of 32	3–3 (a)	(Scotland) Rangers	2–2 home, 1–1 away
2010–11	Marítimo	Play-off round	1–5	(Belarus) BATE Borisov	1–2 home, 0–3 away
2011–12	Sporting	Semi-finals	3–4	(Spain) Athletic Club	2–1 home, 1–3 away
2011–12	Braga	Round of 32	1–2	(Turkey) Beşiktaş	0–2 home, 0–1 away
2011–12	Porto	Round of 32	1–6	(England) Manchester City	1–2 home, 0–4 away
2011–12	Nacional	Play-off round	0–3	(England) Birmingham City	0–0 home, 0–3 away
2011–12	Vitória de Guimarães	Play-off round	0–6	(Spain) Atlético Madrid	0–4 home, 0–2 away
2012–13	Benfica	Runners-up	1–2	(England) Chelsea	(Netherlands) Amsterdam Arena, Amsterdam
2012–13	Marítimo	Group stage (3rd)	N/A	(France) Bordeaux, (England) Newcastle United, (Belgium) Club Brugge	
2012–13	Académica	Group stage (3rd)	N/A	(Czech Republic) Viktoria Plzeň, (Spain) Atlético Madrid, (Israel) Hapoel Tel Aviv	
2012–13	Sporting	Group stage (4th)	N/A	(Belgium) Genk, (Switzerland) Basel, (Hungary) Videoton	
2013–14	Benfica	Runners-up	0–0 (2–4 p)	(Spain) Sevilla	(Italy) Juventus Stadium, Turin
2013–14	Porto	Quarter-finals	2–4	(Spain) Sevilla	1–0 home, 1–4 away
2013–14	Vitória de Guimarães	Group stage (3rd)	N/A	(France) Lyon, (Spain) Real Betis, (Croatia) Rijeka	
2013–14	Paços de Ferreira	Group stage (3rd)	N/A	(Italy) Fiorentina, (Ukraine) Dnipro Dnipropetrovsk, (Romania) Pandurii Târgu Jiu	
2013–14	Estoril	Group stage (4th)	N/A	(Spain) Sevilla, (Czech Republic) Slovan Liberec, (Germany) Freiburg	
2013–14	Braga	Play-off round	1–2 (a.e.t.)	(Romania) Pandurii Târgu Jiu	1–0 home, 0–2 (a.e.t.) away
2014–15	Sporting	Round of 32	0–2	(Germany) Wolfsburg	0–0 home, 0–2 away
2014–15	Estoril	Group stage (3rd)	N/A	(Russia) Dynamo Moscow, (Netherlands) PSV Eindhoven, (Greece) Panathinaikos	
2014–15	Rio Ave	Group stage (4th)	N/A	(Ukraine) Dynamo Kyiv, (Denmark) Aalborg AB, (Romania) Steaua București	
2014–15	Nacional	Play-off round	2–5	(Belarus) Dinamo Minsk	2–3 home, 0–2 away
2015–16	Braga	Quarter-finals	1–6	(Ukraine) Shakhtar Donetsk	1–2 home, 0–4 away
2015–16	Porto	Round of 32	0–3	(Germany) Borussia Dortmund	0–1 home, 0–2 away
2015–16	Sporting	Round of 32	1–4	(Germany) Bayer Leverkusen	0–1 home, 1–3 away
2015–16	Belenenses	Group stage (4th)	N/A	(Switzerland) Basel, (Italy) Fiorentina, (Poland) Lech Poznań	
2015–16	Vitória de Guimarães	Third qualifying round	2–6	(Austria) Rheindorf Altach	1–4 home, 1–2 away
2016–17	Braga	Group stage (3rd)	N/A	(Ukraine) Shakhtar Donetsk, (Belgium) Gent, (Turkey) Konyaspor	
2016–17	Arouca	Play-off round	1–3 (a.e.t.)	(Greece) Olympiacos	0–1 home, 1–2 (a.e.t.) away
2016–17	Rio Ave	Third qualifying round	1–1 (a)	(Czech Republic) Slavia Prague	1–1 home, 0–0 away
2017–18	Sporting	Quarter-finals	1–2	(Spain) Atlético Madrid	1–0 home, 0–2 away
2017–18	Braga	Round of 32	1–3	(France) Marseille	1–0 home, 0–3 away
2017–18	Vitória de Guimarães	Group stage (4th)	N/A	(Austria) Red Bull Salzburg, (France) Marseille, (Turkey) Konyaspor	
2017–18	Marítimo	Play-off round	1–3	(Ukraine) Dynamo Kyiv	0–0 home, 1–3 away
2018–19	Benfica	Quarter-finals	4–4 (a)	(Germany) Eintracht Frankfurt	4–2 home, 0–2 away
2018–19	Sporting	Round of 32	1–2	(Spain) Villarreal	0–1 home, 1–1 away
2018–19	Braga	Third qualifying round	3–3 (a)	(Ukraine) Zorya Luhansk	2–2 home, 1–1 away
2018–19	Rio Ave	Second qualifying round	4–5	(Poland) Jagiellonia Białystok	4–4 home, 0–1 away
2019–20	Sporting	Round of 32	4–5 (a.e.t.)	(Turkey) İstanbul Başakşehir	3–1 home, 1–4 (a.e.t.) away
2019–20	Benfica	Round of 32	4–5	(Ukraine) Shakhtar Donetsk	3–3 home, 1–2 away
2019–20	Braga	Round of 32	2–4	(Scotland) Rangers	0–1 home, 2–3 away
2019–20	Porto	Round of 32	2–5	(Germany) Bayer Leverkusen	1–3 home, 1–2 away
2019–20	Vitória de Guimarães	Group stage (4th)	N/A	(England) Arsenal, (Germany) Eintracht Frankfurt, (Belgium) Standard Liège	
2020–21	Benfica	Round of 32	3–4	(England) Arsenal	1–1 home, 2–3 away
2020–21	Braga	Round of 32	1–5	(Italy) Roma	0–2 home, 1–3 away
2020–21	Rio Ave	Play-off round	2–2 (8–9 p)	(Italy) Milan	(Portugal) Estádio do Rio Ave FC, Vila do Conde
2020–21	Sporting	Play-off round	1–4	(Austria) LASK	(Portugal) Estádio José Alvalade, Lisbon
2021–22	Braga	Quarter-finals	2–3 (a.e.t.)	(Scotland) Rangers	1–0 home, 1–3 (a.e.t.) away
2021–22	Porto	Round of 16	1–2	(France) Lyon	0–1 home, 1–1 away
2022–23	Sporting	Quarter-finals	1–2	(Italy) Juventus	1–1 home, 0–1 away
2022–23	Braga	Group stage (3rd)	N/A	(Belgium) Union Saint-Gilloise, (Germany) Union Berlin, (Sweden) Malmö	
2023–24	Benfica	Quarter-finals	2–2 (2–4 p)	(France) Marseille	2–1 home, 0–1 away
2023–24	Sporting	Round of 16	2–3	(Italy) Atalanta	1–1 home, 1–2 away
2023–24	Braga	Knockout round play-offs	5–6	(Azerbaijan) Qarabağ	2–4 home, 3–2 (a.e.t.) away
2024–25	Porto	Knockout round play-offs	3–4	(Italy) Roma	1–1 home, 2–3 away
2024–25	Braga	League Phase	N/A	25th place	
2025–26	Braga	Semi-finals	3–4	(Germany) Freiburg	2–1 home, 1–3 away
2025–26	Porto	Quarter-finals	1–2	(England) Nottingham Forest	1–1 home, 0–1 away
2026–27	Torreense				
2026–27	Benfica				

==== European / UEFA Cup Winners' Cup ====
Season	Team	Progress	Score	Opponent	Venue(s)
1961–62	Leixões	Quarter-finals	2–4	(East Germany) Motor Jena	1–3 home^{b}, 1–1 away
1962–63	Vitória de Setúbal	First round	1–4	(France) Saint-Étienne	1–1 home, 0–3 away
**1963–64**	**Sporting**	**Winners**	3–3, 1–0 playoff	(Hungary) MTK Budapest	(Belgium) Heysel Stadium, Brussels^{c}
1964–65	Sporting	Second round	1–2	(Wales) Cardiff City	1–2 home, 0–0 away
1964–65	Porto	Second round	1–2	(West Germany) 1860 München	0–1 home, 1–1 away
1965–66	Vitória de Setúbal	First round	2–4	(Denmark) AGF	1–2 home, 1–2 away
1966–67	Braga	Second round	2–3	(Hungary) Vasas ETO Győr	2–0 home, 0–3 away
1967–68	Vitória de Setúbal	Second round	3–7	(West Germany) Bayern Munich	1–1 home, 2–6 away
1968–69	Porto	Second round	1–4	(Czechoslovakia) Slovan Bratislava	1–0 home, 0–4 away
1969–70	Académica	Quarter-finals	0–1 (a.e.t.)	(England) Manchester City	0–0 home, 0–1 (a.e.t.) away
1970–71	Benfica	Second round	2–2 (3–5 p)	(East Germany) Vorwärts Berlin	2–0 home, 0–2 away
1971–72	Sporting	Second round	6–6 (a)	(Scotland) Rangers	4–3 home, 2–3 away
1972–73	Sporting	Second round	3–7	(Scotland) Hibernian	2–1 home, 1–6 away
1973–74	Sporting	Semi-finals	2–3	(East Germany) Magdeburg	1–1 home, 1–2 away
1974–75	Benfica	Quarter-finals	1–2	(Netherlands) PSV Eindhoven	1–2 home, 0–0 away
1975–76	Boavista	Second round	1–3	(Scotland) Celtic	0–0 home, 1–3 away
1976–77	Boavista	Second round	3–3 (a)	(Scotland) Celtic	3–1 home, 0–2 away
1977–78	Porto	Quarter-finals	1–3 (a)	(Belgium) Anderlecht	1–0 home, 0–3 away
1978–79	Sporting	First round	0–2	(Czechoslovakia) Baník Ostrava	0–1 home, 0–1 away
1979–80	Boavista	Second round	1–1 (a)	(Soviet Union) Dynamo Moscow	1–1 home, 0–0 away
1980–81	Benfica	Semi-finals	1–2	(East Germany) Carl Zeiss Jena	1–0 home, 0–2 away
1981–82	Porto	Quarter-finals	2–4	(Belgium) Standard Liège	2–2 home, 0–2 away
1982–83	Braga	Preliminary round	1–3	(Wales) Swansea City	1–0 home, 0–3 away
1983–84	Porto	Runners-up	1–2	(Italy) Juventus	(Switzerland) St. Jakob Stadium, Basel
1984–85	Porto	Preliminary round	4–4 (a)	(Wales) Wrexham	4–3 home, 0–1 away
1985–86	Benfica	Quarter-finals	2–2 (a)	(Czechoslovakia) Dukla Prague	2–1 home, 0–1 away
1986–87	Benfica	Second round	1–2	(France) Bordeaux	1–1 home, 0–1 away
1987–88	Sporting	Quarter-finals	2–4	(Italy) Atalanta	2–2 home, 0–2 away
1988–89	Vitória de Guimarães	First round	1–2	(Netherlands) Roda JC Kerkrade	1–0 home, 0–2 away
1989–90	Belenenses	First round	1–4	(France) Monaco	1–1 home, 0–3 away
1990–91	Estrela da Amadora	Second round	1–2	(Belgium) RFC Liège	1–0 home, 0–2 away
1991–92	Porto	Second round	1–3	(England) Tottenham Hotspur	0–0 home, 1–3 away
1992–93	Boavista	Second round	0–2	(Italy) Parma	0–2 home, 0–0 away
1993–94	Benfica	Semi-finals	2–2 (a)	(Italy) Parma	2–1 home, 0–1 away
1994–95	Porto	Semi-finals	1–1 (3–5 p)	(Italy) Sampdoria	0–1 home, 1–0 away
1995–96	Sporting	Second round	2–4	(Austria) Rapid Wien	2–0 home, 0–4 (a.e.t.) away
1996–97	Benfica	Quarter-finals	1–2	(Italy) Fiorentina	0–2 home, 1–0 away
1997–98	Boavista	Second round	0–2	(Ukraine) Shakhtar Donetsk	2–3 home, 1–1 away
1998–99	Braga	Second round	2–3	(Russia) Lokomotiv Moscow	1–0 home, 1–3 away

==== UEFA Conference League ====
Season	Team	Progress	Score	Opponent	Venue(s)
2021–22	Paços de Ferreira	Play-off round	1–3	(England) Tottenham Hotspur	1–0 home, 0–3 away
2021–22	Santa Clara	Play-off round	2–3	(Serbia) Partizan	2–1 home, 0–2 away
2022–23	Braga	Knockout round play-offs	2–7	(Italy) Fiorentina	2–3 home, 0–4 away
2022–23	Gil Vicente	Play-off round	1–6	(Netherlands) AZ Alkmaar	1–2 home, 0–4 away
2022–23	Vitória de Guimarães	Third qualifying round	2–3	(Croatia) Hajduk Split	1–0 home, 1–3 away
2023–24	Arouca	Third qualifying round	3–4	(Norway) Brann	2–1 home, 1–3 away
2023–24	Vitória de Guimarães	Second qualifying round	4–4 (2–4 p)	(Slovenia) Celje	3–2 home, 1–2 (a.e.t.) away
2024–25	Vitória de Guimarães	Round of 16	2–6	(Spain) Real Betis	2–2 home, 0–4 away
2025–26	Santa Clara	Play-off round	1–2	(Republic of Ireland) Shamrock Rovers	1–2 home, 0–0 away
2026–27	Braga				

==== UEFA Intertoto Cup ====
Year	Team	Progress	Score	Opponent	Venue(s)
1995	União de Leiria	Group stage (2nd)	N/A	(Netherlands) Heerenveen, (Denmark) Næstved, (Hungary) Békéscsaba, (Wales) Ton Pentre	
1998	Estrela da Amadora	Third round	2–2 (2–4 p)	(Poland) Ruch Chorzów	1–1 (a.e.t.) home, 1–1 away
2002	Belenenses	Second round	0–3	(Croatia) NK Slaven Belupo	0–1 home, 0–2 away
2002	Santa Clara	Second round	2–9	(Czech Republic) Teplice	1–4 home, 1–5 away
2002	União de Leiria	First round	2–4	(Estonia) Levadia	0–3 (w/o) home, 2–1 away
2004	União de Leiria	Runners-up	0–2 (a.e.t.)	(France) Lille	0–2 (a.e.t.) home, 0–0 away
2005	União de Leiria	Third round	0–3	(Germany) Hamburg	0–1 home, 0–2 away
**2007**	**União de Leiria**	**Co–winners**^{a}	4–2 (a.e.t.)	(Serbia) Hajduk Kula	4–1 (a.e.t.) home, 0–1 away
**2008**	**Braga**	**Winners**^{a}	5–0 (a.e.t.)	(Turkey) Sivasspor	3–0 home, 2–0 away

==== UEFA Super Cup ====
Season	Team	Progress	Score	Opponent	Venue(s)
**1987**	**Porto**	**Winners**	2–0	(Netherlands) Ajax	1–0 home, 1–0 away
2003	Porto	Runners-up	0–1	(Italy) Milan	Stade Louis II, Monaco
2004	Porto	Runners-up	1–2	(Spain) Valencia	Stade Louis II, Monaco
2011	Porto	Runners-up	0–2	(Spain) Barcelona	Stade Louis II, Monaco

==== Inter-Cities Fairs Cup ====
Season	Team	Progress	Score	Opponent	Venue(s)
1961–62	Belenenses	First round	4–6	(Scotland) Hibernian	3–3 home, 1–3 away
1962–63	Porto	First round	2–4	(Socialist Federal Republic of Yugoslavia) Dinamo Zagreb	1–2 home, 0–0 away
1962–63	Belenenses	First round	4–5	(Spain) Barcelona	1–1 home, 1–1 away, 2–3 playoff
1963–64	Belenenses	Second round	3–1	(Italy) Roma	0–1 home, 1–2 away
1963–64	Porto	First round	1–2	(Spain) Atlético Madrid	0–0 home, 1–2 away
1964–65	Leixões	First round	1–4	(Scotland) Celtic	1–1 home, 0–3 away
1964–65	Belenenses	First round	2–3	(Republic of Ireland) Shelbourne	1–1 home, 0–0 away, 1–2 playoff
1965–66	Porto	Second round	1–4	(West Germany) Hannover 96	2–1 home, 0–5 away
1965–66	Sporting	Second round	6–7	(Spain) Espanyol	2–1 home, 3–4 away, 1–2 playoff
1965–66	CUF Barreiro	Second round	2–3	(Italy) Milan	2–0 home, 0–2 away, 0–1 playoff
1966–67	Benfica	Third round	3–4	(East Germany) Lokomotive Leipzig	2–1 home, 1–3 away
1966–67	Vitória de Setúbal	Second round	1–5	(Italy) Juventus	0–2 home, 1–3 away
1966–67	Porto	First round	3–3 (c)	(France) Bordeaux	2–1 home, 1–2 away
1967–68	Sporting	Third round	1–3	(Switzerland) Zürich	1–0 home, 0–3 away
1967–68	Porto	First round	3–4	(Scotland) Hibernian	3–1 home, 0–3 away
1967–68	CUF Barreiro	First round	1–4	(Socialist Federal Republic of Yugoslavia) Vojvodina	1–3 home, 0–1 away
1968–69	Vitória de Setúbal	Quarter-finals	4–6	(England) Newcastle United	3–1 home, 1–5 away
1968–69	Sporting	Second round	1–2	(England) Newcastle United	1–1 home, 0–1 away
1968–69	Académica	First round	1–1 (c)	(France) Lyon	1–0 home, 0–1 away
1968–69	Leixões	First round	1–1 (a)	(Romania) Argeș Pitești	1–1 home, 0–0 away
1969–70	Vitória de Setúbal	Third round	1–2	(West Germany) Hertha Berlin	1–1 home, 0–1 away
1969–70	Sporting	Second round	0–3	(England) Arsenal	0–0 home, 0–3 away
1969–70	Porto	Second round	0–1	(England) Newcastle United	0–0 home, 0–1 away
1969–70	Vitória de Guimarães	Second round	4–8	(England) Southampton	3–3 home, 1–5 away
1970–71	Vitória de Setúbal	Quarter-finals	2–3	(England) Leeds United	1–1 home, 1–2 away
1970–71	Vitória de Guimarães	Second round	2–3	(Scotland) Hibernian	2–1 home, 0–2 away
1970–71	Barreirense	First round	3–6	(Socialist Federal Republic of Yugoslavia) Dinamo Zagreb	2–0 home, 1–6 away

=== Worldwide competitions ===
==== Intercontinental Cup ====
Year	Team	Progress	Score	Opponent	Venue(s)
1961	Benfica	Runners-up	2–7^{d}	(Uruguay) Peñarol	1–0 home, 0–5 away, 1–2 playoff^{e}
1962	Benfica	Runners-up	4–8	(Brazil) Santos	2–5 home, 2–3 away
**1987**	**Porto**	**Winners**	2–1	(Uruguay) Peñarol	(Japan) National Stadium, Tokyo
**2004**	**Porto**	**Winners**	0–0 (8–7 p)	(Colombia) Once Caldas	(Japan) International Stadium, Yokohama

==== FIFA Club World Cup ====
Year	Team	Progress	Score	Opponent(s)	Venue(s)
2025	Benfica	Round of 16	1–4 (a.e.t.)	(England) Chelsea	(United States) Bank of America Stadium, Charlotte
2025	Porto	Group Stage (3rd)	N/A	(Brazil) Palmeiras, (United States) Inter Miami, (Egypt) Al-Ahly	(United States) MetLife Stadium, East Rutherford (United States) Mercedes-Benz Stadium, Atlanta

=== Participations ===
Below is listed every team to have participated in any international competitions organized by UEFA and FIFA.

Continental competitions
UCL	UEFA Champions League, former European Champion Clubs' Cup
UCWC	UEFA Cup Winners' Cup (1960–1999) (Defunct)
UEL	UEFA Europa League, former UEFA Cup
UECL	UEFA Conference League,
USC	UEFA Super Cup
UIC	UEFA Intertoto Cup (1995–2008) (Defunct)
Worldwide competitions
FCWC	FIFA Club World Cup
IC	Intercontinental Cup (1960–2004) (Defunct)

Bold denotes club with the most participations in specified category.

#	Club	Continental competitions							Worldwide competitions			Competitions
#	Club	UCL	UEL	UCWC	UECL	UIC	USC	Total	IC	FCWC	Total	Total
1	Benfica	**45**	24	7	—	—	—	76	**2**	**1**	**3**	**79**
2	Porto	38	18	**8**	—	—	**4**	68	**2**	**1**	**3**	71
3	Sporting	26	**36**	**8**	—	—	—	70	—	—	—	70
4	Braga	3	23	3	2	1	—	32	—	—	—	32
5	Vitória de Guimarães	1	16	1	**3**	—	—	21	—	—	—	21
6	Boavista	3	12	5	—	—	—	20	—	—	—	20
7	Vitória de Setúbal	—	8	3	—	—	—	11	—	—	—	11
8	Marítimo	—	9	—	—	—	—	9	—	—	—	9
9	Belenenses	—	6	1	—	1	—	8	—	—	—	8
10	União de Leiria	—	2	—	—	**5**	—	7	—	—	—	7
11	Paços de Ferreira	1	3	—	1	—	—	5	—	—	—	5
12	Nacional	—	5	—	—	—	—	5	—	—	—	5
13	Rio Ave	—	4	—	—	—	—	4	—	—	—	4
14	Académica	—	2	1	—	—	—	3	—	—	—	3
15	Santa Clara	—	—	—	2	1	—	3	—	—	—	3
16	Leixões	—	1	1	—	—	—	2	—	—	—	2
17	Estoril	—	2	—	—	—	—	2	—	—	—	2
18	Estrela da Amadora	—	—	1	—	1	—	2	—	—	—	2
19	CUF Barreiro	—	1	—	—	—	—	1	—	—	—	1
20	Portimonense	—	1	—	—	—	—	1	—	—	—	1
21	Chaves	—	1	—	—	—	—	1	—	—	—	1
22	Salgueiros	—	1	—	—	—	—	1	—	—	—	1
23	Farense	—	1	—	—	—	—	1	—	—	—	1
24	Beira-Mar	—	1	—	—	—	—	1	—	—	—	1
25	Arouca	—	1	—	—	—	—	1	—	—	—	1
26	Torreense	—	1	—	—	—	—	1	—	—	—	1
27	Gil Vicente	—	—	—	1	—	—	1	—	—	—	1

== Notes ==
- ^aBoth União de Leiria and Braga were one of the co-winners of the UEFA Intertoto Cup in the 2007 and 2008 editions, respectively. However, Braga is the only of both that is the overall winner of the competition in the respective edition, as they progressed further than the other Intertoto sides in the 2008–09 UEFA Cup, unlike União de Leiria in the 2007–08 UEFA Cup.
- ^bGame played in Gera, after visas were denied to the East German players.
- ^cThe play-off match was played in the Bosuilstadion, Antwerp.
- ^dDespite Peñarol winning on goal difference (1–5) on the aggregate in the first two matches, the goal difference was not counted at the time, and since both teams had won 1 match each, a play-off match was necessary to decide the winner.
- ^eThe play-off match was played in the Estadio Centenario, Montevideo.
