= 1987 Intercontinental Cup =

Porto	Peñarol
(Portugal)	(Uruguay)
2	1
- After extra time
- Date: 13 December 1987
- Venue: National Stadium, Tokyo
- Man of the Match: Rabah Madjer (Porto)
- Referee: Franz Wöhrer (Austria)
- Attendance: 45,000

The 1987 Intercontinental Cup was an association football match played on 13 December 1987 between Porto of Portugal, winner of the 1986–87 European Cup, and Peñarol of Uruguay, winner of the 1987 Copa Libertadores.

The match was played at the neutral venue of the National Stadium in Tokyo in front of 45,000 fans. Heavy snow fell throughout the match, making the pitch muddy. Rabah Madjer scored the winning goal in extra time and was named man of the match.

== Match details ==
13 December 1987

Porto (Portugal)	2–1 (a.e.t.)	(Uruguay) Peñarol
Gomes 41'; Madjer 109'	Report	Viera 80'

National Stadium, Tokyo
Attendance: 45,000
Referee: Franz Wöhrer (Austria)

Porto	Peñarol

GK	1	(Poland) Józef Młynarczyk
DF	2	(Portugal) João Pinto (c)
DF	3	(Portugal) Augusto Inácio
DF	4	(Brazil) Geraldão
DF	5	(Portugal) Lima Pereira
MF	6	(Portugal) Rui Barros	(substituted off) 61'
MF	7	(Portugal) Jaime Magalhães
MF	10	(Portugal) António Sousa
MF	11	(Portugal) António André
FW	8	(Algeria) Rabah Madjer
FW	9	(Portugal) Fernando Gomes
Substitutes:
GK	12	(Portugal) Zé Beto
MF	13	(Portugal) Quim	(substituted on) 61'
MF	14	(Portugal) António Frasco
DF	15	(Portugal) Festas
FW	16	(Brazil) Juary
Manager:
(Socialist Federal Republic of Yugoslavia) Tomislav Ivić

GK	1	(Uruguay) Eduardo Pereira (c)
DF	4	(Uruguay) José Herrera	(substituted off) 95'
DF	2	(Uruguay) Marcelo Rotti
DF	3	(Uruguay) Obdulio Trasante
DF	6	(Uruguay) Alfonso Domínguez
MF	8	(Uruguay) Eduardo da Silva
MF	5	(Uruguay) José Perdomo
MF	10	(Uruguay) Ricardo Viera
MF	7	(Uruguay) Daniel Vidal
FW	9	(Uruguay) Diego Aguirre
FW	11	(Uruguay) Jorge Cabrera	(substituted off) 46'
Substitutes:
GK	12	(Uruguay) Óscar Ferro
DF	13	(Uruguay) Jorge Gonçálvez	(substituted on) 95'
FW	14	(Uruguay) Coquito
MF	15	(Uruguay) Gustavo Matosas	(substituted on) 46'
FW	16	(Uruguay) Jorge Villar
Manager:
(Uruguay) Óscar Tabárez

Man of the Match:
Rabah Madjer (FC Porto)
Assistant referees:
Na Yoon-sik (South Korea)
Shizuo Takada (Japan)

== See also ==
- 1986–87 European Cup
- 1987 Copa Libertadores
- FC Porto in international football competitions
