= Jamal Farhan =

Saudi Arabian footballer

Personal information
- Position: Striker

International career
Years	Team	Apps	(Gls)
1982–1983	Saudi Arabia	8	(1)

Jamal Farhan (Arabic: جمال فرحان) is a Saudi Arabian retired footballer. Farhan competed in Saudi Arabia's professional league. He also represented Saudi Arabia internationally, including at the 1982 Asian Games, where the team won the bronze medal. Farhan is best known, however, for receiving a life-time ban from international games by FIFA in 1983, after he assaulted referee Alexis Ponnet during a match with Kuwait at the World Military Cup.

== Career ==
Farhan was selected to represent Saudi Arabia internationally after playing in the country's professional league. He competed in four matches at the 1982 Arabian Gulf Cup, where the country finished fourth, and at four at the 1982 Asian Games, where they won the bronze medal.

== Banning ==
On 28 February 1983, Farhan was playing for Saudi Arabia at the World Military Cup in a match against long-time rivals Kuwait. Kuwait was leading 2–1 in extra time when Farhan was given a red card and sent off for a foul, as a result of "rough play". Farhan sat on the substitute bench for several minutes until play was suspended when his teammate, Samir Abdul Shakour, was also given a red card for the same offence. Farhan then walked back onto the field and punched the match's referee, Alexis Ponnet, in the head, before walking back off again. Ponnet was rendered unconscious and was bleeding from his ear, which was seriously injured. He was taken to hospital where he remained overnight. Following the attack the match was ended with six minutes remaining, giving Kuwait the victory.

Farhan was subsequently banned for life from international games by FIFA, and was also given a two-year ban from local games by the Saudi Federation. Farhan resumed competing locally after his ban was lifted. His actions at the World Military Cup made him popular among some fans, though his career in Saudi Arabia never fully recovered. Farhan gave an interview regarding the incident in 2011, where he expressed remorse for the incident and advised fans not to imitate him.
