= 1985–86 Irish League =

Irish League
- Season: 1985–86
- Champions: Linfield; 38th Irish title
- Matches played: 182
- Goals scored: 503 (2.76 per match)
- Top goalscorer: Trevor Anderson (14 goals)

Location of teams in the Irish League from 1983–1990
Location of Belfast-based teams in the Irish League from 1983–1990

The 1985–86 Irish League was the 85th edition of the Irish League, the highest level of league competition in Northern Irish football. The league consisted of 14 teams, and Linfield won the championship.

== League standings ==
Pos	Team	Pld	W	D	L	GF	GA	GD	Pts	Qualification
1	Linfield (C)	26	20	3	3	59	16	+43	43	Qualification for the European Cup first round
2	Coleraine	26	16	3	7	51	31	+20	35	Qualification for the UEFA Cup first round
3	Ards	26	12	7	7	37	19	+18	31	
4	Glentoran	26	14	3	9	42	26	+16	31	Qualification for the European Cup Winners' Cup first round
5	Crusaders	26	13	5	8	42	34	+8	31	
6	Larne	26	10	8	8	49	34	+15	28	
7	Ballymena United	26	10	7	9	43	30	+13	27	
8	Cliftonville	26	8	9	9	31	34	−3	25	
9	Distillery	26	9	6	11	30	49	−19	24	
10	Portadown	26	10	3	13	22	32	−10	23	
11	Glenavon	26	5	11	10	26	36	−10	21	
12	Bangor	26	6	6	14	31	45	−14	18	
13	Newry Town	26	6	5	15	28	59	−31	17	
14	Carrick Rangers	26	2	6	18	12	58	−46	10	

Source: rsssf.com
(C) Champions

== Results ==
Home \ Away	ARD	BAN	BLM	CRK	CLI	COL	CRU	DIS	GLV	GLT	LRN	LIN	NEW	POR
Ards		2–1	1–0	4–1	4–0	1–0	1–3	4–0	2–0	0–0	1–1	2–1	0–1	3–0
Bangor	1–1		0–2	2–0	1–0	2–1	0–1	2–2	1–1	0–3	2–0	0–0	1–1	0–1
Ballymena United	1–0	2–1		7–1	4–2	1–2	0–0	3–1	3–3	0–1	0–2	1–1	3–1	0–1
Carrick Rangers	0–3	1–1	0–4		0–1	0–2	0–1	0–0	0–4	0–2	2–2	0–4	3–1	0–1
Cliftonville	0–0	4–3	1–0	0–0		2–1	2–1	1–1	1–1	1–1	3–1	0–1	4–0	0–0
Coleraine	1–1	3–1	2–1	2–0	3–1		4–3	0–3	2–2	1–5	7–1	0–2	4–1	4–0
Crusaders	2–1	2–0	0–0	1–0	2–1	2–1		4–1	1–1	4–2	2–2	1–3	3–0	2–1
Distillery	0–2	2–1	1–1	1–1	1–2	1–1	2–1		4–2	0–1	0–6	0–4	2–1	0–3
Glenavon	0–0	2–1	0–2	1–1	1–1	0–1	1–2	0–2		1–0	1–1	0–3	2–2	2–0
Glentoran	2–1	1–4	2–0	2–0	3–2	0–2	1–0	1–2	0–1		1–0	2–3	4–0	1–0
Larne	2–1	5–0	0–0	5–0	1–1	0–2	3–1	0–1	3–0	0–0		1–1	3–0	1–2
Linfield	0–2	2–1	5–1	5–0	2–0	0–1	3–0	5–0	1–0	2–1	3–1		2–1	2–0
Newry Town	0–0	5–1	1–6	0–1	0–0	1–2	2–2	3–2	2–0	0–5	2–6	1–3		1–0
Portadown	2–0	1–4	1–1	2–1	2–1	0–2	2–1	0–1	0–0	2–1	1–2	0–1	0–1	

Source: Irish League Archive
Legend: Blue = home team win; Yellow = draw; Red = away team win.
