= Rabah Madjer =

Algerian footballer (born 1958)

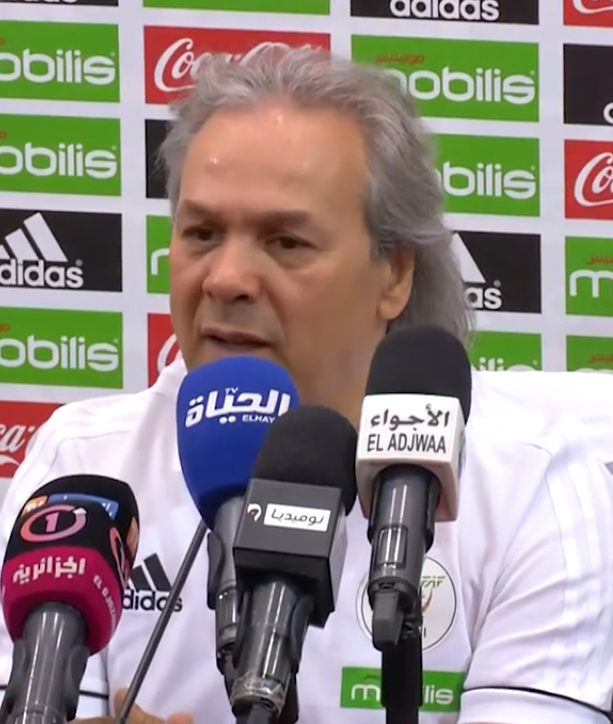
- Madjer in 2018

Personal information
- Full name: Rabah Mustapha Madjer
- Date of birth: 15 December 1958 (age 67)
- Place of birth: Hussein Dey, Algeria
- Height: 1.79 m (5 ft 10 in)
- Position: Striker

Youth career
- 1972–1973: Onalait Hussein Dey
- 1973–1978: NA Hussein Dey

Senior career*
Years	Team	Apps	(Gls)
1978–1983	NA Hussein Dey	94	(58)
1983–1985	Racing Paris	50	(23)
1985	→ Tours (loan)	7	(2)
1985–1991	Porto	108	(50)
1988	→ Valencia (loan)	14	(4)
1991–1992	Qatar SC	9	(6)
Total		282	(143)

International career
1978–1992	Algeria	87	(28)

Managerial career
- 1993–1995: Algeria
- 1995–1997: Porto (youth)
- 1997–1998: Al Sadd
- 1998–1999: Al-Wakrah
- 1999: Algeria
- 2001–2002: Algeria
- 2005–2006: Al-Rayyan
- 2017–2018: Algeria
- 2017–2018: Algeria A'
Medal record
Representing Algeria
Men's football
Africa Cup of Nations
Winner	1990 Algeria
Runner-up	1980 Nigeria
Third place	1988 Morocco
Third place	1984 Ivory Coast
- * Club domestic league appearances and goals

Rabah Mustapha Madjer (Arabic: رابح مصطفى ماجر; born 15 December 1958) is an Algerian former professional footballer who played as a striker.

He reached stardom as a Porto player during the 1980s, being widely regarded as one of the best Algerian football players of all time. In his six-year spell with that club, he won nine major titles, including three national championships and the 1987 European Cup.

One of the most prolific Algeria internationals in number of games and goals, Madjer played in two World Cups with his national team, helping it to its first ever participation in 1982. Having taken up coaching immediately after retiring, he managed several clubs, and also had several spells with the Algeria national team.

== Club career ==
Born in the Algiers district of Hussein Dey of Kabyle origin (Tigzirt), Madjer started his European career in 1983, moving to Racing Club de France football Colombes 92 from local NA Hussein Dey. He stayed there for one and a half seasons, finishing 1984–85 with another French side, Tours FC.

Madjer arrived at FC Porto in 1985–86 and, the following campaign, entered the club's history books in the final of the European Cup against Bayern Munich, scoring the 1–1 equalizer in a memorable final, which eventually ended 2–1 to the Portuguese, and also setting up the winner of Juary. Pelé is believed to have said of this goal: "It would have been the greatest goal I have ever seen, if he had not looked back at it." He also netted in the club's Intercontinental Cup conquest the same year.

After that stellar 1987, Madjer won the Ballon d'or Africain, but was not allowed to compete for the European Golden Ball as he was not born in the region. In the first part of 1987–88 he scored ten times from only 11 appearances. In the summer 1988 he moved to Inter Milan but the medical exams detected a serious thigh muscle injury that the player had in the past and the contract was never officially signed (despite the initial announcement and the official photos already taken).

After being close to transferring to Bayern Munich, Madjer signed for La Liga's Valencia CF in January 1988, returning to his previous team after only a few months for a further three seasons. Johan Cruyff had also attempted to sign Madjer for AFC Ajax at the time the clubs met in the 1987 European Super Cup. Cruyff was unhappy with his own club's board, believing that they leaked details of the transfer which caused Porto to pull out of the deal.

Madjer retired from the game in 1992 at the age of nearly 34, after a brief stint with Qatar SC.

== International career ==
Madjer played for the Algeria national team for 19 years, and was present at the 1982 and 1986 FIFA World Cup finals. He retired as the nation's top goalscorer at 28, in 87 caps, having also won the Africa Cup of Nations in 1990 as the hosts incidentally beat Nigeria twice, in the opening match 5–1 and the final 1–0.

Madjer's most famous goal came in Algeria's 2–1 win over Germany in the 1982 World Cup, when he opened the scoring in the 53rd minute.

== Post-playing career ==
In 1993, Madjer began coaching the Algeria national team but after failing to qualify for two 1994 major competitions, the World Cup and the CAN, he resigned, returning to Porto as a youth coordinator.

He subsequently managed Qatari clubs Al Sadd SC (1997–1998) and Al-Wakrah Sport Club (1998–1999).

After a quick spell with the Algeria national team in 1999, Madjer returned two years later, only to resign with aggravation in the 2002 summer.

In 2005 he was appointed coach of Qatari club Al Rayyan SC.

He controversially returned to the post of Algeria national team coach in October 2017, his first managerial work for over a decade, after Lucas Alcaraz failed to take the team to the 2018 FIFA World Cup. The following June he was dismissed, having won twice in seven games of which six were friendlies.

After his coaching spells, Madjer started a career as a professional analyst in Qatar, for Al-Jazeera Sports (beIN Sports now).

In 2011 he became a UNESCO Goodwill Ambassador.

== Personal life ==
Madjer's son Lotfi is also a footballer and represented Qatar at youth level.

== Career statistics ==
=== Club ===
Appearances and goals by club, season and competition
Club	Season	League			National cup		League cup		Continental		Other		Total	
Club	Season	Division	Apps	Goals	Apps	Goals	Apps	Goals	Apps	Goals	Apps	Goals	Apps	Goals
Hussein Dey	1978–79	National 1					—		6	1	–			
Hussein Dey	1979–80	National 1					—		4	3	–			
Hussein Dey	1980–81	National 1					—		—		–			
Hussein Dey	1981–82	National 1					—		—		–			
Hussein Dey	1982–83	National 1					—		—		–			
Hussein Dey	Total		94	58			0	0	10	4	0	0	104	62
Racing Paris	1983–84	Ligue 2	27	20	5	0	—		—		—		32	20
Racing Paris	1984–85	French Division 1	23	3	5	2	—		—		–		28	5
Racing Paris	Total		50	23	10	2	—		—		–		60	25
Tours (loan)	1984–85	French Division 1	7	2			—		—		–			
Porto	1985–86	Primeira Liga	19	12	2	1	—		—		2 (Note: Appearances in Supertaça)	0	23	13
Porto	1986–87	Primeira Liga	20	6	6	4	—		6 (Note: Appearance(s) in European Cup)	3	1 (Note: Appearance in Intercontinental Cup)	1	33	14
Porto	1987–88	Primeira Liga	11	8	0	0	—		4	4	1	1	16	15
Porto	1988–89	Primeira Liga	24	6	2	3	—		3	1	—		29	10
Porto	1989–90	Primeira Liga	26	13	1	1	—		6 (Note: Appearance(s) in UEFA Cup)	2	—		33	16
Porto	1990–91	Primeira Liga	8	1	0	0	—		4	4	1	0	13	5
Porto	Total		108	46	11	9	0	0	23	14	5	2	138	71
Valencia (loan)	1987–88	La Liga	14	4	0	0	—		—		–		14	4
Qatar	1991–92	Qatar Stars League	9	6			—		—		–		9	6
Career total			282	139										

=== International ===
Scores and results list Algeria's goal tally first, score column indicates score after each Madjer goal.

List of international goals scored by Rabah Madjer
No.	Date	Venue	Opponent	Score	Result	Competition
1	20 June 1980	19 Juin 1965, Oran, Algeria	Sierra Leone	3–1	3–1	1982 World Cup qualification
2	20 July 1980	Dinamo Stadium, Minsk, Soviet Union	Syria	2–0	3–0	1980 Summer Olympics
3	10 April 1981	19 Juin 1965, Oran, Algeria	Mali	3–0	5–1	1982 African Cup of Nations qualification
4	10 April 1981	19 Juin 1965, Oran, Algeria	Mali	4–0	5–1	1982 African Cup of Nations qualification
5	1 May 1981	17 Juin, Constantine, Algeria	Niger	1–0	4–0	1982 World Cup qualification
6	30 August 1981	19 Juin 1965, Oran, Algeria	Upper Volta	1–0	7–0	1982 African Cup of Nations qualification
7	30 August 1981	19 Juin 1965, Oran, Algeria	Upper Volta	2–0	7–0	1982 African Cup of Nations qualification
8	30 October 1981	17 Juin, Constantine, Algeria	Nigeria	2–1	2–1	1982 World Cup qualification
9	25 April 1982	5 Juillet, Algiers, Algeria	Peru	1–1	1–1	Friendly
10	28 April 1982	5 Juillet 1962, Algiers, Algeria	Republic of Ireland	2–0	2–0	Friendly
11	16 June 1982	El Molinón, Gijón, Spain	West Germany	1–0	2–1	1982 FIFA World Cup
12	8 April 1983	5 Juillet 1962, Algiers, Algeria	Benin	4–0	6–2	1984 African Cup of Nations qualification
13	8 April 1983	5 Juillet 1962, Algiers, Algeria	Benin	6–0	6–2	1984 African Cup of Nations qualification
14	26 April 1983	Stade de l'Amitié, Cotonou, Benin	Benin	1–1	1–1	1984 African Cup of Nations qualification
15	10 June 1983	5 Juillet 1962, Algiers, Algeria	Uganda	1–0	3–0	Friendly
16	28 August 1983	5 Juillet 1962, Algiers, Algeria	Senegal	1–0	2–0	1984 African Cup of Nations qualification
17	17 March 1984	Félix Houphouët-Boigny, Abidjan, Ivory Coast	Egypt	1–0	3–1	1984 African Cup of Nations
18	13 July 1985	5 Juillet 1962, Algiers, Algeria	Zambia	2–0	2–0	1986 World Cup qualification
19	18 August 1985	5 Juillet 1962, Algiers, Algeria	Kenya	3–0	3–0	1986 African Cup of Nations qualification
20	6 October 1985	El Menzah, Tunis, Tunisia	Tunisia	1–1	1–4	1986 World Cup qualification
21	18 October 1985	5 Juillet 1962, Algiers, Algeria	Tunisia	1–0	3–0	1986 World Cup qualification
22	14 March 1986	Alexandria Stadium, Alexandria, Egypt	Cameroon	1–0	2–3	1986 African Cup of Nations
23	27 March 1987	5 Juillet 1962, Algiers, Algeria	Tunisia	1–0	1–0	1988 African Cup of Nations qualification
24	7 January 1989	19 Mai 1956, Annaba, Algeria	Zimbabwe	3–0	3–0	1990 World Cup qualification
25	25 June 1989	National Sports Stadium, Harare, Zimbabwe	Zimbabwe	2–0	2–1	1990 World Cup qualification
26	25 August 1989	19 Mai 1956, Annaba, Algeria	Ivory Coast	1–0	1–0	1990 World Cup qualification
27	2 March 1990	5 Juillet 1962, Algiers, Algeria	Nigeria	1–0	5–1	1990 African Cup of Nations
28	2 March 1990	5 Juillet 1962, Algiers, Algeria	Nigeria	2–0	5–1	1990 African Cup of Nations

== Honours ==
Hussein Dey

- Algerian Cup: 1978–79
- African Cup Winners' Cup: Runner-up 1978

Porto

- Primeira Liga: 1985–86, 1987–88, 1989–90
- Taça de Portugal: 1987–88, 1990–91
- Supertaça Cândido de Oliveira: 1986, 1990
- European Cup: 1986–87
- European Super Cup: 1987
- Intercontinental Cup: 1987

International

- Africa Cup of Nations: 1990
- Afro-Asian Cup of Nations: 1991
- African Games: 1978

Individual

- Best goal scorer of the 1987–88 European Cup with four goals.
- Africa Cup of Nations Team of the Tournament: 1982, 1990
- African Footballer of the Year: 1987
- Intercontinental Cup: Most Valuable Player of the Match Award 1987
- Best player of the Africa Cup of Nations: 1990
- MasterCard African Team of the 20th Century: 1998
- IFFHS World Player of the Century #62: 2000
- Arab Footballer of the 20th century: 2004
- Algerian Footballer of the 20th century: 2009 (with Lakhdar Belloumi)
- Algerian Footballer of the Year: Several awards
- IFFHS All Time Algeria Men's Dream Team
- African Footballer of the 20th century: Fifth place
- Golden Foot Legends Award: 2011
- IFFHS Legends: 2016
