= Alexis Ponnet =

Belgian football referee (born 1939)

- Born: 9 March 1939 (age 87); Brussels, Belgium

Domestic
Years	League	Role
1972–1989	Belgian First Division	Referee

International
Years	League	Role
1975–1989	FIFA-listed	Referee

Alexis Ponnet (born 9 March 1939 in Brussels) is a former Belgian football referee. Ponnet is best known for supervising two matches in the 1982 FIFA World Cup in Spain and one in the 1986 FIFA World Cup in Mexico. He also refereed the European Cup final in 1987 between Porto and Bayern Munich. He also refereed two UEFA European Football Championship in 1984 and 1988.

In February 1983, Ponnet was rendered unconscious and hospitalized overnight after Saudi Arabian player Jamal Farhan punched him in the head during the World Military Cup between Saudi Arabia and Kuwait. Ponnet had given him a red card minutes earlier. Farhan was subsequently banned from international games for life by FIFA.

Preceded by European Cup Final 1986 (France) Michel Vautrot	European Cup Referees; Final 1987 (Belgium) Alexis Ponnet	Succeeded by European Cup Final 1988 (Italy) Luigi Agnolin
