= Per Steffensen =

Danish footballer (born 1963)

Personal information
- Date of birth: 27 February 1963 (age 63)
- Place of birth: Copenhagen, Denmark
- Position: Midfielder

Senior career*
Years	Team	Apps	(Gls)
1981–1984	Hvidovre IF		
1984–1989	Brøndby IF	119	(13)
1989–1991	FC Twente	30	(2)
1991	→ Ikast FS (loan)	13	(0)
1991–1992	Odense Boldklub	12	(0)
1992–1994	Hvidovre IF		

International career
1987–1988	Denmark	6	(0)
- * Club domestic league appearances and goals

Per Steffensen (born 27 February 1963) is a Danish former professional footballer who played as a midfielder.

== Honours ==
=== Club ===
Hvidovre IF

- Danish 1st Division: 1981

Brøndby IF

- Danish 1st Division: 1985, 1987, 1988
- Danish League Cup: 1984
