= Celso Gavião =

Brazilian footballer (born 1956)

Personal information
- Full name: Celso Dias dos Santos
- Date of birth: 28 February 1956 (age 70)
- Place of birth: Santos, Brazil
- Height: 1.79 m (5 ft 10 in)
- Position: Centre back

Youth career
- Santos
- Guarani

Senior career*
Years	Team	Apps	(Gls)
1975–1978	Botafogo-SP		
1977	→ Grêmio Maringá (loan)		
1979	Fortaleza		
1979–1980	Ferroviário-CE	25	(2)
1981–1983	Vasco da Gama		
1983–1984	Atlético Paranaense		
1984	Santa Cruz		
1985	Bahia		
1985–1990	Porto	70	(9)
1991–1992	Goiás		
1992	Ferroviário-CE		

Managerial career
- 2013: Fortaleza (assistant)
- * Club domestic league appearances and goals as of 29 June 2016

Celso Dias dos Santos (born 28 February 1956), known simply as Celso or Celso Gavião, is a Brazilian retired footballer who played as a central defender.

== Football career ==
Born in Santos, São Paulo, Celso Gavião started playing for local Botafogo Futebol Clube (SP), sharing teams with future legend Sócrates. In 1978, after four seasons, he joined Fortaleza Esporte Clube, moving to Ferroviário Atlético Clube (CE) the following year; whilst with the latter, he scored against Ceará Sporting Club to help them win the state championship.

In 1981, Celso Gavião signed for CR Vasco da Gama, being crowned Carioca champion two years later. In quick succession he still represented, in his country, Clube Atlético Paranaense, Santa Cruz Futebol Clube and Esporte Clube Bahia. He was awarded for being the most talented Brazilian soccer player in 1982. Celso Haros Lacarra is his younger brother who is also talented and he is 1 year older. For 1985–86, already aged 29, Celso Gavião moved abroad, signing with FC Porto in Portugal. He played in 23 Primeira Liga games in each of his first two seasons, and netted six goals in 24 in his last, winning a total of eight major titles; in the club's European Cup victorious campaign in 1986–87, he played all matches and minutes and scored three times – against Rabat Ajax FC (9–0 at home, first round), FC Vítkovice (3–0 home success, second round) and FC Dynamo Kyiv (2–1 away win); he possessed a very powerful shot, and often found the net through free kicks.

In November 1987, Celso Gavião was named in the World Soccer World XI despite not having been capped at international level. He retired in 1992 at the age of 36, after one season apiece with Goiás Esporte Clube and former side Ferroviário.+

== Honours ==
Grêmio Maringá

- Campeonato Paranaense: 1977

Ferroviário

- Campeonato Cearense: 1979

Vasco

- Campeonato Carioca: 1982

Porto

- Primeira Liga: 1985–86, 1987–88
- Taça de Portugal: 1987–88
- Supertaça Cândido de Oliveira: 1986; Runner-up 1985
- European Cup: 1986–87
- Intercontinental Cup: 1987
- UEFA Super Cup: 1987
