= Juary =

Brazilian footballer and manager

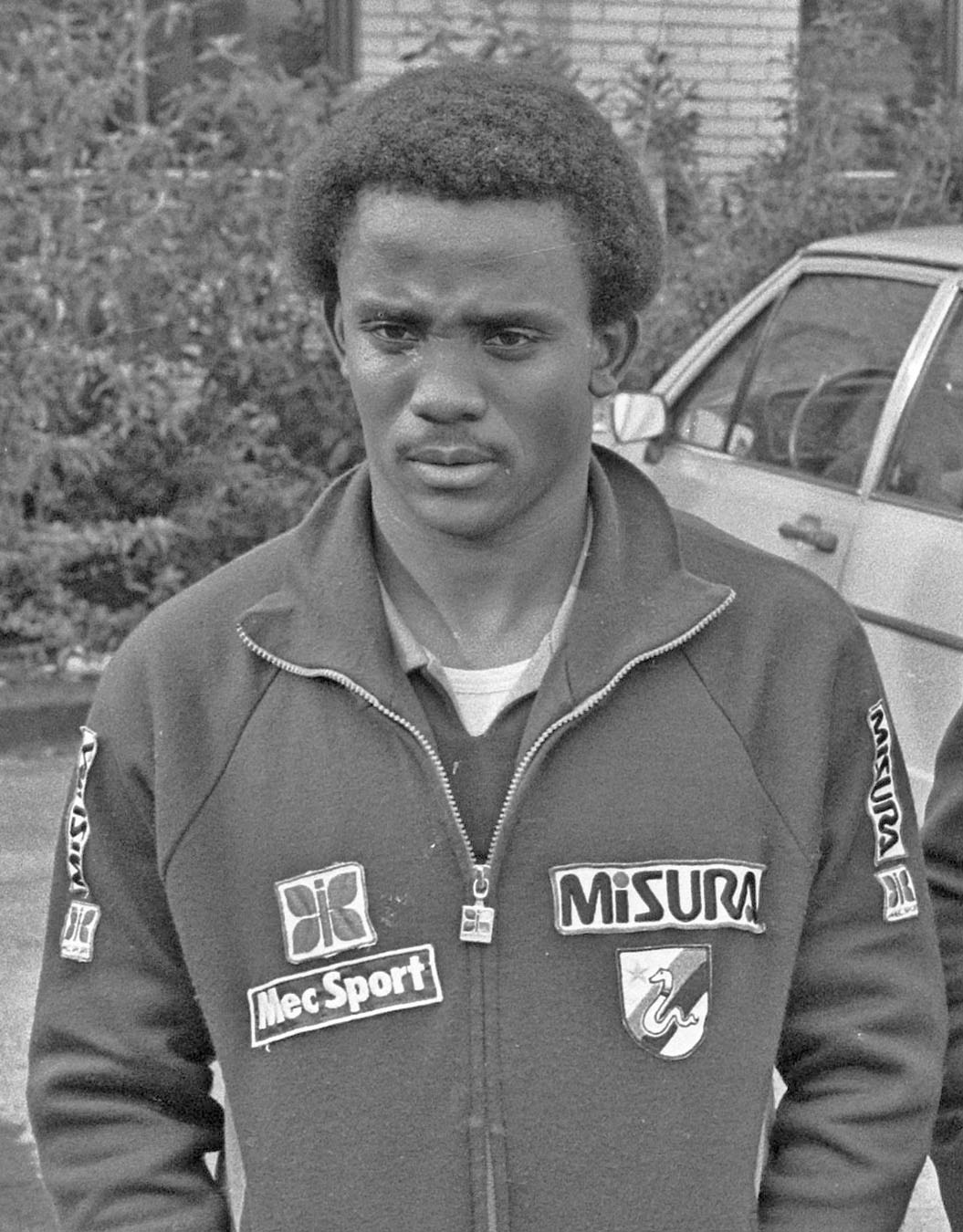
- Juary in 1982

Personal information
- Full name: Juary Jorge Santos Filho
- Date of birth: 16 June 1959 (age 67)
- Place of birth: São João de Meriti, Brazil
- Height: 1.69 m (5 ft 7 in)
- Position: Striker

Team information
- Current team: Náutico (manager)

Senior career*
Years	Team	Apps	(Gls)
1976–1979	Santos	41	(18)
1979–1980	Leones Negros	25	(5)
1980–1982	Avellino	34	(13)
1982–1983	Internazionale	21	(2)
1983–1984	Ascoli	27	(5)
1984–1985	Cremonese	19	(2)
1985–1988	Porto	40	(11)
1988	Portuguesa		
1988–1989	Boavista	2	(0)
1989	Portuguesa		
1989–1990	Santos	6	(0)
1990–1991	Moto Club	?	(3)
1991–1992	Vitória-ES		
Total		213	(59)

International career
1979	Brazil	2	(0)

Managerial career
- 2009: Banzi
- 2010–2011: Aversa Normanna
- 2011–2013: Sestri Levante
- 2023–: Náutico
- * Club domestic league appearances and goals

Juary Jorge dos Santos Filho (Portuguese pronunciation: [ʒwɐˈɾi]; born 16 June 1959), known simply as Juary, is a Brazilian former professional footballer who played as a striker, and currently a manager. He is the current head coach of Campeonato Roraimense club Náutico.

== Club career ==
Born in São João de Meriti, Rio de Janeiro, Juary started his career at Santos FC. As an 18-year-old, he was important to the club's 1978 conquest of the Paulistan League. He had his first stint abroad the following year, with Mexico's Leones Negros de Guadalajara.

In 1980, Juary embarked on an Italian adventure when he moved to U.S. Avellino. Over the course of two seasons, Juary scored regularly, helping the club to secure its permanence in Serie A. His performance caught the eye of Inter Milan, and Juary signed for the team for the 1982–83 season. Regrettably Juary struggled to fit in with the Milanese team, and left at the end of the season after having scored only two goals. He then moved to Ascoli Calcio 1898, where he recovered some of his previous form, and U.S. Cremonese before moving to Portugal.

During his time in Italy, Juary became popular for celebrating his goals with a 'corner dance'. The idea came to him after a journalist asked him how he intended to celebrate, and he replied 'I'll come up with something'.

Juary moved to FC Porto in the 1985 summer, serving as backup to club great Fernando Gomes. There, he achieved the greatest moment in his career when, on 27 May 1987, he came from the bench to net the decisive 2–1 against FC Bayern Munich in the 1986–87 European Cup final.

However, Juary left Porto in the ensuing season, returning to his country with Associação Portuguesa de Desportos and moving back to Santos the following year, where he was not able to reproduce his previous form, finally retiring in 1990 with Moto Club, in São Luís, Maranhão.

In the 2000s, Juary returned to Italy to work as a youth coach at Avellino, Potenza and Napoli.

Juary was appointed as head coach of Eccellenza Basilicata amateurs Banzi in February 2009, but left only after two games (both ended in a loss), citing personal reasons that required his presence in Brazil.

In January 2010 Juary signed, also as main coach, at Lega Pro Seconda Divisione side S.F. Aversa Normanna, replacing Raffaele Sergio.

In 2021 Juary moved back to his native Brazil to work in Santos' youth setup, eventually managing the club's U13s up until 2021.

On 16 November 2023, Juary was appointed manager of Campeonato Roraimense club Náutico.

== International career ==
Juary played twice for Brazil in 1979 (aged 20), going scoreless in the process: his debut came on 26 July against Bolivia, and he also appeared in a friendly with Argentina on 2 August. He was a member of the squad that took part at the Copa América that year, reaching the semi-finals.

== Honours ==
Porto

- Primeira Divisão: 1985–86, 1987–88
- Taça de Portugal: 1987–88
- European Cup: 1986–87
- European Super Cup: 1987
- Intercontinental Cup: 1987
