= 1986–87 European Cup =

European football tournament

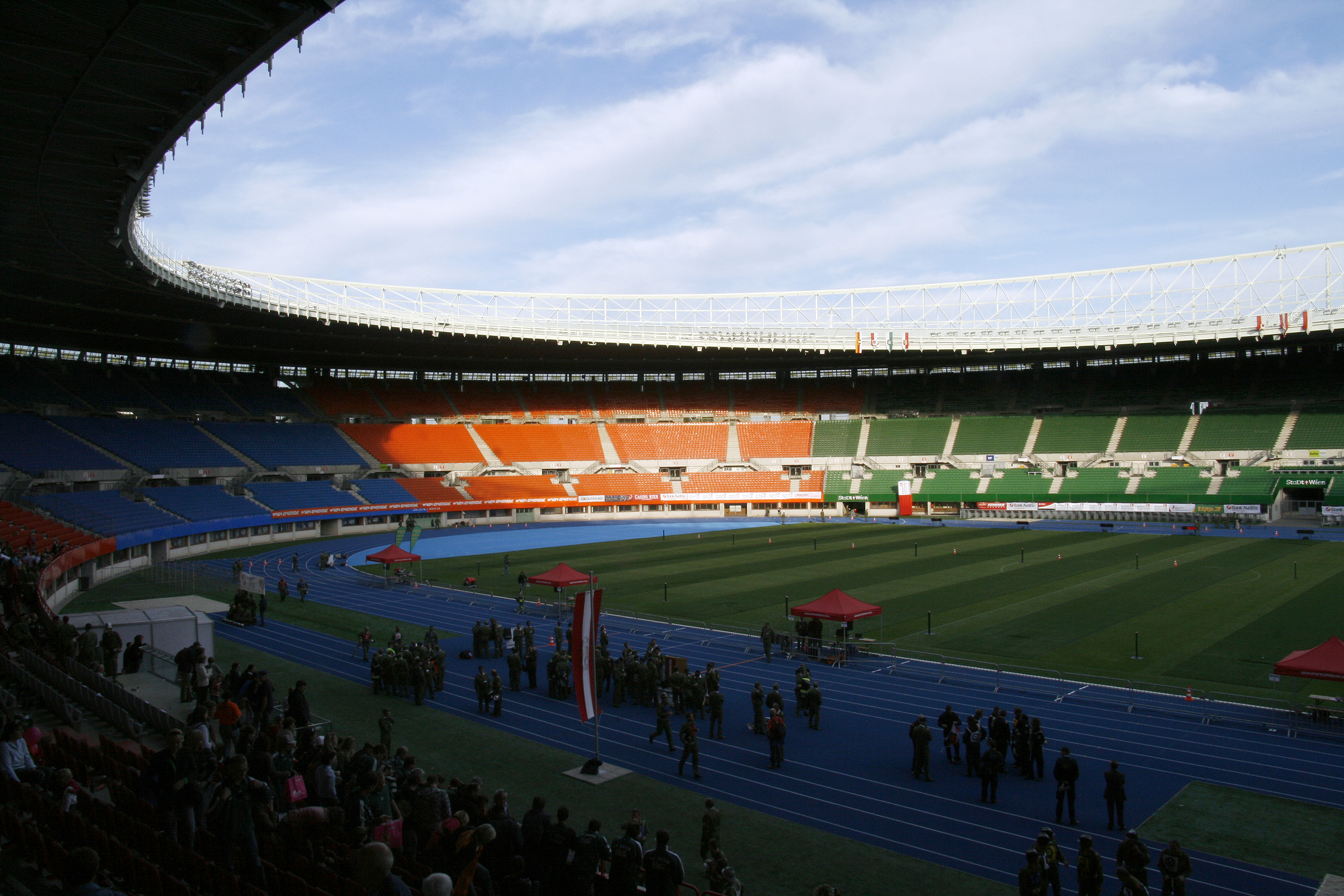
- The Praterstadion in Vienna hosted the final.

Tournament details
- Dates: 17 September 1986 – 27 May 1987
- Teams: 31

Final positions
- Champions: (Portugal) Porto (1st title)
- Runners-up: (West Germany) Bayern Munich

Tournament statistics
- Matches played: 57
- Goals scored: 163 (2.86 per match)
- Attendance: 1,959,041 (34,369 per match)
- Top scorer(s): Borislav Cvetković (Red Star Belgrade); 7 goals

The 1986–87 season was the 32nd season of the European Cup, Europe's premier club football competition. The tournament was won by Porto, who came from behind in the final against Bayern Munich to give a Portuguese club its first title since 1962.

Steaua București, the defending champions, were eliminated by Anderlecht in the second round, having received a bye to reach that stage of the tournament due to the absence of the English champions (Liverpool), as the ban on English clubs in European competitions was now in its second season.

== Teams ==
(Albania) Dinamo Tirana (1st)	Austria Wien (1st)	(Belgium) Anderlecht (1st)	(Bulgaria) Beroe (1st)
(Cyprus) APOEL (1st)	(Czechoslovakia) Vítkovice (1st)	(Denmark) Brøndby (1st)	(Finland) HJK (1st)
(France) Paris Saint-Germain (1st)	(East Germany) BFC Dynamo (1st)	(West Germany) Bayern Munich (1st)	(Greece) Panathinaikos (1st)
(Hungary) Budapesti Honvéd (1st)	(Iceland) Valur (1st)	(Republic of Ireland) Shamrock Rovers (1st)	(Italy) Juventus (1st)
(Luxembourg) Avenir Beggen (1st)	(Malta) Rabat Ajax (1st)	(Netherlands) PSV Eindhoven (1st)	(Northern Ireland) Linfield (1st)
(Norway) Rosenborg (1st)	(Poland) Górnik Zabrze (1st)	(Portugal) Porto (1st)	(Romania) Steaua București (1st)^{TH}
(Scotland) Celtic (1st)	(Spain) Real Madrid (1st)	(Sweden) Örgryte (1st)	(Switzerland) Young Boys (1st)
(Turkey) Beşiktaş (1st)	(Soviet Union) Dynamo Kyiv (1st)	(Socialist Federal Republic of Yugoslavia) Red Star Belgrade (2nd)	

== Bracket ==
First round
(Netherlands) PSV Eindhoven	0	0	0
(West Germany) Bayern Munich	2	0	2
(Luxembourg) Avenir Beggen	0	0	0
Austria Wien	3	3	6
(Belgium) Anderlecht	2	1	3
(Poland) Górnik Zabrze	0	1	1
(Norway) Rosenborg	1	1	2
(Northern Ireland) Linfield	0	1	1
(Socialist Federal Republic of Yugoslavia) Crvena zvezda	3	1	4
(Greece) Panathinaikos	0	2	2
(Switzerland) Young Boys	1	0	1
(Spain) Real Madrid	0	5	5
(Italy) Juventus	7	4	11
(Iceland) Valur	0	0	0
(France) Paris Saint-Germain	2	0	2
(Czechoslovakia) Vítkovice	2	1	3
(Portugal) Porto	9	1	10
(Malta) Rabat Ajax	0	0	0
(Denmark) Brøndby	4	2	6
(Hungary) Honvéd	1	2	3
(Sweden) Örgryte	2	1	3
(East Germany) BFC Dynamo	3	4	7
(Turkey) Beşiktaş	2	1	3
(Albania) Dinamo Tirana	0	0	0
(Cyprus) APOEL (a)	1	2	3
(Finland) HJK	0	3	3
(Republic of Ireland) Shamrock Rovers	0	0	0
(Scotland) Celtic	1	2	3
(Bulgaria) Beroe	1	0	1
(Soviet Union) Dynamo Kyïv	1	2	3

Second round
(West Germany) Bayern Munich	2	1	3
Austria Wien	0	1	1
(Belgium) Anderlecht	3	0	3
(Romania) Steaua București	0	1	1
(Norway) Rosenborg	0	1	1
(Socialist Federal Republic of Yugoslavia) Crvena zvezda	3	4	7
(Spain) Real Madrid (p.)	1	0	1(3)
(Italy) Juventus	0	1	1(1)
(Czechoslovakia) Vítkovice	1	0	1
(Portugal) Porto	0	3	3
(Denmark) Brøndby	2	1	3
(East Germany) BFC Dynamo	1	1	2
(Turkey) Beşiktaş	w
(Cyprus) APOEL	o
(Scotland) Celtic	1	1	2
(Soviet Union) Dynamo Kyïv	1	3	4

Quarter-finals
(West Germany) Bayern Munich	5	2	7
(Belgium) Anderlecht	0	2	2
(Socialist Federal Republic of Yugoslavia) Crvena zvezda	4	0	4
(Spain) Real Madrid (a)	2	2	4
(Portugal) Porto	1	1	2
(Denmark) Brøndby	0	1	1
(Turkey) Beşiktaş	0	0	0
(Soviet Union) Dynamo Kyïv	5	2	7

Semi-finals
(West Germany) Bayern Munich	4	0	4
(Spain) Real Madrid	1	1	2
(Portugal) Porto	2	2	4
(Soviet Union) Dynamo Kyïv	1	1	2

Final
(West Germany) Bayern Munich	1
(Portugal) Porto	2

== First round ==
Team 1	Agg.	Team 2	1st leg	2nd leg
Paris Saint-Germain (France)	2–3	(Czechoslovakia) Vítkovice	2–2	0–1
Porto (Portugal)	10–0	(Malta) Rabat Ajax	9–0	1–0
Brøndby (Denmark)	6–3	(Hungary) Budapest Honvéd	4–1	2–2
Örgryte (Sweden)	3–7	(East Germany) BFC Dynamo	2–3	1–4
Beşiktaş (Turkey)	3–0	(Albania) Dinamo Tirana	2–0	1–0
APOEL (Cyprus)	3–3 (a)	(Finland) HJK	1–0	2–3
Shamrock Rovers (Republic of Ireland)	0–3	(Scotland) Celtic	0–1	0–2
Beroe (Bulgaria)	1–3	(Soviet Union) Dynamo Kyiv	1–1	0–2
PSV Eindhoven (Netherlands)	0–2	(West Germany) Bayern Munich	0–2	0–0
Avenir Beggen (Luxembourg)	0–6	Austria Wien	0–3	0–3
Anderlecht (Belgium)	3–1	(Poland) Górnik Zabrze	2–0	1–1
Rosenborg (Norway)	2–1	(Northern Ireland) Linfield	1–0	1–1
Red Star Belgrade (Socialist Federal Republic of Yugoslavia)	4–2	(Greece) Panathinaikos	3–0	1–2
Young Boys (Switzerland)	1–5	(Spain) Real Madrid	1–0	0–5
Juventus (Italy)	11–0	(Iceland) Valur	7–0	4–0

=== First leg ===
17 September 1986
19:30

Paris Saint-Germain (France)	2–2	(Czechoslovakia) Vítkovice
Halilhodžić 19'; Pilorget 58' (pen.)	Report	Kovačík 8'; Šourek 22'

Parc des Princes, Paris
Attendance: 14,865
Referee: Victoriano Sánchez Arminio (Spain)

17 September 1986
20:30

Porto (Portugal)	9–0	(Malta) Rabat Ajax
Gomes 20', 49', 69', 83'; Elói 25'; Madjer 54'; André 60', 65'; Celso 80'	Report

Estádio dos Arcos, Vila do Conde
Attendance: 8,000
Referee: Joaquín Ramos Marcos (Spain)

17 September 1986
18:00

Brøndby (Denmark)	4–1	(Hungary) Budapest Honvéd
J. Jensen 13'; Olsen 56'; Østergaard 59'; Christensen 82'	Report	Détári 19'

Brøndby Stadium, Brøndby
Attendance: 6,438
Referee: Esa Palsi (Finland)

17 September 1986
18:00

Örgryte (Sweden)	2–3	(East Germany) BFC Dynamo
Hellström 62'; Samuelsson 69'	Report	Pastor 19'; Thom 75'; Doll 88'

Nya Ullevi, Gothenburg
Attendance: 5,114
Referee: John Blankenstein (Netherlands)

17 September 1986
14:30

Beşiktaş (Turkey)	2–0	(Albania) Dinamo Tirana
Doğan 50'; Çalımbay 74' (pen.)	Report

Ali Sami Yen Stadyumu, Istanbul
Attendance: 15,814
Referee: Klaus Scheurell (East Germany)

17 September 1986
19:30

APOEL (Cyprus)	1–0	(Finland) HJK
Moores 15' (pen.)	Report

Makario Stadium, Nicosia
Attendance: 12,000
Referee: Todor Kolev (Bulgaria)

17 September 1986
16:45

Shamrock Rovers (Republic of Ireland)	0–1	(Scotland) Celtic
	Report	MacLeod 82'

Glenmalure Park, Dublin
Attendance: 19,000
Referee: Henk van Ettekoven (Netherlands)

17 September 1986
18:30

Beroe (Bulgaria)	1–1	(Soviet Union) Dynamo Kyiv
Bonchev 89' (pen.)	Report	Mykhaylychenko 50'

Beroe Stadium, Stara Zagora
Attendance: 16,280
Referee: Gerasimos Germanakos (Greece)

17 September 1986
18:30

PSV Eindhoven (Netherlands)	0–2	(West Germany) Bayern Munich
	Report	Mathy 80', 90'

Philips Sportpark, Eindhoven
Attendance: 26,750
Referee: Bob Valentine (Scotland)

17 September 1986
18:30

Avenir Beggen (Luxembourg)	0–3	Austria Wien
	Report	Drabits 14'; Frind 67'; Polster 71'

Stade rue Henri Dunant, Beggen
Attendance: 474
Referee: Renzo Peduzzi (Switzerland)

17 September 1986
19:00

Anderlecht (Belgium)	2–0	(Poland) Górnik Zabrze
Guðjohnsen 27'; Scifo 37' (pen.)	Report

Constant Vanden Stock, Brussels
Attendance: 9,359
Referee: Carlos Silva Valente (Portugal)

17 September 1986
18:00

Rosenborg (Norway)	1–0	(Northern Ireland) Linfield
Brandhaug 4'	Report

Lerkendal Stadion, Trondheim
Attendance: 3,258
Referee: Kjartan Ólofsson (Iceland)

17 September 1986
18:00

Red Star Belgrade (Socialist Federal Republic of Yugoslavia)	3–0	(Greece) Panathinaikos
Musemić 45'; Cvetković 55'; Ǵurovski 66'	Report

Stadion Crvena Zvezda, Belgrade
Attendance: 85,000
Referee: Alexis Ponnet (Belgium)

17 September 1986
19:00

Young Boys (Switzerland)	1–0	(Spain) Real Madrid
Bamert 2'	Report

Wankdorf Stadium, Bern
Attendance: 32,000
Referee: Paolo Casarin (Italy)

17 September 1986

Juventus (Italy)	7–0	(Iceland) Valur
Laudrup 19', 22', 65'; Serena 43'; Cabrini 60'; Vignola 77'; Briaschi 78'	Report

Stadio Comunale, Turin
Attendance: 18,518
Referee: Edgar Azzopardi (Malta)

=== Second leg ===
1 October 1986
15:30

Vítkovice (Czechoslovakia)	1–0	(France) Paris Saint-Germain
Šourek 68'	Report

Městský, Ostrava
Attendance: 8,605
Referee: John Martin (England)

Vítkovice won 3–2 on aggregate.

1 October 1986
13:30

Rabat Ajax (Malta)	0–1	(Portugal) Porto
	Report	Sousa 80'

National Stadium, Ta' Qali
Attendance: 2,000
Referee: Dragiša Komadinić (Yugoslavia)

Porto won 10–0 on aggregate.

1 October 1986
18:00

Budapest Honvéd (Hungary)	2–2	(Denmark) Brøndby
Détári 43'; Kovács 60'	Report	C. Nielsen 66'; Jørgensen 88'

Bozsik József Stadion, Budapest
Attendance: 7,031
Referee: Ivan Timoshenko (Soviet Union)

Brøndby won 6–3 on aggregate.

1 October 1986
13:30

BFC Dynamo (East Germany)	4–1	(Sweden) Örgryte
Pastor 10'; Backs 26'; Thom 65'; Ernst 82'	Report	Hellström 35'

Dynamo-Stadion in Sportforum, East Berlin
Attendance: 15,000
Referee: Kurt Röthlisberger (Switzerland)

Dynamo Berlin won 7–3 on aggregate.

1 October 1986
14:30

Dinamo Tirana (Albania)	0–1	(Turkey) Beşiktaş
	Report	Tekin 7'

Qemal Stafa Stadium, Tirana
Attendance: 17,500
Referee: Lajos Hartmann (Hungary)

Beşiktaş won 3–0 on aggregate.

1 October 1986
18:00

HJK (Finland)	3–2	(Cyprus) APOEL
Valla 3'; Rissanen 38'; Valvee 69'	Report	Ioannou 35'; Prokopis 63'

Stadikka, Helsinki
Attendance: 3,247
Referee: Janusz Eksztajn (Poland)

3–3 on aggregate; APOEL won on away goals.

1 October 1986
18:30

Celtic (Scotland)	2–0	(Republic of Ireland) Shamrock Rovers
Johnston 27', 62'	Report

Celtic Park, Glasgow
Attendance: 27,272
Referee: Håkan Lundgren (Sweden)

Celtic won 3–0 on aggregate.

1 October 1986
19:00

Dynamo Kyiv (Soviet Union)	2–0	(Bulgaria) Beroe
Blokhin 7'; Yakovenko 46'	Report

Republican Stadium, Kyiv
Attendance: 98,000
Referee: Vojtech Christov (Czechoslovakia)

Dynamo Kyiv won 3–1 on aggregate.

1 October 1986
19:00

Bayern Munich (West Germany)	0–0	(Netherlands) PSV Eindhoven
	Report

Olympiastadion, Munich
Attendance: 32,000
Referee: Michel Vautrot (France)

Bayern Munich won 2–0 on aggregate.

1 October 1986
18:00

Austria Wien	3–0	(Luxembourg) Avenir Beggen
Ogris 42'; Polster 60'; Steinkogler 78'	Report

Stadion Lehen, Salzburg
Attendance: 3,500
Referee: Bela Szabo (Hungary)

Austria Wien won 6–0 on aggregate.

1 October 1986
16:00

Górnik Zabrze (Poland)	1–1	(Belgium) Anderlecht
Cyroń 56'	Report	Guðjohnsen 80'

Stadion Zabrze, Zabrze
Attendance: 19,300
Referee: Stadion Górnik (Austria)

Anderlecht won 3–1 on aggregate.

1 October 1986
18:30

Linfield (Northern Ireland)	1–1	(Norway) Rosenborg
McKeown 62' (pen.)	Report	Sørloth 37'

Windsor Park, Belfast
Attendance: 3,464
Referee: Frans Van Den Wijngaert (Belgium)

Rosenborg won 2–1 on aggregate.

1 October 1986
19:30

Panathinaikos (Greece)	2–1	(Socialist Federal Republic of Yugoslavia) Red Star Belgrade
Saravakos 8'; C. Dimopoulos 31'	Report	Cvetković 89'

Spyros Louis, Athens
Attendance: 57,708
Referee: Luigi Agnolin (Italy)

Red Star Belgrade won 4–2 on aggregate.

1 October 1986
20:000

Real Madrid (Spain)	5–0	(Switzerland) Young Boys
Santillana 36'; Valdano 72'; Sánchez 78'; Butragueño 80', 82'	Report

Santiago Bernabéu, Madrid
Attendance: 75,000
Referee: Karl-Josef Assenmacher (West Germany)

Real Madrid won 5–1 on aggregate.

1 October 1986
16:05

Valur (Iceland)	0–4	(Italy) Juventus
	Report	Platini 10', 86'; Laudrup 31', 36'

Laugardalsvöllur, Reykjavík
Attendance: 6,050
Referee: Ib Nielsen (Denmark)

Juventus won 11–0 on aggregate.

== Second round ==
Team 1	Agg.	Team 2	1st leg	2nd leg
Vítkovice (Czechoslovakia)	1–3	(Portugal) Porto	1–0	0–3
Brøndby (Denmark)	3–2	(East Germany) BFC Dynamo	2–1	1–1
Beşiktaş (Turkey)	(w/o)^{1}	(Cyprus) APOEL	–	–
Celtic (Scotland)	2–4	(Soviet Union) Dynamo Kyiv	1–1	1–3
Bayern Munich (West Germany)	3–1	Austria Wien	2–0	1–1
Anderlecht (Belgium)	3–1	(Romania) Steaua București	3–0	0–1
Rosenborg (Norway)	1–7	(Socialist Federal Republic of Yugoslavia) Red Star Belgrade	0–3	1–4
Real Madrid (Spain)	1–1 (3–1 p)	(Italy) Juventus	1–0	0–1

^{1} APOEL withdrew for political reasons.

=== First leg ===
22 October 1986
14:30

Vítkovice (Czechoslovakia)	1–0	(Portugal) Porto
Šourek 24' (pen.)	Report

Městský, Ostrava
Attendance: 7,261
Referee: George Smith (Scotland)

22 October 1986
17:30

Brøndby (Denmark)	2–1	(East Germany) BFC Dynamo
M. Schulz 27' (o.g.); Vilfort 47'	Report	Rohde 88'

Brøndby Stadium, Brøndby
Attendance: 5,401
Referee: David F. T. Syme (Scotland)

22 October 1986
19:30

Celtic (Scotland)	1–1	(Soviet Union) Dynamo Kyiv
Johnston 80'	Report	Yevtushenko 17'

Celtic Park, Glasgow
Attendance: 47,858
Referee: Emilio Soriano Aladrén (Spain)

22 October 1986
19:00

Bayern Munich (West Germany)	2–0	Austria Wien
Flick 44'; Matthäus 73' (pen.)	Report

Olympiastadion, Munich
Attendance: 42,000
Referee: Vojtech Christov (Czechoslovakia)

22 October 1986
19:00

Anderlecht (Belgium)	3–0	(Romania) Steaua București
Krncevic 75', 84'; Janssen 77'	Report

Constant Vanden Stock, Brussels
Attendance: 27,500
Referee: Paolo Casarin (Italy)

22 October 1986
18:00

Rosenborg (Norway)	0–3	(Socialist Federal Republic of Yugoslavia) Red Star Belgrade
	Report	Mrkela 12'; Cvetković 83', 87'

Lerkendal Stadion, Trondheim
Attendance: 7,623
Referee: Patrick Daly (Republic of Ireland)

22 October 1986
20:00

Real Madrid (Spain)	1–0	(Italy) Juventus
Butragueño 21'	Report

Santiago Bernabéu Stadium, Madrid
Attendance: 80,000
Referee: Bob Valentine (Scotland)

=== Second leg ===
5 November 1986
20:30

Porto (Portugal)	3–0	(Czechoslovakia) Vítkovice
André 5'; Celso 26'; Futre 82'	Report

Estádio das Antas, Porto
Attendance: 55,000
Referee: Marcel Van Langenhove (Belgium)

Porto won 3–1 on aggregate.

5 November 1986
12:30

BFC Dynamo (East Germany)	1–1	(Denmark) Brøndby
Ernst 12'	Report	Vilfort 8'

Dynamo-Stadion in Sportforum, Berlin
Attendance: 11,000
Referee: Gerasimos Germanakos (Greece)

Brøndby won 3–2 on aggregate.

5 November 1986
19:00

Dynamo Kyiv (Soviet Union)	3–1	(Scotland) Celtic
Blokhin 12'; Yakovenko 72'; Yevtushenko 89'	Report	McGhee 49'

Republican Stadium, Kyiv
Attendance: 92,000
Referee: Horst Brummeier (Austria)

Dynamo Kyiv won 4–2 on aggregate.

5 November 1986
18:30

Austria Wien	1–1	(West Germany) Bayern Munich
Polster 54'	Report	Wohlfarth 34'

Praterstadion, Vienna
Attendance: 47,000
Referee: Alexis Ponnet (Belgium)

Bayern Munich won 3–1 on aggregate.

5 November 1986

Steaua București (Romania)	1–0	(Belgium) Anderlecht
Bölöni 58'	Report

Stadionul Steaua, Bucharest
Attendance: 21,000
Referee: Bruno Galler (Switzerland)

Anderlecht won 3–1 on aggregate.

5 November 1986
16:00

Red Star Belgrade (Socialist Federal Republic of Yugoslavia)	4–1	(Norway) Rosenborg
Cvetković 8', 9'; Mrkela 23', 25'	Report	Sørloth 88'

Stadion Crvena Zvezda, Belgrade
Attendance: 8,846
Referee: Ihsan Türe (Turkey)

Red Star Belgrade won 7–1 on aggregate.

5 November 1986

Juventus (Italy)	1–0 (a.e.t.)	(Spain) Real Madrid
Cabrini 9'	Report
Penalties
Brio (penalty missed); Vignola (penalty scored); Manfredonia (penalty missed); Favero (penalty missed)	1–3	(penalty missed) Sánchez; (penalty scored) Butragueño; (penalty scored) Valdano; (penalty scored) Juanito

Stadio Comunale, Turin
Attendance: 58,123
Referee: Dieter Pauly (West Germany)

1–1 on aggregate; Real Madrid won on penalties.

== Quarter-finals ==
Team 1	Agg.	Team 2	1st leg	2nd leg
Porto (Portugal)	2–1	(Denmark) Brøndby	1–0	1–1
Beşiktaş (Turkey)	0–7	(Soviet Union) Dynamo Kyiv	0–5	0–2
Bayern Munich (West Germany)	7–2	(Belgium) Anderlecht	5–0	2–2
Red Star Belgrade (Socialist Federal Republic of Yugoslavia)	4–4 (a)	(Spain) Real Madrid	4–2	0–2

=== First leg ===
4 March 1987
20:30

Porto (Portugal)	1–0	(Denmark) Brøndby
Madjer 71'	Report

Estádio das Antas, Porto
Attendance: 47,000
Referee: Gérard Biguet (France)

14 March 1987 (Note: The Beşiktaş v Dynamo Kyiv match, originally scheduled on 4 March 1987, was postponed due to snow.)
14:30

Beşiktaş (Turkey)	0–5	(Soviet Union) Dynamo Kyiv
	Report	Belanov 17'; Blokhin 41', 51'; Yevtushenko 47', 61'

İzmir Atatürk Stadium, İzmir (Note: Beşiktaş played their home match at İzmir Atatürk Stadium, İzmir, instead of their regular stadium BJK İnönü Stadium, Istanbul, due to snow.)
Attendance: 38,585
Referee: Dušan Krchňák (Czechoslovakia)

4 March 1987

Bayern Munich (West Germany)	5–0	(Belgium) Anderlecht
Rummenigge 15'; Pflügler 27'; Hoeneß 69', 87'; Wohlfarth 89'	Report

Olympiastadion, Munich
Attendance: 16,000
Referee: Victoriano Sánchez Arminio (Spain)

4 March 1987
17:30

Red Star Belgrade (Socialist Federal Republic of Yugoslavia)	4–2	(Spain) Real Madrid
Ǵurovski 7'; Đurović 12'; Cvetković 39'; Janković 84' (pen.)	Report	Sánchez 66', 87' (pen.)

Stadion Crvena Zvezda, Belgrade
Attendance: 74,184
Referee: Keith Hackett (England)

=== Second leg ===
18 March 1987
18:00

Brøndby (Denmark)	1–1	(Portugal) Porto
Steffensen 36'	Report	Juary 74'

Idrætsparken, Copenhagen
Attendance: 22,000
Referee: Lajos Németh (Hungary)

Porto won 2–1 on aggregate.

18 March 1987
19:00

Dynamo Kyiv (Soviet Union)	2–0	(Turkey) Beşiktaş
Blokhin 50'; Yevtushenko 70'	Report

Republican Stadium, Kyiv
Attendance: 90,000
Referee: Bep Thomas (Netherlands)

Dynamo Kyiv won 7–0 on aggregate.

18 March 1987
19:00

Anderlecht (Belgium)	2–2	(West Germany) Bayern Munich
Lozano 31'; Nilis 72'	Report	Wohlfarth 56'; Matthäus 88'

Constant Vanden Stock Stadium, Brussels
Attendance: 27,000
Referee: Ronald Bridges (Wales)

Bayern Munich won 7–2 on aggregate.

18 March 1987
20:00

Real Madrid (Spain)	2–0	(Socialist Federal Republic of Yugoslavia) Red Star Belgrade
Butragueño 17'; Sanchís 64'	Report

Santiago Bernabéu, Madrid
Attendance: 82,000
Referee: Siegfried Kirschen (East Germany)

4–4 on aggregate; Real Madrid won on away goals.

== Semi-finals ==
Team 1	Agg.	Team 2	1st leg	2nd leg
Porto (Portugal)	4–2	(Soviet Union) Dynamo Kyiv	2–1	2–1
Bayern Munich (West Germany)	4–2	(Spain) Real Madrid	4–1	0–1

=== First leg ===
8 April 1987
19:15

Bayern Munich (West Germany)	4–1	(Spain) Real Madrid
Augenthaler 11'; Matthäus 30' (pen.), 52' (pen.); Wohlfarth 37'	Report	Butragueño 44'

Olympiastadion, Munich
Attendance: 74,000
Referee: Bob Valentine (Scotland)

8 April 1987
21:30

Porto (Portugal)	2–1	(Soviet Union) Dynamo Kyiv
Futre 48'; André 57' (pen.)	Report	Yakovenko 74'

Estádio das Antas, Porto
Attendance: 76,000
Referee: Jan Keizer (Netherlands)

=== Second leg ===
22 April 1987
20:00

Real Madrid (Spain)	1–0	(West Germany) Bayern Munich
Santillana 28'	Report

Santiago Bernabéu, Madrid
Attendance: 100,000
Referee: Michel Vautrot (France)

As per the decision by referee Michel Vautrot, the match was interrupted only a few minutes in with the score still tied at 0–0 due to Real Madrid fans throwing objects, including golf balls, onto the pitch. Play resumed 10 minutes later and completed without interruption. At a disciplinary hearing a few days later, UEFA punished Real Madrid with one match behind closed doors and an additional one-match stadium ban, both enforced during Real Madrid's 1987–88 European Cup participation.
Bayern Munich won 4–2 on aggregate.

22 April 1987
19:00

Dynamo Kyiv (Soviet Union)	1–2	(Portugal) Porto
Mykhaylychenko 13'	Report	Celso 3'; Gomes 11'

Republican Stadium, Kyiv
Attendance: 100,067
Referee: Ronald Bridges (Wales)

Porto won 4–2 on aggregate.

== Final ==
27 May 1987

Bayern Munich (West Germany)	1–2	(Portugal) Porto
Kögl 24'	Report MatchCentre	Madjer 79'; Juary 81'

Prater Stadium, Vienna
Attendance: 57,500
Referee: Alexis Ponnet (Belgium)

== Top scorers ==
Rank	Name	Team	Goals
1	(Socialist Federal Republic of Yugoslavia) Borislav Cvetković	(Socialist Federal Republic of Yugoslavia) Red Star Belgrade	7
2	(Soviet Union) Oleg Blokhin	(Soviet Union) Dynamo Kyiv	5
2	(Spain) Emilio Butragueño	(Spain) Real Madrid	5
2	(Portugal) Fernando Gomes	(Portugal) Porto	5
2	(Denmark) Michael Laudrup	(Italy) Juventus	5
2	(Soviet Union) Vadym Yevtushenko	(Soviet Union) Dynamo Kyiv	5
7	(Portugal) António André	(Portugal) Porto	4
7	(West Germany) Lothar Matthäus	(West Germany) Bayern Munich	4
7	(West Germany) Roland Wohlfarth	(West Germany) Bayern Munich	4
10	(Brazil) Celso	(Portugal) Porto	3
10	(Scotland) Mo Johnston	(Scotland) Celtic	3
10	(Algeria) Rabah Madjer	(Portugal) Porto	3
10	(Socialist Federal Republic of Yugoslavia) Mitar Mrkela	(Socialist Federal Republic of Yugoslavia) Red Star Belgrade	3
10	(Austria) Toni Polster	Austria Wien	3
10	(Mexico) Hugo Sánchez	(Spain) Real Madrid	3
10	(Czechoslovakia) Jiří Šourek	(Czechoslovakia) Vítkovice	3
10	(Soviet Union) Pavlo Yakovenko	(Soviet Union) Dynamo Kyiv	3
