= Festas =

Portuguese footballer

Personal information
- Full name: João Manuel Vinhas Festas
- Date of birth: 9 October 1967 (age 59)
- Place of birth: Vila do Conde, Portugal
- Height: 1.85 m (6 ft 1 in)
- Position: Defender

Youth career
- –1982: Leixões
- 1982–1985: Porto

Senior career*
Years	Team	Apps	(Gls)
1985–1987	Porto	9	(0)
1987–1988	Varzim	17	(0)
1988–1989	Rio Ave	22	(3)
1989–1990	Vianense	24	(0)
1990–1991	Ovarense	33	(1)
1991–1992	Tirsense	13	(0)
1992–1994	Nacional	58	(1)
1994–1995	Leça	27	(2)
1995–1996	Beira-Mar	10	(1)
1997–1998	Leixões	27	(2)
Total		240	(10)

International career
1983	Portugal U16	1	(0)
1985–1986	Portugal U18	9	(2)
1987–1989	Portugal U21	6	(0)
- * Club domestic league appearances and goals

João Manuel Vinhas Festas (born 9 October 1967), simply known as Festas, is a former Portuguese professional footballer.

== Career statistics ==
=== Club ===
Club	Season	League			Cup		Other		Total	
Club	Season	Division	Apps	Goals	Apps	Goals	Apps	Goals	Apps	Goals
Porto	1985–86	Primeira Divisão	3	0	0	0	2 (Note: Appearances in the 1985 Supertaça)	0	5	0
Porto	1986–87	Primeira Divisão	6	0	1	0	0	0	7	0
Porto	Total		9	0	1	0	2	0	12	0
Varzim	1987–88	Primeira Divisão	17	0	1	0	0	0	18	0
Rio Ave	1988–89	Segunda Divisão	22	3	0	0	0	0	22	3
Vianense	1989–90	Segunda Divisão	24	0	3	0	0	0	27	0
Ovarense	1990–91	Segunda Divisão	33	1	7	0	0	0	40	1
Tirsense	1991–92	Segunda Divisão	13	0	0	0	0	0	13	0
Nacional	1992–93	Segunda Divisão	30	1	1	0	0	0	31	1
Nacional	1993–94	Segunda Divisão	28	0	1	0	0	0	29	0
Nacional	Total		58	1	2	0	0	0	60	1
Leça	1994–95	Segunda Divisão	27	2	4	0	0	0	31	2
Beira-Mar	1995–96	Segunda Divisão	10	1	2	0	0	0	12	1
Leixões	1997–98	Segunda Divisão	27	2	1	0	0	0	28	2
Career total			240	10	21	0	2	0	263	10
