= António André =

Portuguese footballer

Personal information
- Full name: António dos Santos Ferreira André
- Date of birth: 24 December 1957 (age 68)
- Place of birth: Vila do Conde, Portugal
- Height: 1.71 m (5 ft 7 in)
- Position: Defensive midfielder

Youth career
- 1971–1976: Rio Ave

Senior career*
| Years | Team | Apps | (Gls) |
| 1976–1977 | Rio Ave | | |
| 1977–1979 | Ribeirão | | |
| 1979–1984 | Varzim | 136 | (30) |
| 1984–1995 | Porto | 276 | (23) |
| Total | | 412 | (53) |

International career
| 1985–1992 | Portugal | 20 | (1) |
- * Club domestic league appearances and goals

António dos Santos Ferreira André (born 24 December 1957) is a Portuguese former professional footballer who played as a defensive midfielder.

He was best known for his lengthy spell at Porto, winning several domestic and continental accolades with the club.

== Club career ==
At the age of 13, André entered hometown Rio Ave's youth system, as he complemented the sporting activities with fishing in the high sea, in which his family was involved; it was also one of the main activities in Vila do Conde, where he was born.

André signed his first professional contract in 1978, also up north with Varzim, although he continued to work with his family. Still, he produced four solid seasons at the side, scoring a career-high in the Primeira Liga ten goals in 1983–84.

Under the advice of legendary manager José Maria Pedroto, Porto signed André in summer 1984. After initial difficulties due to injuries, he was firmly installed in the team's central midfield, remaining there for nine consecutive years and helping them to win 18 titles.

In his last two years, André was challenged for position by the player who regarded him as his role model, Paulinho Santos, and appeared less. He retired at the age of 37, winning the Primeira Liga in his last season as Porto were coached by Bobby Robson, in what would be the first of five national titles in a row for the club.

André retired in June 1995 with 379 games in the top division, scoring 41 goals and adding to that 48 matches with four goals in European competition. He then continued to work with Porto as assistant for several coaches, and also as a scout; he was chosen by Portuguese sports newspaper Record as one of the best 100 Portuguese football players ever.

== International career ==
André earned 20 caps for the Portugal national team, making his debut on 30 January 1985 in a friendly with Romania as the latter won 3–2 in Lisbon. He represented the nation at the 1986 FIFA World Cup, playing in the entire 1–0 win against England and also appearing against Poland, but Portugal exited in the group stage.

António André: International goals
| No. | Date | Venue | Opponent | Score | Result | Competition |
|---|---|---|---|---|---|---|
| 1 | 29 March 1989 | Estádio José Alvalade (1956), Lisbon, Portugal | Angola | 3–0 | 6–0 | Friendly |

== Personal life ==
André's son, André, was also a footballer and a midfielder. He also played for Porto, Varzim and Portugal.

== Honours ==
Porto

- Primeira Liga: 1984–85, 1985–86, 1987–88, 1989–90, 1991–92, 1992–93, 1994–95
- Taça de Portugal: 1987–88, 1990–91, 1993–94
- Supertaça Cândido de Oliveira: 1984, 1986, 1990, 1993, 1994
- European Cup: 1986–87
- UEFA Super Cup: 1987
- Intercontinental Cup: 1987

== Bibliography ==
- Dias, Rui – Record – 100 Melhores do Futebol Português – Volume I (Record – The 100 best of Portuguese Football); EDISPORT, 2002
