= List of Valencia CF players =

Valencia CF is an association football club based in Valencia, Spain, that plays in La Liga. The club was formed in 1919, and played its first competitive match on 21 May 1919, when it lost 1–0 to Valencia Gimnástico. They were promoted to La Liga for the first time in 1931–32, finishing 7th at the first attempt, and have only spent one season (1986–87) outside the top division since then. They are one of the most successful clubs in Spanish football, having won La Liga on six occasions and the Copa del Rey eight times. They also won the Supercopa de España in 1999 and its predecessor, the Copa Eva Duarte, in 1949. They have also had significant success on the European stage, winning the UEFA Cup, and its predecessor the Inter-Cities Fairs Cup, on three occasions. In addition to this, they have claimed two UEFA Super Cups, the UEFA Cup Winners' Cup in 1980, and the UEFA Intertoto Cup in 1998. They were defeated finalists in the UEFA Champions League in both 2000 and 2001.

Ricardo Arias holds the record for most overall appearances, having played 501 times between 1976 and 1992. Waldo is the all-time top scorer with 160.

The list includes notable footballers who have played for Valencia. Generally, this means players that have played at least 100 league games and/or have reached international status.

== Key ==
*	Club record holder
¤	Played their full career at Valencia

- Players whose name is in italics currently play for the club.
- The years are the first and last calendar years in which the player was registered to the club.
- Appearances and goals comprise only those in league matches; that is those in La Liga and the Segunda División.

== List of players ==
Name	Nat	Pos^{[NB]}	Valencia career	Apps	Goals	Notes
Luis Pasarín	(Spain)	Defender	1929–1935	46	0	
Bertolí	(Spain)	Midfielder	1933–1945	–	–	
Carlos Iturraspe	(Spain)	Midfielder	1933–1946	168	5	
János Aknai	(Hungary)	Goalkeeper	1934–1935	1	0	
Gaspar Rubio	(Spain)	Forward	1934–1935	–	–	
Juan Ramón	(Spain)	Defender	1934–1952	–	–	1941 Copa del Generalísimo winning captain
Hilario	(Spain)	Midfielder	1936	0	0	
Mundo*	(Spain)	Forward	1939–1950	210	186	^{[Pichichi]}^{[A]} 1949 Copa del Generalísimo winning captain
Guillermo Gorostiza	(Spain)	Forward	1940–1946	115	72	
Epi	(Spain)	Forward	1940–1949	198	78	
Ignacio Eizaguirre	(Spain)	Goalkeeper	1940–1950	197	0	^{[Zamora]}
Vicente Asensi	(Spain)	Midfielder	1940–1955	275	33	
Silvestre Igoa	(Spain)	Forward	1941–1950	168	81	
Pasieguito	(Spain)	Midfielder	1942–1944; 1945–1946; 1948–1959	240+	65+	
Simón Lecue	(Spain)	Midfielder	1942–1946	77	4	
Salvador Monzó	(Spain)	Defender	1942–1955	–	–	1954 Copa del Generalísimo winning captain
Antonio Fuertes	(Spain)	Midfielder	1943–1959	186	58	
Antonio Puchades	(Spain)	Midfielder	1945–1958¤	256	4	
Seguí	(Spain)	Midfielder	1945–1959	–	83	
Manuel Badenes	(Spain)	Forward	1950–1956	97	90	
Faas Wilkes	(Netherlands)	Forward	1953–1956	62	38	
José Manuel Pesudo	(Spain)	Goalkeeper	1955–1961; 1966–1971	127	0	
Manuel Mestre	(Spain)	Defender	1955–1969¤	323	–	
Esteban Areta	(Spain)	Defender	1956–1957	26	5	
Goyo	(Spain)	Goalkeeper	1956–1962	–	–	^{[Zamora]}
Vicente Piquer	(Spain)	Defender	1954–1965	197	4	
Ricardo	(Spain)	Forward	1957–1960	–	–	^{[Pichichi]}
Joel Antônio Martins	(Brazil)	Forward	1958–1961	–	–	
José Aveiro	(Paraguay)	Forward	1959–1961	32	15	
Héctor Núñez	(Uruguay)	Forward	1959–1965	154	61	
Vicente Guillot	(Spain)	Forward	1959–1970	153	50	
Roberto Gil	(Spain)	Midfielder	1959–1971¤	–	–	1967 Copa del Generalísimo winning captain
Waldo*	(Brazil)	Forward	1961–1970	216	115	^{[Pichichi]}^{[B]}
Paquito	(Spain)	Midfielder	1963–1972	212	26	
Abelardo	(Spain)	Goalkeeper	1965–1974	–	–	^{[Zamora]}
Juan Sol	(Spain)	Defender	1965–1975; 1979–1981	237	14	
José Claramunt	(Spain)	Midfielder	1965–1978¤	294	55	
Enrique Collar	(Spain)	Forward	1969–1970	15	1	
Fernando Barrachina	(Spain)	Defender	1969–1977	146	1	
Óscar Valdez	(Spain)	Forward	1971–1978	167	42	
Kurt Jara	(Austria)	Midfielder	1973–1975	57	11	
Salif Keïta	(Mali)	Forward	1973–1976	74	23	
Raimundo Aguilera	(Paraguay)	Goalkeeper	1974–1975	–	–	
Juan Planelles	(Spain)	Midfielder	1974–1976	50	12	
Johnny Rep	(Netherlands)	Midfielder	1975–1977	55	22	
Enrique Saura	(Spain)	Midfielder	1975–1985	306	37	
Mario Kempes*	(Argentina)	Forward	1976–1981; 1982–1984	184	116	^{[Pichichi]}^{[A]}
José Carrete	(Spain)	Defender	1976–1983	208	2	1979 Copa del Rey winning captain
Javier Subirats	(Spain)	Midfielder	1976–1990	291	30	
Ricardo Arias*	(Spain)	Defender	1976–1992	411	3	^{[C]}
Eufemio Cabral	(Paraguay)	Midfielder	1977–1979	35	0	
Carlos Diarte	(Paraguay)	Forward	1977–1979	71	18	
José Luis Manzanedo	(Spain)	Goalkeeper	1977–1985	–	–	^{[Zamora]}
Miguel Tendillo	(Spain)	Defender	1977–1986	208	17	1980 European Cup Winners' Cup winning captain
José Manuel Sempere	(Spain)	Goalkeeper	1977–1995¤	301	0	
Rainer Bonhof	(West Germany)	Midfielder	1978–1980	61	10	
Darío Felman	(Argentina)	Forward	1978–1983	121	18	
Daniel Solsona	(Spain)	Midfielder	1978–1983	139	26	
Pablo Rodríguez	(Spain)	Midfielder	1978–1984	104	8	
Fernando Morena	(Uruguay)	Forward	1980–1981	31	16	
Frank Arnesen	(Denmark)	Midfielder	1981–1983	32	13	
Kurt Welzl	(Austria)	Forward	1981–1983	41	12	
Roberto	(Spain)	Midfielder	1981–1986; 1990–1995	258	58	
Santiago Idígoras	(Spain)	Forward	1982–1983	16	4	
Voro	(Spain)	Defender	1982–1993	216	8	
Fernando Giner	(Spain)	Defender	1982–1995	300	12	
Juan José Urruti	(Argentina)	Forward	1983–1986	74	8	
Fernando	(Spain)	Midfielder	1983–1998	459	118	
Wilmar Cabrera	(Uruguay)	Forward	1984–1985	54	22	
Quique Sánchez Flores	(Spain)	Defender	1984–1994	272	23	
Paco Camarasa	(Spain)	Defender	1985–2000¤	266	7	
Miguel Bossio	(Uruguay)	Midfielder	1986–1990	96	0	
Nando	(Spain)	Defender	1987–1992	140	7	
Rabah Madjer	(Algeria)	Forward	1988	14	4	
Luis Flores	(Mexico)	Forward	1988–1989	36	6	
José Ochotorena	(Spain)	Goalkeeper	1988–1992	105	0	^{[Zamora]}
Eloy	(Spain)	Forward	1988–1995	203	37	
José Molina	(Spain)	Goalkeeper	1989–1994	0	0	
Lyuboslav Penev	(Bulgaria)	Forward	1989–1995	167	67	
Rommel Fernández	(Panama)	Forward	1991–1993	21	2	
Leonardo	(Brazil)	Midfielder	1991–1993	70	7	
Juan Sánchez	(Spain)	Forward	1991–1994; 1999–2004	142	30	
Sergio Barila	(Equatorial Guinea)	Defender	1991–1995	0	0	
Miodrag Belodedici	(Romania)	Defender	1992–1994	49	0	
Álvaro Cervera	(Spain)	Midfielder	1992–1995	82	5	
Gaizka Mendieta*	(Spain)	Midfielder	1992–2001	230	44	^{[D]} 1999 Supercopa de España winning captain
Juan Antonio Pizzi	(Spain)	Forward	1993–1994	19	4	
Predrag Mijatović	(Federal Republic of Yugoslavia)	Forward	1993–1996	104	56	
Javi Navarro	(Spain)	Defender	1993–2000	41	0	
Víctor Aristizábal	(Colombia)	Forward	1994	7	0	
Juan Carlos	(Spain)	Defender	1994–1995	14	0	
Oleg Salenko	(Russia)	Forward	1994–1995	25	7	
Mazinho	(Brazil)	Midfielder	1994–1996	71	0	
Vicente Engonga	(Spain)	Midfielder	1994–1997	69	2	
Jorge Otero	(Spain)	Defender	1994–1997	84	0	
Enrique Romero	(Spain)	Defender	1994–1997	91	5	
Andoni Zubizarreta	(Spain)	Goalkeeper	1994–1998	152	0	
Viola	(Brazil)	Forward	1995–1996	30	10	
Iván Campo	(Spain)	Defender	1995–1997	25	1	
Patxi Ferreira	(Spain)	Defender	1995–1997	60	4	
José Ignacio	(Spain)	Midfielder	1995–1997	61	1	
David Albelda	(Spain)	Midfielder	1995–2013	351	6	2004 UEFA Cup winning captain 2004 UEFA Super Cup winning captain
Valeri Karpin	(Russia)	Midfielder	1996–1997	36	6	
Leandro Machado	(Brazil)	Forward	1996–1997	23	8	
Gabriel Moya	(Spain)	Midfielder	1996–1997	35	7	
Romário	(Brazil)	Forward	1996–1997	11	5	
Fernando Cáceres	(Argentina)	Defender	1996–1998	51	0	
Javier Farinós	(Spain)	Midfielder	1996–2000	115	10	
Claudio López	(Argentina)	Forward	1996–2000	126	47	
Goran Vlaović	(Croatia)	Forward	1996–2000	73	17	
Miguel Ángel Angulo	(Spain)	Midfielder	1996–2009	313	43	
Marcelinho Carioca	(Brazil)	Midfielder	1997	11	1	
José del Solar	(Peru)	Midfielder	1997–1998	12	0	
Ariel Ortega	(Argentina)	Midfielder	1997–1998	29	9	
Moussa Saïb	(Algeria)	Midfielder	1997–1998	14	0	
Juanfran	(Spain)	Defender	1997–1999	41	0	
Guillermo Morigi	(Argentina)	Midfielder	1997–1999	15	1	
Gerard	(Spain)	Midfielder	1997–2000	45	4	
Luis Milla	(Spain)	Midfielder	1997–2001	79	1	
Jocelyn Angloma	(France)	Defender	1997–2002	120	5	
Miroslav Đukić	(Federal Republic of Yugoslavia)	Defender	1997–2003	157	4	
Amedeo Carboni*	(Italy)	Defender	1997–2006	245	1	^{[E]}
Curro Torres	(Spain)	Defender	1997–2009	117	1	
Nicolás Olivera	(Uruguay)	Forward	1998	2	0	
Cristiano Lucarelli	(Italy)	Forward	1998–1999	13	1	
Gabi Popescu	(Romania)	Midfielder	1998–1999	25	1	
Stefan Schwarz	(Sweden)	Midfielder	1998–1999	23	4	
Óscar Téllez	(Spain)	Defender	1998–1999	1	0	
Alain Roche	(France)	Defender	1998–2000	34	1	
Joachim Björklund	(Sweden)	Defender	1998–2001	57	1	
Adrian Ilie	(Romania)	Midfielder	1998–2002	84	29	
Dennis Șerban	(Romania)	Midfielder	1998–2002	14	1	
Santiago Cañizares*	(Spain)	Goalkeeper	1998–2008	305	0	^{[Zamora]}^{[F]}
Kily González	(Argentina)	Midfielder	1999–2003	92	8	
Mauricio Pellegrino	(Argentina)	Defender	1999–2005	140	5	
Didier Deschamps	(France)	Midfielder	2000–2001	13	0	
Zlatko Zahovič	(Slovenia)	Midfielder	2000–2001	20	3	
Diego Alonso	(Uruguay)	Forward	2000–2002	20	2	
John Carew	(Norway)	Forward	2000–2004	84	20	
Roberto Ayala	(Argentina)	Defender	2000–2007	188	9	
Rubén Baraja	(Spain)	Midfielder	2000–2010	262	41	
Vicente	(Spain)	Midfielder	2000–2011	243	36	
Salva	(Spain)	Forward	2001–2005	24	5	
Pablo Aimar	(Argentina)	Midfielder	2001–2006	162	27	
Gonzalo de los Santos	(Uruguay)	Midfielder	2001–2006	31	2	
Mista	(Spain)	Forward	2001–2006	144	40	
Francisco Rufete	(Spain)	Midfielder	2001–2006	132	13	
Carlos Marchena	(Spain)	Defender	2001–2010	230	8	
Anthony Réveillère	(France)	Defender	2003	18	1	
Ricardo Oliveira	(Brazil)	Forward	2003–2004	21	8	
Fabián Canobbio	(Uruguay)	Midfielder	2003–2005	11	1	
Mohamed Sissoko	(Mali)	Midfielder	2003–2005	45	0	
Raúl Albiol	(Spain)	Defender	2003–2009	131	5	
David Silva	(Spain)	Midfielder	2003–2010	119	21	
Bernardo Corradi	(Italy)	Forward	2004–2006	21	3	
Marco Di Vaio	(Italy)	Forward	2004–2006	35	11	
Stefano Fiore	(Italy)	Midfielder	2004–2007	20	2	
Pablo Hernández	(Spain)	Midfielder	2004–2007; 2008–2012	112	16	
Marco Caneira	(Portugal)	Defender	2004–2008	46	1	
Emiliano Moretti	(Italy)	Defender	2004–2009	135	4	
Miku	(Venezuela)	Forward	2004–2010	2	0	
Patrick Kluivert	(Netherlands)	Forward	2005–2006	10	1	
Fabián Estoyanoff	(Uruguay)	Midfielder	2005–2008	0	0	
Mario Regueiro	(Uruguay)	Midfielder	2005–2008	30	3	
Edu	(Brazil)	Midfielder	2005–2009	50	1	
David Villa	(Spain)	Forward	2005–2010	166	108	
Hugo Viana	(Portugal)	Midfielder	2005–2010	44	2	
Miguel	(Portugal)	Defender	2005–2012	175	2	
Fernando Morientes	(Spain)	Forward	2006–2009	66	19	
Asier del Horno	(Spain)	Defender	2006–2011	15	0	
Joaquín	(Spain)	Midfielder	2006–2011	158	18	
Javier Arizmendi	(Spain)	Forward	2007–2008	30	1	
Iván Helguera	(Spain)	Defender	2007–2008	25	1	
Timo Hildebrand	(Germany)	Goalkeeper	2007–2008	26	0	
Nikola Žigić	(Serbia)	Forward	2007–2010	28	5	
Manuel Fernandes	(Portugal)	Midfielder	2007–2011	56	2	
Juan Mata	(Spain)	Midfielder	2007–2011	129	33	
Sunny	(Nigeria)	Midfielder	2007–2011	10	0	
Jordi Alba	(Spain)	Defender	2007–2012	74	5	
Nacho González	(Uruguay)	Midfielder	2008–2011	0	0	
Hedwiges Maduro	(Netherlands)	Midfielder	2008–2012	76	2	
Éver Banega	(Argentina)	Midfielder	2008–2014	136	9	
César Sánchez	(Spain)	Goalkeeper	2009–2011	63	0	
Isco	(Spain)	Midfielder	2009–2011	4	0	
Jérémy Mathieu	(France)	Defender	2009–2014	126	6	
Paco Alcácer	(Spain)	Forward	2009–2016	93	30	
Marius Stankevičius	(Lithuania)	Defender	2010–2011	20	2	
Aritz Aduriz	(Spain)	Forward	2010–2012	58	17	
Alejandro Domínguez	(Argentina)	Midfielder	2010–2012	22	0	
Mehmet Topal	(Turkey)	Midfielder	2010–2012	43	1	
Tino Costa	(Argentina)	Midfielder	2010–2013	84	10	
Roberto Soldado	(Spain)	Forward	2010–2013	101	59	
Ricardo Costa	(Portugal)	Defender	2010–2014	87	7	
Sofiane Feghouli	(Algeria)	Midfielder	2010–2016	146	20	
Juan Bernat	(Spain)	Defender	2011–2014	51	1	
Jonas	(Brazil)	Forward	2011–2014	113	36	
Adil Rami	(France)	Defender	2011–2014	61	2	
Antonio Barragán	(Spain)	Defender	2011–2016	110	1	
Diego Alves	(Brazil)	Goalkeeper	2011–2017	146	0	
Pablo Piatti	(Argentina)	Midfielder	2011–2017	110	15	
Dani Parejo	(Spain)	Midfielder	2011–2020	282	54	
Fernando Gago	(Argentina)	Midfielder	2012–2013	18	0	
Nelson Valdez	(Paraguay)	Forward	2012–2013	28	6	
Aly Cissokho	(France)	Defender	2012–2014	25	2	
Jonathan Viera	(Spain)	Midfielder	2012–2014	18	2	
Andrés Guardado	(Mexico)	Midfielder	2012–2015	48	1	
João Pereira	(Portugal)	Defender	2012–2015	55	0	
José Gayà	(Spain)	Defender	2012–¤	104	2	
Dorlan Pabón	(Colombia)	Forward	2013–2014	13	3	
Hélder Postiga	(Portugal)	Forward	2013–2014	15	3	
Seydou Keita	(Mali)	Midfielder	2014	11	1	
Philippe Senderos	(Switzerland)	Defender	2014	8	0	
Eduardo Vargas	(Chile)	Forward	2014	17	3	
Nicolás Otamendi	(Argentina)	Defender	2014–2015	35	6	
André Gomes	(Portugal)	Midfielder	2014–2016	63	7	
Shkodran Mustafi	(Germany)	Defender	2014–2016	61	6	
Lucas Orbán	(Argentina)	Defender	2014–2016	29	1	
Álvaro Negredo	(Spain)	Forward	2014–2017	55	10	
João Cancelo	(Portugal)	Defender	2014–2018	74	2	
Rodrigo*	(Spain)	Midfielder	2014–2020	172	38	
Enzo Pérez	(Argentina)	Midfielder	2015–2017	61	0	
Mathew Ryan	(Australia)	Goalkeeper	2015–2017	10	0	
Aymen Abdennour	(Tunisia)	Defender	2015–2019	35	0	
Zakaria Bakkali	(Belgium)	Midfielder	2015–2018	34	2	
Denis Cheryshev	(Russia)	Midfielder	2016; 2019–2022	96	6	
Eliaquim Mangala	(France)	Defender	2016–2017; 2019–2021	45	2	
Munir	(Spain)	Forward	2016–2017	33	6	
Mario Suárez	(Spain)	Midfielder	2016–2017	21	3	
Ezequiel Garay	(Argentina)	Defender	2016–2020	92	6	
Nani	(Portugal)	Midfielder	2016–2018	25	5	
Gonçalo Guedes	(Portugal)	Midfielder	2017–2022	113	23	^{[G]}
Geoffrey Kondogbia	(France)	Midfielder	2017–2020	82	6	
Nemanja Maksimović	(Serbia)	Midfielder	2017–2018	15	0	
Jeison Murillo	(Colombia)	Defender	2017–2020	18	0	
Fabián Orellana	(Chile)	Midfielder	2017–2018	16	1	
Simone Zaza	(Italy)	Forward	2017–2019	53	18	
Lee Kang-in	(South Korea)	Midfielder	2018–2021	44	2	
Uroš Račić	(Serbia)	Midfielder	2018–	7	0	

== Notes ==
For a full description of positions see football positions.

- Pichichi.^{a} ^{b} ^{c} ^{d} Won the Pichichi Trophy while at Valencia.
- Zamora.^{a} ^{b} ^{c} ^{d} ^{e} ^{f} Won the Ricardo Zamora Trophy while at Valencia.
- A. ^{a} ^{b} Mundo and Mario Kempes are the only Valencia players to win multiple Pichichi Trophies, doing so twice each.
- B. Waldo holds the record for most Valencia goals, with 160.
- C. Ricardo Arias holds the record for most Valencia appearances, with 501.
- D. Gaizka Mendieta is the most expensive player ever sold by Valencia, costing €48 million when he moved to Lazio in 2001.
- E. Amedeo Carboni holds the record for most Valencia appearances by a foreign player, with 375.
- F. Santiago Cañizares has the most Ricardo Zamora Trophies of any Valencia player, with 3.
- G. Gonçalo Guedes is the most expensive player ever bought by Valencia, costing €40 million when he moved from Paris Saint-Germain in 2018.
