= 1979 Copa del Rey final =

- Event: 1978–79 Copa del Rey
Valencia	Real Madrid
2	0
- Date: 30 June 1979
- Venue: Vicente Calderón, Madrid
- Referee: Emilio Guruceta
- Attendance: 70,000

The 1979 Copa del Rey final was the 77th final of the Spanish cup competition, the Copa del Rey. The final was played at Vicente Calderón in Madrid on 30 June 1979. The match was won by Valencia CF, who beat Real Madrid 2–0. Valencia won the cup for the fifth time.

== Road to the final ==
Valencia			Round	Madrid
Opponent	Result	Legs		Opponent	Result	Legs
Girona CF	3–1	0–2 away; 1–1 home	Round of 64	Atlético de Madrid	3–3	1–1 away; 2–2 home
Real Sociedad	4–2	1–0 away; 4–1 home	Round of 32	UD Las Palmas	7–5	4–2 home; 1–1 away
FC Barcelona	5–4	4–1 away; 4–0 home	Round of 16	Celta de Vigo	5–1	1–1 away; 4–0 home
CD Alavés	4–0	0–1 away; 3–0 home	Quarterfinals	Real Zaragoza	2–1	2–0 home; 0–1 away
Real Valladolid	3–2	2–0 home; 2–1 away	Semifinals	Sevilla FC	2–1	0–0 away; 2–1 home

== Match details ==
30 June 1979
21:00 CEST

Valencia CF	2–0	Real Madrid
Kempes 24', 90'	Report

Vicente Calderón, Madrid
Attendance: 70,000
Referee: Emilio Guruceta

Valencia	Real Madrid

GK	1	(Spain) José Luis Manzanedo
DF	2	(Spain) José Carrete (c)
DF	5	(Spain) Manuel Botubot
DF	4	(Spain) Ricardo Arias
DF	3	(Spain) José Cerveró	(yellow card) 73'
MF	6	(West Germany) Rainer Bonhof
MF	8	(Spain) Ángel Castellanos
MF	10	(Spain) Daniel Solsona		(substituted off) 86'
MF	7	(Spain) Enrique Saura	(yellow card) 65'
FW	9	(Argentina) Mario Kempes
FW	11	(Argentina) Darío Felman
Substitutes:
DF	12	(Spain) Miguel Tendillo		(substituted on) 86'
GK	13	(Spain) Carlos Pereira
FW	14	(Paraguay) Carlos Diarte
FW	15	(Spain) Pere Vilarrodà
Manager:
(Spain) Pasieguito

GK	1	(Spain) Mariano García Remón		(substituted off) 88'
DF	2	(Spain) Isidoro San José	(yellow card) 83'
DF	5	(Spain) Gregorio Benito (c)
DF	4	(Argentina) Enrique Wolff
DF	3	(Spain) Isidro
MF	6	(Spain) Vicente del Bosque
MF	8	(West Germany) Uli Stielike
MF	10	(Spain) Francisco García Hernández
FW	7	(Spain) Roberto Martínez
FW	9	(Spain) Santillana		(substituted off) 12'
FW	11	(Spain) Francisco Aguilar
Substitutes:
DF	12	(Spain) José Antonio Camacho
GK	13	(Spain) Javier Maté		(substituted on) 88'
MF	14	(Spain) Alberto Vitoria		(substituted on) 12'
MF	15	(Spain) Carlos Escribano
Manager:
(Spain) Luis Molowny

MATCH RULES

- 90 minutes.
- 30 minutes of extra-time if necessary.
- Penalty shoot-out if scores still level.
- Four named substitutes.
- Maximum of two substitutions.

Copa del Rey
1978–79 Winners
Valencia CF
5th title
