= 1980 European Cup Winners' Cup final =

- Match programme cover
- Event: 1979–80 European Cup Winners' Cup
Arsenal	Valencia
(England)	(Spain)
0	0
- After extra time Valencia won 5–4 on penalties
- Date: 14 May 1980
- Venue: Heysel Stadium, Brussels
- Referee: Vojtech Christov (Czechoslovakia)
- Attendance: 40,000

The 1980 European Cup Winners' Cup final was a football match contested on 14 May 1980 between Arsenal of England and Valencia of Spain. The final was held at Heysel Stadium in Brussels, Belgium. Valencia won the match 5–4 on penalties. It was the 20th European Cup Winners' Cup final and the only time that the title was decided by a penalty shoot-out. It was Valencia's third European title after their two Inter-Cities Fairs Cup victories in the 1960s.

== Route to the final ==
(England) Arsenal					(Spain) Valencia			
Opponent	Agg.	1st leg	2nd leg		Opponent	Agg.	1st leg	2nd leg
(Turkey) Fenerbahçe	2–0	2–0 (H)	0–0 (H)	First round	(Denmark) Boldklubben 1903	6–2	2–2 (A)	4–0 (H)
(East Germany) 1. FC Magdeburg	4–3	2–1 (H)	2–2 (A)	Second round	(Scotland) Rangers	4–2	1–1 (H)	3–1 (A)
(Sweden) IFK Göteborg	5–1	5–1 (H)	0–0 (A)	Quarter-finals	(Spain) Barcelona	5–3	1–0 (A)	4–3 (H)
(Italy) Juventus	2–1	1–1 (H)	1–0 (A)	Semi-finals	(France) Nantes	5–2	1–2 (A)	4–0 (H)

== Match ==
=== Details ===
14 May 1980
20:15 CEST

Arsenal (England)	0–0 (a.e.t.)	(Spain) Valencia
	Report
Penalties
Brady (penalty missed); Stapleton (penalty scored); Sunderland (penalty scored); Talbot (penalty scored); Hollins (penalty scored); Rix (penalty missed)	4–5	(penalty missed) Kempes; (penalty scored) Solsona; (penalty scored) Rodríguez; (penalty scored) Castellanos; (penalty scored) Bonhof; (penalty scored) Arias

Heysel Stadium, Brussels
Attendance: 40,000
Referee: Vojtech Christov (Czechoslovakia)

Arsenal	Valencia

GK	1	(Northern Ireland) Pat Jennings
RB	2	(Northern Ireland) Pat Rice (c)
LB	3	(Northern Ireland) Sammy Nelson
MF	4	(England) Brian Talbot
DF	5	(Republic of Ireland) David O'Leary
DF	6	(Scotland) Willie Young
MF	7	(Republic of Ireland) Liam Brady
FW	8	(England) Alan Sunderland
FW	9	(Republic of Ireland) Frank Stapleton
RM	10	(England) David Price	(substituted off) 105'
LM	11	(England) Graham Rix
Substitutes:
MF	12	(England) John Hollins	(substituted on) 105'
Manager:
(Northern Ireland) Terry Neill

GK	1	(Spain) Carlos Pereira
RB	2	(Spain) José Carrete
LB	3	(Spain) Manuel Botubot
DF	4	(Spain) Ricardo Arias
DF	5	(Spain) Miguel Tendillo
MF	6	(Spain) Daniel Solsona
MF	7	(Spain) Enrique Saura (c)
RM	8	(West Germany) Rainer Bonhof
FW	9	(Argentina) Mario Kempes
MF	10	(Spain) Javier Subirats	(substituted off) 112'
LM	11	(Spain) Pablo Rodríguez
Substitutes:
MF	15	(Spain) Ángel Castellanos	(substituted on) 112'
Manager:
(Argentina) (Spain) Alfredo Di Stéfano

== See also ==
- 1980 European Cup Final
- 1980 UEFA Cup Final
- 1980 European Super Cup
- Arsenal F.C. in European football
- Valencia CF in European football
