= Carlos Pereira (footballer, born 1951) =

Spanish footballer (born 1951)

Personal information
- Full name: Carlos Santiago Pereira
- Date of birth: 7 September 1951 (age 75)
- Place of birth: Marín, Spain
- Height: 1.85 m (6 ft 1 in)
- Position: Goalkeeper

Senior career*
Years	Team	Apps	(Gls)
1970–1971	Pontevedra B		
1971–1974	Pontevedra	27+	(0)
1974–1982	Valencia	58	(0)
1975–1976	→ Alavés (loan)	12	(0)
1981–1982	→ Racing Santander (loan)	18	(0)
1982–1986	Atlético Madrid	34	(0)
1985–1986	→ Celta Vigo (loan)	15	(0)
1987–1988	Arenteiro	19	(0)
1988–1989	Gran Peña		
Total		183+	(0)
- * Club domestic league appearances and goals

Carlos Santiago Pereira (born 7 September 1951) is a Spanish former professional footballer who played as a goalkeeper.

He made 125 La Liga appearances over the course of a decade for Valencia, Racing de Santander, Atlético Madrid and Celta Vigo. With the first of those clubs, he won the Copa del Rey, UEFA Cup Winners' Cup and UEFA Super Cup in successive seasons.

== Career ==
=== Early career ===
Born in Marín in Galicia, Pereira began his career with Rápido de Pereiró in Castrelos (Pontevedra) before joining the youth ranks of Pontevedra in the Segunda División. His first season as a senior was with the B-team in the regional leagues in 1970–71.

=== Valencia ===
In May 1974, Pereira transferred to Valencia for a fee of 5.75 million Spanish pesetas and the buying club's promise to take part in Pontevedra's pre-season tournament. He made his La Liga debut on 6 October in the fourth game of the season, a 5–2 loss away to Barcelona at the Camp Nou, conceding the first goal from Johan Cruyff after three minutes; he did not play again for the rest of the campaign.

After spending 1975–76 on loan to Alavés in the second tier, Pereira returned to the Valencian first team. He battled for a starting place against José Manzanedo and Pepe Balaguer. He was part of the side that won the Copa del Rey in 1978–79, but his last involvement was in the first leg of the last 16, a 4–1 loss away to Barcelona. In the following season's UEFA Cup Winners' Cup, he played the final on 14 May 1980 against Arsenal, keeping the game goalless after 120 minutes. In the penalty shootout, he overcame the miss by Valencia's star player Mario Kempes by saving the attempts from Liam Brady and Graham Rix to win the trophy at Heysel Stadium.

In the 1980 European Super Cup, Pereira played the first game on 25 November, a 2–1 loss away to Nottingham Forest. In the second leg, he was replaced by José Manuel Sempere in a 1–0 win to lift the trophy on the away goals rule.

In December 1981, Pereira was loaned to fellow top-flight team Racing de Santander for the rest of the season. He took a cut in basic rate of pay from 100,000 pesetas a month at Valencia to 70,000 at the Cantabrians, who could afford the detail due to becoming the first Spanish club with shirt sponsorship, by home appliances Teka.

=== Later career ===
Pereira transferred to Atlético Madrid in August 1982, for a fee of 15 million pesetas and a salary of 6 million annually for two years. The club had lost goalkeeper José Navarro to injury, while back-ups Ángel Mejías and Abel Resino were inexperienced. He won another Copa del Rey in 1985, playing both legs of a 6–3 aggregate win over Deportivo de La Coruña in the last 16.

In September 1985, with his opportunities at the Vicente Calderón Stadium limited by Argentine Ubaldo Fillol, Pereira moved to Celta Vigo of his home province. He arrived at a club where regular goalkeeper Javier Maté was injured and reserve José Antonio Fernández Pla, known as Chuco, was playing.

== Personal life ==
Pereira was identifiable for wearing a red goalkeeper's jersey, and for his thick beard.

Pereira's older brother José (1937–1985) was also a goalkeeper, known by the nickname Sansón. His nephew Agustín Rodríguez Santiago played in the same position for Real Madrid in the 1980s.
