= Manuel Botubot =

Spanish association football player

Personal information
- Full name: Manuel Ángel Botubot Pereira
- Date of birth: 23 November 1955 (age 70)
- Place of birth: Cádiz, Spain
- Height: 1.84 m (6 ft 0 in)
- Position: Defender

Youth career
- Cádiz

Senior career*
Years	Team	Apps	(Gls)
1974–1976	Cádiz B		
1976–1977	Cádiz	17	(0)
1977–1984	Valencia	210	(8)
1984–1986	Castellón	50	(1)
1986–1987	Xerez	29	(3)
Total		306+	(12+)

International career
1976	Spain U21	1	(0)
1978	Spain	1	(0)
- * Club domestic league appearances and goals

Manuel Ángel Botubot Pereira (born 23 November 1955) is a Spanish former footballer who played as a defender.

He played eight La Liga seasons for Valencia, totalling 274 games and 10 goals across all competitions, and winning the Copa del Rey, UEFA Cup Winners' Cup and UEFA Super Cup in consecutive seasons. He started and ended his career in the Segunda División, where he played 96 games and scored 4 goals for Cádiz, Castellón and Xerez. He played one game for Spain in 1978.

== Club career ==
Born in Cádiz in Andalusia, Botubot began his career at hometown club Cádiz CF. After playing two seasons for the reserve team in the regional leagues, he was promoted to the first team by manager Enrique Mateos, making his debut on 5 September 1976 on the first day of the Segunda División season, a 2–1 home win over neighbours Córdoba.

In January 1977, Botubot left the Cádiz team that would win promotion to La Liga that season, joining Valencia of that league. He made his debut on 30 January in a 3–0 loss at Español, as a half-time substitute for Jesús Martínez Rivadeneira. The report in Barcelona-based Mundo Deportivo noted that he started with energy but contributed little to his team.

On 28 October 1978, Botubot scored his first career goal, in a 4–0 home win over Sporting de Gijón; having recovered the ball near his own penalty area, he went on a 50-metre dribble before shooting. In the last game of the season on 2 June, he was sent off after 52 minutes for a foul on Alfredo Amarillo in a 3–1 loss at Salamanca. Twenty-eight days later he played the 1979 Copa del Rey final, a 2–0 win over Real Madrid in the Spanish capital.

In 1979–80, Botubot played nine games as Valencia won the UEFA Cup Winners' Cup, including the full 120 minutes as they defeated Arsenal on penalties in the final in Brussels. On 5 November that year, he scored the only goal of a home win over Carl Zeiss Gena of East Germany in the last-16 second leg of their title defence, though his team were still eliminated. The calendar year ended with victory over Nottingham Forest in the UEFA Super Cup, with Botubot playing both games.

Botubot joined second-tier Castellón in July 1984, on a one-year deal with the option of a second on condition of playing 25 games. He played two seasons at the club, scoring a late winner on 4 November in a 2–1 home victory over Tenerife. He then returned to his home province, signing for one season at Xerez in the same league.

In January 2021, 65-year-old Botubot wrote an open letter to Anil Murthy, the president of Valencia CF under the ownership of Singaporean Peter Lim. Botubot wrote that the club should be run by its supporters.

== International career ==
Botubot played one game for the Spain under-21 team on 9 October 1976, as they lost 4–1 away to Yugoslavia in Zagreb in the 1978 UEFA European Under-21 Championship qualifying.

On 21 December 1978, Botubot earned his only cap for the senior team, in a 1–0 friendly loss to Italy at the Stadio Olimpico. Pichi Alonso, Canito and Jesús María Zamora were also given their debut by manager László Kubala in that match.
