= Ricardo Arias =

Ricardo Arias may refer to:

- Ricardo Arias (politician) (1912–1993), former Panamanian President
- Ricardo Arias Calderón (1933–1997), Panamanian politician
- Ricardo Alberto Arias (born 1940), Panamanian ambassador
- Ricardo Arias (footballer) (born 1957), Spanish former footballer
