= Pablo Rodríguez (footballer, born 1955) =

Spanish footballer (born 1955)

Personal information
- Full name: Pablo Rodríguez Flores
- Date of birth: 8 March 1955 (age 71)
- Place of birth: Turón, Spain
- Height: 1.65 m (5 ft 5 in)
- Position: Winger

Youth career
- Turón
- Sporting Gijón

Senior career*
Years	Team	Apps	(Gls)
1974–1978	Mestalla		
1978–1984	Valencia	104	(8)
1984–1985	Salamanca	33	(3)
1985–1986	Levante	27	(2)
- * Club domestic league appearances and goals

Pablo Rodríguez Flores (born 8 March 1955) is a Spanish retired professional footballer who played as a left winger.

== Club career ==
Born in Turón (Mieres), Asturias, Rodríguez arrived at Valencia CF from local giants Sporting de Gijón, going on to compete several seasons with the reserves. He made his debut with the first team on 8 April 1978 in a 7–0 home rout of Rayo Vallecano, but would only appear in a combined ten La Liga games in his first two seasons.

In the following four years, Rodríguez was a relatively important attacking unit for the Che, playing an average of 21 league matches. He contributed with six appearances and one goal as the club won the 1980 UEFA Cup Winners' Cup, including the full 120 minutes in the final against Arsenal, where he also converted his penalty shootout attempt.

Rodríguez retired in June 1986 at the age of 31, after one-season spells with UD Salamanca (Segunda División, team relegation) and Levante UD (lower leagues).

== Honours ==
Valencia

- Copa del Rey: 1978–79
- UEFA Cup Winners' Cup: 1979–80
- UEFA Super Cup: 1980
