= José Cerveró =

Spanish footballer (1949–2024)

- Cerveró with Valencia

Personal information
- Full name: José Cerveró San Braulio
- Date of birth: 3 September 1949
- Place of birth: Real de Montroi, Spain
- Date of death: 11 July 2024 (aged 74)
- Position: Left back

Youth career
- 1969–1971: Valencia Mestalla

Senior career*
Years	Team	Apps	(Gls)
1971–1973	Valencia Mestalla	28+	(1+)
1971–1972	→ Melilla (loan)		
1973–1983	Valencia	221	(2)
Total		249+	(3+)
- * Club domestic league appearances and goals

José Cerveró San Braulio (3 September 1949 – 17 July 2024) was a Spanish footballer who played as a left back. He played 277 official matches for Valencia CF between 1974 and 1983, winning the Copa del Rey (1978–79), the UEFA Cup Winners' Cup (1979–80) and the UEFA Super Cup (1980).

== Career ==
Born in Real in the Province of Valencia, Cerveró spent his entire playing career with Valencia CF, apart from the 1971–72 season with Melilla CF in the Tercera División on loan due to his national service. He made his first-team debut for his main club in La Liga on 6 January 1974 under manager Alfredo Di Stéfano, in a 1–0 loss at CD Málaga. On 27 February, in his seventh game, he scored one of only two goals for the club to conclude a 2–0 home win over Valencian Community neighbours Elche CF, shooting from near the corner kick quadrant.

Cerveró played nine games of Valencia's Copa del Rey conquest in 1978–79, including the final on 30 June that they won 2–0 against Real Madrid in the national capital. This qualified the team to the UEFA Cup Winners' Cup of 1979–80 which they won, later taking the UEFA Super Cup against Nottingham Forest with Cerveró playing both matches of a win on the away goals rule.

After his playing career, Cerveró managed small clubs in his local area from 1994 to 2018, among them UD Alzira.
