= List of UEFA Super Cup winning managers =

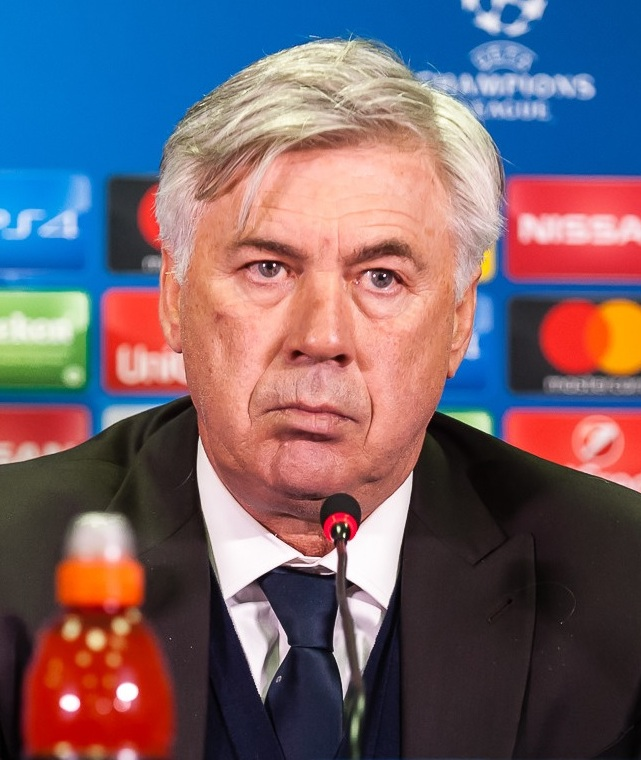
Carlo Ancelotti has won the trophy a record five times.

The UEFA Super Cup (called European Super Cup prior to 1995) is an annual contest played between the previous season's UEFA Champions League (formerly the European Cup) and UEFA Europa League (formerly UEFA Cup) winners. The first final, played over two legs between Dutch team Ajax and Glasgow's Rangers is considered unofficial by UEFA. Rangers were banned from European competition due to the behaviour of their fans but, having won the UEFA Cup Winners' Cup the previous season, contested the title. Ajax lifted the trophy under the guidance of Romanian manager Ștefan Kovács, winning 6–3 over the two legs.

From 1973 to 1999, the Super Cup was contested by the winners of the European Cup/Champions League and the holders of the UEFA Cup Winners' Cup. The latter competition was then abolished and since then, the UEFA Cup have taken part in their place, Galatasaray being the first UEFA Cup winners to do so in 2000. Since the 1998 competition, the final has been a single match, played at a neutral venue (formerly the Stade Louis II in Monaco but now alternating every year). The first final held in the principality ended in success for Chelsea, led by Italian Gianluca Vialli.

Italian managers have fared most successfully since the inception of the contest, winning twelve titles. Carlo Ancelotti (with Milan in 2003 and 2007 and Real Madrid in 2014, 2022 and 2024) has won the trophy on five occasions. Pep Guardiola (with Barcelona in 2009 and 2012, Bayern Munich in 2013 and Manchester City in 2023) is the only manager to have won the trophy with three different clubs.

== List ==
=== By year ===
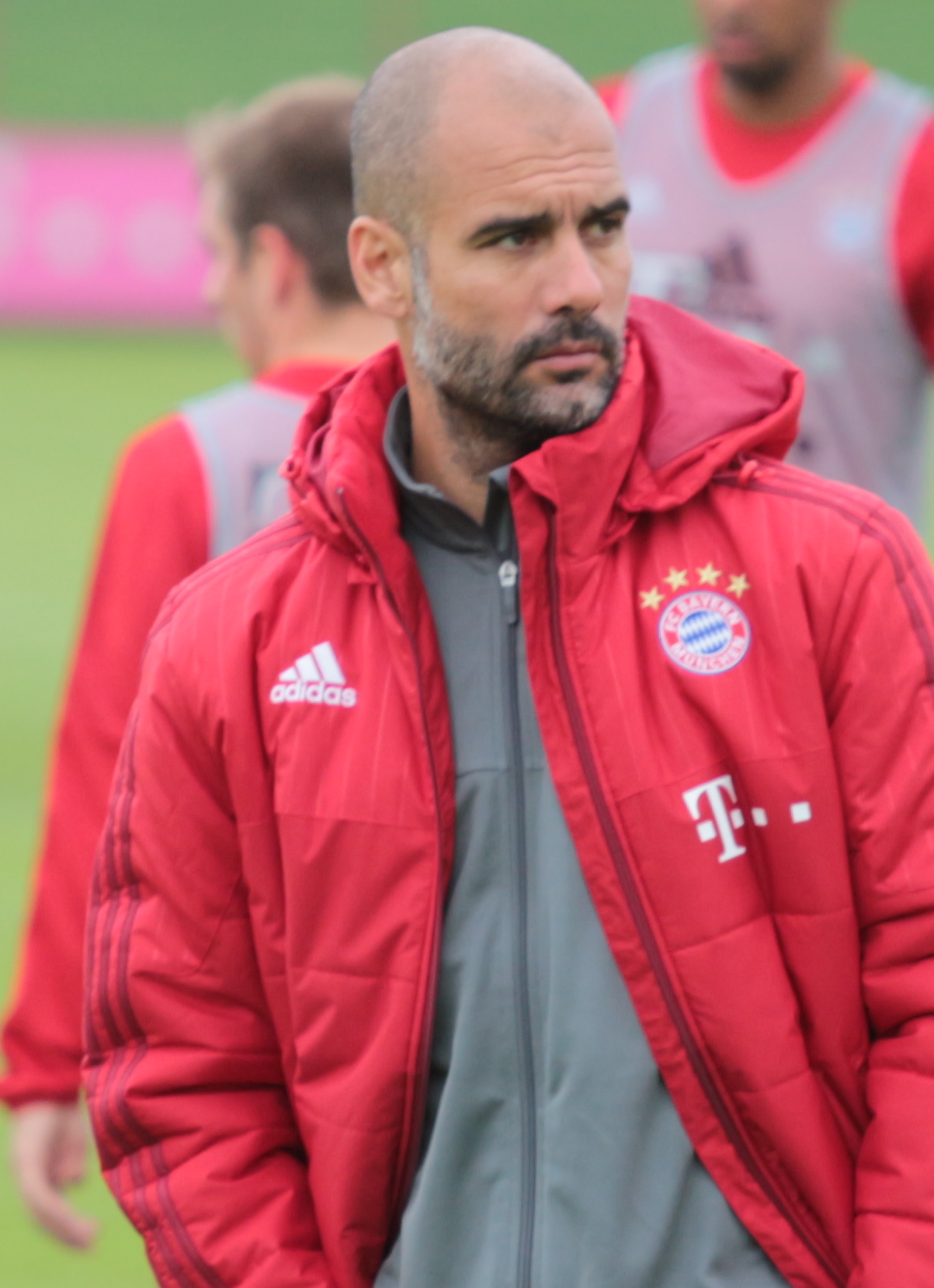
Pep Guardiola won the Super Cup with Barcelona in 2009 and 2011, Bayern Munich in 2013, and Manchester City in 2023.

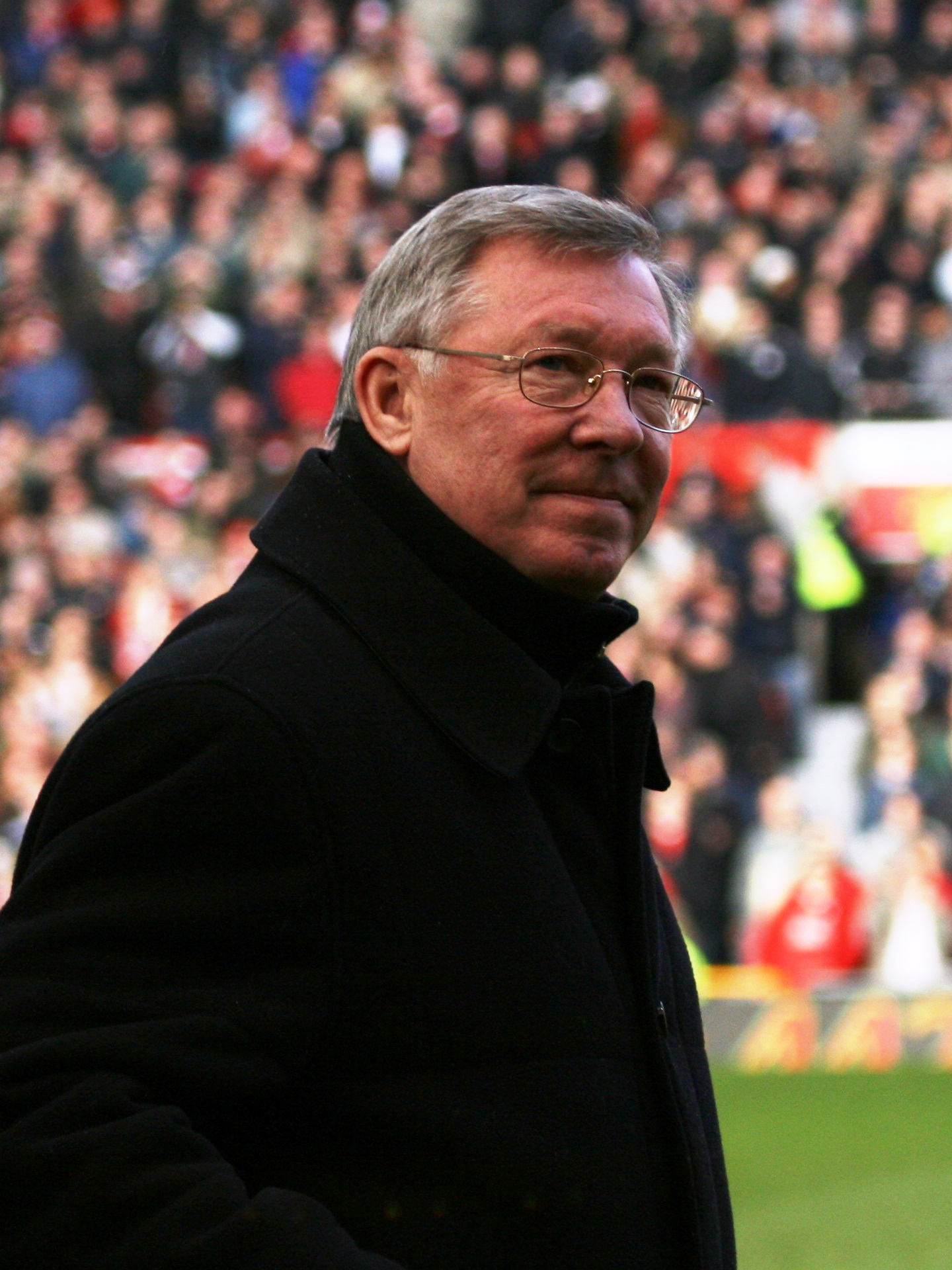
Alex Ferguson won the Super Cup with Aberdeen in 1983 and Manchester United in 1991.

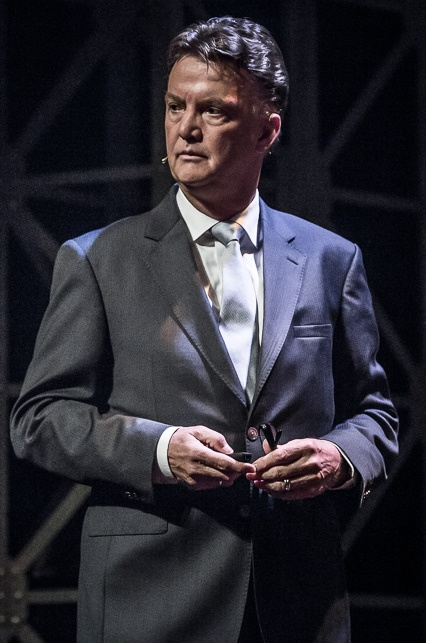
Louis van Gaal won the trophy with Ajax in 1995 and Barcelona in 1997.

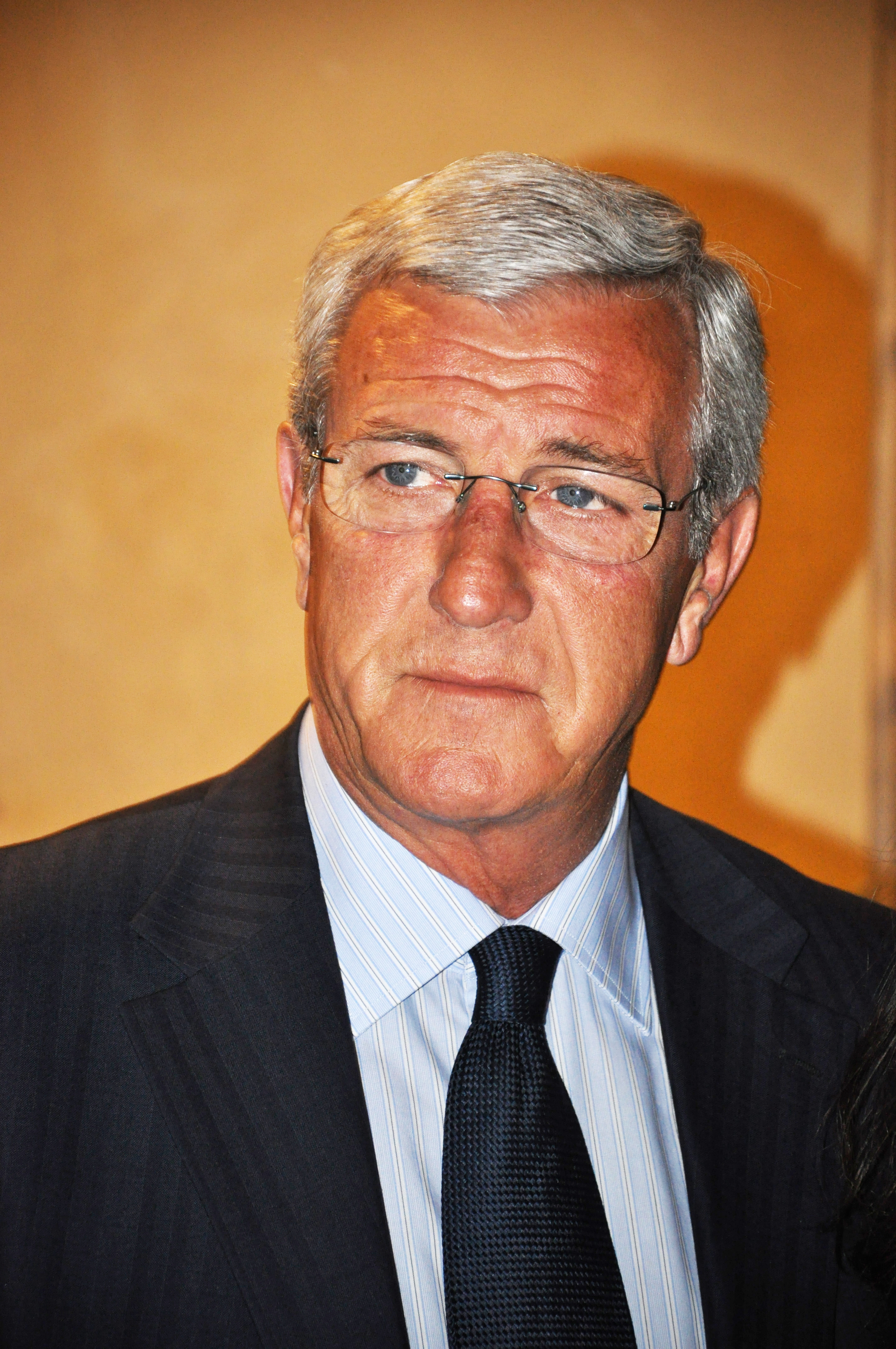
Marcello Lippi won the accolade with Juventus in 1996.

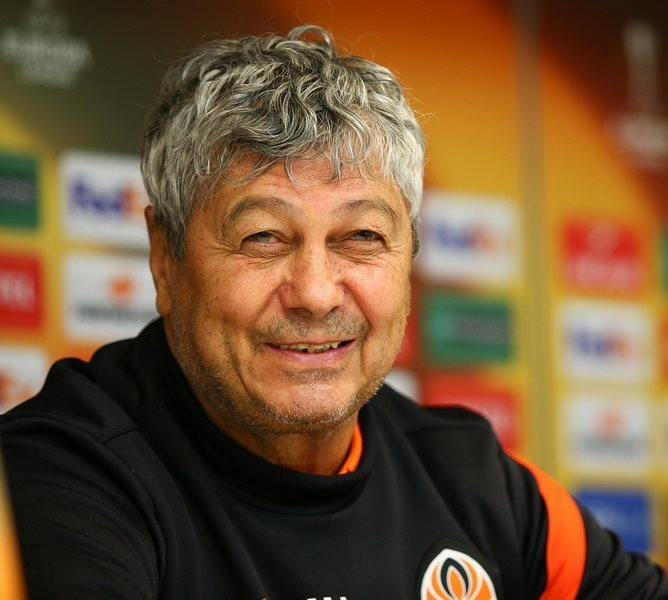
Mircea Lucescu won the cup with Galatasaray in 2000.

UEFA Super Cup winning managers
Final	Nationality	Winning manager	Nation	Club	Ref(s)
1973	Netherlands	George Knobel	Netherlands	Ajax	
1974	(West Germany) Bayern Munich and (East Germany) 1. FC Magdeburg did not play.				
1975	Soviet Union	Valeri Lobanovsky	Soviet Union	Dynamo Kyiv	
1976	Belgium	Raymond Goethals	Belgium	Anderlecht	
1977	England	Bob Paisley	England	Liverpool	
1978	Belgium	Raymond Goethals	Belgium	Anderlecht	
1979	England	Brian Clough	England	Nottingham Forest	
1980	Spain	Bernardino Pérez	Spain	Valencia	
1981	(England) Liverpool and (Soviet Union) Dinamo Tbilisi did not play.				
1982	England	Tony Barton	England	Aston Villa	
1983	Scotland	Alex Ferguson	Scotland	Aberdeen	
1984	Italy	Giovanni Trapattoni	Italy	Juventus	
1985	(Italy) Juventus and (England) Everton did not play.				
1986	Romania	Anghel Iordănescu	Romania	Steaua București	
1987	Yugoslavia	Tomislav Ivić	Portugal	Porto	
1988	Netherlands	Aad de Mos	Belgium	Mechelen	
1989	Italy	Arrigo Sacchi	Italy	Milan	
1990	Italy	Arrigo Sacchi	Italy	Milan	
1991	Scotland	Alex Ferguson	England	Manchester United	
1992	Netherlands	Johan Cruyff	Spain	Barcelona	
1993	Italy	Nevio Scala	Italy	Parma	
1994	Italy	Fabio Capello	Italy	Milan	
1995	Netherlands	Louis van Gaal	Netherlands	Ajax	
1996	Italy	Marcello Lippi	Italy	Juventus	
1997	Netherlands	Louis van Gaal	Spain	Barcelona	
1998	Italy	Gianluca Vialli	England	Chelsea	
1999	Sweden	Sven-Göran Eriksson	Italy	Lazio	
2000	Romania	Mircea Lucescu	Turkey	Galatasaray	
2001	France	Gérard Houllier	England	Liverpool	
2002	Spain	Vicente del Bosque	Spain	Real Madrid	
2003	Italy	Carlo Ancelotti	Italy	Milan	
2004	Italy	Claudio Ranieri	Spain	Valencia	
2005	Spain	Rafael Benítez	England	Liverpool	
2006	Spain	Juande Ramos	Spain	Sevilla	
2007	Italy	Carlo Ancelotti	Italy	Milan	
2008	Netherlands	Dick Advocaat	Russia	Zenit Saint Petersburg	
2009	Spain	Pep Guardiola	Spain	Barcelona	
2010	Spain	Quique Sánchez Flores	Spain	Atlético Madrid	
2011	Spain	Pep Guardiola	Spain	Barcelona	
2012	Argentina	Diego Simeone	Spain	Atlético Madrid	
2013	Spain	Pep Guardiola	Germany	Bayern Munich	
2014	Italy	Carlo Ancelotti	Spain	Real Madrid	
2015	Spain	Luis Enrique	Spain	Barcelona	
2016	France	Zinedine Zidane	Spain	Real Madrid	
2017	France	Zinedine Zidane	Spain	Real Madrid	
2018	Argentina	Diego Simeone (Note: Simeone was given a four-match touchline ban in UEFA competitions following the 2017–18 UEFA Europa League semi-final first leg, so assistant manager and compatriot Germán Burgos filled in as manager on the touchline.)	Spain	Atlético Madrid	
2019	Germany	Jürgen Klopp	England	Liverpool	
2020	Germany	Hansi Flick	Germany	Bayern Munich	
2021	Germany	Thomas Tuchel	England	Chelsea	
2022	Italy	Carlo Ancelotti	Spain	Real Madrid	
2023	Spain	Pep Guardiola	England	Manchester City	
2024	Italy	Carlo Ancelotti	Spain	Real Madrid	
2025	Spain	Luis Enrique	France	Paris Saint-Germain	
2026	Spain	Luis Enrique	France	Paris Saint-Germain	

=== Managers with multiple titles ===
Managers who have won multiple UEFA Super Cups
Rank	Nationality	Manager	Number of wins	Years won	Club(s)
1	Italy	Carlo Ancelotti	5	2003, 2007, 2014, 2022, 2024	Milan (2), Real Madrid (3)
2	Spain	Pep Guardiola	4	2009, 2011, 2013, 2023	Barcelona (2), Bayern Munich, Manchester City
3	Spain	Luis Enrique	3	2015, 2025, 2026	Barcelona, Paris Saint-Germain (2)
4	Belgium	Raymond Goethals	2	1976, 1978	Anderlecht
4	Italy	Arrigo Sacchi	2	1989, 1990	Milan
4	Netherlands	Louis van Gaal	2	1995, 1997	Ajax, Barcelona
4	Scotland	Alex Ferguson	2	1983, 1991	Aberdeen, Manchester United
4	France	Zinedine Zidane	2	2016, 2017	Real Madrid
4	Argentina	Diego Simeone	2	2012, 2018	Atlético Madrid

=== By nationality ===
This table lists the total number of titles won by managers of each nationality.

UEFA Super Cup winning managers by nationality
Nationality	Number of wins
Italy	13
Spain	12
Netherlands	6
England	3
France	3
Germany	3
Belgium	2
Scotland	2
Romania (Note: Excludes the 1972 European Super Cup, not organised nor recognised by UEFA as an official title.)	2
Argentina	2
Soviet Union	1
Yugoslavia	1
Sweden	1
