= Valencia CF in European football =

Spanish club in European football

- Club: Valencia
- Seasons played: 40
- First entry: 1961–62 Inter-Cities Fairs Cup
- Latest entry: 2019–20 UEFA Champions League

Titles
- Europa League: 1: 2004
- Cup Winners' Cup: 1: 1980
- Intertoto Cup: 1: 1998
- Super Cup: 2: 1980; 2004
- Inter-Cities Fairs Cup: 2: 1962; 1963

These are the matches that Valencia CF have played in European football competitions.

== European Cup / UEFA Champions League ==
Season	Round	Opposing team	Home	Away	Aggregate
1971–72	Preliminary round	Union Luxembourg	3–1	1–0	4–1
1971–72	First round	(Socialist Federal Republic of Yugoslavia) Hajduk Split	0–0	1–1	1–1 (a)
1971–72	Second round	(Hungary) Újpesti Dózsa	0–1	1–2	1–3
1999–2000	Third qualifying round	(Israel) Hapoel Haifa	2–0	2–0	4–0
1999–2000	First group stage Group F	(Scotland) Rangers	2–0	2–1	1st
1999–2000	First group stage Group F	(Netherlands) PSV	1–0	1–1	1st
1999–2000	First group stage Group F	(Germany) Bayern Munich	1–1	1–1	1st
1999–2000	Second group stage Group B	(France) Bordeaux	3–0	4–1	2nd
1999–2000	Second group stage Group B	(England) Manchester United	0–0	0–3	2nd
1999–2000	Second group stage Group B	(Italy) Fiorentina	2–0	0–1	2nd
1999–2000	Quarter-final	(Italy) Lazio	5–2	0–1	5–3
1999–2000	Semi-final	(Spain) Barcelona	4–1	1–2	5–3
1999–2000	Final	(Spain) Real Madrid	0–3 (N)		
2000–01	Third qualifying round	(Austria) Tirol Innsbruck	4–1	0–0	4–1
2000–01	First group stage Group C	(Greece) Olympiacos	2–1	0–1	1st
2000–01	First group stage Group C	(Netherlands) Heerenveen	1–1	1–0	1st
2000–01	First group stage Group C	(France) Lyon	1–0	2–1	1st
2000–01	Second group stage Group A	(Austria) Sturm Graz	2–0	5–0	1st
2000–01	Second group stage Group A	(Greece) Panathinaikos	2–1	0–0	1st
2000–01	Second group stage Group A	(England) Manchester United	0–0	1–1	1st
2000–01	Quarter-final	(England) Arsenal	1–0	1–2	2–2 (a)
2000–01	Semi-final	(England) Leeds United	3–0	0–0	3–0
2000–01	Final	(Germany) Bayern Munich	1–1 (N) 4–5 (p)		
2002–03	First group stage Group B	(England) Liverpool	2–0	1–0	1st
2002–03	First group stage Group B	(Russia) Spartak Moscow	3–0	3–0	1st
2002–03	First group stage Group B	(Switzerland) Basel	6–2	2–2	1st
2002–03	Second group stage Group B	(Netherlands) Ajax	1–1	1–1	1st
2002–03	Second group stage Group B	(England) Arsenal	2–1	0–0	1st
2002–03	Second group stage Group B	(Italy) Roma	0–3	1–0	1st
2002–03	Quarter-final	(Italy) Internazionale	2–1	0–1	2–2 (a)
2004–05	Group G	(Belgium) Anderlecht	2–0	2–1	3rd
2004–05	Group G	(Germany) Werder Bremen	0–2	1–2	3rd
2004–05	Group G	(Italy) Internazionale	1–5	0–0	3rd
2006–07	Third qualifying round	(Austria) Red Bull Salzburg	3–0	0–1	3–1
2006–07	Group D	(Greece) Olympiacos	2–0	4–2	1st
2006–07	Group D	(Italy) Roma	2–1	0–1	1st
2006–07	Group D	(Ukraine) Shakhtar Donetsk	2–0	2–2	1st
2006–07	Round of 16	(Italy) Internazionale	0–0	2–2	2–2 (a)
2006–07	Quarter-final	(England) Chelsea	1–2	1–1	2–3
2007–08	Third qualifying round	(Sweden) Elfsborg	3–0	2–1	5–1
2007–08	Group B	(Germany) Schalke 04	0–0	1–0	4th
2007–08	Group B	(England) Chelsea	1–2	0–0	4th
2007–08	Group B	(Norway) Rosenborg	0–2	0–2	4th
2010–11	Group C	(Turkey) Bursaspor	6–1	4–0	2nd
2010–11	Group C	(England) Manchester United	0–1	1–1	2nd
2010–11	Group C	(Scotland) Rangers	3–0	1–1	2nd
2010–11	Round of 16	(Germany) Schalke 04	1–1	1–3	2–4
2011–12	Group E	(Belgium) Genk	7–0	0–0	3rd
2011–12	Group E	(England) Chelsea	1–1	0–3	3rd
2011–12	Group E	(Germany) Bayer Leverkusen	3–1	1–2	3rd
2012–13	Group F	(Germany) Bayern Munich	1–1	1–2	2nd
2012–13	Group F	(France) Lille	2–0	1–0	2nd
2012–13	Group F	(Belarus) BATE Borisov	4–2	3–0	2nd
2012–13	Round of 16	(France) Paris Saint-Germain	1–2	1–1	2–3
2015–16	Play-off round	(France) Monaco	3–1	1–2	4–3
2015–16	Group H	(Belgium) Gent	2–1	0–1	3rd
2015–16	Group H	(France) Lyon	0–2	1–0	3rd
2015–16	Group H	(Russia) Zenit Saint Petersburg	2–3	0–2	3rd
2018–19	Group H	(Italy) Juventus	0–2	0–1	3rd
2018–19	Group H	(England) Manchester United	2–1	0–0	3rd
2018–19	Group H	(Switzerland) Young Boys	3–1	1–1	3rd
2019–20	Group H	(England) Chelsea	2–2	1–0	1st
2019–20	Group H	(Netherlands) Ajax	0–3	1–0	1st
2019–20	Group H	(France) Lille	4–1	1–1	1st
2019–20	Round of 16	(Italy) Atalanta	3–4	1–4	4–8

== European Cup Winners' Cup ==
Season	Round	Opposing team	Home	Away	Aggregate
1967–68	First round	(Northern Ireland) Crusaders	4–0	4–2	8–2
1967–68	Second round	(Romania) Steaua București	3–0	0–1	3–1
1967–68	Quarter-final	(West Germany) Bayern Munich	1–1	0–1	1–2
1979–80	First round	(Denmark) B1903	4–0	2–2	6–2
1979–80	Second round	(Scotland) Rangers	1–1	3–1	4–2
1979–80	Quarter-final	(Spain) Barcelona	4–3	1–0	5–3
1979–80	Semi-final	(France) Nantes	4–0	1–2	5–2
1979–80	Final	(England) Arsenal	0–0 (N) 5–4 (p)		
1980–81	First round	(France) Monaco	2–0	3–3	5–3
1980–81	Second round	(East Germany) Carl Zeiss Jena	1–0	1–3	2–3

== UEFA Cup / UEFA Europa League ==
Season	Round	Opposing team	Home	Away	Aggregate
1972–73	First round	(England) Manchester City	2–1	2–2	4–3
1972–73	Second round	(Socialist Federal Republic of Yugoslavia) Red Star Belgrade	0–1	1–3	1–4
1978–79	First round	(Bulgaria) CSKA Sofia	4–1	1–2	5–3
1978–79	Second round	(Romania) Argeș Pitești	5–2	1–2	6–4
1978–79	Third round	(England) West Bromwich Albion	1–1	0–2	1–3
1981–82	First round	(Czechoslovakia) Bohemians Prague	1–0	1–0	2–0
1981–82	Second round	(Portugal) Boavista	2–0	0–1	2–1
1981–82	Third round	(Socialist Federal Republic of Yugoslavia) Hajduk Split	5–1	1–4	6–5
1981–82	Quarter-final	(Sweden) IFK Göteborg	2–2	0–2	2–4
1982–83	First round	(England) Manchester United	2–1	0–0	2–1
1982–83	Second round	(Czechoslovakia) Baník Ostrava	1–0	0–0	1–0
1982–83	Third round	(Soviet Union) Spartak Moscow	2–0	0–0	2–0
1982–83	Quarter-final	(Belgium) Anderlecht	1–2	1–3	2–5
1989–90	First round	(Romania) Victoria București	3–1	1–1	4–2
1989–90	Second round	(Portugal) Porto	3–2	1–3	4–5
1990–91	First round	(Greece) Iraklis	2–0	0–0	2–0
1990–91	Second round	(Italy) Roma	1–1	1–2	2–3
1992–93	First round	(Italy) Napoli	1–5	0–1	1–6
1993–94	First round	(France) Nantes	3–1	1–1	4–2
1993–94	Second round	(Germany) Karlsruher SC	3–1	0–7	3–8
1996–97	First round	(Germany) Bayern Munich	3–0	0–1	3–1
1996–97	Second round	(Czech Republic) Slavia Prague	0–0	1–0	1–0
1996–97	Third round	(Turkey) Beşiktaş	3–1	2–2	5–3
1996–97	Quarter-final	(Germany) Schalke 04	1–1	0–2	1–3
1998–99	First round	(Romania) Steaua București	4–3	3–0	7–3
1998–99	Second round	(England) Liverpool	2–2	0–0	2–2 (a)
2001–02	First round	(Russia) FC Chernomorets	5–0	1–0	6–0
2001–02	Second round	(Poland) Legia Warsaw	6–1	1–1	7–2
2001–02	Third round	(Scotland) Celtic	1–0	0–1	1–1, 5–4 (p)
2001–02	Fourth round	(Switzerland) Servette	3–0	2–2	5–2
2001–02	Quarter-final	(Italy) Internazionale	0–1	1–1	1–2
2003–04	First round	(Sweden) AIK	1–0	1–0	2–0
2003–04	Second round	(Israel) Maccabi Haifa	0–0	4–0	4–0
2003–04	Third round	(Turkey) Beşiktaş	3–2	2–0	5–2
2003–04	Fourth round	(Turkey) Gençlerbirliği	2–0	0–1	2–1
2003–04	Quarter-final	(France) Bordeaux	2–1	2–1	4–2
2003–04	Semi-final	(Spain) Villarreal	1–0	0–0	1–0
2003–04	Final	(France) Marseille	2–0 (N)		
2004–05	Round of 32	(Romania) Steaua București	2–0	0–2	2–2, 3–4 (p)
2008–09	First round	(Portugal) Marítimo	2–1	1–0	3–1
2008–09	Group G	(Denmark) Copenhagen	1–1	—N/a	2nd
2008–09	Group G	(Norway) Rosenborg	—N/a	4–0	2nd
2008–09	Group G	(Belgium) Club Brugge	1–1	—N/a	2nd
2008–09	Group G	(France) Saint-Étienne	—N/a	2–2	2nd
2008–09	Round of 32	(Ukraine) Dynamo Kyiv	2–2	1–1	3–3 (a)
2009–10	Play-off round	(Norway) Stabæk	4–1	3–0	7–1
2009–10	Group B	(France) Lille	3–1	1–1	1st
2009–10	Group B	(Italy) Genoa	3–2	2–1	1st
2009–10	Group B	(Czech Republic) Slavia Prague	1–1	2–2	1st
2009–10	Round of 32	(Belgium) Club Brugge	3–0	0–1	3–1
2009–10	Round of 16	(Germany) Werder Bremen	1–1	4–4	5–5 (a)
2009–10	Quarter-final	(Spain) Atlético Madrid	2–2	0–0	2–2 (a)
2011–12	Round of 32	(England) Stoke City	1–0	1–0	2–0
2011–12	Round of 16	(Netherlands) PSV Eindhoven	4–2	1–1	5–3
2011–12	Quarter-final	(Netherlands) AZ	4–0	1–2	5–2
2011–12	Semi-final	(Spain) Atlético Madrid	0–1	2–4	2–5
2013–14	Group A	(England) Swansea City	0–3	1–0	1st
2013–14	Group A	(Russia) Kuban Krasnodar	1–1	2–0	1st
2013–14	Group A	(Switzerland) St. Gallen	5–1	3–2	1st
2013–14	Round of 32	(Ukraine) Dynamo Kyiv	0–0	2–0	2–0
2013–14	Round of 16	(Bulgaria) Ludogorets Razgrad	1–0	3–0	4–0
2013–14	Quarter-final	(Switzerland) Basel	5–0 (a.e.t.)	0–3	5–3
2013–14	Semi-final	(Spain) Sevilla	3–1	0–2	3–3 (a)
2015–16	Round of 32	(Austria) Rapid Wien	6–0	4–0	10–0
2015–16	Round of 16	(Spain) Athletic Bilbao	2–1	0–1	2–2 (a)
2018–19	Round of 32	(Scotland) Celtic	1–0	2–0	3–0
2018–19	Round of 16	(Russia) Krasnodar	2–1	1–1	3–2
2018–19	Quarter-final	(Spain) Villarreal	2–0	3–1	5–1
2018–19	Semi-final	(England) Arsenal	2–4	1–3	3–7

== Intertoto Cup ==
Season	Round	Opposing team	Home	Away	Aggregate
1998	Third round	(Russia) Shinnik	4–1	0–1	4–2
1998	Semi-final	(Spain) Espanyol	2–0	1–0	3–0
1998	Final	Austria Salzburg	2–1	2–0	4–1
2005	Third round	(Belgium) Gent	2–0	0–0	2–0
2005	Semi-final	(Netherlands) Roda JC	4–0	0–0	4–0
2005	Final	(Germany) Hamburger SV	0–0	0–1	0–1

== European Super Cup/UEFA Super Cup ==
Season	Round	Opposing team	Home	Away	Neutral	Aggregate
1980	Final	(England) Nottingham Forest	1–0	1–2	—N/a	2–2 (a)
2004	Final	(Portugal) Porto	—N/a	—N/a	2–1	2–1

== Inter-Cities Fairs Cup ==
Season	Round	Opposing team	Home	Away	Neutral	Aggregate
1961–62	First round	(England) Nottingham Forest	2–0	5–1	—N/a	7–1
1961–62	Second round	(Switzerland) Lausanne	4–3	—N/a	—N/a	4–3
1961–62	Quarter-final	(Italy) Internazionale	2–0	3–3	—N/a	5–3
1961–62	Semi-final	(Hungary) MTK	3–0	7–3	—N/a	10–3
1961–62	Final	(Spain) Barcelona	6–2	1–1	—N/a	7–3
1962–63	First round	(Scotland) Celtic	4–2	2–2	—N/a	6–4
1962–63	Second round	(Scotland) Dunfermline Athletic	4–0	2–6	1–0	7–6
1962–63	Quarter-final	(Scotland) Hibernian	5–0	1–2	—N/a	6–2
1962–63	Semi-final	(Italy) Roma	3–0	0–1	—N/a	3–1
1962–63	Final	(Socialist Federal Republic of Yugoslavia) Dinamo Zagreb	2–0	2–1	—N/a	4–1
1963–64	First round	(Republic of Ireland) Shamrock Rovers	2–2	1–0	—N/a	3–2
1963–64	Second round	(Austria) Rapid Wien	3–2	0–0	—N/a	3–2
1963–64	Quarter-final	(Hungary) Újpest	5–2	1–3	—N/a	6–5
1963–64	Semi-final	(West Germany) 1. FC Köln	4–1	0–2	—N/a	4–3
1963–64	Final	(Spain) Zaragoza	1–2 (N)			
1964–65	First round	(Belgium) RFC Liegeois	1–1	1–3	—N/a	2–4
1965–66	First round	(Scotland) Hibernian	2–0	0–2	3–0	5–2
1965–66	Second round	(Switzerland) Basel	5–1	3–1	—N/a	8–2
1965–66	Third round	(England) Leeds United	0–1	1–1	—N/a	1–2
1966–67	First round	(West Germany) 1. FC Nürnberg	2–0	2–1	—N/a	4–1
1966–67	Second round	(Socialist Federal Republic of Yugoslavia) Red Star Belgrade	1–0	2–1	—N/a	3–1
1966–67	Third round	(England) Leeds United	0–2	1–1	—N/a	1–3
1968–69	First round	(Portugal) Sporting CP	4–1	0–4	—N/a	4–5
1969–70	First round	(Bulgaria) Slavia Sofia	1–1	0–2	—N/a	1–3
1970–71	First round	(Republic of Ireland) Cork Hibernians	3–1	3–0	—N/a	6–1
1970–71	Second round	(Belgium) Beveren	0–1	1–1	—N/a	1–2

== Finals ==
Year	Competition	Opposing Team	Score	Venue
1962	Fairs Cup	(Spain) Barcelona	7–3 on aggregate	Two-legged
1963	Fairs Cup	(Socialist Federal Republic of Yugoslavia) Dinamo Zagreb	4–1 on aggregate	Two-legged
1964	Fairs Cup	(Spain) Zaragoza	1–2	(Spain) Camp Nou, Barcelona
1980	Cup Winners' Cup	(England) Arsenal	0–0	(Belgium) Heysel Stadium, Brussels
1980	European Super Cup	(England) Nottingham Forest	2–2 on aggregate	Two-legged
1998	Intertoto Cup	Austria Salzburg	4–1 on aggregate	Two-legged
2000	Champions League	(Spain) Real Madrid	0–3	Stade de France, Saint-Denis
2001	Champions League	(Germany) Bayern Munich	1–1 (4–5 p)	(Italy) San Siro, Milan
2004	UEFA Cup	(France) Marseille	2–0	(Sweden) Ullevi, Gothenburg
2004	UEFA Super Cup	(Portugal) Porto	2–1	Stade Louis II, Monaco
2005	Intertoto Cup	(Germany) Hamburger SV	0–1 on aggregate	Two-legged

=== Overall record ===
Last update: 10 March 2020

Competition	Pld	W	D	L	GF	GA	GD
European Cup/Champions League	128	57	35	36	191	130	+61
Cup Winners' Cup	19	10	5	4	39	20	+19
UEFA Cup/Europa League	133	65	36	32	226	145	+81
Fairs Cup	52	29	10	12	112	67	+35
Super Cup	3	2	0	1	4	3	+1
Intertoto Cup	12	7	3	2	17	4	+13
Total	347	171	90	87	589	369	+220

== Honours ==
- UEFA Champions League

Runners-up: 1999–2000, 2000–01
Quarter-finals: 2002–03, 2006–07

- UEFA Cup Winners' Cup

Winners: 1979–80
Quarter-finals: 1967–68

- UEFA Cup / UEFA Europa League

Winners: 2003–04
Semi-finals: 2011–12, 2013–14, 2018–19
Quarter-finals: 1981–82, 1982–83, 1996–97, 2001–02, 2009–10

- UEFA Super Cup

Winners: 1980, 2004

- UEFA Intertoto Cup

Winners: 1998
Runners-up: 2005

- Fairs Cup

Winners: 1961–62, 1962–63
Runners-up: 1963–64

== Succession Boxes ==
Preceded by (Italy) Roma	Fairs Cup Champions; 1961–62; Runner up: (Spain) Barcelona	Succeeded by (Spain) Valencia
Preceded by (Spain) Valencia	Fairs Cup Champions; 1962–63; Runner up: (Socialist Federal Republic of Yugoslavia) Dinamo Zagreb	Succeeded by (Spain) Real Zaragoza
Preceded by (Spain) Barcelona	European Cup Winners Cup Champions; 1979–80; Runner up: (England) Arsenal	Succeeded by (Soviet Union) Dinamo Tbilisi
Preceded by (England) Nottingham Forest	UEFA Super Cup Champions; 1980–81; Runner up: (England) Nottingham Forest	Succeeded by Not played
Preceded by (Portugal) Porto	UEFA Cup Champions; 2003–04; Runner up: (France) Marseille	Succeeded by (Russia) CSKA Moscow
Preceded by (Italy) Milan	UEFA Super Cup Champions; 2004–05; Runner up: (Portugal) Porto	Succeeded by (England) Liverpool
