= Miguel Tendillo =

Spanish footballer (born 1961)

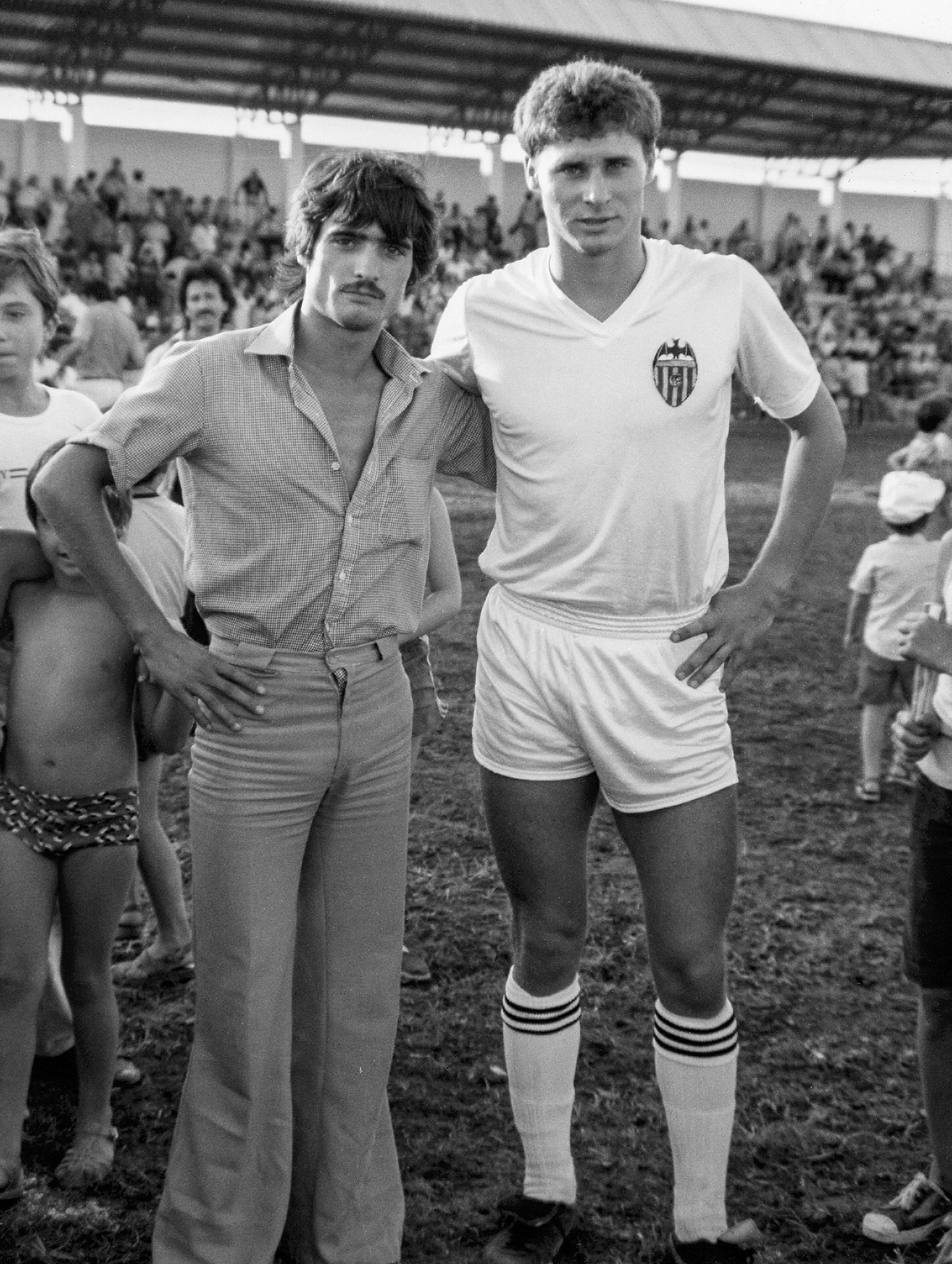
- Tendillo (right) in August 1980

Personal information
- Full name: Miguel Tendillo Belenguer
- Date of birth: 1 February 1961 (age 65)
- Place of birth: Moncada, Spain
- Height: 1.82 m (6 ft 0 in)
- Position: Centre-back

Youth career
- Moncada
- Valencia

Senior career*
Years	Team	Apps	(Gls)
1977–1979	Mestalla		
1979–1986	Valencia	208	(17)
1986–1987	Murcia	41	(2)
1987–1992	Real Madrid	98	(8)
1992–1993	Burgos	23	(1)
Total		370	(28)

International career
1977–1979	Spain U18	17	(1)
1979	Spain U19	3	(0)
1979	Spain U20	4	(0)
1979	Spain U21	2	(0)
1980–1988	Spain	27	(1)
- * Club domestic league appearances and goals

Miguel Tendillo Belenguer (born 1 February 1961) is a Spanish former professional footballer who played as a central defender.

Over 15 seasons, he amassed La Liga totals of 370 matches and 28 goals, appearing most notably for Valencia (eight years) and Real Madrid (five) and winning ten major titles.

Tendillo played nearly 30 times with Spain, representing the nation at the 1982 World Cup and Euro 1980.

== Club career ==
Born in Moncada, Valencia, Tendillo started his professional career with local Valencia CF, being first choice since the age of 18 (29 La Liga games in his first full season, which culminated with the UEFA Cup Winners' Cup conquest – he started in the final against Arsenal). On 1 May 1983, in the last fixture of the campaign, he scored the only goal in a 1–0 win over Real Madrid; the result meant that his team avoided relegation on goal difference, while the opposition lost the title to Athletic Bilbao by one point.

After 274 official appearances with Valencia, Tendillo moved to Real Murcia CF upon the Che's 1986 relegation, and produced another solid season, which earned him the interest of league powerhouse Real Madrid as a replacement to long-time injured player Antonio Maceda. A starter in three of his five years, he helped the club to three leagues and as many Supercopa de España trophies.

Tendillo signed for lowly Real Burgos CF for 1992–93, not being able to help them prevent relegation from the top division and retiring at the end of the campaign, aged 32. Subsequently, he returned to the Mestalla Stadium as youth system coordinator.

== International career ==
Tendillo earned his first cap for Spain on 21 May 1980, at not yet 20, appearing in a 2–2 friendly with Denmark in Copenhagen. Subsequently, he was called for that year's UEFA European Championship and the 1982 FIFA World Cup, totalling 27 matches and being deployed at right-back in the former competition.

=== International goals ===
#	Date	Venue	Opponent	Score	Result	Competition
1.	28 April 1982	Luis Casanova, Valencia, Spain	Switzerland	1–0	2–0	Friendly

== Personal life ==
Both Tendillo's father Miguel (born 1937) and son Alberto (1995) were footballers and defenders. The latter was also developed at Valencia.

== Honours ==
Valencia

- Copa del Rey: 1978–79
- UEFA Cup Winners' Cup: 1979–80
- UEFA Super Cup: 1980

Real Madrid

- La Liga: 1987–88, 1988–89, 1989–90
- Copa del Rey: 1988–89
- Supercopa de España: 1988, 1989, 1990
