= Pasieguito =

Spanish footballer and manager

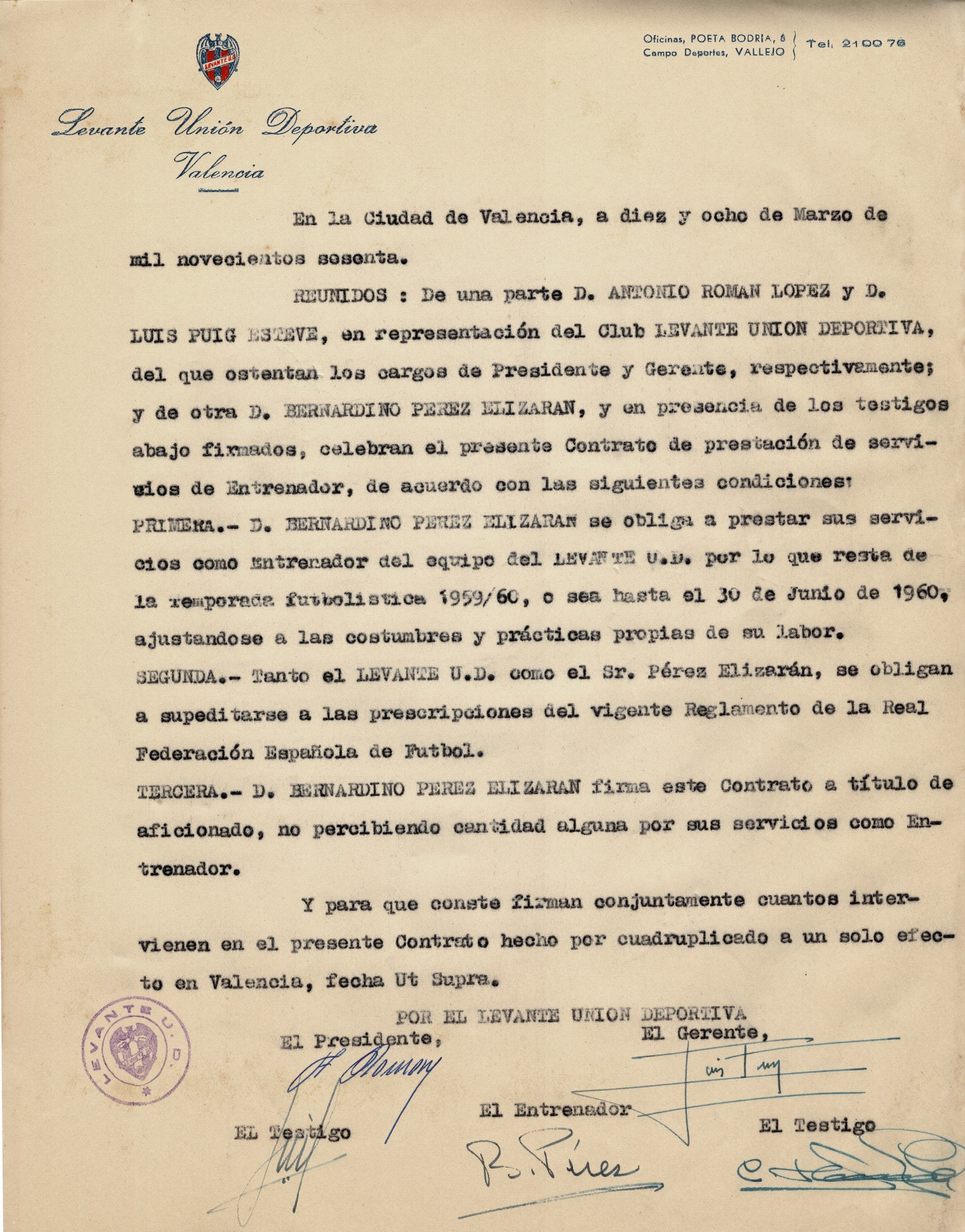
- Contract with Levante UD as player-manager, 1960.

Personal information
- Full name: Bernardino Pérez Elizarán
- Date of birth: 21 May 1925
- Place of birth: Hernani, Guipúzcoa, Spain
- Date of death: 21 October 2002 (aged 77)
- Place of death: Valencia, Spain
- Position: Midfielder

Youth career
- Real Sociedad

Senior career*
Years	Team	Apps	(Gls)
1942—1944	Valencia	3	(0)
1944—1945	Levante		
1945—1946	Valencia	7	(1)
1946—1948	Burgos CF		
1948—1959	Valencia	233	(65)
1959—1960	Levante	17	(5)
Total		260	(71)

International career
1954	Spain	3	(0)

Managerial career
- 1963—1964: Valencia
- 1964—1972: Sabadell
- 1972—1973: Granada
- 1973—1975: Sporting Gijón
- 1979: Valencia
- 1980–1982: Valencia
- 1984—1985: Sabadell
- * Club domestic league appearances and goals

Bernardino Pérez Elizarán (21 May 1925 Hernani, Guipúzcoa – 21 October 2002 Valencia), commonly known as Pasieguito, was a Spanish football player and manager.

As a player, in an 18-year career, Pasieguito played at three clubs, including multiple spells at Valencia CF. With Valencia he made 293 appearances overall and won the Copa del Rey in 1949 and 1954.

In a 22-year managerial career he managed four clubs, including Valencia over three distinct periods; he won the Copa del Rey in 1979 and the UEFA Super Cup in 1980. He was the most successful manager in the history of CE Sabadell: under his guidance, the Catalan club finished fourth in the 1968–69 La Liga and qualified for the 1969–70 Inter-Cities Fairs Cup, their only European appearance ever.

== Honours ==
=== As player ===
Valencia

- Copa del Rey: 1949, 1954
- Copa Eva Duarte: 1949

=== As manager ===
Valencia

- UEFA Super Cup: 1980
- Copa del Rey: 1979

Awards and achievements
Preceded by (England) Brian Clough	UEFA Super Cup winning manager 1980	Succeeded by (England) Tony Barton
