= Javier Maté =

Spanish footballer (born 1957)

Personal information
- Full name: Javier Maté Berzal
- Date of birth: 17 October 1957 (age 69)
- Place of birth: Aldealengua de Santa María, Spain
- Height: 1.78 m (5 ft 10 in)
- Position: Goalkeeper

Senior career*
| Years | Team | Apps | (Gls) |
- Gimnástica Arandina
| 1976–1979 | Real Madrid B | 50+ | (0) |
| 1979–1981 | Real Madrid | 1 | (0) |
| 1979–1981 | → Burgos (loan) | 50 | (0) |
| 1981–1993 | Celta Vigo | 328 | (0) |
| Total | | 429+ | (0) |

Managerial career
- 1996–1997: Celta B
- 2004: Celta B
- 2007–2009: Coruxo
- 2023: Coruxo
- * Club domestic league appearances and goals

Javier Maté Berzal (born 17 October 1957) is a Spanish former football player and manager

A goalkeeper, he spent most of his career with Celta Vigo, making 369 appearances in all competitions over 12 years. He totalled 163 games in La Liga in which he also represented Real Madrid and Burgos, winning the league and losing the 1979 Copa del Rey final in his two appearances for the former.

== Playing career ==
Born in Aldealengua de Santa María in the Province of Segovia, Maté was raised in Aranda de Duero, also in Castile and León. He began his career with Gimnástica Arandina in the regional leagues at age 14. After making his debut for the Spanish youth side, he was approached by professional clubs including Real Valladolid, Burgos and Real Zaragoza, and he chose Real Madrid.

Assigned to reserve team Real Madrid Castilla, Maté won two consecutive promotions as the team reached the Segunda División in 1978. On 3 June 1979, with the La Liga title already won, he made his first-team debut on the last day of the season at the Santiago Bernabeu Stadium; he conceded a goal from Racing Santander's Quique Setién within three minutes, but his team still won 5–1. Twenty-seven days later, in the Copa del Rey final, starting goalkeeper Mariano García Remón was injured with two minutes remaining and the team losing 1–0 to Valencia. Maté came on as a substitute in his only other game for the club, conceding another goal by Mario Kempes in a defeat.

Before 1979–80, Real Madrid loaned Maté and Vicente Blanco Brazales to fellow top-flight team Burgos. In a run to the semi-finals of the 1980–81 Copa del Rey, he won a penalty shootout after a 2–2 aggregate draw with Celta Vigo in the third round in January.

Maté joined Celta in 1981, remaining there until 1993, though the last of his 369 games was on 18 September 1991, a 2–2 home draw with Atlético Tomelloso that saw the team eliminated from the third round of the cup. He was part of four Celta squads that were promoted to La Liga, two of which as champion.

== Managerial career ==
Having already managed the team to relegation from the Segunda División B in 1996–97, Maté was put in charge of Celta B for the last six games of the third-tier season in 2003–04. His team reached the play-offs, which were won by Lleida; they were already ineligible for promotion due to the main squad's relegation.

Maté managed Coruxo in the Tercera División from 2007 to 2009, signing former Celta player and Russian international Valery Karpin at the start of his term. He was named manager again in the new fourth-tier Segunda Federación in February 2023, for the last 11 games of the season. He achieved survival with one game remaining.
