= Javier Subirats =

Spanish retired footballer (born 1957)

Personal information
- Full name: Javier Subirats Hernández
- Date of birth: 2 October 1957 (age 69)
- Place of birth: Paterna, Spain
- Height: 1.78 m (5 ft 10 in)
- Position: Midfielder

Youth career
- Paterna
- Valencia

Senior career*
| Years | Team | Apps | (Gls) |
| 1976–1978 | Mestalla | | |
| 1978–1990 | Valencia | 291 | (30) |
| 1978–1979 | → Girona (loan) | 27 | (6) |
| 1990–1991 | Orihuela Deportiva | 27 | (4) |
| 1991–1992 | Gandía | | |

International career
| 1978 | Spain U21 | 1 | (0) |
| 1979 | Spain amateur | 1 | (0) |

Managerial career
- Valencia (youth)
- 1996–1997: Villarreal
- 2005: Hércules (caretaker)
- 2012–: Jove Español (youth)
- * Club domestic league appearances and goals

Javier Subirats Hernández (born 2 October 1957) is a Spanish former footballer who played as a midfielder.

Most of his career was closely associated with Valencia, as a player and director. Over the course of 11 seasons, he amassed La Liga totals of 250 games and 24 goals.

== Playing career ==
Born in Paterna, Valencian Community, Subirats finished his youth career with local giants Valencia CF. He made his La Liga debut on 29 January 1978 in a 2–1 away win against Cádiz CF, and finished his first season with eight first-team appearances (seven as a substitute).

For the 1978–79 campaign, Subirats was loaned to Girona FC in the Segunda División B, because he had to perform compulsory military service in the city. After returning to the Che, he immediately became an important member of the main squad, contributing five games and one goal in the victorious 1979–80 European Cup Winners' Cup run, including 112 minutes in the final against Arsenal (0–0, penalty shootout win).

In 1986–87, Subirats posted career-bests of 41 matches and six goals, helping Valencia win the Segunda División championship. He finished his career with 354 official appearances for his main club, and retired in 1992 at nearly 35 after one-season spells with neighbouring sides Orihuela Deportiva CF (second tier) and CF Gandia (third).

== Managerial career ==
After retiring, Subirats began training in youth football, with Valencia. In the 1996–97 season he had his first experience with the professionals, coaching Villarreal CF through 20 games before being sacked, totalling six wins, four draws and ten losses.

Subirats then returned to Valencia as director of football, being in charge as the club won two leagues in the 2000s and the 2003–04 UEFA Cup, under Rafael Benítez who was a personal bet of his. Afterwards, he worked in the same capacity with yet another side in his native region, Hércules CF, promoting to the second division in 2005 after signing Juan Carlos Mandiá; following the dismissal of José Carlos Granero and before Mandiá's appointment, he managed the team in two games.

In 2005–06, Subirats rejoined Valencia as its sporting director, working with Hércules in the following two campaigns.

== Honours ==
Valencia

- UEFA Cup Winners' Cup: 1979–80
- UEFA Super Cup: 1980
- Segunda División: 1986–87
