= Ángel Castellanos =

Spanish footballer (1952–2024)

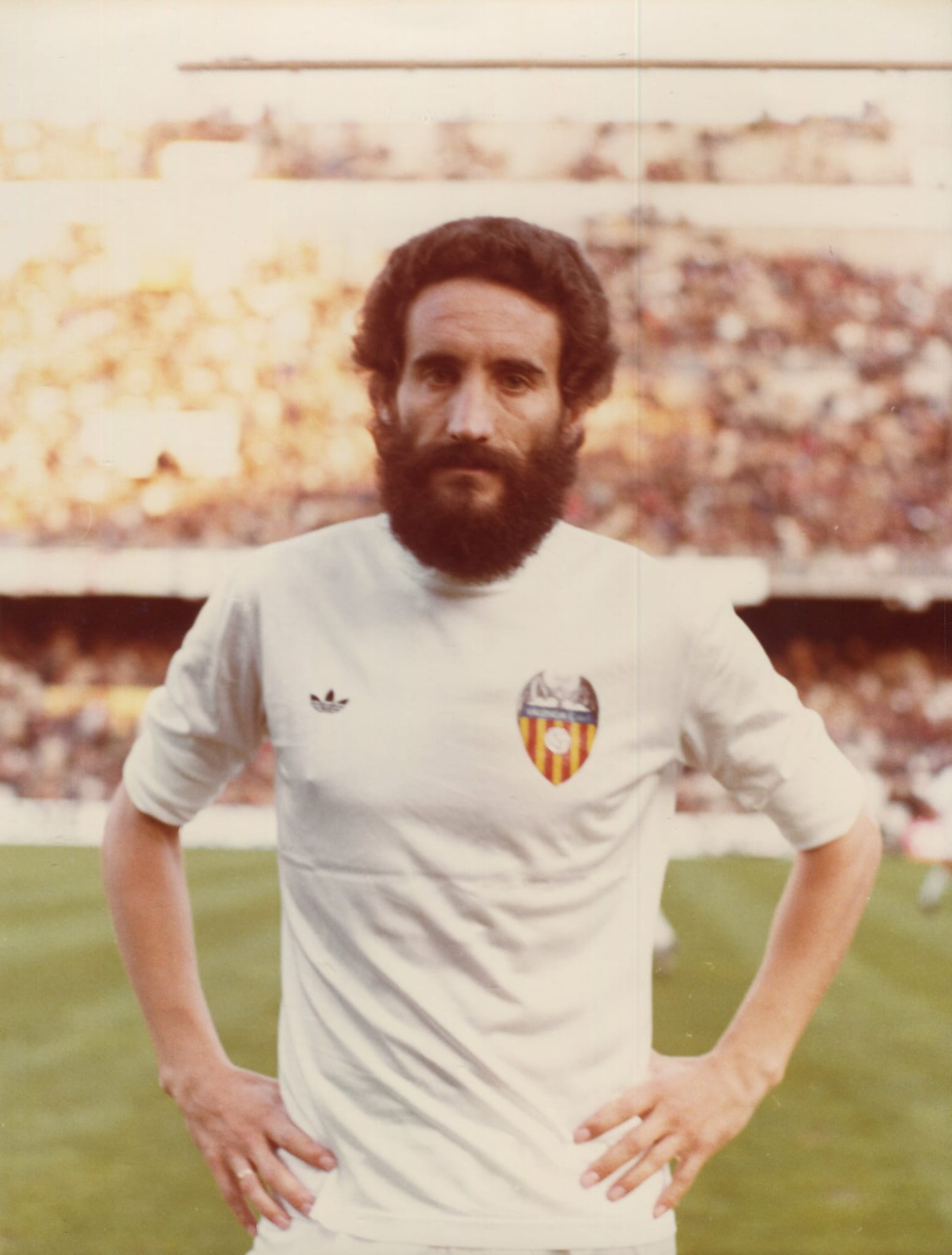
- Castellanos in the early 1980s

Personal information
- Full name: Ángel Castellanos Céspedes
- Date of birth: 15 November 1952
- Place of birth: Miguelturra, Castilla–La Mancha, Spain
- Date of death: 2 January 2024 (aged 71)
- Place of death: Granada, Andalusia, Spain
- Height: 1.80 m (5 ft 11 in)
- Positions: Centre-back; defensive midfielder

Senior career*
Years	Team	Apps	(Gls)
1969–1970	Manchego		
1971–1972	Sabadell		
1972–1976	Granada		
1976–1986	Valencia	363	
1986–1987	Granada		

International career
1974	Spain	3	(0)
- * Club domestic league appearances and goals

Ángel Castellanos Céspedes (15 November 1952 – 2 January 2024) was a Spanish association football centre-back and defensive midfielder. Sometimes known simply as Castellanos, he was recognized for his career within Granada and Valencia throughout the late 1970s to the mid-1980s, being part of the winning squads for the 1978–79 Copa del Rey, the 1979–80 European Cup Winners' Cup and the 1980 European Super Cup. He would also represent his home country of Spain in 1974.

== Club career ==
Castellanos was recognized for his slow and rough style when playing with it undergoing constant evolution as despite starting off as a central defender, would later convert into playing as a defensive midfielder. Due to this, he was cited as being an exceptional defender as well as sharing great compatibility with the clubs he played for. Castellanos would go into further detail into his unorthodox playstyle:

I never let them let me train me. It was my way of understanding football; how it was meant to be. I was striving to set an example. A teammate once admitted that he scored three goals against Espanyol in a match was because I told him that he could advance and that I stayed behind him.

Rising out of the lower ranks within CD Manchego of Ciudad Real, his first season with the club would occur during the 1969–70 Tercera División. He would make his official debut on 21 September 1969 at only sixteen years of age against Adra. He was then transferred to play for Sabadell where he would play in three matches during the 1971–72 La Liga where he would demonstrate his potential to Granada. His prominence would begin to decline after he would play as a center-back within the Andalusian team, making less appearances as each year went by.

Despite this, during the 1976–77 season, he would be transferred to Valencia where he would play as a midfielder throughout his seasons with the club. Throughout his time with the club, he would experience many highlights of his career as he would participate in the winning squads for the 1978–79 Copa del Rey, the 1979–80 European Cup Winners' Cup where he would score a goal in the penalty shoot-out and the 1980 European Super Cup.

This initial success would later stagnate, and the club would experience its only relegation during the 1985–86 La Liga following financial difficulties. This would lead the club to seek out younger players for the club including Fernando Gómez Colomer, Carlos Arroyo Ayala, Quique Sánchez Flores and Fernando Giner and phasing out older players. In total, Castellanos would make 363 appearances for the club throughout his decade with the club. He would return to play for Granada for the 1986–87 Segunda División B before his retirement.

== International career ==
Castellanos would play for the Spain national team in three matches by personal request of manager László Kubala. He would make his international debut against Denmark at Copenhagen during the UEFA Euro 1976 qualifiers on 25 December 1974 which ended in a 1–2 victory for the Spaniards. The other two matches would be friendlies against Argentina and Scotland in their home stadiums respectively.

== Personal life and death ==
In July 2017, Castellanos was named Honorary President of Granada CF intribute and homage to his career within the club. During the 2019–20 Copa del Rey, Castellanos was honored at a match between his two clubs of Granada and Valencia.

Castellanos died on 2 January 2024, at the age of 71. He had been suffering from Alzheimer's disease in the years prior to his death. Former Granada manager Lucas Alcaraz offered his condolences via social media.
