= 1980 European Super Cup =

| Nottingham Forest | Valencia |
| (England) | (Spain) |
| 2 | 2 |
- on aggregate Valencia won on away goals

First leg
| Nottingham Forest | Valencia |
| 2 | 1 |
- Date: 25 November 1980
- Venue: City Ground, Nottingham
- Referee: Alexis Ponnet (Belgium)
- Attendance: 12,463

Second leg
| Valencia | Nottingham Forest |
| 1 | 0 |
- Date: 17 December 1980
- Venue: Estadi Luis Casanova, Valencia
- Referee: Franz Wöhrer (Austria)
- Attendance: 29,038

The 1980 European Super Cup was played between 1979–80 European Cup winners Nottingham Forest and 1979–80 European Cup Winners' Cup winners Valencia, with Valencia winning on the away goals rule. Forest won the home leg 2–1, with both goals coming from Ian Bowyer. Valencia won the return at the Mestalla 1–0 thus winning on the away goals rule, this was the only time the UEFA Super Cup was settled by this method.

== Match details ==
=== First leg ===
25 November 1980

| Nottingham Forest (England) | 2–1 | (Spain) Valencia |
|---|---|---|
| Bowyer 57', 89' | Report | Darío Felman 47' |

City Ground, Nottingham
Attendance: 12,463
Referee: Alexis Ponnet (Belgium)

| Nottingham Forest | Valencia |

| GK | (England) Peter Shilton |
| DF | (England) Viv Anderson | (yellow card) 19' |
| DF | (Scotland) Frank Gray |
| MF | (Scotland) John McGovern (c) |
| DF | (England) Larry Lloyd | (yellow card) 88' |
| DF | (Scotland) Kenny Burns |
| MF | (England) Ian Bowyer |
| FW | (England) Peter Ward | (substituted off) 76' |
| MF | (England) Gary Mills |
| FW | (Scotland) Ian Wallace |
| MF | (Scotland) John Robertson | (yellow card) 56' |
Substitutions:
| FW | (Switzerland) Raimondo Ponte | (substituted on) 76' |
Manager:
(England) Brian Clough

GK
DF
DF
DF
DF
MF
MF
MF
MF
FW
FW
Substitutions:
FW
Manager:
(Spain) Pasieguito

(Spain) Carlos Pereira
(Spain) Ricardo Arias
(Spain) Ángel Castellanos | (yellow card) 41'
(Spain) Daniel Solsona
(Spain) Javier Subirats
(Uruguay) Fernando Morena
(Spain) José Carrete | (yellow card) 76'
(Spain) Manuel Botubot
(Spain) José Cerveró
(Spain) Enrique Saura
(Argentina) Darío Felman | (substituted off) 86'
(Paraguay) Orlando Giménez | (substituted on) 86'

=== Second leg ===
17 December 1980

| Valencia (Spain) | 1–0 | (England) Nottingham Forest |
|---|---|---|
| Fernando Morena 51' | Report |

Estadi Luis Casanova, Valencia
Attendance: 29,038
Referee: Franz Wöhrer (Austria)

| Valencia | Nottingham Forest |

| GK | (Spain) José Manuel Sempere |
| DF | (Spain) Ricardo Arias |
| DF | (Spain) Miguel Tendillo (c) |
| DF | (Spain) Ángel Castellanos |
| DF | (Spain) Daniel Solsona |
| MF | (Spain) Javier Subirats |
| MF | (Argentina) Mario Kempes |
| MF | (Uruguay) Fernando Morena |
| MF | (Spain) Manuel Botubot |
| FW | (Spain) José Cerveró |
| FW | (Spain) Enrique Saura |
Manager:
(Spain) Pasieguito

| GK | (England) Peter Shilton |
| DF | (England) Viv Anderson |
| DF | (England) Bryn Gunn |
| MF | (Scotland) John McGovern (c) |
| DF | (England) Larry Lloyd |
| DF | (Scotland) Kenny Burns |
| MF | (Northern Ireland) Martin O'Neill | (yellow card) 30' |
| MF | (Switzerland) Raimondo Ponte |
| FW | (England) Trevor Francis |
| FW | (Scotland) Ian Wallace |
| MF | (Scotland) Colin Walsh |
Manager:
(England) Brian Clough

== See also ==
- 1980–81 European Cup
- 1980–81 European Cup Winners' Cup
- 1980–81 Nottingham Forest F.C. season
- Nottingham Forest F.C. in European football
- Valencia CF in European football
