= Enrique Saura =

Spanish footballer

Personal information
- Full name: Enrique Saura Gil
- Date of birth: 2 August 1954 (age 72)
- Place of birth: Onda, Spain
- Height: 1.71 m (5 ft 7 in)
- Position: Attacking midfielder

Youth career
- 1969–1972: Onda
- 1972–1974: Castellón

Senior career*
Years	Team	Apps	(Gls)
1974–1975	Castellón	34	(6)
1975–1985	Valencia	306	(37)
1985–1988	Castellón	108	(7)
1988–1992	Onda		
Total		448+	(50+)

International career
1976	Spain amateur	2	(0)
1980–1981	Spain B	3	(0)
1978–1982	Spain	23	(4)
- * Club domestic league appearances and goals

Enrique Saura Gil (born 2 August 1954) is a Spanish former professional footballer who played as an attacking midfielder.

He represented mainly Castellón and Valencia, appearing in 400 official games with the latter club over ten seasons and winning three major titles.

Saura was part of the Spain squads at the 1982 World Cup and Euro 1980.

== Club career ==
Saura was born in Onda, Province of Castellón, Valencian Community. During his career, he played exclusively in his native region: after starting at CD Castellón he signed with local giants Valencia CF, where he would be an undisputed starter throughout his ten-year spell as well as captain, helping the side to win three titles in one year, most notably the 1979–80 European Cup Winners' Cup, while he added 37 goals in La Liga and 57 in all competitions.

After leaving Valencia when his contract was not renewed, the 31-year-old Saura returned to Castellón for a further three Segunda División seasons. He then moved to amateurs CD Onda, his very first youth club, where he retired at the age of 37.

== International career ==
Saura earned 23 caps for the Spain national team, the first coming on 8 November 1978 in a friendly against France. During Valencia's stellar 1979–80 he began being a regular for his country, and was called up for the UEFA Euro 1980 and the 1982 FIFA World Cup tournaments; in the latter, he scored one of his four international goals, netting in a 2–1 win over Yugoslavia after he had been on the pitch of a familiar Estadio Luis Casanova for only three minutes.

Saura also represented Spain at the 1976 Summer Olympics in Montreal, Canada, as the nation was eliminated in the first round.

== Career statistics ==
Scores and results list Spain's goal tally first, score column indicates score after each Saura goal.

List of international goals scored by Enrique Saura
No.	Date	Venue	Opponent	Score	Result	Competition
1	9 December 1979	Trisiron, Limassol, Cyprus	Cyprus	3–1	3–1	UEFA Euro 1980 qualifying
2	21 May 1980	Idrætsparken, Copenhagen, Denmark	Denmark	1–0	2–2	Friendly
3	14 October 1981	Luis Casanova, Valencia, Spain	Luxembourg	2–0	3–0	Friendly
4	20 June 1982	Luis Casanova, Valencia, Spain	Yugoslavia	2–1	2–1	1982 FIFA World Cup

== Honours ==
Valencia

- Copa del Rey: 1978–79
- UEFA Cup Winners' Cup: 1979–80
- UEFA Super Cup: 1980
