= SD Gimnástica Arandina =

Gimnástica Arandina
- Full name: Sociedad Deportiva Gimnástica Arandina
- Founded: 1948
- Dissolved: 1987
- Ground: El Montecillo, Aranda, Castile and León, Spain
- Capacity: 6,000
- 1986–87: 3ª – Group 8, retired
Home colours	Away colours

Sociedad Deportiva Gimnástica Arandina was a Spanish football team based in Aranda de Duero, in the autonomous community of Castile and León. Founded in 1948, it was dissolved in 1987.

== History ==
=== Club background ===
- Club Deportivo Aranda - (1920–23)
- Sociedad Gimnástica Arandina - (1923–25)
- Aranda Fútbol Club - (1925–27)
- Gimnástica Arandina (I) - (1927–33)
- Cultural Arandina - (1932)
- Club Deportivo Imperial - (1933)
- Gimnástica Arandina - (1948–87)
- Arandina Club de Fútbol - (1987–)

== Season to season ==
Season	Tier	Division	Place	Copa del Rey
1948–1955	—	Regional	—	
1955–56	4	1ª Reg.	2nd	
1956–57	3	3ª	14th	
1957–58	3	3ª	12th	
1958–59	3	3ª	11th	
1959–60	3	3ª	7th	
1960–61	3	3ª	13th	
1961–62	3	3ª	11th	
1962–63	3	3ª	13th	
1963–64	3	3ª	10th	
1964–65	3	3ª	8th	
1965–66	3	3ª	13th	
1966–67	3	3ª	6th	
1967–68	3	3ª	12th	
1968–69	4	1ª Reg.	1st	
1969–70	4	1ª Reg.	2nd	
1970–71	5	1ª Reg.	1st	

Season	Tier	Division	Place	Copa del Rey
1971–72	4	Reg. Pref.	6th	
1972–73	4	Reg. Pref.	5th	
1973–74	4	Reg. Pref.	11th	
1974–75	4	Reg. Pref.	10th	
1975–76	4	Reg. Pref.	3rd	
1976–77	4	Reg. Pref.	1st	
1977–78	4	3ª	9th	First round
1978–79	4	3ª	11th	First round
1979–80	4	3ª	1st	First round
1980–81	3	2ª B	20th	First round
1981–82	4	3ª	6th	
1982–83	4	3ª	3rd	Second round
1983–84	4	3ª	10th	First round
1984–85	4	3ª	12th	
1985–86	4	3ª	14th	
1986–87	4	3ª	(R)	

- 1 season in Segunda División B
- 21 seasons in Tercera División
