= Daniel Solsona =

Spanish footballer

Personal information
- Full name: Daniel Solsona Puig
- Date of birth: 18 January 1952 (age 74)
- Place of birth: Cornellà, Spain
- Height: 1.71 m (5 ft 7 in)
- Position: Midfielder

Youth career
- Español

Senior career*
Years	Team	Apps	(Gls)
1970–1978	Español	234	(39)
1978–1983	Valencia	139	(26)
1983–1986	Bastia	86	(9)
1986	Racing Paris	2	(0)
1986–1987	Rennes	26	(0)
1987–1989	Sant Andreu		
Total		487	(74)

International career
1970	Spain U18	1	(0)
1971–1976	Spain amateur	9	(4)
1973–1981	Spain	7	(0)

Managerial career
- 1993–1994: Can Vidalet (youth)
- 1994–1995: Can Vidalet
- 1996–1997: Sant Quirze
- 1997: Vilassar Mar
- 1998–2001: Sant Quirze
- 2002–2003: Lleida (assistant)
- 2017: Vilanova
- * Club domestic league appearances and goals

Daniel Solsona Puig (born 18 January 1952) is a Spanish former professional footballer who played as a midfielder.

== Club career ==
Born in Cornellà de Llobregat, Barcelona, Catalonia, Solsona played in 373 La Liga games over 13 seasons in which he represented RCD Español and Valencia CF, scoring 65 goals in the process. He made his debut in the competition at only 18, featuring for the former in a 0–0 home draw against Real Sociedad on 27 September 1970.

In summer 1978, Solsona signed for the Che, scoring eight goals in 31 matches in his first year to help the team to the seventh position and also winning the Copa del Rey. Subsequently, he added eight appearances as the club conquered the UEFA Cup Winners' Cup, including the full 120 minutes of the final against Arsenal.

Solsona moved abroad at the age of 31, going on to spend four years at the service of SC Bastia and Stade Rennais F.C. in Ligue 1 interspersed with a very short spell with Racing Club de France football Colombes 92. He returned home in 1987, retiring after two seasons in the lower leagues with UE Sant Andreu.

== International career ==
Solsona earned seven caps for Spain, in roughly eight years. His first appearance was on 17 October 1973, in a 0–0 friendly with Turkey in Istanbul.

== Honours ==
Valencia

- Copa del Rey: 1978–79
- UEFA Cup Winners' Cup: 1979–80
- UEFA Super Cup: 1980
