= 1954 Copa del Generalísimo =

52nd Copa del Rey

Tournament details
- Country: Spain
- Teams: 14

Final positions
- Champions: Valencia CF (3rd title)
- Runners-up: FC Barcelona

Tournament statistics
- Matches played: 27
- Goals scored: 99 (3.67 per match)

The 1954 Copa del Generalísimo was the 52nd staging of the Spanish Cup. The competition began on 2 May 1954 and concluded on 20 June 1954 with the final.

== Round of 16 ==
Team 1	Agg.	Team 2	1st leg	2nd leg
CF Barcelona	4–3	RC Deportivo de La Coruña	4–0	0–3
RC Celta de Vigo	1–3	Sevilla CF	1–1	0–2
CD Alavés	1–9	Real Madrid CF	1–2	0–7
Club Atlético de Bilbao	3–3	Real Valladolid Deportivo	3–2	0–1
Club Atlético de Madrid	2–5	RCD Español	1–3	1–2
UD Las Palmas	1–4	Real Sociedad de Fútbol	0–0	1–4

Source: RSSSF

- Tiebreaker

Team 1	Score	Team 2
Club Atlético de Bilbao	4–1	Real Valladolid Deportivo

- Bye: Valencia CF and Real Santander SD.

== Quarter-finals ==
Team 1	Agg.	Team 2	1st leg	2nd leg
Real Santander SD	3–4	Real Madrid CF	3–1	0–3
CF Barcelona	5–3	Club Atlético de Bilbao	4–2	1–1
Real Sociedad de Fútbol	3–9	Valencia CF	2–5	1–4
Sevilla CF	6–6	RCD Español	4–0	2–6

Source: RSSSF

- Tiebreaker

Team 1	Score	Team 2
Sevilla CF	2–1	RCD Español

== Semi-finals ==
Team 1	Agg.	Team 2	1st leg	2nd leg
Real Madrid CF	2–3	CF Barcelona	1–0	1–3
Sevilla CF	1–4	Valencia CF	0–1	1–3

Source: RSSSF

== Final ==
Team 1	Score	Team 2
Valencia CF	3–0	CF Barcelona

Copa del Generalísimo
winners
Valencia CF
3rd title
