= Ricardo Arias (footballer) =

Spanish retired footballer

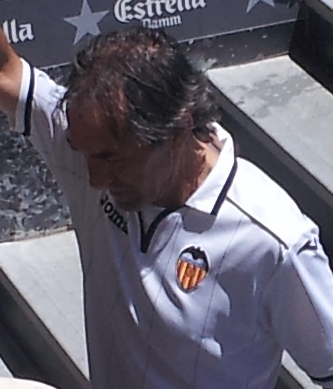

Personal information
- Full name: Ricardo Penella Arias
- Date of birth: 25 February 1957 (age 69)
- Place of birth: Catarroja, Spain
- Height: 1.82 m (6 ft 0 in)
- Position: Sweeper

Youth career
- Benimar
- Valencia

Senior career*
Years	Team	Apps	(Gls)
1976–1992	Valencia	411	(3)
1992–1993	Castellón	35	(0)
Total		446	(3)

International career
1979	Spain amateur	2	(0)
1981	Spain B	2	(0)
1979	Spain	1	(0)
- * Club domestic league appearances and goals

Ricardo Penella Arias (born 25 February 1957) is a Spanish former professional footballer who played as a sweeper.

He appeared in 501 competitive games for Valencia, winning three major titles including the 1980 Cup Winners' Cup. In La Liga, he played 377 matches and scored twice.

== Club career ==
Born in Catarroja, Valencian Community, Arias spent 16 of his 17 professional seasons – 15 in La Liga – with local club Valencia CF. He made his debut in the competition on 7 November 1976 by coming on as a late substitute in a 3–1 home win against CD Málaga, and scored his first goal on 5 March 1978 to help defeat Sevilla FC 3–0 also at the Mestalla Stadium. He contributed eight matches and one goal in the team's victorious run in the UEFA Cup Winners' Cup, converting his attempt in the shootout in the final (0–0 after 120 minutes, in Brussels).

Subsequently, Arias went on to become a defensive mainstay for the Che. They suffered relegation at the end of 1985–86, being immediately promoted the following campaign with one goal in 34 games from the player.

After only 16 appearances in 1991–92, the 35-year-old Arias signed for neighbouring CD Castellón in the Segunda División, closing out his career at the end of the season.

== International career ==
Arias earned one cap for Spain: on 26 September 1979, he played the first half of a 1–1 friendly draw with Portugal at Balaídos Stadium.

== Post-retirement ==
In November 2014, Arias declared in an interview he was bankrupt, making ends meet by having odd jobs. Shortly after, the father of four returned to Valencia to work in the club's social department.

== Honours ==
Valencia

- Copa del Rey: 1978–79
- UEFA Cup Winners' Cup: 1979–80
- UEFA Super Cup: 1980
- Segunda División: 1986–87
