= José Carrete =

Spanish footballer

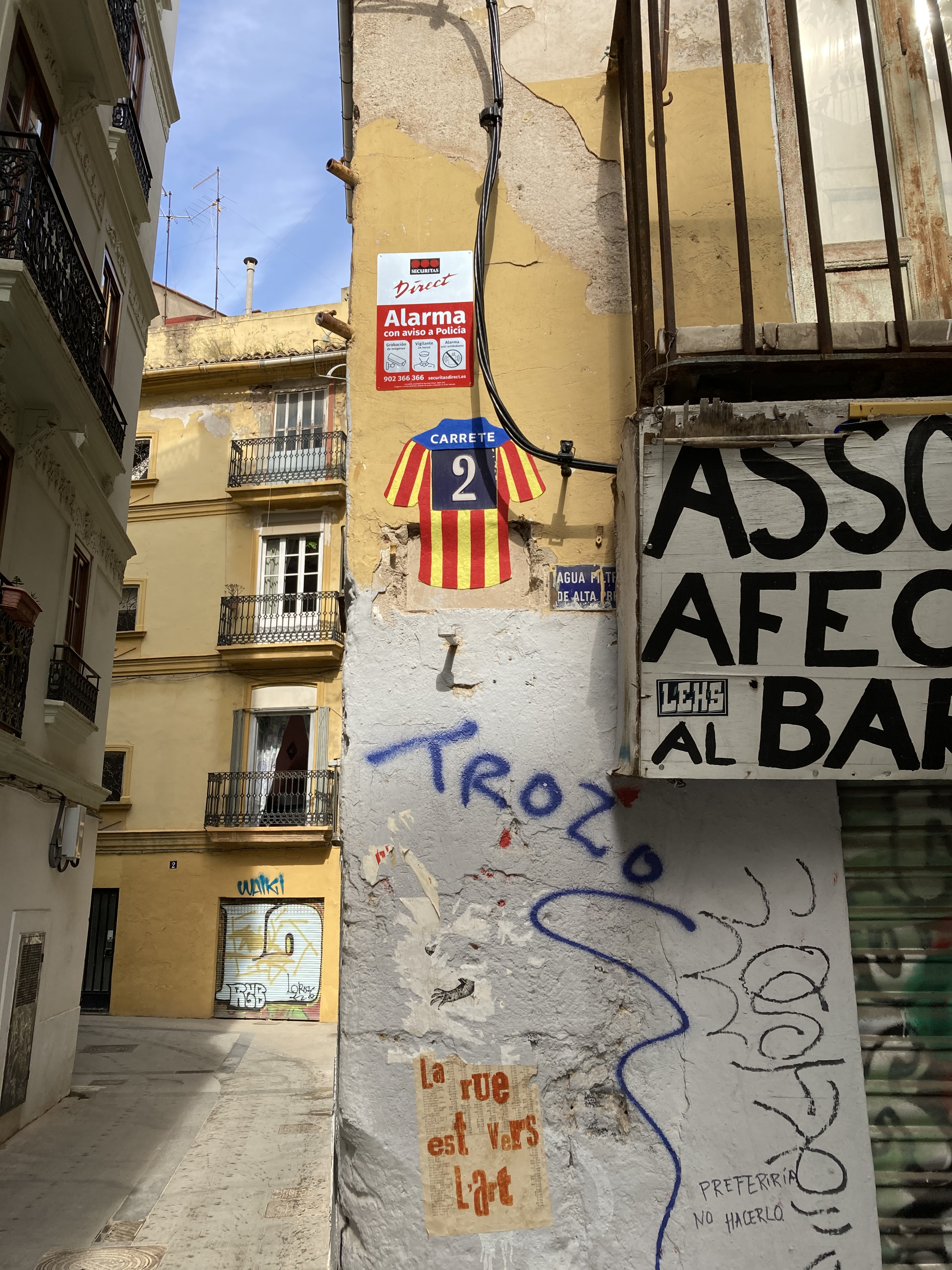
- A drawing on the wall (center) in a street in Valencia honouring Carrete

Personal information
- Full name: José Carrete de Julián
- Date of birth: 5 April 1951 (age 75)
- Place of birth: Turón, Spain
- Height: 1.67 m (5 ft 6 in)
- Position: Defender

Senior career*
Years	Team	Apps	(Gls)
1969–1971	Caudal		
1971–1976	Oviedo	147	(3)
1976–1983	Valencia	208	(2)

International career
1978	Spain	2	(0)

Managerial career
- 1983–1985: Lenense
- 1985–1986: Vetusta
- 1986–1987: Oviedo
- 1988–1991: Cultural Leonesa
- 1991–1993: Ourense
- 1994–1996: Langreo
- 1997–1998: Ponferradina
- 1999: Ponferradina
- 2000: Talavera
- 2000–2001: Gimnástica Torrelavega
- 2002: Vecindario
- 2006–2008: Altea
- 2010–2012: Sanluqueño
- * Club domestic league appearances and goals

José Carrete de Julián (born 5 April 1951) is a Spanish former football manager and player who played as a defender in La Liga in the 1970s and 1980s.

== Career ==
Carrete, began playing football with Caudal Deportivo. He played for Real Oviedo between 1971 and 1976. Carrete helped the club gain promotion from the Segunda División during the 1974–75 season, although following their subsequent relegation he was transferred to Valencia in 1976.

Valencia won the 1979 Copa del Rey, and Carrete was then a member of the successful Valencia side that won the 1980 European Cup Winners' Cup Final against Arsenal. His last games for Valencia were in the 1982–83 season.

Carrete made two appearances for the Spain national football team.

After he retired from playing football, Carrete became a coach. The highlight of his 20-year managerial career was being appointed manager of Segunda División's Real Oviedo after managing the club's affiliate, Real Oviedo Vetusta. Carrete also had a successful spell managing Cultural y Deportiva Leonesa for several seasons.

== Personal life ==
In 2015, Carrete suffered a stroke and was in a coma for days before recovering.
