= 1979–80 European Cup Winners' Cup =

Final positions
- Champions: (Spain) Valencia (1st title)
- Runners-up: (England) Arsenal

Tournament statistics
- Matches played: 63

The 1979–80 season was the 20th season of the European Cup Winners' Cup, a football tournament organised by UEFA for the cup winners from each of its member associations. The competition was won by Spanish club Valencia, who beat Arsenal of England on penalties after a goalless final at the Heysel Stadium in Brussels, Belgium. It was the only Cup Winners' Cup to be decided on penalties (although two previous finals had required replays). It was Valencia's third European title, adding to the two Inter-Cities Fairs Cup titles they won in the 1960s.

== Preliminary round ==
Team 1	Agg.	Team 2	1st leg	2nd leg
Rangers (Scotland)	3–0	(Norway) Lillestrøm	1–0	2–0
B 1903 (Denmark)	7–0	(Cyprus) APOEL	6–0	1–0

=== First leg ===
15 August 1979

B 1903 (Denmark)	6–0	(Cyprus) APOEL
Haarbye 12'; Larsen 19'; B. Kristiansen 47', 56'; Thygesen 61', 88'

Gentofte Stadion, Copenhagen
Attendance: 2,000
Referee: Rolf Ericsson (Sweden)

=== Second leg ===
8 September 1979

APOEL (Cyprus)	0–1	(Denmark) B 1903
		Damm 67'

GSP Stadium, Nicosia
Attendance: 2,500
Referee: Aleksandar Nikić (Yugoslavia)

B 1903 won 7–0 on aggregate.

== First round ==
Team 1	Agg.	Team 2	1st leg	2nd leg
Dynamo Moscow (Soviet Union)	w/o	(Albania) Vllaznia Shkodër	–	–
Sliema Wanderers (Malta)	2–9	(Portugal) Boavista	2–1	0–8
Cliftonville (Northern Ireland)	0–8	(France) Nantes	0–1	0–7
Young Boys (Switzerland)	2–8	(Romania) Steaua București	2–2	0–6
Reipas Lahti (Finland)	0–2	(Luxembourg) Aris Bonnevoie	0–1	0–1
ÍA (Iceland)	0–6	(Spain) Barcelona	0–1	0–5
B 1903 (Denmark)	2–6	(Spain) Valencia	2–2	0–4
Rangers (Scotland)	2–1	(West Germany) Fortuna Düsseldorf	2–1	0–0
Arsenal (England)	2–0	(Turkey) Fenerbahçe	2–0	0–0
Wrexham (Wales)	5–7	(East Germany) Magdeburg	3–2	2–5 (aet)
Panionios (Greece)	5–3	(Netherlands) Twente	4–0	1–3
IFK Göteborg (Sweden)	2–1	(Republic of Ireland) Waterford	1–0	1–1
Wacker Innsbruck (Austria)	1–3	(Czechoslovakia) Lokomotíva Košice	1–2	0–1
Beerschot (Belgium)	1–2	(Socialist Federal Republic of Yugoslavia) Rijeka	0–0	1–2
Arka Gdynia (Poland)	3–4	(Bulgaria) Beroe Stara Zagora	3–2	0–2
Juventus (Italy)	3–2	(Hungary) Győri ETO	2–0	1–2

=== First leg ===
12 September 1979

Sliema Wanderers (Malta)	2–1	(Portugal) Boavista
Tortell 33' (pen.), 67' (pen.)		Eliseu 78' (pen.)

The Stadium, Gżira
Attendance: 5,000
Referee: Bruno Galler (Switzerland)

19 September 1979

Young Boys (Switzerland)	2–2	(Romania) Steaua București
Zwygart 42' (pen.); Schönenberger 78'		Stoica 38'; Iordănescu 44'

Wankdorf, Bern
Attendance: 7,000
Referee: Sándor Kuti (Hungary)

19 September 1979

Reipas Lahti (Finland)	0–1	(Luxembourg) Aris Bonnevoie
	Report	Schiltz 57'

Kisapuisto, Lahti
Attendance: 805
Referee: Rolf Eriksson (Norway)

19 September 1979

Juventus (Italy)	2–0	(Hungary) Győri ETO
Pozsgai 64' (o.g.); Cabrini 73' (pen.)

Turin

=== Second leg ===
3 October 1979

Steaua București (Romania)	6–0	(Switzerland) Young Boys
Nițu 1'; Sameș 7', 65'; Aelenei 47'; Răducanu 56'; Zahiu 72'

Stadionul Steaua, Bucharest
Attendance: 6,700
Referee: Talal Tokat (Turkey)

Steaua București won 8–2 on aggregate.

3 October 1979

Aris Bonnevoie (Luxembourg)	1–0	(Finland) Reipas Lahti
Colling 32'	Report

Stade Camille Polfer, Luxembourg City
Attendance: 3,000
Referee: Louis Delsemme (Belgium)

Aris Bonnevoie won 2–0 on aggregate.

3 October 1979

Győri ETO (Hungary)	2–1	(Italy) Juventus
Furino 4' (o.g.); Póczik 23'		Causio 52'

Győr

Juventus won 3–2 on aggregate.

5 October 1979

Boavista (Portugal)	8–0	(Malta) Sliema Wanderers
Aílton 7'; Júlio Carlos 16', 28', 57'; Moínhos 34'; Salvador 53'; Folha 63'; Óscar 90'

Estádio do Bessa, Porto
Attendance: 25,000
Referee: Antonio Tomeo Palanques (Spain)

Boavista won 9–2 on aggregate.

== Second round ==
Team 1	Agg.	Team 2	1st leg	2nd leg
Dynamo Moscow (Soviet Union)	1–1 (a)	(Portugal) Boavista	0–0	1–1
Nantes (France)	5–3	(Romania) Steaua București	3–2	2–1
Aris Bonnevoie (Luxembourg)	2–11	(Spain) Barcelona	1–4	1–7
Valencia (Spain)	4–2	(Scotland) Rangers	1–1	3–1
Arsenal (England)	4–3	(East Germany) Magdeburg	2–1	2–2
Panionios (Greece)	1–2	(Sweden) IFK Göteborg	1–0	0–2
Lokomotíva Košice (Czechoslovakia)	2–3	(Socialist Federal Republic of Yugoslavia) Rijeka	2–0	0–3
Beroe Stara Zagora (Bulgaria)	1–3	(Italy) Juventus	1–0	0–3 (aet)

=== First leg ===
24 October 1979

Dynamo Moscow (Soviet Union)	0–0	(Portugal) Boavista

Central Lenin Stadium, Moscow
Attendance: 5,000
Referee: Svein-Inge Thime (Norway)

24 October 1979

Aris Bonnevoie (Luxembourg)	1–4	(Spain) Barcelona
Mathes 64'	Report	Simonsen 53', 77', 90'; Rexach 66'

Stade Josy Barthel, Luxembourg City
Attendance: 6,000
Referee: Jan Redelfs (Germany)

24 October 1979

Beroe Stara Zagora (Bulgaria)	1–0	(Italy) Juventus
Stoyanov 80' (pen.)

Stara Zagora

=== Second leg ===
7 November 1979

Boavista (Portugal)	1–1	(Soviet Union) Dynamo Moscow
Moínhos 34'		Minayev 26'

Estádio do Bessa, Porto
Attendance: 27,000
Referee: Clive White (England)

1–1 on aggregate. Dynamo Moscow won on away goals.

7 November 1979

Barcelona (Spain)	7–1	(Luxembourg) Aris Bonnevoie
Krankl 14', 27', 44'; Heredia 16', 56'; Carrasco 57'; Canito 82'	Report	Tullius 47'

Camp Nou, Barcelona
Attendance: 60,000
Referee: Mário Luís (Portugal)

Barcelona won 11–2 on aggregate.

7 November 1979

Juventus (Italy)	3–0 (a.e.t)	(Bulgaria) Beroe Stara Zagora
Scirea 8'; Causio 104'; Verza 111'

Turin

Juventus won 3–1 on aggregate.

== Quarter-finals ==
Team 1	Agg.	Team 2	1st leg	2nd leg
Dynamo Moscow (Soviet Union)	3–4	(France) Nantes	0–2	3–2
Barcelona (Spain)	3–5	(Spain) Valencia	0–1	3–4
Arsenal (England)	5–1	(Sweden) IFK Göteborg	5–1	0–0
Rijeka (Socialist Federal Republic of Yugoslavia)	0–2	(Italy) Juventus	0–0	0–2

=== First leg ===
5 March 1980

Rijeka (Socialist Federal Republic of Yugoslavia)	0–0	(Italy) Juventus

Rijeka

=== Second leg ===
19 March 1980

Juventus (Italy)	2–0	(Socialist Federal Republic of Yugoslavia) Rijeka
Causio 5'; Bettega 72'

Turin

Juventus won 2–0 on aggregate.

== Semi-finals ==
Team 1	Agg.	Team 2	1st leg	2nd leg
Nantes (France)	2–5	(Spain) Valencia	2–1	0–4
Arsenal (England)	2–1	(Italy) Juventus	1–1	1–0

=== First leg ===
9 April 1980

Arsenal (England)	1–1	(Italy) Juventus
Bettega 84' (o.g.)		Cabrini 11'

Highbury, London
Referee: Charles Corver (holland)

=== Second leg ===
23 April 1980

Juventus (Italy)	0–1	(England) Arsenal
		Vaessen 88'

Turin

Arsenal won 2–1 on aggregate.

== Final ==
14 May 1980
20:15 CEST

Arsenal (England)	0–0 (a.e.t.)	(Spain) Valencia
	Report
Penalties
Brady (penalty missed); Stapleton (penalty scored); Sunderland (penalty scored); Talbot (penalty scored); Hollins (penalty scored); Rix (penalty missed)	4–5	(penalty missed) Kempes; (penalty scored) Solsona; (penalty scored) Rodríguez; (penalty scored) Castellanos; (penalty scored) Bonhof; (penalty scored) Arias

Heysel Stadium, Brussels
Attendance: 40,000
Referee: Vojtech Christov (Czechoslovakia)

== See also ==
- 1979–80 European Cup
- 1979–80 UEFA Cup
