= 1978–79 Copa del Rey =

77th Copa del Rey

Tournament details
- Country: Spain
- Teams: 156

Final positions
- Champions: Valencia (5th title)
- Runners-up: Real Madrid

Tournament statistics
- Matches played: 307

The 1978–79 Copa del Rey was the 77th staging of the Spanish Cup. The competition began on 20 September 1978 and concluded on 30 June 1979 with the final. Valencia won the cup.

== First round ==
Team 1	Agg.	Team 2	1st leg	2nd leg
Getxo	2–4	Bilbao Athletic	1–2	1–2
Toledo	3–9	Atlético Madrid	1–5	2–4
Real Sociedad	8–1	Tudelano	6–1	2–0
Numancia	2–4	Burgos	2–1	0–3
Celta	4–0	Alondras	0–0	4–0
Hércules	3–1	Vall de Uxó	0–1	3–0
Malgrat	0–9	Español	0–1	0–8
Castilla	8–0	Don Benito	6–0	2–0
Granada	8–1	Industrial Melilla	7–1	1–0
Chantrea	3–9	Alavés	1–4	2–5
Gernica	0–4	Osasuna	0–1	0–3
Sevilla Atlético	1–7	Xerez	0–2	1–5
Logroñés	7–5	Arandina	5–1	2–4
Cacereño	2–2 (3–5 p)	Díter Zafra	2–1	0–1
Torrejón	6–0	Arganda	4–0	2–0
Acero	3–2	Onteniente	3–0	0–2
Sant Andreu	4–0	Ibiza	2–0	2–0
Erandio	3–1	Lemona	3–1	0–0
Basconia	4–3	Peña Sport	2–2	2–1
Gandía	4–1	Eldense	4–0	0–1
Andorra	4–2	Badalona	1–0	3–2
Manchego	1–2	Carabanchel	1–0	0–2
Málaga	4–1	Linares	3–1	1–0
Atlético Baleares	5–6	Crevillente	4–2	1–4
Almería	3–1	Atlético Malagueño	1–0	2–1
Melilla	3–4	Úbeda	2–1	1–3
Mérida	2–1	Ciempozuelos	0–1	2–0
Levante	5–2	Villena	5–0	0–2
Linense	5–6	Jerez Industrial	3–2	2–4
Alcira	1–4	Cartagena	1–2	0–2
Betis	2–2 (5–3 p)	San Fernando	2–1	0–1
Jaén	2–1	Calvo Sotelo	0–1	2–0
Deportivo Gijón	0–2	Oviedo	0–0	0–2
Compostela	2–4	Lugo	1–3	1–1
Orense	5–1	Gran Peña	4–1	1–0
Extremadura	1–2	Pegaso	1–1	0–1
Sestao	3–0	Tolosa	0–0	3–0
Langreo	3–4	Santoña	3–2	0–2
La Cava	0–8	Girona	0–3	0–5
Sabadell	1–4	Lleida	0–0	1–4
Ceuta	3–2	Algeciras	1–1	2–1
Villarreal	4–4 (3–2 p)	Castellón	1–1	3–3
Español Raspeig	6–2	Paterna	3–0	3–2
Talavera	4–3	Badajoz	3–1	1–2
Monzón	2–4	Huesca	2–2	0–2
Córdoba	6–2	Valdepeñas	5–1	1–1
Naval	1–3	Turón	0–1	1–2
Rota	3–10	Sevilla	2–5	1–5
Racing de Santander	3–1	Ensidesa	2–1	1–0
Toscal	0–7	Las Palmas	0–5	0–2
Portuense	1–2	Cádiz	1–1	0–1
Balmaseda	4–2	Real Unión	2–0	2–2
Puerto Real	1–2	Recreativo de Huelva	1–1	0–1
Almansa	3–4	Albacete	3–1	0–3
Las Palmas Atlético	2–3	Tenerife	1–0	1–3
Leganés	2–3	Rayo Vallecano	2–0	0–3
Sabiñánigo	0–6	Zaragoza	0–0	0–6
Almazán	1–7	Salamanca	0–4	1–3
Arosa	3–4	Racing de Ferrol	2–1	1–3
Deportivo de La Coruña	4–3	Pontevedra	3–1	1–2
Arenas Guecho	0–8	Baracaldo	0–3	0–5
Masnou	2–5	Terrassa	2–2	0–3
Torrevieja	1–2	Elche	1–0	0–2
Murcia	2–1	Vinaroz	2–0	0–1
Villanovense	2–8	Getafe	2–3	0–5
Valladolid	5–0	Palencia	4–0	1–0
Cultural Leonesa	3–1	Gijón Industrial	2–0	1–1
Caudal	3–3 (2–4 p)	Fabril	3–1	0–2
Moscardó	1–3	San Fernando Henares	1–0	0–3
Júpiter	1–2	Nàstic Tarragona	1–2	0–0
Zamora	3–3 (7–6 p)	Calahorra	2–0	1–3
Celanova	1–8	Celta Turista	1–3	0–5
Reus	3–4	Poblense	2–0	1–4
Hospitalet	4–7	Olot	1–1	3–6
Burgos Promesas	0–4	Venta de Baños	0–0	0–4

Bye: Valladolid Promesas

== Second round ==
Team 1	Agg.	Team 2	1st leg	2nd leg
Almería	3–1	San Fernando	1–0	2–1
Real Murcia	2–1	Levante	1–0	1–1
Cultural Leonesa	1–3	Racing Santander	1–0	0–3
Jaén	2–1	Úbeda	1–0	1–1
Málaga	5–0	Mérida	3–0	2–0
Real Sociedad	5–1	Sestao	4–1	1–0
Pegaso	2–3	Atlético Madrid	0–1	2–2
Terrassa	1–1 (2–3 p)	Poblense	0–1	1–0
Elche	3–1	Villarreal	3–1	0–0
Andorra	3–8	Español	2–5	1–3
Zaragoza	2–1	Huesca	1–1	1–0
Albacete	1–2	Hércules	1–0	0–2
Acero	2–4	Crevillente	1–2	1–2
Tenerife	1–2	Las Palmas	1–0	0–2
Rayo Vallecano	6–2	Talavera	4–0	2–2
Sevilla	5–1	Díter Zafra	4–1	1–0
Celta Turista	0–3	Celta	0–0	0–3
Lleida	1–0	Olot	0–0	1–0
Cádiz	5–1	Jerez Industrial	5–0	0–1
Recreativo de Huelva	2–4	Ceuta	2–1	0–3
Xerez	1–5	Betis	1–1	0–4
Granada	0–1	Córdoba	0–1	0–0
Gandía	3–5	Nàstic Tarragona	3–2	0–3
Castilla	7–0	Carabanchel	1–0	6–0
Venta de Baños	2–10	Salamanca	0–3	2–7
Santoña	2–4	Oviedo	2–1	0–3
Lugo	2–2 (2–5 p)	Deportivo de La Coruña	1–0	1–2
Basconia	2–5	Osasuna	0–1	2–4
Turón	0–8	Fabril	0–2	0–6
Alavés	4–1	Erandio	4–0	0–1
Sant Andreu	3–5	Girona	1–4	2–1
Balmaseda	1–11	Athletic Bilbao	0–3	1–8
Orense	2–4	Racing Ferrol	2–2	0–2
Español Raspeig	0–8	Cartagena	0–1	0–7
Getafe	4–2	Torrejón	3–0	1–2
Baracaldo	2–1	Bilbao Athletic	1–0	1–1
Zamora	4–2	Logroñés	2–0	2–2
Burgos	5–0	Valladolid Promesas	4–0	1–0

Bye: Valladolid

== Third round ==
Team 1	Agg.	Team 2	1st leg	2nd leg
Atlético Madrid	3–3 (1–4 p)	Real Madrid	1–1	2–2
Baracaldo	1–2	Ceuta	1–0	0–2
Almería	4–3	Cartagena	1–1	3–2
Betis	1–2	Las Palmas	0–0	1–2
Cádiz	3–2	Sporting Gijón	1–0	2–2
Castilla	4–6	Murcia	4–2	0–4
Celta	4–3	Hércules	2–0	2–3
Córdoba	3–7	Sevilla	1–2	2–5
Crevillente	1–2	Rayo Vallecano	0–0	1–2
Deportivo de La Coruña	2–2 (1–4 p)	Athletic Bilbao	2–2	0–0
Girona	1–3	Valencia	0–2	1–1
Elche	2–2 (5–4 p)	Poblense	1–0	1–2
Fabril	1–7	Salamanca	1–3	0–4
Jaén	2–3	Osasuna	1–1	1–2
Lleida	1–4	Real Sociedad	0–1	1–3
Málaga	1–0	Racing Ferrol	0–0	1–0
Oviedo	0–1	Alavés	0–0	0–1
Racing Santander	4–2	Zamora	3–0	1–2
Nàstic Tarragona	0–2	Burgos	0–1	0–1
Valladolid	3–2	Español	1–1	2–1
Zaragoza	5–1	Getafe	4–1	1–0

== Fourth round ==
Team 1	Agg.	Team 2	1st leg	2nd leg
Real Madrid	5–3	Las Palmas	4–2	1–1
Málaga	3–5	Valladolid	2–1	1–4
Osasuna	2–2 (3–2 p)	Almería	2–1	0–1
Real Sociedad	2–4	Valencia	1–0	1–4
Racing Santander	2–1	Ceuta	0–1	2–0
Zaragoza	6–5	Cádiz	5–2	1–3

Bye: Murcia, Celta, Sevilla, Rayo Vallecano, Athletic Bilbao, Elche, Salamanca, Alavés and Burgos.

== Round of 16 ==
Team 1	Agg.	Team 2	1st leg	2nd leg
Athletic Bilbao	2–3	Zaragoza	2–2	0–1
Barcelona	4–5	Valencia	4–1	0–4
Celta	1–5	Real Madrid	1–1	0–4
Murcia	1–2	Alavés	1–0	0–2
Osasuna	3–1	Elche	3–0	0–1
Rayo Vallecano	0–2	Racing de Santander	0–0	0–2
Salamanca	1–2	Sevilla	1–0	0–2
Valladolid	4–4 (4–1 p)	Burgos	2–2	2–2

== Quarter-finals ==
Team 1	Agg.	Team 2	1st leg	2nd leg
Alavés	0–4	Valencia	0–1	0–3
Real Madrid	2–1	Zaragoza	2–0	0–1
Sevilla	4–1	Racing Santander	2–1	2–0
Valladolid	4–2	Osasuna	2–0	2–2

== Semi-finals ==
Team 1	Agg.	Team 2	1st leg	2nd leg
Sevilla	1–2	Real Madrid	0–0	1–2
Valencia	3–2	Valladolid	2–0	1–2

== Final ==
Team 1	Score	Team 2
Valencia	2–0	Real Madrid

Copa del Rey
winners
Valencia
5th title
