= List of UEFA Super Cup matches =

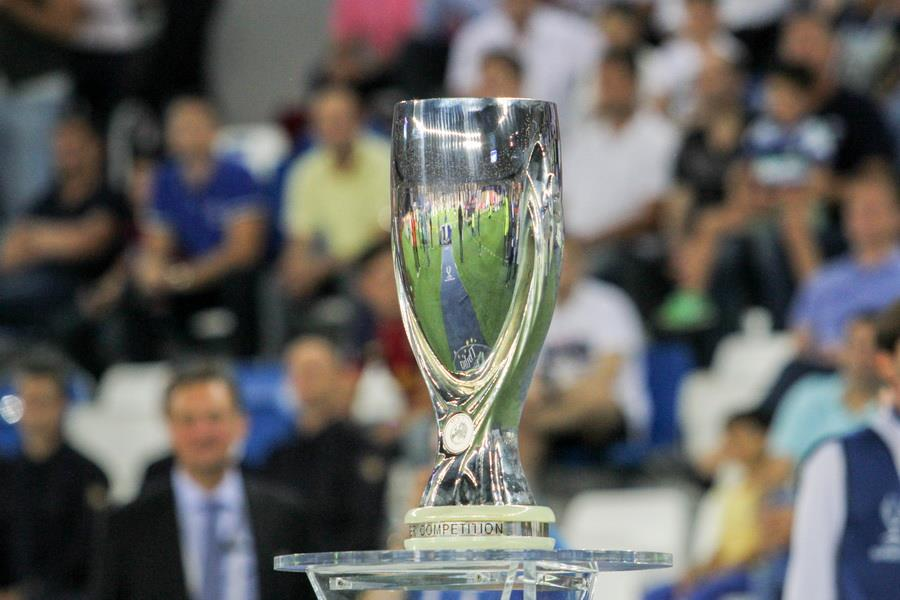
- The UEFA Super Cup trophy used since 2006
- Founded: 1972; 54 years ago (official since 1973)
- Region: Europe (UEFA)
- Teams: 2
- Current champions: (France) Paris Saint-Germain (2nd title)
- Most championships: (Spain) Real Madrid (6 titles)
- 2026 UEFA Super Cup

The UEFA Super Cup is an annual association football match contested between the winners of the UEFA Champions League and the UEFA Europa League. Established in 1972, it was contested between the winners of the European Cup (renamed the UEFA Champions League in 1993) and the European/UEFA Cup Winners' Cup until 1999, when the latter was discontinued and merged with the UEFA Cup (renamed the Europa League in 2009) by UEFA. The last Super Cup contested in this format was the 1999 UEFA Super Cup between Lazio and Manchester United, which Lazio won 1–0. The competition was originally played over two legs, one at each participating club's stadium in the winter months, but since the 1998 edition, it consists of a single match played at a neutral venue in August. Between 1998 and 2012, the Stade Louis II in Monaco hosted the Super Cup, but since 2013, it has taken place every year at a different stadium across Europe.

Real Madrid hold the record for the most victories, having won the competition six times since its inception. Paris Saint-Germain are the current title holders, having beaten Aston Villa 2–1 in the 2026 edition.

== Winners ==
Key
Winner won after extra time, golden goal or penalty shoot-out
Winner of European Cup / UEFA Champions League
Winner of European / UEFA Cup Winners' Cup
Winner of UEFA Cup / Europa League

- The two-legged finals are listed in the order they were played.

UEFA Super Cup matches
Year	Country	Winner	Score	Runner-up	Country	Venue	Attendance
1973 (Note: Took place in January 1974 rather than at the start of the season, as it has been thereafter.)	Netherlands	Ajax	0–1	Milan	Italy	San Siro, Milan, Italy	15,000
1973	Netherlands	Ajax	6–0	Milan	Italy	Olympic Stadium, Amsterdam, Netherlands	25,000
1973	Ajax won 6–1 on aggregate.						
1974 (Note: Competition was abandoned because Bayern Munich and 1. FC Magdeburg could not find a mutually convenient date for the match.)	Not held						
1975	Soviet Union	Dynamo Kyiv	1–0	Bayern Munich	West Germany	Olympiastadion, Munich, West Germany	30,000
1975	Soviet Union	Dynamo Kyiv	2–0	Bayern Munich	West Germany	Central Stadium, Kyiv, Soviet Union	110,000
1975	Dynamo Kyiv won 3–0 on aggregate.						
1976	Belgium	Anderlecht	1–2	Bayern Munich	West Germany	Olympiastadion, Munich, West Germany	40,000
1976	Belgium	Anderlecht	4–1	Bayern Munich	West Germany	Parc Astrid, Anderlecht, Belgium	32,000
1976	Anderlecht won 5–3 on aggregate.						
1977	England	Liverpool	1–1	Hamburger SV	West Germany	Volksparkstadion, Hamburg, West Germany	16,000
1977	England	Liverpool	6–0	Hamburger SV	West Germany	Anfield, Liverpool, England	34,931
1977	Liverpool won 7–1 on aggregate.						
1978	Belgium	Anderlecht	3–1	Liverpool	England	Parc Astrid, Anderlecht, Belgium	35,000
1978	Belgium	Anderlecht	1–2	Liverpool	England	Anfield, Liverpool, England	23,598
1978	Anderlecht won 4–3 on aggregate.						
1979	England	Nottingham Forest	1–0	Barcelona	Spain	City Ground, Nottingham, England	23,807
1979	England	Nottingham Forest	1–1	Barcelona	Spain	Camp Nou, Barcelona, Spain	80,000
1979	Nottingham Forest won 2–1 on aggregate.						
1980	Spain	Valencia	1–2	Nottingham Forest	England	City Ground, Nottingham, England	12,463
1980	Spain	Valencia	1–0	Nottingham Forest	England	Estadio Luis Casanova, Valencia, Spain	29,038
1980	2–2 on aggregate; Valencia won on the away goals rule.						
1981 (Note: Competition was not played because Liverpool could not find a suitable date to play Dinamo Tbilisi due to fixture congestion.)	Not held						
1982	England	Aston Villa	0–1	Barcelona	Spain	Camp Nou, Barcelona, Spain	40,000
1982	England	Aston Villa	3–0 (a.e.t.)	Barcelona	Spain	Villa Park, Birmingham, England	31,750
1982	Aston Villa won 3–1 on aggregate.						
1983	Scotland	Aberdeen	0–0	Hamburger SV	West Germany	Volksparkstadion, Hamburg, West Germany	15,000
1983	Scotland	Aberdeen	2–0	Hamburger SV	West Germany	Pittodrie, Aberdeen, Scotland	22,500
1983	Aberdeen won 2–0 on aggregate.						
1984 (Note: One match was played in 1984 by agreement between Liverpool and Juventus managers due to both clubs experiencing fixture congestion.)	Italy	Juventus	2–0	Liverpool	England	Stadio Comunale, Turin, Italy	55,834
1985 (Note: Competition was abandoned as Everton could not play, due to a ban on English clubs' participation in European football competitions.)	Not held						
1986 (Note: Due to political circumstances, Steaua București and Dynamo Kyiv agreed to contest the 1986 competition on a one-off basis.)	Romania	Steaua București	1–0	Dynamo Kyiv	Soviet Union	Stade Louis II, Monaco	8,456
1987	Portugal	Porto	1–0	Ajax	Netherlands	Olympic Stadium, Amsterdam, Netherlands	27,000
1987	Portugal	Porto	1–0	Ajax	Netherlands	Estádio das Antas, Porto, Portugal	50,000
1987	Porto won 2–0 on aggregate.						
1988	Belgium	KV Mechelen	3–0	PSV Eindhoven	Netherlands	Achter de Kazerne, Mechelen, Belgium	7,000
1988	Belgium	KV Mechelen	0–1	PSV Eindhoven	Netherlands	Philips Stadion, Eindhoven, Netherlands	17,100
1988	Mechelen won 3–1 on aggregate.						
1989	Italy	Milan	1–1	Barcelona	Spain	Camp Nou, Barcelona, Spain	50,000
1989	Italy	Milan	1–0	Barcelona	Spain	San Siro, Milan, Italy	50,000
1989	Milan won 2–1 on aggregate.						
1990	Italy	Milan	1–1	Sampdoria	Italy	Stadio Luigi Ferraris, Genoa, Italy	25,000
1990	Italy	Milan	2–0	Sampdoria	Italy	Stadio Renato Dall'Ara, Bologna, Italy	25,000
1990	Milan won 3–1 on aggregate.						
1991 (Note: One match was played in 1991 due to political circumstances in Yugoslavia.)	England	Manchester United	1–0	Red Star Belgrade	Yugoslavia	Old Trafford, Manchester, England	22,110
1992	Spain	Barcelona	1–1	Werder Bremen	Germany	Weserstadion, Bremen, Germany	22,098
1992	Spain	Barcelona	2–1	Werder Bremen	Germany	Camp Nou, Barcelona, Spain	75,000
1992	Barcelona won 3–2 on aggregate.						
1993	Italy	Parma	0–1	Milan (Note: European champions Marseille were suspended due to a bribery scandal, so Milan took their place as runner-up in the European Cup.)	Italy	Stadio Ennio Tardini, Parma, Italy	8,083
1993	Italy	Parma	2–0 (a.e.t.)	Milan	Italy	San Siro, Milan, Italy	24,074
1993	Parma won 2–1 on aggregate.						
1994	Italy	Milan	0–0	Arsenal	England	Highbury, London, England	38,044
1994	Italy	Milan	2–0	Arsenal	England	San Siro, Milan, Italy	23,953
1994	Milan won 2–0 on aggregate.						
1995	Netherlands	Ajax	1–1	Zaragoza	Spain	La Romareda, Zaragoza, Spain	17,500
1995	Netherlands	Ajax	4–0	Zaragoza	Spain	Olympic Stadium, Amsterdam, Netherlands	23,000
1995	Ajax won 5–1 on aggregate.						
1996	Italy	Juventus	6–1	Paris Saint-Germain	France	Parc des Princes, Paris, France	29,519
1996	Italy	Juventus	3–1	Paris Saint-Germain	France	Stadio La Favorita, Palermo, Italy	35,100
1996	Juventus won 9–2 on aggregate.						
1997	Spain	Barcelona	2–0	Borussia Dortmund	Germany	Camp Nou, Barcelona, Spain	50,000
1997	Spain	Barcelona	1–1	Borussia Dortmund	Germany	Westfalenstadion, Dortmund, Germany	32,500
1997	Barcelona won 3–1 on aggregate.						
1998	England	Chelsea	1–0	Real Madrid	Spain	Stade Louis II, Monaco	10,000
1999	Italy	Lazio	1–0	Manchester United	England	Stade Louis II, Monaco	12,000
2000	Turkey	Galatasaray	2–1 (g.g.)	Real Madrid	Spain	Stade Louis II, Monaco	15,000
2001	England	Liverpool	3–2	Bayern Munich	Germany	Stade Louis II, Monaco	13,824
2002	Spain	Real Madrid	3–1	Feyenoord	Netherlands	Stade Louis II, Monaco	18,284
2003	Italy	Milan	1–0	Porto	Portugal	Stade Louis II, Monaco	16,885
2004	Spain	Valencia	2–1	Porto	Portugal	Stade Louis II, Monaco	17,292
2005	England	Liverpool	3–1 (a.e.t.)	CSKA Moscow	Russia	Stade Louis II, Monaco	17,042
2006	Spain	Sevilla	3–0	Barcelona	Spain	Stade Louis II, Monaco	17,480
2007	Italy	Milan	3–1	Sevilla	Spain	Stade Louis II, Monaco	17,822
2008	Russia	Zenit Saint Petersburg	2–1	Manchester United	England	Stade Louis II, Monaco	18,064
2009	Spain	Barcelona	1–0 (a.e.t.)	Shakhtar Donetsk	Ukraine	Stade Louis II, Monaco	17,738
2010	Spain	Atlético Madrid	2–0	Inter Milan	Italy	Stade Louis II, Monaco	17,265
2011	Spain	Barcelona	2–0	Porto	Portugal	Stade Louis II, Monaco	18,048
2012	Spain	Atlético Madrid	4–1	Chelsea	England	Stade Louis II, Monaco	14,312
2013	Germany	Bayern Munich	2–2 (a.e.t.) (Note: Score was 1–1 after 90 minutes and 2–2 after extra time. Bayern Munich won the penalty shoot-out 5–4.)	Chelsea	England	Eden Aréna, Prague, Czech Republic	17,686
2014	Spain	Real Madrid	2–0	Sevilla	Spain	Cardiff City Stadium, Cardiff, Wales	30,854
2015	Spain	Barcelona	5–4 (a.e.t.)	Sevilla	Spain	Boris Paichadze Dinamo Arena, Tbilisi, Georgia	51,940
2016	Spain	Real Madrid	3–2 (a.e.t.)	Sevilla	Spain	Lerkendal Stadion, Trondheim, Norway	17,939
2017	Spain	Real Madrid	2–1	Manchester United	England	Philip II Arena, Skopje, Macedonia	30,421
2018	Spain	Atlético Madrid	4–2 (a.e.t.)	Real Madrid	Spain	A. Le Coq Arena, Tallinn, Estonia	12,424
2019	England	Liverpool	2–2 (a.e.t.) (Note: Score was 1–1 after 90 minutes and 2–2 after extra time. Liverpool won the penalty shoot-out 5–4.)	Chelsea	England	Vodafone Park, Istanbul, Turkey	38,434
2020	Germany	Bayern Munich	2–1 (a.e.t.)	Sevilla	Spain	Puskás Aréna, Budapest, Hungary	15,180 (Note: The 2020 and 2021 editions were played with limited capacity due to the COVID-19 pandemic in Europe.)
2021	England	Chelsea	1–1 (a.e.t.) (Note: Score was 1–1 after 90 minutes and extra time. Chelsea won the penalty shoot-out 6–5.)	Villarreal	Spain	Windsor Park, Belfast, Northern Ireland	10,435
2022	Spain	Real Madrid	2–0	Eintracht Frankfurt	Germany	Olympic Stadium, Helsinki, Finland	31,042
2023	England	Manchester City	1–1 (Note: Score was 1–1 after 90 minutes. Manchester City won the penalty shoot-out 5–4.)	Sevilla	Spain	Karaiskakis Stadium, Athens, Greece	29,207
2024	Spain	Real Madrid	2–0	Atalanta	Italy	Stadion Narodowy, Warsaw, Poland	56,042
2025	France	Paris Saint-Germain	2–2 (Note: Score was 2–2 after 90 minutes. Paris Saint-Germain won the penalty shoot-out 4–3.)	Tottenham Hotspur	England	Stadio Friuli, Udine, Italy	21,025
2026	France	Paris Saint-Germain	2–1	Aston Villa	England	Red Bull Arena, Salzburg, Austria	27,681

== Performances ==
=== By club ===
Performance in the UEFA Super Cup by club
Club	Winners	Runners-up	Years won (Note: No competitions were held in 1974, 1981 and 1985.)	Years runners-up
(Spain) Real Madrid	6	3	2002, 2014, 2016, 2017, 2022, 2024	1998, 2000, 2018
(Spain) Barcelona	5	4	1992, 1997, 2009, 2011, 2015	1979, 1982, 1989, 2006
(Italy) Milan	5	2	1989, 1990, 1994, 2003, 2007	1973, 1993
(England) Liverpool	4	2	1977, 2001, 2005, 2019	1978, 1984
(Spain) Atlético Madrid	3	0	2010, 2012, 2018	—
(England) Chelsea	2	3	1998, 2021	2012, 2013, 2019
(Germany) Bayern Munich	2	3	2013, 2020	1975, 1976, 2001
(Netherlands) Ajax (Note: Excludes the 1972 European Super Cup, not organised nor recognised by UEFA as an official title.)	2	1	1973, 1995	1987
(France) Paris Saint-Germain	2	1	2025, 2026	1996
(Belgium) Anderlecht	2	0	1976, 1978	—
(Spain) Valencia	2	0	1980, 2004	—
(Italy) Juventus	2	0	1984, 1996	—
(Spain) Sevilla	1	6	2006	2007, 2014, 2015, 2016, 2020, 2023
(Portugal) Porto	1	3	1987	2003, 2004, 2011
(England) Manchester United	1	3	1991	1999, 2008, 2017
(Soviet Union) Dynamo Kyiv	1	1	1975	1986
(England) Nottingham Forest	1	1	1979	1980
(England) Aston Villa	1	1	1982	2026
(Scotland) Aberdeen	1	0	1983	—
(Romania) Steaua București	1	0	1986	—
(Belgium) KV Mechelen	1	0	1988	—
(Italy) Parma	1	0	1993	—
(Italy) Lazio	1	0	1999	—
(Turkey) Galatasaray	1	0	2000	—
(Russia) Zenit Saint Petersburg	1	0	2008	—
(England) Manchester City	1	0	2023	—
(Germany) Hamburger SV	0	2	—	1977, 1983
(Netherlands) PSV Eindhoven	0	1	—	1988
(Italy) Sampdoria	0	1	—	1990
(Socialist Federal Republic of Yugoslavia) Red Star Belgrade	0	1	—	1991
(Germany) Werder Bremen	0	1	—	1992
(England) Arsenal	0	1	—	1994
(Spain) Zaragoza	0	1	—	1995
(Germany) Borussia Dortmund	0	1	—	1997
(Netherlands) Feyenoord	0	1	—	2002
(Russia) CSKA Moscow	0	1	—	2005
(Ukraine) Shakhtar Donetsk	0	1	—	2009
(Italy) Inter Milan	0	1	—	2010
(Spain) Villarreal	0	1	—	2021
(Germany) Eintracht Frankfurt	0	1	—	2022
(Italy) Atalanta	0	1	—	2024
(England) Tottenham Hotspur	0	1	—	2025

=== By nation ===
Performance by nation
Nation	Winners	Runners-up	Total
Spain	17	15	32
England	10	12	22
Italy	9	5	14
Belgium	3	0	3
Germany (Note: Includes clubs representing West Germany. No clubs representing East Germany appeared in a match.)	2	8	10
Netherlands	2	3	5
France	2	1	3
Portugal	1	3	4
Russia	1	1	2
Soviet Union (Note: Both Soviet appearances were made by a Ukrainian SSR club.)	1	1	2
Romania	1	0	1
Scotland	1	0	1
Turkey	1	0	1
Ukraine	0	1	1
Yugoslavia (Note: The Yugoslav appearance was made by a club from SR Serbia.)	0	1	1

=== By method of qualification ===
UEFA Super Cup winners by method of qualification
Cup	Winners	Runners-up
UEFA Champions League (Note: Known as the European Cup from 1956 to 1992.)	31	20
UEFA Cup Winners' Cup (Note: Discontinued and merged into the UEFA Cup in 1999, past winners are kept separate.)	12	12
UEFA Europa League (Note: Known as the UEFA Cup from 1971 to 2009.)	8	19

== See also ==
- List of European Cup and UEFA Champions League finals
- List of UEFA Cup and Europa League finals
- List of UEFA Super Cup winning managers
- List of UEFA Cup Winners' Cup finals
