= 2013 UEFA Super Cup =

- Match programme cover
Bayern Munich	Chelsea
(Germany)	(England)
2	2
- After extra time Bayern Munich won 5–4 on penalties
- Date: 30 August 2013
- Venue: Fortuna Arena, Prague
- Man of the Match: Franck Ribéry (Bayern Munich)
- Referee: Jonas Eriksson (Sweden)
- Attendance: 17,686
- Weather: Clear night 19 °C (66 °F); 58% humidity

The 2013 UEFA Super Cup was the 38th UEFA Super Cup, an annual football match organised by UEFA and contested by the reigning champions of the two main European club competitions, the UEFA Champions League and the UEFA Europa League. In a repeat of the 2012 UEFA Champions League Final, the match featured Bayern Munich, the winners of the 2012–13 UEFA Champions League, and Chelsea, the winners of the 2012–13 UEFA Europa League. Having beaten Bayern in the 2012 Champions League Final, it was Chelsea's second consecutive appearance in the Super Cup. It was played at the Fortuna Arena in Prague, Czech Republic, on 30 August 2013, and was the first to be held away from the Stade Louis II in Monaco since it became a one-legged match in 1998.

Bayern Munich became the first German team to win the UEFA Super Cup, beating Chelsea on penalties after extra time. It was also the first time the winner of the Super Cup was determined by a penalty shoot-out. Chelsea's defeat made them the first team to lose consecutive Super Cups since Porto in 2004.

== Venue ==
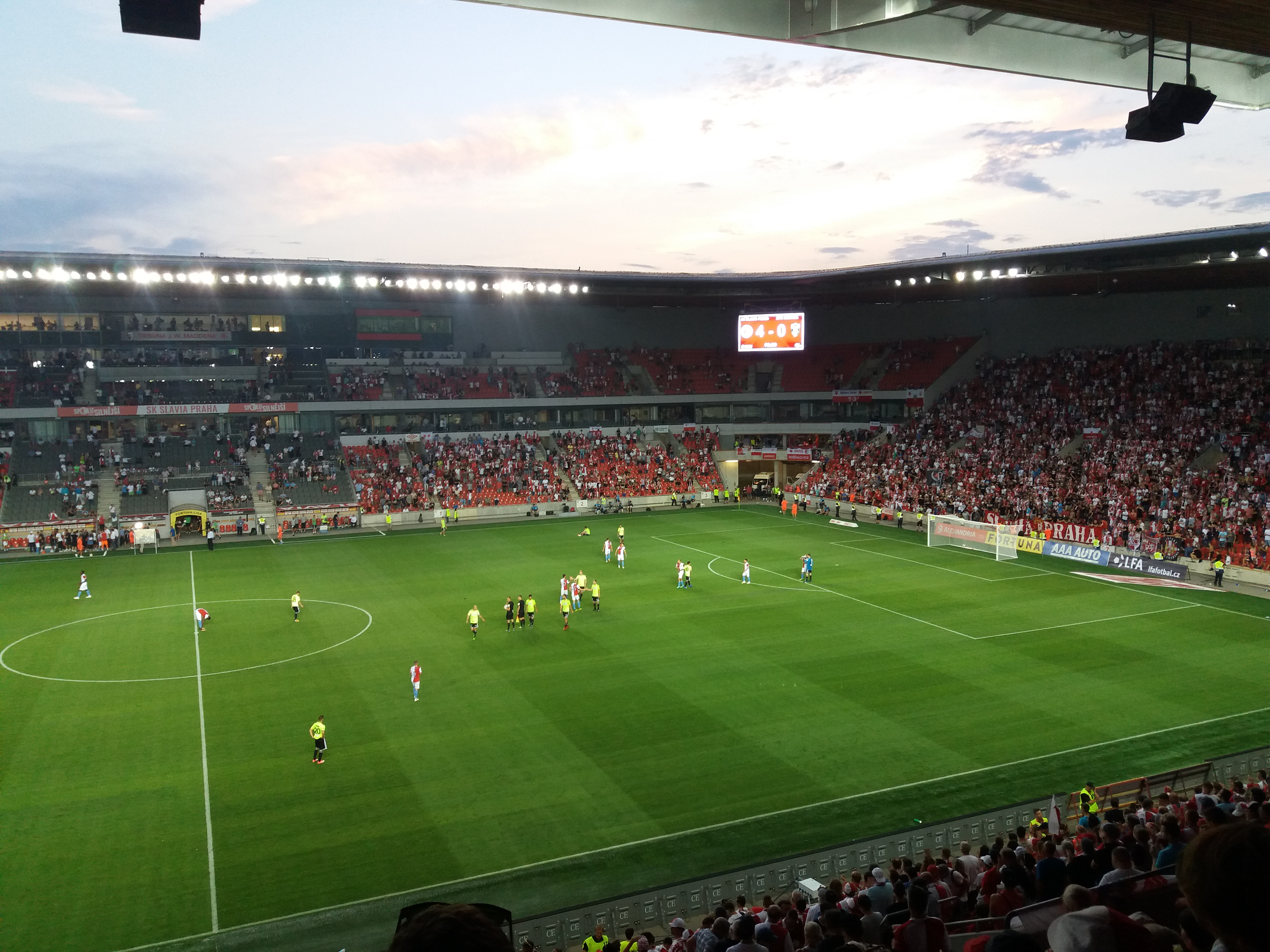
The Eden Arena.

The Eden Arena was announced as the venue of the 2013 UEFA Super Cup on 16 June 2011. It opened in May 2008 on the site of the former Stadion Eden. It is the home stadium of SK Slavia Prague, who play in the Czech First League.

== Teams ==
Team	Qualification	Previous participation (bold indicates winners)
(Germany) Bayern Munich	Winners of the 2012–13 UEFA Champions League	1975, 1976, 2001
(England) Chelsea	Winners of the 2012–13 UEFA Europa League	**1998**, 2012

== Background ==
The match marked the first ever UEFA Super Cup between a pair of consecutive UEFA Champions League winners—Chelsea won the 2011–12 UEFA Champions League, coincidentally defeating Bayern Munich in the final.

The match was the first and, as of 2025, only time since 2004 that both finalists competed without the managers who won their respective UEFA trophies in the previous season, as both Jupp Heynckes and Rafael Benítez left the clubs after the conclusion of the previous season. As such, this was also the last Super Cup to be won by a new manager replacing the European winning one. The new managers, Pep Guardiola and José Mourinho, renewed a rivalry they shared in Spain as managers of Barcelona and Real Madrid respectively. Guardiola had twice won the trophy in his management career, with Barcelona in 2009 and 2011. Mourinho had competed for the trophy only once in 2003 when his Porto entered as UEFA Cup holders and were defeated by Milan. Since then Mourinho had twice won the Champions League but on each occasion left his club immediately afterwards and therefore did not lead them in to the Super Cup. He would repeat this exact feat with Manchester United, losing the 2017 UEFA Super Cup having entered as UEFA Europa League holders.

== Ticketing ==
The international ticket sales phase for the general public ran from 14 June to 5 July 2013. Tickets were available in three price categories: €130, €90, and €50. UEFA also launched a charity ticket auction, with all proceeds going to the Centre for Access to Football in Europe. The two clubs were allocated tickets where fans could apply.

== Match ==
=== Details ===
30 August 2013
20:45 CEST

Bayern Munich (Germany)	2–2 (a.e.t.)	(England) Chelsea
Ribéry 47'; Martínez 120+1'	Report	Torres 8'; Hazard 93'
Penalties
Alaba (penalty scored); Kroos (penalty scored); Lahm (penalty scored); Ribéry (penalty scored); Shaqiri (penalty scored)	5–4	(penalty scored) David Luiz; (penalty scored) Oscar; (penalty scored) Lampard; (penalty scored) Cole; (penalty missed) Lukaku

Eden Arena, Prague
Attendance: 17,686
Referee: Jonas Eriksson (Sweden)

**Bayern Munich**	**Chelsea**

GK	1	(Germany) Manuel Neuer
RB	13	(Brazil) Rafinha		(substituted off) 56'
CB	17	(Germany) Jérôme Boateng	(yellow card) 84'
CB	4	(Brazil) Dante
LB	27	(Austria) David Alaba
DM	21	(Germany) Philipp Lahm (c)
RM	10	(Netherlands) Arjen Robben		(substituted off) 96'
CM	25	(Germany) Thomas Müller		(substituted off) 71'
CM	39	(Germany) Toni Kroos
LM	7	(France) Franck Ribéry	(yellow card) 23'
CF	9	(Croatia) Mario Mandžukić
Substitutes:
GK	22	(Germany) Tom Starke
DF	5	(Belgium) Daniel Van Buyten
DF	26	(Germany) Diego Contento
MF	8	(Spain) Javi Martínez		(substituted on) 56'
MF	19	(Germany) Mario Götze		(substituted on) 71'
MF	11	(Switzerland) Xherdan Shaqiri		(substituted on) 96'
FW	14	(Peru) Claudio Pizarro
Manager:
(Spain) Pep Guardiola

GK	1	(Czech Republic) Petr Čech
RB	2	(Serbia) Branislav Ivanović	(yellow card) 120'
CB	24	(England) Gary Cahill	(yellow card) 41'
CB	4	(Brazil) David Luiz	(yellow card) 66'
LB	3	(England) Ashley Cole	(yellow card) 118'
CM	7	(Brazil) Ramires	(yellow card) 64' (yellow-red card) 85'
CM	8	(England) Frank Lampard (c)
RW	14	(Germany) André Schürrle		(substituted off) 87'
AM	11	(Brazil) Oscar
LW	17	(Belgium) Eden Hazard		(substituted off) 113'
CF	9	(Spain) Fernando Torres	(yellow card) 90'	(substituted off) 98'
Substitutes:
GK	23	(Australia) Mark Schwarzer
DF	26	(England) John Terry		(substituted on) 113'
DF	28	(Spain) César Azpilicueta
MF	5	(Ghana) Michael Essien
MF	12	(Nigeria) Mikel John Obi		(substituted on) 87'
MF	10	(Spain) Juan Mata
FW	18	(Belgium) Romelu Lukaku	(yellow card) 99'	(substituted on) 98'
Manager:
(Portugal) José Mourinho

Man of the Match:
Franck Ribéry (Bayern Munich)

Assistant referees:
Mathias Klasenius (Sweden)
Daniel Wärnmark (Sweden)
Fourth official:
Stefan Wittberg (Sweden)
Additional assistant referees:
Stefan Johannesson (Sweden)
Markus Strömbergsson (Sweden)

**Match rules**

- 90 minutes.
- 30 minutes of extra time if necessary.
- Penalty shoot-out if scores still level.
- Seven named substitutes.
- Maximum of three substitutions.

=== Statistics ===
First half
Statistic	Bayern Munich	Chelsea
Goals scored	0	1
Total shots	8	4
Shots on target	4	1
Saves	0	4
Ball possession	62%	38%
Corner kicks	2	2
Fouls committed	6	10
Offsides	1	1
Yellow cards	1	1
Red cards	0	0

Second half
Statistic	Bayern Munich	Chelsea
Goals scored	1	0
Total shots	12	9
Shots on target	6	7
Saves	7	5
Ball possession	64%	36%
Corner kicks	4	3
Fouls committed	10	10
Offsides	0	2
Yellow cards	1	4
Red cards	0	1

Extra time
Statistic	Bayern Munich	Chelsea
Goals scored	1	1
Total shots	17	1
Shots on target	9	1
Saves	0	8
Ball possession	69%	31%
Corner kicks	9	0
Fouls committed	2	3
Offsides	0	1
Yellow cards	0	3
Red cards	0	0

Overall
Statistic	Bayern Munich	Chelsea
Goals scored	2	2
Total shots	37	14
Shots on target	19	9
Saves	7	17
Ball possession	64%	36%
Corner kicks	15	5
Fouls committed	18	23
Offsides	1	4
Yellow cards	2	8
Red cards	0	1

== See also ==
- 2013–14 UEFA Champions League
- 2013–14 UEFA Europa League
- 2013–14 FC Bayern Munich season
- 2013–14 Chelsea F.C. season
- 2012 UEFA Champions League final – contested between same teams
- Chelsea F.C. in international football
- FC Bayern Munich in international football
