= FC Porto in international football =

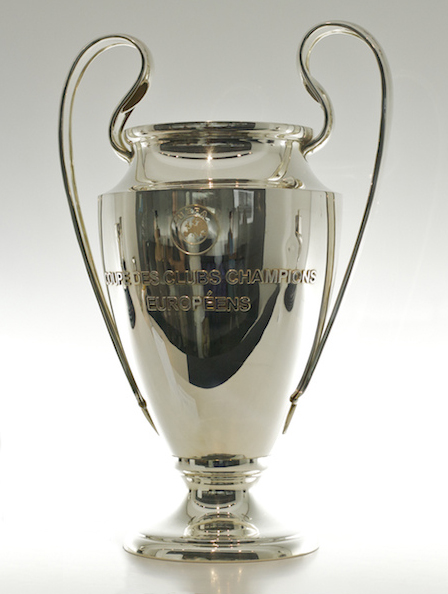
- Porto lifted the European Champion Clubs' Cup (pictured) in 1987 and 2004.
- Club: FC Porto
- Seasons played: 65
- First entry: 1956–57 European Cup
- Latest entry: 2026–27 UEFA Champions League

Titles
- Champions League: 2 (1987, 2004)
- Europa League: 2 (2003, 2011)
- Super Cup: 1 (1987)
- Intercontinental Cup: 2 (1987, 2004)

Futebol Clube do Porto, an association football team based in Porto, is the most decorated Portuguese team in international club competitions. They have won two UEFA Champions League titles (in 1987, as the European Cup, and 2004), two UEFA Europa League titles (in 2003, as the UEFA Cup, and 2011), one UEFA Super Cup (in 1987), and two Intercontinental Cups (in 1987 and 2004), for a total of seven international trophies. In addition, they were Cup Winners' Cup runners-up in 1984 – their first European final – and lost three other UEFA Super Cup matches, in 2003, 2004, and 2011.

Porto first participated in international competitions in 1956, when they qualified for the second season of the European Cup as the domestic league winners. They lost their first two European matches against Athletic Bilbao and were eliminated from the competition. Porto then debuted in the Inter-Cities Fairs Cup (not organised by UEFA) in 1962–63, in the Cup Winners' Cup in 1964–65, and in the inaugural editions of the UEFA Cup (Fairs Cup successor) and UEFA Champions League (European Cup successor) in 1971–72 and 1992–93, respectively. The club has qualified for UEFA competitions every season since 1974–75, and shares the second place in UEFA Champions League group stage appearances with Bayern Munich (24), one less than Barcelona and Real Madrid.

Until their 1986–87 European Cup success, Porto were the only of Portugal's "Big Three" teams without international silverware – Benfica had won two consecutive European Cup titles in 1961 and 1962, and Sporting CP were Cup Winners' Cup victors in 1964. As European champions, Porto contested the UEFA Super Cup and the Intercontinental Cup, lifting both trophies in their first appearance. To this date, they remain the only Portuguese team to have won either of these trophies or the UEFA Cup/UEFA Europa League. As of the 2020–21 season, Porto occupies the ninth place in the all-time European Cup and UEFA Champions League club rankings, and is the best placed Portuguese team in the UEFA club ranking.

Tomislav Ivić and José Mourinho are Porto's most decorated head coaches, each with two international titles. Former Portuguese international goalkeeper and club captain Vítor Baía holds the record for the most appearances in international competitions (99), while Colombian striker Radamel Falcao is the club's top goalscorer, with 22 goals.

== History ==
=== Early decades (1956–77) ===
Porto first participated in international club competitions in 1956, when they took part in the second edition of the European Cup. Qualification for this competition – contested between Europe's national champions – was achieved after Porto secured their fourth Primeira Divisão title in the previous season. Their debut was in a preliminary round tie against Spanish champions Atlético Bilbao. At their new home ground, the Estádio das Antas, Porto lost the first match 2–1 and were eliminated a week later in Bilbao, after a 3–2 defeat. Porto returned to this tournament two years later but fell at the same stage. After three seasons without qualifying for European competitions, Porto finished the 1961–62 league as runners-up and entered the non-UEFA-affiliated Inter-Cities Fairs Cup for the first time in 1962–63. They were knocked out in the first round by Dinamo Zagreb, who secured a draw in Yugoslavia after winning in Portugal. Porto returned to the Fairs Cup in the following season, but failed to advance past the first round.

The Cup Winners' Cup was a UEFA competition open to domestic cup winners (or losing finalists, if the winners had already qualified for the European Cup). Porto qualified for this tournament for the first time in 1964–65, after losing the 1964 Portuguese Cup final against champions Benfica. Porto progressed from the first round of a European competition for the first time, after a 4–0 aggregate victory over French Cup winners Lyon, but fell in the next round to 1860 Munich. At the end of that season, Porto finished runners-up to Benfica in the league and qualified for the following season's Fairs Cup. The club's performance was similar to that of the previous campaign: a first-round elimination of a French team (Stade Français) followed by a second-round loss to a German team (Hannover 96), which included a 5–0 away defeat that was, at the time, Porto's heaviest in Europe. They took part in the Fairs Cup in the following two seasons, but could not progress beyond the first round. In the first case, Porto were eliminated by the flip of a coin, after extra-time was not enough to break the deadlock with Bordeaux.

In 1968, the club won their third Portuguese Cup and qualified for the 1968–69 Cup Winners' Cup. As in previous years, they were unable to get past the second round, losing 4–1 on aggregate to Slovan Bratislava. Porto's last participation in the Fairs Cup, in 1969–70, also ended in the second round, with a defeat against holders Newcastle United. Domestically, Porto finished the league in an all-time low ninth place, thus failing to qualify for European competition in the 1970–71 season. They returned the following season to participate in the inaugural edition of the UEFA Cup, which officially replaced the Fairs Cup, but their debut against Nantes led to another premature exit. Porto returned to this tournament in four of the following five seasons, the exception being 1973–74, when it failed qualification for European competitions. In the first of those seasons (1972–73), Porto reached the third round of a European competition for the first time, but were eliminated by Dynamo Dresden. They beat Barcelona in the first round, in what was the teams' first European encounter and the only time Porto eliminated the Spanish side from European competitions. In the 1975–76 UEFA Cup, Porto were again eliminated in the third round, but in the process they beat Luxembourg's Avenir Beggen with a club record home (7–0) and aggregate (10–0) win scores. In the first round of the following season's UEFA Cup, Porto were matched with Schalke 04. After a tie in the first leg, Porto squandered a 2–0 lead in the second leg, conceding three goals in the last 15 minutes, which resulted in their elimination.

FC Porto fixtures in international competitions (1956–1977)
Season	Competition	Round	Opponent	Home	Away	Agg.	Ref.
1956–57	European Cup	PR	(Spain) Atlético Bilbao	1–2	2–3	3–5	
1959–60	European Cup	PR	(Czechoslovakia) Červená Hviezda Bratislava	0–2	1–2	1–4	
1962–63	Inter-Cities Fairs Cup	R1	(Socialist Federal Republic of Yugoslavia) Dinamo Zagreb	1–2	0–0	1–2	
1963–64	Inter-Cities Fairs Cup	R1	(Spain) Atlético Madrid	1–2	0–0	1–2	
1964–65	Cup Winners' Cup	R1	(France) Lyon	3–0	1–0	4–0	
1964–65	Cup Winners' Cup	R2	(West Germany) 1860 Munich	0–1	1–1	1–2	
1965–66	Inter-Cities Fairs Cup	R1	(France) Stade Français	0–0	1–0	1–0	
1965–66	Inter-Cities Fairs Cup	R2	(West Germany) Hannover 96	0–5	2–1	2–6	
1966–67	Inter-Cities Fairs Cup	R1	(France) Bordeaux	2–1	1–2	3–3 (c)	
1967–68	Inter-Cities Fairs Cup	R1	(Scotland) Hibernian	0–3	3–1	3–4	
1968–69	Cup Winners' Cup	R1	(Wales) Cardiff City	2–2	2–1	4–3	
1968–69	Cup Winners' Cup	R2	(Czechoslovakia) Slovan Bratislava	1–0	0–4	1–4	
1969–70	Inter-Cities Fairs Cup	R1	(Denmark) Hvidovre	2–0	2–1	4–1	
1969–70	Inter-Cities Fairs Cup	R2	(England) Newcastle United	0–0	0–1	0–1	
1971–72	UEFA Cup	R1	(France) Nantes	0–2	1–1	1–3	
1972–73	UEFA Cup	R1	(Spain) Barcelona	3–1	1–0	4–1	
1972–73	UEFA Cup	R2	(Belgium) Club Brugge	3–0	2–3	5–3	
1972–73	UEFA Cup	R3	(East Germany) Dynamo Dresden	1–2	0–1	1–3	
1974–75	UEFA Cup	R1	(England) Wolverhampton Wanderers	4–1	1–3	5–4	
1974–75	UEFA Cup	R2	(Italy) Napoli	0–1	0–1	0–2	
1975–76	UEFA Cup	R1	(Luxembourg) Avenir Beggen	7–0	3–0	10–0	
1975–76	UEFA Cup	R2	(Scotland) Dundee United	1–1	2–1	3–2	
1975–76	UEFA Cup	R3	(West Germany) Hamburger SV	2–1	0–2	2–3	
1976–77	UEFA Cup	R1	(West Germany) Schalke 04	2–2	2–3	4–5	
Porto goals appear first in scores.; Wins are highlighted in green, draws in yellow, and losses in red.

=== First final – Pedroto years (1977–84) ===
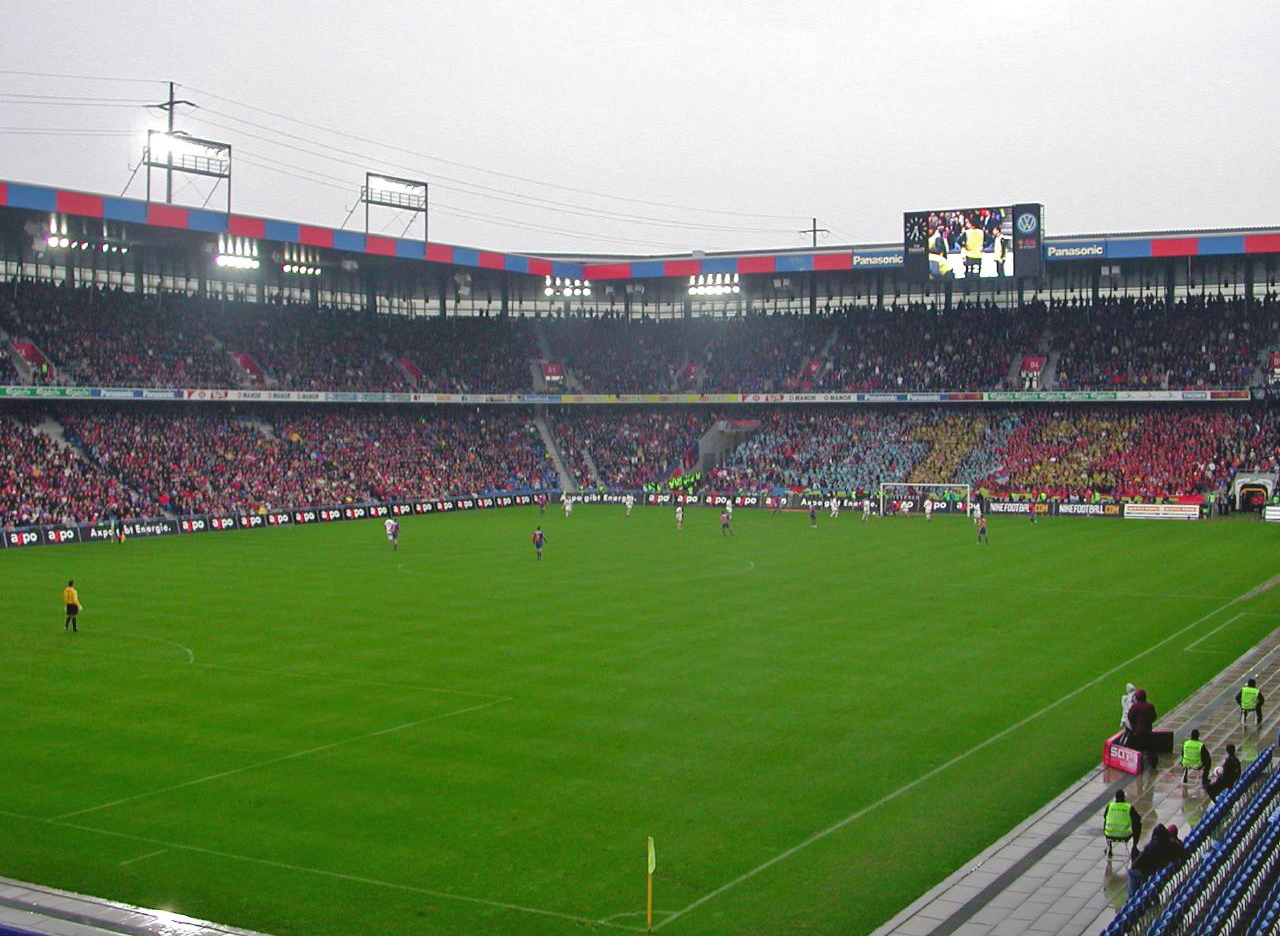
The 1984 Cup Winners' Cup final, between Juventus and Porto, was held in Basel's former St. Jakob Stadium, now replaced by the modern St. Jakob-Park (pictured).

Head coach José Maria Pedroto oversaw Porto's victory over Braga in the 1977 Portuguese Cup final, which ensured the club's participation in the 1977–78 Cup Winners' Cup. After overcoming Köln in the first round, Porto met Manchester United for the first time in international club competition. Reactions to the second round draw predicted an easy task for the English team, but Porto stunned its visitors and Europe with a 4–0 win. In Old Trafford, Manchester United pressed hard and even benefited from two own goals, but their 5–2 win was insufficient to prevent a shocking elimination at the hands of Porto. Playing in a quarter-final round for the first time, they were defeated by the eventual competition winners, Anderlecht.

Porto finished the season at the top of the Primeira Liga, ending a 19-year drought of league titles. In their return to the European Cup, they were eliminated in the first round after suffering their heaviest defeat in European competitions: 6–1 against AEK Athens. Porto secured back-to-back league titles to participate in the 1979–80 European Cup. They eliminated Milan in the first round, with a second-leg 1–0 win at San Siro, and advanced to a second-round contest with Real Madrid. Two goals from Fernando Gomes granted a 2–1 home win for Porto, but Real's goal proved crucial to secure their qualification on the away goals rule, after a 1–0 win in Madrid. Porto spent their following five seasons competing either in the UEFA Cup or Cup Winners' Cup. In the 1980–81 and 1982–83 UEFA Cup editions, Porto was eliminated in the second round by Grasshoppers and Anderlecht, respectively. In between, the club sailed into the 1981–82 Cup Winners' Cup quarter-finals, where they were beaten by the eventual runners-up Standard Liège.

Porto lost the 1983 Portuguese Cup final to league champions Benfica, which allowed their participation in the 1983–84 Cup Winners' Cup as losing cup finalists. They eliminated Dinamo Zagreb, Rangers, and Shakhtar Donetsk to reach their first European semi-final. The competition draw paired Porto with the holders Aberdeen, managed by Alex Ferguson. Taking a 1–0 lead to Pittodrie, Porto resisted to the attacking pressure of their opponents, and scored the only goal of the match. "We simply were not good enough against Porto", said Ferguson in the aftermath. This feat was met with such enthusiasm that the plane returning the team to Porto could not land because the runway had been invaded by supporters. The final against Juventus was contested at the former St. Jakob Stadium in Basel, where Portuguese supporters were a minority. The Italians were the favourites and started off well, taking the lead through Beniamino Vignola in the 13th minute. Seventeen minutes later, António Sousa equalised for Porto, but the Portuguese side could not prevent Zbigniew Boniek from scoring Juventus's winning goal just before half-time. Despite the defeat, this final was a stepping stone in the growth of the club's international reputation.

FC Porto fixtures in international competitions (1977–1984)
Season	Competition	Round	Opponent	Home	Away	Agg.	Ref.
1977–78	Cup Winners' Cup	R1	(West Germany) Köln	1–0	2–2	3–2	
1977–78	Cup Winners' Cup	R2	(England) Manchester United	4–0	2–5	6–5	
1977–78	Cup Winners' Cup	QF	(Belgium) Anderlecht	1–0	0–3	1–3	
1978–79	European Cup	R1	(Greece) AEK Athens	4–1	1–6	5–7	
1979–80	European Cup	R1	(Italy) Milan	0–0	1–0	1–0	
1979–80	European Cup	R2	(Spain) Real Madrid	2–1	0–1	2–2 (a)	
1980–81	UEFA Cup	R1	(Republic of Ireland) Dundalk	1–0	0–0	1–0	
1980–81	UEFA Cup	R2	(Switzerland) Grasshoppers	2–0	0–3 (aet)	2–3	
1981–82	Cup Winners' Cup	R1	(Denmark) Vejle	3–0	1–2	4–2	
1981–82	Cup Winners' Cup	R2	(Italy) Roma	2–0	0–0	2–0	
1981–82	Cup Winners' Cup	QF	(Belgium) Standard Liège	2–2	0–2	2–4	
1982–83	UEFA Cup	R1	(Netherlands) Utrecht	2–0	1–0	3–0	
1982–83	UEFA Cup	R2	(Belgium) Anderlecht	3–2	0–4	3–6	
1983–84	Cup Winners' Cup	R1	(Socialist Federal Republic of Yugoslavia) Dinamo Zagreb	1–0	1–2	2–2 (a)	
1983–84	Cup Winners' Cup	R2	(Scotland) Rangers	1–0	1–2	2–2 (a)	
1983–84	Cup Winners' Cup	QF	(Soviet Union) Shakhtar Donetsk	3–2	1–1	4–3	
1983–84	Cup Winners' Cup	SF	(Scotland) Aberdeen	1–0	1–0	2–0	
1983–84	Cup Winners' Cup	F	(Italy) Juventus	—N/a	—N/a	1–2	
Porto goals appear first in scores.; Wins are highlighted in green, draws in yellow, and losses in red.

=== First titles – Artur Jorge and Ivić years (1984–91) ===
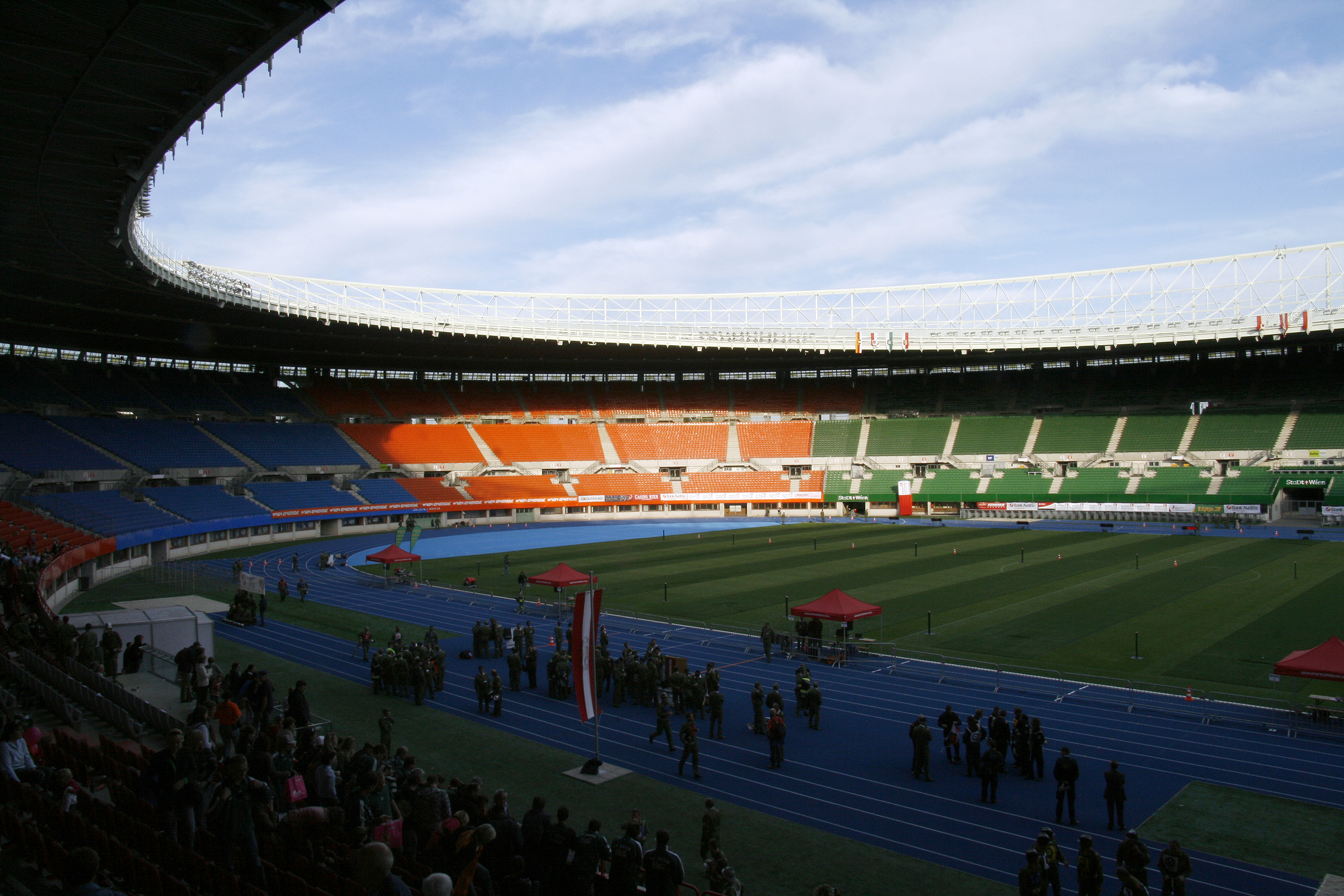
Ernst-Happel-Stadion, formerly known as Praterstadion, staged the 1987 European Cup Final won 2–1 by Porto against Bayern Munich.

Victory in the 1984 Portuguese Cup final ensured Porto's return to the Cup Winners' Cup in 1984–85, but they were surprisingly knocked out in the first round by Welsh Cup runners-up Wrexham. In January 1985, having left his job because of health problems, Pedroto died; he was succeeded by his apprentice Artur Jorge. Porto won the 1984–85 Primeira Liga and qualified for the 1985–86 European Cup, where they first beat an Ajax side guided by Johan Cruyff and featuring Ronald Koeman, Frank Rijkaard and Marco van Basten. Porto then faced Barcelona in the second round; after a 2–0 loss at Camp Nou, Juary scored all three goals of Porto's 3–1 win, which was insufficient to avoid elimination on the away goals rule.

Porto defended their league title to earn a place in the 1986–87 European Cup. They faced Malta's Rabat Ajax in the first round, but had to play their home leg away from the Estádio das Antas (in Vila do Conde), because the pitch was being lowered to increase the stadium capacity. The Maltese suffered a 9–0 defeat, which is still Porto's biggest home win for European competitions. In the second round, they played the Czechoslovak champions TJ Vítkovice; Porto lost 1–0 in Ostrava but overcame the disadvantage with a 3–0 home win. They then eliminated Brøndby of Denmark to advance to the European Cup semi-finals for the first time, where they were drawn against Dynamo Kyiv. The Soviets were considered strong favourites to progress, but Porto won both legs with a 2–1 scoreline and confirmed their second European final in four seasons.

Standing between Porto and the European title were three-time champions Bayern Munich, who knocked out Real Madrid in the other semi-final and had the odds in their favour. Moreover, Porto's centre-back Lima Pereira and striker Fernando Gomes had suffered leg injuries and were deemed unfit to play. With the final scheduled for Vienna's Praterstadion, support for the Bavarian team far outnumbered that for Porto. Bayern took the lead in the 26th minute through Ludwig Kögl and secured it until the 77th minute, when Rabah Madjer's backheel equaliser became one of the most memorable goals in European Cup finals. Three minutes later, Madjer provided the cross for Juary's match-deciding volley. This victory was celebrated in Portugal and praised by the European press, which highlighted Porto's second-half resurgence and the key contributions of Madjer, Juary and Paulo Futre in the team's success. Having witnessed their Lisbon rivals lift European trophies in the 1960s – Benfica's back-to-back European Cup wins in 1961 and 1962, and Sporting's successful Cup Winners' Cup run in 1964 – this win meant that Porto were no longer the only "Big Three" club in Portugal without international silverware.

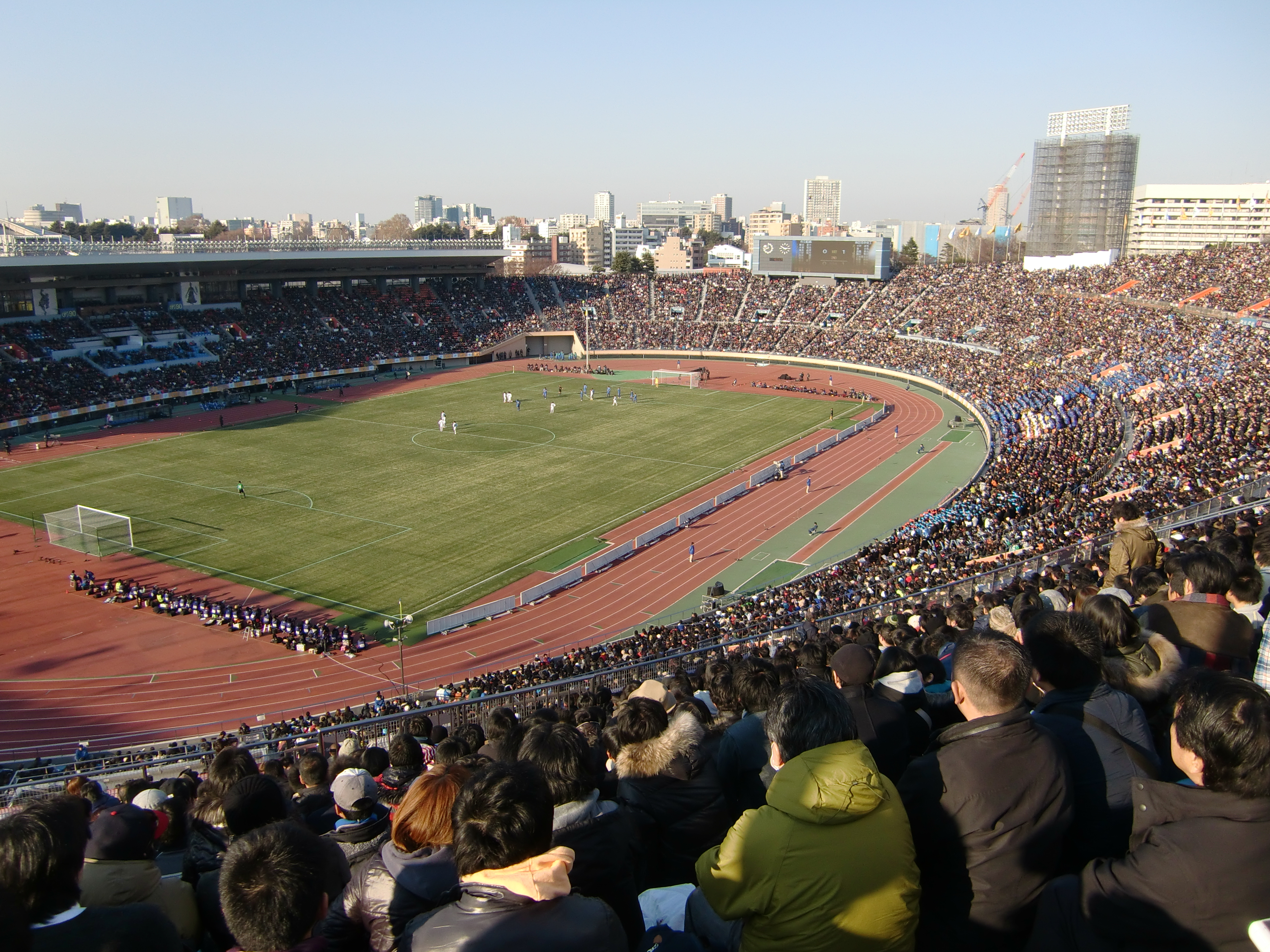
Tokyo's National Stadium hosted Porto's 1987 Intercontinental Cup 2–1 victory over Peñarol.

Soon after the final, Artur Jorge left Porto to coach French team Matra Racing; his substitute was Tomislav Ivić. As European Cup winners, Porto contested the 1987 European Super Cup against Ajax, the 1986–87 Cup Winners' Cup holders. Porto won the first leg 1–0 in Amsterdam, and two months later repeated the result at home, becoming the competition's first Portuguese winners. In between, Porto traveled to Japan to contest the 1987 Intercontinental Cup against the 1987 Copa Libertadores winners, Peñarol of Uruguay. A severe snowstorm hit Tokyo on the day of the match, which nearly forced its postponement. Despite the poor weather conditions, the game went ahead. Porto took the lead just before half-time but conceded the equaliser in the final minutes of the second half. In extra-time, Madjer lobbed a ball from the midfield over Peñarol's goalkeeper; it landed on the snow a few feet away from the goal line, but with enough momentum to roll into the goal and secure Porto's (and Portugal's) first Intercontinental Cup title.

As holders, Porto were automatically qualified for the 1987–88 European Cup, but their previous season's success was not emulated as they were eliminated in the second round by Real Madrid. Ivić departed with a league title and Artur Jorge was brought back with the 1988–89 season underway. In the 1988–89 European Cup, Porto were knocked out by the holders, PSV Eindhoven, after a heavy 5–0 away defeat. Finishing second in the 1988–89 Primeira Liga, Porto entered the UEFA Cup, seven years after their last participation. They eliminated Flacăra Moreni of Romania and Valencia, before falling in the third round to Hamburger SV. Returning to the European Cup in 1990–91, Porto began their campaign beating the Northern Irish champions Portadown (13–1 on aggregate, including an 8–1 away win, the club's biggest in European competitions) and Dinamo București (4–0). In the quarter-finals, they faced Bayern Munich for the first time since the 1987 final. After securing a 1–1 draw in Munich, Porto were beaten 2–0 at home.

FC Porto fixtures in international competitions (1984–1991)
Season	Competition	Round	Opponent	Home	Away	Agg.	Ref.
1984–85	Cup Winners' Cup	R1	(Wales) Wrexham	4–3	0–1	4–4 (a)	
1985–86	European Cup	R1	(Netherlands) Ajax	2–0	0–0	2–0	
1985–86	European Cup	R2	(Spain) Barcelona	3–1	0–2	3–3 (a)	
1986–87	European Cup	R1	(Malta) Rabat Ajax	9–0	1–0	10–0	
1986–87	European Cup	R2	(Czechoslovakia) Vítkovice	3–0	0–1	3–1	
1986–87	European Cup	QF	(Denmark) Brøndby	1–0	1–1	2–1	
1986–87	European Cup	SF	(Soviet Union) Dynamo Kyiv	2–1	2–1	4–2	
1986–87	European Cup	F	(West Germany) Bayern Munich	—N/a	—N/a	2–1	
1987	Super Cup		(Netherlands) Ajax	1–0	1–0	2–0	
1987	Intercontinental Cup		(Uruguay) Peñarol	—N/a	—N/a	2–1	
1987–88	European Cup	R1	(Socialist Federal Republic of Yugoslavia) Vardar	3–0	3–0	6–0	
1987–88	European Cup	R2	(Spain) Real Madrid	1–2	1–2	2–4	
1988–89	European Cup	R1	(Finland) HJK	3–0	0–2	3–2	
1988–89	European Cup	R2	(Netherlands) PSV Eindhoven	2–0	0–5	2–5	
1989–90	UEFA Cup	R1	(Romania) Flacăra Moreni	2–0	2–1	4–1	
1989–90	UEFA Cup	R2	(Spain) Valencia	3–1	2–3	5–4	
1989–90	UEFA Cup	R3	(West Germany) Hamburger SV	2–1	0–1	2–2 (a)	
1990–91	European Cup	R1	(Northern Ireland) Portadown	5–0	8–1	13–1	
1990–91	European Cup	R2	(Romania) Dinamo București	4–0	0–0	4–0	
1990–91	European Cup	QF	(Germany) Bayern Munich	1–1	0–2	1–3	
Porto goals appear first in scores.; Wins are highlighted in green, draws in yellow, and losses in red.

=== Champions League regular (1991–2002) ===
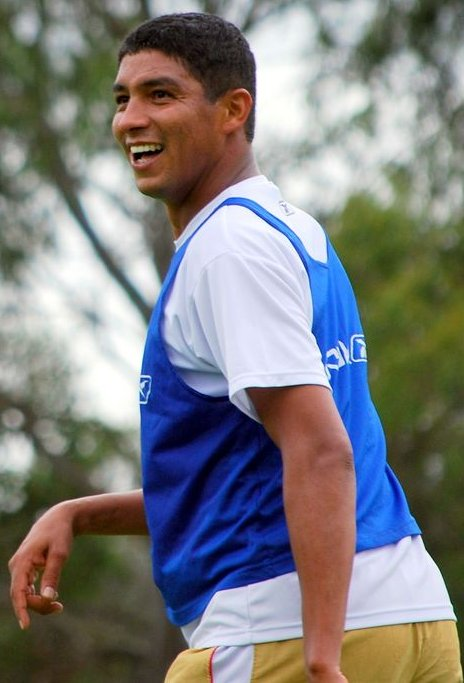
Mário Jardel, a striker in the late 1990s, scored 19 goals in 32 European matches.

Porto entered the 1991–92 Cup Winners' Cup following their seventh Portuguese Cup final win in mid-1991, but their campaign ended in the second round against Tottenham. In the 1992–93 season, UEFA renamed the European Cup to UEFA Champions League and confirmed the introduction of a round-robin group stage, tested in the previous season. Apart from 1994–95, when they competed for the last time in the Cup Winners' Cup – being eliminated on penalties in the quarter-finals against Sampdoria – Porto were present in every edition of the Champions League from its founding season to 1999–2000. In the first edition, Porto overcame two preliminary rounds to reach the group stage, where they played IFK Göteborg, Milan, and PSV Eindhoven. Two wins in six matches resulted in a third place in the group and failure to progress to the final (only accessible for the group winners). They returned the following season to the group stage and were drawn against Anderlecht, Werder Bremen, and Milan. Buoyed by a 5–0 away defeat of the Germans, Porto secured the group's runner-up place and a semi-final meeting with Barcelona. The one-legged tie was drawn to take place at Camp Nou, and ended with a 3–0 victory for the home side.

The 1995–96 UEFA Champions League participation was short-lived as Porto finished outside of their group's top two places. The following season, they were drawn into a group with Milan for the third time in four participations. Having failed to beat the Italians in their previous meetings, Porto were on the verge of suffering another defeat in San Siro, as they trailed Milan by 2–1 with 20 minutes to go. However, two goals by Mário Jardel overturned the score and sealed the win for Porto. They were confirmed as group winners after victories over IFK Göteborg and Rosenborg. In the quarter-finals, they fell to Manchester United after a 4–0 away loss. Porto did not progress past the group stage of the two subsequent Champions League seasons, coming last in 1997–98 and third in 1998–99. The club got back on track in the 1999–2000 season, overcoming two consecutive group stages to meet Bayern Munich in the quarter-finals. Having drawn 1–1 in Portugal, Bayern took an early lead in the second leg; Porto leveled the score in the 88th minute, but one minute later, the Germans scored the winning goal.

Sporting won the 1999–2000 Primeira Liga and ended Porto's chances to clinch a record sixth consecutive title. As runners-up, Porto had to go through a qualifying round to reach the 2000–01 UEFA Champions League group stage. However, a loss to Anderlecht meant elimination and consequent transfer into that season's UEFA Cup, where they were beaten in the quarter-finals by the eventual winners, Liverpool. Having lost the 2000–01 season's league title to city rivals Boavista, Porto had to start their 2001–02 Champions League participation in the second qualifying round. They defeated Welsh side Barry Town and Grasshoppers to reach the first group stage, where they finished runners-up to Juventus. In the second group stage, Porto registered four losses in six matches, finishing in the fourth and last place. Domestically, the club concluded the league in third place, just outside the Champions League qualification places. Midway through the season, Porto sacked coach Octávio Machado and hired 38-year-old Portuguese coach José Mourinho, who had led Leiria to their best-ever league finish.

FC Porto fixtures in international competitions (1991–2002)
Season	Competition	Round	Opponent	Home	Away	Agg.	Ref.
1991–92	Cup Winners' Cup	R1	(Malta) Valletta	1–0	3–0	4–0	
1991–92	Cup Winners' Cup	R2	(England) Tottenham Hotspur	0–0	1–3	1–3	
1992–93	UEFA Champions League	R1	Union Luxembourg	5–0	4–1	9–1	
1992–93	UEFA Champions League	R2	(Switzerland) Sion	4–0	2–2	6–2	
1992–93	UEFA Champions League	GS	(Netherlands) PSV Eindhoven	2–2	0–1	3rd	
1992–93	UEFA Champions League	GS	(Sweden) IFK Göteborg	2–0	0–1	3rd	
1992–93	UEFA Champions League	GS	(Italy) Milan	0–1	0–1	3rd	
1993–94	UEFA Champions League	R1	(Malta) Floriana	2–0	0–0	2–0	
1993–94	UEFA Champions League	R2	(Netherlands) Feyenoord	1–0	0–0	1–0	
1993–94	UEFA Champions League	GS	(Germany) Werder Bremen	3–2	5–0	2nd	
1993–94	UEFA Champions League	GS	(Italy) Milan	0–0	0–3	2nd	
1993–94	UEFA Champions League	GS	(Belgium) Anderlecht	2–0	0–1	2nd	
1993–94	UEFA Champions League	SF	(Spain) Barcelona	—N/a	—N/a	0–3	
1994–95	UEFA Cup Winners' Cup	R1	(Poland) ŁKS Łódź	2–0	1–0	3–0	
1994–95	UEFA Cup Winners' Cup	R2	(Hungary) Ferencváros	6–0	0–2	6–2	
1994–95	UEFA Cup Winners' Cup	QF	(Italy) Sampdoria	0–1 (aet)	1–0	1–1 (3–5 p)	
1995–96	UEFA Champions League	GS	(France) Nantes	2–2	0–0	3rd	
1995–96	UEFA Champions League	GS	(Denmark) AaB	2–0	2–2	3rd	
1995–96	UEFA Champions League	GS	(Greece) Panathinaikos	0–1	0–0	3rd	
1996–97	UEFA Champions League	GS	(Italy) Milan	1–1	3–2	1st	
1996–97	UEFA Champions League	GS	(Sweden) IFK Göteborg	2–1	2–0	1st	
1996–97	UEFA Champions League	GS	(Norway) Rosenborg	3–0	1–0	1st	
1996–97	UEFA Champions League	QF	(England) Manchester United	0–0	0–4	0–4	
1997–98	UEFA Champions League	GS	(Greece) Olympiacos	2–1	0–1	4th	
1997–98	UEFA Champions League	GS	(Spain) Real Madrid	0–2	0–4	4th	
1997–98	UEFA Champions League	GS	(Norway) Rosenborg	1–1	0–2	4th	
1998–99	UEFA Champions League	GS	(Greece) Olympiacos	2–2	1–2	3rd	
1998–99	UEFA Champions League	GS	(Netherlands) Ajax	3–0	1–2	3rd	
1998–99	UEFA Champions League	GS	Croatia Zagreb	3–0	1–3	3rd	
1999–2000	UEFA Champions League	GS1	(Norway) Molde	3–1	1–0	2nd	
1999–2000	UEFA Champions League	GS1	(Greece) Olympiacos	2–0	0–1	2nd	
1999–2000	UEFA Champions League	GS1	(Spain) Real Madrid	2–1	1–3	2nd	
1999–2000	UEFA Champions League	GS2	(Czech Republic) Sparta Prague	2–2	2–0	2nd	
1999–2000	UEFA Champions League	GS2	(Germany) Hertha BSC	1–0	1–0	2nd	
1999–2000	UEFA Champions League	GS2	(Spain) Barcelona	0–2	2–4	2nd	
1999–2000	UEFA Champions League	QF	(Germany) Bayern Munich	1–1	1–2	2–3	
2000–01	UEFA Champions League	Q3	(Belgium) Anderlecht	0–0	0–1	0–1	
2000–01	UEFA Cup	R1	(Serbia and Montenegro) Partizan	1–0	1–1	2–1	
2000–01	UEFA Cup	R2	(Poland) Wisła Kraków	3–0	0–0	3–0	
2000–01	UEFA Cup	R3	(Spain) Espanyol	0–0	2–0	2–0	
2000–01	UEFA Cup	R4	(France) Nantes Atlantique	3–1	1–2	4–3	
2000–01	UEFA Cup	QF	(England) Liverpool	0–0	0–2	0–2	
2001–02	UEFA Champions League	Q2	(Wales) Barry Town	8–0	1–3	9–3	
2001–02	UEFA Champions League	Q3	(Switzerland) Grasshoppers	2–2	3–2	5–4	
2001–02	UEFA Champions League	GS1	(Norway) Rosenborg	1–0	2–1	2nd	
2001–02	UEFA Champions League	GS1	(Scotland) Celtic	3–0	0–1	2nd	
2001–02	UEFA Champions League	GS1	(Italy) Juventus	0–0	1–3	2nd	
2001–02	UEFA Champions League	GS2	(Greece) Panathinaikos	2–1	0–0	4th	
2001–02	UEFA Champions League	GS2	(Czech Republic) Sparta Prague	0–1	0–2	4th	
2001–02	UEFA Champions League	GS2	(Spain) Real Madrid	1–2	0–1	4th	
Porto goals appear first in scores.; Wins are highlighted in green, draws in yellow, and losses in red.

=== Return to glory – Mourinho years (2002–04) ===
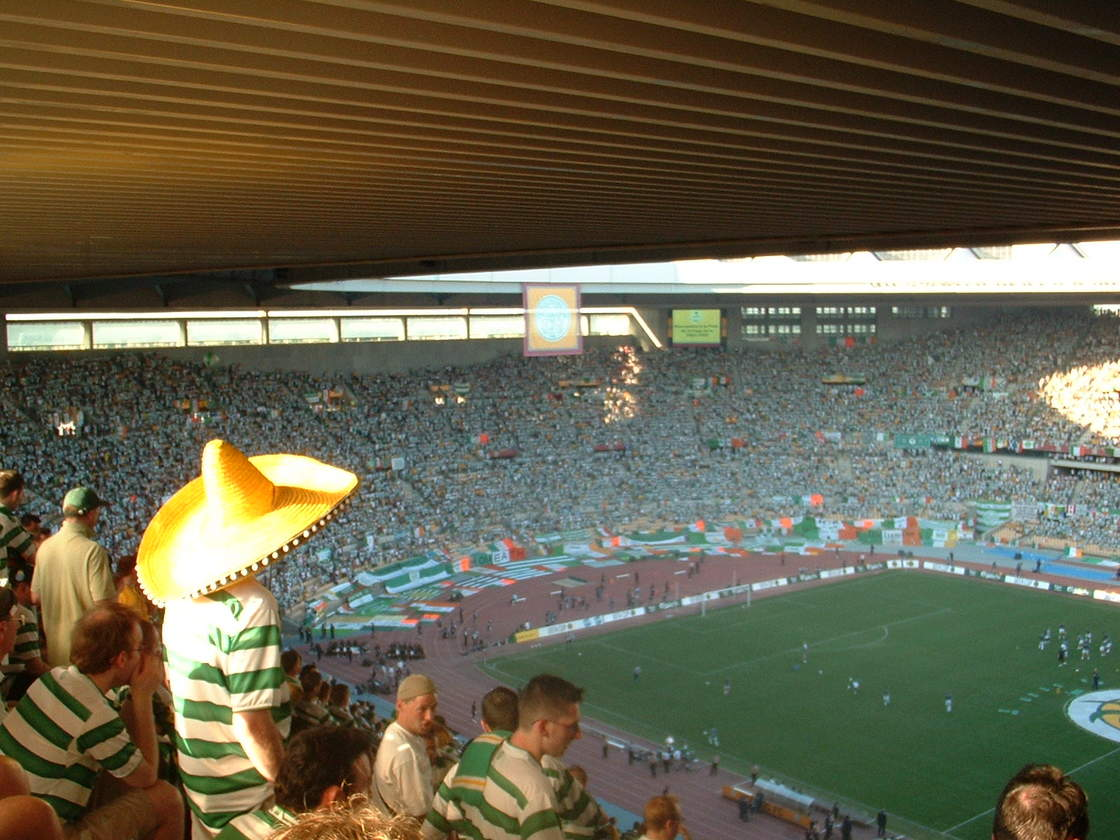
Celtic fans at the Estadio Olímpico in Seville, the 2003 UEFA Cup Final venue

Sitting fifth in the league, Porto consolidated their performances following Mourinho's arrival and registered a win–draw–loss record of 11–2–2 to climb to third place and qualify for the 2002–03 UEFA Cup. They progressed through the first four rounds with convincing wins, suffering only one defeat against French side Lens. In the quarter-finals, Porto were surprised at home with a 1–0 home defeat against Panathinaikos. In Athens, Derlei scored in the 16th minute to tie the round, and added a second goal in the first half of extra-time to propel Porto into the semi-finals. Facing Lazio at home for the first leg, Porto conceded an early goal by Claudio López. A few minutes later, Maniche's equaliser sparked a strong attacking display by the home team, which scored a further three goals to secure a significant advantage for the second leg. In Rome, a goalless draw confirmed Porto's presence in their third major European competition final, the first since their 1987 European Cup victory. Their opponents were Celtic, who had eliminated Boavista in the other semi-final to advance to their first European final since 1970.

Scheduled for 21 May 2003 at Seville's Estadio Olímpico, the 2003 UEFA Cup Final took place under an intense heat, which did not dissuade a 53,000-strong crowd of supporters, mostly in favour of the Scottish team. A contested first half was heading into half-time when, during injury time, Derlei put Porto ahead. Soon after the restart, Henrik Larsson headed Celtic's equaliser, but Dmitri Alenichev restored Porto's lead a few minutes later. Larsson again leveled the score, sending the match into extra-time. Despite Baldé's dismissal in the first half of extra-time, Celtic held on until the 115th minute, when Derlei intercepted a blocked shot and beat the goalkeeper to score the winning goal. His 12th goal in the competition confirmed him as the top scorer (ahead of Larsson), and inscribed Porto (and Portugal) into the list of UEFA Cup winners, for the first time. With their first Primeira Liga title in four years mathematically confirmed two weeks ahead of the Seville final, Mourinho then led Porto to victory in the Portuguese Cup final, against his former club, Leiria, to conclude a treble-winning season.

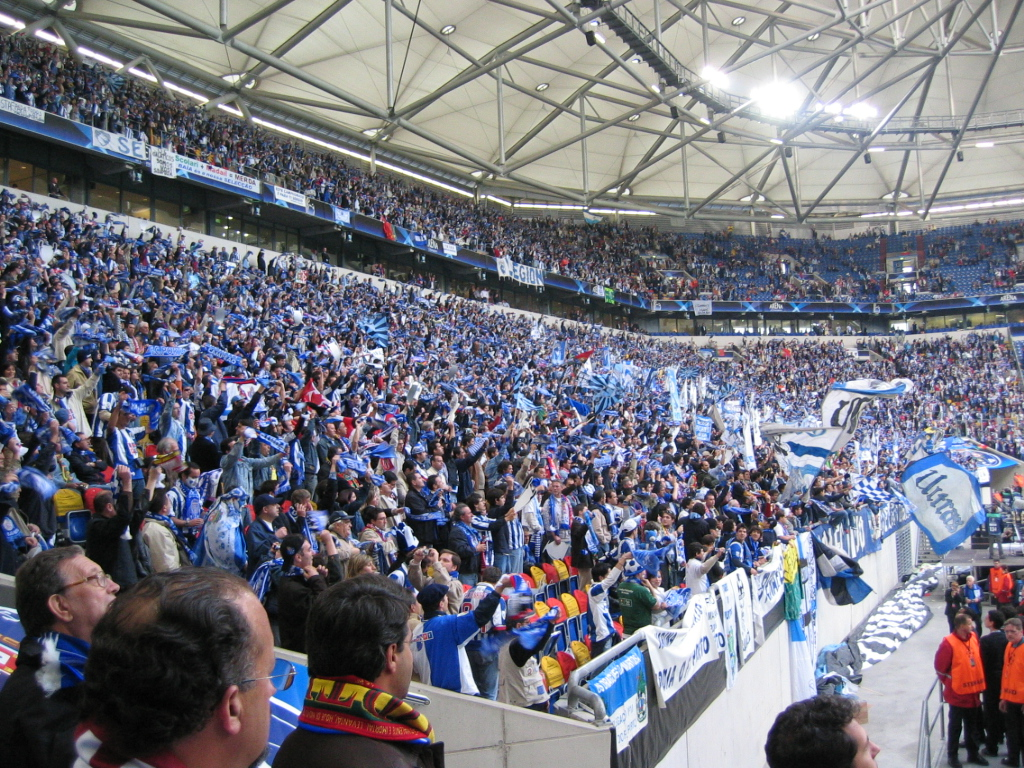
Porto supporters at the Arena AufSchalke, the 2004 UEFA Champions League Final venue

In late August, Porto kicked off their 2003–04 European season with a loss in the 2003 UEFA Super Cup match against the 2002–03 UEFA Champions League winners, Milan. Two weeks later, they began their 2003–04 UEFA Champions League campaign in a group comprising Real Madrid, Marseille, and Partizan. Porto qualified for the knockout phase as group runners-up, behind Real Madrid, who inflicted their only group stage defeat. The draw for the round of 16 paired Porto with Manchester United, with the first leg taking place in Portugal. In the first European club competition match at the Estádio do Dragão, Porto won 2–1 with goals from Benni McCarthy. At Old Trafford, Paul Scholes put the English side ahead in the match and in the round (advantage on away goals). On the brink of elimination, Porto earned a free kick in the 90th minute; McCarthy's shot was blocked near the line by goalkeeper Tim Howard, but Costinha caught the rebound and scored the equaliser that took Porto through to the next round. In the quarter-finals, they overcame another French team (Lyon) to advance to the Champions League semi-finals for the first time since 1994. Porto faced Deportivo La Coruña, who had convincingly eliminated the previous season's finalists, Juventus and Milan. A goalless first leg match in Portugal postponed the decision to the Estadio Riazor, where a penalty kick converted by Derlei confirmed Porto's second major European final in two consecutive seasons. The other finalists were AS Monaco, who had eliminated Real Madrid and Chelsea.

The Arena AufSchalke in Gelsenkirchen hosted the final, which provided one of the most lopsided results in European Cup and Champions League finals, as Porto defeated Monaco 3–0. Despite the score, Monaco were a pressing side and started off better with dangerous incursions into Porto's penalty area by captain Ludovic Giuly, who was replaced midway through the first half due to injury. In the 38th minute, Carlos Alberto opened the score for Porto. Despite one goal behind and without playmaker Giuly, Monaco created chances in the second half, but Alenichev and Deco set each other up for the second and third goals, respectively. Porto won UEFA's premier competition for the second time and became the second club to win the UEFA Cup and the European Champion Club's Cup in consecutive seasons, after Liverpool's 1975–76 UEFA Cup and 1976–77 European Cup wins. This was Mourinho's last match for Porto; a week later, he was presented as Chelsea's manager.

FC Porto fixtures in international competitions (2002–2004)
Season	Competition	Round	Opponent	Home	Away	Agg.	Ref.
2002–03	UEFA Cup	R1	(Poland) Polonia Warsaw	6–0	0–2	6–2	
2002–03	UEFA Cup	R2	Austria Wien	2–0	1–0	3–0	
2002–03	UEFA Cup	R3	(France) Lens	3–0	0–1	3–1	
2002–03	UEFA Cup	R4	(Turkey) Denizlispor	6–1	2–2	8–3	
2002–03	UEFA Cup	QF	(Greece) Panathinaikos	0–1	2–0 (aet)	2–1	
2002–03	UEFA Cup	SF	(Italy) Lazio	4–1	0–0	4–1	
2002–03	UEFA Cup	F	(Scotland) Celtic	—N/a	—N/a	3–2 (aet)	
2003	UEFA Super Cup		(Italy) Milan	—N/a	—N/a	0–1	
2003–04	UEFA Champions League	GS	(Serbia and Montenegro) Partizan	2–1	1–1	2nd	
2003–04	UEFA Champions League	GS	(Spain) Real Madrid	1–3	1–1	2nd	
2003–04	UEFA Champions League	GS	(France) Marseille	1–0	3–2	2nd	
2003–04	UEFA Champions League	R16	(England) Manchester United	2–1	1–1	3–2	
2003–04	UEFA Champions League	QF	(France) Lyon	2–0	2–2	4–2	
2003–04	UEFA Champions League	SF	(Spain) Deportivo La Coruña	0–0	1–0	1–0	
2003–04	UEFA Champions League	F	(France) Monaco	—N/a	—N/a	3–0	
Porto goals appear first in scores.; Wins are highlighted in green, draws in yellow, and losses in red.

=== Post-Mourinho transition and Ferreira years (2004–10) ===
Champions League success struck a hard blow in the team, which saw its influential coach and key players leave to clubs from prominent European leagues. To replace Mourinho, Porto signed Luigi Delneri but the Italian was sacked before overseeing an official match, and his place was taken by Víctor Fernández. His tenure did not start off well, as Porto lost the UEFA Super Cup for the second time in two years, going down 2–1 against Valencia. Filling the Champions League title-holder spot in the group stage of the following season's tournament, Porto were drawn together with Chelsea, which meant Mourinho's return to the Estádio do Dragão. In the last group match, they hosted the Londoners in need of a win to assure qualification. As Damien Duff put Chelsea ahead, Porto were at risk of becoming the first holders not to get past the group stage, but goals from Diego and McCarthy saved Porto from premature elimination. Nevertheless, the defending champions were subsequently knocked out in the round of 16, after losing 4–2 on aggregate against Inter. Before this tie, Porto returned to Japan to contest the last edition of the Intercontinental Cup, 17 years after their first triumph. They dominated Colombia's Once Caldas for most of the 90 minutes plus extra-time, but were unable to score. It took 18 kicks from the penalty mark to decide the match 8–7 for Porto and give the club their second and last title in this competition.

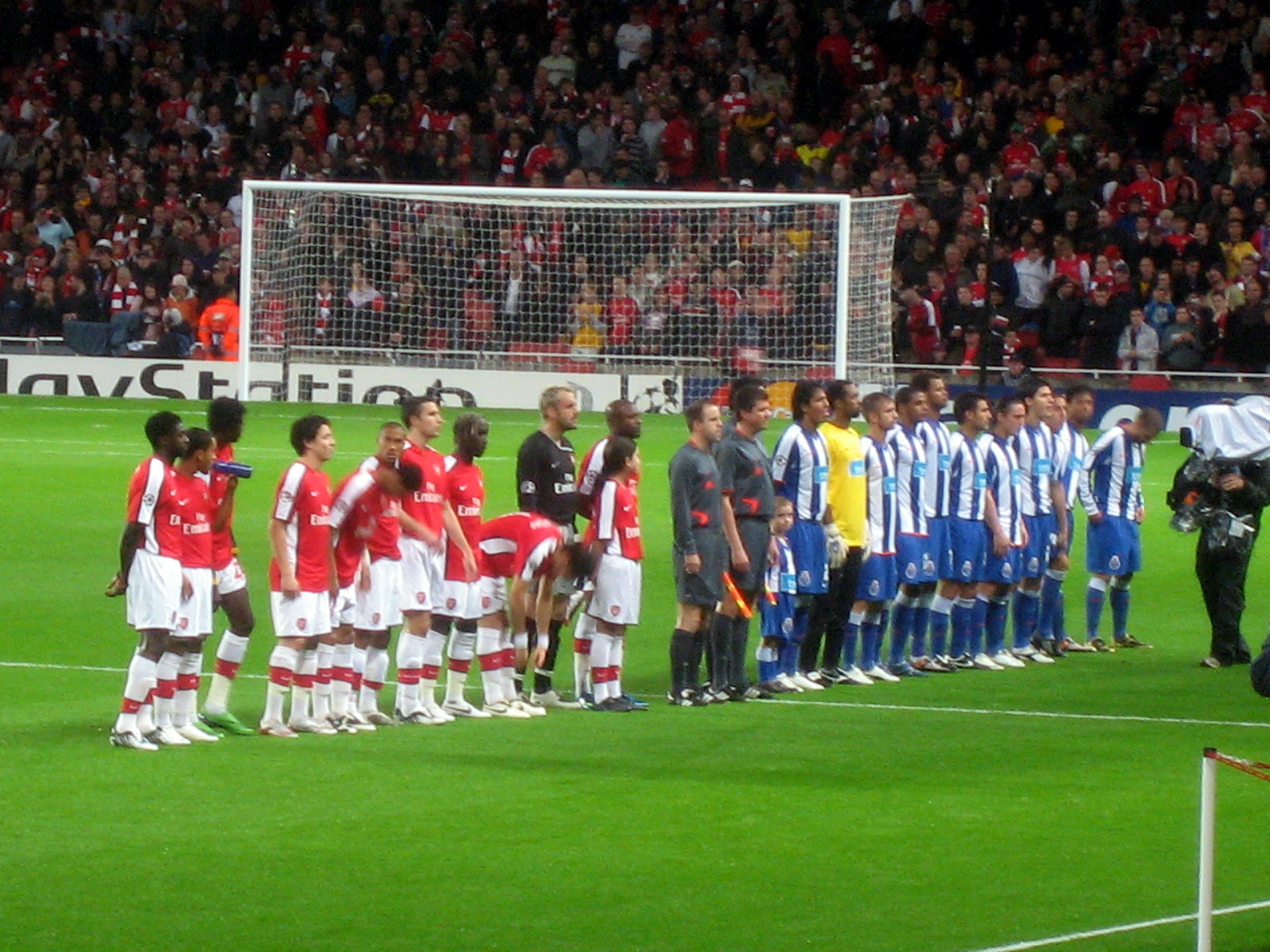
Arsenal and Porto teams before their 2008–09 UEFA Champions League group stage match in London

Despite the managerial instability – Fernández was replaced by José Couceiro soon after their Champions League elimination – and weak performances in league matches, Porto finished runners-up to Benfica and secured qualification for the 2005–06 UEFA Champions League group stage. Dutch coach Co Adriaanse was appointed as the new coach for the 2005–06 season, and although his team delivered domestically – reclaiming both Portuguese league and Cup titles – it disappointed in the Champions League, as Porto finished last of their group, with one win and three losses. In reaction to Adriaanse's resignation in the summer of 2006, the club signed experienced coach Jesualdo Ferreira from Boavista. Porto qualified from their Champions League group with the same points as Arsenal, but behind on head-to-head standings. Paired with Chelsea in the round of 16, Porto drew the first leg match in Portugal but were eliminated with a 2–1 loss in London.

Porto won three consecutive Primeira Liga titles with Ferreira, ensuring their presence in the three subsequent Champions League seasons. In 2007–08, Porto fell again in the round of 16, losing to Schalke 04 in a penalty shootout. In the following season's round of 16, they eliminated Atlético Madrid on away goals and progressed to a quarter-final tie with Manchester United. A two-all draw in Manchester gave Porto the upper hand in the round, but a Cristiano Ronaldo goal in the opening minutes of the return leg ended their European run. The 2009–10 UEFA Champions League season was Ferreira's last in charge of Porto, and like in previous years, he successfully guided the team past the group stage. In the round of 16, a 2–1 home win over Arsenal was obliterated by a 5–0 defeat in London, which included a hat-trick from Nicklas Bendtner. Domestically, Porto failed to win a fifth consecutive league title and their third-place finish excluded them from competing in the 2010–11 Champions League. However, victory in the Portuguese Cup final confirmed the club's entry in the play-off round of the 2010–11 UEFA Europa League.

FC Porto fixtures in international competitions (2004–2010)
Season	Competition	Round	Opponent	Home	Away	Agg.	Ref.
2004	UEFA Super Cup		(Spain) Valencia	—N/a	—N/a	1–2	
2004	Intercontinental Cup		(Colombia) Once Caldas	—N/a	—N/a	0–0 (a.e.t.) (8–7 p)	
2004–05	UEFA Champions League	GS	(Russia) CSKA Moscow	0–0	1–0	2nd	
2004–05	UEFA Champions League	GS	(England) Chelsea	2–1	1–3	2nd	
2004–05	UEFA Champions League	GS	(France) Paris Saint-Germain	0–0	0–2	2nd	
2004–05	UEFA Champions League	R16	(Italy) Internazionale	1–1	1–3	2–4	
2005–06	UEFA Champions League	GS	(Scotland) Rangers	1–1	2–3	4th	
2005–06	UEFA Champions League	GS	(Slovakia) Artmedia Bratislava	2–3	0–0	4th	
2005–06	UEFA Champions League	GS	(Italy) Internazionale	2–0	1–2	4th	
2006–07	UEFA Champions League	GS	(Russia) CSKA Moscow	0–0	2–0	2nd	
2006–07	UEFA Champions League	GS	(England) Arsenal	0–0	0–2	2nd	
2006–07	UEFA Champions League	GS	(Germany) Hamburger SV	4–1	3–1	2nd	
2006–07	UEFA Champions League	R16	(England) Chelsea	1–1	1–2	2–3	
2007–08	UEFA Champions League	GS	(England) Liverpool	1–1	1–4	1st	
2007–08	UEFA Champions League	GS	(Turkey) Beşiktaş	2–0	1–0	1st	
2007–08	UEFA Champions League	GS	(France) Marseille	2–1	1–1	1st	
2007–08	UEFA Champions League	R16	(Germany) Schalke 04	1–0 (aet)	0–1	1–1 (1–4 p)	
2008–09	UEFA Champions League	GS	(Turkey) Fenerbahçe	3–1	2–1	1st	
2008–09	UEFA Champions League	GS	(England) Arsenal	2–0	0–4	1st	
2008–09	UEFA Champions League	GS	(Ukraine) Dynamo Kyiv	0–1	2–1	1st	
2008–09	UEFA Champions League	R16	(Spain) Atlético Madrid	0–0	2–2	2–2 (a)	
2008–09	UEFA Champions League	QF	(England) Manchester United	0–1	2–2	2–3	
2009–10	UEFA Champions League	GS	(England) Chelsea	0–1	0–1	2nd	
2009–10	UEFA Champions League	GS	(Spain) Atlético Madrid	2–0	3–0	2nd	
2009–10	UEFA Champions League	GS	(Cyprus) APOEL	2–1	1–0	2nd	
2009–10	UEFA Champions League	R16	(England) Arsenal	2–1	0–5	2–6	
Porto goals appear first in scores.; Wins are highlighted in green, draws in yellow, and losses in red.

=== Recent years (2010–present) ===
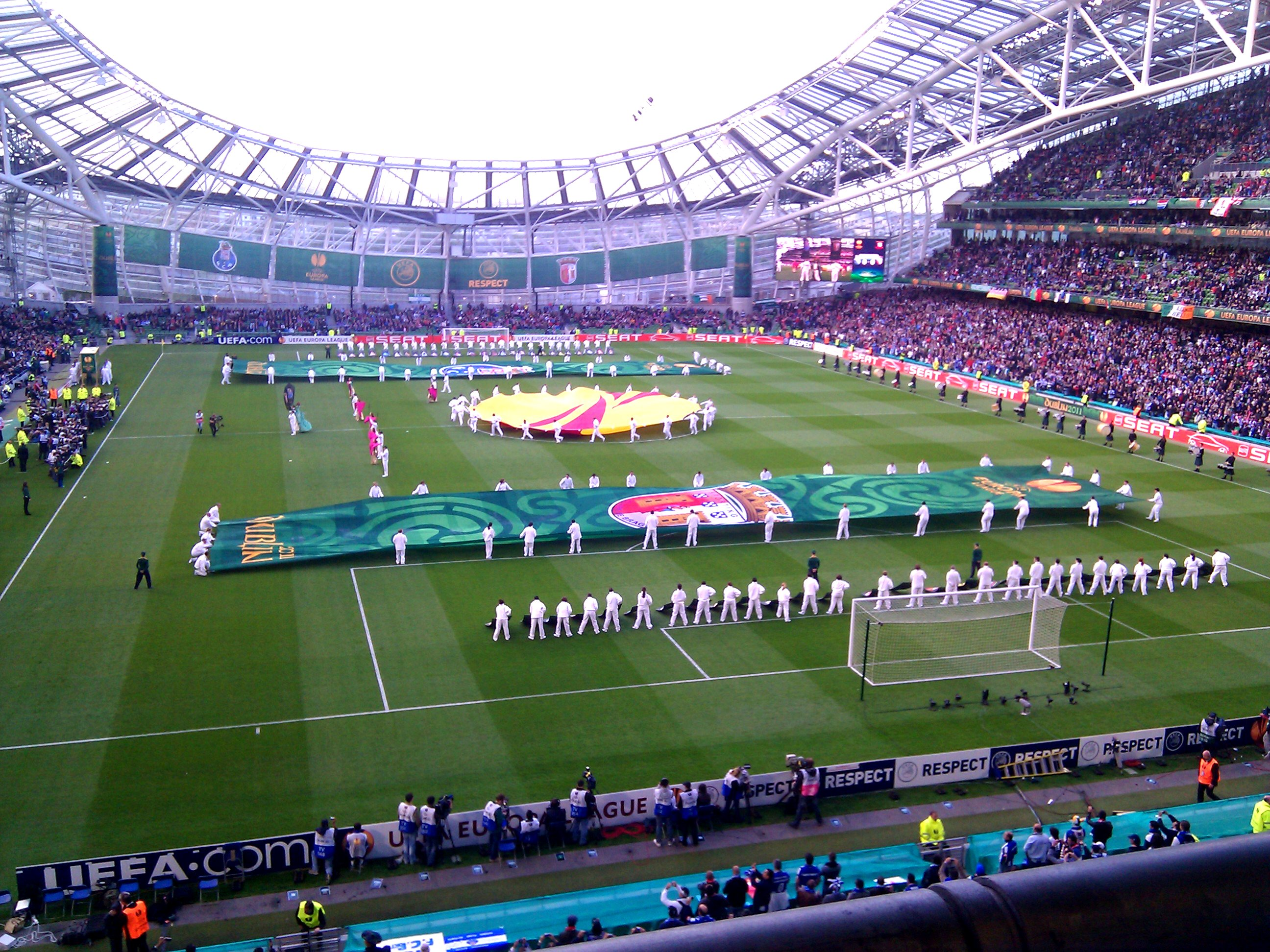
The Aviva Stadium in Dublin hosted the 2011 UEFA Europa League final (opening ceremony pictured), won by Porto 1–0 against Portuguese rivals Braga.

Ferreira stepped down at the end of the 2009–10 season and was replaced by André Villas-Boas, a former assistant of Mourinho at Porto, Chelsea, and Internazionale. In a single season, Villas-Boas guided the team to a record-matching four titles, including victory in the 2010–11 UEFA Europa League. Their triumphant campaign started in the play-off round, where they overcame Belgian side Genk to reach the group stage. Porto topped their group undefeated, only dropping points against Beşiktaş. In the round of 32, despite a second-leg home loss, they eliminated the 2005–06 and 2006–07 UEFA Cup winners Sevilla, setting up a tie with CSKA Moscow. Porto defeated the Russians in both legs and advanced to the quarter-finals, where they were paired against another Muscovite club, this time Spartak Moscow. Two prolific displays, which included a hat-trick by Radamel Falcao, sealed a 10–3 aggregate win for Porto. In the semi-finals, Falcao went one better and scored four goals in a first-leg 5–1 win against Villarreal, which all but confirmed the club's fourth major European final. The Dublin final was an all-Portuguese affair between Porto and Primeira Liga rivals Braga. Contrasting with previous matches in the tournament, Porto's performance was more contained and victory was secured with a single goal by Falcao, who became the competition's top scorer.

In June 2011, Villas-Boas left Porto to become Chelsea's manager. He took his technical staff to London, except his assistant coach Vítor Pereira, who became the club's new coach. His first European match was against Barcelona, for the 2011 UEFA Super Cup. In their third appearance in the Monaco showpiece match, Porto left once again as runners-up, after losing 2–0. They did not get through the 2011–12 UEFA Champions League group stage, after conceding defeats to APOEL and Zenit Saint Petersburg, the eventual group winners and runners-up. Transferred to the UEFA Europa League round of 32, the defending champions were knocked out by Manchester City with a 6–1 aggregate loss. As 2011–12 Primeira Liga winners, Porto assured their return to the Champions League in the following season. Having finished second to Paris Saint-Germain in a group containing Dinamo Zagreb and Dynamo Kiev, Porto qualified to the round of 16, where they faced tournament debutants Málaga. Unable to capitalize on a first-leg 1–0 advantage, Porto lost 2–0 at La Rosaleda Stadium and were eliminated. The club secured its third consecutive league title in the last matchday, ensuring a place in the 2013–14 UEFA Champions League group stage. Having finished third in their group, behind Atlético Madrid and Zenit Saint Petersburg, Porto were demoted to the UEFA Europa League; they were eliminated in the quarter-finals by eventual winners Sevilla.

Porto failed a fourth successive league title by finishing third in the 2013–14 Primeira Liga, and therefore had to contest the following season's Champions League play-off round. They overcame French side Lille to reach the group stage, and won their group ahead of Shakhtar Donetsk, Athletic Bilbao and Belarusian champions BATE Borisov. During this stage, Porto recorded their biggest win in this competition after beating BATE Borisov 6–0 at the Estádio do Dragão. The team then eliminated Basel to reach the quarter-finals for the first time since 2008–09. Drawn against Bayern Munich, Porto hosted the German champions for the first leg and grabbed a shocking 3–1 win, with goals from Ricardo Quaresma and Jackson Martínez. A week later, in Munich, Porto were eliminated after suffering an all-time club record-matching 6–1 away defeat (tied with the loss to AEK Athens, and 5–0 losses to Hannover 96, PSV Eindhoven, Arsenal, and Liverpool). A runner-up finish in the 2014–15 Primeira Liga earned Porto's fifth consecutive participation in the Champions League group stage in 2015–16. After a positive start, defeats in the last two matches against Dynamo Kyiv and Chelsea relegated the club to that season's Europa League round of 32, where they were knocked out by Borussia Dortmund.

In the 2016–17 edition, Porto finished second in the group stage, behind English side Leicester City. In the round of 16, Porto faced Juventus. They lost the first match (at home) 0–2 and later, in Italy, suffered a 1–0 defeat in the second leg, ending Porto's run in the Champions League. In the following 2017–18 edition, Porto once again qualified for the round of 16 and encountered another English team, Liverpool. They were defeated 5–0 in the first leg and managed a 0–0 draw in the second. In the 2018–19 UEFA Champions League, FC Porto reached the group stages where they finished atop Group D, winning five matches and drawing one out of the six games. In the round of 16, Porto traveled to Italy to face Roma in the first leg, losing 2–1. In the second leg, playing at home, they avenged their loss in Italy, defeating Roma 3–1 after extra time and progressing to the next phase. In the quarter-finals, they met Liverpool, the team that had eliminated them in the previous edition. Porto lost 2–0 in the first leg and 4–1 in the second.

In the 2019–20 edition, Porto failed to qualify for the Champions League and were relegated to the Europa League. They progressed to the round of 32 after finishing first in Group G. There, they were eventually knocked out by Bayer Leverkusen with an aggregate score of 5–2. After becoming the national champions in the 2019–20 season, Porto qualified for the 2020–21 edition of the Champions League. They finished the group stages in second place in Group C, only behind Manchester City. In the round of 16, they faced Juventus, which featured star player Cristiano Ronaldo. In the first leg, Porto achieved their first victory over Juventus, winning 2–1. This win marked Porto's 115th win in the top European competition, making them the most successful Portuguese football team in this regard, surpassing Benfica's 114 victories. In the second leg, playing at Juventus's home ground, Porto lost 3–2 (making it 4–4 on aggregate) but advanced to the quarter-finals due to the away goals rule, despite playing with one man down from the 54th minute after Taremi received a red card. Both goals for Porto were scored by Sérgio Oliveira. The club then progressed to the quarter-finals where they faced Chelsea, marking their 11th appearance in the quarters of the top European club competition, and the eighth since it was renamed the Champions League. Losing the first leg at home 2–0, Chelsea secured a significant advantage with two away goals. In the second leg, Porto managed to secure a victory at Chelsea's home ground with a score of 1–0, a positive outcome but not enough to overturn the aggregate result from the two matches. Finishing the Portuguese championship of 2020–21 in second place, Porto qualified for the group stage of the 2021–22 UEFA Champions League.

FC Porto fixtures in international competitions (2010–present)
Season	Competition	Round	Opponent	Home	Away	Agg.	Ref.
2010–11	UEFA Europa League	PO	(Belgium) Genk	4–2	3–0	7–2	
2010–11	UEFA Europa League	GS	(Austria) Rapid Wien	3–0	3–1	1st	
2010–11	UEFA Europa League	GS	(Bulgaria) CSKA Sofia	3–1	1–0	1st	
2010–11	UEFA Europa League	GS	(Turkey) Beşiktaş	1–1	3–1	1st	
2010–11	UEFA Europa League	R32	(Spain) Sevilla	0–1	2–1	2–2 (a)	
2010–11	UEFA Europa League	R16	(Russia) CSKA Moscow	2–1	1–0	3–1	
2010–11	UEFA Europa League	QF	(Russia) Spartak Moscow	5–1	5–2	10–3	
2010–11	UEFA Europa League	SF	(Spain) Villarreal	5–1	2–3	7–4	
2010–11	UEFA Europa League	F	(Portugal) Braga	—N/a	—N/a	1–0	
2011	UEFA Super Cup		(Spain) Barcelona	—N/a	—N/a	0–2	
2011–12	UEFA Champions League	GS	(Ukraine) Shakhtar Donetsk	2–1	2–0	3rd	
2011–12	UEFA Champions League	GS	(Russia) Zenit Saint Petersburg	0–0	1–3	3rd	
2011–12	UEFA Champions League	GS	(Cyprus) APOEL	1–1	1–2	3rd	
2011–12	UEFA Europa League	R32	(England) Manchester City	1–2	0–4	1–6	
2012–13	UEFA Champions League	GS	(Croatia) Dinamo Zagreb	3–0	2–0	2nd	
2012–13	UEFA Champions League	GS	(France) Paris Saint-Germain	1–0	1–2	2nd	
2012–13	UEFA Champions League	GS	(Ukraine) Dynamo Kyiv	3–2	0–0	2nd	
2012–13	UEFA Champions League	R16	(Spain) Málaga	1–0	0–2	1–2	
2013–14	UEFA Champions League	GS	Austria Wien	1–1	1–0	3rd	
2013–14	UEFA Champions League	GS	(Spain) Atlético Madrid	1–2	0–2	3rd	
2013–14	UEFA Champions League	GS	(Russia) Zenit Saint Petersburg	0–1	1–1	3rd	
2013–14	UEFA Europa League	R32	(Germany) Eintracht Frankfurt	2–2	3–3	5–5 (a)	
2013–14	UEFA Europa League	R16	(Italy) Napoli	1–0	2–2	3–2	
2013–14	UEFA Europa League	QF	(Spain) Sevilla	1–0	0–4	1–4	
2014–15	UEFA Champions League	PO	(France) Lille	1–0	2–0	3–1	
2014–15	UEFA Champions League	GS	(Belarus) BATE Borisov	6–0	3–0	1st	
2014–15	UEFA Champions League	GS	(Ukraine) Shakhtar Donetsk	1–1	2–2	1st	
2014–15	UEFA Champions League	GS	(Spain) Athletic Bilbao	2–1	2–0	1st	
2014–15	UEFA Champions League	R16	(Switzerland) Basel	4–0	1–1	5–1	
2014–15	UEFA Champions League	QF	(Germany) Bayern Munich	3–1	1–6	4–7	
2015–16	UEFA Champions League	GS	(Ukraine) Dynamo Kyiv	0–2	2–2	3rd	
2015–16	UEFA Champions League	GS	(England) Chelsea	2–1	0–2	3rd	
2015–16	UEFA Champions League	GS	(Israel) Maccabi Tel Aviv	2–0	3–1	3rd	
2015–16	UEFA Europa League	R32	(Germany) Borussia Dortmund	0–1	0–2	0–3	
2016–17	UEFA Champions League	PO	(Italy) Roma	1–1	3–0	4–1	
2016–17	UEFA Champions League	GS	(Denmark) Copenhagen	1–1	0–0	2nd	
2016–17	UEFA Champions League	GS	(England) Leicester City	5–0	0–1	2nd	
2016–17	UEFA Champions League	GS	(Belgium) Club Brugge	1–0	2–1	2nd	
2016–17	UEFA Champions League	R16	(Italy) Juventus	0–2	0–1	0–3	
2017–18	UEFA Champions League	GS	(Turkey) Beşiktaş	1–3	1–1	2nd	
2017–18	UEFA Champions League	GS	(France) Monaco	5–2	3–0	2nd	
2017–18	UEFA Champions League	GS	(Germany) RB Leipzig	3–1	2–3	2nd	
2017–18	UEFA Champions League	R16	(England) Liverpool	0–5	0–0	0–5	
2018–19	UEFA Champions League	GS	(Germany) Schalke 04	3–1	1–1	1st	
2018–19	UEFA Champions League	GS	(Turkey) Galatasaray	1–0	3–2	1st	
2018–19	UEFA Champions League	GS	(Russia) Lokomotiv Moscow	4–1	3–1	1st	
2018–19	UEFA Champions League	R16	(Italy) Roma	3–1 (a.e.t.)	1–2	4–3	
2018–19	UEFA Champions League	QF	(England) Liverpool	1–4	0–2	1–6	
2019–20	UEFA Champions League	Q3	(Russia) Krasnodar	2–3	1–0	3–3 (a)	
2019–20	UEFA Europa League	GS	(Switzerland) Young Boys	2–1	2–1	1st	
2019–20	UEFA Europa League	GS	(Netherlands) Feyenoord	3–2	0–2	1st	
2019–20	UEFA Europa League	GS	(Scotland) Rangers	1–1	0–2	1st	
2019–20	UEFA Europa League	R32	(Germany) Bayer Leverkusen	1–3	1–2	2–5	
2020–21	UEFA Champions League	GS	(England) Manchester City	0–0	1–3	2nd	
2020–21	UEFA Champions League	GS	(France) Marseille	3–0	2–0	2nd	
2020–21	UEFA Champions League	GS	(Greece) Olympiacos	2–0	2–0	2nd	
2020–21	UEFA Champions League	R16	(Italy) Juventus	2–1	2–3 (a.e.t.)	4–4 (a)	
2020–21	UEFA Champions League	QF	(England) Chelsea	0–2	1–0	1–2	
2021–22	UEFA Champions League	GS	(Spain) Atlético Madrid	1–3	0–0	3rd	
2021–22	UEFA Champions League	GS	(England) Liverpool	1–5	0–2	3rd	
2021–22	UEFA Champions League	GS	(Italy) Milan	1–0	1–1	3rd	
2021–22	UEFA Europa League	KPO	(Italy) Lazio	2–1	2–2	4–3	
2021–22	UEFA Europa League	R16	(France) Lyon	0–1	1–1	1–2	
2022–23	UEFA Champions League	GS	(Spain) Atlético Madrid	2–1	1–2	1st	
2022–23	UEFA Champions League	GS	(Belgium) Club Brugge	0–4	4–0	1st	
2022–23	UEFA Champions League	GS	(Germany) Bayer Leverkusen	2–0	3–0	1st	
2022–23	UEFA Champions League	R16	(Italy) Internazionale	0–0	0–1	0–1	
2023–24	UEFA Champions League	GS	(Ukraine) Shakhtar Donetsk	5–3	3–1	2nd	
2023–24	UEFA Champions League	GS	(Spain) Barcelona	0–1	1–2	2nd	
2023–24	UEFA Champions League	GS	(Belgium) Antwerp	2–0	4–1	2nd	
2023–24	UEFA Champions League	R16	(England) Arsenal	1–0	0–1 (a.e.t.)	1–1 (2–4 p)	
2024–25	UEFA Europa League	LP	(Norway) Bodø/Glimt	—N/a	2–3	18th	
2024–25	UEFA Europa League	LP	(England) Manchester United	3–3	—N/a	18th	
2024–25	UEFA Europa League	LP	(Germany) TSG Hoffenheim	2–0	—N/a	18th	
2024–25	UEFA Europa League	LP	(Italy) Lazio	—N/a	1–2	18th	
2024–25	UEFA Europa League	LP	(Belgium) Anderlecht	—N/a	2–2	18th	
2024–25	UEFA Europa League	LP	(Denmark) Midtjylland	2–0	—N/a	18th	
2024–25	UEFA Europa League	LP	(Greece) Olympiacos	0–1	—N/a	18th	
2024–25	UEFA Europa League	LP	(Israel) Maccabi Tel Aviv	—N/a	1–0	18th	
2024–25	UEFA Europa League	KPO	(Italy) Roma	1–1	2–3	3–4	
2025	FIFA Club World Cup	GS	(Brazil) Palmeiras	—N/a	—N/a	0–0	
2025	FIFA Club World Cup	GS	(United States) Inter Miami CF	—N/a	—N/a	1–2	
2025	FIFA Club World Cup	GS	(Egypt) Al Ahly	—N/a	—N/a	4–4	
2025–26	UEFA Europa League	LP	(Austria) Red Bull Salzburg	—N/a	1–0	5th	
2025–26	UEFA Europa League	LP	(Serbia) Red Star Belgrade	2–1	—N/a	5th	
2025–26	UEFA Europa League	LP	(England) Nottingham Forest	—N/a	0–2	5th	
2025–26	UEFA Europa League	LP	(Netherlands) Utrecht	—N/a	1–1	5th	
2025–26	UEFA Europa League	LP	(France) Nice	3–0	—N/a	5th	
2025–26	UEFA Europa League	LP	(Sweden) Malmö FF	2–1	—N/a	5th	
2025–26	UEFA Europa League	LP	(Czech Republic) Viktoria Plzeň	—N/a	1–1	5th	
2025–26	UEFA Europa League	LP	(Scotland) Rangers	3–1	—N/a	5th	
2025–26	UEFA Europa League	R16	(Germany) VfB Stuttgart	2–0	2–1	4–1	
2025–26	UEFA Europa League	QF	(England) Nottingham Forest	1–1	0–1	1–2	
2026–27	UEFA Champions League	LP	(England) Manchester City	0–2	—N/a		
2026–27	UEFA Champions League	LP	(Spain) Real Betis	—N/a	2–3		
2026–27	UEFA Champions League	LP	(Netherlands) PSV Eindhoven	0–1	—N/a		
2026–27	UEFA Champions League	LP	(Italy) Napoli	4–1	—N/a		
2026–27	UEFA Champions League	LP	(Netherlands) Feyenoord	—N/a			
2026–27	UEFA Champions League	LP	(England) Liverpool	—N/a			
2026–27	UEFA Champions League	LP	(Czech Republic) Slavia Prague		—N/a		
2026–27	UEFA Champions League	LP	(Austria) LASK	—N/a			
Porto goals appear first in scores.; Wins are highlighted in green, draws in yellow, and losses in red.

== Records ==
As of 4 November 2026

Key

- Pld = Matches played
- W = Matches won
- D = Matches drawn
- L = Matches lost
- GF = Goals for
- GA = Goals against
- GD = Goal difference
- F = Finals
- FW = Finals won
- FL = Finals lost
- GS = Group stage
- GS2 = Second group stage
- LP = League phase
- PO = Play-off round
- KPO = Knockout play-offs
- PR = Preliminary round
- Q3 = Third qualifying round
- QF = Quarter-finals
- R1 = First round
- R2 = Second round
- R3 = Third round
- R16 = Round of 16
- R32 = Round of 32
- SF = Semi-finals
- W = Winners
- RU = Runners-up

=== Team, coaches and players ===
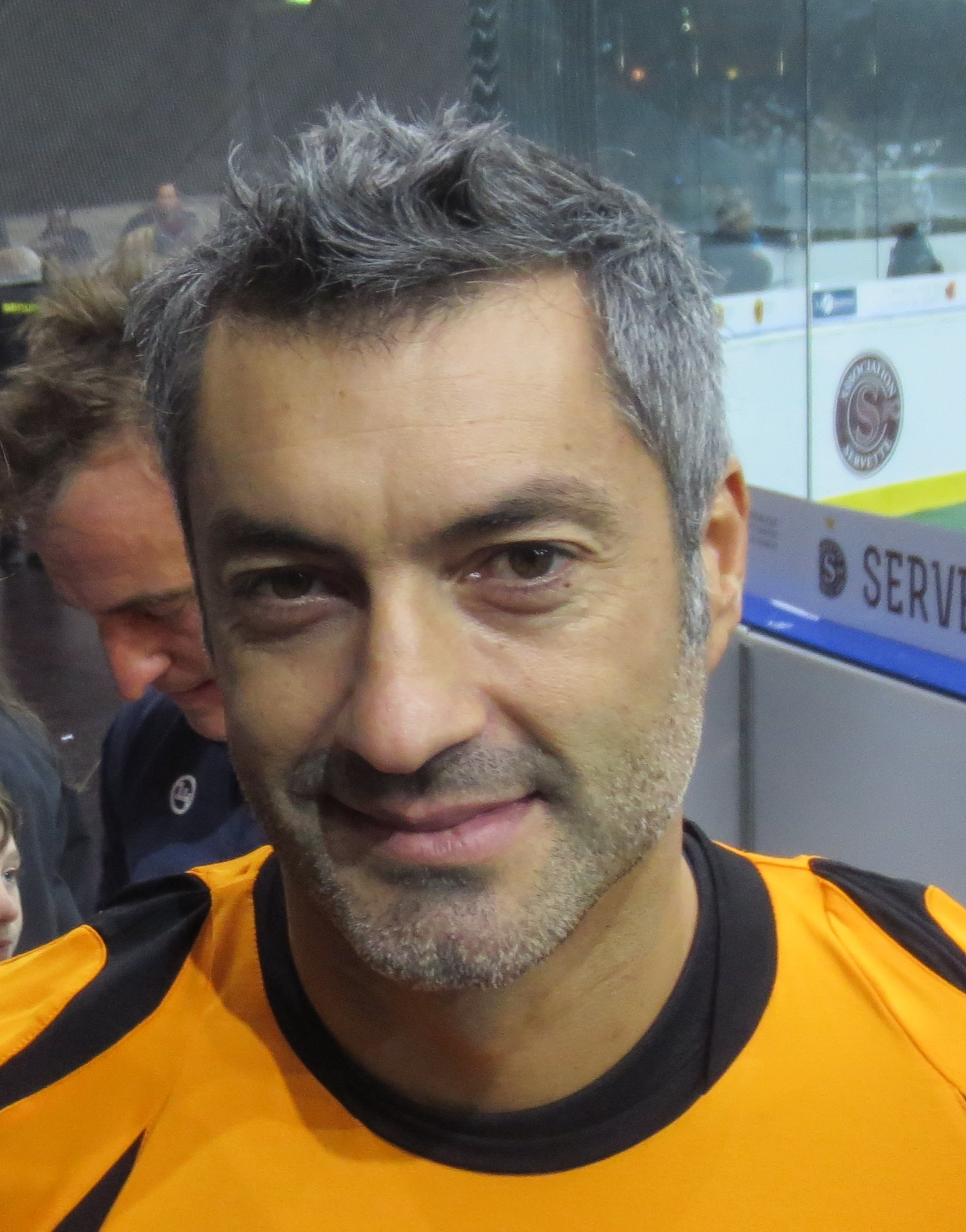
Former goalkeeper and captain Vítor Baía holds the club record for most appearances in international club competitions (99).

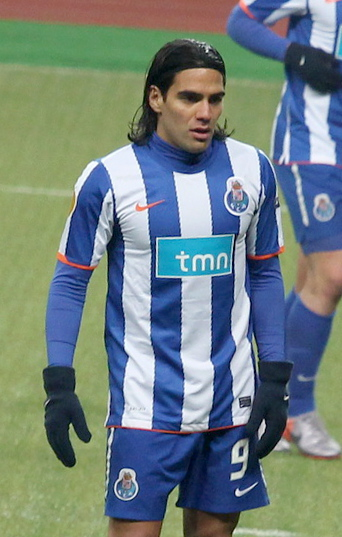
Radamel Falcao is the club's top goalscorer in international club competitions, with 22 goals.

- First match: 1–2 vs Athletic Bilbao, 1956–57 European Cup preliminary round (20 September 1956)
- First goal: José Maria, against Athletic Bilbao
- Biggest home win: 9–0 vs Rabat Ajax, 1986–87 European Cup first round (17 September 1986)
- Biggest away win: 8–1 vs Portadown, 1990–91 European Cup first round (3 October 1990)
- Biggest home loss: 0–5 vs Liverpool, 2017–18 UEFA Champions League round of 16 (14 February 2018)
- Biggest away loss: 1–6
  - vs AEK Athens, 1978–79 European Cup first round (13 September 1978)
  - vs Bayern Munich, 2014–15 UEFA Champions League quarter-finals (21 April 2015)
- Coach with most matches: Sérgio Conceição, 62
- Coach with most titles: Tomislav Ivić and José Mourinho, 2
- Player with most total appearances: Vítor Baía, 99
- Player with most consecutive appearances: Ljubinko Drulović, 50
- Player with most goals scored: Radamel Falcao, 22

=== By season ===
FC Porto record in international club football by season
Season	Competition	Pld	W	D	L	GF	GA	GD	Round
1956–57	European Cup	2	0	0	2	3	5	−2	PR
1959–60	European Cup	2	0	0	2	1	4	−3	PR
1962–63	Inter-Cities Fairs Cup	2	0	1	1	1	2	−1	R1
1963–64	Inter-Cities Fairs Cup	2	0	1	1	1	2	−1	R1
1964–65	Cup Winners' Cup	4	2	1	1	5	2	+3	R2
1965–66	Inter-Cities Fairs Cup	4	2	1	1	3	6	−3	R2
1966–67	Inter-Cities Fairs Cup	2	1	0	1	3	3	0	R1
1967–68	Inter-Cities Fairs Cup	2	1	0	1	3	4	−1	R1
1968–69	Cup Winners' Cup	4	2	1	1	5	7	−2	R2
1969–70	Inter-Cities Fairs Cup	4	2	1	1	4	2	+2	R2
1971–72	UEFA Cup	2	0	1	1	1	3	−2	R1
1972–73	UEFA Cup	6	3	0	3	10	7	+3	R3
1974–75	UEFA Cup	4	1	0	3	5	6	−1	R2
1975–76	UEFA Cup	6	4	1	1	15	5	+10	R3
1976–77	UEFA Cup	2	0	1	1	4	5	−1	R1
1977–78	Cup Winners' Cup	6	3	1	2	10	10	0	QF
1978–79	European Cup	2	1	0	1	5	7	−2	R1
1979–80	European Cup	4	2	1	1	3	2	+1	R2
1980–81	UEFA Cup	4	2	1	1	3	3	0	R2
1981–82	Cup Winners' Cup	6	2	2	2	8	6	+2	QF
1982–83	UEFA Cup	4	3	0	1	6	6	0	R2
1983–84	Cup Winners' Cup	9	5	1	3	11	9	+2	RU
1984–85	Cup Winners' Cup	2	1	0	1	4	4	0	R1
1985–86	European Cup	4	2	1	1	5	3	+2	R2
1986–87	European Cup	9	7	1	1	21	5	+16	W
1987	UEFA Super Cup	2	2	0	0	2	0	+2	W
1987	Intercontinental Cup	1	1	0	0	2	1	+1	W
1987–88	European Cup	4	2	0	2	8	4	+4	R2
1988–89	European Cup	4	2	0	2	5	7	−2	R2
1989–90	UEFA Cup	6	4	0	2	11	7	+4	R3
1990–91	European Cup	6	3	2	1	18	4	+14	QF
1991–92	Cup Winners' Cup	4	2	1	1	5	3	+2	R2
1992–93	UEFA Champions League	10	5	2	3	20	8	+12	GS
1993–94	UEFA Champions League	11	5	3	3	13	9	+4	SF
1994–95	UEFA Cup Winners' Cup	6	4	0	2	10	3	+7	QF
1995–96	UEFA Champions League	6	1	4	1	6	5	+1	GS
1996–97	UEFA Champions League	8	5	2	1	12	8	+4	QF
1997–98	UEFA Champions League	6	1	1	4	3	11	−8	GS
1998–99	UEFA Champions League	6	2	1	3	11	9	+2	GS
1999–2000	UEFA Champions League	14	7	2	5	19	17	+2	QF
2000–01	UEFA Champions League	2	0	1	1	0	1	−1	Q3
2000–01	UEFA Cup	10	4	4	2	11	6	+5	QF
2001–02	UEFA Champions League	16	6	3	7	24	19	+5	GS2
2002–03	UEFA Cup	13	8	2	3	29	10	+19	W
2003	UEFA Super Cup	1	0	0	1	0	1	−1	RU
2003–04	UEFA Champions League	13	7	5	1	20	12	+8	W
2004	UEFA Super Cup	1	0	0	1	1	2	−1	RU
2004	Intercontinental Cup	1	0	1	0	0	0	0	W
2004–05	UEFA Champions League	8	2	3	3	6	10	−4	R16
2005–06	UEFA Champions League	6	1	2	3	8	9	−1	GS
2006–07	UEFA Champions League	8	3	3	2	11	7	+4	R16
2007–08	UEFA Champions League	8	4	2	2	9	8	+1	R16
2008–09	UEFA Champions League	10	4	3	3	13	13	0	QF
2009–10	UEFA Champions League	8	5	0	3	10	9	+1	R16
2010–11	UEFA Europa League	17	14	1	2	44	16	+28	W
2011	UEFA Super Cup	1	0	0	1	0	2	−2	RU
2011–12	UEFA Champions League	6	2	2	2	7	7	0	GS
2011–12	UEFA Europa League	2	0	0	2	1	6	−5	R32
2012–13	UEFA Champions League	8	5	1	2	11	6	+5	R16
2013–14	UEFA Champions League	6	1	2	3	4	7	−3	GS
2013–14	UEFA Europa League	6	2	3	1	10	11	−1	QF
2014–15	UEFA Champions League	12	8	3	1	28	12	+16	QF
2015–16	UEFA Champions League	6	3	1	2	9	8	+1	GS
2015–16	UEFA Europa League	2	0	0	2	0	3	−3	R32
2016–17	UEFA Champions League	10	4	3	3	13	7	+6	R16
2017–18	UEFA Champions League	8	3	2	3	15	15	0	R16
2018–19	UEFA Champions League	10	6	1	3	20	15	+5	QF
2019–20	UEFA Champions League	2	1	0	1	3	3	0	PO
2019–20	UEFA Europa League	8	3	1	4	10	14	−4	R32
2020–21	UEFA Champions League	10	6	1	3	15	9	+6	QF
2021–22	UEFA Champions League	6	1	2	3	4	11	−7	GS
2021–22	UEFA Europa League	4	1	2	1	5	5	0	R16
2022–23	UEFA Champions League	8	4	1	3	12	8	+4	R16
2023–24	UEFA Champions League	8	5	0	3	16	9	+7	R16
2024–25	UEFA Europa League	10	3	3	4	16	15	+1	KPO
2025	FIFA Club World Cup	3	0	2	1	5	6	−1	GS
2025–26	UEFA Europa League	12	7	3	2	18	10	+8	QF
2026–27	UEFA Champions League	4	1	0	3	6	7	−1	LP
Total		466	216	98	152	699	533	+166	

=== Finals ===
Matches won after regular time (90 minutes of play), extra time (a.e.t.) or a penalty shoot-out (p) are highlighted in green, while losses are highlighted in red.

16 May 1984 Cup Winners' Cup	Juventus (Italy)	2–1	(Portugal) Porto	Basel, Switzerland
20:15 CEST (UTC+01:00)	Vignola 13'; Boniek 41'	Report	Sousa 29'	Stadium: St. Jakob Stadium; Attendance: 55,000; Referee: Adolf Prokop (East Germany)

27 May 1987 European Cup	Porto (Portugal)	2–1	(West Germany) Bayern Munich	Vienna, Austria
20:15 CEST (UTC+01:00)	Madjer 79'; Juary 81'	Report	Kögl 24'	Stadium: Prater Stadium; Attendance: 62,000; Referee: Alexis Ponnet (Belgium)

21 November 1987 Super Cup (1st leg)	Ajax (Netherlands)	0–1	(Portugal) Porto	Amsterdam, Netherlands
		Report	Barros 5'	Stadium: De Meer Stadion; Attendance: 27,000; Referee: Bob Valentine (Scotland)

13 December 1987 Intercontinental Cup	Porto (Portugal)	2–1 (a.e.t.)	(Uruguay) Peñarol	Tokyo, Japan
	Gomes 41'; Madjer 110'	Report	Viera 80'	Stadium: National Stadium; Attendance: 68,000; Referee: Franz Wöhrer (Austria)

13 January 1988 Super Cup (2nd leg)	Porto (Portugal)	1–0	(Netherlands) Ajax	Porto, Portugal
	Sousa 70'	Report		Stadium: Estádio das Antas; Attendance: 50,000; Referee: Aron Schmidhuber (West Germany)

21 May 2003 UEFA Cup	Celtic (Scotland)	2–3 (a.e.t.)	(Portugal) Porto	Seville, Spain
20:45 CEST (UTC+01:00)	Larsson 47', 57'	Report	Derlei 45+1' 115'; Alenichev 54'	Stadium: Estadio Olímpico de Sevilla; Attendance: 52,972; Referee: Ľuboš Micheľ (Slovakia)

29 August 2003 Super Cup	Milan (Italy)	1–0	(Portugal) Porto	Monaco
20:45 CEST (UTC+01:00)	Shevchenko 10'	Report		Stadium: Stade Louis II; Attendance: 16,885; Referee: Graham Barber (England)

26 May 2004 Champions League	Monaco (France)	0–3	(Portugal) Porto	Gelsenkirchen, Germany
20:45 CEST (UTC+01:00)		Report	Carlos Alberto 39'; Deco 71'; Alenichev 75'	Stadium: Arena AufSchalke; Attendance: 52,000; Referee: Kim Milton Nielsen (Denmark)

27 August 2004 Super Cup	Porto (Portugal)	1–2	(Spain) Valencia	Monaco
20:45 CEST (UTC+01:00)	Quaresma 78'	Report	Baraja 33'; Di Vaio 67'	Stadium: Stade Louis II; Attendance: 17,292; Referee: Terje Hauge (Norway)

12 December 2004 Intercontinental Cup	Porto (Portugal)	0–0 (a.e.t.) (8–7 p)	(Colombia) Once Caldas	Yokohama, Japan
19:10 JST (UTC+09:00)		Report		Stadium: International Stadium Yokohama; Attendance: 60,000; Referee: Jorge Larrionda (Uruguay)
	Penalties
	Diego (penalty scored); Carlos Alberto (penalty scored); Quaresma (penalty scored); Maniche (penalty missed); McCarthy (penalty scored); Costinha (penalty scored); J. Costa (penalty scored); R. Costa (penalty scored); Pedro Emanuel (penalty scored)		(penalty scored) Vanegas; (penalty scored) Alcázar; (penalty scored) Rojas; (penalty scored) De Nigris; (penalty missed) Fabbro; (penalty scored) Velásquez; (penalty scored) Díaz; (penalty scored) Cataño; (penalty missed) García

18 May 2011 Europa League	Porto (Portugal)	1–0	(Portugal) Braga	Dublin, Republic of Ireland
19:45 IST (UTC±00:00)	Falcao 44'	Report		Stadium: Aviva Stadium; Attendance: 45,391; Referee: Carlos Velasco Carballo (Spain)

26 August 2011 Super Cup	Barcelona (Spain)	2–0	(Portugal) Porto	Monaco
20:45 CEST (UTC+01:00)	Messi 39'; Fàbregas 88'	Report		Stadium: Stade Louis II; Attendance: 18,048; Referee: Björn Kuipers (Netherlands)

== Honours ==
FC Porto honours in international club competitions
Competition	Titles	Years
European Cup/UEFA Champions League	2	1987, 2004
UEFA Cup/UEFA Europa League	2	2003, 2011
UEFA Super Cup	1	1987
Intercontinental Cup	2	1987, 2004

== See also ==
- Football in Portugal
- S.L. Benfica in international football
- Sporting CP in European football
- S.C. Braga in European football

== Bibliography ==
- Bandeira, João Pedro (2012). Bíblia do FC Porto (in Portuguese). Lisbon: Prime Books. ISBN 9789896551544.
- Magalhães, Júlio (2004). Campeões, carago! (in Portuguese). Lisbon: Prime Books. ISBN 9728820313.
- Pinto da Costa, Jorge Nuno (2004). Largos Dias Têm 100 Anos (in Portuguese). Lisbon: Ideias & Rumos, Edições Lda. ISBN 9729940509.
- Tovar, Rui (2011). Almanaque do FC Porto 1893–2011 (in Portuguese). Alfragide: Caderno. ISBN 9789892315430.
