= 2011 UEFA Super Cup =

- Match programme cover
Barcelona	Porto
(Spain)	(Portugal)
2	0
- Date: 26 August 2011
- Venue: Stade Louis II, Monaco
- Man of the Match: Andrés Iniesta (Barcelona)
- Referee: Björn Kuipers (Netherlands)
- Attendance: 18,048
- Weather: Clear night 27 °C (81 °F); 67% humidity

The 2011 UEFA Super Cup was the 36th UEFA Super Cup, between the reigning champions of the two club competitions organised by the European football governing body UEFA: the UEFA Champions League and the UEFA Europa League. It took place at the Stade Louis II in Monaco on 26 August 2011. It was contested by the 2010–11 UEFA Champions League winners Barcelona of Spain and the 2010–11 UEFA Europa League winners Porto of Portugal. Barcelona won the title defeating Porto 2–0.

== Venue ==
The Stade Louis II in Monaco has been the venue for the UEFA Super Cup every year since 1998. Built in 1985, the stadium is also the home of AS Monaco, who play in the French league system.

== Teams ==
Team	Qualification	Previous participation (bold indicates winners)
(Spain) Barcelona	2010–11 UEFA Champions League winners	1979, 1982, 1989, **1992**, **1997**, 2006, **2009**
(Portugal) Porto	2010–11 UEFA Europa League winners	**1987**, 2003, 2004

== Match ==
=== Details ===
26 August 2011
20:45 CEST

Barcelona (Spain)	2–0	(Portugal) Porto
Messi 39'; Fàbregas 88'	Report

Stade Louis II, Monaco
Attendance: 18,048
Referee: Björn Kuipers (Netherlands)

**Barcelona**	**Porto**

GK	1	(Spain) Víctor Valdés
RB	2	(Brazil) Dani Alves
CB	14	(Argentina) Javier Mascherano
CB	22	(France) Eric Abidal
LB	21	(Brazil) Adriano		(substituted off) 63'
DM	15	(Mali) Seydou Keita
CM	6	(Spain) Xavi (c)
CM	8	(Spain) Andrés Iniesta	(yellow card) 51'
SS	10	(Argentina) Lionel Messi
RF	17	(Spain) Pedro		(substituted off) 80'
LF	7	(Spain) David Villa		(substituted off) 61'
Substitutes:
GK	36	(Spain) Oier
DF	24	(Spain) Andreu Fontàs
MF	4	(Spain) Cesc Fàbregas		(substituted on) 80'
MF	11	(Spain) Thiago
MF	16	(Spain) Sergio Busquets		(substituted on) 63'
MF	28	(Mexico) Jonathan dos Santos
FW	9	(Chile) Alexis Sánchez		(substituted on) 61'
Manager:
(Spain) Pep Guardiola

GK	1	(Brazil) Helton (c)
RB	21	(Romania) Cristian Săpunaru
CB	14	(Portugal) Rolando	(yellow card) 65' (yellow-red card) 86'
CB	30	(Argentina) Nicolás Otamendi
LB	13	(Uruguay) Jorge Fucile
DM	23	(Brazil) Souza		(substituted off) 77'
CM	6	(Colombia) Fredy Guarín	(yellow card) 82' (red card) 90'
CM	8	(Portugal) João Moutinho
RW	12	(Brazil) Hulk
LW	10	(Uruguay) Cristian Rodríguez	(yellow card) 30'	(substituted off) 69'
CF	11	(Brazil) Kléber		(substituted off) 77'
Substitutes:
GK	31	(Brazil) Rafael Bracalli
DF	4	(Brazil) Maicon
MF	7	(Argentina) Fernando Belluschi		(substituted on) 77'
MF	25	(Brazil) Fernando		(substituted on) 77'
MF	35	(Belgium) Steven Defour
FW	17	(Portugal) Silvestre Varela		(substituted on) 69'
FW	20	(Angola) Djalma
Manager:
(Portugal) Vítor Pereira

Man of the Match:
Andrés Iniesta (Barcelona)

Assistant referees:
Erwin Zeinstra (Netherlands)
Berry Simons (Netherlands)
Fourth official:
Bas Nijhuis (Netherlands)
Additional assistant referees:
Richard Liesveld (Netherlands)
Danny Makkelie (Netherlands)

**Match rules**

- 90 minutes
- 30 minutes of extra time if necessary
- Penalty shoot-out if scores still level
- Seven named substitutes
- Maximum of three substitutions

=== Statistics ===
First half
Statistic	Barcelona	Porto
Goals scored	1	0
Total shots	4	5
Shots on target	2	1
Saves	1	1
Ball possession	70%	30%
Corner kicks	3	3
Fouls committed	5	7
Offsides	5	0
Yellow cards	0	1
Red cards	0	0

Second half
Statistic	Barcelona	Porto
Goals scored	1	0
Total shots	5	3
Shots on target	3	1
Saves	1	2
Ball possession	70%	30%
Corner kicks	2	4
Fouls committed	4	11
Offsides	3	0
Yellow cards	1	3
Red cards	0	2

Overall
Statistic	Barcelona	Porto
Goals scored	2	0
Total shots	9	8
Shots on target	5	2
Saves	2	3
Ball possession	69%	31%
Corner kicks	5	7
Fouls committed	9	18
Offsides	8	0
Yellow cards	1	4
Red cards	0	2

== See also ==
- 2011–12 UEFA Champions League
- 2011–12 UEFA Europa League
- 2011–12 FC Barcelona season
- 2011–12 FC Porto season
- FC Barcelona in international football
- FC Porto in international football
