= 2004 UEFA Super Cup =

- Match programme cover
- Event: UEFA Super Cup
Porto	Valencia
(Portugal)	(Spain)
1	2
- Date: 27 August 2004
- Venue: Stade Louis II, Monaco
- Man of the Match: Rubén Baraja (Valencia)
- Referee: Terje Hauge (Norway)
- Attendance: 17,292

The 2004 UEFA Super Cup was the 29th UEFA Super Cup, an annual association football match contested by the winners of the previous season's UEFA Champions League and UEFA Cup competitions. The match was played at the Stade Louis II in Monaco on 27 August 2004 and contested by Porto of Portugal and Valencia of Spain.

Porto qualified as winners of the 2003–04 UEFA Champions League, having defeated Monaco of the French league 3–0 in the final, and were appearing in the Super Cup for the third time, following victory in 1987 and defeat in 2003. Meanwhile, Valencia were appearing as winners of the 2003–04 UEFA Cup, following victory over another French team, Marseille. It was their second Super Cup, having won in their only previous appearance in 1980.

Watched by a crowd of 17,292, a goal from Rubén Baraja gave Valencia the lead after half an hour, before Marco Di Vaio doubled their lead midway through the second half. Ricardo Quaresma scored for Porto in the 78th minute, but they were unable to find an equaliser and Valencia won the match 2–1 to win their second Super Cup.

== Background ==
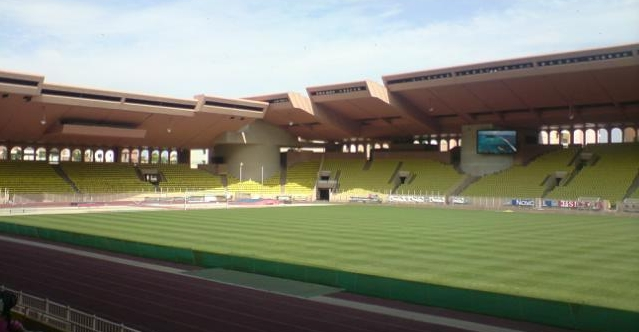
The Stade Louis II was the venue for the UEFA Super Cup from 1998 to 2012.

Porto qualified for the Super Cup as the reigning UEFA Champions League winners. They had won the 2003–04 UEFA Champions League beating Monaco 3–0 to win the competition for the second time. It would be Porto's third appearance in the competition was contesting the Super Cup for the third time. They won the competition in 1987 beating Ajax, while they lost in 2003, to Milan.

Valencia had qualified for the competition as a result of winning the 2003–04 UEFA Cup. They had beaten Marseille 2–0 in the final. Valencia's only previous appearance in 1980 resulted in victory, beating Nottingham Forest. Porto and Valencia had previously met each other in two European competition matches. In the second round of the 1989–90 UEFA Cup, Porto eliminated the Spanish team with a 5–4 aggregate score, as result of a 3–1 home win and a 2–3 away loss.

Soon after their European victories, Porto manager José Mourinho and Valencia manager Rafael Benítez parted with their clubs—Mourinho was hired by Chelsea, while Benitez took Liverpool's helm—and were therefore not able to lead their teams into the 2004 UEFA Super Cup. To replace them, Porto had hired Victor Fernández, and Valencia brought back Claudio Ranieri for a second spell. Besides the manager position, both clubs also went through significant squad changes. Porto sold Portuguese international playmaker Deco to Barcelona, and Portuguese defenders Ricardo Carvalho and Paulo Ferreira accompanied Mourinho to Chelsea. Relevant signings included Portuguese internationals Ricardo Quaresma, Hélder Postiga and Raul Meireles; Greek international and newly crowned UEFA Euro 2004 champion Giourkas Seitaridis; and Brazilian international and 2004 Copa América winner Diego. Ranieri brought to Valencia three Italian internationals: former Juventus striker Marco Di Vaio, and Lazio players Bernardo Corradi and Stefano Fiore.

Coming into the match after their previous week loss at the Supercopa de España, Valencia captain David Albelda admitted the team was "not at 100 per cent" and was still "hurt by the defeat", but this setback should help them "go into the match fully concentrated and go all out to win". On the other hand, Porto were coming from another Supertaça Cândido de Oliveira victory. The team's midfielder and captain Costinha assured that Valencia would be "an even tougher match" as it is "a very experienced team with good players". Remembering the Super Cup defeat against Milan in the previous year, Costinha showed no doubts: "... this time things are going to be different. I'm confident we can win".

Nonetheless, Porto had two key players ruled out due to injuries. Brazilian striker Derlei suffered a right knee ligament lesion during a friendly match on 15 August with city rivals Boavista, whereas Diego suffered a thigh injury during the Portuguese Super Cup match.

== Match ==
=== Details ===
27 August 2004
20:45 CEST

Porto (Portugal)	1–2	(Spain) Valencia
Quaresma 78'	Report	Baraja 32'; Di Vaio 67'

Stade Louis II, Monaco
Attendance: 17,292
Referee: Terje Hauge (Norway)

Porto	Valencia

GK	99	(Portugal) Vítor Baía
RB	22	(Greece) Giourkas Seitaridis
CB	2	(Portugal) Jorge Costa (c)	(yellow card) 52'
CB	7	(Portugal) Pepe
LB	8	(Portugal) Nuno Valente
RM	4	(Portugal) Hugo Leal		(substituted off) 61'
CM	6	(Portugal) Costinha
LM	18	(Portugal) Maniche
RF	41	(Portugal) Hélder Postiga
CF	77	(South Africa) Benni McCarthy	(yellow card) 42'	(substituted off) 72'
LF	19	(Brazil) Carlos Alberto
Substitutes:
GK	13	(Portugal) Nuno
DF	3	(Portugal) Pedro Emanuel
DF	5	(Portugal) Ricardo Costa
MF	10	(Portugal) Ricardo Quaresma	(yellow card) 72'	(substituted on) 61'
MF	12	(Portugal) César Peixoto		(substituted on) 72'
MF	33	(Portugal) Raul Meireles
FW	29	(Portugal) Hugo Almeida
Manager:
(Spain) Víctor Fernández

GK	1	(Spain) Santiago Cañizares
RB	23	(Spain) Curro Torres
CB	5	(Spain) Carlos Marchena
CB	17	(Spain) David Navarro	(yellow card) 16'
LB	15	(Italy) Amedeo Carboni	(yellow card) 90+2'
RM	19	(Spain) Francisco Rufete
CM	6	(Spain) David Albelda (c)	(yellow card) 40'
CM	8	(Spain) Rubén Baraja
LM	14	(Spain) Vicente
CF	11	(Italy) Marco Di Vaio		(substituted off) 77'
CF	9	(Italy) Bernardo Corradi		(substituted off) 87'
Substitutes:
GK	13	(Spain) Andrés Palop
DF	12	(Portugal) Marco Caneira
MF	7	(Italy) Stefano Fiore
MF	16	(Mali) Mohamed Sissoko
MF	21	(Argentina) Pablo Aimar		(substituted on) 87'
FW	18	(Spain) Xisco
FW	20	(Spain) Mista		(substituted on) 77'
Manager:
(Italy) Claudio Ranieri

Man of the Match:
Rubén Baraja (Valencia)

Assistant referees:
Steinar Holvik (Norway)
Ole Hermann Borgan (Norway)
Fourth official:
Tom Henning Øvrebø (Norway)

Match rules

- 90 minutes
- 30 minutes of extra-time if necessary
- Penalty shootout if scores still level
- Seven named substitutes, of which up to three may be used

== See also ==
- 2004–05 UEFA Champions League
- 2004–05 UEFA Cup
- 2004–05 FC Porto season
- 2004–05 Valencia CF season
- FC Porto in international football
- Valencia CF in European football
