= 2003 UEFA Super Cup =

- Match programme cover
- Event: UEFA Super Cup
Milan	Porto
(Italy)	(Portugal)
1	0
- Date: 29 August 2003
- Venue: Stade Louis II, Monaco
- Man of the Match: Andriy Shevchenko (Milan)
- Referee: Graham Barber (England)
- Attendance: 16,885

The 2003 UEFA Super Cup was played on 29 August 2003 between Milan of Italy and Porto of Portugal. Milan qualified by defeating Juventus in the 2003 UEFA Champions League Final, while Porto qualified by beating Celtic in the 2003 UEFA Cup Final. Milan won the match 1–0. After the match, defeated Porto manager José Mourinho said, "We leave here convinced we can go into the UEFA Champions League with the hope and certainty we can compete with any team." They finished the season as 2003–04 UEFA Champions League winners.

== Venue ==
The Stade Louis II in Monaco has been the venue for the UEFA Super Cup every year since 1998 until 2012. Built in 1985, the stadium is also the home of AS Monaco, who play in the French league system.

== Teams ==
Team	Qualification	Previous participation (bold indicates winners)
(Italy) Milan	2002–03 UEFA Champions League winners	1973, **1989**, **1990**, 1993, **1994**
(Portugal) Porto	2002–03 UEFA Cup winners	**1987**

== Match ==
=== Details ===
29 August 2003
20:45 CEST

Milan (Italy)	1–0	(Portugal) Porto
Shevchenko 10'	Report

Stade Louis II, Monaco
Attendance: 16,885
Referee: Graham Barber (England)

**Milan**	**Porto**

GK	1	(Brazil) Dida
RB	14	(Croatia) Dario Šimić
CB	13	(Italy) Alessandro Nesta
CB	3	(Italy) Paolo Maldini (c)
LB	26	(Italy) Giuseppe Pancaro
RM	10	(Portugal) Rui Costa		(substituted off) 85'
CM	8	(Italy) Gennaro Gattuso
CM	21	(Italy) Andrea Pirlo	(yellow card) 83'
LM	20	(Netherlands) Clarence Seedorf	(yellow card) 19'	(substituted off) 71'
CF	7	(Ukraine) Andriy Shevchenko		(substituted off) 76'
CF	9	(Italy) Filippo Inzaghi
Substitutes:
GK	77	(Italy) Christian Abbiati
DF	2	(Brazil) Cafu		(substituted on) 85'
DF	24	(Denmark) Martin Laursen
MF	23	(Italy) Massimo Ambrosini	(yellow card) 90+'	(substituted on) 71'
MF	27	(Brazil) Serginho
FW	11	(Brazil) Rivaldo		(substituted on) 76'
FW	15	(Denmark) Jon Dahl Tomasson
Manager:
(Italy) Carlo Ancelotti

GK	99	(Portugal) Vítor Baía
RB	22	(Portugal) Paulo Ferreira
CB	2	(Portugal) Jorge Costa (c)
CB	4	(Portugal) Ricardo Carvalho
LB	5	(Portugal) Ricardo Costa
DM	6	(Portugal) Costinha		(substituted off) 67'
CM	10	(Portugal) Deco
CM	18	(Portugal) Maniche	(yellow card) 90+'
RW	15	(Russia) Dmitri Alenichev		(substituted off) 75'
LW	11	(Brazil) Derlei
CF	77	(South Africa) Benni McCarthy		(substituted off) 60'
Substitutes:
GK	13	(Portugal) Nuno
DF	3	(Portugal) Pedro Emanuel
DF	17	(Portugal) José Bosingwa		(substituted on) 67'
DF	30	(Portugal) Mário Silva
MF	23	(Portugal) Pedro Mendes
MF	25	(Portugal) Ricardo Fernandes	(yellow card) 86'	(substituted on) 75'
FW	9	(Lithuania) Edgaras Jankauskas		(substituted on) 60'
Manager:
(Portugal) José Mourinho

Man of the Match:
Andriy Shevchenko (Milan)

Assistant referees:
David Babski (England)
David Bryan (England)
Fourth official:
Uriah Rennie (England)

**Match rules**

- 90 minutes
- 30 minutes of silver goal extra time if necessary
- Penalty shoot-out if scores still level
- Seven named substitutes, of which up to three may be used

=== Statistics ===
First half
Statistic	Milan	Porto
Goals scored	1	0
Total shots	5	1
Shots on target	1	0
Ball possession	38%	62%
Corner kicks	1	0
Fouls committed	13	9
Offsides	2	1
Yellow cards	1	0
Red cards	0	0

Second half
Statistic	Milan	Porto
Goals scored	0	0
Total shots	4	11
Shots on target	2	2
Ball possession	46%	54%
Corner kicks	1	2
Fouls committed	12	11
Offsides	3	2
Yellow cards	2	2
Red cards	0	0

Overall
Statistic	Milan	Porto
Goals scored	1	0
Total shots	9	12
Shots on target	3	2
Ball possession	42%	58%
Corner kicks	2	2
Fouls committed	25	20
Offsides	5	3
Yellow cards	3	2
Red cards	0	0

== See also ==
- 2003–04 UEFA Champions League
- 2003–04 UEFA Cup
- 2003–04 AC Milan season
- 2003–04 FC Porto season
- AC Milan in international football
- FC Porto in international football
