= 2016 Supercopa de España =

- Event: 2016 Supercopa de España
Sevilla	Barcelona
Copa del Rey	La Liga
0	5
- on aggregate

First leg
Sevilla	Barcelona
0	2
- Date: 14 August 2016
- Venue: Ramón Sánchez Pizjuán, Seville
- Referee: Jesús Gil Manzano
- Attendance: 36,311

Second leg
Barcelona	Sevilla
3	0
- Date: 17 August 2016
- Venue: Camp Nou, Barcelona
- Referee: Alejandro Hernández Hernández
- Attendance: 71,803

The 2016 Supercopa de España was a two-legged football match-up played in August 2016 between the champions of 2015–16 La Liga and 2015–16 Copa del Rey, Barcelona, and the runners-up of the 2015–16 Copa del Rey, Sevilla, making it a rematch of the 2016 Copa del Rey Final.

== Match details ==
All times are local (UTC+2).

=== First leg ===
The opening goal of the match came in the 54th minute when Denis Suárez chipped the ball into the penalty area for Arda Turan to chest back into the path of Luis Suárez, who finished with a low, right-footed bouncing shot from ten yards out. Munir scored the second in the 81st minute with a left-footed strike from the top of the penalty area following a low pass from Lionel Messi.

14 August 2016
22:00

Sevilla	0–2	Barcelona
	Report	L. Suárez 54'; Munir 81'

Ramón Sánchez Pizjuán, Seville
Attendance: 36,311
Referee: Jesús Gil Manzano

Sevilla	Barcelona

GK	1	(Spain) Sergio Rico
RB	25	(Brazil) Mariano
CB	23	(France) Adil Rami
CB	24	(Argentina) Gabriel Mercado	(yellow card) 32'
LB	18	(Spain) Sergio Escudero		(substituted off) 55'
DM	4	(Argentina) Matías Kranevitter		(substituted off) 69'
RM	20	(Spain) Vitolo (c)
CM	14	(Japan) Hiroshi Kiyotake
CM	22	(Italy) Franco Vázquez	(yellow card) 78'
LM	15	(France) Steven Nzonzi	(yellow card) 70'
CF	9	(Argentina) Luciano Vietto		(substituted off) 61'
Substitutes:
GK	31	(Spain) José Antonio Caro
MF	8	(Spain) Vicente Iborra
MF	10	(Ukraine) Yevhen Konoplyanka
MF	11	(Argentina) Joaquín Correa
MF	17	(Spain) Pablo Sarabia		(substituted on) 55'
MF	19	(Brazil) Ganso		(substituted on) 69'
FW	12	(France) Wissam Ben Yedder		(substituted on) 61'
Manager:
(Argentina) Jorge Sampaoli

GK	13	(Chile) Claudio Bravo
RB	20	(Spain) Sergi Roberto
CB	3	(Spain) Gerard Piqué
CB	14	(Argentina) Javier Mascherano
LB	24	(France) Jérémy Mathieu		(substituted off) 27'
CM	4	(Croatia) Ivan Rakitić
CM	5	(Spain) Sergio Busquets	(yellow card) 58'
CM	8	(Spain) Andrés Iniesta (c)		(substituted off) 36'
RW	10	(Argentina) Lionel Messi
LW	7	(Turkey) Arda Turan		(substituted off) 77'
CF	9	(Uruguay) Luis Suárez	(yellow card) 83'
Substitutes:
GK	25	(Spain) Jordi Masip
DF	19	(France) Lucas Digne		(substituted on) 27'
DF	22	(Spain) Aleix Vidal
DF	23	(France) Samuel Umtiti
MF	6	(Spain) Denis Suárez		(substituted on) 36'
MF	21	(Portugal) André Gomes
FW	17	(Spain) Munir		(substituted on) 77'
Manager:
(Spain) Luis Enrique

Assistant referees:
Ángel Nevado Rodríguez
José Manuel Fernández Miranda
Fourth official:
Hugo José López Puerta

=== Second leg ===
Arda Turan opened the scoring in the 10th minute with a low shot into the bottom right corner from six yards out after a pass from Messi. At the half-hour mark, Claudio Bravo saved a penalty from Vicente Iborra after Samuel Umtiti had blocked a shot that was ruled a handball. A minute before halftime, Sevilla almost got their first goal of the series with Gabriel Mercado's header hitting the crossbar. Turan then got his second one-minute into the second half with a lobbed right foot finish from outside the penalty area. Barcelona's third goal came in the 55th minute with a header scored by Messi after a cross from the left by Lucas Digne.

17 August 2016
23:00

Barcelona	3–0	Sevilla
Turan 10', 46'; Messi 55'	Report

Camp Nou, Barcelona
Attendance: 71,803
Referee: Alejandro Hernández Hernández

Barcelona	Sevilla

GK	13	(Chile) Claudio Bravo
RB	22	(Spain) Aleix Vidal
CB	14	(Argentina) Javier Mascherano
CB	23	(France) Samuel Umtiti	(yellow card) 32'
LB	19	(France) Lucas Digne		(substituted off) 61'
CM	6	(Spain) Denis Suárez		(substituted off) 73'
CM	5	(Spain) Sergio Busquets		(substituted off) 74'
CM	21	(Portugal) André Gomes
RW	10	(Argentina) Lionel Messi (c)
LW	7	(Turkey) Arda Turan
CF	17	(Spain) Munir
Substitutes:
GK	25	(Spain) Jordi Masip
DF	3	(Spain) Gerard Piqué
DF	18	(Spain) Jordi Alba		(substituted on) 61'
MF	4	(Croatia) Ivan Rakitić		(substituted on) 73'
MF	16	(Spain) Sergi Samper		(substituted on) 74'
MF	20	(Spain) Sergi Roberto
FW	9	(Uruguay) Luis Suárez
Manager:
(Spain) Luis Enrique

GK	1	(Spain) Sergio Rico
CB	32	(Spain) Diego González
CB	8	(Spain) Vicente Iborra (c)
CB	24	(Argentina) Gabriel Mercado
RM	25	(Brazil) Mariano
CM	19	(Brazil) Ganso		(substituted off) 57'
CM	4	(Argentina) Matías Kranevitter
CM	17	(Spain) Pablo Sarabia	(yellow card) 90'
LM	10	(Ukraine) Yevhen Konoplyanka
CF	11	(Argentina) Joaquín Correa		(substituted off) 73'
CF	12	(France) Wissam Ben Yedder		(substituted off) 63'
Substitutes:
GK	31	(Spain) José Antonio Caro
MF	14	(Japan) Hiroshi Kiyotake
MF	15	(France) Steven Nzonzi
MF	20	(Spain) Vitolo	(yellow card) 88'	(substituted on) 63'
MF	22	(Italy) Franco Vázquez		(substituted on) 57'
FW	9	(Argentina) Luciano Vietto		(substituted on) 73'
FW	36	(Spain) Juan Muñoz
Manager:
(Argentina) Jorge Sampaoli

Assistant referees:
Teodoro Sobrino Magán
José Enrique Naranjo Pérez
Fourth official:
Alexandre Alemán Pérez

== See also ==
- 2016–17 La Liga
- 2016–17 Copa del Rey
- 2016–17 FC Barcelona season
- 2016–17 Sevilla FC season
