= 2016–17 Sevilla FC season =

110th season in existence of Sevilla FC

Sevilla FC
2016–17 season
- President: José Castro Carmona
- Head coach: Jorge Sampaoli
- Stadium: Ramón Sánchez Pizjuán
- La Liga: 4th
- Copa del Rey: Round of 16
- Supercopa de España: Runners-up
- UEFA Champions League: Round of 16
- UEFA Super Cup: Runners-up
- Top goalscorer: League: Wissam Ben Yedder (16); All: Wissam Ben Yedder (24)
- Highest home attendance: 40,835 vs Barcelona (6 November 2016)
- Lowest home attendance: 10,930 vs Formentera (21 December 2016)
Home colours	Away colours	Third colours

The 2016–17 season was the 110th season in Sevilla Fútbol Club's history, and 16th consecutive season in La Liga. The team competed in La Liga, the Copa del Rey, the Supercopa de España, the UEFA Champions League and the UEFA Super Cup.

== Players ==
=== Squad information ===
As of 1 February 2017

Note: Flags indicate national team as defined under FIFA eligibility rules; some limited exceptions apply. Players may hold more than one non-FIFA nationality.

No.	Pos.	Nation	Player
1	GK	ESP	Sergio Rico
2	DF	FRA	Benoît Trémoulinas
3	DF	BRA	Mariano
4	MF	ARG	Matías Kranevitter (on loan from Atlético Madrid)
5	DF	FRA	Clément Lenglet
6	DF	POR	Daniel Carriço
7	MF	DEN	Michael Krohn-Dehli
8	MF	ESP	Vicente Iborra (captain)
9	FW	ARG	Luciano Vietto (on loan from Atlético Madrid)
10	MF	FRA	Samir Nasri (on loan from Manchester City)
11	MF	ARG	Joaquín Correa
12	FW	FRA	Wissam Ben Yedder
13	GK	ESP	David Soria

No.	Pos.	Nation	Player
14	MF	ARG	Walter Montoya
15	MF	FRA	Steven Nzonzi (third-captain)
16	FW	MNE	Stevan Jovetić
17	MF	ESP	Pablo Sarabia
18	DF	ESP	Sergio Escudero
19	MF	BRA	Ganso
20	MF	ESP	Vitolo
21	DF	ARG	Nicolás Pareja
22	MF	ITA	Franco Vázquez
23	DF	FRA	Adil Rami (vice-captain)
24	DF	ARG	Gabriel Mercado
30	FW	ESP	Carlos Fernández

== Transfers ==
=== Summer transfers ===
As of 30 August 2016

Player	Position	Club	Status
(Argentina) Éver Banega	MF	Internazionale	▼OUT ▼
(Spain) José Antonio Reyes	MF	Espanyol	▼OUT ▼
(Spain) Luismi	MF	Valladolid	▼OUT ▼
(Portugal) Beto	GK	Sporting CP	▼OUT ▼
(Poland) Grzegorz Krychowiak	MF	Paris Saint-Germain	▼OUT ▼
(Argentina) Federico Fazio	DF	Tottenham Hotspur (back from loan)	▼OUT ▼
(Italy) Marco Andreolli	DF	Internazionale (back from Loan)	▼OUT ▼
(Italy) Ciro Immobile	FW	Lazio	▼OUT ▼
(France) Kevin Gameiro	FW	Atlético Madrid	▼OUT ▼
(Spain) Coke	DF	Schalke 04	▼OUT ▼
(Spain) Fernando Llorente	FW	Swansea City	▼OUT ▼
(Uruguay) Sebastián Cristóforo	MF	Fiorentina (on loan)	▼OUT ▼
(Spain) Juan Muñoz	FW	Zaragoza (on loan)	▼OUT ▼
(Ukraine) Yevhen Konoplyanka	MF	Schalke 04 (on loan)	▼OUT ▼
(Spain) Pablo Sarabia	MF	Getafe	▲IN ▲
(Japan) Hiroshi Kiyotake	MF	Hannover 96	▲IN ▲
(Spain) Carlos Fernández	FW	Sevilla Atlético (promotion)	▲IN ▲
(Argentina) Matías Kranevitter	MF	Atlético Madrid (on loan)	▲IN ▲
(Argentina) Joaquín Correa	MF	Sampdoria	▲IN ▲
(Italy) Franco Vázquez	MF	Palermo	▲IN ▲
(Brazil) Ganso	MF	São Paulo	▲IN ▲
(Argentina) Luciano Vietto	FW	Atlético Madrid (on loan)	▲IN ▲
(France) Wissam Ben Yedder	FW	Toulouse	▲IN ▲
(Argentina) Gabriel Mercado	DF	River Plate	▲IN ▲
(Italy) Salvatore Sirigu	GK	Paris Saint-Germain (on loan)	▲IN ▲
(France) Samir Nasri	MF	Manchester City (on loan)	▲IN ▲

=== Winter transfers ===
As of 1 February 2017

Player	Position	Club	Status
(France) Timothée Kolodziejczak	DF	Borussia Mönchengladbach	▼OUT ▼
(Italy) Salvatore Sirigu	GK	Osasuna	▼OUT ▼
(Japan) Hiroshi Kiyotake	MF	Cerezo Osaka	▼OUT ▼
(France) Clément Lenglet	DF	Nancy	▲IN ▲
(Montenegro) Stevan Jovetić	FW	Internazionale (on loan)	▲IN ▲
(Argentina) Walter Montoya	MF	Rosario Central	▲IN ▲

== Pre-season & friendlies ==
Win Draw Loss

16 July 2016 Friendly	River Plate	1–3	Sevilla	Orlando, United States
20:00 (UTC-05:00)	Martínez (yellow card) 30'; Ponzio (yellow card) 61'; Simeone 74'	Report	Gameiro 3'; Vitolo (yellow card) 26'; Pareja (yellow card) 51'; Konoplyanka 60'; Nzonzi 66'	Stadium: Camping World Stadium; Referee: Esteban Rosano (United States)

19 July 2016 Supercopa Euroamericana	Santa Fe	1–2	Sevilla	Bay Lake, United States
20:00 (UTC-05:00)	Moya (yellow card) 35', (goal) 61'; Arboleda (yellow card) 36' (yellow-red card) 45+1'; Gordillo (yellow card) 62'	Report	Gameiro (yellow card) 16'; Konoplyanka 19'; Gameiro 21'; Pareja (red card) 27'; Llorente (yellow card) 59'; Soria (yellow card) 67'; Escudero (yellow card) 86'	Stadium: ESPN Wide World of Sports Complex; Attendance: 5,000; Referee: Vincent Apple-Chiarella (United States)

24 July 2016 Friendly	SV Sandhausen	1–2	Sevilla	Sandhausen, Germany
17:00 (UTC+02:00)	Wooten 9'	Report	Konoplyanka 40' (pen.); Sarabia 80'	Stadium: Hardtwaldstadion; Referee: Daniel Schlager (Germany)

28 July 2016 Friendly	Mainz 05	0–1	Sevilla	Mainz, Germany
19:30 (UTC+02:00)			Escudero 57'	Stadium: Bruchwegstadium; Referee: Patrick Alt (Germany)

30 July 2016 Friendly	St. Pauli	1–2	Sevilla	Hamburg, Germany
15:00 (UTC+02:00)	Avevor (yellow card) 29'; Bouhaddouz 35'		Vitolo 53'; Correa 68'; Lasso (yellow card) 87'	Stadium: Millerntor-Stadion; Referee: Patrick Ittrich (Germany)

2 August 2016 Friendly	Granada	0–2	Sevilla	Granada, Spain
21:00 (UTC+02:00)			Escudero (yellow card) 41'; Vietto 50'; Nzonzi 76'	Stadium: Los Cármenes

11 November 2016 Antonio Puerta Trophy	Sevilla	3–4	Boca Juniors	Seville
20:40 (UTC+02:00)	Nzonzi 30'; Kolodziejczak 84'; Vietto 88'	Report	Benedetto 24'; Pavón 38'; Tevez 59', 90+4'	Stadium: Ramón Sánchez Pizjuán; Referee: David Fernández Borbalán (Spain)

== Competitions ==
Win Draw Loss

=== Overall ===
Competition	Started round	Final position / round	First match	Last match
UEFA Super Cup	Final	Runners-up	9 August 2016	
Supercopa de España	Final	Runners-up	14 August 2016	17 August 2016
La Liga	Matchday 1	4th	20 August 2016	20 May 2017
UEFA Champions League	Group stage	Round of 16	14 September 2016	14 March 2017
Copa del Rey	Round of 32	Round of 16	30 November 2016	12 January 2017

Source: Competitions

=== Overview ===
Competition	Record							
Competition	Pld	W	D	L	GF	GA	GD	Win %
La Liga	38	21	9	8	69	49	+20	55.26
Champions League	8	4	2	2	9	6	+3	50.00
Super Cup	1	0	0	1	2	3	−1	0.00
Supercopa de España	2	0	0	2	0	5	−5	0.00
Copa del Rey	4	2	1	1	17	8	+9	50.00
Total	53	27	12	14	97	71	+26	50.94

Last updated: 20 May 2017
Source: Competitions

=== UEFA Super Cup ===
Sevilla secured their spot by winning the 2015–16 UEFA Europa League.

9 August 2016 Final	Real Madrid (Spain)	3–2 (a.e.t.)	(Spain) Sevilla	Trondheim, Norway
20:45 CET	Asensio 21', (yellow card) 86'; Carvajal (yellow card) 84', (goal) 119'; Ramos 90+3'; Rodríguez (yellow card) 93'	Report	Vitolo (yellow card) 39'; Vázquez 41'; Konoplyanka 72' (pen.); Kolodziejczak (yellow card) 90' (yellow-red card) 93'	Stadium: Lerkendal Stadion; Attendance: 17,939; Referee: Milorad Mažić (Serbia)

=== Supercopa de España ===
14 August 2016 First leg	Sevilla	0–2	Barcelona	Seville
22:00 CEST	Mercado (yellow card) 32'; Nzonzi (yellow card) 70'; Vázquez (yellow card) 78'	Report	L. Suárez 55', (yellow card) 83'; Busquets (yellow card) 58'; Munir 81'	Stadium: Ramón Sánchez Pizjuán; Attendance: 36,311; Referee: Jesús Gil Manzano

17 August 2016 Second leg	Barcelona	3–0 (5–0 agg.)	Sevilla	Barcelona
23:00 CEST	Turan 10', 46'; Umtiti (yellow card) 32'; Messi 55'	Report	Vitolo (yellow card) 88'; Sarabia (yellow card) 90'	Stadium: Camp Nou; Attendance: 71,803; Referee: Alejandro Hernández Hernández

=== La Liga ===
==== League table ====
Pos	Team	Pld	W	D	L	GF	GA	GD	Pts	Qualification or relegation
2	Barcelona	38	28	6	4	116	37	+79	90	Qualification for the Champions League group stage
3	Atlético Madrid	38	23	9	6	70	27	+43	78	Qualification for the Champions League group stage
4	Sevilla	38	21	9	8	69	49	+20	72	Qualification for the Champions League play-off round
5	Villarreal	38	19	10	9	56	33	+23	67	Qualification for the Europa League group stage (Note: Since the winners of the 2016–17 Copa del Rey, Barcelona, qualified for European competition based on league position, the spot awarded to the cup winners (Europa League group stage) was passed to the sixth-placed team and the spot awarded to the sixth-placed team (Europa League third qualifying round) was passed to the seventh-placed team.)
6	Real Sociedad	38	19	7	12	59	53	+6	64	Qualification for the Europa League group stage

Source: La Liga, Soccerway
Rules for classification: 1) Points; 2) Head-to-head points; 3) Head-to-head goal difference; 4) Goal difference; 5) Goals scored; 6) Fair-play points; 7) Play-off.

==== Matches ====
20 August 2016 1	Sevilla	6–4	Espanyol	Seville
22:15 (UTC+02:00)	Sarabia 15'; Vietto 22', 45+1', (yellow card) 64'; Mercado (yellow card) 41'; Vázquez 54'; Ben Yedder 66'; Kiyotake 74'	Report	Piatti 8'; Pérez 26', (yellow card) 38'; Sánchez 44'; Álvaro (yellow card) 45+2'; Gerard 79'	Stadium: Ramón Sánchez Pizjuán; Attendance: 29,399; Referee: González González

28 August 2016 2	Villarreal	0–0	Sevilla	Villarreal
22:15 CET	Soriano (yellow card) 48'	Report	Kolodziejczak (yellow card) 32'; Vitolo (yellow card) 49'; Sarabia (yellow card) 66'	Stadium: El Madrigal; Attendance: 18,740; Referee: Carlos del Cerro Grande

10 September 2016 3	Sevilla	2–1	Las Palmas	Seville
18:15 (UTC+02:00)	Vázquez (yellow card) 9'; Pareja (yellow card) 54'; Sarabia 89' (pen.); Fernández 90+4'	Report	Tana 16'; Livaja (yellow card) 45'; Mesa (yellow card) 54'; Bigas (yellow card) 56' (yellow-red card) 88'; Araujo (yellow card) 81'; García (yellow card) 90+4'	Stadium: Ramón Sánchez Pizjuán; Attendance: 34,112; Referee: Juan Martínez Munuera

17 September 2016 4	Eibar	1–1	Sevilla	Eibar
18:30 (UTC+02:00)	Capa (yellow card) 39'; Yoel (red card) 45'; Pedro León 64'; García (red card) 86'	Report	Vietto 27'; Correa (yellow card) 60'	Stadium: Ipurua Municipal Stadium; Attendance: 4,265; Referee: Álvarez Izquierdo

20 September 2016 5	Sevilla	1–0	Real Betis	Seville
22:00 (UTC+02:00)	Vázquez (yellow card) 16'; Nasri (yellow card) 32'; Mercado 51', (yellow card) 85'; Sarabia (yellow card) 78'; Pareja (yellow card) 85'	Report	Petros (yellow card) 2'; Pezzella (yellow card) 11'; Piccini (yellow card) 40'; Bruno (yellow card) 85'	Stadium: Ramón Sánchez Pizjuán; Attendance: 39,849; Referee: Xavier Estrada Fernández

24 September 2016 6	Athletic Bilbao	3–1	Sevilla	Bilbao
18:30 (UTC+02:00)	San José 26'; Aduriz (yellow card) 33', (goal) 90' (pen.); Balenziaga 66'; Williams (yellow card) 90+3'	Report	Nasri 55'; Mercado (yellow card) 56'; Sirigu (red card) 88'; Mariano (yellow card) 90+3'	Stadium: San Mamés; Attendance: 42,415; Referee: Alejandro Hernández Hernández

1 October 2016 7	Sevilla	2–1	Alavés	Seville
16:15 (UTC+02:00)	Mercado (yellow card) 33'; Ben Yedder 74', 90'; Mariano (yellow card) 90+6'	Report	Hernandez (yellow card) 37'; Alexis (yellow card) 41'; Marcos Llorente (yellow card) 65'; R. García (yellow card) 78'; M. García (yellow card) 82'; Laguardia 84'; Édgar (yellow card) 89'	Stadium: Ramón Sánchez Pizjuán; Attendance: 32,122; Referee: Antonio Mateu Lahoz

15 October 2016 8	Leganés	2–3	Sevilla	Madrid
13:00 (UTC+02:00)	Gabriel (yellow card) 45'; Timor 67', (yellow card) 86'; Szymanowski 69'	Report	Vázquez 25', (yellow card) 34'; Vietto (yellow card) 38'; Vitolo (yellow card) 45'; Nasri 58', (yellow card) 81'; Iborra (yellow card) 81'; Sarabia 85'	Stadium: Butarque; Attendance: 9,886; Referee: Ocón Arráiz

23 October 2016 9	Sevilla	1–0	Atlético Madrid	Seville
16:15 (UTC+02:00)	Rami (yellow card) 7'; Nzonzi (yellow card) 38', (goal) 73'; Nasri (yellow card) 45+1'; Mariano (yellow card) 81'	Report	Correa (yellow card) 42'; Gabi (yellow card) 44'; Koke (yellow card) 62' (yellow-red card) 77'	Stadium: Ramón Sánchez Pizjuán; Attendance: 34,571; Referee: Juan Martínez Munuera

29 October 2016 10	Sporting Gijón	1–1	Sevilla	Gijón
13:00 (UTC+02:00)	Isma (yellow card) 6'; Gómez 20', (yellow card) 26'; Cuéllar (yellow card) 23'; Čop (yellow card) 24'; Cases (yellow card) 71'; Amorebieta (yellow card) 83'	Report	Vietto 4'; Mercado (yellow card) 23'; Carriço (yellow card) 90+1'	Stadium: El Molinón; Attendance: 22,803; Referee: Ignacio Iglesias Villanueva

6 November 2016 11	Sevilla	1–2	Barcelona	Seville
20:45 CET	Vitolo 15'; Rami (yellow card) 26'; Mariano (yellow card) 50'; Nzonzi (yellow card) 82'; Carriço (yellow card) 85'	Report	Neymar (yellow card) 10'; Messi 43', (yellow card) 83'; Roberto (yellow card) 44'; L. Suárez 61', (yellow card) 88'; Digne (yellow card) 66'; Mascherano (yellow card) 90+1'	Stadium: Ramón Sánchez Pizjuán; Attendance: 40,835; Referee: Santiago Jaime Latre

19 November 2016 12	Deportivo La Coruña	2–3	Sevilla	A Coruña
13:00 (UTC+02:00)	Babel 1', (yellow card) 90+4'; Andone 42'; Tytoń (yellow card) 57'; Arribas (yellow card) 84'	Report	Nzonzi 44'; Pareja (yellow card) 76'; Vietto (yellow card) 83'; Vitolo 89'; Mercado 90+2'	Stadium: Riazor; Attendance: 20,096; Referee: Antonio Mateu Lahoz

26 November 2016 13	Sevilla	2–1	Valencia	Seville
20:45 (UTC+02:00)	Garay 53' (o.g.); Pareja 75'	Report	Munir 65'; Siqueira (yellow card) 77'	Stadium: Ramón Sánchez Pizjuán; Attendance: 31,901; Referee: Carlos del Cerro Grande

3 December 2016 14	Granada	2–1	Sevilla	Granada
13:00 (UTC+02:00)	Pereira 27', (yellow card) 28'; Silva (yellow card) 34'; Carcela (yellow card) 40'; Lombán 56', (yellow card) 90+4'; Márquez (yellow card) 81'	Report	Vázquez (yellow card) 44'; Iborra (yellow card) 64'; Ben Yedder 90+5' (pen.)	Stadium: Los Cármenes; Attendance: 15,832; Referee: José Luis González González

11 December 2016 15	Celta Vigo	0–3	Sevilla	Vigo
16:15 (UTC+02:00)	Aspas (yellow card) 41'; Hernández (yellow card) 79'; Guidetti (yellow card) 89'	Report	Mariano (yellow card) 48'; Iborra 51', 84', 90+2' (pen.); Vázquez (yellow card) 52'; Vitolo (yellow card) 55'	Stadium: Balaídos; Attendance: 19,350; Referee: Alberto Undiano Mallenco

18 December 2016 16	Sevilla	4–1	Málaga	Seville
20:45 (UTC+02:00)	Vietto 25', 28'; Pareja (yellow card) 29'; Ben Yedder 34'; Vitolo 35'; Nzonzi (yellow card) 58'; Rami (yellow card) 61' (yellow-red card) 61'	Report	Sandro 64'; Ontiveros (yellow card) 71'; Rosales (yellow card) 82'; Villanueva (yellow card) 90+2'	Stadium: Ramón Sánchez Pizjuán; Attendance: 30,324; Referee: Carlos Clos Gómez

7 January 2017 17	Real Sociedad	0–4	Sevilla	San Sebastián
20:45 (UTC+02:00)	Willian José (yellow card) 44'; Yuri (yellow card) 76'	Report	Vázquez (yellow card) 10'; Escudero (yellow card) 39'; Ben Yedder 25', 29', 83'; Sarabia 73'; Vitolo (yellow card) 79'	Stadium: Anoeta; Attendance: 22,374; Referee: Juan Martínez Munuera

15 January 2017 18	Sevilla	2–1	Real Madrid	Seville
20:45 (UTC+02:00)	Iborra (yellow card) 31'; Nzonzi (yellow card) 42'; Nasri (yellow card) 81'; Ramos 85' (o.g.); Jovetić 90+1'	Report	Ronaldo 67' (pen.); Marcelo (yellow card) 84'	Stadium: Ramón Sánchez Pizjuán; Attendance: 40,386; Referee: Hernández Hernández

22 January 2017 19	Osasuna	3–4	Sevilla	Pamplona
12:00 (UTC+01:00)	Fausto (yellow card) 2'; León 15'; Torres (yellow card) 18'; Iborra 63' (o.g.); Mario (yellow card) 81'; Riera (yellow card) 81'; Kodro 90+3'	Report	Nzonzi (yellow card) 19'; Rami (yellow card) 29'; Iborra 43', 65', (yellow card) 44'; Vázquez 80'; Sarabia 90+2'	Stadium: El Sadar; Attendance: 15,211; Referee: Estrada Fernández

29 January 2017 20	Espanyol	3–1	Sevilla	Barcelona
16:15 (UTC+01:00)	Reyes 4' (pen.); Martín (yellow card) 32'; Navarro 45'; Gerard 71', (yellow card) 81'	Report	Pareja (red card) 2'; Jovetić 20'; Escudero (yellow card) 76'; Sarabia (yellow card) 81'	Stadium: Cornellà-El Prat; Attendance: 22,974; Referee: Vicandi Garrido

5 February 2017 21	Sevilla	0–0	Villarreal	Seville
12:00 (UTC+01:00)	Nasri (yellow card) 25'; Mercado (yellow card) 44'	Report	Bruno (yellow card) 28'; Mario (yellow card) 50'	Stadium: Ramón Sánchez Pizjuán; Attendance: 33,401; Referee: Undiano Mallenco

12 February 2017 22	Las Palmas	0–1	Sevilla	Las Palmas
18:30 (UTC+01:00)	Lemos (yellow card) 84'; Mesa (yellow card) 87'	Report	Kranevitter (yellow card) 17'; Sarabia (yellow card) 28'; Iborra (yellow card) 77'; Correa 80', (yellow card) 80'	Stadium: Gran Canaria; Attendance: 27,843; Referee: Ricardo de Burgos Bengoetxea

18 February 2017 23	Sevilla	2–0	Eibar	Seville
20:45 (UTC+01:00)	Sarabia 30'; Escudero (yellow card) 66'; Mariano (yellow card) 69'; Vitolo 90+1'	Report	Arbilla (yellow card) 62'; Rico (yellow card) 65'; Capa (yellow card) 84'	Stadium: Ramón Sánchez Pizjuán; Attendance: 33,816; Referee: Álvarez Izquierdo

25 February 2017 24	Real Betis	1–2	Sevilla	Seville
16:15 (UTC+01:00)	Durmisi 36'; Toșca (yellow card) 45'; Piccini (yellow card) 87'; Martin (yellow card) 90+3'	Report	Nzonzi (yellow card) 35'; Sarabia (yellow card) 43'; Mercado 56'; Iborra 76'; Pareja (yellow card) 90'	Stadium: Benito Villamarín; Attendance: 41,263; Referee: Del Cerro Grande

2 March 2017 25	Sevilla	1–0	Athletic Bilbao	Seville
21:30 (UTC+01:00)	Iborra 14'; Jovetić (yellow card) 37'; Mariano (yellow card) 69'; Mercado (yellow card) 75'; Nasri (yellow card) 84'; Correa (yellow card) 90'; Kranevitter (yellow card) 90+2'	Report	Susaeta (yellow card) 70'; Etxeita (yellow card) 90+1'	Stadium: Ramón Sánchez Pizjuán; Attendance: 34,012; Referee: Ocón Arráiz

6 March 2017 26	Alavés	1–1	Sevilla	Vitoria-Gasteiz
20:45 (UTC+01:00)	Toquero (yellow card) 29'; Katai 75'; Hernandez (yellow card) 87'	Report	Lenglet (yellow card) 20'; Ben Yedder 23'; Kranevitter (yellow card) 31'; Iborra (yellow card) 68'; Vitolo (yellow card) 73'; Mariano (yellow card) 83'	Stadium: Mendizorrotza; Attendance: 18,479; Referee: Trujillo Suárez

11 March 2017 27	Sevilla	1–1	Leganés	Seville
16:15 (UTC+01:00)	Jovetić 43'; Sarabia (yellow card) 57'; Kranevitter (yellow card) 75'	Report	Gabriel 3', (yellow card) 60'; Mantovani (yellow card) 67'; Pérez (yellow card) 89'	Stadium: Ramón Sánchez Pizjuán; Attendance: 31,738; Referee: González González

19 March 2017 28	Atlético Madrid	3–1	Sevilla	Madrid
16:15 (UTC+01:00)	Godín 37', (yellow card) 66'; Filipe Luís (yellow card) 40'; Carrasco (yellow card) 55'; Griezmann 61'; Koke 77'; Torres (yellow card) 82'	Report	Escudero (yellow card) 23'; Sarabia (yellow card) 47'; Mercado (yellow card) 60'; Correa 85'	Stadium: Vicente Calderón Stadium; Attendance: 49,831; Referee: Gil Manzano

2 April 2017 29	Sevilla	0–0	Sporting Gijón	Seville
12:00 (UTC+01:00)	Pareja (yellow card) 59'; Nasri (yellow card) 75'; Mariano (yellow card) 83'	Report	Vesga (yellow card) 34'; Lillo (yellow card) 58'; Amorebieta (yellow card) 61'; Torres (yellow card) 78'	Stadium: Ramón Sánchez Pizjuán; Attendance: 31,315; Referee: Vicandi Garrido

5 April 2017 30	Barcelona	3–0	Sevilla	Barcelona
19:30 CEST	Piqué (yellow card) 15'; L. Suárez 25'; Messi 28', 33'; Busquets (yellow card) 71'; Rakitić (yellow card) 78'; Aleñá (yellow card) 84'	Report	Iborra (yellow card) 38'; Vitolo (yellow card) 57' (yellow-red card) 90+1'	Stadium: Camp Nou; Attendance: 85,511; Referee: Clos Gómez

9 April 2017 31	Sevilla	4–2	Deportivo La Coruña	Seville
18:30 (UTC+01:00)	Jovetić 1', (yellow card) 67'; Sarabia 9'; Escudero (yellow card) 27'; Correa 32'; Kranevitter (yellow card) 45'; Ben Yedder 88'	Report	Kakuta 4', 25'; Luisinho (yellow card) 26'; Arribas (yellow card) 60'; Joselu (yellow card) 87'	Stadium: Ramón Sánchez Pizjuán; Attendance: 33,022; Referee: Jaime Latre

16 April 2017 32	Valencia	0–0	Sevilla	Valencia
16:15 CEST	Lato (yellow card) 22'; Pérez (yellow card) 30'; Soler (yellow card) 50'	Report	Jovetić (yellow card) 65'; Iborra (yellow card) 70'	Stadium: Mestalla; Attendance: 36,748; Referee: González González

23 April 2017 33	Sevilla	2–0	Granada	Seville
21:00 CEST	Ganso 4', 46'; Correa (yellow card) 64'	Report	Pereira (yellow card) 32'; Samper (yellow card) 84'	Stadium: Ramón Sánchez Pizjuán; Attendance: 31,074; Referee: Trujillo Suárez

27 April 2017 34	Sevilla	2–1	Celta Vigo	Seville
20:30 CEST	Sarabia (yellow card) 27'; Correa 49'; Ben Yedder 79'	Report	Hernández (yellow card) 16' (yellow-red card) 56'; Mallo (yellow card) 38'; Aspas 53' (pen.); Cabral (yellow card) 61'	Stadium: Ramón Sánchez Pizjuán; Attendance: 25,995; Referee: Gil Manzano

1 May 2017 35	Málaga	4–2	Sevilla	Málaga
21:00 CEST	Fornals 38'; Camacho (yellow card) 39'; Ricca (yellow card) 49'; Sandro 51'; Llorente 77'; Juan Carlos 89', (yellow card) 90+3'	Report	Escudero (yellow card) 8'; Sarabia (yellow card) 18'; Vázquez (yellow card) 28', (goal) 30', 57'; Correa (yellow card) 39'; Iborra (yellow card) 76'	Stadium: La Rosaleda; Attendance: 22,971; Referee: Juan Martínez Munuera

5 May 2017 36	Sevilla	1–1	Real Sociedad	Seville
21:00 CEST	Lenglet (yellow card) 4'; Sarabia 41', (yellow card) 68'; Vázquez (yellow card) 44'; Mercado (yellow card) 58'	Report	Illarramendi (yellow card) 42'; Vela 61'; Canales (yellow card) 67'; I. Martínez (yellow card) 71'; Zurutuza (yellow card) 74' (yellow-red card) 79'	Stadium: Ramón Sánchez Pizjuán; Attendance: 28,607; Referee: González González

14 May 2017 37	Real Madrid	4–1	Sevilla	Madrid
20:00 CEST	Nacho 10', (yellow card) 80'; Ronaldo 23', 78'; Danilo (yellow card) 39'; Morata (yellow card) 56'; Vázquez (yellow card) 83'; Kroos 84'	Report	Jovetić 49'; Mercado (yellow card) 69'; Correa (yellow card) 80'	Stadium: Santiago Bernabéu; Attendance: 79,346; Referee: Undiano Mallenco

20 May 2017 38	Sevilla	5–0	Osasuna	Seville
21:00 CEST	Vitolo 10', 80'; Vázquez 20', 60'; Jovetić (yellow card) 29', (goal) 35'; Nzonzi (yellow card) 62'; Kranevitter (yellow card) 67'	Report	Oier (yellow card) 56'	Stadium: Ramón Sánchez Pizjuán; Attendance: 26,396; Referee: Del Cerro Grande

=== Copa del Rey ===
==== Matches ====
===== Round of 32 =====
30 November 2016 First leg	Formentera	1–5	Sevilla	Sant Francesc Xavier
19:00 UTC+1	Gabri 26'; Romero (yellow card) 79'	Report	Ben Yedder 1' (pen.), 74' (pen.); Correa 15', 29', 43'; Carmona (yellow card) 71'	Stadium: Municipal de Formentera; Attendance: 2,416; Referee: Juan Martínez Munuera

21 December 2016 Second leg	Sevilla	9–1 (14–2 agg.)	Formentera	Seville
19:00 UTC+1	Ganso 14'; Vietto 22', 43', 45'; Ben Yedder 24', 55', 88'; Sarabia 27', 77'	Report	Larrá (yellow card) 35'; Gabri 61'; Kiko (yellow card) 82'	Stadium: Ramón Sánchez Pizjuán; Attendance: 10,930; Referee: Iglesias Villanueva

===== Round of 16 =====
4 January 2017 First leg	Real Madrid	3–0	Sevilla	Madrid
21:15 UTC+1	Rodríguez 11', 44' (pen.); Varane 29'; Carvajal (yellow card) 42'; Marcelo (yellow card) 42'	Report	Iborra (yellow card) 24'; Ganso (yellow card) 26'; Mercado (yellow card) 43'; Vitolo (yellow card) 83'	Stadium: Santiago Bernabéu; Attendance: 78,969; Referee: Mateu Lahoz

12 January 2017 Second leg	Sevilla	3–3 (3–6 agg.)	Real Madrid	Seville
21:15 UTC+1	Mercado (yellow card) 7'; Danilo 10' (o.g.); Jovetić 53', (yellow card) 72'; Iborra (yellow card) 62', (goal) 77'	Report	Vázquez (yellow card) 13'; Asensio 48'; Kovačić (yellow card) 63'; Casilla (yellow card) 72'; Ramos 83' (pen.); Casemiro (yellow card) 84'; Marcelo (yellow card) 88'; Benzema 90+3'	Stadium: Ramón Sánchez Pizjuán; Attendance: 36,943; Referee: Undiano Mallenco

=== UEFA Champions League ===
==== Group stage ====
Pos	Team	Pld	W	D	L	GF	GA	GD	Pts	Qualification	JUV	SEV	LYO	DZG
1	(Italy) Juventus	6	4	2	0	11	2	+9	14	Advance to knockout phase	—	0–0	1–1	2–0
2	(Spain) Sevilla	6	3	2	1	7	3	+4	11	Advance to knockout phase	1–3	—	1–0	4–0
3	(France) Lyon	6	2	2	2	5	3	+2	8	Transfer to Europa League	0–1	0–0	—	3–0
4	(Croatia) Dinamo Zagreb	6	0	0	6	0	15	−15	0		0–4	0–1	0–1	—

Source: UEFA
Rules for classification: Group stage tiebreakers

14 September 2016 1	Juventus (Italy)	0–0	(Spain) Sevilla	Turin, Italy
20:45		Report	Nzonzi (yellow card) 37'; Iborra (yellow card) 41'; Rami (yellow card) 45+1'	Stadium: Juventus Stadium; Attendance: 33,261; Referee: Deniz Aytekin (Germany)

27 September 2016 2	Sevilla (Spain)	1–0	(France) Lyon	Seville, Spain
20:45	Ben Yedder 53'; Pareja (yellow card) 56'; Mercado (yellow card) 84'	Report	Gaspar (yellow card) 71'; Gonalons (yellow card) 72'; Cornet (yellow card) 86'	Stadium: Ramón Sánchez Pizjuán; Attendance: 36,741; Referee: Bas Nijhuis (Netherlands)

18 October 2016 3	Dinamo Zagreb (Croatia)	0–1	(Spain) Sevilla	Zagreb, Croatia
20:45	Stojanović (yellow card) 30'; Jonas (yellow card) 65'	Report	Vitolo (yellow card) 28'; Nasri 37'; Pareja (yellow card) 63'	Stadium: Stadion Maksimir; Attendance: 6,021; Referee: Michael Oliver (England)

2 November 2016 4	Sevilla (Spain)	4–0	(Croatia) Dinamo Zagreb	Seville, Spain
20:45	Vietto 31'; Escudero 66'; Nzonzi 80'; Ben Yedder 87'	Report	Stojanović (yellow card) 11' (yellow-red card) 45+1'; Pivarić (yellow card) 21'; Pavičić (yellow card) 28'	Stadium: Ramón Sánchez Pizjuán; Attendance: 35,215; Referee: Felix Zwayer (Germany)

22 November 2016 5	Sevilla (Spain)	1–3	(Italy) Juventus	Seville, Spain
20:45	Pareja 9'; Vázquez (yellow card) 31' (yellow-red card) 36'; Mercado (yellow card) 37'; Iborra (yellow card) 90+5'	Report	Mandžukić (yellow card) 25', (goal) 90+4'; Khedira (yellow card) 42'; Marchisio 45+2' (pen.); Evra (yellow card) 65'; Cuadrado (yellow card) 72'; Bonucci 84'	Stadium: Ramón Sánchez Pizjuán; Attendance: 38,942; Referee: Mark Clattenburg (England)

7 December 2016 6	Lyon (France)	0–0	(Spain) Sevilla	Décines-Charpieu, France
20:45	Gonalons (yellow card) 38'; Yanga-Mbiwa (yellow card) 53'	Report	Sarabia (yellow card) 32'; Nasri (yellow card) 36'; Mercado (yellow card) 73'	Stadium: Parc Olympique Lyonnais; Attendance: 52,423; Referee: Jonas Eriksson (Sweden)

==== Knockout phase ====
===== Round of 16 =====
22 February 2017 First leg	Sevilla (Spain)	2–1	(England) Leicester City	Seville
20:45	Sarabia 25'; Correa 62'; Escudero (yellow card) 77'; Carriço (yellow card) 90+2'	Report	Vardy 73'	Stadium: Ramón Sánchez Pizjuán; Attendance: 38,834; Referee: Clément Turpin (France)

14 March 2017 Second leg	Leicester City (England)	2–0 (3–2 agg.)	(Spain) Sevilla	Leicester
20:45	Morgan 27'; Albrighton 54'; Vardy (yellow card) 74'; Schmeichel (yellow card) 79'; Ndidi (yellow card) 84'; Mahrez (yellow card) 89'	Report	Nasri (yellow card) 18' (yellow-red card) 74'; Vitolo (yellow card) 59'	Stadium: King Power Stadium; Attendance: 31,520; Referee: Daniele Orsato (Italy)

== Statistics ==
=== Appearances and goals ===
No.	Pos	Nat	Player	Total		La Liga		Copa del Rey		Supercopa de España		Champions League		Super Cup	
No.	Pos	Nat	Player	Apps	Goals	Apps	Goals	Apps	Goals	Apps	Goals	Apps	Goals	Apps	Goals
Goalkeepers
1	GK	(Spain) ESP	Sergio Rico	47	0	35	0	1	0	2	0	8	0	1	0
13	GK	(Spain) ESP	David Soria	3	0	1	0	2	0	0	0	0	0	0	0
Defenders
3	DF	(Brazil) BRA	Mariano	43	0	29+2	0	1	0	2	0	6+2	0	1	0
5	DF	(France) FRA	Clément Lenglet	19	0	15+2	0	1	0	0	0	1	0	0	0
6	DF	(Portugal) POR	Daniel Carriço	10	0	6	0	1	0	0	0	0+2	0	1	0
18	DF	(Spain) ESP	Sergio Escudero	37	1	25+1	0	2	0	1	0	8	1	0	0
21	DF	(Argentina) ARG	Nicolás Pareja	34	2	27	1	0	0	0	0	6	1	1	0
23	DF	(France) FRA	Adil Rami	33	0	21	0	3	0	1	0	7	0	0+1	0
24	DF	(Argentina) ARG	Gabriel Mercado	40	3	26+3	3	2	0	2	0	7	0	0	0
26	DF	(Spain) ESP	David Carmona	1	0	0	0	1	0	0	0	0	0	0	0
32	DF	(Spain) ESP	Diego González	6	0	0+3	0	1+1	0	1	0	0	0	0	0
Midfielders
4	MF	(Argentina) ARG	Matías Kranevitter	32	0	14+7	0	3+1	0	2	0	2+2	0	0+1	0
7	MF	(Denmark) DEN	Michael Krohn-Dehli	2	0	2	0	0	0	0	0	0	0	0	0
8	MF	(Spain) ESP	Vicente Iborra	44	8	12+19	7	4	1	1	0	4+3	0	1	0
10	MF	(France) FRA	Samir Nasri	30	3	22+1	2	1+1	0	0	0	5	1	0	0
11	MF	(Argentina) ARG	Joaquín Correa	34	8	15+11	4	4	3	1	0	1+2	1	0	0
14	MF	(Argentina) ARG	Walter Montoya	4	0	1+3	0	0	0	0	0	0	0	0	0
15	MF	(France) FRA	Steven Nzonzi	46	3	34+1	2	1	0	1	0	8	1	1	0
17	MF	(Spain) ESP	Pablo Sarabia	46	11	22+12	8	2+1	2	1+1	0	4+3	1	0	0
19	MF	(Brazil) BRA	Ganso	16	3	5+5	2	3	1	1+1	0	1	0	0	0
20	MF	(Spain) ESP	Vitolo	43	6	25+5	6	1+1	0	1+1	0	8	0	1	0
22	MF	(Italy) ITA	Franco Vázquez	38	8	26+4	7	0	0	1+1	0	5	0	1	1
28	MF	(Spain) ESP	Borja Lasso	2	0	0	0	0+2	0	0	0	0	0	0	0
Forwards
9	FW	(Argentina) ARG	Luciano Vietto	31	10	14+7	6	2+1	3	1+1	0	4	1	1	0
12	FW	(France) FRA	Wissam Ben Yedder	38	18	20+11	11	1	5	1+1	0	4	2	0	0
16	FW	(Montenegro) MNE	Stevan Jovetić	24	7	12+9	6	1	1	0	0	2	0	0	0
30	FW	(Spain) ESP	Carlos Fernández	3	1	1+2	1	0	0	0	0	0	0	0	0
Players who have made an appearance this season but have left the club
25	GK	(Italy) ITA	Salvatore Sirigu	3	0	2	0	1	0	0	0	0	0	0	0
5	DF	(France) FRA	Timothée Kolodziejczak	9	0	3+2	0	2	0	0	0	0+1	0	1	0
10	MF	(Ukraine) UKR	Yevhen Konoplyanka	2	1	0	0	0	0	1	0	0	0	0+1	1
14	MF	(Japan) JPN	Hiroshi Kiyotake	9	1	3+1	1	2	0	1	0	0+1	0	1	0

=== Goalscorers ===
Rank	Player	La Liga	Copa del Rey	Supercopa de España	Champions League	Super Cup	Total
1	(France) Wissam Ben Yedder	16	3	0	4	1	24
2	(Spain) Pablo Sarabia	9	2	1	1	0	13
3	(Argentina) Luciano Vietto	6	3	0	1	0	10
4	(Argentina) Joaquín Correa	4	3	0	1	0	8
4	(Spain) Vicente Iborra	7	1	0	0	0	8
4	(Italy) Franco Vázquez	7	0	0	0	1	8
7	(Montenegro) Stevan Jovetić	6	1	0	0	0	7
8	(Spain) Vitolo	6	0	0	0	0	6
9	(Brazil) Ganso	2	1	0	0	0	3
9	(Argentina) Gabriel Mercado	3	0	0	0	0	3
9	(France) Samir Nasri	2	0	0	1	0	3
9	(France) Steven Nzonzi	2	0	0	1	0	3
13	(Argentina) Nicolás Pareja	1	0	0	1	0	2
14	(Spain) Sergio Escudero	0	0	0	1	0	1
14	(Spain) Carlos Fernández	1	0	0	0	0	1
14	(Japan) Hiroshi Kiyotake	1	0	0	0	0	1
14	(Ukraine) Yevhen Konoplyanka	0	0	0	0	1	1
Own goals		2	1	0	0	1	3
Totals		69	17	0	9	2	97
