= Vicente Iborra =

Spanish footballer

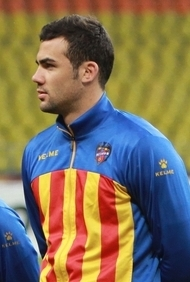
- Iborra with Levante in 2013

Personal information
- Full name: Vicente Iborra de la Fuente
- Date of birth: 16 January 1988 (age 38)
- Place of birth: Moncada, Spain
- Height: 1.90 m (6 ft 3 in)
- Position: Defensive midfielder

Team information
- Current team: Levante (assistant)

Youth career
- Levante

Senior career*
Years	Team	Apps	(Gls)
2007–2008	Levante B	17	(4)
2008–2013	Levante	165	(8)
2013–2017	Sevilla	113	(24)
2017–2019	Leicester City	27	(3)
2019–2023	Villarreal	86	(4)
2022–2023	→ Levante (loan)	36	(2)
2023–2024	Olympiacos	15	(1)
2024–2025	Levante	26	(1)
Total		485	(47)

Managerial career
- 2025–: Levante (assistant)
- * Club domestic league appearances and goals

Vicente Iborra de la Fuente (Spanish pronunciation: [biˈθentejˈβora]; born 16 January 1988) is a Spanish former professional footballer who played as a defensive midfielder. He is currently assistant manager of La Liga club Levante.

He played 297 games in La Liga over 12 seasons, scoring a total of 33 goals for Levante, Sevilla and Villarreal, winning the Europa League three times with the second club and once with the third. He also spent two years in the English Premier League with Leicester City, having signed in July 2017.

== Club career ==
=== Levante ===
Born in Moncada, Valencian Community, Iborra was a product of Levante UD's youth system. He made his first-team debut during the 2007–08 season, as the club's severe financial problems prompted the exit of several players. After appearing in a Copa del Rey match against Getafe CF on 9 January 2008, he played in La Liga against Real Madrid four days later (0–2 home loss).

On 30 March 2008, Iborra scored his first Levante goal, a last-minute effort in a 2–1 defeat at UD Almería. In the 2009–10 campaign, as the side returned to the top flight after a two-year absence, he was one of the team's most used players — 36 games, 2,640 minutes — scoring once.

=== Sevilla ===
Iborra joined fellow top-tier club Sevilla FC on 16 August 2013, after agreeing to a five-year contract. He finished his debut season with 41 matches and four goals in all competitions, including 12/1 in the UEFA Europa League which his side won.

In 2014–15, Iborra was often deployed in a more attacking midfield role by manager Unai Emery, and responded by scoring nine goals overall. On 24 September 2016 he filled in as the goalkeeper for the final two minutes away to Athletic Bilbao when Salvatore Sirigu was sent off, conceding a penalty from Aritz Aduriz in a 3–1 loss.

Sunderland agreed to pay Sevilla £7 million for Iborra, but called it off on 30 August 2016 as the summer transfer window came to a close. Under new coach Jorge Sampaoli he started the new season as a reserve. On 11 December, after replacing the injured Nicolás Pareja at half-time of the away fixture against RC Celta de Vigo, he scored a hat-trick which included a late penalty in a 3–0 win.

=== Leicester City ===
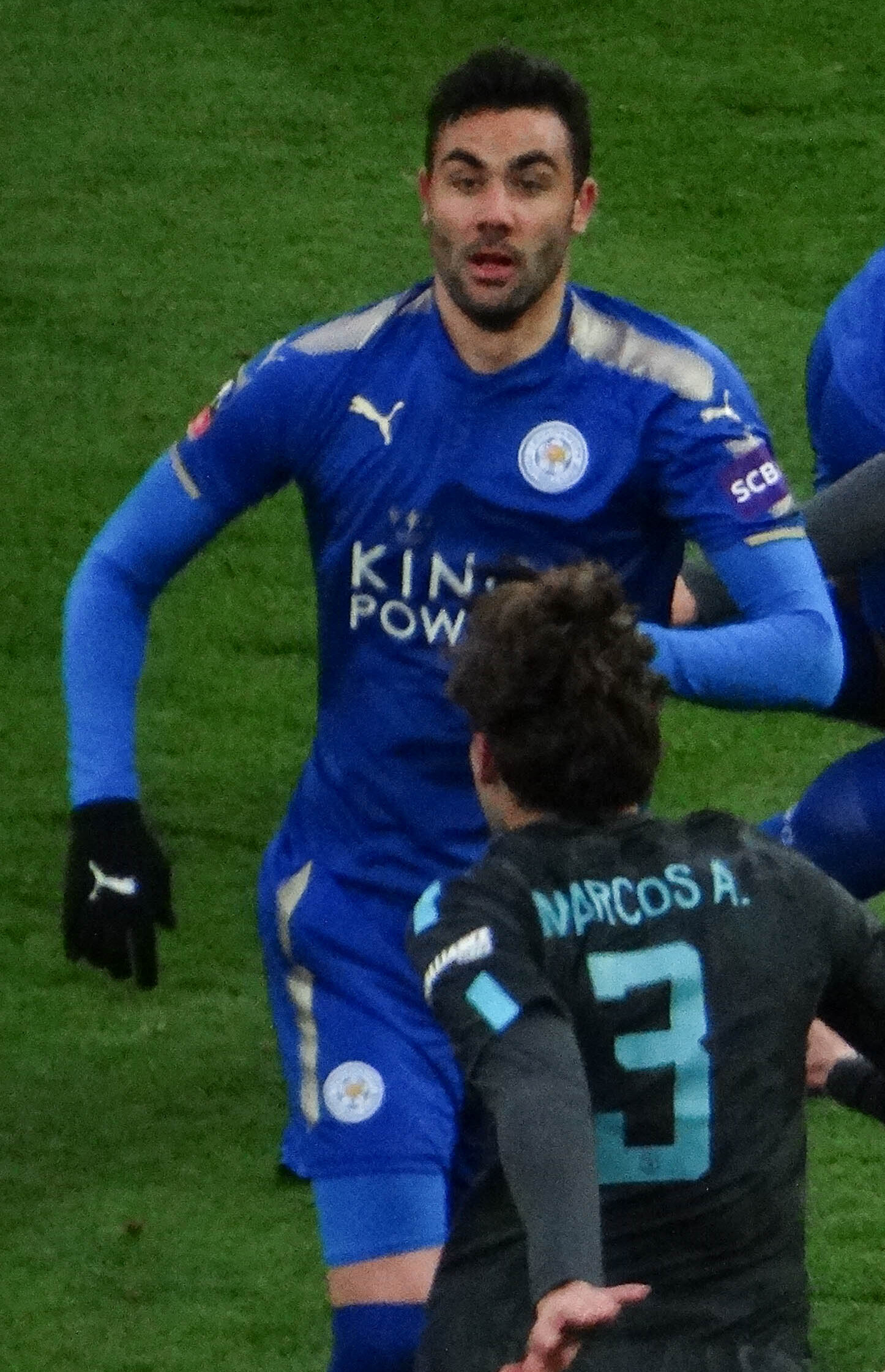
Iborra playing for Leicester City in an FA Cup match against Chelsea in March 2018

On 6 July 2017, Leicester City announced they had signed Iborra on a four-year contract for £15 million. After picking up a groin injury during pre-season, he did not make his debut until 19 September, when he played the whole of a 2–0 home win over Liverpool in the EFL Cup and provided the assist for Shinji Okazaki's goal. His first Premier League appearance was on 30 September as he played the second half of a 0–0 draw away to AFC Bournemouth, and he scored his first goal in the latter competition on 4 November in a 2–2 draw at Stoke City.

=== Villarreal ===
On 7 January 2019, Iborra joined Villarreal CF on a four-and-a-half-year deal for a reported fee of £9 million; he cited the failure of his family to adjust to life in England as the main reason for his departure. He appeared in 34 games in his first full season for the fifth-placed club, scoring in a 2–1 away loss against Real Madrid.

Iborra ruptured his left anterior cruciate ligament against Real Betis on 13 December 2020, and was sidelined for the rest of the campaign. He returned to Levante in July 2022, in a season-long loan.

=== Olympiacos ===
On 11 July 2023, Olympiacos F.C. announced the signing of Iborra after his contract with Villarreal expired. He totalled 30 matches in his only season in the Super League Greece, winning the UEFA Conference League.

=== Later career ===
Iborra returned to Levante for a third spell on 9 July 2024, with the 36-year-old agreeing to a one-year deal with the option of a further season. He made 26 appearances during the campaign and totalled 951 minutes, achieving top-tier promotion as champion while scoring once.

In July 2025, Iborra announced his retirement. He was immediately named Julián Calero's assistant at the same club.

== Career statistics ==
Appearances and goals by club, season and competition
Club	Season	League			National cup (Note: Includes Copa del Rey, FA Cup)		League cup (Note: Includes EFL Cup)		Europe		Other		Total	
Club	Season	Division	Apps	Goals	Apps	Goals	Apps	Goals	Apps	Goals	Apps	Goals	Apps	Goals
Levante B	2007–08	Segunda División B	17	4	—		—		—		—		17	4
Levante	2007–08	La Liga	14	1	2	0	—		—		—		16	1
Levante	2008–09	Segunda División	31	2	1	0	—		—		—		32	2
Levante	2009–10	Segunda División	36	1	0	0	—		—		—		36	1
Levante	2010–11	La Liga	16	0	0	0	—		—		—		16	0
Levante	2011–12	La Liga	33	0	6	1	—		—		—		39	1
Levante	2012–13	La Liga	35	4	2	1	—		12 (Note: Appearances in UEFA Europa League)	2	—		49	7
Levante	Total		165	8	11	2	—		12	2	—		188	12
Sevilla	2013–14	La Liga	27	3	2	0	—		12	1	—		41	4
Sevilla	2014–15	La Liga	26	7	4	0	—		11	2	—		41	9
Sevilla	2015–16	La Liga	29	7	7	1	—		10 (Note: Three appearances and one goal in UEFA Champions League, seven appearances in UEFA Europa League)	1	1 (Note: Appearance in UEFA Super Cup)	0	47	9
Sevilla	2016–17	La Liga	31	7	4	1	—		7 (Note: Appearances in UEFA Champions League)	0	2 (Note: Appearance in UEFA Super Cup, appearance in Supercopa de España)	0	44	8
Sevilla	Total		113	24	17	2	—		40	4	3	0	173	30
Leicester City	2017–18	Premier League	19	3	4	0	3	0	—		—		26	3
Leicester City	2018–19	Premier League	8	0	0	0	3	1	—		—		11	1
Leicester City	Total		27	3	4	0	6	1	0	0	0	0	37	4
Villarreal	2018–19	La Liga	19	3	1	0	—		5	1	—		25	4
Villarreal	2019–20	La Liga	34	1	3	0	—		—		—		37	1
Villarreal	2020–21	La Liga	13	0	0	0	—		5	0	—		18	0
Villarreal	2021–22	La Liga	20	0	3	0	—		1	0	0	0	24	0
Villarreal	Total		86	4	7	0	—		11	1	0	0	104	5
Levante (loan)	2022–23	Segunda División	36	2	3	0	—		—		4 (Note: Appearances in La Liga play-offs)	0	43	2
Olympiacos	2023–24	Super League Greece	15	1	1	0	—		14 (Note: Five appearances in UEFA Europa League, nine appearances UEFA Conference League)	0	—		30	1
Levante	2024–25	Segunda División	26	1	0	0	—		—		—		26	1
Career total			485	47	43	4	6	1	77	7	7	0	618	59

== Honours ==
Sevilla

- UEFA Europa League: 2013–14, 2014–15, 2015–16
- Copa del Rey runner-up: 2015–16
- UEFA Super Cup runner-up: 2014, 2015, 2016

Villarreal

- UEFA Europa League: 2020–21
- UEFA Super Cup runner-up: 2021

Olympiacos

- UEFA Conference League: 2023–24

Levante

- Segunda División: 2024–25
