= Joaquín Correa =

Argentine footballer (born 1994)

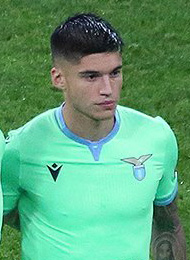
- Correa with Lazio in 2020

Personal information
- Full name: Carlos Joaquín Correa
- Date of birth: 13 August 1994 (age 32)
- Place of birth: Juan Bautista Alberdi, Argentina
- Height: 1.89 m (6 ft 2 in)
- Position: Forward

Team information
- Current team: Estudiantes de La Plata
- Number: 32

Youth career
- 2000–2005: River Plate
- 2005–2006: Renato Cesarini
- 2006–2012: Estudiantes

Senior career*
Years	Team	Apps	(Gls)
2012–2014	Estudiantes	53	(3)
2015–2016	Sampdoria	31	(3)
2016–2018	Sevilla	47	(5)
2018–2022	Lazio	92	(22)
2021–2022	→ Inter Milan (loan)	26	(6)
2022–2025	Inter Milan	45	(5)
2023–2024	→ Marseille (loan)	12	(0)
2025–2026	Botafogo	26	(3)
2026–	Estudiantes	8	(0)

International career
2017–2022	Argentina	20	(4)
Medal record
Men's football
Representing Argentina
Copa América
Winner	2021 Brazil
CONMEBOL–UEFA Cup of Champions
Winner	2022 England
- * Club domestic league appearances and goals as of 17:41, 21 November 2026 (UTC)

Carlos Joaquín Correa (Spanish pronunciation: [xoaˈkiŋ koˈrea]; (Note: In isolation, Joaquín is pronounced [xoaˈkin].) born 13 August 1994), nicknamed "El Tucu" (derived from his home province of Tucumán), is an Argentine professional footballer who plays as a forward for Estudiantes.

== Club career ==
=== Estudiantes ===
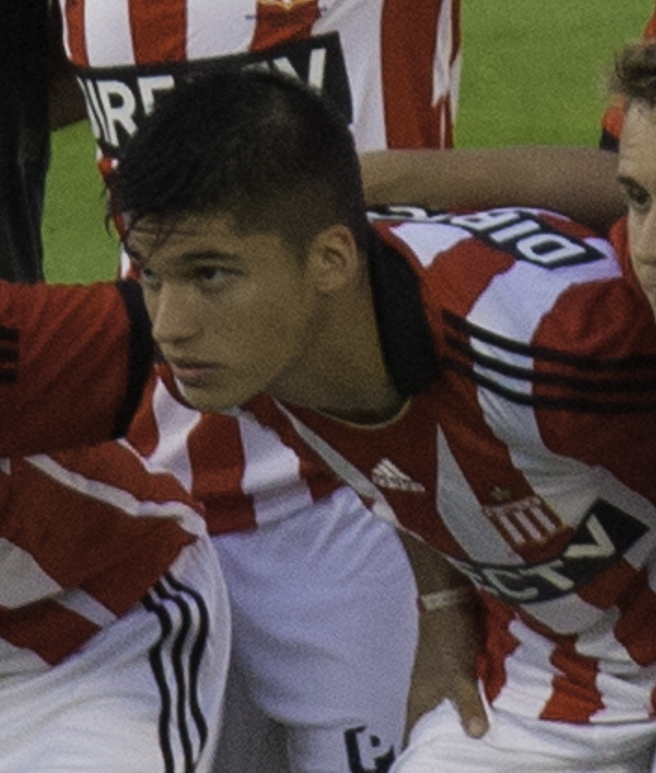
Correa with Estudiantes in 2014

Born in Juan Bautista Alberdi, Tucumán, Correa represented River Plate, Renato Cesarini and Estudiantes as a youth. He made his first team debut with the latter on 19 May 2012, coming on for Duván Zapata in a 0–3 away win against Banfield for the Primera División championship.

Correa scored his first professional goal on 10 May 2014, netting the first in a 3–0 home win against San Lorenzo. He also featured regularly for the side during the year's Copa Sudamericana, scoring in a 2–1 home win against Peñarol on 15 October.

=== Sampdoria ===
On 16 December 2014, Correa transferred to Serie A club Sampdoria for a US$10 million fee. He signed a four-and-a-half-year contract the following 9 January, receiving the number 8 shirt.

Correa made his debut for Samp on 15 February 2015, starting in a 1–2 loss at Chievo. Rarely used during his first season, he switched his number to 10 ahead of the 2015–16 campaign, and started to feature more regularly.

Correa scored his first goal abroad on 17 January 2016 in a 1–2 loss at Carpi. In the following two matchdays, he scored back-to-back goals against Napoli (2–4 home loss) and Bologna (2–3 away loss), and finished the season with three goals as his side achieved a disappointing 15th place.

=== Sevilla ===
On 10 July 2016, La Liga side Sevilla reached an agreement with Sampdoria for the transfer of Correa for a rumoured €13 million fee. Presented by the club two days later, he made his debut for the club on 17 August, starting in a 0–3 away loss against Barcelona for the second leg of the 2016 Supercopa de España.

Correa made his debut in the main category of Spanish football on 20 August 2016, replacing compatriot Luciano Vietto in a 6–4 home win against Espanyol. On 22 February 2017, he scored his first UEFA Champions League goal in a 2–1 win over Leicester City in the 2016–17 UEFA Champions League round of 16.

On 17 September 2017, he scored the equalizing goal in a 2–2 draw against Liverpool at Anfield in the 2017–18 UEFA Champions League. On 11 April 2018, he committed a horror challenge on Javi Martínez in added time against Bayern Munich in the quarter-finals of the 2017–18 UEFA Champions League season and was shown a straight red.

=== Lazio ===
On 1 August 2018, Correa returned to Italy to join Lazio on a five-year contract for a €16 million transfer fee. He made his debut for Lazio on 18 August, in a 1–2 home loss against Napoli. On 26 September 2018, he scored his first goal for Lazio in 2–1 home win against Udinese.

In the 2018–19 Coppa Italia, Correa scored the goal that eliminated AC Milan from the competition and allowed Lazio to reach the final. In the final, Correa scored the second goal in a 2–0 win against Atalanta, winning the first trophy with Lazio. In his first season with Lazio, he made 44 appearances, scoring 9 goals.

On 10 October 2019, he extended his contract with Lazio until 2024. On 22 December 2019, he started in Lazio's 3–1 win in the 2019 Supercoppa Italiana, winning his second trophy with the club. In his second season, he made 35 appearances, scoring 10 goals. In his third and last season with Lazio, he made 38 appearances, scoring 11 goals.

=== Inter Milan ===
On 26 August 2021, Correa joined Inter Milan on a year-long loan deal with an obligation to buy with three-year contract to take effect after the loan period. On 27 August, he made his league debut for Inter Milan in a 3–1 win over Verona where he came on as a substitute and scored twice.

==== Loan to Marseille ====
On 25 August 2023, Correa joined Marseille on a one-year loan with an option to buy. He played twelve matches for the Ligue 1 team.

=== Botafogo ===
On 10 June 2025, Correa signed with Brazilian Série A club Botafogo until the end of 2027. On October 26, after 20 games for Alvinegro, Tucu scored his first two goals wearing the club's shirt, in a 2–2 draw with Santos, at the Nilton Santos Stadium, in Rio.

== International career ==
Correa made his senior international debut for Argentina on 9 June 2017, in a 1–0 win over rivals Brazil held in Melbourne. On 13 June, he scored his first international goal in a 6–0 away friendly win over Singapore. He was a part of the victorious Argentine squad at the 2021 Copa America making 3 appearances at the tournament.

He was called up to the 26 man squad for the 2022 FIFA World Cup by manager Lionel Scaloni, but ultimately ended up missing the tournament due to an injury sustained 5 days before it started. He was replaced by Thiago Almada.

== Style of play ==
Correa is primarily deployed as a deep-lying forward or supporting striker, although he is also capable of functioning as a left winger, or as a centre-forward. Among his main strengths are his ball control, dribbling ability, pace, and agility. He has cited the Brazilian former attacking midfielder and playmaker Kaká as an inspiration.

== Career statistics ==
=== Club ===
As of match played 14 May 2026

Appearances and goals by club, season and competition
Club	Season	League			National cup (Note: Includes Copa Argentina, Coppa Italia, Copa del Rey, Copa do Brasil)		Continental		Other		Total	
Club	Season	Division	Apps	Goals	Apps	Goals	Apps	Goals	Apps	Goals	Apps	Goals
Estudiantes	2010–11	Argentine Primera División	3	0	0	0	0	0	—		3	0
Estudiantes	2011–12	Argentine Primera División	8	0	2	0	0	0	—		10	0
Estudiantes	2012–13	Argentine Primera División	26	1	3	1	0	0	—		29	2
Estudiantes	2013–14	Argentine Primera División	16	2	0	0	6 (Note: Appearances in Copa Sudamericana)	1	—		24	3
Estudiantes	Total		53	3	5	1	6	1	—		64	5
Sampdoria	2014–15	Serie A	6	0	0	0	—		—		6	0
Sampdoria	2015–16	Serie A	25	3	0	0	0	0	—		25	3
Sampdoria	Total		31	3	0	0	0	0	—		31	3
Sevilla	2016–17	La Liga	26	4	4	3	3 (Note: Appearances in UEFA Champions League)	1	1 (Note: Appearance in Supercopa de España)	0	34	8
Sevilla	2017–18	La Liga	21	1	8	5	10	1	—		39	7
Sevilla	Total		47	5	12	8	13	2	1	0	73	15
Lazio	2018–19	Serie A	34	5	4	2	6 (Note: Appearances in UEFA Europa League)	2	—		44	9
Lazio	2019–20	Serie A	30	9	1	0	3	1	1 (Note: Appearance in Supercoppa Italiana)	0	35	10
Lazio	2020–21	Serie A	28	8	2	0	8	3	—		38	11
Lazio	Total		92	22	7	2	17	6	1	0	117	30
Inter Milan (loan)	2021–22	Serie A	26	6	4	0	5	0	1	0	36	6
Inter Milan	2022–23	Serie A	26	3	4	0	9	1	1	0	40	4
Inter Milan	2024–25	Serie A	19	2	3	0	0	0	0	0	22	2
Inter Milan	Inter total		71	11	11	0	14	1	2	0	98	12
Marseille (loan)	2023–24	Ligue 1	12	0	0	0	7	0	—		19	0
Botafogo	2025	Série A	18	2	3	0	2 (Note: Appearances in Copa Libertadores)	0	2 (Note: Appearances in FIFA Club World Cup)	0	25	2
Botafogo	2026	Série A	5	0	2	0	4 (Note: Three appearances in Copa Libertadores, one appearance in Copa Sudamericana)	0	2 (Note: Appearances in Campeonato Carioca)	1	13	1
Botafogo	Total		23	2	5	0	6	0	4	1	38	3
Career total			329	46	40	11	63	10	8	1	440	68

=== International ===
Appearances and goals by national team and year
National team	Year	Apps	Goals
Argentina	2017	3	1
Argentina	2018	0	0
Argentina	2019	1	0
Argentina	2020	1	1
Argentina	2021	11	1
Argentina	2022	4	1
Total		20	4

Scores and results list Argentina's goal tally first.

List of international goals scored by Joaquín Correa
No.	Date	Venue	Opponent	Score	Result	Competition
1.	13 June 2017	National Stadium, Kallang, Singapore	Singapore	2–0	6–0	Friendly
2.	13 October 2020	Estadio Hernando Siles, La Paz, Bolivia	Bolivia	2–1	2–1	2022 FIFA World Cup qualification
3.	2 September 2021	Estadio Olímpico de la UCV, Caracas, Venezuela	Venezuela	2–0	3–1	2022 FIFA World Cup qualification
4.	16 November 2022	Mohammed bin Zayed Stadium, Abu Dhabi, United Arab Emirates	United Arab Emirates	5–0	5–0	Friendly

== Honours ==
Sevilla

- Copa del Rey runner-up: 2017–18

Lazio

- Coppa Italia: 2018–19
- Supercoppa Italiana: 2019

Inter Milan

- Coppa Italia: 2021–22, 2022–23
- Supercoppa Italiana: 2021, 2022
- UEFA Champions League runner-up: 2022–23

Argentina

- Copa América: 2021
- CONMEBOL–UEFA Cup of Champions: 2022
