= Pablo Sarabia =

Spanish footballer (born 1992)

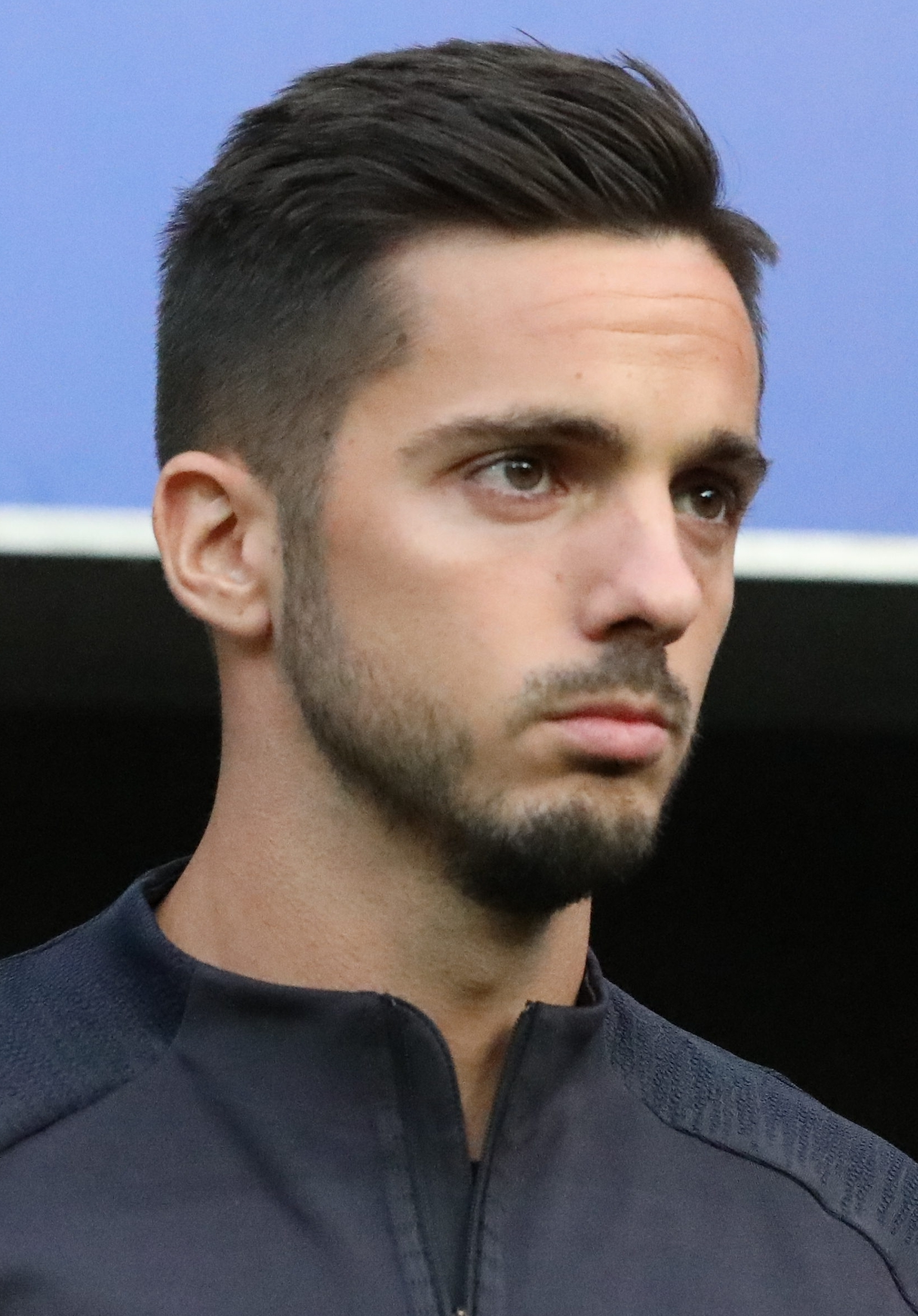
- Sarabia with Paris Saint-Germain in 2019

Personal information
- Full name: Pablo Sarabia García
- Date of birth: 11 May 1992 (age 34)
- Place of birth: Madrid, Spain
- Height: 1.79 m (5 ft 10 in)
- Positions: Attacking midfielder; winger

Team information
- Current team: Al-Arabi
- Number: 7

Youth career
- 2000–2004: EFMO Boadilla
- 2004–2009: Real Madrid

Senior career*
Years	Team	Apps	(Gls)
2009–2011	Real Madrid Castilla	49	(15)
2010	Real Madrid	0	(0)
2011–2016	Getafe	131	(10)
2016–2019	Sevilla	101	(26)
2019–2023	Paris Saint-Germain	64	(11)
2021–2022	→ Sporting CP (loan)	29	(15)
2023–2025	Wolverhampton Wanderers	66	(8)
2025–	Al-Arabi	30	(15)

International career
2008	Spain U16	3	(2)
2008–2009	Spain U17	20	(5)
2010	Spain U18	2	(0)
2010–2011	Spain U19	16	(8)
2011–2014	Spain U21	22	(4)
2019–2024	Spain	27	(9)
Medal record
Men's football
Representing Spain
UEFA Nations League
Runner-up	2021 Italy	Team
UEFA European Championship
Bronze medal – third place	2020 Europe	Team
UEFA European Under-21 Championship
Winner	2013 Israel	Team
UEFA European Under-19 Championship
Winner	2011 Romania	Team
- * Club domestic league appearances and goals as of 04:28, 7 November 2026 (UTC)

Pablo Sarabia García (Spanish pronunciation: [ˈpaβlo saˈɾaβja ɣaɾˈθi.a]; (Note: In isolation, García is pronounced [ɡaɾˈθi.a].) born 11 May 1992) is a Spanish professional footballer who plays for Qatar Stars League club Al-Arabi. Mainly an attacking midfielder, he can also play as a right winger.

After playing youth football with Real Madrid, he went on to represent Getafe and Sevilla in La Liga, amassing totals of 232 matches and 36 goals over eight seasons. In July 2019, he signed with French club Paris Saint-Germain, where he would win three Ligue 1 titles and finish as runner-up in the 2020 Champions League, also being loaned to Sporting CP for one year. He joined Wolverhampton Wanderers in January 2023.

Sarabia was a former Spanish youth international. He made his senior debut in 2019, representing the side at Euro 2020 and the 2022 World Cup.

== Club career ==
=== Real Madrid ===
Born in Madrid, Sarabia played in the Escuela de Fútbol Madrid Oeste de Boadilla del Monte football academy until 2004, when Real Madrid signed him at the age of 12. After appearing for several of its youth teams, he made his debut in the Segunda División B against Alcorcón on 3 January 2010. He scored his first goal for Real Madrid Castilla two weeks later, in a 5–2 home win over Racing de Santander B.

Sarabia was called up by the first team for the first time in December 2010, for a UEFA Champions League home fixture against Auxerre. He was given number 33 and came on as a substitute for Cristiano Ronaldo in the 72nd minute of a 4–0 group stage victory, on the 8th; after his debut, he stated: "This was a tremendous night that I will never forget".

In his second season with Castilla, manager Alberto Toril assigned Sarabia a greater role in the team, moving him from his usual winger position to attacking midfielder. He responded by scoring 12 goals in the league, third in the squad behind Joselu and Álvaro Morata (14 apiece), as the reserves eventually fell short in the promotion playoffs.

=== Getafe ===
On 3 July 2011, Sarabia signed a five-year contract with neighbours Getafe for a reported fee of around €3 million, with Real Madrid having the option to buy him back after two years. After two first slow seasons, he became first choice, scoring his first goal in the top flight on 31 October 2013 to close a 2–0 win at Villarreal.

Sarabia scored a squad-best seven goals in his final campaign at the Coliseum Alfonso Pérez, but Getafe suffered relegation as second-bottom.

=== Sevilla ===
Sarabia joined Sevilla on a four-year deal on 9 June 2016. He made his competitive debut for his new club on 14 August, playing 36 minutes in the 0–2 home defeat against Barcelona in the first leg of the Supercopa de España.

In the 2018–19 season, Sarabia scored a career-best 12 goals – behind only Wissam Ben Yedder's 18 in the side – while also providing 13 assists, helping the Andalusians to sixth place.

=== Paris Saint-Germain ===
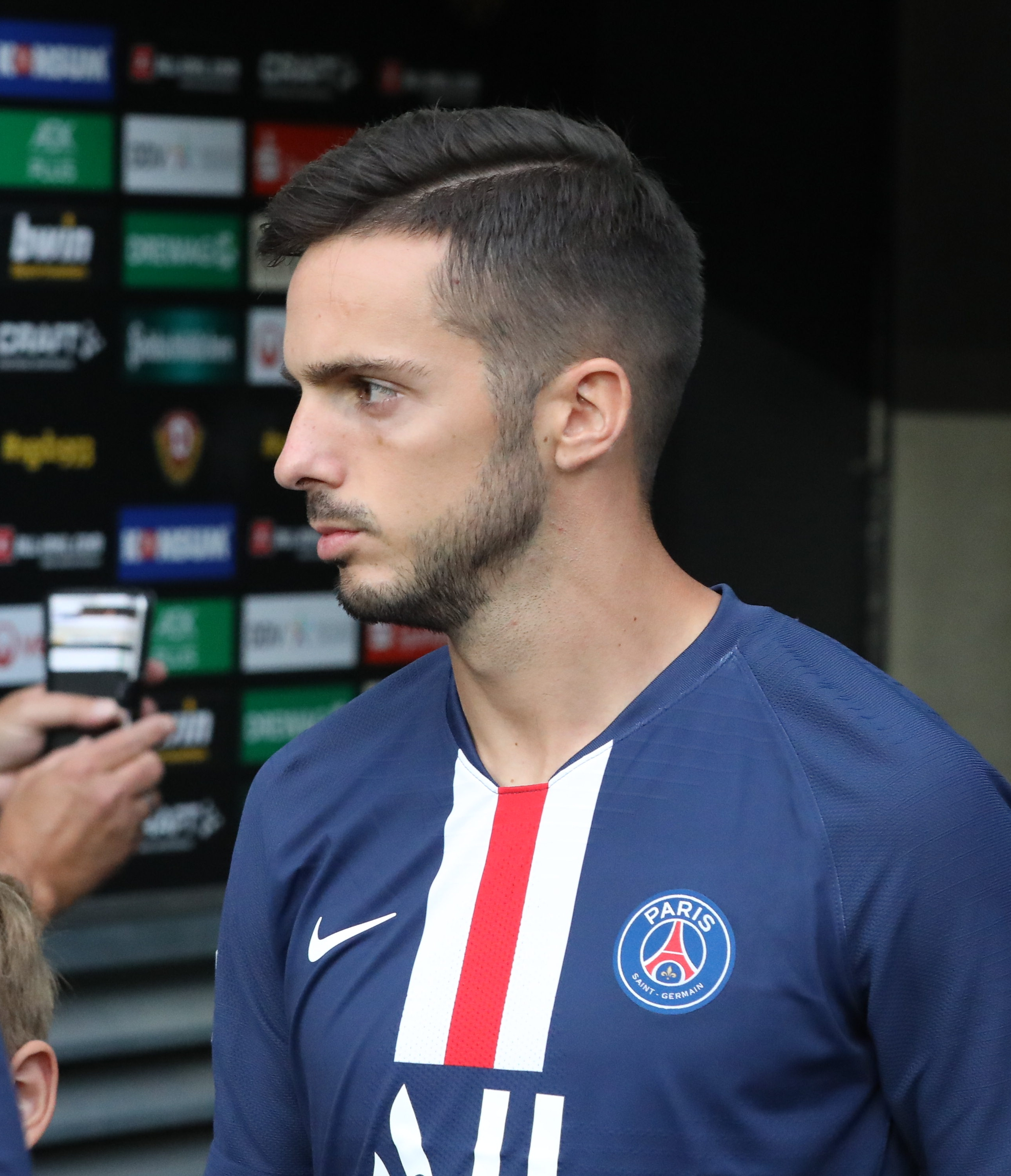
Sarabia with Paris Saint-Germain in 2019

On 2 July 2019, Sarabia signed a five-year contract with Paris Saint-Germain. He scored his first goal in Ligue 1 on 5 October, opening the 4–0 home defeat of Angers and later making two assists.

Sarabia scored the winning penalty in the 2020 Coupe de la Ligue final against Lyon on 31 July, following a 0–0 draw after 120 minutes. He added six goals in 27 appearances in the domestic league for the runners-up (seven in all competitions).

On 1 September 2021, Sarabia joined Portuguese club Sporting CP on a season-long loan. He made his Primeira Liga debut ten days later, replacing Jovane Cabral for the last 30 minutes of the 1–1 draw against Porto. He scored his first goal on 28 November, opening a 2–0 home win over Tondela.

On 29 January 2022, Sarabia profited from a long ball from his compatriot Pedro Porro to complete a 2–1 comeback victory against Benfica in the final of the Taça da Liga in Leiria. He scored a squad-best 15 times in the league for the runners-up, 21 overall.

=== Wolverhampton Wanderers ===
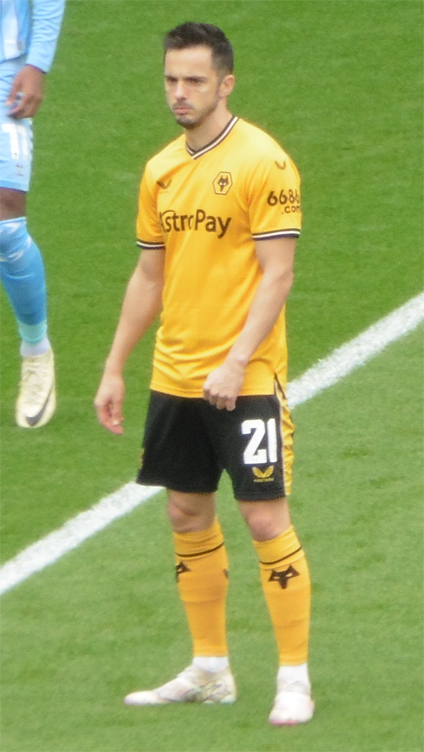
Sarabia playing for Wolverhampton Wanderers in 2024

On 17 January 2023, Premier League side Wolverhampton Wanderers announced the transfer of Sarabia on a two-and-a-half-year deal, for a reported €5 million fee. He made his league debut five days later, replacing Adama Traoré at half-time in an eventual 3–0 loss at Manchester City. He made his first start on 4 February, helping the hosts to defeat Liverpool by the same score. He scored his first goal on 24 February, opening the 1–1 draw away to Fulham.

Sarabia scored his first home goal for Wolves, an equaliser, after coming on as an 87th-minute substitute against Tottenham Hotspur on 11 November 2023. He then provided the cross for Mario Lemina's 2–1 winner, thereby becoming the player to have been introduced at the latest point in a Premier League game in its history to have both scored and assisted a goal.

On 9 November 2024, Sarabia scored his first goal of the season, opening the 2–0 win over Southampton and contributing to his team's first league win as they left the bottom of the table. After over four months without finding the net, he came off the bench to equalise and later assist in a 2–1 away victory against Ipswich Town, moving his side 12 points clear of the relegation zone. On 20 April 2025, through a free kick, he scored the only goal at Old Trafford to defeat hosts Manchester United, secure survival and mark the first time the club had won five top-flight games in a row since 1970 and achieved a first league double over that opposition since 1979–80.

Sarabia left Wolverhampton on 30 June 2025, with 77 appearances to his credit.

=== Al-Arabi ===
On 18 June 2025, Sarabia joined Al-Arabi on a two year contract.

== International career ==
In 2008, Sarabia earned his first cap for the Spain under-16 team. He appeared with the under-17s at the 2009 FIFA World Cup in Nigeria, playing all seven games and scoring once as the national side finished in third place. In 2011, he featured as captain in Spain's campaign in the UEFA European Under-19 Championship, which ended in conquest.

Sarabia was called up to the full side by manager Robert Moreno on 30 August 2019 for two UEFA Euro 2020 qualifying matches against Romania and Faroe Islands, making his debut in the former match in a 2–1 away victory after replacing Dani Ceballos in the 77th minute – later, he spoke of his "pride" in having achieved this. On 15 November, as a late call-up due to others' injuries, he started a 7–0 home rout of Malta in Cádiz and scored his first international goal for the already qualified Spaniards.

On 24 May 2021, Sarabia was included in Luis Enrique's 24-man squad for Euro 2020. He scored a goal in Spain's final group match, a 5–0 win over Slovakia, adding another in their 5–3 extra time victory against Croatia in the round of 16.

Sarabia was also selected for the 2022 FIFA World Cup in Qatar. His only appearance was as a last-minute substitute in the last-16 match against Morocco, and he missed his attempt in the 3–0 penalty shootout loss.

== Career statistics ==
=== Club ===
As of match played 27 April 2026

Appearances and goals by club, season and competition
Club	Season	League			National cup (Note: Includes Copa del Rey, Coupe de France, Taça de Portugal, FA Cup, QSL Cup)		League cup (Note: Includes Coupe de la Ligue, Taça da Liga, EFL Cup)		Continental		Other		Total	
Club	Season	Division	Apps	Goals	Apps	Goals	Apps	Goals	Apps	Goals	Apps	Goals	Apps	Goals
Real Madrid Castilla	2009–10	Segunda División B	16	3	—		—		—		—		16	3
Real Madrid Castilla	2010–11	Segunda División B	33	12	—		—		—		—		33	12
Real Madrid Castilla	Total		49	15	—		—		—		—		49	15
Real Madrid	2010–11	La Liga	0	0	0	0	—		1 (Note: Appearances in UEFA Champions League)	0	—		1	0
Getafe	2011–12	La Liga	19	0	1	0	—		—		—		20	0
Getafe	2012–13	La Liga	13	0	3	1	—		—		—		16	1
Getafe	2013–14	La Liga	33	1	4	1	—		—		—		37	2
Getafe	2014–15	La Liga	35	2	5	2	—		—		—		40	4
Getafe	2015–16	La Liga	31	7	1	0	—		—		—		32	7
Getafe	Total		131	10	14	4	—		—		—		145	14
Sevilla	2016–17	La Liga	34	8	3	2	—		7	1	2 (Note: Appearances in Supercopa de España)	0	46	11
Sevilla	2017–18	La Liga	34	6	8	2	—		11	1	—		53	9
Sevilla	2018–19	La Liga	33	12	5	1	—		13 (Note: Appearances in UEFA Europa League)	8	1	1	52	22
Sevilla	Total		101	26	16	5	—		31	10	3	1	151	42
Paris Saint-Germain	2019–20	Ligue 1	21	4	6	7	3	1	9	2	1 (Note: Appearance in Trophée des Champions)	0	40	14
Paris Saint-Germain	2020–21	Ligue 1	27	6	5	1	—		4	0	1	0	37	7
Paris Saint-Germain	2021–22	Ligue 1	2	1	0	0	—		0	0	0	0	2	1
Paris Saint-Germain	2022–23	Ligue 1	14	0	1	0	—		3	0	1	0	19	0
Paris Saint-Germain	Total		64	11	12	8	3	1	16	2	3	0	98	22
Sporting CP (loan)	2021–22	Primeira Liga	29	15	4	2	4	2	8	2	—		45	21
Wolverhampton Wanderers	2022–23	Premier League	13	1	0	0	—		—		—		13	1
Wolverhampton Wanderers	2023–24	Premier League	30	4	4	0	2	0	—		—		36	4
Wolverhampton Wanderers	2024–25	Premier League	23	3	3	0	2	0	—		—		28	3
Wolverhampton Wanderers	Total		66	8	7	0	4	0	—		—		77	8
Al-Arabi	2025–26	Qatar Stars League	21	9	3	3	0	0	—		—		24	12
Career total			461	94	56	22	11	3	56	13	6	1	590	133

=== International ===
Appearances and goals by national team and year
National team	Year	Apps	Goals
Spain	2019	3	1
Spain	2021	13	4
Spain	2022	10	4
Spain	2024	1	0
Total		27	9

Scores and results list Spain's goal tally first, score column indicates score after each Sarabia goal.

List of international goals scored by Pablo Sarabia
No.	Date	Venue	Opponent	Score	Result	Competition
1	15 November 2019	Estadio Ramón de Carranza, Cádiz, Spain	Malta	4–0	7–0	UEFA Euro 2020 qualifying
2	23 June 2021	Estadio de La Cartuja, Seville, Spain	Slovakia	3–0	5–0	UEFA Euro 2020
3	28 June 2021	Parken Stadium, Copenhagen, Denmark	Croatia	1–1	5–3 (a.e.t.)	UEFA Euro 2020
4	5 September 2021	Estadio Nuevo Vivero, Badajoz, Spain	Georgia	4–0	4–0	2022 FIFA World Cup qualification
5	11 November 2021	Olympic Stadium, Athens, Greece	Greece	1–0	1–0	2022 FIFA World Cup qualification
6	29 March 2022	Estadio Riazor, A Coruña, Spain	Iceland	4–0	5–0	Friendly
7	29 March 2022	Estadio Riazor, A Coruña, Spain	Iceland	5–0	5–0	Friendly
8	9 June 2022	Stade de Genève, Geneva, Switzerland	Switzerland	1–0	1–0	2022–23 UEFA Nations League A
9	12 June 2022	La Rosaleda Stadium, Málaga, Spain	Czech Republic	2–0	2–0	2022–23 UEFA Nations League A

== Honours ==
Sevilla

- Copa del Rey runner-up: 2017–18
- Supercopa de España runner-up: 2016, 2018
- UEFA Super Cup runner-up: 2016

Paris Saint-Germain

- Ligue 1: 2019–20, 2021–22, 2022–23
- Coupe de France: 2019–20, 2020–21
- Coupe de la Ligue: 2019–20
- Trophée des Champions: 2019, 2020, 2022
- UEFA Champions League runner-up: 2019–20

Sporting CP

- Taça da Liga: 2021–22

Spain U17

- FIFA U-17 World Cup third place: 2009

Spain U19

- UEFA European Under-19 Championship: 2011

Spain U21

- UEFA European Under-21 Championship: 2013

Spain

- UEFA Nations League runner-up: 2020–21

Individual

- UEFA La Liga Team of the Season: 2018–19
