= Steven Nzonzi =

French footballer (born 1988)

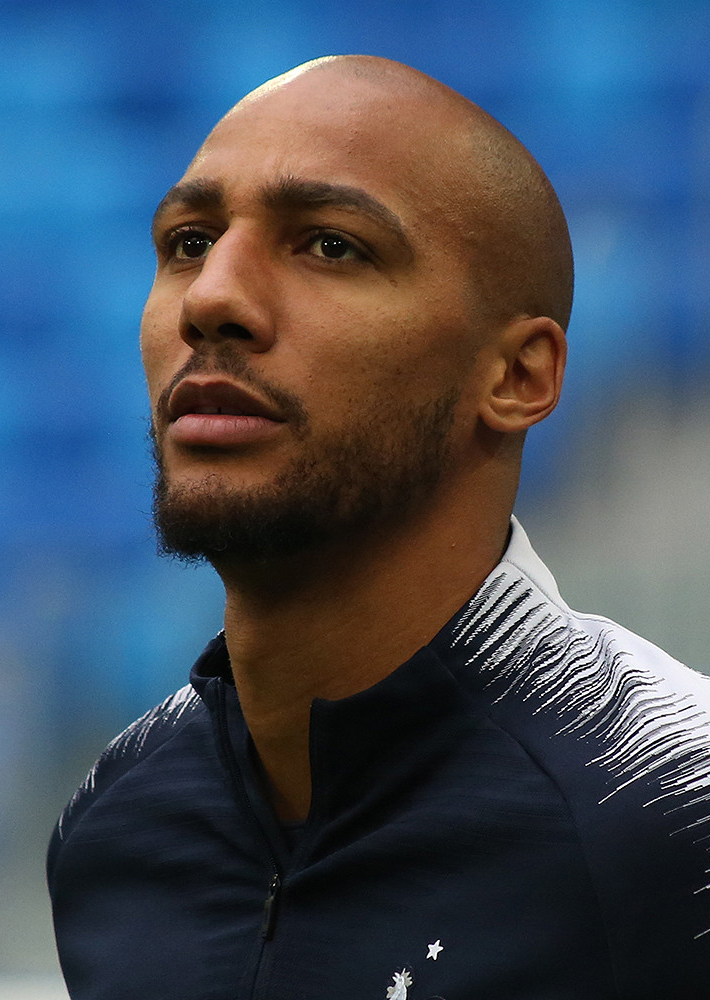
- Nzonzi with France at the 2018 FIFA World Cup

Personal information
- Full name: Steven Nkemboanza Mike Christopher Nzonzi
- Date of birth: 15 December 1988 (age 37)
- Place of birth: La Garenne-Colombes, France
- Height: 1.97 m (6 ft 6 in)
- Position: Defensive midfielder

Team information
- Current team: Dunkerque
- Number: 15

Youth career
- 1998–1999: Racing Paris
- 1999–2002: Paris Saint-Germain
- 2002–2003: CA Lisieux
- 2003–2004: Caen
- 2004–2005: Beauvais
- 2005–2007: Amiens

Senior career*
Years	Team	Apps	(Gls)
2007–2009	Amiens	37	(1)
2009–2012	Blackburn Rovers	86	(5)
2012–2015	Stoke City	109	(6)
2015–2018	Sevilla	90	(6)
2018–2021	Roma	30	(1)
2019–2020	→ Galatasaray (loan)	10	(0)
2020–2021	→ Rennes (loan)	39	(1)
2021–2023	Al-Rayyan	39	(2)
2023–2024	Konyaspor	33	(4)
2024–2025	Sepahan	24	(1)
2025–2026	Stoke City	30	(1)
2026–	Dunkerque	6	(0)

International career
2009–2010	France U21	6	(0)
2017–2020	France	20	(0)
Medal record
Men's football
Representing France
FIFA World Cup
Winner	2018 Russia
- * Club domestic league appearances and goals as of 20:30, 6 November 2026 (UTC)

Steven Nkemboanza Mike Christopher Nzonzi (born 15 December 1988) is a French professional footballer who plays as a defensive midfielder for Ligue 2 club Dunkerque.

Nzonzi began his career with Ligue 2 side Amiens, impressing enough to earn a move to Premier League side Blackburn Rovers in 2009 for £650,000. He spent three years with the club which ended with Rovers being relegated at the end of the 2011–12 season. He remained in the Premier League however, joining Stoke City for £3 million. At Stoke, Nzonzi established himself as a key member of the squad under Tony Pulis and then under Mark Hughes, where his performances during the 2014–15 earned him the club's Player of the Year award. He joined Spanish side Sevilla for a fee of £7 million in July 2015, and won the UEFA Europa League in his first season. Nzonzi joined Italian club Roma in 2018, where he played a season before being loaned to Galatasaray in Turkey and Rennes in France the following two seasons. In 2021, he signed for Qatari side Al-Rayyan. He then spent a season in Turkey with Konyaspor and then in Iran with Sepahan. In July 2025, he made a brief return to Stoke City.

Nzonzi represented France at under-21 level. He turned down the chance to represent his ancestral DR Congo at senior international level, and was unsuccessful in his attempt to become eligible to play for England. In November 2017, he made his debut for the senior France squad, and he was part of their team that won the 2018 FIFA World Cup.

== Club career ==
=== Early career ===
Born in La Garenne-Colombes, France, to a Congolese father and French mother, he began his career playing for hometown club Racing Paris. In 1999, he joined the youth system of Paris Saint-Germain playing at the Camp des Loges, the club's youth academy. While at Paris Saint-Germain, Nzonzi, due to his height, was initially installed in the club's academy as a striker and then as an attacking midfielder. After a three-year stint at the Ligue 1 club, he moved to the Basse-Normandie region joining CA Lisieux. He later had one-year stints at both SM Caen and AS Beauvais Oise before finally settling in with Amiens SC in 2005.

=== Amiens ===
After featuring in the Championnat de France amateur 2 for his first two years at the club, Nzonzi made his professional debut on 24 November 2007 in a Coupe de France match against amateur club AS Raismes appearing as a substitute in the 74th minute, Amiens won the match 7–0. He earned his first start on 15 April 2008 playing the entire 90 minutes in a 1–0 loss to Bastia. Following the season, he signed his first professional contract and was officially promoted to the senior team.

Nzonzi was given the starting defensive midfielder role for the 2008–09 season and appeared in 36 total matches. He also scored his first professional goal in a 2–1 defeat to Strasbourg on 8 May 2009. The defeat to Strasbourg led to Amiens going winless in their final four matches, which led to the club suffering relegation to the Championnat National, France's third division of football. Despite the relegation, Nzonzi was applauded for his play and he was linked with a move to the English Premier League, with Blackburn Rovers and Portsmouth showing a serious interest in the young Frenchman, who many hailed as the next Patrick Vieira.

=== Blackburn Rovers ===
On 28 June 2009, it was reported that Blackburn Rovers had agreed a deal with Amiens to sign Nzonzi. The move was completed on 30 June, signing for a fee of £650,000, on a four-year contract.

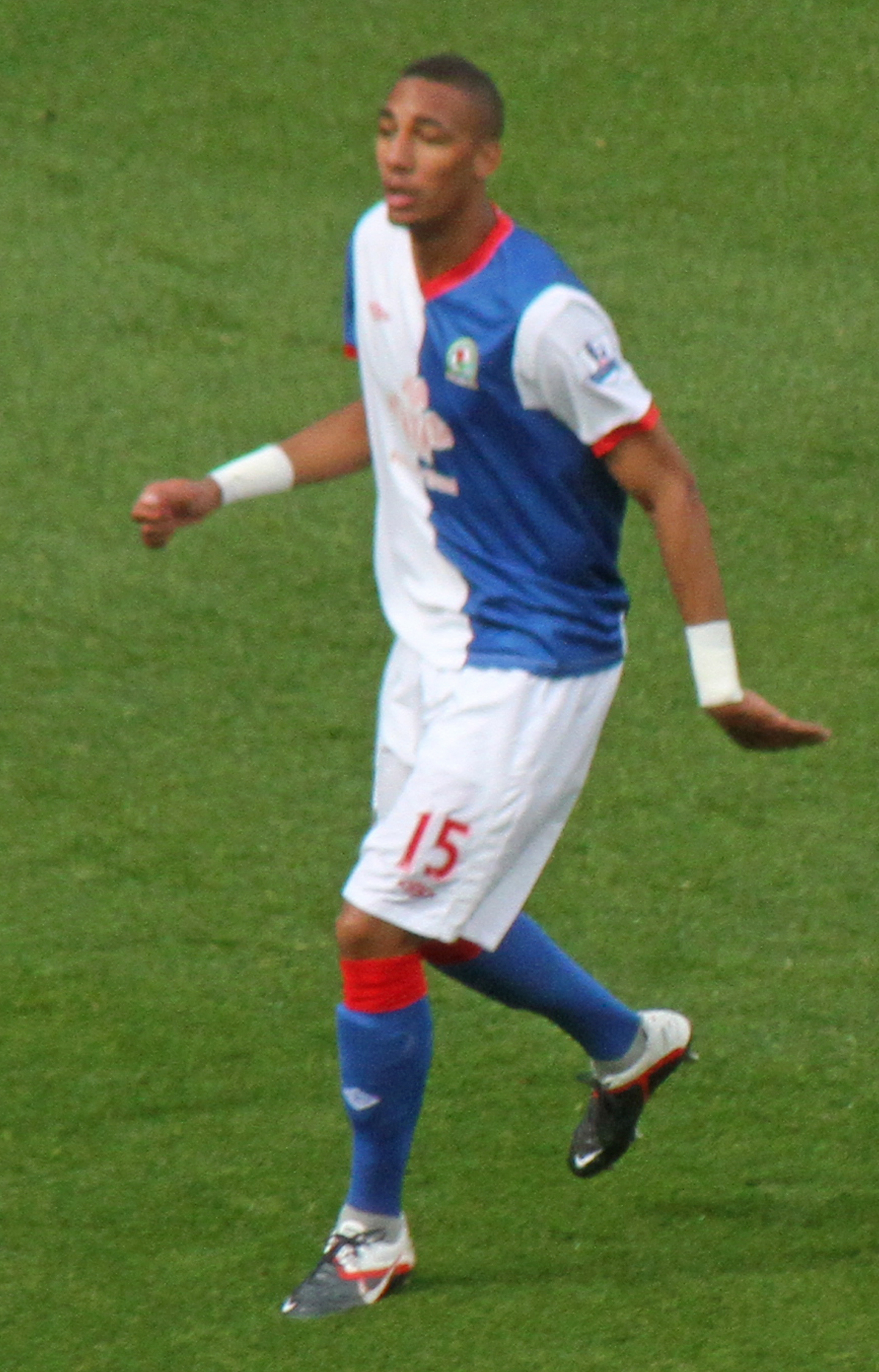
Nzonzi playing for Blackburn Rovers in 2011

On 15 August 2009, Nzonzi made his debut for Blackburn where he made his first start in a 2–0 loss against Manchester City and since making his debut, found himself very much part of Sam Allardyce's plans. He scored his first goal for Rovers on 4 October 2009 against Arsenal in the 6–2 defeat. After scoring his first goal, Nzonzi admitted he had been surprised at how quickly he had established himself in the side but was determined to keep his place in the starting XI. His second goal for the club was a 30-yard strike against Everton on 17 April 2010 in a 3–2 defeat at Ewood Park. On 3 May 2010, during the pre-match build up to the Arsenal game, he was announced as the Blackburn Rovers Player of the Year for the 2009–10 season, chosen by the fans.

In August 2010, Nzonzi signed a new five-year deal with Blackburn, lasting until summer 2015. Rovers chairman John Williams said: "We are delighted to secure Steven for the long term. He was outstanding last year and the new deal is richly deserved." On 21 August 2011, Nzonzi scored his third goal for Blackburn with a header against Birmingham City in a 2–1 defeat at St Andrew's. Soon after Nzonzi found himself dropping down the pecking order as a result of both Phil Jones and Vince Grella's form in midfield. This led Allardyce urged him to raise his game and recapture his form of last season. Later on in his second season, Allardyce was sacked and replaced by Steve Kean. On 2 April 2011, Nzonzi received his first red card of his career in a 0–0 draw against Arsenal two-footed challenge on Laurent Koscielny. Nzonzi was banned for 4 matches and on 30 April 2011, Nzonzi made his return in a 1–0 win over Bolton Wanderers.

On 26 November 2011 against Stoke City, Nzonzi was hit with a violent conduct charge for intentionally elbowing Ryan Shawcross in the face. Nzonzi served a three-match ban after admitting an FA charge of violent conduct. On 11 February 2012, Nzonzi scored his first goal of the season and set up a goal for the club top scorer Yakubu in a 3–2 win over Queens Park Rangers. On 24 March 2012, Nzonzi scored his second goal of the season in a 2–1 loss against Bolton Wanderers. At the end of the season, Blackburn were relegated for the first time in 11 seasons and Nzonzi told manager Steve Kean he wanted to leave.

=== Stoke City ===
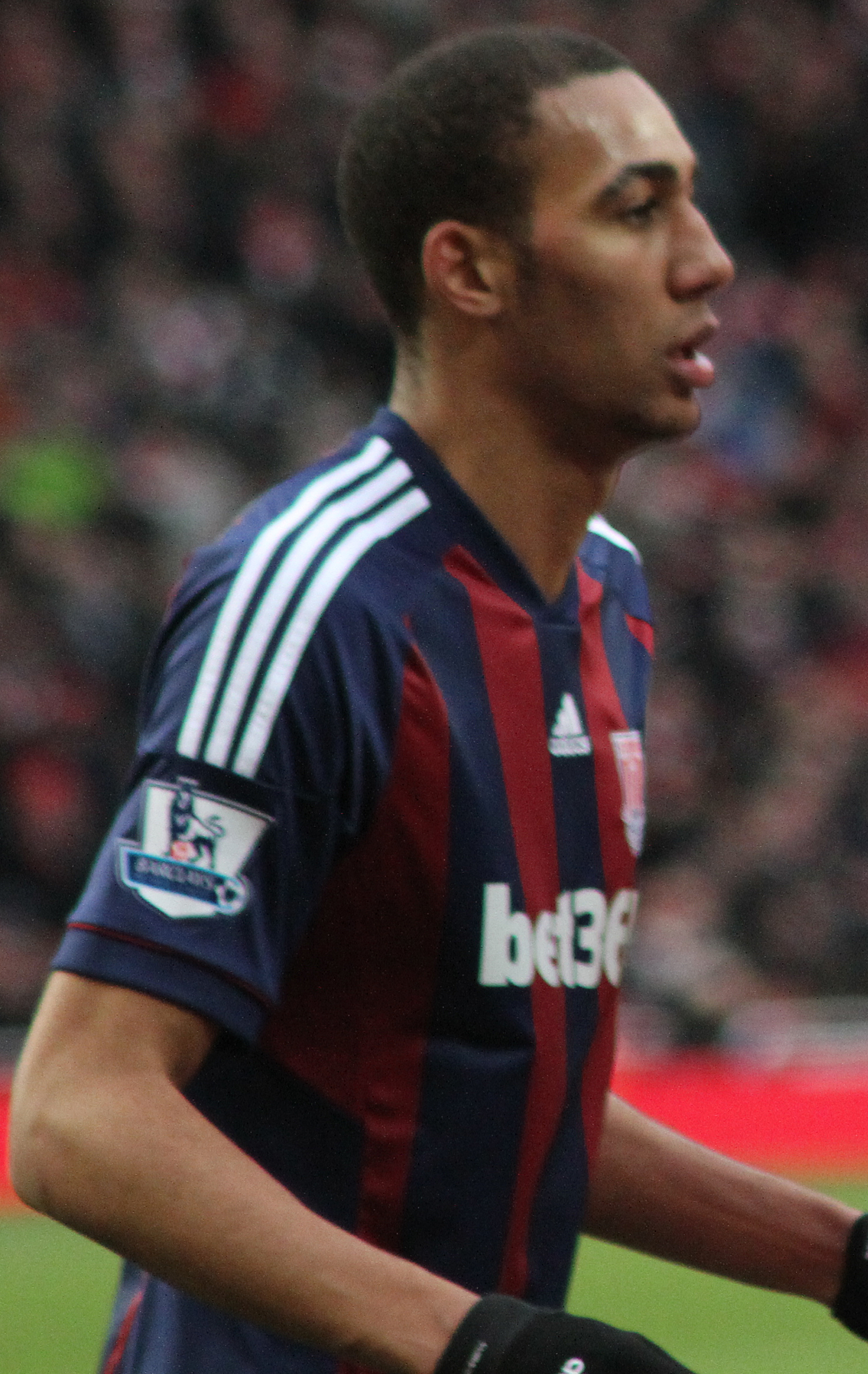
Nzonzi with Stoke City in 2013

On 31 August 2012, Nzonzi joined Stoke City for a fee of £3 million. He made his debut for Stoke in a 1–1 draw at home to Manchester City on 15 September 2012 and his performance earned him the man of the match award. Impressed with Nzonzi's start to his Stoke career manager Tony Pulis believes that he will one day play in the Champions League. Nzonzi was sent off for a "studs-up" challenge on Jack Cork in a 3–3 draw with Southampton on 29 December 2012. However no contact was made with Cork and Pulis decided to appeal Mark Clattenburg's decision. His red card was later rescinded by the FA. After reacting angrily to suffering a broken nose against Fulham, Nzonzi was told to keep his temperament in check by assistant manager David Kemp. He scored his first goal for Stoke in a 2–1 defeat against Tottenham Hotspur on 12 May 2013. He ended the 2012–13 season having made 38 appearances for the club but once the campaign had come to an end he revealed that he was unhappy at the club and handed in a transfer request. His request was rejected by the club.

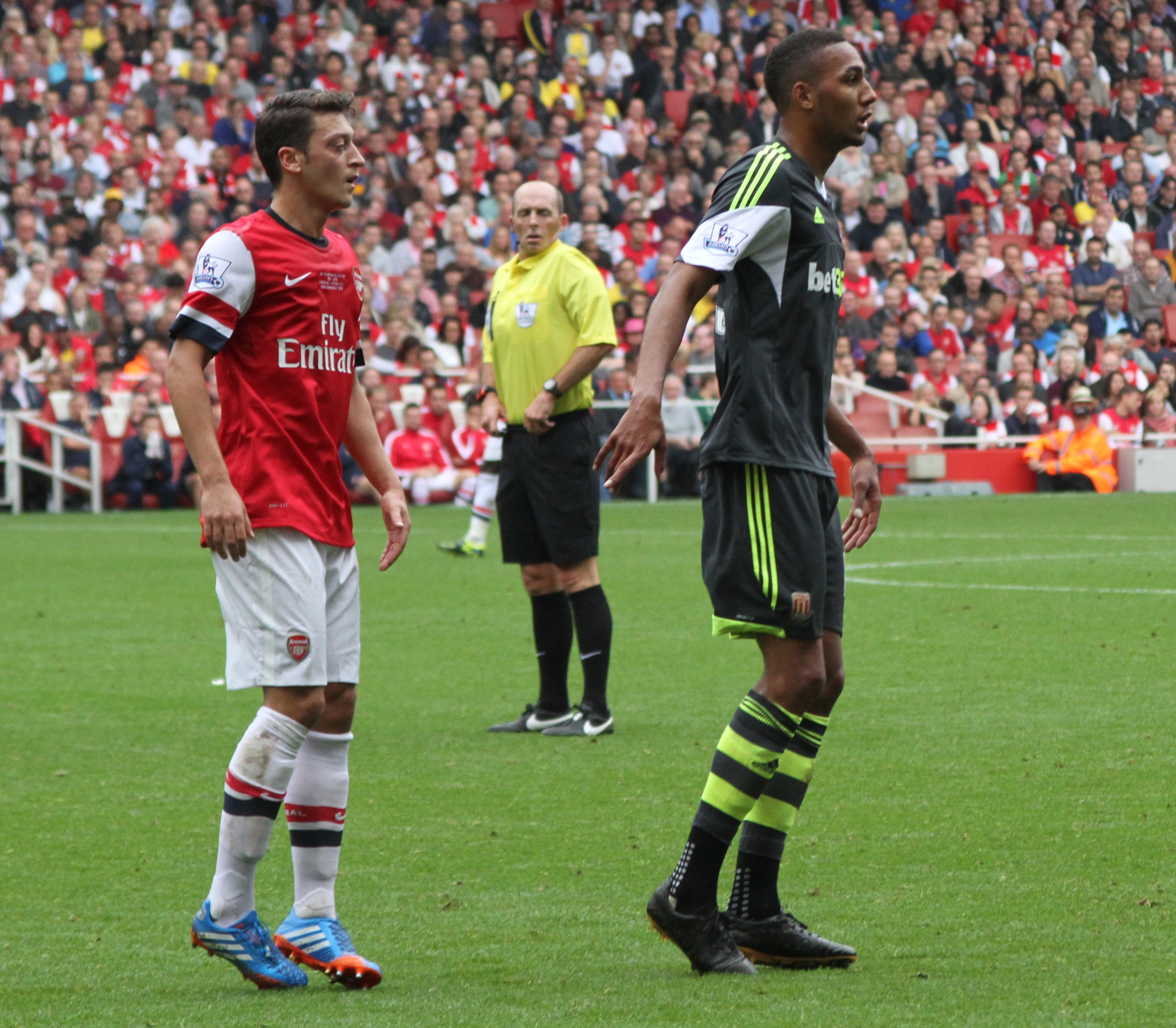
Nzonzi playing for Stoke City against Arsenal in 2013

Under new manager Mark Hughes, Nzonzi remained at Stoke going into the 2013–14 and he produced a man of the match performance against West Ham United on 31 August 2013. However, after this his performances dropped off and assistant manager Mark Bowen advised Nzonzi to stop his 'theatrical sulks'. On 23 November 2013 he scored and provided an assist in a 2–0 win over Sunderland. He was sent-off in the return fixture against Sunderland on 29 January 2014. After serving his suspension Nzonzi spent time on the bench much to his frustration. He returned to the starting line-up and scored in a 4–1 win over Aston Villa on 23 March 2014. He played 40 times for Stoke in 2013–14 as the team finished in 9th position and Nzonzi stated that he is happy playing for Stoke under Mark Hughes. However he handed in a transfer request for a second season running. A move away from Stoke in the summer transfer window did not materialise, despite this Nzonzi insisted he is happy to carry on playing for Stoke.

Nzonzi was an ever-present in 2014–15, playing 42 times as Stoke finished in ninth position for a second consecutive campaign. He also scored a career best of four goals which were against Southampton, Manchester United, Tottenham Hotspur and in a 6–1 victory over Liverpool on the final day of the season. Nzonzi's performances during the campaign earned him the Player of the Year award. In June 2015, with Nzonzi entering his final year on his contract, manager Mark Hughes tried to convince him to agree to sign a new contract. However his efforts were unsuccessful and the club 'reluctantly' accepted a £7 million offer from Sevilla. In total Nzonzi spent three seasons at Stoke making 120 appearances scoring seven goals.

=== Sevilla ===
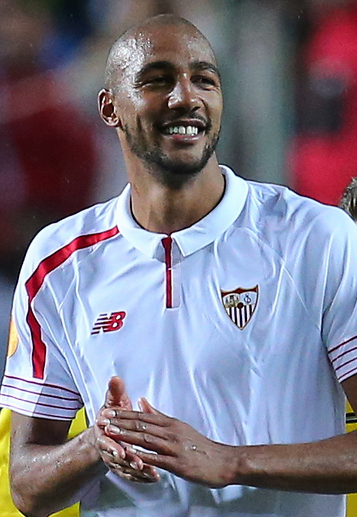
Nzonzi with Sevilla in 2016

On 9 July 2015, Nzonzi signed for Sevilla for a fee around the region of £7 million, on a four-year contract which includes a €30 million (£21.5m) buyout clause. On 22 August, he was sent off on his debut in a goalless draw at Málaga CF.

Nzonzi initially struggled with the immense heat in Andalusia, and a style of play based on retention of the ball and technical ability, but entered a period of good form in the second half of the season, culminating in Sevilla winning the UEFA Europa League final against Liverpool in Basel.

On 23 October 2016, his winning goal in a home victory over Atlético Madrid put his team briefly on top of the league. He was voted La Liga Player of the Month for January 2017, with the league's website writing "Often to be found in the thick of the action, Nzonzi showcased his aptitude for regaining possession and distributing the play, qualities which have seen him establish himself as one of the first names on Sampaoli's team sheet". On 14 March in the second leg of the last 16 of the Champions League, he had a penalty saved by Leicester City's Kasper Schmeichel – as did teammate Joaquín Correa in the first leg – as Sevilla was eliminated 3–2 on aggregate.

=== Roma ===
On 14 August 2018, Nzonzi signed for Serie A club Roma for an initial fee of €26.65 million, plus performance-related clauses that could be worth an additional €4 million. He signed a four-year contract. He made his debut 13 days later in a 3–3 home draw with Atalanta, as a half-time substitute for Bryan Cristante with the team 3–1 down. ESPN FC's analysis named him as man of the match for "adding weight and muscle" to Roma's midfield. On 6 October, he scored his only goal for the Giallorossi, a header in a 2–0 victory at Empoli. Nzonzi made 39 appearances for Roma in 2018–19 as Roma finished sixth in Serie A. At the end of the season it was reported that Roma were actively trying to sell Nzonzi in order to balance their books.

On 16 August 2019, Nzonzi joined Turkish side Galatasaray on loan for the 2019–20 season. He played 15 times for Galatasaray before he was suspended from the team for 'undisciplined behaviour'. He returned to Roma in January 2020 and was loaned to Ligue 1 side Rennes until the end of the 2019–20 season. After Rennes qualified for the UEFA Champions League, Nzonzi's loan was automatically extended for 2020–21 season. At the end of the season Rennes turned down the chance to sign Nzonzi on a permanent contract.

=== Later career ===
On 29 September 2021 Nzonzi left Roma and signed for Qatar Stars League club Al-Rayyan on a two-year contract. After two years in Qatar he signed a one-year contract with Turkish Süper Lig club Konyaspor in August 2023. He made 36 appearances for Konyaspor in 2023–24, helping them to narrowly avoid relegation. For the 2024–25 season, Nzonzi played for Iranian side Sepahan in the Persian Gulf Pro League.

On 8 August 2025, Nzonzi returned to Championship club Stoke City on a one-year deal. Nzonzi played 31 times for the Potters in the 2025–26 season, scoring once in a 3–0 win away at Oxford United. On 14 May 2026, the club announced he would be leaving in the summer when his contract expired.

On 31 July 2026, he signed a contract with French Ligue 2 side USL Dunkerque.

== International career ==
Nzonzi earned his first call up to the France U-21 team by coach Erick Mombaerts on 1 October 2009 for their European Under-21 Championship qualification matches against Malta and Belgium. He made his debut eight days later in the first match, appearing as a 58th-minute substitute for Younousse Sankharé in a 2–0 victory. He earned his first under-21 international start in the match against Belgium, which ended 0–0. In January 2011, he was called up to the DR Congo national team due to his nationality but he did not want to commit to the international team due to structural problems at the administrative level. He did not rule out playing for the Congolese national team in the future. He again turned DR Congo down in November 2012.

In August 2016, Nzonzi's father contacted new England manager Sam Allardyce – who had signed him for Blackburn in 2009 – to inquire whether he was eligible to represent England. Although he had completed more than the five years' necessary residency in the United Kingdom, Nzonzi was ineligible to switch allegiance as he was not eligible for England when he made his debut for France under-21. On 2 November 2017, Nzonzi was called up to the French senior national team for the first time, for friendly matches against Germany and Wales. He made his debut against the Welsh in a 2–0 win at the Stade de France on 10 November, as a half-time substitute for Corentin Tolisso. Nzonzi was part of France's squad that won the 2018 FIFA World Cup in Russia. In the final, he came on as a substitute for the booked N'Golo Kanté after 55 minutes of a 4–2 win over Croatia at the Luzhniki Stadium.

== Style of play ==
Nzonzi plays in a defensive role in centre midfield and is noted for being calm and composed whilst in possession and having a good passing ability. He has earned comparisons to compatriot Patrick Vieira both in style and physical ability. He is also able to cover great distance during a match.

== Personal life ==
In September 2013, Nzonzi was interviewed by police after he was involved in a collision with a cyclist in Hale, Greater Manchester. In October 2015, Nzonzi was ordered to stand trial after allegedly assaulting his wife. He was cleared of the charges in December 2015. Nzonzi has previously commented on the common misstyling of his name as Steven N'Zonzi.

In 2015, he separated from his wife and the divorce was finalized in 2016. He started dating Turkish businesswomen Seda Parseker in 2019, and the couple got married in 2021. After marriage she took his surname and now she is known as Seda Nzonzi. The couple have two children together born in 2023 and 2024; named after himself Steven Junior and Siena.

== Career statistics ==
=== Club ===
As of match played 6 November 2026

Appearances and goals by club, season and competition
Club	Season	League			National cup (Note: Includes Coupe de France, FA Cup, Copa del Rey, Coppa Italia, Emir of Qatar Cup, Turkish Cup, Iranian Hazfi Cup)		League cup (Note: Includes Coupe de la Ligue, EFL Cup, Qatari Stars Cup)		Continental		Other		Total	
Club	Season	Division	Apps	Goals	Apps	Goals	Apps	Goals	Apps	Goals	Apps	Goals	Apps	Goals
Amiens	2007–08	Ligue 2	3	0	2	0	0	0	—		—		5	0
Amiens	2008–09	Ligue 2	34	1	1	0	1	0	—		—		36	1
Amiens	Total		37	1	3	0	1	0	—		—		41	1
Blackburn Rovers	2009–10	Premier League	33	2	0	0	5	0	—		—		38	2
Blackburn Rovers	2010–11	Premier League	21	1	1	0	2	0	—		—		24	1
Blackburn Rovers	2011–12	Premier League	32	2	1	0	1	0	—		—		34	2
Blackburn Rovers	Total		86	5	2	0	8	0	—		—		96	5
Stoke City	2012–13	Premier League	35	1	3	0	0	0	—		—		38	1
Stoke City	2013–14	Premier League	36	2	2	0	2	0	—		—		40	2
Stoke City	2014–15	Premier League	38	3	2	0	2	1	—		—		42	4
Stoke City	Total		109	6	7	0	4	1	—		—		120	7
Sevilla	2015–16	La Liga	28	3	6	1	—		12 (Note: Five appearances in UEFA Champions League, seven appearances in UEFA Europa League)	0	0	0	46	4
Sevilla	2016–17	La Liga	35	2	1	0	—		8 (Note: Appearances in UEFA Champions League)	1	2 (Note: One appearance in Supercopa de España, one appearance in UEFA Super Cup)	0	46	3
Sevilla	2017–18	La Liga	27	1	7	0	—		10	0	—		44	1
Sevilla	Total		90	6	14	1	—		30	1	2	0	136	8
Roma	2018–19	Serie A	30	1	1	0	—		8	0	—		39	1
Galatasaray (loan)	2019–20	Süper Lig	10	0	0	0	—		5	0	—		15	0
Rennes (loan)	2019–20	Ligue 1	5	0	2	0	0	0	0	0	—		7	0
Rennes (loan)	2020–21	Ligue 1	34	1	0	0	—		5	0	—		39	1
Rennes (loan)	Total		39	1	2	0	0	0	5	0	—		46	1
Al-Rayyan	2021–22	Qatar Stars League	17	1	3	0	2	1	0	0	—		22	2
Al-Rayyan	2022–23	Qatar Stars League	22	1	1	0	0	0	7 (Note: Appearances in AFC Champions League)	3	—		30	4
Al-Rayyan	Total		39	2	4	0	2	1	7	3	—		52	6
Konyaspor	2023–24	Süper Lig	33	4	3	0	—		—		—		36	4
Sepahan	2024–25	Persian Gulf Pro League	24	1	1	0	—		6 (Note: Appearances in AFC Champions League Two)	1	1 (Note: Appearance in Iranian Super Cup)	1	32	3
Stoke City	2025–26	EFL Championship	30	1	1	0	0	0	—		—		31	1
Dunkerque	2026–27	Ligue 2	6	0	0	0	–		—		—		6	0
Career total			533	28	38	1	15	2	61	6	3	1	649	38

=== International ===
Appearances and goals by national team and year
National team	Year	Apps	Goals
France	2017	2	0
France	2018	12	0
France	2020	6	0
Total		20	0

== Honours ==
Sevilla

- UEFA Europa League: 2015–16

Sepahan

- Iranian Super Cup: 2024

France

- FIFA World Cup: 2018

Individual

- Blackburn Rovers Player of the Year: 2009–10
- Stoke City Player of the Year: 2014–15
- UEFA Europa League Squad of the Season: 2015–16
- La Liga Player of the Month: January 2017

Orders

- Knight of the Legion of Honour: 2018
