= Nicolás Pareja =

Argentine footballer

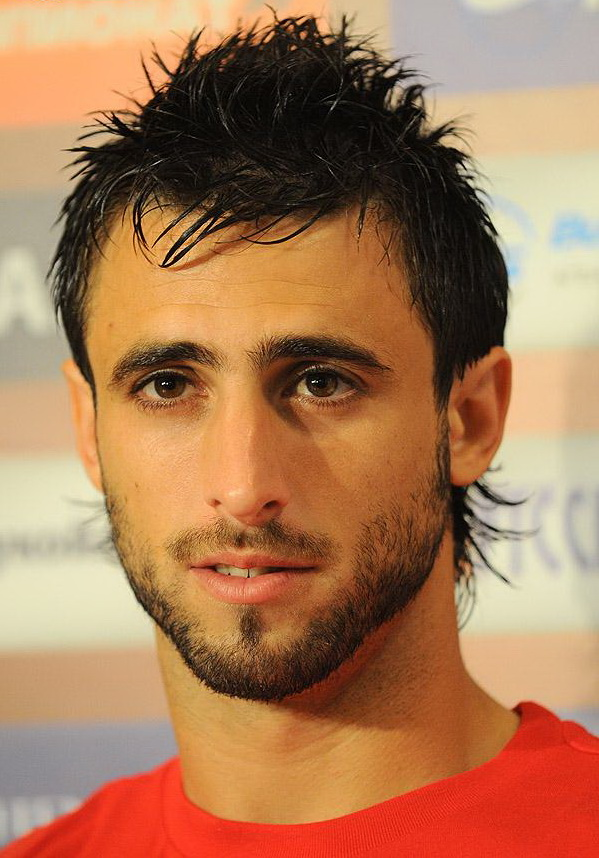
- Pareja in 2010

Personal information
- Full name: Nicolás Martín Pareja
- Date of birth: 19 January 1984 (age 42)
- Place of birth: Buenos Aires, Argentina
- Height: 1.81 m (5 ft 11 in)
- Position: Centre back

Senior career*
Years	Team	Apps	(Gls)
2004–2006	Argentinos Juniors	49	(2)
2006–2008	Anderlecht	39	(0)
2008–2010	Espanyol	60	(3)
2010–2014	Spartak Moscow	47	(3)
2013–2014	→ Sevilla (loan)	25	(0)
2014–2018	Sevilla	60	(2)
2018–2019	Atlas	3	(0)
Total		283	(10)

International career
2008	Argentina Olympic	5	(0)
2010	Argentina	1	(0)
Medal record
Representing Argentina
Men's Football
Gold medal – first place	2008 Beijing	Team competition
- * Club domestic league appearances and goals

Nicolás Martín Pareja (born 19 January 1984) is an Argentine former professional footballer who played as a central defender.

After starting out at Argentinos Juniors he went on to spend most of his career with Spartak Moscow and Sevilla, winning two Europa League trophies with the latter club. He was hindered by several injuries.

Pareja won the 2008 Olympic tournament with Argentina.

== Club career ==
=== Argentinos Juniors ===
Born in Buenos Aires, Pareja started playing for Argentinos Juniors. He scored his first goal in the Primera División on 10 February 2006, in a 2–1 win against Club Atlético Independiente.

=== Anderlecht ===
R.S.C. Anderlecht acquired Pareja in 2006 for €2 million as a replacement for Vincent Kompany, and the former went on to be a teammate of compatriots Lucas Biglia, Nicolás Frutos and Cristian Leiva. His first game in the Pro League took place on 20 August, when he came on as a second-half substitute in the 4–3 away defeat of K.V.C. Westerlo.

Despite several injury problems, Pareja was regularly used during his two-year spell in Belgium, pairing mainly Roland Juhász. In late January 2008, he agreed to a contract extension until June 2012.

=== Espanyol ===
Pareja joined Spanish club RCD Espanyol in the summer of 2008, for a fee of €4.5 million. He made his La Liga debut on 14 September, playing the full 90 minutes in a 1–0 away victory over Recreativo de Huelva, and scored his first goal in the competition the following 11 January to help salvage a point at home to UD Almería (2–2).

During his tenure in Catalonia, Pareja started in all his league appearances.

=== Spartak Moscow ===
In August 2010, after being linked to a move to former side Anderlecht, Pareja signed with FC Spartak Moscow. He made his Russian Premier League debut late in that month, featuring four minutes in a 4–2 home win against FC Tom Tomsk.

After missing out several matches throughout June and July 2011 due to international commitment, both Pareja and compatriot Marcos Rojo were fined for returning late to the club. He netted his first goal on 11 September, the only to help the hosts defeat FC Amkar Perm.

Pareja was handed a three-match ban after being sent off for a hard tackle on PFC CSKA Moscow's Vágner Love in November 2010, being suspended even harsher (four) in October of the next year following a match against FC Zenit Saint Petersburg. He signed a contract extension shortly after the second offense, however, running until 2016.

After featuring regularly in his second season, Pareja appeared only 12 times in his third, due to rotations with Salvatore Bocchetti and Juan Insaurralde as well as physical problems.

=== Sevilla ===
On 4 July 2013, Pareja was loaned to Sevilla FC. He appeared in 37 competitive matches in his debut campaign, including 12 in the UEFA Europa League which his team won; subsequently, he was selected to the 18-man Europa League squad of the season along with teammates Beto, Stéphane Mbia and Ivan Rakitić.

On 23 June 2014, the Andalusians activated his buyout clause for €2.5 million, and Pareja signing a three-year deal. On 3 January of the following year, whilst celebrating his 100th appearance in Spain's top flight, he scored the game's only goal at home against RC Celta de Vigo, through a direct free kick; on 23 April, early into a Europa League quarter-final tie at Zenit, he suffered an anterior cruciate ligament to his right knee, going on to be sidelined until the end of the year.

In late August 2016, the 32-year-old Pareja agreed to a further extension at the Ramón Sánchez Pizjuán Stadium until 2019. Having acted as team captain for the first time on the 28th, in a 0–0 away draw to Villarreal CF, he was named by manager Jorge Sampaoli as one of the four skippers early into the new season.

On 24 August 2018, Pareja's contract was terminated by mutual consent and Daniel Carriço was named the new captain.

=== Atlas ===
On 25 August 2018, Pareja moved to the Mexican Liga MX after joining Club Atlas. Eleven months later, having made only four competitive appearances, he left the club.

== International career ==
Pareja was part of the Argentina Olympic team at the 2008 Summer Olympics in Beijing, contributing with five appearances to the gold medal conquest. His performances earned him praise from Diego Maradona.

Pareja earned his first cap for the full side on 17 November 2010, in a 1–0 friendly win over Brazil. He was selected for the following year's Copa América, being an unused squad member.

In August 2017, Pareja received a call up by his former Sevilla manager Sampaoli for the 2018 FIFA World Cup qualifiers against Uruguay and Venezuela.

== Personal life ==
Relatively small for his position, Pareja first played football in his local neighbourhood. While at Espanyol, he earned the nickname of Torero (bullfighter) because of his middle name "Martín".

Friends with Daniel Jarque, Pareja donned a T-shirt in remembrance of him during the 2014 Europa League celebrations. Having grown up supporting Real Madrid, he also held an Italian passport.

== Honours ==
Anderlecht

- Belgian Pro League: 2006–07
- Belgian Super Cup: 2007

Sevilla

- UEFA Europa League: 2013–14, 2014–15

Argentina

- Summer Olympic Games: 2008
