= Luciano Vietto =

Argentine footballer (born 1993)

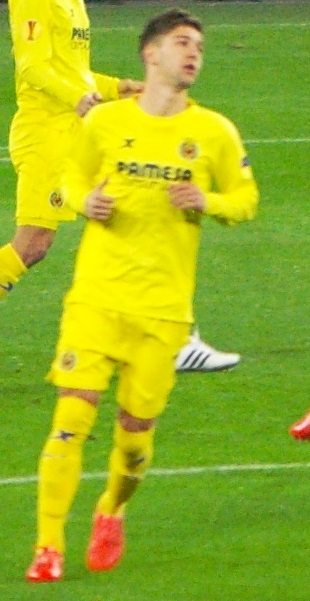
- Vietto with Villarreal in 2014

Personal information
- Full name: Luciano Darío Vietto
- Date of birth: 5 December 1993 (age 32)
- Place of birth: Balnearia, Argentina
- Height: 1.74 m (5 ft 9 in)
- Positions: Forward; winger

Youth career
- 2000–2008: Independiente Balnearia
- 2008–2010: Estudiantes
- 2010–2011: Racing Club

Senior career*
Years	Team	Apps	(Gls)
2011–2014	Racing Club	69	(18)
2014–2015	Villarreal	32	(12)
2015–2019	Atlético Madrid	25	(1)
2016–2017	→ Sevilla (loan)	21	(6)
2018	→ Valencia (loan)	14	(2)
2018–2019	→ Fulham (loan)	20	(1)
2019–2020	Sporting CP	27	(5)
2020–2023	Al-Hilal	60	(9)
2022	→ Al-Shabab (loan)	7	(2)
2023–2024	Al-Qadsiah	32	(17)
2024–2026	Racing Club	27	(7)
2026	San Lorenzo	11	(2)

International career^{‡}
2013	Argentina U20	4	(2)
- * Club domestic league appearances and goals as of 16:56, 4 June 2026 (UTC) ‡ National team caps and goals as of 19 February 2013

Luciano Darío Vietto (Latin American Spanish: [luˈsjano ðaˈɾi.o ˈβjeto]; (Note: In isolation, Darío and Vietto are pronounced [daˈɾi.o] and [ˈbjeto] respectively.) born 5 December 1993) is an Argentine professional footballer who plays as a forward for San Lorenzo.

== Club career ==
=== Early career ===
Vietto was born in the small town of Balnearia in the Province of Córdoba. He joined his local team Independiente de Balnearia at the age of seven.

At the age of 15, Vietto joined Argentine Primera División club Estudiantes, but was released two years later. He subsequently moved to Racing Club's youth academy, after a failed trial at Rosario Central.

=== Racing Club ===
In 2011, Vietto signed his first professional contract, and was called up to the main squad by manager Diego Simeone on 25 October. He made his professional debut on a day later, coming on as a late substitute in a 1–1 home draw against Lanús.

Vietto was handed his first start on 3 September 2012, scoring his first professional goals (and his first hat-trick) in a 3–1 home success over San Martín de San Juan. He became a regular starter under Luis Zubeldía and contributed to 13 goals during the campaign, as his side only finished fifth.

Vietto signed a four-year contract extension with Racing on 26 March 2013.

Vietto appeared in 35 matches in 2013–14, scoring five times. Highlights included a brace in a 3–1 away win against Gimansia La Plata on 2 November 2013.

=== Villarreal ===
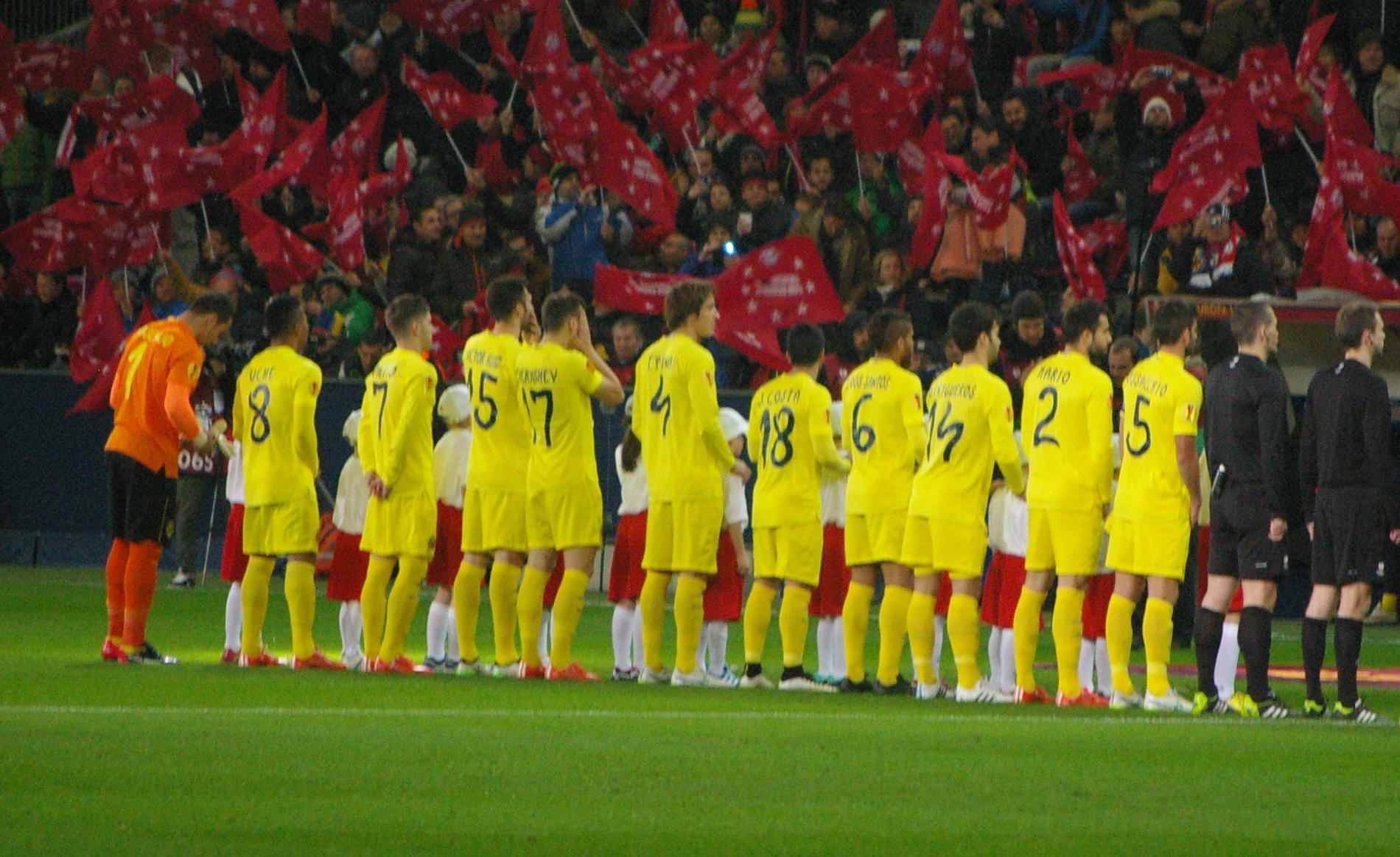
Vietto (3rd from left) lining up alongside his Villarreal teammates in 2015

On 4 August 2014, Vietto signed a five-year deal with La Liga side Villarreal CF, for a rumoured €5.5 million fee. He made his debut for the club on the 21st, coming on as a second-half substitute for Ikechukwu Uche in a 3–0 Europa League play-off victory over Astana, before scoring twice in the return leg at home.

Vietto made his La Liga debut on 24 August, replacing Giovani dos Santos for the last 10 minutes of a 2–0 away win against Valencian rivals Levante UD. On 21 September he scored his first goals in the competition, netting a brace in a 4–2 home win over Rayo Vallecano.

Vietto added another double on 21 December, in a 3–0 win against the Deportivo de La Coruña also at the Estadio El Madrigal. He finished the month with three goals, with his side moving to sixth position, and earning him the honour of La Liga Player of the Month.

=== Atlético Madrid ===
On 22 June 2015, Villarreal confirmed Vietto had joined Atlético Madrid for a fee reported to be in the region of €20 million. Vietto scored his first goal for Atlético on 4 October 2015 as he tapped in a cross from Jackson Martínez to equalize against archrivals Real Madrid in a league match that eventually ended 1–1.

==== Sevilla (loan) ====
On 30 July 2016, Atlético Madrid and Sevilla reached an agreement for the loan of Vietto with an option to buy.

==== Valencia (loan) ====
On 4 January 2018, He signed a loan deal with Valencia for the remainder of the season with an option to buy in the summer. Vietto made his debut against Girona coming on as a sub. In a Copa Del Rey fixture against Las Palmas, Vietto scored his first ever hat-trick in Spain.

==== Fulham (loan) ====
On 9 August 2018, Vietto joined English Premier League club Fulham on a season-long loan. He scored his first and only goal for the club against Brighton in 4–2 win at Craven Cottage.

=== Sporting CP ===
On 14 May 2019, Portuguese club Sporting CP announced they have reached a deal with Atlético Madrid for Vietto worth approximately €7.5 million, effective on 1 July 2019. On 23 September 2019, Vietto scored his first goal for Sporting, the opener of an eventual 2–1 defeat against Famalicão.

=== Al-Hilal ===
On 25 October 2020, Saudi club Al Hilal SFC announced they have reached a deal with Sporting CP for Vietto worth approximately €7 million.

==== Al-Shabab (loan) ====
On 29 January 2022, Vietto joined city rivals Al-Shabab on a six-month loan.

=== Al-Qadsiah ===
On 9 August 2023, Vietto joined Saudi First Division League club Al-Qadsiah on a free transfer.

== International career ==
On 9 January 2013, Vietto made his international debut for the Argentina national under-20 team against Chile at the year's South American Youth Championship. He scored his first goal four days later, but in a 1–2 loss against Paraguay, and finished the tournament with two goals in four games.

== Personal life ==
Vietto is the brother of the footballer Federico Vietto.

== Career statistics ==
As of match played 28 May 2024

Appearances and goals by club, season and competition
Club	Season	League			National cup (Note: Includes Copa Argentina, Copa del Rey, FA Cup, Taça de Portugal, King Cup)		League cup (Note: Includes EFL Cup, Taça da Liga)		Continental		Other		Total	
Club	Season	Division	Apps	Goals	Apps	Goals	Apps	Goals	Apps	Goals	Apps	Goals	Apps	Goals
Racing Club	2011–12	Argentine Primera División	2	0	1	0	—		—		—		3	0
Racing Club	2012–13	Argentine Primera División	32	13	1	0	—		1	0	—		34	13
Racing Club	2013–14	Argentine Primera División	35	5	0	0	—		1	0	—		36	5
Racing Club	Total		69	18	2	0	—		2	0	—		73	18
Villarreal	2014–15	La Liga	32	12	4	0	—		12 (Note: Appearances in UEFA Europa League)	8	—		48	20
Atlético Madrid	2015–16	La Liga	19	1	4	1	—		5 (Note: Appearances in UEFA Champions League)	1	—		28	3
Atlético Madrid	2017–18	La Liga	6	0	2	1	—		2	0	—		10	1
Atlético Madrid	Total		25	1	6	2	—		7	1	—		38	4
Sevilla (loan)	2016–17	La Liga	21	6	3	3	—		4	1	3 (Note: Two appearances in Supercopa de España, one appearance in UEFA Super Cup)	0	31	10
Valencia (loan)	2017–18	La Liga	13	2	5	3	—		–		—		18	5
Fulham (loan)	2018–19	Premier League	20	1	1	0	1	0	–		—		22	1
Sporting CP	2019–20	Primeira Liga	24	4	1	0	3	2	7	2	0	0	35	8
Sporting CP	2020–21	Primeira Liga	3	1	0	0	0	0	2	0	—		5	1
Sporting CP	Total		27	5	1	0	3	2	9	2	0	0	40	9
Al-Hilal	2020–21	Saudi Pro League	27	4	2 (Note: Includes one appearance in 2019–20 King Cup, and one appearance in 2020–21 King Cup)	0	—		6 (Note: Appearance(s) in AFC Champions League)	2	1 (Note: Appearance in Saudi Super Cup)	0	36	6
Al-Hilal	2021–22	Saudi Pro League	13	2	1	1	—		0	0	0	0	14	3
Al-Hilal	2022–23	Saudi Pro League	20	3	3	1	—		2	1	4 (Note: One appearance in Saudi Super Cup, three appearances and three goals in FIFA Club World Cup)	3	29	8
Al-Hilal	Total		60	9	6	2	—		8	3	5	3	79	17
Al-Shabab (loan)	2021–22	Saudi Pro League	7	2	2	0	—		1	0	—		10	2
Al-Qadsiah	2023–24	Saudi First Division League	32	17	1	0	—		—		—		33	17
Career total			306	73	31	10	4	2	43	16	8	3	392	104

== Honours ==
Atlético Madrid

- UEFA Champions League runner-up: 2015–16

Sporting CP

- Primeira Liga: 2020–21

Al Hilal

- Saudi Professional League: 2020–21
- King Cup: 2019–20, 2022–23
- Saudi Super Cup: 2021
- FIFA Club World Cup runner-up: 2022

Al-Qadsiah

- Saudi First Division League: 2023–24

Racing Club

- Copa Sudamericana: 2024
- Recopa Sudamericana: 2025

Individual

- La Liga Player of the Month: December 2014
- UEFA Europa League Top assists: 2014–15
- FIFA Club World Cup Bronze Ball: 2022
