= List of UEFA Super Cup goalscorers =

This article lists every club's goalscorers in the UEFA Super Cup.

== Overall top goalscorers ==
- Years in round brackets, e.g., (2009): Played, but did not score a goal.

Players with at least 3 goals in the UEFA Super Cup^{[a]}
Rank	Player	Team(s)	Goals scored	Matches played	Goal average	Year(s)
1	(Colombia) Radamel Falcao	(Spain) Atlético Madrid	3	1	3.00	2012
1	(Soviet Union) Oleg Blokhin	(Soviet Union) Dynamo Kyiv	3	3	1.00	1975, 1986
1	(England) David Fairclough	(England) Liverpool	3	3	1.00	1977, 1978
1	(England) Terry McDermott	(England) Liverpool	3	3	1.00	1977, (1978)
1	(Germany) Gerd Müller	(Germany) Bayern Munich	3	3	1.00	(1975), 1976
1	(Argentina) Lionel Messi	(Spain) Barcelona	3	4	0.75	(2006), (2009), 2011, 2015
1	(Netherlands) Rob Rensenbrink	(Belgium) Anderlecht	3	4	0.75	1976, 1978
1	(Belgium) François Van der Elst	(Belgium) Anderlecht	3	4	0.75	1976, 1978
1	(Netherlands) Arie Haan	(Netherlands) Ajax (Belgium) Anderlecht	3	6	0.50	1973, 1976, (1978)

== Goalscorers by club ==
Numbers in green means the player finished as the tournament top scorer (or joint top scorer). Years outlined in red indicate host nation status.

=== Aberdeen ===
Player	Goals	1983
(Scotland) Mark McGhee	1	1
(Scotland) Neil Simpson	1	1
Total	2	2

=== Ajax ===
Player	Goals^{[a]}	1973	1987	1995
(Netherlands) Danny Blind	2			2
(Netherlands) Winston Bogarde	1			1
(Nigeria) Finidi George	1			1
(Netherlands) Arie Haan	1	1		
(Netherlands) Piet Keizer	1	1		
(Netherlands) Patrick Kluivert	1			1
(Netherlands) Gerrie Mühren	1	1		
(Netherlands) Jan Mulder	1	1		
(Netherlands) Johan Neeskens	1	1		
(Netherlands) Johnny Rep	1	1		
Total	11	6	0	5

a. Excludes the first competition held in 1972, not organised nor recognised by UEFA as an official title.

=== Anderlecht ===
Player	Goals	1976	1978
(Netherlands) Rob Rensenbrink	3	2	1
(Belgium) François Van der Elst	3	1	2
(Netherlands) Arie Haan	2	2	
(Belgium) Franky Vercauteren	1		1
Total	9	5	4

=== Arsenal ===
Player	Goals	1994
Total	0	0

=== Aston Villa ===
Player	Goals	1982
(England) Gordon Cowans	1	1
(Scotland) Ken McNaught	1	1
(England) Gary Shaw	1	1
Total	3	3

=== Atalanta ===
Player	Goals	2024
Total	0	0

=== Atlético Madrid ===
Player	Goals	2010	2012	2018
(Colombia) Radamel Falcao	3		3	
(Spain) Diego Costa	2			2
(Argentina) Sergio Agüero	1	1		
(Spain) Koke	1			1
(Brazil) Miranda	1		1	
(Spain) José Antonio Reyes	1	1		
(Spain) Saúl	1			1
Total	10	2	4	4

=== Barcelona ===
Player	Goals	1979	1982	1989	1992	1997	2006	2009	2011	2015
(Argentina) Lionel Messi	3								1	2
(Spain) Pedro	2							1		1
(Spain) Marcos Alonso	1		1							
(Spain) Guillermo Amor	1			1						
(Spain) Luis Enrique	1					1				
(Spain) Cesc Fàbregas	1								1	
(Brazil) Giovanni	1					1				
(Spain) Jon Andoni Goikoetxea	1				1					
(Brazil) Rafinha	1									1
(Brazil) Rivaldo	1					1				
(Brazil) Roberto Dinamite	1	1								
(Spain) Julio Salinas	1				1					
(Bulgaria) Hristo Stoichkov	1				1					
(Uruguay) Luis Suárez	1									1
Total	17	1	1	1	3	3	0	1	2	5

=== Bayern Munich ===
Player	Goals	1975	1976	2001	2013	2020
(Germany) Gerd Müller	3		3			
(Spain) Javi Martínez	2				1	1
(Germany) Leon Goretzka	1					1
(Germany) Carsten Jancker	1			1		
(France) Franck Ribéry	1				1	
(Bosnia and Herzegovina) Hasan Salihamidžić	1			1		
Total	9	0	3	2	2	2

=== Borussia Dortmund ===
Player	Goals	1997
(Germany) Jörg Heinrich	1	1
Total	1	1

=== Chelsea ===
Player	Goals	1998	2012	2013	2019	2021
(England) Gary Cahill	1		1			
(France) Olivier Giroud	1				1	
(Belgium) Eden Hazard	1			1		
(Italy) Jorginho	1				1	
(Uruguay) Gus Poyet	1	1				
(Spain) Fernando Torres	1			1		
(Morocco) Hakim Ziyech	1					1
Total	7	1	1	2	2	1

=== CSKA Moscow ===
Player	Goals	2005
(Brazil) Daniel Carvalho	1	1
Total	1	1

=== Dynamo Kyiv ===
Player	Goals	1975	1986
(Soviet Union) Oleg Blokhin	3	3	
Total	3	3	0

=== Eintracht Frankfurt ===
Player	Goals	2022
Total	0	0

=== Feyenoord ===
Player	Goals	2002
(Netherlands) Pierre van Hooijdonk	1	1
Total	1	1

Own goals scored for opponents

- Patrick Paauwe (scored for Real Madrid in 2002)

=== Galatasaray ===
Player	Goals	2000
(Brazil) Mário Jardel	2	2
Total	2	2

=== Hamburger SV ===
Player	Goals	1977	1983
(Germany) Ferdinand Keller	1	1	
Total	1	1	0

=== Inter Milan ===
Player	Goals	2010
Total	0	0

=== Juventus ===
Player	Goals	1984	1996
(Poland) Zbigniew Boniek	2	2	
(Italy) Alessandro Del Piero	2		2
(Italy) Michele Padovano	2		2
(Italy) Nicola Amoruso	1		1
(Italy) Ciro Ferrara	1		1
(Italy) Attilio Lombardo	1		1
(Italy) Sergio Porrini	1		1
(Italy) Christian Vieri	1		1
Total	11	2	9

=== Lazio ===
Player	Goals	1999
(Chile) Marcelo Salas	1	1
Total	1	1

=== Liverpool ===
Player	Goals	1977	1978	1984	2001	2005	2019
(England) David Fairclough	3	2	1				
(England) Terry McDermott	3	3					
(France) Djibril Cissé	2					2	
(Senegal) Sadio Mané	2						2
(England) Jimmy Case	1		1				
(Scotland) Kenny Dalglish	1	1					
(Spain) Luis García	1					1	
(England) Emile Heskey	1				1		
(England) Emlyn Hughes	1		1				
(England) Michael Owen	1				1		
(Norway) John Arne Riise	1				1		
(England) Phil Thompson	1	1					
Total	18	7	3	0	3	3	2

=== Manchester United ===
Player	Goals	1991	1999	2008	2017
(Scotland) Brian McClair	1	1			
(Belgium) Romelu Lukaku	1				1
(Serbia) Nemanja Vidić	1			1	
Total	3	1	0	1	1

=== Mechelen ===
Player	Goals	1988
(Netherlands) John Bosman	2	2
(Belgium) Pascal De Wilde	1	1
Total	3	3

=== Milan ===
Player	Goals	1973	1989	1990	1993	1994	2003	2007
(Italy) Alberigo Evani	2		1	1				
(Croatia) Zvonimir Boban	1					1		
(Italy) Luciano Chiarugi	1	1						
(Netherlands) Ruud Gullit	1			1				
(Italy) Filippo Inzaghi	1							1
(Czech Republic) Marek Jankulovski	1							1
(Brazil) Kaká	1							1
(Italy) Daniele Massaro	1					1		
(France) Jean-Pierre Papin	1				1			
(Netherlands) Frank Rijkaard	1			1				
(Ukraine) Andriy Shevchenko	1						1	
(Netherlands) Marco van Basten	1		1					
Total	13	1	2	3	1	2	1	3

=== Nottingham Forest ===
Player	Goals	1979	1980
(England) Ian Bowyer	2		2
(Scotland) Kenny Burns	1	1	
(England) Charlie George	1	1	
Total	4	2	2

=== Paris Saint-Germain ===
Player	Goals	1996	2025
(Brazil) Raí	2	2	
(South Korea) Lee Kang-in	1		1
(Portugal) Gonçalo Ramos	1		1
Total	4	2	2

=== Parma ===
Player	Goals	1993
(Italy) Massimo Crippa	1	1
(Argentina) Roberto Sensini	1	1
Total	2	2

=== Porto ===
Player	Goals	1987	2003	2004	2011
(Portugal) Rui Barros	1	1			
(Portugal) Ricardo Quaresma	1			1	
(Portugal) António Sousa	1	1			
Total	3	2	0	1	0

=== PSV Eindhoven ===
Player	Goals	1988
(Netherlands) Hans Gillhaus	1	1
Total	1	1

=== Real Madrid ===
Player	Goals	1998	2000	2002	2014	2016	2017	2018	2022	2024
(France) Karim Benzema	2							1	1	
(Spain) Sergio Ramos	2					1		1		
(Portugal) Cristiano Ronaldo	2				2					
(Austria) David Alaba	1								1	
(Spain) Marco Asensio	1					1				
(Spain) Dani Carvajal	1					1				
(Brazil) Casemiro	1						1			
(Spain) Guti	1			1						
(Spain) Isco	1						1			
(France) Kylian Mbappé	1									1
(Spain) Raúl	1		1							
(Brazil) Roberto Carlos	1			1						
(Uruguay) Federico Valverde	1									1
Own goals	1			1						
Total	17	0	1	3	2	3	2	2	2	2

=== Red Star Belgrade ===
Player	Goals	1991
Total	0	0

=== Sampdoria ===
Player	Goals	1990
(Soviet Union) Oleksiy Mykhaylychenko	1	1
Total	1	1

=== Sevilla ===
Player	Goals	2006	2007	2014	2015	2016	2020
(Ukraine) Yevhen Konoplyanka	2				1	1	
(Brazil) Renato	2	1	1				
(Argentina) Éver Banega	1				1		
(France) Kevin Gameiro	1				1		
(Mali) Frédéric Kanouté	1	1					
(Italy) Enzo Maresca	1	1					
(Argentina) Lucas Ocampos	1						1
(Spain) José Antonio Reyes	1				1		
(Argentina) Franco Vázquez	1					1	
Total	11	3	1	0	4	2	1

=== Shakhtar Donetsk ===
Player	Goals	2009
Total	0	0

=== Steaua București ===
Player	Goals	1986
(Romania) Gheorghe Hagi	1	1
Total	1	1

=== Tottenham Hotspur ===
Player	Goals	2025
(Argentina) Cristian Romero	1	1
(Netherlands) Micky van de Ven	1	1
Total	2	2

=== Valencia ===
Player	Goals	1980	2004
(Spain) Rubén Baraja	1		1
(Italy) Marco Di Vaio	1		1
(Argentina) Darío Felman	1	1	
(Uruguay) Fernando Morena	1	1	
Total	4	2	2

=== Villarreal ===
Player	Goals	2021
(Spain) Gerard Moreno	1	1
Total	1	1

=== Werder Bremen ===
Player	Goals	1992
(Germany) Klaus Allofs	1	1
(New Zealand) Wynton Rufer	1	1
Total	2	2

=== Zaragoza ===
Player	Goals	1995
(Spain) Xavi Aguado	1	1
Total	1	1

=== Zenit Saint Petersburg ===
Player	Goals	2008
(Portugal) Danny	1	1
(Russia) Pavel Pogrebnyak	1	1
Total	2	2

== See also ==
- List of Intercontinental Cup goalscorers
