= 2020 UEFA Super Cup =

- Match programme cover
Bayern Munich	Sevilla
(Germany)	(Spain)
2	1
- After extra time
- Date: 24 September 2020
- Venue: Puskás Aréna, Budapest
- Man of the Match: Thomas Müller (Bayern Munich)
- Referee: Anthony Taylor (England)
- Attendance: 15,180
- Weather: Partly cloudy night 20 °C (68 °F); 60% humidity

The 2020 UEFA Super Cup was the 45th edition of the UEFA Super Cup, an annual football match organised by UEFA and contested by the reigning champions of the two main European club competitions, the UEFA Champions League and the UEFA Europa League. The match featured German club Bayern Munich, the winners of the 2019–20 UEFA Champions League, and Spanish club Sevilla, the winners of the 2019–20 UEFA Europa League. It was played at the Puskás Aréna in Budapest, Hungary on 24 September 2020.

The match was originally scheduled to be played at the Estádio do Dragão in Porto, Portugal, on 12 August 2020. However, after the COVID-19 pandemic in Europe caused the postponements of the previous season's club finals, the UEFA Executive Committee chose to award the rescheduled Champions League final to Portugal, and postponed and relocated the Super Cup to Budapest.

Following discussions with its 55 member associations on 19 August 2020, the UEFA Executive Committee decided on 25 August 2020 to use the 2020 UEFA Super Cup as a pilot match for which a reduced number of spectators, up to 30% of the capacity of the stadium, can be allowed in, and it became the first official UEFA match to have spectators since their competitions were resumed in August 2020.

Bayern Munich won the match 2–1 after extra time to secure their second UEFA Super Cup title.

== Teams ==
Team	Qualification	Previous participations (bold indicates winners)
(Germany) Bayern Munich	Winners of the 2019–20 UEFA Champions League	4 (1975, 1976, 2001, **2013**)
(Spain) Sevilla	Winners of the 2019–20 UEFA Europa League	5 (**2006**, 2007, 2014, 2015, 2016)

== Venue ==
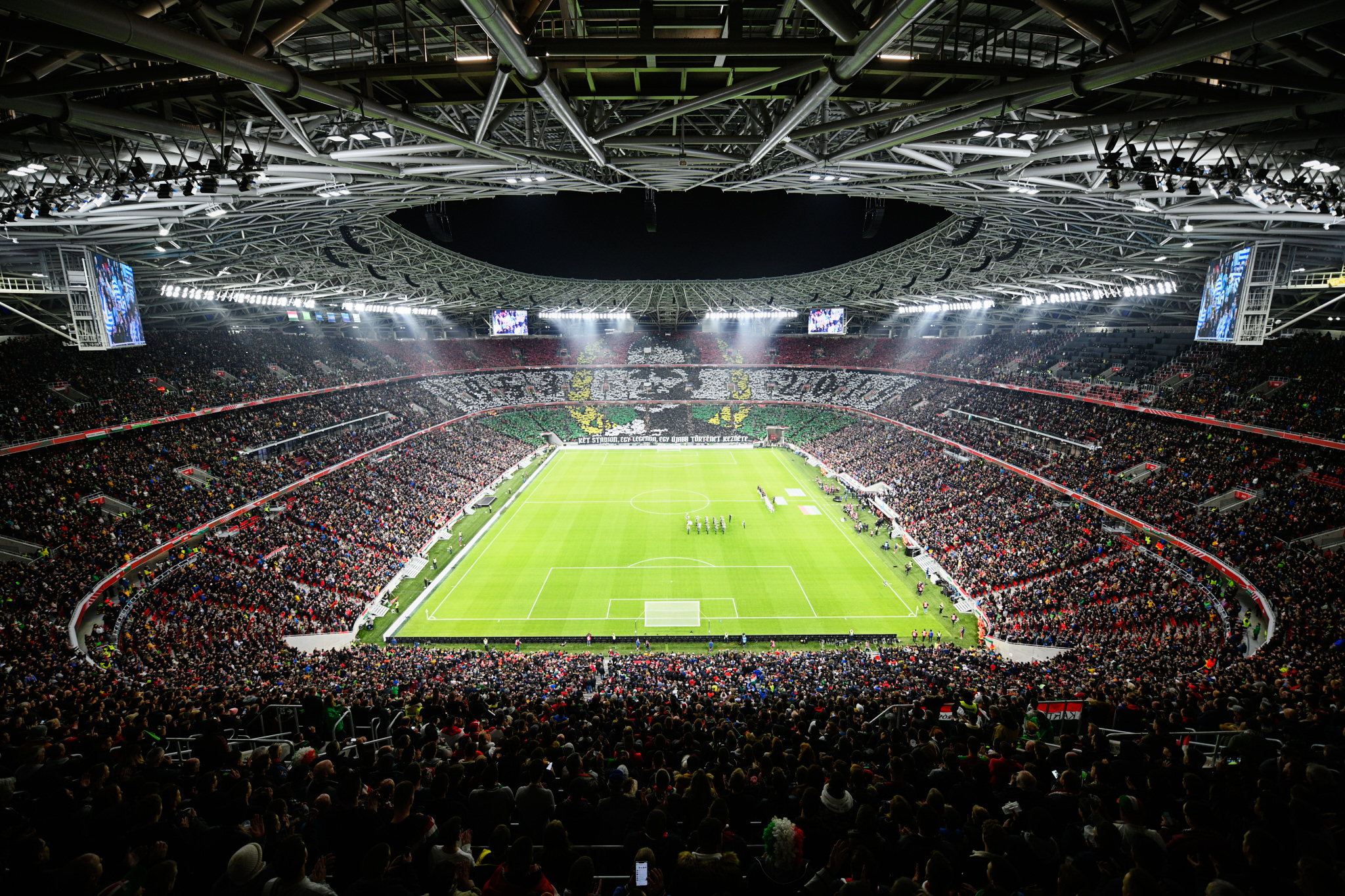
The Puskás Aréna in Budapest hosted the match.

The Estádio do Dragão was scheduled to stage its first ever UEFA Super Cup match. It had hosted the UEFA Euro 2004 and the 2019 UEFA Nations League Final. The city of Porto and Portugal as a whole, however, had seen one Super Cup match before in 1987, as the now-demolished Estádio das Antas hosted the second leg.

This was the first UEFA club competition final hosted at the Puskás Aréna and the second for Budapest and Hungary, having hosted the 2019 UEFA Women's Champions League Final at the Groupama Arena. Prior to the relocation, the stadium had been selected as one of the hosts for the UEFA Euro 2020 as well as hosting the 2022 UEFA Europa League Final, before being rescheduled to 2023.

=== Original host selection ===
An open bidding process was launched on 8 December 2017 by UEFA to select the venue of the UEFA Super Cup in 2020. Associations had until 12 January 2018 to express interest, and bid dossiers had to be submitted by 29 March 2018. Associations hosting matches at UEFA Euro 2020 were not allowed to bid for the 2020 UEFA Super Cup.

UEFA announced on 15 January 2018 that nine associations had expressed interest in hosting the 2020 UEFA Super Cup.

Bidding associations for 2020 UEFA Super Cup
Country	Stadium	City	Capacity	Notes
Albania	Arena Kombëtare	Tirana	22,500	
Belarus	Dinamo Stadium	Minsk	22,000	
Finland	Olympic Stadium	Helsinki	36,000	
France	Allianz Riviera	Nice	35,624	
Israel	Sammy Ofer Stadium	Haifa	30,870	
Kazakhstan	Central Stadium	Almaty	23,804	
Moldova	Zimbru Stadium	Chișinău	10,400	Withdrew, did not submit bid
Northern Ireland	Windsor Park	Belfast	18,434	
Portugal	Estádio do Dragão	Porto	50,033	Also bid for 2020 UEFA Europa League Final

The Estádio do Dragão was selected by the UEFA Executive Committee during their meeting in Kyiv on 24 May 2018.

=== Relocation to Budapest ===
As a result of the COVID-19 pandemic in Europe, the previous season's club finals were postponed and relocated. This includes the 2020 UEFA Champions League Final, which the UEFA Executive Committee moved to the Estádio do Dragão in Porto on 17 June 2020. At the same time, UEFA postponed and relocated the Super Cup from the Estádio do Dragão to the Puskás Aréna in Budapest.

== Pre-match ==
=== Ticketing ===
Tickets were on sale for the general public until 9 September 2020. Moreover, 3,000 tickets were available for the supporters of each team. In total, 15,500 tickets were sold. Strict hygiene measures, including social distancing and wearing of face masks when social distancing could not be respected, were in place during the match. Ticket holders from overseas had to present proof of a negative SARS-CoV-2 PCR test performed within three days of entry, and had to leave the country within 72 hours after their entry.

Despite Hungarian government insisting that the match would be safe to attend, there was opposition to the decision to have spectators. Hungarian politician Ildikó Borbély called the game an "unacceptable experiment", while Minister President of Bavaria Markus Söder urged Bayern fans not to travel, fearing that the match could turn into a "hotbed for COVID-19 to spread". Hungarian Medical Chamber advisor, epidemiologist András Csilek, stated that the Chamber also considered it wrong, saying that it "carries unnecessary risk adding" and "shouldn't be allowed".

=== Officials ===
On 15 September 2020, UEFA named English official Anthony Taylor as the referee for the match. Taylor had been a FIFA referee since 2013, and previously worked as one of the additional assistant referees in the 2014 UEFA Super Cup, 2015 UEFA Europa League Final, 2016 UEFA Champions League Final and UEFA Euro 2016 Final. He was joined by his fellow countrymen, with Gary Beswick and Adam Nunn as assistant referees, Stuart Attwell as the video assistant referee (VAR) and Paul Tierney as the assistant VAR. Israeli referee Orel Grinfeld served as the fourth official.

== Match ==
=== Summary ===
Sevilla were awarded a penalty after 13 minutes when Ivan Rakitić was blocked and bundled over in the penalty area by David Alaba. Lucas Ocampos scored the penalty shooting to the left corner to put Sevilla ahead. Leon Goretzka made it 1–1 in the 34th minute, with a side foot finish to the left corner of the net after a take down assist from Robert Lewandowski. The game went into extra time, with substitute Javi Martínez getting the winner for Bayern in the 104th minute with a powerful header to the top left corner of the net when the ball fell to him, after Sevilla goalkeeper Yassine Bounou had punched the ball back into play.

=== Details ===
The Champions League winners were designated as the "home" team for administrative purposes.

24 September 2020
21:00 UTC+2

Bayern Munich (Germany)	2–1 (a.e.t.)	(Spain) Sevilla
Goretzka 34'; Martínez 104'	Report	Ocampos 13' (pen.)

Puskás Aréna, Budapest
Attendance: 15,180
Referee: Anthony Taylor (England)

**Bayern Munich**	**Sevilla**

GK	**1**	(Germany) Manuel Neuer (c)
RB	**5**	(France) Benjamin Pavard
CB	**21**	(France) Lucas Hernandez	(yellow card) 90+1'	(substituted off) 99'
CB	**4**	(Germany) Niklas Süle
LB	**27**	(Austria) David Alaba	(yellow card) 12'	(substituted off) 112'
CM	**18**	(Germany) Leon Goretzka		(substituted off) 99'
CM	**6**	(Germany) Joshua Kimmich
RW	**7**	(Germany) Serge Gnabry
AM	**25**	(Germany) Thomas Müller
LW	**10**	(Germany) Leroy Sané		(substituted off) 70'
CF	**9**	(Poland) Robert Lewandowski
Substitutes:
GK	**26**	(Germany) Sven Ulreich
GK	**35**	(Germany) Alexander Nübel
DF	**17**	(Germany) Jérôme Boateng		(substituted on) 112'
DF	**41**	(United States) Chris Richards
MF	**8**	(Spain) Javi Martínez		(substituted on) 99'
MF	**11**	(France) Michaël Cuisance
MF	**19**	(Canada) Alphonso Davies		(substituted on) 99'
MF	**24**	(France) Corentin Tolisso		(substituted on) 70'
MF	**30**	(Germany) Adrian Fein
MF	**40**	(Germany) Malik Tillman
MF	**42**	(England) Jamal Musiala
FW	**14**	(Netherlands) Joshua Zirkzee
Other disciplinary actions:
TS	(Bosnia and Herzegovina) Hasan Salihamidžić		(yellow card) 64'
Manager:
(Germany) Hansi Flick

GK	**13**	(Morocco) Yassine Bounou
RB	**16**	(Spain) Jesús Navas (c)
CB	**20**	(Brazil) Diego Carlos
CB	**12**	(France) Jules Koundé	(yellow card) 55'
LB	**18**	(Spain) Sergio Escudero	(yellow card) 119'
CM	**8**	(Spain) Joan Jordán	(yellow card) 45+1'	(substituted off) 94'
CM	**25**	(Brazil) Fernando	(yellow card) 70'
CM	**10**	(Croatia) Ivan Rakitić		(substituted off) 56'
RF	**7**	(Spain) Suso		(substituted off) 73'
CF	**9**	(Netherlands) Luuk de Jong		(substituted off) 56'
LF	**5**	(Argentina) Lucas Ocampos
Substitutes:
GK	**1**	(Czech Republic) Tomáš Vaclík
GK	**31**	(Spain) Javi Díaz
DF	**3**	(Spain) Sergi Gómez
MF	**6**	(Serbia) Nemanja Gudelj		(substituted on) 73'
MF	**14**	(Spain) Óscar
MF	**19**	(Argentina) Marcos Acuña
MF	**21**	(Spain) Óliver Torres		(substituted on) 56'
MF	**22**	(Argentina) Franco Vázquez		(substituted on) 94'
FW	**11**	(Spain) Munir
FW	**15**	(Morocco) Youssef En-Nesyri		(substituted on) 56'
FW	**24**	(Spain) Carlos Fernández
FW	**29**	(Spain) Bryan Gil
Other disciplinary actions:
TS	(Spain) Pablo Sanz		(yellow card) 90+2'
Manager:
(Spain) Julen Lopetegui

Man of the Match:
Thomas Müller (Bayern Munich)

Assistant referees:
Gary Beswick (England)
Adam Nunn (England)
Fourth official:
Orel Grinfeld (Israel)
Video assistant referee:
Stuart Attwell (England)
Assistant video assistant referee:
Paul Tierney (England)

**Match rules**

- 90 minutes
- 30 minutes of extra time if necessary
- Penalty shoot-out if scores still level
- Twelve named substitutes
- Maximum of three substitutions, with a fourth allowed in extra time

=== Statistics ===
First half
Statistic	Bayern Munich	Sevilla
Goals scored	1	1
Total shots	7	1
Shots on target	2	1
Saves	0	1
Ball possession	62%	38%
Corner kicks	2	0
Fouls committed	5	7
Offsides	1	1
Yellow cards	1	1
Red cards	0	0

Second half
Statistic	Bayern Munich	Sevilla
Goals scored	0	0
Total shots	8	3
Shots on target	2	3
Saves	3	2
Ball possession	60%	40%
Corner kicks	5	5
Fouls committed	7	6
Offsides	1	2
Yellow cards	1	2
Red cards	0	0

Extra time
Statistic	Bayern Munich	Sevilla
Goals scored	1	0
Total shots	10	2
Shots on target	3	1
Saves	1	2
Ball possession	59%	41%
Corner kicks	3	1
Fouls committed	3	4
Offsides	1	0
Yellow cards	0	1
Red cards	0	0

Overall
Statistic	Bayern Munich	Sevilla
Goals scored	2	1
Total shots	25	6
Shots on target	7	5
Saves	4	5
Ball possession	60%	40%
Corner kicks	10	6
Fouls committed	15	17
Offsides	3	3
Yellow cards	2	4
Red cards	0	0

== See also ==
- 2020 UEFA Champions League final
- 2020 UEFA Europa League final
- 2020–21 UEFA Champions League
- 2020–21 UEFA Europa League
- 2020–21 FC Bayern Munich season
- 2020–21 Sevilla FC season
- FC Bayern Munich in international football
- Sevilla FC in European football
