= Spanish football clubs in international competitions =

Football clubs from La Liga (Spanish top tier) have won a record 73 continental and worldwide titles. Real Madrid, the most successful of them, have won the European Cup (now known as the UEFA Champions League) on fifteen separate occasions and claimed 32 trophies in total. Barcelona have won twenty continental and worldwide titles, while Atlético Madrid have claimed eight. Sevilla have won eight and Valencia have seven trophies to their name. Additionally, Deportivo La Coruña have been regulars in the UEFA Champions League, while Athletic Bilbao, Espanyol, Alavés, Zaragoza and Mallorca have all contested major finals in second-tier competitions and below. Smaller La Liga clubs, like Villarreal, Celta Vigo and Málaga have also found success in Europe, reaching the latter stages of the Champions League and winning the Europa League, as is the case with Villarreal.

During the 2005–06 European season, La Liga became the first league to have its clubs win both the Champions League and UEFA Cup since 1997, as Barcelona won the UEFA Champions League and Sevilla won the UEFA Cup. This feat was repeated four times in five seasons: during the 2013–14 season Real Madrid won their tenth Champions League title and Sevilla won their third Europa League, during the 2014–15 season Barcelona won their fifth Champions League title and Sevilla won their fourth Europa League, during the 2015–16 season Real Madrid won their eleventh Champions League title and Sevilla won their fifth Europa League (becoming the first team to win the title three times in a row), and during the 2017–18 season Real Madrid won their thirteenth Champions League title and Atlético Madrid won their third Europa League.

Real Madrid won the European Cup five times in a row between 1956 and 1960. La Liga clubs also dominated the early Inter-Cities Fairs Cup. Barcelona, Valencia and Zaragoza won this competition six times between 1958 and 1966, resulting in three all-La Liga finals in 1962, 1964 and 1966.

== Spain's dominance in Europe since 2000 ==
Since the turn of the century, La Liga clubs have dominated Europe. In 2000, La Liga had three out of the four semi-finalists in the UEFA Champions League with Real Madrid, Valencia and Barcelona; Real Madrid went on to beat fellow La Liga side Valencia in an all-Spanish final, the first Champions League final between two sides from the same country.

In 2001, La Liga had two out of the four semi-finalists in the UEFA Champions League, with Real Madrid and Valencia. Valencia went on to lose the final again, this time to Bayern Munich. Meanwhile, in the UEFA Cup, La Liga had two out of the four semi-finalists, with Barcelona and Alavés, with Liverpool defeating both sides in the semi-finals and final, respectively.

In 2002, La Liga had two out of the four semi-finalists in the UEFA Champions League with Real Madrid beating Barcelona in the semi-finals, then defeating Bayer Leverkusen in the final for a record ninth title.

In 2003, Real Madrid reached the semi-finals again but this time lost against Juventus. Barcelona and Valencia had been eliminated in the quarter-finals, both by Italian opposition.

In 2004, Deportivo La Coruña reached the semi-finals, knocking out defending champions AC Milan in the quarter-finals, but lost to eventual winners Porto. In the UEFA Cup, La Liga had two out of the four semi-finalists. Valencia beat Villarreal in the semi-finals before defeating Marseille in the final to win their first UEFA Cup title.

In 2006, La Liga had two out of the four semi-finalists in the UEFA Champions League once again with Barcelona and Villarreal; Barcelona went on to become European champions for a second time by beating Arsenal 2–1 in the final. Meanwhile, in the UEFA Cup, Sevilla followed in Barcelona's footsteps by beating a Premier League side in a European final when they defeated Middlesbrough 4–0. With Barcelona and Sevilla, La Liga took home both European trophies on offer in 2006. Sevilla went on to beat Barcelona 3–0 in the all-Spanish 2006 UEFA Super Cup.

2007 was another successful year for La Liga; in the UEFA Cup they had three out of the four semi-finalists with Sevilla, Espanyol and Osasuna. Sevilla beat Osasuna 2–1 on aggregate, while Espanyol beat German side Werder Bremen 5–1 on aggregate, to set up an all-Spanish UEFA Cup final. In a pulsating match, Adriano gave Sevilla the lead only for Albert Riera to equalise for Espanyol; in the second half Espanyol went down to 10 men, giving Sevilla an extra incentive to take the lead, which they did in extra time through Frédéric Kanouté. But a dramatic late equaliser in the second period of extra time from Espanyol's Jonatas took the match to penalties, which Sevilla won for their second UEFA Cup title. In their second consecutive UEFA Super Cup appearance, Sevilla went on to lose 3–1 to AC Milan.

In 2009, Barcelona won the Champions League for a third time, defeating Manchester United in the final 2–0 as part of a first-ever Spanish treble and later a sextuple, becoming the first European side to win six trophies in a calendar year. Among these titles were the UEFA Super Cup which they won 1–0 over Shakhtar Donetsk, and the FIFA Club World Cup which they won 2–1 against Estudiantes.

In 2010, Atlético Madrid would win the first edition of the newly named UEFA Europa League, overcoming fellow La Liga side Valencia in the quarter-finals, Liverpool in the semi-finals, and defeating Fulham in the final 2–1 after extra time. This was their first European trophy in 48 years. This was followed up by a 2–0 victory over European champions Inter Milan in the 2010 UEFA Super Cup.

In 2011, Barcelona won their fourth Champions League title, two years after the third. They defeated rivals Real Madrid 3–1 on aggregate in an El Clásico semi-final, before once again defeating Manchester United in the final, by a score of 3–1. As in 2009, Barcelona then went on to lift both the UEFA Super Cup and Club World Cup, winning against Porto and Santos, respectively. That same season, Villarreal reached the semi-finals of the Europa League, beating Napoli, Bayer Leverkusen, and Twente, before being eliminated by eventual winners Porto.

Atlético Madrid won the Europa League for a second time in 2012, following a 3–0 victory in an all-Spanish final against Athletic Bilbao. Atlético reached the final after beating Italian clubs Udinese and Lazio, and overcoming Valencia once again in the semi-finals, who had previously beaten Dutch clubs PSV Eindhoven and AZ. Athletic Bilbao had reached the final by eliminating Manchester United 5–3 in the round of 16 on aggregate, as well as Schalke 04 and Sporting CP in the quarter and semi-finals, respectively. Atlético went on to win a second UEFA Super Cup, after defeating Chelsea 4–1.

In the 2013–14 season, other than Real Sociedad who were eliminated from the Champions League in the group stage, all Spanish clubs in both the Champions League and the Europa League were only eliminated by fellow Spanish clubs. In the Champions League, Barcelona were eliminated by Atlético Madrid in the quarter-final stage with a 1–2 aggregate loss. Atlético went on to eliminate Chelsea in the semi-finals before losing in the final against Real Madrid. Real had reached the final by eliminating three German clubs in succession (Schalke 04, Borussia Dortmund and defending champions Bayern Munich). In the Europa League round of 16, Sevilla and Real Betis were paired for a European version of the Derbi Sevillano, which was won by Sevilla on penalties. After eliminating Porto, Sevilla faced Valencia in the semi-final, winning the first leg 2–0 while losing the return leg 1–3, advancing on away goals thanks to a 94th-minute header by Stéphane Mbia. Sevilla would go on to defeat Benfica on penalties in the final, winning a third UEFA Cup title. In the all-Spanish UEFA Super Cup, Real Madrid defeated Sevilla 2–0.

The nigh excellent performances of Spanish clubs in European competitions continued into the 2014–15 season. The Spanish UEFA coefficient ranking also continued to comfortably lead the rest of the European leagues by a considerable margin. Both major UEFA finals had Spanish teams participating once again as Barcelona and Sevilla made it into the Champions League and Europa League finals respectively. Barcelona would defeat Italian champions Juventus in the final 3–1, becoming the first European side to win two trebles, while Sevilla overcame Dnipro 3–2 for their second consecutive Europa League title. In the 2015 UEFA Super Cup, Barcelona emerged victorious against Sevilla, winning 5–4 in extra time. They also won a then-record third Club World Cup, after a 3–0 win over River Plate.

Both major UEFA competitions would once again be won by La Liga sides in the 2015–16 season as Spanish clubs continued to dominate. Sevilla were again the Europa League winners, completing a historic hat-trick of Europa League titles on the bounce, while at the same time further cementing their position as the most successful European club in that particular competition, with five victories in total. They beat English club Liverpool in the final 3–1. The English side had previously eliminated Villarreal in the semi-finals. Moreover, the Champions League was even more dominated by Spanish clubs. Atlético Madrid, after eliminating fellow Spanish club and defending European champions Barcelona 3–2 on aggregate in the quarter-finals, caused a further upset by eliminating Bavarian giants Bayern Munich in the semi-finals. On 28 May, they faced city rivals Real Madrid for the second time in a Champions League final in three years. The game finished 1–1, and Real Madrid won their eleventh Champions League title after emerging on top after a penalty shoot-out.

The 2016–17 season saw Real Madrid become the first side in the Champions League era to defend their title. After a 3–2 extra time victory over Sevilla in the 2016 UEFA Super Cup, Real eliminated Napoli, Bayern Munich and fellow Spanish semi-finalists Atlético Madrid in the Champions League knockout stage, before defeating Juventus 4–1 in the final. Although no Spanish side reached the final of the Europa League that season, Celta Vigo managed to make the semi-finals, where they were narrowly eliminated 2–1 on aggregate by eventual winners Manchester United.

== Cups and finals ==
=== Official competitions ===
==== European competitions ====
===== European Cup / UEFA Champions League =====
| Club | Winners | Runners-up | Years won | Years runner-up |
|---|---|---|---|---|
| Real Madrid | 15 | 3 | 1956, 1957, 1958, 1959, 1960, 1966, 1998, 2000, 2002, 2014, 2016, 2017, 2018, 2022, 2024 | 1962, 1964, 1981 |
| Barcelona | 5 | 3 | 1992, 2006, 2009, 2011, 2015 | 1961, 1986, 1994 |
| Atlético Madrid | 0 | 3 | — | 1974, 2014, 2016 |
| Valencia | 0 | 2 | — | 2000, 2001 |

===== UEFA Cup / UEFA Europa League =====
| Club | Winners | Runners-up | Years won | Years runner-up |
|---|---|---|---|---|
| Sevilla | 7 | 0 | 2006, 2007, 2014, 2015, 2016, 2020, 2023 | — |
| Atlético Madrid | 3 | 0 | 2010, 2012, 2018 | — |
| Real Madrid | 2 | 0 | 1985, 1986 | — |
| Valencia | 1 | 0 | 2004 | — |
| Villarreal | 1 | 0 | 2021 | — |
| Athletic Bilbao | 0 | 2 | — | 1977, 2012 |
| Espanyol | 0 | 2 | — | 1988, 2007 |
| Alavés | 0 | 1 | — | 2001 |

===== UEFA Conference League =====
| Club | Winners | Runners-up | Years won | Years runner-up |
|---|---|---|---|---|
| Real Betis | 0 | 1 | — | 2025 |
| Rayo Vallecano | 0 | 1 | — | 2026 |

===== European Cup Winners' Cup / UEFA Cup Winners' Cup =====
| Club | Winners | Runners-up | Years won | Years runner-up |
|---|---|---|---|---|
| Barcelona | 4 | 2 | 1979, 1982, 1989, 1997 | 1969, 1991 |
| Atlético Madrid | 1 | 2 | 1962 | 1963, 1986 |
| Valencia | 1 | 0 | 1980 | — |
| Zaragoza | 1 | 0 | 1995 | — |
| Real Madrid | 0 | 2 | — | 1971, 1983 |
| Mallorca | 0 | 1 | — | 1999 |

===== European Super Cup / UEFA Super Cup =====
| Club | Winners | Runners-up | Years won | Years runner-up |
|---|---|---|---|---|
| Real Madrid | 6 | 3 | 2002, 2014, 2016, 2017, 2022, 2024 | 1998, 2000, 2018 |
| Barcelona | 5 | 4 | 1992, 1997, 2009, 2011, 2015 | 1979, 1982, 1989, 2006 |
| Atlético Madrid | 3 | 0 | 2010, 2012, 2018 | — |
| Valencia | 2 | 0 | 1980, 2004 | — |
| Sevilla | 1 | 6 | 2006 | 2007, 2014, 2015, 2016, 2020, 2023 |
| Zaragoza | 0 | 1 | — | 1995 |
| Villarreal | 0 | 1 | — | 2021 |

===== UEFA Intertoto Cup =====
| Club | Winners | Runners-up | Years won | Years runner-up |
|---|---|---|---|---|
| Villarreal | 2 | 1 | 2003, 2004 | 2002 |
| Valencia | 1 | 1 | 1998 | 2005 |
| Celta Vigo | 1 | 0 | 2000 | — |
| Málaga | 1 | 0 | 2002 | — |
| Atlético Madrid | 0 | 1 | — | 2004 |
| Deportivo La Coruña | 0 | 1 | – | 2005 |

===== Inter-Cities Fairs Cup =====
| Club | Winners | Runners-up | Years won | Years runner-up |
|---|---|---|---|---|
| Barcelona | 3 | 1 | 1958, 1960, 1966 | 1962 |
| Valencia | 2 | 1 | 1962, 1963 | 1964 |
| Zaragoza | 1 | 1 | 1964 | 1966 |

==== Worldwide competitions ====
===== Intercontinental Cup =====
| Club | Winners | Runners-up | Years won | Years runner-up |
|---|---|---|---|---|
| Real Madrid | 3 | 2 | 1960, 1998, 2002 | 1966, 2000 |
| Atlético Madrid | 1 | 0 | 1974 | — |
| Barcelona | 0 | 1 | — | 1992 |

===== FIFA Club World Cup =====
| Club | Winners | Runners-up | Years won | Years runner-up |
|---|---|---|---|---|
| Real Madrid | 5 | 0 | 2014, 2016, 2017, 2018, 2022 | — |
| Barcelona | 3 | 1 | 2009, 2011, 2015 | 2006 |

===== FIFA Intercontinental Cup =====
| Club | Winners | Runners-up | Years won | Years runner-up |
|---|---|---|---|---|
| Real Madrid | 1 | 0 | 2024 | — |

=== Non-UEFA/FIFA competitions ===
==== Latin Cup ====
| Club | Winners | Runners-up | Years won | Years runner-up |
|---|---|---|---|---|
| Barcelona | 2 | 0 | 1949, 1952 | — |
| Real Madrid | 2 | 0 | 1955, 1957 | — |
| Athletic Bilbao | 0 | 1 | — | 1956 |

== Spanish teams in European finals ==
=== UEFA Champions League (formerly known as European Champion Clubs' Cup or European Cup) ===
| Season | Winners | Score | Runners-up | Venue |
|---|---|---|---|---|
| 1955–56; Details | (Spain) Real Madrid | 4–3 | (France) Reims | Parc des Princes, Paris |
| 1956–57; Details | (Spain) Real Madrid | 2–0 | (Italy) Fiorentina | Santiago Bernabéu, Madrid |
| 1957–58; Details | (Spain) Real Madrid | 3–2 (a.e.t.) | (Italy) Milan | Heysel Stadium, Brussels |
| 1958–59; Details | (Spain) Real Madrid | 2–0 | (France) Reims | Neckarstadion, Stuttgart |
| 1959–60; Details | (Spain) Real Madrid | 7–3 | (West Germany) Eintracht Frankfurt | Hampden Park, Glasgow |
| 1960–61; Details | (Portugal) Benfica | 3–2 | (Spain) Barcelona | Wankdorf Stadium, Bern |
| 1961–62; Details | (Portugal) Benfica | 5–3 | (Spain) Real Madrid | Olympisch Stadion, Amsterdam |
| 1963–64; Details | (Italy) Inter Milan | 3–1 | (Spain) Real Madrid | Prater Stadium, Vienna |
| 1965–66; Details | (Spain) Real Madrid | 2–1 | (Socialist Federal Republic of Yugoslavia) Partizan | Heysel Stadium, Brussels |
| 1973–74; Details | (West Germany) Bayern Munich | 1–1 (a.e.t.) | (Spain) Atlético Madrid | Heysel Stadium, Brussels |
| 1973–74; Details | (West Germany) Bayern Munich | 4–0 (replay) | (Spain) Atlético Madrid | Heysel Stadium, Brussels |
| 1973–74; Details | Bayern Munich won 4–0 on a replay match, after the first match was drawn 1–1 after extra time. | | | |
| 1980–81; Details | (England) Liverpool | 1–0 | (Spain) Real Madrid | Parc des Princes, Paris |
| 1985–86; Details | (Romania) Steaua București | 0–0 (a.e.t.) | (Spain) Barcelona | Ramón Sánchez Pizjuán, Seville |
| 1985–86; Details | Steaua București won 2–0 on penalties. | | | |
| 1991–92; Details | (Spain) Barcelona | 1–0 (a.e.t.) | (Italy) Sampdoria | Wembley Stadium, London |
| 1993–94; Details | (Italy) Milan | 4–0 | (Spain) Barcelona | Olympic Stadium Spiros Louis, Athens |
| 1997–98; Details | (Spain) Real Madrid | 1–0 | (Italy) Juventus | Amsterdam Arena, Amsterdam |
| 1999–2000; Details | (Spain) Real Madrid | 3–0 | (Spain) Valencia | Stade de France, Saint-Denis |
| 2000–01; Details | (Germany) Bayern Munich | 1–1 (a.e.t.) | (Spain) Valencia | San Siro, Milan |
| 2000–01; Details | Bayern Munich won 5–4 on penalties. | | | |
| 2001–02; Details | (Spain) Real Madrid | 2–1 | (Germany) Bayer Leverkusen | Hampden Park, Glasgow |
| 2005–06; Details | (Spain) Barcelona | 2–1 | (England) Arsenal | Stade de France, Saint-Denis |
| 2008–09; Details | (Spain) Barcelona | 2–0 | (England) Manchester United | Stadio Olimpico, Rome |
| 2010–11; Details | (Spain) Barcelona | 3–1 | (England) Manchester United | Wembley Stadium, London |
| 2013–14; Details | (Spain) Real Madrid | 4–1 (a.e.t.) | (Spain) Atlético Madrid | Estádio da Luz, Lisbon |
| 2014–15; Details | (Spain) Barcelona | 3–1 | (Italy) Juventus | Olympiastadion, Berlin |
| 2015–16; Details | (Spain) Real Madrid | 1–1 (a.e.t.) | (Spain) Atlético Madrid | San Siro, Milan |
| 2015–16; Details | Real Madrid won 5–3 on penalties. | | | |
| 2016–17; Details | (Spain) Real Madrid | 4–1 | (Italy) Juventus | Millennium Stadium, Cardiff |
| 2017–18; Details | (Spain) Real Madrid | 3–1 | (England) Liverpool | NSC Olimpiyskiy Stadium, Kyiv |
| 2021–22; Details | (Spain) Real Madrid | 1–0 | (England) Liverpool | Stade de France, Saint-Denis |
| 2023–24; Details | (Spain) Real Madrid | 2–0 | (Germany) Borussia Dortmund | Wembley Stadium, London |

a.e.t. = after extra time

=== UEFA Cup Winners' Cup (formerly known as European Cup Winners' Cup) (Defunct) ===
| Season | Winners | Score | Runners-up | Venue |
|---|---|---|---|---|
| 1961–62; Details | (Spain) Atlético Madrid | 1–1 (a.e.t.) | (Italy) Fiorentina | Hampden Park, Glasgow |
| 1961–62; Details | (Spain) Atlético Madrid | 3–0 (replay) | (Italy) Fiorentina | Gottlieb-Daimler-Stadion, Stuttgart |
| 1961–62; Details | Atlético Madrid won 3–0 in a replay match, after the first match was drawn 1–1 after extra time. | | | |
| 1962–63; Details | (England) Tottenham Hotspur | 5–1 | (Spain) Atlético Madrid | De Kuip, Rotterdam |
| 1968–69; Details | (Czechoslovakia) Slovan Bratislava | 3–2 | (Spain) Barcelona | St. Jakob Stadium, Basel |
| 1970–71; Details | (England) Chelsea | 1–1 (a.e.t.) | (Spain) Real Madrid | Karaiskákis Stadium, Piraeus |
| 1970–71; Details | (England) Chelsea | 2–1 (a.e.t.) (replay) | (Spain) Real Madrid | Karaiskákis Stadium, Piraeus |
| 1970–71; Details | Chelsea won 2–1 on a replay match, after the first match was drawn 1–1 after extra time. | | | |
| 1978–79; Details | (Spain) Barcelona | 4–3 (a.e.t.) | (West Germany) Fortuna Düsseldorf | St. Jakob Stadium, Basel |
| 1979–80; Details | (Spain) Valencia | 0–0 (a.e.t.) | (England) Arsenal | Heysel Stadium, Brussels |
| 1979–80; Details | Valencia won 5–4 on penalties. | | | |
| 1981–82; Details | (Spain) Barcelona | 2–1 | (Belgium) Standard Liège | Camp Nou, Barcelona |
| 1982–83; Details | (Scotland) Aberdeen | 2–1 (a.e.t.) | (Spain) Real Madrid | Nya Ullevi, Gothenburg |
| 1985–86; Details | (Soviet Union) Dynamo Kyiv | 3–0 | (Spain) Atlético Madrid | Stade de Gerland, Lyon |
| 1988–89; Details | (Spain) Barcelona | 2–0 | (Italy) Sampdoria | Wankdorf Stadium, Bern |
| 1990–91; Details | (England) Manchester United | 2–1 | (Spain) Barcelona | De Kuip, Rotterdam |
| 1994–95; Details | (Spain) Zaragoza | 2–1 (a.e.t.) | (England) Arsenal | Parc des Princes, Paris |
| 1996–97; Details | (Spain) Barcelona | 1–0 | (France) Paris Saint-Germain | De Kuip, Rotterdam |
| 1998–99; Details | (Italy) Lazio | 2–1 | (Spain) Mallorca | Villa Park, Birmingham |

a.e.t. – after extra time

=== UEFA Europa League (formerly known as UEFA Cup) ===
| Season | Home team | Score | Away team | Venue |
|---|---|---|---|---|
| 1976–77; Details | (Italy) Juventus | 1–0 | (Spain) Athletic Bilbao | Stadio Comunale, Turin |
| 1976–77; Details | (Spain) Athletic Bilbao | 2–1 | (Italy) Juventus | San Mamés, Bilbao |
| 1976–77; Details | Aggregate 2–2; Juventus won on away goals. | | | |
| 1984–85; Details | (Hungary) Videoton | 0–3 | (Spain) Real Madrid | Stadion Sóstói, Székesfehérvár |
| 1984–85; Details | (Spain) Real Madrid | 0–1 | (Hungary) Videoton | Santiago Bernabéu, Madrid |
| 1984–85; Details | Real Madrid won 3–1 on aggregate. | | | |
| 1985–86; Details | (Spain) Real Madrid | 5–1 | (West Germany) 1. FC Köln | Santiago Bernabéu, Madrid |
| 1985–86; Details | (West Germany) 1. FC Köln | 2–0 | (Spain) Real Madrid | Olympiastadion, Berlin |
| 1985–86; Details | Real Madrid won 5–3 on aggregate. | | | |
| 1987–88; Details | (Spain) Espanyol | 3–0 | (West Germany) Bayer Leverkusen | Estadi de Sarrià, Barcelona |
| 1987–88; Details | (West Germany) Bayer Leverkusen | 3–0 (a.e.t.) | (Spain) Espanyol | Ulrich Haberland Stadion, Leverkusen |
| 1987–88; Details | Aggregate 3–3; Bayer Leverkusen won 3–2 on penalties. | | | |
| Season | Winners | Score | Runners-up | Venue |
| 2000–01; Details | (England) Liverpool | 5–4 (a.e.t.) | (Spain) Alavés | Westfalenstadion, Dortmund |
| 2000–01; Details | Liverpool won in extra time by golden goal. | | | |
| 2003–04; Details | (Spain) Valencia | 2–0 | (France) Marseille | Nya Ullevi, Gothenburg |
| 2005–06; Details | (Spain) Sevilla | 4–0 | (England) Middlesbrough | Philips Stadion, Eindhoven |
| 2006–07; Details | (Spain) Sevilla | 2–2 (a.e.t.) | (Spain) Espanyol | Hampden Park, Glasgow |
| 2006–07; Details | Sevilla won 3–1 on penalties. | | | |
| 2009–10; Details | (Spain) Atlético Madrid | 2–1 (a.e.t.) | (England) Fulham | HSH Nordbank Arena, Hamburg |
| 2011–12; Details | (Spain) Atlético Madrid | 3–0 | (Spain) Athletic Bilbao | Arena Națională, Bucharest |
| 2013–14; Details | (Spain) Sevilla | 0–0 (a.e.t.) | (Portugal) Benfica | Juventus Stadium, Turin |
| 2013–14; Details | Sevilla won 4–2 on penalties. | | | |
| 2014–15; Details | (Spain) Sevilla | 3–2 | (Ukraine) Dnipro | Stadion Narodowy, Warsaw |
| 2015–16; Details | (Spain) Sevilla | 3–1 | (England) Liverpool | St. Jakob-Park, Basel |
| 2017–18; Details | (Spain) Atlético Madrid | 3–0 | (France) Marseille | Parc Olympique Lyonnais, Lyon |
| 2019–20; Details | (Spain) Sevilla | 3–2 | (Italy) Inter Milan | RheinEnergieStadion, Cologne |
| 2020–21; Details | (Spain) Villarreal | 1–1 (a.e.t.) | (England) Manchester United | Stadion Miejski, Gdańsk |
| 2020–21; Details | Villarreal won 11–10 on penalties. | | | |
| 2022–23; Details | (Spain) Sevilla | 1–1 (a.e.t.) | (Italy) Roma | Puskás Aréna, Budapest |
| 2022–23; Details | Sevilla won 4–1 on penalties. | | | |

a.e.t. – after extra time

=== UEFA Conference League ===
| Season | Winners | Score | Runners-up | Venue |
|---|---|---|---|---|
| 2024–25; Details | (England) Chelsea | 4–1 | (Spain) Real Betis | Wrocław Stadium, Wrocław |
| 2025–26; Details | (England) Crystal Palace | 1–0 | (Spain) Rayo Vallecano | Red Bull Arena, Leipzig |

=== UEFA Super Cup (formerly known as European Super Cup) ===
| Season | Home team | Score | Away team | Venue |
|---|---|---|---|---|
| 1979 | (England) Nottingham Forest ^{CL} | 1–0 | (Spain) Barcelona ^{CWC} | City Ground, West Bridgford |
| 1979 | (Spain) Barcelona ^{CWC} | 1–1 | (England) Nottingham Forest ^{CL} | Camp Nou, Barcelona |
| 1979 | Nottingham Forest won 2–1 on aggregate. | | | |
| 1980 | (England) Nottingham Forest ^{CL} | 2–1 | (Spain) Valencia ^{CWC} | City Ground, West Bridgford |
| 1980 | (Spain) Valencia ^{CWC} | 1–0 | (England) Nottingham Forest ^{CL} | Estadio Luís Casanova, Valencia |
| 1980 | Aggregate 2–2; Valencia won on away goals. | | | |
| 1982 | (Spain) Barcelona ^{CWC} | 1–0 | (England) Aston Villa ^{CL} | Camp Nou, Barcelona |
| 1982 | (England) Aston Villa ^{CL} | 3–0 (a.e.t.) | (Spain) Barcelona ^{CWC} | Villa Park, Witton |
| 1982 | Aston Villa won 3–1 on aggregate. | | | |
| 1989 | (Spain) Barcelona ^{CWC} | 1–1 | (Italy) Milan ^{CL} | Camp Nou, Barcelona |
| 1989 | (Italy) Milan ^{CL} | 1–0 | (Spain) Barcelona ^{CWC} | San Siro, Milan |
| 1989 | Milan won 2–1 on aggregate. | | | |
| 1992 | (Germany) Werder Bremen ^{CWC} | 1–1 | (Spain) Barcelona ^{CL} | Weserstadion, Bremen |
| 1992 | (Spain) Barcelona ^{CL} | 2–1 | (Germany) Werder Bremen ^{CWC} | Camp Nou, Barcelona |
| 1992 | Barcelona won 3–2 on aggregate. | | | |
| 1995 | (Spain) Zaragoza ^{CWC} | 1–1 | (Netherlands) Ajax ^{CL} | La Romareda, Zaragoza |
| 1995 | (Netherlands) Ajax ^{CL} | 4–0 | (Spain) Zaragoza ^{CWC} | Olympisch Stadion, Amsterdam |
| 1995 | Ajax won 5–1 on aggregate. | | | |
| 1997 | (Spain) Barcelona ^{CWC} | 2–0 | (Germany) Borussia Dortmund ^{CL} | Camp Nou, Barcelona |
| 1997 | (Germany) Borussia Dortmund ^{CL} | 1–1 | (Spain) Barcelona ^{CWC} | Westfalenstadion, Dortmund |
| 1997 | Barcelona won 3–1 on aggregate. | | | |
| Season | Winners | Score | Runners-up | Venue |
| 1998 | (England) Chelsea ^{CWC} | 1–0 | (Spain) Real Madrid ^{CL} | Stade Louis II, Monaco |
| 2000 | (Turkey) Galatasaray ^{EL} | 2–1 (a.e.t.) | (Spain) Real Madrid ^{CL} | Stade Louis II, Monaco |
| 2000 | Galatasaray won in extra time by golden goal. | | | |
| 2002 | (Spain) Real Madrid ^{CL} | 3–1 | (Netherlands) Feyenoord ^{EL} | Stade Louis II, Monaco |
| 2004 | (Spain) Valencia ^{EL} | 2–1 | (Portugal) Porto ^{CL} | Stade Louis II, Monaco |
| 2006 | (Spain) Sevilla ^{EL} | 3–0 | (Spain) Barcelona ^{CL} | Stade Louis II, Monaco |
| 2007 | (Italy) Milan ^{CL} | 3–1 | (Spain) Sevilla ^{EL} | Stade Louis II, Monaco |
| 2009 | (Spain) Barcelona ^{CL} | 1–0 (a.e.t.) | (Ukraine) Shakhtar Donetsk ^{EL} | Stade Louis II, Monaco |
| 2010 | (Spain) Atlético Madrid ^{EL} | 2–0 | (Italy) Inter Milan ^{CL} | Stade Louis II, Monaco |
| 2011 | (Spain) Barcelona ^{CL} | 2–0 | (Portugal) Porto ^{EL} | Stade Louis II, Monaco |
| 2012 | (Spain) Atlético Madrid ^{EL} | 4–1 | (England) Chelsea ^{CL} | Stade Louis II, Monaco |
| 2014 | (Spain) Real Madrid ^{CL} | 2–0 | (Spain) Sevilla ^{EL} | Cardiff City Stadium, Cardiff |
| 2015 | (Spain) Barcelona ^{CL} | 5–4 (a.e.t.) | (Spain) Sevilla ^{EL} | Boris Paichadze Dinamo Arena, Tbilisi |
| 2016 | (Spain) Real Madrid ^{CL} | 3–2 (a.e.t.) | (Spain) Sevilla ^{EL} | Lerkendal Stadion, Trondheim |
| 2017 | (Spain) Real Madrid ^{CL} | 2–1 | (England) Manchester United ^{EL} | Philip II Arena, Skopje |
| 2018 | (Spain) Atlético Madrid ^{EL} | 4–2 (a.e.t.) | (Spain) Real Madrid ^{CL} | A. Le Coq Arena, Tallinn |
| 2020 | (Germany) Bayern Munich ^{CL} | 2–1 (a.e.t.) | (Spain) Sevilla ^{EL} | Puskás Aréna, Budapest |
| 2021 | (England) Chelsea ^{CL} | 1–1 (a.e.t.) | (Spain) Villarreal ^{EL} | Windsor Park, Belfast |
| 2021 | Chelsea won 6–5 on penalties. | | | |
| 2022 | (Spain) Real Madrid ^{CL} | 2–0 | (Germany) Eintracht Frankfurt ^{EL} | Olympic Stadium, Helsinki |
| 2023 | (England) Manchester City ^{CL} | 1–1 | (Spain) Sevilla ^{EL} | Karaiskakis Stadium, Piraeus |
| 2023 | Manchester City won 5–4 on penalties. | | | |
| 2024 | (Spain) Real Madrid ^{CL} | 2–0 | (Italy) Atalanta ^{EL} | National Stadium, Warsaw |

CL – Winner of European Cup/UEFA Champions League
CWC – Winner of UEFA Cup Winners' Cup
EL – Winner of UEFA Cup/Europa League
a.e.t. – after extra time

=== UEFA Intertoto Cup (formerly known as International Football Cup, non-UEFA until 1995) (Defunct) ===
| Season | Home | Score | Away | Venue |
|---|---|---|---|---|
| 1968 ^{a} Details | (Spain) Espanyol (3–1), Group 5 winner against (Germany) 1860 Munich (3–1) and Austria Wien (0–4). | | | |
| 1998 ^{b} Details | Austria Salzburg | 0–2 | (Spain) Valencia | Red Bull Arena Wals-Siezenheim, Salzburg |
| 1998 ^{b} Details | (Spain) Valencia | 2–1 | Austria Salzburg | Mestalla, Valencia |
| 1998 ^{b} Details | Valencia won 4–1 on aggregate. | | | |
| 2000 ^{b} Details | (Spain) Celta Vigo | 2–1 | (Russia) Zenit Saint Petersburg | Balaídos, Vigo |
| 2000 ^{b} Details | (Russia) Zenit Saint Petersburg | 2–2 | (Spain) Celta Vigo | Petrovsky Stadium, Saint Petersburg |
| 2000 ^{b} Details | Celta Vigo won 4–3 on aggregate. | | | |
| 2002 ^{b} Details | (Spain) Villarreal | 0–1 | (Spain) Málaga | El Madrigal, Villareal |
| 2002 ^{b} Details | (Spain) Málaga | 1–1 | (Spain) Villarreal | Estadio La Rosaleda, Málaga |
| 2002 ^{b} Details | Málaga won 2–1 on aggregate. | | | |
| 2003 ^{b} Details | (Netherlands) Heerenveen | 1–2 | (Spain) Villarreal | Abe Lenstra Stadion, Heerenveen |
| 2003 ^{b} Details | (Spain) Villarreal | 0–0 | (Netherlands) Heerenveen | El Madrigal, Villarreal |
| 2003 ^{b} Details | Villarreal won 2–1 on aggregate. | | | |
| 2004 ^{b} Details | (Spain) Villarreal | 2–0 | (Spain) Atlético Madrid | El Madrigal, Villarreal |
| 2004 ^{b} Details | (Spain) Atlético Madrid | 2–0 | (Spain) Villarreal | Estadio Vicente Calderón, Madrid |
| 2004 ^{b} Details | Aggregate 2–2; Villarreal won 3–1 on penalties. | | | |
| 2005 ^{b} Details | (Spain) Deportivo La Coruña | 2–0 | (France) Marseille | Estadio Riazor, A Coruña |
| 2005 ^{b} Details | (France) Marseille | 5–1 | (Spain) Deportivo La Coruña | Stade Vélodrome, Marseille |
| 2005 ^{b} Details | Marseille won 5–3 on aggregate. | | | |
| 2005 ^{b} Details | (Germany) Hamburger SV | 1–0 | (Spain) Valencia | Imtech Arena, Hamburg |
| 2005 ^{b} Details | (Spain) Valencia | 0–0 | (Germany) Hamburger SV | Estadio Mestalla, Valencia |
| 2005 ^{b} Details | Hamburger SV won 1–0 on aggregate. | | | |
| 2006 ^{c} Details | (Spain) Villarreal | 1–2 | (Slovenia) Maribor | El Madrigal, Villarreal |
| 2006 ^{c} Details | (Slovenia) Maribor | 1–1 | (Spain) Villarreal | Ljudski vrt, Maribor |
| 2006 ^{c} Details | Maribor won 3–2 on aggregate. | | | |
| 2007 ^{c} Details | (Romania) Gloria Bistrița | 2–1 | (Spain) Atlético Madrid | Stadionul Jean Pădureanu, Bistrița |
| 2007 ^{c} Details | (Spain) Atlético Madrid | 1–0 | (Romania) Gloria Bistrița | Vicente Calderón, Madrid |
| 2007 ^{c} Details | Aggregate 2–2; Atlético Madrid won on away goals. | | | |
| 2008 ^{c} Details | (Israel) Bnei Sakhnin | 1–2 | (Spain) Deportivo La Coruña | Kiryat Eliezer Stadium, Haifa |
| 2008 ^{c} Details | (Spain) Deportivo La Coruña | 1–0 | (Israel) Bnei Sakhnin | Estadio Riazor, A Coruña |
| 2008 ^{c} Details | Deportivo La Coruña won 3–1 on aggregate. | | | |

a. https://web.archive.org/web/20080914062804/http://www.uefa.com/competitions/intertotocup/index.html

=== Inter-Cities Fairs Cup (Defunct) ===
| Season | Home | Score | Away | Venue |
|---|---|---|---|---|
| 1955–58; Details | (England) London XI | 2–2 | (Spain) Barcelona XI (represented by FC Barcelona) | Stamford Bridge, London |
| 1955–58; Details | (Spain) Barcelona XI (represented by FC Barcelona) | 6–0 | (England) London XI | Camp Nou, Barcelona |
| 1955–58; Details | Barcelona XI won 8–2 on aggregate. | | | |
| 1958–60; Details | (England) Birmingham City | 0–0 | (Spain) Barcelona | St Andrews, Birmingham |
| 1958–60; Details | (Spain) Barcelona | 4–1 | (England) Birmingham City | Camp Nou, Barcelona |
| 1958–60; Details | Barcelona won 4–1 on aggregate. | | | |
| 1961–62; Details | (Spain) Valencia | 6–2 | (Spain) Barcelona | Luis Casanova Stadium, Valencia |
| 1961–62; Details | (Spain) Barcelona | 1–1 | (Spain) Valencia | Camp Nou, Barcelona |
| 1961–62; Details | Valencia won 7–3 on aggregate. | | | |
| 1962–63; Details | (Socialist Federal Republic of Yugoslavia) Dinamo Zagreb | 1–2 | (Spain) Valencia | Maksimir, Zagreb |
| 1962–63; Details | (Spain) Valencia | 2–0 | (Socialist Federal Republic of Yugoslavia) Dinamo Zagreb | Luis Casanova Stadium, Valencia |
| 1962–63; Details | Valencia won 4–1 on aggregate. | | | |
| 1963–64; Details | (Spain) Zaragoza | 2–1 | (Spain) Valencia | Camp Nou, Barcelona |
| 1963–64; Details | Zaragoza won after a single match final was played. | | | |
| 1965–66; Details | (Spain) Barcelona | 0–1 | (Spain) Zaragoza | Camp Nou, Barcelona |
| 1965–66; Details | (Spain) Zaragoza | 2–4 (a.e.t.) | (Spain) Barcelona | La Romareda, Zaragoza |
| 1965–66; Details | Barcelona won 4–3 on aggregate. | | | |
| 1971; Trophy Play-Off | (Spain) Barcelona | 2–1 | (England) Leeds United | Camp Nou, Barcelona |
| 1971; Trophy Play-Off | Barcelona (3-times winner) won this single match trophy play-off against Leeds United, winner of the last edition of the competition. | | | |

a.e.t. – after extra time

=== Latin Cup (Defunct) ===
| Year | Final | | | Venue |
| Year | Winners | Score | Runners-up | Venue |
|---|---|---|---|---|
| 1949 | (Spain) Barcelona | 2–1 | (Portugal) Sporting CP | Estadio Chamartín, Madrid, Spain |
| 1952 | (Spain) Barcelona | 1–0 | (France) Nice | Parc des Princes, Paris, France |
| 1955 | (Spain) Real Madrid | 2–0 | (France) Reims | Parc des Princes, Paris, France |
| 1956 | (Italy) Milan | 3–1 | (Spain) Athletic Bilbao | San Siro, Milan, Italy |
| 1957 | (Spain) Real Madrid | 1–0 | (Portugal) Benfica | Santiago Bernabéu, Madrid, Spain |

a.e.t. – after extra time

== Spanish teams in worldwide finals ==
=== Intercontinental Cup ===
| Season | Home team | Score | Away team | Venue |
|---|---|---|---|---|
| 1960; Details | (Uruguay) Peñarol | 0–0 | (Spain) Real Madrid | Estadio Centenario, Montevideo |
| 1960; Details | (Spain) Real Madrid | 5–1 | (Uruguay) Peñarol | Santiago Bernabéu, Madrid |
| 1960; Details | Real Madrid won with 3 points. | | | |
| 1966; Details | (Uruguay) Peñarol | 2–0 | (Spain) Real Madrid | Estadio Centenario, Montevideo |
| 1966; Details | (Spain) Real Madrid | 0–2 | (Uruguay) Peñarol | Santiago Bernabéu, Madrid |
| 1966; Details | Peñarol won with 4 points. | | | |
| 1974; Details | (Argentina) Independiente | 1–0 | (Spain) Atlético Madrid | Estadio Almirante Cordero, Avellaneda |
| 1974; Details | (Spain) Atlético Madrid | 2–0 | (Argentina) Independiente | Vicente Calderón, Madrid |
| 1974; Details | Atlético Madrid won 2–1 on aggregate. | | | |
| 1992; Details | (Brazil) São Paulo | 2–1 | (Spain) Barcelona | National Stadium, Tokyo |
| 1998; Details | (Spain) Real Madrid | 2–1 | (Brazil) Vasco da Gama | National Stadium, Tokyo |
| 2000; Details | (Argentina) Boca Juniors | 2–1 | (Spain) Real Madrid | National Stadium, Tokyo |
| 2002; Details | (Spain) Real Madrid | 2–0 | (Paraguay) Olimpia | International Stadium, Yokohama |

=== FIFA Club World Cup ===
| Season | Winners | Score | Runners-up | Venue |
|---|---|---|---|---|
| 2006; Details | (Brazil) Internacional | 1–0 | (Spain) Barcelona | International Stadium, Yokohama |
| 2009; Details | (Spain) Barcelona | 2–1 (a.e.t.) | (Argentina) Estudiantes | Zayed Sports City Stadium, Abu Dhabi |
| 2011; Details | (Spain) Barcelona | 4–0 | (Brazil) Santos | International Stadium, Yokohama |
| 2014; Details | (Spain) Real Madrid | 2–0 | (Argentina) San Lorenzo | Stade de Marrakech, Marrakesh |
| 2015; Details | (Spain) Barcelona | 3–0 | (Argentina) River Plate | International Stadium, Yokohama |
| 2016; Details | (Spain) Real Madrid | 4–2 (a.e.t.) | (Japan) Kashima Antlers | International Stadium, Yokohama |
| 2017; Details | (Spain) Real Madrid | 1–0 | (Brazil) Grêmio | Zayed Sports City Stadium, Abu Dhabi |
| 2018; Details | (Spain) Real Madrid | 4–1 | (United Arab Emirates) Al-Ain | Zayed Sports City Stadium, Abu Dhabi |
| 2022; Details | (Spain) Real Madrid | 5–3 | (Saudi Arabia) Al-Hilal | Prince Moulay Abdellah Stadium, Rabat |

a.e.t. – after extra time

=== FIFA Intercontinental Cup ===
| Season | Winners | Score | Runners-up | Venue |
|---|---|---|---|---|
| 2024; Details | (Spain) Real Madrid | 3–0 | (Mexico) Pachuca | Lusail Stadium, Lusail |
