= 2018 UEFA Super Cup =

- Match programme cover
| Real Madrid | Atlético Madrid |
| (Spain) | (Spain) |
| 2 | 4 |
- After extra time
- Date: 15 August 2018
- Venue: Lilleküla Stadium, Tallinn
- Man of the Match: Diego Costa (Atlético Madrid)
- Referee: Szymon Marciniak (Poland)
- Attendance: 12,424
- Weather: Partly cloudy 18 °C (64 °F); 71% humidity

The 2018 UEFA Super Cup was the 43rd edition of the UEFA Super Cup, an annual football match organised by UEFA and contested by the reigning champions of the two main European club competitions, the UEFA Champions League and the UEFA Europa League. The match featured two Spanish sides, two-time defending champions Real Madrid, the winners of the 2017–18 UEFA Champions League, and Atlético Madrid, the winners of the 2017–18 UEFA Europa League, setting up a Madrid derby, making it another time 2 teams from the same country faced each other, and the first time 2 teams from the same city clashed. It was played at the Lilleküla Stadium in Tallinn, Estonia, on 15 August 2018, and was the first European club final held in Estonia.

In March 2018, UEFA announced that a fourth substitution would be allowed in extra time and that the number of eligible substitutes had been increased from 7 to 12. The kick-off time was also changed from 20:45 CEST to 21:00 CEST.

Atlético Madrid won the match 4–2 after extra time for their third UEFA Super Cup title. As of 2026, it is the most recent UEFA Super Cup to have been won by the Europa League winner.

== Teams ==
| Team | Qualification | Previous participation (bold indicates winners) |
|---|---|---|
| (Spain) Real Madrid^{TH} | Winners of the 2017–18 UEFA Champions League | 6 (1998, 2000, **2002**, **2014**, **2016**, **2017**) |
| (Spain) Atlético Madrid | Winners of the 2017–18 UEFA Europa League | 2 (**2010**, **2012**) |

This was the fifth all-Spanish Super Cup, and the fourth in the last five years. This was also the first Super Cup to be played by two teams from the same city. A Spanish side has appeared in the Super Cup for nine of the previous ten years. Additionally, as both teams were from Spain, the Super Cup was guaranteed to be won by a Spanish team for the ninth time in ten seasons and for five consecutive years.

Real Madrid were aiming to win their fifth Super Cup, which would tie them with record-holders Barcelona and Milan, while having won the last two editions, have the chance to become the first team to win three consecutive Super Cups. On the other hand, Atlético Madrid, having won the previous two Super Cups they played in, had the chance to become the first team to win their first three Super Cups.

This was the tenth Madrid Derby match in European competitions, with all previous nine matches having been in the European Cup/UEFA Champions League. Real Madrid held the advantage with 5 wins, 2 draws and 2 defeats, and have never been knocked out by Atlético Madrid either over two legs or in a one-match decider.

== Venue ==
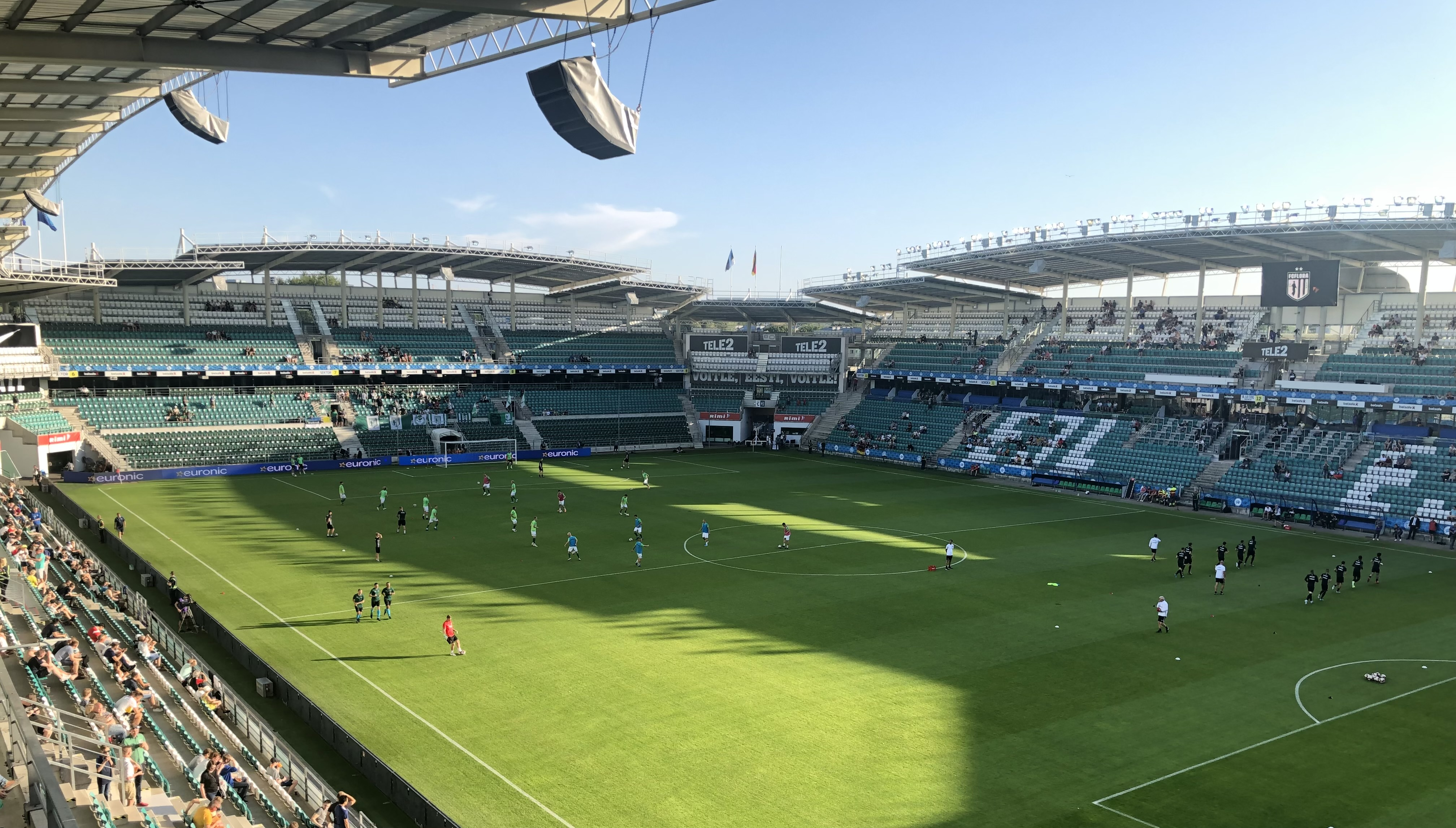
The Lilleküla Stadium in Tallinn

The Lilleküla Stadium was announced as the final venue on 15 September 2016, following the decision of the UEFA Executive Committee meeting in Athens, Greece. The stadium was known as the "Lilleküla Arena" due to UEFA's sponsorship regulations.

== Pre-match ==
=== Ticketing ===
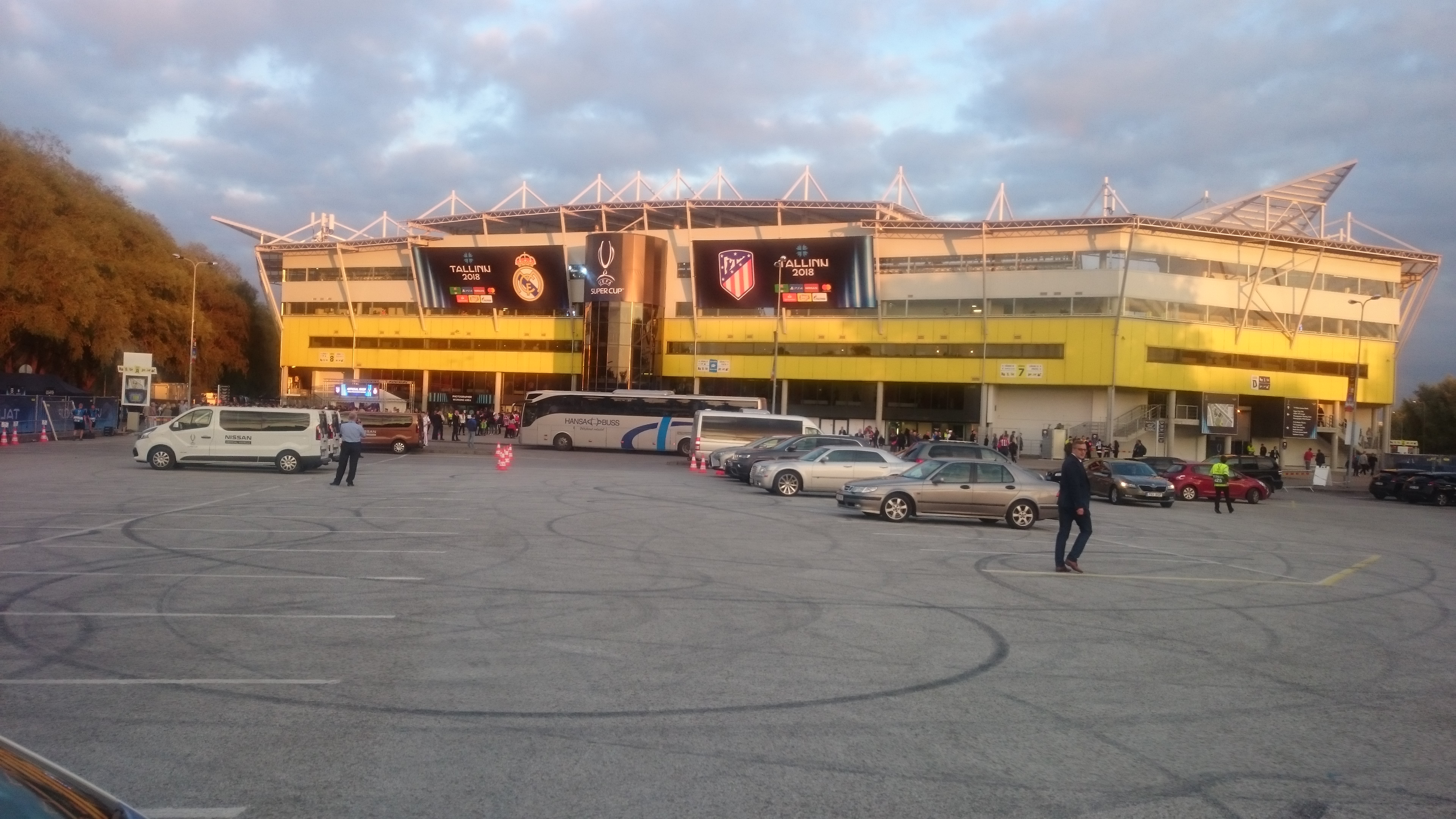
The Lilleküla Stadium in matchday.

With a stadium capacity of 13,000 for the match, around 70% of the tickets were available to fans and the general public, available for sale to fans worldwide via UEFA.com from 5 to 26 June 2018 in three price categories: €130, €90, and €50. The remaining tickets were allocated to the local organising committee, UEFA and national associations, commercial partners and broadcasters.

=== Officials ===
On 2 August 2018, UEFA announced that Szymon Marciniak of Poland would officiate the match. Marciniak has been a FIFA referee since 2011, and officiated at UEFA Euro 2016 and the 2018 FIFA World Cup. He was joined by his fellow countrymen, with Paweł Sokolnicki and Tomasz Listkiewicz as assistant referees, Paweł Raczkowski and Tomasz Musiał as additional assistant referees, and Radosław Siejka as reserve assistant referee. The fourth official for the match was Romanian Ovidiu Hațegan.

== Match ==
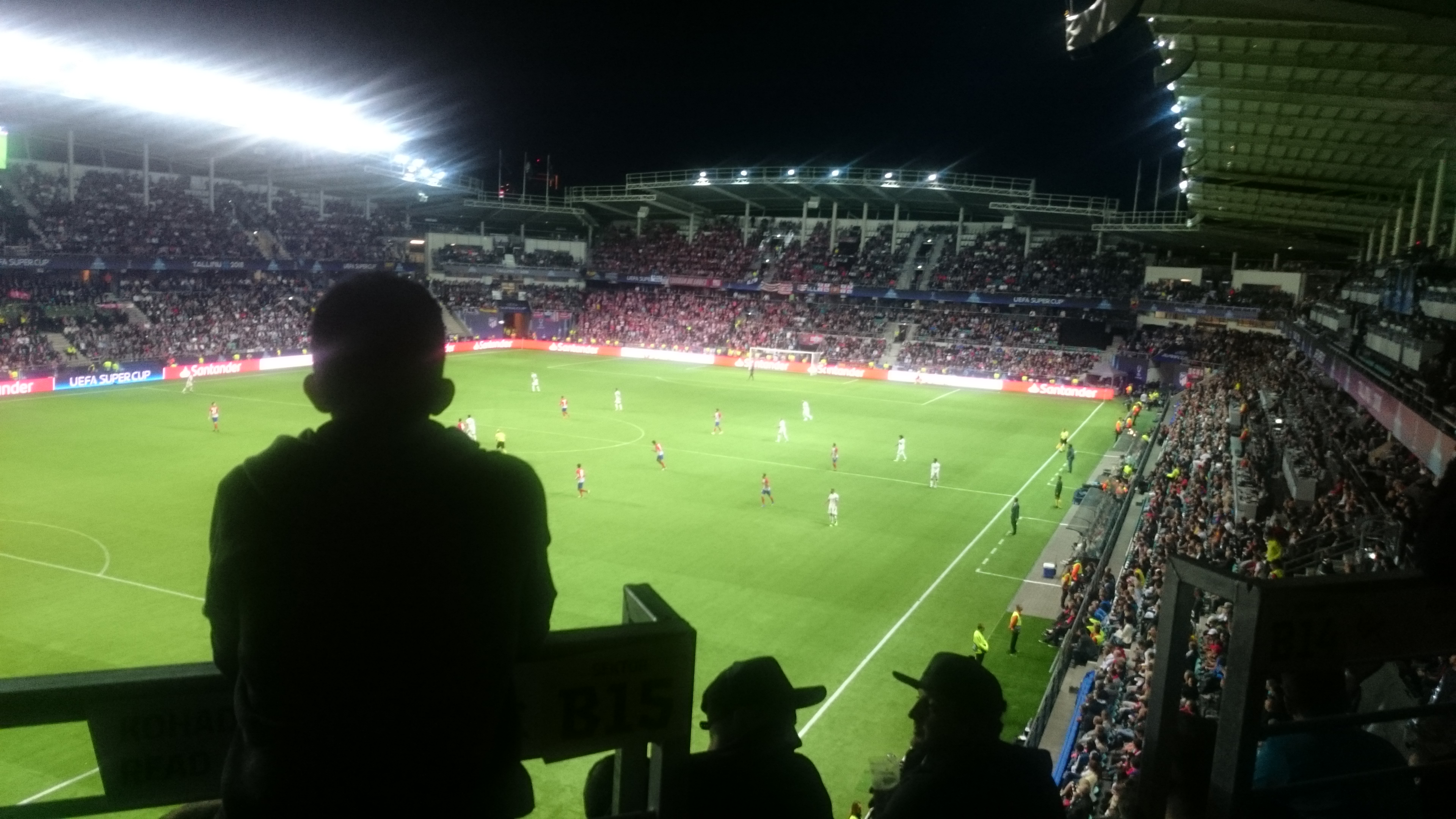
The match

=== Details ===
The Champions League winners were designated as the "home" team for administrative purposes.

15 August 2018
22:00 UTC+3

| Real Madrid (Spain) | 2–4 (a.e.t.) | (Spain) Atlético Madrid |
|---|---|---|
| Benzema 27'; Ramos 63' (pen.) | Report | Costa 1', 79'; Saúl 98'; Koke 104' |

Lilleküla Stadium, Tallinn
Attendance: 12,424
Referee: Szymon Marciniak (Poland)

| Real Madrid | Atlético Madrid |

| GK | 1 | (Costa Rica) Keylor Navas |
| RB | 2 | (Spain) Dani Carvajal |
| CB | 4 | (Spain) Sergio Ramos (c) | (yellow card) 112' |
| CB | 5 | (France) Raphaël Varane |
| LB | 12 | (Brazil) Marcelo | (yellow card) 54' |
| DM | 14 | (Brazil) Casemiro | | (substituted off) 76' |
| CM | 8 | (Germany) Toni Kroos | | (substituted off) 102' |
| CM | 22 | (Spain) Isco | | (substituted off) 83' |
| RF | 11 | (Wales) Gareth Bale |
| CF | 9 | (France) Karim Benzema |
| LF | 20 | (Spain) Marco Asensio | (yellow card) 35' | (substituted off) 57' |
Substitutes:
| GK | 13 | (Spain) Kiko Casilla |
| GK | 26 | (Ukraine) Andriy Lunin |
| DF | 6 | (Spain) Nacho |
| DF | 29 | (Spain) Sergio Reguilón |
| DF | 31 | (Spain) Javi Sánchez |
| MF | 10 | (Croatia) Luka Modrić | (yellow card) 101' | (substituted on) 57' |
| MF | 18 | (Spain) Marcos Llorente |
| MF | 24 | (Spain) Dani Ceballos | (yellow card) 90+1' | (substituted on) 76' |
| MF | 27 | (Uruguay) Federico Valverde |
| FW | 17 | (Spain) Lucas Vázquez | | (substituted on) 83' |
| FW | 21 | (Spain) Borja Mayoral | | (substituted on) 102' |
| FW | 28 | (Brazil) Vinícius Júnior |
Manager:
(Spain) Julen Lopetegui

| GK | 13 | (Slovenia) Jan Oblak |
| RB | 20 | (Spain) Juanfran |
| CB | 15 | (Montenegro) Stefan Savić |
| CB | 2 | (Uruguay) Diego Godín (c) |
| LB | 21 | (France) Lucas Hernandez |
| RM | 11 | (France) Thomas Lemar | | (substituted off) 90+1' |
| CM | 14 | (Spain) Rodri | | (substituted off) 71' |
| CM | 8 | (Spain) Saúl |
| LM | 6 | (Spain) Koke |
| CF | 19 | (Spain) Diego Costa | (yellow card) 62' | (substituted off) 109' |
| CF | 7 | (France) Antoine Griezmann | | (substituted off) 57' |
Substitutes:
| GK | 1 | (Spain) Antonio Adán |
| GK | 37 | (Spain) Álex dos Santos |
| DF | 3 | (Brazil) Filipe Luís |
| DF | 4 | (Colombia) Santiago Arias |
| DF | 24 | (Uruguay) José Giménez | | (substituted on) 109' |
| MF | 5 | (Ghana) Thomas Partey | | (substituted on) 90+1' |
| MF | 18 | (Portugal) Gelson Martins |
| MF | 23 | (Spain) Vitolo | (yellow card) 105+3' | (substituted on) 71' |
| MF | 30 | (Spain) Roberto Olabe |
| FW | 9 | (Croatia) Nikola Kalinić |
| FW | 10 | (Argentina) Ángel Correa | (yellow card) 60' | (substituted on) 57' |
Manager:
(Argentina) Germán Burgos (Note: Atlético Madrid manager Diego Simeone was given a four-match touchline ban in UEFA competitions following the 2017–18 UEFA Europa League semi-final first leg. Assistant manager Germán Burgos filled in as manager.)

Man of the Match:
Diego Costa (Atlético Madrid)

Assistant referees:
Paweł Sokolnicki (Poland)
Tomasz Listkiewicz (Poland)
Fourth official:
Ovidiu Hațegan (Romania)
Additional assistant referees:
Paweł Raczkowski (Poland)
Tomasz Musiał (Poland)
Reserve assistant referee:
Radosław Siejka (Poland)

Match rules

- 90 minutes.
- 30 minutes of extra time if necessary.
- Penalty shoot-out if scores still level.
- Twelve named substitutes.
- Maximum of three substitutions, with a fourth allowed in extra time.

=== Statistics ===
First half
| Statistic | Real Madrid | Atlético Madrid |
|---|---|---|
| Goals scored | 1 | 1 |
| Total shots | 6 | 3 |
| Shots on target | 2 | 2 |
| Saves | 1 | 1 |
| Ball possession | 59% | 41% |
| Corner kicks | 2 | 3 |
| Fouls committed | 7 | 6 |
| Offsides | 0 | 0 |
| Yellow cards | 1 | 0 |
| Red cards | 0 | 0 |

Second half
| Statistic | Real Madrid | Atlético Madrid |
|---|---|---|
| Goals scored | 1 | 1 |
| Total shots | 5 | 2 |
| Shots on target | 2 | 1 |
| Saves | 0 | 1 |
| Ball possession | 46% | 54% |
| Corner kicks | 3 | 0 |
| Fouls committed | 10 | 8 |
| Offsides | 1 | 2 |
| Yellow cards | 2 | 2 |
| Red cards | 0 | 0 |

Extra time
| Statistic | Real Madrid | Atlético Madrid |
|---|---|---|
| Goals scored | 0 | 2 |
| Total shots | 3 | 3 |
| Shots on target | 2 | 2 |
| Saves | 0 | 1 |
| Ball possession | 59% | 41% |
| Corner kicks | 7 | 1 |
| Fouls committed | 8 | 3 |
| Offsides | 0 | 0 |
| Yellow cards | 2 | 1 |
| Red cards | 0 | 0 |

Overall
| Statistic | Real Madrid | Atlético Madrid |
|---|---|---|
| Goals scored | 2 | 4 |
| Total shots | 14 | 8 |
| Shots on target | 6 | 5 |
| Saves | 1 | 3 |
| Ball possession | 54% | 46% |
| Corner kicks | 12 | 4 |
| Fouls committed | 25 | 17 |
| Offsides | 1 | 2 |
| Yellow cards | 5 | 3 |
| Red cards | 0 | 0 |

== See also ==
- 2014 UEFA Champions League final – contested by the same sides
- 2016 UEFA Champions League final – contested by the same sides
- 2018 UEFA Champions League final
- 2018 UEFA Europa League final
- 2018–19 UEFA Champions League
- 2018–19 UEFA Europa League
- 2018–19 Atlético Madrid season
- 2018–19 Real Madrid CF season
- Atlético Madrid in European football
- Real Madrid CF in international football
- Spanish football clubs in international competitions
