= Daniel Carriço =

Portuguese footballer (born 1988)

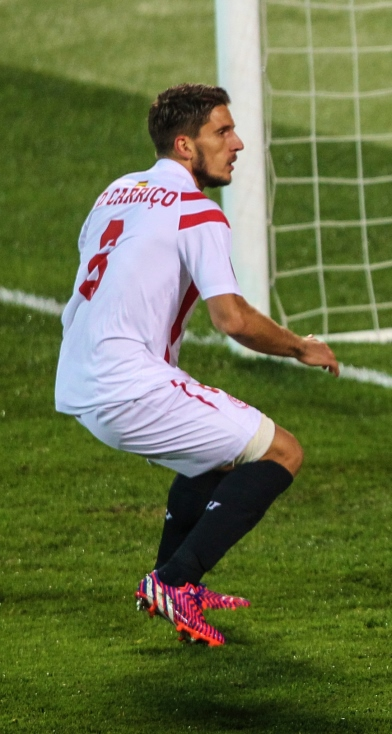
- Carriço with Sevilla in 2015

Personal information
- Full name: Daniel Filipe Martins Carriço
- Date of birth: 4 August 1988 (age 38)
- Place of birth: Cascais, Portugal
- Height: 1.80 m (5 ft 11 in)
- Positions: Centre-back; defensive midfielder

Youth career
- 1997–1999: Estoril
- 1999–2007: Sporting CP

Senior career*
Years	Team	Apps	(Gls)
2007–2012	Sporting CP	91	(2)
2007	→ Olhanense (loan)	8	(0)
2008	→ AEL Limassol (loan)	14	(0)
2013–2014	Reading	3	(0)
2013–2014	→ Sevilla (loan)	22	(2)
2014–2020	Sevilla	89	(3)
2020–2021	Wuhan Zall	20	(2)
2021–2022	Almería	6	(0)
Total		253	(9)

International career
2003–2004	Portugal U16	8	(0)
2004–2005	Portugal U17	13	(2)
2005–2006	Portugal U18	8	(0)
2006–2007	Portugal U19	15	(2)
2007–2008	Portugal U20	10	(0)
2007–2010	Portugal U21	16	(0)
2015	Portugal	1	(0)
- * Club domestic league appearances and goals

Daniel Filipe Martins Carriço (born 4 August 1988) is a Portuguese former professional footballer who played mainly as a central defender.

He spent most of his early career with Sporting CP, appearing in 154 official matches over four and a half seasons and scoring five goals. In 2013 he signed with Sevilla, winning the Europa League four times with the club while playing 167 games in all competitions.

Carriço earned 70 caps for Portugal across all youth levels, including 16 for the under-21s (four goals). He played one match with the senior team in 2015.

== Club career ==
=== Sporting CP ===
A product of Sporting CP's prolific youth academy, Carriço was born in Cascais and made his professional debut in 2007–08, splitting that season with S.C. Olhanense and Cyprus' AEL Limassol, in both cases on loan. After returning, he made his Primeira Liga debut on 26 October 2008, replacing the injured Tonel in a 0–0 away draw against F.C. Paços de Ferreira and securing a starting place even after the latter became available.

For 2010–11, after longtime incumbent João Moutinho's departure to FC Porto, Carriço was chosen as new team captain by newly appointed coach Paulo Sérgio. In the following campaign, under both Domingos Paciência and his successor Ricardo Sá Pinto, he was used almost exclusively as a defensive midfielder.

=== Reading ===
On 31 December 2012, Sporting announced that Carriço had been sold to Premier League club Reading for a fee of £609,000 (€750,000); he signed an initial two-and-a-half-year contract, with the option of a further year. He made his debut on 12 January 2013, starting and playing 45 minutes in a 3–2 home win against West Bromwich Albion.

Carriço only totalled 87 minutes – all in the league – and four bench appearances, as the English side eventually suffered relegation after ranking 19th.

=== Sevilla ===
On 17 July 2013, Carriço joined Sevilla FC on a season-long loan with a view to a permanent move. He made his debut on 1 August in a UEFA Europa League qualifier in which he scored the last goal of a 3–0 home win over FK Mladost Podgorica. His La Liga bow occurred on 20 October in a 2–2 draw at Real Valladolid, and his first goal for the club came on 11 January 2014, a late equaliser which ensured a 1–1 away draw against Elche CF. His only other goal of the campaign was on 9 March, the second in a 3–1 victory at UD Almería.

Carriço played the entirety of the 2014 UEFA Europa League final in Turin, partnering Stéphane Mbia in defensive midfield as Sevilla beat S.L. Benfica on penalties. He signed a permanent deal with Sevilla on 23 June 2014, and his first match after that was the UEFA Super Cup at Cardiff City Stadium, a 2–0 defeat to compatriots Real Madrid.

On 23 April 2015, Carriço became the player with most appearances in the Europa League at 45. Again an undisputed starter for manager Unai Emery, he also appeared in the 2015 final of the competition, won against FC Dnipro Dnipropetrovsk (3–2).

Carriço missed the first part of the 2015–16 season due to a tendon injury, but was still able to contribute 25 appearances in all competitions, scoring in a 1–1 away draw against RC Celta de Vigo. He also started in both of the team's finals: he helped them to a third consecutive Europa League title by defeating Liverpool 3–1 in the final in Basel, making a goal-line clearance from Daniel Sturridge's header after ten minutes and subsequently dedicating the victory to Antonio Puerta, a Sevilla player who died in 2007. On 22 May 2016, in the last minute of extra time of the final of the Copa del Rey against FC Barcelona, he was sent off for two bookable offences in less than 30 seconds, first for tackling Lionel Messi then for calling referee Carlos del Cerro Grande a "faggot" in an eventual 2–0 loss, receiving a four-match ban the following day for his actions.

=== Wuhan Zall ===
On 20 February 2020, Carriço transferred to Wuhan Zall FC. He joined the Chinese Super League club despite it being based in the city that was the point of origin of the COVID-19 pandemic. Due to the health crisis, he did not debut until 25 July, when he came on as an added-time substitute in a 2–0 opening day win at home to Qingdao Huanghai FC.

=== Almería ===
On 22 August 2021, Carriço returned to Spain after agreeing to a one-year contract with Almería in the Segunda División. In April 2023, with just 218 minutes to his credit as they won the league and subsequently promoted, he announced his retirement at 35.

== International career ==
As a youth international, Carriço appeared at the 2007 UEFA European Under-19 Championship, where he was elected as one of the best players after scoring two goals in just three games (Portugal did not go through the group stage). The following year, he progressed to the under-21s.

In May 2015, shortly after winning his second consecutive Europa League title, Carriço was called up to the senior national team for the first time by coach Fernando Santos, ahead of a UEFA Euro 2016 qualifier against Armenia and a friendly with Italy. He made his only senior appearance in the latter on 16 June, coming on as a 60th-minute substitute for Bruno Alves in the 1–0 win in Geneva.

== Career statistics ==
=== Club ===
As of match played 15 August 2021

Appearances and goals by club, season and competition
Club	Season	League			National Cup		League Cup		Europe		Other		Total	
Club	Season	Division	Apps	Goals	Apps	Goals	Apps	Goals	Apps	Goals	Apps	Goals	Apps	Goals
Sporting CP	2006–07	Primeira Liga	0	0	0	0	—		0	0	—		0	0
Sporting CP	2008–09	Primeira Liga	22	0	0	0	4	0	2 (Note: Appearances in UEFA Champions League)	0	—		28	0
Sporting CP	2009–10	Primeira Liga	25	1	3	1	4	0	12 (Note: Appearances in UEFA Champions League and UEFA Europa League)	0	—		44	2
Sporting CP	2010–11	Primeira Liga	24	0	3	0	3	0	8 (Note: Appearances in UEFA Europa League)	1	—		38	1
Sporting CP	2011–12	Primeira Liga	19	1	5	0	0	0	13	1	—		37	2
Sporting CP	2012–13	Primeira Liga	1	0	0	0	0	0	2	0	—		3	0
Sporting CP	Total		91	2	11	1	11	0	37	2	—		150	5
Olhanense (loan)	2007–08	Liga de Honra	8	0	0	0	1	0	—		—		9	0
AEL Limassol (loan)	2007–08	Cypriot First Division	14	0	0	0	0	0	—		—		14	0
Reading	2012–13	Premier League	3	0	0	0	0	0	—		—		3	0
Sevilla (loan)	2013–14	La Liga	22	2	0	0	—		9	1	—		31	3
Sevilla	2014–15	La Liga	28	1	2	0	—		14	1	1 (Note: Appearance in UEFA Super Cup)	0	45	2
Sevilla	2015–16	La Liga	14	1	5	0	—		6	0	0	0	25	1
Sevilla	2016–17	La Liga	6	0	1	0	—		2	0	1	0	10	0
Sevilla	2017–18	La Liga	6	0	0	0	—		0	0	0	0	6	0
Sevilla	2018–19	La Liga	24	1	3	0	—		11	0	0	0	38	1
Sevilla	2019–20	La Liga	11	0	0	0	—		1	0	0	0	12	0
Sevilla	Total		111	5	11	0	—		43	2	2	0	167	7
Wuhan Zall	2020	Chinese Super League	11	1	0	0	—		—		2 (Note: Appearances in CSL relegation play-offs)	0	13	1
Wuhan Zall	2021	Chinese Super League	9	1	0	0	—		—		—		9	1
Wuhan Zall	Total		20	2	0	0	—		—		2	0	22	1
Career total			247	9	22	1	12	0	80	4	4	0	365	14

=== International ===
Appearances and goals by national team and year
National team	Year	Apps	Goals
Portugal	2015	1	0
Total		1	0

== Honours ==
Sporting CP

- Supertaça Cândido de Oliveira: 2008
- Taça da Liga runner-up: 2008–09

Sevilla

- UEFA Europa League: 2013–14, 2014–15, 2015–16, 2019–20
- Copa del Rey runner-up: 2015–16
- UEFA Super Cup runner-up: 2014, 2016

Almería

- Segunda División: 2021–22
