= Vitolo (footballer, born 1989) =

Spanish footballer

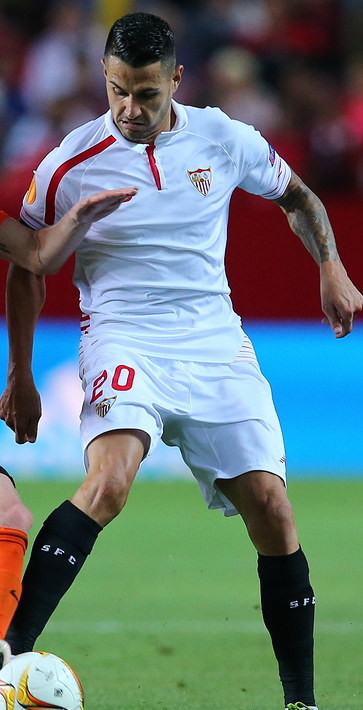
- Vitolo with Sevilla in 2016

Personal information
- Full name: Víctor Machín Pérez
- Date of birth: 2 November 1989 (age 37)
- Place of birth: Las Palmas, Spain
- Height: 1.85 m (6 ft 1 in)
- Positions: Winger; forward

Youth career
- Las Palmas

Senior career*
Years	Team	Apps	(Gls)
2008–2010	Las Palmas B	61	(11)
2010–2013	Las Palmas	85	(26)
2013–2017	Sevilla	115	(18)
2017–2024	Atlético Madrid	72	(4)
2017	→ Las Palmas (loan)	9	(1)
2021–2022	→ Getafe (loan)	7	(0)
2022–2023	→ Las Palmas (loan)	8	(0)
Total		357	(60)

International career
2015–2017	Spain	12	(4)
- * Club domestic league appearances and goals

Víctor Machín Pérez (Spanish pronunciation: [ˈbiɣtoɾ maˈtʃim ˈpeɾeθ]; (Note: In isolation, Machín is pronounced [maˈtʃin].) born 2 November 1989), known as Vitolo ([biˈtolo]), is a Spanish former professional footballer who played mainly as a left winger and occasionally as a forward.

He began his career with Las Palmas before joining Sevilla in 2013, where he won the Europa League three times. He signed with Atlético Madrid in 2017, winning the same competition in his first season and adding the subsequent Super Cup.

Vitolo won his first cap for Spain in 2015.

== Club career ==
=== Las Palmas ===
Vitolo was born in Las Palmas. He came through the youth ranks at hometown club UD Las Palmas, playing for two years with the B team before making the breakthrough in the 2010–11 season, with the Canary Islands side in the Segunda División. He made his debut on 28 August 2010, playing the full 90 minutes in a 3–2 home win against Gimnàstic de Tarragona, and scored his first goal for the club in a 4–1 defeat of AD Alcorcón on 11 September, also at home.

On 27 November 2010, in another home fixture, against Rayo Vallecano, Vitolo sustained an anterior cruciate ligament injury on his right knee that ruled him out for the rest of the campaign. He scored a squad-best ten times in 2011–12, repeating the feat the following season with 15.

=== Sevilla ===
Vitolo joined Sevilla FC on 28 June 2013, after agreeing to a four-year contract. He made his debut in La Liga on 18 August by featuring the full 90 minutes in a 1–3 home loss to Atlético Madrid, and scored his first goal in the competition on 10 November, contributing to a 3–1 away victory over RCD Espanyol.

In his first season in Andalusia, Vitolo played 45 games in all competitions and scored eight times; this included four in 16 matches in the club's victorious run in the UEFA Europa League. On 12 March 2015 he scored the fastest-ever goal in the continental competition, finding the net after just 13 seconds to help to a 3–1 away win against fellow Spaniards Villarreal CF; he was surpassed on 15 September 2016 by Jan Sýkora from FC Slovan Liberec, who netted against Qarabağ FK at 10,69.

With three league goals in March 2015 – half of his total for the season up to then – Vitolo was voted La Liga Player of the Month. On 27 May, he assisted Carlos Bacca's winning goal as Sevilla retained their Europa League crown with a 3–2 defeat of FC Dnipro in Warsaw.

=== Atlético Madrid ===
On 12 July 2017, Vitolo signed for Atlético Madrid on a five-year deal. However, due to the club's transfer ban which did not allow it to register any new players, he was sent on loan to Las Palmas until December.

Vitolo made his competitive debut for Atlético on 3 January 2018, coming on as a 59th-minute substitute for Yannick Carrasco in the 4–0 away win over Lleida Esportiu in the Copa del Rey. He scored his first goal in the second leg, a 3–0 victory.

Deemed surplus to requirements by manager Diego Simeone, Vitolo made only ten appearances in the 2020–21 campaign as the team won their first national championship in seven years. On 4 July 2021, he was loaned to Getafe CF.

In July 2022, still owned by Atlético, Vitolo returned to both the second tier and Las Palmas. He announced his retirement on 21 December 2024 aged 35, after two years on the sidelines and three knee surgeries.

== International career ==
On 20 March 2015, coach Vicente del Bosque called up former Spain under-19 international Vitolo for the first time to the senior squad for a UEFA Euro 2016 qualifier against Ukraine. He did not take part in the match, a 1–0 win at his club ground, the Ramón Sánchez Pizjuán Stadium, but made his debut in the following fixture, a 2–0 friendly loss at the Amsterdam Arena to the Netherlands on the 31st, replacing Pedro at half time.

== Career statistics ==
=== Club ===
Appearances and goals by club, season and competition
Club	Season	League			Cup		Europe		Other		Total	
Club	Season	Division	Apps	Goals	Apps	Goals	Apps	Goals	Apps	Goals	Apps	Goals
Las Palmas B	2008–09	Segunda División B	21	4	—		—		2	0	23	4
Las Palmas	2010–11	Segunda División	10	1	0	0	—		—		10	1
Las Palmas	2011–12	Segunda División	36	10	0	0	—		—		36	10
Las Palmas	2012–13	Segunda División	39	15	3	0	—		2 (Note: Appearances in La Liga play-offs)	0	44	15
Las Palmas	Total		85	26	3	0	—		2	0	90	26
Sevilla	2013–14	La Liga	29	4	0	0	16 (Note: Appearances in UEFA Europa League)	4	—		45	8
Sevilla	2014–15	La Liga	28	6	2	0	11	3	1 (Note: Appearance in UEFA Super Cup)	0	42	9
Sevilla	2015–16	La Liga	28	2	6	1	12 (Note: Five appearances and one goal in UEFA Champions League, seven appearances and one goal in UEFA Europa League)	2	1	0	47	5
Sevilla	2016–17	La Liga	30	6	2	0	8 (Note: Appearances in UEFA Champions League)	0	3 (Note: One appearance in UEFA Super Cup, two appearances in Supercopa de España)	0	43	6
Sevilla	Total		115	18	10	1	47	9	5	0	177	28
Atlético Madrid	2017–18	La Liga	14	1	3	1	6	1	—		23	3
Atlético Madrid	2018–19	La Liga	20	0	3	1	4	0	1	0	28	1
Atlético Madrid	2019–20	La Liga	28	3	1	0	4	0	2 (Note: Appearances in Supercopa de España)	0	35	3
Atlético Madrid	2020–21	La Liga	10	0	2	0	3	0	—		15	0
Atlético Madrid	Total		72	4	9	2	17	1	3	0	101	7
Las Palmas (loan)	2017–18	La Liga	9	1	2	0	—		—		11	1
Getafe (loan)	2021–22	La Liga	7	0	0	0	—		—		7	0
Las Palmas (loan)	2022–23	Segunda División	8	0	0	0	—		—		8	0
Career total			317	53	24	3	64	10	12	0	417	66

=== International ===
National Team	Year	Apps	Goals
Spain
Spain	2015	3	0
Spain	2016	6	3
Spain	2017	3	1
Total		12	4

Spain score listed first, score column indicates score after each Vitolo goal.

International goals by date, venue, cap, opponent, score, result and competition
No.	Date	Venue	Cap	Opponent	Score	Result	Competition
1	5 September 2016	Reino de León, León, Spain	5	Liechtenstein	4–0	8–0	2018 FIFA World Cup qualification
2	6 October 2016	Juventus Stadium, Turin, Italy	6	Italy	1–0	1–1	2018 FIFA World Cup qualification
3	12 November 2016	Nuevo Los Cármenes, Granada, Spain	8	Macedonia	2–0	4–0	2018 FIFA World Cup qualification
4	24 March 2017	El Molinón, Gijón, Spain	9	Israel	2–0	4–1	2018 FIFA World Cup qualification

== Honours ==
Sevilla

- UEFA Europa League: 2013–14, 2014–15, 2015–16
- Copa del Rey runner-up: 2015–16
- Supercopa de España runner-up: 2016
- UEFA Super Cup runner-up: 2014, 2015, 2016

Atlético Madrid

- La Liga: 2020–21
- UEFA Europa League: 2017–18
- UEFA Super Cup: 2018

Individual

- La Liga Player of the Month: March 2015
