= 2016 UEFA Super Cup =

Real Madrid	Sevilla
(Spain)	(Spain)
3	2
- After extra time
- Date: 9 August 2016
- Venue: Lerkendal Stadion, Trondheim
- Man of the Match: Sergio Ramos (Real Madrid)
- Referee: Milorad Mažić (Serbia)
- Attendance: 17,939
- Weather: Rain; 10 °C (50 °F); 92% humidity

The 2016 UEFA Super Cup was the 41st edition of the UEFA Super Cup, an annual football match organised by UEFA and contested by the reigning champions of the two main European club competitions, the UEFA Champions League and the UEFA Europa League. The match featured Real Madrid, the winners of the 2015–16 UEFA Champions League, and Sevilla, the winners of the 2015–16 UEFA Europa League. It was a rematch of the 2014 UEFA Super Cup, which was won 2–0 by Real Madrid.

It was played at the Lerkendal Stadion in Trondheim, Norway, on 9 August 2016. Real Madrid won the match 3–2 after extra time for their third UEFA Super Cup title.

== Venue ==
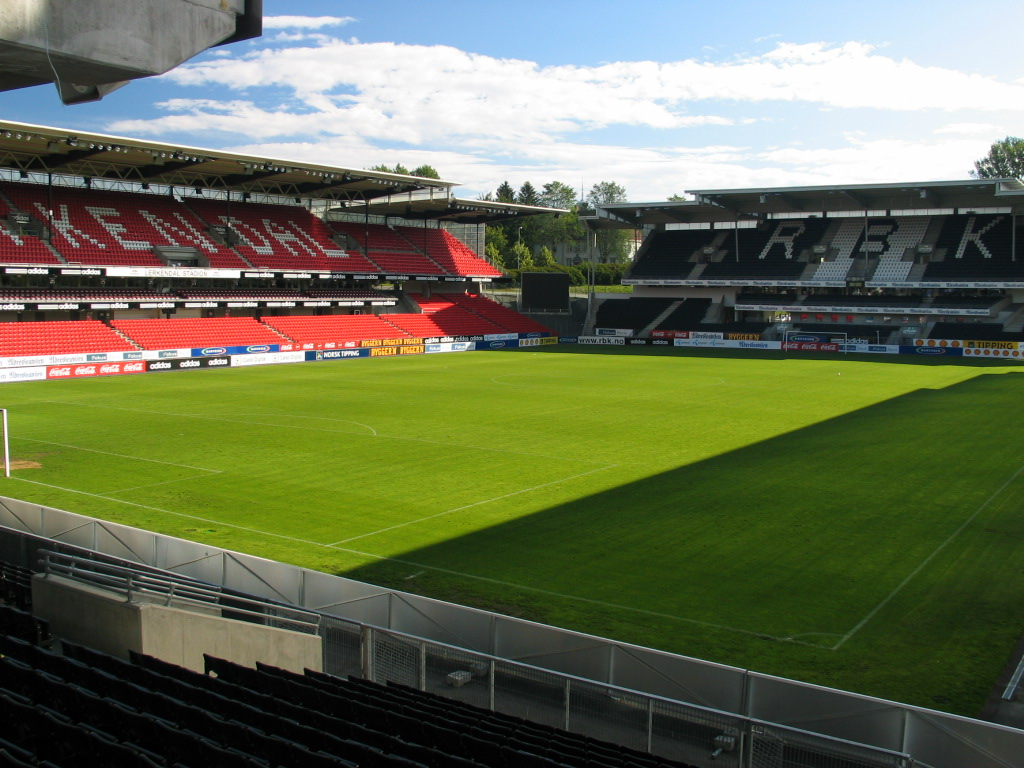
The Lerkendal Stadion in Trondheim hosted the match.

The Lerkendal Stadion was announced as the venue of the Super Cup at the UEFA Executive Committee meeting in Nyon, Switzerland, on 18 September 2014. It was the first UEFA final hosted in Norway.

The Lerkendal Stadion opened as a multi-purpose stadium on 10 August 1947, as the main football and athletics stadium in Trondheim. It is the home stadium of Rosenborg. The stadium has a capacity for 21,166 spectators, making it the second largest football stadium in Norway.

== Teams ==
Team	Qualification	Previous participation (bold indicates winners)
(Spain) Real Madrid	Winners of the 2015–16 UEFA Champions League	1998, 2000, **2002**, **2014**
(Spain) Sevilla	Winners of the 2015–16 UEFA Europa League	**2006**, 2007, 2014, 2015

This was the third consecutive and fourth overall all-Spanish Super Cup.

== Match ==
=== Summary ===
Real Madrid's starters of the 2016 Champions League Final Toni Kroos, Gareth Bale and Cristiano Ronaldo missed the match with injuries. In the 21st minute Marco Asensio scored the opening goal for Real Madrid with a strike from 25-yards out which flew into the top left corner of the net. Franco Vázquez got the equalizer in the 41st minute when he scored with a low left foot shot from just inside the penalty area. Sevilla were awarded a penalty in the 72nd minute when Sergio Ramos was adjudged to have fouled Vitolo by flicking back his leg inside the penalty area. Yevhen Konoplyanka scored from the resulting penalty with a low shot to his left sending the goalkeeper the wrong way. In the 93rd minute Sergio Ramos scored with a free header from two yards out after a cross from Lucas Vázquez on the right. Four minutes into extra-time Timothée Kolodziejczak was sent off for a second yellow card following a foul on Lucas Vázquez. Sergio Ramos then stooped low to score his second goal but the goal was ruled out for a pull on Sevilla defender Adil Rami. In the 119th minute Dani Carvajal got into the penalty box after a long run down the right and scored when he lifted the ball with the outside of his right foot over the goalkeeper.

=== Details ===
The Champions League winners were designated as the "home" team for administrative purposes.

9 August 2016
20:45 UTC+2

Real Madrid (Spain)	3–2 (a.e.t.)	(Spain) Sevilla
Asensio 21'; Ramos 90+3'; Carvajal 119'	Report	Vázquez 41'; Konoplyanka 72' (pen.)

Lerkendal Stadion, Trondheim
Attendance: 17,939
Referee: Milorad Mažić (Serbia)

**Real Madrid**	**Sevilla**

GK	13	(Spain) Kiko Casilla
RB	2	(Spain) Dani Carvajal	(yellow card) 84'
CB	5	(France) Raphaël Varane
CB	4	(Spain) Sergio Ramos (c)
LB	12	(Brazil) Marcelo
CM	16	(Croatia) Mateo Kovačić		(substituted off) 73'
CM	14	(Brazil) Casemiro
CM	22	(Spain) Isco		(substituted off) 66'
RF	17	(Spain) Lucas Vázquez
CF	21	(Spain) Álvaro Morata		(substituted off) 62'
LF	28	(Spain) Marco Asensio	(yellow card) 86'
Substitutes:
GK	31	(Spain) Rubén Yáñez
DF	6	(Spain) Nacho
DF	23	(Brazil) Danilo
MF	10	(Colombia) James Rodríguez	(yellow card) 93'	(substituted on) 73'
MF	19	(Croatia) Luka Modrić		(substituted on) 66'
MF	27	(Spain) Marcos Llorente
FW	9	(France) Karim Benzema		(substituted on) 62'
Manager:
(France) Zinedine Zidane

GK	1	(Spain) Sergio Rico
CB	21	(Argentina) Nicolás Pareja
CB	6	(Portugal) Daniel Carriço		(substituted off) 51'
CB	5	(France) Timothée Kolodziejczak	(yellow card) 90' (yellow-red card) 93'
DM	8	(Spain) Vicente Iborra (c)		(substituted off) 74'
RM	14	(Japan) Hiroshi Kiyotake
LM	22	(Italy) Franco Vázquez
AM	15	(France) Steven Nzonzi
RF	25	(Brazil) Mariano
CF	9	(Argentina) Luciano Vietto		(substituted off) 67'
LF	20	(Spain) Vitolo	(yellow card) 39'
Substitutes:
GK	13	(Spain) David Soria
DF	18	(Spain) Sergio Escudero
DF	23	(France) Adil Rami		(substituted on) 51'
MF	4	(Argentina) Matías Kranevitter		(substituted on) 74'
MF	10	(Ukraine) Yevhen Konoplyanka		(substituted on) 67'
MF	17	(Spain) Pablo Sarabia
FW	12	(France) Wissam Ben Yedder
Manager:
(Argentina) Jorge Sampaoli

Man of the Match:
Sergio Ramos (Real Madrid)

Assistant referees:
Milovan Ristić (Serbia)
Dalibor Đurđević (Serbia)
Fourth official:
Szymon Marciniak (Poland)
Additional assistant referees:
Danilo Grujić (Serbia)
Nenad Đokić (Serbia)
Reserve assistant referee:
Tomasz Listkiewicz (Poland)

**Match rules**

- 90 minutes.
- 30 minutes of extra time if necessary.
- Penalty shoot-out if scores still level.
- Seven named substitutes, of which up to three may be used.

=== Statistics ===
First half
Statistic	Real Madrid	Sevilla
Goals scored	1	1
Total shots	4	3
Shots on target	3	2
Saves	1	2
Ball possession	36%	64%
Corner kicks	2	1
Fouls committed	5	10
Offsides	3	0
Yellow cards	0	1
Red cards	0	0

Second half
Statistic	Real Madrid	Sevilla
Goals scored	1	1
Total shots	8	2
Shots on target	3	1
Saves	0	2
Ball possession	42%	58%
Corner kicks	6	1
Fouls committed	9	5
Offsides	2	1
Yellow cards	2	1
Red cards	0	0

Extra time
Statistic	Real Madrid	Sevilla
Goals scored	1	0
Total shots	10	2
Shots on target	7	0
Saves	0	6
Ball possession	50%	50%
Corner kicks	2	1
Fouls committed	5	6
Offsides	0	0
Yellow cards	1	1
Red cards	0	1

Overall
Statistic	Real Madrid	Sevilla
Goals scored	3	2
Total shots	22	7
Shots on target	13	3
Saves	1	10
Ball possession	42%	58%
Corner kicks	10	3
Fouls committed	19	21
Offsides	5	1
Yellow cards	3	3
Red cards	0	1

== See also ==
- 2014 UEFA Super Cup – contested between same teams
- 2016 UEFA Champions League final
- 2016 UEFA Europa League final
- 2016–17 UEFA Champions League
- 2016–17 UEFA Europa League
- 2016–17 Real Madrid CF season
- 2016–17 Sevilla FC season
- Real Madrid CF in international football
- Sevilla FC in European football
- Spanish football clubs in international competitions
