= 2015 UEFA Super Cup =

Barcelona	Sevilla
(Spain)	(Spain)
5	4
- After extra time
- Date: 11 August 2015
- Venue: Boris Paichadze Dinamo Arena, Tbilisi
- Man of the Match: Lionel Messi (Barcelona)
- Referee: Willie Collum (Scotland)
- Attendance: 51,940
- Weather: Clear night 27 °C (81 °F); 49% humidity

The 2015 UEFA Super Cup was a football match between Spanish teams Barcelona and Sevilla on 11 August 2015 at the Boris Paichadze Dinamo Arena in Tbilisi, Georgia. It was the 40th UEFA Super Cup, an annual tournament contested by the winners of the UEFA Champions League and UEFA Europa League. Barcelona were appearing in the Super Cup for the ninth time, they had previously won and lost the competition four times each. Sevilla were appearing in the competition for the fourth time, they had won once and lost twice. The two sides had met before in the competition in 2006, when Sevilla won 3–0.

The teams had qualified for the competition by winning the two seasonal European competitions. Barcelona won the 2014–15 UEFA Champions League, defeating Italian Juventus 3–1 in the final. Sevilla qualified as winners of the 2014–15 UEFA Europa League. They beat Ukrainian team Dnipro 3–2 in the final.

Barcelona won the game 5–4 after extra time to claim their fifth Super Cup title, tying Milan's record. Their ninth Super Cup appearance was also a record, two ahead of Milan. Dani Alves's fourth Super Cup win and fifth appearance matched Paolo Maldini's records, while Luis Enrique became the fourth man to lift the UEFA Super Cup as coach and player after Pep Guardiola, Carlo Ancelotti and Diego Simeone. The nine goals scored were also the most in any Super Cup fixture, and the attendance of 51,940 was a record for a one-off, neutral venue UEFA Super Cup.

== Venue ==
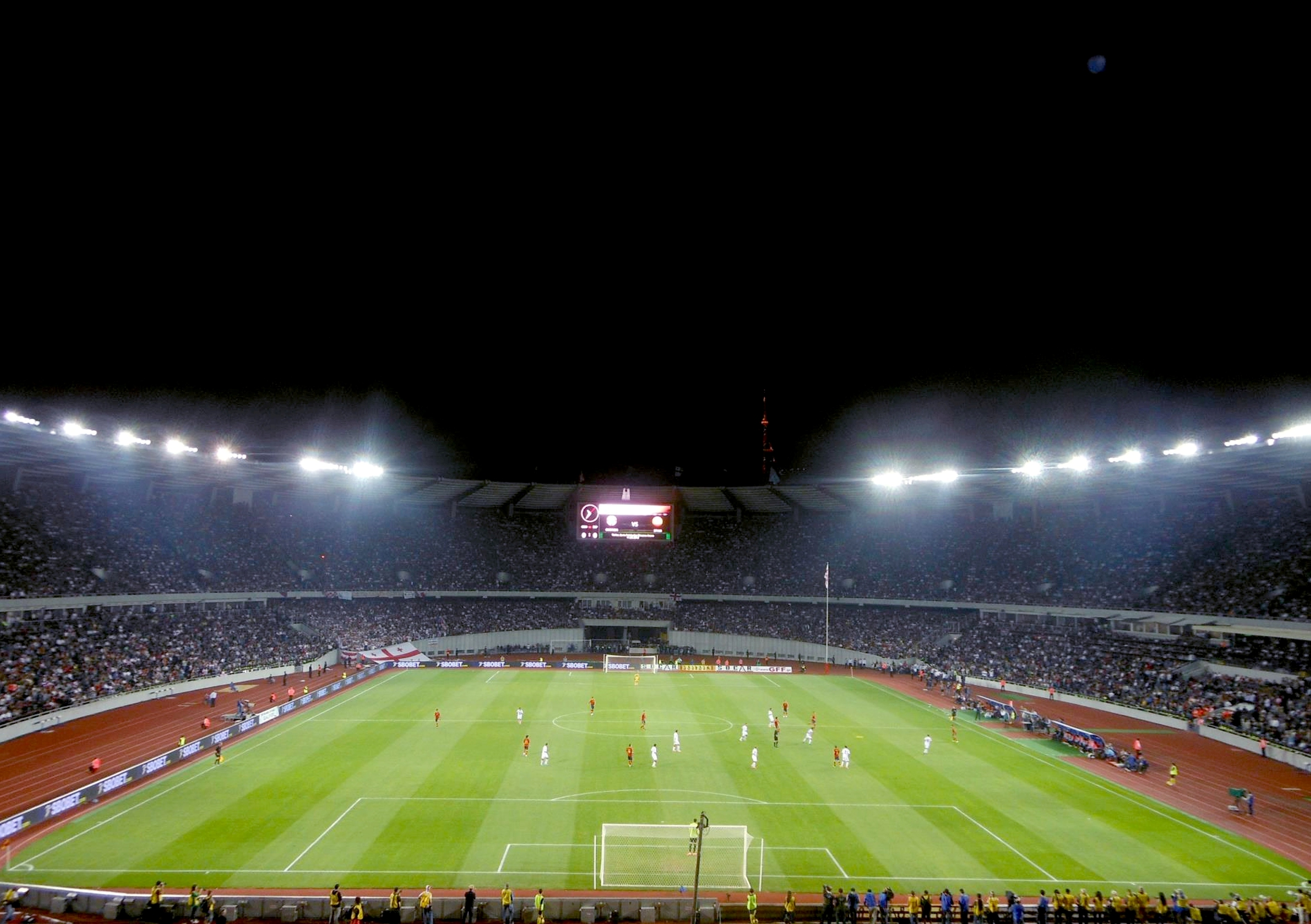
Boris Paichadze Dinamo Arena in Tbilisi, Georgia, hosted the match.

The Mikheil Meskhi Stadium was originally announced as the venue of the Super Cup at the UEFA Executive Committee meeting on 5 March 2014, but the venue was changed to the Boris Paichadze Dinamo Arena. This was the first UEFA Super Cup hosted in Georgia. The Boris Paichadze Dinamo Arena was built in 1976 and renovated in 2011. It is the home stadium of the Georgia national football team and FC Dinamo Tbilisi.

== Teams ==
Team	Qualification	Previous participation (bold indicates winners)
(Spain) Barcelona	Winners of the 2014–15 UEFA Champions League	1979, 1982, 1989, **1992**, **1997**, 2006, **2009**, **2011**
(Spain) Sevilla	Winners of the 2014–15 UEFA Europa League	**2006**, 2007, 2014

== Match ==
=== Summary ===
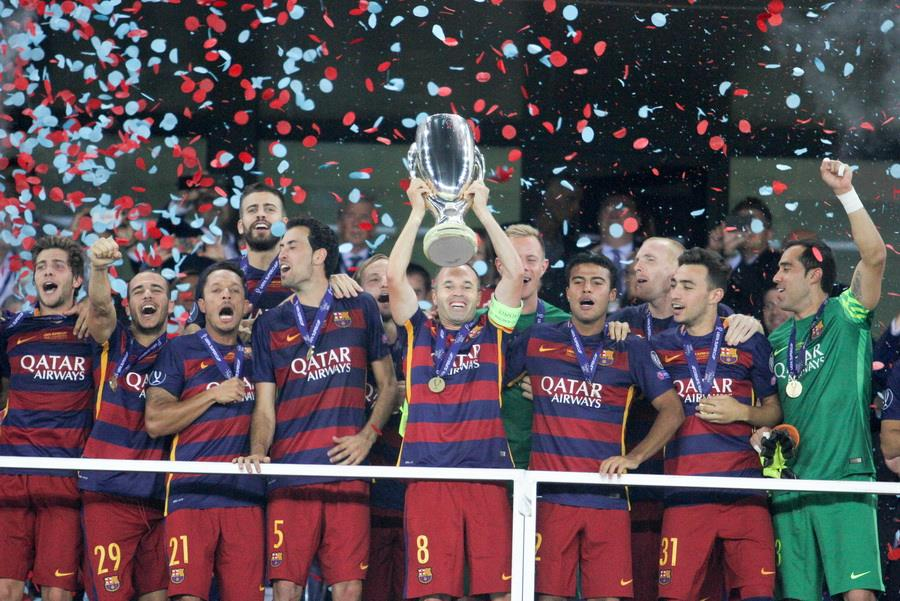
Barcelona lift UEFA Super Cup after defeating Sevilla in the final.

Sevilla took the lead in the third minute through a curling free kick from Éver Banega, awarded for a foul on José Antonio Reyes by Javier Mascherano. Barcelona equalised in a similar manner four minutes later, when Lionel Messi scored from a free kick following Grzegorz Krychowiak's foul on Luis Suárez, and then took the lead through another Messi free kick in the 16th minute, after Banega fouled former Sevilla midfielder Ivan Rakitić. Suárez had a goal ruled out for offside shortly after, but Rafinha made the score 3–1 to Barcelona at half time, sliding in from close range after Suárez's effort was saved by Beto.

Suárez scored early in the second half, assisted by a pass from Sergio Busquets after the midfielder intercepted a pass in the Sevilla half, but Reyes pulled a goal back for Sevilla five minutes later, following a cross from Vitolo. In the 72nd minute, Vitolo was brought down in the Barcelona penalty area by Jérémy Mathieu, and Kevin Gameiro powered home the resulting penalty kick to make the score 4–3. With 10 minutes to play, two Sevilla substitutes combined for the equalising goal, as Ciro Immobile squared the ball across the goal area for Yevhen Konoplyanka to score. Messi almost had a hat-trick of free kicks in the 89th minute, but his attempt hit the crossbar.

Barcelona introduced Pedro in place of Mascherano at the start of the additional half-hour. With five minutes to play in the second half of extra time, he pounced on the rebound from yet another Messi free kick to put Barcelona ahead, just as he had against Shakhtar Donetsk in 2009. Adil Rami had an attempt on goal from the edge of the goal area in injury time at the end of the extra period, but he missed and Barcelona won the Super Cup for a record fifth time. With nine goals shared between the two teams, this was the highest-scoring Super Cup.

=== Details ===
11 August 2015
22:45 GET (UTC+4)

Barcelona (Spain)	5–4 (a.e.t.)	(Spain) Sevilla
Messi 7', 16'; Rafinha 44'; Suárez 52'; Pedro 115'	Report	Banega 3'; Reyes 57'; Gameiro 72' (pen.); Konoplyanka 81'

Boris Paichadze Dinamo Arena, Tbilisi
Attendance: 51,940
Referee: Willie Collum (Scotland)

**Barcelona**	**Sevilla**

GK	1	(Germany) Marc-André ter Stegen
RB	6	(Brazil) Dani Alves	(yellow card) 120'
CB	3	(Spain) Gerard Piqué
CB	14	(Argentina) Javier Mascherano		(substituted off) 93'
LB	24	(France) Jérémy Mathieu	(yellow card) 71'
DM	5	(Spain) Sergio Busquets	(yellow card) 117'
CM	4	(Croatia) Ivan Rakitić
CM	8	(Spain) Andrés Iniesta (c)		(substituted off) 63'
RF	10	(Argentina) Lionel Messi
CF	9	(Uruguay) Luis Suárez
LF	12	(Brazil) Rafinha		(substituted off) 78'
Substitutes:
GK	13	(Chile) Claudio Bravo
DF	15	(Spain) Marc Bartra		(substituted on) 78'
DF	21	(Brazil) Adriano
MF	20	(Spain) Sergi Roberto		(substituted on) 63'
FW	7	(Spain) Pedro	(yellow card) 94'	(substituted on) 93'
FW	29	(Spain) Sandro
FW	31	(Spain) Munir
Manager:
(Spain) Luis Enrique

GK	13	(Portugal) Beto
RB	23	(Spain) Coke	(yellow card) 87'
CB	3	(France) Adil Rami
CB	4	(Poland) Grzegorz Krychowiak	(yellow card) 14'
LB	2	(France) Benoît Trémoulinas
CM	7	(Denmark) Michael Krohn-Dehli	(yellow card) 120'
CM	19	(Argentina) Éver Banega	(yellow card) 90+2'
RW	10	(Spain) José Antonio Reyes (c)		(substituted off) 68'
AM	8	(Spain) Vicente Iborra		(substituted off) 80'
LW	20	(Spain) Vitolo
CF	9	(France) Kevin Gameiro		(substituted off) 80'
Substitutes:
GK	1	(Spain) Sergio Rico
DF	25	(Brazil) Mariano		(substituted on) 80'
MF	12	(France) Gaël Kakuta
MF	16	(Spain) Luismi
MF	17	(Spain) Denis Suárez
MF	22	(Ukraine) Yevhen Konoplyanka		(substituted on) 68'
FW	11	(Italy) Ciro Immobile	(yellow card) 92'	(substituted on) 80'
Manager:
(Spain) Unai Emery

Man of the Match:
Lionel Messi (Barcelona)

Assistant referees:
Damien MacGraith (Republic of Ireland)
Francis Connor (Scotland)
Fourth official:
Graham Chambers (Scotland)
Additional assistant referees:
Bobby Madden (Scotland)
Kevin Clancy (Scotland)

**Match rules**

- 90 minutes
- 30 minutes of extra time if necessary
- Penalty shoot-out if scores still level
- Seven named substitutes, of which up to three may be used

=== Statistics ===
First half
Statistic	Barcelona	Sevilla
Goals scored	3	1
Total shots	8	6
Shots on target	5	2
Saves	1	2
Ball possession	63%	37%
Corner kicks	4	2
Fouls committed	4	7
Offsides	1	2
Yellow cards	0	1
Red cards	0	0

Second half
Statistic	Barcelona	Sevilla
Goals scored	1	3
Total shots	10	8
Shots on target	3	3
Saves	0	2
Ball possession	57%	43%
Corner kicks	1	2
Fouls committed	11	7
Offsides	1	1
Yellow cards	1	2
Red cards	0	0

Extra time
Statistic	Barcelona	Sevilla
Goals scored	1	0
Total shots	6	3
Shots on target	2	1
Saves	1	1
Ball possession	68%	32%
Corner kicks	3	0
Fouls committed	5	7
Offsides	1	1
Yellow cards	3	2
Red cards	0	0

Overall
Statistic	Barcelona	Sevilla
Goals scored	5	4
Total shots	24	17
Shots on target	10	6
Saves	2	5
Ball possession	62%	38%
Corner kicks	8	4
Fouls committed	20	21
Offsides	3	4
Yellow cards	4	5
Red cards	0	0

== Broadcasters ==
The match was shown on beIN Sports in Spain.

== See also ==
- 2015–16 UEFA Champions League
- 2015–16 UEFA Europa League
- 2015–16 FC Barcelona season
- 2015–16 Sevilla FC season
- 2006 UEFA Super Cup – contested between same teams
- Sevilla FC in European football
- FC Barcelona in international football
- Spanish football clubs in international competitions
