= 2014 UEFA Super Cup =

Real Madrid	Sevilla
(Spain)	(Spain)
2	0
- Date: 12 August 2014
- Venue: Cardiff City Stadium, Cardiff
- Man of the Match: Cristiano Ronaldo (Real Madrid)
- Referee: Mark Clattenburg (England)
- Attendance: 30,854
- Weather: Cloudy night 20 °C (68 °F); 75% humidity

The 2014 UEFA Super Cup was the 39th edition of the UEFA Super Cup, an annual football match organised by UEFA and contested by the reigning champions of the two main European club competitions, the UEFA Champions League and the UEFA Europa League. The match featured two Spanish teams Real Madrid and Sevilla, the winners of the 2013–14 UEFA Champions League and the 2013–14 UEFA Europa League respectively. It was played at the Cardiff City Stadium in Cardiff, Wales, on 12 August 2014. The date was moved from Friday in late August in previous years, to mid-August starting this year, following the removal of the August international friendly date in the new FIFA International Match Calendar.

Real Madrid won 2–0 to win their second UEFA Super Cup, with both goals by Cristiano Ronaldo.

== Venue ==
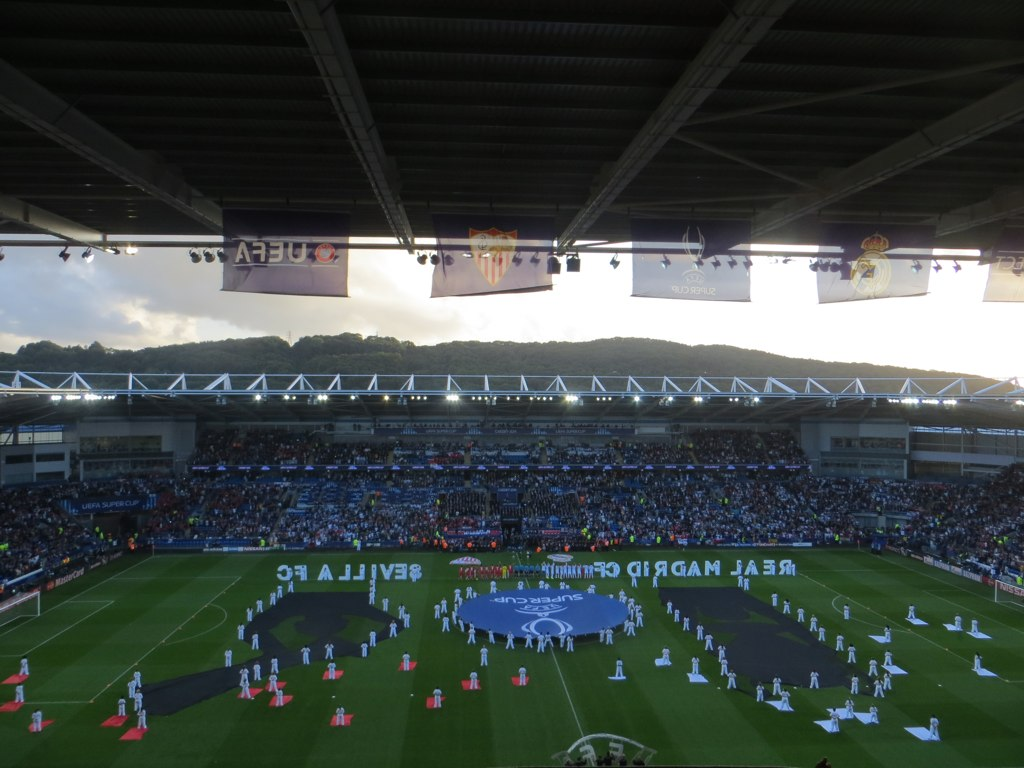
The match was played at the Cardiff City Stadium in Cardiff, Wales.

The Cardiff City Stadium was announced as the venue of the Super Cup at the UEFA Executive Committee meeting on 30 June 2012. This was the first UEFA Super Cup hosted in Wales.

The Cardiff City Stadium opened in July 2009 on the site of the Cardiff Athletics Stadium. It is the home stadium of Cardiff City. The stadium had a capacity of 33,000 after expansion work.

== Teams ==
Team	Qualification	Previous participation (bold indicates winners)
(Spain) Real Madrid	Winners of the 2013–14 UEFA Champions League	1998, 2000, **2002**
(Spain) Sevilla	Winners of the 2013–14 UEFA Europa League	**2006**, 2007

== Pre-match ==
=== Ticketing ===
The international ticket sales phase for the general public ran from 5 to 27 June 2014. Tickets were available in three price categories: £110, £75, and £40.

=== Officials ===
England's Mark Clattenburg was appointed by UEFA as the referee of the match, accompanied by an all-English team of officials: assistant referees Simon Beck and Stuart Burt, fourth official Darren England, and additional assistant referees Michael Oliver and Anthony Taylor.

The match was the first in a UEFA club competition to use vanishing spray.

== Match ==
=== Team selection ===
Real Madrid midfielder Xabi Alonso was suspended for the match, due to breaches of conduct in the Champions League Final, for which he was also suspended.

New signings Toni Kroos and James Rodríguez made their competitive debuts for Real Madrid; another new signing, Keylor Navas, was an unused substitute. Sevilla gave competitive debuts to Denis Suárez, Aleix Vidal and Grzegorz Krychowiak, as well as substitute Iago Aspas. Nicolás Pareja and Daniel Carriço represented Sevilla for the first time since their loans were made permanent.

=== Details ===
12 August 2014
19:45 BST

Real Madrid (Spain)	2–0	(Spain) Sevilla
Ronaldo 30', 49'	Report

Cardiff City Stadium, Cardiff
Attendance: 30,854
Referee: Mark Clattenburg (England)

**Real Madrid**	**Sevilla**

GK	1	(Spain) Iker Casillas (c)
RB	15	(Spain) Dani Carvajal	(yellow card) 45'
CB	4	(Spain) Sergio Ramos
CB	3	(Portugal) Pepe
LB	5	(Portugal) Fábio Coentrão		(substituted off) 84'
CM	8	(Germany) Toni Kroos	(yellow card) 53'
CM	19	(Croatia) Luka Modrić		(substituted off) 86'
AM	10	(Colombia) James Rodríguez		(substituted off) 72'
RW	11	(Wales) Gareth Bale
CF	9	(France) Karim Benzema
LW	7	(Portugal) Cristiano Ronaldo
Substitutes:
GK	13	(Costa Rica) Keylor Navas
DF	2	(France) Raphaël Varane
DF	12	(Brazil) Marcelo		(substituted on) 84'
DF	17	(Spain) Álvaro Arbeloa
MF	22	(Argentina) Ángel Di María
MF	23	(Spain) Isco		(substituted on) 72'
MF	24	(Spain) Asier Illarramendi		(substituted on) 86'
Manager:
(Italy) Carlo Ancelotti

GK	13	(Portugal) Beto
RB	23	(Spain) Coke		(substituted off) 84'
CB	21	(Argentina) Nicolás Pareja
CB	2	(Argentina) Federico Fazio (c)
LB	3	(Spain) Fernando Navarro	(yellow card) 66'
DM	4	(Poland) Grzegorz Krychowiak
DM	6	(Portugal) Daniel Carriço
RW	22	(Spain) Aleix Vidal		(substituted off) 66'
AM	17	(Spain) Denis Suárez		(substituted off) 78'
LW	20	(Spain) Vitolo	(yellow card) 42'
CF	9	(Colombia) Carlos Bacca
Substitutes:
GK	25	(Argentina) Mariano Barbosa
DF	5	(Portugal) Diogo Figueiras		(substituted on) 84'
MF	10	(Spain) José Antonio Reyes		(substituted on) 78'
MF	11	(Spain) Jairo Samperio
MF	12	(Spain) Vicente Iborra
MF	26	(Spain) Luismi
FW	14	(Spain) Iago Aspas		(substituted on) 66'
Manager:
(Spain) Unai Emery

Man of the Match:
Cristiano Ronaldo (Real Madrid)

Assistant referees:
Simon Beck (England)
Stuart Burt (England)
Fourth official:
Darren England (England)
Additional assistant referees:
Michael Oliver (England)
Anthony Taylor (England)

**Match rules**

- 90 minutes.
- 30 minutes of extra time if necessary.
- Penalty shoot-out if scores still level.
- Seven named substitutes, of which up to three may be used.

=== Statistics ===
First half
Statistic	Real Madrid	Sevilla
Goals scored	1	0
Total shots	10	4
Shots on target	3	2
Saves	2	2
Ball possession	58%	42%
Corner kicks	9	3
Fouls committed	9	8
Offsides	2	1
Yellow cards	1	1
Red cards	0	0

Second half
Statistic	Real Madrid	Sevilla
Goals scored	1	0
Total shots	8	7
Shots on target	4	1
Saves	1	3
Ball possession	48%	52%
Corner kicks	3	5
Fouls committed	8	6
Offsides	1	0
Yellow cards	1	1
Red cards	0	0

Overall
Statistic	Real Madrid	Sevilla
Goals scored	2	0
Total shots	18	11
Shots on target	7	3
Saves	3	5
Ball possession	53%	47%
Corner kicks	12	8
Fouls committed	17	14
Offsides	3	1
Yellow cards	2	2
Red cards	0	0

== See also ==
- 2014–15 UEFA Champions League
- 2014–15 UEFA Europa League
- 2014–15 Real Madrid CF season
- 2014–15 Sevilla FC season
- 2016 UEFA Super Cup – contested between same teams
- Real Madrid CF in international football
- Sevilla FC in European football
- Spanish football clubs in international competitions
