= 1938–39 S.L. Benfica season =

Benfica
1938–39 season
- President: Júlio Ribeiro da Costa
- Head coach: Lippo Hertzka
- Stadium: Estádio das Amoreiras
- Primeira Divisão: 3rd
- Taça de Portugal: Final
- Campeonato de Lisboa: 3rd
- Top goalscorer: League: Espírito Santo (13); All: Espírito Santo (23)
- Biggest win: Benfica 10–1 Casa Pia (16 April 1939); Nacional 0–9 Benfica (27 May 1939)
- Biggest defeat: Porto 6–1 Benfica (11 June 1939)
Home colours	Away colours

The 1938–39 season was Sport Lisboa e Benfica's 34th season in existence and the club's 5th consecutive season in the top flight of Portuguese football, covering the period from 1 September 1938 to 30 June 1939. Benfica competed in the Primeira Divisão, the Taça de Portugal and in the Campeonato de Lisboa.

Benfica entered the season aiming to defend its league title and to reclaim both the Campeonato de Lisboa and the Campeonato de Portugal now rebranded as Taça de Portugal. The team finished third in the regional championship and third in the Primeira Divisão after narrowly missing out on the title in a decisive final-day draw against Porto. In the Taça de Portugal, Benfica produced a remarkable comeback in the semi-finals but ultimately fell 4–3 to Académica in the final.

== Season summary ==
Benfica entered the season seeking a fourth consecutive league title, as well as the Campeonato de Portugal and the Campeonato de Lisboa, competitions it had failed to win in each of the previous three seasons. After guiding the team to a third straight league championship, Hungarian coach Lippo Hertzka remained in charge for his third year at the club. During the off-season, Domingos Lopes left for Lusitano VRSA, while Pedro Ferreira departed to join Belenenses. The club’s main arrivals were Alexandre Brito from Lusitano de Évora and António Martins from Sporting.

Before the start of the Campeonato de Lisboa, Benfica played three friendlies, recording one win, one draw and one loss. Two of these matches were against rivals Belenenses and Sporting, including a 3–3 draw with Sporting.

Benfica began the Campeonato de Lisboa with an away match against Sporting in the first Derby de Lisboa of the season, losing 2–1. The team responded with two victories over Carcavelinhos and União de Lisboa, but on the fourth matchday suffered a 4–0 defeat to Belenenses, dropping to third place, three points off the top. Benfica opened November with a win over Casa Pia before hosting Sporting, earning a 3–2 victory and drawing level on points with both Belenenses and Sporting.

On the seventh matchday, a surprising 2–0 loss to Carcavelinhos left the team one point behind both rivals. Benfica defeated União de Lisboa in the following round, but a 1–1 draw with Belenenses practically handed the title to Sporting or Belenenses, as Benfica would need both teams to lose their final match. A subsequent 3–2 loss to Casa Pia meant Benfica finished in third place, four points behind champions Sporting.

Before the start of the Primeira Divisão, Benfica played two Christmas friendly matches. On 25 December, a 4–4 draw with Porto, and six days later a 5–1 win over Barreirense. The team began their league title defence with a 4–0 win over Académica, followed by a 1–0 away victory against Sporting in the third Derby de Lisboa of the season. Benfica closed the month with a 4–3 away win over Académico F.C., ending the third matchday in first place.

On 29 January, Benfica hosted Belenenses, losing 4–3 after having taken a three-goal lead by the 19th minute, dropping to second place, two points behind Porto. A subsequent 1–1 draw with Barreirense left the team one point behind both rivals. Benfica concluded February with a 1–0 win over Casa Pia.

On 5 March, Benfica hosted Porto in the first O Clássico of the season, winning 4–1 and cutting their rival’s lead to one point. The result was followed by a 3–3 draw with Académica, but Benfica remained one point behind as Porto also dropped points.

On 19 March, Benfica faced Sporting for the fourth time that season, losing 4–1 and falling to third place, three points off the top. The team responded with a 5–2 win over Académico F.C.. With no margin for error remaining, Benfica visited Belenenses on 2 April, winning 3–2 in a hard-fought match. With Sporting drawing and Porto losing, Benfica drew level with the former and moved to within two points of the latter. The team won their subsequent matches, scoring 14 goals, leaving the title to be decided on the final matchday.

On the final matchday, with Sporting and Benfica level on points and Porto two points ahead, Benfica faced Porto in a decisive O Clássico at the Campo da Constituição. Due to having the best record in the three-way head-to-head among the contenders, three victories against Porto’s and Sporting’s one each, Benfica would win the league with a victory, even if Sporting also won their match. Porto opened the scoring through Costuras in the second minute, but Rogério equalised for Benfica in the seventh. Santos restored Porto’s lead in the 44th minute, allowing the home team to reach halftime ahead. Alexandre Brito levelled the match again in the 47th minute, but a second goal from Santos in the 61st minute put Porto 3–2 up. Brito responded immediately with his second goal of the match to make it 3–3. Knowing that only a win would secure the title, Benfica pressed intensely for a fourth goal, and a last-minute effort, celebrated by the Benfica player, appeared to have earned the championship. However, the referee disallowed the goal for unknown reasons, and the match ended 3–3, leaving Benfica in third place.

After the conclusion of the league, Benfica entered the Taça de Portugal, dispatching Luso Beja 8–1 on aggregate in the round of 16. In the quarter-finals, the team defeated CD Nacional 13–1 on aggregate, setting up another O Clássico in the semi-finals. A heavy 6–1 loss in the first leg left Benfica on the brink of elimination, but on 18 June, in the second leg, a 6–0 victory over Porto, featuring doubles from Espírito Santo and Valadas, secured the club’s place in the final. On 25 June, Benfica faced Académica in the Taça de Portugal final, losing 4–3.

== Competitions ==
Win Draw Loss Postponed

=== Overall record ===
Competition	First match	Last match	Record								
Competition	First match	Last match	G	W	D	L	GF	GA	GD	Win %	Source
Primeira Divisão	8 January 1939	23 April 1939	14	9	3	2	44	24	+20	64.29	
Taça de Portugal	14 May 1939	25 June 1939	7	5	0	2	31	11	+20	71.43	
Campeonato de Lisboa	2 October 1938	22 December 1938	10	5	1	4	23	18	+5	50.00	
Total			31	19	4	8	98	53	+45	61.29	

=== Primeira Divisão ===
==== League table ====
Pos	Team	Pld	W	D	L	GF	GA	GD	Pts
1	Porto (C)	14	10	3	1	57	20	+37	23
2	Sporting CP	14	10	2	2	44	17	+27	22
3	Benfica	14	9	3	2	44	24	+20	21
4	Belenenses	14	6	1	7	38	29	+9	13
5	Académica	14	4	3	7	27	39	−12	11

(C) Champions

==== Results by round ====
Round	1	2	3	4	5	6	7	8	9	10	11	12	13	14
Ground	H	A	A	H	A	A	H	A	H	H	A	H	H	A
Result	W	W	W	L	D	W	W	D	L	W	W	W	W	D
Position	1	2	1	2	3	2	2	2	3	3	3	3	3	3

Source: ForaDeJogo
A = Away; H = Home; W = Win; D = Draw; L = Loss

==== Matches ====
8 January 1939 1	Benfica	4–0	Académica	Lisbon
	Brito 4', 85'; Espírito Santo 50'; Rogério 75'			Stadium: Estádio das Amoreiras; Referee: Cunha Pinto

15 January 1939 2	Sporting	0–1	Benfica	Lisbon
			17' Brito	Stadium: Stadium de Lisboa; Referee: Vale Ramos

22 January 1939 3	Académico F.C.	3–4	Benfica	Porto
	Castro 36', 57'; Mesquita 48'		16' Valadas; 24' Rogério; 51', 70' Espírito Santo	Stadium: Estádio do Lima; Referee: Gabriel Fonseca

29 January 1939 4	Benfica	3–4	Belenenses	Lisbon
	Albino 10'; Espírito Santo 15'; Cabeças 19'		40', 42', 83' Jesus; 65' Nóia	Stadium: Estádio das Amoreiras; Referee: Henrique Rosa

5 February 1939 5	Barreirense	1–1	Benfica	Lagos
	Januário 60'		65' Cabeças	Stadium: Campo Rossio Trindade; Referee: Amável Carvalho

26 February 1939 6	Casa Pia	0–1	Benfica	Lisbon
			87' Espírito Santo	Stadium: Estádio do Restelo; Referee: Abel Ferreira

5 March 1939 7	Benfica	4–1	Porto	Lisbon
	Pinto 25' (pen.); Brito 44'; Duarte 59'; Espírito Santo 60'		30' Pinga	Stadium: Estádio das Amoreiras; Referee: Henrique Rosa

12 March 1939 8	Académica	3–3	Benfica	Coimbra
	Carneiro 52', 56'; Costa 60'		14' Valadas; 36' Rogério; 76' Espírito Santo	Referee: António Palhinhas

19 March 1939 9	Benfica	1–4	Sporting	Lisbon
	Valadas 38'		47', 51' Peyroteo; 72' Cruz; 79' Mourão	Stadium: Estádio das Amoreiras; Referee: Eduardo Augusto

26 March 1939 10	Benfica	5–2	Académico F.C.	Lisbon
	Espírito Santo 7', 75'; Barbosa 23'; Duarte 65', 88'		40' Oliveira; 53' Pereira	Stadium: Estádio das Amoreiras; Referee: António Palhinhas

2 April 1939 11	Belenenses	2–3	Benfica	Lisbon
	Jesus 2'; Correia 85'		14' Espírito Santo; 15' Macarrão; 68' Albino	Stadium: Estádio José Manuel Soares; Referee: Guilhermino Sarriá

9 April 1939 12	Benfica	1–0	Barreirense	Lisbon
	Brito 43'			Stadium: Estádio das Amoreiras; Referee: Santos Palma

16 April 1939 13	Casa Pia	13–1	Benfica	Lisbon
	Rogério 4'; Espírito Santo 30', 49', 68'; Valadas 31'; Albino 37' (pen.); Brito 51', 82'; Barbosa 60'; Pinto 87'		25' Dias	Stadium: Estádio das Amoreiras; Referee: João Vaz

23 April 1939 14	Porto	3–3	Benfica	Porto
	Santos 2', 61'; Costuras 44'		7' Rogério; 47', 62' Brito	Stadium: Campo da Constituição; Referee: Henrique Rosa

=== Taça de Portugal ===
==== Round of 16 ====
14 May 1939; First leg	Luso Beja	1–5	Benfica	Beja
			2', 30' Duarte; 40' Rogério; 47' Barbosa; 80' Brito	Stadium: Estádio Condessa de Avillez; Referee: António Palhinhas

21 May 1939; Second leg	Benfica	3–0 (1–4 agg.)	Luso Beja	Lisbon
	Valadas 10', 85'; Duarte 30'			Stadium: Estádio das Amoreiras; Referee: Costa Marques

==== Quarter-Finals ====
27 May 1939; First leg	Nacional	0–9	Benfica	Lisbon
			4' 8' Valadas; 32' Rogério; Barbosa	Stadium: Stadium do Lumiar; Referee: Álvaro Santos

4 June 1939; Second leg	Benfica	4–0 (13–0 agg.)	Nacional	Lisbon
	Duarte 57'; Ferreira 89' (pen.)			Stadium: Estádio das Amoreiras; Referee: Santos Palma

==== Semi-Finals ====
11 June 1939; First leg	Porto	6–1	Benfica	Porto
	Carneiro 6'; Costuras 16', 69'; Pinga 46'; Nunes 62', 81'		22' Brito	Stadium: Estádio do Lima; Referee: Santos Palma

18 June 1939; Second leg	Benfica	6–0 (7–6 agg.)	Porto	Lisbon
	Espírito Santo 26', 65'; Valadas 55', 71'; Barbosa 60'; Rogério 68'		Goal	Stadium: Estádio das Amoreiras; Referee: António Palhinhas

==== Final ====
25 June 1939	Académica	4–3	Benfica	Lisbon
	Pimenta 36'; Gomes 46'; Carneiro 52', 53'		9', 47' Rogério; 73' Brito	Stadium: Estádio José Manuel Soares; Referee: António Palhinhas

=== Campeonato de Lisboa ===
Pos	Team	Pld	W	D	L	GF	GA	GD	Pts
1	Sporting (C)	10	7	1	2	53	13	+40	25
2	Belenenses	10	5	4	1	24	15	+9	24
3	Benfica	10	5	1	4	23	18	+5	21
4	Casa Pia	10	4	1	5	17	37	−20	19
5	Carcavelinhos	10	3	2	5	17	32	−15	18
6	União de Lisboa	10	1	1	8	9	28	−19	13

(C) Champions

2 October 1938 1	Sporting	2–1	Benfica	Lisbon
	Pireza 47'; Peyroteo 65'		70' (o.g.) Galvão	Stadium: Stadium de Lisboa; Referee: Claudino Nunes

9 October 1938 2	Benfica	6–0	Carcavelinhos	Lisbon
	Espírito Santo 14', 78', 79', 89'; Valadas 16'; Brito 43'			Stadium: Estádio das Amoreiras; Referee: Armelim Martins

16 October 1938 3	União de Lisboa	1–3	Benfica	Lisbon
15:10	Quintas 30'		46' Rogério; 59', 82' Espírito Santo	Stadium: Campo de Santo Amaro; Referee: José António Diniz

23 October 1938 4	Belenenses	4–0	Benfica	Lisbon
	Jesus 5'; Gomes 8'; Marques 73' (pen.); Correia 89'			Stadium: Estádio José Manuel Soares; Referee: Abel Ferreira

13 November 1938 5	Benfica	5–2	Casa Pia	Lisbon
	Baptista 10'; Espírito Santo 55', 76'; Cabeças 61', 89'		58', 62' Barbosa	Stadium: Estádio das Amoreiras; Referee: Neves de Carvalho

20 November 1938 6	Benfica	3–2	Sporting	Lisbon
	Baptista 59'; Cabeças 60'; Olegário 76'		52', 64' Peyroteo	Stadium: Estádio das Amoreiras; Referee: Armelim Martins

27 November 1938 7	Carcavelinhos	2–0	Benfica	Lisbon
	Pratas 55', 90'			Stadium: Estádio da Tapadinha; Referee: Abel Ferreira

4 December 1938 8	Benfica	2–1	União de Lisboa	Lisbon
	Brito 21'; Albino 76'		40' Casimiro	Stadium: Estádio das Amoreiras; Referee: Adolfo Marques

11 December 1938 9	Benfica	1–1	Belenenses	Lisbon
	Cabeças 67'		31' Soares	Stadium: Estádio das Amoreiras; Referee: Abel Ferreira

19 December 1938 10	Casa Pia	3–2	Benfica	Lisbon
	Barbosa 9', 38'; Marques 53'		49' Duarte; 60' Brito	Stadium: Campo do Restelo; Referee: Claudino Nunes

=== Non-Official matches ===
11 September 1938; B.S.B. Tournament	Benfica	3–3	Sporting	Lisbon
	Valadas 4'; Lopes 7'; Brito 13'		30' Cruz; 67', 69' Peyroteo	Stadium: Campo das Salésias; Referee: Manuel da Silva

18 September 1938; B.S.B. Tournament	Benfica	1–4	Belenenses	Lisbon
	Espírito Santo 27'		15' Jesus; 18', 71' Bernardo; 70' Rafael	Stadium: Campo das Salésias; Referee: Cláudio Nunes

25 September 1939	Barreirense	1–5	Benfica	Barreiro

25 December 1938; Christmas Tournament	Porto	4–4	Benfica	Porto
				Stadium: Estádio do Lima; Referee: Manuel do Vale Ramos

1 January 1939; Christmas Tournament	Belenenses	1–4	Benfica	Lisbon
				Stadium: Campo das Salésias

3 May 1939	Marinhense	1–5	Benfica	Marinha Grande
				Stadium: Campo da Marinha Grande; Referee: Aurélio Peixoto de Carvalho

== Player statistics ==
The squad for the season consisted of the players listed in the tables below, as well as staff member Lippo Hertzka (manager).

Note 1: Note: Flags indicate national team as defined under FIFA eligibility rules. Players may hold more than one non-FIFA nationality.

Note 2: Players with squad numbers marked ‡ joined the club during the 1938-39 season via transfer, with more details in the following section.

No.	Pos	Nat	Player	Total		Primeira Divisão		Taça de Portugal		Campeonato de Lisboa	
No.	Pos	Nat	Player	Apps	Goals	Apps	Goals	Apps	Goals	Apps	Goals
1	GK	(Portugal) POR	António Martins	28	0	12	0	7	0	9	0
1	GK	(Portugal) POR	Augusto Amaro	2	0	1	0	0	0	1	0
1	GK	(Portugal) POR	Mário da Rosa	1	0	1	0	0	0	0	0
	DF	(Portugal) POR	Francisco Elói	0	0	0	0	0	0	0	0
	DF	(Portugal) POR	Ricardo Freire	3	0	3	0	0	0	0	0
2	DF	(Portugal) POR	António Vieira	24	0	9	0	5	0	10	0
2	MF	(Portugal) POR	João Correia	4	0	2	0	2	0	0	0
3	DF	(Portugal) POR	Gustavo Teixeira	30	0	14	0	7	0	9	0
	MF	(Portugal) POR	César Ferreira	3	0	1	0	1	0	1	0
	MF	(Portugal) POR	Domingos Lopes	2	0	1	0	0	0	1	0
	MF	(Portugal) POR	Francisco Baptista	0	0	0	0	0	0	0	0
	MF	(Portugal) POR	Joaquim Alcobia	3	0	1	0	0	0	2	0
	MF	(Portugal) POR	Raul Baptista	11	2	3	0	1	0	7	2
4	MF	(Portugal) POR	Gaspar Pinto	30	2	14	2	7	0	9	0
5	MF	(Portugal) POR	Francisco Albino	27	4	12	3	5	0	10	1
6	MF	(Portugal) POR	Francisco Ferreira	24	1	12	0	7	1	5	0
7	MF	(Portugal) POR	Feliciano Barbosa	28	5	13	2	7	3	8	0
	FW	(Portugal) POR	Amadeu Cabeças	8	6	2	2	0	0	6	4
	FW	(Portugal) POR	Augusto Duarte	8	10	4	3	3	6	1	1
	FW	(Portugal) POR	Joaquim Macarrão	2	1	1	1	1	0	0	0
	FW	(Portugal) POR	Luís Xavier	4	0	1	0	0	0	3	0
	FW	(Portugal) POR	Olegário de Sousa	7	1	0	0	1	0	6	1
8	FW	(Portugal) POR	Rogério Sousa	18	14	9	5	7	8	2	1
9	FW	(Portugal) POR	Guilherme Espírito Santo	27	23	14	13	4	2	9	8
10	FW	(Portugal) POR	Alexandre Brito	25	15	13	9	6	3	6	3
11	FW	(Portugal) POR	Alfredo Valadas	22	13	11	4	6	8	5	1

== Transfers ==
=== In ===
Position	Player	From	Fee	Ref
GR	António Martins	Sporting	Undisclosed	
DF	Francisco Elói	Barreirense	Undisclosed	
MF	César Ferreira	SL Beja	Undisclosed	
MF	Francisco Baptista	Barreirense	Undisclosed	
FW	Alexandre Brito	Lusitano de Évora	Undisclosed	

=== Out ===
Position	Player	To	Fee	Ref
MF	Pedro Ferreira	CF Os Belenenses	Undisclosed	
FW	Domingos Lopes	Lusitano VRSA	Undisclosed	
FW	José Gomes	Barreirense	Undisclosed	
