= 1948 Taça de Portugal final =

- Event: 1947–48 Taça de Portugal
| Belenenses | Sporting CP |
| 1 | 3 |
- Date: 4 July 1948
- Venue: Estádio Nacional, Oeiras
- Referee: Libertino Domingues (Setúbal)

The 1948 Taça de Portugal final was the final match of the 1947–48 Taça de Portugal, the 9th season of the Taça de Portugal, the premier Portuguese football cup competition organized by the Portuguese Football Federation (FPF). The match was played on 4 July 1948 at the Estádio Nacional in Oeiras, and opposed two Primeira Liga sides: Belenenses and Sporting CP. Sporting CP defeated Belenenses 3–1 to claim their fourth Taça de Portugal.

== Match ==
=== Details ===
4 July 1948

| Belenenses | 1–3 | Sporting CP |
|---|---|---|
| Teixeira da Silva 52' | | Peyroteo 30', 65'; Albano 34' (pen.) |

Estádio Nacional, Oeiras
Referee: Libertino Domingues (Setúbal)

| Belenenses | Sporting CP |

| GK | 1 | (Portugal) José Sério |
| DF | | (Portugal) Vasco Oliveira |
| DF | | (Portugal) Serafim Neves |
| DF | | (Portugal) António Figueiredo |
| DF | | (Portugal) António Feliciano |
| MF | | (Portugal) António Nunes |
| MF | | (Portugal) Fernando Matos |
| MF | | (Portugal) Teixeira da Silva |
| MF | | (Portugal) António Castela |
| FW | | (Portugal) Pinto de Almeida |
| FW | | (Portugal) Artur Quaresma (c) |
Substitutes:
Manager:
(Argentina) Alejandro Scopelli

| GK | 1 | (Portugal) João Azevedo |
| DF | | (Portugal) Juvenal Silva |
| DF | | (Portugal) Álvaro Cardoso |
| MF | | (Portugal) Manuel Marques (c) |
| MF | | (Portugal) Veríssimo Alves |
| MF | | (Portugal) Carlos Canário |
| FW | | (Portugal) Fernando Peyroteo |
| FW | | (Portugal) José Travassos |
| FW | | (Portugal) Jesus Correia |
| FW | | (Portugal) Manuel Vasques |
| FW | | (Portugal) Albano |
Substitutes:
Manager:
(Portugal) Cândido de Oliveira

1947–48 Taça de Portugal Winners
Sporting CP
4th Title

Match officials

- Assistant referees:
- Fourth official:

Match rules

- 90 minutes.
