= 1941 Taça de Portugal final =

- Event: 1940–41 Taça de Portugal
Belenenses	Sporting CP
1	4
- Date: 22 June 1941
- Venue: Campo das Salésias, Lisbon
- Referee: Álvaro Santos (Coimbra)

The 1941 Taça de Portugal final was the final match of the 1940–41 Taça de Portugal, the 3rd season of the Taça de Portugal, the premier Portuguese football cup competition organized by the Portuguese Football Federation (FPF). The match was played on 22 June 1941 at the Campo das Salésias in Lisbon, and opposed two Primeira Liga sides: Belenenses and Sporting CP. Sporting CP defeated Belenenses 4–1 to claim their first Taça de Portugal.

== Match ==
=== Details ===
22 June 1941

Belenenses	1–4	Sporting CP
Gilberto 53'		Cruz 36', 48', 52'; Peyroteo 79'

Campo das Salésias, Lisbon
Referee: Álvaro Santos (Coimbra)

Belenenses	Sporting CP

GK	1	(Portugal) Salvador Jorge
DF		(Argentina) Oscar Tellechea
DF		(Portugal) António Feliciano
DF		(Portugal) José Simões
MF		(Portugal) Francisco Gomes
MF		(Portugal) Mariano Amaro (c)
MF		(Portugal) Gilberto
FW		(Argentina) Horácio Tellechea
FW		(Portugal) Varela Marques
FW		(Portugal) Bernardo Soares
FW		(Portugal) Rafael Correia
Substitutes:
Manager:
(Portugal) Artur José Pereira

GK	1	(Portugal) João Azevedo
DF		(Portugal) Octávio Barrosa
DF		(Portugal) Álvaro Cardoso
MF		(Portugal) Manuel Marques (c)
MF		(Portugal) Aníbal Paciência
MF		(Portugal) Gregório dos Santos
FW		(Portugal) Fernando Peyroteo
FW		(Portugal) Armando Ferreira
FW		(Portugal) João Cruz
FW		(Portugal) Adolfo Mourão
FW		(Portugal) Manuel Soeiro
Substitutes:
Manager:
(Hungary) József Szabó

1940–41 Taça de Portugal Winners
Sporting CP
1st Title

Match officials

- Assistant referees:
- Fourth official:

Match rules

- 90 minutes.
