= 1942 Taça de Portugal final =

- Event: 1941–42 Taça de Portugal
Belenenses	Vitória de Guimarães
2	0
- Date: 12 July 1942
- Venue: Estádio do Lumiar, Lisbon
- Referee: Vieira da Costa (Porto)

The 1942 Taça de Portugal final was the final match of the 1941–42 Taça de Portugal, the 4th season of the Taça de Portugal, the premier Portuguese football cup competition organized by the Portuguese Football Federation (FPF). The match was played on 12 July 1942 at the Estádio do Lumiar in Lisbon, and opposed two Primeira Liga sides: Belenenses and Vitória de Guimarães. Belenenses defeated Vitória de Guimarães 2–0 to claim their first Taça de Portugal.

== Match ==
=== Details ===
12 July 1942

Belenenses	2–0	Vitória de Guimarães
Quaresma 40'; Gilberto 46'

Estádio do Lumiar, Lisbon
Referee: Vieira da Costa (Porto)

Belenenses	Vitória de Guimarães

GK	1	(Portugal) Salvador Jorge
DF		(Portugal) António Feliciano
DF		(Portugal) José Simões
DF		(Portugal) Serafim Neves
MF		(Portugal) Mariano Amaro (c)
MF		(Portugal) Francisco Gomes
MF		(Portugal) Gilberto
MF		(Portugal) António Eloi
FW		(Portugal) Artur Quaresma
FW		(Portugal) José Pedro
FW		(Portugal) Franklim Oliveira
Substitutes:
Manager:
(Portugal) Rodolfo Faroleiro

GK	1	(Portugal) Machado
DF		(Portugal) Lino
DF		(Portugal) João
DF		(Portugal) Castelo
MF		(Portugal) Laureta
MF		(Portugal) José Maria
MF		(Portugal) Zeferino
FW		(Portugal) Miguel
FW		(Portugal) Alexandre (c)
FW		(Portugal) Ferraz
FW		(Portugal) Arlindo
Substitutes:
Manager:
(Portugal) Alberto Augusto

1941–42 Taça de Portugal Winners
Belenenses
1st Title

Match officials

- Assistant referees:
- Fourth official:

Match rules

- 90 minutes.
