= 1928 Campeonato de Portugal final =

- Event: 1927–28 Campeonato de Portugal
| Carcavelinhos | Sporting CP |
| 3 | 1 |
- Date: 30 June 1928
- Venue: Campo de Palhavã, Lisbon
- Referee: Silvestre Rosmaninho (Lisbon)

The 1928 Campeonato de Portugal Final was the final match of the 1927–28 Campeonato de Portugal, the 7th season of the Campeonato de Portugal, the Portuguese football knockout tournament, organized by the Portuguese Football Federation (FPF). The match was played on 30 June 1928 at the Campo de Palhavã in Lisbon, and opposed Carcavelinhos and Sporting CP. Carcavelinhos defeated Sporting CP 3–1 to claim their first Campeonato de Portugal.

== Match ==
=== Details ===
30 June 1928

| Carcavelinhos | 3–1 | Sporting CP |
|---|---|---|
| Domingues 20', 53'; Rodrigues 75' | | Mendes 52' |

Campo de Palhavã, Lisbon
Referee: Silvestre Rosmaninho (Lisbon)

| Carcavelinhos | Sporting CP |

| GK | (Portugal) Gabriel Santos |
| DF | (Portugal) Abreu |
| DF | (Portugal) Carlos Alves |
| MF | (Portugal) Carlos Domingues |
| MF | (Portugal) Daniel Vicente |
| MF | (Portugal) Artur Pereira |
| FW | (Portugal) Armando Silva |
| FW | (Portugal) Manuel Rodrigues |
| FW | (Portugal) Carlos Canuto (c) |
| FW | (Portugal) Manuel Abrantes |
| FW | (Portugal) José Domingues |
Substitutes:
Manager:
(Portugal) Carlos Canuto

| GK | (Portugal) Cipriano Santos |
| DF | (Portugal) Jorge Vieira (c) |
| DF | (Portugal) António Penafiel |
| DF | (Portugal) Martinho Oliveira |
| DF | (Portugal) João Jurado |
| MF | (Portugal) Francisco Serra e Moura |
| MF | (Portugal) Manuel Matias |
| FW | (Portugal) José Manuel Martins |
| FW | (Portugal) Agostinho Cervantes |
| FW | (Portugal) João Francisco Maia |
| FW | (Portugal) António Abrantes Mendes |
Substitutes:
Manager:
(Portugal) Filipe dos Santos

1927–28 Campeonato de Portugal Winners
Carcavelinhos
1st Title

Match officials

- Assistant referees:
- Fourth official:

Match rules

- 90 minutes.
