= 1939 Taça de Portugal final =

- Event: 1938–39 Taça de Portugal
| Académica | Benfica |
| 4 | 3 |
- Date: 25 June 1939
- Venue: Campo das Salésias, Lisbon
- Referee: António Palhinhas (Setúbal)

The 1939 Taça de Portugal final was the final match of the 1938–39 Taça de Portugal, the 1st season of the Taça de Portugal, the premier Portuguese football cup competition organized by the Portuguese Football Federation (FPF). The match was played on 25 June 1939 at the Campo das Salésias in Lisbon, and opposed two Primeira Liga sides: Académica and Benfica. Académica defeated Benfica 4–3 to claim the first Taça de Portugal.

== Match ==
=== Details ===
25 June 1939

| Académica | 4–3 | Benfica |
|---|---|---|
| Manuel da Costa 39'; Gomes 46'; Carneiro 51', 53' | | Rogério de Sousa 9', 47'; Alexandre Brito 73' |

Campo das Salésias, Lisbon
Referee: António Palhinhas (Setúbal)

| Académica | Benfica |

| GK | 1 | (Portugal) Tibério Antunes |
| DF | | (Portugal) José Maria Antunes |
| DF | | (Brazil) César Machado |
| MF | | (Portugal) Octaviano de Oliveira |
| MF | | (Portugal) Bernardo Pimenta |
| MF | | (Portugal) António Conceição |
| MF | | (Portugal) Manuel da Costa |
| MF | | Alexandre Portugal (c) |
| MF | | (Portugal) Faustino Duarte |
| FW | | (Portugal) Arnaldo Carneiro |
| FW | | (Portugal) Alberto Gomes |
Substitutes:
Manager:
(Portugal) Albano Paulo

| GK | 1 | (Portugal) António Martins |
| DF | | (Portugal) Gustavo Teixeira |
| DF | | (Portugal) João Correia |
| DF | | (Portugal) Álvaro Gaspar Pinto |
| MF | | (Portugal) Feliciano Barbosa |
| MF | | (Portugal) Francisco Ferreira (c) |
| MF | | (Portugal) Francisco Albino |
| MF | | (Portugal) Guilherme Espírito Santo |
| FW | | (Portugal) Alexandre Brito |
| FW | | (Portugal) Alfredo Valadas |
| FW | | (Portugal) Rogério de Sousa |
Substitutes:
Manager:
(Hungary) Lippo Hertzka

1938–39 Taça de Portugal Winners
Académica
1st Title

Match officials

- Assistant referees:
- Fourth official:

Match rules

- 90 minutes.
