= 1946 Taça de Portugal final =

- Event: 1945–46 Taça de Portugal
Atlético CP	Sporting CP
2	4
- Date: 30 June 1946
- Venue: Estádio do Lumiar, Lisbon
- Referee: José Lira (Braga)

The 1946 Taça de Portugal final was the final match of the 1945–46 Taça de Portugal, the 8th season of the Taça de Portugal, the premier Portuguese football cup competition organized by the Portuguese Football Federation (FPF). The match was played on 30 June 1946 at the Estádio do Lumiar in Lisbon, and opposed two Primeira Liga sides: Atlético CP and Sporting CP. Sporting CP defeated Atlético CP 4–2 to claim their third Taça de Portugal.

== Match ==
=== Details ===
30 June 1946

Atlético CP	2–4	Sporting CP
Rogério Simões 38'; Marques 88'		Peyroteo 15', 30'; Sidónio 20'; Albano 40'

Estádio do Lumiar, Lisbon
Referee: José Lira (Braga)

Atlético CP	Sporting CP

GK	1	(Portugal) Francisco Correia
DF		(Portugal) José Lopes
DF		(Portugal) Baptista
MF		(Portugal) Marques
MF		(Portugal) Morais
MF		(Portugal) Gregório dos Santos
MF		(Portugal) José Rosário
FW		(Portugal) Francisco Lopes (c)
FW		(Portugal) Joaquim Micael
FW		(Portugal) Rogério Simões
FW		(Portugal) Manuel Costa
Substitutes:
Manager:
(Portugal) Cândido Tavares

GK	1	(Portugal) João Azevedo
DF		(Portugal) Álvaro Cardoso
DF		(Portugal) Octávio Barrosa
DF		(Portugal) Juvenal Silva
MF		(Portugal) Veríssimo Alves
MF		(Portugal) Manuel Marques (c)
FW		(Portugal) Fernando Peyroteo
FW		(Portugal) Albano
FW		(Portugal) Armando Ferreira
FW		(Portugal) António Marques
FW		(Portugal) Sidónio
Substitutes:
Manager:
(Portugal) Cândido de Oliveira

1945–46 Taça de Portugal Winners
Sporting CP
3rd Title

Match officials

- Assistant referees:
- Fourth official:

Match rules

- 90 minutes.
