= Álvaro Cardoso =

Portuguese footballer

Personal information
- Full name: Álvaro Cardoso da Silva
- Date of birth: 14 January 1914
- Place of birth: Setúbal, Portugal
- Date of death: 12 May 2004 (aged 90)
- Position: Central defender

Senior career*
Years	Team	Apps	(Gls)
1933–1938	Vitória Setúbal		
1938–1948	Sporting CP	148	(1)

International career
1941–1947	Portugal	13	(0)

Managerial career
- 1953: Sporting CP
- * Club domestic league appearances and goals

Álvaro Cardoso da Silva (14 January 1914 – 12 May 2004) was a Portuguese footballer who played as a central defender. He was known as Senhor Cardoso during his highly successful spell at Sporting.

== Club career ==
Cardoso played for Vitória Setúbal from 1933 to 1938. In 1938, he joined Sporting, where he would spend ten years at the Lisbon club. He is regarded as one of the best captains of Sporting, having worn the armband during the age of the famous Cinco Violinos ("Five Violins"). In this period, he won the Primeira Divisão four times, the Taça de Portugal four times, as well as the Campeonato de Lisboa four times. His final match for Sporting was in the 1948 Taça de Portugal Final, in a 3–1 win over Belenenses. In all competitions for Sporting, he made 252 appearances and scored three goals.

== International career ==
Cardoso represented Portugal thirteen times, with eleven of those as the captain. He made his debut on 12 January 1941 in Lisbon, against Spain, which finished in a 2–2 draw. He was also part of the team that beat Spain for the first time in an official match, on 26 January 1947. According to legend, he received an anonymous phone call telling him to bury a lucky talisman behind the nets. He received a silver goat horn wrapped in tissue, and asked his teammate Serafim Neves to bury it at night, so that no one would know. He did so, and Portugal won 4–1. Cardoso's final appearance for Portugal was in a 10–0 loss to England, where he demanded to be substituted in the first half, having been humiliated by Tom Finney, the player he was supposed to be marking.

== Managerial career ==
Having been the assistant manager at Sporting for the past two seasons under Randolph Galloway, Cardoso became manager in 1953. However, he lasted ten matches, winning six, drawing one and losing three. He was replaced in the same year by João Joaquim Tavares da Silva.

== Honours ==
=== Club ===
Sporting

- Primeira Divisão: 1940–41, 1943–44, 1946–47, 1947–48
- Taça de Portugal: 1940–41, 1944–45, 1945–46, 1947–48
- Campeonato de Lisboa: 1941–42, 1942–43, 1944–45, 1946–47
