= 1926 Campeonato de Portugal final =

- Event: 1925–26 Campeonato de Portugal
Belenenses	Marítimo
0	2
- Date: 6 June 1926
- Venue: Campo do Ameal, Porto
- Referee: José Guimarães (Porto)

The 1926 Campeonato de Portugal Final was the final match of the 1925–26 Campeonato de Portugal, the 5th season of the Campeonato de Portugal, the Portuguese football knockout tournament, organized by the Portuguese Football Federation (FPF). The match was played on 6 June 1926 at the Campo do Ameal in Porto, and opposed Belenenses and Marítimo. Marítimo defeated Belenenses 2–0 to claim their first Campeonato de Portugal.

== Match ==
=== Details ===
6 June 1926

Belenenses	0–2	Marítimo
		José Fernandes 55'; Manuel Ramos 70'

Campo do Ameal, Porto
Referee: José Guimarães (Porto)

Belenenses	Marítimo

GK	(Portugal) Francisco Assis
DF	(Portugal) Eduardo Azevedo
DF	(Portugal) Júlio Marques
MF	(Portugal) Augusto Silva (c)	(red card) 70'
MF	(Portugal) César de Matos
MF	(Portugal) José Almeida
FW	(Portugal) Rodolfo Faroleiro
FW	(Portugal) Silva Marques
FW	(Portugal) Alfredo Ramos
FW	(Portugal) Pepe
FW	(Portugal) Fernando António
Substitutes:
Manager:
(Portugal) Artur José Pereira

GK	(Portugal) Ângelo Ortega Fernandes
DF	(Portugal) António Sousa
DF	(Portugal) José Correia
MF	(Portugal) Domingos Vasconcelos (c)
MF	(Portugal) António Teixeira
FW	(Portugal) José Ramos
FW	(Portugal) Manuel Ramos
FW	(Portugal) Francisco Lopes
FW	(Portugal) José de Sousa
FW	(Portugal) António Alves
FW	(Portugal) José Fernandes
Substitutes:
Manager:
(Hungary) Francisco Ekker

1925–26 Campeonato de Portugal Winners
Marítimo
1st Title

Match officials

- Assistant referees:
- Fourth official:

Match rules

- 90 minutes.
