= 1927–28 Campeonato de Portugal =

Tournament details
- Country: Portugal
- Dates: 4 March 1928 – 30 June 1928
- Teams: 22

Final positions
- Champions: Carcavelinhos (1st title)
- Runners-up: Sporting CP

Tournament statistics
- Matches played: 25
- Goals scored: 147 (5.88 per match)
- Top goal scorer(s): Abrantes Mendes; José Martins (8 goals)

The 1927–28 Campeonato de Portugal was the 7th edition of the Portuguese football knockout tournament, organized by the Portuguese Football Federation (FPF). The 1927–28 Campeonato de Portugal began on the 4 March 1928. The final was played on the 30 June 1928 at the Campo de Palhavã.

Belenenses were the previous holders, having defeated Vitória de Setúbal 3–0 in the previous season's final. Carcavelinhos defeated Sporting CP, 3–1 in the final to win their first Campeonato de Portugal.

== Semi-finals ==
Ties were played on the 24 June.

| 24 June 1928 | Carcavelinhos | 3–0 | Benfica | Estádio das Amoreiras, Lisbon |
| | Domingues 46', 56'Canuto 52' | | | Referee: António Torres de Sousa |

| 24 June 1928 | Sporting CP | 3–1 | Vitória de Setúbal | Estádio das Amoreiras, Lisbon |
| | A. Mendes 10'; J. Martins 43'; Cervantes 46' | | A. Martins 74' | Referee: José Mota |

== Final ==
30 June 1928

| Carcavelinhos | 3–1 | Sporting CP |
|---|---|---|
| Domingues 20', 53'; Rodrigues 75' | | Mendes 52' |

Campo de Palhavã, Lisbon
Referee: Silvestre Rosmaninho (Lisbon)
