= 1964–65 Taça de Portugal =

Tournament details
- Country: Portugal
- Dates: September 1964 – 4 July 1965

Final positions
- Champions: Vitória Futebol Clube (1st title)
- Runners-up: Benfica

Tournament statistics
- Top goal scorer(s): Eusébio (11 goals)

The 1964–65 Taça de Portugal was the 25th edition of the Portuguese football knockout tournament, organized by the Portuguese Football Federation (FPF). The 1964–65 Taça de Portugal began in September 1964. The final was played on 4 July 1965 at the Estádio Nacional.

Benfica were the previous holders, having defeated Porto 6–2 in the previous season's final. Defending champions Benfica reached the final but were unable to regain the Taça de Portugal as Vitória de Setúbal defeated the Encarnados 3–1 to claim their first Taça de Portugal.

== First round ==
Teams from the Primeira Liga (I) and the Portuguese Second Division (II) entered at this stage. Each side would contest a second round place by playing two matches: one home and one away match. In case the aggregate score after the two games was level, the cup tie would be replayed.

Team 1	Agg.	Team 2	1st leg	2nd leg	3rd leg
Académica de Coimbra (I)	10 – 0	Beira-Mar (II)	9 – 0	1 – 0	
Alhandra (II)	0 – 9	Vitória de Setúbal (I)	0 – 5	0 – 4	
Atlético CP (II)	2 – 12	Benfica (I)	1 – 3	1 – 9	
Boavista (II)	4 – 3	Leça (II)	0 – 1	4 – 2	
Braga (I)	6 – 3	Sintrense (II)	5 – 1	1 – 2	
Cova da Piedade (II)	2 – 3	Farense (II)	2 – 1	0 – 2	
Famalicão (II)	8 – 2	Desportivo de Beja (II)	7 – 1	1 – 1	
Feirense (II)	2 – 8	Belenenses (I)	1 – 4	1 – 4	
Leões Santarém (II)	0 – 3	Sanjoanense (II)	0 – 0	0 – 3	
Lusitano de Évora (I)	7 – 1	Vila Real (II)	5 – 0	2 – 1	
Marinhense (II)	2 – 5	Sporting CP (I)	0 – 4	2 – 1	
Oliveirense (II)	4 – 6	Fabril Barreiro (I)	1 –0	1 – 2	2 – 4
Oriental (II)	3 – 2	Almada (II)	1 – 1	1 – 1	1 – 0
Peniche (II)	1 – 5	Porto (I)	1 – 1	0 – 4	
Portimonense (II)	10 – 1	Torreense (I)	3 – 1	7 – 0	
Salgueiros (II)	4 – 3	Luso (II)	3 – 1	1 – 2	
Seixal (I)	1 – 2	Olhanense (II)	0 – 0	1 – 2	
Sporting da Covilhã (II)	1 – 5	Barreirense (II)	1 – 1	0 – 4	
Sporting de Espinho (II)	5 – 4	União de Lamas (II)	3 – 2	1 – 2	1 – 0
Varzim (I)	4 – 3	Montijo (II)	2 – 2	2 – 1	
Vitória de Guimarães (I)	6 – 3	Leixões (I)	5 – 1	1 – 2	

== Second round ==
Due to the odd number of teams involved at this stage of the competition, Oriental qualified for the next round due to having no opponent to face at this stage of the competition.

Team 1	Agg.	Team 2	1st leg	2nd leg	3rd leg
Barreirense (II)	2 – 5	Fabril Barreiro (I)	1 – 4	1 – 1	
Benfica (I)	5 – 2	Porto (II)	4 – 1	1 – 1	
Boavista (II)	1 – 5	Olhanense (II)	1 – 2	0 – 3	
Braga (I)	6 – 5	Famalicão (II)	4 – 2	2 – 3	
Farense (II)	2 – 4	Sanjoanense (II)	2 – 1	0 – 3	
Lusitano de Évora (I)	2 – 9	Vitória de Setúbal (I)	2 – 3	0 – 6	
Portimonense (II)	6 – 8	Belenenses (I)	2 – 4	3 – 1	1 – 3
Salgueiros (II)	2 – 1	Varzim (I)	1 – 0	0 – 1	1 – 0
Sporting de Espinho (II)	0 – 9	Sporting CP (I)	0 – 1	0 – 8	
Vitória de Guimarães (I)	2 – 0	Académica de Coimbra (I)	1 – 0	1 – 0	

== Third round ==
Due to the odd number of teams involved at this stage of the competition, Belenenses qualified for the next round due to having no opponent to face at this stage of the competition. Micaelense, Sports Angola, União da Madeira and União de Bissau were invited to participate in the competition.

Team 1	Agg.	Team 2	1st leg	2nd leg
Fabril Barreiro (I)	2 – 4	Benfica (I)	2 – 1	0 – 3
Micaelense (N/A)	1 – 3	Braga (I)	0 – 1	1 – 2
Olhanense (II)	7 – 2	União de Bissau (N/A)	4 – 0	3 – 2
Oriental (II)	1 – 7	Sporting CP (I)	1 – 3	0 – 4
União da Madeira (N/A)	1 – 5	Sanjoanense (II)	1 – 2	0 – 3
Vitória de Guimarães (I)	1 – 2	Salgueiros (II)	1 – 1	0 – 1
Vitória de Setúbal (I)	11 – 3	Sports Angola (N/A)	5 – 2	6 – 1

== Quarter-finals ==
Team 1	Agg.	Team 2	1st leg	2nd leg	3rd leg
Sanjoanense (II)	3 – 7	Braga (I)	2 – 3	1 – 4	
Sporting CP (I)	4 – 2	Belenenses (I)	1 – 1	0 – 0	3 – 1
Vitória de Setúbal (I)	9 – 1	Salgueiros (II)	8 – 1	1 – 0	
Benfica (I)	7 – 3	Olhanense (II)	4 – 1	3 – 2	

== Semi-finals ==
Team 1	Agg.	Team 2	1st leg	2nd leg	3rd leg
Vitória de Setúbal (I)	5 – 3	Sporting CP (I)	2 – 2	1 – 1	2 – 0
Braga (I)	1 – 13	Benfica (I)	1 – 4	0 – 9	

== Final ==
4 July 1965

Benfica	1 – 3	Vitória de Setúbal
Cavém 82'	(Report)	José Maria 8'; Graça 57'; Bonjour 83'

Estádio Nacional, Oeiras
Referee: Francisco Guerra (Porto)
