= Vasco Oliveira =

Vasco Oliveira may refer to:

- Vasco Oliveira (footballer, born 1922)
- Vasco Oliveira (footballer, born 2000)
