= 1938–39 Taça de Portugal =

Tournament details
- Country: Portugal
- Teams: 15

Final positions
- Champions: Académica de Coimbra
- Runners-up: Sport Lisboa e Benfica

Tournament statistics
- Matches played: 27

The 1938–39 Taça de Portugal was the first season of the Taça de Portugal (English: Portuguese Cup), the premier Portuguese football knockout competition, organized by the Portuguese Football Federation (FPF). The final was played on 26 June 1939 between Académica de Coimbra and Sport Lisboa e Benfica.

The Taça de Portugal replaced the previous knockout competition, the Campeonato de Portugal (Championship of Portugal), which defined the Portuguese champion.

== Participating teams ==
=== Primeira Divisão ===
(8 Teams)

- Associação Académica de Coimbra – Organismo Autónomo de Futebol
- Académico Futebol Clube "do Porto"
- Futebol Clube Barreirense
- Clube de Futebol Os Belenenses
- Sport Lisboa e Benfica
- Casa Pia Atlético Clube
- Futebol Clube do Porto
- Sporting Clube de Portugal

=== Segunda Divisão ===
(6 Teams)

- Carcavelinhos Football Club
- Sporting Clube Farense
- Luso Sport Clube "Beja"
- Sporting Clube da Covilhã
- Sport Clube Vila Real
- Vitória Sport Clube "de Guimarães"

=== Madeira Championship ===
(1 Team)

- Clube Desportivo Nacional "da Madeira"

=== Bracket ===
First round
1	AA Coimbra	5	3	8
16	Sporting Covilhã	1	2	3
8	Académico FC	2	5	7
9	Casa Pia AC	3	0	3
5	Sporting CP	7	2	9
12	SC Farense	0	1	1
4	CF Belenenses	3	9	12
13	SC Vila Real	3	0	3
6	S.L. Benfica	5	3	8
11	Luso SC (Beja)	1	0	1
3	CD Nacional	-	-	-
14	bye	-	-	-
7	FC Porto	11	2	13
10	Vitória SC	2	3	5
2	Carcavelinhos FC	2	2	4
15	FC Barreirense	1	2	3

Quarter-finals
AA Coimbra	5	2	7
Académico FC	3	1	4
Sporting CP	3	1	4
CF Belenenses	1	1	2
S.L. Benfica	9	4	13
Nacional	0	0	0
FC Porto	3	4	7
Carcavelinhos FC	1	4	5

Semi-finals
AA Coimbra	0	5	5
Sporting CP	2	2	4
S.L. Benfica	1	6	7
FC Porto	6	0	6

Final
AA Coimbra	4
S.L. Benfica	3

== First round ==
In this round entered the teams from Primeira Divisão (1st level) and Segunda Divisão (2nd level).

=== Results ===
Team 1	Agg.	Team 2	1st leg	2nd leg
Académica de Coimbra (1D)	8–3	Sporting da Covilhã (2D)	5–1	3–2
Académico do Porto (1D)	7–3	Casa Pia (1D)	2–3	5–0
Belenenses (1D)	12–3	Vila Real (2D)	3–3	9–0
Benfica (1D)	8–1	Luso Beja (2D)	5–1	3–0
Carcavelinhos (2D)	4–3	Barreirense (1D)	2–1	2–2
Porto (1D)	13–4	Vitória de Guimarães (2D)	11–1	2–3
Sporting CP (1D)	9–1	Farense (2D)	7–0	2–1

== Quarterfinals ==
In this round entered the winner from Madeira Championship and the winners of the previous round.

=== Results ===
Team 1	Agg.	Team 2	1st leg	2nd leg
Académica de Coimbra (1D)	7–4	Académico do Porto (1D)	5–3	2–1
Nacional da Madeira (MC)	0–13	Benfica (1D)	0–9	0–4
Porto (1D)	7–5	Carcavelinhos (2D)	3–1	4–4
Sporting CP (1D)	4–2	Belenenses (2D)	3–1	1–1

== Semifinals ==
=== Results ===
Team 1	Agg.	Team 2	1st leg	2nd leg
Sporting CP (1D)	4–5	Académica de Coimbra (1D)	2–0	2–5
Porto (1D)	6–7	Benfica (1D)	6–1	0–6

== Final ==
26 June 1939

Académica de Coimbra	4 – 3	Benfica

Campo das Salésias, Lisbon
