= Serio =

Serio may refer to:

- Sério, a municipality in Rio Grande do Sul, Brazil
- Serio (river), a river in Lombardy, Italy
  - Cascate del Serio
- 11022 Serio, a main belt asteroid

== People with the surname ==
- José Sério (1922–2010), Portuguese footballer
- Renato Serio (born 1946), Italian composer, conductor and arranger
- Steve Serio (born 1987), American wheelchair basketball player

== Fictional ==
- Serio (HMX-13), a character from the visual novel To Heart
