= Gustavo Teixeira =

Portuguese footballer

Personal information
- Full name: Gustavo Antunes Teixeira
- Date of birth: 26 December 1908
- Place of birth: Vila Real, Portugal
- Date of death: 1 January 1987 (aged 78)
- Position: Defender

Youth career
- 1918–1925: Casa Pia

Senior career*
Years	Team	Apps	(Gls)
1926–1930	Casa Pia	8	(6)
1932–1939	Benfica	71	(0)
Total		79	(6)

International career
1930–1938	Portugal	10	(0)
- * Club domestic league appearances and goals

Gustavo Antunes Teixeira (born 26 December 1908 – 1 January 1987) was a Portuguese footballer who played as defender.

Over the course of 4 seasons, he amassed Primeira Liga totals of 65 games, spending most of his career at Benfica, winning four major titles.

== Career ==
Born in Vila Real in Trás-os-Montes, Teixeira joined Casa Pia at the age of 10, and was deployed as centre forward; a position he excelled and led him to the national team, debuting on 8 June 1930, in a 1–2 defeat against Belgium in Antwerp. He made a further nine caps for Portugal.

After over a decade at Casa Pia, he was invitated to the celebrations of the 28th anniversary of Benfica, on 28 February 1932, where he signed his transfer to Benfica. Ribeiro dos Reis used him instead as a half-back, on his debut on 13 November 1932 in a home win against Carcavelinhos. In his first year, he helped the club conquer the Campeonato de Lisboa, that was missing for 13 years.

In 1934, Vítor Gonçalves, noticed Teixeira's technical prowess and calmness with the ball and pushed him further back, as a left-sided full-back, and gave him the captain armband, which he would wear for four years in 174 games, taking part in the first three Primeira Liga titles for the club. He retired at 31 on 25 June 1939, in a 3–4 loss for the 1939 Taça de Portugal Final, with 157 official matches and 2 goals.

== Honours ==
Benfica

- Primeira Divisão: 1935–36, 1936–37, 1937–38
- Campeonato de Portugal: 1934–35
- Campeonato de Lisboa: 1932–33
