= 1938–39 Primeira Divisão =

5th season of top-tier Portuguese football

Primeira Divisão
- Season: 1938–39
- Champions: F.C. Porto; 2nd title
- Matches: 56
- Goals: 273 (4.88 per match)

The 1938–39 Primeira Divisão season was the fifth season of top-tier football in Portugal. The competition was renamed Campeonato Nacional da Primeira Divisão (National Championship of the First Division) or Primeira Divisão for short.

== Overview ==
Location of teams in the 1938–39 Liga

It was contested by 8 teams, and F.C. Porto won the championship.

== League standings ==
Pos	Team	Pld	W	D	L	GF	GA	GD	Pts
1	Porto (C)	14	10	3	1	57	20	+37	23
2	Sporting CP	14	10	2	2	44	17	+27	22
3	Benfica	14	9	3	2	44	24	+20	21
4	Belenenses	14	6	1	7	38	29	+9	13
5	Académica	14	4	3	7	27	39	−12	11
6	Barreirense	14	4	2	8	21	27	−6	10
7	Académico	14	5	0	9	30	61	−31	10
8	Casa Pia	14	1	0	13	12	56	−44	2

Source: RSSSF
(C) Champions

== Results ==
Home \ Away	ACA	ACD	BAR	BEL	BEN	CPI	POR	SCP
Académica		5–4	3–1	0–0	3–3	4–0	1–2	2–2
Académico	6–2		3–2	3–1	3–4	1–0	1–12	2–5
Barreirense	3–2	6–0		0–2	1–1	3–1	0–0	0–3
Belenenses	8–1	7–2	1–2		2–3	7–1	1–3	0–2
Benfica	4–0	5–2	1–0	3–4		10–1	4–1	1–4
Casa Pia	0–2	1–3	2–1	2–3	0–1		1–2	2–4
Porto	3–1	4–0	6–1	5–2	3–3	10–0		2–1
Sporting CP	3–1	7–0	2–1	2–0	0–1	5–1	4–4	

Source: RSSSF
Legend: Blue = home team win; Yellow = draw; Red = away team win.
