= Sándor Peics =

Hungarian footballer and manager

Personal information
- Date of birth: 10 October 1899
- Place of birth: Pécs, Austria-Hungary
- Date of death: 1965
- Position: Midfielder

Senior career*
Years	Team	Apps	(Gls)
19xx–1921	Pécsi MFC		
1921–1925	Újpest	65	(1)
1926–1927	Hellas Verona	31	(1)
1927–192x	Pécs-Baranya		
1929–1930	Vojvodina		

International career
1922	Hungary	1	(0)

Managerial career
- 1929: Empoli
- 1931–1932: Robur Siena
- 193x–193x: Perugia
- 1935–1936: Prato SC
- 1936: Cosenza
- 1936–1937: US Cerignola
- 1937–1939: La Chaux-de-Fonds
- 1939: Colmar
- 1939–1940: Hellas Verona
- 1940–1941: Perugia
- 1943–1944: Belenenses
- 1947–1948: Vitória Setúbal
- 1948–1949: O Elvas CAD
- 1949–1950: Sporting CP
- 1950–1951: Belenenses
- 1951–1952: Vitória Guimarães
- Académica Coimbra
- Estoril-Praia
- Oriental
- SC Braga
- Oliveirense
- Juventude Évora
- * Club domestic league appearances and goals

Sándor Peics (10 October 1899 – 1965), also referred to as Aleksandar Peić or Alexandre Peic, is a former Hungarian footballer and football manager. As a player Peics played for both Újpest FC and Hungary before moving to Italy where he played with Hellas Verona and a spell with Yugoslav side FK Vojvodina in 1929–30.

He coached Prato SC, Cosenza, US Cerignola, FC La Chaux-de-Fonds, Hellas Verona, AC Perugia, Belenenses, Sporting Clube de Portugal, Vitória S.C., and other Portuguese clubs.
