= 1923–24 Campeonato de Portugal =

Tournament details
- Country: Portugal
- Dates: 18 May–8 June 1924
- Teams: 9

Final positions
- Champions: Olhanense (1st title)
- Runners-up: FC Porto

Tournament statistics
- Matches played: 8
- Goals scored: 39 (4.88 per match)

The 1923–24 Campeonato de Portugal was the 3rd edition of Campeonato de Portugal. It was contested by 9 clubs, winners of regional championships, and took place from 18 May to 8 June 1924.

Sporting CP, the defending champions, did not qualify as they finished 2nd on Lisbon FA first division.

The winners were Olhanense, who defeated FC Porto by 4–2 in the final.

== Format ==
The winners of nine regional championships were qualified to this competition: Algarve FA's, Braga FA's, Coimbra FA's, Lisbon FA's, Madeira FA's, Portalegre FA's, Porto FA's, Tomar FA's and Viana do Castelo FA's. This represents an increase in the number of clubs compared to the previous season, where the winners of Portalegre FA, Tomar FA and Viana do Castelo FA did not enter.

All matches are played on a single-leg, with extra time and penalties if necessary. While on the previous edition all matches were played at a neutral venue, in this new format only the final must be played at a neutral venue.

Round	Clubs remaining	Clubs involved	Winners from previous round	New entries this round	Associations entering at this round
First round	9	4	none	4	Algarve FA, Lisbon FA, Portalegre FA, Tomar FA
Second round	7	6	2	4	Braga FA, Coimbra FA, Porto FA, Viana do Castelo FA
Semi-finals	4	4	3	1	Madeira FA
Final	2	2	2	none	none

== Teams ==
- Algarve FA winner: Olhanense
- Braga FA winner: S.C. Braga
- Coimbra FA winner: Académica
- Lisbon FA winner: Vitória de Setúbal
- Madeira FA winner: Marítimo
- Portalegre FA winner: Portalegrense
- Porto FA winner: FC Porto
- Tomar FA winner: Tomar
- Viana do Castelo FA winner: Vianense

== First round ==
18 May 1924	Olhanense	1–0	Vitória de Setúbal	Olhão
				Stadium: Estádio Padinha; Referee: Luís Lucas

18 May 1924	Portalegrense	0–9	Tomar	Portalegre
				Referee: Salvador do Carmo

== Second round ==
18 May 1924	Vianense	2–0	S.C. Braga	Viana do Castelo
				Stadium: Campo de Monserrate; Referee: Sampaio e Castro

18 May 1924	FC Porto	3–2	Académica	Porto
				Stadium: Campo da Constituição; Referee: Cândido Oliveira

25 May 1924	Olhanense	6–0	Tomar	Lisbon
17:30				Stadium: Estádio do Campo Grande; Attendance: 4,000; Referee: Ilídio Nogueira

== Semi-finals ==
25 May 1924	Vianense	1–3	FC Porto	Viana do Castelo
				Stadium: Campo de Monserrate; Referee: Cândido Oliveira

1 June 1924	Olhanense	5–1	Marítimo	Lisbon
				Stadium: Estádio do Campo Grande; Referee: Salvador do Carmo

== Final ==
8 June 1924

Olhanense	4–2	FC Porto
Delfino Graça 3'; Tamanqueiro 40' (pen.); Joaquim Gralho 67'; José Belo 85'		Norman Hall 15'; Tavares Bastos 17' (pen.)

Estádio do Campo Grande, Lisbon
Attendance: 10,000
Referee: Germano Vasconcelos

== Bracket ==
First round
18 May 1924
Olhanense	1
Vitória de Setúbal	0
18 May 1924
Portalegrense	0
Tomar	9

Second round
25 May 1924
Olhanense	6
Tomar	0
18 May 1924
Vianense	2
S.C. Braga	0
18 May 1924
FC Porto	3
Académica	2

Semi-finals
1 June 1924
Olhanense	5
Marítimo	1
25 May 1924
Vianense	1
FC Porto	3

Final
8 June 1924
Olhanense	4
FC Porto	2

== See also ==
- 1924 Campeonato de Portugal Final
