= Cabral Ferreira =

Cabral Ferreira (1951 – 26 February 2008) was the Portuguese President of the C.F. Os Belenenses football club from April 2005 until 2008.

Ferreira died in Lisbon, Portugal, on 26 February 2008, after a long illness at the age of 56. His funeral was held at the Basílica da Estrela in Lisbon and was buried in a cemetery in Lumiar.
