= Alberto Jesus =

Portuguese footballer

Personal information
- Full name: Alberto Ferreira de Jesus
- Date of birth: 26 September 1919
- Place of birth: Portugal
- Position: Forward

Senior career*
Years	Team	Apps	(Gls)
- Belenenses
- Estoril Praia

International career
1948	Portugal	2	(0)
- * Club domestic league appearances and goals

Alberto Ferreira de Jesus (born 26 September 1919, date of death unknown), also known as Ferreirinha, was a Portuguese footballer who played as a forward. He earned two caps for Portugal in 1948, playing against Spain and the Republic of Ireland.
