= César de Matos =

Portuguese footballer

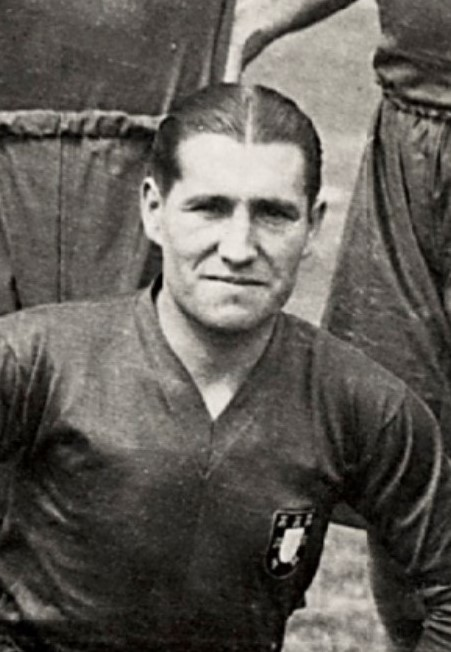
- César de Matos in 1928

Personal information
- Full name: César de Matos Rodrigues
- Date of birth: 22 December 1902
- Place of birth: Campo de Besteiros, Portugal
- Date of death: 14 August 1973 (aged 70)
- Place of death: Lisbon, Portugal
- Position: Midfielder

Senior career*
Years	Team	Apps	(Gls)
1924–1933	Belenenses		

International career
1925–1933	Portugal	17	(0)
- * Club domestic league appearances and goals

César de Matos Rodrigues (22 December 1902 – 14 August 1973) was a Portuguese footballer who played midfielder for Belenenses and the Portugal national team.

== International career ==
Matos had 17 caps for Portugal. Matos made his debut for the national team at 17 May 1925 against Spain in a 0–2 defeat in Lisbon. He participated in the 1928 Football Olympic Tournament and played in all 3 games for Portugal. His last game was at 2 April 1933, in a 0–3 defeat to Spain, in Vigo, aged 31 years old.
