= Feliciano Barbosa =

Portuguese footballer

Personal information
- Place of birth: Portugal
- Date of death: deceased
- Place of death: Portugal
- Position(s): Half-back

Senior career*
Years	Team	Apps	(Gls)
1933–1939	Benfica	15	(3)
- * Club domestic league appearances and goals

Feliciano Barbosa (deceased) is a retired Portuguese footballer who played as a half-back.

He joined Benfica in 1933, but was rarely used in the six years he spent there. He won the league in 1937–38.

== Career ==
Barbosa joined Benfica in 1933 and made his debut on 4 February 1934, against Sporting. It was the only time Ribeiro dos Reis used him that season. In 1934–35, he only competed in the Campeonato de Lisboa and the next two seasons did not play at all. He returned on 7 November 1937 with Beleneses. He did play twice in the Primeira Liga, enough to win him the championship with Benfica.

His breakthrough season was in 1938–39, when he played 28 games in all competitions, scoring four goals, but Benfica failed to win any silverware. He left the club in 1939 with 45 games played and 8 goals scored.

== Honours ==
Benfica

- Primeira Liga: 1937–38
