= 1937–38 Campeonato da Liga =

4th season of top-tier Portuguese football

Primeira Liga
- Season: 1937–38
- Champions: Benfica; 3rd title

The 1937–38 Campeonato da Liga was the fourth season of top-tier football in Portugal. Although the first national competition (in a knock-out cup format) was still called Portuguese Championship, the Primeira Liga winners are considered the national champions.

== Overview ==
It was contested by 8 teams, and S.L. Benfica won the championship.

== League standings ==
| Pos | Team | Pld | W | D | L | GF | GA | GD | Pts |
|---|---|---|---|---|---|---|---|---|---|
| 1 | Benfica (C) | 14 | 10 | 3 | 1 | 34 | 16 | +18 | 23 |
| 2 | Porto | 14 | 11 | 1 | 2 | 43 | 22 | +21 | 23 |
| 3 | Sporting CP | 14 | 10 | 2 | 2 | 67 | 23 | +44 | 22 |
| 4 | Carcavelinhos | 14 | 5 | 1 | 8 | 18 | 36 | −18 | 11 |
| 5 | Belenenses | 14 | 5 | 0 | 9 | 29 | 28 | +1 | 10 |
| 6 | Académica | 14 | 5 | 0 | 9 | 23 | 37 | −14 | 10 |
| 7 | Barreirense | 14 | 2 | 4 | 8 | 18 | 34 | −16 | 8 |
| 8 | Académico | 14 | 2 | 1 | 11 | 15 | 51 | −36 | 5 |

(C) Champions

== Results ==
| Home \ Away | ACA | ACD | BAR | BEL | BEN | CAR | POR | SCP |
|---|---|---|---|---|---|---|---|---|
| Académica | | 5–0 | 1–0 | 2–3 | 1–2 | 1–0 | 1–4 | 0–4 |
| Académico | 1–5 | | 4–1 | 3–2 | 0–4 | 0–4 | 1–4 | 3–6 |
| Barreirense | 1–3 | 1–1 | | 2–1 | 1–2 | 1–2 | 1–4 | 2–2 |
| Belenenses | 5–0 | 1–0 | 2–3 | | 2–1 | 4–0 | 0–1 | 5–6 |
| Benfica | 3–1 | 3–0 | 0–0 | 2–1 | | 3–2 | 3–1 | 3–2 |
| Carcavelinhos | 2–1 | 2–0 | 2–2 | 1–0 | 1–4 | | 0–1 | 1–3 |
| Porto | 5–1 | 7–2 | 3–1 | 5–2 | 2–2 | 3–1 | | 2–1 |
| Sporting CP | 7–1 | 6–0 | 7–2 | 2–1 | 2–2 | 13–0 | 6–1 | |

Legend: Blue = home team win; Yellow = draw; Red = away team win.
