= 1924 Campeonato de Portugal final =

1924 Campeonato de Portugal Final
- Event: 1923–24 Campeonato de Portugal
| Olhanense | FC Porto |
| 4 | 2 |
- Date: June 8, 1924
- Venue: Estádio do Campo Grande, Lisbon
- Referee: Germano Vasconcelos (Braga)
- Attendance: 10,000

The 1924 Campeonato de Portugal Final was the final match of the 1923–24 Campeonato de Portugal, the 3rd season of the Portuguese football cup.

The match took place on Sunday, 8 June 1924, at the Estádio do Campo Grande in Lisbon, between Algarve side Olhanense and Porto side FC Porto. Olhanense won the match 4–2, with goals from Graça, Tamanqueiro, Gralho and Belo. In doing so, Olhanense conquered their 1st title in the competition.

The President of Portugal, Manuel Teixeira Gomes attended the game, starting a tradition in Portugal.

== Road to the final ==
Note: In all results below, the score of the finalist is given first (H: home; A: away; N: neutral).

| Olhanense | | Round | FC Porto | |
| Opponent | Result | Round | Opponent | Result |
|---|---|---|---|---|
| Vitória de Setúbal | 1–0 (H) | First round | | |
| Tomar | 6–0 (N) | Second round | Académica | 3–2 (H) |
| Marítimo | 5–1 (N) | Semi-finals | Vianense | 3–1 (A) |

== Match ==
=== Details ===
8 June 1924

| Olhanense | 4–2 | FC Porto |
|---|---|---|
| Delfino Graça 3'; Tamanqueiro 40' (pen.); Joaquim Gralho 67'; José Belo 85' | | Norman Hall 15'; Tavares Bastos 17' (pen.) |

Estádio do Campo Grande, Lisbon
Attendance: 10,000
Referee: Germano Vasconcelos

| Olhanense | FC Porto |

| GK | (Portugal) Catita |
| DF | (Portugal) Américo Martins |
| MF | (Portugal) Tamanqueiro |
| MF | (Portugal) Falcate |
| MF | (Portugal) Fausto Peres |
| FW | (Portugal) José Belo |
| FW | (Portugal) Joaquim Gralho |
| FW | (Portugal) Francisco Montenegro |
| FW | (Portugal) Júlio Costa (c) |
| FW | (Portugal) Cassiano |
| FW | (Portugal) Delfino Graça |
Manager:
(Portugal) Júlio Costa

| GK | (Portugal) Borges Avelar |
| DF | (Portugal) Álvaro Coelho |
| DF | (Portugal) Alexandre Cal |
| DF | (Portugal) José Bastos |
| MF | (Portugal) Coelho da Costa |
| MF | (Portugal) Artur Freire |
| MF | (Portugal) Velez Carneiro |
| MF | (Portugal) Floreano Pereira (c) |
| FW | (Portugal) João Nunes |
| FW | (Portugal) Augusto Simplício |
| FW | (England) Norman Hall |
Manager:
(Hungary) Akös Teszler

Match rules

- 90 minutes.
- 30 minutes of extra time if necessary.
- Penalty shoot-out if scores still level.
