= António Castela =

Portuguese footballer

Personal information
- Full name: António Augusto Carvalho Castela
- Date of birth: 26 October 1928 (age 97)
- Place of birth: Portugal
- Position: Midfielder

Senior career*
Years	Team	Apps	(Gls)
1951–1955	Belenenses		

International career
1952–1954	Portugal	4	(0)
- * Club domestic league appearances and goals

António Augusto Carvalho Castela (born 26 October 1928) is a former Portuguese footballer who played as midfielder.

== Football career ==
Castela gained 4 caps for Portugal and made his debut 23 November 1952 in Porto against Austria, in a 1–1 draw.
