= Serafim Neves =

Portuguese footballer

- Neves (center)

Personal information
- Full name: Serafim das Neves
- Date of birth: 29 August 1920
- Place of birth: Terras de Basto
- Position: Defender

Senior career*
Years	Team	Apps	(Gls)
1940–1954	Belenenses		

International career
1945–1953	Portugal	18	(0)
- * Club domestic league appearances and goals

Serafim das Neves (29 August 1920 – 1989), was a Portuguese footballer who played as a defender.

== Club career ==
Neves spent his entire career at Belenenses, where he won the Taça de Portugal in 1942, and the Primeira Divisão in 1947.

== International career ==
Neves represented Portugal national team eighteen times and made his debut against Spain in Lisbon on 13 March 1945, in a 2–2 draw.

== Honours ==
=== Club ===
Belenenses

- Primeira Divisão: 1945–46
- Taça de Portugal: 1941–42
