= José Sério =

Portuguese footballer

Personal information
- Full name: José Carvalho Sério
- Date of birth: 5 March 1922
- Place of birth: Lisbon, Portugal
- Date of death: 3 December 2010 (aged 88)
- Position: Goalkeeper

Senior career*
Years	Team	Apps	(Gls)
1947–49	Belenenses		

International career
1948	Portugal	1	(0)
- * Club domestic league appearances and goals

José Carvalho Sério (born 5 March 1922 – 3 December 2010) was a Portuguese footballer who played as goalkeeper. He was born in Lisbon, Portugal.

== Football career ==
Sério gained 1 cap for Portugal against Spain 21 March 1948 in Madrid, in a 0–2 defeat.
