= Artur Quaresma =

Portuguese footballer

Personal information
- Full name: Artur da Silva Quaresma
- Date of birth: 27 June 1917
- Place of birth: Barreiro, Portugal
- Date of death: 2 December 2011 (aged 94)
- Place of death: Barreiro, Portugal
- Position: Forward

Youth career
- Nacional Barreiro
- Sport Lisboa e Barreiro
- 1933–1935: Barreirense

Senior career*
Years	Team	Apps	(Gls)
1935–1936	Barreirense		
1936–1948	Belenenses	171	(75)
1949–1950	Elvas	4	(1)
Total		175	(76)

International career
1937–1946	Portugal	5	(0)

Managerial career
- 1948–1949: Belenenses
- 1968–1969: Braga
- 1976–1978: Rio Ave
- * Club domestic league appearances and goals

Artur da Silva Quaresma (27 June 1917 – 2 December 2011) was a Portuguese footballer who played as a forward.

== Club career ==
Born in Barreiro, Setúbal District, Quaresma started playing with local F.C. Barreirense in the Segunda Liga. In the summer of 1936 he moved to the Primeira Liga with C.F. Os Belenenses, where he would remain for the following 13 seasons, working as an electrician after training.

In 1945–46, as the Lisbon-based team won the only national championship of their history, Quaresma scored 14 goals in 22 matches. He retired on 5 October 1948 aged only 30 following a game against neighbouring Sporting CP (4–1 home win, two goals), then acted as his main club's coach during the same campaign, leading it to the third position. He worked with the youth sides in the following years.

== International career ==
Quaresma earned five caps for Portugal, appearing in as many friendlies in eight years. He made his debut on 28 November 1937, against Spain (2–1 win in Vigo); before that match he, alongside teammates Mariano Amaro, João Azevedo and José Simões, refused to perform the fascist salute, being subsequently questioned by PIDE.

== Personal life and death ==
Quaresma died in his hometown of Barreiro on 2 December 2011, at the age of 94. Many media outlets referred to him as being the great-uncle of another footballer, Ricardo Quaresma, who played with individual and team success for FC Porto and was also an international; the latter later denied this, however, but referred to the former as an "inspiration to overcome adversity in life".

== Honours ==
Belenenses

- Primeira Liga: 1945–46
- Taça de Portugal: 1941–42; runner-up: 1939–40, 1940–41, 1947–48
