= Vasco Oliveira (footballer, born 1922) =

Portuguese footballer

Personal information
- Full name: Vasco de Jesus Oliveira
- Date of birth: 18 March 1922
- Place of birth: Portugal
- Date of death: Deceased
- Position: Defender

Senior career*
Years	Team	Apps	(Gls)
1946–1949	Belenenses		

International career
1947–1948	Portugal	2	(0)
- * Club domestic league appearances and goals

Vasco de Jesus Oliveira (18 March 1922 – deceased) was a Portuguese footballer who played as defender.

== Football career ==
Oliveira gained 2 caps for Portugal and made his debut 25 May 1947 in Lisbon against England, in a 0–10 defeat.
