= Alberto Gomes =

Portuguese footballer

Personal information
- Full name: Alberto Luis Gomes
- Date of birth: 29 December 1915
- Place of birth: Monção, Portugal
- Date of death: 16 February 1992 (aged 76)

Senior career*
Years	Team	Apps	(Gls)
1934–1949	Académica		

International career
1940–1942	Portugal	2	(1)

Managerial career
- 1961–1962: Académica
- * Club domestic league appearances and goals

Alberto Luis Gomes (29 December 1915 – 16 February 1992) was a Portuguese footballer who played as forward.

== Football career ==
Gomes gained 2 caps and scored 1 goal for Portugal. He made his debut 28 January 1940 in Paris against France, in a 2-3 defeat.
