= José Simões =

Portuguese footballer

Personal information
- Full name: José Ribeiro Simões Costa
- Date of birth: 15 June 1913
- Place of birth: Portugal
- Date of death: 19 July 1944 (aged 31)
- Place of death: Portugal
- Position: Right-back

Youth career
- Belenenses

Senior career*
Years	Team	Apps	(Gls)
1934–1944	Belenenses	135	(2)

International career
1936–1941	Portugal	10	(0)
- * Club domestic league appearances and goals

José Ribeiro Simões Costa (15 June 1913 – 19 July 1944), known as Simões, was a Portuguese footballer who played as a right-back.

== Club career ==
Simões spent his entire career with C.F. Os Belenenses, always in the Primeira Liga. He was part of the squad that won the 1941–42 Taça de Portugal.

Simões died on 19 July 1944, aged 31.

== International career ==
Simões won 10 caps for Portugal over five years. He made his debut on 26 January 1936, in a 3–2 friendly defeat against Austria held in Porto.

On 28 November 1937, before the start of another exhibition game, against Spain in Vigo, Simões, as well as teammates Mariano Amaro, João Azevedo and Artur Quaresma, refused to perform the fascist salute, being subsequently questioned by PIDE.

== See also ==
- List of one-club men
