= Tamanqueiro (Portuguese footballer) =

Portuguese footballer

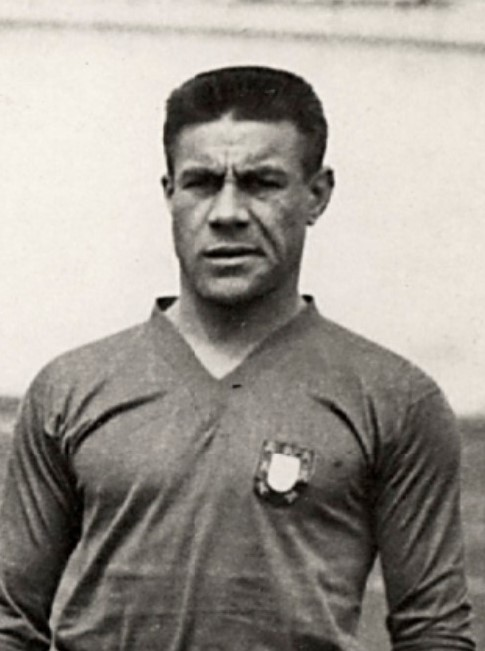
- Tamanqueiro in 1928

Personal information
- Full name: Raul Soares de Figueiredo
- Date of birth: 22 January 1903
- Place of birth: Lisbon, Portugal
- Date of death: 3 December 1941 (aged 38)
- Position: Midfielder

Senior career*
Years	Team	Apps	(Gls)
?–1924	Académico Porto		
1924–1927	Olhanense		
1927–1931	Benfica		

International career
1925–1930	Portugal	17	(0)
- * Club domestic league appearances and goals

Raul Soares de Figueiredo (22 January 1903 – 3 December 1941), known as Tamanqueiro, was Portuguese footballer who played as a midfielder.

== Football career ==
During his short senior career, Tamanqueiro played for Académico do Porto, S.C. Olhanense and S.L. Benfica. He gained 17 caps for the Portugal national team.

Having made his debut on 17 May 1925, in a 0–2 defeat against Spain in Lisbon, Tamanqueiro appeared for the nation at the 1928 Summer Olympics.
