= 1925–26 Campeonato de Portugal =

Tournament details
- Country: Portugal
- Dates: 9 May 1926 – 6 June 1926
- Teams: 12

Final positions
- Champions: Marítimo (1st title)
- Runners-up: Belenenses

Tournament statistics
- Matches played: 11
- Goals scored: 47 (4.27 per match)
- Top goal scorer(s): Hall (10 goals)

The 1925–26 Campeonato de Portugal was the 5th edition of the Portuguese football knockout tournament, organized by the Portuguese Football Federation (FPF). The 1925–26 Campeonato de Portugal began on the 9 May 1926. The final was played on the 6 June 1926 at the Campo do Ameal.

Porto were the previous holders, having defeated Sporting 2–1 in the previous season's final. Marítimo defeated Belenenses, 2–0 in the final to win their first Campeonato de Portugal.

== Semi-finals ==
Ties were played on the 23 May.

23 May 1926	Marítimo	7–1	Porto	Estádio do Campo Grande, Lisbon
	António Alves (4); Manuel Ramos (2); António Camarão (1)		Hall (1)	Referee: Ilídio Nogueira

23 May 1926	Belenenses	2–1	Olhanense	Campo do Ameal, Porto
	Alfredo Ramos; Severo Tiago		Eduardo Azevedo (o.g.)	Referee: José Mota

== Final ==
6 June 1926

Belenenses	0–2	Marítimo
		José Fernandes 55'; Manuel Ramos 70'

Campo do Ameal, Porto
Referee: José Guimarães (Porto)
