= 1945–46 Taça de Portugal =

Tournament details
- Country: Portugal
- Teams: 16

Final positions
- Champions: Sporting Clube de Portugal
- Runners-up: Atlético Clube de Portugal

Tournament statistics
- Matches played: 14

The 1945–46 Taça de Portugal was the eighth season of the Taça de Portugal (English: Portuguese Cup), the premier Portuguese football knockout competition, organized by the Portuguese Football Federation (FPF). Sporting Clube de Portugal was the defending champion and played Atlético Clube de Portugal in the final on 30 June 1946, in Lisbon.

== Participating teams ==
=== Primeira Divisão ===
(12 Teams)

- Associação Académica de Coimbra – Organismo Autónomo de Futebol
- Atlético Clube de Portugal
- Clube de Futebol Os Belenenses
- Sport Lisboa e Benfica
- Boavista Futebol Clube
- Sport Lisboa e Elvas
- Sporting Clube Olhanense
- União Desportiva Oliveirense
- Futebol Clube do Porto
- Sporting Clube de Portugal
- Vitória Sport Clube "de Guimarães"
- Vitória Futebol Clube "de Setúbal"

=== Segunda Divisão ===
(4 Teams)

- Grupo Desportivo Estoril Praia
- Futebol Clube Famalicão
- Portimonense Sporting Clube
- Clube de Futebol União de Coimbra

== First round ==
=== Results ===
Atlético CP (1D)	2 – 1	Estoril Praia (2D)

Benfica (1D)	3 – 0	Belenenses (1D)

Boavista (1D)	3 – 2	União de Coimbra (2D)

SL Elvas (1D)	5 – 1	Oliveirense (1D)

Famalicão (2D)	3 – 2	Olhanense (1D)

Porto (1D)	7 – 1	Vitória de Setúbal (1D)

Sporting CP (1D)	6 – 3	Académica de Coimbra (1D)

Vitória de Guimarães (1D)	2 – 1	Portimonense (2D)

== Quarterfinals ==
=== Results ===
Atlético CP (1D)	3 – 2	Benfica (1D)

Famalicão (2D)	4 – 3	SL Elvas (1D)

Porto (1D)	3 – 0	Boavista (1D)

Sporting CP (1D)	5 – 1	Vitória de Guimarães (1D)

== Semifinals ==
=== Results ===
Atlético CP (1D)	2 – 1	Porto (1D)

Sporting CP (1D)	11 – 0	Famalicão (2D)

== Final ==
30 June 1946

Sporting CP	4 – 2	Atlético CP

Estádio Nacional, Jamor
