= João Jurado =

Portuguese footballer

Jurado
Personal information
- Full name: João de Almeida Jurado
- Date of birth: 18 May 1906
- Place of birth: Cacilhas, Portugal
- Position: Central defender

Senior career*
Years	Team	Apps	(Gls)
- Sporting

International career
1933–1935	Portugal	4	(0)
- * Club domestic league appearances and goals

João de Almeida Jurado (born 18 May 1906 in Cacilhas, Portugal - date of death unknown) was a Portuguese footballer who played for Sporting and the Portugal national team, as central defender.

== International career ==
Jurado gained 4 caps and made his national team debut 2 April 1933, against Spain in Vigo, in a 0-3 defeat
