= Serra e Moura =

Portuguese footballer

Personal information
- Full name: Francisco José de Serra e Moura
- Date of birth: 3 June 1898
- Place of birth: Lisbon, Portugal
- Position: Midfielder

Senior career*
Years	Team	Apps	(Gls)
- Sporting CP

International career
1928–1930	Portugal	3	(0)
- * Club domestic league appearances and goals

Francisco José de Serra e Moura (born 3 June 1898, date of death unknown) was a Portuguese footballer who played as a midfielder. He was part of Portugal's squad for the 1928 Summer Olympics, but he did not play in any matches.
