= Rogério Sousa =

Portuguese footballer

Personal information
- Full name: Rogério Apolónio de Sousa
- Date of birth: April 18, 1910
- Place of birth: Funchal, Portugal
- Date of death: 1976 (age 65-66)
- Place of death: Lisbon, Portugal
- Height: 1.75 m (5 ft 9 in)
- Position: Outside forward

Senior career*
| Years | Team | Apps | (Gls) |
| 1932−1940 | Benfica | 68 | (46) |
| Total | | 68 | (46) |
- * Club domestic league appearances and goals

Rogério Apolónio de Sousa (18 April 1910 – 1976) was a Portuguese footballer who played as an outside forward.

== Club career ==
Born in Funchal, Madeira, during the time of the constitutional monarchy, which would last a further six months. In his youth he started to play football with a leather ball in the extreme poverty of Madeira.

He joined Benfica in 1932, where he would play as outside forward in a typical 2–3–2–3 formation supporting Vítor Silva, Valadas or Espírito Santo. In his first season, he helped the club stop a 12-year winless run in the Campeonato de Lisboa.

In 1936–37 Primeira Liga, he was the team topscorer with 19 league goals, 32 in all competitions, as Benfica conquer their second league title. His last game for Benfica was a 2–1 win over Carcavelinhos on 16 June 1940.

== Honours ==
Benfica

- Primeira Divisão (6)
- Taça de Portugal (2)
- Campeonato de Portugal (1)
- Campeonato de Lisboa (1)
