= Mariano Amaro =

Portuguese footballer

Personal information
- Full name: Mariano Rodrigues Amaro
- Date of birth: 7 August 1914
- Place of birth: Lisbon, Portugal
- Date of death: 22 May 1987 (aged 72)
- Place of death: Portugal
- Position: Midfielder

Youth career
- Sport Adicense

Senior career*
Years	Team	Apps	(Gls)
1934–1948	Belenenses	213	(3)

International career
1937–1947	Portugal	19	(0)
- * Club domestic league appearances and goals

Mariano Rodrigues Amaro (7 August 1914 – 22 May 1987) was a Portuguese football midfielder and manager.

== Club career ==
Amaro was born in Lisbon. He spent his entire career with local club C.F. Os Belenenses, always in the Primeira Liga.

In the 1945–46 season, captain Amaro contributed 22 appearances as the team won the national championship for the first and only time in their history.

== International career ==
Amaro earned the first of his 19 caps for Portugal on 28 November 1937, in a 2–1 friendly win against Spain in Vigo. Before that match he, alongside teammates João Azevedo, Artur Quaresma and José Simões, refused to perform the fascist salute, being subsequently questioned by PIDE.

== See also ==
- List of one-club men
