= Octávio Barrosa =

Portuguese footballer

Personal information
- Full name: Octávio dos Santos Barrosa
- Date of birth: 21 December 1920
- Place of birth: Lisbon, Portugal
- Date of death: 21 February 2001 (aged 80)
- Position: Defender

Youth career
- 1937–1939: Sporting CP

Senior career*
Years	Team	Apps	(Gls)
1939–1950	Sporting CP		

International career
1945–1950	Portugal	7	(0)
- * Club domestic league appearances and goals

Octávio dos Santos Barrosa (21 December 1920 – 21 February 2001) was a Portuguese footballer who played as defender.
