= Abrantes Mendes =

Portuguese footballer

Personal information
- Full name: António Abrantes Mendes
- Date of birth: 2 May 1907
- Place of birth: Lisbon, Portugal
- Date of death: 25 January 1988 (aged 80)
- Position: Forward

Senior career*
Years	Team	Apps	(Gls)
1925–1939	Sporting CP		

International career
1930	Portugal	2	(0)
- * Club domestic league appearances and goals

António Abrantes Mendes (2 May 1907, in Lisbon – 25 January 1988, in Lisbon) was a Portuguese footballer who played as a forward.
