= 1947–48 Taça de Portugal =

Tournament details
- Country: Portugal
- Teams: 29

Final positions
- Champions: Sporting Clube de Portugal
- Runners-up: C.F. Os Belenenses

Tournament statistics
- Matches played: 29

The 1947–48 Taça de Portugal was the ninth season of the Taça de Portugal (English: Portuguese Cup), the premier Portuguese football knockout competition, organized by the Portuguese Football Federation (FPF). The competition wansn't played in the previous season due to overscheduling with the creation of the Terceira Divisão. Sporting Clube de Portugal defeated C.F. Os Belenenses in the final on 4 July 1948.

== Participating teams ==
=== Primeira Divisão ===
(14 Teams)

- Associação Académica de Coimbra – Organismo Autónomo de Futebol
- Atlético Clube de Portugal
- Clube de Futebol Os Belenenses
- Sport Lisboa e Benfica
- Sporting Clube de Braga
- Boavista Futebol Clube
- Grupo Desportivo Estoril Praia
- Lusitano Futebol Clube "VRSA"
- O Elvas Clube Alentejano de Desportos
- Sporting Clube Olhanense
- Futebol Clube do Porto
- Sporting Clube de Portugal
- Vitória Sport Clube "de Guimarães"
- Vitória Futebol Clube "de Setúbal"

=== Segunda Divisão ===
(10 Teams)

- Futebol Clube Barreirense
- Grupo Desportivo CUF "Barreiro"
- Futebol Clube Famalicão
- Leixões Sport Clube
- Sport Grupo Scalabitano Os Leões "de Santarém"
- Luso Sport Clube "Beja"
- União Desportiva Oliveirense
- Portimonense Sporting Clube
- Sporting Clube da Covilhã
- Clube de Futebol União de Coimbra

=== Terceira Divisão ===
(4 Teams)

- Clube Académico de Futebol "de Viseu"
- Clube Desportivo Cova da Piedade
- Clube Desportivo de Faro
- Sport Clube União Torreense

=== Madeira Championship ===
(1 Team)

- Clube Sport Marítimo

== First round ==
=== Results ===
Académica de Coimbra (1D)	4 – 1	Boavista (1D)

Atlético CP (1D)	4 – 2	Sporting da Covilhã (2D)

Vitória de Setúbal (1D)	0 – 0	Barreirense (2D)

Belenenses (1D)	3 – 1	Leixões (2D)

Cova da Piedade (3D)	0 – 0	Torreense (3D)

CUF Barreiro (2D)	4 – 2	Clube Académico de Futebol (3D)

O Elvas (1D)	13 – 0	Faro (3D)

Estoril Praia (1D)	1 – 0	Lusitano VRSA (1D)

Oliveirense (2D)	3 – 1	Famalicão (2D)

Portimonense (2D)	4 – 1	Luso Beja (2D)

Braga (1D)	3 – 2	Leões de Santarém (2D)

Benfica (1D)	5 – 2	Olhanense (1D)

Porto (1D)	9 – 0	União de Coimbra (2D)

Sporting CP (1D)	5 – 1	Vitória de Guimarães (1D)

== First-round play-off ==
=== Results ===
Barreirense (2D)	1 – 0	Vitória de Setúbal (1D)

Torreense (3D)	? – ?	Cova da Piedade (3D)

== Second round ==
=== Results ===
Atlético CP (1D)	3 – 0	Cova da Piedade (3D)

Belenenses (1D)	1 – 0	CUF Barreiro (2D)

Oliveirense (2D)	2 – 1	Académica de Coimbra (1D)

Portimonense (2D)	3 – 0	Braga (1D)

Barreirense (2D)	1 – 0	Porto (1D)

Benfica (1D)	6 – 1	O Elvas (1D)

Sporting CP (1D)	6 – 2	Estoril Praia (1D)

== Quarterfinals ==
=== Results ===
Barreirense (2D)	2 – 0	Marítimo (MC)

Belenenses (1D)	8 – 1	Oliveirense (2D)

Benfica (1D)	2 – 1	Atlético CP (1D)

Sporting CP (1D)	6 – 1	Portimonense (2D)

== Semifinals ==
=== Results ===
Belenenses (1D)	5 – 1	Barreirense (2D)

Sporting CP (1D)	3 – 0	Benfica (1D)

== Final ==
4 July 1948

Sporting CP	3 – 1	Belenenses

Estádio Nacional, Jamor
