= Manuel Rodrigues (footballer, born 1905) =

Portuguese footballer

Personal information
- Date of birth: 16 March 1905
- Place of birth: Portugal
- Date of death: Deceased
- Position: Forward

Senior career*
Years	Team	Apps	(Gls)
- Carcavelinhos

International career
1925	Portugal	1	(0)
- * Club domestic league appearances and goals

Manuel Rodrigues (born 16 March 1905 – deceased) was a Portuguese footballer who played as a forward.
