= António Feliciano =

Portuguese footballer

Personal information
- Date of birth: 19 January 1922
- Place of birth: Covilhã, Portugal
- Date of death: 14 December 2010 (aged 88)
- Place of death: Ourense, Spain
- Position: Defender

Senior career*
Years	Team	Apps	(Gls)
1944–1950	Belenenses		

International career
1945–1949	Portugal	14	(0)

Managerial career
- 1972: Porto
- 1973: Porto
- * Club domestic league appearances and goals

António Feliciano (19 January 1922 in Covilhã – 14 December 2010 in Ourense, Spain) former Portuguese footballer who played for Belenenses, as a defender.

== International career ==
Feliciano made his debut for Portugal against Spain 6 May 1945 in A Coruña, in a 2-4 defeat. Feliciano gained 14 caps.
