= Lippo Hertzka =

Hungarian football player and manager

Personal information
- Date of birth: 19 November 1904
- Place of birth: Budapest, Kingdom of Hungary
- Date of death: 14 March 1951 (aged 46)
- Place of death: Montemor-o-Novo, Portugal
- Position: Striker

Senior career*
Years	Team	Apps	(Gls)
1919–1920	MTK	3	
- Essener Turnerbund
- Real Sociedad

Managerial career
- 1923–1926: Real Sociedad
- 1926–1928: Athletic Bilbao
- 1927–1930: Sevilla
- 1930–1932: Real Madrid
- 1932–1934: Hércules
- 1934–1935: Granada
- 1936–1939: Benfica
- 1939–1940: Belenenses
- 1940–1941: Académica
- 1942–1945: Porto
- 1946–1947: Estoril
- 1947–1948: Benfica
- * Club domestic league appearances and goals

Lippo Hertzka (Hungarian: Hertzka Lipót, 19 November 1904 – 14 March 1951) was a Hungarian football player and manager of Jewish descent. He played for Essener Turnerbund, MTK Budapest and Real Sociedad. After retiring, he coached seven teams, including Real Sociedad and Real Madrid, a team which he coached for 2 years (1930–1932) and led to an undefeated La Liga championship during the 1931–32 season, which meant the first La Liga title for the white squad. He also won two league titles in Portugal for Benfica.

He coached Real Sociedad, Athletic Bilbao, Sevilla, Real Madrid, Hércules, Granada, Benfica, Belenenses, Porto, Estoril, Académica, Vila Real, Portimonense and União Montemor.
