= João Azevedo (footballer) =

Portuguese footballer

João Mendonça Azevedo (10 July 1915 – 3 January 1991) was a Portuguese footballer who played as a goalkeeper.

His career was all but associated with Sporting CP, for which he appeared in 423 competitive games.

== Club career ==
Born in Barreiro, Setúbal District, Azevedo started playing football with two local teams, F.C. Barreirense and Luso Futebol Clube. He signed for Sporting CP in 1935, going on to remain with the club the following 18 seasons and win 14 major titles, including eight Primeira Liga championships.

On 17 November 1946, in a game against S.L. Benfica for the Lisbon Championship, Azevedo broke an arm, had to leave the field but returned during the second half with the score at 1–1 to help secure a 3–1 win. He retired in 1954 at 39, after a season with neighbouring Clube Oriental de Lisboa.

== International career ==
Azevedo earned 19 caps for the Portugal national team in one decade, making his debut on 28 November 1937 in a 2–1 friendly win over Spain. Before that match he, alongside teammates Mariano Amaro, Artur Quaresma and José Simões, refused to perform the fascist salute, being subsequently questioned by PIDE.

Azevedo's only competitive appearance took place on 1 May 1938, where a 1–0 defeat against Switzerland in Italy meant failure to qualify for that year's FIFA World Cup. He was also in goal for his country on 25 May 1947, in the 10–0 friendly loss with England in Oeiras.

== Later life and death ==
After finishing his career, Azevedo worked as a taxi driver. He later moved to London, England, where he worked as a college chauffeur.

Azevedo returned to Portugal in 1982, dying in his hometown on 4 January 1991 at the age of 75.

== Honours ==
Sporting CP

- Primeira Liga: 1940–41, 1943–44, 1946–47, 1947–48, 1948–49, 1950–51, 1951–52, 1952–53
- Taça de Portugal: 1940–41, 1944–45, 1945–46, 1947–48
- Campeonato de Portugal: 1935–36, 1937–38
