= Académico F.C. =

Portuguese football club

Académico do Porto
- Full name: Académico Futebol Clube
- Founded: 15 September 1911
- Ground: Paranhos, Porto
- Chairman: José Pedro Sarmento
- Website: http://www.academicofc.pt/
Home colours	Away colours

Académico Futebol Clube, or more commonly known as Académico do Porto, was a Portuguese football club from Paranhos, Porto. The club was founded on 15 September 1911. Académico was one of the eight teams taking part in the first Primeira Liga season, the main division in the Portuguese football league system, in the 1934–35 season. They went to play in the league an additional four times. Later Académico lost its ground and ended the professional football team.

Instead of favouring the return of the football team, they invested in other sports, namely in basketball, roller hockey and team handball, a policy that still remains. As a sports club, Académico has won over one hundred different trophies in the respective sports it competes in.

== Honours ==
- Campeonato do Porto: 1
  - 1941–42
