= Campo das Salésias =

Multi-use stadium in Lisbon, Portugal

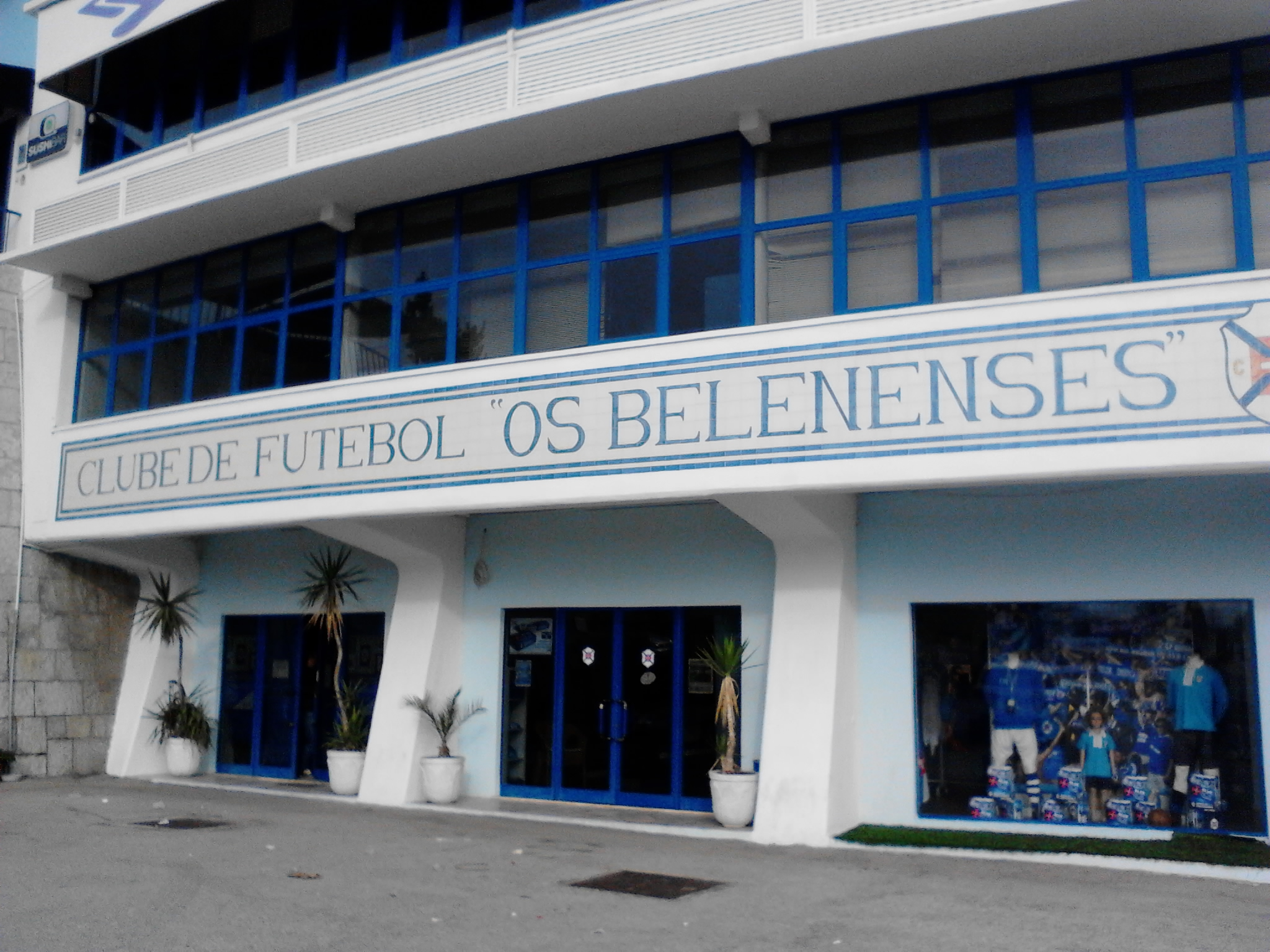
- Interactive map of Campo das Salésias
- Full name: Campo das Salésias
- Location: Lisbon, Portugal
- Owner: C.F. Os Belenenses
- Operator: C.F. Os Belenenses
- Capacity: 21,000

Construction
- Opened: January 29, 1928
- Closed: 1956

Tenant
- C.F. Os Belenenses

Campo das Salésias, also known as Estádio José Manuel Soares, was a multi-use stadium in Lisbon, Portugal. It was initially used as the stadium of C.F. Os Belenenses matches. It was replaced by the current Estádio do Restelo in 1956. The capacity of the stadium was 21,000 spectators. It was named after José Manuel Soares, who played for Belenenses. It was the first turf field in Portugal and one of the firsts having artificial lighting.

Nowadays, Belenenses are rebuilding the stadium to turn it into a field to the youngest players of club.

== Portugal national team matches ==
The following national team matches were held in the stadium.

#	Date	Score	Opponent	Competition
1.	9 January 1938	4–0	Hungary	Friendly
2.	30 January 1938	1–0	Spain	Friendly
3.	12 February 1939	2–4	Switzerland	Friendly
4.	12 January 1941	2–2	Spain	Friendly
5.	1 January 1942	3–0	Switzerland	Friendly
