= Taça de Portugal =

- Founded: 1938 (1922, as Campeonato de Portugal)
- Region: Portugal
- Teams: 155 (current season)
- Qualifier for: UEFA Europa League
- Domestic cup: Supertaça Cândido de Oliveira
- Current champions: Torreense (1st title)
- Most championships: Benfica (26 titles)
- Broadcaster(s): RTP1; SportTV; Canal 11
- Website: fpf.pt/taca-de-portugal
- 2026–27 Taça de Portugal

The Taça de Portugal (Portuguese pronunciation: [ˈtasɐ ðɨ puɾtuˈɣal]; lit. 'Cup of Portugal') is an annual association football competition and the premier knockout tournament in Portuguese football. For sponsorship reasons, it has been known as Taça de Portugal Generali Tranquilidade since the 2024–25 season. Organised by the Portuguese Football Federation since it was first held in 1938, the competition is open to professional and amateur clubs from the top-four league divisions. Matches are played from August–September to May–June, and the final is traditionally held at the Estádio Nacional in Oeiras, near Lisbon.

The cup winners qualify for the Supertaça Cândido de Oliveira (or the runners-up, in case the winners are also the league champions) and the UEFA Europa League. The Europa League berth is passed down the contemporaneous Primeira Liga table if the cup winner had already qualified for the UEFA Champions League.

Before 1938, a similar competition was held since 1922 under the name Campeonato de Portugal (English: Championship of Portugal), which determined the national champions from among the different regional championship winners. The establishment of the Primeira Liga, a nationwide league-based competition, as the official domestic championship in 1938, led to the conversion of the Campeonato de Portugal into the main domestic cup competition, under its current designation. The trophy awarded to the Portuguese Cup winners is the same that was awarded to the Campeonato de Portugal winners, although titles in each competition are counted separately.

The first winners of the Taça de Portugal were Académica, who defeated Benfica 4–3 in the 1939 final. Benfica are the most successful team in the competition, with 26 trophies in 39 final appearances. Torreense are the current holders, after beating Sporting CP 2–1 in the 2026 final to secure their first title in the competition.

== History ==
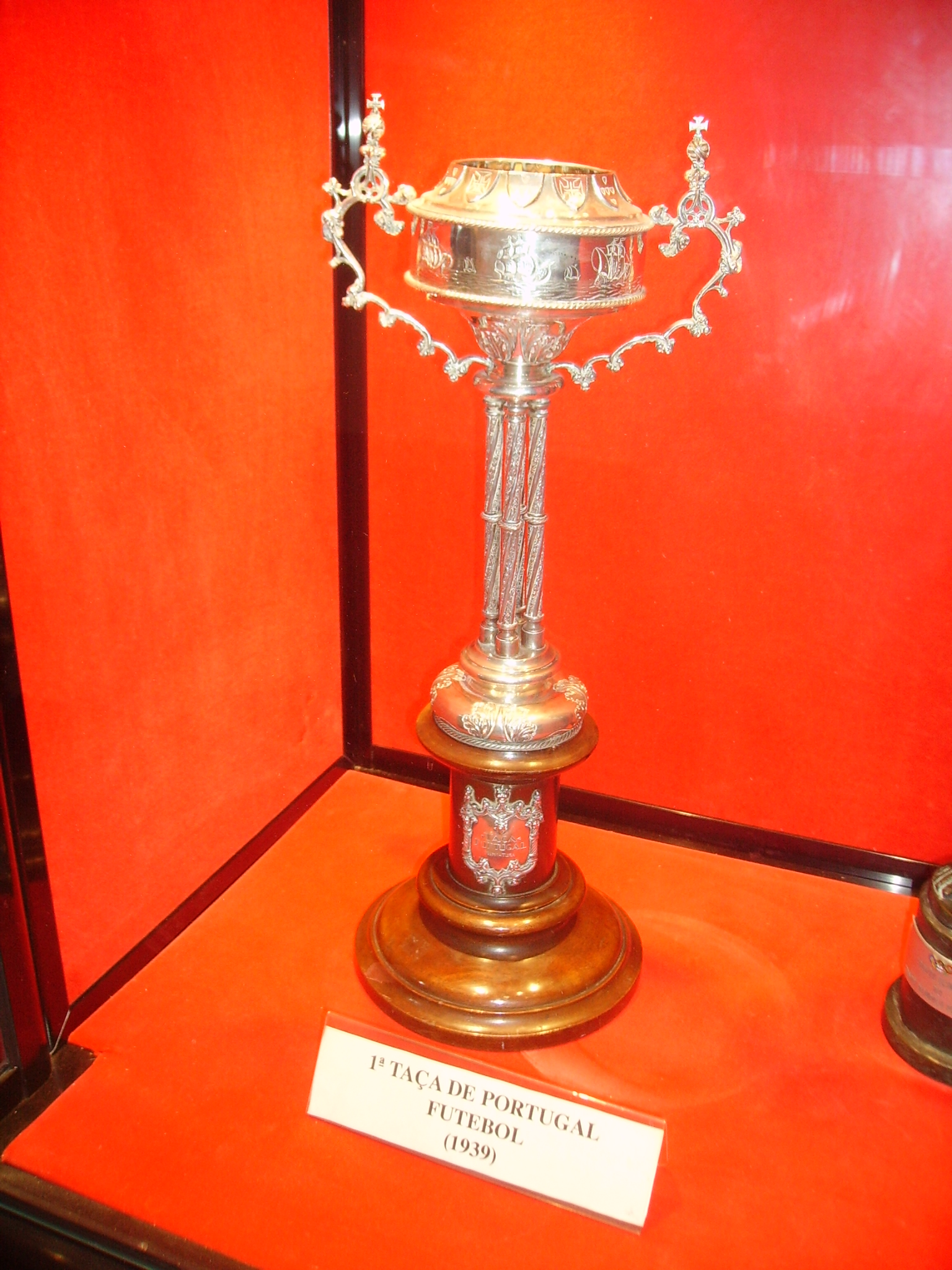
Replica of the Taça de Portugal trophy first awarded to Académica de Coimbra in 1939.

The first incarnation of a Portuguese Cup began in 1912, as an invitational tournament organized by SC Império; it was named after the organizing club, as "Taça do Império" (not to be confused with a similarly named, but unrelated, Taça Império - the one-off trophy for the inaugural match at the National Stadium on 10 June 1944). Because of its closed format, with very few clubs taking part, the Portuguese Federation does not recognise it as a true "national cup"; it ended in 1918.

The inaugural season of the "Campeonato de Portugal" (Championship of Portugal) took place in 1921–22, and this competition was played every season until 1937–38. The original format had all the clubs participating in regional leagues, with the regional winners progressing to knock-out rounds, and the ultimate victors named Champions of Portugal. This was the primary tournament in Portugal, until the creation of the round-robin competition in 1934-35 - in fact, the Champions moniker of this early period can be misleading, as the modern concept of "champion" applies to the league champion (i.e., for statistical purposes, the winners of this Campeonato de Portugal are no longer counted among Portuguese League champions). The short period of coexistence between two championships meant considerable confusion, and was pointed as a reason for lack of competitiveness in contemporary international matches - therefore, a revamp was bound to happen.

The success of the older competition meant it was carried over after the reorganization of Football competitions in 1938–39, albeit losing its top status: the (round-robin) league carried the name Campeonato (or, in its longform, "Campeonato Nacional da Primeira Divisão"), and the old Campeonato de Portugal was renamed "Taça de Portugal" (Portuguese Cup) for the 1938–39 season. The Cup soon became the second-most important trophy in Portuguese football.

The Cup is organised by the Portuguese Football Federation (Federação Portuguesa de Futebol) and is played by all teams in the Primeira Liga, Segunda Liga, Liga 3 and Campeonato de Portugal, by the 20 District Championship runners-up and by the 20 District Cup winners. Some extra teams from the District Championships might be invited in order to fill necessary spots. Reserve teams aren't allowed to enter the competition.

=== Format ===
As of the 2023–24 season, the cup is composed of 8 rounds (final included), with 1st level clubs joining at the 3rd round, the 2nd level clubs joining at the 2nd round and the 3rd and lower-level clubs competing from the beginning. All rounds are played in a single game, except for the semifinals, which are played over two legs (home and away).

=== Final venues ===
The final match has been played at the Estádio Nacional near Lisbon in Jamor every season since 1946, except in 1961 (in a rare occurrence, Estádio das Antas was chosen as a more convenient venue for both Leixões and FC Porto, despite being the home of the latter; an agreement was reached by both teams due to geographical proximity and capacity); in the three years following the Carnation Revolution; in the 1982–83 season, due to FC Porto's pressure. In the years following the Carnation Revolution, the venue for the final match would be the home ground of the team that had won the Portuguese Cup the previous year; however, when Boavista won the Cup twice in a row, its home ground (Estádio do Bessa) was deemed too small and the matches were instead played in Estádio das Antas (FC Porto's former home ground).

== Finals ==
=== Campeonato de Portugal (1922–1938) ===
Campeonato de Portugal finals
Season	Winners	Result	Runners-up	Date	Venue
1922	Porto	2–1	Sporting CP	4 June 1922	Campo da Constituição, Porto
1922	Porto	0–2	Sporting CP	11 June 1922	Campo Grande, Lisbon
1922	Porto	3–1 (a.e.t.)	Sporting CP	18 June 1922	Campo do Bessa, Porto
1922–23	Sporting CP	3–0	Académica	24 June 1923	Santo Estádio, Faro
1923–24	Olhanense	4–2	Porto	8 June 1924	Campo Grande, Lisbon
1924–25	Porto (2)	2–1	Sporting CP	28 June 1925	Campo de Monserrate, Viana do Castelo
1925–26	Marítimo	2–0 (Note: Belenenses walked off on the 50th minute to protest the officiating.)	Belenenses	6 June 1926	Campo do Ameal, Porto
1926–27	Belenenses	3–0	Vitória de Setúbal	12 June 1927	Estádio do Lumiar, Lisbon
1927–28	Carcavelinhos	3–1	Sporting CP	30 June 1928	Campo de Palhavã, Lisbon
1928–29	Belenenses (2)	2–1	União de Lisboa	16 June 1929	Campo de Palhavã, Lisbon
1929–30	Benfica	3–1 (a.e.t.)	Barreirense	1 June 1930	Campo Grande, Lisbon
1930–31	Benfica (2)	3–0	Porto	28 June 1931	Campo do Arnado, Coimbra
1931–32	Porto (3)	4–4 (a.e.t.)	Belenenses	30 June 1932	Campo do Arnado, Coimbra
1931–32	Porto (3)	2–1	Belenenses	17 July 1932	Campo do Arnado, Coimbra
1932–33	Belenenses (3)	3–1	Sporting CP	2 July 1933	Estádio do Lumiar, Lisbon
1933–34	Sporting CP (2)	4–3 (a.e.t.)	Barreirense	8 July 1934	Estádio do Lumiar, Lisbon
1934–35	Benfica (3)	2–1	Sporting CP	30 June 1935	Estádio do Lumiar, Lisbon
1935–36	Sporting CP (3)	3–1	Belenenses	7 July 1936	Estádio do Lumiar, Lisbon
1936–37	Porto (4)	3–2	Sporting CP	4 July 1937	Campo do Arnado, Coimbra
1937–38	Sporting CP (4)	3–1	Benfica	26 June 1938	Estádio do Lumiar, Lisbon

==== Performance by club ====
Club	Winners	Runners-up	Winning years	Runners-up years
Sporting CP	4	6	1923, 1934, 1936, 1938	1922, 1925, 1928, 1933, 1935, 1937
Porto	4	2	1922, 1925, 1932, 1937	1924, 1931
Belenenses	3	3	1927, 1929, 1933	1926, 1932, 1936
Benfica	3	1	1930, 1931, 1935	1938
Olhanense	1	0	1924	–
Marítimo	1	0	1926	–
Carcavelinhos	1	0	1928	–
Barreirense	0	2	–	1930, 1934
Académica	0	1	–	1923
Vitória de Setúbal	0	1	–	1927
União de Lisboa	0	1	–	1929

=== Taça de Portugal (1938–present) ===
Taça de Portugal finals
Season	Winners	Result	Runners-up	Date	Venue
1938–39	Académica	4–3	Benfica	25 June 1939	Campo das Salésias, Lisbon
1939–40	Benfica	3–1	Belenenses	7 July 1940	Estádio do Lumiar, Lisbon
1940–41	Sporting CP	4–1	Belenenses	22 June 1941	Campo das Salésias, Lisbon
1941–42	Belenenses	2–0	Vitória de Guimarães	12 June 1942	Estádio do Lumiar, Lisbon
1942–43	Benfica (2)	5–1	Vitória de Setúbal	20 June 1943	Campo das Salésias, Lisbon
1943–44	Benfica (3)	8–0	Estoril Praia	28 May 1944	Campo das Salésias, Lisbon
1944–45	Sporting CP (2)	1–0	Olhanense	1 July 1945	Campo das Salésias, Lisbon
1945–46	Sporting CP (3)	4–2	Atlético CP	30 June 1946	Estádio Nacional, Jamor
1946–47	Not held due to overscheduling				
1947–48	Sporting CP (4)	3–1	Belenenses	4 July 1948	Estádio Nacional, Jamor
1948–49	Benfica (4)	2–1	Atlético CP	12 June 1949	Estádio Nacional, Jamor
1949–50	Not held, due to the Latin Cup being held at Estádio Nacional				
1950–51	Benfica (5)	5–1	Académica	10 June 1951	Estádio Nacional, Jamor
1951–52	Benfica (6)	5–4	Sporting CP	15 June 1952	Estádio Nacional, Jamor
1952–53	Benfica (7)	5–0	Porto	28 June 1953	Estádio Nacional, Jamor
1953–54	Sporting CP (5)	3–2	Vitória de Setúbal	27 June 1954	Estádio Nacional, Jamor
1954–55	Benfica (8)	2–1	Sporting CP	12 June 1955	Estádio Nacional, Jamor
1955–56	Porto	2–0	Torreense	27 May 1956	Estádio Nacional, Jamor
1956–57	Benfica (9)	3–1	Sporting da Covilhã	2 June 1957	Estádio Nacional, Jamor
1957–58	Porto (2)	1–0	Benfica	15 June 1958	Estádio Nacional, Jamor
1958–59	Benfica (10)	1–0	Porto	19 July 1959	Estádio Nacional, Jamor
1959–60	Belenenses (2)	2–1	Sporting CP	3 July 1960	Estádio Nacional, Jamor
1960–61	Leixões	2–0	Porto	9 July 1961	Estádio das Antas, Porto
1961–62	Benfica (11)	3–0	Vitória de Setúbal	1 July 1962	Estádio Nacional, Jamor
1962–63	Sporting CP (6)	4–0	Vitória de Guimarães	30 June 1963	Estádio Nacional, Jamor
1963–64	Benfica (12)	6–2	Porto	5 July 1964	Estádio Nacional, Jamor
1964–65	Vitória de Setúbal	3–1	Benfica	4 July 1965	Estádio Nacional, Jamor
1965–66	Braga	1–0	Vitória de Setúbal	22 May 1966	Estádio Nacional, Jamor
1966–67	Vitória de Setúbal (2)	3–2 (a.e.t.)	Académica	9 July 1967	Estádio Nacional, Jamor
1967–68	Porto (3)	2–1	Vitória de Setúbal	16 June 1968	Estádio Nacional, Jamor
1968–69	Benfica (13)	2–1 (a.e.t.)	Académica	22 June 1969	Estádio Nacional, Jamor
1969–70	Benfica (14)	3–1	Sporting CP	14 June 1970	Estádio Nacional, Jamor
1970–71	Sporting CP (7)	4–1	Benfica	27 June 1971	Estádio Nacional, Jamor
1971–72	Benfica (15)	3–2 (a.e.t.)	Sporting CP	4 June 1972	Estádio Nacional, Jamor
1972–73	Sporting CP (8)	3–2	Vitória de Setúbal	17 June 1973	Estádio Nacional, Jamor
1973–74	Sporting CP (9)	2–1 (a.e.t.)	Benfica	9 June 1974	Estádio Nacional, Jamor
1974–75	Boavista	2–1	Benfica	14 June 1975	Estádio José Alvalade, Lisbon
1975–76	Boavista (2)	2–1	Vitória de Guimarães	12 June 1976	Estádio das Antas, Porto
1976–77	Porto (4)	1–0	Braga	18 May 1977	Estádio das Antas, Porto
1977–78	Sporting CP (10)	1–1 (a.e.t.)	Porto	18 June 1978	Estádio Nacional, Jamor
1977–78	Sporting CP (10)	2–1	Porto	24 June 1978	Estádio Nacional, Jamor
1978–79	Boavista (3)	1–1 (a.e.t.)	Sporting CP	30 June 1979	Estádio Nacional, Jamor
1978–79	Boavista (3)	1–0	Sporting CP	1 July 1979	Estádio Nacional, Jamor
1979–80	Benfica (16)	1–0	Porto	7 June 1980	Estádio Nacional, Jamor
1980–81	Benfica (17)	3–1	Porto	6 June 1981	Estádio Nacional, Jamor
1981–82	Sporting CP (11)	4–0	Braga	29 May 1982	Estádio Nacional, Jamor
1982–83	Benfica (18)	1–0	Porto	21 August 1983	Estádio das Antas, Porto
1983–84	Porto (5)	4–1	Rio Ave	1 May 1984	Estádio Nacional, Jamor
1984–85	Benfica (19)	3–1	Porto	10 June 1985	Estádio Nacional, Jamor
1985–86	Benfica (20)	2–0	Belenenses	27 April 1986	Estádio Nacional, Jamor
1986–87	Benfica (21)	2–1	Sporting CP	7 June 1987	Estádio Nacional, Jamor
1987–88	Porto (6)	1–0	Vitória de Guimarães	19 June 1988	Estádio Nacional, Jamor
1988–89	Belenenses (3)	2–1	Benfica	28 May 1989	Estádio Nacional, Jamor
1989–90	Estrela da Amadora	1–1 (a.e.t.)	Farense	27 May 1990	Estádio Nacional, Jamor
1989–90	Estrela da Amadora	2–0	Farense	3 June 1990	Estádio Nacional, Jamor
1990–91	Porto (7)	3–1 (a.e.t.)	Beira-Mar	2 June 1991	Estádio Nacional, Jamor
1991–92	Boavista (4)	2–1	Porto	24 May 1992	Estádio Nacional, Jamor
1992–93	Benfica (22)	5–2	Boavista	10 June 1993	Estádio Nacional, Jamor
1993–94	Porto (8)	0–0 (a.e.t.)	Sporting CP	5 June 1994	Estádio Nacional, Jamor
1993–94	Porto (8)	2–1 (a.e.t.)	Sporting CP	10 June 1994	Estádio Nacional, Jamor
1994–95	Sporting CP (12)	2–0	Marítimo	10 June 1995	Estádio Nacional, Jamor
1995–96	Benfica (23)	3–1	Sporting CP	18 May 1996	Estádio Nacional, Jamor
1996–97	Boavista (5)	3–2	Benfica	10 June 1997	Estádio Nacional, Jamor
1997–98	Porto (9)	3–1	Braga	14 June 1998	Estádio Nacional, Jamor
1998–99	Beira-Mar	1–0	Campomaiorense	16 June 1999	Estádio Nacional, Jamor
1999–00	Porto (10)	1–1 (a.e.t.)	Sporting CP	21 May 2000	Estádio Nacional, Jamor
1999–00	Porto (10)	2–0	Sporting CP	25 May 2000	Estádio Nacional, Jamor
2000–01	Porto (11)	2–0	Marítimo	10 June 2001	Estádio Nacional, Jamor
2001–02	Sporting CP (13)	1–0	Leixões	12 May 2002	Estádio Nacional, Jamor
Replay matches abolished
2002–03	Porto (12)	1–0	União de Leiria	15 June 2003	Estádio Nacional, Jamor
2003–04	Benfica (24)	2–1 (a.e.t.)	Porto	16 May 2004	Estádio Nacional, Jamor
2004–05	Vitória de Setúbal (3)	2–1	Benfica	29 May 2005	Estádio Nacional, Jamor
2005–06	Porto (13)	1–0	Vitória de Setúbal	14 May 2006	Estádio Nacional, Jamor
2006–07	Sporting CP (14)	1–0	Belenenses	27 May 2007	Estádio Nacional, Jamor
2007–08	Sporting CP (15)	2–0 (a.e.t.)	Porto	18 May 2008	Estádio Nacional, Jamor
2008–09	Porto (14)	1–0	Paços de Ferreira	31 May 2009	Estádio Nacional, Jamor
2009–10	Porto (15)	2–1	Chaves	16 May 2010	Estádio Nacional, Jamor
2010–11	Porto (16)	6–2	Vitória de Guimarães	22 May 2011	Estádio Nacional, Jamor
2011–12	Académica (2)	1–0	Sporting CP	20 May 2012	Estádio Nacional, Jamor
2012–13	Vitória de Guimarães	2–1	Benfica	26 May 2013	Estádio Nacional, Jamor
2013–14	Benfica (25)	1–0	Rio Ave	18 May 2014	Estádio Nacional, Jamor
2014–15	Sporting CP (16)	2–2 (3–1 p)	Braga	31 May 2015	Estádio Nacional, Jamor
2015–16	Braga (2)	2–2 (4–2 p)	Porto	22 May 2016	Estádio Nacional, Jamor
2016–17	Benfica (26)	2–1	Vitória de Guimarães	28 May 2017	Estádio Nacional, Jamor
2017–18	Desportivo das Aves	2–1	Sporting CP	20 May 2018	Estádio Nacional, Jamor
2018–19	Sporting CP (17)	2–2 (5–4 p)	Porto	25 May 2019	Estádio Nacional, Jamor
2019–20	Porto (17)	2–1	Benfica	1 August 2020	Estádio Cidade de Coimbra, Coimbra
2020–21	Braga (3)	2–0	Benfica	23 May 2021	Estádio Cidade de Coimbra, Coimbra
2021–22	Porto (18)	3–1	Tondela	22 May 2022	Estádio Nacional, Jamor
2022–23	Porto (19)	2–0	Braga	4 June 2023	Estádio Nacional, Jamor
2023–24	Porto (20)	2–1 (a.e.t.)	Sporting CP	26 May 2024	Estádio Nacional, Jamor
2024–25	Sporting CP (18)	3–1 (a.e.t.)	Benfica	25 May 2025	Estádio Nacional, Jamor
2025–26	Torreense	2–1 (a.e.t.)	Sporting CP	24 May 2026	Estádio Nacional, Jamor

=== Performance by club ===
Club	Winners	Runners-up	Winning years	Runners-up years
Benfica	26	13	1940, 1943, 1944, 1949, 1951, 1952, 1953, 1955, 1957, 1959, 1962, 1964, 1969, 1970, 1972, 1980, 1981, 1983, 1985, 1986, 1987, 1993, 1996, 2004, 2014, 2017	1939, 1958, 1965, 1971, 1974, 1975, 1989, 1997, 2005, 2013, 2020, 2021, 2025
Porto	20	14	1956, 1958, 1968, 1977, 1984, 1988, 1991, 1994, 1998, 2000, 2001, 2003, 2006, 2009, 2010, 2011, 2020, 2022, 2023, 2024	1953, 1959, 1961, 1964, 1978, 1980, 1981, 1983, 1985, 1992, 2004, 2008, 2016, 2019
Sporting CP	18	14	1941, 1945, 1946, 1948, 1954, 1963, 1971, 1973, 1974, 1978, 1982, 1995, 2002, 2007, 2008, 2015, 2019, 2025	1952, 1955, 1960, 1970, 1972, 1979, 1987, 1994, 1996, 2000, 2012, 2018, 2024, 2026
Boavista	5	1	1975, 1976, 1979, 1992, 1997	1993
Vitória de Setúbal	3	7	1965, 1967, 2005	1943, 1954, 1962, 1966, 1968, 1973, 2006
Belenenses	3	5	1942, 1960, 1989	1940, 1941, 1948, 1986, 2007
Braga	3	5	1966, 2016, 2021	1977, 1982, 1998, 2015, 2023
Académica	2	3	1939, 2012	1951, 1967, 1969
Vitória de Guimarães	1	6	2013	1942, 1963, 1976, 1988, 2011, 2017
Leixões	1	1	1961	2002
Beira-Mar	1	1	1999	1991
Torreense	1	1	2026	1956
Estrela da Amadora	1	0	1990	–
Desportivo das Aves	1	0	2018	–
Atlético CP	0	2	–	1946, 1949
Marítimo	0	2	–	1995, 2001
Rio Ave	0	2	–	1984, 2014
Estoril Praia	0	1	–	1944
Olhanense	0	1	–	1945
Sporting da Covilhã	0	1	–	1957
Farense	0	1	–	1990
Campomaiorense	0	1	–	1999
União de Leiria	0	1	–	2003
Paços de Ferreira	0	1	–	2009
Chaves	0	1	–	2010
Tondela	0	1	–	2022

== See also ==
- List of association football competitions in Portugal
- List of Taça de Portugal winning managers
