= C.F. Os Belenenses =

Portuguese professional football club

Os Belenenses
- Full name: Clube de Futebol Os Belenenses
- Nicknames: O Belém (Bethlehem); Os Azuis do Restelo (The Blues from Restelo); Pastéis (Pastries); A Cruz de Cristo (The Cross of Christ)
- Founded: 23 September 1919; 107 years ago
- Ground: Estádio do Restelo
- Capacity: 19,856
- President: Patrick Morais de Carvalho
- Head coach: Gonçalo Brandão
- League: Liga 3
- 2025–26: Liga 3, First stage Série B, 1st of 10; Promotion stage, 3rd of 8
- Website: osbelenenses.com
Home colours	Away colours	Third colours

Clube de Futebol Os Belenenses (Portuguese pronunciation: [bɨlɨˈnẽsɨʃ]), commonly known as Os Belenenses or simply Belenenses, is a Portuguese sports club best known for its football team, which currently competes in Liga 3, the third tier of the Portuguese football league system. Founded in 1919, it is one of the oldest Portuguese sports clubs. It is based in the 19,856-seat Estádio do Restelo in Belém, Lisbon, hence the club name, which translates as "The ones from Belém". Among its fanbase, the club is commonly nicknamed O Belém, in reference to the neighborhood; Os Pastéis (The Pastries), in reference to a traditional Portuguese pastry originated in Belém; Azuis (Blues) or Azuis do Restelo (The Blues from Restelo), in reference to the club's color and its home stadium; and A Cruz de Cristo (The Order of Christ Cross), for its emblem, or also "Os Rapazes da Praia" (The Boys of the Beach), a reference to the zone of Belém in the earlier 20th century.

Belenenses won the 1945–46 Primeira Liga, making them the first club other than the Big Three to win the league title. Belenenses has also won six Championship of Portugal/Portuguese Cup trophies, and is the fifth most decorated team in Portuguese football. It is also the fourth club with the most podium finishes, with a total of 19 presences in the three first places.

Until 1982, Belenenses was one of four teams that had never been relegated from the first division. Nowadays, it is the team with the fourth most seasons in the Primeira Liga as well as the team with the fifth most points in the championship's history.

Belenenses was the first Portuguese team with a turf pitch and artificial lighting, and was also the first Portuguese club to participate in the UEFA Europa League.

The main sports of the club are football, handball, basketball, futsal, athletics, and rugby union. The club has won national championships in all these sports, but it remains best known for football, its original activity. In the club's history, Belenenses has won more than 10,000 trophies, including the first divisions of football, handball, basketball, rugby, and the Portuguese Cup in football and futsal, among other sports.

== History ==
=== Early years ===
Founded in 1919, Belenenses reached their first Campeonato final in 1926, losing 2–0 to Marítimo, and won the title the next season with a 3–0 win over Vitória de Setúbal and winning a second championship in 1929. The club lost the 1932 title to Porto 2–1 in a replay after a 4–4 draw. The club won its third and final Campeonato in 1933 after defeating Sporting CP 3–1. With three Campeonato wins, Belenenses was one of Portugal's "Big Four".

At this time, José Manuel Soares (Pepe), one of the first idols of Portuguese football, stood out. His story began in a match against Benfica in which, with 15 minutes to go, Belenenses were losing 4–1, but the club managed to draw level at 4-4. In the final minutes of the match, Belenenses had a penalty in their favor, and Pepe, who was making his debut, didn't flinch and made the score 4–5 in favor of "The Boys of the Beach". Unfortunately, Pepe died prematurely at the age of 23, accidentally poisoned by his mother. In his memory, Belenenses erected a mausoleum at the Restelo stadium, where Porto, whenever they play there, lay a wreath in honor of the player, in one of the oldest traditions in Portuguese football.

=== League champions ===
The club won its only Primeira Liga title in 1945–46, edging Benfica by one point, the first time that a club outside the Big Three won the title. On 14 December 1947, they were the first team to face Real Madrid at their newly inaugurated Santiago Bernabéu Stadium (then called the Nuevo Estadio Chamartín) in a friendly match won 3–1 by Madrid.

The club were runners-up in the league in the 1954–55 season, level on 39 points with Benfica, losing the title just four minutes from the end with a draw against Sporting. The following year, Belenenses moved to the Estadio do Restelo, which involved a large investment and the sale of the best players, resulting in quality diminishing. It was not until 1973 that Belenenses finished as runners-up again, 18 points behind Benfica, and they never have since.

=== European forays ===
Belenenses were the first club to compete in the UEFA Cup in a two-legged 3–3 draw with Hibernian at the Estádio do Restelo in Belém.

The club has also played in the European Cup Winners' Cup. In the 1987–88 UEFA Cup, the club played Barcelona. In the first leg, they lost 2–0 in the Camp Nou, winning 1–0 at the Estádio do Restelo with Mapuata scoring, coached by Marinho Peres, a former Barcelona player. Belenenses won their sixth (and to date last) Taça de Portugal on 28 May 1989, defeating Benfica 2–1. Also that season, they knocked out the holders Bayer Leverkusen from the Cup Winners' Cup.

=== Downfall and recovery ===
Belenenses were relegated from the Primeira Liga for the first time in 1981–82, and have been relegated three other times since then.

=== 21st century ===
The 2005–06 season saw Belenenses finishing fourth from bottom, which would mean relegation for the team. However, as Gil Vicente had fielded an ineligible player that season, Belenenses won a subsequent appeal which saw them remain in the top division with Gil Vicente being relegated instead.

On 27 May 2007, coached by Jorge Jesus, Belenenses reached their first Taça de Portugal final since their 1989 triumph, but were defeated 1–0 by Sporting CP.

Cabral Ferreira, who served as club president of Belenenses from 2005 until 2008, died on 26 February 2008 after a long illness. Belenenses were relegated in 2010 to the Segunda Liga, but secured promotion back to the Primeira Liga in March 2013, their longest stint out of the top division, with a record breaking score of 96 points.

During the 2014–15 season, Belenenses finished the championship in sixth place, thereby returning to European competition, qualifying for the 2015–16 UEFA Europa League.

They reached the group stage of the 2015–16 UEFA Europa League after eliminating IFK Göteborg (2–1 on aggregate) and Rheindorf Altach (1–0 on aggregate). They finished fourth and last in their group, recording a surprising 2–1 away win against Basel, but drawing 0–0 twice against Lech Poznań, losing the return match against Basel, and losing both matches to Fiorentina.

=== Club split ===
At the end of 2017–18 season, CF Os Belenenses (club) and Belenenses SAD went their separate ways, as the "Protocol on the use of Estádio do Restelo" ended and the SAD refused to negotiate a new contract with the club. So from the 2018–19 season, Belenenses SAD (the professional team) play their Primeira Liga home games at Estádio Nacional, whereas CF Os Belenenses registered an amateur team in 1ª Divisão Distrital de Lisboa, the equivalent to the Sixth Division (lowest Portuguese division), with the support of the majority of fans and club members.

As a consequence, Belenenses SAD was legally forbidden from using Belenenses' logo and name and now uses a new logo (along with being renamed to B-SAD after the 2021–22 season). In the first games of the season, the professional team saw home attendances of only a few hundred, whereas the new, amateur team saw home attendances of approximately 5,000, reversing a long decline in attendance figures.

Since then, Belenenses have climbed up the division five times in a row, until they reach professional competition again in 2023, equaling the world record. Belenenses' first win in professional competition came at Tondela, in a game they won 1-0 and the scorer was André Serra, the only player in the squad to have made the whole journey with the club from the bottom of the Portuguese football.

=== Social Responsibility ===
In September 2023, the club was distinguished with the Liga Portugal Social Responsibility Award for the "Todos Podemos Fazer a Diferença" Blood Donation and Bone Marrow Registration Campaign organised in partnership with KUBOO Self-Storage and the Portuguese Blood Institute.

From December 2023 on, the club, in partnership with KUBOO Self-Storage and IPEIP- As Descobertas organise and host at Estádio do Restelo a celebration of the International Day of People with Disabilities (December 3). The event is destined to young kids from the schools of Lisbon (regular and special education), and consists on series of sporting and artistic activities throughout a morning. This celebration intends to raise awareness for equality, friendship and respect despite differences among young generations.

== Honours ==
=== Domestic ===
- Primeira Liga
  - Winners (1): 1945–46
- Taça de Portugal
  - Winners (3): 1941–42, 1959–60, 1988–89
  - Runners-up (5): 1939–40, 1940–41, 1947–48, 1985–86, 2006–07
- Supertaça Cândido de Oliveira
  - Runners-up (1): 1989
- Campeonato de Portugal
  - Winners (3): 1926–27, 1928–29, 1932–33
  - Runners-up (3): 1925–26, 1931–32, 1935–36
- Segunda Divisão / Segunda Liga
  - Winners (2): 1983–84, 2012–13
- Lisbon FA 1ª Divisão
  - Winners (2): 2018–19 (3rd tier), 2020–21 (1st tier)
- Lisbon Championship
  - Winners (6): 1925–26, 1928–29, 1929–30, 1931–32, 1943–44, 1945–46

=== European ===
- Intertoto Cup
  - Winners (1): 1975

== League and cup history ==
Season	League	Pos.	Pl.	W	D	L	GS	GA	P	Cup	League Cup	Europe		Notes
1934–35	CL	4	14	8	2	4	45	20	18	Quarter-final				The cup competition played in Portugal was still the Portuguese Championship, while the league worked as an experimental competition.
1935–36	CL	4	14	7	3	4	28	22	17	Final				The cup competition played in Portugal was still the Portuguese Championship, while the league worked as an experimental competition.
1936–37	CL	2	14	11	1	2	46	17	23	Quarter-final				The cup competition played in Portugal was still the Portuguese Championship, while the league worked as an experimental competition.
1937–38	CL	5	14	5	0	9	29	28	10	Quarter-final				The cup competition played in Portugal was still the Portuguese Championship, while the league worked as an experimental competition.
1938–39	1D	4	14	6	1	7	38	29	13	Quarter-final				First season of both the Portuguese Cup and Primeira Liga.
1939–40	1D	3	18	11	3	4	58	21	25	Final				
1940–41	1D	3	14	9	1	4	59	22	19	Final				
1941–42	1D	3	22	12	6	4	66	32	30	Winners				
1942–43	1D	3	18	14	0	4	78	20	28	Quarter-final				
1943–44	1D	6	18	9	3	6	41	32	21	Quarter-final				
1944–45	1D	2	18	13	1	4	72	29	27	Quarter-final				
1945–46	1D	1	22	18	2	2	74	24	38	Last 16				Only League title
1946–47	1D	4	26	14	5	7	66	31	33	Not held				
1947–48	1D	3	26	16	5	5	76	30	37	Final				
1948–49	1D	3	26	16	3	7	68	36	35	Last 16				
1949–50	1D	4	26	10	7	9	36	41	27	Not held				
1950–51	1D	9	26	10	4	12	45	48	24	Semi-final				
1951–52	1D	4	26	14	8	4	60	28	36	Quarter-final				
1952–53	1D	3	26	15	6	5	60	29	36	Last 16				
1953–54	1D	4	26	13	5	8	43	39	31	Semi-final				
1954–55	1D	2	26	17	5	4	63	28	39	Quarter-final		Lat	4th place	
1955–56	1D	3	26	16	5	5	67	25	37	Semi-final				
1956–57	1D	3	26	13	7	6	74	50	33	Last 16				
1957–58	1D	4	26	12	4	10	54	42	28	Last 16				
1958–59	1D	3	26	16	6	4	65	27	38	Quarter-final				
1959–60	1D	3	26	15	6	5	58	25	36	Winners				
1960–61	1D	5	26	12	4	10	45	37	28	Semi-final				
1961–62	1D	5	26	12	7	7	51	35	31	Semi-final		FC	1st round	
1962–63	1D	4	26	16	4	6	47	30	36	Semi-final		FC	1st round	
1963–64	1D	6	26	12	6	8	46	36	30	Semi-final		FC	2nd round	
1964–65	1D	8	26	12	2	12	39	40	26	Quarter-final		FC	1st round	
1965–66	1D	7	26	9	7	10	28	29	25	2nd round				
1966–67	1D	11	26	7	6	13	26	34	20	3rd round				
1967–68	1D	7	26	10	5	11	38	40	25	Quarter-final				
1968–69	1D	8	26	8	10	8	31	33	26	Quarter-final				
1969–70	1D	7	26	9	5	12	23	34	23	Semi-final				
1970–71	1D	7	26	7	8	11	20	27	22	Quarter-final				
1971–72	1D	7	30	11	7	12	35	33	29	Semi-final				
1972–73	1D	2	30	14	12	4	53	30	40	Last 32				
1973–74	1D	5	30	17	6	7	56	34	40	Last 16		UC	1st round	
1974–75	1D	6	30	14	7	9	45	37	35	Semi-final				
1975–76	1D	3	30	16	8	6	45	28	40	Last 16		IC	GC	
1976–77	1D	10	30	7	12	11	29	40	26	2nd round		IC; UC	2nd Gr; 1st round	
1977–78	1D	5	30	14	8	8	25	21	36	Last 32				
1978–79	1D	8	30	10	9	11	47	43	29	Last 16				
1979–80	1D	5	30	13	8	9	33	38	34	Last 16				
1980–81	1D	11	30	8	10	12	24	39	26	Semi-final				
1981–82	1D	15	30	5	10	15	28	48	20	Last 16				relegated
1982–83	2D.S	4	30	12	10	8	35	19	34	Last 64				
1983–84	2D.S	1	30	18	8	4	49	13	44	Last 16				promoted
1984–85	1D	6	30	11	8	11	40	46	30	Last 64				
1985–86	1D	8	30	7	14	9	27	30	28	Final				
1986–87	1D	6	30	13	4	13	52	40	30	Last 64				
1987–88	1D	3	38	18	12	8	52	38	48	Last 128		UC	1st round	
1988–89	1D	7	38	13	14	11	44	35	40	Winners		UC	2nd round	
1989–90	1D	6	34	16	4	14	32	33	36	Semi-final		CWC	1st round	
1990–91	1D	19	38	10	9	19	27	38	29	Last 64				relegated
1991–92	2H	2	34	19	10	5	53	25	48	5th round				promoted
1992–93	1D	7	34	11	12	11	42	40	34	6th round				
1993–94	1D	13	34	12	6	16	39	51	30	Quarter-final				
1994–95	1D	12	34	10	7	17	30	39	27	4th round				
1995–96	1D	6	34	14	9	1	53	33	51	6th round				
1996–97	1D	13	34	10	10	14	37	50	40	5th round				
1997–98	1D	18	34	5	9	20	22	52	24	4th round				relegated
1998–99	2H	2	34	17	10	7	55	28	61	3rd round				promoted
1999–00	1D	12	34	9	13	12	36	38	40	4th round				
2000–01	1D	7	34	14	10	10	43	36	52	5th round				
2001–02	1D	5	34	17	6	11	54	44	57	6th round				
2002–03	1D	9	34	11	10	13	47	48	43	5th round		IC	2nd round	
2003–04	1D	15	34	8	11	15	35	54	35	Semi-final				
2004–05	1D	9	34	13	7	14	38	34	46	Quarter-final				
2005–06	1D	15	34	11	6	17	40	42	39	4th round				
2006–07	1D	5	30	15	4	11	36	29	49	Final				
2007–08	1D	8	30	11	10	9	35	33	40	4th round	Last 16	UC	1st round	3 points deducted; Taça da Liga 1st edition
2008–09	1D	15	30	5	9	16	28	52	24	Last 32	Group stage 2			
2009–10	1D	15	30	4	11	15	23	44	23	Last 16	Group stage 1			relegated
2010–11	2H	13	30	8	11	11	33	36	35	Last 64	Group stage 1			
2011–12	2H	5	30	10	11	9	34	32	41	Last 16	1st round			
2012–13	2H	1	42	29	7	6	75	41	94	Semi-final	Group stage 1			Promoted; Liga 2 champions
2013–14	1D	14	30	6	10	14	19	33	28	Last 64	Group stage 2			
2014–15	1D	6	34	12	12	10	34	35	48	Quarter final	Group stage 2			
2015–16	1D	9	34	10	11	13	44	66	41	Last 32	Group stage	EL	Group stage	
2016–17	1D	14	34	9	9	16	27	45	36	Last 64	Group stage			
2017–18	1D	12	34	9	10	15	33	46	37	Last 64	Group stage			Separation from Belenenses SAD
2018–19	L.3D	1	30	27	1	2	143	17	82	Did not compete	Did not compete			Promoted; won group 2 of the Lisbon FA 3rd Division and then became overall champions
2019–20	L.2D	1	20	18	0	2	62	16	54	Did not compete	Did not compete			Promoted; league was concluded at 20 games due to COVID-19 pandemic
2020–21	L.1D	1	18	15	2	1	38	10	47	Did not compete	Did not compete			Promoted; Lisbon FA 1st Division champions
2021–22	CP	1	18	10	3	5	25	12	33	Last 64	Did not compete			Group E of Campeonato de Portugal
2021–22	CP	3	10	4	4	2	17	9	16	Last 64	Did not compete			South Zone promotion play-off; promoted to Liga 3 due to Cova da Piedade's registration failure
2022–23	L3	4	22	10	5	7	38	27	35	Third round	Did not compete			promoted to Liga Portugal 2 via promotion play-off
2023–24	2D	18	34	6	8	20	28	59	26	Third round	Did not compete			relegated
2024-25	L3	3	18	6	9	3	22	18	27	Third round	Did not compete			Lost Promotion Playoff 2-3 (agg) v Paços de Ferreira
2024-25	L3	3	14	5	7	2	19	13	22	Third round	Did not compete			Lost Promotion Playoff 2-3 (agg) v Paços de Ferreira
2025-26	L3	1	18	12	2	4	27	16	38	Third round	Did not compete			Lost Promotion Playoff 0-1 (agg) v Farense
2025-26	L3	3	14	7	5	2	25	16	26	Third round	Did not compete			Lost Promotion Playoff 0-1 (agg) v Farense

CL=Campeonato da Liga (winners weren't considered Portuguese champions);
1D=First Division/League
2D=Second Division/League;
2H=Liga de Honra
CWC=Cup Winners' Cup;
UC=UEFA Cup
FC=Fairs Cup;
LAT=Latin Cup;
IC=Intertoto Cup
CP=Campeonato de Portugal (4th tier of Portuguese football);
L.1D=Lisbon FA 1st Division (Lisbon's 3rd level in 2018-19 and 1st level in 2020–21);
L.2D=Lisbon FA 2st Division (Lisbon's 2nd level in 2019–20);
L3=Liga 3

== European record ==
Season	Competition	Round	Opponent	Home	Away	Aggregate
1961–62	Inter-Cities Fairs Cup	1R	(Scotland) Hibernian	1–3	3–3	4–6
1962–63	Inter-Cities Fairs Cup	1R	(Spain) Barcelona	1–1	1–1	2–2^{1}
1963–64	Inter-Cities Fairs Cup	1R	(Socialist Federal Republic of Yugoslavia) Tresnjevka Zagreb	2–0	2–1	4–1
1963–64	Inter-Cities Fairs Cup	2R	(Italy) Roma	0–1	1–2	1–3
1964–65	Inter-Cities Fairs Cup	1R	(Republic of Ireland) Shelbourne	1–1	0–0	1–1^{2}
1973–74	UEFA Cup	1R	(England) Wolverhampton Wanderers	0–2	1–2	1–4
1976–77	UEFA Cup	1R	(Spain) Barcelona	2–2	2–3	4–5
1987–88	UEFA Cup	1R	(Spain) Barcelona	1–0	0–2	1–2
1988–89	UEFA Cup	1R	(Germany) Bayer Leverkusen	1–0	1–0	2–0
1988–89	UEFA Cup	2R	(Socialist Federal Republic of Yugoslavia) Velež Mostar	0–0	0–0	0–0^{3}
1989–90	European Cup Winners' Cup	1R	(France) Monaco	1–1	0–3	1–4
2007–08	UEFA Cup	1R	(Germany) Bayern Munich	0–2	0–1	0–3
2015–16	UEFA Europa League	3Q	(Sweden) IFK Göteborg	2–1	0–0	2–1
2015–16	UEFA Europa League	PO	(Austria) Rheindorf Altach	0–0	1–0	1–0
2015–16	UEFA Europa League	Group I	(Switzerland) Basel	0–2	2–1	4th place
2015–16	UEFA Europa League	Group I	(Italy) Fiorentina	0–4	0–1	4th place
2015–16	UEFA Europa League	Group I	(Poland) Lech Poznań	0–0	0–0	4th place

Notes

- 1R: First round
- 2R: Second round
- 3Q: Third qualifying round
- PO: Play-off round

^{1} Barcelona progressed to the second round after winning a play-off match 3–2.
^{2} Shelbourne progressed to the second round after winning a play-off match 2–1.
^{3} Velež Mostar progressed to the third round after winning a penalty shoot-out 4–3.

== Players ==
=== Current squad ===
As of 21 September 2026

Note: Flags indicate national team as defined under FIFA eligibility rules; some limited exceptions apply. Players may hold more than one non-FIFA nationality.

No.	Pos.	Nation	Player
4	DF	POR	Nuno Tomás
7	FW	POR	Valter Zacarias
8	MF	COL	David Herrera
9	FW	BRA	Eduardo Love
10	FW	POR	Midana Sambú
11	FW	POR	João Oliveira
14	MF	POR	Afonso Afonso
15	DF	POR	João Lucas
17	MF	POR	Diogo Leitão
19	MF	POR	Afonso Valente
20	FW	POR	Tiago Moninhas
21	MF	POR	Tiago Morgado
22	DF	POR	Miguel Bandarra
23	FW	POR	Bruninho
27	MF	POR	Evandro Barros

No.	Pos.	Nation	Player
33	FW	MOZ	Chamito (on loan from Académico Viseu)
38	FW	BRA	Lian (on loan from Ponferradina)
39	DF	POR	Afonso Pinto
41	DF	ANG	Caica (on loan from Estrela da Amadora)
53	GK	POR	Bruno Dias
58	DF	POR	David Monteiro
66	DF	BRA	Cesinha
70	FW	GBS	Nikson
77	FW	POR	Ricardo Fevereiro
81	MF	POR	Diogo Maria
85	DF	POR	Diogo Varela
95	GK	BRA	Diego Riechelmann
99	GK	POR	Guilherme Oliveira
—	GK	URU	Sebastián Álvarez

=== Out on loan ===
Note: Flags indicate national team as defined under FIFA eligibility rules; some limited exceptions apply. Players may hold more than one non-FIFA nationality.

No. / Pos. / Nation / Player; — / FW / COL / Camilo Acosta (at Real Massama until 30 June 2027)	No. / Pos. / Nation / Player; — / FW / POR / João Simões (at Sintrense until 30 June 2027)

== Former coaches ==
- (Portugal) Cândido de Oliveira (1937–38)
- (Hungary) Lippo Hertzka (1939–40)
- (Argentina) Alejandro Scopelli (1939–41)
- (Hungary) Sándor Peics (1943–44)
- (Argentina) Alejandro Scopelli (1947–48)
- (Portugal) Artur Quaresma (1948–49)
- (Hungary) Sándor Peics (1950–51)
- (Portugal) Fernando Vaz (1951–53)
- (Chile) Fernando Riera (1954–57)
- (Argentina) Helenio Herrera (1957–58)
- (Portugal) Fernando Vaz (1958–59)
- (Brazil) Otto Glória (1959–61)
- (Portugal) Fernando Vaz (1962–64)
- (Spain) Ángel Zubieta (1964)
- (Austria) Franz Fuchs (1 July 1964 – 30 June 1965)
- (Spain) Ángel Zubieta (1968–69)
- (Portugal) Mário Wilson (1968–70)
- (Argentina) Alejandro Scopelli (1972–74)
- (Portugal) Juca (1 July 1979 – 30 June 1980)
- (England) Jimmy Hagan (1980–81)
- (Portugal) Artur Jorge (1981)
- (Portugal) Nelo Vingada (1 July 1981 – 30 June 1982)
- (Portugal) José Mourinho Félix (1982–83)
- (England) Jimmy Melia (1983–86)
- (Brazil) Marinho Peres (1988–89)
- (England) John Mortimore (1988–89)
- (Bulgaria) Hristo Mladenov (1989)
- (Brazil) Antônio Lopes (1990)
- (Belgium) Henri Depireux (1990–1991)
- (Brazil) Abel Braga (1992–93)
- (Portugal) José Romão (1993–94)
- (Portugal) João Alves (1994–96)
- (Portugal) Quinito (1996)
- (Bulgaria) Stoycho Mladenov (1997)
- (Portugal) Manuel Cajuda (1 July 1997–98)
- (Portugal) Vítor Oliveira (1998–00)
- (Brazil) Marinho Peres (2000–03)
- (Portugal) Manuel José (11 Feb 2003 – 22 Nov 2003)
- (Serbia) Vladislav Bogićević (26 Nov 2003 – 20 Jan 2004)
- (Portugal) Augusto Inácio (20 Jan 2004 – 12 May 2004)
- (Portugal) Carlos Carvalhal (21 May 2004 – 27 Oct 2005)
- (Portugal) José Couceiro (28 Oct 2005 – 7 May 2006)
- (Portugal) Jorge Jesus (12 May 2006 – 19 May 2008)
- (Brazil) Casemiro Mior (1 July 2008 – 8 Oct 2008)
- (Portugal) Jaime Pacheco (9 Oct 2008 – 11 May 2009)
- (Portugal) Rui Jorge (12 May 2009 – 25 May 2009)
- (Portugal) João Carlos Pereira (4 June 2009 – 21 Dec 2009)
- (Portugal) António Conceição (23 Dec 2009 – 9 May 2010)
- (Brazil) Baltemar Brito (5 June 2010 – 6 July 2010)
- (Portugal) Rui Gregório (8 July 2010 – 26 Oct 2010)
- (Brazil) Filgueira (interim) (27 Oct 2010 – 1 Nov 2010)
- (Portugal) José Mota (2 Nov 2010 – 14 Feb 2012)
- (Portugal) Marco Paulo (15 Feb 2012 – 14 May 2012)
- (Netherlands) Mitchell van der Gaag (1 July 2012 – 26 Sept 2013)
- (Portugal) Marco Paulo (interim) (26 Sept 2013 – 18 March 2014)
- (Angola) Lito Vidigal (20 March 2014 – 17 March 2015)
- (Serbia) Milos Dukic (18 March 2015 – 30 June 2015)
- (Portugal) Ricardo Sá Pinto (1 July 2015 – 15 December 2015)
- (Spain) Julio Velázquez (17 December 2015 – 5 October 2016)
- (Portugal) Quim Machado (6 October 2016 – 17 April 2017)
- (Portugal) Domingos Paciência (18 April 2017 – 16 January 2018)
- (Portugal) Silas (19 January 2018 – 30 June 2018)
- (Portugal) Nuno Oliveira (20 July 2018 – 3 November 2021)
- (Portugal) Hugo Martins (4 November 2021 – 6 June 2022)
- (Portugal) Bruno Dias (11 June 2022 – 4 November 2023)
- (Portugal) Vasco Faísca (6 November 2023 – Present)

== See also ==
- C.F. Os Belenenses (basketball)
- C.F. Os Belenenses (futsal)
- C.F. Os Belenenses (handball)
- C.F. Os Belenenses (rugby union)
- B-SAD
- CSA Steaua București (football)
