= 1936–37 S.L. Benfica season =

Benfica
1936–37 season
- President: Vasco Rosa Ribeiro (until 4 November 1936); Manuel da Conceição Afonso
- Head coach: Lippo Hertzka
- Stadium: Estádio da Luz
- Primeira Divisão: 1st
- Campeonato de Portugal: Semi-Final
- Campeonato de Lisboa: 2nd
- Top goalscorer: League: Rogério Sousa (19); All: Rogério Sousa (32)
- Biggest win: Benfica 10–2 Leixões (31 January 1937)
- Biggest defeat: Benfica 0–5 Sporting (18 October 1936)
Home colours	Away colours

The 1936–37 season was Sport Lisboa e Benfica's 33th season in existence and the club's 3rd consecutive season in the top flight of Portuguese football, covering the period from 1 September 1936 to 30 June 1937. Benfica competed in the Campeonato da Liga, the Campeonato de Portugal and in the Campeonato de Lisboa.

Benfica entered the new season aiming to defend its league title while also targeting success in the Campeonato de Portugal and the Campeonato de Lisboa. Under new manager Lippo Hertzka, who replaced Vítor Gonçalves after the club's first league triumph, the team rebuilt parts of the squad with notable additions such as Guilherme Espírito Santo. Benfica finished runner-up in the Campeonato de Lisboa after losing the title on the final matchday, but excelled in the league, securing back-to-back championships, becoming the first team to do so in Portuguese league history. In the Campeonato de Portugal, the club advanced to the semi-finals, where it was eliminated by Sporting.

== Season summary ==
Benfica entered the season seeking to defend the league title it had secured the previous year, to reclaim the Campeonato de Portugal title, and to win the Campeonato de Lisboa. After guiding the team to its first league championship, manager Vítor Gonçalves left the club and was replaced by the Hungarian coach Lippo Hertzka. During the off-season, Francisco Gatinho departed for Belenenses and Guedes Gonçalves joined União de Lisboa, while club icon Vítor Silva retired. Several players were added to the squad, with Guilherme Espírito Santo being the most notable arrival.

Before the start of the Campeonato de Lisboa, Benfica played eight preparation matches, recording three wins, two draws, and two losses. Six of these encounters were against local rivals Belenenses and Sporting, with the most notable taking place on 13 September, a 2–1 victory marking the farewell match of Vítor Silva, who scored the winning goal.

Benfica began the Campeonato de Lisboa with a goalless draw against Casa Pia, followed by a 5–0 home defeat to Sporting in the first Derby de Lisboa of the season. The team responded with a 3–1 victory over Belenenses, but dropped points again in a 1–1 away draw with Barreirense. In the following two matches, Benfica scored a total of 13 goals, winning both, and moved into first place after Sporting dropped points in the same round.

On 22 November, Benfica visited Sporting in a decisive clash, drawing 1–1 and retaining first place, now level on points with Belenenses. The team then travelled to face Belenenses, winning 4–3 with a hat-trick from Rogério Sousa. A 3–1 win over Barreirense ensured that the title would be decided on the final matchday. However, a surprising 2–1 loss to Carcavelinhos in the last round handed the championship to Sporting.

Before the start of the Campeonato da Liga, Benfica played four preparation matches, winning three and drawing one. Two of these were against Porto, with Benfica winning 5–1 in Lisbon and drawing 3–3 in Porto. Benfica began its league title defense with a 2–1 away victory against Vitória de Setúbal. The team won its next two league matches as well, finishing January in first place with a two-point lead over Porto.

On 14 February, Benfica visited Sporting in the derby, winning 4–1 with two goals from Rogério. The team followed this result with victories over Académica and Belenenses, ending the month with a four-point lead over Académica. Benfica began March with an away trip to face Porto in O Clássico, losing 2–1 and seeing its lead reduced to two points. The team then responded with two more victories, scoring 11 goals, and finished the month with a three-point advantage at the top of the table.

April began with a 6–0 win over Leixões, before Benfica faced Sporting in the derby. On 11 April, Benfica defeated Sporting 5–1, maintaining a three-point lead with three matches remaining. In the following match, the team beat Académica, but a 1–0 away loss to Belenenses postponed the title decision to the final round. On the last matchday, Benfica hosted Porto in O Clássico, winning 6–0 and securing its second league title, becoming the first team to win back-to-back championships in league history.

After winning the league title, the team competed in the Campeonato de Portugal, facing Barreirense in the round of 16 and advancing to the quarter-finals thanks to a single goal from Alfredo Valadas in the first leg. In the next round, Benfica met Marítimo, winning 6–2 on aggregate and setting up another Lisbon derby in the semi-finals. A 3–2 home victory in the first leg, in which the team reached half-time with a three-goal lead, gave Benfica the advantage. However, a 4–2 defeat in the second match eliminated Benfica from the competition.

== Competitions ==
Win Draw Loss Postponed

=== Overall record ===
Competition	First match	Last match	Record								
Competition	First match	Last match	G	W	D	L	GF	GA	GD	Win %	Source
Campeonato da Liga	10 January 1937	2 May 1937	14	12	0	2	57	13	+44	85.71	
Campeonato de Portugal	16 May 1937	27 June 1937	6	4	1	1	12	8	+4	66.67	
Campeonato de Lisboa	11 October 1936	13 December 1936	10	5	3	2	26	14	+12	50.00	
Total			31	18	7	6	91	46	+45	58.06	

=== Primeira Divisão ===
==== League table ====
Pos	Team	Pld	W	D	L	GF	GA	GD	Pts
1	Benfica (C)	14	12	0	2	57	13	+44	24
2	Belenenses	14	11	1	2	46	17	+29	23
3	Sporting CP	14	9	2	3	54	25	+29	20
4	Porto	14	6	2	6	31	31	0	14
5	Académica	14	5	1	8	24	30	−6	11

(C) Champions

==== Results by round ====
Round	1	2	3	4	5	6	7	8	9	10	11	12	13	14
Ground	A	H	H	A	H	H	A	H	A	A	H	A	A	H
Result	W	W	W	W	W	W	W	L	W	W	W	W	L	W
Position	3	1	1	1	1	1	1	1	1	1	1	1	1	1

Source: ForaDeJogo
A = Away; H = Home; W = Win; D = Draw; L = Loss

==== Matches ====
10 January 1937 1	Vitória de Setúbal	1–2	Benfica	Setúbal
15:10	Silva 40'		43', 73' Espírito Santo	Stadium: Campo dos Arcos; Referee: Luiz da Câmara

24 January 1937 2	Benfica	5–1	Carcavelinhos	Lisbon
	Espírito Santo 29'; Sousa 37', 64'; Xavier 71'; Valadas 75'		42' Rodrigues	Stadium: Estádio das Amoreiras; Referee: António Palhinhas

31 January 1937 3	Benfica	10–2	Leixões	Lisbon
	Sousa 14' (pen.), 15' (pen.), 41', 62', 74'; Valadas 43', 47', 73'; Xavier 70'; Albino 90'		16' Mário; 29' (pen.) Moreira	Stadium: Estádio das Amoreiras; Referee: Eduardo Augusto

14 February 1937 4	Sporting	1–4	Benfica	Lisbon
	Mourão 40'		20' Espírito Santo; 21', 53' Sousa; 39' Valadas	Stadium: Estádio do Campo Grande; Referee: Henrique Rosa

21 February 1937 5	Benfica	2–1	Académica	Lisbon
	Lopes 22'; Sousa 43'		4' Nini	Stadium: Estádio do Campo Grande

28 February 1937 6	Benfica	2–0	Belenenses	Lisbon
	Espírito Santo 32'; Sousa 38'			Stadium: Estádio do Campo Grande

7 March 1937 7	Porto	2–1	Benfica	Porto
	Pinga 38'; Santos 65'		19' Espírito Santo	Stadium: Campo da Constituição; Referee: Henrique Rosa

14 March 1937 8	Benfica	8–1	Vitória de Setúbal	Lisbon
	Sousa 7', 62', 80'; Espírito Santo 11', 34'; Albino 55'; Valadas 68'; Lopes 72'		17' Rodrigues	Stadium: Estádio do Campo Grande

21 March 1937 9	Carcavelinhos	1–3	Benfica	Lisbon
	Rodrigues 51'		70' Xavier; 78', 86' Espírito Santo

4 April 1937 10	Leixões	0–6	Benfica	Matosinhos
			16', 84', 87' Sousa; 57', 65' Espírito Santo; 80' Valadas	Stadium: Campo da Santana

11 April 1937 11	Benfica	5–1	Sporting	Lisbon
	Espírito Santo 48', 73'; Sousa 55'; Valadas 72'; Xavier 81'		80' Pireza	Stadium: Estádio das Amoreiras; Referee: Gomes de Oliveira

18 April 1937 12	Académica	1–3	Benfica	Coimbra
	Gomes 25'		33', 82' Espírito Santo; 65' Valadas	Stadium: Campo de Santa Cruz; Referee: Manuel Ramos

25 April 1936 13	Belenenses	1–0	Benfica	Lisbon
15:00	Marques 30'			Stadium: Campo das Salésias; Referee: Manuel Ramos

2 May 1937 14	Benfica	6–0	Porto	Lisbon
	Santos 1' (o.g.); Valadas 25'; Espírito Santo 26'; Xavier 45'; Sousa 84'; Nova 88' (o.g.)			Stadium: Estádio das Amoreiras; Referee: Álvaro Santos

=== Taça de Portugal ===
==== Round of 16 ====
16 May 1937; First leg	Benfica	1–0	Barreirense	Lisbon
	Valadas 3'			Stadium: Estádio das Amoreiras; Referee: Manuel Silva I

23 May 1937; Second leg	Barreirense	0–0 (0–1 agg.)	Benfica	Lisbon
				Stadium: Stadium de Lisboa; Referee: Manuel de Oliveira

==== Quarter-Finals ====
30 May 1937; First leg	Marítimo	2–3	Benfica	Lisbon
	Leonel Alves 22', 40'		8' Albino; 37' Xavier; 82' Sousa	Stadium: Campo da Tapadinha; Referee: Manuel Marques I

6 June 1937; Second leg	Benfica	3–0 (5–2 agg.)	Marítimo	Lisbon
	Valadas 20' (pen.); Espírito Santo 40'; Xavier 57'			Stadium: Estádio das Amoreiras; Referee: Henrique Rosa

==== Semi-Finals ====
13 June 1937; First leg	Benfica	3–2	Sporting	Lisbon
	Espírito Santo 20'; Xavier 43'; Sousa 50'		70' Cruz; 79' Soeiro	Stadium: Estádio das Amoreiras; Referee: Álvaro Santos

27 June 1937; Second leg	Sporting	4–2 (6–5 agg.)	Benfica	Lisbon
	Pireza 34'; Galvão 47'; Mourão 64'; Cruz 67'		24' Sousa; 78' (pen.) Valadas; (red card) 80' Albino	Stadium: Estádio do Campo Grande; Referee: Manuel de Oliveira

=== Campeonato de Lisboa ===
Pos	Team	Pld	W	D	L	GF	GA	GD	Pts
1	Sporting (C)	10	6	2	2	31	9	+22	24
2	Benfica	10	5	3	2	26	14	+12	23
3	Carcavelinhos	10	5	2	3	19	18	+1	22
4	Belenenses	10	5	1	4	22	16	+6	21
5	Barreirense	10	4	1	5	12	22	−10	19
6	Casa Pia	10	0	1	9	7	38	−31	11

(C) Champions

11 October 1936 1	Casa Pia	0–0	Benfica	Lisbon
				Stadium: Campo do Restelo; Referee: António de Carvalho

18 October 1936 2	Benfica	0–5	Sporting	Lisbon
			18' Cruz; 26', 70' Soeiro; 75' Pireza; 88' Faustino	Stadium: Estádio das Amoreiras; Referee: José António Diniz

25 October 1936 3	Benfica	3–1	Belenenses	Lisbon
	Freire 21', 57'; Valadas 47'; Vieira (red card) 60'		83' Soares	Stadium: Estádio das Amoreiras; Referee: Carlos Canuto

1 November 1936 4	Barreirense	1–1	Benfica	Lisbon
	Piçarra 47'		10' Valadas	Stadium: Stadium de Lisboa; Referee: Manuel Silva I

8 November 1936 5	Benfica	6–0	Carcavelinhos	Lisbon
	Sousa 13', 58'; Cardoso 16', 57'; Freire 17', 30'			Stadium: Estádio das Amoreiras; Referee: António de Carvalho

15 November 1936 6	Benfica	7–0	Casa Pia	Lisbon
	Freire 5', 52', 83'; Valadas 49'; Xavier 65'; Sousa 74'; Albino 80'			Stadium: Estádio das Amoreiras; Referee: Octávio da Costa

22 November 1936 7	Sporting	1–1	Benfica	Lisbon
	Mendes 8'		84' Sousa	Stadium: Estádio do Campo Grande; Referee: Manuel Marques I

29 November 1936 8	Belenenses	3–4	Benfica	Lisbon
	Nova 10'; Correia 61'; Soares 74'		4', 30', 47' Sousa; 90' Gomes	Stadium: Stadium de Lisboa; Referee: Manuel Silva I

6 December 1936 9	Benfica	3–1	Barreirense	Lisbon
	Sousa 27', 51', 81'		82' (pen.) Alves	Stadium: Estádio das Amoreiras; Referee: Carlos Canuto

13 December 1936 10	Carcavelinhos	2–1	Benfica	Lisbon
	Pratas 35', 40'		22' Valadas	Stadium: Campo da Tapadinha; Referee: António de Carvalho

=== Non-Official matches ===
30 August 1936; Blitz Tournament	Benfica	1–2	Belenenses	Lisbon
	Cardoso 51'		6', 48' Rafael	Referee: Manuel da Silva

30 August 1936; Blitz Tournament	Benfica	0–0	Sporting	Lisbon
				Referee: Manuel da Silva

6 September 1936; Benfica-Belenenses Cup	Benfica	3–2	Belenenses	Lisbon

13 September 1936; Farewell to Vítor Silva	Benfica	2–1	Sporting	Lisbon
	Valadas 19'; Silva 40'		24' João Cruz	Stadium: Estádio das Amoreiras; Referee: Cândido de Oliveira

20 September 1936	Vitória de Setúbal	2–5	Benfica	Setúbal
	Figueiredo 22'; 80'		6', 50' Jesus; 20' Cardoso; 33' Valadas; Santos	Stadium: Campo dos Arcos

27 September 1936; B.S.B. Tournament	Benfica	1–4	Belenenses	Lisbon
	Sousa 55'		20', 60' Prefeito; 28' Preto; Rafael	Referee: José António Diniz

4 October 1936; B.S.B. Tournament	Benfica	1–2	Sporting	Lisbon

5 October 1936; Vasco Ribeiro Cup	Benfica	0–0	Barreirense	Lisbon
				Referee: Manuel da Silva

1 December 1936	Benfica	4–2	União de Lisboa	Lisbon
	Espirito Santo 29', 78', 80'; Rogério 47'		31' Guedes; 71' Silva	Referee: Cláudio Nunes

20 December 1936	Benfica	5–1	Porto	Lisbon
	Rogério 55', 68', 78'; Espírito Santo 62', 77'			Stadium: Estádio das Amoreiras; Referee: Horácio Cunha

25 December 1936	Porto	3–3	Benfica	Porto
	Santos 16', 85'		33' (o.g.) Romão; Valadas	Stadium: Campo do Ameal

27 December 1936	Braga	2–5	Benfica	Braga
	Argentino; Mica		Valadas; Rogério; Freire	Stadium: Campo do Ameal

3 January 1937	Benfica	1–1	FK Austria Wien	Lisbon
	Valadas 7'		5'	Stadium: Estádio das Amoreiras; Referee: Carlos Canuta

26 March 1937; Easter Cup	Benfica	2–1	Porto	Lisbon
	Sousa 31'; Espírito Santo 44'		16' Santos	Stadium: Estádio do Campo Grande; Referee: José António Diniz

28 March 1937; Easter Cup	Sporting	1–2 (a.e.t)	Benfica	Lisbon
	Pireza 27'		73' Albino; 94' Freire	Stadium: Estádio do Campo Grande; Referee: Manuel Marques

6 May 1937	SL Cartaxo	1–10	Benfica	Cartaxo
				Stadium: Campo das Pratas

== Player statistics ==
The squad for the season consisted of the players listed in the tables below, as well as staff member Lippo Hertzka (manager).

Note 1: Note: Flags indicate national team as defined under FIFA eligibility rules. Players may hold more than one non-FIFA nationality.

Note 2: Players with squad numbers marked ‡ joined the club during the 1936-37 season via transfer, with more details in the following section.

No.	Pos	Nat	Player	Total		Campeonato da Liga		Campeonato de Portugal		Campeonato de Lisboa	
No.	Pos	Nat	Player	Apps	Goals	Apps	Goals	Apps	Goals	Apps	Goals
1	GK	(Portugal) POR	Augusto Amaro	6	0	4	0	0	0	2	0
1	GK	(Portugal) POR	Cândido Tavares	24	0	10	0	6	0	8	0
	DF	(Portugal) POR	João Correia	4	0	2	0	0	0	2	0
	DF	(Portugal) POR	Ricardo Freire	8	7	0	0	0	0	8	7
2	DF	(Portugal) POR	António Vieira	25	0	13	0	6	0	6	0
3	DF	(Portugal) POR	Gustavo Teixeira	27	0	13	0	6	0	8	0
	MF	(Portugal) POR	Francisco Costa	9	0	2	0	0	0	7	0
	MF	(Portugal) POR	Joaquim Alcobia	24	0	11	0	4	0	9	0
4	MF	(Portugal) POR	Raul Baptista	25	0	13	0	4	0	8	0
5	MF	(Portugal) POR	Francisco Albino	29	4	13	2	6	1	10	1
6	MF	(Portugal) POR	Gaspar Pinto	25	0	12	0	4	0	9	0
7	MF	(Portugal) POR	Domingos Lopes	23	2	12	2	4	0	7	0
	FW	(Portugal) POR	Alberto Cardoso	4	2	0	0	0	0	4	2
	FW	(Portugal) POR	Alberto de Jesus	2	0	0	0	0	0	2	0
	FW	(Portugal) POR	Carlos Torres	5	0	0	0	2	0	3	0
	FW	(Portugal) POR	José Gomes	3	1	0	0	1	0	2	1
	FW	(Portugal) POR	Vítor Silva	0	0	0	0	0	0	0	0
8	FW	(Portugal) POR	Rogério Sousa	30	32	14	19	6	3	10	10
9	FW	(Portugal) POR	Guilherme Espírito Santo	21	19	14	17	6	2	1	0
10	FW	(Portugal) POR	Luís Xavier	23	9	14	5	5	3	4	1
11	FW	(Portugal) POR	Alfredo Valadas	29	17	14	10	6	3	9	4

== Transfers ==
=== In ===
Position	Player	From	Fee	Ref
DF	António Vieira	Vitória de Setúbal	Undisclosed	
MF	Joaquim Alcobia	Sporting	Undisclosed	
FW	Espírito Santo	Benfica de Luanda	Undisclosed	
FW	José Gomes	Luso FC	Undisclosed	

=== Out ===
Position	Player	To	Fee	Ref
DF	Francisco Gatinho	C.F. Os Belenenses	Undisclosed	
FW	Guedes Gonçalves	U.D. Leiria	Undisclosed	
