= 1937–38 S.L. Benfica season =

Benfica
1937–38 season
- President: Manuel da Conceição Afonso
- Head coach: Lippo Hertzka
- Stadium: Estádio da Luz
- Primeira Divisão: 1st
- Campeonato de Portugal: Runners-up
- Campeonato de Lisboa: 2nd
- Top goalscorer: League: Espírito Santo (12); All: Espírito Santo (35)
- Biggest win: Benfica 13–1 Casa Pia (5 December 1937)
- Biggest defeat: Porto 4–2 Benfica (29 May 1938); Sporting 3–1 Benfica (26 June 1938)
Home colours	Away colours

The 1937–38 season was Sport Lisboa e Benfica's 34th season in existence and the club's 4rd consecutive season in the top flight of Portuguese football, covering the period from 1 September 1937 to 30 June 1938. Benfica competed in the Campeonato da Liga, the Campeonato de Portugal and in the Campeonato de Lisboa.

Benfica entered the season aiming to defend its league title while also competing for the Campeonato de Portugal and the Campeonato de Lisboa. After finishing runners-up in the regional competition, the club went on to win its third consecutive Campeonato da Liga title, the first team in Portugal to achieve such a feat. In the Campeonato de Portugal, Benfica reached the final after eliminating Porto and Académica, but lost to Sporting in the fifth Derby de Lisboa of the season, narrowly missing out on the double.

== Season summary ==
Benfica entered the season seeking to defend the league title it had secured the previous year, as well as to win the Campeonato de Portugal and the Campeonato de Lisboa. After guiding the team to consecutive league titles, Hungarian coach Lippo Hertzka remained in charge for a second season. During the off-season, Cândido Tavares left for Casa Pia, and Alberto de Jesus departed to join Belenenses. The club brought in Pedro Ferreira from Sporting.

Before the start of the Campeonato de Lisboa, Benfica played six friendlies, recording four wins and two losses. Five of these matches were against rivals Belenenses, Sporting, and Porto, including a 4–1 victory over Sporting and a 6–0 win against Belenenses.

On 17 October, Benfica visited União de Lisboa in the opening round of the Campeonato de Lisboa, winning 8–0. The team won its next two matches, scoring six goals across both, before travelling to face Belenenses, where it won 3–2 and remained level on points with Sporting at the top of the table. On 14 November, Benfica visited Sporting in the Derby de Lisboa, losing 1–0 and dropping to second place. Benfica closed the month with a 5–4 win over União de Lisboa, overcoming a four-goal deficit by the 49th minute.

Benfica began December with a 13–1 victory over Casa Pia, in which Guilherme Espírito Santo scored nine goals. Before hosting Sporting, the team defeated Belenenses 5–2. On 19 December, Benfica faced Sporting in a match that would decide the title, with the Derby ending in a 2–2 draw, giving Sporting the championship.

Before the beginning of the Campeonato da Liga, the team hosted MTK Budapest FC in a rare international match, losing 4–0. Benfica began its title defence with a 4–0 away win over Académico F.C.. In the following round, the team hosted Sporting in the season’s first league Derby de Lisboa, winning 3–2 with Rogério scoring twice and Espírito Santo adding the decisive goal.

February opened with a goalless draw against Barreirense, dropping the team to third place, three points behind leaders Porto. Benfica then recorded a 4–1 away win over Carcavelinhos, followed by a 3–1 victory against Porto in the first O Clássico of the season, climbing to first place. However, a loss to Belenenses in the following matchday saw Benfica fall back to second place. The team won its next two matches before meeting Sporting for the fourth time that season and drawing 2–2, a result that left Benfica two points behind Porto.

With two further wins over Barreirense and Carcavelinhos, combined with a Porto defeat, Benfica drew level on points with its rival. On 10 April, a 2–2 away draw with Porto in a decisive O Clássico gave Benfica the head-to-head advantage going into the final two matches of the season. Victories over Belenenses and Académica secured Benfica’s third consecutive league title, making it the first club in Portugal to achieve the feat.

After the conclusion of the league, Benfica entered the Campeonato de Portugal, defeating União de Lisboa 4–1 on aggregate in the round of 16, setting up a O Clássico quarter-final against Porto. In the first leg, Benfica lost 4–2 away after conceding twice in the second half. The second leg ended in a 7–0 victory, with five first-half goals and a hat-trick from Espírito Santo, sending the team into the semi-finals. In the semi-finals, Benfica lost the first leg 2–1, but a 4–1 win over Académica in the return leg secured a place in the final. In the fifth Derby de Lisboa of the season, Benfica faced Sporting and lost 3–1, missing the chance to achieve a double.

== Competitions ==
Win Draw Loss Postponed

=== Overall record ===
Competition	First match	Last match	Record								
Competition	First match	Last match	G	W	D	L	GF	GA	GD	Win %	Source
Campeonato da Liga	16 January 1938	8 May 1938	14	10	3	1	34	16	+18	71.43	
Campeonato de Portugal	15 May 1938	26 June 1938	7	3	1	3	19	11	+8	42.86	
Campeonato de Lisboa	17 October 1937	19 December 1937	10	7	2	1	42	14	+28	70.00	
Total			31	20	6	5	95	41	+54	64.52	

=== Primeira Divisão ===
==== League table ====
Pos	Team	Pld	W	D	L	GF	GA	GD	Pts
1	Benfica (C)	14	10	3	1	34	16	+18	23
2	Porto	14	11	1	2	43	22	+21	23
3	Sporting CP	14	10	2	2	67	23	+44	22
4	Carcavelinhos	14	5	1	8	18	36	−18	11
5	Belenenses	14	5	0	9	29	28	+1	10

(C) Champions

==== Results by round ====
Round	1	2	3	4	5	6	7	8	9	10	11	12	13	14
Ground	A	H	H	A	H	A	A	H	A	A	H	A	H	H
Result	W	W	D	W	W	L	W	W	D	W	W	D	W	W
Position	2	1	3	2	1	2	2	2	2	1	1	1	1	1

Source: ForaDeJogo
A = Away; H = Home; W = Win; D = Draw; L = Loss

==== Matches ====
16 January 1938 1	Académico F.C.	0–4	Benfica	Porto
			1', 65' Valadas; 75' Rogério; 85' Espírito Santo	Stadium: Estádio do Lima; Referee: Álvaro Santos

23 January 1938 2	Benfica	3–2	Sporting	Lisbon
	Rogério 28', 41'; Espírito Santo 64'		6', 70' Peyroteo	Stadium: Estádio das Amoreiras; Referee: Abel Ferreira

6 February 1938 3	Benfica	0–0	Barreirense	Lisbon
				Stadium: Estádio das Amoreiras

13 February 1938 4	Carcavelinhos	1–4	Benfica	Lisbon
	Pratas 40'		31', 85' Sousa; 46' Valadas; 75' Espírito Santo

20 February 1938 5	Benfica	3–1	Porto	Lisbon
	Rogério 47'; Espírito Santo 70'; Valadas 72'		40' Costuras	Stadium: Estádio das Amoreiras; Referee: Cunha Pinto

27 February 1938 6	Belenenses	2–1	Benfica	Lisbon
	José Luis 30', 40'		78' Rogério

6 March 1938 7	Académica	1–2	Benfica	Coimbra
	Cunha 41'		5' Espírito Santo; 42' Lopes

13 March 1938 8	Benfica	3–0	Académico	Lisbon
	Valadas 47', 70'; Barbosa 50'			Stadium: Estádio do Campo Grande

20 March 1938 9	Sporting	2–2	Benfica	Lisbon
	Peyroteo 15', 79'		20' Lopes; 68' Xavier	Stadium: Stadium de Lisboa

27 March 1937 10	Barreirense	1–2	Benfica	Barreiro
	Rodrigues 80'		23' Espírito Santo; 32' Valadas

3 April 1938 11	Benfica	3–2	Carcavelinhos	Lisbon
	Valadas 25'; Albino 53' (pen.); Xavier 57'		7' Pratas; 62' Quirino	Stadium: Estádio das Amoreiras

10 April 1938 12	Porto	2–2	Benfica	Porto
	Costuras 22'; Silva 52'		46' Rogério; 64' Valadas	Stadium: Estádio do Lima

17 April 1938 13	Benfica	1–0	Belenenses	Lisbon
	Rogério 61', 70'		58' Jesus	Stadium: Estádio das Amoreiras

8 May 1938 14	Benfica	3–1	Académica	Lisbon
	Xavier 50'; Rogério 54', 60'		65' Nini; (red card) Antunes	Stadium: Estádio das Amoreiras

=== Taça de Portugal ===
==== Round of 16 ====
15 May 1938; First leg	Benfica	3–0	União de Lisboa	Lisbon
	Barbosa 23'; Valadas 58'; Espírito Santo 76'			Stadium: Estádio das Amoreiras; Referee: Cunha Pinto

22 May 1938; Second leg	União de Lisboa	1–1 (1–4 agg.)	Benfica	Lisbon
	Machado 54'		46' Albino	Stadium: Campo do Santo Amaro; Referee: António Palhinhas

==== Quarter-Finals ====
29 May 1938; First leg	Porto	4–2	Benfica	Porto
	Pinga 17'; Nunes 20'; Costuras 40', 51'		23' Rogério; 34' Espírito Santo	Stadium: Campo do Ameal; Referee: Álvaro Santos

5 June 1938; Second leg	Benfica	7–0 (9–4 agg.)	Porto	Lisbon
	Valadas 5'; Lopes 17'; Xavier 22', 28'; Espírito Santo 26', 50', 63'		(red card) 75' Nunes; (red card) 77' Silva	Stadium: Estádio das Amoreiras; Referee: Cunha Pinto

==== Semi-Finals ====
12 June 1938; First leg	Académica	2–1	Benfica	Coimbra
	Oliveira 55'; Vieira 75' (o.g.)		56' Espírito Santo	Stadium: Campo de Santa Cruz; Referee: Santos Palma

19 June 1938; Second leg	Benfica	4–1 (5–3 agg.)	Académica	Lisbon
	Espírito Santo 3', 27'; Barbosa 49'; Valadas 53'		60' Gomes	Stadium: Estádio das Amoreiras; Referee: Eduardo Augusto

==== Final ====
26 June 1938	Sporting	3–1	Benfica	Lisbon
	Mourão 12'; Soeiro 15', 54'		70' (pen.) Valadas	Stadium: Stadium de Lisboa; Referee: Abel Ferreira

=== Campeonato de Lisboa ===
Pos	Team	Pld	W	D	L	GF	GA	GD	Pts
1	Sporting (C)	10	9	1	0	44	11	+33	29
2	Benfica	10	7	2	1	42	14	+28	26
3	Belenenses	10	5	1	4	34	22	+12	21
4	Carcavelinhos	10	3	1	6	15	26	−11	17
5	União de Lisboa	10	2	2	6	19	35	−16	16
6	Casa Pia	10	0	1	9	13	59	−46	11

(C) Champions

17 October 1937 1	União de Lisboa	0–8	Benfica	Lisbon
			12', 78', 83' Rogério; 15', 50', 63' Espírito Santo; 22' Albino; 88' Lopes	Stadium: Campo de Santo Amaro; Referee: Claudino Nunes

24 October 1937 2	Benfica	2–1	Carcavelinhos	Lisbon
	Valadas 65', 70'		87' França	Stadium: Estádio das Amoreiras; Referee: Abel Ferreira

31 October 1937 3	Casa Pia	1–4	Benfica	Lisbon
	Marques 82'		31', 87', 90' Espírito Santo; 53' Xavier	Stadium: Campo do Restelo; Referee: José António Diniz

7 November 1937 4	Belenenses	2–3	Benfica	Lisbon
	Alberto de Jesus 36', 90'		69', 80' Espírito Santo; 78' Rogério	Stadium: Estádio José Manuel Soares; Referee: Claudino Nunes

14 November 1937 5	Sporting	1–0	Benfica	Lisbon
	Peyroteo 27'			Stadium: Stadium de Lisboa; Referee: António Ferreira

21 November 1937 6	Benfica	5–4	União de Lisboa	Lisbon
	Espírito Santo 52'; Rogério 67', 70'; Valadas 77'; Xavier 89'		2', 49' Salvaterra; 37' Machado; 44' Casimiro	Stadium: Estádio das Amoreiras; Referee: João Vaz

1 December 1937 8	Carcavelinhos	0–0	Benfica	Lisbon
				Stadium: Estádio da Tapadinha; Referee: Armelim Martins

5 December 1937 7	Benfica	13–1	Casa Pia	Lisbon
	Espírito Santo 37', 39', 48', 50', 60', 81', 82', 83', 89'; Rogério 49'; Baptista 66'; Oliveira 69', 76'		6' António da Luísa	Stadium: Estádio das Amoreiras; Referee: Carlos Canuto

12 December 1937 9	Benfica	5–2	Belenenses	Lisbon
	Rogério 4', 40', 62'; Espírito Santo 16', 51'		9', 76' Jesus	Stadium: Estádio das Amoreiras; Referee: Abel Ferreira

19 December 1937 10	Benfica	2–2	Sporting	Lisbon
	Espírito Santo 8'; Rogério 22'		51', 71' Peyroteo	Stadium: Estádio das Amoreiras; Referee: Claudino Nunes

=== Non-Official matches ===
12 September 1937; B.S.B. Tournament	Benfica	3–5	Sporting	Lisbon
	Valadas 21'; Espírito Santo 84'		28' Peyroteo; 31' Nunes; Paciência; 78' Cruz; Mourão	Stadium: Campo das Salésias; Referee: Manuel da Silva

19 September 1937; B.S.B. Tournament	Benfica	3–2	Belenenses	Lisbon
	Espírito Santo 23' Valadas 67', 81'		16' Carneiro; 66' Perfeito	Stadium: Campo das Salésias; Referee: José António Diniz

23 September 1937	Benfica	4–1	Sporting	Elvas
				Stadium: Estádio Municipal de Elvas

3 October 1937	Académico F.C.	2–3	Benfica	Porto
	Quecas 41'		13' Espírito Santo; 26' Oliveira	Stadium: Estádio do Lima

5 October 1937	Porto	4–3	Benfica	Porto
				Stadium: Estádio do Lima

10 October 1937; Benfica-Belenenses Cup	Belenenses	0–6	Benfica	Lisbon
			18' Teixeira; 27', 33' Espírito Santo; 49' Barbosa; 60', 68' Valadas	Stadium: Campo das Salésias; Referee: Aurélio Peixoto de Carvalho

26 December 1937	Benfica	0–4	MTK Budapest FC	Lisbon
			6' Faff; 17' Kaldos; 36' Budas; 80' Kalmar	Stadium: Estádio das Amoreiras; Referee: José António Diniz

1 May 1938	Benfica	7–1	Luso FC	Lisbon
	Xavier 25', 35'; Freire 38', 78', 80'; Duarte 81', 89'		6' Covas	Stadium: Estádio das Amoreiras

== Player statistics ==
The squad for the season consisted of the players listed in the tables below, as well as staff member Lippo Hertzka (manager).

Note 1: Note: Flags indicate national team as defined under FIFA eligibility rules. Players may hold more than one non-FIFA nationality.

Note 2: Players with squad numbers marked ‡ joined the club during the 1937-38 season via transfer, with more details in the following section.

No.	Pos	Nat	Player	Total		Campeonato da Liga		Campeonato de Portugal		Campeonato de Lisboa	
No.	Pos	Nat	Player	Apps	Goals	Apps	Goals	Apps	Goals	Apps	Goals
1	GK	(Portugal) POR	Augusto Amaro	30	0	13	0	7	0	10	0
1	GK	(Portugal) POR	Mário da Rosa	1	0	1	0	0	0	0	0
	DF	(Portugal) POR	Luiz Rodrigues	1	0	1	0	0	0	0	0
	DF	(Portugal) POR	Ricardo Freire	1	0	0	0	1	0	0	0
2	DF	(Portugal) POR	António Vieira	24	0	12	0	7	0	5	0
3	DF	(Portugal) POR	Gustavo Teixeira	29	0	12	0	7	0	10	0
	MF	(Portugal) POR	Alberto Cardoso	6	0	4	0	1	0	1	0
	MF	(Portugal) POR	Francisco Costa	9	0	3	0	1	0	5	0
	MF	(Portugal) POR	Pedro Ferreira	0	0	0	0	0	0	0	0
4	MF	(Portugal) POR	João Correia	4	0	0	0	3	0	1	0
4	MF	(Portugal) POR	Raul Baptista	28	1	14	0	4	0	10	1
5	MF	(Portugal) POR	Francisco Albino	31	3	14	1	7	1	10	1
6	MF	(Portugal) POR	Gaspar Pinto	30	0	14	0	6	0	10	0
6	MF	(Portugal) POR	Joaquim Alcobia	0	0	0	0	0	0	0	0
7	MF	(Portugal) POR	Domingos Lopes	20	4	10	2	6	1	4	1
8	MF	(Portugal) POR	Feliciano Barbosa	10	3	2	1	5	2	3	0
	FW	(Portugal) POR	António Navalhas	1	0	0	0	0	0	1	0
	FW	(Portugal) POR	Eduardo Oliveira	1	2	0	0	0	0	1	2
	FW	(Portugal) POR	José Gomes	3	0	0	0	0	0	3	0
8	FW	(Portugal) POR	Rogério Sousa	24	24	12	12	2	1	10	11
9	FW	(Portugal) POR	Guilherme Espírito Santo	30	35	14	6	6	8	10	21
10	FW	(Portugal) POR	Luís Xavier	29	7	14	3	7	2	8	2
11	FW	(Portugal) POR	Alfredo Valadas	29	16	14	9	7	4	8	3

== Transfers ==
=== In ===
Position	Player	From	Fee	Ref
MF	Pedro Ferreira	Sporting CP	Undisclosed	

=== Out ===
Position	Player	To	Fee	Ref
GK	Cândido Tavares	Casa Pia A.C.	Undisclosed	
MF	Jacinto Esperança	Lusitânia Reguengos de Monsaraz	Undisclosed	
FW	Alberto de Jesus	CF Os Belenenses	Undisclosed	
