= 1935–36 S.L. Benfica season =

Benfica
1935–36 season
- President: Vasco Rosa Ribeiro
- Head coach: Vítor Gonçalves
- Stadium: Estádio das Amoreiras
- Primeira Divisão: 1st
- Campeonato de Portugal: Semi-Final
- Campeonato de Lisboa: 2nd
- Top goalscorer: League: Alfredo Valadas (12); All: Alfredo Valadas (24)
- Biggest win: Benfica 10–1 União de Lisboa (3 November 1935)
- Biggest defeat: Sporting 4–1 Benfica (12 February 1936)
Home colours	Away colours

The 1935–36 season was Sport Lisboa e Benfica's 32nd season in existence and the club's 2nd consecutive season in the top flight of Portuguese football, covering the period from 1 September 1935 to 30 July 1936. Benfica competed in the Campeonato da Liga and in the Campeonato de Portugal.

Benfica entered the season aiming to win its first league title while defending the Campeonato de Portugal and reclaiming the Campeonato de Lisboa. Under manager Vítor Gonçalves, the team performed strongly throughout the regional and national competitions, ultimately winning the Campeonato da Liga after a decisive victory over Sporting in April. In the Campeonato de Portugal, Benfica reached the semi-finals but were eliminated by Belenenses, falling short of securing what would have been the first national double.

== Season summary ==
Benfica entered the season seeking to win its first league title, defend the Campeonato de Portugal title it had secured the previous year, and reclaim the Campeonato de Lisboa. Manager Vítor Gonçalves remained in charge for his second season. During the off-season, Cândido Tavares and Raul Baptista joined the squad, while Tamanqueiro left the club.

Before beginning the Campeonato de Lisboa, Benfica played six preparation matches, recording four wins, one draw and one loss. Five of these games were against local opponents Belenenses, and Sporting.

On 13 October, Benfica hosted Sporting in the Derby de Lisboa in the opening round of the Campeonato de Lisboa, winning 4–0 with Vítor Silva scoring twice. One week later, the team hosted Belenenses and scored two goals in the first four minutes to take a two-goal lead into half-time, but three second-half goals from the visitors handed Benfica their first defeat of the competition. The team responded with three consecutive victories, scoring 15 goals and remaining in first place, level on points with Sporting.

On 17 November, Benfica visited Sporting in another edition of the Derby de Lisboa, winning 2–1 with a decisive goal from Domingos Lopes that opened a two-point lead at the top of the table. The team then travelled to face Belenenses, winning 2–1 after overturning the score with two second-half goals. This result was followed by two further victories and a defeat to União de Lisboa, leaving Benfica and Sporting tied on points at the end of the competition in December and requiring a decisive playoff match.

On 12 January, the team hosted Vitória de Setúbal in the opening matchday of the Campeonato da Liga, winning 5–3. Benfica then faced three decisive fixtures: first, a 2–1 defeat to Belenenses, followed by a 2–2 away draw with Porto in O Clássico, and a 4–1 loss to Sporting in the decisive final of the Campeonato de Lisboa. The team closed the month with a 6–2 away victory over Académica, finishing January in second place, two points behind Sporting.

Benfica began March with a 4–2 away victory over Sporting, climbing to first place in the table, and followed this result with two further wins. The team closed the month with consecutive draws against Vitória de Setúbal and Belenenses, but still finished March one point ahead of Sporting.

The decisive month began with a 5–1 win over Porto, followed by a goalless draw with Carcavelinhos, which left Benfica level on points with Sporting. The team then defeated Académica, and on 26 April, in a decisive Derby de Lisboa, Benfica beat Sporting 3–1, securing the league title. In the final match of the campaign, the team visited Boavista, drawing 2–2.

After the end of the league, the team competed in the Campeonato de Portugal, aiming to become the first club to achieve a national double. In the round of 16, Benfica won 7–1 on aggregate against União de Lisboa, advancing to the quarter-finals to face Vitória de Setúbal. In the first leg, the team lost 1–0 away, but a 3–1 win in the second leg, with a hat-trick from Vítor Silva, qualified the team for the semi-finals. In the semi-finals, Benfica drew 2–2 at home against Belenenses, but a 2–1 defeat in the away leg eliminated the team from the competition.

== Competitions ==
Win Draw Loss Postponed

=== Overall record ===
Competition	First match	Last match	Record								
Competition	First match	Last match	G	W	D	L	GF	GA	GD	Win %	Source
Campeonato da Liga	12 January 1936	3 May 1936	14	8	5	1	44	23	+21	57.14	
Campeonato de Portugal	24 May 1936	28 June 1936	6	2	2	2	13	7	+6	33.33	
Campeonato de Lisboa	13 October 1935	12 February 1936	11	8	0	3	34	16	+18	72.73	
Total			31	18	7	6	91	46	+45	58.06	

=== Primeira Divisão ===
==== League table ====
Pos	Team	Pld	W	D	L	GF	GA	GD	Pts
1	Benfica (C)	14	8	5	1	44	23	+21	21
2	Porto	14	9	2	3	50	18	+32	20
3	Sporting CP	14	8	2	4	41	31	+10	18
4	Belenenses	14	7	3	4	28	22	+6	17
5	Vitória de Setúbal	14	7	2	5	32	26	+6	16

Source: rsssf.com
(C) Champions

==== Results by round ====
Round	1	2	3	4	5	6	7	8	9	10	11	12	13	14
Ground	H	A	A	H	A	A	H	A	H	H	A	H	H	A
Result	W	L	D	W	W	W	W	D	D	W	D	W	W	D
Position	1	3	4	2	2	2	1	1	1	1	1	1	1	1

Source: ForaDeJogo
A = Away; H = Home; W = Win; D = Draw; L = Loss

==== Matches ====
12 January 1936 1	Benfica	5–3	Vitória de Setúbal	Lisbon
	Xavier 29'; Lopes 48'; Gonçalves 67', 68'; Silva 80'			Stadium: Estádio das Amoreiras; Referee: Santos Palma

19 January 1936 2	Belenenses	3–1	Benfica	Lisbon
	Marques 8'; José Luís 18'; Rodrigues 78'		29' Torres	Stadium: Campo das Salésias; Referee: Carlos Canuto

2 February 1936 3	Porto	2–2	Benfica	Porto
	Castro 22'; Pinga 43' (pen.)		7' Silva; 15' Luís Xavier	Stadium: Campo do Ameal; Referee: Natividade Silva

16 February 1936 5	Académica	2–6	Benfica	Coimbra
	Maia 50', 76'		5', 24', 31', 57' Valadas; 29' Lopes; 65' Sousa	Stadium: Campo de Santa Cruz; Referee: Alírio Moureiro

1 March 1936 6	Sporting	2–4	Benfica	Lisbon
	Mourão 45'; Soeiro 76'		41' (o.g.) Silva; 43', 89' Valadas; 55' Silva	Stadium: Estádio do Campo Grande; Referee: David Costa

8 March 1936 7	Benfica	8–2	Boavista	Lisbon
	Xavier 22'; Sousa 23'; Silva 25', 55'; Torres 40', 66'; Valadas 61', 73' (pen.)		53' Nel; 67' Peseta	Stadium: Estádio das Amoreiras; Referee: Álvaro Rodrigues

15 March 1936 4	Benfica	2–1	Carcavelinhos	Lisbon
15:00	Cardoso 21'; Silva 26' (red card) 85'		19' Oliveira e Silva; (red card) 85' Vergilésio; (red card) Esteves	Stadium: Estádio das Amoreiras; Referee: Francisco Santos

22 March 1936 8	Benfica	3–3	Vitória de Setúbal	Setúbal
	Silva 20'; Cruz 55'; Silva 81'		7' Xavier; 37' (o.g.) Rendas; 65' Torres	Stadium: Campo dos Arcos; Referee: Gomes de Oliveira

29 March 1936 9	Benfica	0–0	Belenenses	Lisbon
				Stadium: Estádio das Amoreiras; Referee: Clemente Guerra

5 April 1936 10	Benfica	5–1	Porto	Lisbon
	Torres 12', 30' (pen.); Silva 14', 25'; Xavier 87'			Stadium: Estádio das Amoreiras; Referee: Santos Palma

12 April 1936 11	Carcavelinhos	0–0	Benfica	Lisbon
				Stadium: Estádio da Tapadinha; Referee: Cunha Pinto

19 April 1936 12	Benfica	3–1	Académica	Lisbon
	Torres 14', 30'; Valadas 47'		16' Pimenta	Stadium: Estádio das Amoreiras; Referee: Henrique Rosa

26 April 1936 13	Benfica	3–1	Sporting	Lisbon
15:00	Valadas 32', 55', 62'		59' Lopes	Stadium: Estádio das Amoreiras; Referee: Gomes de Oliveira

3 May 1936 14	Boavista	2–2	Benfica	Porto
	Costuras 25'; Adérito 55'		15' (pen.) Carlos Torres; Xavier 60'	Stadium: Estádio do Lima; Referee: Santos Palma

=== Taça de Portugal ===
==== Round of 16 ====
24 May 1936	Benfica	6–0	União de Lisboa	Lisbon
	Valadas 8', 84'; Torres 25' (pen.); Xavier 48', 62'; Lopes 76'			Stadium: Estádio da Luz; Referee: Manuel Silva I

31 May 1936	União de Lisboa	1–1 (1–7 agg.)	Benfica	Lisbon
	Machado 27'		83' Cardoso	Stadium: Campo de Santo Amaro; Referee: António de Carvalho

==== Quarter-Finals ====
7 June 1936	Vitória de Setúbal	1–0	Benfica	Setúbal
	Rodrigues 40'			Stadium: Campo dos Arcos; Referee: Santos Palma

14 June 1936	Benfica	3–1 (3–2 agg.)	Vitória de Setúbal	Lisbon
	Vítor Silva 17', 46', 61'		28' (red card) 77' Pité	Stadium: Estádio das Amoreiras; Referee: Álvaro Santos

==== Semi-Finals ====
21 June 1936	Benfica	2–2	Belenenses	Lisbon
17:40	Vítor Silva 2'; Lopes 19'		25' Viegas; 54' Correia	Stadium: Estádio das Amoreiras; Referee: Gomes de Oliveira

28 June 1936	Belenenses	2–1 (4–3 agg.)	Benfica	Lisbon
	Correia 12'; Viegas 55'		73' Valadas	Stadium: Campo das Salésias; Referee: Santos Palma

=== Campeonato de Lisboa ===
Pos	Team	Pld	W	D	L	GF	GA	GD	Pts
1	Sporting	10	8	0	2	36	11	+25	26
2	Benfica	10	8	0	2	33	12	+21	26
3	Belenenses	10	4	2	4	19	13	+6	20
4	Carcavelinhos	10	4	0	6	12	16	−4	18
5	Barreirense	10	3	2	5	12	26	−14	18
6	União de Lisboa	10	1	0	9	7	41	−34	12

13 October 1935 1	Benfica	4–0	Sporting	Lisbon
	Lopes 31'; Valadas 55'; Silva 58', 62'			Stadium: Estádio do Campo Grande; Referee: Manuel Silva I

20 October 1935 2	Benfica	2–3	Belenenses	Lisbon
	Sousa 2'; Lopes 4'		26' (pen.) Fernandes; 48' Marques; 60' Soares	Stadium: Estádio das Amoreiras; Referee: Moisés Cruz

27 October 1935 3	Barreirense	1–2	Benfica	Lisbon
	Câmara 37'		70' (o.g.) Alves; 88' Valadas	Stadium: Stadium de Lisboa; Referee: José António Diniz

3 November 1935 4	Benfica	10–1	União de Lisboa	Lisbon
	Valadas 6', 33', 73'; Lopes 7'; Cardoso 22'; Torres 24' (pen.); Albino 40'; Silva 63', 65', 85'		49' Estrela	Stadium: Estádio das Amoreiras; Referee: Manuel Marques I

10 November 1935 5	Benfica	3–1	Carcavelinhos	Lisbon
	Valadas 2', 78'; Lopes 23'		69' Rodrigues	Stadium: Estádio das Amoreiras; Referee: António de Carvalho

17 November 1935 6	Sporting	1–2	Benfica	Lisbon
	Possak 20'; Fernando (red card); Lopes II (red card)		37' Valadas; Lopes; Correia (red card)	Stadium: Estádio das Amoreiras; Referee: Américo Gomes

24 November 1935 7	Belenenses	1–2	Benfica	Lisbon
	Amaro 30'		64' Cardoso; 80' Sousa	Stadium: Estádio das Amoreiras; Referee: Clemente Guerra

1 December 1935 8	Benfica	6–1	Barreirense	Lisbon
	Sousa 6'; Valadas 36'; Albino 47'; Cardoso 50'; Xavier 63', 75'		35' Campos	Stadium: Estádio das Amoreiras; Referee: Américo Gomes

8 December 1935 9	União de Lisboa	3–1	Benfica	Lisbon
	Artur Silva 35', 67'; Rodrigues 58'		81' Sousa	Stadium: Campo de Santo Amaro; Referee: Francisco Santos

15 December 1935 10	Carcavelinhos	0–1	Benfica	Lisbon
			62' Lopes	Stadium: Estádio da Tapadinha; Referee: Américo Gomes

==== Final ====
12 February 1935	Sporting	4–1	Benfica	Lisbon
	Soeiro 28'; Lopes 66', 90'; Carneiro 79'		70' Silva	Stadium: Estádio do Campo Grande; Referee: António de Carvalho

As Benfica and Sporting were tied on points, the title was decide in a match between both clubs.

=== Non-Official matches ===
8 September 1935; Blitz Tournament	Benfica	2–0	Belenenses	Lisbon
	Xavier; Torres			Stadium: Stadium de Lisboa; Referee: Manuel da Silva

8 September 1935; Blitz Tournament	Benfica	0–0	Sporting	Lisbon
				Stadium: Stadium de Lisboa; Referee: Carlos Lopes

15 September 1935; B.S.B. Tournament	Benfica	5–4	Belenenses	Lisbon
	Xavier 2', 19'; Rogério 21'; Lopes 34'; Valadas 60'		25' Luiz; Bernardo 56'; Pereira 61', 89'	Stadium: Estádio do Campo Grande; Referee: Manuel da Silva

22 September 1935	Benfica	7–2	Carcavelinhos	Lisbon
	Silva 10', 70', 81'; Lopes; Torres; Xavier 49', 71'		2', 35' Quirino	Stadium: Estádio da Luz; Referee: Armelim Nunes

29 September 1935; B.S.B. Tournament	Benfica	2–5	Sporting	Lisbon
	Xavier; Lopes 67'		2' Soeiro; 55' Possak (o.g.) Correira; 81' Nunes; 89' Mourao	Stadium: Estádio do Campo Grande; Referee: Manuel Marques

5 October 1935; Benfica-Belenenses Cup	Belenenses	2–4	Benfica	Lisbon
				Stadium: Campo das Salésias

25 December 1935	Benfica	1–2	ČAFC Židenice	Lisbon
	Valadas 4'		10' Kese; Klima	Stadium: Estádio das Amoreiras; Referee: Manuel Marques

29 December 1935	Porto	2–0	Benfica	Porto
	Valadas 4'		Pinga	Stadium: Campo do Ameal; Referee: Vieira da Costa

3 February 1956	Oliveirense	2–15	Benfica	Oliveira de Azeméis
				Stadium: Estádio Carlos Osório

17 February 1936	R.D. Águeda	2–4	Benfica	Águeda
				Stadium: Campo de São Sebastião

13 May 1936	Benfica	0–5	Brentford FC	Lisbon
				Stadium: Stadium de Lisboa

17 May 1936	Benfica	1–3	Porto	Lisbon
	Avelino 71' (o.g.)		6' Tavares; 26', 54' Nunes	Stadium: Stadium do Lima; Referee: Horácio Cunha

28 May 1936	Benfica	2–1	Luso FC	Lisbon

12 July 1936	C.F. União	1–5	Benfica	Funchal
				Stadium: Estádio dos Barreiros

16 July 1936	Nacional	2–3	Benfica	Funchal
				Stadium: Estádio dos Barreiros

19 July 1936	Marítimo	1–2	Benfica	Funchal
				Stadium: Estádio dos Barreiros

21 July 1936	Marítimo	2–0	Benfica	Funchal
				Stadium: Estádio dos Barreiros

== Player statistics ==
The squad for the season consisted of the players listed in the tables below, as well as staff member Vítor Gonçalves (manager).

Note 1: Note: Flags indicate national team as defined under FIFA eligibility rules. Players may hold more than one non-FIFA nationality.

Note 2: Players with squad numbers marked ‡ joined the club during the 1935-36 season via transfer, with more details in the following section.

No.	Pos	Nat	Player	Total		Campeonato da Liga		Campeonato de Portugal		Campeonato de Lisboa	
No.	Pos	Nat	Player	Apps	Goals	Apps	Goals	Apps	Goals	Apps	Goals
1	GK	(Portugal) POR	Augusto Amaro	4	0	0	0	2	0	2	0
1	GK	(Portugal) POR	Cândido Tavares	22	0	14	0	4	0	4	0
1	GK	(Portugal) POR	Pedro da Conceição	5	0	0	0	0	0	5	0
	DF	(Portugal) POR	João Correia	18	0	9	0	0	0	9	0
2	DF	(Portugal) POR	Francisco Gatinho	29	0	13	0	6	0	10	0
3	DF	(Portugal) POR	Gustavo Teixeira	30	0	13	0	6	0	11	0
	MF	(Portugal) POR	Francisco Costa	5	0	5	0	0	0	0	0
	MF	(Portugal) POR	Paduco	1	0	0	0	0	0	1	0
	MF	(Portugal) POR	Raul Baptista	9	0	2	0	5	0	2	0
5	MF	(Portugal) POR	Francisco Albino	29	2	13	0	6	0	10	2
6	MF	(Portugal) POR	Gaspar Pinto	26	0	9	0	6	0	11	0
7	MF	(Portugal) POR	Domingos Lopes	26	10	9	2	6	2	11	6
	FW	(Portugal) POR	Luís Xavier	22	10	11	6	1	2	10	2
	FW	(Portugal) POR	Manuel de Oliveira	1	0	0	0	0	0	1	0
8	FW	(Portugal) POR	Alberto Cardoso	14	5	3	1	4	1	7	3
8	FW	(Portugal) POR	Guedes Gonçalves	4	2	3	2	1	0	0	0
9	FW	(Portugal) POR	Vítor Silva	24	18	12	8	5	4	7	6
10	FW	(Portugal) POR	Carlos Torres	19	11	12	9	4	1	3	1
10	FW	(Portugal) POR	Rogério Sousa	25	6	14	2	4	0	7	4
11	FW	(Portugal) POR	Alfredo Valadas	28	24	12	12	6	3	10	9

== Transfers ==
=== In ===
Position	Player	From	Fee	Ref
GK	Cândido Tavares	Casa Pia A.C.	Undisclosed	
MF	Raul Baptista	Barreirense	Undisclosed	

=== Out ===
Position	Player	To	Fee	Ref
MF	Tamanqueiro	Braga	Undisclosed	
