= List of S.L. Benfica players =

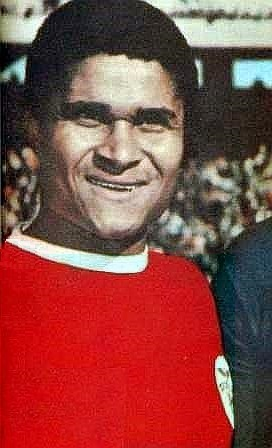
Eusébio is Benfica's all-time top goalscorer.

Sport Lisboa e Benfica is a Portuguese professional football team based in São Domingos de Benfica, Lisbon. (Note: Originally located in Benfica; in 1959, the parish was split in two, with Estádio da Luz located in the new parish.) The club was formed in 1904 and played its first competitive match on 4 November 1906, when it entered the inaugural edition of the Campeonato de Lisboa. They won their first title in 1910, and their first nationwide club competition in 1930, the Campeonato de Portugal, a knockout competition which determined the Portuguese champion among the winners of the regional championships. In 1934, an experimental league competition known as Primeira Liga was introduced in Portuguese football. Due to its success among the clubs, it became the official top-tier championship in 1938, in place of the Campeonato de Portugal. Since its first edition, Benfica have won a record 38 titles. Internationally, they won the European Cup twice, in 1961 and 1962.

Since their first competitive match, more than 750 players have appeared in first-team matches for the club, and almost 150 have made at least 100 appearances. Six former players went on to be first-team managers: Fernando Caiado, José Augusto, Toni, Artur Jorge, Shéu, and Fernando Chalana. Benfica's record appearance maker is Nené, who played 575 matches during his record 18-year career at the club; he is followed by António Veloso and Luisão, each with 538 appearances in 15 seasons. Manuel Bento, who appeared 465 times for the club, is the oldest player to have played for Benfica. He was 41 years and 298 days when he played against Belenenses on 20 May 1990.

Eusébio is the club's top goalscorer with 474 goals in 15 seasons, 317 of which were scored in league matches. Ten players have made more than 400 appearances, including four members of the 1961 European Cup-winning team. Other than Eusébio, only two players, Nené and José Águas, have scored more than 300 goals for the club.

== Key ==
- The list is ordered by date of debut.
- Appearances as a substitute are included.
- Statistics are correct up to and including the match played on 29 October 2026. Where a player left the club permanently after this date, his statistics are updated to the date of departure.

Positions key
| Pre-1960s | | 1960s– | |
|---|---|---|---|
| GK | Goalkeeper | | |
| FB | Full back | DF | Defender |
| HB | Half back | MF | Midfielder |
| FW | Forward | | |
| U | Utility player | | |

Position
Playing positions are listed according to the tactical formations that were employed at the time. Thus the change in the names of defensive and midfield positions reflects the tactical evolution that occurred from the 1960s onwards.
Club career
Club career is defined as the first and last calendar years in which the player appeared for the club in any of the competitions listed below.
League appearances and League goals
League appearances and goals comprise those in the Campeonato de Lisboa and the Primeira Liga. Starting in the 1934–35 season, appearances are only counted in the Primeira Liga.
Total appearances and Total goals
Total appearances and goals comprise those in the Primeira Liga, Taça de Portugal (including in the early denomination as Campeonato de Portugal), Taça da Liga, Supertaça, European Cup/Champions League, UEFA Cup/Europa League, and defunct competitions such as Campeonato de Lisboa, Latin Cup, Cup Winners' Cup, Inter-Cities Fairs Cup and Intercontinental Cup
International team
Countries are listed only for players who have been selected for international football. Only the highest level of international competition is given, except where a player competed for more than one country, in which case the highest level reached for each country is shown.
Caps
For players having played at full international level, the caps column counts the number of such appearances during their career with the club. All information relating to international teams, including number of caps won while with the club, is sourced to Tovar (2012), pp. 679–761, unless otherwise noted.

== Players with 100 or more appearances ==
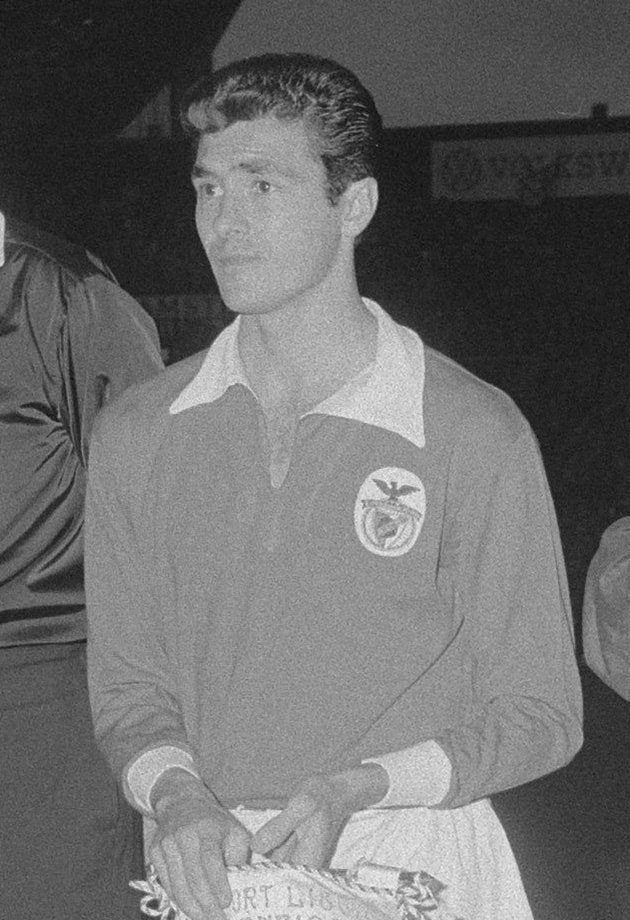
José Águas is Benfica's second-highest all-time goalscorer.

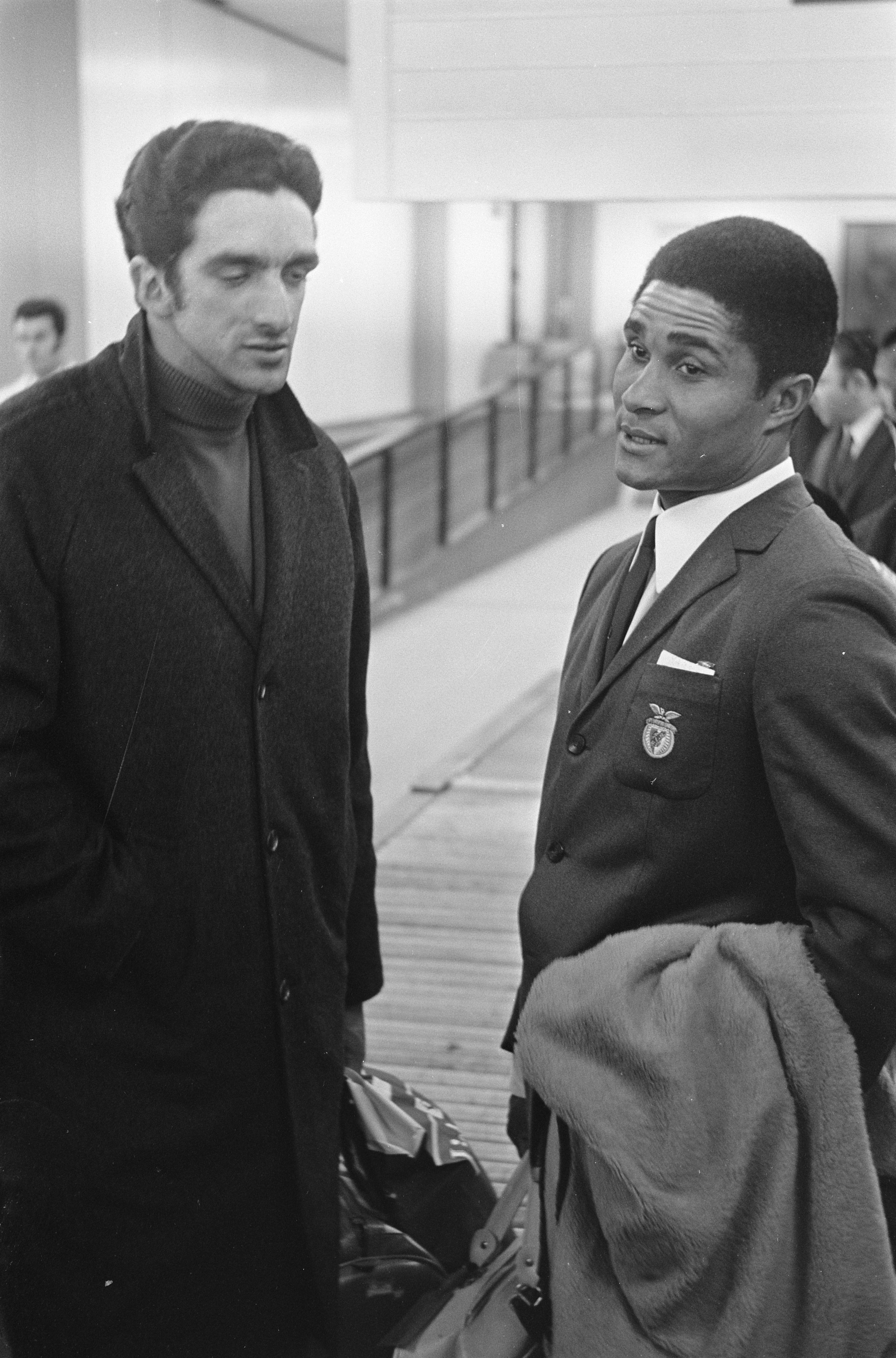
José Torres (left) played for Benfica for 12 years, winning nine league titles.

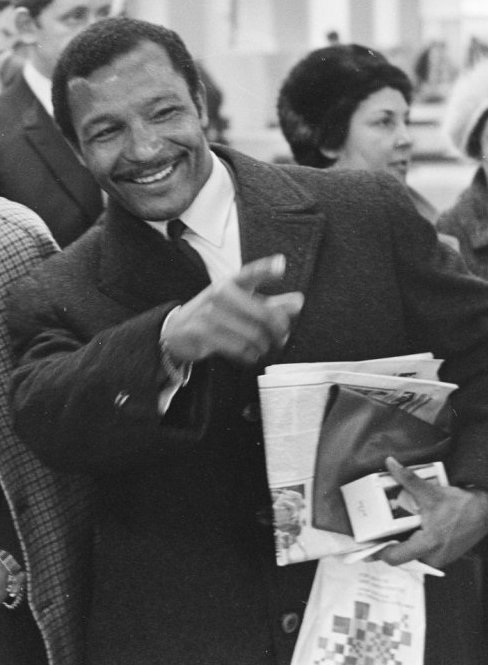
Mário Coluna represented Benfica in 525 games, the third highest number in club history.

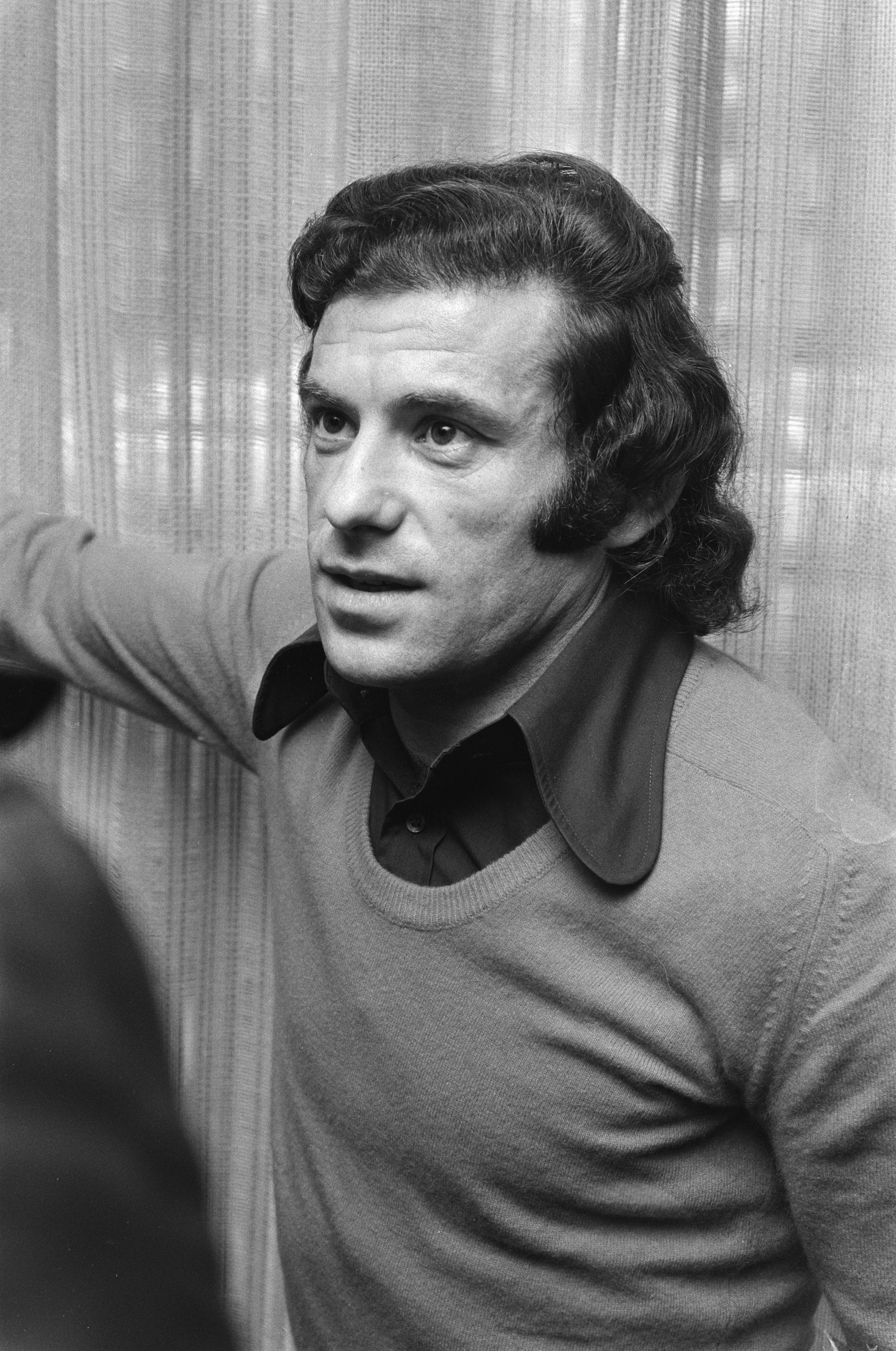
António Simões made 447 appearances for Benfica.

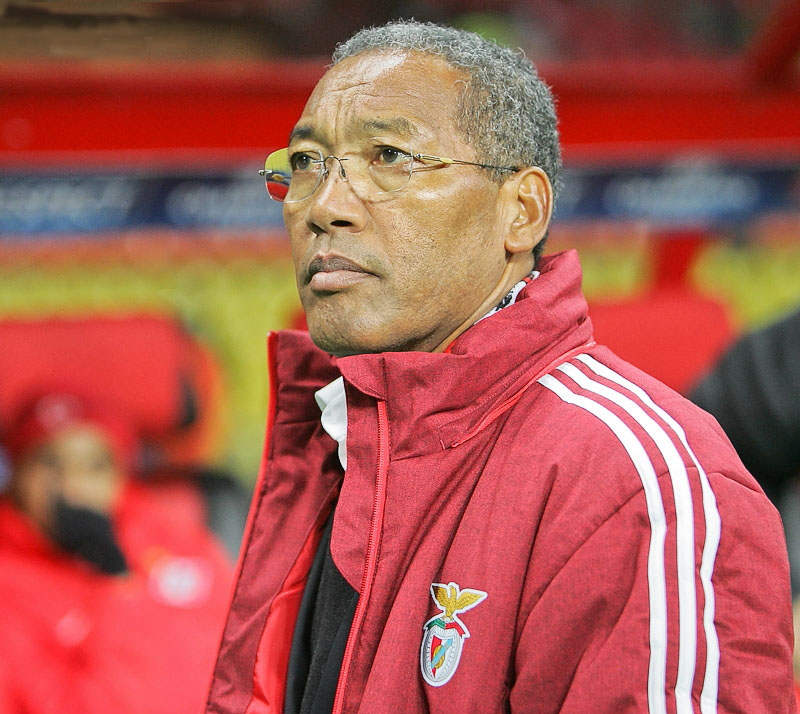
Shéu made 487 appearances for Benfica.

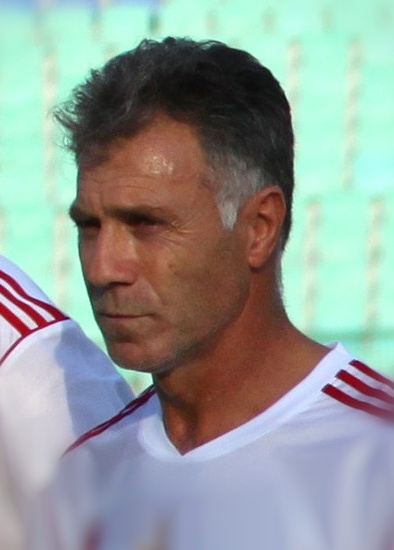
António Veloso has, alongside Luisão, the second-highest number of appearances for Benfica, with 538.

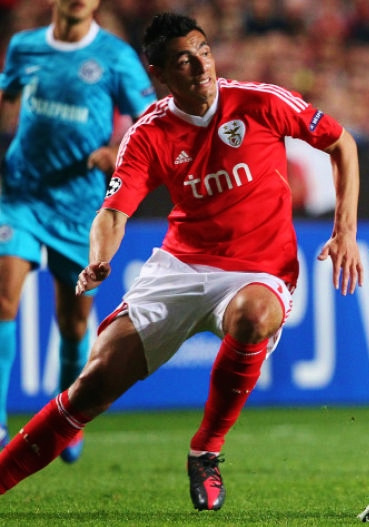
Óscar Cardozo scored 172 goals for Benfica, more than any other foreigner.

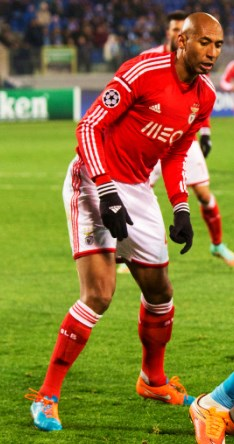
Luisão made 538 appearances for Benfica, the second-highest number alongside Veloso.

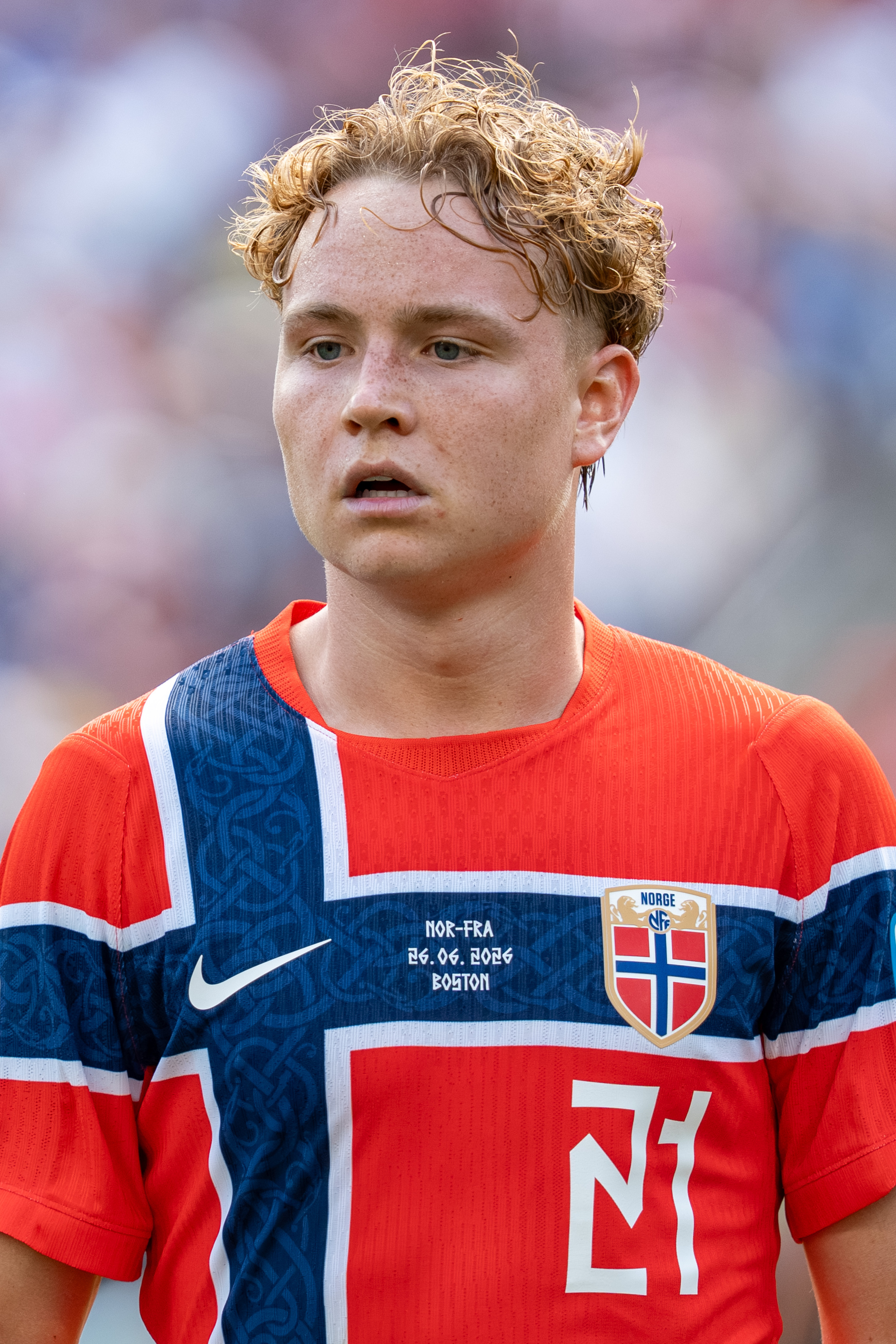
Andreas Schjelderup is the most recent player to have made his 100th appearance.

Table of players, including playing position, club statistics and international team
| Player | Pos | Club career | Apps | Goals | Apps | Goals | International team | Caps | Notes | Refs |
| Player | Pos | Club career | League | | Total | | International team | Caps | Notes | Refs |
|---|---|---|---|---|---|---|---|---|---|---|
| Jesus Crespo | FW | 1917–1929 | 101 | 39 | 101 | 39 | Portugal | 1 | | |
| Jorge Tavares | FW | 1924–1932 | 92 | 33 | 116 | 43 | Portugal | 3 | | |
| Vítor Silva | FW | 1927–1936 | 79 | 62 | 132 | 108 | Portugal | 19 | (Note: Player with the most hat-tricks for Benfica, aged 17) | |
| Gustavo Teixeira | FB | 1932–1939 | 71 | 0 | 157 | 2 | Portugal | 9 | | |
| Francisco Albino | HB | 1932–1945 | 172 | 12 | 343 | 21 | Portugal | 10 | | |
| Rogério Sousa | FW | 1932–1940 | 68 | 46 | 168 | 100 | — | — | | |
| Gaspar Pinto | FB | 1934–1946 | 153 | 4 | 318 | 6 | Portugal | 5 | | |
| Alfredo Valadas | FW | 1934–1944 | 136 | 86 | 264 | 158 | Portugal | 4 | | |
| Joaquim Alcobia | HB | 1936–1937; 1938–1945 | 54 | 0 | 108 | 1 | — | — | | |
| Guilherme Espírito Santo | FW | 1936–1950 | 117 | 79 | 211 | 152 | Portugal | 8 | | |
| César Ferreira | HB | 1938–1946 | 50 | 0 | 111 | 1 | — | — | | |
| Francisco Ferreira | HB | 1938–1952 | 265 | 23 | 398 | 34 | Portugal | 25 | | |
| António Martins | GK | 1938–1947 | 141 | 0 | 265 | 0 | Portugal | 1 | | |
| Joaquim Teixeira | FW | 1938–1946 | 87 | 66 | 173 | 121 | Portugal | 1 | | |
| Julinho | FW | 1942–1953 | 144 | 154 | 200 | 205 | Portugal | 1 | | |
| Rogério Pipi | FW | 1942–1954 | 212 | 125 | 320 | 212 | Portugal | 15 | | |
| Arsénio Duarte | FW | 1943–1955 | 223 | 154 | 299 | 220 | Portugal | 2 | | |
| Jacinto Marques | FB | 1943–1953; 1954–1957 | 202 | 0 | 251 | 0 | — | — | | |
| Félix Antunes | FB | 1944–1954 | 148 | 2 | 188 | 3 | Portugal | 15 | | |
| Francisco Moreira | HB | 1944–1954 | 202 | 4 | 266 | 4 | Portugal | 7 | | |
| Joaquim Fernandes | FB | 1945–1954 | 191 | 1 | 227 | 1 | — | — | | |
| Eduardo Corona | FW | 1946–1953 | 102 | 37 | 127 | 57 | — | — | | |
| José Bastos | GK | 1949–1959 | 142 | 0 | 197 | 0 | — | — | | |
| José Águas | FW | 1950–1963 | 281 | 290 | 383 | 379 | Portugal | 25 | (Note: Second overall for both league and total goals scored) | |
| Artur Santos | FB | 1950–1961 | 229 | 0 | 284 | 0 | Portugal | 2 | | |
| Fernando Caiado | FB | 1952–1959 | 118 | 17 | 141 | 22 | Portugal | 16 | (Note: Player who later became first-team head coach.) | |
| Ângelo Martins | FB | 1952–1965 | 231 | 3 | 285 | 4 | Portugal | 20 | | |
| Francisco Palmeiro | HB | 1953–1961 | 106 | 36 | 114 | 36 | Portugal | 3 | | |
| Alfredo Abrantes | HB | 1954–1960 | 109 | 1 | 140 | 1 | Portugal | 1 | | |
| Domiciano Cavém | U | 1954–1970 | 279 | 77 | 416 | 106 | Portugal | 18 | | |
| Mário Coluna | HB | 1954–1970 | 364 | 89 | 525 | 127 | Portugal | 57 | (Note: Third overall in number of appearances) | |
| Costa Pereira | GK | 1954–1967 | 253 | 0 | 359 | 0 | Portugal | 22 | | |
| Joaquim Santana | FW | 1956–1967 | 104 | 51 | 161 | 79 | Portugal | 5 | | |
| Manuel Serra | FB | 1956–1963 | 70 | 0 | 109 | 0 | Portugal | 1 | | |
| José Neto | FB | 1958–1966 | 104 | 5 | 155 | 6 | — | — | | |
| José Augusto | FW | 1959–1970 | 246 | 104 | 369 | 175 | Portugal | 43 | | |
| Fernando Cruz | FB | 1959–1970 | 227 | 0 | 344 | 1 | Portugal | 11 | | |
| José Torres | FW | 1959–1971 | 173 | 151 | 259 | 226 | Portugal | 31 | | |
| Eusébio | FW | 1960–1975 | 301 | 317 | 440 | 473 | Portugal | 64 | (Note: He holds the club record for total goals scored, league goals scored, and goals scored in a top-flight season (42, in 1967–68).) | |
| Humberto Fernandes | DF | 1960–1969 | 57 | 0 | 106 | 0 | — | — | | |
| Germano de Figueiredo | DF | 1960–1966 | 75 | 4 | 131 | 6 | Portugal | 17 | | |
| António Simões | FW | 1961–1975 | 310 | 46 | 447 | 72 | Portugal | 46 | | |
| Raul Machado | DF | 1962–1969 | 123 | 2 | 193 | 7 | Portugal | 11 | | |
| Jacinto Santos | DF | 1962–1971 | 114 | 5 | 166 | 10 | Portugal | 5 | | |
| Malta da Silva | DF | 1964–1965; 1966–1976 | 138 | 1 | 192 | 1 | Portugal | 5 | | |
| Adolfo Calisto | DF | 1966–1975 | 141 | 3 | 205 | 5 | Portugal | 15 | | |
| Diamantino Costa | FW | 1966–1968; 1969–1977 | 84 | 8 | 122 | 22 | — | — | | |
| José Henrique | GK | 1966–1979 | 217 | 0 | 299 | 0 | Portugal | 15 | | |
| Jaime Graça | MF | 1966–1975 | 159 | 19 | 229 | 29 | Portugal | 24 | | |
| Humberto Coelho | DF | 1968–1975; 1977–1984 | 355 | 56 | 498 | 81 | Portugal | 64 | | |
| Nené | FW | 1968–1986 | 423 | 264 | 575 | 360 | Portugal | 66 | (Note: He holds the club record for both league and overall appearances, and is joint-first with Bento in consecutive seasons at Benfica (18).) | |
| Toni | MF | 1968–1981 | 297 | 16 | 392 | 23 | Portugal | 33 | | |
| Artur Jorge | FW | 1969–1975 | 95 | 74 | 130 | 105 | Portugal | 13 | | |
| Vítor Martins | MF | 1969–1978 | 149 | 22 | 191 | 28 | Portugal | 3 | | |
| Messias | DF | 1969–1977 | 89 | 1 | 123 | 2 | Portugal | 6 | | |
| António Barros | DF | 1970–1971; 1973–1977 | 80 | 0 | 106 | 3 | Portugal | 8 | | |
| Vítor Baptista | FW | 1971–1977 | 97 | 42 | 151 | 63 | Portugal | 8 | | |
| Artur Correia | DF | 1971–1977 | 124 | 3 | 159 | 3 | Portugal | 26 | | |
| Rui Jordão | FW | 1971–1976 | 90 | 63 | 127 | 81 | Portugal | 12 | | |
| Manuel Bento | GK | 1972–1990 | 328 | 0 | 465 | 0 | Portugal | 63 | (Note: Oldest to play for Benfica, aged 41) | |
| Shéu | MF | 1972–1989 | 349 | 33 | 487 | 45 | Portugal | 24 | | |
| António Bastos Lopes | DF | 1972–1987 | 277 | 4 | 391 | 4 | Portugal | 10 | | |
| Fernando Chalana | FW | 1975–1984; 1987–1990 | 224 | 36 | 310 | 47 | Portugal | 27 | | |
| Eurico Gomes | DF | 1975–1979 | 89 | 1 | 114 | 1 | Portugal | 4 | | |
| Alberto Fonseca | DF | 1976–1980 | 92 | 1 | 123 | 1 | Portugal | 7 | | |
| José Luís | MF | 1976–1978; 1979–1987 | 160 | 18 | 224 | 21 | Portugal | 4 | | |
| Minervino Pietra | DF | 1976–1986 | 227 | 19 | 313 | 24 | Portugal | 23 | | |
| João Alves | MF | 1978–1983 | 97 | 28 | 141 | 32 | Portugal | 17 | | |
| Reinaldo Gomes | FW | 1978–1982 | 85 | 48 | 117 | 59 | Portugal | 3 | | |
| Diamantino Miranda | MF | 1978–1980; 1982–1990 | 270 | 62 | 302 | 83 | Portugal | 19 | | |
| Carlos Manuel | DF | 1979–1988 | 215 | 40 | 318 | 58 | Portugal | 42 | | |
| António Veloso | DF | 1980–1995 | 419 | 9 | 538 | 9 | Portugal | 40 | | (Note: Second overall in number of appearances) |
| Álvaro Magalhães | DF | 1981–1990 | 177 | 6 | 261 | 8 | Portugal | 20 | | |
| António Oliveira | DF | 1982–1987 | 98 | 3 | 146 | 5 | Portugal | 3 | | |
| Michael Manniche | FW | 1983–1987 | 89 | 47 | 132 | 75 | Denmark | 2 | | |
| Samuel Quina | DF | 1983–1991; 1992–1993 | 117 | 1 | 159 | 2 | — | — | | |
| Adelino Nunes | MF | 1984–1988 | 74 | 10 | 110 | 20 | Portugal | 6 | | |
| Wando | FW | 1984–1988 | 91 | 12 | 139 | 23 | — | — | | |
| Rui Águas | FW | 1985–1988; 1990–1994 | 173 | 77 | 237 | 104 | Portugal | 22 | | |
| William | DF | 1985–1988; 1990–1994 | 97 | 11 | 134 | 14 | — | — | | |
| César Brito | FW | 1985–1995 | 100 | 21 | 144 | 36 | Portugal | 10 | | |
| Neno | GK | 1985–1987; 1990–1995 | 100 | 0 | 133 | 0 | Portugal | 5 | | |
| José Carlos | DF | 1986–1987; 1989–1993 | 99 | 3 | 135 | 3 | Portugal | 1 | | |
| Silvino Louro | GK | 1986–1994 | 184 | 0 | 263 | 0 | Portugal | 19 | | |
| Mats Magnusson | FW | 1987–1992 | 122 | 65 | 164 | 84 | Sweden | 20 | | |
| Carlos Mozer | DF | 1987–1989; 1992–1995 | 120 | 11 | 161 | 14 | Brazil | 3 | | |
| António Pacheco | FW | 1987–1993 | 162 | 30 | 218 | 48 | Portugal | 6 | | |
| Valdo | MF | 1988–1991; 1995–1997 | 138 | 20 | 183 | 28 | Brazil | 31 | | |
| Ricardo Gomes | DF | 1988–1991; 1995–1996 | 100 | 23 | 140 | 26 | Brazil | 22 | | |
| Vítor Paneira | MF | 1988–1995 | 207 | 28 | 288 | 44 | Portugal | 44 | | |
| Paulo Madeira | DF | 1989–1995; 1997–2002 | 169 | 4 | 225 | 7 | Portugal | 22 | | |
| Paulo Sousa | MF | 1989–1993 | 87 | 1 | 112 | 2 | Portugal | 9 | | |
| Jonas Thern | MF | 1989–1992 | 71 | 8 | 101 | 10 | Sweden | 26 | | |
| Isaías | FW | 1990–1995 | 125 | 52 | 178 | 71 | — | — | | |
| Rui Costa | MF | 1991–1994; 2006–2008 | 121 | 18 | 178 | 29 | Portugal | 8 | | |
| Stefan Schwarz | DF | 1991–1994 | 77 | 7 | 112 | 10 | Sweden | 25 | | |
| Hélder | DF | 1992–1996; 2002–2004 | 166 | 11 | 229 | 16 | Portugal | 26 | | |
| João Pinto | FW | 1992–2000 | 220 | 64 | 302 | 90 | Portugal | 55 | | |
| Michel Preud'homme | GK | 1994–1999 | 147 | 0 | 199 | 0 | Belgium | 3 | | |
| José Calado | MF | 1995–2001 | 138 | 4 | 188 | 8 | Portugal | 2 | | |
| Ronaldo Guiaro | DF | 1996–2001 | 111 | 4 | 140 | 5 | — | — | | |
| Karel Poborský | MF | 1996–2001 | 61 | 11 | 112 | 17 | Czech Republic | 35 | | |
| Nuno Gomes | FW | 1997–2000; 2002–2011 | 293 | 125 | 398 | 166 | Portugal | 60 | | |
| Miguel | DF | 2000–2005 | 131 | 12 | 161 | 13 | Portugal | 23 | | |
| Mantorras | FW | 2001–2010 | 101 | 29 | 129 | 31 | Angola | 29 | | |
| José Moreira | GK | 2001–2011 | 112 | 0 | 148 | 0 | Portugal | 1 | | |
| Simão | FW | 2001–2007 | 172 | 76 | 230 | 94 | Portugal | 48 | | |
| Zlatko Zahovič | MF | 2001–2005 | 80 | 14 | 102 | 20 | Slovenia | 23 | | |
| Petit | MF | 2002–2008 | 148 | 12 | 212 | 14 | Portugal | 44 | | |
| Ricardo Rocha | DF | 2002–2007 | 115 | 3 | 162 | 3 | Portugal | 6 | | |
| Geovanni | FW | 2003–2006 | 91 | 16 | 131 | 23 | — | — | | |
| Luisão | DF | 2003–2018 | 337 | 26 | 538 | 47 | Brazil | 35 | (Note: He holds the club record for most trophies won (20) and matches as captain.) | |
| Quim | GK | 2004–2010 | 144 | 0 | 184 | 0 | Portugal | 11 | | |
| Léo | DF | 2005–2009 | 82 | 1 | 127 | 2 | — | — | | |
| Nélson | DF | 2005–2008 | 72 | 0 | 107 | 2 | — | — | | |
| Kostas Katsouranis | MF | 2006–2009 | 80 | 10 | 122 | 15 | Greece | 31 | | |
| Ruben Amorim | MF | 2007–2011; 2013–2015 | 95 | 5 | 154 | 6 | Portugal | 14 | | |
| Ángel Di María | FW | 2007–2010; 2023–2025 | 129 | 24 | 217 | 51 | Argentina | 25 | | |
| Óscar Cardozo | FW | 2007–2014 | 175 | 112 | 293 | 172 | Paraguay | 43 | | |
| David Luiz | DF | 2007–2011 | 82 | 4 | 131 | 6 | Brazil | 4 | | |
| Maxi Pereira | DF | 2007–2015 | 212 | 13 | 333 | 21 | Uruguay | 91 | | |
| Pablo Aimar | MF | 2008–2013 | 107 | 12 | 179 | 17 | Argentina | 1 | | |
| Carlos Martins | MF | 2008–2011; 2012–2014 | 79 | 6 | 133 | 11 | Portugal | 10 | | |
| Javi García | MF | 2009–2012 | 74 | 6 | 132 | 14 | Spain | 1 | | |
| Javier Saviola | FW | 2009–2012 | 69 | 24 | 122 | 39 | — | — | | |
| Nicolás Gaitán | MF | 2010–2016 | 152 | 25 | 253 | 41 | Argentina | 8 | | |
| Eduardo Salvio | MF | 2010–2011; 2012–2019 | 166 | 38 | 266 | 62 | Argentina | 10 | | |
| Ezequiel Garay | DF | 2011–2014 | 78 | 9 | 136 | 12 | Argentina | 24 | | |
| Jardel | DF | 2011–2021 | 165 | 11 | 283 | 16 | — | — | | |
| Rodrigo | FW | 2011–2014 | 68 | 27 | 120 | 45 | — | — | | |
| Artur | GK | 2011–2015 | 85 | 0 | 144 | 0 | — | — | | |
| Enzo Pérez | MF | 2011; 2012–2014 | 70 | 9 | 117 | 10 | Argentina | 10 | | |
| Lima | FW | 2012–2015 | 89 | 53 | 144 | 70 | — | — | | |
| André Almeida | DF | 2012–2023 | 193 | 9 | 308 | 11 | Portugal | 8 | | |
| Ljubomir Fejsa | MF | 2013–2020 | 114 | 1 | 169 | 2 | Serbia | 12 | | |
| Pizzi | MF | 2014–2022 | 234 | 64 | 360 | 94 | Portugal | 15 | (Note: These statistics include a league goal that Soccerway attributes to Stanislav Kritsyuk as an own goal in a 2–0 away win over Braga on 30 November 2015. According to Liga Portugal (official source) and Benfica, Pizzi scored that goal.) | |
| Andreas Samaris | MF | 2014–2021 | 132 | 4 | 196 | 5 | Greece | 32 | | |
| Jonas | FW | 2014–2019 | 132 | 110 | 183 | 137 | Brazil | 4 | | |
| Eliseu | DF | 2014–2018 | 75 | 4 | 109 | 4 | Portugal | 25 | | |
| Raúl Jiménez | FW | 2015–2018 | 80 | 18 | 120 | 31 | Mexico | 30 | | |
| Franco Cervi | MF | 2016–2021 | 114 | 11 | 172 | 21 | Argentina | 4 | | |
| Álex Grimaldo | DF | 2016–2023 | 197 | 19 | 303 | 27 | — | — | | |
| Rafa Silva | MF | 2016–2024;2026– | 231 | 70 | 361 | 105 | Portugal | 16 | | |
| Rúben Dias | DF | 2017–2020 | 91 | 9 | 137 | 12 | Portugal | 19 | | |
| Haris Seferovic | FW | 2017–2022 | 120 | 57 | 188 | 74 | Switzerland | 38 | | |
| Odysseas Vlachodimos | GK | 2018–2023 | 152 | 0 | 225 | 0 | Greece | 31 | | |
| Gabriel | MF | 2018–2021 | 59 | 3 | 100 | 5 | — | — | | |
| Florentino Luís | MF | 2019–2020;2021;2022–2025 | 112 | 3 | 183 | 4 | — | — | | |
| Chiquinho | MF | 2019–2021;2022–2024 | 78 | 5 | 126 | 9 | — | — | | |
| Adel Taarabt | MF | 2019–2022 | 79 | 2 | 129 | 2 | Morocco | 5 | (Note: Joined in the 2015–16 season, but only made his first team debut in 2018–19 season.) | |
| Julian Weigl | MF | 2020–2022 | 77 | 3 | 115 | 5 | — | — | | |
| Nicolás Otamendi | DF | 2020–2026 | 177 | 12 | 281 | 18 | Argentina | 32 | | |
| Gilberto | DF | 2020–2023 | 66 | 4 | 106 | 8 | — | — | | |
| Gonçalo Ramos | FW | 2020–2023 | 64 | 30 | 106 | 41 | Portugal | 7 | | |
| João Mário | MF | 2021–2024 | 94 | 23 | 149 | 36 | Portugal | 11 | | |
| Tomás Araújo | MF | 2021– | 76 | 3 | 122 | 4 | Portugal | 1 | | |
| Fredrik Aursnes | MF | 2022– | 123 | 11 | 209 | 16 | Norway | 14 | | |
| António Silva | DF | 2022–2026 | 108 | 7 | 183 | 10 | Portugal | 15 | | |
| Alexander Bah | DF | 2022– | 81 | 6 | 126 | 9 | Denmark | 17 | | |
| Anatoliy Trubin | GK | 2023– | 92 | 0 | 155 | 1 | Ukraine | 12 | | |
| Andreas Schjelderup | MF | 2023– | 58 | 9 | 104 | 17 | Norway | 22 | | |
| Vangelis Pavlidis | FW | 2024– | 76 | 50 | 127 | 77 | Greece | 6 | | |
| Leandro Barreiro | MF | 2024– | 66 | 8 | 111 | 14 | Luxembourg | 19 | | |

== See also ==
- List of S.L. Benfica records and statistics
