= Carlos Torres (Portuguese footballer) =

Portuguese footballer

Personal information
- Date of birth: 1 April 1908
- Place of birth: Torres Novas, Portugal
- Date of death: deceased
- Place of death: Portugal
- Position: Forward

Senior career*
Years	Team	Apps	(Gls)
1926–1933	CD Torres Novas		
1933–1937	Benfica	28	(23)
- * Club domestic league appearances and goals

Carlos Torres (1 April 1908 - deceased) is a former Portuguese footballer who played as a forward.

Torres started at CD Torres Novas, moving to Benfica in 1933, where he spent four years, scoring 34 goals in 60 matches, winning the Primeira Liga and the Campeonato de Portugal.

== Career ==
Born in Torres Novas, Torres played football for various clubs in his home-town, eventually settling at CD Torres Novas, where he spent seven seasons. In 1933, he moved to Benfica, making his debut on 25 February 1934, against Belenenses. He competed with Rogério and Vítor Silva, but was still the team top scorer, bagging seven goals in seven appearances. The following season, Benfica signed Valadas, which brought more competition to him. Nonetheless, he scored 16 and helped the club win the Campeonato de Portugal on 30 June 1935, against Sporting.

In 1935–36, Torres scored 9 in the Primeira Liga and helped Benfica win their first league title. With the breakthrough of Espírito Santos in 1936–37, his influence was significantly reduced and he did not play in the league, thus not winning his second league title. He left the club with 34 goals in 60 matches, winning two major honours.

== Honours ==
Benfica

- Primeira Divisão: 1935–36
- Campeonato de Portugal: 1934–35

== Personal life ==
He is the uncle of José Augusto Torres, who also played for Benfica from 1959 to 1971.
