= João Correia (footballer, born 1911) =

Portuguese footballer

Personal information
- Date of birth: 1911
- Place of birth: Portugal
- Date of death: 1984 (aged 73–74)
- Place of death: Portugal
- Position(s): Half-back

Senior career*
Years	Team	Apps	(Gls)
1930–1939	Benfica	39	(1)
- *Club domestic league appearances and goals

João Correia (1911–1984) is a former Portuguese footballer who played as a half-back.

He spent nearly a decade at Benfica, winning several silverware.

== Career ==
Correia arrived at Benfica in 1930, but only made his debut on 28 June 1931, against Porto, in the final of the Campeonato de Portugal. In the following season, he partnered with Jorge Tavares and Manuel de Oliveira in the midfield, helping Benfica reach the semi-finals of the Campeonato de Portugal, playing all of the games. A year later, with Albino replacing Tavares, he played 21 games for Benfica, winning the Campeonato de Lisboa. He did not play for the first team in 1933–34, but returned in the following year, making three appearances.

In 1935–36, back on the first team with Albino and Gaspar Pinto, he helped the club win the Primeira Liga. He remained with Benfica until 1939, but with negligent influence, as Raúl Baptista, Joaquim Alcobia and Francisco Ferreira all overtook him in the pecking order. In total, he made 71 games for them and scored twice.

== Honours ==
Benfica

- Primeira Divisão: 1935–36, 1936–37, 1937–38
- Campeonato de Portugal: 1930–31
- Campeonato de Lisboa: 1932–33
