= Alberto Cardoso =

Portuguese footballer

Personal information
- Full name: Alberto Fernando Cardoso
- Date of birth: 17 October 1906
- Place of birth: Lisbon, Portugal
- Date of death: deceased
- Place of death: Portugal
- Position: Forward

Senior career*
Years	Team	Apps	(Gls)
1930–1938	Benfica	31	(12)
- * Club domestic league appearances and goals

Alberto Fernando Cardoso (17 October 1906 - deceased), is a former Portuguese footballer who played as a forward.

Cardoso joined Benfica in 1930, where he spent four years, scoring 23 goals in 62 matches, winning two Primeira Liga's and two Campeonatos de Portugal.

== Career ==
Born in Lisbon, Cardoso joined Benfica in 1930, making his debut on 26 October, against Belenenses. In his first year, he won the Campeonato de Portugal with Benfica, but the majority of his matches and goals were in the Campeonato de Lisboa. In his first years, he faced competition from Augusto Dinis and Vítor Silva, so his playing time was reduced and mainly spent in the Campeonato de Lisboa. Later, it was Valadas, Rogério and Carlos Torres, who beat him to the first team, so Cardoso played only sporadically over the course of his eight–years spell at Benfica, racking 23 goals in 62 appearances.

== Honours ==
Benfica

- Primeira Divisão: 1935–36, 1937–38
- Campeonato de Portugal:1930–31, 1934–35
- Campeonato de Lisboa: 1932–33
