= Elói (footballer) =

Portuguese footballer (1920–2000)

Personal information
- Full name: Francisco Elói dos Santos
- Date of birth: 29 July 1920
- Place of birth: Alhos Vedros, Portugal
- Date of death: 2000 (aged 80)
- Position: Full back

Senior career*
Years	Team	Apps	(Gls)
1937–1938	Barreirense		
1938–1942	Benfica	38	(0)
1942–1956	Estoril Praia		
- * Club domestic league appearances and goals

Francisco Elói dos Santos (29 July 1920 – 2000), known as Elói, was a Portuguese footballer who played as a full back.

Elói joined Benfica in 1938, winning one league and a cup in five years there. He then moved to Estoril Praia, staying there for 14 years.

== Career ==
Born in Alhos Vedros on 29 July 1920, Elói started at Barreirense, before moving to Benfica in 1938, making his debut at the hands of János Biri on 8 October 1939, against Belenenses. He went on to appear in every game that Benfica played in that season, making 35 appearances, many of those alongside Gaspar Pinto, helping the club win the 1939–40 Taça de Portugal.

Elói's partnership with Gaspar Pinto was kept in 1940–41, but without the same success, as Benfica did not win anything. Still, he played every game possible, making 31 appearances. In 1941–42 he battled for a first team place with Ricardo Freire, appearing in 6 league games, as Benfica won the league. Elói left the club in 1942 after playing in 75 games, subsequently starting a long career at Estoril Praia.

Elói died in 2000, at the age of 80.

== Honours ==
Benfica

- Primeira Divisão: 1941–42
- Taça de Portugal: 1939–40
