= Ricardo Freire =

Portuguese footballer

Personal information
- Date of birth: 5 October 1919
- Place of birth: Portugal
- Date of death: unknown
- Place of death: Portugal
- Position(s): Full back

Senior career*
Years	Team	Apps	(Gls)
1936–1943	Benfica	13	(0)
- *Club domestic league appearances and goals

Ricardo Freire (born 5 May 1919; deceased) was a Portuguese footballer who played as a full back.

He joined Benfica in 1938, but rarely ever played during his six years there. He made a total of 31 appearances, winning two titles.

== Career ==
Freire joined Benfica in 1936, making his debut on 25 October, against Belenenses. He was exclusively used in the Campeonato de Lisboa, playing eight games and scoring seven goals. A seldom used player, competition from Gaspar Pinto and Elói made him a fringe player, appearing in only 10 games from 1938 until 1941.

In 1941–42, he gained his place in the first team alongside Gaspar Pinto, helping Benfica win the league, making seven appearances. Following another season without receiving playing time in the league, he left the club, with 31 matches played and seven goals.

== Honours ==
Benfica

- Primeira Divisão: 1941–42
- Taça de Portugal: 1939–40
