= Francisco Gatinho =

Portuguese footballer

Personal information
- Date of birth: 22 March 1909
- Place of birth: Portugal
- Date of death: deceased
- Place of death: Portugal
- Position(s): Full back

Senior career*
Years	Team	Apps	(Gls)
1930–1936	Benfica	38	(0)
1936–1941	Belenenses	40	(3)
- *Club domestic league appearances and goals

Francisco Gatinho (22 March 1909 - deceased) is a former Portuguese footballer who played as a full back.

He joined Benfica in 1930, playing 88 games with them and winning three honours. Afterwards, he played 73 games for Belenenses.

== Career ==
Gatinho joined Benfica in 1930, making his debut on 19 April 1931, against Olhanense, helping them win the Campeonato de Portugal. He competed with Ralph Bailão, João Oliveira and Luís Costa, playing mainly in the Campeonato de Portugal. In 1932–33, he won the Campeonato de Lisboa, playing 6 games in the competition.

His breakthrough started in 1934–35, when he joined Gustavo Teixeira in the defence, and played 33 games, more than anyone else in the club. The following year, he helped the club win their first league title, playing 29 games in total, only bettered by Gustavo Teixeira. However, 1935–36 was his last year at Benfica, as Gatinho left the club after 88 games, moving to Belenenses, where he spent the next five seasons.

== Honours ==
Benfica

- Primeira Divisão: 1935–36
- Campeonato de Portugal: 1930–31, 1934–35
- Campeonato de Lisboa: 1932–33
