= Raul Baptista =

Portuguese footballer

Personal information
- Full name: Raul Alexandre Baptista
- Date of birth: 29 July 1911
- Place of birth: Portugal
- Position: Half-back

Senior career*
Years	Team	Apps	(Gls)
1928–1935	Barreirense		
1935–1941	Benfica	49	(0)
- * Club domestic league appearances and goals

Raul Baptista (born 29 July 1911) was a Portuguese footballer who played as a half-back.

Starting at Barreirense, where he spent seven years, Baptista achieved recognition at Benfica, appearing in nearly 100 games and winning four major titles.

== Career ==
Baptista arrived at Benfica in 1935 after seven seasons with Barreirense. He made his debut on 24 November, against Belenenses. With competition from João Correia, Albino and Gaspar Pinto, he only racked up 9 appearances, two in the Primeira Liga, allowing him to win his first league title. In the following year, he displaced Correia out of the first team and played 25 games on the way to back-to-back league titles. A year later, he completed a championship three-peat as regular first team, playing in all the league games and making 28 appearances in total.

In 1938–39, the breakthrough of Francisco Ferreira made a negative impact in his career, and he saw his playing time drop, to just 11 games. However, Baptista recovered his place in the first team in 1939–40, playing 20 games and winning the 1939–40 Taça de Portugal. The following year, he only played twice as Alcobia took his place in the starting eleven. He left Benfica with 95 appearances and four major wins.

== Honours ==
Benfica

- Primeira Divisão: 1935–36, 1936–37, 1937–38
- Taça de Portugal: 1939–40
