= Alfredo Valadas =

Portuguese footballer

Personal information
- Full name: Alfredo Valadas Mendes
- Date of birth: 16 February 1912
- Place of birth: Beja, Portugal
- Date of death: 1994 (age 82)
- Position: Outside forward

Senior career*
Years	Team	Apps	(Gls)
1928–1931	Luso Sport Clube		
1931–1933	Sporting CP	11	(4)
1933–1934	Sport Lisboa e Beja		
1934–1944	Benfica	136	(86)
Total		147	(88)

International career
1932–1938	Portugal	6	(2)

Managerial career
- 1944–1947: Benfica (assistant)
- 1947–1949: Vitória Guimarães
- 1950–1952: Salgueiros
- 1959–1960: Feirense (assistant)
- * Club domestic league appearances and goals

Alfredo Valadas Mendes (16 February 1912 – 1994) was a Portuguese footballer who played as outside forward.

Over the course of 10 seasons, he amassed Primeira Liga totals of 136 games and eighty six goals, all at Benfica, winning nine major titles.

== Club career ==
Born in Minas de S. Domingos, Beja; Valadas started his career at Luso Sport Clube, a delegation of Sporting CP at only age 15.

With 19 years-old, he moved to Lisbon to play for Sporting, with the promise that they help him find a job, which they never did. After two seasons, he moved back to Beja, spent a year without competing and then joined Sport Lisboa e Beja in the regional league.

In 1934, he returned to Lisbon and joined Benfica, again with the promise to help him find a job, which they did, when he became a civil servant in 1937. He made his debut on 14 October 1934, in a home win against his former team, Sporting, and helped the club conquer the Campeonato de Portugal, again defeating previous team on 30 June 1935. He was also the club's first goalscorer in the Primeira Liga, after opening the score in a 3-1 win over Vitória de Setúbal on 20 January 1935 and finished the season with 23 goals in all competitions, a club best. In the following three seasons, he played alongside Vítor Silva, Espírito Santo and Domingos Lopes, as Benfica conquered a three-peat, winning the league in 1935–36, 1936–37, 1937–38, with Valadas being club topscorer in the first of those.

On 31 January 1937, he scored the club 100th goal in the Primeira Liga. In the nineteen-forties, he scored 21 league goals in two seasons combined, to help the club win two more leagues, in 1941–42, 1942–43. He retired with a match in his honor on 1 December 1944, after 264 official matches, scoring 158 times; immediately assuming an assistant position under János Biri.

In 1947, he made his debut as head coach, guiding Vitória Guimarães to a seventh place in the 1947–48 season, and improving one position in the next season. He also guided Salgueiros to the first division in 1951–52.

== International career ==
Valadas made his national team debut against Yugoslavia on 3 May 1932 in Lisbon and scored 1 goal in a 3–2 win. He gained 6 caps and scored 2 goals, with his last cap arriving in a one-nil win over Spain on 30 January 1938.

== Honours ==
Benfica

- Primeira Divisão: 1935–36, 1936–37, 1937–38, 1941–42, 1942–43
- Taça de Portugal: 1939–40, 1943–44
- Campeonato de Portugal: 1934–35
- Campeonato de Lisboa: 1939–40
