= Carcavelinhos F.C. =

Defunct Portuguese association football club

Carcavelinhos
- Full name: Carcavelinhos Football Club
- Nicknames: Alcantarenses; Carroceiros
- Short name: Carcavelinhos F.C.
- Founded: 14 February 1912; 114 years ago
- Dissolved: 18 September 1942
- Ground: Campo da Tapadinha

Carcavelinhos Football Club (Portuguese pronunciation: [kɐɾkɐvɐˈliɲuʃ futɨˈβɔl ˈkluβɨ]), commonly known as Carcavelinhos F.C. or simply Carcavelinhos, was a Portuguese football club based in Alcântara, Lisbon. Founded on 14 February 1912, the club competed in regional and national football competitions before ceasing to exist as an independent entity on 18 September 1942, when it merged with União Foot-Ball Lisboa to form Atlético Clube de Portugal.

Carcavelinhos' greatest achievement came in the 1927–28 Campeonato de Portugal, when it won the national knockout competition, the most important national football tournament in Portugal at the time. After defeating Benfica 3–0 in the semi-finals, Carcavelinhos beat Sporting CP 3–1 in the final, played at Campo de Palhavã in Lisbon on 30 June 1928. The club also won the Segunda Divisão in 1934–35 and 1938–39. Its home ground was Campo da Tapadinha, inaugurated on 27 June 1926, which subsequently became the home of Atlético Clube de Portugal.

== Honours ==
- Campeonato de Portugal
  - Winners (1): 1927–28
- Segunda Divisão
  - Winners (2): 1934–35, 1938–39
