= C.D. Palhavã =

Portuguese football club

- Full name: Clube Desportivo da Palhavã
- Founded: 1917
- Dissolved: 1929

Clube Desportivo da Palhavã was a Portuguese football club from, Palhavã. It was founded in 1917 as Império Lisboa Clube, which was formed by a merge between the clubs Sport Clube Império (founded in 1907 and one of the first members of the Lisbon FA) and Lisboa Futebol Clube. By 1928 it changed to its last name, Clube Desportivo da Palhavã. As S.C. Império and, later, Império L.C. it organized the Império Cup, one of the first attempts to create a nationwide footballing tournament.
