= Álvaro Pina =

Portuguese footballer

Personal information
- Date of birth: 15 November 1906
- Place of birth: Portugal
- Date of death: Deceased
- Position: Defender

Senior career*
Years	Team	Apps	(Gls)
- Barreirense

International career
1930	Portugal	1	(0)
- * Club domestic league appearances and goals

Álvaro Pina (born 15 November 1906), former Portuguese footballer who played as defender.

== International career ==
Pina played 1 cap for Portugal, in a 0-1 defeat against Spain 30 November 1930 in Porto.
