= Pedro Pireza =

Portuguese footballer

Personal information
- Full name: Pedro Pireza
- Date of birth: 30 September 1911
- Place of birth: Barreiro, Portugal
- Date of death: in 1989
- Position: Forward

Senior career*
Years	Team	Apps	(Gls)
1927–1935	Barreirense		
1935–1944	Sporting		

International career
1936–1941	Portugal	2	(0)
- * Club domestic league appearances and goals

Pedro Pireza (30 September 1911 in Barreiro, Portugal – sometime in 1989) was a Portuguese footballer who played forward for Barreirense and Sporting. Pireza, had 2 caps for the Portugal national team.
