= Guilherme Espírito Santo =

Portuguese footballer

Personal information
- Full name: Guilherme Santa Graça do Espírito Santo
- Date of birth: 30 October 1919
- Place of birth: Lisbon, Portugal
- Date of death: 25 November 2012 (aged 93)
- Place of death: Lisbon, Portugal
- Positions: Centre forward; right winger

Youth career
- 1927–1936: Benfica de Luanda

Senior career*
Years	Team	Apps	(Gls)
1936–1950	Benfica	117	(79)
Total		117	(79)

International career
1937–1945	Portugal	8	(1)

Managerial career
- 1977: Montijo
- 1979–1981: Quimigal do Barreiro
- * Club domestic league appearances and goals

Guilherme Santa Graça do Espírito Santo (30 October 1919 – 25 November 2012), best known as Espírito Santo, was a Portuguese footballer and athlete.

Over the course of 12 seasons he amassed Primeira Liga totals of 117 games and 79 goals, spending all of his career at Benfica, winning seven major titles.

Nicknamed The Black Pearl, he was a prolific goalscorer, with Peyroteo even claiming he was a more complete footballer than him.

== Career ==
=== Club ===
Born in Lisbon, of São Toméan descent, Espírito Santo moved to Luanda at the age of 8, and joined the local Benfica delegation, Sport Luanda e Benfica. A fast and agile footballer, his performances led him to being call up to Benfica at age 16, to replace his idol — Vítor Silva – as centre forward. He made his debut on 10 January 1937, still age 17, in a 2–1 win against Vitória de Setúbal, scoring both goals from Benfica.

His 23 goals in two seasons helped the club achieve a three-peat, with Espírito Santo assisting in the final two, in 1936–37, 1937–38. A notable event in his career was match for the 1937–38 Campeonato de Lisboa, when scored 9 goals in a 13–1 trashing of Casa Pia on 5 December 1937. He also took part on historic reversal of a 1–6 deficit in the semi-final of the Taça Portugal against Porto on 18 June 1939, scoring twice in a 6–0 win.

In 1941, he suffered a serious medical condition that sideline him for two whole seasons, only reappearing on 6 February 1944. Moved to the right wing, Espírito Santo helped the club win two more league titles, and two Portuguese Cups, scoring over 50 goals in the process. He retired in 1950, playing his last match on 13 November 1949, with 211 matches and 152 goals scored. For his services, the club awarded him with the Aguia de Ouro (Golden Eagle) medal, and the Olympic Committee of Portugal, with a Fair Play medal.

He had a short stint as manager in the late seventies, managing C.D. Montijo in the final matches of the 1976–77 season, as well Quimigal do Barreiro for two seasons on the second level.

He died in Lisbon on 25 November 2012, at age 93.

=== International ===
He was the first black player to be capped for Portugal. Espírito Santo represented his country on 8 games, with his first cap arriving on 28 November 1937, in 2–1 win against Spain in Vigo. He sole goal came on 9 January 1938, in a 4–0 win against Hungary, and was last capped on 21 April 1945, in an away loss against Switzerland.

=== Athletics ===
Espírito Santo ventured briefly into the Track and field competitions. He was spotted when he jump 1.70 meters to go get a ball that stranded off pitch. He held the national record for High Jump for 20 years and was national champion for Long Jump and Triple Jump in 1938.

== Personal life ==
Espírito Santo's brother, Renato, was also an athlete for Benfica.

== Honours ==
=== Football ===
Benfica

- Campeonato da Liga/Primeira Divisão: 1936–37, 1937–38, 1941–42, 1942–43, 1944–45, 1949–50
- Taça de Portugal: 1939–40, 1943–44, 1948–49
- Campeonato de Lisboa: 1939–40

=== Athletics ===
Benfica

- Portugal High Jump Record - (1,88m) from 1940-1960
- Portugal Long Jump Record - (6,89m) from 1938–1940
- Portugal Triple Jump Record - (14,015m) from 1938–1940
