= Manuel Soeiro =

Portuguese footballer (1909–1977)

Personal information
- Full name: Manuel Esteves Soeiro Vasques
- Date of birth: 17 March 1909
- Place of birth: Barreiro, Portugal
- Date of death: February 1977 (aged 67)
- Position: Striker

Youth career
- Luso

Senior career*
Years	Team	Apps	(Gls)
1928–1933	Luso		
1933–1945	Sporting CP	104	(99)

International career
1932–1941	Portugal	12	(5)
- * Club domestic league appearances and goals

Manuel Esteves Soeiro Vasques (17 March 1909 – February 1977), known as Soeiro, was a Portuguese footballer who played as a striker.

== Club career ==
Born in Barreiro, Setúbal District, Soeiro signed for Sporting CP in 1933 from local Luso. During his 12-year spell with the former club, he helped to victory in four Taça de Portugal – the competition was known as Campeonato de Portugal until 1938 – and the 1940–41 edition of the Primeira Liga; additionally, he was the latter tournament's top scorer in 1934–35 and 1936–37.

Soeiro appeared in 219 games for Sporting in all competitions, scoring 206 goals.

== International career ==
Soeiro earned 12 caps for the Portugal national team in nine years. He made his debut on 3 May 1932 in a friendly against Yugoslavia, netting once in the 3–2 win in Lisbon.

== Personal life ==
Soeiro's nephew, Manuel Vasques, was also a footballer. He too played for Sporting and Portugal.
