= João Cruz (footballer, born 1915) =

Portuguese footballer

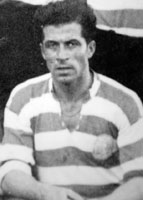

Personal information
- Date of birth: 31 October 1915
- Place of birth: Évora, Portugal
- Date of death: 7 July 1981 (aged 65)

Senior career*
Years	Team	Apps	(Gls)
1934–1936	Vitória Setúbal		
1936–1947	Sporting CP		

International career
1938–1942	Portugal	10	(3)
- * Club domestic league appearances and goals

João Pedro da Cruz (31 October 1915 – 7 July 1981) known as João Cruz was a Portuguese football player who played forward for Vitória Setúbal and Sporting CP.

== International career ==
João Cruz played 10 games and scored 3 goals for the Portugal national team. Cruz made his debut 9 January 1938 in Lisbon against Hungary, and scored 2 goals in a 4–0 victory. He played his last game 1 January 1942 against Switzerland in a 3–0 victory in Lisbon.
