= António Vieira (Portuguese footballer) =

Portuguese footballer

Personal information
- Date of birth: 6 January 1912
- Place of birth: Moita, Portugal
- Date of death: Unknown
- Position: Defender

Senior career*
Years	Team	Apps	(Gls)
1933–1935	Vitória Setúbal		
1935–1939	Benfica		

International career
1938–1939	Portugal	2	(0)
- * Club domestic league appearances and goals

António Vieira (born 6 January 1912 in Moita – deceased) was a Portuguese footballer who played as a defender.
