= Francisco Albino =

Portuguese footballer

Albino
Personal information
- Full name: Francisco Alves Albino
- Date of birth: 2 November 1912
- Place of birth: Tortosendo, Portugal
- Date of death: 25 February 1993 (aged 80)
- Place of death: Lisbon, Portugal
- Position: Midfielder

Youth career
- 1929–1932: Benfica

Senior career*
Years	Team	Apps	(Gls)
1932–1945	Benfica	172	(12)

International career
1935–1939	Portugal	10	(0)
- * Club domestic league appearances and goals

Francisco Alves Albino (2 November 1912 – 25 February 1993), best known as Albino, was a Portuguese footballer who played as a midfielder.

Over the course of 13 seasons, he amassed Primeira Liga totals of 172 games and twelve goals, spending all of his career at Benfica, winning nine major titles.

== Career ==
=== Club ===
Born in Tortosendo, a village in the vicinity of the Serra da Estrela, Albino arrived at Benfica at the age of 17, under Arthur John reign, to represent the youth teams.

A slender, but hard-working footballer; at 20 years old, manager Ribeiro dos Reis gave him, an opportunity with the first team, when they faced Braga Regional team in a friendly on 26 December 1932. His official debut came twelve days later, in a home win against F.C. Barreirense.

Over the next decade, he assumed a vital role in the midfield of Benfica, first at the right, and later at the middle, playing side by side with Gaspar Pinto and Francisco Ferreira. His teammates nicknamed him Tempero (seasoning) because of his trademark quote — Quando é que vem o tempero? (When does the seasoning arrive?) — in reference to the prize money awarded for wins.

He played his last match on 8 April 1945 in a five-nil trashing of Vitória de Guimarães, after well over 300 official games, and with six championship's won. For his dedication, the club awarded him with the Sócio de Mérito (Merit Member) and Águia de Prata (Silver Eagle).

=== International ===
Albino made his debut for Portugal, against Spain in a 3–3 draw on 5 May 1935. He was capped 10 times, with his last in a 2–4 loss against Switzerland on 12 February 1939.

== Honours ==
Benfica

- Primeira Divisão: 1935–36, 1936–37, 1937–38, 1941–42, 1942–43, 1944–45
- Taça de Portugal: 1939–40, 1942–43, 1943–44
- Campeonato de Portugal: 1934–35
- Campeonato de Lisboa: 1932–33, 1939–40

== See also ==
- List of one-club men
