= Gaspar Pinto =

Portuguese footballer (1912–1969)

Personal information
- Full name: Álvaro Gaspar Pinto
- Date of birth: 27 February 1912
- Place of birth: Oeiras, Portugal
- Date of death: 27 April 1969 (aged 57)
- Position: Defender

Senior career*
Years	Team	Apps	(Gls)
1933–1934	Carcavelinhos		
1934	Belenenses	1	(0)
1934–1946	Benfica	153	(4)
Total		154	(4)

International career
1934–1942	Portugal	7	(0)
- * Club domestic league appearances and goals

Álvaro Gaspar Pinto (27 February 1912 – 27 April 1969), known as Gaspar Pinto, was a Portuguese footballer who played as a defender.

Over the course of 11 seasons he amassed Primeira Liga totals of 154 games and four goals, spending the majority of his career at Benfica, winning nine major titles.

== Career ==
Born in Oeiras, Gaspar Pinto started in Carcavelinhos, where by the age of 21 he received his first call-up for the national team. After a short spell at Belenenses, he joined Benfica in 1934, making his debut on 3 February 1935, in a 1–2 loss against Porto, at the Estádio do Lima.

Capable of operating either as full back or half back, for the first part of his career, he played as half back, alongside Álvaro Pina, Albino, Baptista and Francisco Ferreira, and then descending down to full back, where his matches against Peyroteo from Sporting and Pinga from Porto gave him greater notability.

He made his last official match in a 2–3 loss against Atlético on 9 June 1946, at Estádio Nacional, after representing the club for over 300 games. To celebrate his retirement, a farewell match against Olhanense was played on 9 September 1946.

== International career ==
Gaspar Pinto gained 7 caps for Portugal and made his debut on 11 March 1934 in Madrid against Spain, in 9–0 defeat, in a qualification match for the 1934 World Cup. He made his last cap in a three-nil win against Switzerland on 1 January 1942.

== Honours ==
Benfica

- Primeira Divisão: 1935–36, 1936–37, 1937–38, 1941–42, 1942–43, 1944–45
- Taça de Portugal (2): 1939–40, 1942–43
- Campeonato de Portugal: 1934–35
- Campeonato de Lisboa: 1939–40
