= Estádio das Amoreiras =

Multi-use stadium in Lisbon, Portugal

Coordinates: 38.724124°N 9.16328°W

- Interactive map of Estádio das Amoreiras
- Location: Lisbon, Portugal
- Owner: S.L. Benfica
- Capacity: 20,000
- Surface: Grass

Construction
- Groundbreaking: 1924
- Built: 1925
- Opened: 13 December 1925
- Closed: 1940
- Demolished: 1940

Tenant
- S.L. Benfica (1925–1940)

Estádio das Amoreiras, also known as Campo das Amoreiras, was a multi-use stadium in Lisbon, Portugal. It was used mostly for football matches and hosted the home games of S.L. Benfica. Opened in 1925, the stadium was able to hold 20,000 spectators. It was demolished in 1940 to make way for a freeway. Benfica then moved to Estádio do Campo Grande.
