= Luís Xavier =

Portuguese footballer

Personal information
- Full name: Luís Xavier Júnior
- Date of birth: 10 December 1967
- Place of birth: Setúbal, Portugal
- Date of death: Deceased
- Position: Forward

Senior career*
Years	Team	Apps	(Gls)
1927–1932	Vitória Setúbal		
1932–1939	Benfica		

International career
1930–1933	Portugal	2	(0)
- * Club domestic league appearances and goals

Luís Xavier Júnior (born 12 October 1907 in Setúbal), is a former Portuguese footballer who played for Vitória Setúbal and Benfica, as a forward.

== International career ==
Xavier gained 2 caps for the Portugal national team. He made his debut 8 June 1930 in Antwerp against Belgium in a 1-2 defeat.
