= Estádio do Lumiar =

Former multi-use stadium in Lisbon, Portugal

- Interactive map of Estádio do Lumiar
- Full name: Estádio do Lumiar
- Location: Lisbon, Portugal
- Owner: Sporting Clube de Portugal
- Operator: Sporting Clube de Portugal
- Capacity: 20,000

Construction
- Closed: 1956

Tenant
- Sporting Clube de Portugal

Estádio do Lumiar was a multi-use stadium in Lisbon, Portugal. It was initially used as the stadium of Sporting Clube de Portugal matches. It was replaced by the Estádio José Alvalade in 1956. The capacity of the stadium was 20,000 spectators.

== Portugal national team matches ==
The following national team matches were held in the stadium.

| # | Date | Score | Opponent | Competition |
|---|---|---|---|---|
| 1. | 17 December 1922 | 1–2 | Spain | Friendly |
| 2. | 15 May 1925 | 0–2 | Spain | Friendly |
| 3. | 18 June 1925 | 1–0 | Italy | Friendly |
| 4. | 30 December 1926 | 4–0 | France | Friendly |
| 5. | 8 January 1928 | 2–2 | Spain | Friendly |
| 6. | 1 April 1928 | 0–0 | Argentina | Friendly |
| 7. | 12 January 1930 | 1–0 | Czechoslovakia | Friendly |
| 8. | 31 May 1931 | 3–2 | Belgium | Friendly |
| 9. | 3 May 1932 | 3–2 | Yugoslavia | Friendly |
| 10. | 29 January 1933 | 1–0 | Hungary | Friendly |
| 11. | 18 March 1934 | 1–2 | Spain | World Cup 1934 qualification |
| 12. | 5 May 1935 | 3–3 | Spain | Friendly |
| 13. | 27 February 1936 | 1–3 | Germany | Friendly |
