= Domingos Lopes =

Portuguese footballer

Personal information
- Full name: Domingos António Lopes
- Date of birth: 23 August 1912
- Place of birth: Mina de São Domingos, Portugal
- Date of death: Deceased
- Position: Midfielder

Youth career
- 1927–1929: Lusitano VRSA

Senior career*
Years	Team	Apps	(Gls)
1929–1933	Lusitano VRSA		
1933–1938	Benfica		
1938–1939	Lusitano VRSA		

International career
1934	Portugal	2	(0)
- * Club domestic league appearances and goals

Domingos António Lopes (born 23 August 1912, date of death unknown) was a Portuguese footballer who played as forward. He was born in Mina de São Domingos.
