= Vítor Silva =

Portuguese footballer (1909–1982)

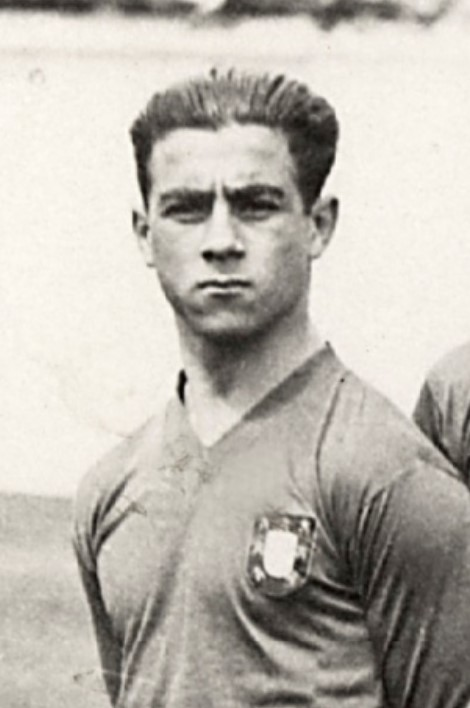
- Vítor Silva in 1928

Personal information
- Full name: Vítor Marcolino da Silva
- Date of birth: 20 February 1909
- Place of birth: Lisbon, Portugal
- Date of death: 21 July 1982 (aged 73)
- Position: Forward

Youth career
- 1921–1924: CIF

Senior career*
Years	Team	Apps	(Gls)
1926–1927	Carcavelinhos		
1927–1936	Benfica	79	(62)

International career
1928–1936	Portugal	19	(8)
- * Club domestic league appearances and goals

Vítor Marcolino da Silva (20 February 1909 – 21 July 1982) was a Portuguese footballer. Listed by Benfica, as one of the club's best forwards in history, Silva represented the club on 131 official games, scoring 108 goals.

== Club career ==
Born in Lisbon, Silva represented Club Internacional de Foot-ball in his early teens, but as club stopped competing; he moved to Hóquei CP, and later Carcavelinhos. In 1927, Benfica made his first paid transfer, when they paid for Silva move. He made his debut on 8 April 1928 in a loss against Sporting.

First deployed as an outside forward, he was quickly moved to the center, where his goalscoring abilities made him famous, using the flying header as trademark. Over the next seasons, he won three Campeonato de Portugal, the club first Primeira Liga, assuming captain armband from 1931 to 1934. He retired at only 27 years old, due to a thrombophlebitis, with a match in his honor on 13 September 1937 against Sporting.

Silva returned to his day job of coachtrimmer, also collaborating with Benfica football section for many years.

== International career ==
Silva had 19 caps for Portugal, scoring 8 goals. His first cap came at only 18, on 8 January 1928 in a 2–2 draw with Spain in Lisbon. The highlight of his international career was his presence at the 1928 Football Olympic Tournament, where he played in all the three matches, scoring three goals, one in each of them and being the top scorer for Portugal, who was eliminated at the quarter-finals by Egypt, due to a 1–2 loss. He represented the national team for the last time in a 1–3 loss to Germany in Lisbon on 27 February 1936, in a friendly game.

=== International goals ===
No.	Date	Venue	Opponent	Score	Result	Competition
1.	15 April 1928	Campo do Ameal, Porto, Portugal	Italy	3–1	4–1	Friendly
2.	27 May 1928	Olympic Stadium, Amsterdam, Netherlands	Chile	1–2	4–2	Football at the 1928 Summer Olympics
3.	29 May 1928	Old Stadion, Amsterdam, Netherlands	Yugoslavia	1–0	2–1	Football at the 1928 Summer Olympics
4.	4 June 1928	Olympic Stadium, Amsterdam, Netherlands	Egypt	1–2	1–2	Football at the 1928 Summer Olympics
5.	1 December 1929	San Siro, Milan, Italy	Italy	1–1	1–6	Friendly
6.	31 May 1931	Estádio do Lumiar, Lisbon, Portugal	Belgium	2–2	3–2	Friendly
7.	18 March 1934	Estádio do Lumiar, Lisbon, Portugal	Spain	1–0	1–2	1934 World Cup Qualification
8.	27 February 1936	Estádio do Lumiar, Lisbon, Portugal	Germany	1–3	1–3	Friendly

== Honours ==
Benfica

- Primeira Divisão: 1935–36
- Campeonato de Portugal: 1929–30, 1930–31, 1934–35
- Campeonato de Lisboa: 1932–33
