= Estádio da Tapadinha =

Football stadium in Lisbon, Portugal

Coordinates: 38.7097°N 9.1809°W

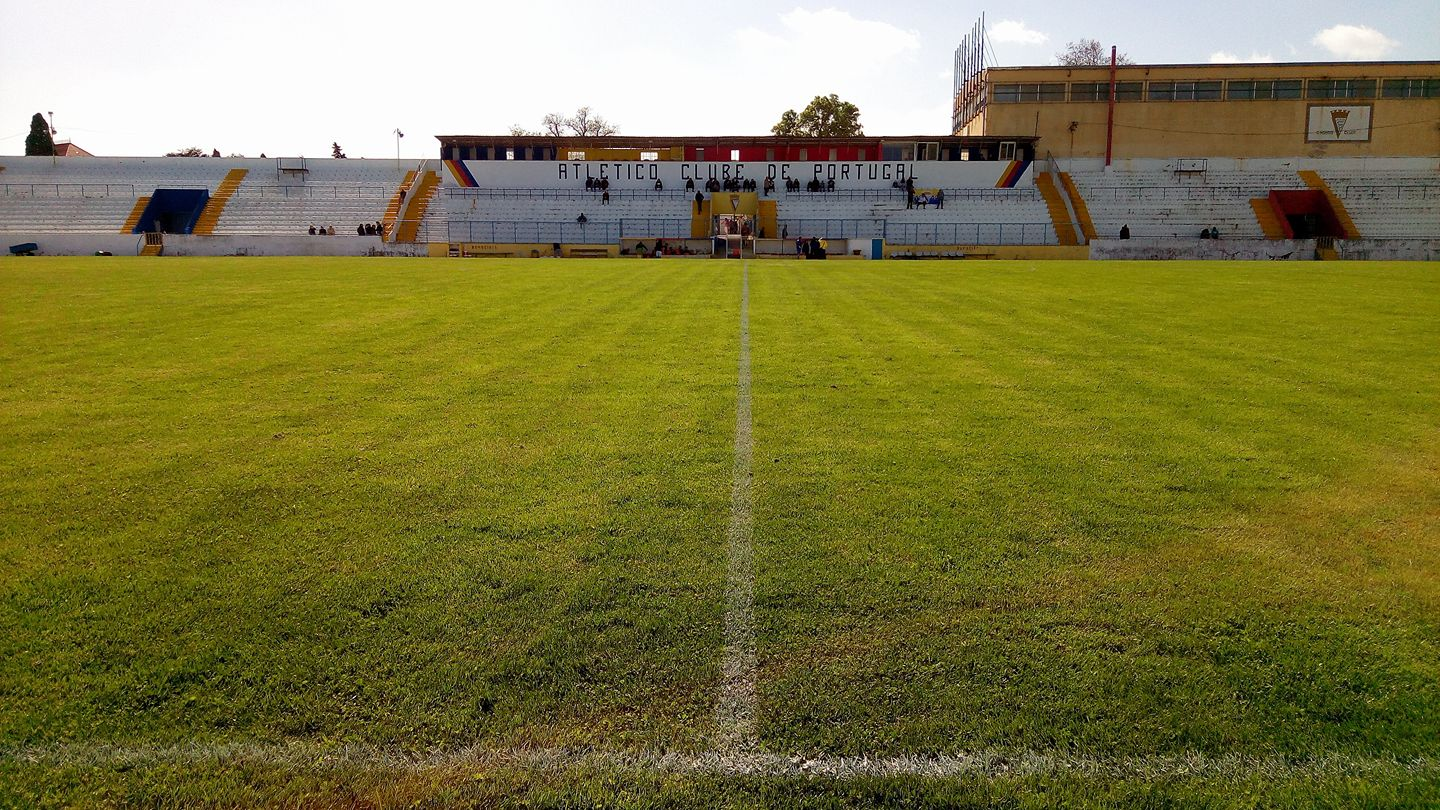
- Interactive map of Estádio da Tapadinha
- Full name: Estádio da Tapadinha
- Former names: Campo da Tapadinha
- Location: Lisbon, Portugal
- Owner: Atlético CP
- Capacity: 4,000
- Surface: Grass

Construction
- Built: 1926
- Opened: 27 June 1926; 100 years ago
- Renovated: 1945
- Architect: António Faustino

Tenants
- Atlético Clube de Portugal; Benfica (women)

Estádio da Tapadinha is a football stadium located in Lisbon, Portugal. With a seating capacity up to 4,000 people, it is the home ground of both Atlético Clube de Portugal and Benfica women's football team.

== Construction ==
Prior to 1925 Benfica lent its pitch to Carcavelinhos. That year, the Benfica Board decided to end the lease at the end of the season, forcing Carcavelinhos to find another pitch.

The Board of Carcavelinhos decided to construct its own pitch and locate it next to the Alvito quarry, in Alcântara.

António Faustino conceived the Campo da Tapadinha, with help from Sousa Lino and Rodrigues Graça. The construction was managed by the members and athletes of Carcavelinhos, and the field was inaugurated on 26 June 1926. The inaugural game was between Carcavelinhos and Sporting, and ended with a 4-3 victory for the "Lions". The first goal was made by Carlos Domingues, forward for Carcavelinhos.

== Increase of the stands ==
The idea for the transformation of the Campo da Tapadinha was put to the respective board by its president, Joaquim de Paiva e Silva, at a meeting held on 14 February 1944. The program of works was unanimously accepted, as well as the proposal for a possible purchase of the land.

The board that approved the preliminary project of the works elaborated by Engineer Manuel Travassos Valdez, was constituted as follows: Joaquim de Paiva e Silva, Lieutenant Alcino Pires, Alfredo Viçoso, Carlos Casanova, João do Carmo Miguel, António J. Marques and Franklin Marques .

To assist in the study and preparation of the project, a commission was set up, which included Joaquim de Paiva e Silva, Jaime Franco, Dr. Hermano Leite, Joaquim Nobre, Álvaro Cardoso, Amaral de Almeida, Armando Esteves and Álvaro de Azevedo. The preliminary project was presented to the press at a meeting held at the Club Secretariat on 28 April 1944.

The full compliance of the project, at that time, totaled 2.500.000 escudos, being included 10 more steps in the associates and regular stands, swimming pool, roof of the central stand, skating, etc.

The primitive project was entered in the Municipality of Lisbon on 17 October 1944, being later withdrawn for convenience of the expansion designed, to reenter with final character on 9 May 1945.

The rolling of the field began on 3 September 1945. Only the harvester, whose work was entrusted to the Agricultural Engineer João Marques de Almeida, imported in about 1.500.000 escudos.

The works, excluding the harvester, began on 5 July 1945.

The Executive Committee of the Works, elected on 6 March 1945, consisted of Joaquim de Paiva e Silva, Joaquim Nobre and Álvaro Cardoso, this as field director. The construction was entrusted to the author of the project - Engineer Travassos Valdez.

The inauguration of the Estádio da Tapadinha took place on 23 September 1945 in the presence of the Head of State, Marechal Óscar Carmona. A friendly game between Atlético and Sporting was disputed, that ended with the victory of the green-and-white by six balls to zero.

Its capacity has reached the 10000 places, being at the moment reduced to 4,000.

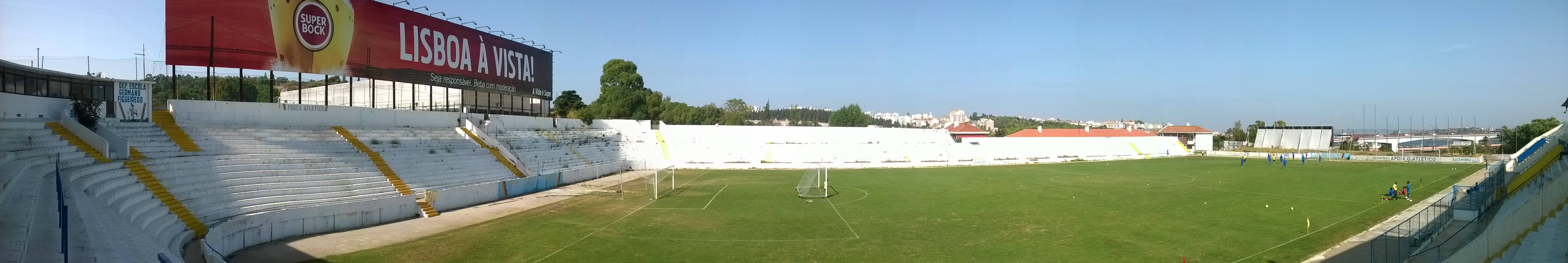
Panoramic photo of the Estádio da Tapadinha
