= União Foot-Ball Lisboa =

Portuguese football club

União Foot-Ball Lisboa (Lisbon Union FC in English), was a football club founded in Lisbon, Portugal, on 3 March 1910. In 1942 the club merged with Carcavelinhos Football Clube to form Atlético Clube de Portugal.
