= 1935–36 Campeonato da Liga =

2nd season of top-tier Portuguese football

Primeira Liga
- Season: 1935–36
- Champions: Benfica; 1st title
- Matches: 56
- Goals: 240 (4.29 per match)
- Biggest home win: Porto 10–1 Sporting CP
- Biggest away win: Sporting CP 6–1 Académica de Coimbra
- Highest scoring: Porto 10–1 Sporting CP

The 1935–36 Campeonato da Liga was the second season of top-tier football in Portugal. Although the first national competition (in a knock-out cup format) was still called Portuguese Championship, the Primeira Liga winners are considered the national champions.

== Overview ==
Location of teams in the 1935–36 Liga

It was contested by 8 teams, and S.L. Benfica won the championship.

== League standings ==
Pos	Team	Pld	W	D	L	GF	GA	GD	Pts
1	Benfica (C)	14	8	5	1	44	23	+21	21
2	Porto	14	9	2	3	50	18	+32	20
3	Sporting CP	14	8	2	4	41	31	+10	18
4	Belenenses	14	7	3	4	28	22	+6	17
5	Vitória de Setúbal	14	7	2	5	32	26	+6	16
6	Boavista	14	4	3	7	24	39	−15	11
7	Carcavelinhos	14	1	4	9	8	30	−22	6
8	Académica	14	1	1	12	13	51	−38	3

Source: rsssf.com
(C) Champions

== Results ==
Home \ Away	ACA	BEL	BEN	BOA	CAR	POR	SCP	VSE
Académica		1–2	2–6	0–2	3–0	2–4	1–6	0–2
Belenenses	8–0		3–1	3–0	2–0	2–1	1–2	1–2
Benfica	3–1	0–0		8–2	2–1	5–1	3–1	5–3
Boavista	4–1	1–1	2–2		4–0	0–3	2–2	4–1
Carcavelinhos	1–1	1–1	0–0	2–1		0–1	1–2	1–4
Porto	5–1	9–1	2–2	4–0	4–0		10–1	3–0
Sporting CP	3–0	4–1	2–4	9–1	1–1	3–2		3–1
Vitória de Setúbal	5–0	0–2	3–3	3–1	4–0	1–1	3–2	

Legend: Blue = home team win; Yellow = draw; Red = away team win.
