= 1936–37 Campeonato da Liga =

3rd season of top-tier Portuguese football

Primeira Liga
- Season: 1936–37
- Champions: Benfica; 2nd title
- Matches: 56
- Goals: 265 (4.73 per match)

The 1936–37 Campeonato da Liga was the third season of top-tier football in Portugal. Although the first national competition (in a knock-out cup format) was still called Portuguese Championship, the Primeira Liga winners are considered the national champions.

== Overview ==
Location of teams in the 1936–37 Liga

It was contested by 8 teams, and S.L. Benfica won the championship.

== League standings ==
Pos	Team	Pld	W	D	L	GF	GA	GD	Pts
1	Benfica (C)	14	12	0	2	57	13	+44	24
2	Belenenses	14	11	1	2	46	17	+29	23
3	Sporting CP	14	9	2	3	54	25	+29	20
4	Porto	14	6	2	6	31	31	0	14
5	Académica	14	5	1	8	24	30	−6	11
6	Carcavelinhos	14	4	1	9	16	35	−19	9
7	Vitória de Setúbal	14	3	1	10	18	45	−27	7
8	Leixões	14	2	0	12	19	69	−50	4

(C) Champions

== Results ==
Home \ Away	ACA	BEL	BEN	CAR	LEI	POR	SCP	VSE
Académica		3–5	1–3	1–2	4–2	2–1	1–2	2–0
Belenenses	2–3		1–0	3–0	9–0	3–0	1–1	5–0
Benfica	2–1	2–0		5–1	10–2	6–0	5–1	8–1
Carcavelinhos	1–0	1–2	1–3		4–0	0–0	1–2	1–0
Leixões	0–3	3–5	0–6	4–1		0–5	2–7	5–1
Porto	2–0	1–2	2–1	4–2	6–1		2–2	7–0
Sporting CP	7–2	2–3	1–4	8–0	4–0	9–1		5–1
Vitória de Setúbal	1–1	1–5	1–2	3–1	4–0	3–0	2–3	

Legend: Blue = home team win; Yellow = draw; Red = away team win.
