= Campeonato de Lisboa =

Football league in Portugal

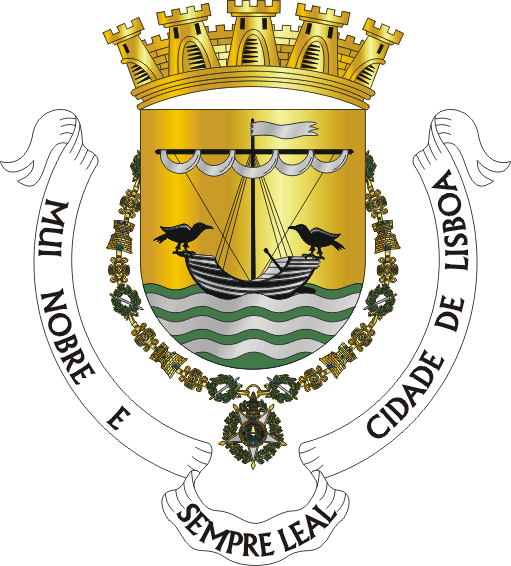
- Founded: 1906
- Folded: 1947
- Country: Portugal
- Number of clubs: 10
- Level on pyramid: 1 (1906–1921); 2 (1922–1934); 3 (1935–1947)
- Promotion to: Portuguese Second Division
- Domestic cup: Lisbon FA Cup
- Most championships: Sporting CP (18 titles)
- Website: https://www.fpf.pt/

The Campeonato de Lisboa (English: Championship of Lisbon) was a regional football league in Portugal situated at the third level of the Portuguese football league system. It started in 1906, before the Lisbon Football Association was created, and ran until 1947.

The Campeonato de Portugal was created in 1922 and reunited all of regional league winners in a playoff. From 1934, with the establishment of the Primeira Divisão and Segunda Divisão, it became the third level.

As time progressed, main clubs focused on national competitions, so the league folded in 1947.

== List of champions ==
Clubs
Season	Champions	Runners-up	Third place	Teams	Rounds /win
Campeonato de Lisboa (unofficial)
1906–07	Carcavelos	Benfica	Lisbon Cricket	4	5
1907–08	Carcavelos (2)	Sporting CP	Benfica	6	10
1908–09	Carcavelos (3)	Benfica	CIF	6	10
1909–10	Benfica	Carcavelos	CIF	6	10
Campeonato de Lisboa (official)
1910–11	CIF	Benfica	Sporting CP	7	11
1911–12	Benfica (2)	CIF	Sporting CP	4	6
1912–13	Benfica (3)	Sporting CP	Império	5	8
1913–14	Benfica (4)	CIF	Sporting CP	6	10
1914–15	Sporting CP	Benfica	Império	6	10
1915–16	Benfica (5)	Lisboa FC	Sporting CP	5	5
1916–17	Benfica (6)	Sporting CP	Império	5	7
1917–18	Benfica (7)	Sporting CP	Império	3	4
1918–19	Sporting CP (2)	Benfica	Vitória de Setúbal	5	10
1919–20	Benfica (8)	Belenenses	Sporting CP	6	9
1920–21	Casa Pia	Sporting CP	Belenenses	8	12
1921–22	Sporting CP (3)	Benfica	CIF	4	6
1922–23	Sporting CP (4)	Casa Pia (Note: As second division champions, Casa Pia earned the right to play a championship final with Sporting, which they lost 2–0.)	Benfica	6	9
1923–24	Vitória de Setúbal (Note: As second division champions, Vitória Setúbal earned the right to play a championship final with Casa Pia, which they won 1–0.)	Casa Pia	Sporting CP	6	9
1924–25	Sporting CP (5)	Belenenses	Benfica	5	8
1925–26	Belenenses	Sporting CP	Carcavelinhos	8	14
1926–27	Vitória de Setúbal (2)	Belenenses	Carcavelinhos	8	14
1927–28	Sporting CP (6)	Benfica	Belenenses	8	14
1928–29	Belenenses (2)	Benfica	Carcavelinhos FC	8	14
1929–30	Belenenses (3)	Benfica	Sporting CP	8	14
1930–31	Sporting CP (7)	Belenenses	União de Lisboa	8	14
1931–32	Belenenses (4)	Sporting CP	Benfica	10	13
1932–33	Benfica (9)	Belenenses	Sporting CP	10	17
1933–34	Sporting CP (8)	Carcavelinhos	Belenenses	10	8
1934–35	Sporting CP (9)	Benfica	Belenenses	6	12
1935–36	Sporting CP (10)	Benfica	Belenenses	6	11
1936–37	Sporting CP (11)	Benfica	Carcavelinhos	6	10
1937–38	Sporting CP (12)	Benfica	Belenenses	6	10
1938–39	Sporting CP (13)	Belenenses	Benfica	6	10
1939–40	Benfica (10)	Sporting CP	Belenenses	6	10
1940–41	Sporting CP (14)	Benfica	Belenenses	6	10
1941–42	Sporting CP (15)	Benfica	Belenenses	6	10
1942–43	Sporting CP (16)	Benfica	Belenenses	6	10
1943–44	Belenenses (5)	Benfica	Sporting CP	6	10
1944–45	Sporting CP (17)	Benfica	Belenenses	6	10
1945–46	Belenenses (6)	Sporting CP	Atlético CP	6	10
1946–47	Sporting CP (18)	Benfica	Belenenses	6	10

== Full table ==
	Team	S	G	W	D	L	G	Pts(2)	1	2	3	4	5	6	7	8	9	10
1	SL Benfica	41	404	250	61	93	1173-539	591	10	19	6	2	4					
2	Sporting CP	40	391	251	55	85	1109-506	581	18	9	9	2	2					
3	CF Belenenses	27	297	177	52	68	863-421	414	6	6	12	2						
4	Carcavelinhos FC	18	209	85	29	95	417-486	205		1	4	4	7	2				
5	Casa Pia	17	195	52	36	107	264-490	146	1	2		4		8	1	2		
6	União FC Lisboa	14	170	54	19	97	288-418	133			1	3	2	6	2			
7	CIF	16	108	38	9	61	180-250	95	1	2	3	3	4	2	1			
8	SC Império	17	135	23	13	99	147-398	69			4	4	4	1	1	3		
9	FC Barreirense	5	55	24	7	24	112-108	67				3	2					
10	Vitória de Setúbal	6	58	27	9	22	102- 92	63	2		1	2	1	1				
11	Carcavelos SC	4	30	26	2	2	154- 17	62	3	1								
12	Atlético CP	5	50	17	7	26	111-149	41			1	2	2					
13	Chelas	5	52	9	9	34	55-157	31							3		2	
14	Lisboa FC	6	48	7	2	39	54-195	30		1		2	2	1				
15	Unidos FC Lisboa	5	50	12	4	34	98-156	28				2	3					
16	Luso FC	3	25	7	5	13	34- 71	23							1	1		1
17	União Belenense	3	21	4	3	14	21- 48	21				1	1		1			
18	Bom Sucesso	5	60	4	6	50	49-259	16							1	3	1	
19	GD CUF	3	30	6	3	21	58-108	15					1	2				
20	GD Estoril Praia	2	20	5	2	13	41- 62	12				1		1				
21	Lisbon Cricket	2	9	4	1	4	15- 22	11			1	1						
22	Cruz Quebrada	2	17	4	1	12	19- 48	11				1	1					
23	SC Campo Ourique	1	8	2	2	4	10- 23	10				1						
24	Fósforos	4	38	3	2	33	47-201	8						3				1
25	Oriental	1	10	2	1	7	20- 36	5					1					
26	C.D. Palhavã	1	14	2	0	12	11- 46	4								1		
27	Cruz Negra	1	8	1	1	6	5- 31	3					1					
28	SG Sacavenense	1	9	1	1	7	8- 41	3										1
29	Gilman	1	8	0	0	8	2- 31	0						1				
30	Ajudense	1	7	0	0	7	0- 58	0						1				

Note: Barreirense and Vitória de Setúbal participated until 1927 when the Setúbal Football Association was created.
