= 1927 Campeonato de Portugal final =

- Event: 1926–27 Campeonato de Portugal
Belenenses	Vitória de Setúbal
3	0
- Date: 12 June 1927
- Venue: Estádio do Lumiar, Lisbon
- Referee: João dos Santos Júnior (Lisbon)

The 1927 Campeonato de Portugal Final was the final match of the 1926–27 Campeonato de Portugal, the 6th season of the Campeonato de Portugal, the Portuguese football knockout tournament, organized by the Portuguese Football Federation (FPF). The match was played on 12 June 1927 at the Estádio do Lumiar in Lisbon, and opposed Belenenses and Vitória de Setúbal. Belenenses defeated Vitória de Setúbal 3–0 to claim their first Campeonato de Portugal.

== Match ==
=== Details ===
12 June 1927

Belenenses	3–0	Vitória de Setúbal
Silva 63'; Marques 86', 89'

Estádio do Lumiar, Lisbon
Referee: João dos Santos Júnior (Lisbon)

Belenenses	Vitória de Setúbal

GK	(Portugal) Francisco Assis
DF	(Portugal) Júlio Marques
DF	(Portugal) Eduardo Azevedo
MF	(Portugal) Augusto Silva (c)
MF	(Portugal) César de Matos
MF	(Portugal) Joaquim d’Almeida
FW	(Portugal) José Luís
FW	(Portugal) Alfredo Ramos
FW	(Portugal) Silva Marques
FW	(Portugal) Fernando António
FW	(Portugal) Pepe
Manager:
(Portugal) Artur José Pereira

GK	(Portugal) Artur Camolas
DF	(Portugal) Francisco Silva
DF	(Portugal) Anibal José
MF	(Portugal) Matias Carlos
MF	(Portugal) Augusto José
MF	(Portugal) Isidoro Rufino (c)
FW	(Portugal) Francisco Nazaré
FW	(Portugal) João Santos
FW	(Portugal) Octávio Cambalacho
FW	(Portugal) Armando Martins
FW	(Portugal) Eduardo Augusto
Manager:
(England) Arthur John

1926–27 Campeonato de Portugal Winners
Belenenses
1st Title

Match officials

- Assistant referees:
- Fourth official:

Match rules

- 90 minutes.
