= Portugal national football team results (1921–1939) =

This page is a list of all the matches that Portugal national football team has played between 1921 and 1939. Between their first match in 1921 and 1939, when competitive football stopped because of the Second World War, Portugal played in 42 matches, resulting in 13 victories, 7 draws, 22 defeats. Throughout this period they played in the 1928 Olympics, reaching the quarter-finals where they got knocked out by Egypt.

== Results ==
42 matches played:

Key
Colour (with score)	Meaning
	Defeat
	Draw
	Win

== 1920s ==
18 December 1921 Friendly	Spain	3 – 1	Portugal	(Spain) Campo de O'Donnell, Madrid
15:00 (UTC+0:00)	Meana 20'; Alcántara 23', 50'	Report	Alberto Augusto 75'	Attendance: 14,000; Referee: (Belgium) Charles Barette

17 December 1922 Friendly	Portugal	1 – 2	Spain	(Portugal) Estádio do Lumiar, Lisbon
14:30 (UTC+0:00)	Gonçalves 37'	Report	61' Piera; 82' Monjardín	Attendance: 25,000; Referee: (England) Thomas Balvay

16 December 1923 Friendly	Spain	3 – 0	Portugal	(Spain) Campo de la Reina Victoria, Sevilla
15:00 (UTC+0:00)	Zabala 14', 57', 70'	Report		Attendance: 10,000; Referee: (Belgium) Paul Putz

17 May 1925 Friendly	Portugal	0 – 2	Spain	(Portugal) Estádio do Lumiar, Lisbon
16:30 (UTC+0:00)		Report	8' Carmelo; 17' Piera	Attendance: 17,000; Referee: (France) Georges Vallat

18 June 1925 Friendly	Portugal	1 – 0	Italy	(Portugal) Estádio do Lumiar, Lisbon
18:30 (UTC+0:00)	João Francisco 39'	Report		Attendance: 15,000; Referee: (Belgium) Georges Theuerkauff

24 January 1926 Friendly	Portugal	1 – 1	Czechoslovakia Amateur	(Portugal) Campo do Ameal, Porto
15:00 (UTC+0:00)	João Santos 59'	Report	75' Jelínek	Attendance: 12,000; Referee: (Belgium) Gaston Degotte

18 April 1926 Friendly	France	4 – 2	Portugal	(France) Stade des Ponts Jumeaux, Toulouse
15:00 (UTC+1:00)	Salvano 16'; Brunel 40', 65'; Bonello 56'	Report	35' Augusto Silva; 86' João Santos	Attendance: 16,000; Referee: (Switzerland) Ed Dizerens

26 December 1926 Friendly	Portugal	3 – 3	Hungary	(Portugal) Campo do Ameal, Porto
	João Santos 40'; Severo Tiago 49'; José Martins 60'	Report	9', 74' Holzbauer; 22' Braun	Attendance: 10,000; Referee: (Spain) José Llovera
Note: João dos Santos set the goal scoring record for Portugal (3 goals)

16 March 1927 Friendly	Portugal	4 – 0	France	(Portugal) Estádio do Lumiar, Lisbon
16:30 (UTC+0:00)	Pepe 7', 44'; José Martins 49', 74'	Report		Attendance: 15,000; Referee: (Spain) Luis Collina Álvarez

17 April 1927 Friendly	Italy	3 – 1	Portugal	(Italy) Stadio Filadelfia, Turin
15:00 (UTC+1:00)	Levratto 20', 70'; Baloncieri 48'	Report	82' Cambalacho	Attendance: 6,000; Referee: (Czechoslovakia) František Cejnar

29 May 1927 Friendly (Note: In May 1927, Spain played a friendly against Portugal in Madrid on the same day as they played Italy in Rome. The squad for the Italy game was more experienced and considered to be stronger, while several players in the Portugal match made their debuts; consequently the Spain team is considered to have been equivalent to its B team (although they won their match while the A team lost theirs) and thus not a full international, although the match is included in some media articles relating to the rivalry and in some statistical tallies of caps for the players involved.)	Spain B	2 – 0	Portugal	(Spain) Estadio Metropolitano, Madrid
17:30 (UTC+1:00)	Moraleda 60'; Valderrama 80'			Attendance: 30,000; Referee: (England) Thomas Crewe

8 January 1928 Friendly	Portugal	2 – 2	Spain	(Portugal) Estádio do Lumiar, Lisbon
14:30 (UTC+0:00)	José Martins 25' (pen.); João Santos 84'	Report	30' (pen.) Zaldúa; 58' Goiburu	Attendance: 30,000; Referee: (England) Albert Prince-Cox

1 April 1928 Friendly	Portugal	0 – 0	Argentina	(Portugal) Estádio do Lumiar, Lisbon
14:30 (UTC+0:00)		Report		Attendance: 20,000; Referee: (Spain) Ricardo Rocamora

15 April 1928 Friendly	Portugal	4 – 1	Italy	(Portugal) Campo do Ameal, Porto
15:30 (UTC)	Mota 20', 27', 77'; Silva 57'	Report	38' Libonatti	Attendance: 15,000; Referee: (Belgium) Henri Christophe

29 April 1928 Friendly	France	1 – 1	Portugal	(France) Parc des Princes, Paris
15:00 (UTC+1:00)	Nicolas 44'	Report	24' Armando Martins	Attendance: 25,000; Referee: (England) Stanley Rous

27 May 1928 (Netherlands) Football at the 1928 Summer Olympics Preliminary round	Portugal	4 – 2	Chile	(Netherlands) Olympic Stadium, Amsterdam
15:00 (UTC+1:20)	Vítor Silva 38'; Pepe 40', 50'; Mota 63'	Report	14' Saavedra; 30' Carbonell	Attendance: 2,309; Referee: (Egypt) Yussuf Muhammad

29 May 1928 (Netherlands) Football at the 1928 Summer Olympics Round of 16	Portugal	2 – 1	Yugoslavia	(Netherlands) Old Stadion, Amsterdam
16:00 (+1:20)	Vítor Silva 25'; Augusto Silva 90'	Report	31' Bonačić	Attendance: 1,226; Referee: (Germany) Alfred Birlem

4 June 1928 (Netherlands) Football at the 1928 Summer Olympics Quarter-finals	Egypt	2 – 1	Portugal	(Netherlands) Olympic Stadium, Amsterdam
19:00 (UTC+1:20)	Mahmoud Mokhtar 15'; Riadh 48'	Report	76' Vítor Silva	Attendance: 3,448; Referee: (Italy) Giovanni Mauro

17 March 1929 Friendly	Spain	5 – 0	Portugal	(Spain) Estadio de la Exposición, Seville
16:00 (UTC+0:00)	Rubio 2', 9', 20'; Padrón 30', 45'	Report		Attendance: 14,000; Referee: (Belgium) John Langenus

24 March 1929 Friendly	France	2 – 0	Portugal	(France) Stade Olympique Yves-du-Manoir, Colombes
15:00 (UTC+0:00)	Nicolas 49'; Galey 80'	Report		Attendance: 25,000; Referee: (Belgium) Raphaël van Praag

1 December 1929 Friendly	Italy	6 – 1	Portugal	(Italy) San Siro, Milan
14:30 (UTC+1:00)	Mihalic 6', 88'; Orsi 36', 37'; Baloncieri 51'; Sallustro 77'	Report	29' Vítor Silva	Attendance: 25,000; Referee: (Belgium) Louis Baert
Note: Vítor Silva set the goal scoring record for Portugal (5 goals)

== 1930s ==
12 January 1930 Friendly	Portugal	1 – 0	Czechoslovakia	(Portugal) Estádio do Lumiar, Lisbon
14:00 (UTC)	Pepe 61'	Report		Attendance: 25,000; Referee: (Spain) Pedro Escartín

23 February 1930 Friendly	Portugal	2 – 0	France	(Portugal) Campo do Ameal, Porto
15:15 (UTC)	Pepe 44', 70'	Report		Attendance: 20,000; Referee: (Belgium) John Langenus
Note: Pepe set the goal scoring record for Portugal (7 goals)

8 June 1930 Friendly	Belgium	2 – 1	Portugal	(Belgium) Bosuilstadion, Antwerp
16:00 (UTC+1:00)	Vanderbauwhede 75'; Bastin 83'	Report	43' Armando Martins	Attendance: 15,000; Referee: (Netherlands) Johannes Mutters

30 November 1930 Friendly	Portugal	0 – 1	Spain	(Portugal) Campo do Ameal, Porto
15:00 (UTC)		Report	16' Peña	Attendance: 20,000; Referee: (Belgium) Louis Baert

12 April 1931 Friendly	Portugal	0 – 2	Italy	(Portugal) Estádio do Lima, Porto
16:00 (UTC+1:00)		Report	33' Orsi; 41' Ferrari	Attendance: 15,000; Referee: (Spain) José Llovera

31 May 1931 Friendly	Portugal	3 – 2	Belgium	(Portugal) Estádio do Lumiar, Lisbon
15:30 (UTC+1:00)	Armando Martins 15'; Vítor Silva 84'; Pinga 88'	Report	25' Van Beeck; 31' Hellemans	Attendance: 20,000; Referee: (Spain) Ramón Melcón

3 May 1932 Friendly	Portugal	3 – 2	Yugoslavia	(Portugal) Estádio do Lumiar, Lisbon
17:30 (UTC+1:00)	Pinga 23'; Valadas 42'; Soeiro 65'	Report	34', 85' Vujadinović	Attendance: 30,000; Referee: (Spain) Pedro Escartín

29 January 1933 Friendly	Portugal	1 – 0	Hungary	(Portugal) Estádio do Lumiar, Lisbon
15:00 (UTC)	Pinga 36'	Report		Attendance: 15,000; Referee: (Spain) Ramón Melcón

2 April 1933 Friendly	Spain	3 – 0	Portugal	(Spain) Balaídos, Vigo
16:30 (UTC)	Larrínaga 22'; Elícegui 59', 65'	Report		Attendance: 20,000; Referee: (Belgium) John Langenus

11 Mar 1934 (Italy) 1934 World Cup Qualification	Spain	9 – 0	Portugal	(Spain) Estadio Chamartín, Madrid
16:00 (UTC)	Chacho 3'; Lángara 10', 12' (pen.), 46', 77', 86'; Regueiro 68', 76'; Ventolrà 75'	Report		Attendance: 50,000; Referee: (Belgium) Raphaël Van Praag
Note: Heaviest defeat of the Portugal football team at the time

18 March 1934 (Italy) 1934 World Cup Qualification	Portugal	1 – 2	Spain	(Portugal) Estádio do Lumiar, Lisbon
16:00 (UTC)	Vítor Silva 11'	Report	13', 25' Lángara	Attendance: 35,000; Referee: (Belgium) Raphaël Van Praag

5 May 1935 Friendly	Portugal	3 – 3	Spain	(Portugal) Estádio do Lumiar, Lisbon
16:45 (UTC+1:00)	Soeiro 61'; Pinga 70', 77' (pen.)	Report	23', 38' Lángara; 58' Gorostiza	Attendance: 50,000; Referee: (France) Roger Conrié

26 January 1936 Friendly	Portugal	2 – 3	Austria	(Portugal) Estádio do Lima, Porto
15:00 (UTC)	Nunes 47'; Soeiro 61'	Report	25' Zischek; 41' Binder; 50' Bican	Attendance: 23,000; Referee: (Spain) Ramón Melcón

27 February 1936 Friendly	Portugal	1 – 3	Germany	(Portugal) Estádio do Lumiar, Lisbon
16:30 (UTC)	Vítor Silva 64'	Report	20' Hohmann; 48' Kitzinger; 52' Lehner	Attendance: 25,000; Referee: (Spain) Pedro Escartín
Note: Vítor Silva set the goal scoring record for Portugal (8 goals)

28 November 1937 Friendly (Note: Following the outbreak of the Spanish Civil War in 1936, no official matches were played by Spain until 1941. The vast majority of the squad in 1936 either originated from the Basque provinces, or played for FC Barcelona in Catalonia, both of which were initially within Republican territory in the conflict. The Basque players formed their own quasi-national team and left Spain to play a long series of exhibition matches on tour around Eastern Europe and Latin America to provide funds and exposure for local causes, and Barcelona did likewise; most of the players in both teams never returned. Back in Spain, as the Nationalist faction took control of more of the country, General Franco saw the opportunity to use football as a positive propaganda tool, and arranged for a match to be played in his home region of Galicia against Portugal, whose leader Salazar was supportive of his side. Recognition as a friendly game was granted by FIFA at short notice and the match took place in Vigo in November 1937. In contrast to Portugal's settled squad, the Spain pool was hastily assembled from the best available players in Nationalist areas, and Portugal won for their first victory over their neighbours. A return match was arranged for the following January in Lisbon, also won by Portugal, and which attracted attention when three local players refused to give the fascist salute before kick-off; they were initially imprisoned but were soon released due to the political influence held by the hierarchy of the club they played for: Belenenses.)	Spain Nationalist	1 – 2	Portugal	(Spain) Balaídos, Vigo
15:00 (UTC+0:00)	Gallart 76'		59' Pinga; 75' Valadas	Attendance: 50,000; Referee: (Italy) Rinaldo Barlassina

9 January 1938 Friendly	Portugal	4 – 0	Hungary	(Portugal) Estádio JM Soares, Lisbon
15:00 (UTC)	Cruz 14', 15'; Espírito Santo 48'; Soeiro 60'	Report		Attendance: 10,000; Referee: (France) Georges Capdeville

30 January 1938 Friendly	Portugal	1 – 0	Spain Nationalist	(Portugal) Estádio JM Soares, Lisbon
15:00 (UTC)	Pinga 40'			Attendance: 25,000; Referee: (Italy) Francesco Mattea

24 April 1938 Friendly	Germany	1 – 1	Portugal	(Germany) Waldstadion, Frankfurt
15:00 (UTC+1:00)	Siffling 75'	Report	18' Pinga	Attendance: 54,000; Referee: (Italy) Rinaldo Barlassina

1 May 1938 (France) 1938 FIFA World Cup Qualification	Switzerland	2 – 1	Portugal	(Italy) Arena Civica, Milan
16:00 (UTC+1:00)	Aeby 23'; Lajo 28'	Report	73' (pen.) Peyroteo	Attendance: 20,000; Referee: (Italy) Francesco Mattea

6 November 1938 Friendly	Switzerland	1 – 0	Portugal	(Switzerland) Stade Olympique, Lausanne
15:00 (UTC+1:00)	Aeby 47'	Report		Attendance: 20,000; Referee: (France) Georges Capdeville

12 February 1939 Friendly	Portugal	2 – 4	Switzerland	(Portugal) Estádio JM Soares, Lisbon
15:00 (UTC)	Cruz 15'; Soeiro 47'	Report	3', 19' Aeby; 60' Bickel; 62' Sydler	Attendance: 28,000; Referee: (France) Georges Capdeville
