= Portugal national football team results =

For lists of Portugal national football team results every twenty years see:

- Portugal national football team results (1921–39)
- Portugal national football team results (1940–59)
- Portugal national football team results (1960–79)
- Portugal national football team results (1980–99)
- Portugal national football team results (2000–19)
- Portugal national football team results (2020–present)
