= Artur Camolas =

Portuguese footballer

Personal information
- Full name: Artur Augusto Camolas Júnior
- Date of birth: 15 March 1904
- Place of birth: Portugal
- Date of death: Deceased
- Position: Goalkeeper

Senior career*
Years	Team	Apps	(Gls)
1926–1932	Vitória Setúbal		

International career
1927–1931	Portugal	4	(0)
- * Club domestic league appearances and goals

Artur Augusto Camolas Júnior (born 15 March 1904 - deceased) was a Portuguese footballer who played as a goalkeeper.

== Football career ==
Camolas gained 4 caps for Portugal and made his debut against France on 16 March 1927 in Lisbon, in a 4–0 victory.
