= List of Portugal national football team managers =

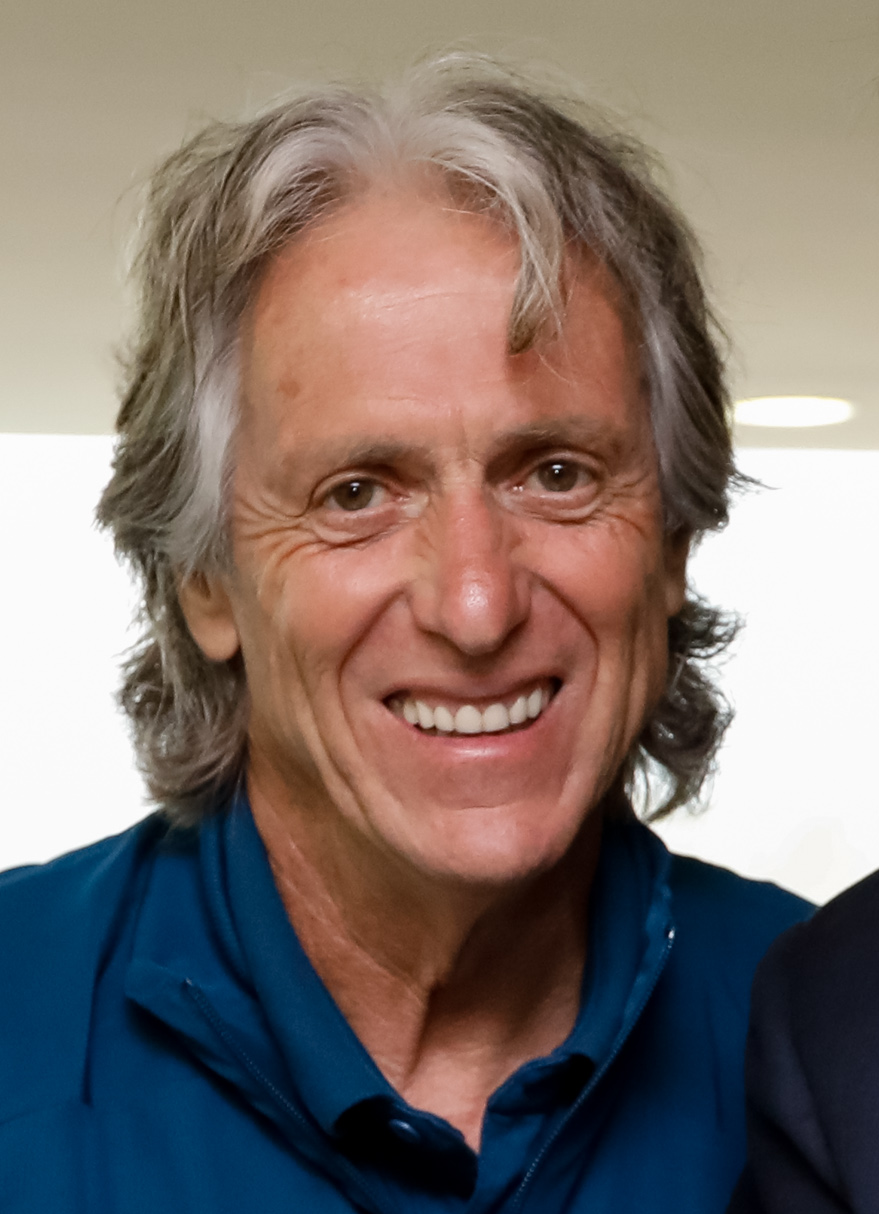
Jorge Jesus, the current coach.

The first successful manager with Portugal was a Brazilian, Otto Glória. After making himself known as manager in the technical area of Benfica in particular, he took on the reins of the Portuguese side in 1964. In two years, he won 15 of the 20 matches in which Portugal participated. Led by Eusébio at his peak, Portugal qualified for the FIFA World Cup for the first time and finished in third place in the 1966 tournament.

Luiz Felipe Scolari was appointed in 2003 after leading Brazil to victory at the 2002 FIFA World Cup. Under Scolari's leadership, Portugal reached the UEFA Euro 2004 final, where they lost to Greece. Two years later, Portugal reached the semi-finals of the 2006 FIFA World Cup, losing to France before finishing fourth. Scolari departed following Portugal's quarter-final elimination at UEFA Euro 2008.

Appointed in 2014, Fernando Santos managed Portugal for eight years. He guided the national team to its first major international trophy at UEFA Euro 2016, followed by victory in the 2019 UEFA Nations League Finals. Santos left his position on 15 December 2022, following Portugal's elimination by Morocco in the quarter-finals of the 2022 FIFA World Cup.

On 9 January 2023, Roberto Martínez was appointed head coach. He became the first Portugal manager whose nationality was neither Portuguese nor Brazilian. Under Martínez, Portugal won the 2025 UEFA Nations League Finals.

Jorge Jesus succeeded Martínez in July 2026.

== List ==
The following table provides a summary of the records of Portugal national football team managers, including their results in the FIFA World Cup, FIFA Confederations Cup, UEFA European Championship and UEFA Nations League Finals.

The winning percentage is calculated by dividing the number of matches won by the total number of matches played, multiplied by 100. Drawn matches are not counted as wins.

As of 31 October 2026

Manager	Nat	From	To	P	W	D	L	Win %	Tournaments
Committee	(Portugal)	18 December 1921	16 December 1923	3	0	0	3	0.0%	—
Ribeiro dos Reis	(Portugal)	15 May 1925	18 April 1926	4	1	1	2	25.0%	—
Cândido de Oliveira	(Portugal)	26 December 1926	24 March 1929	13	4	4	5	30.8%	—
Maia Loureiro	(Portugal)	1 December 1929	1 December 1929	1	0	0	1	0.0%	—
Laurindo Grijó	(Portugal)	12 January 1930	30 November 1930	4	2	0	2	50.0%	—
Tavares da Silva (1)	(Portugal)	12 April 1931	31 May 1931	2	1	0	1	50.0%	—
Salvador do Carmo (1)	(Portugal)	3 May 1932	2 April 1933	3	2	0	1	66.7%	—
Ribeiro dos Reis (2)	(Portugal)	11 February 1934	18 March 1934	2	0	0	2	0.0%	—
Cândido de Oliveira (2)	(Portugal)	5 May 1935	11 March 1945	15	4	3	8	26.7%	—
Tavares da Silva (2)	(Portugal)	6 May 1945	25 May 1947	9	4	1	4	44.4%	—
Virgílio Paula	(Portugal)	23 November 1947	23 May 1948	3	1	0	2	33.3%	—
Armando Sampaio	(Portugal)	27 February 1947	22 May 1949	4	1	1	2	25.0%	—
Salvador do Carmo (2)	(Portugal)	2 April 1950	21 May 1950	4	0	2	2	0.0%	—
Tavares da Silva (3)	(Portugal)	8 April 1951	17 June 1951	4	0	1	3	0.0%	—
Cândido de Oliveira (3)	(Portugal)	20 April 1952	14 December 1952	3	0	1	2	0.0%	—
Salvador do Carmo (3)	(Portugal)	26 September 1953	28 November 1954	5	1	2	2	20.0%	—
Fernando Vaz	(Portugal)	19 December 1954	2 May 1955	1	0	0	1	0.0%	—
Tavares da Silva (4)	(Portugal)	4 May 1955	16 June 1957	15	5	2	8	33.3%	—
José Maria Antunes (1)	(Portugal)	22 December 1957	22 May 1960	12	4	0	8	33.3%	—
Armando Ferreira (1)	(Portugal)	19 March 1961	4 June 1961	3	1	1	1	33.3%	—
Fernando Peyroteo	(Portugal)	8 October 1961	25 October 1961	2	0	0	2	0.0%	—
Armando Ferreira (2)	(Portugal)	6 May 1962	17 May 1962	3	0	0	3	0.0%	—
José Maria Antunes (2)	(Portugal)	7 November 1962	7 June 1964	10	4	1	5	40.0%	—
Otto Glória (1)	(Brazil)	15 November 1964	13 November 1966	20	15	2	3	75.0%	1966 FIFA World Cup – Third place
José Gomes da Silva (1)	(Portugal)	27 March 1967	17 December 1967	6	2	3	1	33.3%	—
José Maria Antunes (3)	(Portugal)	30 June 1968	10 December 1969	9	1	3	5	11.1%	—
José Gomes da Silva (2)	(Portugal)	10 May 1970	21 November 1971	7	3	1	3	42.9%	—
José Augusto	(Portugal)	29 March 1972	14 November 1973	15	9	4	2	60.0%	—
José Maria Pedroto	(Portugal)	3 April 1974	22 December 1976	15	6	4	5	40.0%	—
Júlio Cernadas Pereira (1)	(Portugal)	30 March 1977	8 March 1978	5	3	1	1	60.0%	—
Mário Wilson	(Portugal)	20 September 1978	26 March 1980	10	5	2	3	50.0%	—
Júlio Cernadas Pereira (2)	(Portugal)	24 September 1980	5 May 1982	18	6	3	9	33.3%	—
Otto Glória (2)	(Brazil)	22 September 1982	8 June 1983	7	3	1	3	42.9%	—
Fernando Cabrita	(Portugal)	21 September 1983	23 June 1984	9	5	2	2	55.6%	1984 UEFA European Championship – Semi-finals
José Augusto Torres	(Portugal)	6 September 1984	11 June 1986	17	8	1	8	47.1%	1986 FIFA World Cup – Group stage
Ruy Seabra	(Portugal)	12 October 1986	29 March 1987	6	1	4	1	16.7%	—
Júlio Cernadas Pereira (3)	(Portugal)	23 September 1987	15 November 1989	10	6	3	1	60.0%	—
Artur Jorge (1)	(Portugal)	1 January 1990	30 June 1991	8	4	3	1	50.0%	—
Carlos Queiroz (1)	(Portugal)	4 September 1991	17 November 1993	21	10	6	5	47.6%	—
Nelo Vingada	(Portugal)	14 December 1993	30 June 1994	2	0	2	0	0.0%	—
António Oliveira (1)	(Portugal)	1 July 1994	31 July 1996	22	13	5	4	59.1%	1996 UEFA European Championship – Quarter-finals
Artur Jorge (2)	(Portugal)	1 August 1996	30 November 1997	12	5	5	2	41.7%	—
Humberto Coelho	(Portugal)	15 December 1997	31 July 2000	24	16	4	4	66.7%	2000 UEFA European Championship – Semi-finals
António Oliveira (2)	(Portugal)	1 August 2000	31 July 2002	22	13	5	4	59.1%	2002 FIFA World Cup – Group stage
Agostinho Oliveira (caretaker)	(Portugal)	22 August 2002	10 January 2003	4	2	2	0	50.0%	—
Luiz Felipe Scolari	(Brazil)	11 January 2003	19 June 2008	74	42	18	14	56.8%	2004 UEFA European Championship – Runner-up; 2006 FIFA World Cup – Fourth place 2008 UEFA European Championship – Quarter-finals
Carlos Queiroz (2)	(Portugal)	11 July 2008	9 September 2010	28	15	9	4	53.6%	2010 FIFA World Cup – Round of 16
Paulo Bento	(Portugal)	21 September 2010	11 September 2014	47	26	12	9	55.3%	2012 UEFA European Championship – Semi-finals; 2014 FIFA World Cup – Group stage
Fernando Santos	(Portugal)	23 September 2014	15 December 2022	109	67	23	19	61.5%	2016 UEFA European Championship – Champions; 2017 FIFA Confederations Cup – Third place 2018 FIFA World Cup – Round of 16; 2019 UEFA Nations League Finals – Champions; 2020 UEFA European Championship – Round of 16; 2022 FIFA World Cup – Quarter-finals
Roberto Martínez	(Spain)	9 January 2023	6 July 2026	45	30	9	6	66.7%	2024 UEFA European Championship – Quarter-finals; 2025 UEFA Nations League Finals – Champions; 2026 FIFA World Cup – Round of 16
Jorge Jesus	(Portugal)	10 July 2026	Present	4	4	0	0	100.0%	—
