= Silva Marques =

Portuguese footballer

Personal information
- Full name: Francisco da Silva Marques
- Date of birth: 11 March 1905
- Place of birth: Portugal
- Date of death: 9 May 1968 (aged 63)
- Position: Forward

Senior career*
Years	Team	Apps	(Gls)
1926–1936	Belenenses		
1936–1937	Lusit. Évora		

International career
1927–1930	Portugal	3	(0)
- * Club domestic league appearances and goals

Francisco da Silva Marques (11 March 1905 – 9 May 1968) was a Portuguese footballer who played as forward.

== Football career ==
Silva Marques gained 3 caps for Portugal and made his debut against France in Lisbon 16 March 1927, in a 4-0 win.
