= Anibal José =

Portuguese footballer

Personal information
- Full name: Anibal José
- Date of birth: 29 March 1904
- Place of birth: Portugal
- Date of death: 8 January 1976 (aged 71)
- Position: Midfielder

Senior career*
Years	Team	Apps	(Gls)
1929/1930 – 1931/1932	Benfica		
1934/1935	Vitória Setúbal (I)		

International career
1929–1932	Portugal	4	(0)
- * Club domestic league appearances and goals

Anibal José (29 March 1904 – 8 January 1976) was a Portuguese footballer who played for Benfica, Vitória Setúbal and the Portugal national team, as midfielder.

== International career ==
José made his debut for the national team 1 December 1929 against Italy in a heavy 1-6 defeat in Milan. He totally gained 4 caps and was a non-playing member of Portugal's 1928 Olympic Squad.
