= José Maria Antunes =

Portuguese football manager (1913–1991)

Personal information
- Full name: José Maria Antunes Jr.
- Date of birth: 27 July 1913
- Place of birth: Sobral da Ceira – Coimbra, Portugal
- Date of death: 21 March 1991 (aged 77)
- Position: Defender

Senior career*
Years	Team	Apps	(Gls)
1934–1943	Académico de Viseu	95	(0)
Total		95	(0)

Managerial career
- 1946–1947: Académico de Viseu
- 1957–1960: Portugal
- 1962–1964: Portugal
- 1964–1965: Torreense
- 1968–1969: Portugal
- * Club domestic league appearances and goals

José Maria Antunes (27 July 1913 – 12 March 1991) was a Portuguese football player and manager who had three spells as manager of the Portugal national team.
