= Pepe Soares =

Portuguese footballer (1908–1931)

Pepe
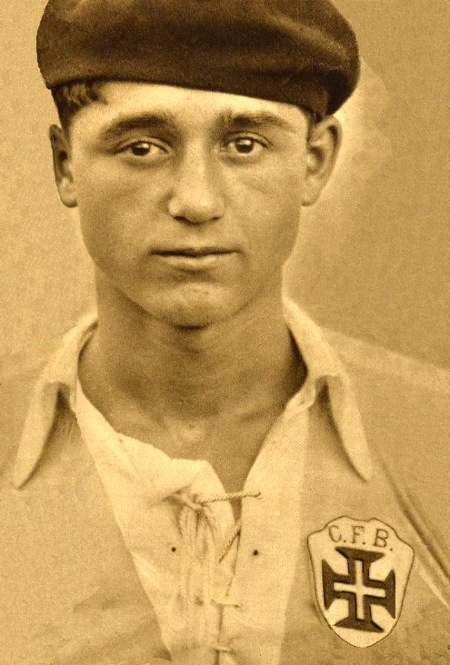

Personal information
- Full name: José Manoel Soares
- Date of birth: 30 January 1908
- Place of birth: Belém, Lisbon, Portugal
- Date of death: 24 October 1931 (aged 23)
- Position: Forward

Senior career*
Years	Team	Apps	(Gls)
1926–1931	CF Belenenses	140	(??)

International career
1927-1930	Portugal	14	(7)
- * Club domestic league appearances and goals

José Manoel Soares (30 January 1908 – 24 October 1931), known as Pepe, was a Portuguese footballer. During his brief career, he played as an inside forward for CF Belenenses and the Portugal national football team, and was considered by many to be Portugal's best player of the time. Despite the young age at which he died, Pépe won two Portuguese Championships (Taça de Portugal) and three Lisbon Championships (Campeonato de Lisboa).

== Early life ==
José Manuel Soares Louro, better known as "Pepe", was born to a poor family at No. 17 Rua do Embaixador, in Belém, western Lisbon, on 30 January 1908.

== Club career ==
At the age of 18, Pepe made his first appearance for Belenenses on 28 February 1926 against Benfica, entering the match in the 75th minute with Belenenses down 4–1. In the subsequent 13 minutes, Belenenses scored three goals, tying the contest at 4–4. In the final minute, Benfica were called for a foul in the penalty area. With none of the Belenenses players stepping forward to take the penalty, Pepe, the rookie, was called in by his captain to take the shot. He did not fail. Belenenses won 4–5, giving birth to the expression "a quarter-hour to Belenenses," an expression still used in Portugal.

Soares played 140 games in his club career, all with FC Belenenses. In the 1929/30 Lisbon Championship season, Pépe played 14 games, scoring 36 goals (a stunning average of 2.57 goals per game). This included a single-game record of 10 goals scored in a 12–1 victory over Bom Sucesso (a record that stands to this day).

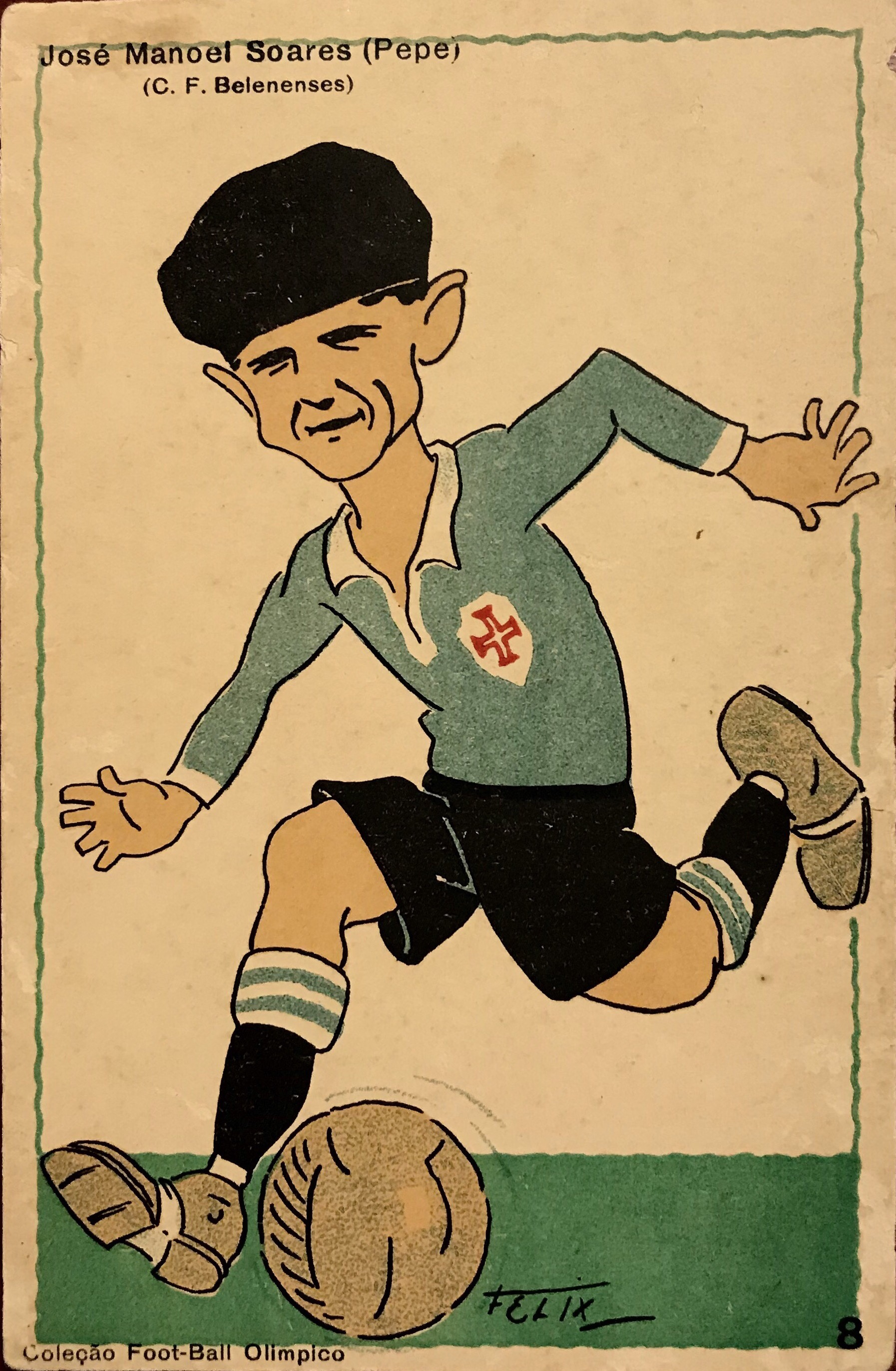
Caricature postcard of CF Belenenses star "Pépe" Soares

== International career ==
Pepe made his international debut for Portugal at the age of 19, in a friendly against France played in Lisbon on 16 March 1927. Pepe scored two goals in his national side's 4–0 victory. In total, he played 14 games for the Portugal national team, scoring 7 goals. Pépe also played for Portugal at the 1928 Olympic Games football tournament in Amsterdam. Portugal defeated Chile (4–2) and Yugoslavia (2–1), but subsequently lost to Egypt (1–2) in the quarter-finals. Egypt later lost to Argentina in the semi-finals and to Italy in the match for the bronze medal. Pepe's last appearance for Portugal was in Porto on 23 February 1930, a 2–0 win over France.

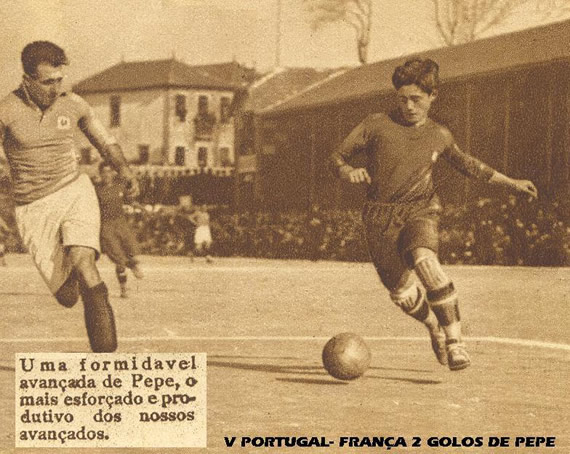
Pépe Soares – international debut for Portugal against France, Lisbon, 16 March 1927

== Death ==
On 23 October 1931, Pepe collapsed at work – he worked as a lathe operator, in a time when playing football in Portugal was often not a sole source of income. He was taken to the Naval Hospital in Lisbon with severe abdominal pain, and died the next day. He was just 23 years old.

There is still no consensus as to the specific circumstances behind Pepe's death, which was due to food poisoning. The best-known story tells of a tragic mistake made by his mother while preparing a meal on 22 October, two days before his death. Pépe's mother, who could not read, mistakenly exchanged caustic soda for salt when she made chorizos. The next day, Pépe took a sandwich containing the chorizo to work with him and consumed the corrosive compound. Of note, other relatives who had eaten the meal had also been hospitalized, but survived, and a cat that had consumed the chorizo died.

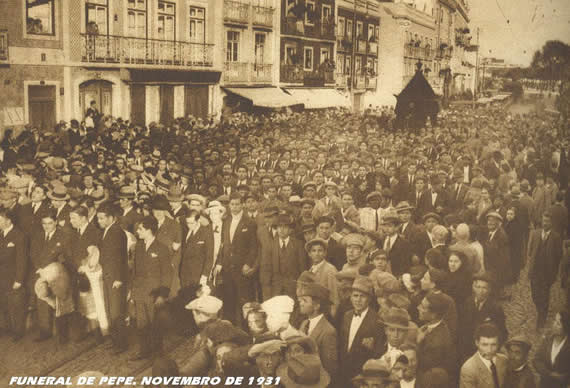
Funeral procession for Pepe in 1931

Pepe's funeral was an event of mourning on an almost-national scale. Thirty thousand people attended to pay their respects to the young star, whose loss shook the Portuguese sports world. Attendees also came from outside Portugal, including one of the greatest goalies in the history of football, Spaniard Ricardo Zamora.

== Legacy ==
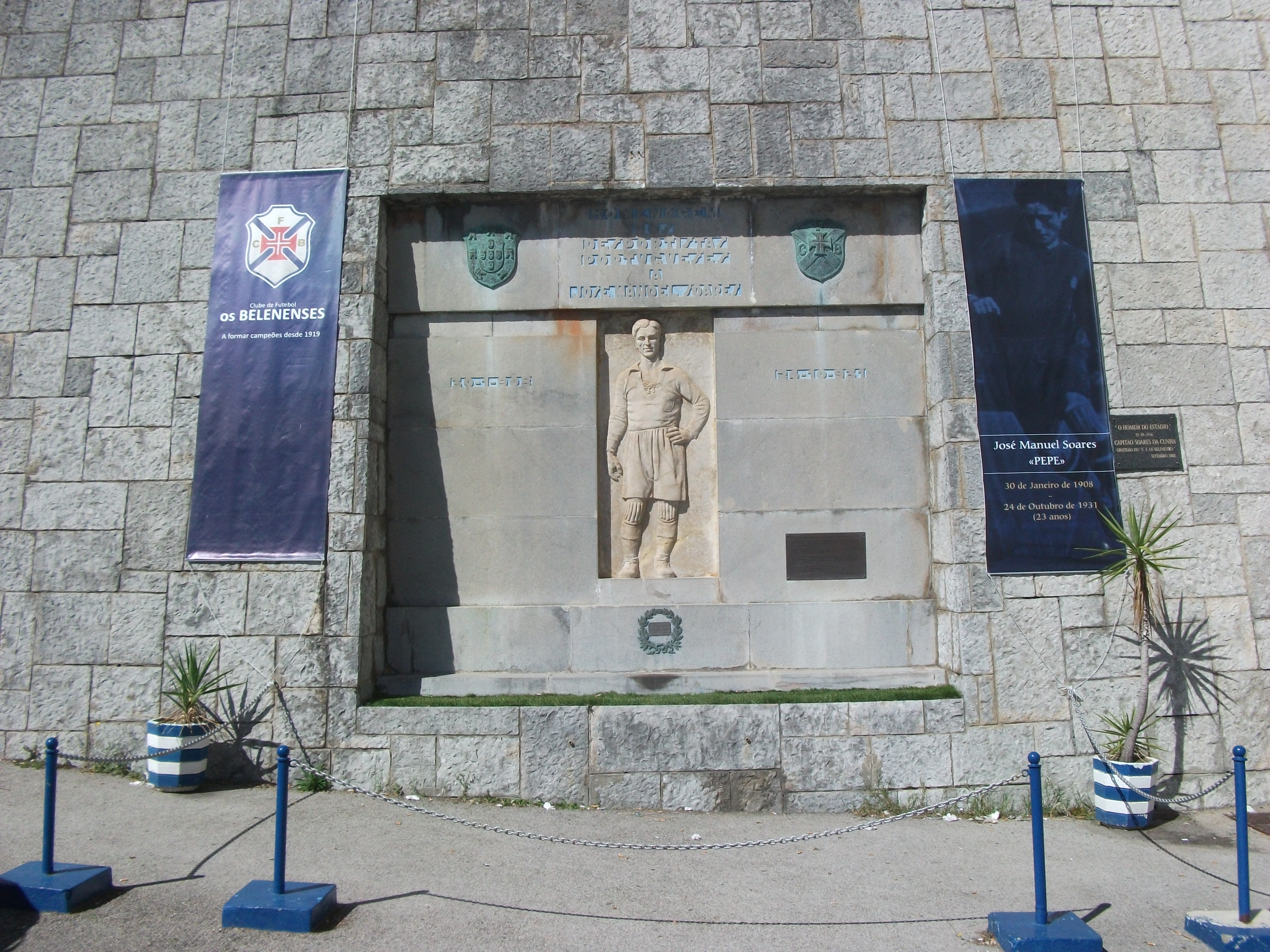
Statue of José Manoel Soares Pepe

In 1932, the year after his death, Belenenses erected a memorial to Pépe at the Salésias Stadium in Lisbon. The stadium itself was later renamed in Pepe's honor. When CF Belenenses moved to Restelo stadium in Lisbon in 1956, the memorial to Pepe was placed at the stadium entrance. It is a tradition that whenever FC Porto visits CF Belenenses for a match, the team always leaves a wreath in front of the statue before the game.

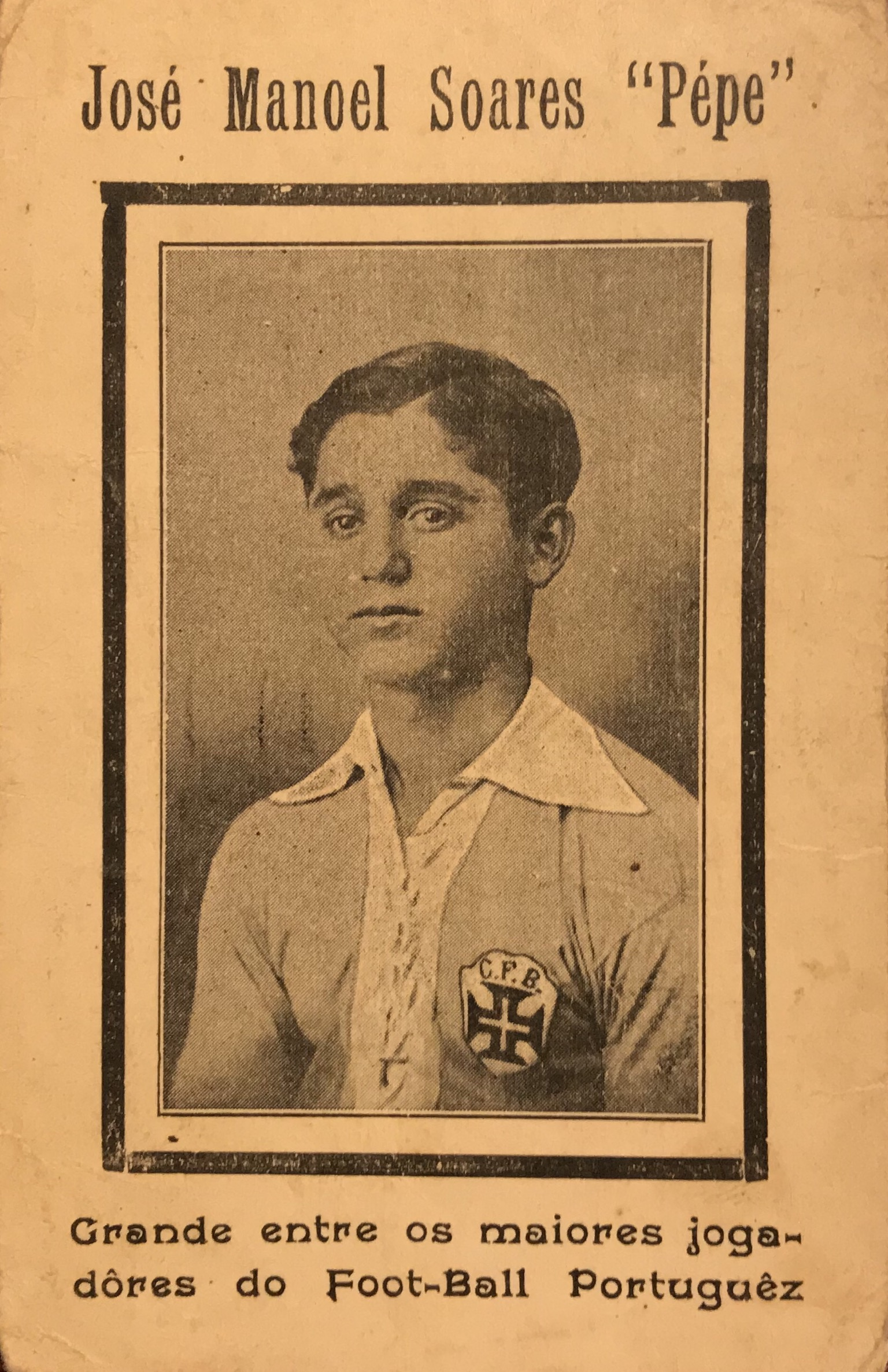
Picture postcard from Portugal of the young football star, José Manoel Soares Pepe

== International goals ==
Portugal score listed first, score column indicates score after each Pepe goal.

List of international goals scored by Pepe
No.	Date	Venue	Opponent	Score	Result	Competition
1.	16 March 1927	Estádio do Lumiar, Lisbon, Portugal	France	1–0	4–0	Friendly
2.	16 March 1927	Estádio do Lumiar, Lisbon, Portugal	France	2–0	4–0	Friendly
3.	27 May 1928	Olympic Stadium, Amsterdam, Netherlands	Chile	2–2	4–2	Football at the 1928 Summer Olympics Preliminary round
4	27 May 1928	Olympic Stadium, Amsterdam, Netherlands	Chile	3–2	4–2	Football at the 1928 Summer Olympics Preliminary round
5.	12 January 1930	Estádio do Lumiar, Lisbon, Portugal	Czechoslovakia	1–0	1–0	Friendly
6.	23 February 1930	Campo do Ameal, Porto, Portugal	France	1–0	2–0	Friendly
7	23 February 1930	Campo do Ameal, Porto, Portugal	France	2–0	2–0	Friendly
