= Augusto Silva (footballer, born 1902) =

Portuguese footballer and manager

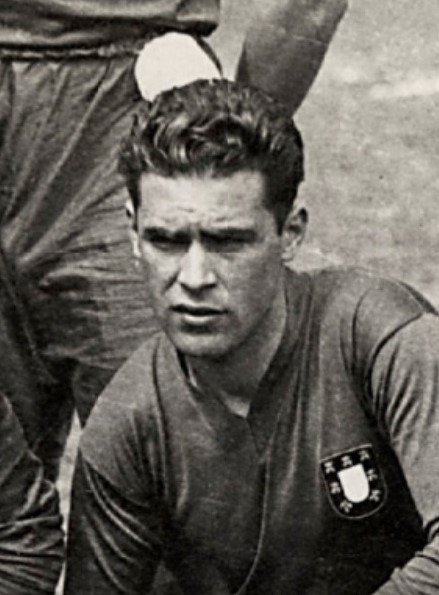
- Augusto Silva in 1928

Personal information
- Date of birth: 22 March 1902
- Place of birth: Lisbon, Portugal
- Date of death: 8 January 1962 (aged 59)
- Place of death: Portugal
- Position: Midfielder

Senior career*
Years	Team	Apps	(Gls)
1921–1934	Belenenses	41	(6)

International career
1925–1934	Portugal	21	(2)

Managerial career
- 1938–1939: Belenenses
- 1941–1942: Belenenses
- 1942–1945: Estoril
- 1945–1947: Belenenses
- 1949–1950: Porto
- 1950–1952: Belenenses
- * Club domestic league appearances and goals

Augusto Silva (22 March 1902 – 8 January 1962) was a Portuguese football midfielder and manager.

== Club career ==
Born in Lisbon, Silva spent his entire career with local C.F. Os Belenenses, playing with them as the Primeira Liga was named Championship of Portugal. He retired in 1934, at the age of 32.

Silva then became a manager, having several spells with his only club. In the 1945–46 season, he was in charge as it won the first and only national championship in its history.

== International career ==
Silva won 21 caps for Portugal, which was a national record for 16 years. He was part of the squad at the 1928 Summer Olympics, scoring once for the eventual quarter-finalists.

== See also ==
- List of one-club men
