= Armando Martins =

Portuguese footballer

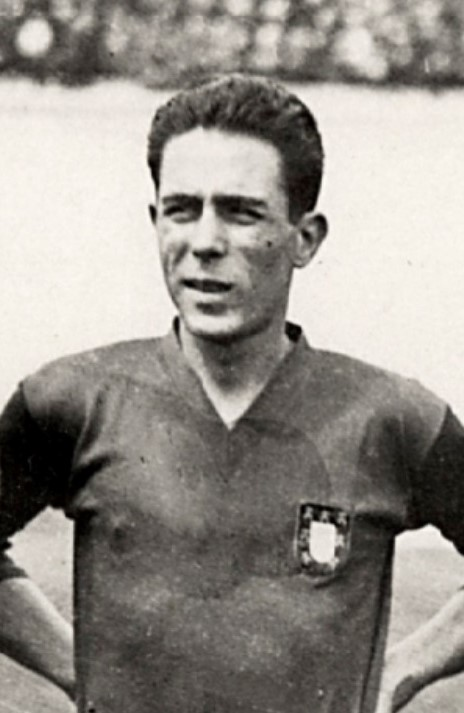
- Armando Martins in 1928

Personal information
- Full name: Armando da Silva Martins
- Date of birth: 4 March 1905
- Place of birth: Portugal
- Date of death: 28 April 1961 (aged 56)
- Position: Forward

Senior career*
Years	Team	Apps	(Gls)
1925–1935	Vitória Setúbal		

International career
1926–1931	Portugal	11	(3)
- * Club domestic league appearances and goals

Armando da Silva Martins (4 March 1905 – 28 April 1961) was a Portuguese footballer. He played as forward.

== International career ==
Martins made his international debut on 24 January 1926 in Porto against Czechoslovakia. The match ended in a 1–1 draw. He gained 11 caps and scored 3 goals for the Portugal national team. Martins was also a member of the Portugal national squad in the 1928 football Olympic tournament, where he played 2 games.
