= João Santos (footballer) =

Portuguese footballer

Personal information
- Full name: João dos Santos
- Date of birth: 11 February 1903
- Place of birth: Portugal
- Date of death: Unknown
- Position: Forward

Senior career*
Years	Team	Apps	(Gls)
- Vitória Setúbal

International career
1926–1931	Portugal	11	(4)
- * Club domestic league appearances and goals

João dos Santos (born 11 February 1903, date of death unknown) was a Portuguese footballer who played for Vitória Setúbal and the Portugal national team, as forward.

== International career ==
Santos made his debut for the national team 24 January 1926 against Czechoslovakia in a 1–1 draw in Porto, just 16 years old and scored Portugals one goal. He was a member of Portugals Squad in the 1928 Football Olympic Tournament, and played one game against Yugoslavia (2-1 win). Santos gained 11 caps and scored 4 goals.

=== International goals ===
No.	Date	Venue	Opponent	Score	Result	Competition
1.	24 January 1926	Campo do Ameal, Porto, Portugal	Czechoslovakia	1–0	1–1	Friendly
2.	18 April 1926	Stade des Ponts Jumeaux, Toulouse, France	France	4–2	4–2	Friendly
3.	26 December 1926	Campo do Ameal, Porto, Portugal	Hungary	1–2	3–3	Friendly
4.	8 January 1928	Estádio do Lumiar, Lisbon, Portugal	Spain	2–2	2–2	Friendly
