= Octávio Cambalacho =

Portuguese footballer

Personal information
- Date of birth: Unknown
- Place of birth: Portugal
- Date of death: Deceased
- Position: Forward

Senior career*
Years	Team	Apps	(Gls)
- Vitória Setúbal

International career
1927	Portugal	1	(1)
- * Club domestic league appearances and goals

Octávio Cambalacho, was a Portuguese football player who played as a forward.
