= Portugal national football team =

Men's association football team

Portugal
- Nickname(s): Seleção das Quinas (Team of the Quincunxes); Lusos (Lusitanians)
- Association: Federação Portuguesa de Futebol (FPF)
- Confederation: UEFA (Europe)
- Head coach: Jorge Jesus
- Captain: Bernardo Silva
- Most caps: Cristiano Ronaldo (234)
- Top scorer: Cristiano Ronaldo (146)
- Home stadium: Various
- FIFA code: POR
First colours	Second colours

FIFA ranking
- Current: 6 ▼1 (18 November 2026)
- Highest: 3 (May–June 2010, October 2012, April–June 2014, September 2017 – April 2018)
- Lowest: 43 (August 1998)

First international
- Spain 3–1 Portugal (Madrid, Spain; 18 December 1921)

Biggest win
- Portugal 9–0 Luxembourg (Almancil, Portugal; 11 September 2023)

Biggest defeat
- Portugal 0–10 England (Lisbon, Portugal; 25 May 1947)

World Cup
- Appearances: 9 (first in 1966)
- Best result: Third place (1966)

European Championship
- Appearances: 9 (first in 1984)
- Best result: Champions (2016)

Nations League Finals
- Appearances: 2 (first in 2019)
- Best result: Champions (2019, 2025)

Confederations Cup
- Appearances: 1 (first in 2017)
- Best result: Third place (2017)
Medal record
Men's football
FIFA World Cup
Bronze medal – third place	1966 England	Team
FIFA Confederations Cup
Bronze medal – third place	2017 Russia	Team
UEFA European Championship
Gold medal – first place	2016 France	Team
Silver medal – second place	2004 Portugal	Team
UEFA Nations League
Gold medal – first place	2019 Portugal	Team
Gold medal – first place	2025 Germany	Team
- Website: fpf.pt

The Portugal national football team (Portuguese: Seleção Portuguesa de Futebol) has represented Portugal in men's international football competition since 1921. The national team is controlled by the Portuguese Football Federation (FPF), the governing body for football in Portugal. Portugal's home stadium is the Estádio Nacional in Oeiras, located next to its primary training ground and the FPF headquarters (Cidade do Futebol), but the team usually plays its home matches in more modern stadiums throughout the country, such as the Estádio da Luz, Estádio José Alvalade and the Estádio do Dragão. The head coach is Jorge Jesus, and the captain is Bernardo Silva.

Portugal's first participation in a major tournament finals was at the 1966 FIFA World Cup, which saw a team featuring Ballon d'Or winner Eusébio finish in third place. Since the 2000s, Portugal started an uninterrupted streak of qualification for every European Championship and World Cup finals, including a runners-up finish at Euro 2004 on home soil. They experienced much of their success during the captaincy of Ballon d'Or winner Cristiano Ronaldo, where they won their first-ever major trophy Euro 2016 and the UEFA Nations League in 2019 and 2025.

Portugal is colloquially referred to as the Seleção das Quinas (a synecdoche based on the flag of the country) and has several notable rivalries with other national teams. These include Spain, due to their historical rivalry as Iberian neighbours; as well as France due to several high-stake meetings against them at the Euro and World Cup.

== History ==
=== Early World Cup attempts ===
Portugal were not invited to the 1930 World Cup, which only featured a finals stage and no qualification round. The team took part in the 1934 FIFA World Cup qualification, but failed to eliminate their Spanish opponents, aggregating two defeats in the two-legged round, with a 9–0 loss in Madrid and 2–1 loss in Lisbon for an aggregate score of 11–1.

In the 1938 FIFA World Cup qualification, the Seleção played one game against Switzerland held in neutral ground in Milan. They lost 2–1 and failed to qualify for the finals. The Second World War delayed the World Cup until 1950 and subsequently, the national team rarely played. A 10–0 home friendly loss against England, two years after the war, still stands as their biggest ever defeat.

=== 1950s and early 1960s ===
Similar to 1934, Portugal were to play a two-legged round against Spain. After a 5–1 defeat in Madrid, they managed to draw the second game 2–2. With a 7–3 aggregate score, they did not qualify on the pitch, however they would later be invited to replace Turkey, which had withdrawn from participating. Portugal refused to participate.

In 1954 FIFA World Cup qualification, the team would play Austria; the Austrians won the first game with a 9–1 result. The best the Portuguese could do was hold the Austrians to a goalless draw in Lisbon, resulting in a 9–1 aggregate defeat. Four years later, Portugal won a qualifying match for the first time, a 3–0 home victory over Italy. Nevertheless, they finished last in a group that also featured Northern Ireland; only the first-placed team, Northern Ireland, would qualify.

1960 was the year that UEFA created the European Championship. The first edition was a knock-out tournament with the last four teams participating in the finals stage that only featured one leg while the earlier stages had two legs. In the first round, the Seleção das Quinas won 2–0 at East Germany and then 3–2 in Porto, advancing with a 5–2 two-legged win. Portugal faced Yugoslavia in the quarter-finals, losing 6–3 on aggregate.

Portugal faced England and Luxembourg in 1962 FIFA World Cup qualification and ended up second in the group, behind England, who would be the only team in Group 6 to qualify. In the 1964 European Championship, Portugal played against Bulgaria in the qualifying rounds. The Portuguese lost in Sofia and won in Lisbon. With the round tied 4–4, a replay was needed in a neutral country. In the Stadio Olimpico in Rome, Portugal lost 1–0 thanks to a late strike from Georgi Asparuhov.

=== Third place at the 1966 World Cup ===
Portugal were drawn with Czechoslovakia, Romania and Turkey for 1966 World Cup qualification. They topped the group with only one draw and one defeat in six games and finally qualified for a FIFA World Cup, with a 1–0 away win against Czechoslovakia and Turkey and a 5–1 home win against the Turks being notable results.

At the World Cup, the team started out with three wins in the group stage after they beat Hungary 3–1, Bulgaria 3–0, and two-time defending champions Brazil 3–1. Secondly, they beat quarter-finalists North Korea 5–3, with Eusébio getting four markers to overturn a 3–0 deficit. Later, they reached the semi-finals where they were beaten by hosts England 2–1; in this game, Portugal would have played in Liverpool, but as England were the hosts, FIFA decided that the game would be played in London. Portugal then defeated the Soviet Union 2–1 in the third place match for their best World Cup finish to date. Eusébio was the top scorer of the World Cup with nine goals. Portugal would not qualify for another World Cup for 20 years.

=== 1980s ===
Portugal won their Euro 1984 qualifying group that contained Finland, Poland and the Soviet Union with a win over the latter, allowing them to qualify and be placed in Group B alongside Spain, West Germany and Romania in the finals. In the first two matches, they drew 0–0 and 1–1 against West Germany and Spain, respectively. A 1–0 win over Romania resulted in a second-place finish in group play. Portugal were paired against hosts France in the semi-finals. After a draw in regular time, Portugal initially led 2–1 in extra time, but the hosts scored in the 114th and 119th minutes to eliminate the Portuguese 3–2 and go through to the final.

For 1986 World Cup qualification, the Seleção played against Czechoslovakia, Malta, Sweden and West Germany for the two spots that would guarantee them a ticket to Mexico. Needing a win in the last game against West Germany in Stuttgart, Portugal won the game to become the first team to beat West Germany at their home ground in an official match. The team exited early in the group stages after a win and two losses. They started with a 1–0 win against England, but later were beaten by Poland and Morocco 1–0 and 3–1 respectively. Their staying in Mexico was marked by the Saltillo Affair, where players refused to train in order to win more prizes from the Portuguese Football Federation. Mexico marked their last World Cup appearance until 2002.

=== 1995–2006: The golden generation ===
At UEFA Euro 1996, Portugal finished first in Group D, and in the quarter-finals, they lost 1–0 to the Czech Republic.

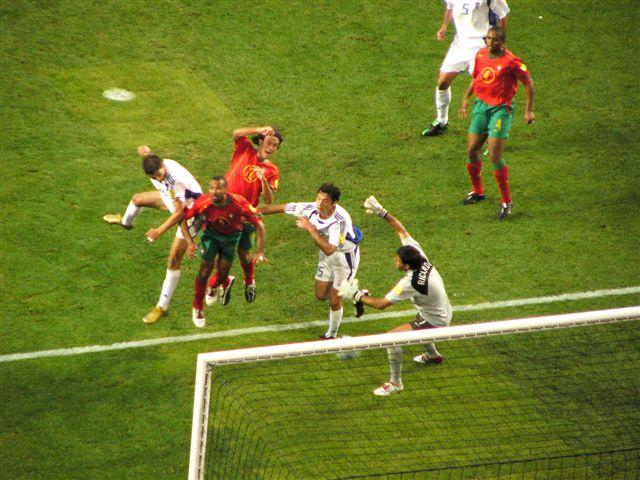
Portugal lost the Euro 2004 final 0–1 to Greece with a header from Angelos Charisteas (pictured)

Portugal failed to qualify for the 1998 FIFA World Cup. In Euro 2000 qualifying, Portugal finished second in their group, one point short of first-placed Romania. However, after finishing as the top runner-up nation in qualifying, Portugal nonetheless secured a spot in the finals. They then defeated England 3–2, Romania 1–0 and Germany 3–0 to finish first in Group A, then defeated Turkey in the quarter-finals. In the semi-finals against France, Portugal were eliminated in extra time when Zinedine Zidane converted a penalty. Referee Günter Benkö awarded the spot kick for a handball after Abel Xavier blocked a shot. Xavier, Nuno Gomes and Paulo Bento were all given lengthy suspensions for subsequently shoving the referee. The final eventually finished 2–1.

During 2002 FIFA World Cup qualifying, Portugal won the group. Several problems and poor judgement decisions occurred during the preparation and tournament itself and were widely reported in the Portuguese press, including questionable managing choices and some amateurism, as well as lack of agreement on prizes. Portugal entered the tournament as favourites to win Group D. However, they were upset 3–2 by the United States. They then rebounded with a 4–0 victory over Poland. Needing a draw to advance, they lost the last group game to hosts South Korea. Portugal underachieved and ended third in its group stage, subsequently eliminated. Manager António Oliveira was fired after the World Cup.

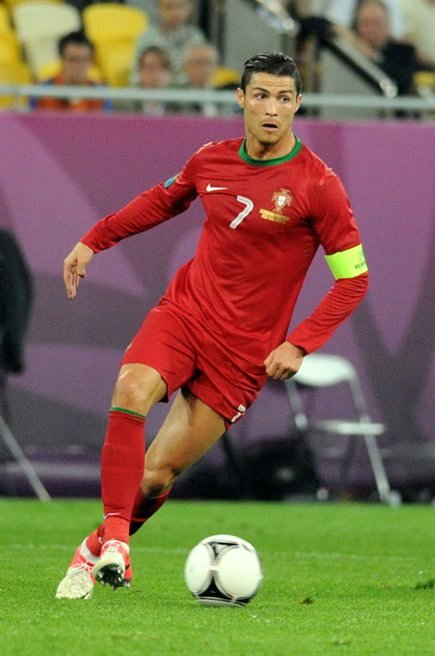
Ronaldo, pictured playing against Germany at Euro 2012, assumed the captaincy in the wake of Euro 2008

The next major competition, the UEFA Euro 2004, was held in Portugal. For preparation, the Football Federation made a contract with Luiz Felipe Scolari to manage the team until the tournament ended. The host nation lost the first game against Greece 1–2. They achieved their first win against Russia 2–0 and also beat Spain 1–0. They went on to play against England, in a 2–2 draw that went into penalties, with Portugal winning. Portugal beat the Netherlands 2–1 in the semi-finals, and suffered a second defeat from Greece, 1–0, in the final.

After the tournament ended, many players belonging to the Geração de Ouro (Golden Generation), abandoned their international footballing careers, with only Luís Figo remaining in the team, despite a temporary retirement. The silver lining for Portugal was the emergence of Cristiano Ronaldo, who was selected in the UEFA Euro All-Star team. While Portugal were playing in the competition, Scolari agreed in a new two-year deal with the Federation.

Portugal finished first in the qualifying round for the 2006 World Cup, and topped Group D in the World Cup, with victories over Angola (1–0), Iran (2–0) and Mexico (2–1). Portugal defeated the Netherlands 1–0 in the Round of 16 in an infamous matched that has come to be known as the Battle of Nuremberg, marked by violent fouls and many players cautioned or sent off by referee Valentin Ivanov. Portugal drew 0–0 after extra time with England in the quarter-final, but won 3–1 on penalties to reach their first World Cup semi-final since 1966. Portugal lost the semi-final 1–0 against France, and were then defeated 3–1 by the tournament hosts, Germany, in the third-place play-off match.

=== 2008–2026: Cristiano Ronaldo captaincy and first major titles ===
For Euro 2008 Portugal finished second in qualification behind Poland, and won their first two group games against Turkey and the Czech Republic, although a loss to co-hosts Switzerland set up a quarter-final matchup with Germany which the team lost 3–2. After the tournament, Scolari left to take over at Chelsea. Afterwards, Carlos Queiroz was appointed as the head coach of the Portugal national team.

Portugal came second in the qualifying stages for the 2010 FIFA World Cup under Queiroz, then beat Bosnia and Herzegovina in a play-off, thereby reaching every tournament in the decade. A 19-match undefeated streak, in which the team conceded only three goals, ended with a loss to eventual champions Spain in the round of 16, 1–0. Queiroz was later criticised for setting up his team in an overly cautious way. After the World Cup, squad regulars Simão Sabrosa, Paulo Ferreira, Miguel Monteiro and Tiago Mendes all retired from international football. Queiroz was banned from coaching the national team for one month after he tried to block a doping test to the team while preparing for the World Cup, as well as directing insulting words to the testers. In consequence, he received a further six-month suspension. Several media outbursts from Queiroz against the heads of the Portuguese Football Federation followed, which partly prompted his dismissal. Paulo Bento was appointed as his replacement at head coach.

Bento's team qualified for Euro 2012; they were drawn with Germany, Denmark, and the Netherlands in a widely speculated "group of death". They lost their first game 0–1 to Germany, then beat Denmark 3–2. The final group stage match was against the Netherlands. After Van der Vaart had given the Dutch a 1–0 lead, Ronaldo netted twice to ensure a 2–1 victory. Portugal finished second in the group and qualified for the knockout phase. Portugal defeated the Czech Republic 1–0 in the quarter-finals with a header from Ronaldo. The semi-final match was against Spain, who defeated Portugal 4–2 on penalties after a goalless draw.

In 2014 FIFA World Cup qualifying, Portugal won 4–2 on aggregate in a play-off against Sweden with all four goals being scored by Ronaldo, and were drawn into Group G with the United States, Germany and Ghana. Their first match against the Germans was their worst-ever defeat in a World Cup, a 4–0 loss. They went on to draw 2–2 against the United States and won 2–1 against Ghana. However, the team were eliminated due to inferior goal difference to the Americans.

Portugal's starting lineup for the UEFA Euro 2016 final

In UEFA Euro 2016 qualifying, Bento was dismissed following a defeat to Albania and was replaced by Fernando Santos in September 2014. After qualifying for the finals, Portugal finished third in Group F but advanced to the knockout stages as the third-best third place team following three straight draws. Portugal beat Croatia 1–0 after extra time in the round of 16 and then defeated Poland 5–3 on penalties to reach the semi-finals, where they defeated Wales 2–0. In the final against the hosts, France, Ronaldo went off injured. In extra time, substitute Eder scored the winning goal for Portugal in the 109th minute with a strike from 25 yards past Hugo Lloris.

Following their Euro 2016 victory, Portugal participated in the 2017 FIFA Confederations Cup. They finished top of their group, but lost to Chile on penalties after a goalless draw in the semi-finals, but rebounded in the third place game, defeating Mexico 2–1 after extra time.

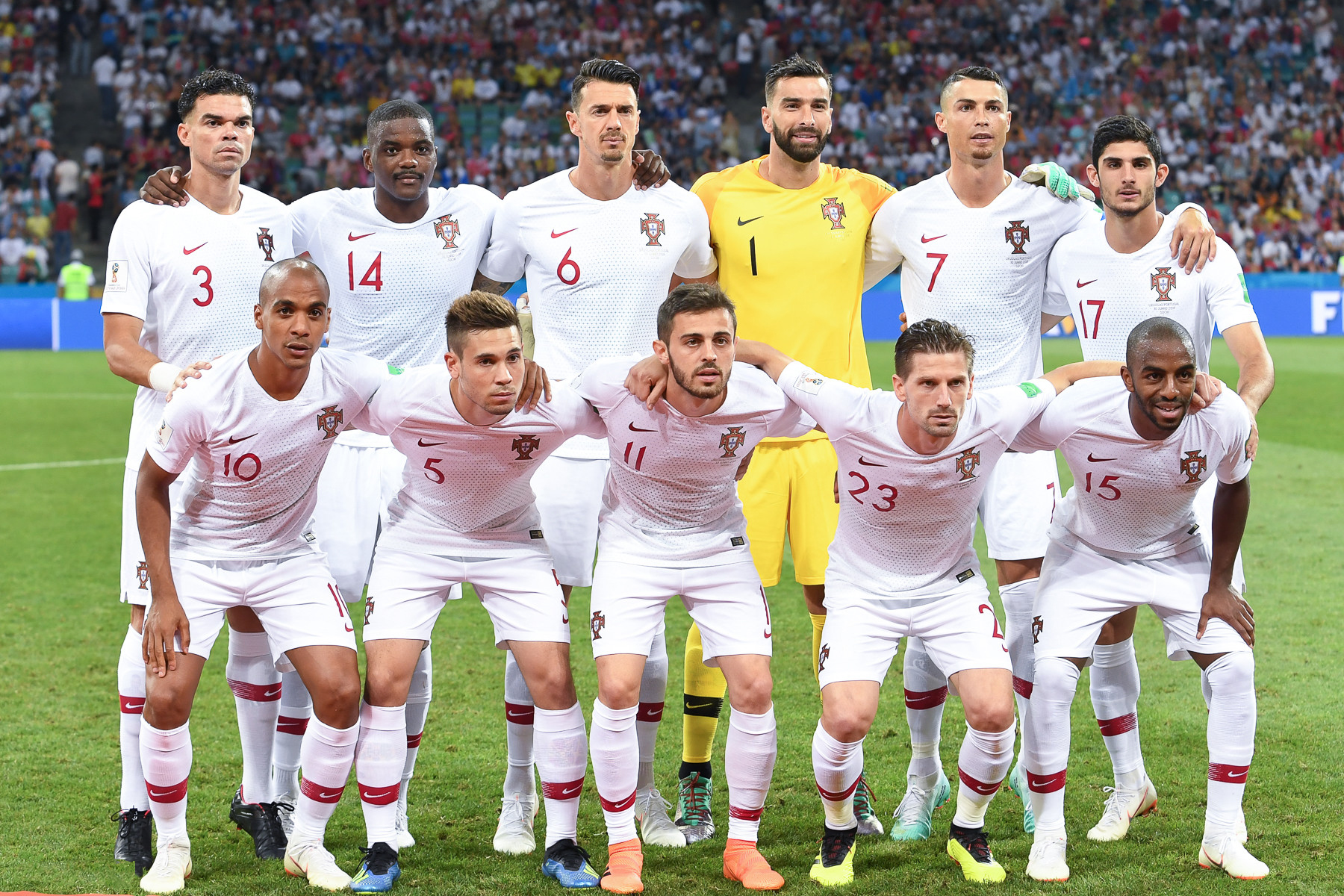
Portugal lining up before a match at the 2018 FIFA World Cup

At the 2018 FIFA World Cup, Portugal opened their campaign with a 3–3 draw with Spain, with Cristiano Ronaldo scoring a hat-trick. After a 1–0 victory against Morocco, Portugal drew 1–1 with Iran to progress to the knockout round as group runners-up. Portugal were eliminated following a 2–1 defeat to Uruguay in the round of 16.

Following the World Cup, Portugal won the inaugural UEFA Nations League beating the Netherlands at the Estádio do Dragão in Porto, with the only goal scored by Gonçalo Guedes in the 60th minute.

At UEFA Euro 2020, Portugal were drawn into a group containing France, Germany and Hungary which was widely speculated as being the "group of death". Portugal advanced to the next round by defeating Hungary, drawing with France and losing to Germany. There, they faced Belgium but lost 1–0.

For the 2022 FIFA World Cup qualifiers, Portugal were required to qualify for the finals via the play-offs after finishing second in their group. Nevertheless, Portugal managed to beat Turkey and North Macedonia to qualify for the final tournament. At the 2022 World Cup, Portugal defeated Ghana 3–2 in their first group game and then beat Uruguay 2–0. to qualify for the knockout stages. The Portuguese would demolish Switzerland 6–1 in the next round, their highest tally in a World Cup knockout game since the 1966 World Cup, with Gonçalo Ramos scoring a hat-trick. However, they were eliminated by tournament in the quarter-finals by Morocco, 1–0. Following a disappointing World Cup campaign, Fernando Santos was dismissed on 15 December.

On 9 January 2023, Roberto Martinez was announced as the new head coach of Portugal. On 11 September, Martinez led Portugal to their biggest victory in international history by defeating Luxembourg 9–0 at home. Martinez's Portuguese side were one of the first European sides to advance from qualifying into the UEFA Euro 2024 after their 3–2 win over Slovakia, making it their quickest qualification to a major tournament in their history. Following a 2–0 home over Iceland, Martinez led Portugal to a perfect qualification campaign, overtaking the record for most scored and least scored against in a qualifying campaign in the country's history, with a record of 36 goals scored and only two goals conceded, keeping nine clean sheets in the process. Portugal also became one of the few European national teams to win all of their matches for the qualifiers of the UEFA European Championship, with ten wins from ten matches, the first time in Portugal's international history.

In their European Championship group, Portugal were paired with Georgia, Turkey and Czechia. With wins against Czechia and Turkey and a loss to Georgia, Portugal qualified for the Round of 16 as group winners, where they played against Slovenia. The game finished 0–0 and was decided on penalties, with Portuguese goalkeeper Diogo Costa saving each of Slovenia's penalties, while Portugal scored all of theirs. Facing France in the quarter-finals, the game again finished 0–0 and was decided on penalties; a miss by João Felix meant France won 5–3, and Portugal were eliminated.

On 9 June 2025, Roberto Martinez guided Portugal to their second UEFA Nations League title after defeating the reigning European champions Spain 5–3 on penalties.

In the 2026 World Cup, Portugal were drawn into Group K with Colombia, DR Congo, and Uzbekistan. On June 17, they tied their opener against DR Congo 1–1. After a disappointing group stage where they finished second place in their group, Martinez let Portugal to an underwhelming round of 16 finish, after a 1–0 defeat to Spain. Following the match, he announced his resignation with immediate effect. The team was heavily criticised for their performance following their elimination.

=== 2026–present: Post Ronaldo era ===
On 10 July, Jorge Jesus was appointed as head coach of the Portugal national team. With four wins in four matches, he secured qualification for the Nations League quarter-finals, becoming the first team to qualify and the only one to date to win all four of its opening matches in League A of the competition. During this period, Jesus clashed with Cristiano Ronaldo after leaving him on the bench during Portugal's 2–1 win over Norway, prompting Ronaldo to leave the squad before facing Denmark. On 6 October, Ronaldo accused Jesus of breaking promises over his playing time but apologised for leaving, while both expressed openness to his return. Ronaldo later announced his retirement from national team on 5 November.

== Team image ==
=== Kits ===
Portugal played its first international match, against Spain in 1921, in black shirts and white shorts. In the late 1920s the team adopted the deep red of the national flag, introduced by the First Republic in 1910, initially worn with blue shorts.

Since then, Portugal's traditional home kit has been red with green trim, the two colours of the flag. The shade of red has varied between kits, from a darker burgundy or maroon to a brighter scarlet, the "bright red" (vermelho vivo) specified for the flag. The shirt has been worn with either red or green shorts: the Euro 2016 kit had shorts in the same red as the shirt, while the Euro 2020 and 2022 World Cup kits had green shorts.

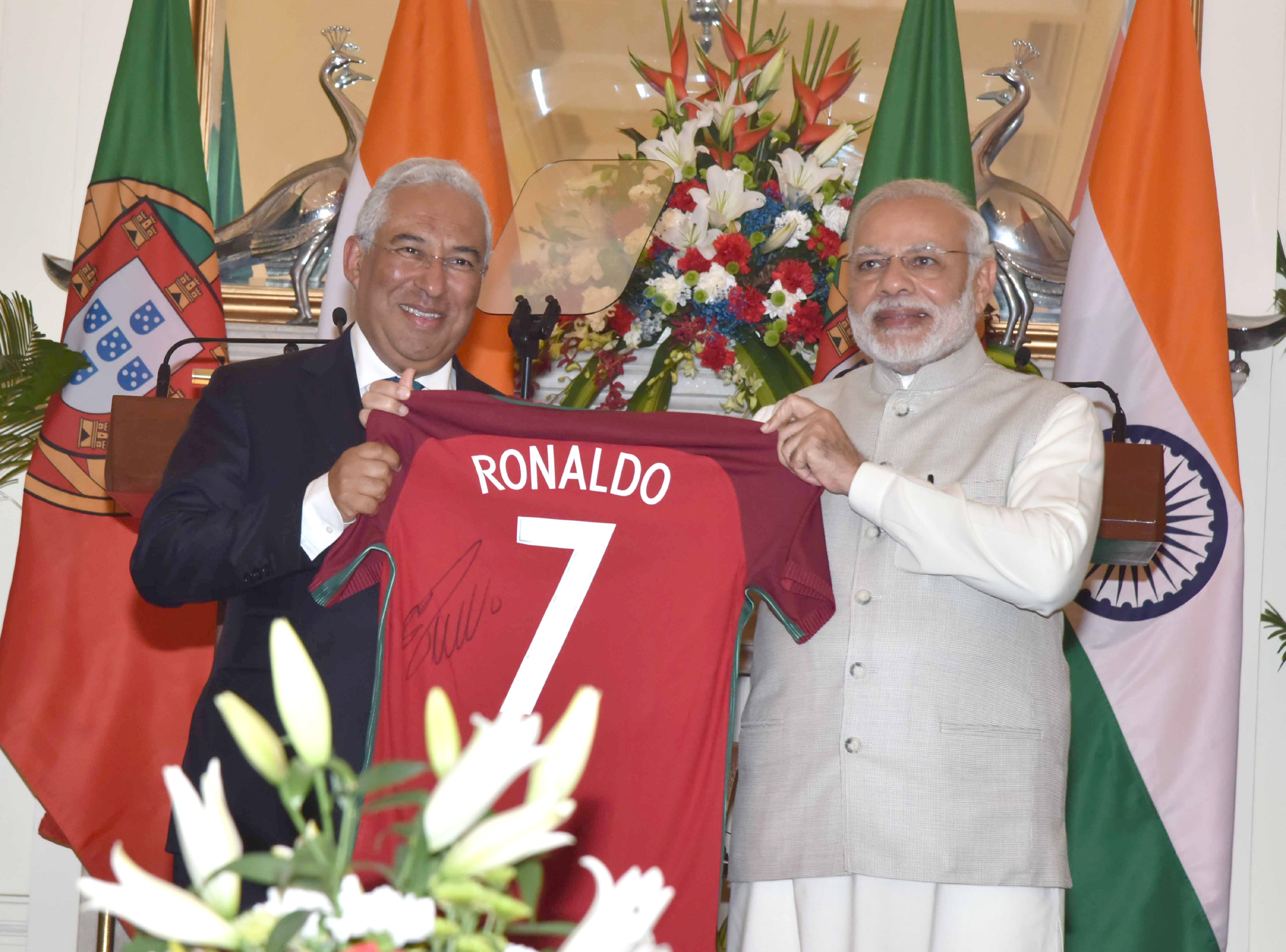
Portuguese Prime Minister António Costa presents Indian Prime Minister Narendra Modi a signed Portugal Cristiano Ronaldo shirt in January 2017.

The away kit has varied far more. It has most often been predominantly white, usually with red and green details taken from the home colours, and sometimes with blue: the 2022 World Cup away kit was off-white with a red and green stripe across the chest and blue sleeves and collar. Other colours have also been used. An all-black away kit was introduced in 2013, and black returned for the 2015–16 kit, with a red and green chest band. For Euro 2016, which Portugal went on to win, the away kit was turquoise-teal with navy socks.

Portugal's kits were produced in-house until the 1950s, and later by the manufacturers Marlec and Carné. Adidas supplied the team from 1978 to 1994, followed by Olympic until 1997. Nike then supplied Portugal for 27 years, from 1997 to 2024, a period that included the Euro 2016 title. In November 2024, the Portuguese Football Federation announced a long-term agreement with Puma, effective from 1 January 2025. Puma's first home kit, released in January 2025, was red with off-white trim and, in a break with tradition, no green, while the away kit was off-white with red and green details. For the 2026 FIFA World Cup, both kits were inspired by the sea and Portugal's maritime history. The home kit returned to red with green accents on the collar and cuffs, with a subtle wave pattern across the shirt, and was worn with red shorts and green socks.

=== Kit suppliers ===
Period	Supplier
1920–1976	None
1976–1994	(Germany) Adidas
1994–1996	(Belgium) Olympic Sportswear
1997–2024	(United States) Nike
2025–	(Germany) Puma

=== Home stadium ===
Portugal's national stadium is the Estádio Nacional in Oeiras, near Lisbon, which opened on 10 June 1944 and was built to serve as the official home of the national team. The team no longer plays there regularly: hosting duties are now shared between more modern stadiums, and the Estádio Nacional is used mainly for the annual Taça de Portugal final.

Most matches are now played at the three largest stadiums in the country, the homes of the "Big Three" clubs: the Estádio da Luz (Benfica) and the Estádio José Alvalade (Sporting) in Lisbon, and the Estádio do Dragão (Porto) in Porto. The Estádio da Luz, including the original ground opened in 1954 and its replacement opened in 2003, is the venue where the team has won most often. The Estádio do Dragão was the venue for Portugal's victory in the 2019 Nations League Finals. All three stadiums will host matches at the 2030 FIFA World Cup. Other friendly matches, as well as qualifying fixtures against smaller opponents, are played in regional stadiums, such as the Estádio Algarve in Faro/Loulé, which hosted a UEFA Euro 2024 qualifying match against Luxembourg.

=== Media coverage ===
Portugal's UEFA Nations League matches are televised nationwide by RTP1, the flagship free-to-air channel of the public broadcaster RTP, and streamed on its online platform RTP Play. The pay-television broadcaster Sport TV holds the rights to the competition as a whole and shows the matches not carried by RTP. On radio, the team's matches are broadcast by RTP's Antena 1.

For the 2026 FIFA World Cup, Sport TV broadcast all 104 matches, while RTP and the private channels SIC and TVI jointly acquired the free-to-air rights to 20 matches, including every Portugal game, and shared them between the three channels. Portugal's matches were also streamed free of charge on YouTube by LiveModeTV. The radio rights were held by Rádio Renascença and TSF.

== Rivalries ==
Portugal has rivalries with four countries: its Iberian neighbour Spain, France, England, and Brazil, with which it shares close historical and linguistic ties.

- Their rivalry with Spain, also known as the "Iberian derby", has been contested since 1921. Portugal played their first ever international game against Spain, losing 3–1 on 18 December 1921 in Madrid. Portugal earned their first draw in 1926 and their first win (4–1) in 1947. In this friendly rivalry, Portugal trails in the head-to-head record with 6 wins, 18 draws, and 18 losses, after 42 games. In competitive matches, Portugal has 1 win, 6 draws, and 6 losses. Their only competitive win came as hosts in the group stage of Euro 2004, when Portugal won 1–0 and eliminated Spain from the tournament. Portugal was knocked out by Spain in the round of 16 of the 2010 FIFA World Cup (1–0) and on penalties in the semi-finals of Euro 2012, and drew 3–3 with them in the group stage of the 2018 FIFA World Cup, with a hat-trick from Cristiano Ronaldo. Portugal beat Spain on penalties after a 2–2 draw in the 2025 UEFA Nations League final to win their second Nations League title. In their last competitive match, Portugal was knocked out by Spain again, losing 1–0 in the 2026 FIFA World Cup round of 16. Portugal will co-host the 2030 FIFA World Cup with Spain and Morocco.
- Their rivalry with France has been contested since 1926. Portugal lost the first meeting 4–2 on 18 April 1926 in Toulouse, and won the return match 4–0 in Lisbon the following year. Although the two nations are not geographical neighbours, the rivalry is enhanced by the large Portuguese community in France and by a series of decisive tournament meetings. Portugal was knocked out by France in three major semi-finals: at Euro 1984 (3–2 after extra time), at Euro 2000 (2–1, by a golden goal penalty) and at the 2006 FIFA World Cup (1–0). Portugal's most notable victory came in the UEFA Euro 2016 final at the Stade de France, where they beat the hosts 1–0 with an extra-time goal by Eder to win their first major trophy. Portugal drew 2–2 with France in the group stage of Euro 2020, and was knocked out by them on penalties after a 0–0 draw in the Euro 2024 quarter-finals. Portugal trails in the head-to-head with 6 wins, 4 draws, and 19 losses, after 29 games.
- Their rivalry with England has been contested since 1947. Portugal lost the first meeting 10–0 on 25 May 1947 in Lisbon, which remains their record defeat, and did not beat England until 1955 (3–1). Portugal was knocked out by England in the semi-finals of the 1966 FIFA World Cup, losing 2–1 in a match controversially moved from Goodison Park to Wembley. The rivalry intensified in the 2000s: Portugal came back from 2–0 down to win 3–2 at Euro 2000, and then knocked England out on penalties in two consecutive quarter-finals, as hosts at Euro 2004 (2–2 after extra time) and at the 2006 FIFA World Cup (0–0), a match remembered for the sending-off of Wayne Rooney and the wink of his club teammate Cristiano Ronaldo. Portugal has 3 wins, 10 draws, and 10 losses, after 23 games; the two sides are level in competitive matches, with 2 wins each and 6 draws.
- Their rivalry with Brazil is rooted in the two countries' shared language and colonial history, and is generally regarded as a fraternal one. Portugal lost the first meeting 1–0 on 8 April 1956 in Lisbon, and earned their first win (1–0) in 1963. Portugal has met Brazil only twice at the World Cup, both times in the group stage. In 1966, Portugal won 3–1 to help eliminate the defending champions, in a match that remains controversial for the repeated, unpunished fouling of Pelé, who played on injured. In 2010, the teams drew 0–0. Portugal trails in the head-to-head with 4 wins, 3 draws, and 13 losses, after 20 games.

== Coaching staff ==
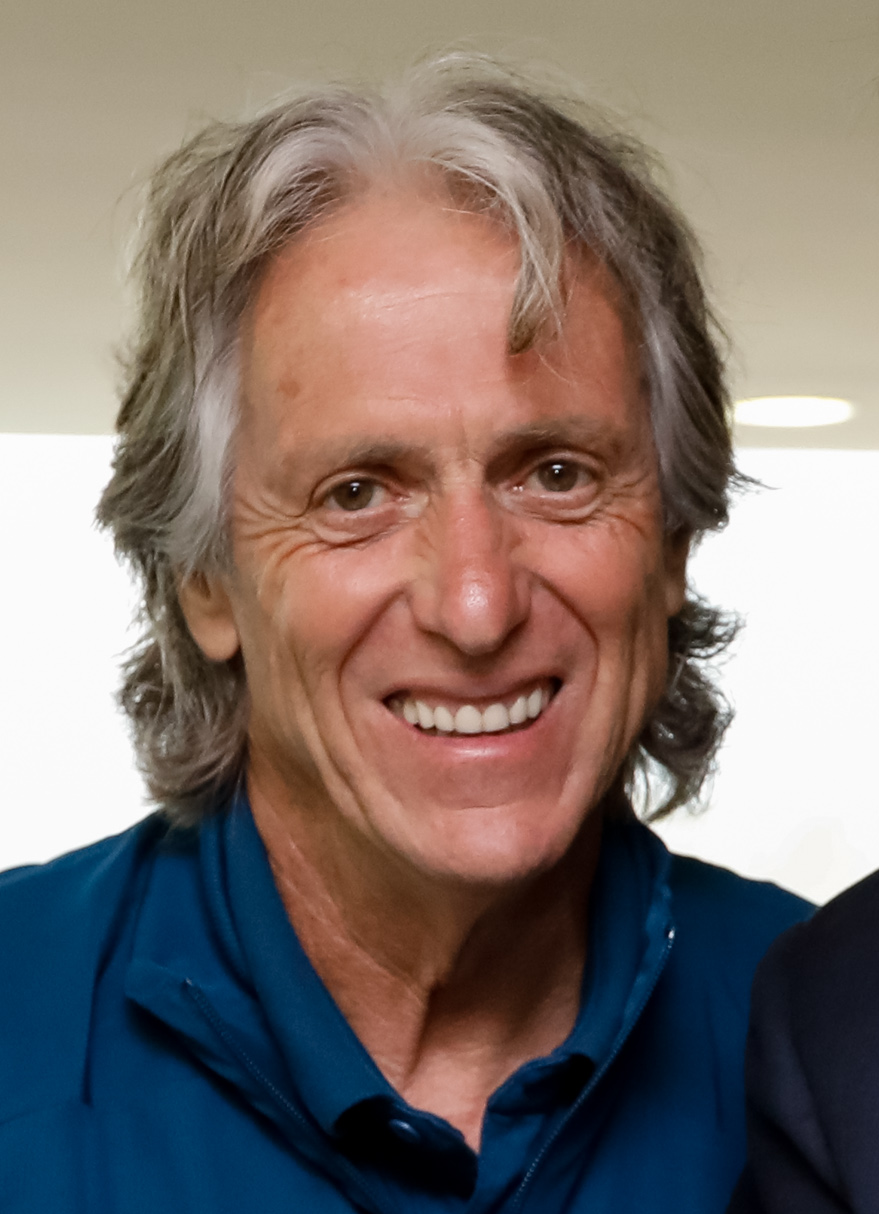
Current head coach Jorge Jesus

Position	Name
Head coach	(Portugal) Jorge Jesus
Assistant coaches	(Portugal) João de Deus (Portugal) Ricardo Carvalho
Goalkeeping coaches	(Portugal) Ricardo
Chief analyst	(Portugal) Rodrigo Araújo (Portugal) Gil Henriques (Portugal) Fábio Jesus
Performance manager	(Portugal) Márcio Sampaio
Technical director	(Portugal) José Couceiro (Portugal) José Guilherme
Sports scientist	(Portugal) João Brito
Head of media and communications	(Portugal) Marco Ferreira
Academy manager	(Portugal) Joaquim Milheiro

== Results and fixtures ==
The following is a list of match results in the last 12 months, as well as any future matches that have been scheduled.

Win Draw Loss Fixture

=== 2026 ===
28 March 2026 Friendly	Mexico	0–0	Portugal	Mexico City, Mexico
20:00 UTC−6		Report		Stadium: Estadio Azteca; Attendance: 84,130; Referee: Walter López (Guatemala)

31 March 2026 Friendly	United States	0–2	Portugal	Atlanta, United States
19:00 EDT (UTC-04:00)		Report	Trincão 37'; Félix 59'	Stadium: Mercedes-Benz Stadium; Attendance: 72,297; Referee: Sven Jablonski (Germany)

6 June 2026 Friendly	Portugal	2–1	Chile	Oeiras, Portugal
18:45 EEST (UTC+01:00)	Guedes 58'; Fernandes 75'	Report	Cepeda 90+2'	Stadium: Estádio Nacional; Attendance: 37,031; Referee: Luca Zufferli (Italy)

10 June 2026 Friendly	Portugal	2–1	Nigeria	Leiria, Portugal
20:45 EEST (UTC+01:00)	Neto 23'; Conceição 75'	Report	Adams 37'	Stadium: Estádio Dr. Magalhães Pessoa; Attendance: 21,049; Referee: Mateo Busquets Ferrer (Spain)

17 June 2026 2026 FIFA World Cup Group K	Portugal	1–1	DR Congo	Houston, United States
12:00 EST (UTC-05:00)	J. Neves 6'	Report	Wissa 45+5'	Stadium: NRG Stadium; Attendance: 68,777; Referee: Abdulrahman Al-Jassim (Qatar)

23 June 2026 2026 FIFA World Cup Group K	Portugal	5–0	Uzbekistan	Houston, United States
12:00 EST (UTC-05:00)	Ronaldo 6', 39'; Mendes 17'; Nematov 60' (o.g.); Leão 87'	Report		Stadium: NRG Stadium; Attendance: 68,777; Referee: Jalal Jayed (Morocco)

27 June 2026 2026 FIFA World Cup Group K	Colombia	0–0	Portugal	Miami Gardens, United States
17:30 EDT (UTC-04:00)		Report		Stadium: Hard Rock Stadium; Attendance: 64,478; Referee: Alireza Faghani (Australia)

2 July 2026 2026 FIFA World Cup Round of 32	Portugal	2–1	Croatia	Toronto, Canada
19:00 EDT (UTC-04:00)	Ronaldo 68' (pen.); Ramos 90+4'	Report	Perišić 53'	Stadium: BMO Field; Attendance: 43,036; Referee: Espen Eskås (Norway)

6 July 2026 2026 FIFA World Cup Round of 16	Portugal	0–1	Spain	Arlington, United States
14:00 CDT		Report	Merino 90+1'	Stadium: AT&T Stadium; Attendance: 70,649; Referee: Anthony Taylor (England)

24 September 2026 2026–27 UEFA Nations League	Portugal	1–0	Wales	Lisbon, Portugal
19:45 UTC+1	Félix 22'	Report		Stadium: Estádio José Alvalade; Attendance: 47,725; Referee: Donatas Rumšas (Lithuania)

27 September 2026 2026–27 UEFA Nations League	Norway	1–2	Portugal	Oslo, Norway
20:45 UTC+2	Haaland 51'	Report	Félix 17'; Ramos 54'	Stadium: Ullevaal Stadion; Attendance: 25,953; Referee: François Letexier (France)

1 October 2026 2026–27 UEFA Nations League	Denmark	2–4	Portugal	Copenhagen, Denmark
20:45 UTC+2	Damsgaard 23'; Højlund 53'	Report	Cancelo 13'; Ramos 25'; Vitinha 67'; Félix 87'	Stadium: Parken Stadium; Attendance: 35,951; Referee: Mykola Balakin (Ukraine)

4 October 2026 2026–27 UEFA Nations League	Portugal	2–1	Norway	Porto, Portugal
19:45 UTC+1	Cancelo 38'; Ramos 79'	Report	Ajer 36'	Stadium: Estádio do Dragão; Attendance: 48,832; Referee: Maurizio Mariani (Italy)

14 November 2026 2026–27 UEFA Nations League	Portugal	1–4	Denmark	Braga, Portugal
19:45 UTC+0	B. Silva 90+3'	Report	Højbjerg 43' (pen.); Højlund 50', 57'; Andersen 75'	Stadium: Estádio Municipal de Braga; Attendance: 24,879; Referee: Rade Obrenovič (Slovenia)

17 November 2026 2026–27 UEFA Nations League	Wales	2–3	Portugal	Cardiff, Wales
19:45 UTC+0	Brooks 13'; Thomas 40'	Report	Fernandes 11'; Neto 43'; Forbs 70'	Stadium: Cardiff City Stadium; Attendance: 32,682; Referee: Sven Jablonski (Germany)

=== 2027 ===
March 2026–27 UEFA Nations League Quarter-finals	v	Portugal	TBD
			Stadium: TBD

March 2026–27 UEFA Nations League Quarter-finals	Portugal	v	TBD
			Stadium: TBD

== Players ==
=== Current squad ===
The following players were named in the squad for the 2026–27 UEFA Nations League matches against Denmark and Wales on 14 and 17 November respectively.
Caps and goals correct as of 17 November 2026, after the match against Wales.

No.	Pos.	Player	Date of birth (age)	Caps	Goals	Club
1	GK	Diogo Costa	19 September 1999 (age 27)	54	0	(Portuguese Football Federation) Porto
12	GK	Rui Silva	7 February 1994 (age 32)	3	0	(Portuguese Football Federation) Sporting CP
22	GK	Samuel Soares	15 June 2002 (age 24)	0	0	(Portuguese Football Federation) Benfica
2	DF	Diogo Dalot	18 March 1999 (age 27)	42	3	(The Football Association) Manchester United
3	DF	Gonçalo Inácio	25 August 2001 (age 25)	22	2	(Portuguese Football Federation) Sporting CP
4	DF	António Silva	30 October 2003 (age 23)	21	0	(The Football Association) Bournemouth
5	DF	Flávio Nazinho	20 July 2003 (age 23)	0	0	(French Football Federation) Monaco
13	DF	Renato Veiga	29 July 2003 (age 23)	24	1	(Royal Spanish Football Federation) Villarreal
14	DF	Alberto Costa	29 September 2003 (age 23)	2	0	(Portuguese Football Federation) Porto
20	DF	João Cancelo (3rd captain)	27 May 1994 (age 32)	78	14	(Royal Spanish Football Federation) Barcelona
6	MF	Mateus Fernandes	10 July 2004 (age 22)	1	0	(The Football Association) Tottenham Hotspur
8	MF	Bruno Fernandes (Vice-captain)	8 September 1994 (age 32)	99	30	(The Football Association) Manchester United
15	MF	João Neves	27 September 2004 (age 22)	33	4	(French Football Federation) Paris Saint-Germain
21	MF	Rúben Neves	13 March 1997 (age 29)	74	1	(Saudi Arabian Football Federation) Al-Hilal
23	MF	Vitinha	13 February 2000 (age 26)	49	1	(French Football Federation) Paris Saint-Germain
7	FW	Carlos Forbs	19 March 2004 (age 22)	3	1	(Royal Belgian Football Association) Club Brugge
9	FW	Gonçalo Ramos	20 June 2001 (age 25)	33	14	(Italian Football Federation) AC Milan
10	FW	João Félix	10 November 1999 (age 27)	63	15	(Saudi Arabian Football Federation) Al-Nassr
11	FW	Geovany Quenda	30 April 2007 (age 19)	1	0	(The Football Association) Chelsea
16	FW	Francisco Trincão	29 December 1999 (age 26)	24	3	(Saudi Arabian Football Federation) Al-Ahli
17	FW	Pedro Neto	9 March 2000 (age 26)	35	4	(The Football Association) Chelsea
18	FW	Fábio Silva	19 July 2002 (age 24)	1	0	(German Football Association) Borussia Dortmund
19	FW	Rodrigo Mora	5 May 2007 (age 19)	0	0	(Italian Football Federation) Roma
	FW	Gustavo Varela	30 January 2005 (age 21)	0	0	(Italian Football Federation) Monza

=== Recent call-ups ===
The following players have also been called up to the Portugal squad within the last twelve months.

Pos.	Player	Date of birth (age)	Caps	Goals	Club	Latest call-up
GK	José Sá	17 January 1993 (age 33)	5	0	(England) Wolverhampton Wanderers	2026 FIFA World Cup
GK	Ricardo Velho	20 August 1998 (age 28)	1	0	(Greece) Aris	v. Nigeria, 10 June 2026
DF	Rúben Dias (3rd captain)	14 May 1997 (age 29)	85	3	(England) Manchester City	v. Wales, 17 November 2026 ^{SUS}
DF	Tomás Araújo	16 May 2002 (age 24)	7	0	(Portugal) Benfica	v. Denmark, 14 November 2026 ^{INJ}
DF	Nuno Tavares	26 January 2000 (age 26)	5	0	(Italy) Lazio	v. Denmark, 14 November 2026 ^{INJ}
DF	Nuno Mendes	19 June 2002 (age 24)	53	2	(France) Paris Saint-Germain	v. Norway, 4 October 2026
DF	Nélson Semedo	16 November 1993 (age 33)	54	0	(Turkey) Fenerbahçe	2026 FIFA World Cup
MF	Bernardo Silva (Captain)	10 August 1994 (age 32)	116	15	(Spain) Real Madrid	v. Wales, 17 November 2026 ^{INJ}
MF	João Palhinha	9 July 1995 (age 31)	41	2	(Portugal) Benfica	v. Wales, 17 November 2026 ^{SUS}
MF	Matheus Nunes	27 August 1998 (age 28)	21	2	(England) Manchester City	2026 FIFA World Cup
MF	Samú Costa	27 November 2000 (age 25)	7	0	(Saudi Arabia) Al-Nassr	2026 FIFA World Cup
FW	Rafael Leão	10 June 1999 (age 27)	51	6	(Turkey) Galatasaray	v. Denmark, 14 November 2026 ^{INJ}
FW	Francisco Conceição	14 December 2002 (age 23)	23	4	(Italy) Juventus	v. Norway, 4 October 2026
FW	Cristiano Ronaldo ^{RET}	5 February 1985 (age 41)	234	146	(Saudi Arabia) Al-Nassr	v. Denmark, 1 October 2026 ^{WD}
FW	Gonçalo Guedes	29 November 1996 (age 29)	34	8	(Spain) Real Sociedad	2026 FIFA World Cup
FW	Ricardo Horta	15 September 1994 (age 32)	13	4	(Portugal) Braga	v. United States, 31 March 2026
FW	Paulinho	9 November 1992 (age 34)	5	2	(Mexico) Toluca	v. United States, 31 March 2026
FW	Pedro Gonçalves	28 June 1998 (age 28)	4	0	(Italy) Fiorentina	v. United States, 31 March 2026
^{INJ} Player withdrew from the squad due to an injury^{FIT} Player withdrew from the squad due to fitness concerns^{PRE} Preliminary squad^{RET} Player retired from international football^{WD} Player withdrew from the squad due to a non-injury issue^{SUS} Serving Suspension

== Individual statistics ==
As of match played 17 November 2026.
Players in bold are still active.

=== Most appearances ===
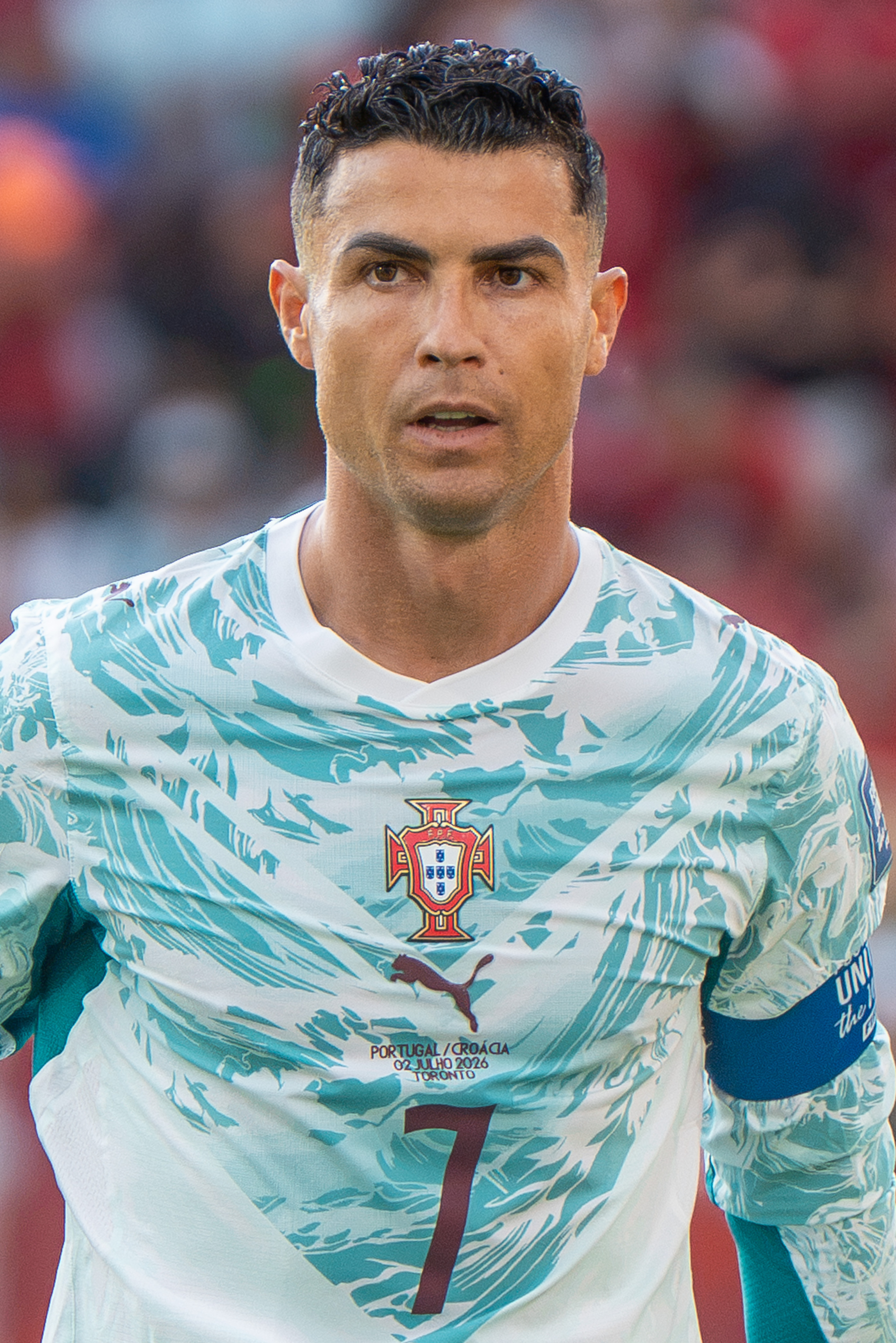
Cristiano Ronaldo is Portugal's most capped player and all-time top scorer.

Rank	Player	Caps	Goals	Career
1	Cristiano Ronaldo	234	146	2003–2026
2	João Moutinho	146	7	2005–2022
3	Pepe	141	8	2007–2024
4	Luís Figo	127	32	1991–2006
5	**Bernardo Silva**	116	15	2015–present
6	Nani	112	24	2006–2017
7	Fernando Couto	110	8	1990–2004
8	Rui Patrício	108	0	2010–2024
9	**Bruno Fernandes**	99	30	2017–present
10	Bruno Alves	96	11	2007–2018

=== Top goalscorers ===
Rank	Player	Goals	Caps	Ratio	Career
1	Cristiano Ronaldo (list)	146	234	0.62	2003–2026
2	Pauleta (list)	47	88	0.53	1997–2006
3	Eusébio (list)	41	64	0.64	1961–1973
4	Luís Figo	32	127	0.25	1991–2006
5	**Bruno Fernandes**	30	99	0.29	2017–present
6	Nuno Gomes	29	79	0.37	1996–2011
7	Hélder Postiga	27	71	0.38	2003–2014
8	Rui Costa	26	94	0.28	1993–2004
9	Nani	24	112	0.21	2006–2017
10	João Pinto	23	81	0.28	1991–2002

=== Goal records ===
Most goals scored in World Cup
11 – Cristiano Ronaldo (2006, 2010, 2014, 2018, 2022 and 2026)
Most goals scored in one World Cup
9 – Eusébio (1966)
Most goals scored in one European Championship
5 – Cristiano Ronaldo (2020)
Most goals scored in European Championship
14 – Cristiano Ronaldo (2004, 2008, 2012, 2016 and 2020)
Oldest goalscorer
41 years, 4 months and 27 days – Cristiano Ronaldo (2–1 against Croatia on 2 July 2026)
Youngest goalscorer
17 years, 9 months and 25 days – Fernando Chalana (2–1 against Cyprus on 5 December 1976)
Most hat-tricks
10 – Cristiano Ronaldo (includes four goals against Andorra on 7 October 2016 and Lithuania on 10 September 2019)
Most pokers
2 – Cristiano Ronaldo
Youngest player to score a hat-trick
20 years, 11 months and 4 days – André Silva (6–0 against Faroe Islands on 10 October 2016)

=== Other records ===
Most matches played in World Cup
27 – Cristiano Ronaldo (2006, 2010, 2014, 2018, 2022 and 2026)
Most matches played in European Championship
30 – Cristiano Ronaldo (2004, 2008, 2012, 2016, 2020 and 2024)
Oldest player (outfield or goalkeeper)
41 years, 7 months and 19 days – Cristiano Ronaldo (1–0 against Wales on 24 September 2026)
Longest national career (outfield or goalkeeper)
23 years, 1 month and 4 days – Cristiano Ronaldo (from 20 August 2003 to 24 September 2026)
Youngest debutant
17 years, 6 months and 24 days – Paulo Futre (5–0 against Finland on 21 September 1983)
Youngest player to reach 100 caps
27 years, 8 months and 11 days – Cristiano Ronaldo (1–1 against Northern Ireland on 16 October 2012)
Youngest player to reach 200 caps
38 years, 4 months and 15 days – Cristiano Ronaldo (1–0 against Iceland on 20 June 2023)

== Competitive record ==
Champions Runners-up Third place Hosts

=== FIFA World Cup ===
FIFA World Cup record									Qualification record						
Year	Round	Position	Pld	W	D*	L	GF	GA	Position	Pld	W	D	L	GF	GA
(Uruguay) 1930	Did not enter								Did not enter						
(Kingdom of Italy) 1934	Did not qualify								2nd	2	0	0	2	1	11
(French Third Republic) 1938	Did not qualify								2nd	1	0	0	1	1	2
(Fourth Brazilian Republic) 1950	Did not qualify								2nd	2	0	1	1	3	7
(Switzerland) 1954	Did not qualify								2nd	2	0	1	1	1	9
(Sweden) 1958	Did not qualify								3rd	4	1	1	2	4	7
(Chile) 1962	Did not qualify								2nd	4	1	1	2	9	7
(England) 1966	Third place	3rd	6	5	0	1	17	8	1st	6	4	1	1	9	4
(Mexico) 1970	Did not qualify								4th	6	1	2	3	8	10
(West Germany) 1974	Did not qualify								2nd	6	2	3	1	10	6
(Argentina) 1978	Did not qualify								2nd	6	4	1	1	12	6
(Spain) 1982	Did not qualify								4th	8	3	1	4	8	11
(Mexico) 1986	Group stage	17th	3	1	0	2	2	4	2nd	8	5	0	3	12	10
(Italy) 1990	Did not qualify								3rd	8	4	2	2	11	8
(United States) 1994	Did not qualify								3rd	10	6	2	2	18	5
(France) 1998	Did not qualify								3rd	10	5	4	1	12	4
(South Korea) (Japan) 2002	Group stage	21st	3	1	0	2	6	4	1st	10	7	3	0	33	7
(Germany) 2006	Fourth place	4th	7	4	1	2	7	5	1st	12	9	3	0	35	5
(South Africa) 2010	Round of 16	11th	4	1	2	1	7	1	P/O	12	7	4	1	19	5
(Brazil) 2014	Group stage	18th	3	1	1	1	4	7	P/O	12	8	3	1	24	11
(Russia) 2018	Round of 16	13th	4	1	2	1	6	6	1st	10	9	0	1	32	4
(Qatar) 2022	Quarter-finals	8th	5	3	0	2	12	6	P/O	10	7	2	1	22	7
(Canada) (Mexico) (United States) 2026	Round of 16	13th	5	2	2	1	8	3	1st	6	4	1	1	20	7
(Morocco) (Portugal) (Spain) 2030	Qualified as co-hosts								Qualified as co-hosts						
(Saudi Arabia) 2034	To be determined								To be determined						
Total:9/23	Third place		40	19	8	13	69	44	—	155	87	36	32	304	153

FIFA World Cup history
First match	Portugal 3–1 Hungary (13 July 1966; Manchester, England)
Biggest win	Portugal 7–0 North Korea (21 June 2010; Cape Town, South Africa)
Biggest defeat	Germany 4–0 Portugal (16 June 2014; Salvador, Brazil)
Best result	Third place in 1966
Worst result	Group stage in 1986, 2002, 2014

* Draws include knockout matches decided via penalty shoot-out. Red border colour indicates that the tournament was held on home soil.

=== UEFA European Championship ===
UEFA European Championship record									Qualification record					
Year	Round	Position	Pld	W	D*	L	GF	GA	Pld	W	D	L	GF	GA
(France) 1960	Did not qualify								4	3	0	1	8	8
(Spain) 1964	Did not qualify								3	1	0	2	4	5
(Italy) 1968	Did not qualify								6	2	2	2	6	6
(Belgium) 1972	Did not qualify								6	3	1	2	10	6
(Socialist Federal Republic of Yugoslavia) 1976	Did not qualify								6	2	3	1	5	7
(Italy) 1980	Did not qualify								8	4	1	3	10	11
(France) 1984	Semi-finals	4th	4	1	2	1	4	4	6	5	0	1	11	6
(West Germany) 1988	Did not qualify								8	2	4	2	6	8
(Sweden) 1992	Did not qualify								8	5	1	2	11	4
(England) 1996	Quarter-finals	5th	4	2	1	1	5	2	10	7	2	1	29	7
(Belgium) (Netherlands) 2000	Semi-finals	4th	5	4	0	1	10	4	10	7	2	1	32	4
(Portugal) 2004	Runners-up	2nd	6	3	1	2	8	6	Qualified as hosts					
(Austria) (Switzerland) 2008	Quarter-finals	7th	4	2	0	2	7	6	14	7	6	1	24	10
(Poland) (Ukraine) 2012	Semi-finals	4th	5	3	1	1	6	4	10	6	2	2	27	14
(France) 2016	Champions	1st	7	3	4	0	9	5	8	7	0	1	11	5
(Europe) 2020	Round of 16	13th	4	1	1	2	7	7	8	5	2	1	22	6
(Germany) 2024	Quarter-finals	8th	5	2	2	1	5	3	10	10	0	0	36	2
(England) (Scotland) (Republic of Ireland) (Wales) 2028	To be determined								To be determined					
(Italy) (Turkey) 2032	To be determined								To be determined					
Total	1 Title	9/19	44	21	12	11	61	41	125	76	26	23	252	109

UEFA European Championship history
First match	Portugal 0–0 West Germany (14 June 1984; Strasbourg, France)
Biggest win	Portugal 3–0 Croatia (19 June 1996; Nottingham, England)
Biggest win	Portugal 3–0 Germany (20 June 2000; Rotterdam, Netherlands)
Biggest win	Portugal 3–0 Hungary (15 June 2021; Budapest, Hungary)
Biggest win	Portugal 3–0 Turkey (22 June 2024; Dortmund, Germany)
Biggest defeat	Switzerland 2–0 Portugal (15 June 2008; Basel, Switzerland)
Biggest defeat	Germany 4–2 Portugal (19 June 2021; Munich, Germany)
Biggest defeat	Georgia 2–0 Portugal (26 June 2024; Gelsenkirchen, Germany)
Best result	Champions in 2016
Worst result	Round of 16 in 2020

* Draws include knockout matches decided via penalty shoot-out. Red border colour indicates that the tournament was held on home soil.

=== UEFA Nations League ===
UEFA Nations League record
League phase / quarter-finals												Finals								
Season	LG	Grp	Pos	Pld	W	D	L	GF	GA	P/R	IR	Year	Pld	W	D*	L	GF	GA	Squad	OR
2018–19	A	3	1st	4	2	2	0	5	3	Same position	2nd	(Portugal) 2019	2	2	0	0	4	1	Squad	1st
2020–21	A	3	2nd	6	4	1	1	12	4	Same position	5th	(Italy) 2021	Did not qualify							5th
2022–23	A	2	2nd	6	3	1	2	11	3	Same position	6th	(Netherlands) 2023	Did not qualify							6th
2024–25	A	1	1st	6	4	2	0	13	5	Same position	3rd	(Germany) 2025	2	1	1	0	4	3	Squad	1st
2024–25	A	Quarter-final		2	1	0	1	5	3	Same position	3rd	(Germany) 2025	2	1	1	0	4	3	Squad	1st
2026–27	A	4	1st	6	5	0	1	13	10	Same position	2nd	2027	To be determined							TBD
2026–27	A	Quarter-final		0	0	0	0	0	0	Same position	2nd	2027	To be determined							TBD
Total				30	19	6	5	59	28	2nd		Total Finals:2/4	4	3	1	0	8	4	2 Titles	

UEFA Nations League history
First match	Portugal 1–0 Italy (10 September 2018; Lisbon, Portugal)
Biggest win	Portugal 4–0 Switzerland (5 June 2022; Lisbon, Portugal)
Biggest win	Portugal 5–1 Poland (15 November 2024; Porto, Portugal)
Biggest defeat	Portugal 1–4 Denmark (14 November 2026; Braga, Portugal)
Best result	Champions in 2018–19, 2024–25
Worst result	6th place in 2022–23

* Draws include knockout matches decided via penalty shoot-out. Red border colour indicates that the tournament was held on home soil.
* League phase is played home and away. Flag shown represents hosts nations for the finals.

=== FIFA Confederations Cup ===
FIFA Confederations Cup record
Year	Round	Position	Pld	W	D*	L	GF	GA
(Saudi Arabia) 1992	Did not qualify							
(Saudi Arabia) 1995	Did not qualify							
(Saudi Arabia) 1997	Did not qualify							
(Mexico) 1999	Did not qualify							
(South Korea) (Japan) 2001	Did not qualify							
(France) 2003	Did not qualify							
(Germany) 2005	Did not qualify							
(South Africa) 2009	Did not qualify							
(Brazil) 2013	Did not qualify							
(Russia) 2017	Third place	3rd	5	3	2	0	9	3
Total	Third place	1/10	5	3	2	0	9	3

FIFA Confederations Cup history
First match	Portugal 2–2 Mexico (18 June 2017; Kazan, Russia)
Biggest win	Portugal 4–0 New Zealand (24 June 2017; Saint Petersburg, Russia)
Biggest defeat	—
Best result	Third place in 2017
Worst result	—

* Draws include knockout matches decided via penalty shoot-out. Red border colour indicates that the tournament was held on home soil.

=== All-time results ===
The following table shows Portugal's all-time international record, correct as of 23 June 2026.

	Played	Won	Drawn	Lost	GF	GA
Total	705	353	161	191	1240	789

Source: Portugal - Historical results

== Honours ==
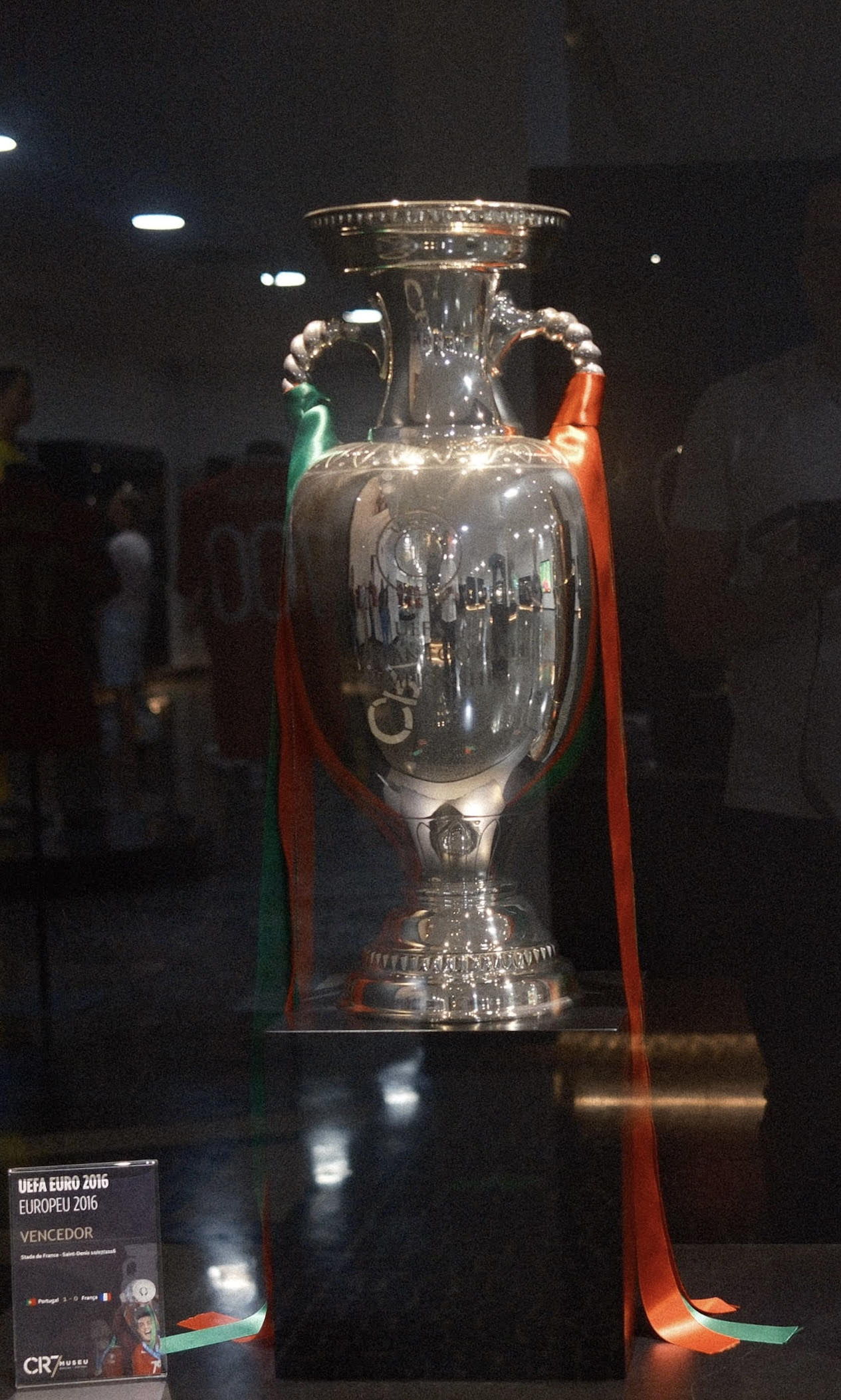
The UEFA Euro 2016 trophy in the Museu CR7, Madeira, Portugal

=== Global ===
- FIFA World Cup
  - Third place: 1966
- FIFA Confederations Cup
  - Third place: 2017

=== Continental ===
- UEFA European Championship
  - Champions: 2016
  - Runners-up: 2004
- UEFA Nations League
  - Champions: 2019, 2025

=== Awards ===
- FIFA World Cup Most Entertaining Team: 2006
- Globe Soccer Awards Best National Football Team: 2025

=== Summary ===
Competition	1st place, gold medalist(s)	2nd place, silver medalist(s)	3rd place, bronze medalist(s)	Total
FIFA World Cup	0	0	1	1
FIFA Confederations Cup	0	0	1	1
UEFA European Championship	1	1	0	2
UEFA Nations League	2	0	0	2
Total	3	1	2	6

== See also ==
- Portugal national football team results
- List of Portugal international footballers
- List of Portugal national football team managers
- Portugal Olympic football team
- Portugal national under-21 football team
- Portugal national under-20 football team
- Portugal national under-19 football team
- Portugal national under-18 football team
- Portugal national under-17 football team
- Portugal national under-16 football team
- Portugal national under-15 football team
- Portugal national youth football team

Achievements
Preceded by 2012 Spain	European Champions; 2016 (First title)	Succeeded by 2020 Italy
Preceded by Inaugural	Nations League Champions; 2019 (First title)	Succeeded by 2021 France
