= List of Portugal national football team captains =

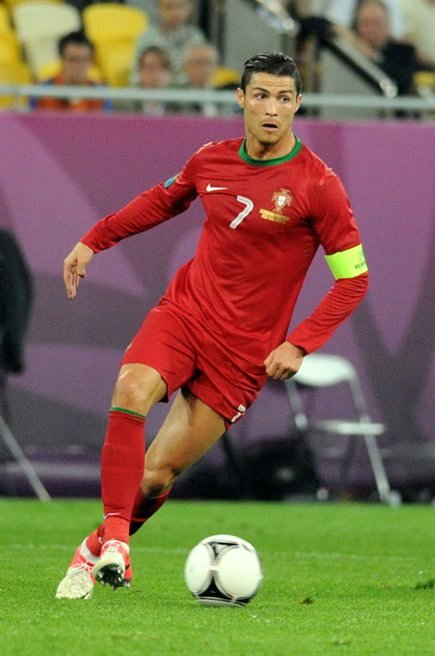
Cristiano Ronaldo is the longest-serving captain in Portugal history leading the team for 19 years

The first Portugal captain was Cândido de Oliveira, who captained Portugal in the international match against Spain on 18 December 1921. This was his only international appearance. Vítor Gonçalves captained Portugal in their first international on home soil, on 17 December 1922 against the same opposition. The current individual with the most caps, as captain of the Portugal team is Cristiano Ronaldo.

== List of captains ==
As of 4 October 2026

#	Player	Portugal career	Caps as captain (Note: When applicable, the columns sort the number of caps recognized by the Portuguese Football Federation, written in parentheses. The 2007 friendly in Kuwait was in fact an against Al-Salmiya although FIFA at the time recognized the team as a legitimate representative of the Kuwait Football Association and sanctioned the game which resulted in being accepted as a full international match and as such FIFA awarded caps.)	Total caps	First captaincy	Last captaincy	Ref(s)
1	Cândido de Oliveira	1921	1	1	18 December 1921	18 December 1921	
2	Vítor Gonçalves	1921–1922	1	2	17 December 1922	17 December 1922	
3	Alberto Rio	1922–1923	1	2	16 December 1923	16 December 1923	
4	Jorge Vieira	1921–1928	13 (15) (Note: Includes two caps recognized by the Portuguese Football Federation but not by FIFA, against Czechoslovakia Amateurs and Spain B played in 1926 and 1927 respectively.)	15 (17)	17 May 1925	4 June 1928	
5	Augusto Silva	1925–1934	8	20 (21) (Note: Includes one cap recognized by the Portuguese Football Federation but not by FIFA, against Spain B played in 1927.)	17 March 1929	18 March 1934	
6	Francisco Serra e Moura	1928–1930	1	3	12 January 1930	12 January 1930	
7	Tamanqueiro	1925–1930	1	15 (17)	23 February 1930	23 February 1930	
8	António Roquete	1926–1933	1	15 (16)	8 June 1930	8 June 1930	
9	João Santos	1926–1931	1	9 (11)	30 November 1930	30 November 1930	
10	Valdemar Mota	1928–1936	2	21	12 April 1931	31 May 1931	
11	Gustavo Teixeira	1930–1938	7 (9) (Note: Includes two caps recognized by the Portuguese Football Federation but not by FIFA, both against Spain Nationalist played in 1937 and 1938.)	8 (10)	5 May 1935	6 November 1938	
12	Adolfo Mourão	1934–1942	2	13 (15)	12 February 1939	12 January 1941	
13	Gaspar Pinto	1934–1942	1	6 (7) (Note: Includes one cap recognized by the Portuguese Football Federation but not by FIFA, against Spain Nationalist played in 1937.)	28 January 1940	28 January 1940	
14	Pinga	1930–1942	2	19 (21)	16 March 1941	1 January 1942	
15	Álvaro Cardoso	1941–1947	10	13	11 March 1945	25 May 1947	
16	Fernando Peyroteo	1938–1949	1	20	23 November 1947	23 November 1947	
17	Francisco Ferreira	1940–1951	12	25	21 March 1948	17 June 1951	
18	Octávio Barrosa	1945–1950	1	7	21 May 1950	21 May 1950	
19	José Travassos	1947–1958	2	35	8 April 1951	18 December 1955	
20	Serafim Neves	1945–1953	1	18	20 April 1952	20 April 1952	
21	Ângelo Carvalho	1950–1955	2	15	23 November 1952	14 December 1952	
22	Serafim Baptista	1950–1953	1	6	27 September 1953	27 September 1953	
23	Manuel Passos	1952–1957	15	17	21 November 1953	24 March 1957	
24	José Maria Pedroto	1952–1957	4	17	1 May 1957	16 June 1957	
25	Virgílio Mendes	1949–1960	9	39	22 December 1957	8 May 1960	
26	Fernando Mendes	1959–1965	5	21	21 June 1959	7 June 1964	
27	José Águas	1952–1962	7	25	11 November 1959	17 May 1962	
28	Hernâni da Silva	1953–1964	1	28	7 November 1962	7 November 1962	
29	Mário Coluna	1955–1968	21	57	16 December 1962	11 December 1968	
30	Germano de Figueiredo	1953–1966	9	24	15 November 1964	16 July 1966	
31	José Augusto	1958–1968	7	45	25 January 1965	17 December 1967	
32	Fernando Peres	1964–1972	2	27	6 April 1969	10 May 1972	
33	Hilário da Conceição	1959–1971	5	40	16 April 1969	17 February 1971	
34	Eusébio	1961–1973	16	64	4 May 1969	13 October 1973	
35	José Carlos	1961–1971	4	36	10 December 1969	12 May 1971	
36	Humberto Coelho	1968–1983	40 (41) (Note: Includes one cap recognized by the Portuguese Football Federation but not by FIFA, against Goiás played in 1975.)	63 (64)	14 November 1973	27 April 1983	
37	Toni	1969–1978	4	32 (33)	19 November 1975	16 October 1976	
38	Nené	1971–1984	6	65 (66)	5 December 1976	28 October 1983	
39	João Alves	1974–1983	1	35 (36)	24 September 1980	24 September 1980	
40	Manuel Bento	1976–1986	26	63	15 October 1980	3 June 1986	
41	Fernando Gomes	1975–1988	6	47 (48)	23 February 1983	16 November 1988	
42	Carlos Coelho	1982–1983	1	3	8 June 1983	8 June 1983	
43	Manuel Fernandes	1975–1987	5	30 (31)	12 October 1986	29 March 1987	
44	Álvaro Magalhães	1981–1988	1	20	4 February 1987	4 February 1987	
45	João Domingos Pinto	1983–1996	44	70	11 November 1987	9 November 1996	
46	Dito	1981–1987	1	17	5 December 1987	5 December 1987	
47	Frederico Rosa	1985–1989	1	18	20 December 1987	20 December 1987	
48	Rui Jordão	1972–1989	2	43	12 October 1988	25 January 1989	
49	António Veloso	1981–1994	1	40	29 August 1990	29 August 1990	
50	Paulo Futre	1983–1995	4	41	31 March 1993	10 November 1993	
51	Oceano	1985–1998	4	54	19 June 1993	11 October 1997	
52	Vítor Paneira	1988–1996	1	44	20 April 1994	20 April 1994	
53	Nelo	1990–1995	1 (2) (Note: Includes one cap recognized by the Portuguese Football Federation but not by FIFA, against a team representing the Danish league played in 1995 for the SkyDome Cup.)	10 (11)	26 January 1995	29 January 1995	
54	Jorge Costa	1992–2002	1	49 (50)	3 June 1995	3 June 1995	
55	Vítor Baía	1990–2002	40	80	3 September 1995	25 May 2002	
56	Fernando Couto	1990–2004	44	110	12 December 1995	12 June 2004	
57	Luís Figo	1991–2006	23	127	2 June 2001	5 July 2006	
58	João Vieira Pinto	1991–2002	1	81	6 June 2001	6 June 2001	
59	Pauleta	1997–2006	9	88	4 September 2004	8 July 2006	
60	Costinha	1998–2006	8	53	8 September 2004	11 October 2006	
61	Nuno Gomes	1996–2011	9	79	15 November 2006	19 June 2008	
62	Cristiano Ronaldo	2003–2026	172	234	6 February 2007	24 September 2026	
63	Jorge Andrade	2001–2007	4	51	24 March 2007	22 August 2009	
64	Deco	2003–2010	2	75	5 June 2007	31 March 2009	
65	Fernando Meira	2000–2008	1	54	15 June 2008	15 June 2008	
66	Simão Sabrosa	1998–2010	8	85	20 August 2008	8 June 2010	
67	Ricardo Carvalho	2003–2016	5	89	10 June 2009	29 May 2016	
68	Bruno Alves	2007–2018	6	96	29 March 2011	16 June 2015	
69	Pepe	2007–2024	14	141	14 November 2012	21 March 2024	
70	Nani	2006–2017	9	112	15 October 2013	2 July 2017	
71	Vieirinha	2013–2016	1	25	17 November 2015	17 November 2015	
72	João Moutinho	2005–2022	6	146	2 June 2018	2 June 2022	
73	Beto	2009–2018	1	16	14 October 2018	14 October 2018	
74	Rui Patrício	2010–2024	2	108	17 November 2018	17 November 2022	
75	Bernardo Silva	2015–present	4	113	11 September 2023	16 November 2025	
76	Rúben Dias	2018–present	2	80	4 June 2024	27 September 2026	
77	João Cancelo	2016–present	1	73	18 November 2024	18 November 2024	
78	Bruno Fernandes	2017–present	5	95	28 March 2026	4 October 2026	

== Unofficial captaincies ==
The following players captained a side in a FIFA-declared unofficial match. Nevertheless, the Portuguese Football Federation has decided to award caps to the intervening footballers and as a result these matches were taken into account in the above table.

#	Captain	Opponent	Score (Note: Portugal's score is shown first.)	Venue	Date	Ref(s)
1	Jorge Vieira	Czechoslovakia Amateurs	1–1	Campo do Ameal, Porto	24 January 1926	
2	Jorge Vieira	Spain B	0–2	Estadio Metropolitano de Madrid, Madrid	29 May 1927	
3	Gustavo Teixeira	Spain Nationalists	2–1	Balaídos, Vigo	28 November 1937	
4	Gustavo Teixeira	Spain Nationalists	1–0	Campo das Salésias, Lisbon	30 January 1938	
5	Humberto Coelho	Goiás	1–2	Estádio Serra Dourada, Goiânia	9 March 1975	
6	Nelo	Denmark League	1–0	SkyDome, Toronto	29 January 1995	
