= Carlos Coelho =

Carlos Coelho may refer to:

- Carlos Coelho (footballer) (born 1953), Portuguese footballer who plays as a defender
- Carlos Coelho (politician) (born 1960), Portuguese politician
