= Career of Cristiano Ronaldo =

Portuguese footballing career

Cristiano Ronaldo is a Portuguese professional footballer who plays as a forward for and captains the Saudi Pro League club Al-Nassr. He is widely regarded as one of the greatest footballers in history, and his individual achievements include five Ballon d'Or awards. In recognition of his record-breaking goalscoring, Ronaldo received the special awards Outstanding Career Achievement from FIFA in 2021 and Champions League All-Time Top Scorer from UEFA in 2024.

Ronaldo was a member of Sporting CP's youth academy and joined the first team in 2002. Manchester United signed him for £12 million in 2003, an England record for a teenager. After evolving into a world class attacker, Ronaldo transferred to Real Madrid in 2009 for £80 million, the most expensive transfer in history at the time. He spent nine seasons with Madrid, winning four Champions League titles and becoming the club's top goalscorer with 450 goals. Tensions with the Real Madrid hierarchy resulted in Ronaldo joining Juventus in 2018 for €100 million, where he went on to win all the major honours in Italian football. He returned to Manchester United in 2021, before signing with the Saudi Arabian club Al-Nassr in 2023, reportedly receiving the highest football salary in history. His transfer helped the Saudi Pro League attract other high-profile players.

Ronaldo made his international debut for Portugal in 2003 at the age of 18. He has earned more than 200 caps, making him history's most-capped male player. He has played in six FIFA World Cups and being the player who scored in six FIFA World Cups, five UEFA European Championships, and two UEFA Nations Leagues. With 146 international goals, he is the all-time top male goalscorer. He assumed captaincy of Portugal in 2008, and in 2015 was named the best Portuguese player of all time by the Portuguese Football Federation. He led Portugal to their first major title with a victory at UEFA Euro 2016, and also led them to victory in the inaugural UEFA Nations League in 2019, where he received the top scorer award in the finals. At Euro 2020 he received the Golden Boot, and in 2024 he became the player with the most international victories in men's football. Ronaldo announced his retirement from international football in 6th of November in 2026.

== Youth career ==
=== Andorinha and Nacional ===
From 1992 to 1995, Ronaldo played for Andorinha, where his father was the kit man. He later spent two years with Nacional, where he was named captain. In 1997, at age 12, he went on a three-day trial with Sporting CP. The club subsequently signed him for £1,500, and he moved from Madeira to Lisbon to join their youth system.

== Club career ==
=== Sporting CP ===
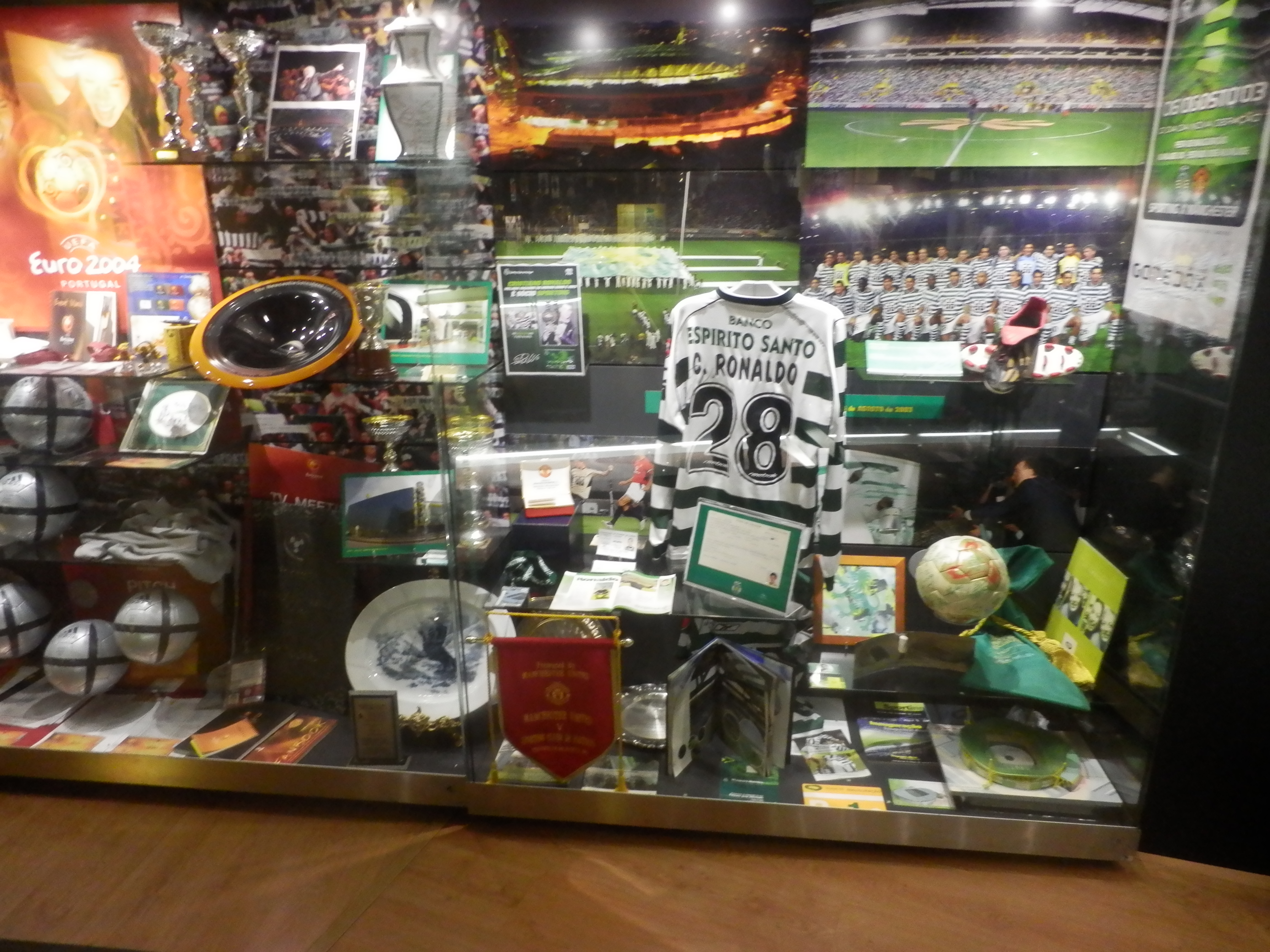
Ronaldo memorabilia at Sporting CP's museum

At age 16, Ronaldo was promoted from Sporting's youth team by first team manager László Bölöni, who was impressed with his dribbling. He subsequently became the first player to play for the club's under-16, under-17 and under-18 teams, the B team, and the first team, all within a single season. On 14 August 2002, the 17-year-old Ronaldo played his first official match for the first team, in a UEFA Champions League qualifying round against Inter Milan. He came on in the 58th minute.

In September, Ronaldo made his debut in the Primeira Liga against Braga, and in October, he scored two goals against Moreirense in Sporting's 3–0 win. The same month, Juventus executive Luciano Moggi prepared a €2.5 million offer for Ronaldo, which included Marcelo Salas in exchange. After Salas refused to accept the transfer, the talks collapsed. During the 2002–03 season, Ronaldo's representatives mentioned him to Liverpool manager Gérard Houllier and Barcelona president Joan Laporta. Arsenal manager Arsène Wenger met with Ronaldo in November to discuss a possible transfer. The French teams Auxerre and Lyon were also interested in signing him.

After Sporting defeated Manchester United 3–1 in August 2003, United manager Alex Ferguson was determined to acquire Ronaldo. He offered Sporting £12.24 million for Ronaldo, who he considered to be "one of the most exciting young players" he had ever seen.

=== Manchester United ===
==== 2003–2007: Development and breakthrough ====
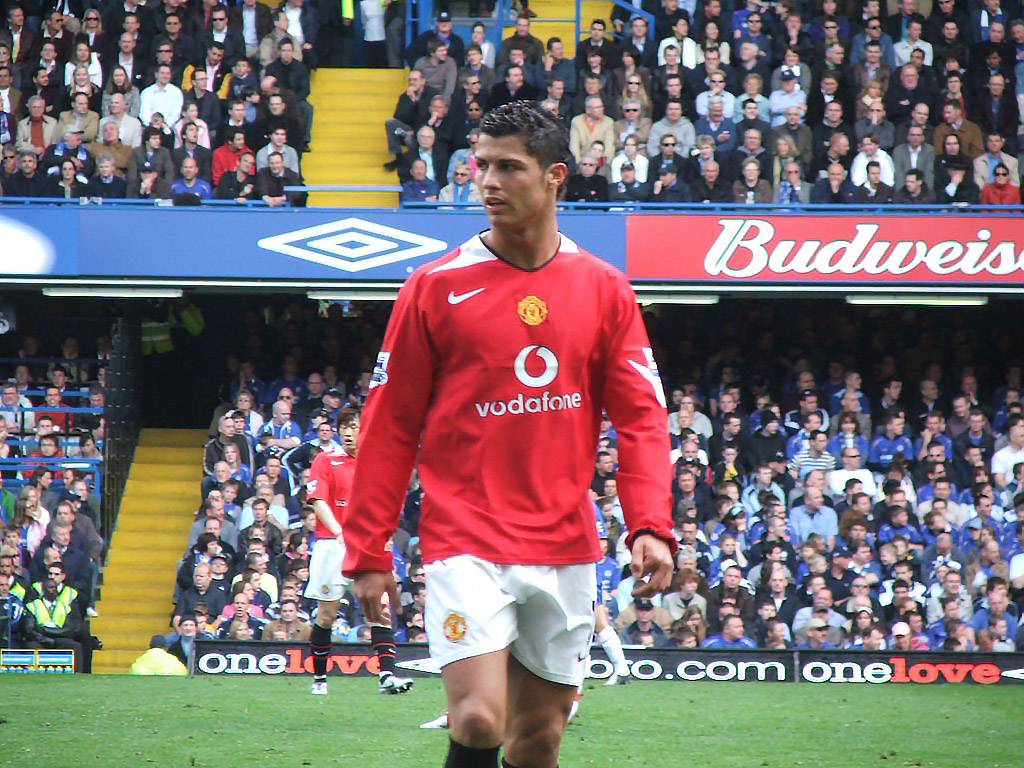
Ronaldo playing for Manchester United against Chelsea during the 2005–06 Premier League season

Ronaldo's move to Manchester United was completed on 12 August 2003, too late for the 2003 FA Community Shield match but in time for United's game against the Bolton Wanderers on the opening day of the 2003–04 season. He was the first Portuguese player to sign for the club. His transfer fee made him, at the time, the most expensive teenager in English football history. Although he requested the number 28, his number at Sporting, he received the squad number 7 shirt, which had previously been worn by the United players George Best, Eric Cantona and David Beckham. Wearing the number 7 became a source of motivation for Ronaldo. He would later describe Ferguson as his "father in sport" and "one of the most important and influential factors" in his career.

Ronaldo made his debut as a substitute in a 4–0 win over Bolton in the Premier League on 16 August 2003, and received a standing ovation when he came on for Nicky Butt. His performance earned praise from Best, who hailed it as "undoubtedly the most exciting debut" he had ever seen. Ronaldo scored his first goal for Manchester United with a free-kick in a 3–0 win over Portsmouth on 1 November. Three more league goals followed in the second half of the season. On the final day of the campaign, Ronaldo received the first red card of his career while playing against Aston Villa. Ronaldo ended his first season in England by scoring a goal in United's 3–0 win over Millwall in the 2004 FA Cup Final, which earned him his first trophy. BBC pundit Alan Hansen described him as the star of the final.

Ronaldo scored United's 1,000th Premier League goal on 29 October 2004, their only goal in a 4–1 loss to Middlesbrough. A few weeks later, he signed a new contract with the club that extended his previous deal by two years to 2010. At the start of 2005, Ronaldo contributed a goal and an assist against Aston Villa and scored twice against rivals Arsenal. Ronaldo won his second trophy in English football, the Football League Cup, after scoring the third goal in United's 4–0 final win over Wigan Athletic.

During his third season in England, Ronaldo was involved in several incidents. He was given a one-match ban by UEFA for a "one-fingered gesture" towards Benfica fans, and was sent off during United's 3–1 defeat in the Manchester derby for kicking Andy Cole of Manchester City. He clashed with his teammate Ruud van Nistelrooy, who took offence at Ronaldo's showboating style of play. During the 2006 FIFA World Cup, Ronaldo was involved in an incident which resulted in his club teammate Wayne Rooney being sent off. Afterwards, Ronaldo publicly asked for a transfer, saying that United had not supported him during the incident. United denied his request.

Although his World Cup altercation with Rooney resulted in Ronaldo being booed throughout the 2006–07 season, it proved to be his break-out year, as he scored 20 league goals for the first time and won his first Premier League title. An important factor in this success was his one-to-one training by first-team coach René Meulensteen, who taught him to make himself more unpredictable, improve his teamwork, call for the ball and capitalise on goalscoring opportunities rather than waiting for the chance to score aesthetically pleasing goals. Ronaldo had three consecutive two-goal games at the end of December. (Note: Attributed to multiple references:) He was named the Premier League Player of the Month in November and December.

==== 2007–2008: Collective and individual success ====
At the quarter-final stage of the 2006–07 UEFA Champions League, Ronaldo scored his first goals in the competition, scoring twice in a 7–1 win over Roma. He also scored once in the first semi-final leg against Milan, which ended in a 3–2 win. He scored the only goal in the Manchester derby on 5 May—his 50th goal for the club—as United won their first league title in four years. That season, he won the Player's Player, Fans' Player and Young Player of the Year awards from the Professional Footballers' Association, as well as the Footballer of the Year award from the Football Writers' Association. His wages were raised to £120,000 a week as part of a five-year contract extension. Ronaldo was runner-up to Kaká for the 2007 Ballon d'Or, and he came in third in voting for the 2007 FIFA World Player of the Year award, behind Kaká and Lionel Messi.

Ronaldo scored his first hat-trick for United in a 6–0 win against Newcastle United on 12 January 2008, which put United at the top of the league table. On 19 March, he captained United for the first time, scoring both goals in a 2–0 win over Bolton. His second goal was his 33rd goal of the season across all competitions, surpassing George Best's total of 32 goals during the 1967–68 season, and setting a new single-season record for a United midfielder. Ronaldo's 31 league goals earned him the Premier League Golden Boot, and he became the first winger to win the European Golden Shoe. He also received the PFA Players' Player of the Year award and the FWA Footballer of the Year award for the second consecutive season.

In the knockout stage of the 2008 UEFA Champions League, Ronaldo scored the decisive goal against Lyon to help United advance to the quarter-finals 2–1 on aggregate; while playing as a striker, he scored in the 3–0 aggregate win over Roma. United defeated Chelsea in a penalty shoot-out in the final, with Ronaldo scoring once. (Note: Attributed to multiple references:) As the Champions League top scorer, Ronaldo was named the UEFA Club Footballer of the Year.

Ronaldo scored a total of 42 goals in all competitions during the 2007–08 season, his most prolific campaign during his time in England. He missed three matches after headbutting a Portsmouth player; he said the experience taught him not to let opponents provoke him. As rumours circulated of Ronaldo's interest in moving to Real Madrid, United filed a tampering complaint with FIFA over Madrid's alleged pursuit of him, but FIFA declined to take action. FIFA president Sepp Blatter said a player should be allowed to leave their club, describing the situation as "modern slavery". Ronaldo publicly agreed with Blatter, but remained at United for another year.

==== 2008–2009: Ballon d'Or and continued success ====
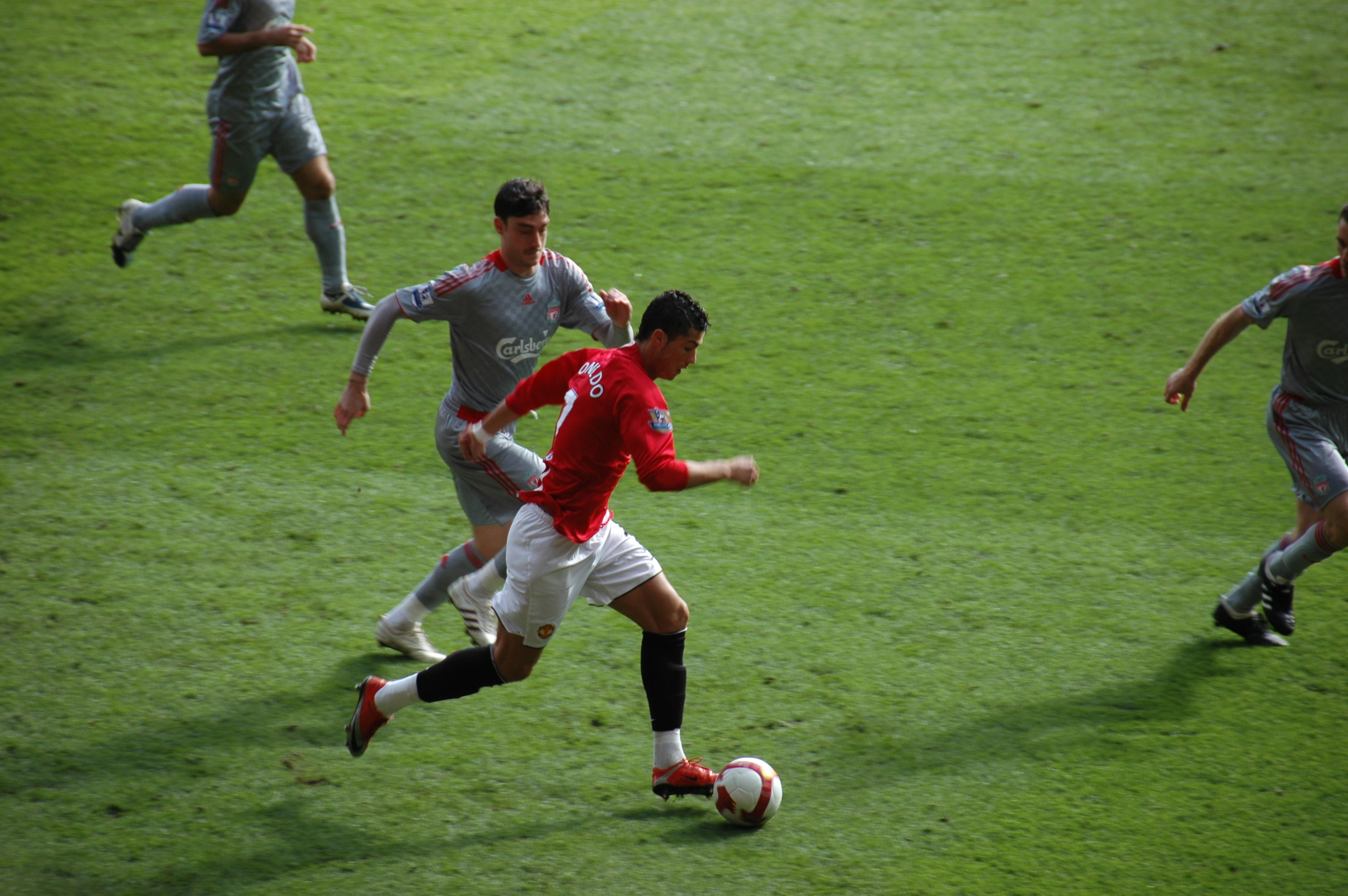
Ronaldo with Manchester United playing in a 2009 Premier League game against Liverpool

Ahead of the 2008–09 season, Ronaldo underwent ankle surgery on 7 July, which kept him out of action for 10 weeks. Following his return, he scored his 100th goal for United during a 5–0 win against Stoke City on 15 November, which meant he had now scored against all 19 opposing teams in the Premier League. At the close of 2008, Ronaldo helped United win the 2008 FIFA Club World Cup in Japan, assisting the final-winning goal against Liga de Quito and winning the Silver Ball in the process. Ronaldo won the 2008 Ballon d'Or and the 2008 FIFA World Player of the Year award, becoming United's first Ballon d'Or winner since George Best in 1968. Ronaldo's match-winning goal from 40 yards during the 2009 UEFA Champion's League quarter-finals against Porto earned him the inaugural FIFA Puskás Award, which recognizes the best goal of the year. United claimed their third consecutive league title in 2009 and won the Football League Cup; Ronaldo finished his time in England with a total of nine trophies.

=== Real Madrid ===
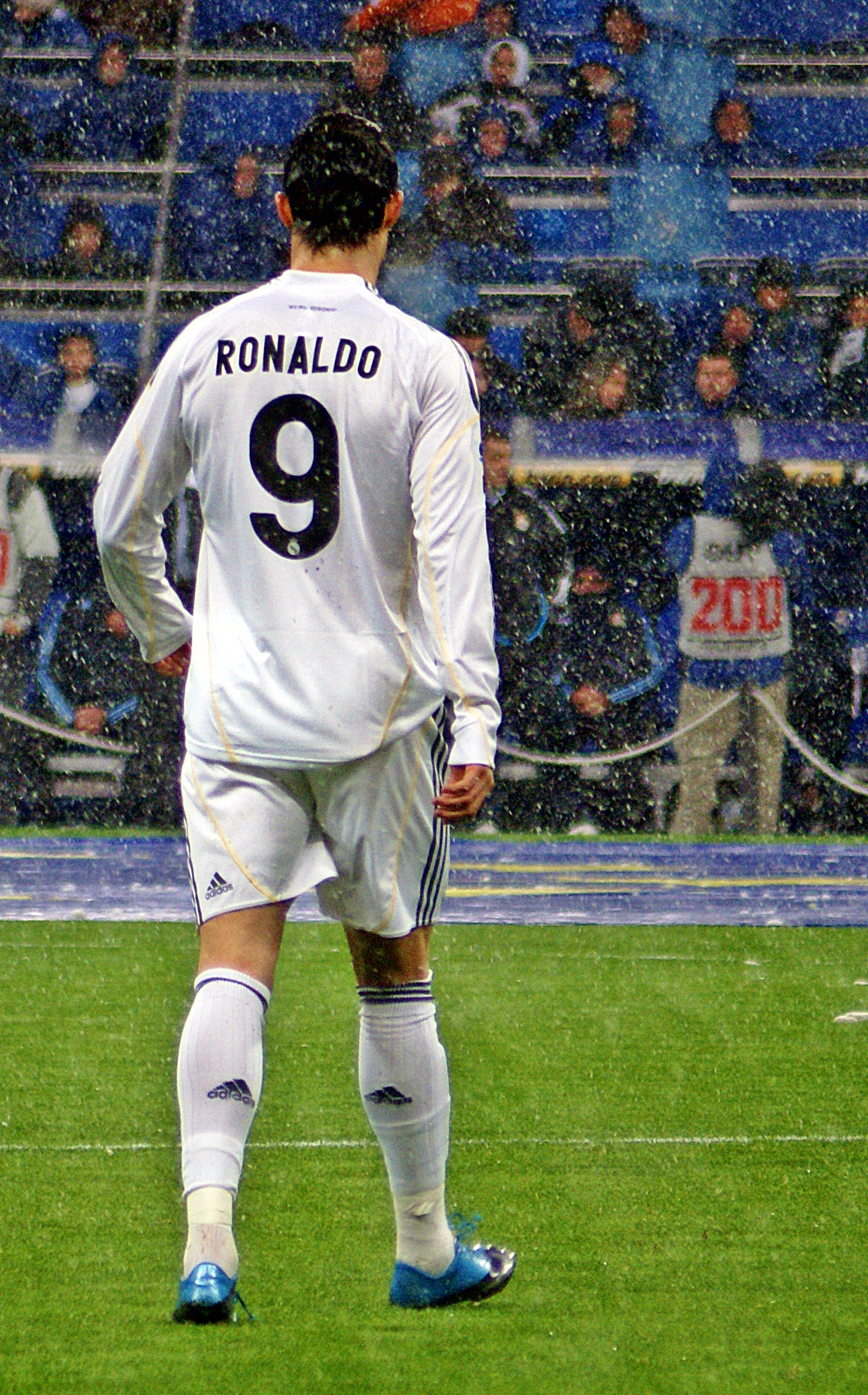
As his usual number 7 was unavailable, Ronaldo wore number 9 during his debut season at Madrid.

Ahead of the 2009–10 season, Ronaldo joined Real Madrid for a transfer fee of £80 million (€94 million), a world record at the time. His contract, which ran until 2015, was worth €11 million per year and contained a €1 billion buy-out clause. At least 80,000 fans attended his unveiling at the Santiago Bernabéu. Since club captain Raúl wore number 7—the number Ronaldo wore at United—Ronaldo wore number 9 during his first season with Madrid.

==== 2009–2013: La Liga title and goalscoring record ====
Ronaldo made his La Liga debut against Deportivo La Coruña on 29 August 2009, scoring from a penalty kick in a 3–2 win. He scored in each of his first four league games, the first Madrid player to do so. His strong start to the season was interrupted when he suffered an ankle injury in October while on international duty, which kept him sidelined for seven weeks. Midway through the season, Ronaldo finished second in voting for the 2009 Ballon d'Or and the 2009 FIFA World Player of the Year awards, behind Lionel Messi. He finished the 2009–10 season with 33 goals in all competitions, including a hat-trick during a 4–1 win against Mallorca in May 2010. He was the club's highest goalscorer that season, and helped Madrid earn a club-record 96 points in the league.

Following Raúl's departure ahead of the 2010–11 season, Ronaldo was given the number 7 shirt. On 23 October, he scored four goals during a 6–1 victory over Racing Santander, and subsequently scored hat-tricks against Athletic Bilbao, Levante, Villarreal and Málaga. (Note: Attributed to multiple references:) In April 2011, he scored the match-winning goal in the Copa del Rey Final to earn his first team trophy in Spain. He finished the season with a record 40 goals in La Liga, earning the Pichichi Trophy. He also won the European Golden Shoe for a second time, becoming the first player to win the award in different leagues.

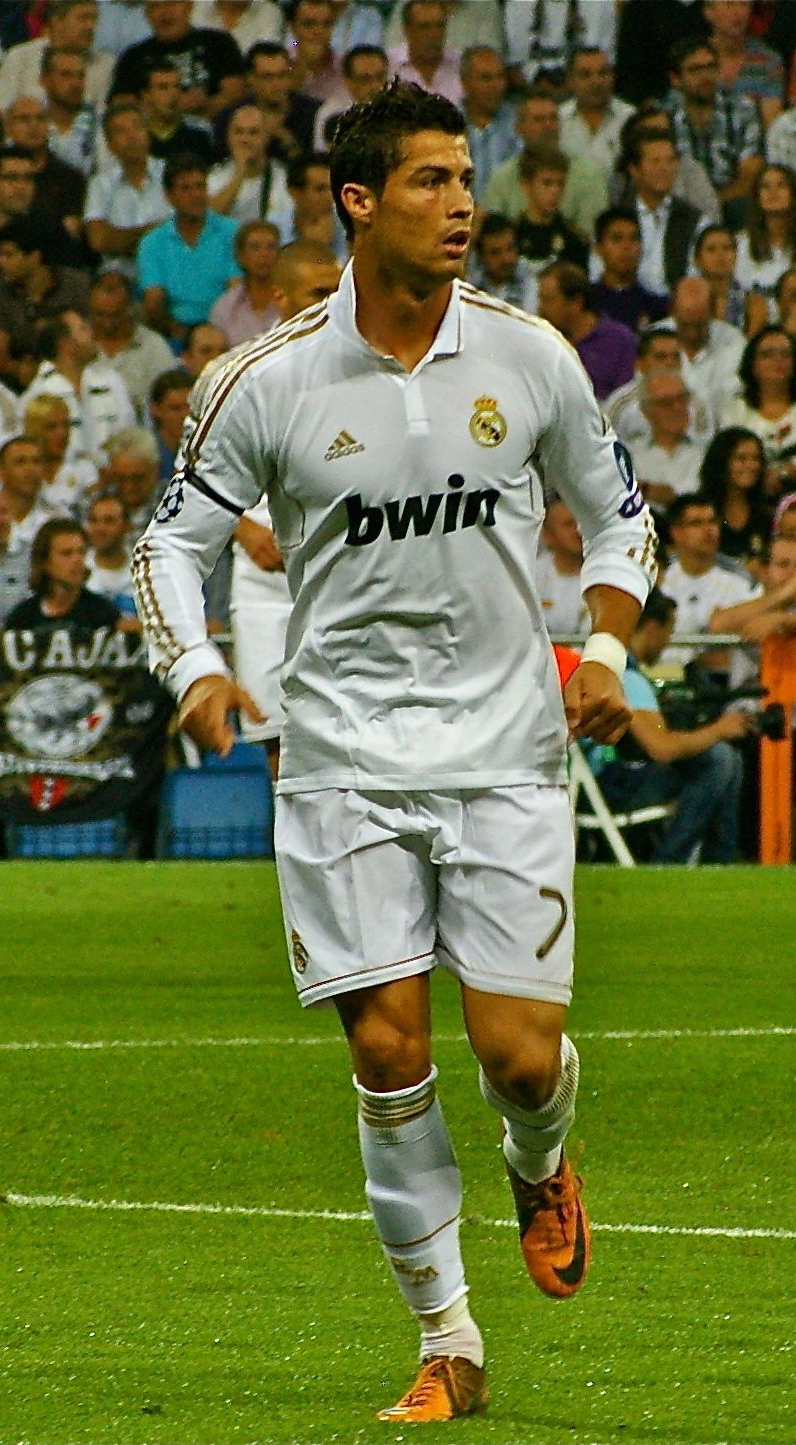
Ronaldo scored 46 league goals during his third season with Real Madrid.

During the following season, Ronaldo achieved a new personal best of 60 goals in all competitions. He finished as runner-up to Messi for the 2011 FIFA Ballon d'Or after scoring hat-tricks against Real Zaragoza, Rayo Vallecano, Málaga, Osasuna and Sevilla. (Note: Attributed to multiple references:) He helped Madrid win their first league title in four years with a record 100 points. During a 5–1 win over Real Sociedad on 24 March 2012, he surpassed Ferenc Puskás to become the fastest Real Madrid player to reach 100 league goals.

Ronaldo began the 2012–13 season by scoring a goal in each leg of the 2012 Supercopa de España, helping Spain defeat Barcelona on aggregate. In early October 2012, he scored his first hat-trick in the Champions League in a 4–1 win over Ajax. Four days later, he became the first player to score in six consecutive Clásicos when he scored two goals in a 2–2 draw with Barcelona at Camp Nou. Ronaldo was again the runner-up for the 2012 FIFA Ballon d'Or, behind four-time winner Messi.

Following the 2012–13 winter break, Ronaldo captained Madrid for the first time in an official match, scoring twice as Madrid defeated Real Sociedad 4–3. On 8 May, 2013, he scored his 200th goal for Madrid during a 6–2 win over Málaga. In the 2013 Copa del Rey Final, he scored the opening goal of an eventual 2–1 loss to Atlético, and was shown a red card for violent conduct. During the first knockout round of the Champions League, Ronaldo faced his former club Manchester United in two matches. He scored his team's only goal in a 1–1 draw in Madrid, then scored the winning goal in a 2–1 victory in Manchester. He did not celebrate scoring against his former club as a mark of respect. After scoring three goals against Galatasaray in the quarter-finals, he scored Madrid's only goal in a 4–1 loss to Borussia Dortmund in the semi-finals as Madrid were eliminated.

==== 2013–2015: Consecutive Ballon d'Or wins and UEFA Champions League title ====
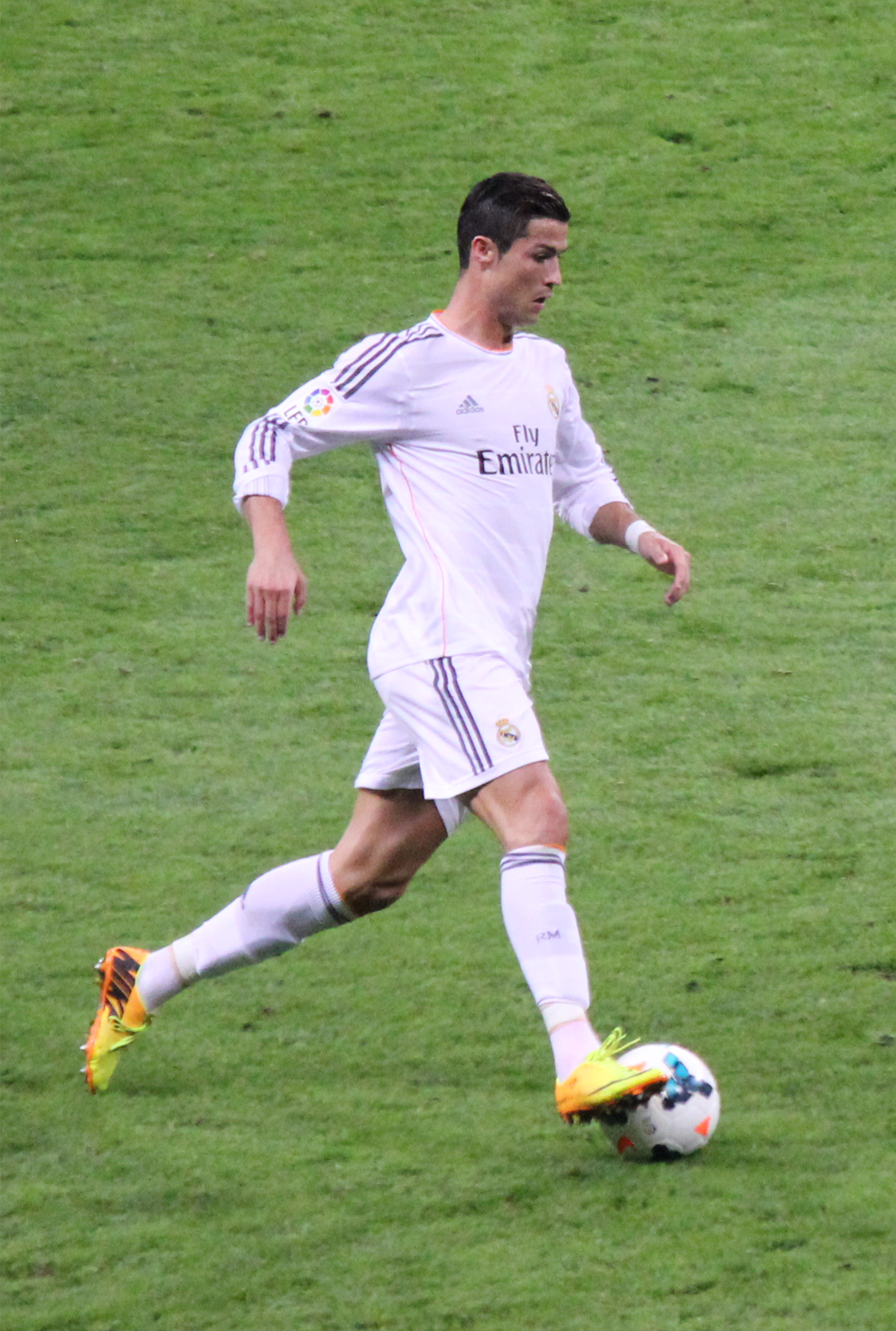
Ronaldo scored a record 17 UEFA Champions League goals during the 2013–14 season.

At the start of the 2013–14 season, Ronaldo extended his contract with Real Madrid by three years to 2018, with a net salary of €17 million, making him briefly the highest-paid player in football. Ronaldo, Gareth Bale, and Karim Benzema formed an attacking trio popularly dubbed "BBC", an acronym of Bale, Benzema and Cristiano. By late November, Ronaldo had scored hat-tricks against Galatasaray, Sevilla and Real Sociedad. (Note: Attributed to multiple references:) He finished 2013 with 69 goals for club and country, and won the 2013 FIFA Ballon d'Or.

Ronaldo experienced patellar tendinitis and related hamstring problems ahead of the 2014 UEFA Champions League final. He played in the match against medical advice, later commenting: "In your life you do not win without sacrifices and you must take risks". Madrid won the match, securing their tenth Champions League title. Ronaldo was the competition's top goalscorer for the third time—with a record 17 goals—and was named the UEFA Best Player in Europe. In the Copa del Rey, he helped Madrid reach the final by scoring from two penalty kicks against Atlético Madrid. Ongoing problems with his knee and thigh caused him to miss the final, where Madrid defeated Barcelona 2–1 to claim the trophy. During the La Liga season, Ronaldo scored 31 goals in 30 league games, which earned him the European Golden Shoe (shared with Luis Suárez of Liverpool) and the Pichichi Trophy. On 6 January, he scored his 400th career goal, in 653 appearances for club and country. He scored a back-heeled volley against Valencia on 4 May, which was named the best goal of the season by the Liga Nacional de Fútbol Profesional. The organisation also named Ronaldo the Best Player in La Liga.

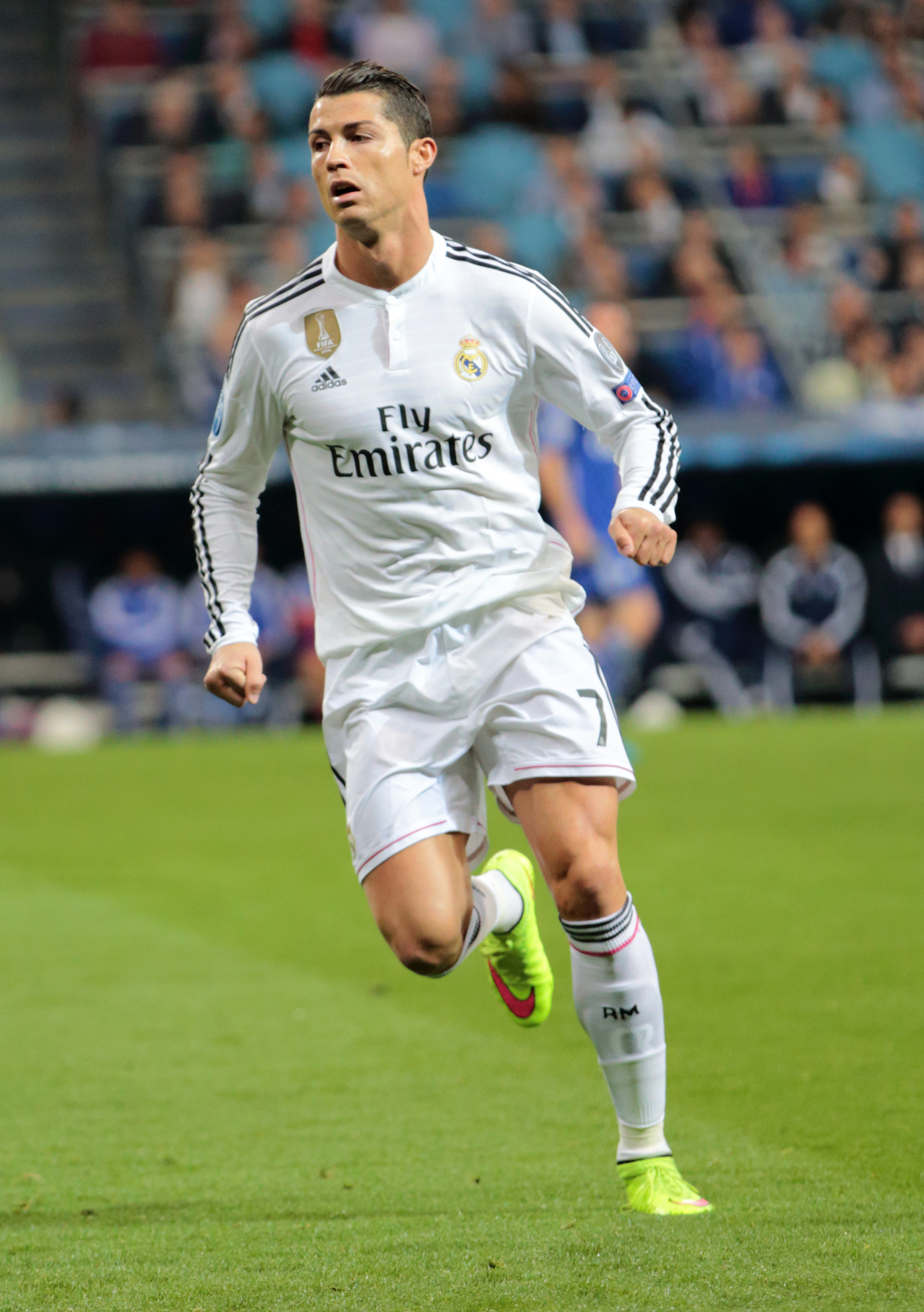
During the 2014–15 season, Ronaldo scored a personal best of 61 goals across all competitions.

During the 2014–15 season, Ronaldo set a new personal best of 61 goals, starting with both goals in Madrid's 2–0 win over Sevilla in the UEFA Super Cup in August 2014. On 6 December, he became the fastest player to reach 200 goals in La Liga after his record 23rd league hat-trick in his 178th match. After Madrid won the 2014 FIFA Club World Cup, Ronaldo received his third Ballon d'Or. With 10 goals in the Champions League, he finished as a joint top scorer in the competition for a third consecutive season, alongside Messi and Neymar. During a 9–1 victory over Granada on 5 April 2015, he scored five goals in one game for the first time in his career, including an eight-minute hat-trick. His 300th goal for his club followed three days later in a 2–0 win against Rayo Vallecano. Subsequent hat-tricks against Sevilla, Espanyol and Getafe took his number of hat-tricks for Madrid to 31, surpassing Alfredo Di Stéfano's club record of 28. Ronaldo finished the La Liga season with 48 goals, winning a second consecutive Pichichi Trophy and a record fourth European Golden Shoe.

==== 2015–2017: All-time Real Madrid top scorer and fifth Ballon d'Or ====
Near the start of the 2015–16 season, Ronaldo scored five goals in a 6–0 win over Espanyol, bringing his total goal tally in La Liga to 230 goals in 203 games. He became Madrid's all-time top scorer in La Liga, surpassing the record held by Raúl. Several days later, Ronaldo became the all-time top scorer in the Champions League with a hat-trick against Shakhtar Donetsk on September 16. Two goals against Malmö FF in a 2–0 win at the end of the month saw him reach 500 career goals for club and country. Ronaldo surpassed Raúl again on 17 October when he scored in a 3–0 win over Levante, which brought his total goals for Madrid across all competitions to a record 324. (Note: Real Madrid had previously recognised Ronaldo as their all-time top scorer after he scored two goals against Malmö FF on 30 September 2015. The club's official record book attributes to Ronaldo a 74th-minute goal in a 2–1 win over Real Sociedad on 18 September 2010, even though his free kick was deflected by Pepe.)

Ronaldo's four goals in a 7–1 win over Celta de Vigo on 5 March 2016 brought his total to 252 goals in La Liga, making him the league's second-highest all-time scorer behind Messi. In April, he scored a hat-trick in the Champions League quarter-finals, and in the final he scored during the penalty shoot-out as Madrid secured their 11th Champions League title. His 16 Champions League goals made him the event's top scorer for the fourth consecutive season. For the sixth year in a row, he finished the season with over 50 goals across all competitions. For his efforts during the season, he received the UEFA Best Player in Europe Award for a second time.

Ronaldo missed Madrid's first three matches of the 2016–17 season, including the 2016 UEFA Super Cup against Sevilla, as he continued to recover from a knee injury he suffered in the Euro 2016 final. On 15 September 2016, he did not celebrate his goal against Sporting CP in the Champions League, citing the club's vital role in his development as a player. In early November, Ronaldo's contract was updated for the second time and extended by three years to 2021. On 19 November, he scored a hat-trick in a 3–0 win against Atlético, making him the all-time top scorer in the Madrid derby with 18 goals. On 15 December, he scored his 500th career club goal during a 2–0 win over Club América in the semi-finals of the 2016 FIFA Club World Cup. He then scored a hat-trick in a 4–2 win over Kashima Antlers in the final. Ronaldo finished the Club World Cup as top scorer with four goals, and was named player of the tournament. He won his fourth Ballon d'Or in December and the inaugural Best FIFA Men's Player award in January 2017.

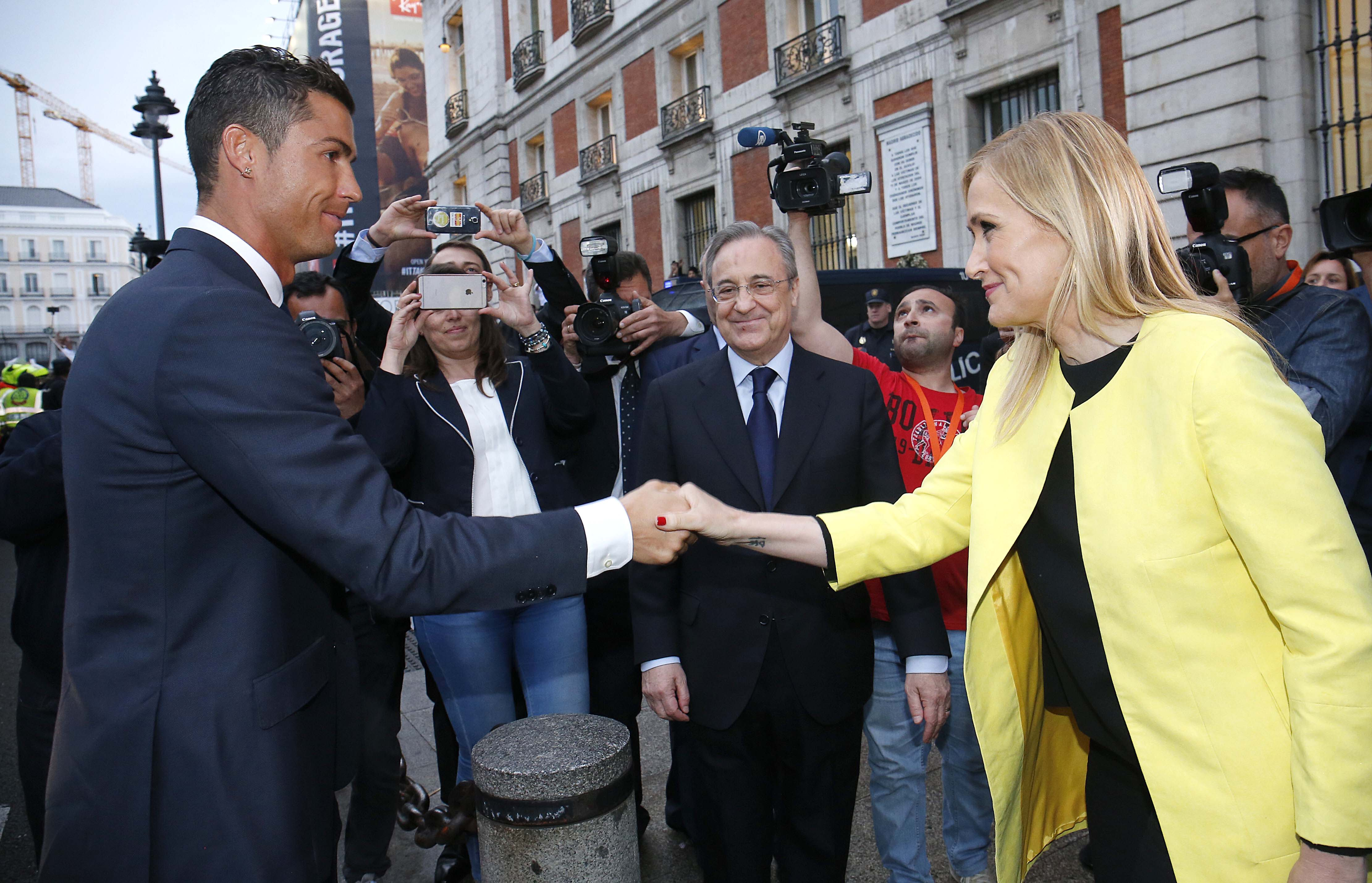
Ronaldo with Cristina Cifuentes, President of the Community of Madrid, during the 2016 Champions League victory celebrations in Madrid

During the first leg of the 2016–17 UEFA Champions League quarter-finals against Bayern Munich in April 2017, Ronaldo scored both goals in a 2–1 win, becoming the first player to reach 100 goals in UEFA club competition. In the second leg, Madrid defeated Bayern 4–2 as Ronaldo scored a hat-trick, becoming the first player to reach 100 Champions League goals. On 17 May, Ronaldo scored twice against Celta de Vigo and overtook Jimmy Greaves as the all-time top scorer in the top five European leagues. He finished the season with 42 goals in all competitions as he helped Madrid win the La Liga title. In the Champions League Final, Ronaldo scored two goals in a 4–1 victory over Juventus, making him the competition's top scorer for the fifth straight season, with 12 goals; the second goal was the 600th of his senior career. On 23 October, he was awarded The Best FIFA Men's Player award for the second consecutive year, and on 7 December he received his fifth Ballon d'Or.

==== 2017–2018: Fifth Champions League win ====
On 16 December 2017, Ronaldo scored a game-winning goal from a free kick in the FIFA Club World Cup final against Grêmio, which gave Madrid their second consecutive title. On 3 March 2018, he became the second player to reach 300 goals in La Liga after scoring twice in a 3–1 win over Getafe. On 18 March, he reached his 50th career hat-trick, scoring four goals in a 6–3 win against Girona.

Video
- Ronaldo's bicycle kick goal on YouTube

On 3 April, Ronaldo scored the first two goals in a 3–0 win against Juventus in the quarter-finals of the 2017–18 UEFA Champions League. His second goal was scored with a bicycle kick, with his foot approximately 7 ft 7 in (2.31 m) off the ground. It earned him a standing ovation from the opposing fans in the stadium and high praise from peers, pundits and coaches. Madrid defeated Liverpool 3–1 in the final on 26 May, with Ronaldo becoming the first player in history to win five Champions League titles. He finished as the top scorer of the tournament for the sixth consecutive season with 15 goals. After the final, Ronaldo referred to his time with Madrid in the past tense, sparking speculation that he could leave the club.

=== Juventus ===
In July 2018, after months of negotiations about a new Real Madrid contract, Ronaldo signed a four-year contract with the Italian club Juventus after completing a €100 million transfer, which included an additional €12 million in other fees and solidarity contributions to Ronaldo's youth clubs. The transfer was the highest ever for a player over 30 years old, and the highest ever paid by an Italian club. Ronaldo said his reason for departing Madrid was that he needed a new challenge, but he later attributed the transfer to feeling a lack of support from Madrid president Florentino Pérez.

==== 2018–2020: Consecutive Serie A titles ====
On 18 August, Ronaldo made his debut for Juventus in a 3–2 win against Chievo Verona. On 16 September, he scored his first two goals for the club during a 2–1 win over Sassuolo in Serie A. Three days later, in a Champions League match against Valencia, he was sent off in the 29th minute for violent conduct. In November, Ronaldo became the first player in history to win 100 Champions League matches, after assisting the game-winning goal in a 1–0 win over Valencia. In 2018, he placed second in the voting for the UEFA Men's Player of the Year, The Best FIFA Men's Player, and the Ballon d'Or. Ronaldo won his first trophy with Juventus on 16 January 2019, the 2018 Supercoppa Italiana, after he scored the only goal against AC Milan.

On 12 March, Ronaldo scored a hat-trick in a 3–0 win against Atlético in the second leg of the Champions League round of 16. The following month, he scored a goal in each leg of the quarter-finals as Juventus were eliminated from the competition. On 20 April, Ronaldo helped Juventus achieve a 2–1 victory over Fiorentina to win their eighth consecutive league title. A week later, he scored his 600th club goal during a 1–1 draw against Derby d'Italia rivals Inter Milan. Finishing his first Serie A campaign with 21 goals and 8 assists, Ronaldo won the inaugural Serie A award for Most Valuable Player.

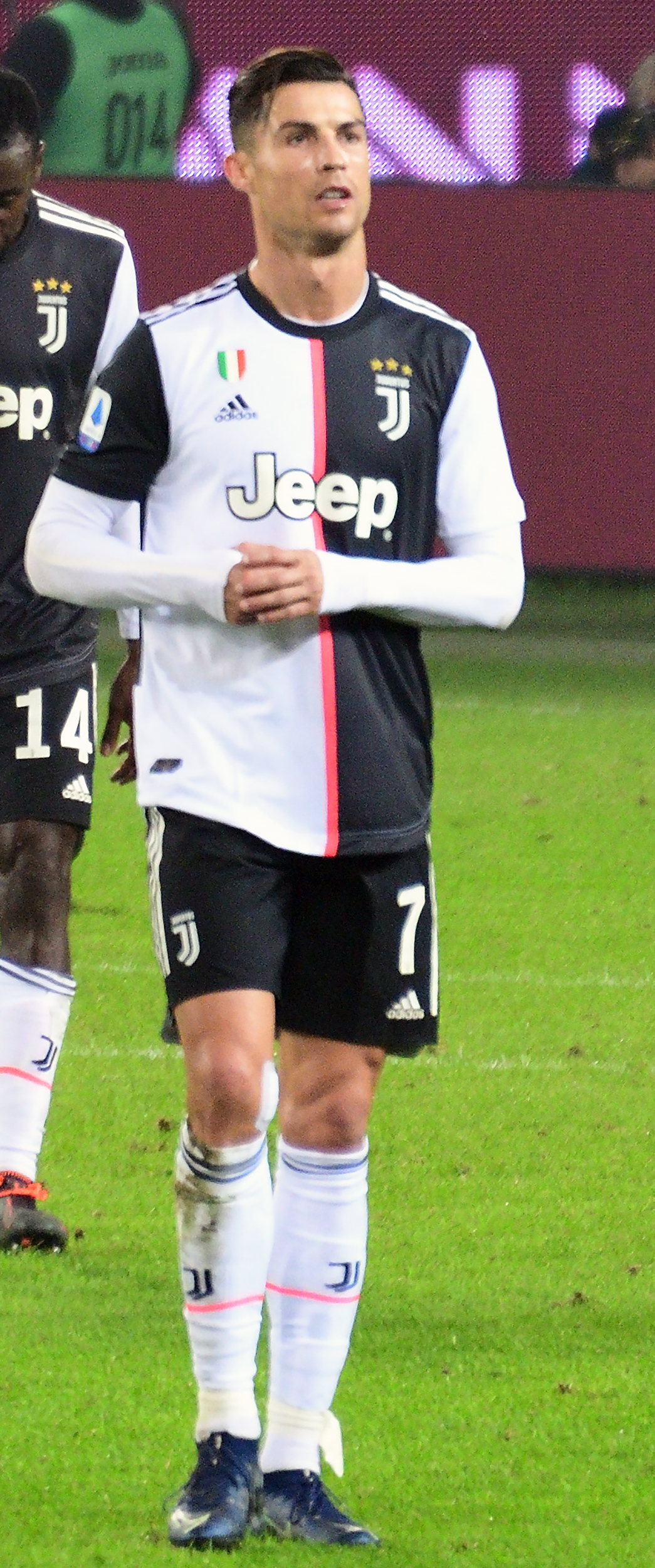
Ronaldo playing for Juventus against Torino in November 2019

In September 2019, Ronaldo came in 3rd place for the Best FIFA Men's Player Award. During Juventus' 3–0 Champions League win over Bayer Leverkusen on October 1, he broke Iker Casillas' record for most Champions League wins of all time, with 105. On 18 December, Ronaldo leapt to a height of 8 ft 5 in (2.57 m)—higher than the goal's crossbar—to head in the winning goal in a 2–1 victory over Sampdoria. He scored his first Serie A hat-trick on 6 January 2020, in a 4–0 win against Cagliari. On 8 February, he set a new Juventus record of scoring in ten consecutive league games during a 2–1 loss to Hellas Verona. On 22 February, he scored in his eleventh consecutive Serie A game as Juventus defeated SPAL 2–1, equalling the record held by Gabriel Batistuta and Fabio Quagliarella.

On 20 July 2020, Ronaldo scored twice in a 2–1 win over Lazio, becoming the second-fastest player to reach 50 goals in Serie A after Gunnar Nordahl. He also became the first player in history to reach 50 goals in each of the Premier League, La Liga and Serie A, and became the second player after Edin Džeko to score 50 goals in three of Europe's top five major leagues. On 26 July, Ronaldo scored once in a 2–0 win over Sampdoria as Juventus won the Serie A league title for a ninth consecutive time. Ronaldo finished the season with 37 goals in all competitions, surpassing Felice Borel's record of 36 goals in a single Juventus season.

==== 2020–2021: 100 Juventus goals, Capocannoniere, and departure ====
On 1 November 2020, Ronaldo returned to the pitch after recovering from COVID-19 for three weeks. The following month, he scored his 750th senior career goal against Dynamo Kyiv in a Champions League group stage match. On 20 January 2021, Juventus won the 2020 Supercoppa Italiana after a 2–0 win against Napoli, with Ronaldo scoring the opening goal. On 12 May, he scored a goal in a 3–1 win over Sassuolo in his 131st appearance for Juventus, becoming the fastest player in the club's history to reach 100 goals across all competitions. With Juventus' victory in the 2021 Coppa Italia Final on 19 May, Ronaldo became the first player to win every major domestic trophy in England, Spain and Italy. He finished the season with 29 league goals, winning the Capocannoniere award for highest goalscorer and becoming the first player to finish as the top scorer in the English, Spanish and Italian leagues.

=== Return to Manchester United ===
==== 2021–2022: 100 Premier League goals and departure ====
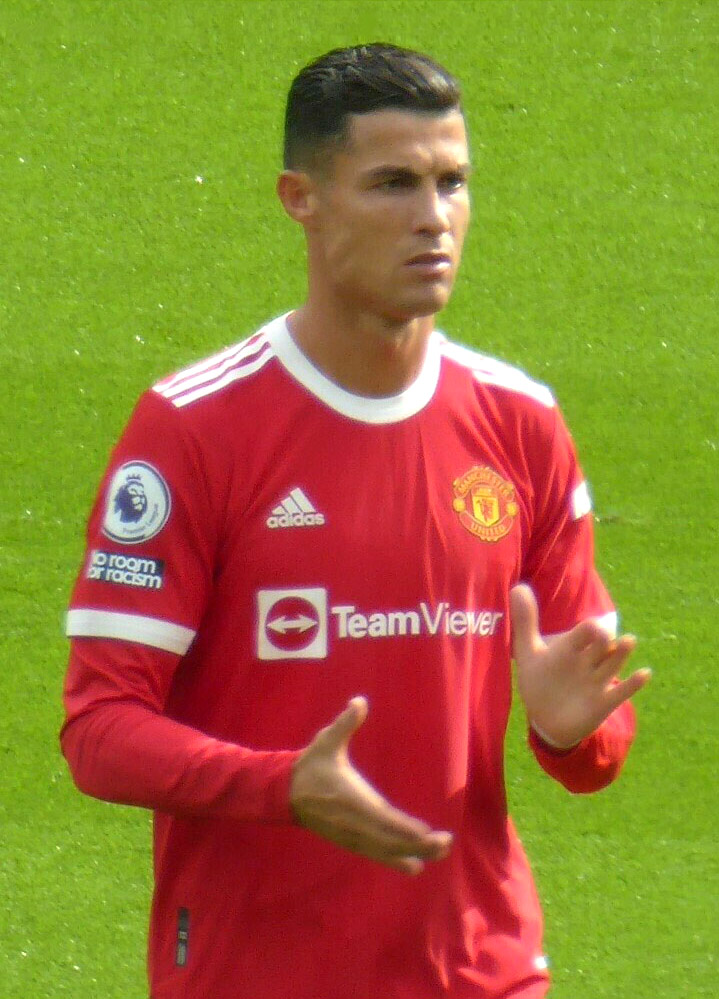
Ronaldo in a Premier League match against Newcastle in September 2021, his first game back at Manchester United

On 27 August 2021, Manchester United announced they had reached an agreement with Juventus to re-sign Ronaldo. The transfer was for an initial £12.85 million, with a two-year contract plus an optional year, and was confirmed on 31 August. Ronaldo was given the number 7 shirt after Edinson Cavani agreed to switch to 21. The first 24 hours of Ronaldo's shirt sales broke the all-time record for sales following a transfer, overtaking the sales of Messi's shirt after his transfer to Paris Saint-Germain. On 11 September, Ronaldo made his second debut for Manchester United, scoring the opening two goals in a 4–1 league victory against Newcastle United. On 29 September, he scored the winning goal in United's 2–1 victory over Villarreal in the Champions League, surpassing Iker Casillas for the most career appearances in the Champions League. On 2 December, Ronaldo scored two goals in a 3–2 win over Arsenal, which saw him surpass 800 career goals.

The following month Ronaldo's performance declined, and he went two months without scoring a goal, equalling his worst goalscoring run since 2010. He emerged from the drought on 15 February 2022, scoring once as United defeated Brighton & Hove Albion 2–0. After recovering from a hamstring injury, he scored a hat-trick in a 3–2 victory against Tottenham Hotspur, which saw him pass Josef Bican's record for total career goals scored in professional football, with 807. (Note: The Czech Football Association claims that Bican scored 821 career goals.) On 16 April, Ronaldo scored his 50th hat-trick at the club level in a 3–2 win over Norwich City. A week later, he scored his 100th Premier League goal in a 3–1 loss to Arsenal. After scoring in the following matches against Chelsea and Brentford, he was named the Premier League Player of the Month for April. He finished the season with 18 Premier League goals, making him the third-highest goalscorer in the league behind Mohamed Salah and Son Heung-min. He was named in the Premier League Team of the Year and received the Sir Matt Busby Player of the Year award, given to United's best player from the preceding season. Ronaldo failed to win a trophy for the first year since 2010.

Ronaldo's daughter was hospitalised, causing him to miss United's pre-season tour of Thailand and Australia amid reports that he wanted to transfer to a club competing in the Champions League. His agent, Jorge Mendes, began negotiating with various clubs for a free transfer or a loan, including Bayern Munich, Paris Saint-Germain and Chelsea. However, due to Ronaldo's age, the overall cost of a transfer and high wage demands, multiple European clubs declined the opportunity to sign him. Failing to secure a transfer, Ronaldo lost his place in the starting line-up to Marcus Rashford and Anthony Martial. He scored his first goal in the Europa League on 15 September 2022 during a 2–0 win against Sheriff Tiraspol. On 2 October, he was an unused substitute during United's 6–3 loss to Manchester City, and five days later he came on as a substitute and scored his 700th career goal at the club level in a 2–1 win against Everton. Ten days later, Ronaldo refused to be brought on as a substitute during a home game against Tottenham, and left the stadium before the match had finished. United manager Erik Ten Hag subsequently dropped Ronaldo from the squad for an upcoming match with Chelsea and made him train separately from the first team.

Following discussions with Ten Hag, Ronaldo started in United's win over Sheriff on 27 October, scoring the third goal in a 3–3 draw and ensuring United's qualification to the Europa League knockout stage. Ten Hag named Ronaldo as captain for a 3–1 loss to Aston Villa on 6 November, describing Ronaldo as an important member of the squad. Ronaldo missed United's following matches before the World Cup break, with Ten Hag saying that Ronaldo was ill. In a 14 November interview with Piers Morgan, Ronaldo said he felt betrayed by Ten Hag and senior executives who wanted him to leave the club. He said United did not support him when his daughter was ill, and claimed that Ten Hag deliberately provoked him by leaving him on the bench against City. Following the interview, Ronaldo's contract was terminated by mutual agreement with immediate effect.

=== Al-Nassr ===
On 30 December 2022, Ronaldo agreed to sign with the Saudi Pro League club Al-Nassr. His contract was set to begin on 1 January 2023 and run until 2025. The contract included an annual guaranteed salary of €90 million, and included commercial and sponsorship deals that brought his total annual salary to €200 million, the highest football salary in history. Ronaldo was also reportedly paid a signing bonus of roughly €100 million. (Note: Attributed to multiple references:) Before signing with Al-Nassr, Ronaldo had rejected a move to Major League Soccer club Sporting Kansas City.

==== 2023: Debut season and league runner-up ====
Ronaldo missed two January 2023 matches with Al-Nassr due to a suspension he received in April 2022 for knocking a phone out of the hand of a 14-year-old Everton fan. On 19 January, Ronaldo played in an exhibition game for a Riyadh XI team featuring players from Al Nassr and Al Hilal, against Paris Saint-Germain. Ronaldo scored twice in the 5–4 loss. He made his debut for Al-Nassr on 22 January as captain in a 1–0 win over Al-Ettifaq, and scored his first goal for the club in a 2–2 draw against Al-Fateh. On 9 February, Ronaldo scored all four goals in a 4–0 win over Al-Wehda, his first goal of the match being his 500th career league goal. On 25 February, he scored his second hat-trick for Al-Nassr during a 3–0 victory against Damac, becoming the first player in Saudi Pro League history to score a hat-trick in the first half of a match. Ronaldo was awarded the Player of the Month award for February after scoring eight goals and assisting twice. Al Nassr finished second in the league after the 2022–23 season.

==== 2023–2024: Arab Club Champions Cup winner and league top scorer ====
Ronaldo's signing for Al-Nassr resulted in players from other leagues—such as Karim Benzema, Sadio Mané, N'Golo Kanté, Rúben Neves, Riyad Mahrez and Neymar—transferring to the Saudi Pro League (SPL). On 3 August 2023, Ronaldo scored once against Zamalek to help Al-Nassr secure a 1–1 draw and qualify for the quarter-finals of the Arab Club Champions Cup. In the semi-finals on 9 August, he scored the only goal in a 1–0 victory over Al-Shorta, helping Al Nassr reach their first Arab Club Champions Cup final. Three days later, he scored both of Al-Nassr's goals as they defeated Al-Hilal 2–1 after extra time to win the tournament. Ronaldo scored a total of six goals in the competition, which earned him the top scorer award. At the end of August, he was named SPL Player of the Month after providing five goals and two assists in league matches.

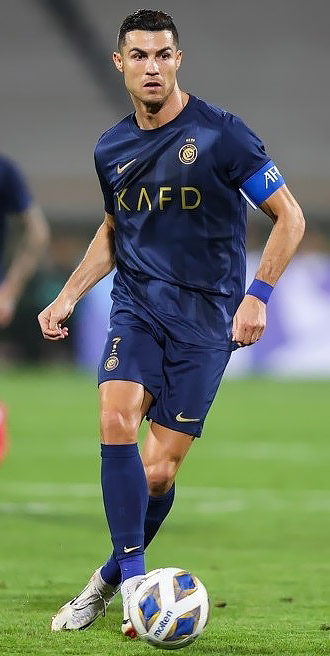
Ronaldo with Al-Nassr in an AFC Champions League match against Persepolis in September 2023

On 19 September, Ronaldo made his AFC Champions League debut in a 2–0 win over Persepolis, becoming the first player in history to record 1000 career games unbeaten (776 wins and 224 draws). He earned the SPL Player of the Month award for a second consecutive month after recording five goals and three assists in September. On 2 October, he scored his first AFC Champions League goal in a 3–1 win against Istiklol. On 8 December, Ronaldo made his 1200th senior career appearance for club and country, scoring once in a 4–1 win over Al-Riyadh. He finished the year with 54 goals across all competitions for Al-Nassr and Portugal, making him the world's top scorer in 2023. On 4 January 2024, Ronaldo was named SPL Player of the Month for the third time after recording five goals and two assists in December.

In the first knockout round of the AFC Champions League, Ronaldo scored the only goal in a 1–0 win over Al-Fayha. The game was his 1000th career match at the club level. On 25 February 2024, he allegedly made an obscene gesture towards opposing fans who jeered at him after Al-Nassr defeated Al-Shabab 3–2. As a result, he was suspended for one match by the Saudi Arabia Football Federation. On 11 March, he became the first player to achieve 800 career wins following a match against Al-Ain in the AFC Champions League quarter-finals. On 1 April, Ronaldo was named the SPL Player of the Month for the fourth time after scoring four goals in March. A week later, in the semi-finals of the Saudi Super Cup against Al-Hilal, he was sent off in the 86th minute for violent conduct. On 27 May, he scored his 35th league goal of the season, surpassing Abderrazak Hamdallah for the most goals scored in an SPL season. He also became the first footballer to finish as the top scorer in four different leagues during his career, having done so in the English, Spanish, Italian and Saudi leagues.

==== 2024–2025: Back-to-back league top scorer ====
Ronaldo started the 2024–25 season by scoring nine goals in 10 games across all competitions. On 5 October, he scored in a 3–0 league win over Al-Orobah, marking his 600th game with at least one goal. He surpassed Romário's record for the most career goals by a player 30 years or older, with 442. On 29 October, Al-Nassr were knocked out in the round of 16 of the King's Cup, after Ronaldo missed a penalty kick in the final minutes of the match against Al-Taawoun, resulting in a 1–0 loss. On 25 November, Ronaldo scored two goals against Al-Gharafa in a 3–1 Champions League Elite win, becoming the first player to score more than 40 goals in 13 different years, surpassing Lionel Messi's record of 12 years.

On 30 January 2025, Ronaldo became the first player to reach 700 club-level wins, while also scoring a goal in a 2–1 victory against Al Raed. On 28 February, he played his 100th match in all competitions for Al-Nassr, a 2–1 loss to Al-Orobah. On 26 May, he scored his 800th career club goal in a 3–2 loss to Al Fateh. Al-Nassr finished the season in third place, marking Ronaldo's fifth consecutive year without a league title. He finished the season with 25 league goals, becoming the league's top scorer for a second consecutive time. On 26 June, he extended his contract with Al Nassr until 2027.

==== 2025–2026: Saudi Pro League title and AFC Champions League Two final ====
On 23 August, Ronaldo scored his 100th goal for Al-Nassr, becoming the first player to score 100 goals for four different clubs. During a 4–1 victory over Al Khaleej on 24 November, he scored a bicycle kick goal which was later voted the 2025–26 Goal of the Season by fans. On 21 February 2026, he scored twice in a 4–0 victory over Al-Hazm, becoming the first player in history to score 500 career goals after turning 30 years old. A week later, he suffered a tear in his right hamstring, which kept him sidelined for a month. He returned on 3 April, scoring twice in a 5–2 win over Al-Najma and bringing Al-Nassr to the top of the league. On 7 May, he scored his 100th Saudi Pro League goal in a 4–2 win over Al-Shabab, becoming the first player to score against every other SPL team in a single season.

On 16 May, Al-Nassr were defeated in the Champions League Two final 1–0 by Gamba Osaka, which was Ronaldo's fourth loss in a tournament final since joining the club. Five days later, he scored two goals in a 4–1 victory over Damac to secure Al-Nassr's Saudi Pro League title, which was Ronaldo's first league title in five years. Ronaldo finished the season with 28 league goals, making him the third-highest goalscorer in the league behind Julián Quiñones and Ivan Toney.

==== 2026–2027 ====
Ronaldo began his 25th season as a professional footballer, scoring in a 4–0 away victory over Al-Riyadh on 21 August 2026. On 28 August, he scored in a 2–1 victory over Al-Taawoun, reaching 104 league goals and becoming Al-Nassr's all-time leading scorer in the Saudi Pro League since its rebranding in the 2008–09 season, surpassing the previous record held by Mohammad Al-Sahlawi.

== International career ==
=== 2001–2004: Youth career ===
Ronaldo began his international career in 2001 with Portugal's under-15 team. He made his debut on 24 February 2001 against South Africa in a friendly in Torres Novas, Portugal, and scored his first international goal. He also played for Portugal's under-17, under-20, under-21 and under-23 teams, making a total of 34 international youth appearances and scoring 18 goals.

=== 2003–2006: Beginnings with the national team ===
==== UEFA Euro 2004 ====
At age 18, Ronaldo made his first senior appearance for Portugal in a 1–0 win over Kazakhstan on 20 August 2003, coming on as a half-time substitute for Luís Figo. He was subsequently called up for UEFA Euro 2004 in Portugal, and scored his first senior international goal in a 2–1 group stage loss to Greece. After scoring his penalty kick in a shoot-out against England in the quarter-finals, he helped Portugal reach the final by scoring once in a 2–1 win over the Netherlands. He was featured in the team of the tournament, having provided two assists in addition to his two goals.

==== 2006 FIFA World Cup ====
Ronaldo was Portugal's second-highest scorer in their qualification group for the 2006 FIFA World Cup with seven goals. He scored his first World Cup goal against Iran from a penalty kick in Portugal's second match of the group stage. At the age of 21 years and 132 days, Ronaldo became the youngest ever World Cup goalscorer for Portugal. In the infamously violent round of 16 match against the Netherlands, Ronaldo left the pitch injured in the first half after a tackle from Dutch defender Khalid Boulahrouz. Following Portugal's 1–0 win, Ronaldo accused Boulahrouz of intentionally trying to injure him. In the quarter-final against England, Ronaldo's Manchester United teammate Wayne Rooney was sent off for stomping on Portugal defender Ricardo Carvalho. Some English media sources speculated that Ronaldo had influenced the referee's decision by complaining. (Note: Attributed to multiple references:) Ronaldo scored the winning penalty kick during the shoot-out against England; he was subsequently booed during Portugal's 1–0 semi-final defeat to France. FIFA gave the tournament's Best Young Player award to Germany's Lukas Podolski, and cited Ronaldo's behaviour as a factor in the decision.

=== 2007–2010: Assuming captaincy ===
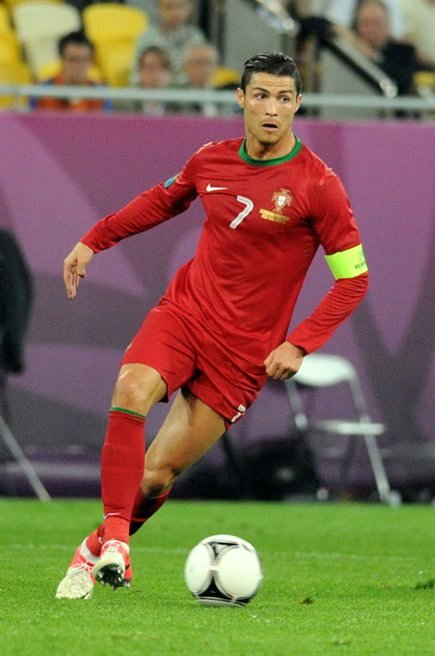
Ronaldo, pictured playing against Germany at Euro 2012, was made captain for Portugal in 2008.

One day after turning 22, Ronaldo captained Portugal for the first time in a friendly against Brazil on 6 February 2007. Portuguese Football Federation (FPF) president Carlos Silva, who had died two days earlier, had requested that Ronaldo be made captain.

==== UEFA Euro 2008 ====
Ahead of Euro 2008, Ronaldo was given the number 7 shirt. He scored eight goals during the qualifiers for the tournament. (Note: Attributed to multiple references:) During Portugal's 3–1 win over Czech Republic in the group stage of Euro 2008, Ronaldo scored once and served an assist, and was named man of the match. Portugal were eliminated in the quarter-finals by Germany.

==== 2010 FIFA World Cup ====
After Portugal's unsuccessful performance at Euro 2008, manager Luiz Felipe Scolari was replaced by Carlos Queiroz, the former assistant manager at Manchester United. Queiroz made Ronaldo the squad's permanent captain in July 2008. In the group stage of the 2010 World Cup, Ronaldo was named man of the match in all three of Portugal's matches. (Note: Attributed to multiple references:) His only goal of the tournament came during a 7–0 win over North Korea, which marked his first international goal in 16 months. Portugal's World Cup ended with a 1–0 loss against eventual champions Spain in the round of 16.

=== 2011–2014: Portugal's all-time top scorer ===
During a friendly against Argentina on 9 February 2011, Ronaldo played against Lionel Messi, his perceived career rival, in their first international match against one another. Ronaldo and Messi each scored a goal as Argentina defeated Portugal 2–1.

==== UEFA Euro 2012 ====
Ronaldo scored seven goals during the qualification for Euro 2012. In Portugal's Euro 2012 group stage match against the Netherlands, he scored twice to secure a 2–1 win. In the quarter-final against the Czech Republic, he scored from a header to give his team a 1–0 victory. Ronaldo was named man of the match for both games. After the semi-final against Spain ended scoreless, Portugal were eliminated in the penalty shoot-out. Ronaldo was included in the team of the tournament.

==== 2014 FIFA World Cup ====
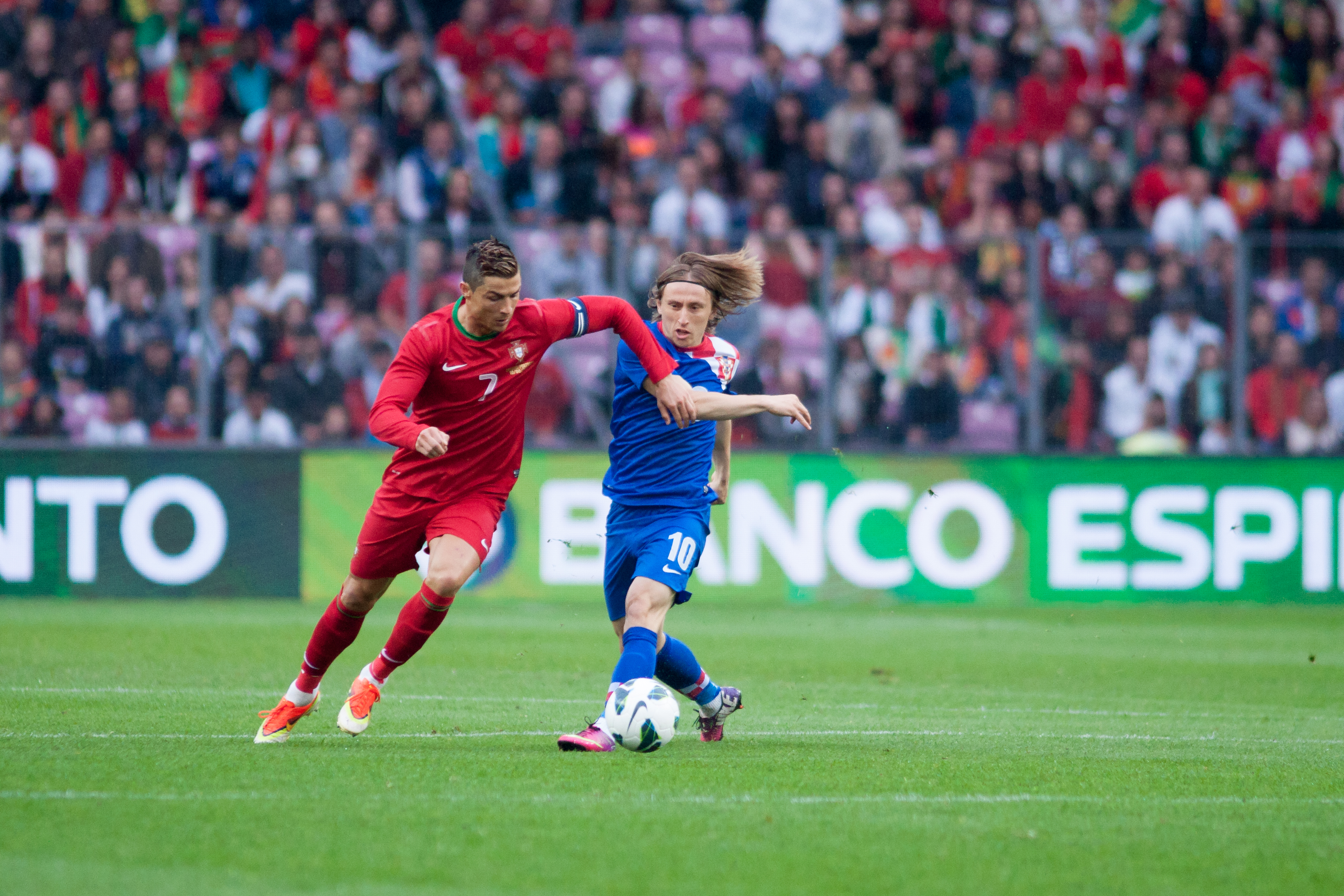
Ronaldo evading Luka Modrić during a friendly match against Croatia in 2013

During the qualification for the 2014 World Cup, Ronaldo scored a total of eight goals. Portugal's 1–1 draw against Northern Ireland on 17 October, 2012 was his 100th international appearance. His first international hat-trick also came against Northern Ireland, when he scored three times within 15 minutes during a 4–2 qualifying win on 6 September 2013. After Portugal failed to qualify during the regular campaign, Ronaldo scored all four of Portugal's goals in the play-offs against Sweden, which ensured their place at the World Cup. Ronaldo scored twice in a 5–1 friendly win over Cameroon on 5 March 2014 to become Portugal's all-time top scorer.

Ronaldo played in the World Cup despite suffering from patellar tendinitis and a related thigh injury, despite warnings from doctors that playing could end his career. He commented: "If we had two or three Cristiano Ronaldos on the team I would feel more comfortable. But we don't." Despite ongoing doubts over his fitness, and being forced to abort practice twice, Ronaldo played the full 90 minutes of the opening match against Germany, which saw Portugal lose 4–0. After assisting a stoppage-time equalising goal in a 2–2 draw against the United States, he scored a late match-winning goal in a 2–1 win over Ghana. The goal was his 50th international goal, making him the first Portuguese player to score in three World Cups. Portugal were eliminated from the tournament at the end of the group stage.

=== 2015–2017: European champion ===
==== UEFA Euro 2016 ====
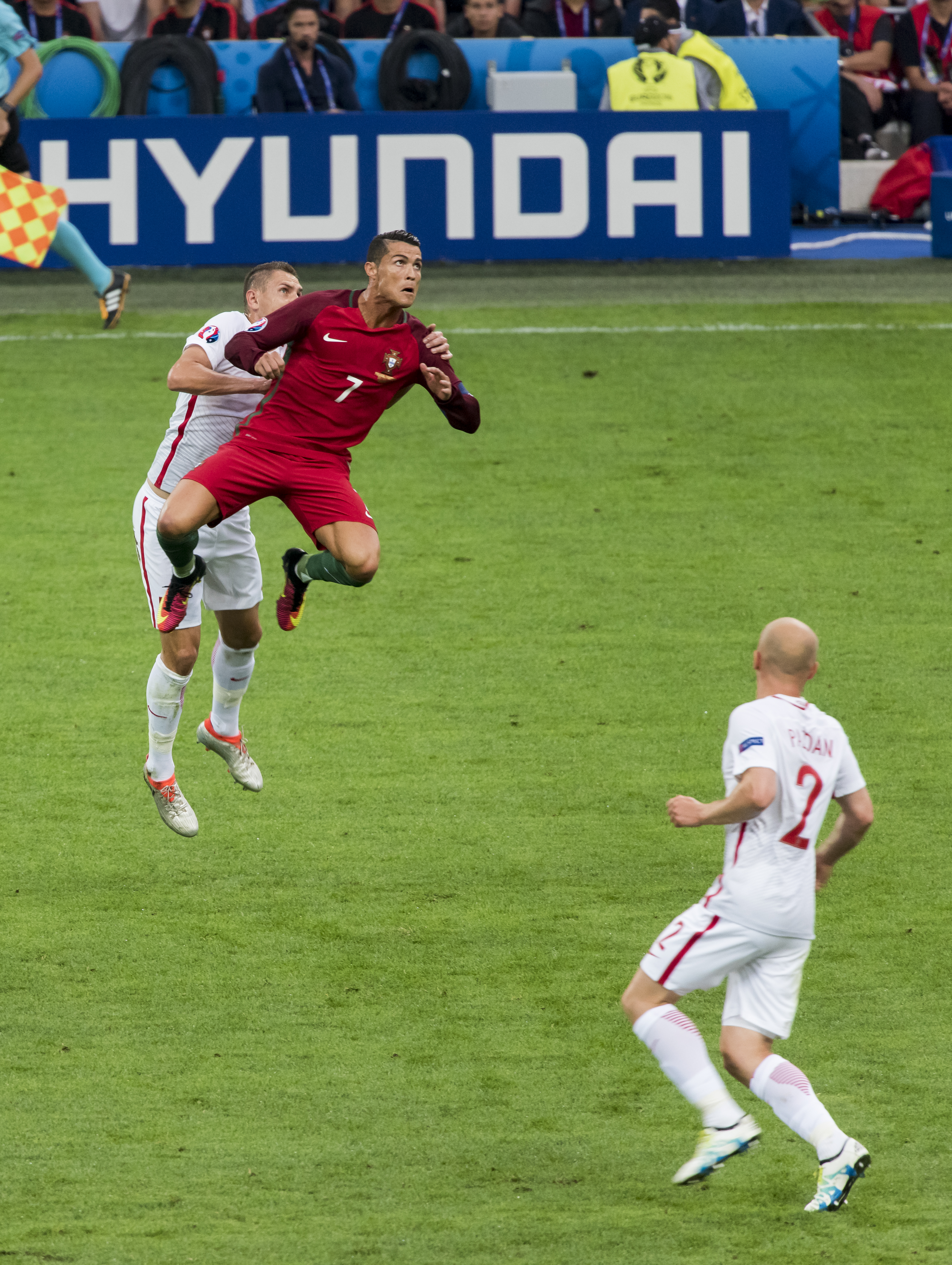
Ronaldo leaps in the air during Portugal's Euro 2016 quarter-final match against Poland.

Ronaldo scored five goals, including a hat-trick against Armenia, in the qualification for Euro 2016. With the only goal in another win over Armenia on 14 November 2014, he reached 23 career goals in Euro tournaments, including qualifying matches, to become the competition's all-time leading goal scorer. At the start of the tournament, Ronaldo failed to score during Portugal's draws against Iceland and Austria, despite taking 20 shots on goal. The match against Austria was his 128th international appearance, which saw him overtake Figo as Portugal's most capped player. With two goals in the last match of the group stage, a 3–3 draw against Hungary, Ronaldo became the first player to score in four Euros, having made a record 17 appearances in the tournament.

Portugal ultimately progressed to the final, where they faced France. Ronaldo left the pitch injured after 25 minutes following a tackle from Dimitri Payet. During extra time, Eder scored to earn Portugal a 1–0 win, the country's first victory in a major tournament. Ronaldo was awarded the Silver Boot as the joint second-highest goalscorer, with three goals and three assists, and was named to the team of the tournament for the third time in his career. Following Euro 2016, Ronaldo played his first professional match on his home island of Madeira on 28 March 2017, a 3–2 friendly loss to Sweden at the Estádio dos Barreiros.

==== 2017 FIFA Confederations Cup ====
In Portugal's opening match of the 2017 FIFA Confederations Cup against Mexico on 17 June, Ronaldo assisted Quaresma's opening goal in a 2–2 draw. Three days later, he scored in a 1–0 win over hosts Russia. On 24 June, he scored from a penalty in a 4–0 win over New Zealand, which saw Portugal top their group and advance to the semi-finals of the competition. He was named man of the match in all three of Portugal's group stage matches. After Portugal lost to Chile in a penalty shoot-out in the semi-finals, Ronaldo left the competition early to be with his newborn children, missing Portugal's 2–1 win over Mexico in the third-place play-off match.

=== 2018–2019: UEFA Nations League champion ===
==== 2018 FIFA World Cup ====
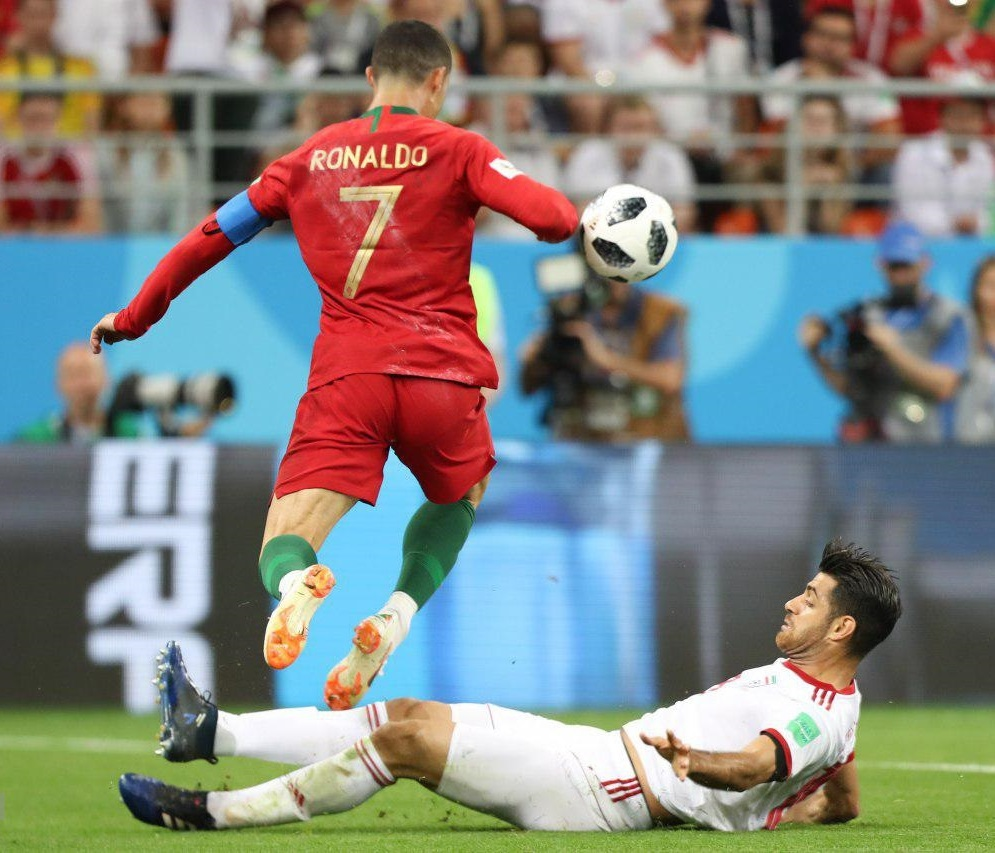
Ronaldo evades an Iran defender in the group stage of the 2018 World Cup.

On 31 August 2017, Ronaldo scored a hat-trick in a 5–1 win in a 2018 World Cup qualifying match over the Faroe Islands. These goals brought his tally in the qualifiers to 14, equalling Predrag Mijatović's record for most goals in a single UEFA qualifying campaign. Ronaldo also broke the record for the most goals scored in a European qualifying group, overtaking the previous record of 13 goals set by David Healy and Robert Lewandowski. The hat-trick took his career World Cup qualifying goals total to 29, making him the all-time highest scorer in UEFA qualifiers.

On 15 June 2018, Ronaldo became the oldest player to score a hat-trick in a FIFA World Cup match, helping Portugal secure a 3–3 draw against Spain in their opening match. He became one of four players to score a goal in four different World Cups, and the first Portuguese player to do so. On 20 June, Ronaldo scored the only goal in a 1–0 win against Morocco, surpassing Ferenc Puskás' to become the highest European goalscorer of all time, with 85 international goals. On 30 June, Portugal were eliminated following a 2–1 loss to Uruguay in the round of 16. For his performances in the tournament, Ronaldo was named to the World Cup Dream Team.

==== 2018–19 UEFA Nations League ====
After the World Cup, Ronaldo scored a hat-trick against Switzerland in the semi-finals of the inaugural Nations League Finals. He became the first player to score in 10 consecutive international competitions, breaking the record he previously shared with Ghana's Asamoah Gyan. Portugal defeated the Netherlands 1–0 in the final to win the tournament.

=== 2019–2022: Top international goalscorer ===
==== UEFA Euro 2020 ====
On 10 September 2019, Ronaldo scored four goals in a 5–1 win over Lithuania in a Euro 2020 qualifying match, surpassing Robbie Keane to become the player with the most career goals in Euro qualifying matches, with 25 goals. He also became the first player to score against 40 different national teams. On 14 October, he scored his 700th senior career goal for club and country in a 2–1 loss to Ukraine in another qualifier. On 13 October, Ronaldo tested positive for COVID-19 while being asymptomatic; he recovered by the end of the month.

On 15 June 2021, Ronaldo scored twice in Portugal's first game of Euro 2020, a 3–0 win against Hungary. He became the all-time top goalscorer in the competition's history, with 11 goals. He also became the first player to score at five Euros and in eleven consecutive tournaments. The two goals made Ronaldo the oldest player to score for Portugal at a major tournament. Portugal were eliminated following a 1–0 loss to Belgium in the round of 16. Ronaldo finished the tournament with five goals (tied with Patrik Schick) and one assist, earning him the Golden Boot.

==== 2022 FIFA World Cup ====
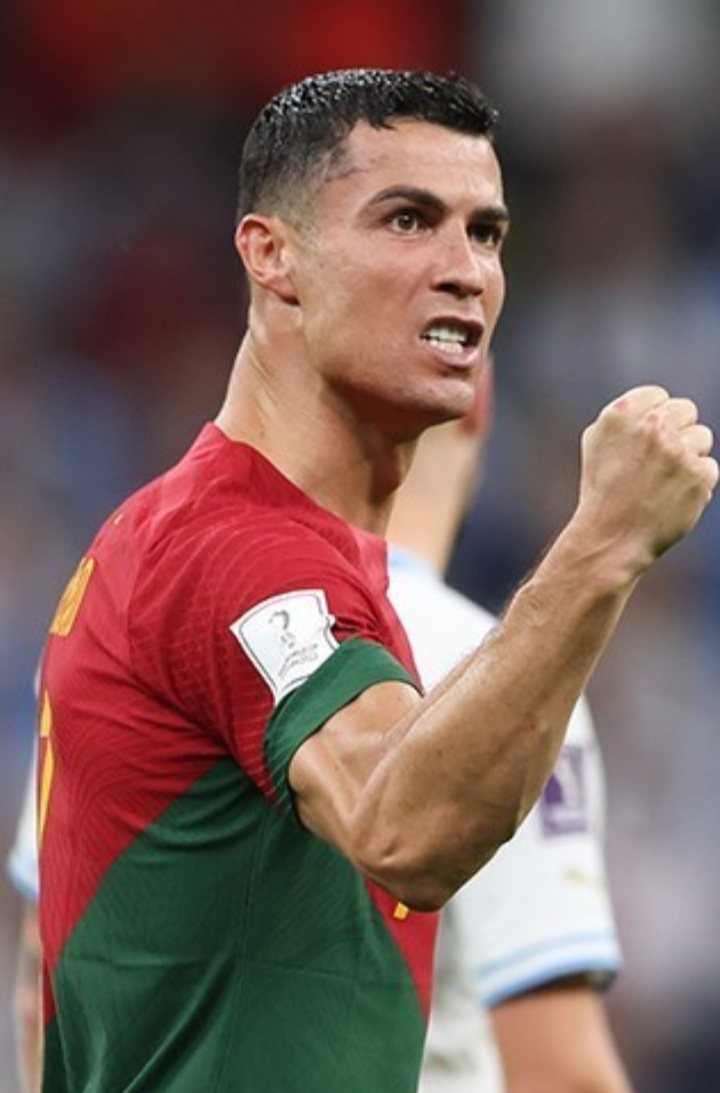
Ronaldo during a group stage game against Uruguay at the 2022 World Cup

On 1 September 2021, Ronaldo scored twice in a 2–1 win against the Republic of Ireland in a 2022 World Cup qualifier, and received a Guinness World Records certificate for setting the men's international scoring record, with 111 career international goals. Years later, it was reported that in 2021 FIFA had revised Ali Daei's career total of international goals from 109 to 108, which meant Ronaldo had set the record several months earlier at Euro 2020. (Note: As of 2021, FIFA no longer recognizes Iran's match against Ecuador's Olympic team on 12 January 2000 as official, therefore costing Daei one goal.) On 9 October, he made his 181st international appearance, surpassing Sergio Ramos' record for the most international caps received by a European player. On 12 October, Ronaldo scored a hat-trick in a 5–0 win over Luxembourg, becoming the first player to score 10 hat-tricks in men's international football.

Ronaldo was named in Portugal's squad for the 2022 FIFA World Cup in Qatar, his fifth World Cup. On 24 November, in Portugal's opening match against Ghana, Ronaldo scored from a penalty kick to become the first male player to score in five different World Cups. In the last group game against South Korea, Ronaldo received criticism from his coach for his reaction to being substituted. He was dropped from the starting line-up for Portugal's round of 16 match against Switzerland, which was the first time since Euro 2008 that he had not started a game for Portugal in a major international tournament. Portugal were eliminated from the World Cup after a 1–0 loss to Morocco in the quarter-finals.

=== 2023–2026: Second Nations League title and final years ===
==== UEFA Euro 2024 ====
Following the World Cup, rumours circulated that new Portugal manager Roberto Martínez might omit Ronaldo from the national team. However, Ronaldo was named in Portugal's squad for the UEFA Euro 2024 qualifiers against Liechtenstein and Luxembourg. On 23 March, Ronaldo scored two goals in a 4–0 win over Liechtenstein; with his 197th international appearance, he surpassed Bader Al-Mutawa to become the most-capped male footballer of all time. On 20 June, he made his 200th appearance for Portugal, scoring the only goal of a 1–0 win over Iceland in another qualifier. On 13 October, Ronaldo scored two goals in a 3–2 win over Slovakia to qualify Portugal for Euro 2024, which was Portugal's fastest qualification for a major tournament in history. On 16 October, Portugal secured first place in their group, following a 5–0 victory over Bosnia and Herzegovina. Ronaldo's two goals in the match meant he had scored more than 100 goals in each of the last three decades (2000s, 2010s, 2020s). (Note: Attributed to multiple references:)

On 21 May 2024, Ronaldo was selected for the 26-man squad for Euro 2024. In the opening match against the Czech Republic, he became the first player to appear at six editions of the Euro. At the age of 39, he became the second oldest outfield player to compete in the tournament's history, behind his teammate Pepe. On 22 June, Ronaldo assisted Portugal's third goal in a 3–0 win against Turkey, becoming the oldest player to assist a goal in the competition. On 26 June, he started in Portugal's final group stage match against Georgia, becoming the first European player to make 50 appearances at major international tournaments. Ronaldo finished the game scoreless, marking the first time he finished a group stage of an international tournament without a goal. Portugal were eliminated from the tournament in the quarterfinals by France, on 5 July.

==== 2024–25 UEFA Nations League ====
Ronaldo became the first player to reach 900 career goals in a 2–1 victory over Croatia in the UEFA Nations League on 5 September 2024. On 15 November, he scored two goals and achieved his 132nd international victory as Portugal defeated Poland 5–1 in a Nations League match, surpassing Sergio Ramos' international victories record. In the second leg of the quarter-finals against Denmark on 23 March 2025, Ronaldo scored in a 5–2 victory, becoming the fourth player 40 years or older to score with their national team, after Stanley Matthews, Roger Milla, and Paolo Guerrero. On 4 June, Ronaldo scored the winning goal in a 2–1 victory over Germany in the semi-finals, securing Portugal's qualification to the Nations League final. In the final against Spain, he scored the equalising goal in a 2–2 draw that pushed the match into extra time, eventually leading to a victory in a penalty shoot-out. At age 40, he became the oldest player to score in a major international final, breaking the previous record set by Pierre Kalala Mukendi. Ronaldo finished the tournament with a total of 8 goals.

==== 2026 FIFA World Cup ====
On 14 October 2025, Ronaldo scored twice in a 2–2 draw against Hungary during qualification for the 2026 World Cup. He became the first player to score 40 career goals in World Cup qualifiers, surpassing the previous record of 39 set by Carlos Ruiz. On 13 November, he received the first straight red card of his international career for elbowing Dara O'Shea of the Republic of Ireland during a 2–0 loss. FIFA issued Ronaldo a three-month ban and one year of probation for his conduct, but cancelled the ban on 5 December, ensuring his availability for the World Cup. (Note: Attributed to multiple references:)

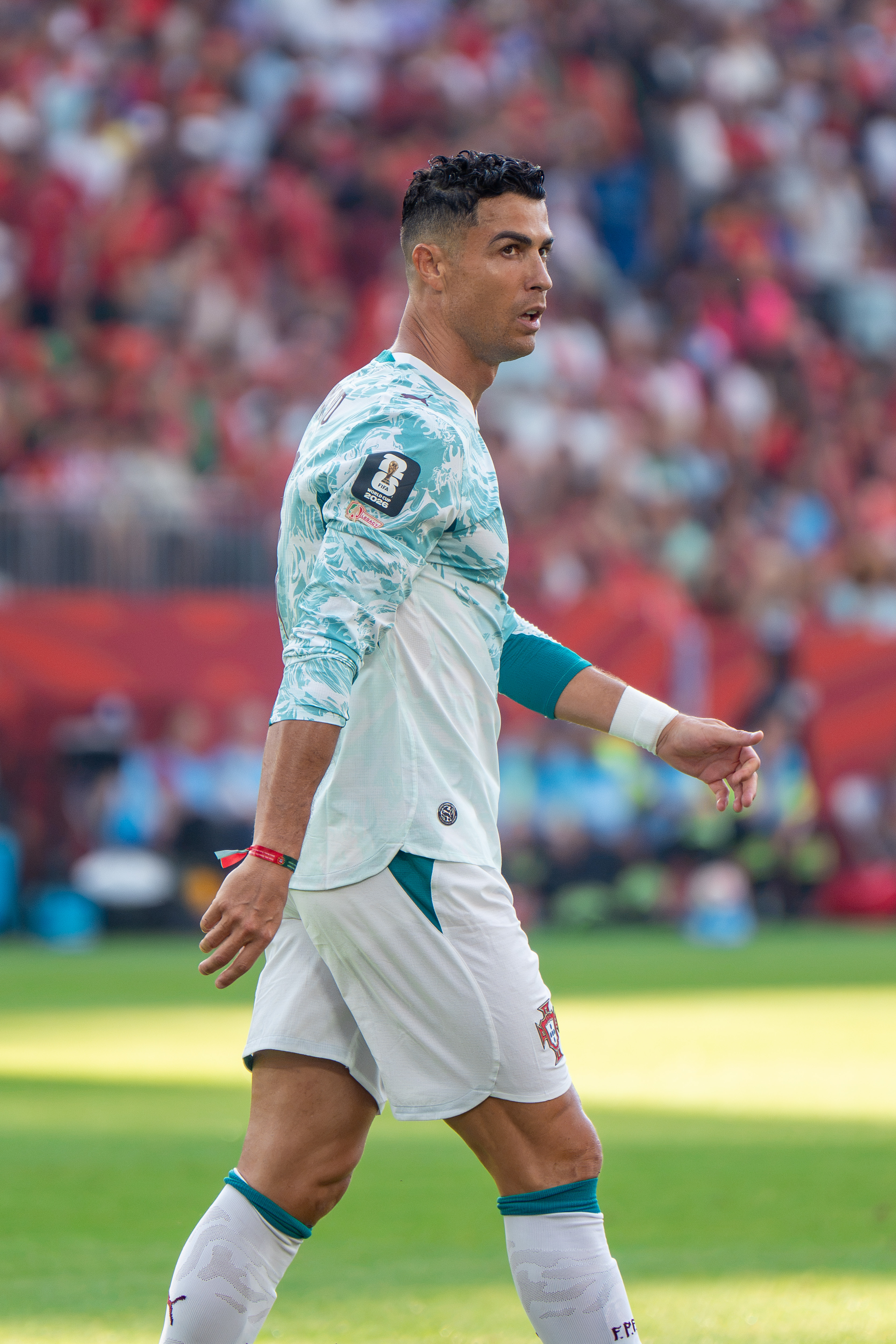
Ronaldo during a round of 32 game against Croatia at the 2026 World Cup

On 19 May 2026, Ronaldo was named in Portugal's squad for the 2026 FIFA World Cup, becoming the first player to be selected for six editions of the tournament. In Portugal's opening match, a 1–1 draw against the Democratic Republic of Congo, he became the oldest Portuguese player to appear at a World Cup at the age of 41 years and 132 days, surpassing the previous record held by Pepe. On 23 June, he scored two goals and was named man of the match in a 5–0 victory over Uzbekistan, becoming the first player to score in six World Cup tournaments and bringing his career World Cup goal tally to 10, surpassing Portugal's previous record of nine goals set by Eusébio. He also became the second-oldest World Cup goalscorer in history, behind Roger Milla. On 2 July, in a 2–1 victory over Croatia in the round of 32, Ronaldo's goal from a penalty kick was his first-ever goal in a World Cup knockout stage and ultimately his final international goal, and made him the oldest player to score in a World Cup knockout stage; he was named man of the match. Portugal were eliminated in the round of 16 after a 1–0 defeat to Spain. The match was Ronaldo's 27th career World Cup match, the second-most in tournament history behind Lionel Messi.

==== Final appearance and retirement ====
Following Portugal's elimination from the 2026 FIFA World Cup, Ronaldo considered retiring from international football, but was persuaded to continue by Portuguese Football Federation (FPF) president Pedro Proença. Newly appointed Portugal manager Jorge Jesus, who had previously coached Ronaldo at Al Nassr, expressed his support for him, while emphasizing his authority over team selection. Ronaldo was called up to play in the 2026–27 UEFA Nations League, and started Portugal's first game against Wales. In his final international match, Ronaldo scored a goal that was ruled offside, before being replaced in the 67th minute.

Tensions emerged after Ronaldo was left on the bench in the next game during a 2–1 victory over Norway on 27 September, despite allegedly being promised playing time. On 30 September, Ronaldo left Portugal's training camp ahead of their match against Denmark. Following the match on 4 October, Jesus described the dispute as a misunderstanding that could easily be resolved and expressed his willingness to welcome Ronaldo back. Two days later, Ronaldo publicly accused Jesus of twice breaking his word, first regarding Ronaldo's playing time and secondly over an agreement to clarify the incident publicly. Ronaldo apologised for leaving the training camp and stated that his actions warranted punishment, while also confirming his desire to play for Portugal. On 19 October, the FPF Disciplinary Council announced that Ronaldo would be fined and suspended for 30 days. Later on 5 November, Ronaldo announced his retirement from national team.
