= Alberto Rio =

Portuguese footballer

Personal information
- Date of birth: 21 August 1894
- Place of birth: Portugal
- Date of death: unknown
- Position: Forward

Senior career*
Years	Team	Apps	(Gls)
1921–1924	Belenenses		

International career
1922–1923	Portugal	2	(0)
- * Club domestic league appearances and goals

Alberto Rio (21 August 1894 – ?) was a Portuguese footballer who played as forward.

== Football career ==
Rio gained 2 caps for Portugal and made his debut 17 December 1922 in Lisbon against Spain, in a 1-2 defeat.
