= Vítor Gonçalves (footballer, born 1896) =

Portuguese footballer and manager

Personal information
- Full name: Vítor Cândido Gonçalves
- Date of birth: 12 April 1886
- Place of birth: Portugal
- Date of death: 1965 (aged 78–79)
- Height: 1.76 m (5 ft 9 in)
- Position: Midfielder

Senior career*
| Years | Team | Apps | (Gls) |
| 1918–1927 | Benfica | 72 | (5) |

International career
| 1921–1922 | Portugal | 2 | (0) |

Managerial career
- 1934–1936: Benfica
- * Club domestic league appearances and goals

Vítor Cândido Gonçalves (12 April 1896 – 1965) was a Portuguese footballer who played as a midfielder. A Portuguese international, he both played for and managed S.L. Benfica.

== Career ==
A forward in his early career, Gonçalves established himself as a midfielder soon after, playing alongside Cândido de Oliveira and António Ribeiro dos Reis. A Casa Pia student like many other Benfica players at the time, he gained more recognition after Cândido de Oliveira left the club in 1920 to start a new one, Casa Pia A.C.

Gonçalves first represented Portugal on 18 December 1921, in Madrid, against Spain, in a 3–1 loss, and then again in Lisbon, against the same opponent, in a 2–1 loss. In the latter match, he led the captain armband.

He coached Benfica from 1934 to 1936, winning the Campeonato de Portugal in his first season and the championship in the second one.

== Personal life ==
His son, Vasco Gonçalves, was an army officer in the Engineering Corps who took part in the Carnation Revolution and later served as the 104th Prime Minister of Portugal.

== Honours ==
=== Playing honours ===
Benfica

- Campeonato de Lisboa: 1919–20
- Taça de Honra (2)

=== Managerial honours ===
Benfica

- Primeira Liga: 1935–36
- Campeonato de Portugal: 1934–35
