= Carlos Coelho (footballer) =

Portuguese footballer

Personal information
- Full name: Carlos João Pinho Coelho
- Date of birth: 10 April 1953 (age 73)
- Place of birth: Lisbon, Portugal
- Position: Defender

Senior career*
| Years | Team | Apps | (Gls) |
| 1972–1977 | Atlético | | |
| 1977–1981 | Espinho | | |
| 1981–1984 | Portimonense | 81 | (0) |

International career
| 1982–1983 | Portugal | 3 | (0) |
- * Club domestic league appearances and goals

Carlos João Pinho Coelho (born 10 April 1953 in Lisbon) is a former Portuguese footballer who played as a defender.
