= European association football club records and statistics =

This article details men's professional football club records and statistics (individual and collective) in Europe.

The records and stats look across all European clubs competing in the highest divisions and levels of European professional football, allowing for cross-competition comparison. Therefore, the coverage only considers for domestic competitions the top-division of the national league and its cups (national cup, league cup, super cup); for continental competitions, all UEFA club competitions including – although recognized but not organized by UEFA – the Fairs Cup as the predecessor to the UEFA Cup; and additionally, on an intercontinental scale, both the FIFA Club World Cup and its defunct predecessor, the Intercontinental Cup, which was endorsed by UEFA (Europe) and CONMEBOL (South America).

== All competitions for men's European football clubs ==
Infobox of all club competitions (excluding regional and pre-season friendly / invitational tournaments)

National club competitions				Intercontinental / worldwide club competitions		
League	National Cup	League Cup	Super Cup	Intercontinental Cup (1960–2004)	FIFA Club World Cup (2000–)	FIFA Intercontinental Cup (2024–)
				UEFA club competition	FIFA club competition	

European club competitions
European Cup / Champions League (1955–1992 / 1992–)	Fairs Cup (1955–1971)	UEFA Cup / Europa League (1971–2009 / 2009–)	Cup Winners' Cup (1960–1999)	Conference League (2021–)	UEFA Super Cup (1973–)	UEFA Intertoto Cup (1995–2008)
UEFA club competition		UEFA club competition				

== Individual records ==
=== Most goals in a season in all club competitions ===
Only the period starting from the implementation of the modern offside rule in 1925 is considered for this list. Under the revised offside rule introduced in 1925, a player would be deemed offside unless there were two opposing players (including the goalkeeper) positioned ahead of them.

Abbreviations
NL	≙	National League
NC	≙	National Cup
LC	≙	League Cup
SC	≙	Super Cup
UCL	≙	European Cup / UEFA Champions League
UEL	≙	UEFA Cup / UEFA Europa League
UCWC	≙	UEFA Cup Winners' Cup
UECL	≙	UEFA Conference League
USC	≙	UEFA Super Cup
FC	≙	Fairs Cup
IC	≙	Intercontinental Cup
FCWC	≙	FIFA Club World Cup

Key
	Number of goals scored in a national club competition
	Number of goals scored in a European club competition
	Number of goals scored in an intercontinental / worldwide club competition
‡	Player won the European Golden Shoe
GM	Player won the Gerd Müller Trophy
Red	Number of goals with which the European Golden Shoe was won
Player (X)	Denotes the number of times the player had scored 50 or more goals in a season at that time

- The list refers to goals in all national club competitions (top division), all European club competitions organized by UEFA (including all UEFA preliminary and qualifying rounds) and the Inter-Cities Fairs Cup as the predecessor in the UEFA Cup and all intercontinental / worldwide club competitions (excluding the International Champions Cup)
- Does not include goals scored in the Intertoto Cup (1961–1994), in regional competitions, in pre-season friendly / invitational tournaments and international goals in the national team

List of most goals in a season in all club competitions (50 or more goals)
Rank	Player	Nationality	Goals	Itemized Goals	Club	Season	Reference
1	Lionel Messi^{‡} (2)	Argentina	73	(50) NL, (3) NC, (3) SC (14) UCL, (1) USC (2) FCWC	(Spain) Barcelona	2011–12	
2	Ferenc Deák	Hungary	66	(66) NL	(Hungary) Szentlőrinci	1945–46	
2	Gerd Müller (2)	Germany	66	(36) NL, (7) NC, (12) LC (11) UCL	(Germany) Bayern Munich	1972–73	
4	Dixie Dean	England	63	(60) NL, (3) NC	(England) Everton	1927–28	
5	Fred Roberts	Northern Ireland	61 (Note: Roberts also scored 35 goals in regional and local cups, which included, would make the tally 96 goals that season.)	(55) NL, (6) NC	(Northern Ireland) Glentoran	1930–31	
5	Cristiano Ronaldo^{‡} (5)	Portugal	61	(48) NL, (1) NC (10) UCL, (2) USC	(Spain) Real Madrid	2014–15	
5	Harry Kane^{‡ GM}	England	61	(36) NL, (10) NC, (1) SC (14) UCL	(Germany) Bayern Munich	2025–26	
8	Willie MacFadyen (2)	Scotland	60	(45) NL, (15) NC	(Scotland) Motherwell	1932–33	
8	Josef Bican (3)	Czech Republic	60 (Note: Josef Bican also scored 16 goals in the 1943–44 Středočeský Pohár, a regional cup competition in the Central Bohemian Region. Including the regional cup competition, Bican scored 76 goals in the 1943–44 season.)	(57) NL, (3) NC	(Czech Republic) Slavia Prague	1943–44	
8	Cristiano Ronaldo (2)	Portugal	60	(46) NL, (3) NC, (1) SC (10) UCL	(Spain) Real Madrid	2011–12	
8	Lionel Messi^{‡} (3)	Argentina	60	(46) NL, (4) NC, (2) SC (8) UCL	(Spain) Barcelona	2012–13	
12	Ferenc Deák (2)	Hungary	59	(59) NL	(Hungary) Ferencváros	1948–49	
12	Refik Resmja	Albania	59	(59) NL	(Albania) Partizani Tirana	1950–51	
12	Luis Suárez^{‡}	Uruguay	59	(40) NL, (5) NC (8) UCL, (1) USC (5) FCWC	(Spain) Barcelona	2015–16	
15	Jimmy McGrory	Scotland	58 (Note: McGrory also scored 2 goals in Glasgow Cup, which included, would make the tally 60 goals that season.)	(49) NL, (9) NC	(Scotland) Celtic	1926–27	
15	Lionel Messi (4)	Argentina	58	(43) NL, (5) NC (10) UCL	(Spain) Barcelona	2014–15	
17	Joe Bambrick	Northern Ireland	57 (Note: Bambrick also scored 26 goals in regional and local cups, which included, would make the tally 83 goals that season.)	(50) NL, (7) NC	(Northern Ireland) Linfield	1929–30	
18	Gyula Zsengellér	Hungary	56 (Note: Zsengellér also scored 9 goals in 1939 Mitropa Cup, which included, would make the tally 65 goals that season.)	(56) NL	(Hungary) Újpest	1938–39	
18	Ladislau Bonyhádi	Romania	56	(49) NL, (7) NC	(Romania) UTA Arad	1947–48	
20	Josef Bican (1)	Czech Republic	55 (Note: Josef Bican also scored one goal in the 1939–40 Středočeský Pohár, a regional cup competition in the Central Bohemian Region. Including the regional cup competition, Bican scored 56 goals in the 1939–40 season.)	(50) NL, (5) NC	(Czech Republic) Slavia Prague	1939–40	
20	Josef Bican (2)	Czech Republic	55 (Note: Josef Bican also scored 8 goals in the 1941–42 Středočeský Pohár, a regional cup competition in the Central Bohemian Region. Including the regional cup competition, Bican scored 63 goals in the 1941–42 season.)	(45) NL, (10) NC	(Czech Republic) Slavia Prague	1941–42	
20	Henk Groot	Netherlands	55	(41) NL, (14) NC	(Netherlands) Ajax	1960–61	
20	Mário Jardel (1)	Brazil	55	(37) NL, (6) NC, (2) SC (10) UCL	(Portugal) Porto	1999–2000	
20	Mário Jardel^{‡} (2)	Brazil	55	(42) NL, (7) NC (6) UEL	(Portugal) Sporting CP	2001–02	
20	Cristiano Ronaldo (3)	Portugal	55	(34) NL, (7) NC, (2) SC (12) UCL	(Spain) Real Madrid	2012–13	
20	Robert Lewandowski	Poland	55	(34) NL, (6) NC (15) UCL	(Germany) Bayern Munich	2019–20	
27	Willie MacFadyen	Scotland	54	(52) NL, (2) NC	(Scotland) Motherwell	1931–32	
27	Lionel Messi^{‡} (5)	Argentina	54	(37) NL, (5) NC, (1) SC (11) UCL	(Spain) Barcelona	2016–17	
27	Viktor Gyökeres^{GM}	Sweden	54	(39) NL, (5) NC, (4) LC (6) UCL	(Portugal) Sporting CP	2024–25	
30	Jimmy McGrory (2)	Scotland	53 (Note: McGrory also scored 9 goals in Glasgow Cup, which included, would make the tally 62 goals that season.)	(47) NL, (6) NC	(Scotland) Celtic	1927–28	
30	Henrik Larsson^{‡}	Sweden	53 (Note: Includes Henrik Larsson's one goal in the first qualifying round of the 2000–01 UEFA Cup.)	(35) NL, (9) NC, (5) LC (4) UEL	(Scotland) Celtic	2000–01	
30	Cristiano Ronaldo^{‡}	Portugal	53	(40) NL, (7) NC (6) UCL	(Spain) Real Madrid	2010–11	
30	Lionel Messi	Argentina	53	(31) NL, (7) NC, (3) SC (12) UCL	(Spain) Barcelona	2010–11	
34	Erling Haaland^{‡ GM}	Norway	52	(36) NL, (3) NC, (1) LC (12) UCL	(England) Manchester City	2022–23	
35	Gyula Zsengellér (2)	Hungary	51	(51) NL	(Hungary) Újpest	1945–46	
35	Cristiano Ronaldo^{‡} (4)	Portugal	51	(31) NL, (3) NC (17) UCL	(Spain) Real Madrid	2013–14	
35	Cristiano Ronaldo^{‡} (6)	Portugal	51	(35) NL (16) UCL	(Spain) Real Madrid	2015–16	
35	Lionel Messi^{‡} (6)	Argentina	51	(36) NL, (3) NC (12) UCL	(Spain) Barcelona	2018–19	
39	Vic Watson	England	50	(42) NL, (8) NC	(England) West Ham United	1929–30	
39	Tom Waring	England	50	(49) NL, (1) NC	(England) Aston Villa	1930–31	
39	Jimmy McGrory (3)	Scotland	50 (Note: McGrory also scored 1 goal in Glasgow Charity Cup, which included, would make the tally 51 goals that season.)	(50) NL	(Scotland) Celtic	1935–36	
39	Franz Binder	Austria	50	(32) NL, (18) NC	(Austria) Rapid Wien	1939–40	
39	Ferenc Puskás	Hungary	50	(50) NL	(Hungary) Kispesti	1947–48	
39	Eusébio^{‡}	Portugal	50	(42) NL, (2) NC (6) UCL	(Portugal) Benfica	1967–68	
39	Gerd Müller^{‡}	Germany	50	(40) NL, (5) NC (5) UCWC	(Germany) Bayern Munich	1971–72	
39	Héctor Yazalde^{‡}	Argentina	50	(46) NL (4) UCWC	(Portugal) Sporting CP	1973–74	
39	Zlatan Ibrahimović	Sweden	50	(38) NL, (7) NC (5) UCL	(France) Paris Saint-Germain	2015–16	
39	Robert Lewandowski^{‡ GM} (2)	Poland	50	(35) NL, (2) SC (13) UCL	(Germany) Bayern Munich	2021–22	

=== List of top scorers in European football ===
- Does not include goals scored in the lower divisions.
- As of 23 May 2026

List of top scorers in European football (500 or more goals)
Rank	Player	Nationality	Goals	Itemized Goals	Period
1	Lionel Messi	Argentina	704	496 NL, 56 NC, 15 SC, 129 UCL, 3 USC, 5 FCWC	2004–2023
2	Cristiano Ronaldo	Portugal	701	498 NL, 41 NC, 4 LC, 6 SC, 141 UCL, 2 UEL, 2 USC, 7 FCWC	2002–2022
3	Josef Bican	Czech Republic	690	515 NL, 75 NC, 59 OC, 41 OIC	1931–1955
4	Ferenc Puskás	Hungary	640	515 NL, 69 NC, 36 UCL, 2 IC, 18 OIC	1943–1966
5	Jimmy Jones	Northern Ireland	636	332 NL, 43 NC, 247 OC, 14 OIC	1947–1964
6	Robert Lewandowski	Poland	612	427 NL, 52 NC, 14 SC, 109 UCL, 8 UEL, 2 FCWC	2008–2026
7	Joe Bambrick	Northern Ireland	608	348 NL, 40 NC, 220 OC	1926–1943
8	Abe Lenstra	Netherlands	591	289 NL, 284 OL, 18 NC	1936–1963
9	Glenn Ferguson	Northern Ireland	561	313 NL, 56 NC, 185 OC, 2 UCL, 3 UEL, 2 UCWC	1987–2011
10	Jimmy McGrory	Scotland	540	409 NL, 77 NC, 54 OC	1922–1937
11	Gerd Müller	West Germany	526	365 NL, 78 NC, 12 LC, 2 OC, 34 UCL, 4 UEL, 20 UCWC, 7 FC, 3 USC, 1 IC	1964–1979
12	Uwe Seeler	West Germany	509	180 NL, 267 OL, 24 NC, 17 OC, 5 UCL, 3 UEL, 13 UCWC	1954–1978

=== List of top scorers in European national leagues ===
- Does not include goals scored in the lower divisions.
- As of 23 May 2026

List of top scorers in European leagues (400 or more goals)
Rank	Player	Nationality	Goals	Itemized Goals	Period
1	Josef Bican	Czech Republic	515	Austria 71, Czechoslovakia & Bohemia-Moravia 444	1931–1955
=	Ferenc Puskás	Hungary	515	Hungary 358, Spain 157	1943–1966
3	Cristiano Ronaldo	Portugal	498	Portugal 3, England 103, Spain 311, Italy 81	2002–2022
4	Lionel Messi	Argentina	496	Spain 474, France 22	2004–2023
5	Uwe Seeler	West Germany	447	Oberliga Nord (Germany) 308, Germany 137, Ireland 2	1954–1978
6	Robert Lewandowski	Poland	427	Poland 32, Germany 312, Spain 83	2008–2026
7	Jimmy McGrory	Scotland	409	Scotland 409	1922–1937

== Club records ==
=== Most national league titles ===
Titles	Club	Period (first and last title)
57	(Northern Ireland) Linfield	1891–2025 WR
56	(Scotland) Celtic	1893–2026
55	(Scotland) Rangers	1891–2021
48	(Greece) Olympiacos	1931–2025
38	(Portugal) Benfica	1936–2023
37	(Serbia) Red Star Belgrade	1946–2026 (Note: Includes Red Star Belgrade's 18 championships of former Yugoslavia until 1991, their 18 league titles in Serbia (and Montenegro) won since the 1991/92 season, and the 1945/46 title of Serbia won in a regional qualification tournament for the Yugoslav championship and recognised by the FA of Serbia in May 2019.)
36	(Italy) Juventus	1905–2020
36	(Netherlands) Ajax	1918–2022
36	(Spain) Real Madrid	1932–2024
36	(Hungary) Ferencváros	1903–2025
36	(Croatia) Dinamo Zagreb	1923–2026 (Note: Includes Dinamo Zagreb's 4 Yugoslav and 26 Croatian championships since 1947–48 and the championships of HŠK Građanski Zagreb (5 in Yugoslavia before World War II and 1 in the Independent State of Croatia in 1943 during the war; not counting the Croatian First League season of 1941 as it was not finished).)
35	(Czech Republic) Sparta Prague	1926–2024 (Note: Includes Czechoslovak and Czech titles since 1925. Sparta won 21 Czechoslovak and 14 Czech titles.)
35	(Germany) Bayern Munich	1932–2026
34	(Belgium) Anderlecht	1947–2017
33	(Finland) HJK	1911–2023
33	(Austria) Rapid Wien	1912–2008 (Note: Includes Rapid's German title of 1941, along with their 32 Austrian titles.)

=== Most consecutive national league titles ===
Titles	Club	Years
14	(Latvia) Skonto	1991–2004
14	(Gibraltar) Lincoln Red Imps	2003–2016
14	(Bulgaria) Ludogorets Razgrad	2012–2025
13	(Norway) Rosenborg	1992–2004
13	(Belarus) BATE Borisov	2006–2018
11	(Croatia) Dinamo Zagreb	2006–2016
11	(Germany) Bayern Munich	2013–2023
10	(Hungary) MTK Budapest	1914, 1917–1925
10	(East Germany) BFC Dynamo	1979–1988
10	(Georgia (country)) Dinamo Tbilisi	1990–1999
10	(Armenia) Pyunik	2001–2010
10	(Moldova) Sheriff Tiraspol	2001–2010
10	(Austria) Red Bull Salzburg	2014–2023

=== Most consecutive wins across all competitions ===
Matches	Club	Season(s)	Ref.
31	(Northern Ireland) Belfast Celtic	1947–48	
30	(Hungary) Újpest	between 1945 and 1945–46	
27	(Wales) The New Saints	2016–17	
26	(Germany) Dresdner SC	1942–43	
26	(Netherlands) Ajax	1971–72	
26	(Wales) The New Saints	2023–24	
25	(Hungary) Ferencváros	between 1930–31 and 1931–32	
25	(Netherlands) Ajax	between 1994–95 and 1995–96	
25	(Ukraine) Shakhtar Donetsk	between 2011–12 and 2012–13	
23 (Note: Celtic also won in their winning streak, from 30 April 1966 to 2 November 1966, two matches in the 1966–67 Glasgow Cup, between August and October 1966. Including this regional cup, Celtic's winning streak increases to 25 consecutive matches.)	(Scotland) Celtic	between 1965–66 and 1966–67	
23 (Note: Celtic also won in their winning streak, from 3 February 1968 to 11 September 1968, one match in the 1967–68 Glasgow Cup, on 17 April 1968. Including this regional cup, Celtic's winning streak increases to 24 consecutive matches.)	(Scotland) Celtic	between 1967–68 and 1968–69	
23	(Federal Republic of Yugoslavia) Red Star Belgrade	between 1999–2000 and 2000–01	
23	(Germany) Bayern Munich	between 2019–20 and 2020–21	
22	(Spain) Real Madrid	2014–15	
21	(England) Manchester City	2020–21	
21	(Turkey) Fenerbahçe	between 2022–23 and 2023–24	
21	(Faroe Islands) Víkingur	between 2023 and 2024	
20	(Scotland) Rangers	2013–14	
18	(Spain) Barcelona	2005–06	
18	(Portugal) Benfica	2010–11	
18	(Portugal) Porto	2018–19	
17	(Turkey) Galatasaray	2022–23	
17	(Scotland) Celtic	2016–17, 2022–23	
16	(France) Bordeaux	between 2008–09 and 2009–10	
16	(France) Paris Saint-Germain	2015–16	
16	(Germany) Bayern Munich	2025–26	
15	(Spain) Real Madrid	1960–61	
15	(Italy) Milan	between 1991–92 and 1992–93	
15	(Spain) Real Madrid	2011–12	
15	(Scotland) Celtic	between 2023–24 and 2024–25	
15	(Spain) Atlético Madrid	2024–25	

=== Most consecutive wins in domestic league ===
Matches	Club	Seasons	Ref.
32	(Hungary) Ferencváros	between 1930–31 and 1932–33	
30	(Hungary) Újpest	between 1945 and 1945–46	
30	(Wales) The New Saints	between 2023–24 and 2024–25	
29	(Portugal) Benfica	between 1971–72 and 1972–73	
28	(Germany) Dresdner SC	between 1942–43 and 1943–44	
28	(Croatia) Dinamo Zagreb	between 2006–07 and 2007–08	
25	(Albania) Dinamo Tirana	between 1951 and 1952	
25	(Scotland) Celtic	2003–04	
24	(Ukraine) Shakhtar Donetsk	between 2011–12 and 2012–13	
24	(Serbia) Red Star Belgrade	2015–16	
23	(Sweden) Malmö FF	between 1948–49 and 1949–50	
23	(Faroe Islands) KÍ Klaksvík	between 2022 and 2023	
22	(Scotland) Rangers	between 1898–99 and 1899–1900	
22	(Netherlands) PSV Eindhoven	1987–88	
22	(Azerbaijan) Kapaz	1997–98	
22	(Scotland) Celtic	2016–17	
22	(Wales) The New Saints	2016–17	
22	(Serbia) Red Star Belgrade	2020–21	
21	(Faroe Islands) Víkingur	between 2023 and 2024	

=== Longest unbeaten run across all competitions ===
Matches	Club	Years	Ref.
62	(Scotland) Celtic	1915–1917 (Note: Celtic also played in their unbeaten run, from 20 November 1915 to 14 April 1917, in two regional cups, the Glasgow Merchants Charity Cup and Glasgow Cup. Including two matches each in the 1915–16 Glasgow Merchants Charity Cup, in May 1916, and in the 1916–17 Glasgow Cup, in October 1916, Celtic was unbeaten for 66 games.)	
60	(Belgium) Union Saint-Gilloise	1933–1935	
After the introduction of UEFA club competitions (1955–56)
51	(Germany) Bayer Leverkusen	2023–2024	
48	(Portugal) Benfica	1963–1965	
48	(Gibraltar) Lincoln Red Imps	2010–2012 (Note: Lincoln Red Imps did not take part in any European competition during this unbeaten run.)	
45	(Gibraltar) Lincoln Red Imps	2007–2009 (Note: Lincoln Red Imps did not take part in any European competition during this unbeaten run.)	
45	(Croatia) Dinamo Zagreb	2014–2015	
45	(Croatia) Rijeka	2016–2017	
44	(Scotland) Rangers	1992–1993	
43	(Italy) Juventus	2011–2012 (Note: Juventus did not take part in any European competition during this unbeaten run.)	
42	(Italy) Milan	1991–1992	
42	(Netherlands) Ajax	1995–1996	
42	(Scotland) Celtic	2016–2017	
41	(Wales) The New Saints	2023–2024 (Note: The New Saints did not take part in any European competition during this unbeaten run.)	
40	(Italy) Fiorentina	1955–1956 (Note: Fiorentina did not take part in any European competition during this unbeaten run.)	
40	(England) Nottingham Forest	1978	
40	(Italy) Inter Milan	2004–2005	
40	(Spain) Real Madrid	2016–2017	
40	(Serbia) Red Star Belgrade	2020–2021	

=== Longest unbeaten league run ===
Matches	Club	Years	Ref.
104	(Romania) Steaua București	1986–1989	
88	(Gibraltar) Lincoln Red Imps	2009–2014	
65	(Serbia) Red Star Belgrade	2021–2023	
63	(Moldova) Sheriff Tiraspol	2006–2008	
62	(Scotland) Celtic	1915–1917	
61	(Estonia) Levadia	2008–2009	
60	(Belgium) Union Saint-Gilloise	1933–1935	
59	(Armenia) Shirak	1993–1995	
59	(Armenia) Pyunik	2002–2004	
58	(Greece) Olympiacos	1972–1974	
58	(Italy) Milan	1991–1993	
58	(Latvia) Skonto	1993–1996	
58	(Portugal) Porto	2020–2022	
57	(Serbia) Red Star Belgrade	2017–2019	
56	(Portugal) Benfica	1976–1978	
56	(Scotland) Celtic	2016–2017	
55	(Ukraine) Shakhtar Donetsk	2000–2002	
55	(Portugal) Porto	2010–2012	
55	(Serbia) Red Star Belgrade	2020–2022	

=== Longest unbeaten league home run ===
Matches	Club	Years	Ref.
159	(Serbia) Red Star Belgrade	2017–2025	
121	(Spain) Real Madrid	1957–1965	
103	(Croatia) Dinamo Zagreb	2010–2016	
96	(Federal Republic of Yugoslavia) Red Star Belgrade	1998–2004	
93	(Netherlands) PSV Eindhoven	1983–1989	
92	(France) Nantes	1976–1981	
91	(Italy) Torino	1943–1949	
90	(Turkey) Trabzonspor	1975–1981	
89	(Slovakia) Spartak Trnava	1968–1974	
86	(England) Chelsea	2004–2008	
85	(Greece) Panathinaikos	1973–1978	
81	(Portugal) Porto	2008–2014	

=== Longest unbeaten league away run ===
Matches	Club	Years	Ref.
64	(Romania) Steaua București	1986–1990	
62	(Gibraltar) Lincoln Red Imps	2009–2016	
47	(Estonia) Nõmme Kalju	2017–2020	
44	(Moldova) Sheriff Tiraspol	2006–2008	
40	(Turkey) Galatasaray	1998–2000	
39	(Armenia) Pyunik	2002–2005	
39	(France) Paris Saint-Germain	2023–2025	
38	(Italy) Milan	1991–1993	
37	(Germany) Bayer Leverkusen	2023–2025	
35	(Scotland) Celtic	1915–1917	
33	(Turkey) Beşiktaş	1991–1993	
33	(Germany) Bayern Munich	2012–2014	

=== Longest run of games scored in across all competitions ===
Matches	Club	Period	Ref.
85	(Germany) Bayern Munich	(16 February 2020 – 23 October 2021)	
73	(Spain) Real Madrid	(30 April 2016 – 17 September 2017)	
63	(France) Paris Saint-Germain	(4 August 2018 – 22 September 2019)	
61	(Germany) Bayern Munich	(16 March 2013 – 5 April 2014)	
58	(Germany) Bayern Munich	(16 August 2025 – 2 September 2026)	
57	(Serbia) Red Star Belgrade	(6 October 2024 – 19 October 2025)	
53	(Spain) Barcelona	(21 December 2024 – 22 November 2025)	

=== Longest run of games scored in domestic league ===
Matches	Club	Period	Ref.
109	(Gibraltar) Lincoln Red Imps	(matchday 13 of 2006–07 – matchday 13 of 2012–13)	
87	(Germany) Bayern Munich	(matchday 22 of 2019–20 to matchday 6 of 2022–23)	
69	(Serbia) Red Star Belgrade	(matchday 10 of 2016–17 – matchday 8 of 2019–20)	
69	(Greece) PAOK	(matchday 11 of 2017–18 – matchday 21 of 2019–20)	
65	(Germany) Bayern Munich	(matchday 32 of 2011–12 to matchday 28 of 2013–14)	
65	(Netherlands) PSV Eindhoven	(matchday 19 of 2022–23 – matchday 15 of 2024–25)	
64	(Spain) Barcelona	(matchday 22 of 2011–12 to matchday 8 of 2013–14)	
61	(Scotland) Celtic	(matchday 33 of 2015–16 – matchday 18 of 2017–18)	

=== Biggest title-winning points margins ===
Points	Club	Season	Ref.
35	(North Macedonia) Shkëndija	2017–18	
33	(Wales) The New Saints	2023–24	
31	(France) Paris Saint-Germain	2015–16	
31	(Israel) Maccabi Tel Aviv	2018–19	
31	(Switzerland) Young Boys	2020–21	
30	(Scotland) Celtic	2016–17	
29	(Scotland) Celtic	2013–14	
28	(Croatia) Dinamo Zagreb	2007–08	
28	(Greece) Olympiacos	2015–16	
27	(Latvia) Skonto	1995	
27	(Wales) The New Saints	2016–17	
27	(Serbia) Red Star Belgrade	2024–25	
26	(Wales) Barry Town	1997–98	
26	(Denmark) Copenhagen	2010–11	
26	(Greece) Olympiacos	2020–21	

=== Highest attendance at a European domestic match ===
147,365 – Celtic vs Aberdeen, 1936–37 Scottish Cup

=== Highest attendance at a European club competition match ===
135,805 – Celtic vs Leeds United, 1969–70 European Cup

=== Highest goal margin (aggregate) in European club competition ===
- 21 – Chelsea against Jeunesse Hautcharage in 1971–72 European Cup Winners' Cup
  - First leg score: Jeunesse Hautcharage 0–8 Chelsea
  - Second leg score: Chelsea 13–0 Jeunesse Hautcharage
  - Aggregate score: Chelsea 21–0 Jeunesse Hautcharage
- 21 – Feyenoord against Rumelange in 1972–73 UEFA Cup
  - First leg score: Feyenoord 9–0 Rumelange
  - Second leg score: Rumelange 0–12 Feyenoord
  - Aggregate score: Feyenoord 21–0 Rumelange

=== Most goals scored in a tie in European club competition ===
- 22 – Levski Spartak against Reipas Lahti in 1976–77 European Cup Winners' Cup
  - First leg score: Levski Spartak 12–2 Reipas Lahti
  - Second leg score: Reipas Lahti 1–7 Levski Spartak
  - Aggregate score: Levski Spartak 19–3 Reipas Lahti

== See also ==
- UEFA club competition records and statistics
- List of world association football records
- European Golden Shoe
