= Russell Moreland =

Scottish footballer (1901–1986)

Personal information
- Full name: Thomas Edmund Russell Moreland
- Date of birth: 1901
- Place of birth: Springburn, Scotland
- Date of death: 1986 (aged 84–85)
- Place of death: Kirkintilloch, Scotland
- Positions: Forward; left half

Senior career*
Years	Team	Apps	(Gls)
–1922	Petershill		
1922–1927	Queen's Park	114	(24)
1927	Heart of Midlothian	3	(0)
1927–1928	Hamilton Academical	31	(1)
1928–1933	Third Lanark	87	(3)
Total		235	(30)

Managerial career
- 1929–1934: Third Lanark
- 1935–1937: Clyde
- * Club domestic league appearances and goals

Thomas Edmund Russell Moreland (1901–1986) was a Scottish amateur footballer who played in the Scottish League for Queen's Park, Heart of Midlothian, Hamilton Academical and Third Lanark as a forward or left half. In addition to managing Clyde, he served Third Lanark as player-manager and later as a board member.

== Club career ==
After beginning his career with Petershill, Moreland played 11 seasons as a forward or left half for Scottish League clubs Queen's Park, Heart of Midlothian, Hamilton Academical and Third Lanark. As a player, he was a member of Queen's Park's 1922–23 Second Division-winning team and later achieved the same feat as player-manager of Third Lanark in 1930–31. After retiring as a player and departing Third Lanark in 1934, Moreland became manager of First Division club Clyde in 1935 and managed the club to consecutive Scottish Cup semi-finals during the 1935–36 and 1936–37 seasons.

== Representative career ==
Moreland was selected for the Glasgow FA's annual challenge match against Sheffield FA in 1925.

== Personal life ==
Moreland was also active as a boxing promoter and promoted the fights of Jackie Paterson. He ran a sports emporium on Argyle Street in Glasgow, which went into liquidation in 1956.

== Career statistics ==
=== Club ===
Appearances and goals by club, season and competition
Club	Season	League			Scottish Cup		Other		Total	
Club	Season	Division	Apps	Goals	Apps	Goals	Apps	Goals	Apps	Goals
Queen's Park	1922–23	Scottish Second Division	20	19	4	0	2 (Note: Appearances in Glasgow Merchants Charity Cup)	1	26	20
Queen's Park	1923–24	Scottish First Division	25	3	5	1	2 (Note: 1 appearance in Glasgow Cup, 1 appearance in Glasgow Merchants Charity Cup)	0	32	4
Queen's Park	1924–25	Scottish First Division	27	3	2	0	2	0	31	3
Queen's Park	1925–26	Scottish First Division	37	1	2	0	5 (Note: 3 appearances in Glasgow Cup, 2 appearances in Glasgow Merchants Charity Cup)	0	44	1
Queen's Park	1926–27	Scottish First Division	5	0	0	0	0	0	5	0
Queen's Park	Total		114	24	13	1	11	1	138	28
Heart of Midlothian	1926–27	Scottish First Division	3	0	―		0	0	3	0
Hamilton Academical	1927–28	Scottish First Division	31	1	1	0	0	0	0	0
Third Lanark	1928–29	Scottish First Division	21	0	2	0	―		23	0
Third Lanark	1929–30	Scottish Second Division	23	0	0	0	―		23	0
Third Lanark	1930–31	Scottish Second Division	17	3	1	0	―		18	3
Third Lanark	1931–32	Scottish First Division	21	0	1	0	―		22	0
Third Lanark	1932–33	Scottish First Division	5	0	2	0	―		7	0
Third Lanark	Total		87	3	6	0	―		93	3
Career total			235	28	20	1	11	1	266	30

=== Manager ===
Team	From	To	Record					Ref
Team	From	To	G	W	D	L	Win %	Ref
Third Lanark	July 1929	December 1934	225	109	39	77	48.44	
Clyde	February 1935	October 1937	117	38	25	54	32.48	
Total			342	147	64	131	42.98	—

== Honours ==
=== As a player ===
Queen's Park

- Scottish League Second Division: 1922–23

Third Lanark

- Scottish League Second Division: 1930–31

=== As a manager ===
Third Lanark

- Scottish League Second Division: 1930–31
