= Football records =

Various football records can be found in the following pages and categories:

== American football ==
- List of National Football League records (individual)
- List of National Football League records (team)
- Category:American football records and statistics

== Association football ==
- European association football club records and statistics
- UEFA club competition records and statistics
- Category:Association football records and statistics
