= UEFA club competitions =

Set of football tournaments

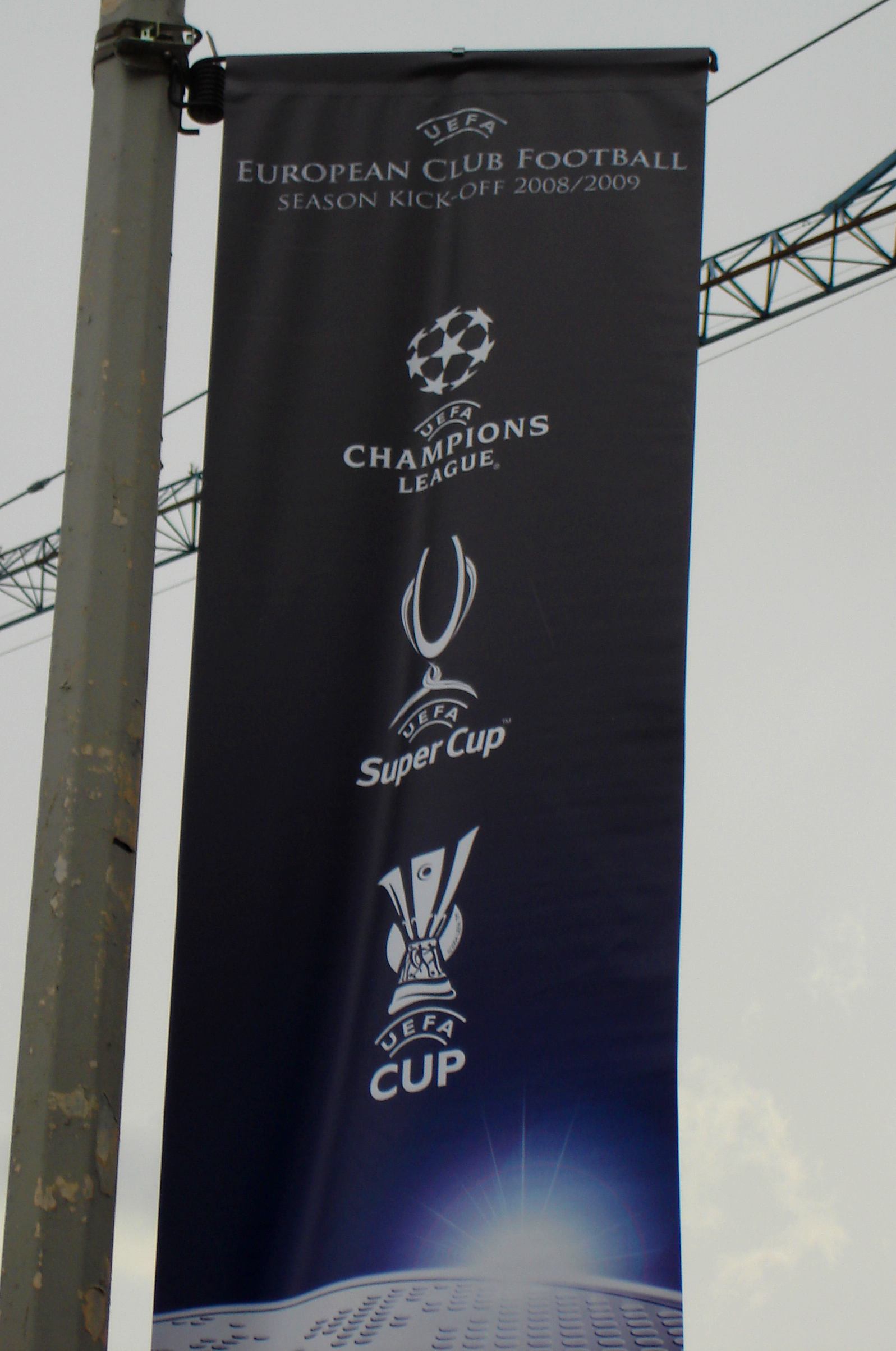
Flag showing the Champions League, the Super Cup and the UEFA Cup (now the UEFA Europa League) logos at Monaco (2008).

UEFA club competitions are UEFA competitions for club teams. The most important in men's senior football are the UEFA Champions League (begun in 1955), UEFA Europa League (begun in 1971) and UEFA Conference League (begun in 2021). UEFA club competitions are distinct from both UEFA competitions for national teams (such as the European Championship and Nations League) and from domestic competitions, confined to the clubs of a single UEFA member football association (FA), such as the Premier League and the FA Cup for English football clubs. Clubs qualify for one season's edition of a UEFA competition based on performance in the previous season in either a UEFA competition or a domestic competition. Colloquially, UEFA club competitions are called European football; a club may be said to have "qualified for Europe" or be "playing in Europe". Performances in recent UEFA club competitions by a given club (and by all clubs in a given FA) are used to calculate a UEFA coefficient for the club (and FA). This coefficient in turn determines number of slots for an FA, and seedings for a club, in the next UEFA club competitions.

There have been non-UEFA international club competitions, such as the Inter-Cities Fairs Cup and Mitropa Cup, which were organised not by UEFA but rather by clubs, member FAs, or private bodies unaffiliated with UEFA. Although the Europa League (then called the UEFA Cup) was a de-facto replacement for the Fairs Cup, UEFA disregards the latter in its statistics as not being a UEFA club competition. Exceptionally, although UEFA did not take charge of the European Cup Winners' Cup until after the completion of the 1960–61 edition, that inaugural season is retrospectively considered a UEFA club competition. In 1962 UEFA adopted the principle that "competitions open to the clubs of all National Associations affiliated to UEFA may only be organized by UEFA itself", although the Fairs Cup was allowed to continue until 1971. Non-UEFA multinational club competitions restricted to a subset of member FAs were still permitted, such as the Baltic League or Anglo-Italian Cup.

== Main tournaments ==
Until the first UEFA Europa Conference League final in 2022, the only team to have won every men's professional club competition was Juventus of Italy. FC Barcelona of Spain became the first women's club to follow its men's team of winning the Champions League, by winning the 2021 Women's Champions League final. The club's men's team won their first title in 1992. The beaten finalists Chelsea of England was also seeking to break that record as well, as its men's team won their maiden in 2012. They were already the first club ever to see its men's and women's teams reach the Champions League final in the same season, having qualified for the Champions League final as well. Barcelona is also the only club in the UEFA zone that has won men's and women's Champions League, the Youth League and the Futsal Champions League among these with active sections which can compete in all these tournaments.

=== UEFA Champions League ===
The UEFA Champions League (abbreviated as UCL, or sometimes, UEFA CL) is an annual club football competition organised by the Union of European Football Associations (UEFA) and contested by top-division European clubs, deciding the competition winners through the eight-week league phase to qualify for a double-legged knockout format, and a single leg final. It is one of the most prestigious football tournaments in the world and the most prestigious club competition in European football, played by the national league champions (and, for some nations, one or more runners-up) of their national associations.

Introduced in 1955 as the Coupe des Clubs Champions Européens (French for European Champion Clubs' Cup), and commonly known as the European Cup, it was initially a straight knockout tournament open only to the champions of Europe's domestic leagues, with its winner reckoned as the European club champion. The competition took on its current name in 1992, adding a round-robin group stage in 1991 and allowing multiple entrants from certain countries since the 1997–98 season. It has since been expanded, and while most of Europe's national leagues can still only enter their champion, the strongest leagues now provide up to five teams. Clubs that finish next-in-line in their national league, having not qualified for the Champions League, are eligible for the second-tier UEFA Europa League competition, and since 2021, for the third-tier UEFA Conference League.

=== UEFA Europa League ===
The UEFA Europa League (abbreviated as UEL, or sometimes, UEFA EL), formerly the UEFA Cup, is an annual football club competition organised since 1971 by the Union of European Football Associations (UEFA) for eligible European football clubs. It is the second-tier competition of European club football, ranking below the UEFA Champions League and above the UEFA Conference League. The UEFA Cup was the third-tier competition from 1971 to 1999 before the UEFA Cup Winners' Cup was discontinued, and it is still often referred to as the "C3" in reference of this. Clubs qualify for the competition based on their performance in their national leagues and cup competitions.

Introduced in 1971 as the UEFA Cup, it replaced the Inter-Cities Fairs Cup. In 1999, the UEFA Cup Winners' Cup was merged with the UEFA Cup and discontinued as a separate competition. From the 2004–05 season a group stage was added before the knockout phase. The competition has been known as the Europa League since the 2009–10 season, following a change in format. The 2009 re-branding included a merge with the UEFA Intertoto Cup, producing an enlarged competition format, with an expanded group stage and a change in qualifying criteria. The winner of the UEFA Europa League qualifies for the UEFA Super Cup and, since the 2014–15 season, qualifies for the following season's UEFA Champions League, entering at the group stage.

=== UEFA Conference League ===
The UEFA Conference League, formerly known as the UEFA Europa Conference League, is an annual football club competition organised by the Union of European Football Associations (UEFA) for eligible European football clubs. Clubs qualify for the competition based on their performance in their national leagues and cup competitions. It is the third tier of active European club football competitions, after the Champions League and the Europa League.

First contested in the 2021–22 season as the UEFA Europa Conference League, the competition serves as the bottom level of the Europa League, which was reduced from 48 to 32 teams in the group stage. The competition is primarily contested by teams from lower-ranked UEFA member associations. No teams qualify directly to the eight-week league phase, with 10 teams eliminated in the Europa League play-offs and the rest coming from the Conference League qualifiers. The winners of the competition are awarded a position in the Europa League the following season, unless they qualify for the Champions League.

== See also ==
- UEFA club competition records and statistics
- UEFA competitions

== Bibliography ==
- "Vision Europe" (PDF). Nyon: Union des Associations Européennes de Football. April 2005. Archived (PDF) from the original on 21 March 2006.
- Vieli, André (2014). UEFA: 60 years at the heart of football (PDF). Nyon: Union des Associations Européennes de Football. doi:10.22005/bcu.175315. Archived (PDF) from the original on 3 August 2021.
