= 1935–36 Heart of Midlothian F.C. season =

Heart of Midlothian
1935–36 season
- Manager: David Pratt
- Stadium: Tynecastle Park
- Scottish First Division: 5th
- Scottish Cup: Round 1

During the 1935–36 season Hearts competed in the Scottish First Division, the Scottish Cup and the East of Scotland Shield.

== Fixtures ==
=== Friendlies ===
31 July 1935 Practice	Hearts	2–2	Hearts "A"	Tynecastle Park
	Goal

30 September 1935 Benefit	Notts County	2–4	Hearts	Meadow Lane
	Goal

6 November 1935 Benefit	Hearts	4–2	Beogradski SK	Tynecastle Park
	Goal

25 November 1935 Benefit	Chelsea	0–2	Hearts	Stamford Bridge
	Goal

11 December 1935 Friendly	Hearts	3–0	Austria Vienna	Tynecastle Park
	Goal

18 April 1936 Friendly	Workington	1–1	Hearts	Lonsdale Park
	Goal

20 April 1936 Benefit	Scottish Junior XI	4–6	Hearts	Victoria Park
	Goal

28 April 1936 Friendly	Camelon Juniors	6–0	Hearts	Victoria Park
	Goal

29 April 1936 Friendly	Linlithgow Rose	5–1	Hearts	Lower Main Park
	Goal

29 April 1936 Friendly	Chesterfield	2–2	Hearts	Saltergate
	Goal

30 April 1936 Friendly	Chirnside United	1–1	Hearts	Croftfield
	Goal

=== Wilson Cup ===
14 August 1935 Final	Hibernian	3–4	Hearts	Easter Road
	Goal

=== East of Scotland Shield ===
11 September 1935 Semi-Final	Hearts	6–1	Leith Athletic	Tynecastle Park
				Attendance: 3,527

30 April 1936 Final	Hearts	2–2	St Bernard's	Tynecastle Park
				Attendance: 5,000

=== Rosebery Charity Cup ===
2 May 1936 R1	Hearts	7–0	Leith Athletic	Tynecastle Park
	Goal

13 May 1936 Semi-Final	Hearts	6–4	Dunfermline Athletic	Tynecastle Park
	Goal

15 May 1936 Final	Hearts	2–0	St Bernard's	Tynecastle Park
	Goal

=== Scottish Cup ===
29 January 1936 Scottish Cup R1	Third Lanark	2–0	Hearts	Cathkin Park
				Attendance: 23,236

=== Scottish First Division ===
10 August 1935 Scottish First Division	Hearts	2–0	Partick Thistle	Tynecastle Park
				Attendance: 29,349

17 August 1935 Scottish First Division	Airdrieonians	3–1	Hearts	Broomfield Park
				Attendance: 5,000

24 August 1935 Scottish First Division	Hearts	1–1	Dunfermline Athletic	Tynecastle Park
				Attendance: 28,074

27 August 1935 Scottish First Division	Queen's Park	2–2	Hearts	Hampden Park
				Attendance: 9,487

31 August 1935 Scottish First Division	Dundee	2–5	Hearts	Dens Park
				Attendance: 16,000

7 September 1935 Scottish First Division	Hearts	2–1	Arbroath	Tynecastle Park
				Attendance: 23,677

14 September 1935 Scottish First Division	Ayr United	1–3	Hearts	Somerset Park
				Attendance: 9,000

18 September 1935 Scottish First Division	Queen of the South	2–0	Hearts	Palmerston Park
				Attendance: 5,000

21 September 1935 Scottish First Division	Hearts	8–3	Hibernian	Tynecastle Park
				Attendance: 27,014

28 September 1935 Scottish First Division	Celtic	2–1	Hearts	Celtic Park
				Attendance: 18,000

5 October 1935 Scottish First Division	Hearts	2–0	Third Lanark	Tynecastle Park
				Attendance: 13,782

12 October 1935 Scottish First Division	Motherwell	4–2	Hearts	Fir Park
				Attendance: 6,000

19 October 1935 Scottish First Division	Rangers	1–1	Hearts	Ibrox Park
				Attendance: 26,000

26 October 1935 Scottish First Division	Hearts	4–2	Albion Rovers	Tynecastle Park
				Attendance: 13,030

2 November 1935 Scottish First Division	Hearts	6–1	St Johnstone	Tynecastle Park
				Attendance: 18,051

9 November 1935 Scottish First Division	Kilmarnock	2–0	Hearts	Rugby Park
				Attendance: 6,000

16 November 1935 Scottish First Division	Hearts	3–3	Clyde	Tynecastle Park
				Attendance: 13,193

23 November 1935 Scottish First Division	Hamilton Academical	3–4	Hearts	Douglas Park
				Attendance: 8,000

30 November 1935 Scottish First Division	Aberdeen	2–1	Hearts	Pittodrie Park
				Attendance: 18,000

7 December 1935 Scottish First Division	Hearts	4–1	Queen's Park	Tynecastle Park
				Attendance: 12,189

14 December 1935 Scottish First Division	Hearts	2–0	Queen of the South	Tynecastle Park
				Attendance: 9,450

28 December 1935 Scottish First Division	Hearts	3–0	Airdrieonians	Tynecastle Park
				Attendance: 13,093

1 January 1936 Scottish First Division	Hibernian	1–1	Hearts	Easter Road
				Attendance: 37,306

2 January 1936 Scottish First Division	Hearts	3–0	Dundee	Tynecastle Park
				Attendance: 20,947

4 January 1936 Scottish First Division	Dunfermline Athletic	2–0	Hearts	East End Park
				Attendance: 13,000

11 January 1936 Scottish First Division	Arbroath	1–3	Hearts	Gayfield Park
				Attendance: 4,000

18 January 1936 Scottish First Division	Hearts	3–0	Ayr United	Tynecastle Park
				Attendance: 12,704

1 February 1936 Scottish First Division	Hearts	1–0	Celtic	Tynecastle Park
				Attendance: 30,930

8 February 1936 Scottish First Division	Partick Thistle	1–0	Hearts	Firhill Park
				Attendance: 10,000

15 February 1936 Scottish First Division	Third Lanark	1–5	Hearts	Cathkin Park
				Attendance: 7,000

22 February 1936 Scottish First Division	Hearts	4–1	Hamilton Academical	Tynecastle Park
				Attendance: 12,166

29 February 1936 Scottish First Division	Hearts	2–2	Motherwell	Tynecastle Park
				Attendance: 19,621

14 March 1936 Scottish First Division	Albion Rovers	1–2	Hearts	Cliftonhill
				Attendance: 3,000

21 March 1936 Scottish First Division	St Johnstone	3–1	Hearts	Muirton Park
				Attendance: 5,000

1 April 1936 Scottish First Division	Hearts	4–2	Kilmarnock	Tynecastle Park
				Attendance: 5,292

11 April 1936 Scottish First Division	Clyde	1–0	Hearts	Shawfield Stadium
				Attendance: 16,000

22 April 1936 Scottish First Division	Hearts	1–1	Rangers	Tynecastle Park
				Attendance: 28,811

25 April 1936 Scottish First Division	Hearts	1–2	Aberdeen	Tynecastle Park
				Attendance: 17,515

== See also ==
- List of Heart of Midlothian F.C. seasons
