= List of UEFA club competition winners =

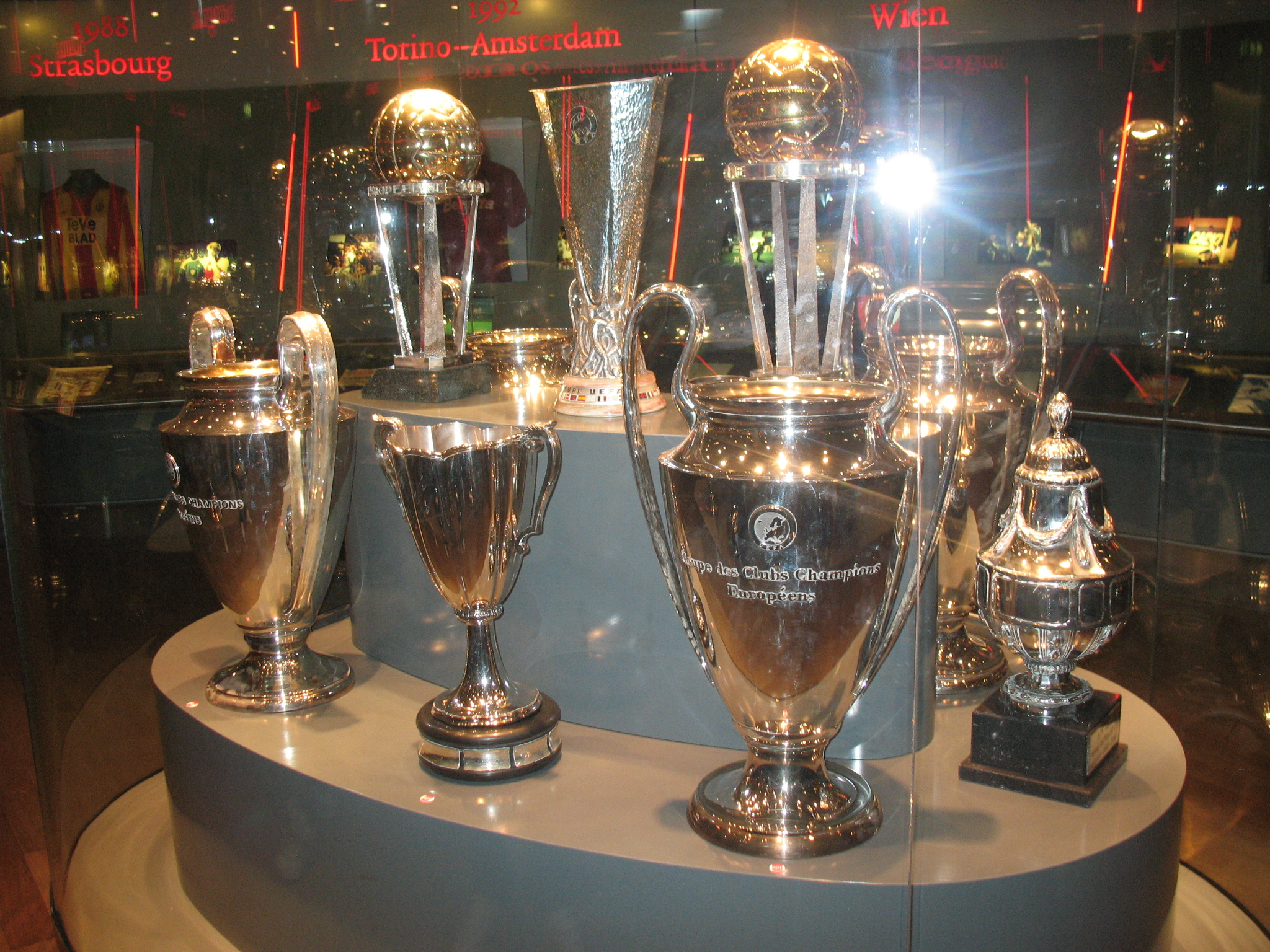
Ajax's international trophies displayed in the club's museum. The Dutch club is one of five teams to have won UEFA's three main club competitions until 2021: European Cup/Champions League (4), Cup Winners' Cup (1) and UEFA Cup (1).

The Union of European Football Associations (UEFA) is the governing body for association football in Europe. It organises four club competitions: the UEFA Champions League (formerly European Cup), the UEFA Europa League (formerly UEFA Cup), the UEFA Conference League (formerly UEFA Europa Conference League), and the UEFA Super Cup. UEFA was also responsible for the Cup Winners' Cup and the Intertoto Cup until their discontinuation in 1999 and 2008, respectively. Together with the Confederación Sudamericana de Fútbol (CONMEBOL), it also organised the Intercontinental Cup, which was last held in 2004, before its replacement by FIFA's Club World Cup.

Spanish side Real Madrid have won a record total of 26 titles in UEFA competitions, nine more than AC Milan (Italy). Before the establishment of the Conference League in 2021–22, the only team to have won every UEFA club competition was Juventus (Italy). They received The UEFA Plaque on 12 July 1988, in recognition of winning the then-three seasonal confederation trophies – the UEFA Cup in 1977, the Cup Winners' Cup in 1984, and the European Cup in 1985, the first club to do so. Juventus additionally won their first Super Cup in 1984, their first Intercontinental Cup in 1985, and the Intertoto Cup in 1999. Upon winning the 2024–25 UEFA Conference League, Chelsea became the first club to win all four major UEFA club competitions (Champions League, Europa League, Cup Winners' Cup, and Conference League).

Spanish clubs have won the most titles (67), ahead of clubs from England (52) and Italy (50). Italy is the only country in European football history whose clubs won the three main competitions in the same season: in 1989–90, Milan retained the European Cup, Sampdoria won the Cup Winners' Cup, and Juventus secured the UEFA Cup.

While the Inter-Cities Fairs Cup is considered to be the predecessor of the UEFA Cup, it is not officially recognised by UEFA and therefore successes in this competition are not included in this list. Also excluded are the unofficial 1972 European Super Cup, the FIFA Club World Cup, and the FIFA Intercontinental Cup, the latter two being organised by the world's governing body.

== Winners ==
=== By club ===
Real Madrid holds the record for the most titles overall with 26, followed by Milan's 17 titles. Spanish teams hold the record for the most wins in the three out of four main UEFA club competitions: Real Madrid, with 15 European Cup/UEFA Champions League titles; Sevilla, with 7 UEFA Cup/UEFA Europa League titles; and Barcelona, with 4 Cup Winners' Cup titles. Real Madrid have the most Super Cup wins (6), and also share the most Intercontinental Cup wins (3) with Milan. German clubs Hamburger SV, Schalke 04 and VfB Stuttgart, and Spanish club Villarreal are the record holders in the UEFA Intertoto Cup (two titles each).

Before the Conference League was established in 2021–22, Juventus, Ajax, Bayern Munich, Chelsea, and Manchester United were the only teams to win all of UEFA's three main club competitions (European Cup/UEFA Champions League, Cup Winners' Cup, UEFA Cup/UEFA Europa League). Juventus additionally won the Super Cup, the Intertoto Cup and the Intercontinental Cup, making it the only team to win six different UEFA competitions. Upon winning the Conference League in 2025, Chelsea became the first club to win all four main UEFA club competitions.

The following table lists all the clubs that have won at least one UEFA club competition, and is updated as of the 2026 UEFA Super Cup played on 12 August 2026.

Key
UCL	European Cup / UEFA Champions League
UEL	UEFA Cup / UEFA Europa League
UEC	UEFA Conference League
CWC	UEFA Cup Winners' Cup (defunct)
USC	UEFA Super Cup
UIC	UEFA Intertoto Cup (defunct)
IC	Intercontinental Cup (defunct)

- The column for each competition wikilinks to the article about those finals.

List of UEFA club competition winners
Club	Country	UCL	UEL	UEC	CWC	USC	UIC	IC	Total
Real Madrid	Spain	15	2	0	0	6	0	3	26
Milan	Italy	7	0	0	2	5	0	3	17
Barcelona	Spain	5	0	0	4	5	0	0	14
Liverpool	England	6	3	0	0	4	0	0	13
Bayern Munich	Germany	6	1	0	1	2	0	2	12
Juventus	Italy	2	3	0	1	2	1	2	11
Ajax	Netherlands	4	1	0	1	2	0	2	10
Chelsea	England	2	2	1	2	2	0	0	9
Inter Milan	Italy	3	3	0	0	0	0	2	8
Sevilla	Spain	0	7	0	0	1	0	0	8
Atlético Madrid	Spain	0	3	0	1	3	0	1	8
Manchester United	England	3	1	0	1	1	0	1	7
Porto	Portugal	2	2	0	0	1	0	2	7
Paris Saint-Germain	France	2	0	0	1	2	1	0	6
Anderlecht	Belgium	0	1	0	2	2	0	0	5
Valencia	Spain	0	1	0	1	2	1	0	5
Feyenoord	Netherlands	1	2	0	0	0	0	1	4
Aston Villa	England	1	1	0	0	1	1	0	4
Hamburger SV	Germany	1	0	0	1	0	2	0	4
Tottenham Hotspur	England	0	3	0	1	0	0	0	4
Parma	Italy	0	2	0	1	1	0	0	4
Nottingham Forest	England	2	0	0	0	1	0	0	3
Manchester City	England	1	0	0	1	1	0	0	3
Borussia Dortmund	Germany	1	0	0	1	0	0	1	3
Schalke 04	Germany	0	1	0	0	0	2	0	3
Villarreal	Spain	0	1	0	0	0	2	0	3
West Ham United	England	0	0	1	1	0	1	0	3
Dynamo Kyiv	Ukraine	0	0	0	2	1	0	0	3
Benfica	Portugal	2	0	0	0	0	0	0	2
PSV Eindhoven	Netherlands	1	1	0	0	0	0	0	2
Steaua București	Romania	1	0	0	0	1	0	0	2
Marseille	France	1	0	0	0	0	1	0	2
Red Star Belgrade	Serbia	1	0	0	0	0	0	1	2
Borussia Mönchengladbach	Germany	0	2	0	0	0	0	0	2
IFK Göteborg	Sweden	0	2	0	0	0	0	0	2
Eintracht Frankfurt	Germany	0	2	0	0	0	0	0	2
Galatasaray	Turkey	0	1	0	0	1	0	0	2
Zenit Saint Petersburg	Russia	0	1	0	0	1	0	0	2
Aberdeen	Scotland	0	0	0	1	1	0	0	2
Lazio	Italy	0	0	0	1	1	0	0	2
KV Mechelen	Belgium	0	0	0	1	1	0	0	2
Werder Bremen	Germany	0	0	0	1	0	1	0	2
VfB Stuttgart	Germany	0	0	0	0	0	2	0	2
Celtic	Scotland	1	0	0	0	0	0	0	1
Atalanta	Italy	0	1	0	0	0	0	0	1
Bayer Leverkusen	Germany	0	1	0	0	0	0	0	1
CSKA Moscow	Russia	0	1	0	0	0	0	0	1
Ipswich Town	England	0	1	0	0	0	0	0	1
Napoli	Italy	0	1	0	0	0	0	0	1
Shakhtar Donetsk	Ukraine	0	1	0	0	0	0	0	1
Crystal Palace	England	0	0	1	0	0	0	0	1
Olympiacos	Greece	0	0	1	0	0	0	0	1
Roma	Italy	0	0	1	0	0	0	0	1
Arsenal	England	0	0	0	1	0	0	0	1
Dinamo Tbilisi	Georgia	0	0	0	1	0	0	0	1
Everton	England	0	0	0	1	0	0	0	1
Fiorentina	Italy	0	0	0	1	0	0	0	1
1. FC Magdeburg	Germany	0	0	0	1	0	0	0	1
Rangers	Scotland	0	0	0	1	0	0	0	1
Sampdoria	Italy	0	0	0	1	0	0	0	1
Slovan Bratislava	Slovakia	0	0	0	1	0	0	0	1
Sporting CP	Portugal	0	0	0	1	0	0	0	1
Zaragoza	Spain	0	0	0	1	0	0	0	1
Auxerre	France	0	0	0	0	0	1	0	1
Bastia	France	0	0	0	0	0	1	0	1
Bologna	Italy	0	0	0	0	0	1	0	1
Bordeaux	France	0	0	0	0	0	1	0	1
Braga	Portugal	0	0	0	0	0	1	0	1
Celta Vigo	Spain	0	0	0	0	0	1	0	1
Fulham	England	0	0	0	0	0	1	0	1
Guingamp	France	0	0	0	0	0	1	0	1
Karlsruher SC	Germany	0	0	0	0	0	1	0	1
Lens	France	0	0	0	0	0	1	0	1
Lille	France	0	0	0	0	0	1	0	1
Lyon	France	0	0	0	0	0	1	0	1
Málaga	Spain	0	0	0	0	0	1	0	1
Montpellier	France	0	0	0	0	0	1	0	1
Newcastle United	England	0	0	0	0	0	1	0	1
Perugia	Italy	0	0	0	0	0	1	0	1
Strasbourg	France	0	0	0	0	0	1	0	1
Silkeborg	Denmark	0	0	0	0	0	1	0	1
Troyes	France	0	0	0	0	0	1	0	1
Udinese	Italy	0	0	0	0	0	1	0	1

=== By country ===
Spanish clubs are the most successful in UEFA competitions, with a total of 67 titles, and hold the record for wins in the European Cup/UEFA Champions League (20), UEFA Super Cup (17), and UEFA Cup/UEFA Europa League (14). English clubs have won 52 titles, including a record eight wins in the UEFA Cup Winners' Cup and three in the UEFA Conference League. Italian clubs are third with 50 wins, and have the most victories in the Intercontinental Cup (7); they also have a distinction of being the only ones who have won the three main UEFA competitions in the same season (1989–90).

The following table lists all the countries whose clubs have won at least one UEFA competition, and is updated as of the 2026 UEFA Super Cup played on 12 August 2026.

Key
UCL	European Cup / UEFA Champions League
UEL	UEFA Cup / UEFA Europa League
UEC	UEFA Conference League
CWC	UEFA Cup Winners' Cup (defunct)
USC	UEFA Super Cup
UIC	UEFA Intertoto Cup (defunct)
IC	Intercontinental Cup (defunct)

List of UEFA club competition winners by country (Note: The records of clubs from currently non-existing associations such as the Soviet Union, Czechoslovakia, East Germany and Yugoslavia are attributed to those federations, since the corresponding titles were won when the clubs were affiliated to those associations.)
Nationality	UCL	UEL	UEC	CWC	USC	UIC	IC	Total
Spain	20	14	0	7	17	5	4	67
England	15	11	3	8	10	4	1	52
Italy	12	10	1	7	9	4	7	50
Germany (Note: Including West Germany.)	8	7	0	4	2	8	3	32
France	3	0	0	1	2	12	0	18
Netherlands	6	4	0	1	2	0	3	16
Portugal	4	2	0	1	1	1	2	11
Belgium	0	1	0	3	3	0	0	7
Scotland	1	0	0	2	1	0	0	4
Soviet Union	0	0	0	3	1	0	0	4
Russia	0	2	0	0	1	0	0	3
Romania	1	0	0	0	1	0	0	2
Turkey	0	1	0	0	1	0	0	2
Yugoslavia	1	0	0	0	0	0	1	2
Sweden	0	2	0	0	0	0	0	2
East Germany	0	0	0	1	0	0	0	1
Czechoslovakia	0	0	0	1	0	0	0	1
Ukraine	0	1	0	0	0	0	0	1
Greece	0	0	1	0	0	0	0	1
Denmark	0	0	0	0	0	1	0	1

== See also ==
- List of football clubs by competitive honours won
- UEFA club competition records and statistics
