= 1926–27 Celtic F.C. season =

Celtic
1926–27 season
- Manager: Willie Maley
- Stadium: Celtic Park
- Scottish First Division: 3rd place
- Scottish Cup: Champion

The 1926–27 Scottish football season was Celtic's 39th season of competitive football, in which they competed in the Scottish First Division and the Scottish Cup.

Celtic were unable to retain their league champions title as they ended the season third below Motherwell and champions Rangers.

However, their cup campaign proved way more successful as they reached the final for the third year in a row and they managed to win it 3-1 against surprise finalists, Division Two team East Fife.

This was Celtic's 12th Scottish Cup and their 29th major honour, a record at the time.

== Competitions ==
=== Scottish First Division ===
==== League table ====
Pos	Team	Pld	W	D	L	GF	GA	GD	Pts
1	Rangers	38	23	10	5	85	41	+44	56
2	Motherwell	38	23	5	10	81	52	+29	51
3	Celtic	38	21	7	10	101	55	+46	49
4	Airdrieonians	38	18	9	11	97	64	+33	45
5	Dundee	38	17	9	12	77	51	+26	43

Source: "1926-1927 Division 1 - SPFL Archive". SPFL.

==== Matches ====
14 August 1926 First Division	Kilmarnock	2–3	Celtic	Kilmarnock
				Stadium: Rugby Park; Attendance: 20,000

21 August 1926 First Division	Celtic	2–0	Cowdenbeath	Glasgow
				Stadium: Celtic Park; Attendance: 10,000

28 August 1926 First Division	Queen's Park	1–6	Celtic	Glasgow
				Stadium: Hampden Park; Attendance: 20,000

4 September 1926 First Division	Celtic	3–0	Morton	Glasgow
				Stadium: Celtic Park; Attendance: 10,000

11 September 1926 First Division	Clyde	2–2	Celtic	Glasgow
				Stadium: Shawfield Stadium; Attendance: 15,000

18 September 1926 First Division	Celtic	2–2	Hamilton Academical	Glasgow
				Stadium: Celtic Park; Attendance: 12,000

25 September 1926 First Division	Hibernian	3–2	Celtic	Edinburgh
				Stadium: Easter Road; Attendance: 20,000

2 October 1926 First Division	Celtic	0–0	Dundee	Glasgow
				Stadium: Celtic Park; Attendance: 25,000

16 October 1926 First Division	St Mirren	3–1	Celtic	Paisley
				Stadium: St Mirren Park, Love Street; Attendance: 12,000

23 October 1926 First Division	Celtic	6–2	Aberdeen	Glasgow
				Stadium: Celtic Park; Attendance: 12,000

6 November 1926 First Division	Airdrieonians	2–2	Celtic	Airdrie
				Stadium: Broomfield Park; Attendance: 12,000

13 November 1926 First Division	Celtic	1–0	Hearts	Glasgow
				Stadium: Celtic Park; Attendance: 20,000

20 November 1926 First Division	Dunfermline Athletic	0–6	Celtic	Dunfermline
				Stadium: East End Park; Attendance: 6,500

27 November 1926 First Division	Celtic	7–2	Dundee United	Glasgow
				Stadium: Celtic Park; Attendance: 4,000

4 December 1926 First Division	Motherwell	0–1	Celtic	Motherwell
				Stadium: Fir Park; Attendance: 20,000

11 December 1926 First Division	Celtic	4–0	St Johnstone	Glasgow
				Stadium: Celtic Park; Attendance: 5,000

18 December 1926 First Division	Partick Thistle	0–3	Celtic	Glasgow
				Stadium: Firhill; Attendance: 20,000

25 December 1926 First Division	Celtic	4–0	Kilmarnock	Glasgow
				Stadium: Celtic Park; Attendance: 12,000

1 January 1927 First Division	Rangers	2–1	Celtic	Glasgow
				Stadium: Ibrox Park; Attendance: 63,000

3 January 1927 First Division	Celtic	2–3	Queen's Park	Glasgow
				Stadium: Celtic Park; Attendance: 15,000

8 January 1927 First Division	Morton	2–6	Celtic	Greenock
				Stadium: Cappielow Park; Attendance: 6,000

15 January 1927 First Division	Celtic	7–0	Clyde	Glasgow
				Stadium: Celtic Park; Attendance: 10,000

2 February 1927 First Division	Celtic	2–3	Hibernian	Glasgow
				Stadium: Celtic Park; Attendance: 15,000

12 February 1927 First Division	Dundee	1–2	Celtic	Dundee
				Stadium: Dens Park; Attendance: 18,000

16 February 1927 First Division	Hamilton Academical	3–3	Celtic	Hamilton
				Stadium: Douglas Park; Attendance: 5,000

23 February 1927 First Division	Celtic	3–1	Falkirk	Glasgow
				Stadium: Celtic Park; Attendance: 12,000

26 February 1927 First Division	Celtic	6–2	St Mirren	Glasgow
				Stadium: Celtic Park; Attendance: 10,000

9 March 1927 First Division	Aberdeen	0–0	Celtic	Aberdeen
				Stadium: Pittodrie Park; Attendance: 11,000

12 March 1927 First Division	Cowdenbeath	2–1	Celtic	Cowdenbeath
				Stadium: Central Park; Attendance: 10,000

16 March 1927 First Division	Celtic	2–1	Airdrieonians	Glasgow
				Stadium: Celtic Park; Attendance: 12,000

30 March 1927 First Division	Hearts	3–0	Celtic	Edinburgh
				Stadium: Tynecastle Park; Attendance: 15,500

2 April 1927 First Division	Celtic	2–1	Dunfermline Athletic	Glasgow
				Stadium: Celtic Park; Attendance: 3,000

6 April 1927 First Division	Falkirk	4–1	Celtic	Falkirk
				Stadium: Brockville Park; Attendance: 6,000

9 April 1927 First Division	Dundee United	3–3	Celtic	Dundee
				Stadium: Tannadice Park; Attendance: 5,000

18 April 1927 First Division	Celtic	0–1	Rangers	Glasgow
				Stadium: Celtic Park; Attendance: 35,000

20 April 1927 First Division	Celtic	3–2	Motherwell	Glasgow
				Stadium: Celtic Park; Attendance: 5,000

23 April 1927 First Division	St Johnstone	1–0	Celtic	Perth
				Stadium: Muirton Park; Attendance: 12,000

30 April 1927 First Division	Celtic	2–1	Partick Thistle	Glasgow
				Stadium: Celtic Park; Attendance: 5,000

=== Scottish Cup ===
22 January 1927 First round	Queen of the South	0–0	Celtic	Dumfries
				Stadium: Palmerston Park; Attendance: 8,000

26 January 1927 First round replay	Celtic	4–1	Queen of the South	Glasgow
				Stadium: Celtic Park; Attendance: 7,000

5 February 1927 Second round	Brechin City	3–6	Celtic	Brechin
				Stadium: Glebe Park; Attendance: 4,000

19 February 1927 Third round	Dundee	2–4	Celtic	Dundee
				Stadium: Dens Park; Attendance: 37,471

5 March 1927 Fourth round	Bo'ness	2–5	Celtic	Bo'ness
				Stadium: Newtown Park; Attendance: 9,000

26 March 1927 Semi-final	Falkirk	0–1	Celtic	Glasgow
				Stadium: Ibrox Park; Attendance: 73,000

16 April 1927 Final	Celtic	3–1	East Fife	Glasgow
				Stadium: Hampden Park; Attendance: 80,070
