= 1926–27 Heart of Midlothian F.C. season =

Heart of Midlothian
1926–27 season
- Manager: Willie McCartney
- Stadium: Tynecastle Park
- Scottish First Division: 4th
- Scottish Cup: 1st Round

During the 1926–27 season Hearts competed in the Scottish First Division, the Scottish Cup and the East of Scotland Shield.

== Fixtures ==
=== Scottish Cup ===
22 January 1927 Scottish Cup R1	Clyde	3–2	Hearts	Shawfield Stadium
				Attendance: 18,000

=== Scottish First Division ===
14 August 1926 Scottish First Division	Dundee	4–1	Hearts	Dens Park
				Attendance: 14,000

21 August 1926 Scottish First Division	Hearts	4–1	Queen's Park	Tynecastle Park
				Attendance: 22,500

28 August 1926 Scottish First Division	Cowdenbeath	2–1	Hearts	Central Park
				Attendance: 10,000

4 September 1926 Scottish First Division	Hearts	1–1	Hamilton Academical	Tynecastle Park
				Attendance: 19,000

11 September 1926 Scottish First Division	Morton	1–3	Hearts	Cappielow Park
				Attendance: 7,000

18 September 1926 Scottish First Division	Hearts	0–2	Rangers	Tynecastle Park
				Attendance: 32,000

25 September 1926 Scottish First Division	Kilmarnock	1–4	Hearts	Rugby Park
				Attendance: 6,000

2 October 1926 Scottish First Division	Hearts	0–0	Falkirk	Tynecastle Park
				Attendance: 22,500

9 October 1926 Scottish First Division	Clyde	2–3	Hearts	Shawfield Stadium
				Attendance: 3,000

16 October 1926 Scottish First Division	Hearts	1–0	Partick Thistle	Tynecastle Park
				Attendance: 20,000

23 October 1926 Scottish First Division	Motherwell	5–1	Hearts	Fir Park
				Attendance: 8,000

30 October 1926 Scottish First Division	Hearts	2–2	Hibernian	Tynecastle Park
				Attendance: 25,500

6 November 1926 Scottish First Division	Hearts	4–3	St Mirren	Tynecastle Park
				Attendance: 17,500

13 November 1926 Scottish First Division	Celtic	1–0	Hearts	Celtic Park
				Attendance: 20,000

20 November 1926 Scottish First Division	Aberdeen	6–5	Hearts	Pittodrie Park
				Attendance: 13,000

27 November 1926 Scottish First Division	Hearts	0–0	St Johnstone	Tynecastle Park
				Attendance: 16,000

4 December 1926 Scottish First Division	Dundee United	5–3	Hearts	Tannadice Park
				Attendance: 8,000

11 December 1926 Scottish First Division	Airdrieonians	3–1	Hearts	Broomfield Park
				Attendance: 15,000

18 December 1926 Scottish First Division	Dunfermline Athletic	0–2	Hearts	East End Park
				Attendance: 6,000

25 December 1926 Scottish First Division	Hearts	0–0	Dundee	Tynecastle Park
				Attendance: 16,500

1 January 1927 Scottish First Division	Hibernian	2–2	Hearts	Tynecastle Park
				Attendance: 27,000

3 January 1927 Scottish First Division	Hearts	4–3	Cowdenbeath	Tynecastle Park
				Attendance: 24,000

8 January 1927 Scottish First Division	Hamilton Academical	2–1	Hearts	Douglas Park
				Attendance: 2,000

15 January 1927 Scottish First Division	Hearts	3–0	Morton	Tynecastle Park
				Attendance: 15,500

29 January 1927 Scottish First Division	Rangers	1–0	Hearts	Ibrox Park
				Attendance: 15,000

5 February 1927 Scottish First Division	Hearts	1–3	Motherwell	Tynecastle Park
				Attendance: 12,500

12 February 1927 Scottish First Division	Falkirk	2–1	Hearts	Brockville Park
				Attendance: 7,000

19 February 1927 Scottish First Division	Hearts	1–1	Kilmarnock	Tynecastle Park
				Attendance: 12,000

23 February 1927 Scottish First Division	Hearts	5–0	Clyde	Tynecastle Park
				Attendance: 4,500

26 February 1927 Scottish First Division	Partick Thistle	2–2	Hearts	Firhill Park
				Attendance: 3,000

12 March 1927 Scottish First Division	Queen's Park	2–0	Hearts	Hampden Park
				Attendance: 15,000

19 March 1927 Scottish First Division	St Mirren	0–1	Hearts	St Mirren Park, Love Street
				Attendance: 9,000

30 March 1927 Scottish First Division	Hearts	3–0	Celtic	Tynecastle Park
				Attendance: 15,500

2 April 1927 Scottish First Division	Hearts	2–2	Aberdeen	Tynecastle Park
				Attendance: 11,500

9 April 1927 Scottish First Division	St Johnstone	1–1	Hearts	Muirton Park
				Attendance: 5,000

16 April 1927 Scottish First Division	Hearts	1–2	Dundee United	Tynecastle Park
				Attendance: 9,500

23 April 1927 Scottish First Division	Airdrieonians	0–0	Hearts	Broomfield Park
				Attendance: 3,000

30 April 1927 Scottish First Division	Hearts	1–2	Dunfermline Athletic	Tynecastle Park
				Attendance: 12,000

== See also ==
- List of Heart of Midlothian F.C. seasons
