= 1935–36 Celtic F.C. season =

Celtic
1935–36 season
- Manager: Willie Maley
- Stadium: Celtic Park
- Scottish First Division: 1st
- Scottish Cup: 2nd round

The 1935–36 Scottish football season was Celtic's 48th season of competitive football, in which they competed in the Scottish First Division and the Scottish Cup.

Celtic had not won the league in the previous nine editions, having seen Rangers win the league five and three times in a row, with a championship for Motherwell in between. However, following a first week defeat in Pittodrie, a strong unbeaten run of 18 matches (16 W, 2 D) from mid-August to mid-December, as well as winning the last eleven league matches in a row, saw them win the league, five points clear of both Rangers and Aberdeen.

It was Celtic's 18th league title, as well as their 32nd major domestic honour.

In the Scottish Cup, they lost in the second round 1-2 to St. Johnstone.

== Competitions ==
=== Scottish First Division ===
==== League table ====
Pos	Team	Pld	W	D	L	GF	GA	GD	Pts
1	Celtic	38	32	2	4	115	33	+82	66
2	Rangers	38	27	7	4	110	43	+67	61
3	Aberdeen	38	26	9	3	96	50	+46	61
4	Motherwell	38	18	12	8	77	58	+19	48
5	Heart of Midlothian	38	20	7	11	88	55	+33	47

Source: RSSSF

==== Matches ====
10 August 1935 Division A	Aberdeen	3–1	Celtic	Aberdeen
				Stadium: Pittodrie Park; Attendance: 28,000

17 August 1935 Division A	Celtic	1–0	Hamilton Academical	Glasgow
				Stadium: Celtic Park; Attendance: 18,000

24 August 1935 Division A	St Johnstone	2–3	Celtic	Perth
				Stadium: Muirton Park; Attendance: 10,000

28 August 1935 Division A	Celtic	6–0	Third Lanark	Glasgow
				Stadium: Celtic Park; Attendance: 20,000

31 August 1936 Division A	Celtic	3–0	Queen's Park	Glasgow
				Stadium: Celtic Park; Attendance: 15,000

7 September 1935 Division A	Queen of the South	1–3	Celtic	Dumfries
				Stadium: Palmerston Park; Attendance: 12,000

14 September 1935 Division A	Celtic	4–0	Albion Rovers	Glasgow
				Stadium: Celtic Park; Attendance: 8,000

16 September 1935 Division A	Celtic	5–3	Dunfermline Athletic	Glasgow
				Stadium: Celtic Park; Attendance: 8,000

21 September 1935 Division A	Rangers	1–2	Celtic	Glasgow
				Stadium: Ibrox Park; Attendance: 72,000

28 September 1935 Division A	Celtic	2–1	Hearts	Glasgow
				Stadium: Celtic Park; Attendance: 18,000

5 October 1935 Division A	Kilmarnock	1–1	Celtic	Kilmarnock
				Stadium: Rugby Park; Attendance: 16,000

19 October 1935 Division A	Celtic	4–0	Airdrieonians	Glasgow
				Stadium: Celtic Park; Attendance: 6,000

26 October 1935 Division A	Motherwell	1–2	Celtic	Motherwell
				Stadium: Fir Park; Attendance: 16,000

2 November 1935 Division A	Celtic	4–2	Dundee	Glasgow
				Stadium: Celtic Park; Attendance: 11,000

9 November 1935 Division A	Hibernian	0–5	Celtic	Edinburgh
				Stadium: Easter Road; Attendance: 15,000

16 November 1935 Division A	Celtic	5–0	Arbroath	Glasgow
				Stadium: Celtic Park; Attendance: 8,000

23 November 1935 Division A	Ayr United	0–2	Celtic	Ayr
				Stadium: Somerset Park; Attendance: 18,000

30 November 1935 Division A	Celtic	1–1	Partick Thistle	Glasgow
				Stadium: Celtic Park; Attendance: 7,000

7 December 1935 Division A	Third Lanark	1–3	Celtic	Glasgow
				Stadium: Cathkin Park; Attendance: 25,000

14 December 1935 Division A	Dunfermline Athletic	1–0	Celtic	Dunfermline
				Stadium: East End Park; Attendance: 6,000

21 December 1935 Division A	Celtic	5–3	Aberdeen	Glasgow
				Stadium: Celtic Park; Attendance: 40,000

28 December 1935 Division A	Hamilton Academical	0–2	Celtic	Hamilton
				Stadium: Douglas Park; Attendance: 6,000

1 January 1936 Division A	Celtic	3–4	Rangers	Glasgow
				Stadium: Celtic Park; Attendance: 65,000

4 January 1936 Division A	Celtic	2–0	St Johnstone	Glasgow
				Stadium: Celtic Park; Attendance: 15,000

11 January 1936 Division A	Celtic	5–0	Queen of the South	Glasgow
				Stadium: Celtic Park; Attendance: 8,000

18 January 1936 Division A	Albion Rovers	0–3	Celtic	Coatbridge
				Stadium: Cliftonhill; Attendance: 11,500

1 February 1936 Division A	Hearts	1–0	Celtic	Edinburgh
				Stadium: Tynecastle Park; Attendance: 30,930

15 February 1936 Division A	Celtic	4–0	Kilmarnock	Glasgow
				Stadium: Celtic Park; Attendance: 6,000

22 February 1936 Division A	Queen's Park	2–3	Celtic	Glasgow
				Stadium: Hampden Park; Attendance: 15,293

29 February 1936 Division A	Clyde	0–4	Celtic	Glasgow
				Stadium: Shawfield Stadium; Attendance: 20,000

7 March 1936 Division A	Airdrieonians	2–3	Celtic	Airdrie
				Stadium: Broomfield Park; Attendance: 7,000

14 March 1936 Division A	Celtic	5–0	Motherwell	Glasgow
				Stadium: Celtic Park; Attendance: 20,000

21 March 1936 Division A	Dundee	0–2	Celtic	Dundee
				Stadium: Dens Park; Attendance: 20,500

28 March 1936 Division A	Celtic	4–1	Hibernian	Glasgow
				Stadium: Celtic Park; Attendance: 20,000

11 April 1936 Division A	Arbroath	0–2	Celtic	Arbroath
				Stadium: Gayfield Park; Attendance: 9,000

13 April 1936 Division A	Celtic	2–1	Clyde	Glasgow
				Stadium: Celtic Park; Attendance: 10,000

18 April 1936 Division A	Celtic	6–0	Ayr United	Glasgow
				Stadium: Celtic Park; Attendance: 12,000

25 April 1936 Division A	Partick Thistle	1–3	Celtic	Glasgow
				Stadium: Firhill Park; Attendance: 10,000

=== Scottish Cup ===
25 January 1936 First round	Celtic	W/O	Berwick Rangers	Glasgow
				Stadium: Celtic Park

8 February 1936 Second round	Celtic	1–2	St Johnstone	Glasgow
				Stadium: Celtic Park; Attendance: 26,647
