= List of UEFA Intertoto Cup winners =

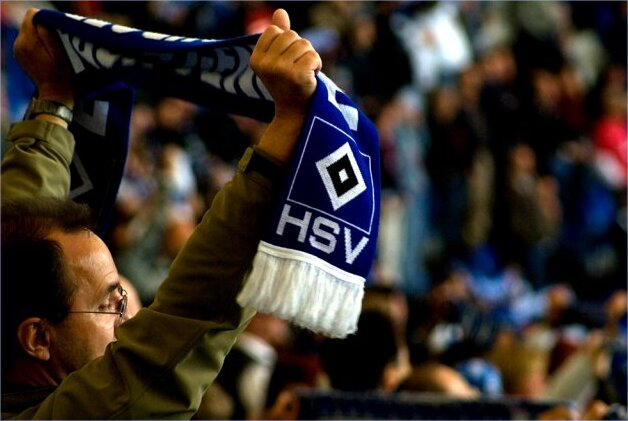
Hamburger SV won the UEFA Intertoto Cup two times, a record jointly held with Schalke 04, VfB Stuttgart and Villarreal.

The UEFA Intertoto Cup was a European association football competition, held during the summer for European clubs that failed to qualify for either the UEFA Champions League or the UEFA Cup. It provided "an alternative qualifying route into the UEFA Cup". The tournament did not come under official UEFA sanction until 1995, and was abolished in 2009.

The first tournament provided two winners, both of whom therefore qualified for the 1995–96 UEFA Cup, with Strasbourg and Bordeaux as the winning teams. From the following season to the 2005 contest, three teams were awarded Intertoto Cups, with French teams being the most successful. In 2006, the format was modified to allow eleven clubs to qualify for the second qualifying round of the UEFA Cup, with the Intertoto Cup being awarded to the team that progressed the furthest in the competition. The competition was originally played over two legs, one at each participating club's stadium.

Hamburger SV, Villarreal, Schalke 04 and VfB Stuttgart hold the record for the most victories, with each team winning the competition twice. The only teams to retain the UEFA Intertoto Cup were Villarreal and Schalke, who both retained the cup in 2004 after winning the previous year. Teams from France won the competition on the most occasions, with twelve winners coming from the country.

== Winners ==
Key
†	Winners/result following extra time
*	Winners following a penalty shoot-out after extra time

UEFA Intertoto Cup winners
Year	Nation	Winners	Score	Runners-up	Nation	Venue
1995	France	Bordeaux	2–0	Karlsruher SC	Germany	Wildparkstadion, Karlsruhe, Germany
1995	France	Bordeaux	2–2	Karlsruher SC	Germany	Parc Lescure, Bordeaux, France
1995	Bordeaux won 4–2 on aggregate					
1995	France	Strasbourg	1–1	Tirol Innsbruck	Austria	Tivoli Neu, Innsbruck, Austria
1995	France	Strasbourg	6–1	Tirol Innsbruck	Austria	Stade de la Meinau, Strasbourg, France
1995	Strasbourg won 7–2 on aggregate					
1996	Germany	Karlsruher SC	0–1	Standard Liège	Belgium	Stade Maurice Dufrasne, Liège, Belgium
1996	Germany	Karlsruher SC	3–1	Standard Liège	Belgium	Wildparkstadion, Karlsruhe, Germany
1996	Karlsruher SC won 3–2 on aggregate					
1996	France	Guingamp	1–2	Rotor Volgograd	Russia	Central Stadium, Volgograd, Russia
1996	France	Guingamp	1–0	Rotor Volgograd	Russia	Stade du Roudourou, Guingamp, France
1996	2–2 on aggregate, Guingamp won on away goals					
1996	Denmark	Silkeborg	2–1	Segesta	Croatia	Gradski Stadion, Sisak, Croatia
1996	Denmark	Silkeborg	0–1	Segesta	Croatia	Silkeborg Stadion, Silkeborg, Denmark
1996	2–2 on aggregate, Silkeborg won on away goals					
1997	France	Auxerre	0–0	MSV Duisburg	Germany	Wedaustadion, Duisburg, Germany
1997	France	Auxerre	2–0	MSV Duisburg	Germany	Stade de l'Abbé-Deschamps, Auxerre, France
1997	Auxerre won 2–0 on aggregate					
1997	France	Bastia	1–0	Halmstads BK	Sweden	Örjans Vall, Halmstad, Sweden
1997	France	Bastia	1–1^{†}	Halmstads BK	Sweden	Stade Armand Cesari, Bastia, France
1997	Bastia won 2–1 on aggregate					
1997	France	Lyon	1–0	Montpellier	France	Stade de la Mosson, Montpellier, France
1997	France	Lyon	3–2	Montpellier	France	Stade Gerland, Lyon, France
1997	Lyon won 4–2 on aggregate					
1998	Spain	Valencia	2–0	Austria Salzburg	Austria	Stadion Lehen, Salzburg, Austria
1998	Spain	Valencia	2–1	Austria Salzburg	Austria	Mestalla, Valencia, Spain
1998	Valencia won 4–1 on aggregate					
1998	Germany	Werder Bremen	1–0	Vojvodina	FR Yugoslavia	Weserstadion, Bremen, Germany
1998	Germany	Werder Bremen	1–1	Vojvodina	FR Yugoslavia	City Stadium, Novi Sad, FR Yugoslavia
1998	Werder Bremen won 2–1 on aggregate					
1998	Italy	Bologna	1–0	Ruch Chorzów	Poland	Stadio Renato Dall'Ara, Bologna, Italy
1998	Italy	Bologna	2–0	Ruch Chorzów	Poland	Stadion Ruchu, Chorzów, Poland
1998	Bologna won 3–0 on aggregate					
1999	France	Montpellier	1–1	Hamburger SV	Germany	Stade de la Mosson, Montpellier, France
1999	France	Montpellier	1–1	Hamburger SV	Germany	Volksparkstadion, Hamburg, Germany
1999	2–2 on aggregate, Montpellier won 3–0 on penalties*					
1999	Italy	Juventus	2–0	Rennes	France	Stadio delle Alpi, Turin, Italy
1999	Italy	Juventus	2–2	Rennes	France	Stade de la Route de Lorient, Rennes, France
1999	Juventus won 4–2 on aggregate					
1999	England	West Ham United	0–1	Metz	France	Upton Park, London, England
1999	England	West Ham United	3–1	Metz	France	Stade Municipal Saint-Symphorien, Metz, France
1999	West Ham United won 3–2 on aggregate					
2000	Italy	Udinese	2–2	Sigma Olomouc	Czech Republic	Andrův stadion, Olomouc, Czech Republic
2000	Italy	Udinese	4–2^{†}	Sigma Olomouc	Czech Republic	Stadio Friuli, Udine, Italy
2000	Udinese won 6–4 on aggregate					
2000	Spain	Celta Vigo	2–1	Zenit Saint Petersburg	Russia	Balaídos, Vigo, Spain
2000	Spain	Celta Vigo	2–2	Zenit Saint Petersburg	Russia	Petrovsky Stadium, Saint Petersburg, Russia
2000	Celta Vigo won 4–3 on aggregate					
2000	Germany	VfB Stuttgart	2–0	Auxerre	France	Stade de l'Abbé-Deschamps, Auxerre, France
2000	Germany	VfB Stuttgart	1–1	Auxerre	France	Neckarstadion, Stuttgart, Germany
2000	VfB Stuttgart won 3–1 on aggregate					
2001	England	Aston Villa	1–1	Basel	Switzerland	St. Jakob-Park, Basel, Switzerland
2001	England	Aston Villa	4–1	Basel	Switzerland	Villa Park, Birmingham, England
2001	Aston Villa won 5–2 on aggregate					
2001	France	Paris Saint-Germain	0–0	Brescia	Italy	Parc des Princes, Paris, France
2001	France	Paris Saint-Germain	1–1	Brescia	Italy	Stadio Mario Rigamonti, Brescia, Italy
2001	1–1 on aggregate, Paris Saint-Germain won on away goals					
2001	France	Troyes	0–0	Newcastle United	England	Stade de l'Aube, Troyes, France
2001	France	Troyes	4–4	Newcastle United	England	St James' Park, Newcastle upon Tyne, England
2001	4–4 on aggregate, Troyes won on away goals					
2002	Spain	Málaga	1–0	Villarreal	Spain	El Madrigal, Villarreal, Spain
2002	Spain	Málaga	1–1	Villarreal	Spain	Estadio La Rosaleda, Málaga, Spain
2002	Málaga won 2–1 on aggregate					
2002	England	Fulham	2–2	Bologna	Italy	Stadio Renato Dall'Ara, Bologna, Italy
2002	England	Fulham	3–1	Bologna	Italy	Loftus Road, London, England
2002	Fulham won 5–3 on aggregate					
2002	Germany	VfB Stuttgart	0–1	Lille	France	Stade Grimonprez Jooris, Lille, France
2002	Germany	VfB Stuttgart	2–0	Lille	France	Neckarstadion, Stuttgart, Germany
2002	VfB Stuttgart won 2–1 on aggregate					
2003	Germany	Schalke 04	2–0	Pasching	Austria	Waldstadion, Pasching, Austria
2003	Germany	Schalke 04	0–0	Pasching	Austria	Arena AufSchalke, Gelsenkirchen, Germany
2003	Schalke 04 won 2–0 on aggregate					
2003	Spain	Villarreal	2–1	Heerenveen	Netherlands	Abe Lenstra Stadion, Heerenveen, Netherlands
2003	Spain	Villarreal	0–0	Heerenveen	Netherlands	El Madrigal, Villarreal, Spain
2003	Villarreal won 2–1 on aggregate					
2003	Italy	Perugia	1–0	VfL Wolfsburg	Germany	Stadio Renato Curi, Perugia, Italy
2003	Italy	Perugia	2–0	VfL Wolfsburg	Germany	Volkswagen Arena, Wolfsburg, Germany
2003	Perugia won 3–0 on aggregate					
2004	France	Lille	0–0	Leiria	Portugal	Stadium Lille-Metropole, Lille, France
2004	France	Lille	2–0^{†}	Leiria	Portugal	Estádio Dr. Magalhães Pessoa, Leiria, Portugal
2004	Lille won 2–0 on aggregate					
2004	Germany	Schalke 04	2–1	Slovan Liberec	Czech Republic	Arena AufSchalke, Gelsenkirchen, Germany
2004	Germany	Schalke 04	1–0	Slovan Liberec	Czech Republic	U Nisy Stadium, Liberec, Czech Republic
2004	Schalke 04 won 3–1 on aggregate					
2004	Spain	Villarreal	2–0	Atlético Madrid	Spain	El Madrigal, Villarreal, Spain
2004	Spain	Villarreal	0–2	Atlético Madrid	Spain	Vicente Calderón, Madrid, Spain
2004	2–2 on aggregate, Villarreal won 3–1 on penalties*					
2005	France	Lens	1–1	CFR Cluj	Romania	Stadionul Dr. Constantin Rădulescu, Cluj-Napoca, Romania
2005	France	Lens	3–1	CFR Cluj	Romania	Stade Félix-Bollaert, Lens, France
2005	Lens won 4–2 on aggregate					
2005	France	Marseille	0–2	Deportivo La Coruña	Spain	Riazor, A Coruña, Spain
2005	France	Marseille	5–1	Deportivo La Coruña	Spain	Stade Vélodrome, Marseille, France
2005	Marseille won 5–3 on aggregate					
2005	Germany	Hamburger SV	1–0	Valencia	Spain	HSH Nordbank Arena, Hamburg, Germany
2005	Germany	Hamburger SV	0–0	Valencia	Spain	Mestalla, Valencia, Spain
2005	Hamburger SV won 1–0 on aggregate					
2006 (Note: Newcastle United won the 2006 UEFA Intertoto Cup, after progressing the furthest out of the eleven teams that qualified for the 2006–07 UEFA Cup via the UEFA Intertoto Cup. The match shown represents the final match in the Intertoto Cup.)	England	Newcastle United	1–1	Lillestrøm	Norway	St James' Park, Newcastle upon Tyne, England
2006	England	Newcastle United	3–0	Lillestrøm	Norway	Åråsen stadion, Lillestrøm, Norway
2006	Newcastle United won 4–1 on aggregate					
2007 (Note: Hamburger SV won the 2007 UEFA Intertoto Cup, after progressing the furthest out of the eleven teams that qualified for the 2007–08 UEFA Cup via the UEFA Intertoto Cup. The match shown represents their final match in the Intertoto Cup.)	Germany	Hamburger SV	1–1	Dacia Chișinău	Moldova	Stadionul Republican, Chişinău, Moldova
2007	Germany	Hamburger SV	4–0	Dacia Chișinău	Moldova	HSH Nordbank Arena, Hamburg, Germany
2007	Hamburger SV won 5–1 on aggregate					
2008 (Note: Braga won the 2008 UEFA Intertoto Cup, after progressing the furthest out of the eleven teams that qualified for the 2008–09 UEFA Cup via the UEFA Intertoto Cup. The match shown represents their final match in the Intertoto Cup.)	Portugal	Braga	2–0	Sivasspor	Turkey	4 Eylül, Sivas, Turkey
2008	Portugal	Braga	3–0	Sivasspor	Turkey	Estádio Municipal de Braga, Braga, Portugal
2008	Braga won 5–0 on aggregate					

== Performances ==
=== By club ===
Performance by club (Note: Does not count the teams that lost to the winners from 2006 to 2008, as the champions were determined by the team that progressed the furthest.)
Club	Titles	Runners-up	Years won	Years runner-up
(Spain) Villarreal	2	1	2003, 2004	2002
(Germany) Hamburger SV	2	1	2005, 2007	1999
(Germany) VfB Stuttgart	2	0	2000, 2002	—
(Germany) Schalke 04	2	0	2003, 2004	—
(Germany) Karlsruher SC	1	1	1996	1995
(France) Auxerre	1	1	1997	2000
(Italy) Bologna	1	1	1998	2002
(Spain) Valencia	1	1	1998	2005
(France) Montpellier	1	1	1999	1997
(France) Lille	1	1	2004	2002
(England) Newcastle United	1	1	2006	2001
(France) Bordeaux	1	0	1995	—
(France) Strasbourg	1	0	1995	—
(France) Guingamp	1	0	1996	—
(Denmark) Silkeborg	1	0	1996	—
(France) Bastia	1	0	1997	—
(France) Lyon	1	0	1997	—
(Germany) Werder Bremen	1	0	1998	—
(Italy) Juventus	1	0	1999	—
(England) West Ham United	1	0	1999	—
(Spain) Celta Vigo	1	0	2000	—
(Italy) Udinese	1	0	2000	—
(England) Aston Villa	1	0	2001	—
(France) Paris Saint-Germain	1	0	2001	—
(France) Troyes	1	0	2001	—
(England) Fulham	1	0	2002	—
(Spain) Málaga	1	0	2002	—
(Italy) Perugia	1	0	2003	—
(France) Lens	1	0	2005	—
(France) Marseille	1	0	2005	—
(Portugal) Braga	1	0	2008	—
(Austria) Tirol Innsbruck	0	1	—	1995
(Russia) Rotor Volgograd	0	1	—	1996
(Croatia) Segesta	0	1	—	1996
(Belgium) Standard Liège	0	1	—	1996
(Germany) MSV Duisburg	0	1	—	1997
(Sweden) Halmstads BK	0	1	—	1997
Austria Salzburg	0	1	—	1998
(Poland) Ruch Chorzów	0	1	—	1998
(Federal Republic of Yugoslavia) Vojvodina	0	1	—	1998
(France) Metz	0	1	—	1999
(France) Rennes	0	1	—	1999
(Czech Republic) Sigma Olomouc	0	1	—	2000
(Russia) Zenit Saint Petersburg	0	1	—	2000
(Switzerland) Basel	0	1	—	2001
(Italy) Brescia	0	1	—	2001
(Austria) Pasching	0	1	—	2003
(Netherlands) Heerenveen	0	1	—	2003
(Germany) VfL Wolfsburg	0	1	—	2003
(Spain) Atlético Madrid	0	1	—	2004
(Portugal) Leiria	0	1	—	2004
(Czech Republic) Slovan Liberec	0	1	—	2004
(Romania) CFR Cluj	0	1	—	2005
(Spain) Deportivo La Coruña	0	1	—	2005

=== By nation ===
Performance by nation (Note: Does not count the teams that lost to the winners from 2006 to 2008, as the champions were determined by the team that progressed the furthest.)
Nation	Titles	Runners-up
France	12	5
Germany	8	4
Spain	5	4
Italy	4	2
England	4	1
Portugal	1	1
Denmark	1	0
Austria	0	3
Czech Republic	0	2
Russia	0	2
Belgium	0	1
Croatia	0	1
FR Yugoslavia (Note: The FR Yugoslavia final appearance was by a club from the Republic of Serbia)	0	1
Netherlands	0	1
Poland	0	1
Romania	0	1
Sweden	0	1
Switzerland	0	1

== See also ==
- List of UEFA Intertoto Cup winning managers
- List of UEFA Cup and Europa League finals
