= 1935–36 Scottish Division One =

37th season of top-tier football league in Scotland

Scottish Division One
- Season: 1935–36
- Champions: Celtic
- Relegated: Airdrieonians; Ayr United

The 1935–36 Scottish Division One season was won by Celtic by five points over city rival Rangers. Airdrieonians and Ayr United finished 19th and 20th respectively and were relegated to the 1936–37 Scottish Division Two.

== League table ==
Pos	Team	Pld	W	D	L	GF	GA	GD	Pts
1	Celtic	38	32	2	4	115	33	+82	66
2	Rangers	38	27	7	4	110	43	+67	61
3	Aberdeen	38	26	9	3	96	50	+46	61
4	Motherwell	38	18	12	8	77	58	+19	48
5	Heart of Midlothian	38	20	7	11	88	55	+33	47
6	Hamilton Academical	38	15	7	16	77	74	+3	37
7	St Johnstone	38	15	7	16	70	81	−11	37
8	Kilmarnock	38	14	7	17	69	64	+5	35
9	Third Lanark	38	15	5	18	63	65	−2	35
10	Partick Thistle	38	12	10	16	64	72	−8	34
11	Arbroath	38	11	11	16	46	69	−23	33
12	Dundee	38	11	10	17	67	80	−13	32
13	Queen's Park	38	11	10	17	58	75	−17	32
14	Dunfermline Athletic	38	12	8	18	67	92	−25	32
15	Queen of the South	38	11	9	18	54	72	−18	31
16	Albion Rovers	38	13	4	21	69	92	−23	30
17	Hibernian	38	11	7	20	56	82	−26	29
18	Clyde	38	10	8	20	63	84	−21	28
19	Airdrieonians	38	9	9	20	68	91	−23	27
20	Ayr United	38	11	3	24	53	98	−45	25

Source: RSSSF

== Results ==
Home \ Away	ABE	AIR	ALB	ARB	AYR	CEL	CLY	DND	DNF	HAM	HOM	HIB	KIL	MOT	PAR	QOS	QPA	RAN	STJ	THI
Aberdeen		2–2	6–1	1–2	3–0	3–1	3–1	4–1	3–3	3–0	2–1	3–1	2–1	1–1	4–0	4–3	2–1	1–0	3–0	2–0
Airdrieonians	3–4		1–2	3–3	3–0	2–3	5–3	2–0	6–2	2–4	3–1	3–2	1–4	1–1	3–0	1–0	1–1	0–2	3–3	1–2
Albion Rovers	1–3	4–1		5–2	5–1	0–3	4–4	1–1	1–3	4–0	1–2	0–1	2–3	0–2	5–2	2–0	2–1	1–2	1–2	2–0
Arbroath	0–1	1–1	1–2		3–1	0–2	2–1	1–0	2–1	0–1	1–3	3–2	0–0	1–1	1–1	3–1	0–1	0–0	2–2	1–3
Ayr United	1–1	3–1	4–1	0–2		0–2	4–3	1–2	1–2	1–0	1–3	3–0	1–3	1–0	3–1	1–3	1–0	2–2	1–2	1–3
Celtic	5–3	4–0	4–0	5–0	6–0		2–1	4–2	5–3	1–0	2–1	4–1	4–0	5–0	1–1	5–0	3–0	3–4	2–0	6–0
Clyde	0–3	1–1	5–2	1–3	2–0	0–4		2–1	4–2	1–2	1–0	7–4	1–0	1–2	1–0	3–0	1–3	1–4	3–1	0–1
Dundee	2–2	1–0	2–0	3–0	6–1	0–2	4–3		2–3	3–0	2–5	2–1	0–0	2–2	3–3	1–1	6–4	0–3	0–2	3–2
Dunfermline Athletic	0–2	2–0	5–5	1–2	2–1	1–0	1–1	2–2		2–2	2–0	0–1	0–1	1–3	1–1	4–1	2–2	2–6	2–6	1–0
Hamilton Academical	2–3	3–1	7–2	2–2	4–2	0–2	0–0	2–2	6–1		3–4	2–3	3–2	3–3	5–1	3–1	4–1	1–0	5–1	1–0
Heart of Midlothian	1–2	3–0	4–2	2–1	3–0	1–0	3–3	3–0	1–1	4–1		8–3	4–2	2–2	2–0	2–0	4–1	1–1	6–1	2–0
Hibernian	1–4	2–3	3–0	0–2	0–1	0–5	1–1	2–1	2–3	3–2	1–1		3–1	2–3	2–0	3–0	0–1	1–1	0–2	3–0
Kilmarnock	2–5	2–2	2–2	5–0	7–2	1–1	2–0	4–1	1–2	4–3	2–0	0–1		2–3	2–1	4–2	1–1	0–3	4–1	1–0
Motherwell	2–2	6–2	2–0	4–0	4–1	1–2	1–1	3–0	2–3	2–1	4–2	1–1	3–2		5–3	0–2	1–0	0–2	3–0	2–1
Partick Thistle	3–3	3–1	5–3	1–1	2–2	1–3	4–1	1–1	2–0	3–0	1–0	2–1	2–0	4–1		2–1	7–0	1–3	3–1	0–0
Queen of the South	1–1	3–3	1–0	3–2	2–1	1–3	2–2	3–4	3–1	1–2	2–0	1–1	2–1	1–1	1–0		4–0	0–2	1–1	2–1
Queen's Park	0–1	3–2	0–1	0–0	1–2	2–3	4–1	3–2	2–1	1–1	2–2	6–1	1–0	2–2	1–1	1–1		1–3	5–1	1–0
Rangers	2–3	5–3	5–1	6–0	6–1	1–2	4–1	4–3	6–2	3–1	1–1	3–0	2–1	0–0	3–1	2–1	3–3		7–0	4–2
St Johnstone	0–0	4–1	2–3	2–1	2–3	2–3	2–1	2–0	4–2	1–1	3–1	2–2	0–0	2–3	3–0	3–1	5–2	1–2		3–1
Third Lanark	5–1	2–0	0–1	1–1	6–4	1–3	3–0	2–2	3–1	4–0	1–5	1–1	3–2	2–1	4–1	2–2	3–0	1–3	3–1	

Legend: Blue = home team win; Yellow = draw; Red = away team win.
