= 1926–27 Scottish Division One =

28th season of top-tier football league in Scotland

Scottish Division One
- Season: 1926–27
- Champions: Rangers
- Relegated: Dundee United; Morton

The 1926–27 Scottish Division One season was won by Rangers by five points over nearest rival Motherwell. Dundee United and Morton finished 19th and 20th respectively and were relegated to the 1927–28 Scottish Division Two.

== League table ==
Pos	Team	Pld	W	D	L	GF	GA	GD	Pts
1	Rangers	38	23	10	5	85	41	+44	56
2	Motherwell	38	23	5	10	81	52	+29	51
3	Celtic	38	21	7	10	101	55	+46	49
4	Airdrieonians	38	18	9	11	97	64	+33	45
5	Dundee	38	17	9	12	77	51	+26	43
6	Falkirk	38	15	12	11	77	60	+17	42
7	Cowdenbeath	38	18	6	14	74	60	+14	42
8	Aberdeen	38	13	14	11	73	72	+1	40
9	Hibernian	38	16	7	15	62	71	−9	39
10	St Mirren	38	16	5	17	78	76	+2	37
11	Partick Thistle	38	15	6	17	89	74	+15	36
12	Queen's Park	38	15	6	17	74	84	−10	36
13	Heart of Midlothian	38	12	11	15	65	64	+1	35
14	St Johnstone	38	13	9	16	55	69	−14	35
15	Hamilton Academical	38	13	9	16	60	85	−25	35
16	Kilmarnock	38	12	8	18	54	71	−17	32
17	Clyde	38	10	9	19	54	85	−31	29
18	Dunfermline Athletic	38	10	8	20	53	85	−32	28
19	Morton	38	12	4	22	56	101	−45	28
20	Dundee United	38	7	8	23	56	101	−45	22

Source: "1926-1927 Division 1 - SPFL Archive". SPFL.

== Results ==
Home \ Away	ABE	AIR	CEL	CLY	COW	DND	DNU	DNF	FAL	HAM	HOM	HIB	KIL	MOR	MOT	PAR	QPA	RAN	STJ	STM
Aberdeen		1–1	0–0	5–2	0–0	2–1	2–2	3–1	3–0	3–3	6–5	2–5	5–1	6–1	2–0	1–4	2–0	2–2	3–1	1–0
Airdrieonians	2–1		2–2	1–1	5–2	3–1	7–2	6–2	2–1	7–1	0–0	3–0	2–0	4–0	1–3	3–1	5–0	3–3	6–1	2–2
Celtic	6–2	2–1		7–0	2–0	0–0	7–2	2–1	3–1	2–2	1–0	2–3	4–0	3–0	3–2	2–1	2–3	0–1	4–0	6–2
Clyde	5–1	2–1	2–2		0–2	2–2	1–0	1–1	2–1	0–0	2–3	2–0	1–1	6–0	1–4	0–5	5–0	0–0	1–1	1–2
Cowdenbeath	0–0	6–0	2–1	1–0		0–1	4–1	1–2	3–2	5–1	2–1	2–0	3–1	3–2	1–1	1–2	1–1	1–0	0–1	5–1
Dundee	1–1	1–0	1–2	1–2	1–2		5–0	1–1	2–3	1–0	4–1	3–0	1–2	6–1	3–1	4–2	3–0	1–1	4–1	2–1
Dundee United	2–2	2–4	3–3	3–1	0–2	1–0		4–4	0–2	1–2	5–3	0–2	1–2	0–0	0–1	2–1	2–2	2–0	1–2	2–1
Dunfermline Athletic	1–0	0–2	0–6	3–1	0–3	4–3	2–0		0–1	0–1	0–2	4–2	2–3	1–1	0–4	1–1	3–3	1–3	4–0	3–1
Falkirk	1–1	2–1	4–1	3–3	2–2	3–1	5–3	2–0		8–2	2–1	2–0	0–1	6–1	1–1	1–1	6–0	3–3	4–0	1–1
Hamilton Academical	2–0	4–2	3–3	4–2	4–2	1–4	1–1	2–2	3–1		2–1	0–1	2–0	1–1	0–3	0–2	1–5	1–1	1–4	2–3
Heart of Midlothian	2–2	1–3	3–0	5–0	4–3	0–0	1–2	1–2	0–0	1–1		2–2	1–1	3–0	1–3	1–0	4–1	0–2	0–0	4–3
Hibernian	2–3	2–1	3–2	3–0	2–0	0–1	3–2	2–2	1–0	3–1	2–2		5–1	1–1	1–1	3–2	2–0	2–2	1–5	2–1
Kilmarnock	0–0	4–2	2–3	4–1	1–4	3–2	3–0	2–3	1–1	0–1	1–4	4–0		2–0	1–4	2–0	2–2	0–0	2–0	2–2
Morton	3–4	2–1	2–6	0–2	3–2	3–1	3–1	3–0	4–1	3–0	1–3	3–0	3–2		0–3	3–0	2–0	2–8	0–2	0–2
Motherwell	1–0	1–5	0–1	2–0	0–0	2–5	6–0	2–1	3–3	3–1	5–1	2–1	1–0	6–0		3–1	2–1	1–4	5–2	1–0
Partick Thistle	4–0	5–1	0–3	3–0	5–3	3–3	2–2	5–1	0–1	2–3	2–2	5–1	5–0	4–5	3–0		1–7	1–4	3–1	5–2
Queen's Park	1–1	3–3	1–6	4–0	3–1	1–4	5–3	4–1	1–2	4–0	2–0	3–4	1–0	2–1	1–2	4–3		1–2	5–2	1–0
Rangers	3–2	1–1	2–1	6–0	4–1	0–0	2–0	2–0	2–1	1–4	1–0	2–0	1–0	2–1	2–0	2–1	0–1		4–2	4–0
St Johnstone	1–1	1–1	1–0	1–3	1–3	0–1	4–1	1–0	4–0	3–2	1–1	0–0	3–3	4–0	0–1	1–1	1–0	2–1		0–0
St Mirren	6–3	1–3	3–1	3–2	5–1	2–2	4–3	4–0	3–0	0–1	0–1	3–1	1–0	3–1	5–1	1–3	5–1	3–7	2–1	

Legend: Blue = home team win; Yellow = draw; Red = away team win.
