= UEFA club competition records and statistics =

== Clubs ==
=== UEFA club competition winners ===
Real Madrid hold the record for the most overall titles (26), and have the most UEFA Super Cup wins (6) as well. The Madrid club also have a record 15 titles achieved in the UEFA Champions League and its predecessor. Barcelona have a record four titles in the Cup Winners' Cup, while Sevilla have a record of seven UEFA Cup and Europa League titles. Roma, West Ham United, Olympiacos, Chelsea and Crystal Palace have each won one UEFA Conference League title. Finally, German clubs Hamburger SV, Schalke 04, and VfB Stuttgart, as well as Spanish club Villarreal, are the record holders by titles won in the UEFA Intertoto Cup (two each).

=== Winning sides by winning percentage ===
These are UEFA club competition title winners (Note: Champions League (named European Cup until 1992), Cup Winners' Cup (1960–1999), and Europa League (named UEFA Cup until 2009); since 2021 also includes Conference League (named Europa Conference League until 2024).) with at least 80% winning rate during their triumphant season. Qualifying and preliminary round matches are not included, neither are play-off matches; results of penalty shoot-outs are considered the score which preceded them (including extra time).

As of the end of the 2025–26 season, Bayern Munich are the only team to finish a continental competition with a 100% winning record, achieving that milestone in 2020 as part of a modified tournament structure with a final eight in a neutral venue held in a single elimination match due to the COVID-19 pandemic in Europe.

Table key

Highest ranked European Cup / UEFA Champions League winner
Highest ranked European / UEFA Cup Winners' Cup winner
Highest ranked UEFA Cup / UEFA Europa League winner
Highest ranked UEFA Europa Conference League / UEFA Conference League winner

Rank	Club	Tournament	Season	Pld	W	GF	GA	GD	Win %
1	(Germany) Bayern Munich	Champions League	2019–20	11	11	43	8	+35	100.00%
2	(England) Chelsea	Conference League	2024–25	13	12	42	10	+32	92.31%
2	(England) West Ham United	Europa Conference League	2022–23	13	12	29	8	+21	92.31%
4	(Soviet Union) Dynamo Kyiv	Cup Winners' Cup	1974–75	9	8	17	5	+12	88.88%
4	(France) Paris Saint-Germain	Cup Winners' Cup	1995–96	9	8	16	4	+12	88.88%
6	(Spain) Atlético Madrid	Europa League	2011–12	15	13	33	10	+23	86.67%
6	(England) Aston Villa	Europa League	2025–26	15	13	31	8	+23	86.67%
8	(Spain) Real Madrid	European Cup	1959–60	7	6	31	10	+21	85.71%
8	(England) Tottenham Hotspur	Cup Winners' Cup	1962–63	7	6	24	9	+15	85.71%
8	(Netherlands) Ajax	European Cup	1972–73	7	6	15	4	+11	85.71%
8	(Italy) Inter Milan	European Cup	1963–64	7	6	15	5	+10	85.71%
12	(Spain) Real Madrid	Champions League	2013–14	13	11	41	10	+31	84.61%
12	(Spain) Barcelona	Champions League	2014–15	13	11	31	11	+20	84.61%
14	(Italy) Juventus	UEFA Cup	1992–93	12	10	31	6	+25	83.33%
14	(Germany) Borussia Mönchengladbach	UEFA Cup	1974–75	12	10	32	9	+23	83.33%
14	(Germany) Bayern Munich	UEFA Cup	1995–96	12	10	32	10	+22	83.33%
14	(Italy) Fiorentina	Cup Winners' Cup	1960–61	6	5	17	5	+12	83.33%
18	(Germany) Borussia Dortmund	Champions League	1996–97	11	9	23	10	+13	81.81%
19	(England) Chelsea	Europa League	2018–19	15	12	36	10	+26	80.00%
19	(Portugal) Porto	Europa League	2010–11	15	12	37	14	+23	80.00%
19	(Spain) Villarreal	Europa League	2020–21	15	12	31	9	+22	80.00%

=== List of teams to have won the main European club competitions ===
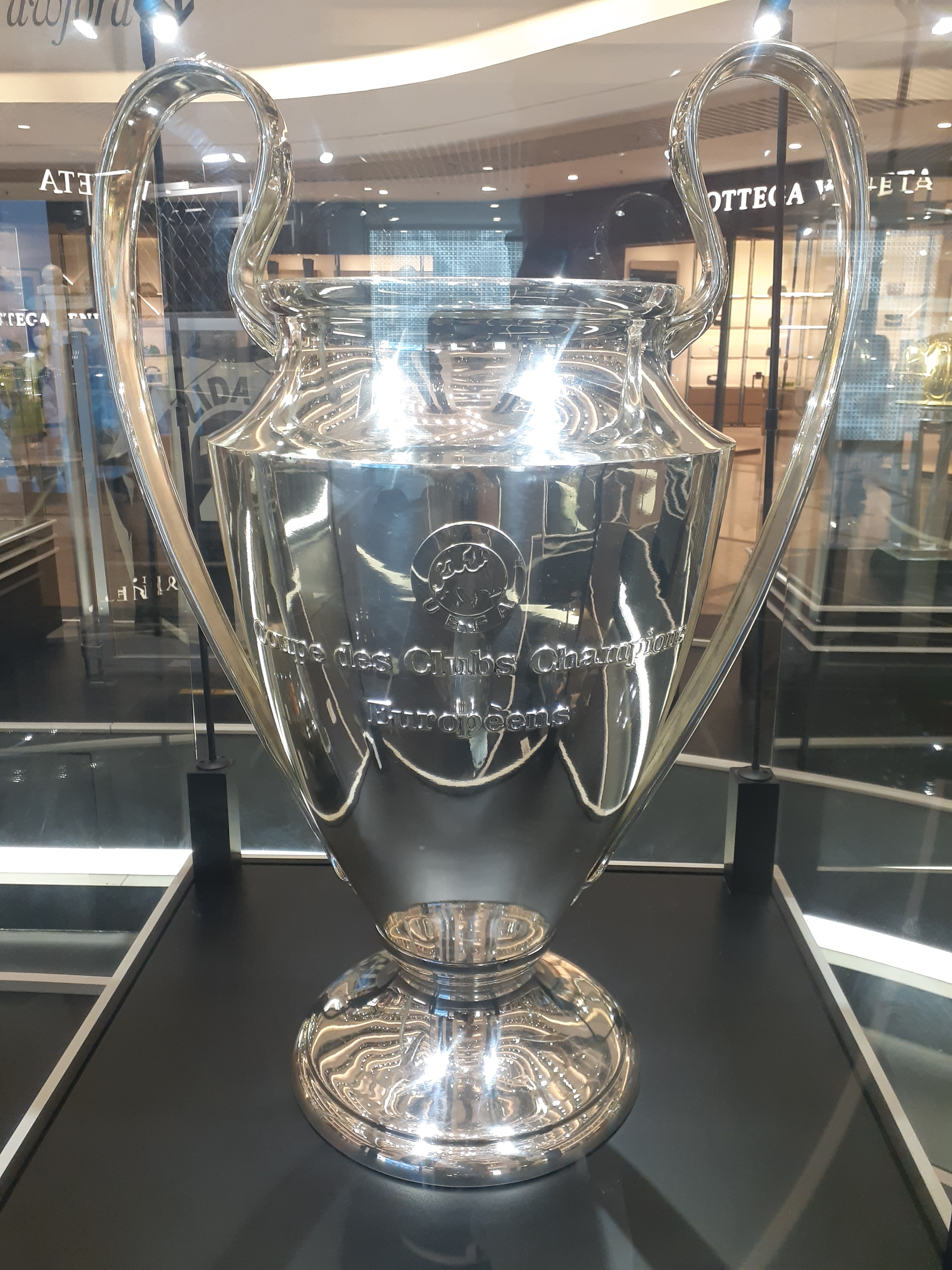
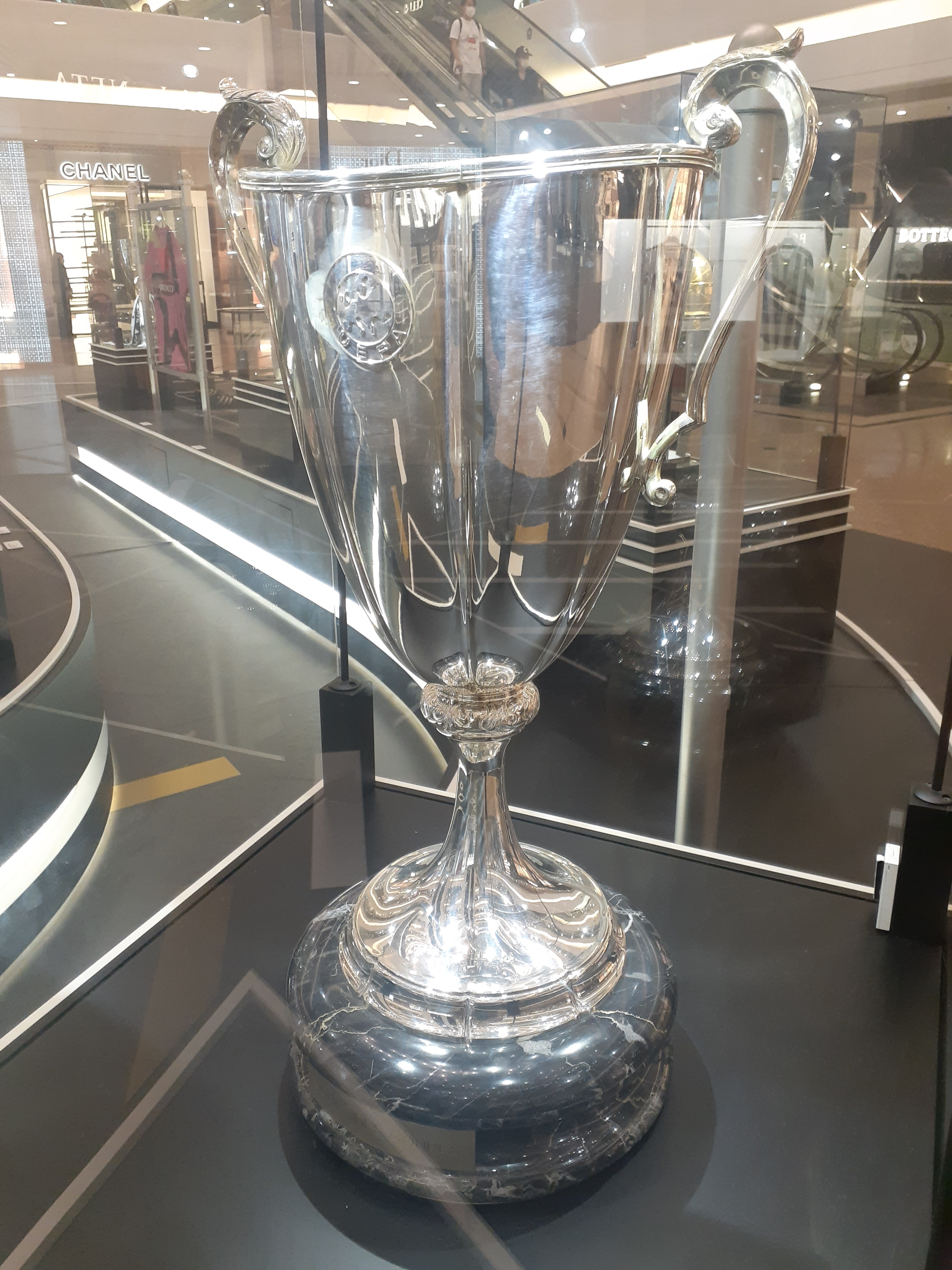
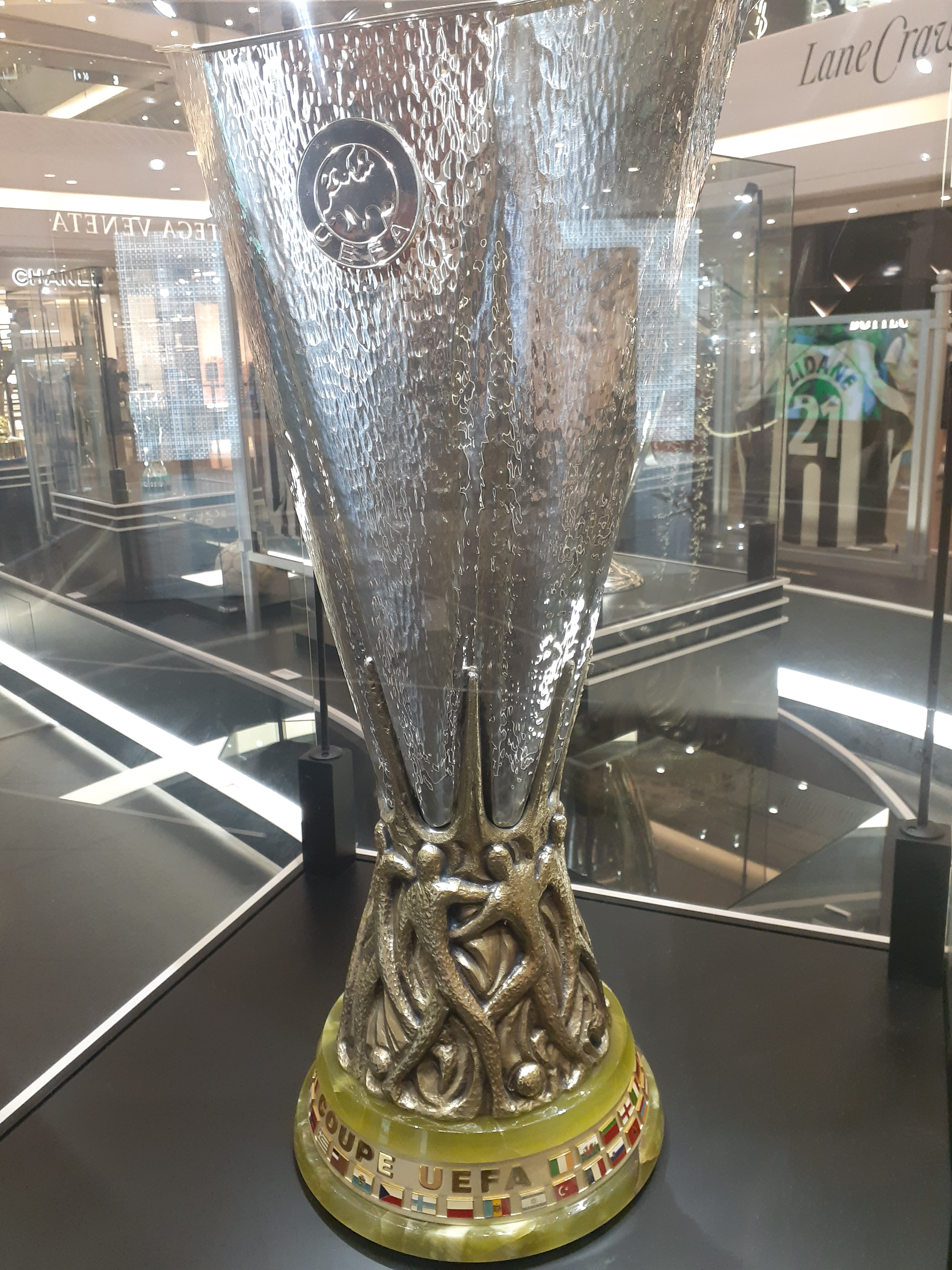
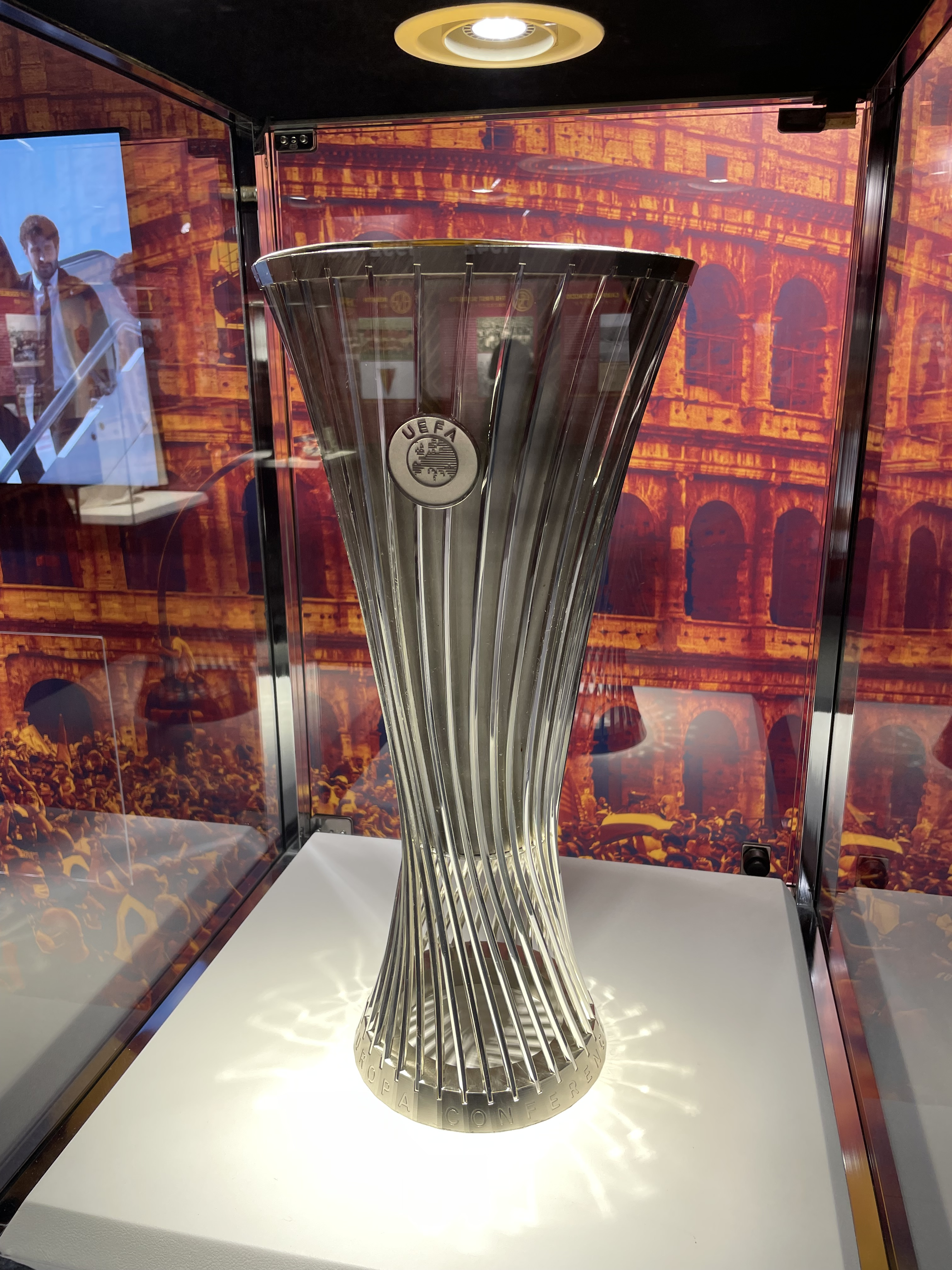
From left to right: The Champions League, the Cup Winners' Cup, the Europa League and the Conference League trophies, with the first three comprising the original European Treble pictured in 2021

In 2025, Chelsea became the first club to have won all four UEFA main club competitions; the European Cup/UEFA Champions League, the European/UEFA Cup Winners' Cup, the UEFA Cup/UEFA Europa League, and the UEFA Europa Conference League/UEFA Conference League. They are also the only club to have won all three pre-1999 main UEFA club competitions more than once each, having won the Cup Winners' Cup in 1970–71 and 1997–98, the Europa League in 2012–13 and 2018–19, and the Champions League in 2011–12 and 2020–21. (Note: Chelsea has also won the UEFA Super Cup twice, in 1998 and 2021.)

Club	First title	Second title	Third title	Fourth title
(England) Chelsea	1970–71 European Cup Winners' Cup	2011–12 UEFA Champions League	2012–13 UEFA Europa League	2024–25 UEFA Conference League

Only the first win is shown for any club with multiple wins of the same competition.

Four other clubs have also won the three main pre-1999 UEFA club competitions, the "European Treble" of European Cup/UEFA Champions League, European/UEFA Cup Winners' Cup, and UEFA Cup/UEFA Europa League.

Club	First title	Second title	Treble title
(Italy) Juventus	1976–77 UEFA Cup	1983–84 European Cup Winners' Cup	1984–85 European Cup
(Netherlands) Ajax	1970–71 European Cup	1986–87 European Cup Winners' Cup	1991–92 UEFA Cup
(Germany) Bayern Munich	1966–67 European Cup Winners' Cup	1973–74 European Cup	1995–96 UEFA Cup
(England) Manchester United	1967–68 European Cup	1990–91 European Cup Winners' Cup	2016–17 UEFA Europa League

Only the first win is shown for any club with multiple wins of the same competition.

Although the Cup Winners' Cup no longer exists, 27 of its former winners could still add wins in the other two competitions to achieve the original European treble. Eleven of those teams are just one trophy away from the feat, including Barcelona and Milan who have both won multiple Champions League and Cup Winners' Cup titles and are one Europa League trophy away from achieving such feat. Other clubs needing the Europa League title to achieve the treble are Hamburg, Borussia Dortmund, Manchester City, and Paris Saint-Germain, having previously won the European Cup and the Cup Winners' Cup once each. The remaining five clubs need to win the Champions League; Atlético Madrid, Tottenham Hotspur, Anderlecht, Valencia, and Parma.

There is a chance for the 31 other former winners of the Cup Winners' Cup to win the Europa League and the Conference League to win all four trophies. Any other existing clubs can also win a modern UEFA treble (counting only the Champions, Europa, and Conference League titles) in the future.

Juventus received The UEFA Plaque from the confederation in 1988, in recognition of being the first side in European football history to win all three major UEFA club competitions, and the only one to reach it with in a single coach spell (i.e. Giovanni Trapattoni). They completed the European treble in the shortest amount of time (eight years), while Manchester United reached it in the longest (49 years).

Hamburg, Fiorentina, Ajax, Arsenal, and Liverpool are the only clubs to have been runners-up in all three of these competitions. After the inception of the Conference League in the 2021–22 season, Fiorentina became the first club to lose a final in all four European seasonal competitions, suffered after losing the 2023 Europa Conference League final.

=== List of teams to have won all pre-1999 UEFA club competitions ===
Until the first Conference League final in 2022, Juventus was the only club in association football history to have won every men's official confederation tournaments.

Club	First title	Second title	Third title	Fourth title	Fifth title	Sixth title
(Italy) Juventus	1976–77 UEFA Cup	1983–84 European Cup Winners' Cup	1984 European Super Cup	1984–85 European Cup	1985 Intercontinental Cup	1999 UEFA Intertoto Cup

Shows first win only in the case of club's multiple wins of same competition.

German side Hamburg was the only club to have been runners-up in all six UEFA club competitions played until 2021. The club lost the European Cup Winners' Cup final in 1968, the European Super Cup in 1977 and 1983, the European Cup final in 1980, the UEFA Cup final in 1982, the Intercontinental Cup in 1983, and the finals of the UEFA Intertoto Cup in 1999.

=== All winners from one country ===
Before the abolition of the Cup Winners' Cup in 1999 and after the commencement of the Conference League in 2021, only once have three clubs from the same country – Italy in 1989–90 – won all three main UEFA club competitions in the same season. In between, clubs from the same country have won both remaining main UEFA club competitions (Champions League and Europa League) in the same season six times: two Spanish teams in 2005–06, 2013–14, 2014–15, 2015–16, and 2017–18, and two English teams in 2018–19.

Season	Competition	Winners
1989–90	European Cup	(Italy) Milan
1989–90	European Cup Winners' Cup	(Italy) Sampdoria
1989–90	UEFA Cup	(Italy) Juventus
2005–06	UEFA Champions League	(Spain) Barcelona
2005–06	UEFA Cup	(Spain) Sevilla
2013–14	UEFA Champions League	(Spain) Real Madrid
2013–14	UEFA Europa League	(Spain) Sevilla
2014–15	UEFA Champions League	(Spain) Barcelona
2014–15	UEFA Europa League	(Spain) Sevilla
2015–16	UEFA Champions League	(Spain) Real Madrid
2015–16	UEFA Europa League	(Spain) Sevilla
2017–18	UEFA Champions League	(Spain) Real Madrid
2017–18	UEFA Europa League	(Spain) Atlético Madrid
2018–19	UEFA Champions League	(England) Liverpool
2018–19	UEFA Europa League	(England) Chelsea

=== All runners-up from one association ===
In 2022–23 season, for the first time in European football history, three different teams from the same association (Italian FIGC) lost in all three UEFA competitions: Inter Milan lost the Champions League final, Roma lost the Europa League final and Fiorentina lost the Europa Conference League final, respectively.

Season	Competition	Winners	Runners-up
2000–01	UEFA Champions League	(Germany) Bayern Munich	(Spain) Valencia
2000–01	UEFA Cup	(England) Liverpool	(Spain) Alavés
2001–02	UEFA Champions League	(Spain) Real Madrid	(Germany) Bayer Leverkusen
2001–02	UEFA Cup	(Netherlands) Feyenoord	(Germany) Borussia Dortmund
2003–04	UEFA Champions League	(Portugal) Porto	(France) Monaco (Note: Monaco is a club from the sovereign state of Monaco but is playing in the French football league system.)
2003–04	UEFA Cup	(Spain) Valencia	(France) Marseille
2005–06	UEFA Champions League	(Spain) Barcelona	(England) Arsenal
2005–06	UEFA Cup	(Spain) Sevilla	(England) Middlesbrough
2018–19	UEFA Champions League	(England) Liverpool	(England) Tottenham Hotspur
2018–19	UEFA Europa League	(England) Chelsea	(England) Arsenal
2020–21	UEFA Champions League	(England) Chelsea	(England) Manchester City
2020–21	UEFA Europa League	(Spain) Villarreal	(England) Manchester United
2022–23	UEFA Champions League	(England) Manchester City	(Italy) Inter Milan
2022–23	UEFA Europa League	(Spain) Sevilla	(Italy) Roma
2022–23	UEFA Europa Conference League	(England) West Ham United	(Italy) Fiorentina

=== Finalists from the same country ===
- Until 1997, the UEFA Cup was the only European club competition which routinely allocated multiple entrants to many countries. This has led to several finals featuring two clubs from the same country, in contrast to other UEFA club competitions before this time.
- In total, on eleven occasions at the UEFA Cup/Europa League, on eight occasions at the UEFA Champions League and on eight occasions at the European/UEFA Super Cup has the final of the tournament involved two teams from the same nation. This makes a total of 27 same-country finals across all these competitions (10 all-Spanish finals, seven all-Italian finals, seven all-English finals, two all-German finals, one all-Portuguese final).

Year	Competition	Country	Winners	Score	Runners-up
1972	UEFA Cup	England	Tottenham Hotspur	3–2 agg.	Wolverhampton Wanderers
1980	UEFA Cup	West Germany	Eintracht Frankfurt	3–3 (a)	Borussia Mönchengladbach
1990	UEFA Cup	Italy	Juventus	3–1 agg.	Fiorentina
1990	European Super Cup	Italy	Milan	3–1 agg.	Sampdoria
1991	UEFA Cup	Italy	Inter Milan	2–1 agg.	Roma
1993	European Super Cup	Italy	Parma	2–1 agg.	Milan
1995	UEFA Cup	Italy	Parma	2–1 agg.	Juventus
1998	UEFA Cup	Italy	Inter Milan	3–0	Lazio
2000	UEFA Champions League	Spain	Real Madrid	3–0	Valencia
2003	UEFA Champions League	Italy	Milan	0–0 (3–2 p)	Juventus
2006	UEFA Super Cup	Spain	Sevilla	3–0	Barcelona
2007	UEFA Cup	Spain	Sevilla	2–2 (3–1 p)	Espanyol
2008	UEFA Champions League	England	Manchester United	1–1 (6–5 p)	Chelsea
2011	UEFA Europa League	Portugal	Porto	1–0	Braga
2012	UEFA Europa League	Spain	Atlético Madrid	3–0	Athletic Bilbao
2013	UEFA Champions League	Germany	Bayern Munich	2–1	Borussia Dortmund
2014	UEFA Champions League	Spain	Real Madrid	4–1 (a.e.t.)	Atlético Madrid
2014	UEFA Super Cup	Spain	Real Madrid	2–0	Sevilla
2015	UEFA Super Cup	Spain	Barcelona	5–4 (a.e.t.)	Sevilla
2016	UEFA Super Cup	Spain	Real Madrid	3–2 (a.e.t.)	Sevilla
2016	UEFA Champions League	Spain	Real Madrid	1–1 (5–3 p)	Atlético Madrid
2018	UEFA Super Cup	Spain	Atlético Madrid	4–2 (a.e.t.)	Real Madrid
2019	UEFA Europa League	England	Chelsea	4–1	Arsenal
2019	UEFA Champions League	England	Liverpool	2–0	Tottenham Hotspur
2019	UEFA Super Cup	England	Liverpool	2–2 (5–4 p)	Chelsea
2021	UEFA Champions League	England	Chelsea	1–0	Manchester City
2025	UEFA Europa League	England	Tottenham Hotspur	1–0	Manchester United

=== Finalists from the same city ===
Clubs from the same city played with each other on four occasions. Only Madrid and London clubs have achieved this rare feat.

Edition	Competition	City	Winners	Score	Runners-up
2013–14	UEFA Champions League	(Spain) Madrid	Real Madrid	4–1 (a.e.t.)	Atlético Madrid
2015–16	UEFA Champions League	(Spain) Madrid	Real Madrid	1–1 (5–3 p)	Atlético Madrid
2018	UEFA Super Cup	(Spain) Madrid	Atlético Madrid	4–2 (a.e.t.)	Real Madrid
2018–19	UEFA Europa League	(England) London	Chelsea	4–1	Arsenal

=== Other records ===
- Milan have lost a record 11 UEFA competition finals: 4 in the European Cup/UEFA Champions League, a shared record of 4 in the Intercontinental Cup (with Argentinian side Independiente), 1 in the Cup Winners' Cup, and 2 in the UEFA Super Cup.
- Real Madrid have played (627) and won (369) more games than any other side in Europe, and also hold the records for most goals scored (1,331) and conceded (691) as of 9 September 2026.
- Barcelona have drawn more games than any other team (124) as of 9 September 2026.
- Anderlecht have lost the most games in confederation competitions (154) as of 27 August 2026.
- Jeunesse Esch have the worst goal difference in UEFA competition matches (−183 from 81 games) as of June 2020.

== Players ==
=== List of players to have won the three main European club competitions ===
The table below show the ten players who have won all three major former and current UEFA club competitions (chronological order).

Footballer	First title	Second title	Treble title
(Italy) Antonio Cabrini	1976–77 UEFA Cup (Juventus)	1983–84 European Cup Winners' Cup (Juventus)	1984–85 European Cup (Juventus)
(Italy) Gaetano Scirea	1976–77 UEFA Cup (Juventus)	1983–84 European Cup Winners' Cup (Juventus)	1984–85 European Cup (Juventus)
(Italy) Marco Tardelli	1976–77 UEFA Cup (Juventus)	1983–84 European Cup Winners' Cup (Juventus)	1984–85 European Cup (Juventus)
(Netherlands) Arnold Mühren	1972–73 European Cup (Ajax)	1980–81 UEFA Cup (Ipswich Town)	1986–87 European Cup Winners' Cup (Ajax)
(Italy) Sergio Brio	1983–84 European Cup Winners' Cup (Juventus)	1984–85 European Cup (Juventus)	1989–90 UEFA Cup (Juventus)
(Italy) Stefano Tacconi	1983–84 European Cup Winners' Cup (Juventus)	1984–85 European Cup (Juventus)	1989–90 UEFA Cup (Juventus)
(Netherlands) Danny Blind	1986–87 European Cup Winners' Cup (Ajax)	1991–92 UEFA Cup (Ajax)	1994–95 UEFA Champions League (Ajax)
(Italy) Gianluca Vialli	1989–90 European Cup Winners' Cup (Sampdoria)	1992–93 UEFA Cup (Juventus)	1995–96 UEFA Champions League (Juventus)
(Portugal) Vítor Baía	1996–97 UEFA Cup Winners' Cup (Barcelona)	2002–03 UEFA Cup (Porto)	2003–04 UEFA Champions League (Porto)
(Italy) Emerson Palmieri	2018–19 UEFA Europa League (Chelsea)	2020–21 UEFA Champions League (Chelsea)	2022–23 UEFA Europa Conference League (West Ham United)
(England) Tammy Abraham	2020–21 UEFA Champions League (Chelsea)	2021–22 UEFA Europa Conference League (Roma)	2025–26 UEFA Europa League (Aston Villa)

Shows first win only for any player with multiple wins of same competition.

=== List of players to have won all international club competitions ===
Although no footballer has ever won all six competitions, the table below show the only six players who have won five different international competitions organised by UEFA, including the three seasonal tournaments, until the introduction of the Conference League in 2021–22 season (chronological order).

Footballer	European Cup/ Champions League	UEFA Cup/ Europa League	UEFA Cup Winners' Cup	UEFA Super Cup	Intercontinental Cup
(Italy) Gaetano Scirea	1985 – Juventus	1977 – Juventus	1984 – Juventus	1984 – Juventus	1985 – Juventus
(Italy) Antonio Cabrini	1985 – Juventus	1977 – Juventus	1984 – Juventus	1984 – Juventus	1985 – Juventus
(Netherlands) Arnold Mühren	1973 – Ajax	1981 – Ipswich Town	1987 – Ajax	1973 – Ajax	1972 – Ajax
(Italy) Stefano Tacconi	1985 – Juventus	1990 – Juventus	1984 – Juventus	1984 – Juventus	1985 – Juventus
(Italy) Sergio Brio	1985 – Juventus	1990 – Juventus	1984 – Juventus	1984 – Juventus	1985 – Juventus
(Netherlands) Danny Blind	1995 – Ajax	1992 – Ajax	1987 – Ajax	1995 – Ajax	1995 – Ajax

=== Most appearances in UEFA club competitions ===
As of 10 September 2026

Includes all rounds of UEFA Champions League (UCL), UEFA Cup Winners' Cup (UCWC), UEFA Europa League (UEL), UEFA Conference League (UECL), UEFA Intertoto Cup (UIC), UEFA Super Cup (USC), Intercontinental Cup (IC)

Rank	Player	Apps	Debut in Europe	Retirement	Club(s)
1	(Portugal) Cristiano Ronaldo	197	2002	—	Sporting CP; Manchester United; Real Madrid; Juventus
2	(Spain) Pepe Reina	192	2000	2025	Barcelona; Villarreal; Liverpool; Napoli; Milan; Lazio
3	(Spain) Iker Casillas	188	1999	2019	Real Madrid; Porto
4	(Portugal) **João Moutinho**	182	2004	—	Sporting CP; Porto; Monaco; Wolverhampton Wanderers; **Braga**
5	(Italy) Paolo Maldini	174	1985	2009	Milan
6	(Croatia) **Luka Modrić**	173	2006	—	Dinamo Zagreb; Tottenham Hotspur; Real Madrid
6	(Spain) Xavi	173	1999	2019	Barcelona
8	(Poland) Robert Lewandowski	171	2008	—	Lech Poznań; Borussia Dortmund; Bayern Munich; Barcelona
8	(Germany) **Manuel Neuer**	171	2007	—	Schalke 04; **Bayern Munich**
10	(Italy) Gianluigi Buffon	167	1995	2023	Parma; Juventus; Paris Saint-Germain
10	(Argentina) Lionel Messi	167	2004	—	Barcelona; Paris Saint-Germain
10	(Germany) Thomas Müller	167	2009	—	Bayern Munich

Bold = Still active
Italics = Active but not in UEFA

=== Top scorers in UEFA club competitions ===
As of 10 September 2026

Includes all rounds of UEFA Champions League (UCL), UEFA Cup Winners' Cup (UCWC), UEFA Europa League (UEL), UEFA Conference League (UECL), UEFA Intertoto Cup (UIC), UEFA Super Cup (USC), Intercontinental Cup (IC)

Rank	Player	Goals	Apps (Note: Including appearances with club(s) they did not score in UEFA club competitions for.)	Goal ratio	Debut in Europe	Retirement	Club(s) (Note: Only include club(s) with whom they scored in UEFA club competitions.)
1	(Portugal) Cristiano Ronaldo	145	197	0.74	2002	—	Sporting CP; Manchester United; Real Madrid; Juventus
2	(Argentina) Lionel Messi	132	167	0.79	2004	—	Barcelona; Paris Saint-Germain
3	(Poland) Robert Lewandowski	117	171	0.68	2008	—	Lech Poznań; Borussia Dortmund; Bayern Munich; Barcelona
4	(France) Karim Benzema	92	157	0.59	2005	—	Lyon; Real Madrid
5	(England) **Harry Kane**	79	114	0.69	2011	—	Tottenham Hotspur; **Bayern Munich**
6	(Spain) Raúl	77	161	0.48	1995	2012	Real Madrid; Schalke 04
7	(France) **Kylian Mbappé**	72	101	0.71	2015	—	Monaco; Paris Saint-Germain; **Real Madrid**
8	(Italy) Filippo Inzaghi	70	114	0.61	1995	2012	Parma; Juventus; Milan
9	(Ukraine) Andriy Shevchenko	67	143	0.47	1994	2012	Dynamo Kyiv; Milan; Chelsea
9	(Bosnia and Herzegovina) **Edin Džeko**	67	160	0.42	2008	—	Wolfsburg; Manchester City; Roma; Inter Milan; Fenerbahçe; Fiorentina

Bold = Still active
Italics = Active but not in UEFA

=== Other records ===
- In September 2021, Harry Kane became the first player to score a hat-trick in each of the Champions League, Europa League, and Conference League.
- Paolo Maldini is the player with the most European appearances for a single club (174 for AC Milan).
- In March 2023, Gift Orban became the fastest hat-trick scorer in the history of UEFA club competitions.

== Managers ==
=== List of managers to have won three main European club competitions ===
The table below show the only three managers who have won three different major UEFA club competitions. Nobody has managed to win all four competitions as a manager, although José Mourinho did win the now-defunct Cup Winner's Cup as an assistant manager before winning the current three cups as manager.

Manager	First title	Second title	Treble title
(Germany) Udo Lattek	1973–74 European Cup (Bayern Munich)	1978–79 UEFA Cup (Borussia Mönchengladbach)	1981–82 European Cup Winners' Cup (Barcelona)
(Italy) Giovanni Trapattoni	1976–77 UEFA Cup (Juventus)	1983–84 European Cup Winners' Cup (Juventus)	1984–85 European Cup (Juventus)
(Portugal) José Mourinho	2002–03 UEFA Cup (Porto)	2003–04 UEFA Champions League (Porto)	2021–22 UEFA Europa Conference League (Roma)

Shows first win only for any manager with multiple wins of same competition.

French manager Arsène Wenger is the only manager who has been runner-up in three major UEFA club competitions. He finished runner-up in the 1991–92 European Cup Winners' Cup with Monaco and in the 1999–2000 UEFA Cup and 2005–06 UEFA Champions League with Arsenal.

=== List of managers to have won all international club competitions ===
Although no manager has ever won all seven competitions, the table below shows the only one to have won five different international tournaments organised by UEFA, including the three seasonal tournaments, until the introduction of the Conference League in the 2021–22 season.

Manager	European Cup/ Champions League	UEFA Cup/ Europa League	UEFA Cup Winners' Cup	UEFA Super Cup	Intercontinental Cup
(Italy) Giovanni Trapattoni	1985 – Juventus	1977 – Juventus	1984 – Juventus	1984 – Juventus	1985 – Juventus

Shows first win only in the case of manager's multiple wins of same competition.

== Attendance ==
=== Highest attendance for a UEFA club competition ===
Rank	Match	Date	Competition	Stadium and city	Attendance	Ref.
1	(Scotland) Celtic 2–1 (England) Leeds United	15 April 1970	European Cup	Hampden Park, Glasgow, Scotland	136,505 (official attendance)	

== See also ==
- European Cup and UEFA Champions League records and statistics
- UEFA Cup and Europa League records and statistics
- UEFA Cup Winners' Cup records and statistics
- European association football club records and statistics
- List of world association football records
