= List of UEFA Conference League finals =

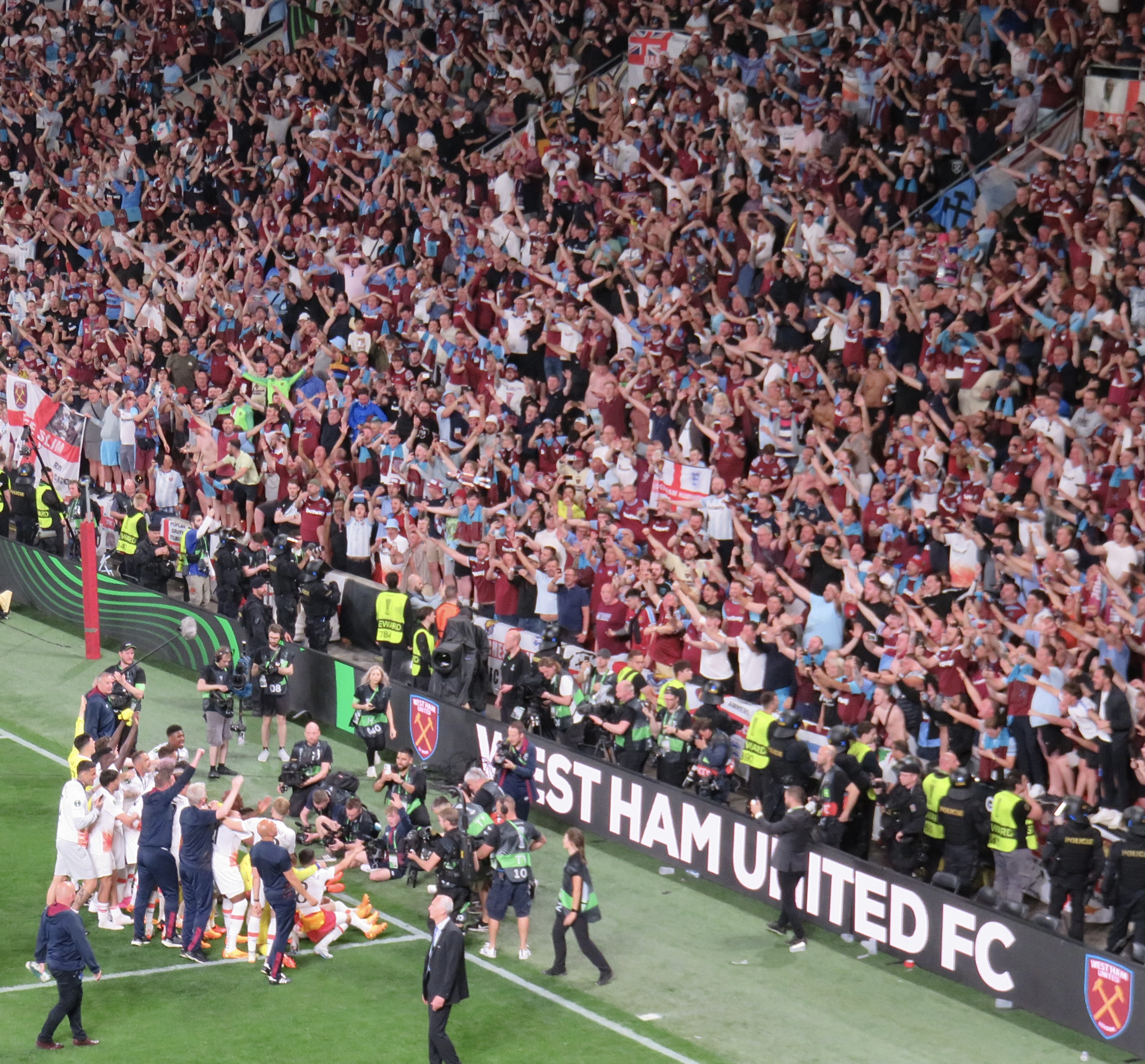
- West Ham players celebrating victory in the 2023 final
- Founded: 2021
- Region: UEFA (Europe)
- Teams: 36 (league stage); 2 (finalists)
- Current champions: (England) Crystal Palace (1st title)
- Most championships: (Italy) Roma (England) West Ham United (Greece) Olympiacos (England) Chelsea (England) Crystal Palace (1 title each)
- 2026 UEFA Conference League final

The UEFA Conference League, formerly the UEFA Europa Conference League, is a seasonal football competition established in 2021. It was created by UEFA to accommodate at least 34 of its national associations in the group stage of its competitions and is the third-tier of European football behind the UEFA Champions League and the UEFA Europa League. The winner automatically qualifies for the subsequent season's Europa League, unless they have already qualified for the Champions League through their domestic league. The format includes a 36-team league phase and a 24-team knockout stage, in which matches are played over two legs with the final held at a neutral venue.

The competition was announced in 2018, and began in 2021. UEFA created the competition in order to offer European competition for more clubs and have more representation from associations that might not qualify for the group stages of the Champions League or Europa League. This is determined via the UEFA country coefficients with three teams participating from nations ranked 16 to 50, two teams participating from nations ranked 6 to 15 and 51 to 55, and one team participating from nations ranked 1 to 5.

Roma won the inaugural competition with a 1–0 victory in the 2022 final against Feyenoord. Crystal Palace are the current champions; they beat Rayo Vallecano 1–0 in the 2026 final. Fiorentina is the first team to play in more than one final and also the first to lose multiple finals. Clubs from England are the most successful, with three wins.

== List of finals ==
Key
| † | Match went to extra time |

UEFA Conference League finals
| Season | Country | Winners | Score | Runners-up | Country | Venue | Attendance | Ref. |
|---|---|---|---|---|---|---|---|---|
| 2021–22 | Italy | Roma | 1–0 | Feyenoord | Netherlands | Arena Kombëtare, Tirana, Albania | 19,597 | |
| 2022–23 | England | West Ham United | 2–1 | Fiorentina | Italy | Fortuna Arena, Prague, Czech Republic | 17,363 | |
| 2023–24 | Greece | Olympiacos | 1–0^{†} | Fiorentina | Italy | Agia Sophia Stadium, Athens, Greece | 26,842 | |
| 2024–25 | England | Chelsea | 4–1 | Real Betis | Spain | Stadion Wrocław, Wrocław, Poland | 39,754 | |
| 2025–26 | England | Crystal Palace | 1–0 | Rayo Vallecano | Spain | Red Bull Arena, Leipzig, Germany | 39,176 | |

Upcoming final(s)
| Season | Country | Finalist | Match | Finalist | Country | Venue | Ref. |
|---|---|---|---|---|---|---|---|
| 2026–27 | | | v | | | Beşiktaş Stadium, Istanbul, Turkey | |
| 2027–28 | | | v | | | Juventus Stadium, Turin, Italy | |
| 2028–29 | | | v | | | Puskás Aréna, Budapest, Hungary | |

== Performances ==
=== By club ===
Performance in the UEFA Conference League by club
| Club | Winners | Runners-up | Years won | Years runner-up |
|---|---|---|---|---|
| (Italy) Roma | 1 | 0 | 2022 | — |
| (England) West Ham United | 1 | 0 | 2023 | — |
| (Greece) Olympiacos | 1 | 0 | 2024 | — |
| (England) Chelsea | 1 | 0 | 2025 | — |
| (England) Crystal Palace | 1 | 0 | 2026 | — |
| (Italy) Fiorentina | 0 | 2 | — | 2023, 2024 |
| (Netherlands) Feyenoord | 0 | 1 | — | 2022 |
| (Spain) Real Betis | 0 | 1 | — | 2025 |
| (Spain) Rayo Vallecano | 0 | 1 | — | 2026 |

=== By nation ===
Performance in finals by nation
| Nation | Winners | Runners-up | Total |
|---|---|---|---|
| England | 3 | 0 | 3 |
| Italy | 1 | 2 | 3 |
| Greece | 1 | 0 | 1 |
| Spain | 0 | 2 | 2 |
| Netherlands | 0 | 1 | 1 |

== See also ==
- List of European Cup and UEFA Champions League finals
- List of UEFA Conference League–winning managers
- List of UEFA Cup and Europa League finals
- List of UEFA Cup Winners' Cup finals
