= List of European Cup and UEFA Champions League finals =

European football matches

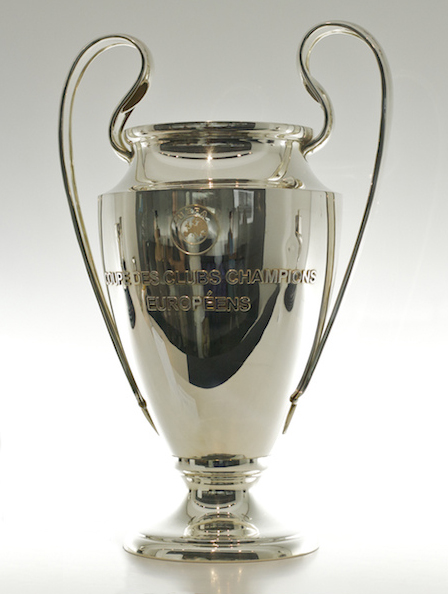
- European Cup / Champions League trophy
- Founded: 1955
- Region: UEFA (Europe)
- Teams: 36 (league stage); 2 (finalists)
- Current champions: (France) Paris Saint-Germain (2nd title)
- Most championships: (Spain) Real Madrid (15 titles)
- 2026 UEFA Champions League final

The UEFA Champions League is a seasonal football competition established in 1955. Prior to the 1992–93 season, the tournament was named the European Cup. The UEFA Champions League is open to the league champions of all UEFA (Union of European Football Associations) member associations (except Liechtenstein, which has no league competition), as well as to the clubs finishing from second to fourth positions in the strongest leagues. Originally, only the champions of their respective national league and the defending champions of the competition were allowed to participate. However, this was changed in 1997 to allow the runners-up of the stronger leagues to compete as well, and again in 1999 when third and fourth-placed teams of the said leagues also became eligible. In the Champions League era, the defending champions of the competition did not automatically qualify until the rules were changed in 2005 to allow title holders Liverpool to enter the competition.

Teams that have won the UEFA Champions League three consecutive times, or five times overall, receive a multiple-winner badge. Six teams have earned this privilege: Real Madrid, Ajax, Bayern Munich, AC Milan, Liverpool, and Barcelona. Until 2009, clubs that had earned that badge were allowed to keep the European Champion Clubs' Cup and a new one was commissioned; since 2009, the winning team each year has received a full-size replica of the trophy, while the original is retained by UEFA.

A total of 24 clubs have won the Champions League/European Cup. Real Madrid holds the record for the most victories, having won the competition 15 times, including the inaugural edition. They have also won the competition the most consecutive times, with five straight titles from 1956 to 1960. Juventus have been runners-up the most times, losing seven finals. Atlético Madrid is the only team to reach three finals without having won the trophy while Reims, Valencia, and Arsenal have finished as runners-up twice without winning. Spain has provided the most champions, with twenty wins from two clubs. England have produced fifteen winners from a record six clubs and Italy have produced twelve winners from three clubs. English teams were banned from the competition for five years following the Heysel disaster in 1985. The current champions are Paris Saint-Germain, who beat Arsenal 4–3 on penalties following a 1–1 draw after extra time in the 2026 final.

While the venue for the final is chosen well in advance, on four occasions clubs have reached a final scheduled to be played in their own stadium; Real Madrid won their second European Cup in the Santiago Bernabéu Stadium in 1957, while in 1965 Inter Milan also won their second title in the final at the San Siro. In 1984, the Stadio Olimpico in Rome was the venue and saw Roma defeated on penalties by Liverpool, while 2012 saw the Allianz Arena host the final between Bayern Munich and Chelsea, which the English club also won on penalties.

== List of finals ==
Key
†	Match went to extra time
*	Match won on a penalty shoot-out
&	Match won after a replay

European Cup and UEFA Champions League finals
Season	Country	Winners	Score	Runners-up	Country	Venue	Attendance
1955–56	Spain	Real Madrid	4–3	Reims	France	Parc des Princes, Paris, France	38,239
1956–57	Spain	Real Madrid	2–0	Fiorentina	Italy	Santiago Bernabéu, Madrid, Spain	124,000
1957–58	Spain	Real Madrid	3–2^{†}	Milan	Italy	Heysel Stadium, Brussels, Belgium	67,000
1958–59	Spain	Real Madrid	2–0	Reims	France	Neckarstadion, Stuttgart, West Germany	72,000
1959–60	Spain	Real Madrid	7–3	Eintracht Frankfurt	West Germany	Hampden Park, Glasgow, Scotland	127,621
1960–61	Portugal	Benfica	3–2	Barcelona	Spain	Wankdorf Stadium, Bern, Switzerland	26,732
1961–62	Portugal	Benfica	5–3	Real Madrid	Spain	Olympisch Stadion, Amsterdam, Netherlands	61,257
1962–63	Italy	Milan	2–1	Benfica	Portugal	Wembley Stadium, London, England	45,715
1963–64	Italy	Inter Milan	3–1	Real Madrid	Spain	Praterstadion, Vienna, Austria	71,333
1964–65	Italy	Inter Milan	1–0	Benfica	Portugal	San Siro, Milan, Italy	89,000
1965–66	Spain	Real Madrid	2–1	Partizan	Yugoslavia	Heysel Stadium, Brussels, Belgium	46,745
1966–67	Scotland	Celtic	2–1	Inter Milan	Italy	Estádio Nacional, Lisbon, Portugal	45,000
1967–68	England	Manchester United	4–1^{†}	Benfica	Portugal	Wembley Stadium, London, England	92,225
1968–69	Italy	Milan	4–1	Ajax	Netherlands	Santiago Bernabéu, Madrid, Spain	31,782
1969–70	Netherlands	Feyenoord	2–1^{†}	Celtic	Scotland	San Siro, Milan, Italy	53,187
1970–71	Netherlands	Ajax	2–0	Panathinaikos	Greece	Wembley Stadium, London, England	83,179
1971–72	Netherlands	Ajax	2–0	Inter Milan	Italy	De Kuip, Rotterdam, Netherlands	61,354
1972–73	Netherlands	Ajax	1–0	Juventus	Italy	Red Star Stadium, Belgrade, SFR Yugoslavia	89,484
1973–74	West Germany	Bayern Munich	1–1	Atlético Madrid	Spain	Heysel Stadium, Brussels, Belgium	48,722
1973–74	West Germany	Bayern Munich	4–0^{&}	Atlético Madrid	Spain	Heysel Stadium, Brussels, Belgium	23,325
1974–75	West Germany	Bayern Munich	2–0	Leeds United	England	Parc des Princes, Paris, France	48,374
1975–76	West Germany	Bayern Munich	1–0	Saint-Étienne	France	Hampden Park, Glasgow, Scotland	54,864
1976–77	England	Liverpool	3–1	Borussia Mönchengladbach	West Germany	Stadio Olimpico, Rome, Italy	57,000
1977–78	England	Liverpool	1–0	Club Brugge	Belgium	Wembley Stadium, London, England	92,500
1978–79	England	Nottingham Forest	1–0	Malmö FF	Sweden	Olympiastadion, Munich, West Germany	57,500
1979–80	England	Nottingham Forest	1–0	Hamburger SV	West Germany	Santiago Bernabéu, Madrid, Spain	51,000
1980–81	England	Liverpool	1–0	Real Madrid	Spain	Parc des Princes, Paris, France	48,360
1981–82	England	Aston Villa	1–0	Bayern Munich	West Germany	De Kuip, Rotterdam, Netherlands	46,000
1982–83	West Germany	Hamburger SV	1–0	Juventus	Italy	Olympic Stadium, Athens, Greece	73,500
1983–84	England	Liverpool	1–1* (Note: Score was 1–1 after 90 minutes and extra time. Liverpool won the penalty shoot-out 4–2.)	Roma	Italy	Stadio Olimpico, Rome, Italy	69,693
1984–85	Italy	Juventus	1–0	Liverpool	England	Heysel Stadium, Brussels, Belgium	58,000
1985–86	Romania	Steaua București	0–0* (Note: Score was 0–0 after 90 minutes and extra time. Steaua București won the penalty shoot-out 2–0.)	Barcelona	Spain	Ramón Sánchez Pizjuán, Seville, Spain	70,000
1986–87	Portugal	Porto	2–1	Bayern Munich	West Germany	Praterstadion, Vienna, Austria	57,500
1987–88	Netherlands	PSV Eindhoven	0–0* (Note: Score was 0–0 after 90 minutes and extra time. PSV Eindhoven won the penalty shoot-out 6–5.)	Benfica	Portugal	Neckarstadion, Stuttgart, West Germany	68,000
1988–89	Italy	Milan	4–0	Steaua București	Romania	Camp Nou, Barcelona, Spain	97,000
1989–90	Italy	Milan	1–0	Benfica	Portugal	Praterstadion, Vienna, Austria	57,558
1990–91	Yugoslavia	Red Star Belgrade	0–0* (Note: Score was 0–0 after 90 minutes and extra time. Red Star Belgrade won the penalty shoot-out 5–3.)	Marseille	France	Stadio San Nicola, Bari, Italy	56,000
1991–92	Spain	Barcelona	1–0^{†}	Sampdoria	Italy	Wembley Stadium, London, England	70,827
1992–93	France	Marseille	1–0	Milan	Italy	Olympiastadion, Munich, Germany	64,400
1993–94	Italy	Milan	4–0	Barcelona	Spain	Olympic Stadium, Athens, Greece	70,000
1994–95	Netherlands	Ajax	1–0	Milan	Italy	Ernst-Happel-Stadion, Vienna, Austria	49,730
1995–96	Italy	Juventus	1–1* (Note: Score was 1–1 after 90 minutes and extra time. Juventus won the penalty shoot-out 4–2.)	Ajax	Netherlands	Stadio Olimpico, Rome, Italy	70,000
1996–97	Germany	Borussia Dortmund	3–1	Juventus	Italy	Olympiastadion, Munich, Germany	59,000
1997–98	Spain	Real Madrid	1–0	Juventus	Italy	Amsterdam Arena, Amsterdam, Netherlands	48,500
1998–99	England	Manchester United	2–1	Bayern Munich	Germany	Camp Nou, Barcelona, Spain	90,245
1999–2000	Spain	Real Madrid	3–0	Valencia	Spain	Stade de France, Saint-Denis, France	80,000
2000–01	Germany	Bayern Munich	1–1* (Note: Score was 1–1 after 90 minutes and extra time. Bayern Munich won the penalty shoot-out 5–4.)	Valencia	Spain	San Siro, Milan, Italy	79,000
2001–02	Spain	Real Madrid	2–1	Bayer Leverkusen	Germany	Hampden Park, Glasgow, Scotland	50,499
2002–03	Italy	Milan	0–0* (Note: Score was 0–0 after 90 minutes and extra time. Milan won the penalty shoot-out 3–2.)	Juventus	Italy	Old Trafford, Manchester, England	62,315
2003–04	Portugal	Porto	3–0	Monaco	France	Arena AufSchalke, Gelsenkirchen, Germany	53,053
2004–05	England	Liverpool	3–3* (Note: Score was 3–3 after 90 minutes and extra time. Liverpool won the penalty shoot-out 3–2.)	Milan	Italy	Atatürk Olympic Stadium, Istanbul, Turkey	69,000
2005–06	Spain	Barcelona	2–1	Arsenal	England	Stade de France, Saint-Denis, France	79,610
2006–07	Italy	Milan	2–1	Liverpool	England	Olympic Stadium, Athens, Greece	63,000
2007–08	England	Manchester United	1–1* (Note: Score was 1–1 after 90 minutes and extra time. Manchester United won the penalty shoot-out 6–5.)	Chelsea	England	Luzhniki Stadium, Moscow, Russia	67,310
2008–09	Spain	Barcelona	2–0	Manchester United	England	Stadio Olimpico, Rome, Italy	62,467
2009–10	Italy	Inter Milan	2–0	Bayern Munich	Germany	Santiago Bernabéu, Madrid, Spain	73,490
2010–11	Spain	Barcelona	3–1	Manchester United	England	Wembley Stadium, London, England	87,695
2011–12	England	Chelsea	1–1* (Note: Score was 1–1 after 90 minutes and extra time. Chelsea won the penalty shoot-out 4–3.)	Bayern Munich	Germany	Allianz Arena, Munich, Germany	62,500
2012–13	Germany	Bayern Munich	2–1	Borussia Dortmund	Germany	Wembley Stadium, London, England	86,298
2013–14	Spain	Real Madrid	4–1^{†}	Atlético Madrid	Spain	Estádio da Luz, Lisbon, Portugal	60,976
2014–15	Spain	Barcelona	3–1	Juventus	Italy	Olympiastadion, Berlin, Germany	70,442
2015–16	Spain	Real Madrid	1–1* (Note: Score was 1–1 after 90 minutes and extra time. Real Madrid won the penalty shoot-out 5–3.)	Atlético Madrid	Spain	San Siro, Milan, Italy	71,942
2016–17	Spain	Real Madrid	4–1	Juventus	Italy	Millennium Stadium, Cardiff, Wales	65,842
2017–18	Spain	Real Madrid	3–1	Liverpool	England	NSC Olimpiyskiy Stadium, Kyiv, Ukraine	61,561
2018–19	England	Liverpool	2–0	Tottenham Hotspur	England	Metropolitano Stadium, Madrid, Spain	63,272
2019–20	Germany	Bayern Munich	1–0	Paris Saint-Germain	France	Estádio da Luz, Lisbon, Portugal	0 (Note: The 2020 final was played behind closed doors due to the COVID-19 pandemic in Europe.)
2020–21	England	Chelsea	1–0	Manchester City	England	Estádio do Dragão, Porto, Portugal	14,110 (Note: The 2021 final was played with limited capacity due to the COVID-19 pandemic in Europe.)
2021–22	Spain	Real Madrid	1–0	Liverpool	England	Stade de France, Saint-Denis, France	75,000
2022–23	England	Manchester City	1–0	Inter Milan	Italy	Atatürk Olympic Stadium, Istanbul, Turkey	71,412
2023–24	Spain	Real Madrid	2–0	Borussia Dortmund	Germany	Wembley Stadium, London, England	86,212
2024–25	France	Paris Saint-Germain	5–0	Inter Milan	Italy	Allianz Arena, Munich, Germany	64,327
2025–26	France	Paris Saint-Germain	1–1* (Note: Score was 1–1 after 90 minutes and extra time. Paris Saint-Germain won the penalty shoot-out 4–3.)	Arsenal	England	Puskás Aréna, Budapest, Hungary	61,035

Upcoming final(s)
Season	Country	Finalist	Match	Finalist	Country	Venue
2026–27			v			Metropolitano Stadium, Madrid, Spain
2027–28			v			Allianz Arena, Munich, Germany
2028–29			v			Camp Nou, Barcelona, Spain

== Performances ==
=== By club ===
Performances in the European Cup and UEFA Champions League by club
Club	Title(s)	Runners-up	Seasons won	Seasons runner-up
(Spain) Real Madrid	15	3	1956, 1957, 1958, 1959, 1960, 1966, 1998, 2000, 2002, 2014, 2016, 2017, 2018, 2022, 2024	1962, 1964, 1981
(Italy) Milan	7	4	1963, 1969, 1989, 1990, 1994, 2003, 2007	1958, 1993, 1995, 2005
(Germany) Bayern Munich	6	5	1974, 1975, 1976, 2001, 2013, 2020	1982, 1987, 1999, 2010, 2012
(England) Liverpool	6	4	1977, 1978, 1981, 1984, 2005, 2019	1985, 2007, 2018, 2022
(Spain) Barcelona	5	3	1992, 2006, 2009, 2011, 2015	1961, 1986, 1994
(Netherlands) Ajax	4	2	1971, 1972, 1973, 1995	1969, 1996
(Italy) Inter Milan	3	4	1964, 1965, 2010	1967, 1972, 2023, 2025
(England) Manchester United	3	2	1968, 1999, 2008	2009, 2011
(Italy) Juventus	2	7	1985, 1996	1973, 1983, 1997, 1998, 2003, 2015, 2017
(Portugal) Benfica	2	5	1961, 1962	1963, 1965, 1968, 1988, 1990
(England) Chelsea	2	1	2012, 2021	2008
(France) Paris Saint-Germain	2	1	2025, 2026	2020
(England) Nottingham Forest	2	0	1979, 1980	—
(Portugal) Porto	2	0	1987, 2004	—
(Germany) Borussia Dortmund	1	2	1997	2013, 2024
(Scotland) Celtic	1	1	1967	1970
(Germany) Hamburger SV	1	1	1983	1980
(Romania) Steaua București	1	1	1986	1989
(France) Marseille	1	1	1993	1991
(England) Manchester City	1	1	2023	2021
(Netherlands) Feyenoord	1	0	1970	—
(England) Aston Villa	1	0	1982	—
(Netherlands) PSV Eindhoven	1	0	1988	—
(Socialist Federal Republic of Yugoslavia) Red Star Belgrade	1	0	1991	—
(Spain) Atlético Madrid	0	3	—	1974, 2014, 2016
(France) Reims	0	2	—	1956, 1959
(Spain) Valencia	0	2	—	2000, 2001
(England) Arsenal	0	2	—	2006, 2026
(Italy) Fiorentina	0	1	—	1957
(Germany) Eintracht Frankfurt	0	1	—	1960
(Socialist Federal Republic of Yugoslavia) Partizan	0	1	—	1966
(Greece) Panathinaikos	0	1	—	1971
(England) Leeds United	0	1	—	1975
(France) Saint-Étienne	0	1	—	1976
(Germany) Borussia Mönchengladbach	0	1	—	1977
(Belgium) Club Brugge	0	1	—	1978
(Sweden) Malmö FF	0	1	—	1979
(Italy) Roma	0	1	—	1984
(Italy) Sampdoria	0	1	—	1992
(Germany) Bayer Leverkusen	0	1	—	2002
(France) Monaco	0	1	—	2004
(England) Tottenham Hotspur	0	1	—	2019

=== By nation ===
Clubs from thirteen nations have reached the final, and clubs from ten of those have won the competition. England has produced the most winning teams, with six clubs having won the trophy. Italy, Germany and the Netherlands have each had three clubs lift the title, while Spain, Portugal and France have had two winners apiece. Scotland, Romania and Yugoslavia have each had one club win the competition.

Performances in finals by nation
Nation	Title(s)	Runners-up	Total
Spain	20	11	31
England	15	12	27
Italy	12	18	30
Germany (Note: Includes clubs representing West Germany. No clubs representing East Germany appeared in a final.)	8	11	19
Netherlands	6	2	8
Portugal	4	5	9
France	3	6	9
Romania	1	1	2
Scotland	1	1	2
Yugoslavia (Note: Both Yugoslav final appearances were by clubs from SR Serbia.)	1	1	2
Belgium	0	1	1
Greece	0	1	1
Sweden	0	1	1

European Cup and UEFA Champions League winning clubs by nation
Nation	Winning clubs (in order of first win)	Number of winners
England	Manchester United, Liverpool, Nottingham Forest, Aston Villa, Chelsea, Manchester City	6
Italy	Milan, Inter Milan, Juventus	3
Germany	Bayern Munich, Hamburger SV, Borussia Dortmund	3
Netherlands	Feyenoord, Ajax, PSV Eindhoven	3
Spain	Real Madrid, Barcelona	2
Portugal	Benfica, Porto	2
France	Marseille, Paris Saint-Germain	2
Scotland	Celtic	1
Romania	Steaua București	1
Yugoslavia	Red Star Belgrade	1

== See also ==
- List of European Cup and UEFA Champions League winning managers
- List of UEFA Women's Cup and Women's Champions League finals
- List of UEFA Cup and Europa League finals
- List of UEFA Conference League finals
- List of UEFA Cup Winners' Cup finals
- List of Intercontinental Cup matches
- List of UEFA Super Cup matches
