= List of UEFA Cup and Europa League finals =

European football matches

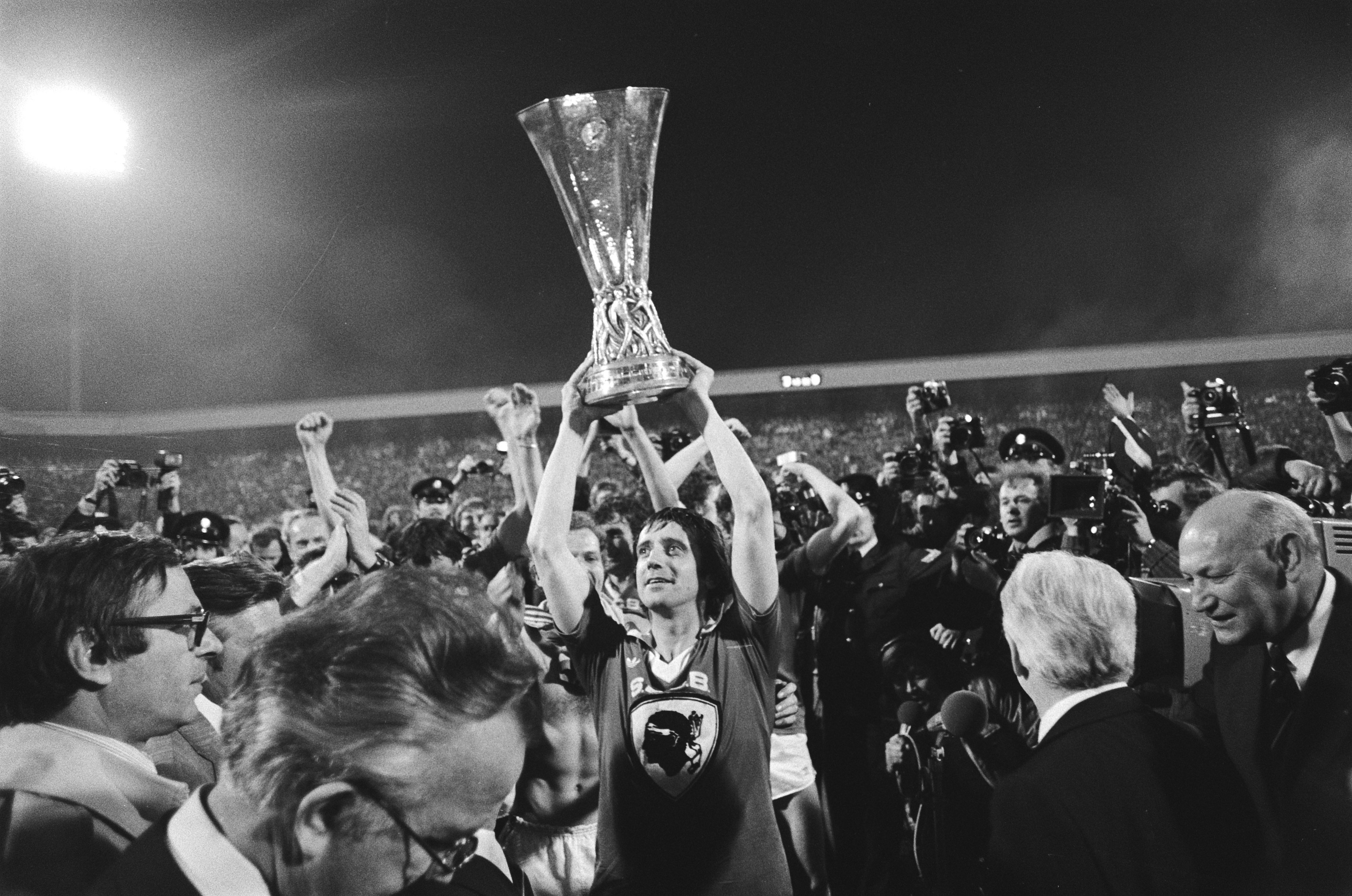
- Willy van der Kuijlen lifting the UEFA Cup in 1978 following PSV Eindhoven's victory over Bastia.
- Founded: 1971
- Region: UEFA (Europe)
- Teams: 36 (league stage); 2 (finalists)
- Current champions: (England) Aston Villa (1st title)
- Most championships: (Spain) Sevilla (7 titles)
- 2026 UEFA Europa League final

The UEFA Europa League, formerly the UEFA Cup, is an association football competition established in 1971 by UEFA. It is considered the second most important international competition for European clubs, after the UEFA Champions League. Clubs qualify for the Europa League based on their performance in national leagues and cup competitions. For the first 25 years of the competition, the final was contested over two legs, one at each participating club's stadium, but in 1998, Inter Milan defeated Lazio in the competition's first single-legged final held at a neutral venue, the Parc des Princes in Paris. Tottenham Hotspur won the inaugural competition in 1972, defeating Wolverhampton Wanderers 3–2 on aggregate. Eleven finals have featured teams from the same national association: Italy (1990, 1991, 1995 and 1998), England (1972, 2019 and 2025), Spain (2007 and 2012), Germany (1980) and Portugal (2011).

Sevilla holds the record for the most victories, having won the competition seven times since its inception. Real Madrid (winners in 1985 and 1986) and Sevilla (winners in 2006 and 2007, and 2014, 2015 and 2016) are the only teams to have retained their title. The competition has been won fourteen times by teams from Spain, more than any other country. The last champions before the UEFA Cup was renamed to UEFA Europa League were Shakhtar Donetsk, who beat Werder Bremen 2–1 after extra time in the 2009 final. Benfica and Marseille have lost the most finals, with three losses in the competition. The current champions are Aston Villa, who defeated SC Freiburg 3–0 in the 2026 final.

While the Inter-Cities Fairs Cup is considered to be the predecessor to the UEFA Cup, UEFA does not recognise the Fairs Cup as one of its official club competitions, and therefore its records are not included in the list.

== List of finals ==
Key
†	Match went to extra time
*	Match won on a penalty shoot-out
§	Match won by a golden goal
#	Team won on away goals

- The two-legged finals are listed in the order they were played.

UEFA Cup and Europa League finals
Season	Country	Winners	Score	Runners-up	Country	Venue	Attendance
Two-legged format
1971–72	England	Tottenham Hotspur	2–1	Wolverhampton Wanderers	England	Molineux, Wolverhampton, England	45,000
1971–72	England	Tottenham Hotspur	1–1	Wolverhampton Wanderers	England	White Hart Lane, London, England	54,000
1972–73	England	Liverpool	3–0	Borussia Mönchengladbach	West Germany	Anfield, Liverpool, England	41,169
1972–73	England	Liverpool	0–2	Borussia Mönchengladbach	West Germany	Bökelbergstadion, Mönchengladbach, West Germany	35,000
1973–74	Netherlands	Feyenoord	2–2	Tottenham Hotspur	England	White Hart Lane, London, England	46,281
1973–74	Netherlands	Feyenoord	2–0	Tottenham Hotspur	England	De Kuip, Rotterdam, Netherlands	59,000
1974–75	West Germany	Borussia Mönchengladbach	0–0	Twente	Netherlands	Rheinstadion, Düsseldorf, West Germany	42,000
1974–75	West Germany	Borussia Mönchengladbach	5–1	Twente	Netherlands	Diekman Stadion, Enschede, Netherlands	21,000
1975–76	England	Liverpool	3–2	Club Brugge	Belgium	Anfield, Liverpool, England	56,000
1975–76	England	Liverpool	1–1	Club Brugge	Belgium	Olympiastadion, Bruges, Belgium	32,000
1976–77	Italy	Juventus^{#}	1–0	Athletic Bilbao	Spain	Stadio Comunale, Turin, Italy	75,000
1976–77	Italy	Juventus^{#}	1–2	Athletic Bilbao	Spain	San Mamés, Bilbao, Spain	43,000
1977–78	Netherlands	PSV Eindhoven	0–0	Bastia	France	Stade Armand Cesari, Bastia, France	15,000
1977–78	Netherlands	PSV Eindhoven	3–0	Bastia	France	Philips Stadion, Eindhoven, Netherlands	27,000
1978–79	West Germany	Borussia Mönchengladbach	1–1	Red Star Belgrade	Yugoslavia	Stadion Crvena Zvezda, Belgrade, SFR Yugoslavia	87,000
1978–79	West Germany	Borussia Mönchengladbach	1–0	Red Star Belgrade	Yugoslavia	Rheinstadion, Düsseldorf, West Germany	45,000
1979–80	West Germany	Eintracht Frankfurt^{#}	2–3	Borussia Mönchengladbach	West Germany	Bökelbergstadion, Mönchengladbach, West Germany	25,000
1979–80	West Germany	Eintracht Frankfurt^{#}	1–0	Borussia Mönchengladbach	West Germany	Waldstadion, Frankfurt, West Germany	59,000
1980–81	England	Ipswich Town	3–0	AZ	Netherlands	Portman Road, Ipswich, England	27,532
1980–81	England	Ipswich Town	2–4	AZ	Netherlands	Olympisch Stadion, Amsterdam, Netherlands	28,500
1981–82	Sweden	IFK Göteborg	1–0	Hamburger SV	West Germany	Nya Ullevi, Gothenburg, Sweden	42,548
1981–82	Sweden	IFK Göteborg	3–0	Hamburger SV	West Germany	Volksparkstadion, Hamburg, West Germany	60,000
1982–83	Belgium	Anderlecht	1–0	Benfica	Portugal	Heysel Stadium, Brussels, Belgium	55,000
1982–83	Belgium	Anderlecht	1–1	Benfica	Portugal	Estádio da Luz, Lisbon, Portugal	80,000
1983–84	England	Tottenham Hotspur	1–1	Anderlecht	Belgium	Constant Vanden Stock, Brussels, Belgium	40,000
1983–84	England	Tottenham Hotspur	1–1* (Note: The score was 1–1 after 90 minutes and extra time. Tottenham Hotspur won the penalty shoot-out 4–3.)	Anderlecht	Belgium	White Hart Lane, London, England	46,205
1984–85	Spain	Real Madrid	3–0	Videoton	Hungary	Sóstói Stadion, Székesfehérvár, Hungary	30,000
1984–85	Spain	Real Madrid	0–1	Videoton	Hungary	Santiago Bernabéu, Madrid, Spain	90,000
1985–86	Spain	Real Madrid	5–1	1. FC Köln	West Germany	Santiago Bernabéu, Madrid, Spain	85,000
1985–86	Spain	Real Madrid	0–2	1. FC Köln	West Germany	Olympiastadion, Berlin, West Germany	15,000
1986–87	Sweden	IFK Göteborg	1–0	Dundee United	Scotland	Nya Ullevi, Gothenburg, Sweden	50,023
1986–87	Sweden	IFK Göteborg	1–1	Dundee United	Scotland	Tannadice Park, Dundee, Scotland	20,911
1987–88	West Germany	Bayer Leverkusen	0–3	Espanyol	Spain	Estadi de Sarrià, Barcelona, Spain	42,000
1987–88	West Germany	Bayer Leverkusen	3–0* (Note: The score was 3–0 after 90 minutes and extra time. Bayer Leverkusen won the penalty shoot-out 3–2.)	Espanyol	Spain	Ulrich Haberland Stadion, Leverkusen, West Germany	22,000
1988–89	Italy	Napoli	2–1	VfB Stuttgart	West Germany	Stadio San Paolo, Naples, Italy	83,000
1988–89	Italy	Napoli	3–3	VfB Stuttgart	West Germany	Neckarstadion, Stuttgart, West Germany	67,000
1989–90	Italy	Juventus	3–1	Fiorentina	Italy	Stadio Comunale, Turin, Italy	45,000
1989–90	Italy	Juventus	0–0	Fiorentina	Italy	Stadio Partenio, Avellino, Italy	32,000
1990–91	Italy	Inter Milan	2–0	Roma	Italy	San Siro, Milan, Italy	68,887
1990–91	Italy	Inter Milan	0–1	Roma	Italy	Stadio Olimpico, Rome, Italy	70,901
1991–92	Netherlands	Ajax^{#}	2–2	Torino	Italy	Stadio delle Alpi, Turin, Italy	65,377
1991–92	Netherlands	Ajax^{#}	0–0	Torino	Italy	Olympisch Stadion, Amsterdam, Netherlands	42,000
1992–93	Italy	Juventus	3–1	Borussia Dortmund	Germany	Westfalenstadion, Dortmund, Germany	37,000
1992–93	Italy	Juventus	3–0	Borussia Dortmund	Germany	Stadio delle Alpi, Turin, Italy	62,781
1993–94	Italy	Inter Milan	1–0	Austria Salzburg	Austria	Ernst-Happel-Stadion, Vienna, Austria	47,500
1993–94	Italy	Inter Milan	1–0	Austria Salzburg	Austria	San Siro, Milan, Italy	80,326
1994–95	Italy	Parma	1–0	Juventus	Italy	Stadio Ennio Tardini, Parma, Italy	22,062
1994–95	Italy	Parma	1–1	Juventus	Italy	San Siro, Milan, Italy	80,754
1995–96	Germany	Bayern Munich	2–0	Bordeaux	France	Olympiastadion, Munich, Germany	62,000
1995–96	Germany	Bayern Munich	3–1	Bordeaux	France	Parc Lescure, Bordeaux, France	36,000
1996–97	Germany	Schalke 04	1–0	Inter Milan	Italy	Parkstadion, Gelsenkirchen, Germany	56,000
1996–97	Germany	Schalke 04	0–1* (Note: The score was 0–1 after 90 minutes and extra time. Schalke 04 won the penalty shoot-out 4–1.)	Inter Milan	Italy	San Siro, Milan, Italy	83,000
Single match format
1997–98	Italy	Inter Milan	3–0	Lazio	Italy	Parc des Princes, Paris, France	44,412
1998–99	Italy	Parma	3–0	Marseille	France	Luzhniki Stadium, Moscow, Russia	61,000
1999–2000	Turkey	Galatasaray	0–0* (Note: The score was 0–0 after 90 minutes and extra time. Galatasaray won the penalty shoot-out 4–1.)	Arsenal	England	Parken Stadium, Copenhagen, Denmark	38,919
2000–01	England	Liverpool	5–4^{§} (Note: The score was 4–4 after 90 minutes. Liverpool scored the golden goal in the 26th minute of extra time.)	Alavés	Spain	Westfalenstadion, Dortmund, Germany	48,050
2001–02	Netherlands	Feyenoord	3–2	Borussia Dortmund	Germany	De Kuip, Rotterdam, Netherlands	45,611
2002–03	Portugal	Porto	3–2^{†} (Note: The score was 2–2 after 90 minutes.)	Celtic	Scotland	Estadio Olímpico de Sevilla, Seville, Spain	52,972
2003–04	Spain	Valencia	2–0	Marseille	France	Nya Ullevi, Gothenburg, Sweden	39,000
2004–05	Russia	CSKA Moscow	3–1	Sporting CP	Portugal	Estádio José Alvalade, Lisbon, Portugal	47,085
2005–06	Spain	Sevilla	4–0	Middlesbrough	England	Philips Stadion, Eindhoven, Netherlands	33,100
2006–07	Spain	Sevilla	2–2* (Note: The score was 2–2 after 90 minutes and extra time. Sevilla won the penalty shoot-out 3–1.)	Espanyol	Spain	Hampden Park, Glasgow, Scotland	47,602
2007–08	Russia	Zenit Saint Petersburg	2–0	Rangers	Scotland	City of Manchester Stadium, Manchester, England	43,878
2008–09	Ukraine	Shakhtar Donetsk	2–1^{†} (Note: The score was 1–1 after 90 minutes.)	Werder Bremen	Germany	Şükrü Saracoğlu Stadium, Istanbul, Turkey	37,357
2009–10	Spain	Atlético Madrid	2–1^{†} (Note: The score was 1–1 after 90 minutes.)	Fulham	England	Volksparkstadion, Hamburg, Germany	49,000
2010–11	Portugal	Porto	1–0	Braga	Portugal	Lansdowne Road Stadium, Dublin, Republic of Ireland	45,391
2011–12	Spain	Atlético Madrid	3–0	Athletic Bilbao	Spain	Arena Națională, Bucharest, Romania	52,347
2012–13	England	Chelsea	2–1	Benfica	Portugal	Amsterdam Arena, Amsterdam, Netherlands	46,163
2013–14	Spain	Sevilla	0–0* (Note: The score was 0–0 after 90 minutes and extra time. Sevilla won the penalty shoot-out 4–2.)	Benfica	Portugal	Juventus Stadium, Turin, Italy	33,120
2014–15	Spain	Sevilla	3–2	Dnipro Dnipropetrovsk	Ukraine	National Stadium, Warsaw, Poland	45,000
2015–16	Spain	Sevilla	3–1	Liverpool	England	St. Jakob-Park, Basel, Switzerland	34,429
2016–17	England	Manchester United	2–0	Ajax	Netherlands	Friends Arena, Solna, Sweden	46,961
2017–18	Spain	Atlético Madrid	3–0	Marseille	France	Parc Olympique Lyonnais, Décines-Charpieu, France	55,768
2018–19	England	Chelsea	4–1	Arsenal	England	Olympic Stadium, Baku, Azerbaijan	51,370
2019–20	Spain	Sevilla	3–2	Inter Milan	Italy	Stadion Köln, Cologne, Germany	0 (Note: The 2020 final was played behind closed doors due to the COVID-19 pandemic in Europe.)
2020–21	Spain	Villarreal	1–1* (Note: The score was 1–1 after 90 minutes and extra time. Villarreal won the penalty shoot-out 11–10.)	Manchester United	England	Stadion Gdańsk, Gdańsk, Poland	9,412 (Note: The 2021 final was played with limited capacity due to the COVID-19 pandemic in Europe.)
2021–22	Germany	Eintracht Frankfurt	1–1* (Note: The score was 1–1 after 90 minutes and extra time. Eintracht Frankfurt won the penalty shoot-out 5–4.)	Rangers	Scotland	Ramón Sánchez Pizjuán, Seville, Spain	38,842
2022–23	Spain	Sevilla	1–1* (Note: The score was 1–1 after 90 minutes and extra time. Sevilla won the penalty shoot-out 4–1.)	Roma	Italy	Puskás Aréna, Budapest, Hungary	61,476
2023–24	Italy	Atalanta	3–0	Bayer Leverkusen	Germany	Dublin Arena, Dublin, Republic of Ireland	47,135
2024–25	England	Tottenham Hotspur	1–0	Manchester United	England	San Mamés, Bilbao, Spain	49,224
2025–26	England	Aston Villa	3–0	SC Freiburg	Germany	Beşiktaş Stadium, Istanbul, Turkey	37,324

Upcoming final(s)
Season	Country	Finalist	Match	Finalist	Country	Venue
2026–27			v			Waldstadion, Frankfurt, Germany
2027–28			v			Arena Națională, Bucharest, Romania
2028–29			v			National Stadium, Belgrade, Serbia

== Performances ==
=== By club ===
Performance in the UEFA Cup and UEFA Europa League by club
Club	Winners	Runners-up	Years won	Years runner-up
(Spain) Sevilla	7	0	2006, 2007, 2014, 2015, 2016, 2020, 2023	—
(Italy) Inter Milan	3	2	1991, 1994, 1998	1997, 2020
(England) Tottenham Hotspur	3	1	1972, 1984, 2025	1974
(England) Liverpool	3	1	1973, 1976, 2001	2016
(Italy) Juventus	3	1	1977, 1990, 1993	1995
(Spain) Atlético Madrid	3	0	2010, 2012, 2018	—
(Germany) Borussia Mönchengladbach	2	2	1975, 1979	1973, 1980
(Netherlands) Feyenoord	2	0	1974, 2002	—
(Germany) Eintracht Frankfurt	2	0	1980, 2022	—
(Sweden) IFK Göteborg	2	0	1982, 1987	—
(Spain) Real Madrid	2	0	1985, 1986	—
(Italy) Parma	2	0	1995, 1999	—
(Portugal) Porto	2	0	2003, 2011	—
(England) Chelsea	2	0	2013, 2019	—
(England) Manchester United	1	2	2017	2021, 2025
(Belgium) Anderlecht	1	1	1983	1984
(Germany) Bayer Leverkusen	1	1	1988	2024
(Netherlands) Ajax	1	1	1992	2017
(Netherlands) PSV Eindhoven	1	0	1978	—
(England) Ipswich Town	1	0	1981	—
(Italy) Napoli	1	0	1989	—
(Germany) Bayern Munich	1	0	1996	—
(Germany) Schalke 04	1	0	1997	—
(Turkey) Galatasaray	1	0	2000	—
(Spain) Valencia	1	0	2004	—
(Russia) CSKA Moscow	1	0	2005	—
(Russia) Zenit Saint Petersburg	1	0	2008	—
(Ukraine) Shakhtar Donetsk	1	0	2009	—
(Spain) Villarreal	1	0	2021	—
(Italy) Atalanta	1	0	2024	—
(England) Aston Villa	1	0	2026	—
(Portugal) Benfica	0	3	—	1983, 2013, 2014
(France) Marseille	0	3	—	1999, 2004, 2018
(Spain) Athletic Bilbao	0	2	—	1977, 2012
(Spain) Espanyol	0	2	—	1988, 2007
(Italy) Roma	0	2	—	1991, 2023
(Germany) Borussia Dortmund	0	2	—	1993, 2002
(England) Arsenal	0	2	—	2000, 2019
(Scotland) Rangers	0	2	—	2008, 2022
(England) Wolverhampton Wanderers	0	1	—	1972
(Netherlands) Twente	0	1	—	1975
(Belgium) Club Brugge	0	1	—	1976
(France) Bastia	0	1	—	1978
(Socialist Federal Republic of Yugoslavia) Red Star Belgrade	0	1	—	1979
(Netherlands) AZ	0	1	—	1981
(Germany) Hamburger SV	0	1	—	1982
(Hungary) Videoton	0	1	—	1985
(Germany) 1. FC Köln	0	1	—	1986
(Scotland) Dundee United	0	1	—	1987
(Germany) VfB Stuttgart	0	1	—	1989
(Italy) Fiorentina	0	1	—	1990
(Italy) Torino	0	1	—	1992
Austria Salzburg	0	1	—	1994
(France) Bordeaux	0	1	—	1996
(Italy) Lazio	0	1	—	1998
(Spain) Alavés	0	1	—	2001
(Scotland) Celtic	0	1	—	2003
(Portugal) Sporting CP	0	1	—	2005
(England) Middlesbrough	0	1	—	2006
(Germany) Werder Bremen	0	1	—	2009
(England) Fulham	0	1	—	2010
(Portugal) Braga	0	1	—	2011
(Ukraine) Dnipro Dnipropetrovsk	0	1	—	2015
(Germany) SC Freiburg	0	1	—	2026

=== By nation ===
Performance in finals by nation
Nation	Winners	Runners-up	Total
Spain	14	5	19
England	11	9	20
Italy	10	8	18
Germany (Note: Includes clubs representing West Germany. No clubs representing East Germany appeared in a final.)	7	10	17
Netherlands	4	3	7
Portugal	2	5	7
Russia	2	0	2
Sweden	2	0	2
Belgium	1	2	3
Ukraine	1	1	2
Turkey	1	0	1
France	0	5	5
Scotland	0	4	4
Austria	0	1	1
Hungary	0	1	1
Yugoslavia (Note: The Yugoslav final appearance was by a club from SR Serbia.)	0	1	1

=== Finals between teams from the same nation ===
Nation	Finals	Years
Italy	4	1990, 1991, 1995, 1998
England	3	1972, 2019, 2025
Spain	2	2007, 2012
Germany	1	1980
Portugal	1	2011

== See also ==
- List of European Cup and UEFA Champions League finals
- List of UEFA Cup and Europa League–winning managers
- List of UEFA Conference League finals
- List of UEFA Cup Winners' Cup finals
- List of UEFA Intertoto Cup winners
- List of UEFA Super Cup matches
