= 2029 UEFA Champions League final =

Association football match

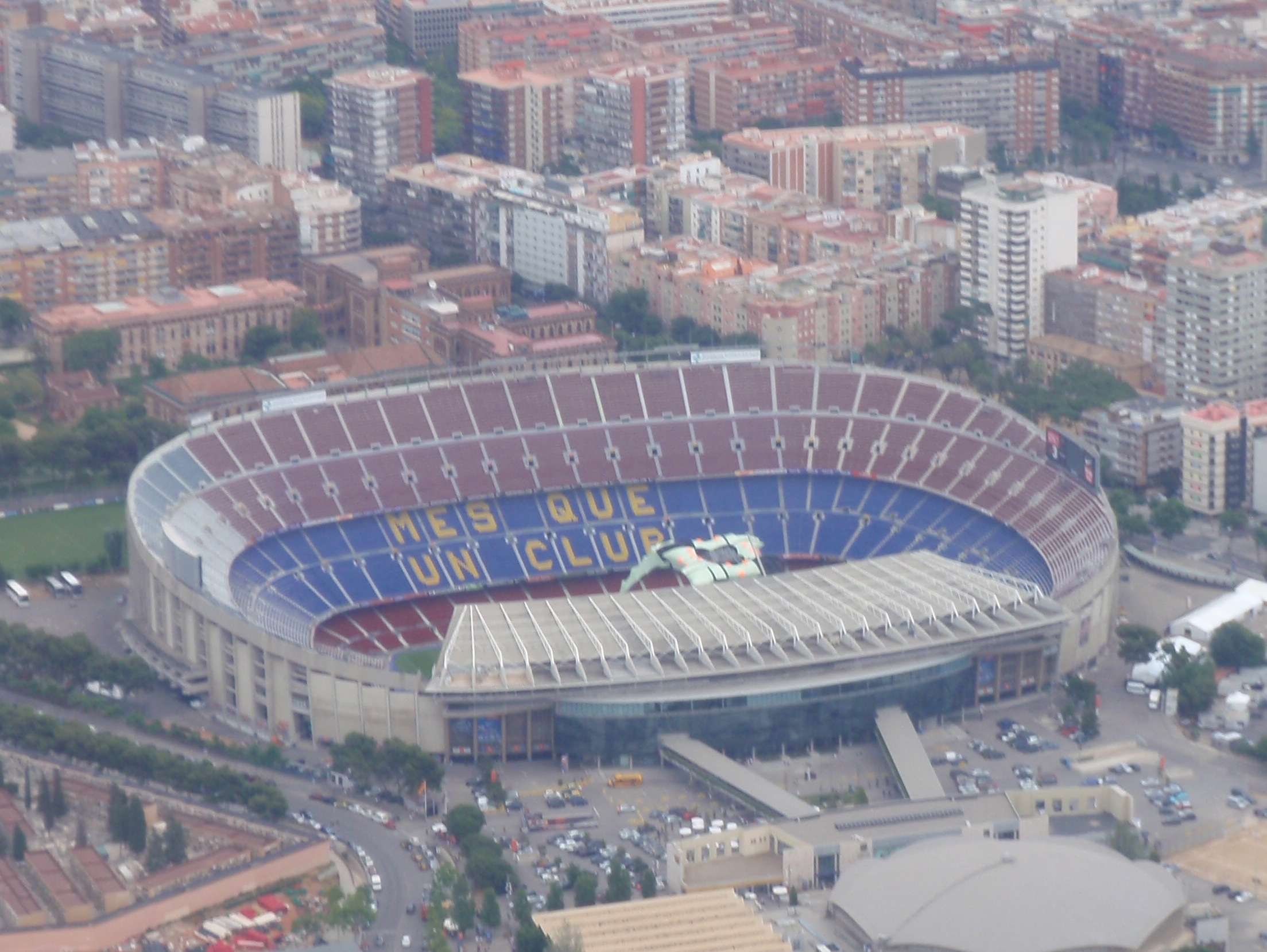
- The Camp Nou in Barcelona will host the final.
- Event: 2028–29 UEFA Champions League
- Date: 2 June 2029
- Venue: Camp Nou, Barcelona

The 2029 UEFA Champions League final will be the final match of the 2028–29 UEFA Champions League, the 74th season of Europe's premier club football tournament organised by UEFA, and the 37th season since it was renamed from the European Champion Clubs' Cup to the UEFA Champions League. It will be played at the Camp Nou in Barcelona, Spain, on 2 June 2029.

The winners will earn the right to play against the winners of the 2028–29 UEFA Europa League in the 2029 UEFA Super Cup, compete in the final of the 2029 FIFA Intercontinental Cup, and qualify for the 2033 FIFA Club World Cup. The winners will also qualify to enter the league phase of the 2029–30 UEFA Champions League, unless they have already qualified for the Champions League through their league performance (in which case the access list will be rebalanced).

== Host selection ==
On 11 July 2025, UEFA opened the bidding process for the final, which is being held in parallel with that of the 2028 final. Interested bidders can bid for either one or both of the finals. Additionally, bidding associations can only be appointed one UEFA final in a given year. The proposed venues have to include natural grass and be ranked as a UEFA category four stadium, with a gross capacity of at least 70,000 (with a tolerance of 10% below). The bidding timeline is as follows:

- 11 July 2025: Applications formally invited
- 22 October 2025: Closing date for registering intention to bid
- 24 October 2025: Bid requirements made available to bidders
- 4 February 2026: Submission of preliminary bid dossier
- 10 June 2026: Submission of final bid dossier
- 15 September 2026: Appointment of host

UEFA announced on 31 October 2025 that three associations had expressed interest in hosting the 2029 final.

Bidding associations for 2029 UEFA Champions League final
Association	Stadium	City	Capacity
England	Wembley Stadium	London	90,000
Spain	Camp Nou	Barcelona	105,000
Germany	Westfalenstadion	Dortmund	81,365

Camp Nou was selected as the venue by the UEFA Executive Committee during their meeting in Thessaloniki, Greece, on 15 September 2026.

== Match ==
=== Details ===
The winner of semi-final 1 will be designated as the "home" team for administrative purposes.

2 June 2029
18:00 UTC+2

Winner SF1	v	Winner SF2

Camp Nou, Barcelona

Match rules

- 90 minutes
- 30 minutes of extra time if necessary
- Penalty shoot-out if scores still level
- Maximum of twelve named substitutes
- Maximum of five substitutions, with a sixth allowed in extra time
- Maximum of three substitution opportunities, with a fourth allowed in extra time

== See also ==
- 2029 UEFA Europa League final
- 2029 UEFA Conference League final
- 2029 UEFA Women's Champions League final
