= 2028 UEFA Champions League final =

Association football match

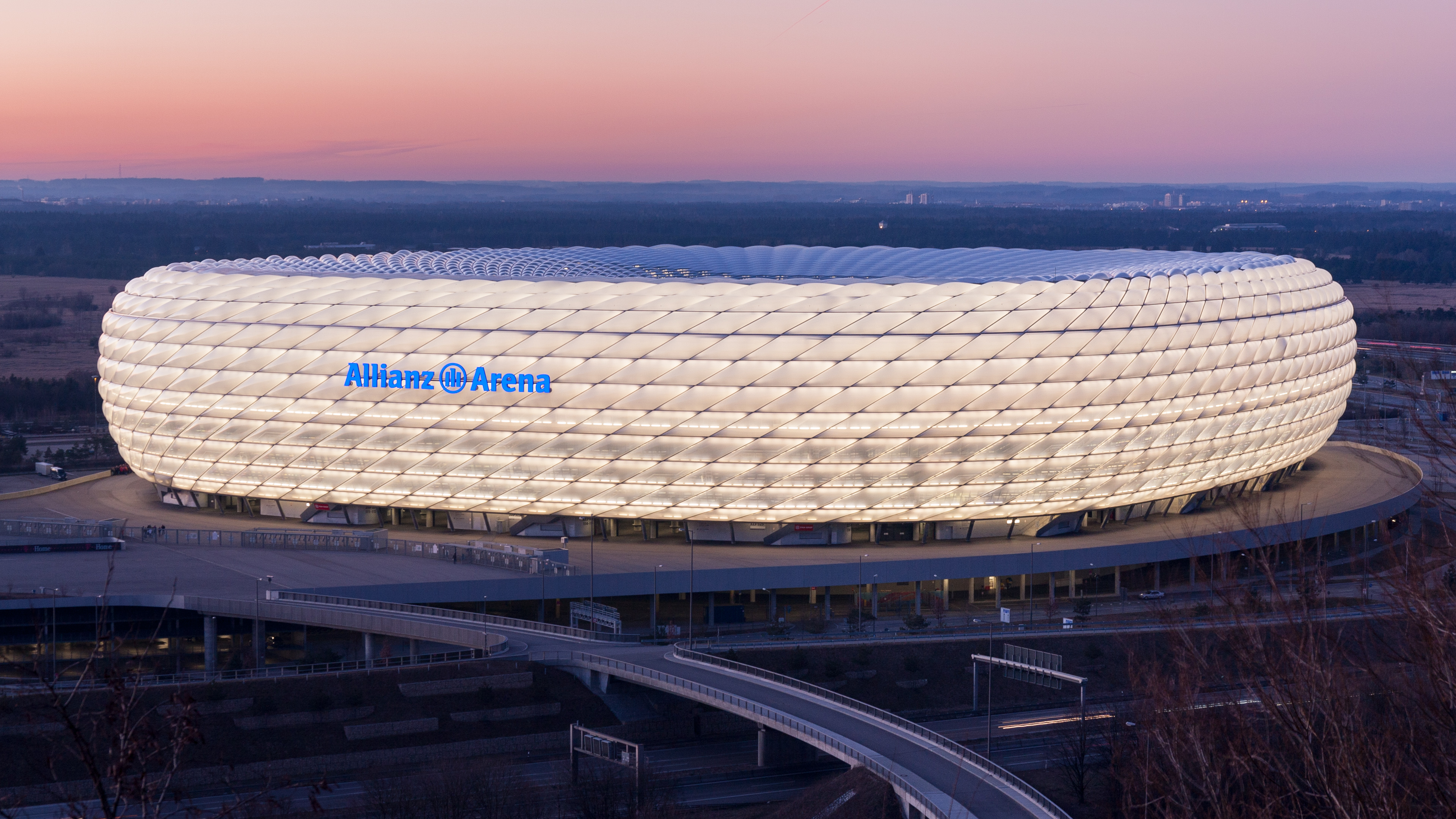
- The Munich Football Arena in Munich will host the final.
- Event: 2027–28 UEFA Champions League
- Date: 27 May 2028
- Venue: Munich Football Arena, Munich

The 2028 UEFA Champions League final will be the final match of the 2027–28 UEFA Champions League, the 73rd season of Europe's premier club football tournament organised by UEFA, and the 36th season since it was renamed from the European Champion Clubs' Cup to the UEFA Champions League. It will be played at the Munich Football Arena in Munich, Germany, on 27 May 2028.

The winners will earn the right to play against the winners of the 2027–28 UEFA Europa League in the 2028 UEFA Super Cup, compete in the final of the 2028 FIFA Intercontinental Cup, and qualify for the 2029 FIFA Club World Cup. The winners will also qualify to enter the league phase of the 2028–29 UEFA Champions League, unless they have already qualified for the Champions League through their league performance (in which case the access list will be rebalanced).

== Host selection ==
On 11 July 2025, UEFA opened the bidding process for the final, which is being held in parallel with that of the 2029 final. Interested bidders can bid for either one or both of the finals. Additionally, bidding associations can only be appointed one UEFA final in a given year. The proposed venues have to include natural grass and be ranked as a UEFA category four stadium, with a gross capacity of at least 70,000 (with a tolerance of 10% below). The bidding timeline is as follows:

- 11 July 2025: Applications formally invited
- 22 October 2025: Closing date for registering intention to bid
- 24 October 2025: Bid requirements made available to bidders
- 4 February 2026: Submission of preliminary bid dossier
- 10 June 2026: Submission of final bid dossier
- 15 September 2026: Appointment of host

UEFA announced on 31 October 2025 that one association had expressed interest in hosting the 2028 final.

Bidding associations for 2028 UEFA Champions League final
Association	Stadium	City	Capacity
Germany	Munich Football Arena	Munich	70,000

Allianz Arena was selected as the venue by the UEFA Executive Committee during their meeting in Thessaloniki, Greece, on 15 September 2026.

== Match ==
=== Details ===
The winner of semi-final 1 will be designated as the "home" team for administrative purposes.

27 May 2028
18:00 UTC+2

Winner SF1	v	Winner SF2

Munich Football Arena, Munich

Match rules

- 90 minutes
- 30 minutes of extra time if necessary
- Penalty shoot-out if scores still level
- Maximum of twelve named substitutes
- Maximum of five substitutions, with a sixth allowed in extra time
- Maximum of three substitution opportunities, with a fourth allowed in extra time

== See also ==
- 2028 UEFA Europa League final
- 2028 UEFA Conference League final
- 2028 UEFA Women's Champions League final
