= 2029 UEFA Women's Champions League final =

Association football match

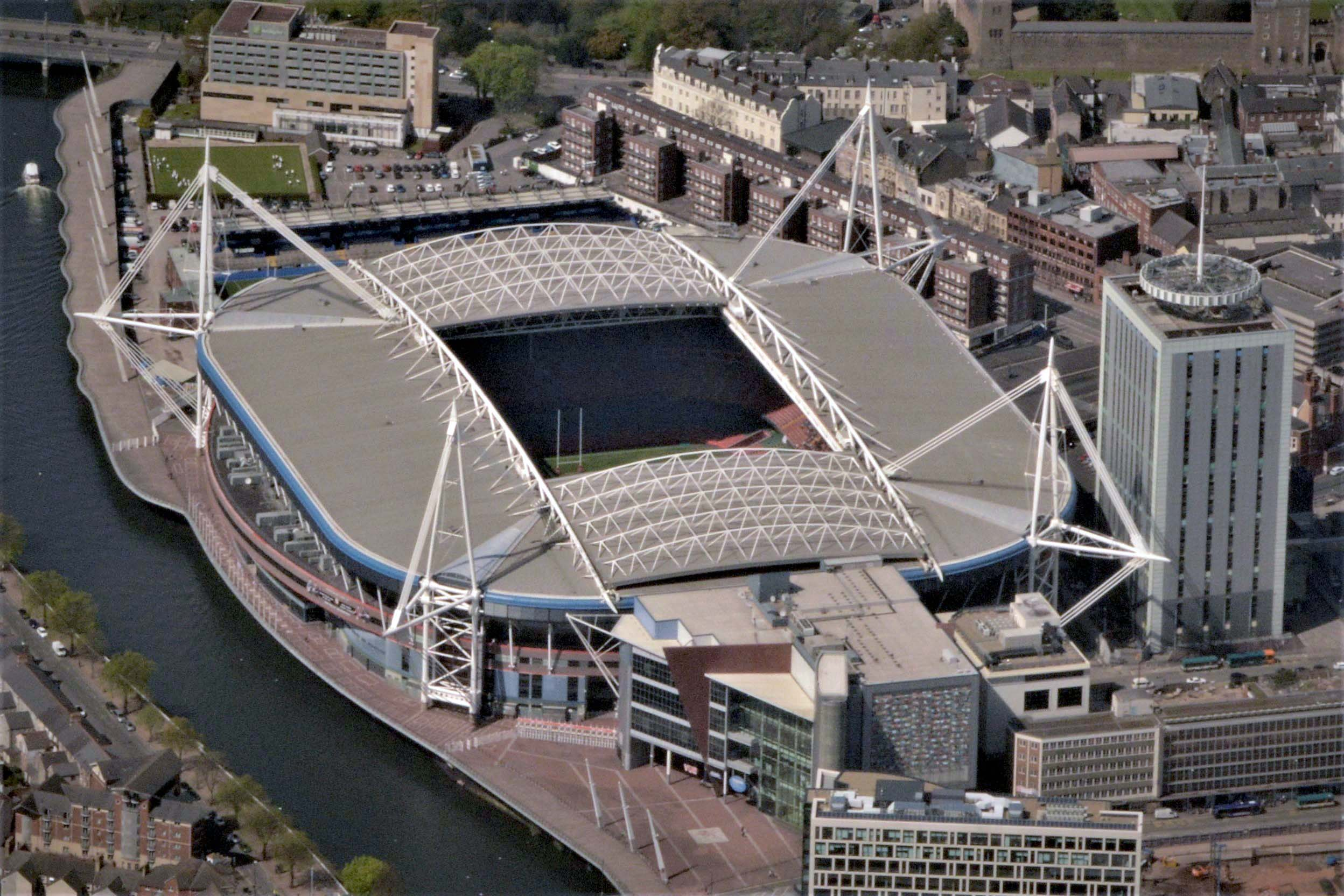
- The Millennium Stadium in Cardiff will host the final.
- Event: 2028–29 UEFA Women's Champions League
- Date: 25–27 May 2029
- Venue: Millennium Stadium, Cardiff

The 2029 UEFA Women's Champions League final will be the final match of the 2028–29 UEFA Women's Champions League, the 28th season of Europe's premier women's club football tournament organised by UEFA, and the 20th season since it was renamed from the UEFA Women's Cup to the UEFA Women's Champions League. It is scheduled to be played on 25, 26 or 27 May 2029.

The winners will qualify to enter the league phase of the 2029–30 UEFA Women's Champions League, unless they have already qualified for the Champions League through their league performance (in which case the access list will be rebalanced).

== Host selection ==
On 11 July 2025, UEFA opened the bidding process for the final, which is being held in parallel with that of the 2028 final. Interested bidders can bid for either one or both of the finals. Additionally, bidding associations can only be appointed one UEFA final in a given year. The proposed venues have to include natural grass and be ranked as a UEFA category four stadium, with a gross capacity of 30,000 to 60,000. The bidding timeline is as follows:

- 11 July 2025: Applications formally invited
- 22 October 2025: Closing date for registering intention to bid
- 24 October 2025: Bid requirements made available to bidders
- 4 February 2026: Submission of preliminary bid dossier
- 10 June 2026: Submission of final bid dossier
- 15 September 2026: Appointment of host

UEFA announced on 31 October 2025 that four associations had expressed interest in hosting the 2029 final.

Bidding associations for 2029 UEFA Women's Champions League final
Association	Stadium	City	Capacity	Notes
France	Parc Olympique Lyonnais	Décines-Charpieu	59,186	Stadium also bid for 2028 Women's Champions League final Parc Olympique Lyonnais or Parc des Princes also bid for 2028 or 2029 Europa League finals Association also bid for 2028 or 2029 Conference League finals
Republic of Ireland	Aviva Stadium	Dublin	51,711	
Switzerland	St. Jakob-Park	Basel	37,500	Stadium also bid for 2028 Women's Champions League final
Wales	Millennium Stadium	Cardiff	73,931	

== Match ==
=== Details ===
The winner of semi-final 1 will be designated as the "home" team for administrative purposes.

25–27 May 2029
TBC UTC+2

Winner SF1	v	Winner SF2

Millennium Stadium, Cardiff

Match rules

- 90 minutes
- 30 minutes of extra time if necessary
- Penalty shoot-out if scores still level
- Maximum of twelve named substitutes
- Maximum of five substitutions, with a sixth allowed in extra time
- Maximum of three substitution opportunities, with a fourth allowed in extra time

== See also ==
- 2029 UEFA Champions League final
- 2029 UEFA Europa League final
- 2029 UEFA Conference League final
