= 2028 UEFA Europa League final =

Association football match

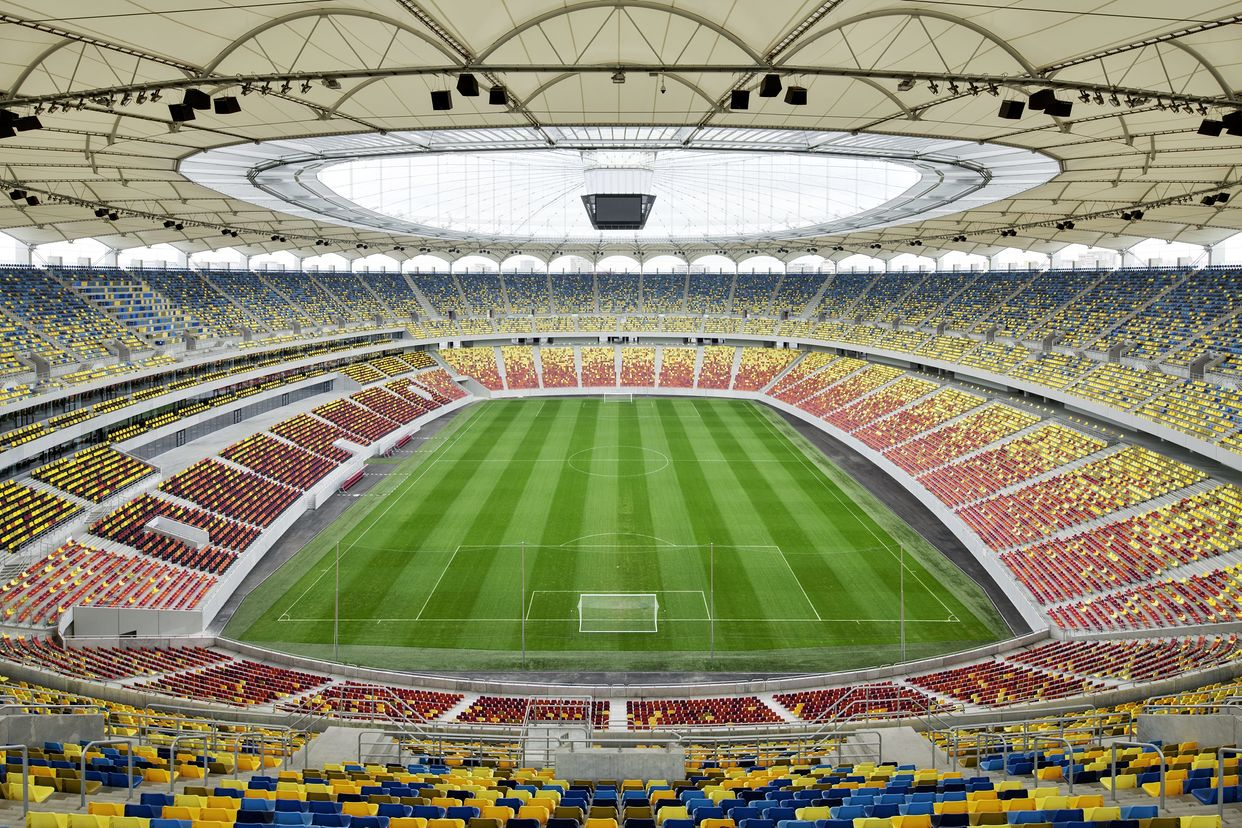
- Arena Națională in Bucharest will host the final.
- Event: 2027–28 UEFA Europa League
- Date: 17 May 2028
- Venue: Arena Națională, Bucharest

The 2028 UEFA Europa League final will be the final match of the 2027–28 UEFA Europa League, the 57th season of Europe's secondary club football tournament organised by UEFA, and the 19th season since it was renamed from the UEFA Cup to the UEFA Europa League. It is scheduled to be played on 17 May 2028.

The winners will earn the right to play against the winners of the 2027–28 UEFA Champions League in the 2028 UEFA Super Cup. The winners will also qualify to enter the league phase of the 2028–29 UEFA Champions League, unless they have already qualified for the Champions League through their league performance (in which case the access list will be rebalanced).

== Host selection ==
On 11 July 2025, UEFA opened the bidding process for the final, which is being held in parallel with that of the 2029 final. Interested bidders can bid for either one or both of the finals. Additionally, bidding associations can only be appointed one UEFA final in a given year. The proposed venues have to include natural grass and be ranked as a UEFA category four stadium, with a gross capacity of 40,000 to 60,000. The bidding timeline is as follows:

- 11 July 2025: Applications formally invited
- 22 October 2025: Closing date for registering intention to bid
- 24 October 2025: Bid requirements made available to bidders
- 4 February 2026: Submission of preliminary bid dossier
- 10 June 2026: Submission of final bid dossier
- 15 September 2026: Appointment of host

UEFA announced on 31 October 2025 that four associations had expressed interest in hosting the 2028 final.

Bidding associations for 2028 UEFA Europa League final
Association	Stadium	City	Capacity	Notes
France	Parc Olympique Lyonnais or Parc des Princes	Décines-Charpieu or Paris	59,186 or 47,929	Only one stadium will be confirmed at bid submission Both stadiums also bid for 2029 Europa League final Parc Olympique Lyonnais also bid for 2028 or 2029 Women's Champions League finals Association also bid for 2028 or 2029 Conference League finals
Italy	Juventus Stadium	Turin	41,689	Stadium also bid for 2029 Europa League and 2028 or 2029 Conference League finals
Romania	Arena Națională	Bucharest	55,634	Stadium also bid for 2029 Europa League final
Serbia	National Stadium	Belgrade	60,000	Stadium being built during bidding process Stadium also bid for 2029 Europa League final

The UEFA Executive Committee meeting was held on 15 September 2026. Arena Națională was selected as the venue by the UEFA Executive Committee during their meeting in Thessaloniki, Greece, on 15 September 2026. This will be the second time the Arena Națională will be hosting the final since having previously done so in 2012.

== Match ==
=== Details ===
The winner of semi-final 1 will be designated as the "home" team for administrative purposes.

17 May 2028
22:00 EEST

Winner SF1	v	Winner SF2

Arena Națională, Bucharest

Match rules

- 90 minutes
- 30 minutes of extra time if necessary
- Penalty shoot-out if scores still level
- Maximum of twelve named substitutes
- Maximum of five substitutions, with a sixth allowed in extra time
- Maximum of three substitution opportunities, with a fourth allowed in extra time

== See also ==
- 2028 UEFA Champions League final
- 2028 UEFA Conference League final
- 2028 UEFA Women's Champions League final
