= List of UEFA Conference League–winning managers =

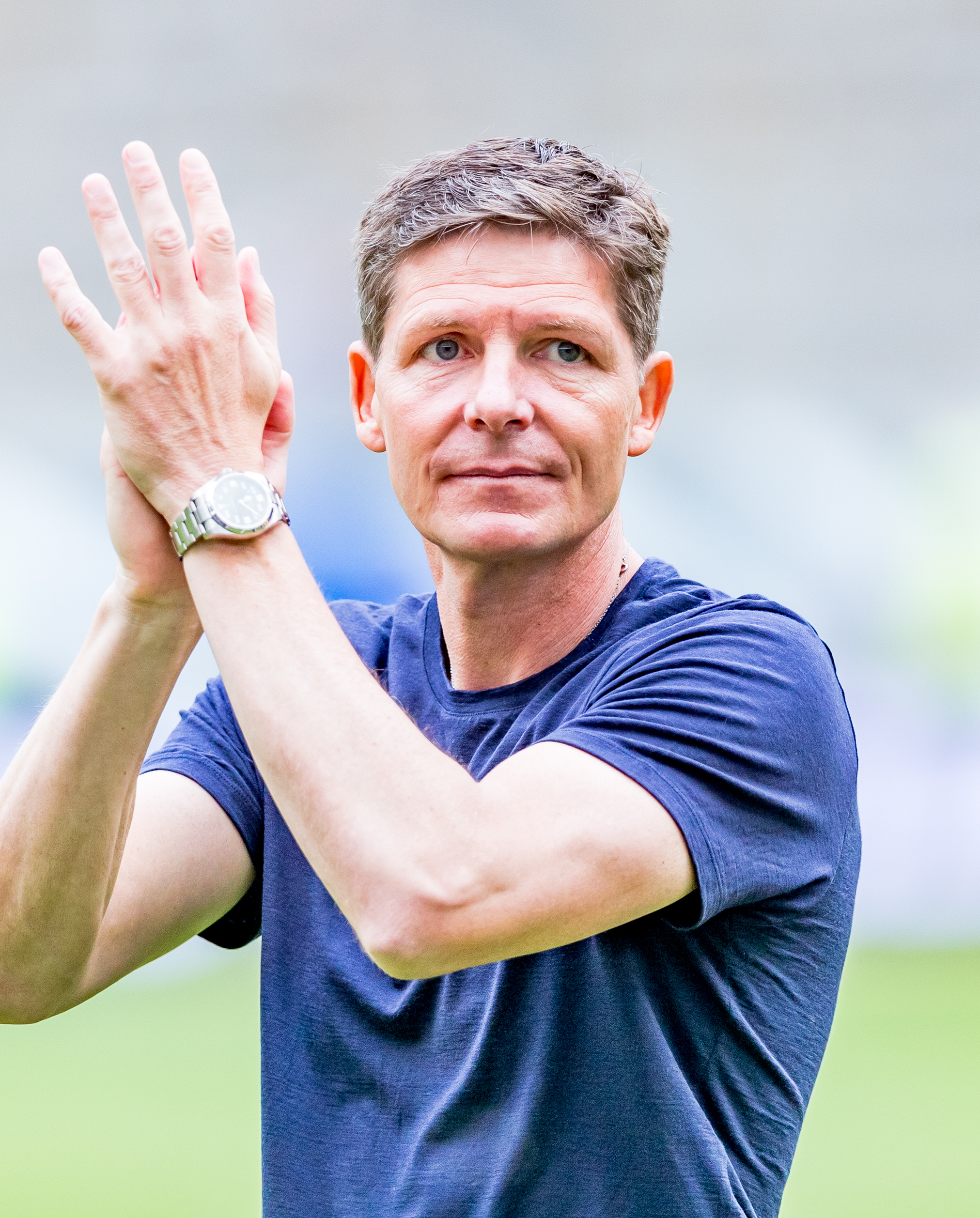
Oliver Glasner, the most recent manager to win the Conference League.

The UEFA Conference League, formerly the UEFA Europa Conference League, is a seasonal football competition established in 2021. It was created by UEFA to accommodate at least 34 of its national associations in the group stage of its competitions and is the third-tier of European football behind the UEFA Champions League and the UEFA Europa League. The role of the manager is to select the squad during the season, develop the tactics of the team and manage potential issues within the squad. Due to the prestige of winning a cup competition, the pressure on managers to succeed can be great.

The competition was announced in 2018, and began in 2021. UEFA created the competition in order to offer European competition for more clubs and have more representation from associations that might not qualify for the group stages of the Champions League or Europa League. This is determined via the UEFA country coefficients with three teams participating from nations ranked 16 to 50, two teams participating from nations ranked 6 to 15 and 51 to 55, and one team participating from nations ranked 1 to 5.

José Mourinho was the first manager to win the Conference League. He guided Roma to victory in the inaugural final in 2022. Oliver Glasner is the most recent manager to win the Conference League. He managed Crystal Palace to victory in the 2026 final against Rayo Vallecano.

== List ==
=== By year ===
UEFA Conference League winning managers
Final	Nationality	Winning manager	Nation	Club	Ref(s).
2022	Portugal	José Mourinho	Italy	Roma	
2023	Scotland	David Moyes	England	West Ham United	
2024	Spain	José Luis Mendilibar	Greece	Olympiacos	
2025	Italy	Enzo Maresca	England	Chelsea	
2026	Austria	Oliver Glasner	England	Crystal Palace	

=== By nationality ===
This table lists the total number of titles won by managers of each nationality.

UEFA Conference League winning managers by nationality
Nationality	Number of wins
Portugal	1
Scotland	1
Spain	1
Italy	1
Austria	1
