= 2028 UEFA Conference League final =

Association football match

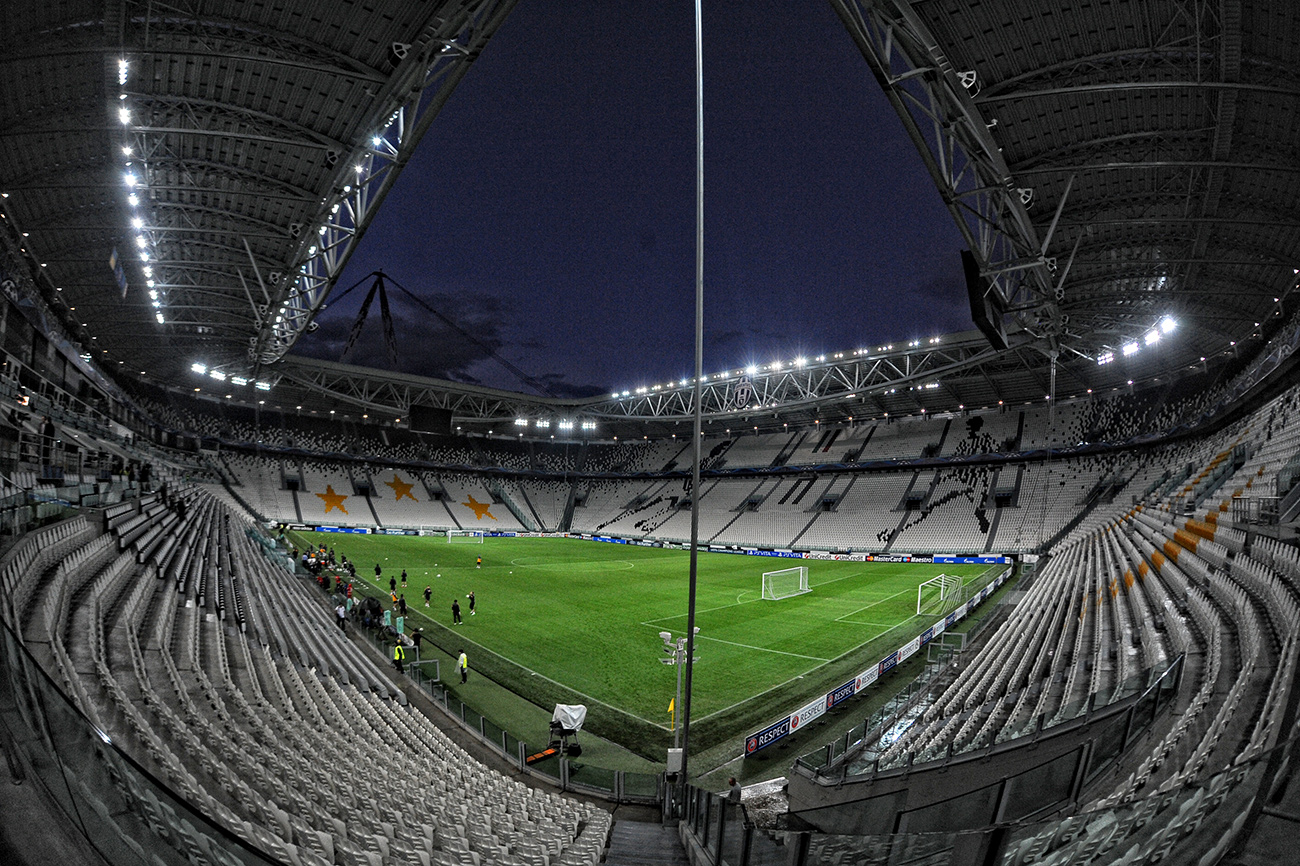
- Juventus Stadium in Turin will host the final.
- Event: 2027–28 UEFA Conference League
- Date: 24 May 2028
- Venue: Juventus Stadium, Turin

The 2028 UEFA Conference League final will be the final match of the 2027–28 UEFA Conference League, the 7th season of Europe's tertiary club football tournament organised by UEFA, and the 4th season since it was renamed from the UEFA Europa Conference League to the UEFA Conference League. It is scheduled to be played on 24 May 2028.

The winners will qualify to enter the league phase of the 2028–29 UEFA Europa League, unless they have already qualified for the Champions League or Europa League through their league performance (in which case the access list will be rebalanced).

== Host selection ==
On 11 July 2025, UEFA opened the bidding process for the final, which is being held in parallel with that of the 2029 final. Interested bidders can bid for either one or both of the finals. Additionally, bidding associations can only be appointed one UEFA final in a given year. The proposed venues have to include natural grass and be ranked as a UEFA category four stadium, with a gross capacity of 30,000 to 60,000. The bidding timeline is as follows:

- 11 July 2025: Applications formally invited
- 22 October 2025: Closing date for registering intention to bid
- 24 October 2025: Bid requirements made available to bidders
- 4 February 2026: Submission of preliminary bid dossier
- 10 June 2026: Submission of final bid dossier
- 15 September 2026: Appointment of host

UEFA announced on 31 October 2025 that five associations had expressed interest in hosting the 2028 final.

Bidding associations for 2028 UEFA Conference League final
Association	Stadium	City	Capacity	Notes
France	Stade Pierre-Mauroy	Villeneuve-d'Ascq	50,186	Stadium also bid for 2029 Conference League final Association also bid for 2028 or 2029 Europa League and 2028 or 2029 Women's Champions League finals
Hungary	Puskás Aréna	Budapest	67,215	Stadium also bid for 2029 Conference League final
Italy	Juventus Stadium	Turin	41,689	Stadium also bid for 2029 Conference League and 2028 or 2029 Europa League finals
Kazakhstan	Astana Arena or Almaty Central Stadium	Astana or Almaty	30,244 or 23,804	Only one stadium will be confirmed at bid submission Both stadiums also bid for 2029 Conference League final
Poland	Gdańsk Stadium	Gdańsk	41,620	Stadium also bid for 2029 Conference League final

== Match ==
=== Details ===
The winner of semi-final 1 will be designated as the "home" team for administrative purposes.

24 May 2028
21:00 UTC+2

Winner SF1	v	Winner SF2

Juventus Stadium,Turin

Match rules

- 90 minutes
- 30 minutes of extra time if necessary
- Penalty shoot-out if scores still level
- Maximum of twelve named substitutes
- Maximum of five substitutions, with a sixth allowed in extra time
- Maximum of three substitution opportunities, with a fourth allowed in extra time

== See also ==
- 2028 UEFA Champions League final
- 2028 UEFA Europa League final
- 2028 UEFA Women's Champions League final
