= European Champion Clubs' Cup =

Trophy awarded for winning the UEFA Champions League

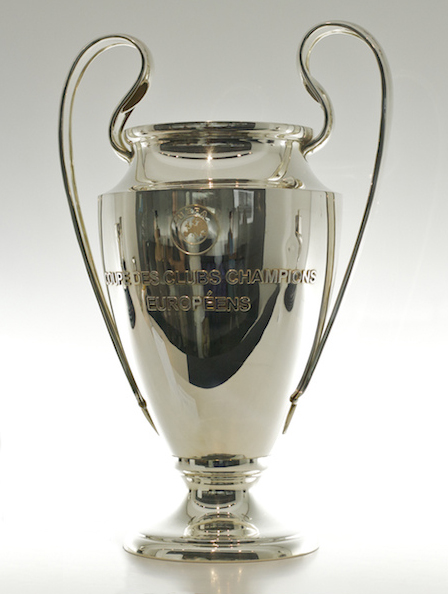
- Awarded for: Winning the UEFA Champions League
- Presented by: UEFA

History
- First award: 1956 (1967 in its current design)
- First winner: (Spain) Real Madrid (original trophy, 1956) (Scotland) Celtic (current trophy, 1967)
- Most wins: (Spain) Real Madrid (15)
- Most recent: (France) Paris Saint Germain (2)
- Website: The trophy on UEFA.com

The European Champion Clubs' Cup, also known in French as Coupe des Clubs Champions Européens, or simply the European Cup, is a trophy awarded annually by UEFA to the football club that wins the UEFA Champions League. The competition in its older format shared its name with the trophy, being also known as the European Cup, before being renamed for the 1992–93 season onwards.

There have been several official incarnations of this trophy, as a club was entitled to keep the cup after five wins or three consecutive wins, with a new cup having to be forged for the following season. During the first years of the competition, up until 1966–67 season, the trophy had a distinctly different design.

== The trophy ==
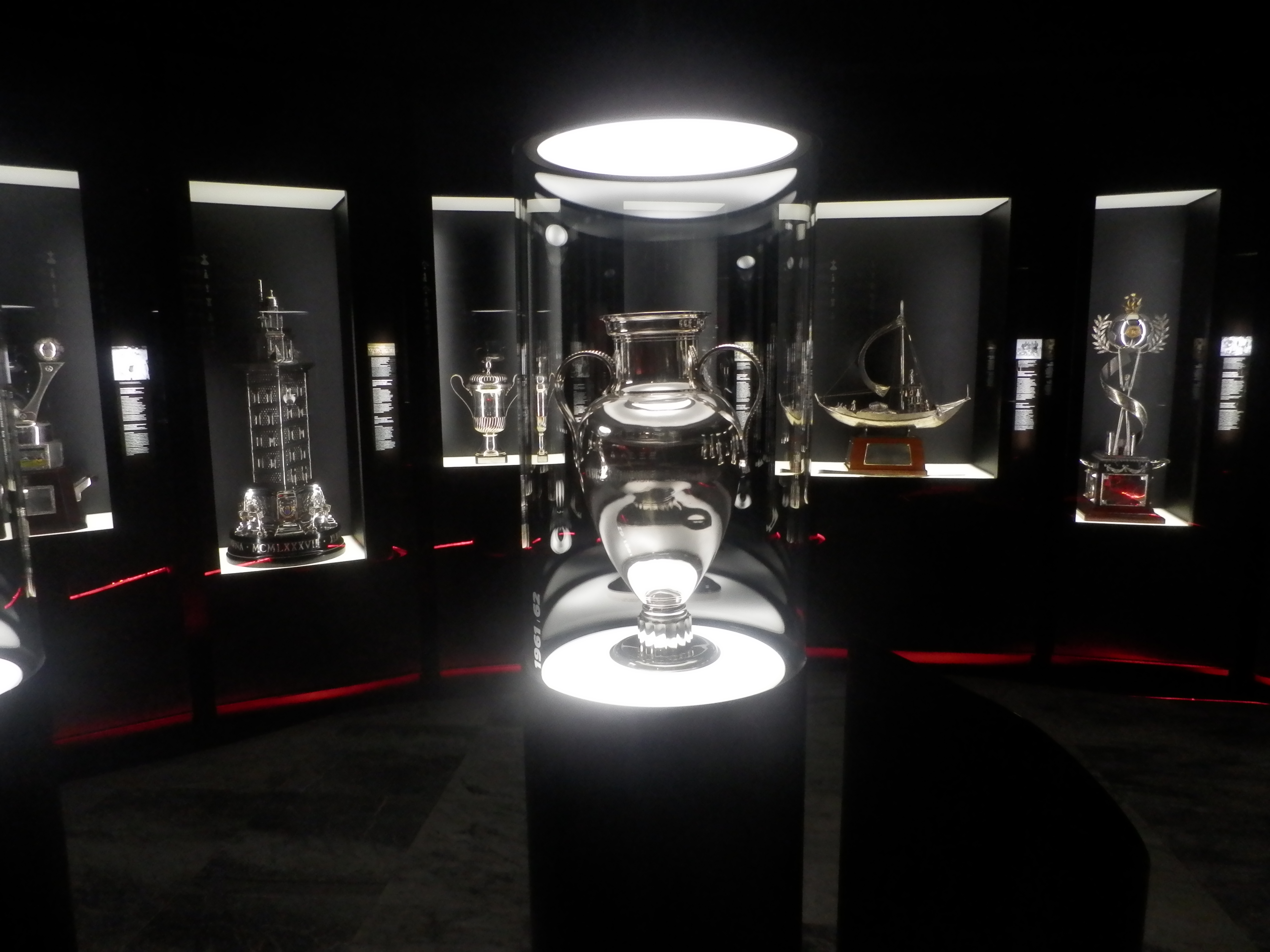
The original European Cup design, awarded to Benfica in 1962.

The original European Cup trophy was donated by L'Équipe, a French sports newspaper. This trophy was awarded permanently to Real Madrid in March 1967. At the time, they were the reigning champions, and had won six titles altogether, including the first five competitions from 1956 to 1960. Celtic therefore became the first club to win the cup in its current design in 1967.

The replacement trophy, with a somewhat different design from the original, was commissioned by UEFA from Jörg Stadelmann, a jeweller from Bern, Switzerland. At a cost of 10,000 Swiss francs, it was silver, 74 cm high, weighing 11 kg. Subsequent replacement trophies have replicated this design. The shape of the handles have earned it the nickname of "big ears" in multiple languages, including French ("la Coupe aux grandes oreilles"), Italian ("La Coppa dalle grandi orecchie"), Spanish ("La Orejona"), Russian ("Ушастый, Ushastiy"), Vietnamese ("Cúp tai voi"), Chinese ("大耳朵杯") and Arabic ("كأس ذات الأذنين"). Between 1967 and 1994, the trophy bore the title "Coupe des Clubs Champions Européens" in sentence case; AC Milan were the last team to win this type of trophy. Since then, the trophy bears the title fully in capital letters, although the size is increased in the subsequent and current trophy.

The trophy that currently is awarded is the sixth and has been in use since 2006, after Liverpool won their fifth European Cup in 2005. Since 2009, Champions League winners have not kept the real trophy, which remains in UEFA's custody at all times. A full-size replica trophy, the Champions League winners trophy, is awarded to the winning club with their name engraved on it. Winning clubs are permitted to make replicas of their own, which must be clearly marked as such and can be a maximum of eighty percent the size of the actual trophy.

=== Clubs awarded the trophy permanently ===
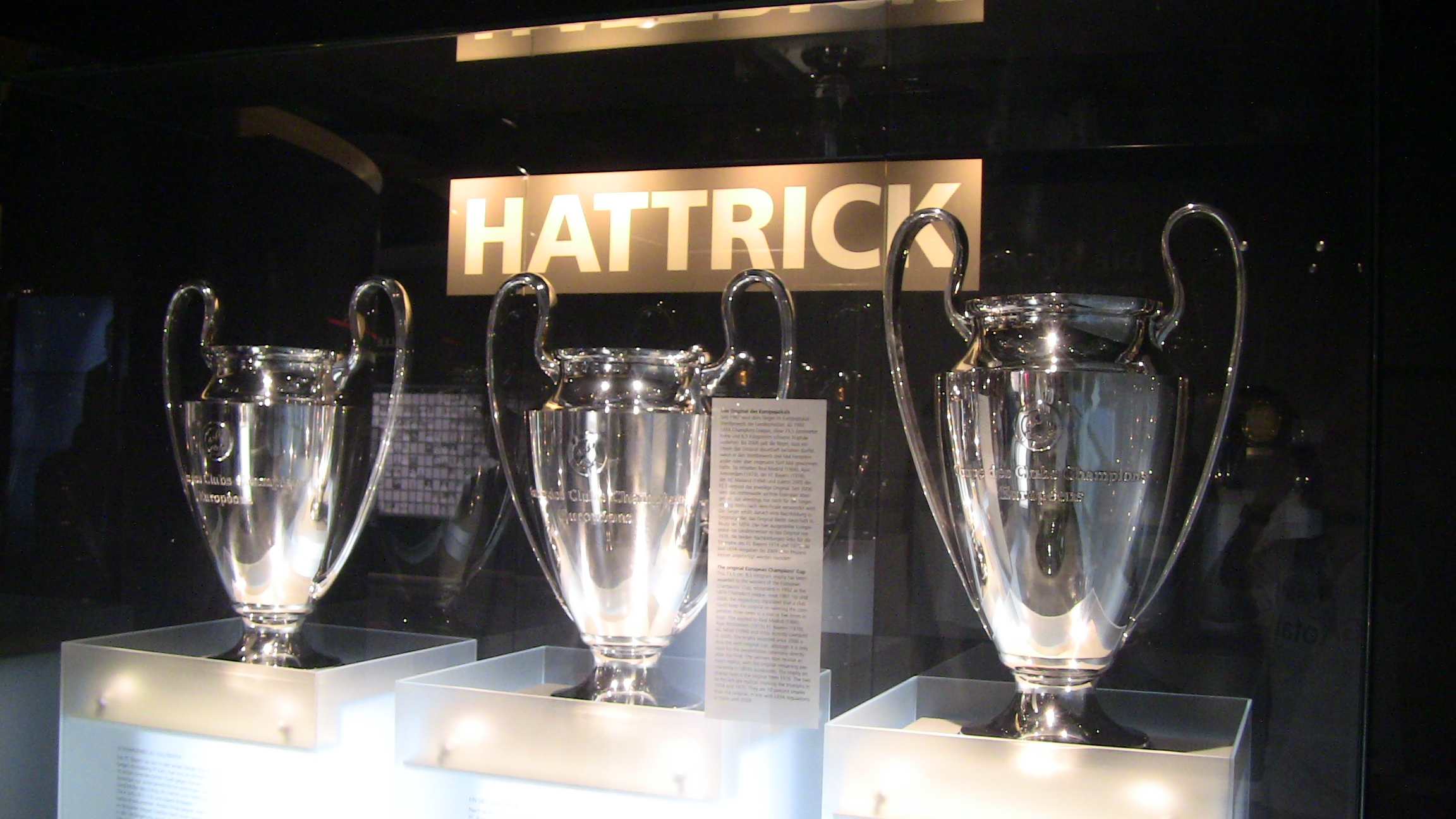
The three consecutive European Cup trophies won by Bayern Munich, 1974–76. The one on the far right is the real trophy, given to Bayern permanently in 1976. The ones on the left are slightly smaller replicas

A rule introduced before the 1968–69 season allowed a club to keep the original trophy after five wins or three consecutive wins. At that point, Real Madrid was the only club meeting either qualification, and indeed met both. Once a club had been awarded the trophy, their count would be reset to zero. Such clubs also earned the right to wear the "multiple-winner badge" (see below) that was introduced for the 2000-01 season.

Five clubs have been permanently awarded the real trophy under the old rules, from the 1968–69 to 2008–09 seasons.

- (Spain) Real Madrid, after their sixth title in 1966
- (Netherlands) Ajax, after their third consecutive title in 1973
- (Germany) Bayern Munich, after their third consecutive title in 1976
- (Italy) Milan, after their fifth title in 1994
- (England) Liverpool, after their fifth title in 2005

Prior to 2008-09, a club whose Champions League title was not a fifth overall or third consecutive win kept the real trophy for ten months after their victory and received a scaled-down replica to keep permanently. Since 2009, the real trophy remains in UEFA's custody at all times. The winning club receives a full-size replica trophy, the Champions League winners trophy, with their name engraved on it.

=== Multiple-winner badge ===
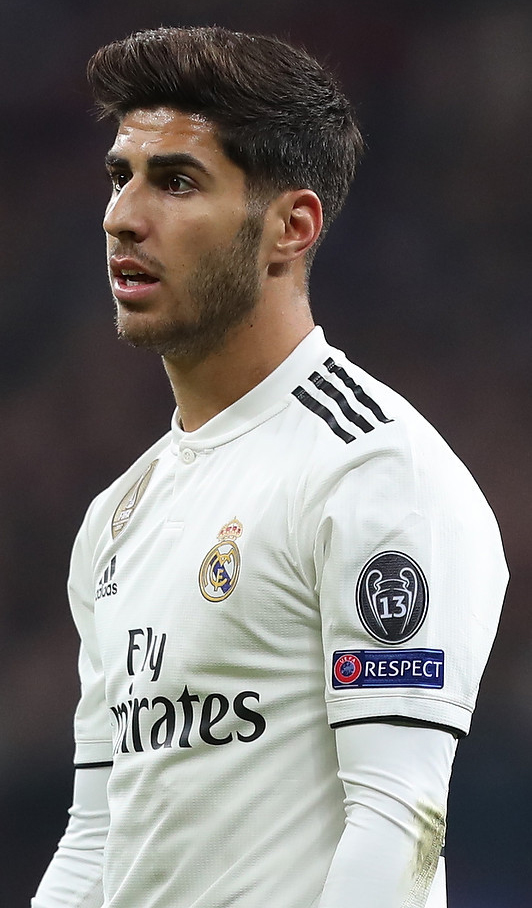
Marco Asensio in 2018. The left sleeve of his shirt prominently displays Real Madrid's multiple-winner badge (13).

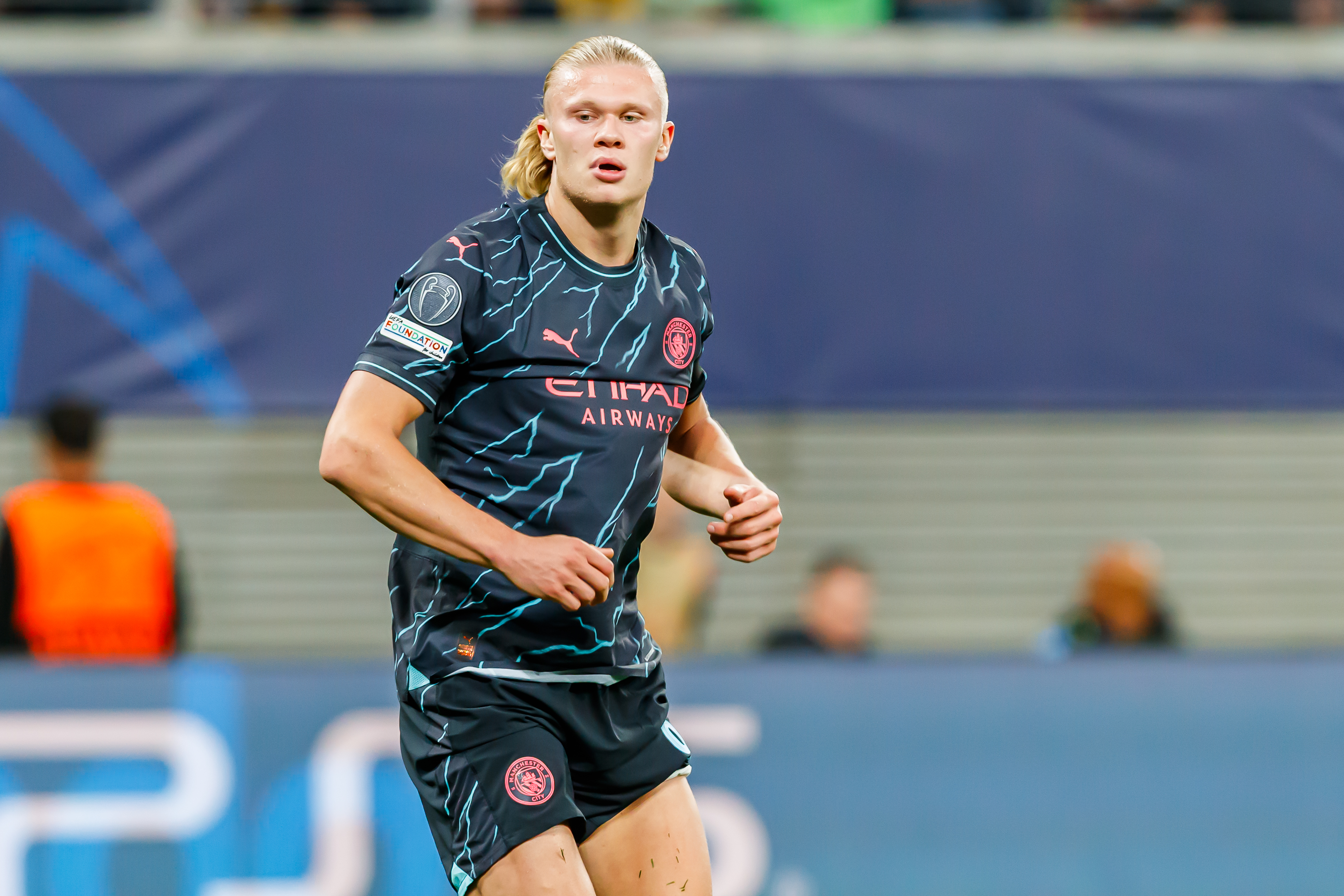
Erling Haaland in 2023. The right sleeve of his shirt displays Manchester City's title-holder badge.

The "multiple-winner badge", sometimes called "badge of honour", was introduced for the start of the 2000–01 competition for clubs that kept the trophy permanently. The badge is worn on the left sleeve of the team's shirt during Champions League matches. The original badge was a blue oval on which was an outline of the current trophy in white, overlaid with part of the Champions League starball logo. Above the trophy was the number of titles won by the club. At the start of 2012–13 competition, the badge became grey with a new design, which was used until the end of the 2020–21 season.

Starting with 2021–22, UEFA abolished the badge's use on the left sleeve, allowing for sleeve sponsors, and incorporated the badge into the regular "Starball Badge", with the number of victories placed on top of the middle star. Other teams wear the same badge but without any numbers. Additionally, title holders with three consecutive or five overall wins have their number of victories etched onto the title-holder badge, with the starball scrapped, while holders that do not have a right to wear the multiple-winner badge sport an empty grey title-holder badge.

Although the real trophy is no longer given to a team that wins a fifth overall or third consecutive title, the multiple-winner badge is still awarded to such clubs.

Six teams have won five overall or three consecutive titles, and thus can wear the multiple-winner badge:

- (Spain) Real Madrid (3 consecutive -two times-, 15 overall)
- (Italy) Milan (7 overall)
- (Germany) Bayern Munich (3 consecutive, 6 overall)
- (England) Liverpool (6 overall)
- (Spain) Barcelona (5 overall)
- (Netherlands) Ajax (3 consecutive, 4 overall)

=== Title-holder logo ===
A separate "title-holder logo" is worn by the reigning Champions League champions in the following season's competition in place of the regular patch worn by the other competing teams. The logo is predominantly dark blue and was introduced in 2004–05, with Porto as the defending champions. From 2006–07 to 2010–11, the title holders also played with the match ball used in their winning final in their home matches, but from 2011–12, the title holders use the same match ball as the 31 other teams.

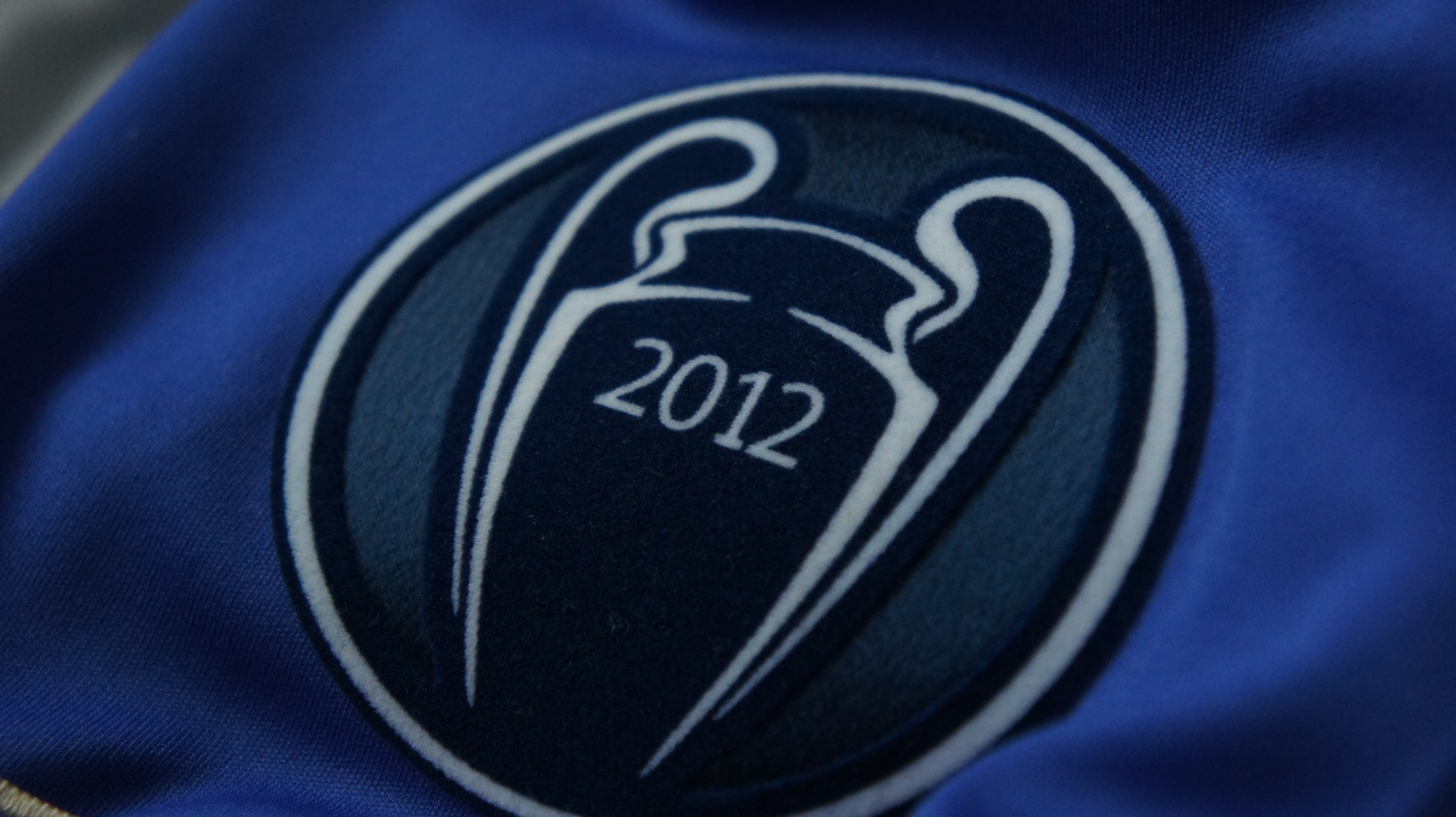
The title-holder logo worn by Chelsea in the 2012–13 season; the same design was used until 2020–21.

The original design for the title-holder badge featured two of the interconnecting stars of the competition's star ball logo at the top, with the caption "champions" and the season of triumph in the centre of the badge. It was slightly modified in 2008–09 to feature the entirety of the star ball logo, with the other stars faded out, and it was drastically changed for the 2009–10 competition. Without the star ball background, it instead featured a design of the trophy which was used for the branding of the previous season's final.

It was revamped again in 2010–11 to feature part of the star ball on show below the "champions" caption and the year of triumph. A replaced design was first worn by Chelsea in 2012–13; it featured an outline design of the trophy along with the year, the same design was kept from 2015–16 for the logo, but the material used on the logo was changed. Starting with the 2021–22 competition, reigning champions wear a new logo, which still keeps the same design, but is grey and no longer keeps the championship year in it. In case the title holder also wears a multiple-winner badge, the number of victories is incorporated in the logo which is used in place of the starball.

== Winners ==
=== Original trophy ===
- (Spain) Real Madrid (6) – 1956, 1957, 1958, 1959, 1960, 1966
- (Portugal) Benfica (2) – 1961, 1962
- (Italy) Inter Milan (2) – 1964, 1965
- (Italy) Milan (1) – 1963

=== Redesigned trophy ===
- (Spain) Real Madrid (9) – 1998, 2000, 2002, 2014, 2016, 2017, 2018, 2022, 2024
- (Italy) Milan (6) –1969, 1989, 1990, 1994, 2003, 2007
- (Germany) Bayern Munich (6) – 1974, 1975, 1976, 2001, 2013, 2020
- (England) Liverpool (6) – 1977, 1978, 1981, 1984, 2005, 2019
- (Spain) Barcelona (5) – 1992, 2006, 2009, 2011, 2015
- (Netherlands) Ajax (4) – 1971, 1972, 1973, 1995
- (England) Manchester United (3) – 1968, 1999, 2008
- (England) Nottingham Forest (2) – 1979, 1980
- (Italy) Juventus (2) – 1985, 1996
- (Portugal) Porto (2) – 1987, 2004
- (England) Chelsea (2) – 2012, 2021
- (France) Paris Saint-Germain (2) – 2025, 2026
- (Scotland) Celtic (1) – 1967
- (Netherlands) Feyenoord (1) – 1970
- (England) Aston Villa (1) – 1982
- (West Germany) Hamburger SV (1) – 1983
- (Romania) Steaua București (1) – 1986
- (Netherlands) PSV Eindhoven (1) – 1988
- (Socialist Federal Republic of Yugoslavia) Red Star Belgrade (1) – 1991
- (France) Marseille (1) – 1993
- (Germany) Borussia Dortmund (1) – 1997
- (Italy) Inter Milan (1) – 2010
- (England) Manchester City (1) – 2023
