= 2027–28 UEFA Champions League =

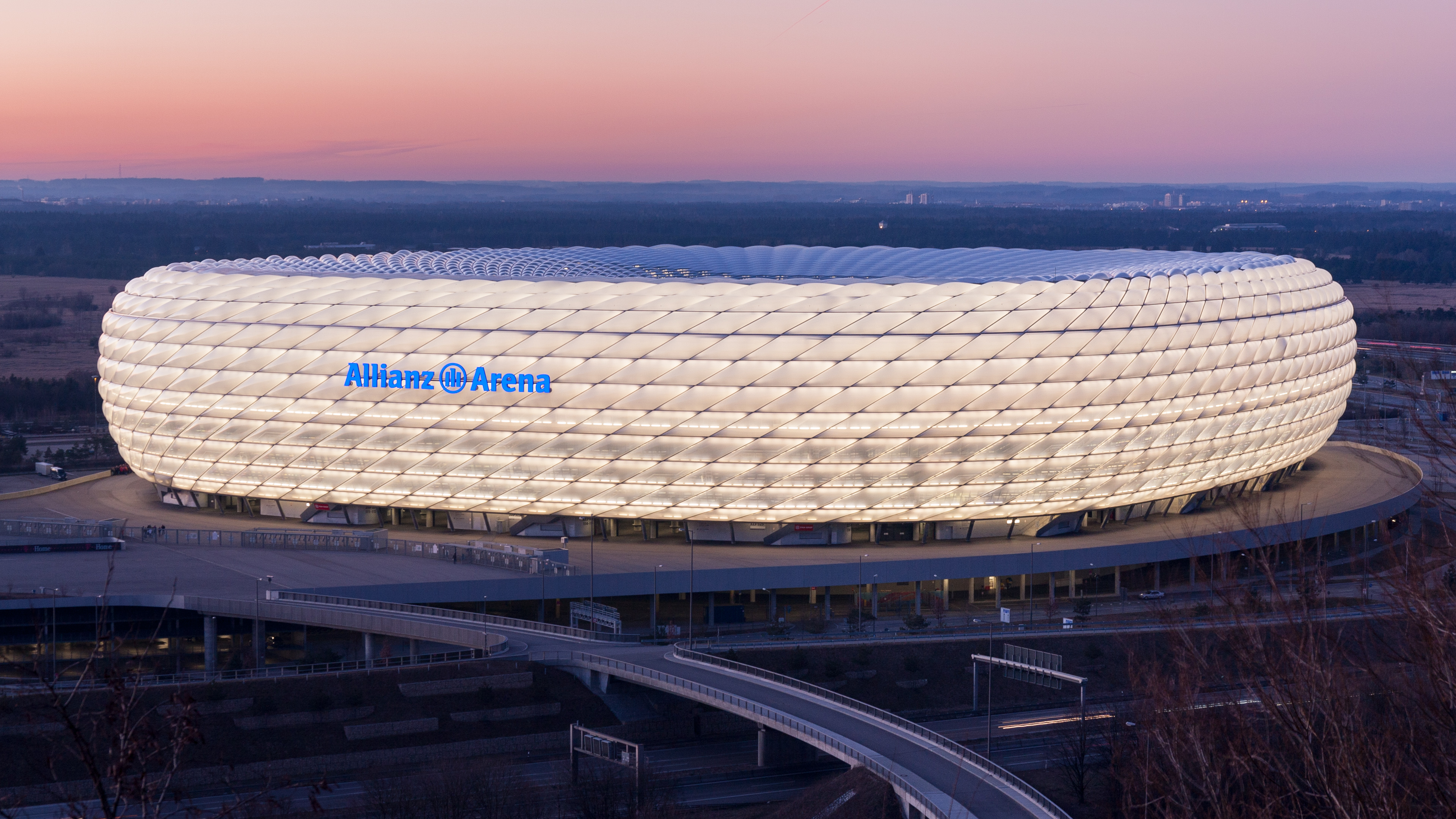
- The Allianz Arena in Munich will host the final.

Tournament details
- Dates: 6 July 2027 – 27 May 2028
- Teams: Competition proper: 36; Total: 83 (from 53 associations)

The 2027–28 UEFA Champions League will be the 73rd season of Europe's premier football tournament organised by UEFA and the 36th season since it was rebranded from the European Cup to the UEFA Champions League. The season will begin with the qualifiers in July 2027, while the league phase will start in September 2027.

The final will be held on 27 May 2028. The winners of the 2027–28 UEFA Champions League will automatically qualify for the 2028–29 UEFA Champions League league phase, the 2028 FIFA Intercontinental Cup final, the 2029 FIFA Club World Cup group stage and earn the right to play against the winners of the 2027–28 UEFA Europa League in the 2028 UEFA Super Cup. This will be the first season Nike replaces Adidas as the ball manufacturer.

== Association team allocation ==
A total of 83 teams from 53 of the 55 UEFA member associations are set to participate in the 2027–28 UEFA Champions League (the exceptions being Liechtenstein which does not organise a domestic league and Russia which is currently suspended). The association ranking based on the UEFA association coefficients is used to determine the number of participating teams for each association:

- Associations 1–5 each have four teams.
- Association 6 has three teams.
- Associations 7–15 each have two teams.
- Associations 16–55 (except Russia and Liechtenstein) each have one team.
- The winners of the 2026–27 UEFA Champions League and 2026–27 UEFA Europa League are each given an additional entry if they do not qualify for the 2027–28 UEFA Champions League through their domestic league.
- The two associations with the best coefficients in the previous season will each have one European Performance Spot into the league phase. The winners of the UEFA Champions League and Europa League cannot fill the European Performance Spots.

=== Association ranking ===
For the 2027–28 UEFA Champions League, the associations are allocated places according to their 2026 UEFA association coefficients, which takes into account their performance in European competitions from 2021–22 to 2025–26. The table reflects Russia's ongoing suspension from UEFA.

Apart from the allocation based on the association coefficients, associations may have additional teams participating in the Champions League, as noted below:

- (EPS) – European Performance Spot, the additional berths for associations who finish in the top 2 of the 2026–27 association coefficients
- (TH) – Additional berth for UEFA Champions League title holders
- (EL) – Additional berth for UEFA Europa League title holders

Association ranking for 2027–28 UEFA Champions League

Rank	Association	Coeff.	Teams	Notes
1	England	119.519	4	
2	Italy	99.946	4	
3	Spain	97.046	4	
4	Germany	92.902	4	
5	France	83.498	4	
6	Portugal	73.166	3	
7	Netherlands	67.929	2	
8	Belgium	62.250	2	
9	Turkey	51.875	2	
10	Czech Republic	48.525	2	
11	Greece	48.412	2	
12	Poland	46.750	2	
13	Denmark	42.106	2	
14	Norway	41.237	2	
15	Cyprus	35.693	2	
16	Switzerland	34.700	1	
17	Austria	33.850	1	
18	Scotland	32.050	1	
19	Sweden	29.625	1	

Rank	Association	Coeff.	Teams	Notes
20	Croatia	28.156	1	
21	Israel	27.500	1	
22	Hungary	27.187	1	
23	Ukraine	25.912	1	
24	Serbia	25.750	1	
25	Romania	25.250	1	
26	Slovenia	24.468	1	
27	Azerbaijan	22.937	1	
28	Russia	22.632	0	
29	Slovakia	22.375	1	
30	Bulgaria	21.062	1	
31	Republic of Ireland	17.343	1	
32	Iceland	16.520	1	
33	Armenia	15.062	1	
34	Moldova	14.625	1	
35	Finland	14.000	1	
36	Kosovo	13.989	1	
37	Kazakhstan	13.750	1	
38	Bosnia and Herzegovina	13.718	1	

Rank	Association	Coeff.	Teams	Notes
39	Latvia	12.875	1	
40	Faroe Islands	9.750	1	
41	Malta	9.000	1	
42	Liechtenstein	8.500	0	
43	Estonia	8.207	1	
44	Albania	8.125	1	
45	North Macedonia	7.759	1	
46	Lithuania	7.750	1	
47	Northern Ireland	7.250	1	
48	Gibraltar	7.124	1	
49	Andorra	6.832	1	
50	Belarus	6.625	1	
51	Luxembourg	6.625	1	
52	Montenegro	6.583	1	
53	Georgia	6.000	1	
54	Wales	5.624	1	
55	San Marino	2.831	1	

=== Distribution ===
		Teams entering in this round	Teams advancing from the previous round
First qualifying round (30 teams)		30 champions from associations 24–55 (except Russia and Liechtenstein)	
Second qualifying round (30 teams)	Champions Path (24 teams)	9 champions from associations 15–23	15 winners from the first qualifying round
Second qualifying round (30 teams)	League Path (6 teams)	6 runners-up from associations 10–15	
Third qualifying round (20 teams)	Champions Path (12 teams)		12 winners from the second qualifying round (Champions Path)
Third qualifying round (20 teams)	League Path (8 teams)	3 runners-up from associations 7–9; 1 third-placed team from association 6; 1 fourth-placed team from association 5	3 winners from the second qualifying round (League Path)
Play-off round (14 teams)	Champions Path (10 teams)	4 champions from associations 11–14	6 winners from the third qualifying round (Champions Path)
Play-off round (14 teams)	League Path (4 teams)		4 winners from the third qualifying round (League Path)
League phase (36 teams)		UEFA Champions League champion; UEFA Europa League champion; 2 associations with the highest coefficients from the previous season receive an extra Champions League league phase berth.; 10 champions from associations 1–10; 6 runners-up from associations 1–6; 5 third-placed teams from associations 1–5; 4 fourth-placed teams from associations 1–4	5 winners from the play-off round (Champions Path); 2 winners from the play-off round (League Path)
Knockout phase play-offs (16 teams)			16 teams ranked 9–24 from the league phase
Round of 16 (16 teams)			8 teams ranked 1–8 from the league phase; 8 winners from the knockout phase play-offs

The information here reflects the ongoing suspension of Russia in European football, and so the following changes to the default access list have been made:

- The champion of association 23 (Ukraine) will enter the second qualifying round (Champions Path) instead of the first qualifying round.

=== Teams ===
The labels in the parentheses show how each team qualified for the place of its starting round:

- TH: Champions League title holders
- EL: Europa League title holders
- 1st, 2nd, 3rd, 4th, etc.: League positions of the previous season
- EPS: European Performance Spots – the additional berths given to clubs from the two associations with the highest coefficient points in 2026–27

The label of European Performance Spots and title holders already qualified via league position are superscripted.

The second qualifying round, third qualifying round and play-off round are divided into Champions Path (CH) and League Path (LP).

Qualified teams for 2027–28 UEFA Champions League
Entry round		Teams			
League phase		^{TH}	^{EL}	^{EPS}	^{EPS}
League phase		(England) (1st)	(England) (2nd)	(England) (3rd)	(England) (4th)
League phase		(Italy) (1st)	(Italy) (2nd)	(Italy) (3rd)	(Italy) (4th)
League phase		(Spain) (1st)	(Spain) (2nd)	(Spain) (3rd)	(Spain) (4th)
League phase		(Germany) (1st)	(Germany) (2nd)	(Germany) (3rd)	(Germany) (4th)
League phase		(France) (1st)	(France) (2nd)	(France) (3rd)	(Portugal) (1st)
League phase		(Portugal) (2nd)	(Netherlands) (1st)	(Belgium) (1st)	(Turkey) (1st)
League phase		(Czech Republic) (1st)			
Play-off round	CH	(Greece) (1st)	(Poland) (1st)	(Denmark) (1st)	(Norway) (1st)
Third qualifying round	LP	(France) (4th)	(Portugal) (3rd)	(Netherlands) (2nd)	(Belgium) (2nd)
Third qualifying round	LP	(Turkey) (2nd)			
Second qualifying round	CH	(Cyprus) (1st)	(Switzerland) (1st)	(Austria) (1st)	(Scotland) (1st)
Second qualifying round	CH	(Sweden) (1st)	(Croatia) (1st)	(Israel) (1st)	(Hungary) (1st)
Second qualifying round	CH	(Ukraine) (1st)			
Second qualifying round	LP	(Czech Republic) (2nd)	(Greece) (2nd)	(Poland) (2nd)	(Denmark) (2nd)
Second qualifying round	LP	(Norway) (2nd)	(Cyprus) (2nd)		
First qualifying round	CH	(Serbia) (1st)	(Romania) (1st)	(Slovenia) (1st)	(Azerbaijan) (1st)
First qualifying round	CH	(Slovakia) (1st)	(Bulgaria) (1st)	(Republic of Ireland) Shamrock Rovers (1st)	(Iceland) Víkingur Reykjavík (1st)
First qualifying round	CH	(Armenia) (1st)	(Moldova) (1st)	(Finland) Inter Turku (1st)	(Kosovo) (1st)
First qualifying round	CH	(Kazakhstan) Ordabasy (1st)	(Bosnia and Herzegovina) (1st)	(Latvia) RFS (1st)	(Faroe Islands) NSÍ Runavík (1st)
First qualifying round	CH	(Malta) (1st)	(Estonia) FCI Levadia (1st)	(Albania) (1st)	(North Macedonia) (1st)
First qualifying round	CH	(Lithuania) Kauno Žalgiris (1st)	(Northern Ireland) (1st)	(Gibraltar) (1st)	(Andorra) (1st)
First qualifying round	CH	(Belarus) (1st)	(Luxembourg) (1st)	(Montenegro) (1st)	(Georgia (country)) (1st)
First qualifying round	CH	(Wales) (1st)	(San Marino) (1st)		

1. Liechtenstein (LIE): The seven teams affiliated with the Liechtenstein Football Association (LFV) all play in the Swiss football league system. The only competition organised by the LFV is the Liechtenstein Football Cup – the winners of which qualify for the UEFA Conference League for the 2027–28 season.
2. Norway (NOR): Viking and Bodø/Glimt have qualified as they will finish in the top two of the 2026 Eliteserien.
3. Russia (RUS): On 28 February 2022, Russian football clubs and national teams were suspended from FIFA and UEFA competitions due to the Russian invasion of Ukraine. The tables reflect Russia's ongoing suspension from UEFA competitions.

== Schedule ==
The schedule of the competition is as follows.

Schedule for 2027–28 UEFA Champions League
Phase	Round	Draw date	First leg	Second leg
Qualifying	First qualifying round	15 June 2027	6–7 July 2027	13–14 July 2027
Qualifying	Second qualifying round	16 June 2027	20–21 July 2027	27–28 July 2027
Qualifying	Third qualifying round	19 July 2027	3–4 August 2027	10–11 August 2027
Play-offs	Play-off round	2 August 2027	17–18 August 2027	24–25 August 2027
League phase	Matchday 1	26 August 2027	7–9 September 2027	
League phase	Matchday 2	26 August 2027	12–14 October 2027	
League phase	Matchday 3	26 August 2027	19–21 October 2027	
League phase	Matchday 4	26 August 2027	2–4 November 2027	
League phase	Matchday 5	26 August 2027	23–25 November 2027	
League phase	Matchday 6	26 August 2027	7–9 December 2027	
League phase	Matchday 7	26 August 2027	18–20 January 2028	
League phase	Matchday 8	26 August 2027	26 January 2028	
Knockout phase	Knockout phase play-offs	28 January 2028	15–16 February 2028	22–23 February 2028
Knockout phase	Round of 16	25 February 2028	7–8 March 2028	14–15 March 2028
Knockout phase	Quarter-finals	—N/a	4–5 April 2028	11–12 April 2028
Knockout phase	Semi-finals	—N/a	25–26 April 2028	2–3 May 2028
Knockout phase	Final	—N/a	27 May 2028	
