= Football in Portugal =

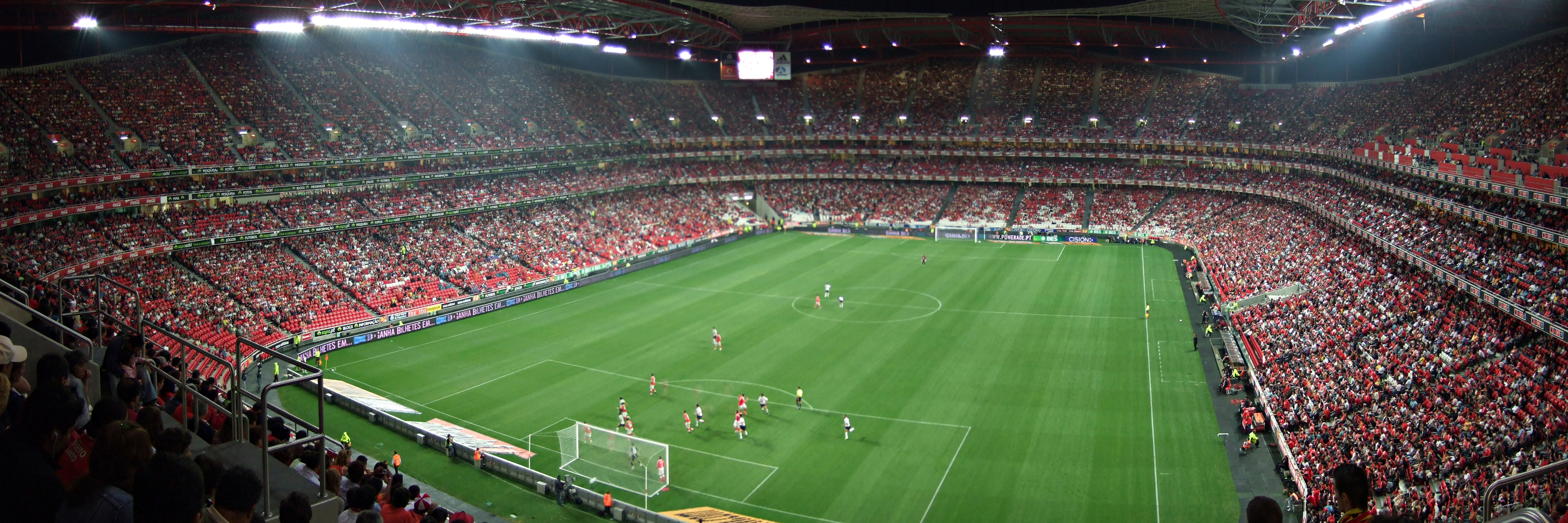
- Football fans at the Estádio da Luz
- Country: Portugal
- Governing body: FPF
- National team: Men's • women's
- First played: 1875; 151 years ago

Club competitions
- List: League: Primeira Liga Campeonato Nacional Feminino Liga Portugal 2 Terceira Liga Campeonato de Portugal; Cups: Taça de Portugal Taça de Portugal Feminina Taça da Liga Taça da Liga Feminina Supertaça Cândido de Oliveira Supertaça de Portugal Feminina

International competitions
- FIFA World Cup; FIFA Women's World Cup; UEFA European Championship; UEFA Women's Championship; UEFA Nations League; UEFA Women's Nations League; FIFA Club World Cup; FIFA Intercontinental Cup; UEFA Champions League; UEFA Women's Champions League; UEFA Europa League; UEFA Women's Europa Cup; UEFA Conference League; UEFA Super Cup

Association football (Portuguese: futebol, European Portuguese pronunciation: [fu.tɨˈbɔl]) is the most popular sport in Portugal. Approximately 75% of the people in Portugal are interested in football. It has a long and storied history in the country, following its introduction in 1875 in cities such as Funchal, Lisbon, Porto and Coimbra by English merchants and Portuguese students arriving back home from studying in England. This led to the establishment of local clubs dedicated to the practice of the sport.

Initially, football was played between neighbour clubs, but soon enough citywide and regional tournaments started to take place around the nation. Soon after the start of the 20th century, the need to establish which club was the best in Portugal culminated with the organizing of the "Campeonato de Portugal" (now known as "Taça de Portugal"), with subsequent bragging rights going mostly to clubs from Lisbon and Porto.

Portugal's top domestic league, the Primeira Liga, was founded in 1934 and is home to internationally successful clubs such as S.L. Benfica, FC Porto and Sporting CP – the "Big Three", who usually dominate the league. With a combined eleven trophies won to date, the measure of success by Portuguese clubs in international competition is as follows: four European Cup/UEFA Champions League, two UEFA Cup/UEFA Europa League, one European Cup Winners' Cup, one UEFA Intertoto Cup, one UEFA Super Cup and two Intercontinental Cup/Toyota Cup.

Despite the production of footballers such as Eusébio, Luís Figo and Cristiano Ronaldo (Ballon d'Or winners), the Portugal national team have been, for the most part, underachievers at international level when compared to their youth squads, who have won just about every European and world title available. In FIFA World Cup, Portugal's best finishes were third in 1966 and fourth in 2006. More recently, Portugal won their first major title, the UEFA Euro 2016, over hosts France. Until then, Portugal had been runners-up to Greece as hosts in 2004, and semifinalists in 1984, 2000 and 2012. In 2019, Portugal won the first edition of the UEFA Nations League, beating the Netherlands.

== History ==
=== Early history ===
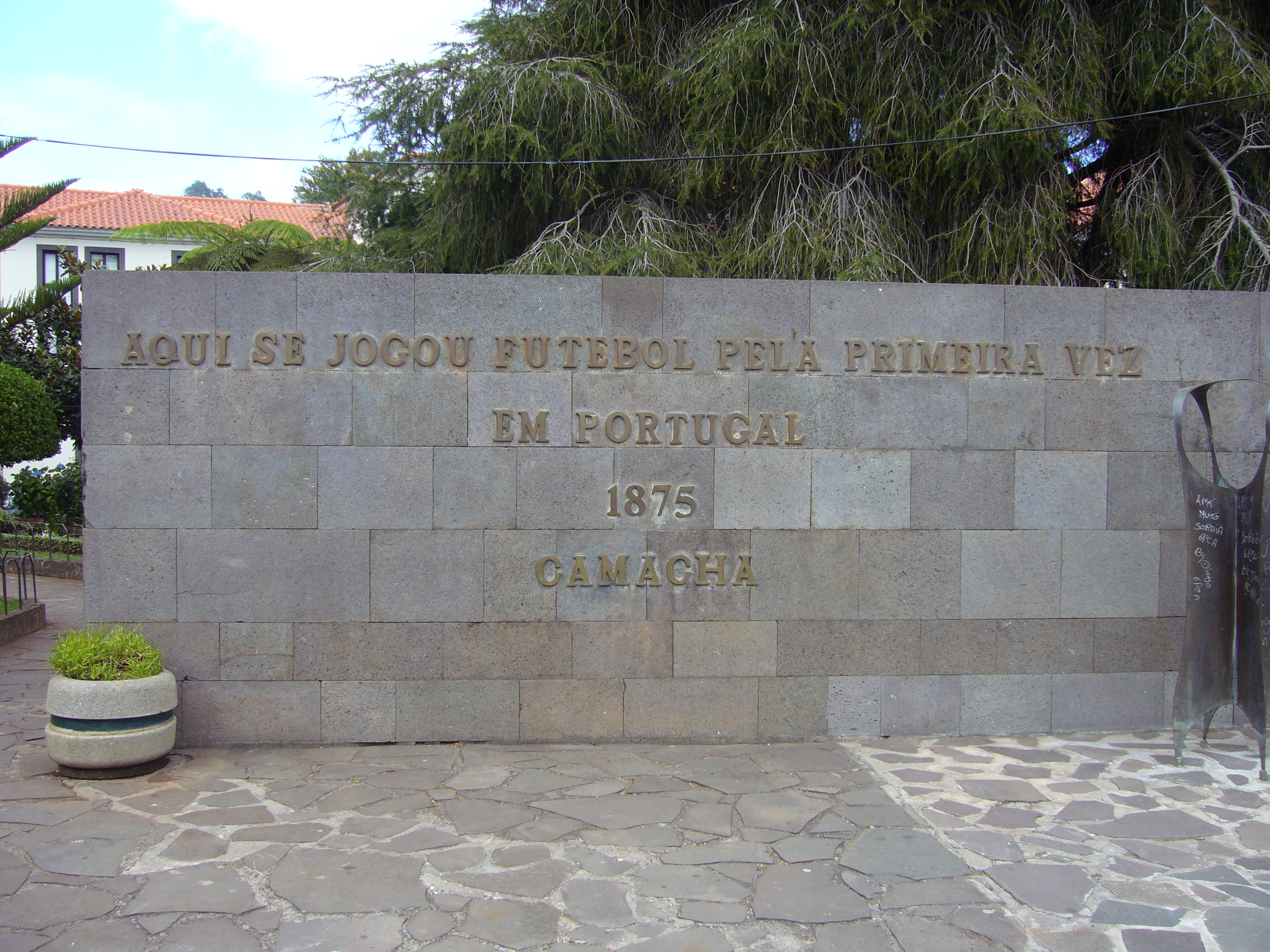
Monument in Camacha, celebrating the first ever organised football game in Portugal

Football started to gain popularity in Portugal in the late 19th century, brought by Portuguese students who returned from England.

The first organized game in the country took place in 1875 in Camacha, Madeira, organized by Madeira-born Harry Hinton, who brought a football from England where he was studying. Popularity quickly spread across the island. Harry would go on to become honorary president of C.S. Marítimo.

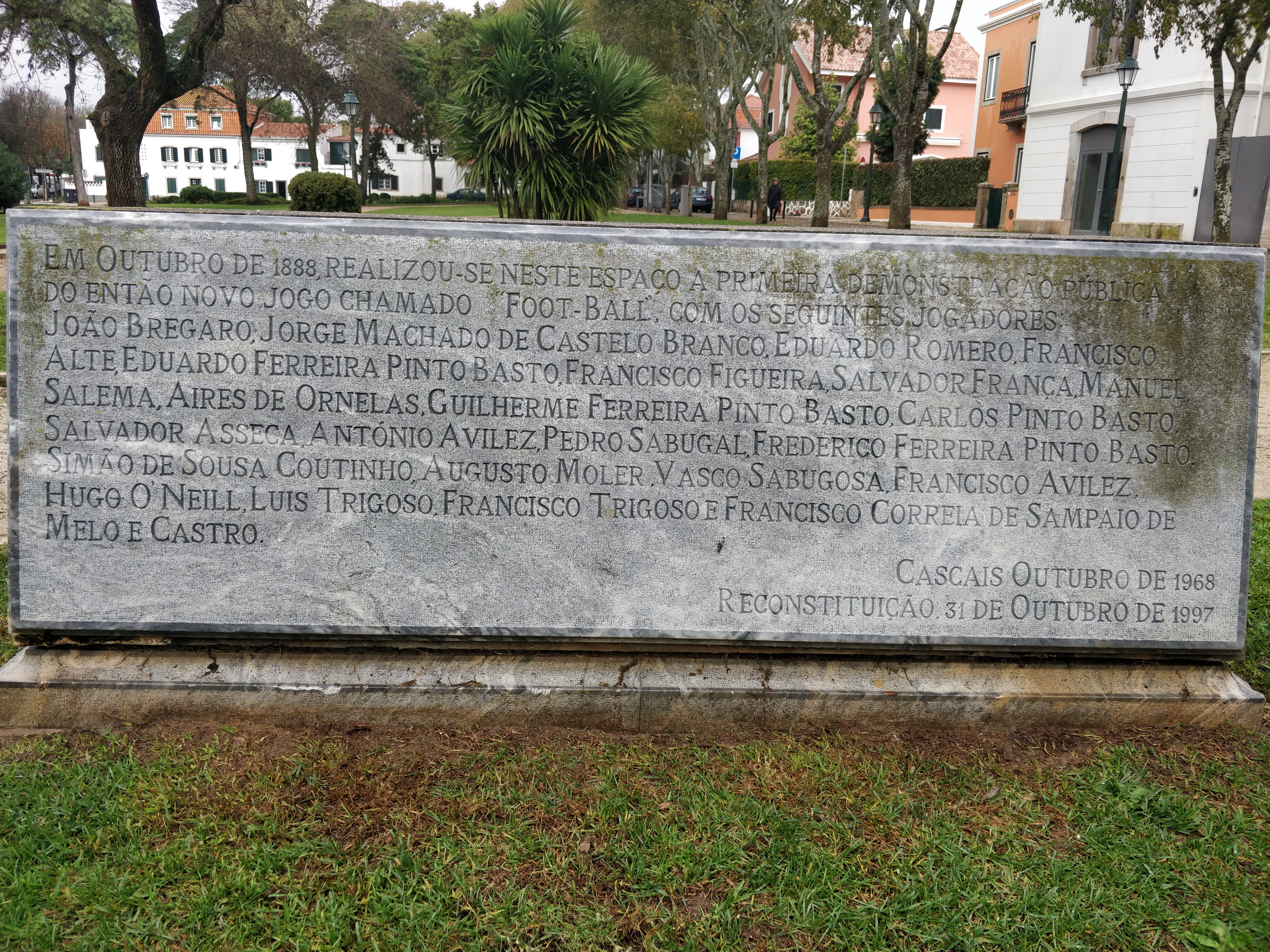
A memorial to the first football match played on mainland Portugal in Cascais in October 1888

The Pinto Basto brothers, Guilherme, Eduardo and Frederico, were the fundamental heads behind its spread in mainland Portugal. They had been introduced to football while studying in England at St George's College and Eduardo played a decisive role in the development of football in Portugal and particularly in Lisbon when he ordered a series of footballs from England, which he distributed to various military units, thus giving a huge boost to the practice of this sport. On the other hand, Guilherme organized an exhibition in Cascais in October 1888, the first known football match in mainland Portugal, which was a rehearsal for a more serious and competitive match organized three months later, on 22 January 1889, held in Lisbon where today's Campo Pequeno bullring is located. It was contested between the Portuguese noblemen, who were made up of the best players from the 1888 game, and a group of English workers living in Lisboa, who were made up of employees of Cabo Submarino, Casa Graham and other English houses installed in Lisbon. Consequently, football started attracting the attention of high society, distinguished by the Luso-British rivalry.

The first football club to have been founded in Portugal was Club Lisbonense in 1892, which was founded by the Pinto Basto brothers together with other football pioneers in the city such as the Vilar brothers (Carlos and Afonso) and Paiva Raposo. Club Lisbonense played its first games against the English from Carcavelos, who would eventually organize themselves into a Club, the Carcavelos Club. These two groups were the first promoters of football in Lisbon, and football began taking root in the city, especially among the youth, thus the game soon reached colleges and so, Lisbonense and Carcavelos are joined by a team made up of students from Colégio Villar. The three groups began to play several matches against each other and were eventually joined by a team of Braço de Prata, which included several Englishmen and build-up an Invictus status. However, a certain Clube de Lisboa committed the feat of beating the "invincible" team of Braço de Prata by 2–0 in 1903. In April 1893, the Estrela Foot-Ball Club appears, captained by Commander Joaquim Costa.

Then came the presentation of a football team from the Club Tauromático Group, which again included the three brothers Pinto Basto (Guilherme, Eduardo, and Frederico), among others, such as Hugo O'Neil, who had played in the 1888 game. At the end of January 1893, however, the Group of Club Tauromático becomes the Grupo dos Irmãos Pinto Basto (English: Pinto Basto Brothers Group). Moreover, the Pinto Basto brothers, in addition to being part of and playing for several clubs already, had their own group, the "Foot-Ball Club Swifts", where Guilherme was the captain and his brother Eduardo was the sub-captain.

On 28 September 1893, Foot-Ball Club do Porto was reportedly organized in Porto, which was the first football club to be established in the North of the country (according to some sources, it is the club currently known as FC Porto, including the club itself since 1982, while other sources claim it to be two separate entities. According to the club's history book prior to 1982, FC Porto was founded on 2 August 1906). In February 1894, the students of Casa Pia in Lisbon organize their football group. Other clubs who emerged around this time were Foot-Ball Académico, in 1895, and Clube de Campo de Ourique, in 1896. This was followed by a period of some lack of interest in football (1896–99), due to the lack of fields, goals, equipment, and the rudeness of its practice, with the local press even starting to call it the "kickback" game. During this period it was Casa Pia, which emerged in 1892, who came to play the most important role in the expansion and progress of football.

The first cup match in the country was held in Porto on 2 March 1894, and it was attended by King Carlos and Queen Amelia. This is possibly the first match in which extra time was played as the royal couple arrived too late to see the first half and the Queen demanded that the game continue after the end, because she was enjoying it so much.

By century's end, associations such as Clube Lisbonense, Carcavelos Sport Club, Braço de Prata, Real Ginásio Clube Português, Estrela Futebol Clube, Futebol Académico, Campo de Ourique, Foot-Ball Club do Porto, and Sport Clube Vianense had been founded.

The failed attempts to reorganize Club Lisbonense (1892) and Grupo Estrela (1893) paved the way for the appearance of the Club Internacional de Foot-Ball (CIF) on 8 December 1902, which was the natural extension of the Grupo dos Irmãos Pinto Basto and the Foot-Ball Club Swits. CIF was the first Portuguese club to play abroad, defeating Madrid Fútbol Clube in 1907 in Madrid.

On 31 March 1914, the three regional associations that existed in Portugal (Lisbon, Portalegre, and Porto) merged to create a national association called a União Portuguesa de Futebol, the predecessor of the current national association, the Portuguese Football Federation, which was formed on 28 May 1926.

=== Golden age ===
The Portuguese were one of the first Europeans to explore Africa. They have influenced a lot of their former colonies, notably in the realm of football. This was mostly due to the concept of Lusotropicalism, which became popularized during the tenure of António Salazar. The Portuguese enthusiasm for football led to the spread of the sport into its former overseas colonies of Angola, Mozambique, Guinea, Cape Verde, S. Tomé and Principe, Portuguese India, Macau, and Timor. Eventually, Portugal would attempt to integrate their colonies, which would lead to them having many African players in the teams on the mainland. Introduced in the colonies as early as the 19th century, football became increasingly popular. By the 1950s many Africans would support football teams on the mainland. The popularity of the game in the colonies also meant that there were many people who wanted to play it professionally. Many top players from the former colonies have represented Portugal at the international level, as well as playing for many clubs in the various tiers of the national and international leagues, most notably in the past the likes of Fernando Peyroteo, Matateu, Hilário, Costa Pereira, Coluna, José Águas, Eusébio, Jordão, Shéu and Abel Xavier. But Eusébio's impact in Portuguese football stood out among them all to such an extent that when Eusébio arrived in Lisbon in December 1960 still as a player of Sporting Lourenço Marques, Sporting CP had won ten league titles, which was as many as Benfica's, and when, 15 years later, Eusébio, recognised as Benfica's best player of all time, left Benfica, Benfica had won 21 championships to just 14 for Sporting CP. Eusébio is considered one of the greatest Portuguese football players ever and his role in the 1966 FIFA World Cup is still remembered today as a significant milestone in Portugal’s football history.

== Club football ==
The main domestic football competition is the Primeira Liga, and the dominant Portuguese teams are S.L. Benfica, FC Porto and Sporting CP, which form the "Big Three" clubs in Portugal. Other clubs, such as C.F. Os Belenenses, Boavista FC, Vitória S.C., and S.C. Braga, have been contenders for the coveted place of fourth biggest club. The reality is that the distance separating these emblems from the Big Three remains abysmal in several aspects, making it difficult to reach a consensus on this nomination. Since the status of 'big' is somewhat interpretive, the choice depends on the perspective adopted: those who value mystique and popular support point to Vitória SC; those who focus on results and current competitiveness choose SC Braga; and those who look at historical achievements highlight Boavista or Belenenses.

One of the oldest clubs still in existence is Académica de Coimbra, founded in 1887. Other historical club is Boavista F.C., founded in 1903. S.L. Benfica was founded in 1904 as Sport Lisboa, who merged with Grupo Sport Benfica in 1908. Sporting CP was founded in 1906. F.C. Porto was founded in 1906 and changed its foundation year to 1893 in the 1980s. Leixões S.C. was founded in 1907; Vitória F.C., C.S. Marítimo, C.D. Nacional in 1910; S.C. Olhanense in 1912; S.C. Espinho, Portimonense S.C. and Académico de Viseu F.C. in 1914; C.F. Os Belenenses in 1919. The success of these earlier clubs inspired the rapid spread of football to all corners of Portugal.

After the end of World War I, the sprouting of football clubs all over the country gained momentum and, in the 1920s, S.C. Braga, Vitória S.C., Gil Vicente F.C. and S.C. Beira Mar among many others, were founded, further asserting the popularity of the sport wherever it was played, with stadiums filled to maximum capacity. By then, the local talent always wanting to better the opposition further improved the quality of the players' training and tactical strategy awareness by investing and importing top foreign coaching and managerial staff from abroad, resulting in the refinement and improvement of the local game quality being able to stand up to top international levels. Some early clubs from the late 1800s and early 1900s, like Carcavelinhos, for example, did not survive and either merged with other clubs or became extinct altogether.

At European level, before the advent of UEFA-sanctioned competitions, such as the European Cup, the European Cup Winners' Cup and the UEFA Cup, which became regularly scheduled competitions, Benfica won the now defunct Latin Cup, a competition organized annually by the football associations of France, Italy, Portugal, and Spain, from the late 1940s to the mid-1950s, involving those nations' top teams.

=== List of teams (2022–23 season) ===
Conventional name	UEFA short name	Official name	Location
Arouca	F.C. Arouca	Futebol Clube de Arouca	Arouca
Benfica	S.L. Benfica	Sport Lisboa e Benfica	Lisbon
Boavista	Boavista F.C.	Boavista Futebol Clube	Porto
Braga	S.C. Braga	Sporting Clube de Braga	Braga
Casa Pia	Casa Pia A.C.	Casa Pia Atlético Clube	Lisbon
Chaves	G.D. Chaves	Grupo Desportivo Chaves	Chaves
Estoril	G.D. Estoril Praia	Grupo Desportivo Estoril Praia	Estoril
Famalicão	F.C. Famalicão	Futebol Clube de Famalicão	Vila Nova de Famalicão
Gil Vicente	Gil Vicente F.C.	Gil Vicente Futebol Clube	Barcelos
Marítimo	C.S. Marítimo	Club Sport Marítimo	Funchal, Madeira
Paços de Ferreira	F.C. Paços de Ferreira	Futebol Clube Paços de Ferreira	Paços de Ferreira
Portimonense	Portimonense S.C.	Portimonense Sporting Clube	Portimão
Porto	FC Porto	Futebol Clube do Porto	Porto
Rio Ave	Rio Ave F.C.	Rio Ave Futebol Clube	Vila do Conde
Santa Clara	C.D. Santa Clara	Clube Desportivo Santa Clara	Ponta Delgada
Sporting	Sporting CP	Sporting Clube de Portugal	Lisbon
Vitória de Guimarães	Vitória S.C.	Vitória Sport Clube	Guimarães
Vizela	F.C. Vizela	Futebol Clube de Vizela	Vizela

=== List of teams by major honours ===
Below is listed every team to have won any of the major domestic competitions (organized by LPFP and FPF) and international trophies organized by UEFA and FIFA.

Domestic competitions
PL	Primeira Liga
TdP	Taça de Portugal
TdL	Taça da Liga
SC	Supertaça Cândido de Oliveira
CdP	Campeonato de Portugal (1922–1938) (Defunct)
TRR	Taça Ribeiro dos Reis (1961–1971) (Defunct)
TI	Taça do Império (1944) (Defunct)
FC	Taça Federação Portuguesa de Futebol (1977) (Defunct)
European Continental competitions
UCL	UEFA Champions League, former European Champion Clubs' Cup
UCWC	UEFA Cup Winners' Cup (1960–1999) (Defunct)
UEL	UEFA Europa League, former UEFA Cup
UECL	UEFA Conference League,
USC	UEFA Super Cup
UIC	UEFA Intertoto Cup (1995–2008) (Defunct)
LC	Latin Cup (1949–1957) (Defunct)
Worldwide competitions
FCWC	FIFA Club World Cup
IC	Intercontinental Cup (1960–2004) (Defunct)

Bold denotes club with the most number of trophies in specified category.

#	Club	Domestic trophies									Continental trophies							Worldwide trophies	Honours	Most recent trophy
#	Club	PL	TdP	TdL	SC	CdP	TRR	TI	FC	Total	UCL	UEL	USC	UCWC	UIC	LC	Total	IC	Total	Most recent trophy
1	Benfica	**38**	**26**	**8**	10	3	**3**			88	**2**					**1**	**3**		91	2025 Supertaça Cândido de Oliveira
2	Porto	31	20	1	**25**	**4**				81	**2**	**2**	**1**				**5**	**2**	88	2026 Supertaça Cândido de Oliveira
3	Sporting CP	21	18	4	9	**4**		**1**		57				**1**			**1**		58	2024–25 Taça de Portugal
4	Boavista	1	5		3					9									9	2000–01 Primeira Liga
5	Braga		3	3					**1**	7					**1**		**1**		8	2023–24 Taça da Liga
6	Belenenses	1	3			3				7									7	1988–89 Taça de Portugal
6	Vitória de Setúbal		3	1			**3**			7									7	2007–08 Taça da Liga
8	Vitória de Guimarães		1	1	1					3									3	2025–26 Taça da Liga
9	Académica		2							2									2	2011–12 Taça de Portugal
9	Beira-Mar		1				1			2									2	1998–99 Taça de Portugal
11	Leixões		1							1									1	1960–61 Taça de Portugal
11	Estrela da Amadora		1							1									1	1989–90 Taça de Portugal
11	Aves		1							1									1	2017–18 Taça de Portugal
11	Torreense		1							1									1	2025–26 Taça de Portugal
11	Moreirense			1						1									1	2016–17 Taça da Liga
11	Olhanense					1				1									1	1923–24 Campeonato de Portugal
11	Marítimo					1				1									1	1925–26 Campeonato de Portugal
11	Carcavelinhos (Note: Carcavelinhos is an extinct club. It merged with União de Lisboa in 1942, resulting in Atlético de Portugal.)					1				1									1	1927–28 Campeonato de Portugal
11	Seixal						1			1									1	1961–62 T. Ribeiro Reis
11	SC Espinho						1			1									1	1966–67 T. Ribeiro Reis
11	Barreirense						1			1									1	1967–68 T. Ribeiro Reis

== National team ==
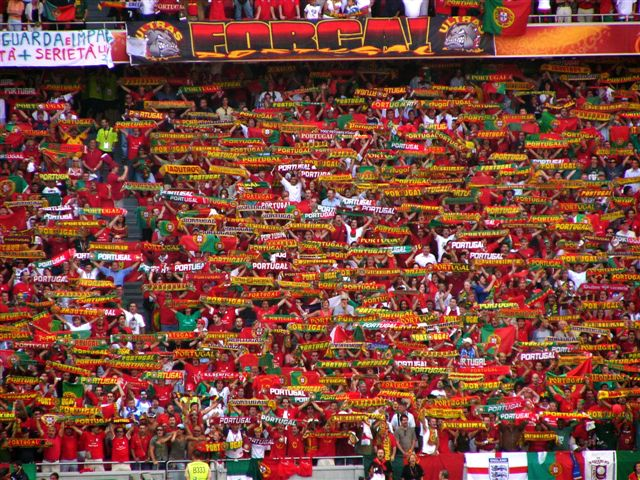
Portuguese football fans supporting the Portugal national team

Top-ranked football stadiums in Portugal

On 26 May 2010, Portugal attained the third place in the FIFA World Ranking, their highest ever. They repeated this feat in 2012, 2014, 2017 and 2018. Their lowest rank was 43rd overall in 1998. In recent years, Portugal has consistently maintained a top 10 and, sometimes, a top 5 FIFA world rank position.

In 2004 Portugal hosted UEFA Euro and reached its final but were beaten by Greece 1–0. In worldwide terms, Portugal have reached the semi-finals of the FIFA World Cup twice: in the 1966 edition, where Eusébio was the top scorer with nine goals, and in the 2006 edition, where the team led by captain Luís Figo marked the World Cup debut of Cristiano Ronaldo.

Portugal also participates to the Lusofonia Games and takes part in its football tournaments. In 2014, Portugal was one of the eight nations to take part in the first Unity World Cup.

Following the retirement of all players from its "golden generation", Portugal, led by manager Fernando Santos, won Euro 2016, defeating hosts France 1–0 in the final. In 2019, Portugal won the inaugural UEFA Nations League by defeating Netherlands 1–0 in the final. They won a second Nations League title in 2025, after a final victory against Spain.

=== See also ===
This is a list of football stadiums in Portugal where the national team plays most of its games.

Stadiums in Portugal
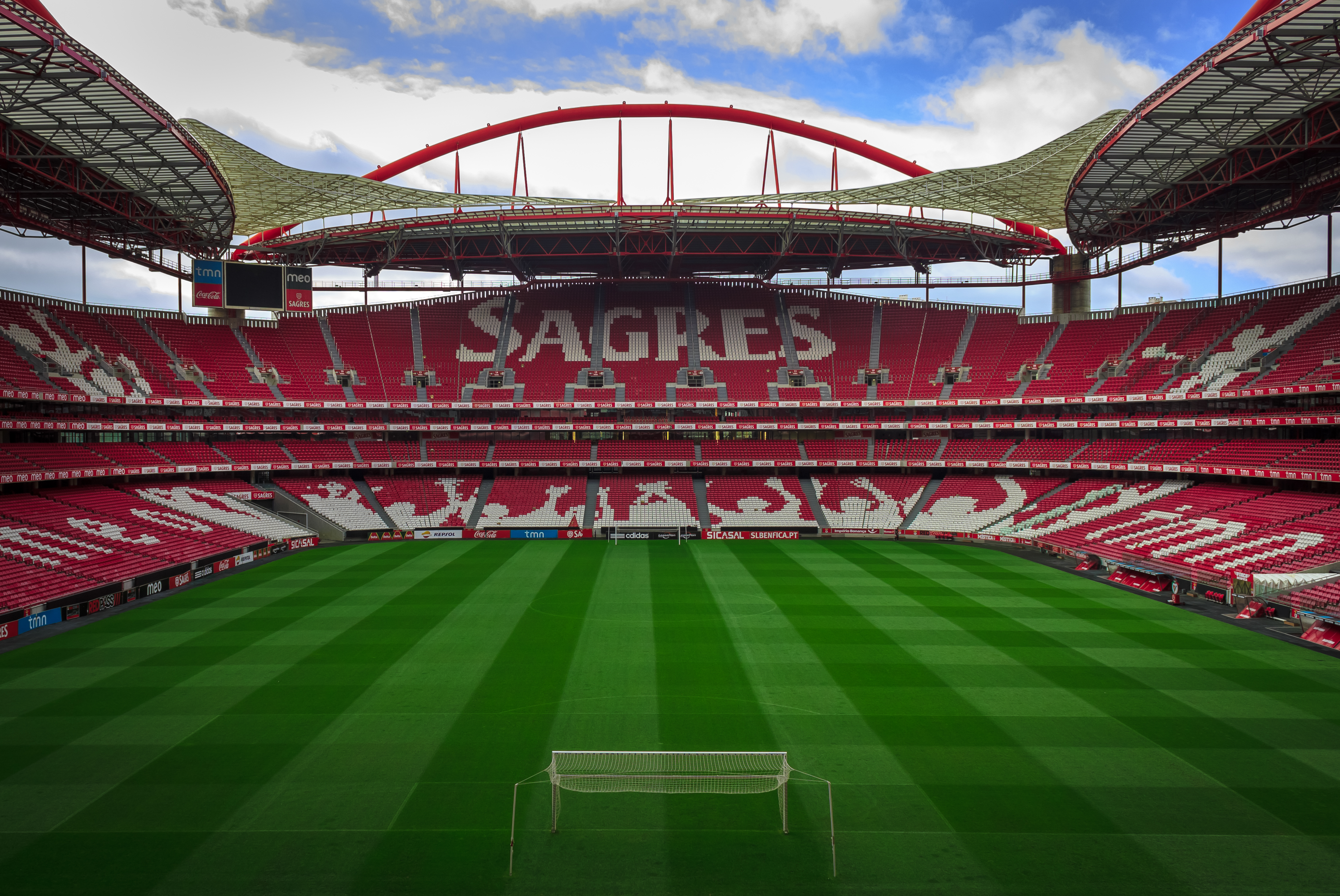
Estádio da Luz
Capacity: 68,100

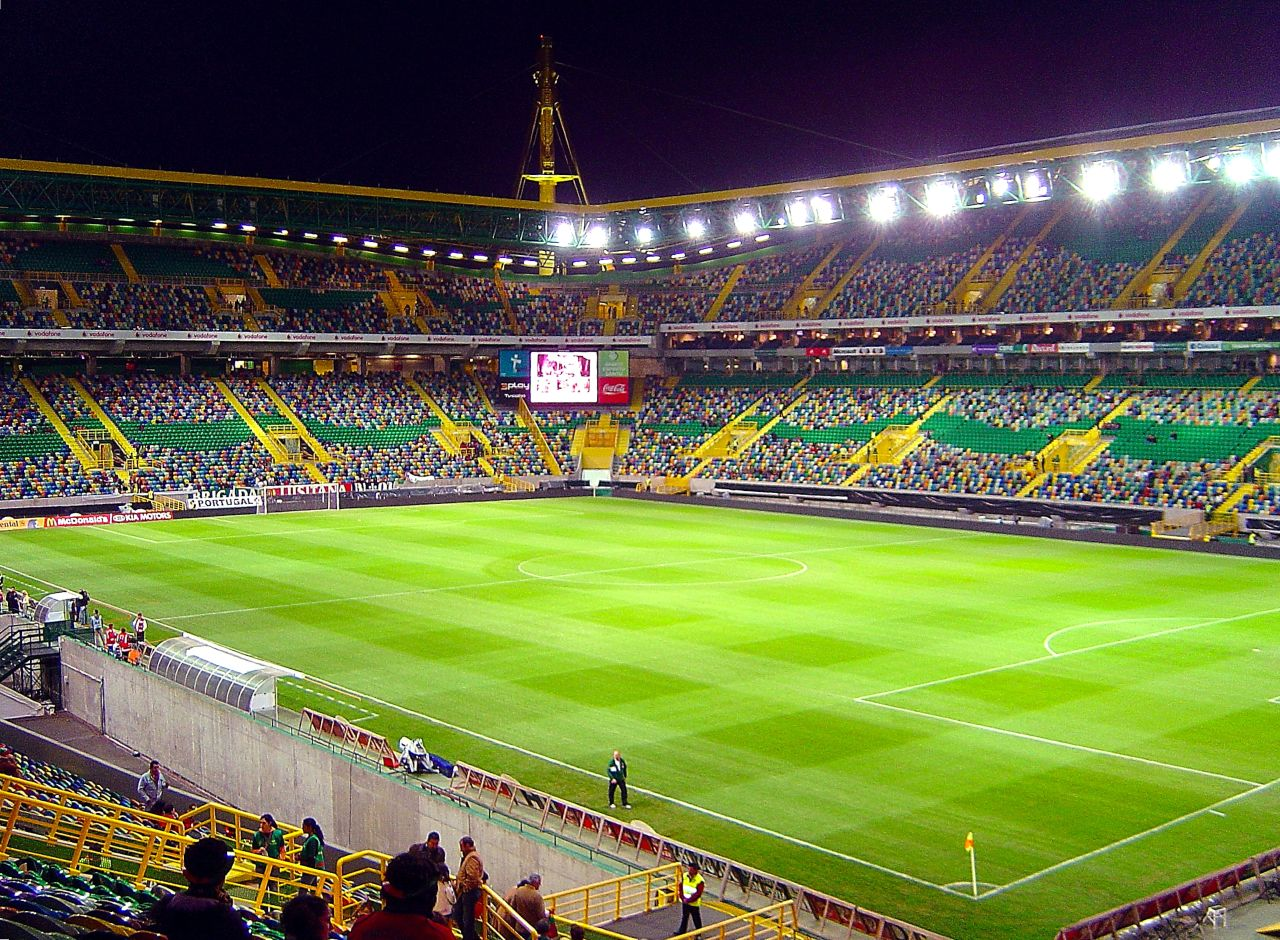
Estádio José Alvalade
Capacity: 52,095

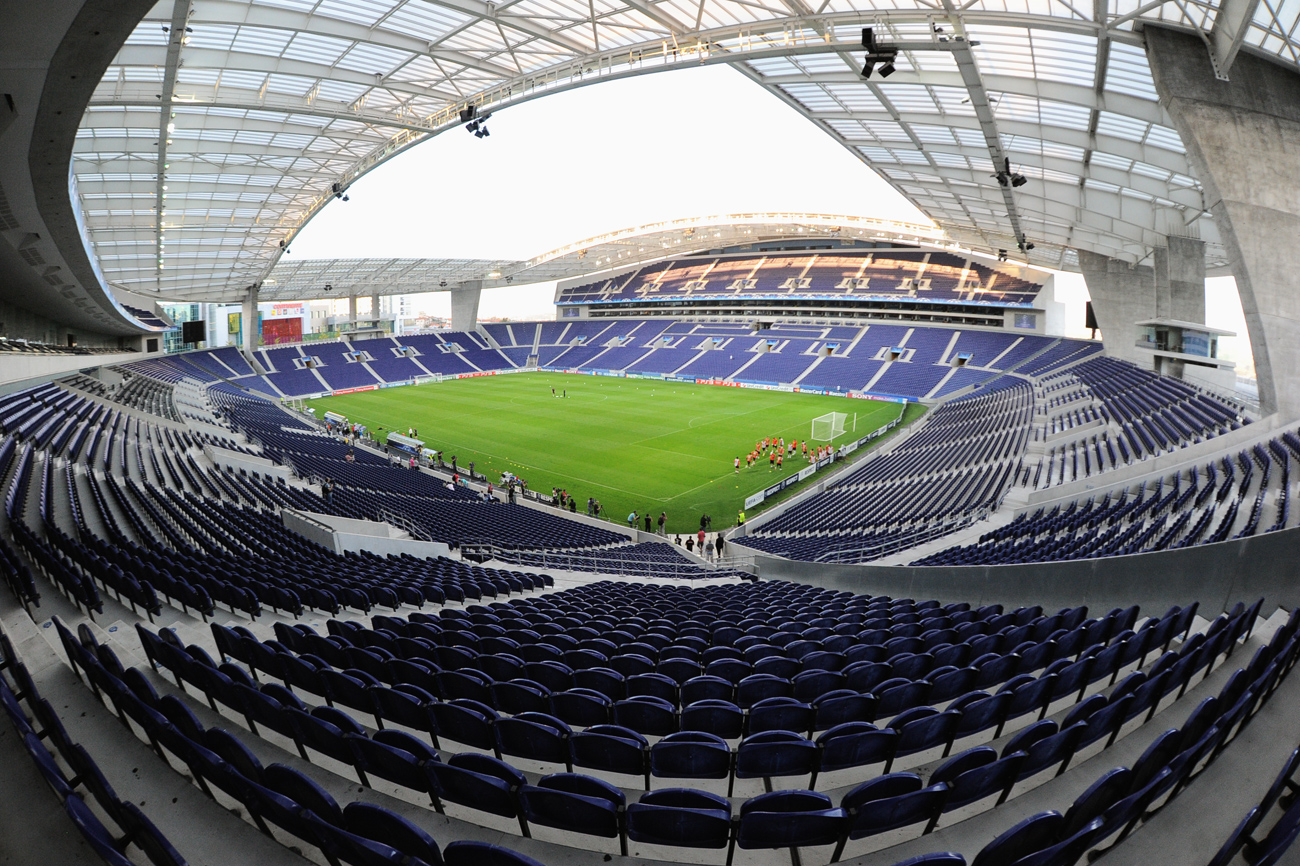
Estádio do Dragão
Capacity: 50,033

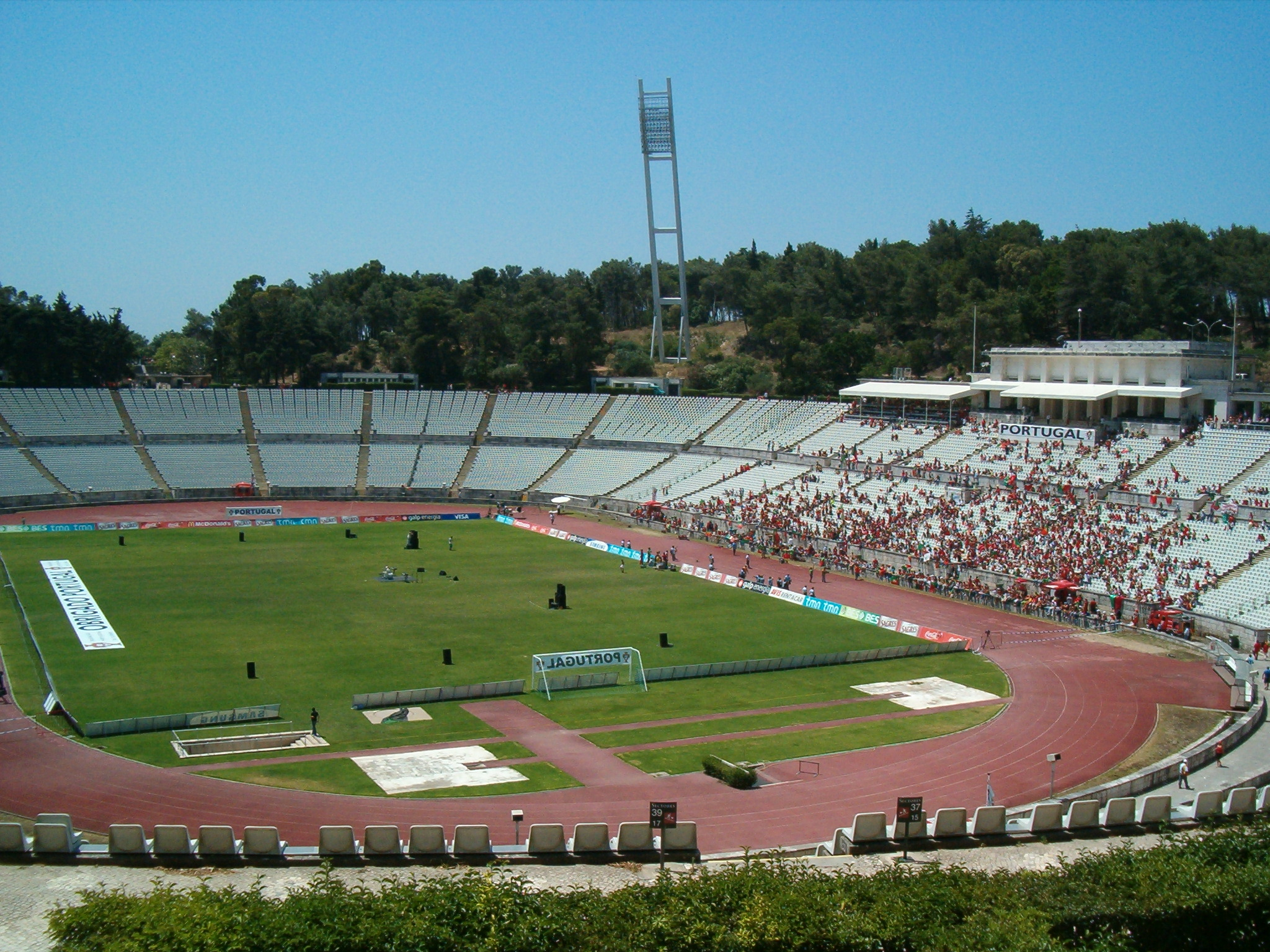
Estádio Nacional
Capacity: 37,593

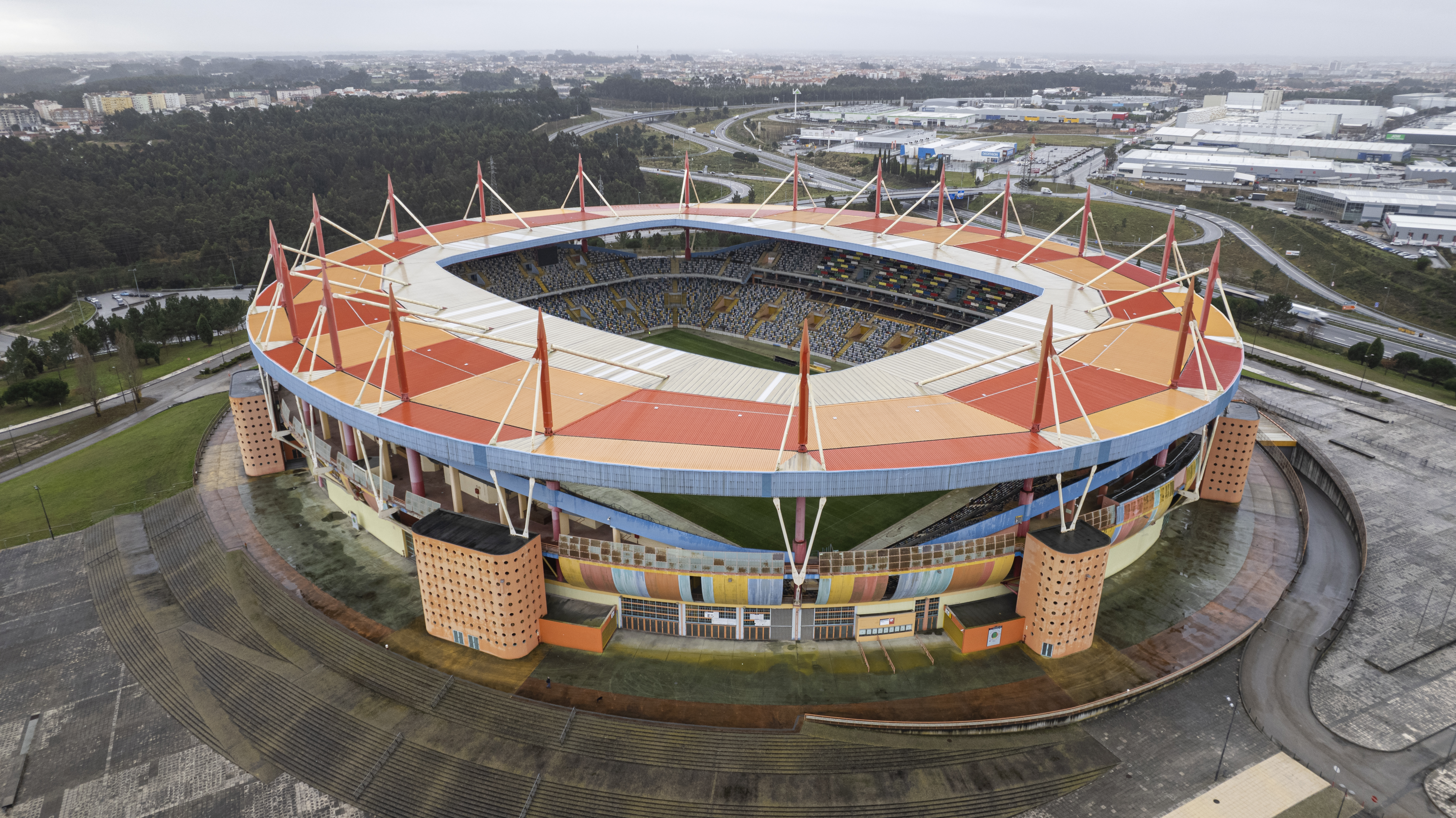
Estádio Municipal de Aveiro
Capacity: 32,830

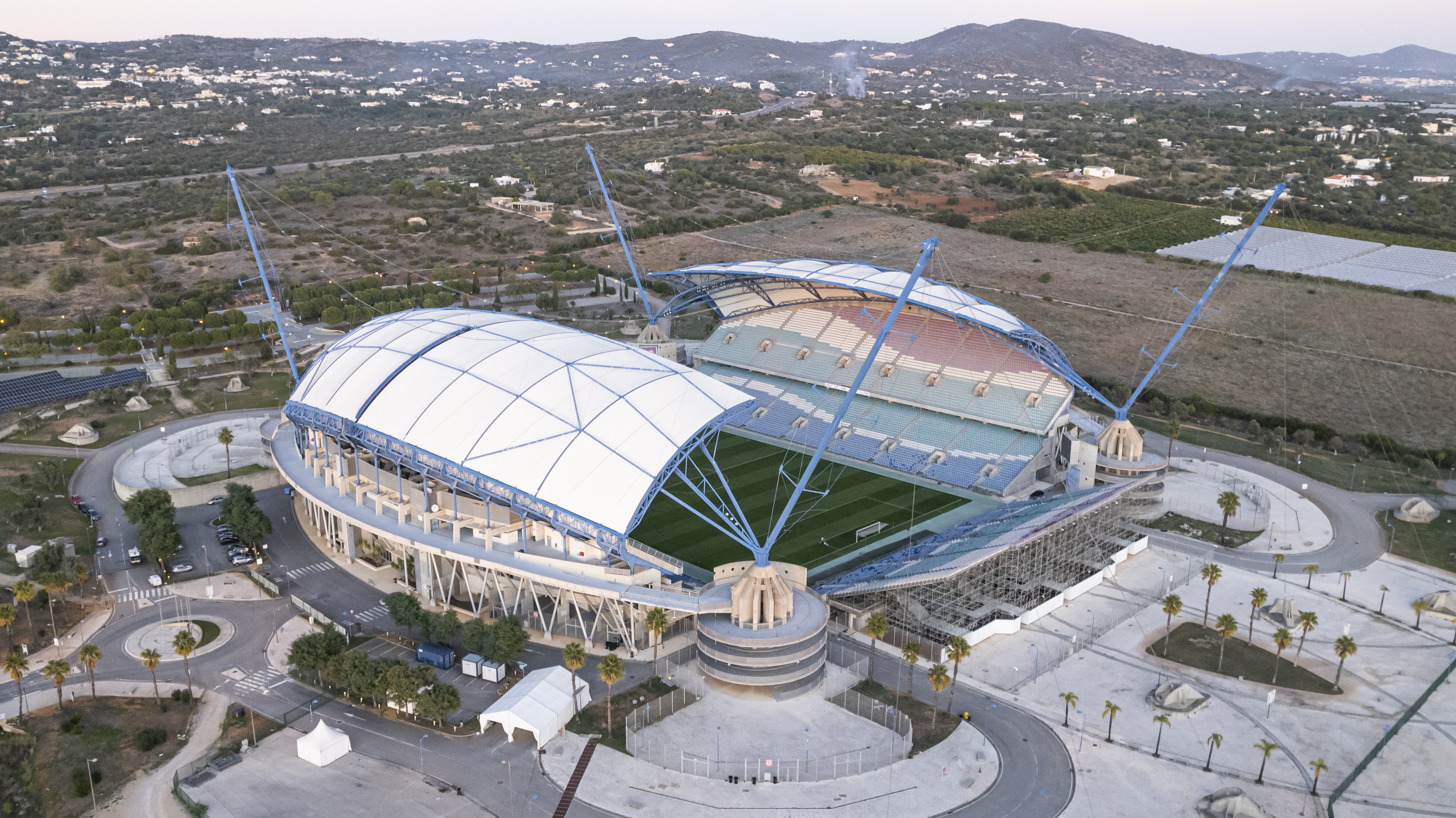
Estádio Algarve
Capacity: 30,305

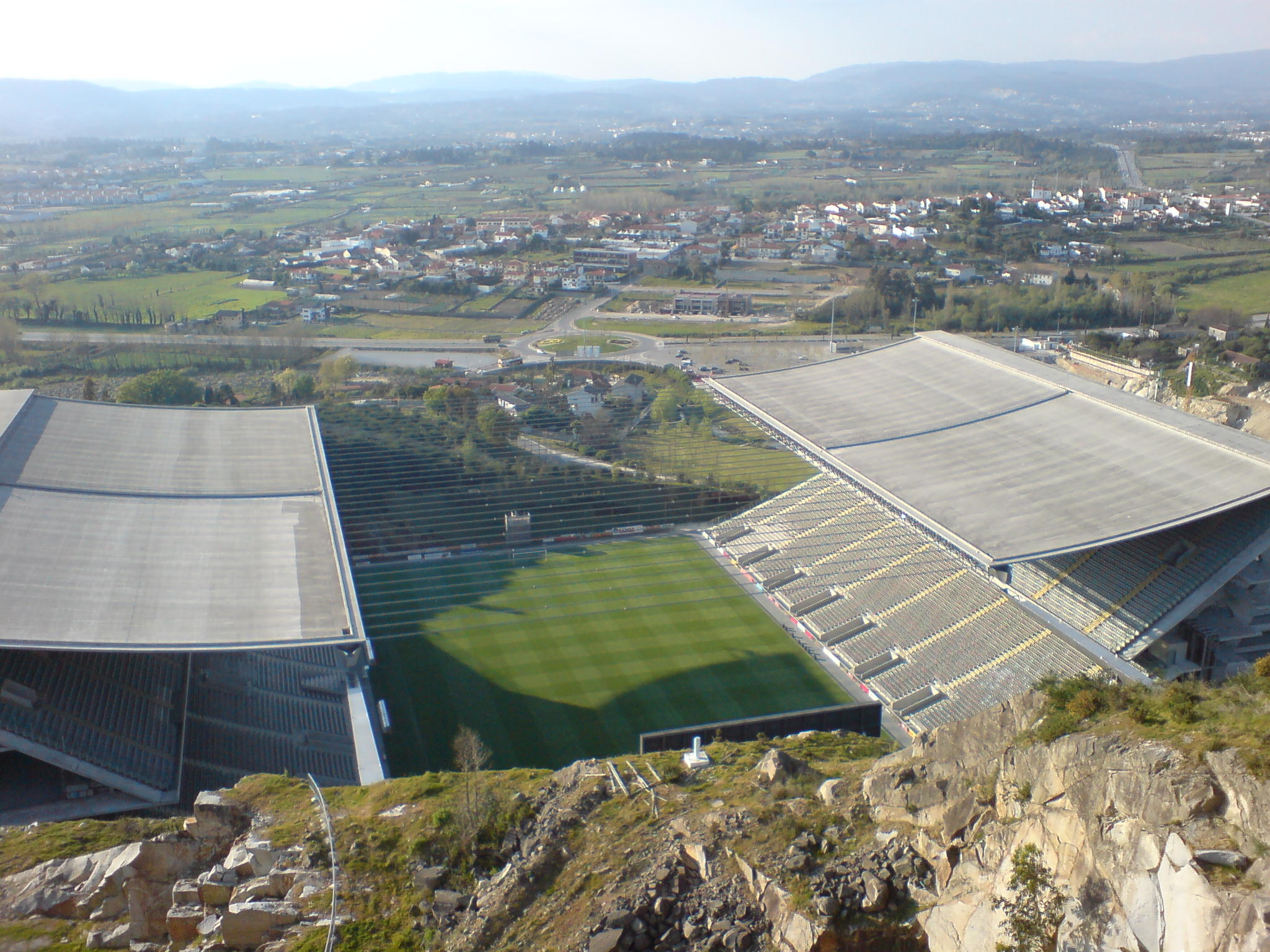
Estádio Municipal de Braga
Capacity: 30,286

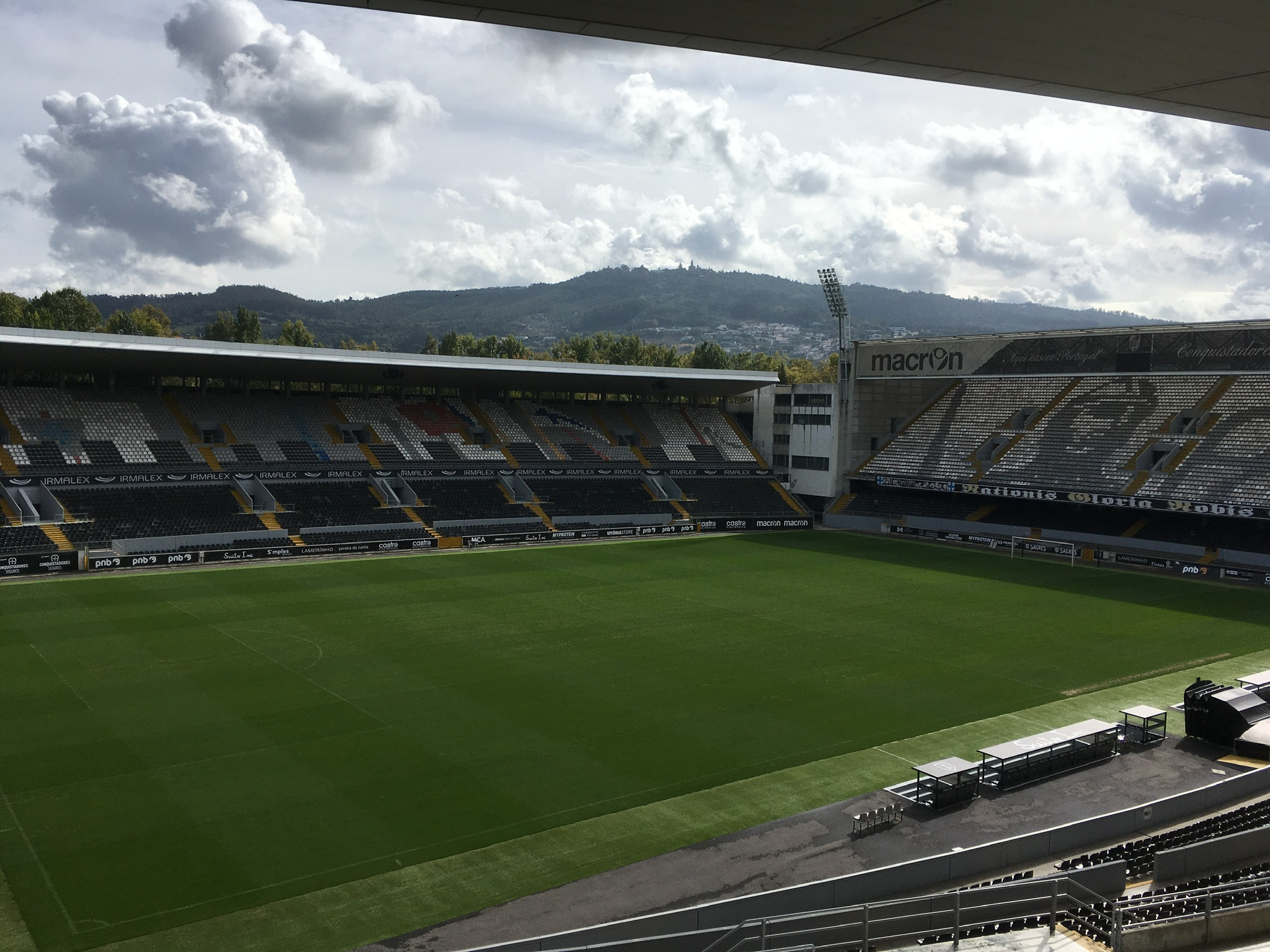
Estádio D. Afonso Henriques
Capacity: 30,029

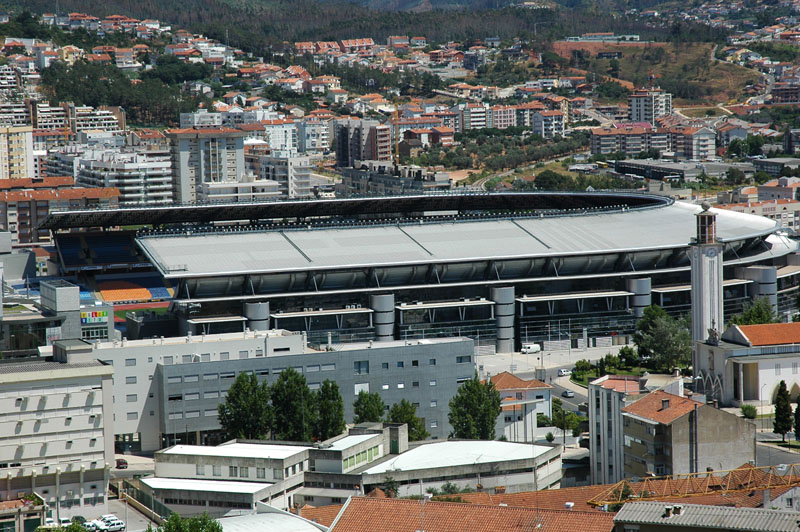
Estádio Cidade de Coimbra
Capacity: 29,622

== Attendances ==
The average attendance per top-flight football league season and the club with the highest average attendance:

Season	League average	Best club average	
2024–25	12,295	SL Benfica	58,746
2023–24	12,115	SL Benfica	56,248
2022–23	11,621	SL Benfica	57,107
2021–22	7,753	SL Benfica	31,956
2020–21	—	—	—
2019–20	11,140	SL Benfica	52,479
2018–19	11,692	SL Benfica	53,824
2017–18	11,945	SL Benfica	53,209
2016–17	11,838	SL Benfica	55,952
2015–16	10,803	SL Benfica	50,322
2014–15	10,101	SL Benfica	48,520
2013–14	10,217	SL Benfica	43,613
2012–13	9,803	SL Benfica	42,366
2011–12	10,957	SL Benfica	42,464
2010–11	10,080	SL Benfica	38,146
2009–10	10,901	SL Benfica	50,033
2008–09	10,390	FC Porto	38,763
2007–08	11,216	FC Porto	38,632
2006–07	10,636	SL Benfica	39,010
2005–06	10,600	SL Benfica	43,057
2004–05	10,624	FC Porto	36,038
2003–04	9,468	FC Porto	34,143
2002–03	7,012	FC Porto	28,248
2001–02	8,098	SL Benfica	29,924
2000–01	7,382	SL Benfica	27,206
1999–2000	8,637	Sporting CP	28,824
1998–99	7,424	SL Benfica	27,941
1997–98	8,134	SL Benfica	31,588
1996–97	7,656	FC Porto	27,765
1995–96	6,861	FC Porto	24,882
1994–95	9,807	FC Porto	31,941
1993–94	10,047	SL Benfica	31,294
1992–93	10,512	FC Porto	26,529
1991–92	11,527	FC Porto	30,824
1990–91	12,007	SL Benfica	42,368
1989–90	13,402	FC Porto	43,824
1988–89	14,589	SL Benfica	50,789
1987–88	13,748	FC Porto	42,734
1986–87	18,988	SL Benfica	55,333
1985–86	17,894	SL Benfica	50,667
1984–85	15,871	FC Porto	45,000
