= Derby do Minho =

Portuguese football club rivalry

The Derby do Minho (English: Minho derby) is the oldest rivalry and one of the biggest football derby match in Portugal. It is played between SC Braga and Vitória SC, the two most representative clubs in the Minho region.

More than a rivalry between two sports clubs, it is a rivalry between two historic and neighboring cities, which dates back before the foundation of the nationality, in a dispute between the power of the Archbishops of Braga and the Counts of the County of Portugal. From then until today, there have been several demonstrations of rivalry between the two sides, thus justifying the fact that there is no railway line between the two cities (but rather two isolated branches that connect each city to Porto) or the controversy surrounding the creation of the University of Minho.

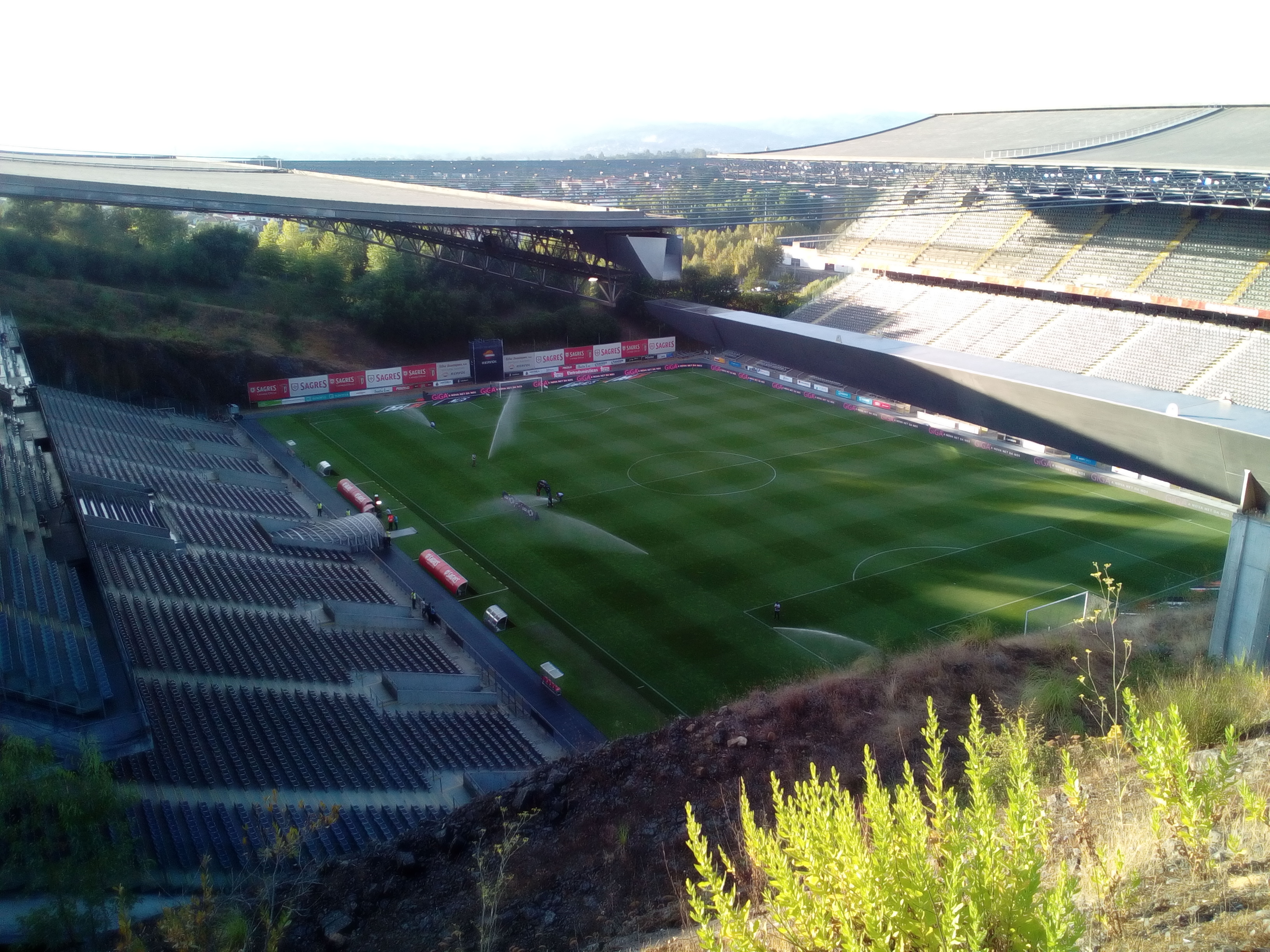
Braga's Estádio Municipal de Braga

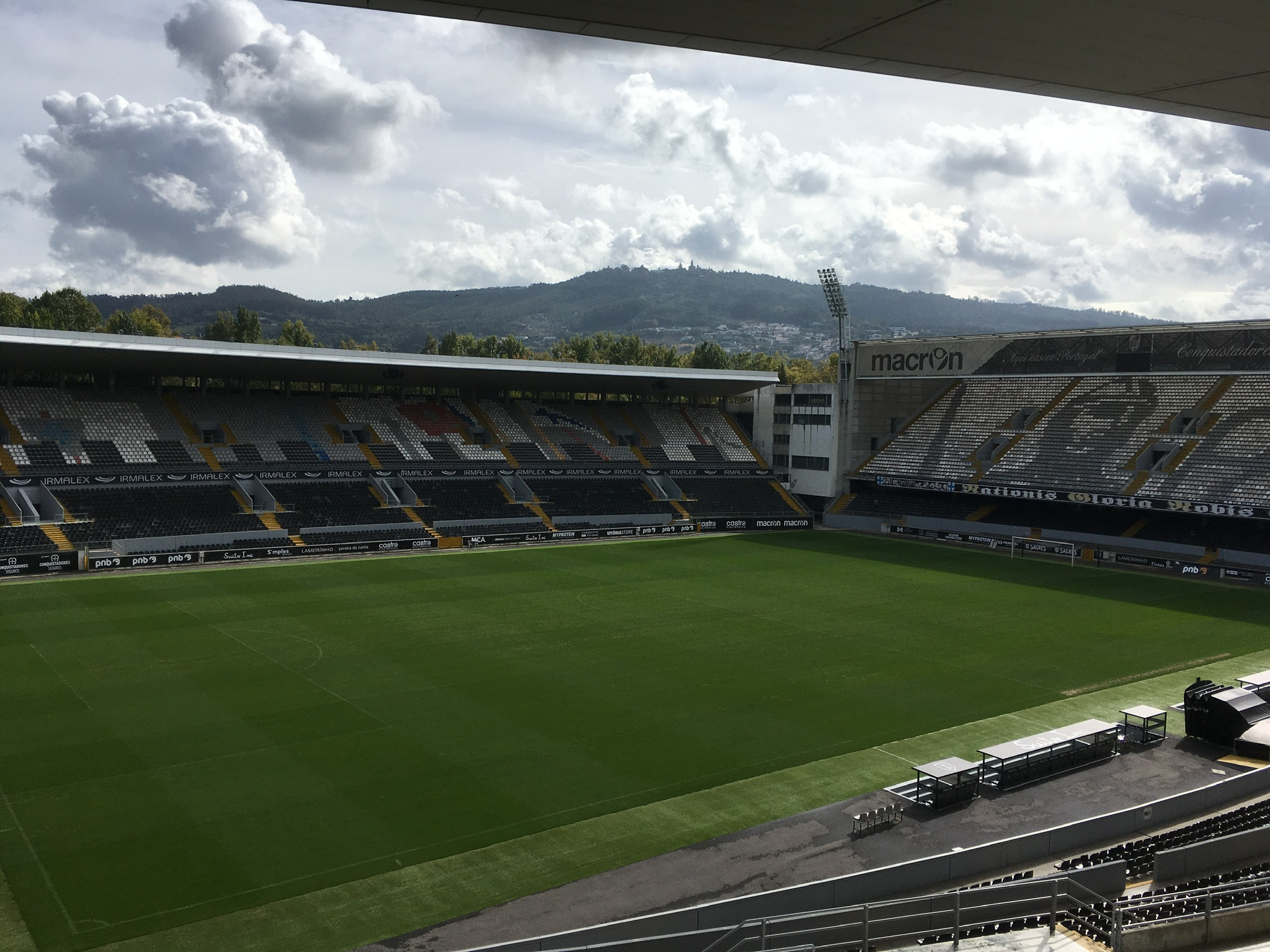
Vitória's Estádio D. Afonso Henriques

Thus the rivalry between SC Braga and Vitória SC is more a reflection of a rivalry between the society of both cities. People from Braga and Guimarães do not like each other. The first are called "marroquinos (moroccans)", the others "espanhóis (spanish)", and beyond the border is enemy land. However, just like the cities to which they belong, there is much more in common between them than what separates them:

- The official founding date of SC Braga dates back to 1921, while that of Vitória SC dates back to 1922.
- In 2025, Braga has around 30,000 members while Vitória has around 39,000 members.
- They have managed to win titles (both in senior and youth teams) outside the sphere of the big three.
- In the 21st century, these are the clubs that, in sporting terms, cause the most difficulties for the so-called Big Three and that normally compete for the highest positions in the Portuguese League and in qualifying for European competitions.
- Apart from the so-called Big Three, they are the only clubs to maintain a considerable fan base, always with good attendances at home, which provide exciting games and an electrifying spectacle from the stands with great tifos and choreographies.
- Both teams always have good away trips, playing at their opponents' grounds as their home ground, as they have a numerical advantage in most Portuguese stadiums, due to the geographical proximity of the League clubs.

== Media coverage of the Derby do Minho ==
SC Braga and Vitória SC are recognised for the quality of their infrastructure and teams, but they are much better known for the rivalry between their fans and members, which is why they are placed in an intermediate position between the Big Three and the other clubs. In fact, the Minho derby is considered to be the 4th most popular match among fans across the country, right after the Classics, with the respective cities of Braga and Guimarães awaiting the game. This derby has more than one hundred and fifty official matches.

In terms of home and away attendances, Vitória stands out compared to Braga because there is a deeply rooted culture of support, marked by localism and the strong connection of the fans to their local club. Even when the team is not in the top positions, Vitória continues to record high average attendances because the support base remains loyal regardless of the results. However, on the Braga side, given the excellent and more regular sporting results obtained at the turn of the century, they have gradually managed to increase their average due to the change in the mentality of the fans, many of whom were previously biclubistas (they also support one of the big three) and now tend to support the city club more exclusively.

=== Audience development ===
Data in this graph is from EFS Attendances and since 2009/10 from Liga Portugal.

== History of rivalry ==
At the beginning of its existence, the rivalry between Guimarães and Braga was more about the fight for the leadership of the Braga FA than sport, since most of the matches were played against teams from the same city. In Braga, SC Braga had several opponents such as Braga Sport Club (SCB's great rival at the time), Braga Football Club, Liberdade Foot-ball Club and Soarense. Vitória, on the other hand, exercised greater hegemony in the city of Guimarães, owing its origins to a football group founded in 1913 with two teams, the first being Sport Club Vimaranense and the second Foot-ball Grupo Vimaranense, which later became one.

=== Beginnings ===
The first regional championships were dominated by SC Braga and only in 1936/37, after 10 Bracarenses titles, did Vitorianos manage to impose themselves in the regional championship, witnessing a period of crisis for SC Braga. It was precisely during this period that the Portuguese Football Championship was created in 1934/35, and only from 1941/42 onwards did the AF Braga Champion qualify for the First Division (until then they qualified for the Second Division, with the First Division reserved for clubs from Lisbon, Porto, Coimbra and Setúbal).

In 1946/47, the competitive framework of Portuguese football was reformulated, ending qualification based on regional championships, and introducing a logic of continuity between editions, and a system of promotions and relegations between divisions. The First Division was expanded to 14 teams, while the Second Division was reformulated, and a Third Division was created. In this way, Vitória SC was integrated into the I Division (as champion) while SC Braga was relegated to the II Division, no longer participating in the district championship on that date. SC Braga would go on to achieve promotion in the same season, retaking Minhoto.

Since that date, both clubs have only been absent from the First Division for 3 seasons: in 1956/57, from 1961/62 and 1963/64, from 1970/71 to 1974/75 (SC Braga's seasons in the Second Division) and from 1955/56 to 1957/58 and 2006/07 (Vitória's seasons in the second tier).It's worth noting that in 1947, after Braga's victory in Montijo, which earned them promotion to the First Division, the SCB delegation was honored in Famalicão, with Vitória represented by António Faria Martins, who said:

"As it was impossible for the caravan accompanying Sporting Clube de Braga to pass through Guimarães, Vitória wanted to join in this very deserved tribute through its illustrious President, Mr. Antero da Silva."

— Evandro Lopes, The History of the Ball in Braga

=== National affirmation ===
Between 1970 and 1985, Vitória frequently managed to finish the championship among the top 6, while SC Braga managed to do so with some regularity between 1975 and 1985. Braga and Guimarães would become difficult trips for any national club. Between 1985 and 2003, both clubs had somewhat irregular careers, alternating top positions with more modest classifications. However, in the 80s and 90s, Vitória achieved several European qualifications (10 in total) and good campaigns in Europe, even reaching the Quarter-finals of the UEFA Cup in 1987.

=== European glory ===
The 21st century brings a change in the status quo. In 2006/07 Vitória was forced to play in the Second League (after 48 uninterrupted years in the top tier of Portuguese football), but in the following season and after an excellent campaign in the League (3rd place in a cohesive team led by Manuel Cajuda) it managed to get involved in the fight for the championship, achieving historic qualification for the 3rd qualifying round of the 2008/09 Champions League . He would be eliminated from the group stage after two controversial games against Basel. However, it was a unique achievement, and Vitória in the following years would not achieve better than 4th place (2016/17) and 5th place (2010/11, 2014/15, 2018/19 and in 2023/24). In the Portuguese Cup, Vitória won the prestigious trophy after defeating Benfica 2–1 in the 2013 final at Jamor. Previously the club's only major domestic honor was the Cândido Oliveira Super Cup in 1988 against FC Porto.

In Braga, the start of the new century is synonymous with António Salvador, the businessman who takes over the club's management and takes it from modest rankings to the big European nights. Since 2003, SC Braga has managed to finish the League in 2nd place (2009/10, where it fought until the last round for the title), 3rd place (2011/12 and 2019/20) and 7 times in 4th place. In the meantime, they managed to qualify for the Champions League group stage twice, reach the Europa League final and win the Intertoto Cup (the only international trophy won by a Portuguese club that is not part of the so-called big three). At national level, it also won the League Cup in 2013 and 2020 (both times won against FC Porto), and in 2015 and 2016 it reached the final of the Portuguese Cup, having lost the 2015 final against Sporting and won the 2016 final against FC Porto, both decided on penalties.

=== Present ===
In recent years, SC Braga has established a consistent and competitive presence in the Minho region. The club has generated regular financial returns through player sales and constantly appearing in UEFA competitions.

In the 2020/21 season, Sporting de Braga won its 3rd Portuguese Cup, after defeating Benfica 2–0 at the Estádio Cidade de Coimbra.

On the Guimarães side, and after the departure of the historic leader Pimenta Machado in 2004 (24 years at the club, leading Vitória to good sporting and financial performances at that time), there have been successive changes in the presidency, and after several seasons with mediocre results at a sporting level, and terrible in the financial chapter, a campaign began under the presidency of Júlio Mendes, with a view to reducing the club's liabilities (it went from 24 million euros at the end of 2012, to practically 12 million at the end of the 2014/15 season).

In 2016/17, Vitória Sport Club reached 4th place in the League, 9 years later ahead of rivals SC Braga in the league table.

In the Portuguese Cup, he reached his 7th final in the Queen of Portuguese Football Competition (third in the last 7 years). Strongly supported by its fans, Pedro Martins' team was defeated in Jamor by National Champion Benfica by 2–1, thus failing to bring the Cup to the Birth City.

In the 2025/26 season, Vitória SC secured their first League Cup trophy, historic for being the first Minho Derby in a competition final. The final took place after eliminating FC Porto 1–3 at the Estádio do Dragão in the quarter-finals, and then defeating Sporting CP 1–2 in Leiria in the semi-finals, both with comebacks. In the Minho final, Vitória again came from behind to beat SC Braga 2–1, winning their first League Cup trophy in history, and also becoming the first club to win the competition with only comebacks in the result.

== Modalities ==
In addition to football, the sporting rivalry between SC Braga and Vitória SC has been experienced mainly at youth level, where they always provide highly anticipated and emotional duels. However, when it comes to the derby matches in the top divisions of national competitions, they are less frequent, as each institution has chosen to invest in different disciplines while still being able to fight for titles.

SC Braga has invested more heavily in Futsal and Beach Soccer (extinct in 2024), while Vitória SC has invested in Volleyball, Basketball, Water Polo and Handball (reactivated in 2020), which are the most representative sports and also have the most fan support.

== Clubs' participations ==
Counting the seasons since 1934–35 (Date of official creation of the First and Second Division National Championships).

Latest Update – June 15, 2024

National Competitions	Vitória Sport Clube			Sporting Clube de Braga		
National Competitions	Participations	Matches	Titles	Participations	Matches	Titles
Primeira Liga	81	2409	0	70	2143	0
Taça de Portugal	82	297	1	78	318	3
Portuguese Super Cup	4	5	1	4	5	0
Portuguese League Cup	19	52	1	19	66	3
Segunda Liga	1	30	0	0	0	0
II Division ^{Extinct}	9	162	0	21	398	2
PFF Cup ^{Extinct}	1	6	0	1	8	1
Ribeiro dos Reis Cup ^{Extinct}	6	51	0	8	60	0
International Competitions	Participations	Matches	Titles	Participations	Matches	Titles
UEFA Champions League	1 (POFF)	2	0	2	18	0
UEFA Europa League	16	72	0	17	121	0
UEFA Conference League	1	8	0	1	2	0
UEFA Cup Winners' Cup ^{Extinct}	1	2	0	3	10	0
Inter-Cities Fairs Cup ^{Extinct}	2	8	0	0	0	0
UEFA Intertoto Cup ^{Extinct}	2	12	0	1	2	1

== Clubs' honours ==
Vitória Sport Clube	Sporting Clube de Braga
Champions League Third qualifying round: 2008/09	Champions League Group stage: 2010/11; 2012/13; 2023/24
Europa League Quarter-finals: 1986/87	Europa League Runner-up: 2010/11
Conference League League phase: 2024/25	Conference League Round of 16: 2022/23
Intertoto Cup 2nd in the group: 1974; 1976	Intertoto Cup Winner: 2008/09
Primeira Liga 3rd place: 1968/69; 1986/87; 1997/98; 2007/08	Primeira Liga 2nd place: 2009/10
Taça de Portugal Winner: 2012/13 Runner-up: 1941/42; 1962/63; 1975/76; 1987/88; 2010/11, 2016/17	Taça de Portugal Winner: 1965/66; 2015/16; 2020/21 Runner-up: 1976/77; 1981/82; 1997/98; 2014/15
Portuguese Super Cup Winner: 1988 Runner-up: 2011; 2013; 2017	Portuguese Super Cup Runner-up: 1982; 1998; 2016; 2021
Portuguese League Cup Winner: 2025/26	Portuguese League Cup Winner: 2012/13; 2019/20; 2023/24
Portuguese Football Federation Cup 2nd in the group: 1976/77	Portuguese Football Federation Cup Winner: 1976/77
Ribeiro dos Reis Cup 2nd in the group: 1969/70; 1970/71	Ribeiro dos Reis Cup Runner-up:1970/71
II Divisão / Segunda Liga 2nd place: 1955/56; 1957/58; 2006/07	II Divisão / Segunda Liga Winner: 1946/47; 1963/64

== Clubs' titles ==
=== Senior football ===
List of official competitions, at regional, national and international level, common to both clubs throughout history, and the respective number of titles won by Vitória Sport Clube and Sporting Clube de Braga.

International Competitions	Vitória SC	SC Braga
Intertoto Cup	–	1
Total (International)	0	1
National Competitions	Vitória SC	SC Braga
Primeira Liga	–	–
Campeonato de Portugal / Taça de Portugal	1	3
Supertaça Cândido de Oliveira	1	–
Taça da Liga	1	3
Taça Federação Portuguesa de Futebol	–	1
Taça Ribeiro dos Reis	–	–
II Divisão / Segunda Liga	–	2*
Total (National)	3	7
Regional Competitions	Vitória SC	SC Braga
Campeonato do Minho	3	–
Campeonato AF Braga	12	13
Taça de Honra AF Braga	4	3
Taça da AF Braga	1	–
Torneio Abertura AF Braga	–	2
Campeonato AF Braga (Reservas)	8*	6*
Liga do Futuro (North)	1*	–
Total (Regional)	29	24
Total Official	32	32

* Means competitions at lower levels and/or won by reserve teams.

=== Youth football ===
List of official competitions, at regional and national level, common to both clubs throughout history, and the respective number of titles won by Vitória Sport Clube and Sporting Clube de Braga.

National Competitions	Vitória SC	SC Braga
National Under-23 Championship	–	–
National Junior Championship – Under-19	1	3
National Youth Championship – Under-17	1	1
National Beginners Championship – Under-15	1	–
National Children's Championship – U-13	–	–
Total (National)	3	4
Regional Competitions	Vitória SC	SC Braga
Juniors (AF Braga Championship)	10	8
Juveniles (AF Braga Championship)	13	12
Beginners (AF Braga Championship)	14	14
Children's Fut. 11 (AF Braga Championship)	4	10
Children's Fut. 7 (AF Braga Championship)	14	13
Benjamins (AF Braga Championship)	33	25
Total (Regional)	88	82

== Confrontation history ==
=== Matches ===
Last match considered: Vitória SC vs SC Braga, 16 February 2025, Primeira Liga.

National Competitions	Vitória SC Wins	Draws	SC Braga Wins	Matches
Primeira Liga	51	30	52	133
Portuguese Cup	3	2	7	12
League Cup	1	1	2	4
FPF Cup	0	1	1	2
II Division	7	1	2	10
Total	62	35	64	161

Primeira Liga
Team	Home wins	Home draws	Home losses	Home matches	Goals scored
Vitória SC	39	15	12	66	168
SC Braga	40	14	12	66	170
Portuguese Cup
Team	Home wins	Home draws	Home losses	Home matches	Goals scored
Vitória SC	2	1	3	6	14
SC Braga	4	1	1	6	27
League Cup
Team	Home wins	Home draws	Home losses	Home matches	Goals scored
Vitória SC	0	1	0	1	2
SC Braga	2	0	0	2	5
II Divisão
Team	Home wins	Home draws	Home losses	Home matches	Goals scored
Vitória SC	4	0	1	5	28
SC Braga	1	1	3	5	15
FPF Cup
Team	Home wins	Home draws	Home losses	Home matches	Goals scored
Vitória SC	0	0	1	1	0
SC Braga	0	1	0	1	1
Home total
Vitória SC	45	17	17	79	212
SC Braga	47	17	16	80	218

=== Finals ===
League Cup

Época	Local	Campeão	Finalista vencido	Resultado
2025–26	Estádio Dr. Magalhães Pessoa	Vitória SC	SC Braga	2–1

=== Latest matches ===
Vitória SC at Estádio D. Afonso Henriques
Date	Score	Competition	Attendance
16 de fevereiro de 2025	0–0	Primeira Liga	28,133
11 de maio de 2024	2–3	Primeira Liga	25,224
27 de fevereiro de 2023	2–1	Primeira Liga	19,072
05 de fevereiro de 2022	2–1	Primeira Liga	15,322
25 de outubro de 2020	0–1	Primeira Liga	0
10 de novembro de 2019	0–2	Primeira Liga	24,429
26 de outubro de 2018	1–1	Primeira Liga	26,170
18 de fevereiro de 2018	0–5	Primeira Liga	21,057
14 de agosto de 2016	0–1	Primeira Liga	20,859
27 de setembro de 2015	0–1	Primeira Liga	19,545
17 de abril de 2015	1–0	Primeira Liga	15,344
23 de novembro de 2014	1–2	Taça de Portugal	–
10 de maio de 2014	1–0	Primeira Liga	10,679
16 de janeiro de 2013	1–1 (2–1)	Taça de Portugal	7,870

SC Braga at Estádio Municipal de Braga
Date	Score	Competition	Attendance
15 de setembro de 2024	0–2	Primeira Liga	21,215
06 de janeiro de 2024	1–1	Primeira Liga	22,385
11 de janeiro de 2023	3–2	Taça de Portugal	–
03 de setembro de 2022	1–0	Primeira Liga	21,736
29 de agosto de 2021	0–0	Primeira Liga	7,590
09 de março de 2021	3–0	Primeira Liga	0
25 de junho de 2020	3–2	Primeira Liga	0
09 de março de 2019	1–0	Primeira Liga	16,778
17 de setembro de 2017	2–1	Primeira Liga	14,185
22 de janeiro de 2017	1–2	Primeira Liga	20,963
21 de fevereiro de 2016	3–3	Primeira Liga	13,241
07 de dezembro de 2014	0–0	Primeira Liga	13,325
10 de janeiro de 2014	3–0	Primeira Liga	12,577
23 de fevereiro de 2013	3–2	Primeira Liga	15,136

=== Records in confrontations ===
==== Vitória SC ====
- Biggest home win : Vitória SC 9–2 SC Braga ( II Division Série Minho 1938/39 )
- Biggest away win : SC Braga 3–5 Vitória SC ( 1965/66 First Division ); SC Braga 2–4 Vitória SC ( 1999/00 First League ); ( 2002/03 First League )

==== SC Braga ====
- Biggest home win : SC Braga 5–0 Vitória SC ( 1959/60 First Division ); ( 1966/67 Portuguese Cup )
- Biggest away win : Vitória SC 0–5 SC Braga ( 1956/57 North Zone II Division ); ( 2017/18 First League )
