= League cup =

Sports tournament type

In several sports, most prominently association football, a league cup or secondary cup generally signifies a cup competition for which entry is restricted only to teams in a particular league. The first national association football tournament to be called "League Cup" was held in Scotland in 1946–47 and was entitled the Scottish League Cup. However, in the Republic of Ireland the now-defunct League of Ireland Shield was the first national league-only tournament of its kind (played first in 1921); this was subsequently replaced by the League of Ireland Cup in 1983.

The creation of a league cup marked the difference from the domestic cup (or primary cup), which is generally also open to teams from multiple leagues, often as far down as regional amateur leagues, and who are also members of the country's football association. League cups are less prevalent than domestic cups.

The creation of a tournament of this kind exclusively for the top national-level league teams, in addition to the two main domestic association football tournaments of the league and association cup, also created a new national footballing achievement called the domestic "treble". The first national league treble of this kind was won by Shamrock Rovers of the Republic of Ireland in 1925.

League cups were generally introduced after the Second World War – for example, the Football League Cup in England in 1960 – although in other countries they were created following a rise in the number of floodlit stadiums, allowing regular midweek matches.

In certain countries, the league cup had, or in some cases still has, group stages in the early stages. These often opened the season before the main league season began.

== List of league cups and secondary cups in association football ==
=== Men's league cups ===
==== Africa ====
- (Algeria) Algerian League Cup
- (Egypt) Egyptian League Cup
- (Kenya) KPL Top 8 Cup
- South Africa
  - MTN 8 – first tier
  - Telkom Knockout – second tier

==== Asia ====
- Australia
  - Canale Cup – regional competition
- (Philippines) Copa Paulino Alcantara
- Indonesia League Cup
- (Japan) J.League Cup
- Jordan FA Shield
- Kuwait Federation Cup
- Malaysia Cup
- (North Korea) Hwaebul Cup
- Oman Professional League Cup
- (Qatar) Qatari Stars Cup
- (Thailand) Thai League Cup
- (United Arab Emirates) UAE League Cup

==== Europe ====
- England
  - EFL Cup (formerly the Football League Cup) – tiers 1–4
  - EFL Trophy (formerly the Football League Trophy) – tiers 3–4 (16 U-21 teams of tier 1 and 2 clubs)
  - National League Cup — tier 5 (plus 16 professional under-21 teams playing in Premier League 2)
  - Isthmian League Cup – regional competition
  - Northern Premier League Challenge Cup – regional competition
  - Northern Premier League President's Cup – regional competition
  - Southern Football League Cup – regional competition
- (Finland) Finnish League Cup
- (Iceland) Icelandic League Cup
- (Republic of Ireland) League of Ireland Cup
- (Israel) Toto Cup
- (Italy) Coppa Italia Dilettanti (tiers 5 and 6)
- (Northern Ireland) Irish League Cup
- (Portugal) Taça da Liga
- (Russia) FNL Cup
- Scotland
  - Scottish League Cup – first tier
  - Scottish Challenge Cup – second tier
- Spain
  - Copa Federación de España – tiers 3, 4 and 5
- (Wales) Welsh League Cup

==== North America ====
- (Canada) / (Mexico) / (United States) Leagues Cup

==== South America ====
- Copa Bolivia
- (Ecuador) Copa de la Liga
- (Chile) Copa de la Liga
- (Peru) Copa de la Liga
- (Uruguay) Copa de la Liga AUF

=== Women's league cups ===
==== Europe ====
- England
  - Women's League Cup — first tier
  - WNL Cup — second tier
- (France) Coupe LFFP
- (Iceland) Icelandic League Cup
- (Portugal) Taça da Liga Feminina
- (Scotland) SWPL Cup

==== Asia ====
- (Japan) WE League Cup

==== North America ====
- (Canada) Women's Inter-Provincial Championship

== Defunct league cups and secondary cups ==
=== Men's league cups ===
==== Africa ====
- (Egypt) EFA League Cup
- (Libya) Libyan League Cup
- Tunisia Coupe de la Ligue Professionel

==== Asia ====
- Australia
  - NSL Cup – first tier
  - NNSWF State Cup – regional competition
- (China) Chinese Super League Cup
- (Iraq) Baghdad Championship
- Japan Soccer League Cup (1973–1991), Konica Cup (1990 and 1991)
- (Lebanon) Lebanese Elite Cup (1996–2023), Lebanese Challenge Cup (2013–2023)
- (Philippines) UFL Cup
- (South Korea) Korean League Cup

==== Europe ====
- (Belgium) Belgian League Cup
- (Denmark) Spar Cup, Danish League Cup, Viasat Cup
- (East Germany) Olympia-Pokal (1964), Fuwo-Pokal (1972), DFV-Toto-Sonderrunde (1974 and 1976)
- (England) Full Members Cup (tiers 1–2), Super Cup, Centenary Trophy (tier 1)
- (France) Coupe Charles Drago
- (France) Coupe de la Ligue
- (Germany) DFL-Ligapokal (1997–2007)
- Gibraltar Premier Cup
- (Greece) Greek League Cup (tier 1), Gamma Ethniki Cup (tier 3), Greek Football Amateur Cup (tiers 3–6)
- (Northern Ireland) Ulster Cup (1949–2003), Floodlit Cup (1987–1998), Gold Cup (1911–2001)
- (Latvia) Virsligas Winter Cup
- (Norway) Norwegian League Cup (1992 and 1993)
- (Poland) Young Leaders Rally Cup (1952), League Cup (1977 and 1978), Polish League Cup (1999–2002), Ekstraklasa Cup (2006–2009)
- (Portugal) Cup Ribeiro dos Reis (1961-1971), Federation Cup (1976-1978)
- (Romania) Cupa Ligii
- (Russia) Russian Premier League Cup
- (Scotland) Saint Mungo Cup, Summer Cup (tier 1), War Emergency Cup (tier 1), Supplementary Cup (tier 2), C Division League Cup (tier 3), Southern League Cup
- (Soviet Union) All-Union Committee of Physical Culture and Sports Tournament (1952), USSR Federation Cup
- (Spain) Copa de la Liga
- (Switzerland) Swiss League Cup
- (Turkey) Spor Toto Cup
- (Ukraine) Ukrainian Second League Cup (a preliminary tournament for the Ukrainian Cup that involved third-tier teams along with best teams of Ukrainian Amateur Cup; the Ukrainian League Cup was a single season supplemental tournament for the third-tier teams of 2009–10 Ukrainian Second League and involved participation of some reserve and amateur teams)
- (Wales) FAW Premier Cup

==== North America ====
- (Canada) / (United States) / (Mexico) North American SuperLiga
- Trinidad and Tobago
  - Trinidad and Tobago League Cup
  - Trinidad and Tobago Pro Bowl

==== South America ====
- (Argentina) Copa de la Liga Profesional
- (Argentina) Copa de la Superliga
- (Peru) Torneo Intermedio
- (Uruguay) Torneo Liguilla

=== Women's league cups ===
==== Asia ====
- (Japan) Nadeshiko League Cup
- (Philippines) PFF Women's Cup

==== North America ====
- (United States) NWSL Challenge Cup (2020–2023, supercup from 2024)

== League cups and secondary cups in other sports ==
=== Basketball ===
==== Men's league cups ====
- (France) LNB Pro A Leaders Cup
- (France) LNB Pro B Leaders Cup
- (United Kingdom) BBL Cup (includes only British Basketball League teams)
- (Iceland) Icelandic League Cup (includes top two league levels)
- (Israel) Israeli Basketball State Cup (includes the top two levels, the Premier League and National League)
- (Israel) Israeli Basketball League Cup (separate cup for the Premier League and National League)
- (Italy) Coppa Italia (Serie A)
- (Italy) LNP Cup
- (Portugal) Portuguese League Cup
- (Serbia) KSS Cup (Second League)
- (Spain) Copa Princesa de Asturias (LEB Oro) - second tier
- (Switzerland) SBL Cup
- (United States) / (Canada) NBA Cup

==== Women's league cups ====
- (Iceland) Icelandic League Cup (includes top two league levels)
- (United States) WNBA Commissioner's Cup
