= Harry Hinton =

Harry Hinton may refer to:

- Harry Hinton (footballer) (1857–1948), British industrialist and pioneer of football in Portugal
- Harry Hinton (motorcyclist) (1909–1978), Australian former Grand Prix motorcycle road racer
