= Harry Hinton (footballer) =

English industrialist and football pioneer

- Born: Harry Carvelery Hinton; 8 January 1857; Funchal, Madeira, Portugal
- Died: 16 April 1948 (aged 91); Funchal, Madeira, Portugal
- Occupations: Industrialist; Athlete
- Known for: Introducing football to Portugal

Harry Carvelery Hinton (8 January 1857 – 16 April 1948) was an industrialist and a football pioneer who is widely regarded as one of the most important figures in the amateur beginnings of football in Portugal, organizing the first-ever football game in the country in 1875, at the age of 18.

== Early life ==
Harry Hinton was born in 1857 in Funchal, Madeira, as the son of William Hinton (1817–1904) and Mary Wallas, and as the heir to a family that dominated the banana trade. Although he studied in London, Hinton defined himself as a fully Madeiran. His father had sent him to Old Albion to learn finance because he seemed to have a knack for business from an early age.

== Sporting career ==
The Hintons had their summer residence in what was then Quinta da Achadinha in Camacha. Their yard was made of dirt and provided a perfect field for Hinton to play a sport that at the time was practically unknown in Portugal, called football. According to the chronicles, it was Hinton who in the summer of 1875, brought the first ball of football from England to the island. The 18-year-old Hinton explained the rules to his friends, most of them English from Madeira, but also some Portuguese from wealthy families, and then, on a summer afternoon, he organized the first-ever football match in Portugal at the Largo da Achada, which was played by British only. However, he might have taught young Madeirans how to play the game as well. At the time, in Funchal, people from the seaside had already disputed some football games with the crew of English ships who would dock at the port of Funchal. After completing his studies in England, Hinton took up residence on the island of Madeira.

In the 1920s, Hinton sponsored the Taça Hinton, a competition that pitted the regional champion against a team made up of the best athletes from the other teams. He particularly supported Club Sport Marítimo, which named him its honorary president and, in 1942, he became the first person to be distinguished as a 1st Class Golden Lion Member.

In addition to football, Hinton also enjoyed hunting, which he practiced alongside several nobles, such as King Carlos I, Albert I, Prince of Monaco, and the Nicholas Maximilianovitch, 4th Duke of Leuchtenberg.

== Industrial career ==
Hinton succeeded his father as the head of the William Hinton & Sons, based in Funchal, which under his leadership, became the largest industrial complex in Madeira. In addition to having considerably expanded the facilities, which included an analysis laboratory, and having acquired modern machinery, Hinton introduced methods designed to make the most of the raw material, namely the patented Hinton-Naudet and Hinton-Marsden systems, being the first aimed at obtaining maximum sucrose and the second at improving sugarcane crushing.

Hinton joined the assets of his father and father-in-law, which he used to invest in the treatment of sugarcane, eventually becoming the largest production of sugar and alcohol in Madeira. Between 1895 and 1919, he held a monopoly on the manufacture of sugar and alcohol in Madeira, which led to extensive discussion in Parliament and in both the local and the national press. This regime of privilege, granted through various successive laws and decrees, gave rise to the famous "Questão Hinton" process, through which he lost his monopoly in 1919, he later acquired the São Filipe factory, returning to holding the same monopolies.

In addition to William Hinton & Sons, Hinton also inherited Fábrica do Torreão, a sugar factory founded by his grandfather Robert Wallas in 1845. In 1945, Hinton employed 680 workers at the Fábrica do Torreão and celebrated the first centenary of the establishment. The entrepreneur acquired other factories and expanded his business to different territories, namely Angola, where he lived a considerable part of his life and where he was the founder and main shareholder of the Agrícola de Cassequel company. Hinton was also linked to cattle-breeding and milk production, Madeira wine export, Car sale and repair, Madeira's banana culture, the sale of spirits and, for some years, tobacco manufacturing, through the Empresa Madeira de tobacco, founded in 1913.

A controversial figure, Hinton was the target of admiration and esteem, but also of criticism and satire, as evidenced by the caricatures published in the trimonthly satirical newspaper Re-nhau-nhau. In 1934, the Portuguese Government, in recognition of his work, decorated him with the rank of Commander of the Order of Christ and, in 1939, with that of Grand Officer of the Industrial Order of Merit. Likewise, in 1947, Hinton received the rank of officer of the Order of the British Empire from George VI.

== Charity work ==
A prominent local figure, Hinton donated large sums of money to welfare works, helping build the prevention center to assist tuberculosis patients in Santa Isabel; the Dr. João de Almada Sanatorium Hospital, founded in Funchal on 8 December 1940; and the hospital da Santa Casa da Misericórdia do Funchal, which is now known as Hospital dos Marmeleiros.

He also contributed to the reconstruction and beautification of Catholic temples, with the gift of a clock to the church of Santo António in Funchal as part of the works carried out in that space between 1922 and 1928, and the purchase and restoration of the religious cult in the Capela da Consolação, at the expense of his second wife, Isabel.

== Personal life ==
Hinton married twice, first with Henriette Wilhelmina Montgomery, and then again in Paris in 1918 with D. Isabel da Câmara e Vasconcelos do Couto Cardoso (1872–1945), who had divorced in 1917 from John Frothingham Welsh (1870–1958), and her son, George Welsh (1895–1981), ended up becoming the heir to Hinton.

In 1908, Hinton acquired the Quinta das Palmeiras, one of the largest with Madeiran farms with an area of 42.5 hectares, located in the parish of Santa Luzia, 2 km from the center of Funchal. He remodeled the house and gardens, opening an access road to Monte Railway, which is located a short distance away.

Hinton had various hobbies that were directly linked with his interest in the culture and history of Madeira, such as acquiring and collecting several literary works about the archipelago, which were transferred to the collection of the Funchal Municipal Library. Besides the bookstore, he also enriched the collection of the Funchal Municipal Museum, by offering it a sword believed to have belonged to João Gonçalves Zarco, which he had purchased from the Cossart family. His keenness for historical artifacts led him to restore, to its original design, the so-called Columbus Window, which was located in the house of João Esmeraldo (demolished in 1876), where it is thought that Christopher Columbus lived. Hinton placed the window in the Quinta das Palmeiras, a property where he received several national and foreign personalities, including D. Carlos I, King of Portugal, of whom he was a close friend, Albert I, Prince of Monaco, the Duke of Leuchtenberg, and Prince Luigi Amedeo, Duke of the Abruzzi.

== Death ==
During the Second World War, Hinton funded a British military aircraft, which he named "Palmeira" in an allusion to the Quinta das Palmeiras, where he died on 16 April 1948 at the age of 91. His funeral was held on the following day and was attended by several civil and military authorities, such as José Leite Monteiro, interim district governor, and Ernesto Honorato Ferreira, representing the Funchal City Council. His remains were taken to a British cemetery, where they were deposited in the family tomb.

As a sign of grief, several commercial and industrial establishments in Funchal kept their doors half-closed, while several football clubs in the region placed their respective flags at half-mast.

== Legacy ==
Following his death, the administrative committee of the Santa Cruz municipality (Camacha's location) decided to erect a monument to perpetuate the memory of the first football match in Portugal. Today there is a small football field in Largo da Achada in homage to the place that provided the launch pad for football in Portugal by Hinton.
