= Álvaro Milhazes =

Portuguese footballer

Personal information
- Full name: Álvaro José Novo Milhazes
- Date of birth: 26 April 1997 (age 29)
- Place of birth: Póvoa de Varzim, Portugal
- Height: 1.73 m (5 ft 8 in)
- Position: Left-back

Team information
- Current team: Varzim
- Number: 5

Youth career
- 2005–2015: Varzim
- 2015: Leixões
- 2015–2016: Paços Ferreira

Senior career*
Years	Team	Apps	(Gls)
2016–2017	Sousense	3	(0)
2017	AD Nogueirense	15	(0)
2017–2018	Salgueiros	0	(0)
2018–2019	AD Nogueirense	42	(1)
2019–2020	Sertanense	23	(2)
2020–	Varzim	28	(0)
2021	→ São João de Ver (loan)	15	(0)
2021–2022	→ Leça (loan)	23	(0)
2022–2023	→ Fafe (loan)	11	(1)
- * Club domestic league appearances and goals as of 7 May 2026

Álvaro José Novo Milhazes (born 26 April 1997) is a Portuguese professional footballer who plays as a left-back for Liga 3 club Varzim.

== Football career ==
He made his professional debut for Varzim on 8 November 2020 in the Liga Portugal 2.
