= Maria Augusta Nóbrega =

Portuguese teacher and ethnographer (1829–2007)

- Nóbrega on 18 December 2003
- Born: Maria Augusta Correia; 28 February 1929; Camacha, Madeira, Portugal
- Died: 7 February 2007 (aged 77); Camacha
- Education: Teacher training
- Known for: Ethnography of Madeira
- Awards: Order of Public Instruction of Portugal

Maria Augusta Nóbrega (1929 - 2007) was a Portuguese folklorist and researcher from the island of Madeira.

== Early life ==
Nóbrega was born in Camacha, Madeira on 28 February 1929, the daughter of Manuel Correia and Maria Baptista. She completed her primary education in Camacha, continuing her studies in Madeira's capital of Funchal, at the Colégio de Santa Teresinha. In 1955 she completed a primary school teaching course at the Escola do Magistério Primário do Funchal, and then worked as a teacher in Camacha. She went on to be the principal at several schools in that parish, retiring in 1987.

== Career as a folklorist ==
She married Álvaro João de Nóbrega in 1958, with whom she had six children: four girls and two boys. In the 1960s, she began her ethnographic activity, collecting handicrafts and everyday items from the families of her area. She later expanded her collection to include photographs, oral literature, folk poetry, local and regional clothing, personal testimonies about traditional experiences, dye plants, and everything related to ethnography, ethnology, and folklore. Her research also resulted in a collection of dolls, dressed in Madeiran and Porto Santo Island costumes, which have been exhibited numerous times, both within Portugal and abroad.

Working particularly with children, she founded the Camacha Children's Folklore Group in 1969 and the Camacha Youth Folklore Group in 1978. She was a mentor of the project to build an ethnographic village, which became an integral part of the Christmas decorations in the centre of Funchal. Her aim in doing this was to showcase the customs, festivals and traditions of her fellow citizens, many of which had been almost forgotten. After her death, the ethnographic village continued to be built by her daughter, Gilda Nóbrega. Nóbrega collaborated with several sociocultural events held in Madeira, including the Flower Festival, the Carnival procession, and the end-of-year festivities, as well as the organization of the popular apple, craft, and Holy Spirit festivals in Camacha. Between 1982 and 1995, she was part of the organizing committee for the Santa Cruz Municipality's festivals, directing the Nosso Município (Our Municipality) fair, an experience she later documented in the book Popular Festivals of Santo Amaro: Fourteen Years (1982-1995) of Participation in the Popular Festivals of Santo Amaro and the Municipality in Santa Cruz, published in 2006. In the mid-1980s, she visited Venezuela to provide training to the emigrant Madeiran folklore groups there.

She published the results of her research in Retalhos (Scraps), Poesia Popular (Popular Poetry); Tradições Madeirenses (Madeiran Traditions, in three volumes); O Traje Regional (The Regional Costume); Apostas para sua Divulgação (Bets for your Disclosure); The Magic of Wine; and The Fascination of Liqueurs, constituting, together with her work in favour of popular culture, a contribution to the preservation of Madeira's cultural memory.

== Awards and honours ==
In 1985, she was honoured by the Regional Government of Madeira and the Regional Secretariat of Tourism and Culture with a silver tray, in 1991 with a silver feather, and in 1995 with a golden starfish, in recognition of her commitment and dedication to Madeiran popular culture. In 1995, she was made an Official of the Portuguese Order of Public Instruction.

== Death ==
Nóbrega died on 7 February 2007 in Camacha, after a long illness.
