= Ribeiro dos Reis =

Portuguese footballer and journalist (1896–1961)

Personal information
- Full name: António Ribeiro dos Reis
- Date of birth: 19 July 1896
- Place of birth: Lisbon, Portugal
- Date of death: 1961 (aged 64–65)

Senior career*
Years	Team	Apps	(Gls)
1914–1925	Benfica		

International career
1921	Portugal	1	(0)

Managerial career
- 1921–1923: Portugal
- 1925–1926: Portugal
- 1926–1929: Benfica
- * Club domestic league appearances and goals

António Ribeiro dos Reis (19 July 1896 – 1961) was a Portuguese footballer and journalist.

== Career ==
=== Playing career ===
Born in Lisbon, Ribeiro dos Reis played for Benfica between 1914 and 1925. He also represented Portugal national team in 1921, and managed his nation between 1921 and 1923, and 1925 and 1926. The Taça Ribeiro dos Reis, held between 1961 and 1971, was named after him.

=== Journalism ===
Ribeiro dos Reis, along with Cândido de Oliveira, co-founded sports newspaper A Bola in 1945.
