= Liga Intercalar =

- Founded: 2007
- Folded: 2011
- Country: Portugal
- Confederation: UEFA
- Most championships: Estoril Praia (2 Titles)

The Liga Intercalar or Reserves Championship was a competition that served mainly to rotate less used players, juniors and players returning from injury. The first edition (2007–2008) was organized by the Football Association of Porto, monitored by the LPFP and Portuguese Football Federation, and was played between clubs from the AF Porto and the AF Braga. By the second edition, the competition was played on a national level, participating clubs from the North and South Zones, which included the Big Three in Portuguese football: Benfica, Porto and Sporting. Due to scheduling conflicts between the AF Lisbon and the AF Porto, the competition was split into two leagues in 2010–2011 and altogether abolished by the end of that season.

== Regulations and Structure ==
Every match was played every Wednesday afternoon, much like the older Reserve Leagues. It was organized into two leagues with two groups, the North Zone and South Zone with a Winter and Spring phase. Both winner and runners-up from both phases of both groups competed in a regional play-off after which each regional champion played in the national final.

This tournament also brought innovations. With regard to the score of the draws:

- Won = 3 points
- Drawn with goals = 2 points
- Goalless draw = 1 point
- Lost = 0 points

In the replacement rules, three substitution were allowed to be made during the game, plus two at half-time.

== Champions ==
| Season | League | Status | Winner | Score | Runner-up |
|---|---|---|---|---|---|
| 2007–08 | Liga Intercalar | North Zone | Varzim | 2–1 (aet) | Braga |
| 2008–09 | Liga Intercalar | National | FC Porto | 0–0 (aet, 6–5p) | Mafra |
| 2009–10 | Liga Intercalar | National | Estoril Praia | 2–1 | Paços de Ferreira |
| 2010–11 | Liga do Futuro | North Zone | Vitória de Guimarães | 2–1 | Ribeirão |
| 2010–11 | Liga Centenária | South Zone | Estoril Praia | 2–0 | Benfica |
