= Camacha =

- Civil parish
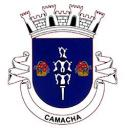
- Coat of arms
- Interactive map of Camacha
- Location in Madeira
- Coordinates: 32.679°N 16.845°W
- Country: Portugal
- Auton. region: Madeira
- Municipality: Santa Cruz

Area
  - Total: 19.77 km^{2} (7.63 sq mi)

Population (2011)
  - Total: 7,449
  - Density: 376.8/km^{2} (975.9/sq mi)
- Time zone: UTC+00:00 (WET)
  - Summer (DST): UTC+01:00 (WEST)
- Postal code: 9135

Camacha (Portuguese pronunciation: [kɐˈmaʃɐ]) is a parish in the municipality of Santa Cruz, on the southeastern part of Madeira Island. It is situated in the mountainous interior of the island, 3 km north of Caniço, 7 km northeast of Funchal and 6 km west of Santa Cruz. The population in 2011 was 7,449, in an area of 19.77 km^{2}.

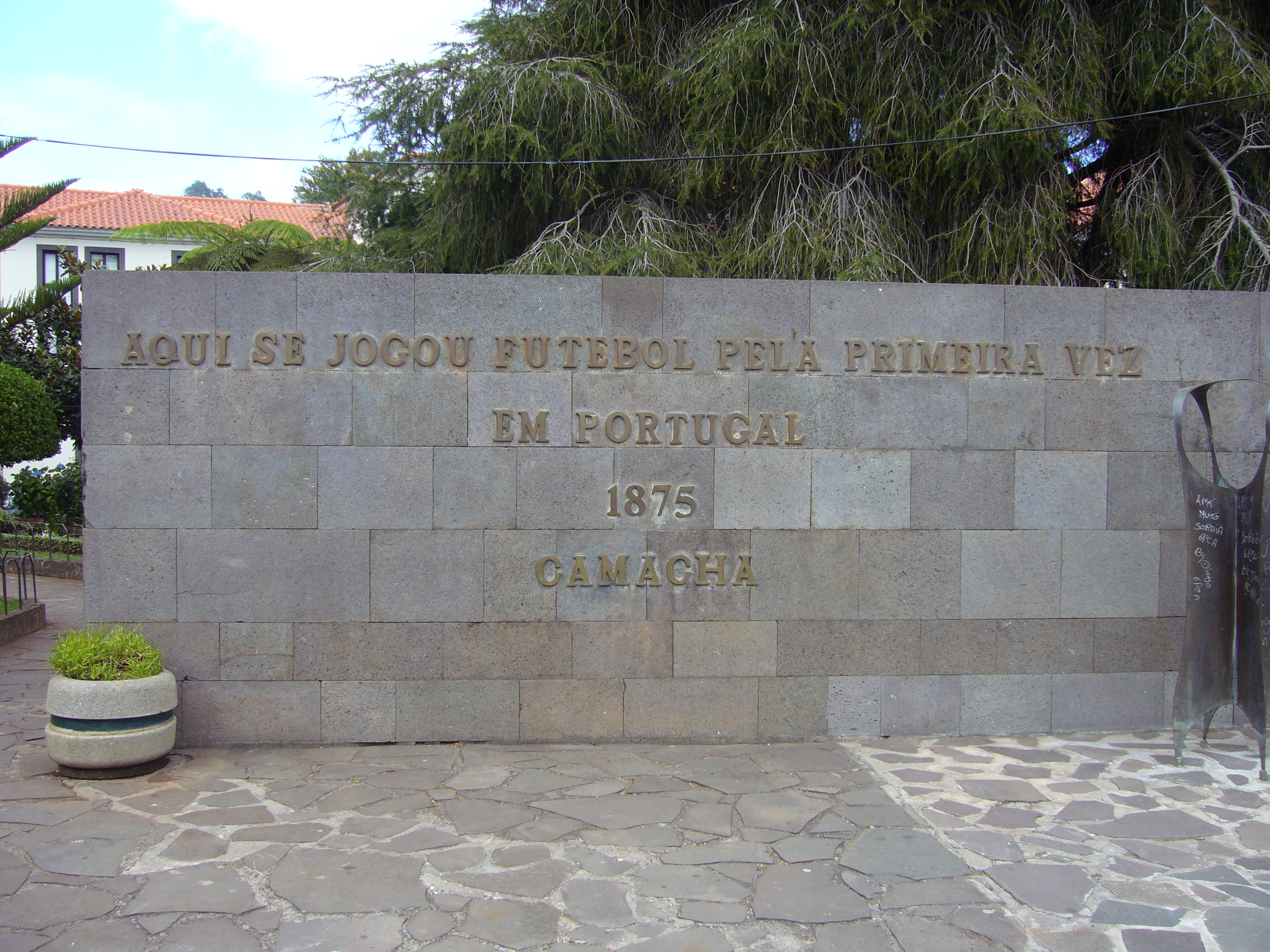
Monument in Camacha, celebrating the first ever organized football game in Portugal

The first organized game of football in Portugal took place in 1875 in Camacha, organized by the Madeira-born Harry Hinton.

== People from Camacha ==
- Maria Augusta Nóbrega (1929–2007), Madeiran folklore specialist
