= Taça Ribeiro dos Reis =

- Founded: 1961
- Folded: 1971
- Country: Portugal
- Confederation: UEFA
- Most championships: Vitória de Setúbal; Benfica (3 titles each)
- Website: www.fpf.pt

The Taça Ribeiro dos Reis (Ribeiro dos Reis Cup) was a competition organized by the Portuguese Football Federation started in the 1961–62 football season and which had its last edition on the 1970–71 season. It is named after António Ribeiro dos Reis, a former Portuguese football player, coach, journalist, and FPF director, and the first Portuguese nominated for the FIFA Refereeing Committee.

== Format ==
Teams were divided in 4 groups according to geographical proximity. Teams played against each other once in group matches. The winners of the groups advanced to one legged semi-final (one for southern teams and another for northern teams). Semi-final winners advanced to the final, semi-final losers played for the third place playoff. In the last two editions there were 7 groups and a quarter-final phase, with one team receiving a bye through the next round.

== Ribeiro dos Reis Cup finals ==
Season	Winner	Score	Runner-up	Third Place	Score	Fourth Place
1961–62	Seixal	4–2	Vila Real	Barreirense	2–1	Marinhense
1962–63	Vitória de Setúbal	2–1	Torreense	Benfica	3–1	Varzim
1963–64	Benfica	2–1	Leixões	Sporting da Covilhã	2–1	Olhanense
1964–65	Beira-Mar	3–1	Alhandra	Porto	4–2	Portimonense
1965–66	Benfica (2)	9–2	Penafiel	Marinhense	2–1	Olhanense
1966–67	Sporting de Espinho	1–0	Vitória de Setúbal	Salgueiros	3–1	Almada
1967–68	Barreirense	2–0	Leixões	Sintrense	3–2	Beira-Mar
1968–69	Vitória de Setúbal (2)	1–0	Peniche	Benfica	2–1	Salgueiros
1969–70	Vitória de Setúbal (3)	2–1	Académica de Coimbra	Salgueiros	2–1	Famalicão
1970–71	Benfica (3)	3–1	Braga	Barreirense	1–0	Académica de Coimbra

=== Performance by club ===
Club	Winners	Runners-up	Winning Years and Runner-Up Years
Vitória de Setúbal	3	1	1963, 1967, 1969, 1970
Benfica	3	-	1964, 1966, 1971
Seixal	1	-	1962
Beira-Mar	1	-	1965
Sporting de Espinho	1	-	1967
Barreirense	1	-	1968
Leixões	-	2	1964, 1968
Vila Real	-	1	1962
Torreense	-	1	1963
Alhandra	-	1	1965
Penafiel	-	1	1966
Peniche	-	1	1969
Académica de Coimbra	-	1	1970
Braga	-	1	1971

== Participating clubs ==
	Team	City	Years	First season	Last season	Titles	Runners-up	Third place	Fourth place
1	Vitória de Setúbal	Setúbal	7	1963	1971	3	1	0	0
2	Benfica	Lisbon	9	1963	1971	3	0	2	0
3	Barreirense	Barreiro	10	1962	1971	1	0	2	0
4	Beira-Mar	Aveiro	8	1963	1971	1	0	0	1
5	Sporting de Espinho	Espinho	10	1962	1971	1	0	0	0
6	Seixal	Seixal	7	1962	1971	1	0	0	0
7	Leixões	Matosinhos	8	1964	1971	0	2	0	0
8	Académica de Coimbra	Coimbra	3	1964	1971	0	1	0	1
9	Peniche	Peniche	10	1962	1971	0	1	0	0
10	Torreense	Torres Vedras	9	1963	1971	0	1	0	0
11	Braga	Braga	8	1963	1971	0	1	0	0
12	Alhandra	Alhandra	7	1962	1969	0	1	0	0
13	Penafiel	Penafiel	6	1966	1971	0	1	0	0
14	Vila Real	Vila Real	2	1962	1965	0	1	0	0
15	Salgueiros	Porto	8	1962	1971	0	0	2	1
16	Marinhense	Marinha Grande	6	1962	1971	0	0	1	1
17	Sporting da Covilhã	Covilhã	8	1962	1969	0	0	1	0
18	Sintrense	Sintra	7	1965	1971	0	0	1	0
19	FC Porto	Porto	3	1965	1970	0	0	1	0
20	Portimonense	Portimão	9	1963	1971	0	0	0	1
21	Olhanense	Olhão	7	1962	1971	0	0	0	1
22	Famalicão	Vila Nova de Famalicão	6	1964	1971	0	0	0	1
22	Varzim	Póvoa de Varzim	6	1963	1971	0	0	0	1
24	Almada	Almada	5	1965	1969	0	0	0	1
25	Atlético CP	Lisbon	9	1962	1971	0	0	0	0
25	Luso de Beja	Beja	9	1963	1971	0	0	0	0
25	Oriental	Lisbon	9	1962	1971	0	0	0	0
25	Sanjoanense	São João da Madeira	9	1962	1971	0	0	0	0
29	Leça	Matosinhos	8	1963	1970	0	0	0	0
29	Montijo	Montijo	8	1962	1971	0	0	0	0
31	Cova da Piedade	Cova da Piedade	7	1962	1968	0	0	0	0
31	Belenenses	Lisbon	7	1963	1971	0	0	0	0
31	Boavista	Porto	7	1962	1971	0	0	0	0
31	CUF Barreiro	Barreiro	7	1965	1971	0	0	0	0
31	União de Lamas	Santa Maria de Lamas	7	1965	1971	0	0	0	0
36	Oliveirense	Oliveira de Azeméis	6	1962	1967	0	0	0	0
36	Lusitano de Évora	Évora	6	1963	1970	0	0	0	0
36	Vitória de Guimarães	Guimarães	6	1966	1971	0	0	0	0
39	Académico de Viseu	Viseu	5	1963	1970	0	0	0	0
39	Farense	Faro	5	1962	1970	0	0	0	0
39	Torres Novas	Torres Novas	5	1967	1971	0	0	0	0
42	Feirense	Santa Maria da Feira	4	1963	1966	0	0	0	0
42	Os Leões	Angra do Heroísmo	4	1964	1969	0	0	0	0
42	Sporting CP	Lisbon	4	1963	1969	0	0	0	0
42	Gouveia	Gouveia	4	1968	1971	0	0	0	0
42	Sesimbra	Sesimbra	4	1968	1971	0	0	0	0
42	Tirsense	Santo Tirso	4	1967	1971	0	0	0	0
42	Tramagal	Tramagal	4	1968	1971	0	0	0	0
42	União de Tomar	Tomar	4	1966	1971	0	0	0	0
50	Lusitano VRSA	Vila Real de Santo António	3	1962	1964	0	0	0	0
50	Vianense	Viana do Castelo	3	1962	1964	0	0	0	0
50	Desportivo de Beja	Beja	3	1964	1966	0	0	0	0
50	Vizela	Vizela	3	1968	1971	0	0	0	0
54	Benfica e Castelo Branco	Castelo Branco	2	1962	1963	0	0	0	0
54	Sacavenense	Sacavém	2	1963	1964	0	0	0	0
54	Ovarense	Ovar	2	1966	1967	0	0	0	0
57	Campomaiorense	Campo Maior	1	1962	1962	0	0	0	0
57	Portalegrense	Portalegre	1	1963	1963	0	0	0	0
57	Silves	Silves	1	1963	1963	0	0	0	0
57	Lusitano de Vildemoinhos	Viseu	1	1964	1964	0	0	0	0
57	Casa Pia	Lisbon	1	1966	1966	0	0	0	0
57	União da Madeira	Funchal	1	1968	1968	0	0	0	0
57	Marítimo	Funchal	1	1969	1969	0	0	0	0
57	Valecambrense	Vale de Cambra	1	1969	1969	0	0	0	0
57	União de Santarém	Santarém	1	1970	1970	0	0	0	0
57	Nacional da Madeira	Funchal	1	1970	1970	0	0	0	0
57	Riopele	Vila Nova de Famalicão	1	1971	1971	0	0	0	0
57	União de Coimbra	Coimbra	1	1971	1971	0	0	0	0
57	União de Leiria	Leiria	1	1971	1971	0	0	0	0
