= Taça Federação Portuguesa de Futebol =

Portuguese football competition

- Organiser(s): Portuguese Football Federation
- Founded: 1976
- Abolished: 1977
- Region: Portugal
- Teams: 64

The Portuguese Football Federation Cup was a competition organized by the Portuguese Football Federation. It was only played in the 1976–77 season. There was an exclusive edition for each of the three top Portuguese divisions, resulting in three champions from different divisions.

This cup is not to be confused with the actual national cup, the Taça de Portugal, despite both being run by the PFF.

== Format ==
Each of the three top divisions had their own "Portuguese Football Federation Cup". The format was the following:

- Group Phase: Teams were split into 4 groups of 4 teams.
- Knockout Phase: Group winners face each other. Both Semi-finals and the final are one-legged fixtures.

== Taça FPF ==
=== First Division ===
==== Group Phase ====
| Clube | J | V | E | D | GM | GS | +/- | Pts |
|---|---|---|---|---|---|---|---|---|
| Braga | 6 | 4 | 1 | 1 | 13 | 2 | +11 | 9 |
| Vitória de Guimarães | 6 | 3 | 2 | 1 | 11 | 4 | +7 | 8 |
| Varzim | 6 | 3 | 1 | 2 | 7 | 7 | +0 | 7 |
| Leixões | 6 | 0 | 0 | 6 | 4 | 22 | -18 | 0 |

| Clube | J | V | E | D | GM | GS | +/- | Pts |
|---|---|---|---|---|---|---|---|---|
| Porto | 6 | 5 | 1 | 0 | 13 | 2 | +11 | 11 |
| Académico do Porto | 6 | 2 | 2 | 2 | 8 | 6 | +2 | 6 |
| Beira-Mar | 6 | 1 | 2 | 3 | 6 | 16 | -10 | 4 |
| Boavista | 6 | 0 | 0 | 3 | 6 | 9 | -3 | 3 |

| Clube | J | V | E | D | GM | GS | +/- | Pts |
|---|---|---|---|---|---|---|---|---|
| Estoril Praia | 6 | 3 | 2 | 1 | 11 | 8 | +3 | 8 |
| Benfica | 6 | 3 | 2 | 1 | 13 | 8 | +5 | 8 |
| Sporting CP | 6 | 2 | 2 | 2 | 11 | 12 | -2 | 6 |
| Belenenses | 6 | 1 | 0 | 5 | 6 | 13 | -7 | 2 |

| Clube | J | V | E | D | GM | GS | +/- | Pts |
|---|---|---|---|---|---|---|---|---|
| Atlético CP | 6 | 5 | 0 | 1 | 17 | 4 | +13 | 10 |
| Portimonense | 6 | 3 | 1 | 2 | 11 | 10 | +1 | 7 |
| Vitória de Setúbal | 6 | 3 | 1 | 2 | 11 | 10 | +1 | 7 |
| Montijo | 6 | 0 | 0 | 6 | 6 | 21 | -15 | 0 |

==== Knockout Phase ====
- SC Braga: 3 vs FC Porto: 1.
- Atlético Clube de Portugal: 1 vs Grupo Desportivo Estoril Praia: 2.

Finals:

- SC Braga: 2 vs Grupo Desportivo Estoril Praia: 0.

=== Second Division ===
==== Group Phase ====
| Clube | J | V | E | D | GM | GS | +/- | Pts |
|---|---|---|---|---|---|---|---|---|
| Famalicão | 6 | 4 | 1 | 1 | 10 | 4 | +6 | 9 |
| Fafe | 6 | 3 | 1 | 2 | 9 | 5 | +4 | 7 |
| Chaves | 6 | 2 | 1 | 3 | 8 | 8 | +0 | 5 |
| Gil Vicente | 6 | 0 | 3 | 3 | 3 | 8 | -5 | 3 |

| Clube | J | V | E | D | GM | GS | +/- | Pts |
|---|---|---|---|---|---|---|---|---|
| União de Lamas | 6 | 3 | 2 | 1 | 11 | 9 | +2 | 8 |
| Penafiel | 6 | 3 | 1 | 2 | 10 | 8 | +2 | 7 |
| Paços de Ferreira | 6 | 3 | 1 | 2 | 11 | 11 | +0 | 7 |
| Régua | 6 | 0 | 2 | 4 | 6 | 10 | -4 | 2 |

| Clube | J | V | E | D | GM | GS | +/- | Pts |
|---|---|---|---|---|---|---|---|---|
| Covilhã | 6 | 4 | 0 | 2 | 15 | 10 | +5 | 8 |
| Marinhense | 6 | 3 | 1 | 2 | 7 | 7 | +0 | 7 |
| Sanjoanense | 6 | 3 | 1 | 2 | 13 | 4 | +9 | 7 |
| Acad. Viseu | 6 | 1 | 0 | 5 | 5 | 19 | -14 | 2 |

| Clube | J | V | E | D | GM | GS | +/- | Pts |
|---|---|---|---|---|---|---|---|---|
| Portalegrense | 6 | 3 | 1 | 2 | 10 | 4 | +6 | 7 |
| Peniche | 6 | 2 | 2 | 2 | 5 | 6 | -1 | 6 |
| U. Santarém | 6 | 1 | 4 | 1 | 5 | 8 | -3 | 6 |
| U. Coimbra | 6 | 2 | 1 | 3 | 6 | 8 | -2 | 5 |

| Clube | J | V | E | D | GM | GS | +/- | Pts |
|---|---|---|---|---|---|---|---|---|
| Barreirense | 6 | 4 | 1 | 1 | 8 | 2 | +6 | 9 |
| Odivelas | 6 | 4 | 0 | 2 | 9 | 6 | +3 | 8 |
| Almada | 6 | 1 | 2 | 2 | 5 | 8 | -3 | 4* |
| Sesimbra | 6 | 0 | 1 | 4 | 2 | 8 | -6 | 1* |

| Clube | J | V | E | D | GM | GS | +/- | Pts |
|---|---|---|---|---|---|---|---|---|
| Olhanense | 6 | 4 | 1 | 1 | 11 | 9 | +2 | 9 |
| Vasco da Gama | 6 | 3 | 2 | 1 | 16 | 13 | +3 | 8 |
| Farense | 6 | 1 | 2 | 3 | 6 | 9 | -3 | 4 |
| Juv. Évora | 6 | 1 | 1 | 4 | 10 | 12 | -2 | 3 |

- The Almada-Sesimbra match was not validated by FPF.

==== Knockout Phase ====
| Clube | J | V | E | D | GM | GS | +/- | Pts |
|---|---|---|---|---|---|---|---|---|
| Famalicão | 2 | 1 | 1 | 0 | 3 | 0 | +3 | 3 |
| Covilhã | 2 | 0 | 2 | 0 | 3 | 3 | +0 | 2 |
| U. Lamas | 2 | 0 | 1 | 1 | 3 | 6 | -3 | 1 |

| Clube | J | V | E | D | GM | GS | +/- | Pts |
|---|---|---|---|---|---|---|---|---|
| Barreirense | 2 | 1 | 1 | 0 | 3 | 1 | +2 | 3 |
| Portalegrense | 2 | 1 | 0 | 1 | 2 | 2 | +0 | 2 |
| Olhanense | 2 | 0 | 1 | 1 | 1 | 3 | -2 | 1 |

==== Finals ====
Famalicão: 0 vs BARREIRENSE: 1.

=== Third Division ===
==== Group Phase ====
| Clube | J | V | E | D | GM | GS | +/- | Pts |
|---|---|---|---|---|---|---|---|---|
| Bragança | 6 | 3 | 2 | 1 | 14 | 2 | +12 | 8 |
| Monção | 6 | 3 | 0 | 3 | 10 | 16 | -4 | 6 |
| Vianense | 6 | 2 | 1 | 3 | 9 | 10 | -1 | 5 |
| D. Aves | 6 | 2 | 1 | 3 | 7 | 12 | -5 | 5 |

| Clube | J | V | E | D | GM | GS | +/- | Pts |
|---|---|---|---|---|---|---|---|---|
| Lamego | 6 | 3 | 2 | 1 | 6 | 3 | +3 | 8 |
| Avintes | 6 | 4 | 0 | 2 | 9 | 12 | -3 | 8 |
| Oliveirense | 6 | 2 | 2 | 2 | 12 | 7 | +5 | 6 |
| Paços de Brandão | 6 | 0 | 2 | 4 | 7 | 12 | -5 | 2 |

| Clube | J | V | E | D | GM | GS | +/- | Pts |
|---|---|---|---|---|---|---|---|---|
| Águeda | 6 | 4 | 1 | 1 | 8 | 3 | +5 | 9 |
| Oliveira do Bairro | 6 | 3 | 0 | 3 | 8 | 10 | -2 | 6 |
| Marialvas | 6 | 1 | 3 | 2 | 7 | 11 | -4 | 5 |
| Naval | 6 | 1 | 2 | 3 | 8 | 7 | +1 | 4 |

| Clube | J | V | E | D | GM | GS | +/- | Pts |
|---|---|---|---|---|---|---|---|---|
| Marrazes | 6 | 3 | 2 | 1 | 4 | 6 | -2 | 8 |
| Alcobaça | 6 | 2 | 3 | 1 | 6 | 4 | +2 | 7 |
| Batalha | 6 | 1 | 3 | 2 | 5 | 6 | -1 | 5 |
| Eléctrico | 6 | 2 | 0 | 4 | 8 | 7 | +1 | 4 |

| Clube | J | V | E | D | GM | GS | +/- | Pts |
|---|---|---|---|---|---|---|---|---|
| O Elvas | 6 | 4 | 0 | 2 | 10 | 6 | +4 | 8 |
| Nacional | 6 | 3 | 1 | 2 | 11 | 6 | +5 | 7 |
| SL Olivais | 6 | 3 | 1 | 2 | 9 | 9 | +0 | 7 |
| Alverca | 6 | 0 | 2 | 4 | 4 | 13 | -9 | 2 |

| Clube | J | V | E | D | GM | GS | +/- | Pts |
|---|---|---|---|---|---|---|---|---|
| Luso | 6 | 3 | 2 | 1 | 9 | 5 | +4 | 8 |
| Aljustrense | 6 | 4 | 0 | 2 | 11 | 8 | +3 | 8 |
| Santiago do Cacém | 6 | 1 | 2 | 3 | 7 | 8 | -1 | 4 |
| Silves | 6 | 1 | 2 | 3 | 6 | 12 | -6 | 4 |

==== Second Phase ====
Bragança: 3 Águeda: 0. Lamego desqualificado.

| Clube | J | V | E | D | GM | GS | +/- | Pts |
|---|---|---|---|---|---|---|---|---|
| O Elvas | 2 | 1 | 0 | 1 | 3 | 2 | +1 | 2 |
| Luso | 2 | 1 | 0 | 1 | 2 | 2 | +0 | 2 |
| Marrazes | 2 | 1 | 0 | 1 | 2 | 3 | -1 | 2 |

==== Final ====
GD BRAGANÇA: 1 Elvas: 0.

== Champions Table ==
| Season | Champions |
| Season | 1ª Division | 2ª Division | 3ª Division |
|---|---|---|---|
| 1976–77 | SC Braga | FC Barreirense | G.D. Bragança |
