= Varzim S.C. =

Portuguese football club

Varzim
- Full name: Varzim Sport Club
- Nicknames: Lobos do Mar (Sea Wolves); Alvi-Negros (White and Blacks); Poveiros (those from Póvoa de Varzim); Raça Poveira (Povoan Race)
- Founded: 25 December 1915
- Ground: Estádio do Varzim Sport Club, Póvoa de Varzim
- Capacity: 7,280
- Chairman: Edgar Pinho
- Manager: Carlos Fernandes
- League: Liga 3
- 2023–24: Liga 3, 6th of 8 (promotion stage)
- Website: www.varzim.pt
Home colours	Away colours

Varzim Sport Club (Portuguese pronunciation: [vɐɾˈzĩ sɨˈpɔɾ ˈkluβɨ]) is a Portuguese football club based in Póvoa de Varzim. The club was founded on 25 December 1915, and has played at the Estádio do Varzim Sport Club since its foundation. The club plays in Liga 3, following relegation in the 2021–22 Liga Portugal 2. The club has played for a total of 21 seasons at the top level of Portuguese football, eight seasons in a row from 1963. It has reached the semi-finals of the Taça de Portugal on three occasions, in 1978, 1980 and 1985.

Varzim has won six major titles in its history, which include the Segunda Divisão four times and the Terceira Divisão and Liga Intercalar once. The club usually plays with over 70% of players from its youth ranks. The club youth academy is notable for producing Portuguese international footballers like António Lima Pereira, Bruno Alves, Hélder Postiga and Salvador Agra.

== History ==
The club was founded on 25 December 1915 under the name Varzim Foot-Ball Club. On 25 March 1916, the club approved a motion to change its name to Varzim Sport Club. Following the name change, black and white were chosen as the colours for the club's kits in all sports. In 1918, the club joined the Porto Football Association, where it officially became recognised as a club and started to compete in the city's football league. In 1920, the club won its first trophy, the Taça Eça de Queiroz.

Following several seasons playing in the amateur leagues, the club gained promotion to the top-flight Primeira Liga in 1963, where it remained for 13 seasons before being relegated. Since then, the club has suffered mixed results after several promotions and relegations. In the club's most recent history, it suffered relegation in the 2010–11 Liga de Honra to the non-professional leagues for the first time in 15 years.

Varzim won the Segunda Divisão in the 2011–12 season. It started its campaign in the II Divisão Zona Norte 2011–12, where it won the league comprehensively with 68 points, 14 more than the second-placed Fafe. In topping the group, the club qualified for the playoffs where two of the three sides would be promoted to the Liga de Honra. It fought off competition from Tondela and Fátima to finish top of the group and claim its fourth Segunda Divisão title. Midfielder André André was praised for his displays for the club in which he scored 12 goals in 33 appearances during the season.

Varzim did not compete in the 2012–13 Segunda Liga season as they did not pay the €600,000 registration fee. They remained in the third tier until earning promotion in June 2015 with a 3–1 aggregate play-off win over Casa Pia. Varzim remained in the second division until May 2022, when they were relegated in second-last above Académica de Coimbra.

== Honours ==
- Segunda Divisão
  - Winners (4): 1962–63, 1975–76, 1995–96, 2011–12
- Terceira Divisão
  - Winners (1): 1961–62
- Liga Intercalar
  - Winners (1): 2007–08

== Players ==
=== Current squad ===
As of 20 September 2026

Note: Flags indicate national team as defined under FIFA eligibility rules; some limited exceptions apply. Players may hold more than one non-FIFA nationality.

No.	Pos.	Nation	Player
2	DF	BRA	Renan Silva
3	DF	POR	Pedro Nuno
4	DF	BRA	Kauã Vinicius (on loan from Académico de Viseu)
5	DF	POR	Álvaro Milhazes
6	MF	BRA	David Peres
7	FW	POR	Pedro Matos
8	MF	POR	Rúben Oliveira
9	FW	POR	Rodrigo Pereira
10	MF	CPV	Marcelo Cunha
11	FW	POR	Dani Benchi
13	FW	POR	Jordão Cardoso
17	DF	POR	Luís Oliveira

No.	Pos.	Nation	Player
18	DF	POR	Stitch
19	DF	POR	André Guedes
25	FW	POR	João Couto
26	DF	POR	Rúben Fernandes
27	MF	POR	Boloto
28	GK	BRA	Gustavo Ramalho
44	DF	POR	Miguel Vila Cova
49	GK	POR	Pedro Costa
51	GK	SEN	Momo Mbaye
55	MF	POR	Diogo Rebelo
95	FW	POR	Tim
99	FW	POR	Francisco Silva

== Notable players ==
- (Portugal) António André

== Managerial history ==
- (Portugal) José Maria Pedroto (1965–1966)
- (Portugal) José Torres (1982–1984)
- (Portugal) Félix Mourinho (1984–1985)
- (Portugal) Henrique Calisto (1985–1988)
- (Portugal) António Fidalgo (1988–1989)
- (Portugal) Manuel de Oliveira (1989–1990)
- (Portugal) Henrique Calisto (1990)
- (Portugal) Eurico Gomes (1990–1991)
- (Portugal) Ruben Cunha (1991)
- (Portugal) Bernardino Pedroto (1991–1992)
- (Portugal) Álvaro Carolino (1992)
- (Portugal) Ruben Cunha (1992–1993)
- (Portugal) Nicolau Vaqueiro (1993–1994)
- (Portugal) Horácio Gonçalves (1994–1998)
- (Portugal) José Alberto Torres (1998–1999)
- (Portugal) Rogério Gonçalves (1999–2002)
- (Portugal) José Alberto Costa (2002)
- (Portugal) Luís Campos (2002–2003)
- (Portugal) Rogério Gonçalves (2003–2004)
- (Portugal) Abílio Novais (2004)
- (Portugal) José Dinis (2004–2005)
- (Portugal) Horácio Gonçalves (2005–2006)
- (Portugal) Eduardo Esteves (2006–2007)
- (Portugal) Diamantino Miranda (2007–2008)
- (Portugal) Rui Dias (2008)
- (Portugal) Eduardo Esteves (2008–2011)
- (Portugal) Dito (2011–2012)
- (Portugal) Octávio Moreira (2012)
- (Portugal) José Augusto (2012–2014)
- (Portugal) Alexandre Vila Cova (2014)
- (Portugal) Vítor Paneira (2014–2015)
- (Portugal) Quim Berto (2015)
- (Portugal) Nuno Capucho (2015–2016)
- (Portugal) Armando Evangelista (2016)
- (Portugal) Joao Eusébio (2016–2017)
- (Portugal) Nuno Capucho (2017–2018)
- (Portugal) Fernando Valente (2018–2019)
- (Portugal) César Peixoto (2019)
- (Portugal) Paulo Alves (2019–2020)
- (Portugal) Miguel Leal (2020–2023)
- (Portugal) Vitor Paneira (2023–)

== Chairmen ==
- (Portugal) Dr. José Sá (1930–1935)
- (Portugal) João Baptista (1935–1937)
- (Portugal) Manuel Frasco (1937–1940)
- (Portugal) Dr. Armindo Graça (1940–1947)
- (Portugal) Manuel Dias (1947–1951)
- (Portugal) Luís Rodrigues (1951–1953)
- (Portugal) Domingos Barbosa (1953–1954)
- (Portugal) Manuel Frasco (1954–1955)
- (Portugal) Dr. Armindo Graça (1955–1956)
- (Portugal) Alípio Oliveira (1956–1958)
- (Portugal) Capitão Amílcar Monteiro (1958–1959)
- (Peru) António Duarte (1959–1960)
- (Portugal) Dr. João Guerreiro (1960–1964)
- (Portugal) Dr. Armando Faria (1964–1965)
- (Portugal) Alípio Oliveira (1965–1966)
- (Portugal) Dr. Armando Faria (1966–1967)
- (Portugal) Fernando Castro (1967–1968)
- (Portugal) Eng.º António Castro (1968–1969)
- (Portugal) Dr. João Fernando (1969–1970)
- (Portugal) Manuel Pereira (1970–1971)
- (Portugal) Dr. Armindo Graça (1971–1972)
- (Portugal) Dr. João Fernando (1972–1974)
- (Portugal) Padre Manuel Silva (1974–1978)
- (Portugal) Dr. Rui Azevedo (1978–1979)
- (Portugal) Francisco Troina (1979–1982)
- (Portugal) Lídio Marques (1982–1988)
- (Portugal) Domingos Castro (1988–1990)
- (Portugal) Avelino Monte (1990–1992)
- (Portugal) Dr. João Fernando (1992–1994)
- (Portugal) Lídio Marques (1994–2000)
- (Portugal) João Oliveira (2000–2004)
- (Portugal) José Castro (2004–2012)

== League and Cup history ==
Season		Pos.	Pl.	W	D	L	GS	GA	P	Cup	League Cup	Notes
1963–64	1D	10	26	8	4	14	37	57	20			
1964–65	1D	11	26	8	4	14	39	55	20			
1965–66	1D	8	26	9	7	10	40	38	25			
1966–67	1D	10	26	8	6	12	29	42	22			
1967–68	1D	12	26	7	3	16	27	50	17			
1968–69	1D	9	26	7	8	11	32	49	22			
1969–70	1D	6	26	10	8	8	31	26	28			
1970–71	1D	14	26	7	4	15	23	52	18			Relegated
1976–77	1D	7	30	10	11	9	36	36	31			
1977–78	1D	10	30	9	7	14	26	38	25			
1978–79	1D	5	30	11	10	9	30	29	32			
1979–80	1D	10	30	8	10	12	37	45	26			
1980–81	1D	14	30	8	8	14	27	31	24			
1981–82	2DN	1	30	17	8	5	59	18	41			Promoted
1982–83	1D	12	30	8	10	12	23	39	26			
1983–84	1D	8	30	10	9	11	32	39	29			
1984–85	1D	15	30	2	13	15	23	49	17			Relegated
1985–86	2DN	?	?	?	?	?	?	?	?			Promoted
1986–87	1D	7	30	8	13	9	24	29	29			
1987–88	1D	17	38	7	16	15	31	52	30			Relegated
1990–91	2H	16	38	10	13	15	42	39	33	Round 5		Relegated
1995–96	2DS	1	34	20	10	4	55	25	70	Round 4		Promoted
1996–97	2H	2	34	18	5	11	49	52	59	Round 5		Promoted
1997–98	1D	17	34	6	11	17	26	51	29	Round 5		Relegated
1998–99	2H	8	34	13	9	12	51	46	48	Round 3		
1999–2000	2H	4	34	17	9	8	53	33	60	Round 4		
2000–01	2H	2	34	19	7	8	53	34	64	Round 5		Promoted
2001–02	1D	15	34	8	8	18	27	55	32	Round 4		
2002–03	1D	16	34	10	6	18	38	51	36	Quarter-finals		Relegated
2003–04	2H	4	34	16	10	8	44	36	58	Round 4		
2004–05	2H	10	34	11	10	13	37	42	43	Round 3		
2005–06	2H	4	34	13	13	8	47	39	52	Round 4		
2006–07	2H	7	30	12	8	10	34	37	44	Quarter-finals		
2007–08	2H	9	30	9	11	10	29	27	38	Round 3	Round 1	
2008–09	2H	8	30	11	6	13	29	35	39	Round 4	Round 1	
2009–10	2H	13	30	6	13	11	25	38	31	Round 3	Round 1	
2010–11	2H	15	30	6	13	11	38	47	31	Round 5	First Group Stage	Relegated
2011–12	2DS	1	30	20	8	2	48	12	68	Round 1		
2012–13	2DS	8	30	8	16	6	31	25	40	Round 3		
2013–14	CN	4	32	13	8	11	40	36	47	Round 3		
2014–15	CN	3	32	21	6	5	59	23	69	Round 4		Promoted
