= First football match in Portugal =

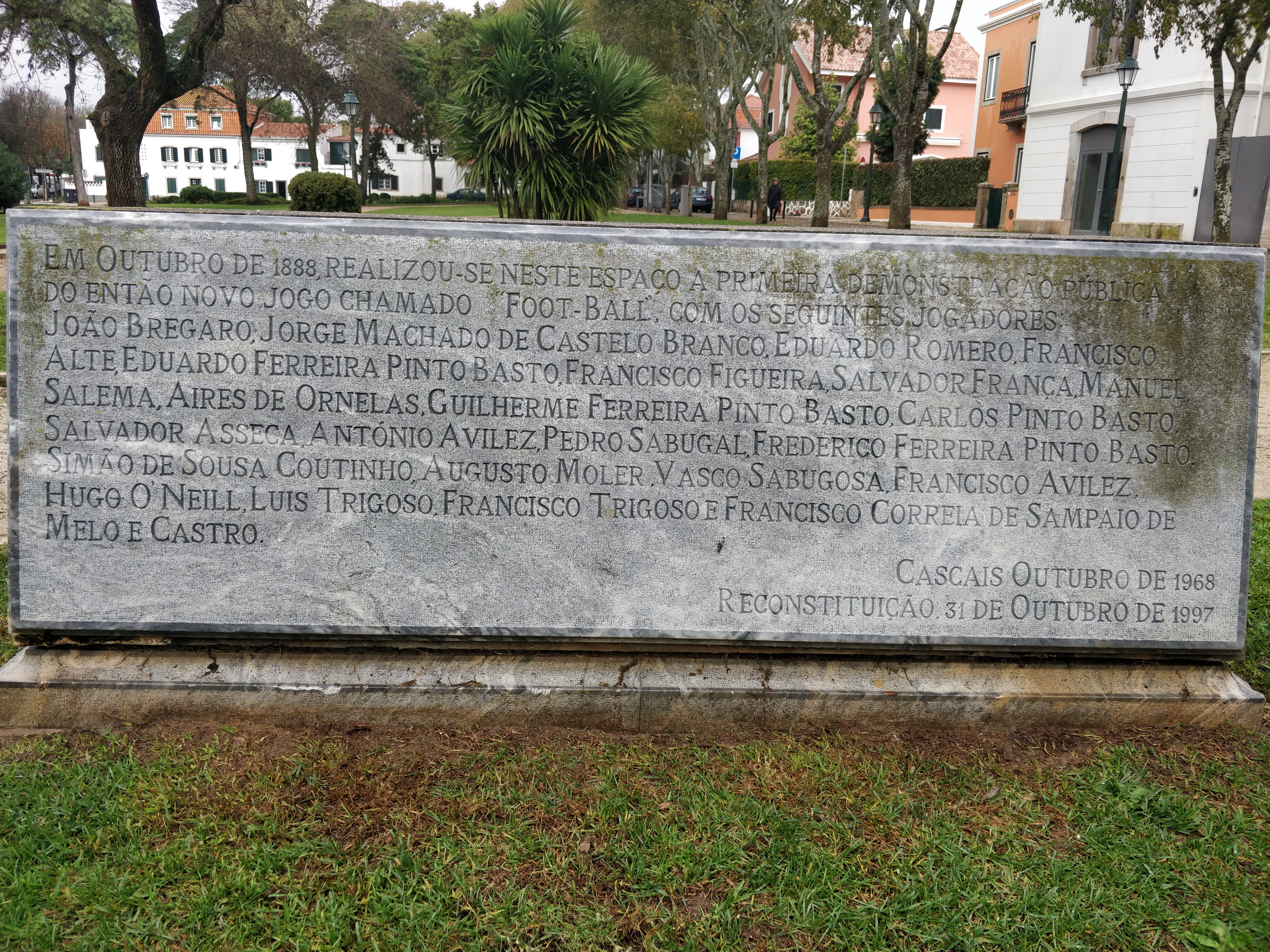
- A memorial to the first football match played on mainland Portugal in Cascais in October 1888
- Event: First football match in mainland Portugal
Portuguese	British
(Portugal)	(United Kingdom)
2	1
- Date: 22 January 1889
- Venue: Campo Pequeno, Lisbon
- Attendance: 300

The first football match in mainland Portugal took place in Campo Pequeno, Lisbon on 22 January 1889. Three months earlier, in October 1888, a test match had already been held in Cascais contested between members of the Sporting Club of Cascais, one of the first clubs dedicated to football in Portugal. However, the one held in January was the first proper match in Portuguese football history, since the pitch had markings and goalposts, and the match followed the rules and lasted 90 minutes. It was also more competitive because the match was contested between Portuguese noblemen and a group of English workers living in Portugal, and thus it can be considered as one of the first ‘international’ matches in the history of the sport. Furthermore, the one held in January was a public event, and Lisbon's high society turned out in force to see what the game was like. Both games were held at the initiative of Guilherme Pinto Basto, one of the members of Cascais club.

Among the figures who played in the test match, there was a count, viscounts, other prominent members of Lisbon's high society, and several members of the Cascais Club, including four members of the Pinto Basto family, such as Guilherme and his two brothers, Eduardo and Frederico, who had brought balls back from England, where they were studying. The best players from the first exhibition game made up a selection of the Portuguese team that played against the British at the Campo Pequeno. Consequently, football started attracting the attention of high society, distinguished by the Luso-British rivalry.

== Background ==
Portugal was introduced to football in the late 19th century by a combination of British immigrant workers, visiting sailors and Portuguese students returning from Britain. Lisbon, a city open to the world through the sea, kept a close trade and industrial relations with Britain at the end of the 19th century, thus being the home to an important British colony that also played football, a British phenomenon that was taking its first steps in Europe.

The first notable entity dedicated to, among other sports, football, was the Sporting Club of Cascais founded in 1879, which was a club for the elite, patronized by King Luis and King Carlos and by those who could afford to be close to the Royal Family, among which the Pinto Basto family stand out. The Pinto Basto brothers (Guilherme, Eduardo and Frederico) were introduced to football while studying in England at St George's College and Eduardo played a decisive role in the spread of football in mainland Portugal when he ordered a series of footballs from England, which he distributed to various military units, thus giving a huge boost to the practice of this sport.

== Test/exhibition match ==
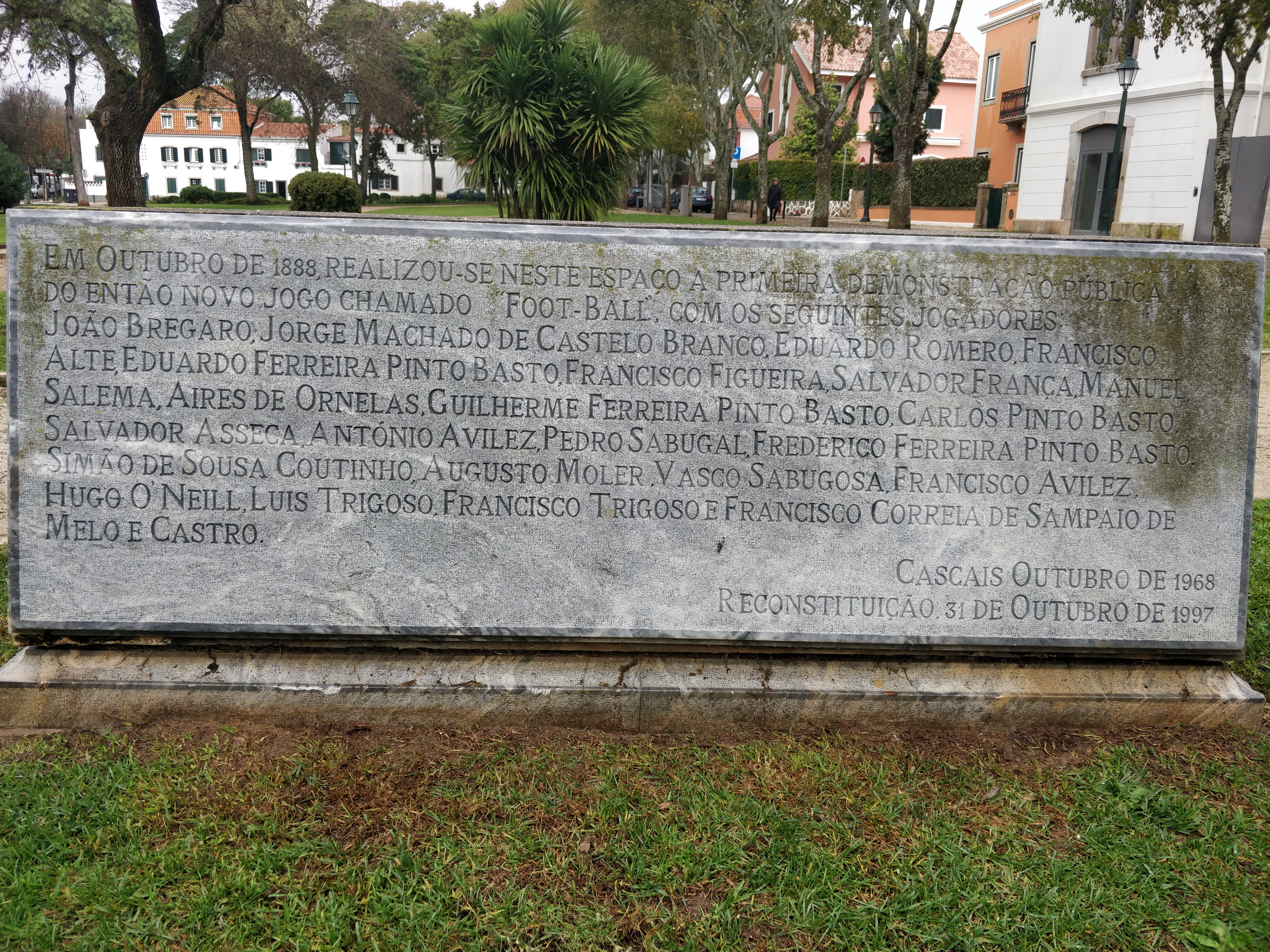
A memorial to the first football match played on mainland Portugal in Cascais in October 1888

In October 1888, Guilherme organized an exhibition match in Cascais, considered to be the first football match on mainland Portugal. It was held at the Parada de Cascais, the former Parade grounds of the Cascais Citadel, situated next to the Sporting Club (now the Museum of the Sea). Instead of their usual tennis games at dawn, they spent most of that Sunday morning removing stones from the field.

Pinto Basto himself, years later, said that this first contact with the ball was nothing more than a "rehearsal" where 28 nobles got to know the game of football. Among the figures who played that day, there was a count, viscounts, other prominent members of Lisbon's high society, and four members of the Pinto Basto family. More specifically, some of the nobles were the councilor Aires de Ornelas, Francisco Alte, Hugo O'Neil, the Viscount of Asseca, the Marquis of Borba, the Count of S. Lourenço, and Francisco Figueira. Notably, Aires de Ornelas had been an army officer, and after heroic campaigns in Africa he was a minister in several governments of the Portuguese monarchy.

== Proper match ==
=== Squad ===
On the afternoon of 22 January 1889, a few months after the "rehearsal" in Cascais, Guilherme Pinto Basto organized a more serious and competitive match in Lisbon between the Portuguese noblemen and a group of English workers living in Lisbon, thus it can be considered one of the first ‘international’ matches in the history of the sport. The English team was made up of employees of Cabo Submarino, Casa Graham, and other English houses installed in Lisbon; while the Portuguese team was made up of the best players from the test match in Cascais, which was played by 28 aristocrats. From that group, Guilherme selected himself as the goalkeeper, along with his two brothers (Eduardo and Frederico), two cousins (João Saldanha and Fernando), the Vilar brothers (Afonso and Henrique), D. Simão de Sousa Coutinho (Borba), Augusto Moller, and three more for a total of twelve players, although in the end, Guilherme ended up being a substitute. The English squad had one unidentified element and, among others, a certain F. Palmer, who notably appears in the line-up of Club Lisbonense in the 1894 Taça D. Carlos I, which means that he kept playing football with the Pinto Basto brothers for the next few years.

Regarding the equipment, the Portuguese wore clothes for all tastes, some even wearing shoes to play. There were those wearing striped bathing suits, others in convict clothing wearing shoes instead of boots, and almost all of them wearing "a peculiar hat reminiscent of an ice cream seller wandering the beaches". The English were more uniform in dress.

=== Overview ===
The game took place on a slightly windy afternoon on 22 January 1889, held where today's Campo Pequeno bullring is located, a venue that was the opposite of the relaxed and familiar setting built by those 28 aristocrats on the grounds of Parada. Unlike in Cascais, this time they played with markings and goalposts, with the players themselves arriving early to paint the lines of the field and carry the goalposts on their shoulders to fix them on the ground to be able to play the game properly. Also unlike in Cascais, this time it was a public event with free admission and there were around 300 spectators, mostly curious members of Lisbon's high society, but also some city residents and friends of the town's football players.

There were still no fixed positions, except for the goalkeeper, and game tactics did not seem to have existed, so the strategy adopted by the Portuguese was just to simply kick the ball forward in an attempt to introduce it into the opponent's goal. There is evidence that the most advanced English used tactic systems over the Portuguese's pure "kicking" chaos, and yet, they still lost the match, although it is not known by how many or who were the authors of these historic goals. However, it has been widely believed throughout the years that the result was 2–1.

== Final details ==
22 January 1889
15:15

Portuguese (Portugal)	2–1	(United Kingdom) British
?	Report	?

Campo Pequeno, Lisbon
Attendance: 300

GK	1	(Portugal) João Saldanha Pinto Basto
DF	2	(Portugal) João Bregaro
DF	3	(Portugal) Augusto Moller
MF	4	(Portugal) Eduardo Romero
MF	5	(Portugal) Eduardo Pinto Coelho
MF	6	(Portugal) Eduardo Pinto Basto (Cap)
FW	7	(Portugal) Fernando Pinto Basto
FW	8	(Portugal) Frederico Pinto Basto
FW	9	(Portugal) Henrique Vilar
FW	10	(Portugal) Afonso Vilar
FW	11	(Portugal) Simão de Sousa Coutinho

GK	1	(England) J. Frazer
DF	2	(England) J. Mason
DF	3	(England) C. Anderson
MF	4	(England) Wray
MF	5	(England) R. W. Watson
MF	6	(England) Rawstron
FW	7	(England) Govan
FW	8	(England) Briggs
FW	9	(England) F. Palmer
FW	10	(England) C. Cox
FW	11	(England) ?

== Legacy ==
After the match, almost everyone went for a walk to the Zoo, where the Persian Mirra, the hairy woman, was on display.

On the following day, the first chronicle of the dispute of a football match in Portugal was published in Jornal do Comércio, titled O "Match" no Campo Pequeno accompanied by an illustration of Julião Machado, which goes as follows: "A huge number of people went to Campo Pequeno today to watch the match of football between the English and Portuguese. [...] The result of the game was very flattering for our compatriots who managed to win. There was no lack of tumbles and rolls from the game itself, showing all the strong young men who took part in it, how expert they were in “managing” the kick, as an elegant woman who, by chance, happened to be next to us said".

The taste for football gradually spread, especially among the elites, and quickly even King D. Carlos became a fan. Football started attracting the attention of high society, distinguished by the Luso-British rivalry. The British brought maturity to Portuguese football, which was still in its infancy. When the Pinto Basto brothers founded Club Lisbonense in 1892, one of the first football clubs in Portugal, they played their first games also against Englishmen. These ones worked at the Cable & Wireless station at Carcavelos, who would eventually organize themselves into a Club, the Carcavelos Club. With the expansion of the club scene across the country, the modality began to chain itself to environments of greater competitiveness and interest with the dispute of the first competitions at club level, such as the 1894 Taça D. Carlos I, contested by Club Lisbonense and Oporto Cricket and Lawn Tennis Club, ending in a win to the former, who fielded Guilherme and Eduardo Pinto Basto and F. Palmer.

== See also ==
- First football match in Spain
- First football match in Sweden
- Football in Portugal
