= Frederico Pinto Basto =

Pioneer of football in Portugal

- Born: Frederico Tomás Ferreira Pinto Basto; 19 July 1872; Lisbon, Portugal
- Died: 22 February 1939 (aged 66); Lisbon
- Occupation: Footballer
- Known for: Introducing association football to Portugal; sports administration

Frederico Tomás Ferreira Pinto Basto (19 July 1872 – 22 February 1939) was a Portuguese football pioneer who is regarded as one of the most important figures in the amateur beginnings of football in Portugal. He is best known for playing in the first football match in mainland Portugal in Cascais in October 1888, and for then playing for a Portuguese team on 22 January 1889, against a team made-up British in Lisbon. Together with his brothers Guilherme and Eduardo, he was the fundamental head behind the foundations of some of the earliest clubs in the city such as Club Lisbonense (1892) and Club Internacional de Foot-ball (1902), serving both teams as a forward. He was also the owner of Casa das Gaeiras.

== Biography ==
In his youth, together with his brothers Guilherme and Eduardo, his main hobby was playing a sport practically unknown at the time in Portugal called football. They had been introduced to football while studying in England at St George's College, certainly played it in their College, and according to the chronicles, it was Frederico and Eduardo who in 1886 who brought the first ball of football from England.

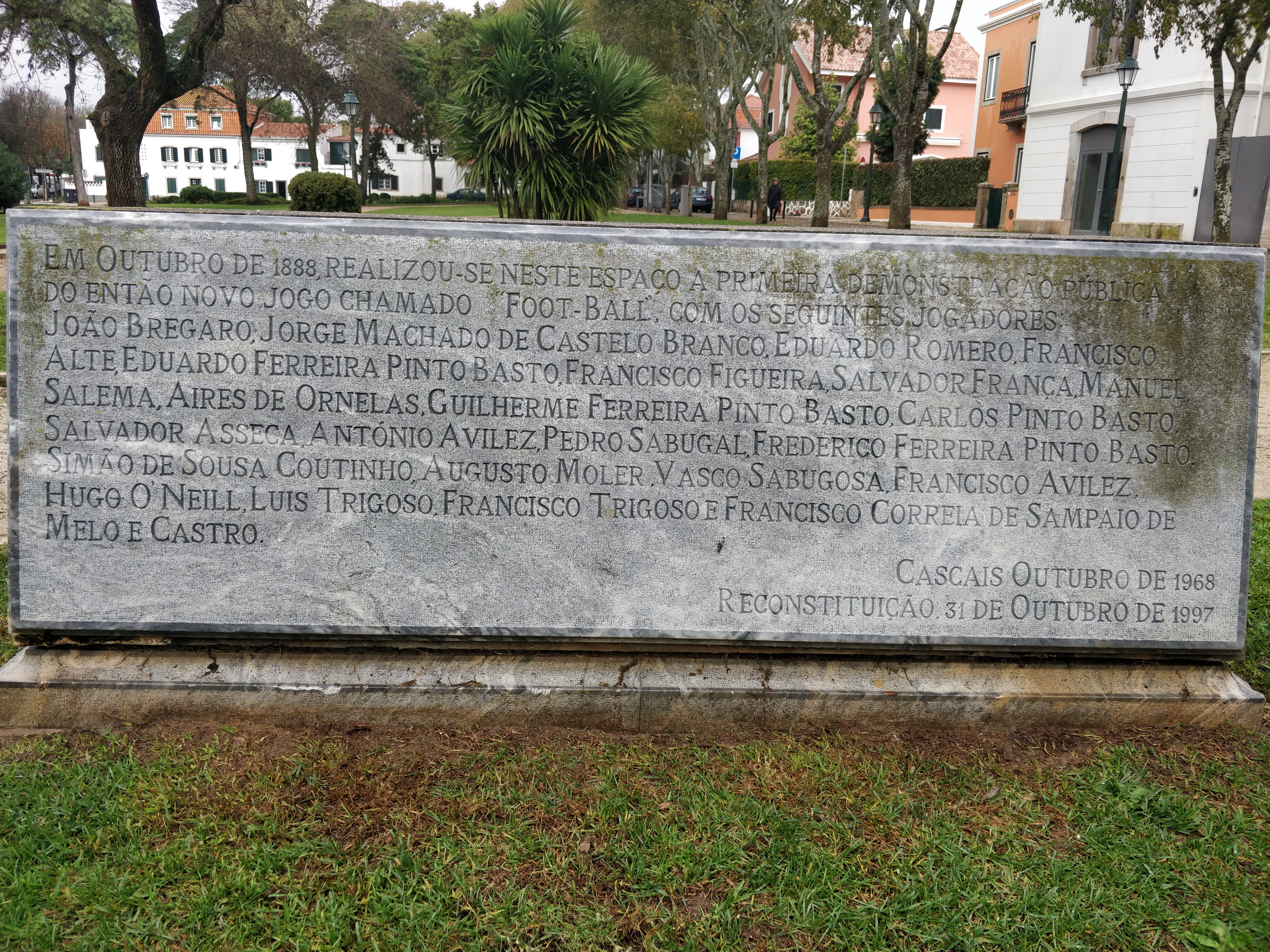
A memorial to the first football match played on mainland Portugal in Cascais in October 1888. The name "Frederico Ferreira Pinto Basto" can be seen in the sixth line.

In October 1888, his brother Guilherme organized what is now considered to be the first football match on mainland Portugal in Cascais, which was contested between members of the Sporting Club of Cascais, which was a very elite club, patronized by King Luis and King Carlos and by those who could afford to be close to the Royal Family, including the Pinto Basto family. Players included a count, viscounts, other prominent members of Lisbon's high society, and four members of the Pinto Basto family, including the 16-year-old Frederico and his two brothers. They reportedly spent the morning of the game removing stones from the field.

On the afternoon of 22 January 1889, a few months after the "rehearsal" in Cascais, his brother Guilherme organizes a more serious and competitive match between the Portuguese noblemen and a group of English workers living in Lisboa. The Portuguese team was made up of the best players from the 1888 game, and Frederico was one of them, thus playing in the first proper football match in Portugal, held where today's Campo Pequeno bullring is located. The position he played is unknown, but he helped his team to a 2–1 win over the much more advanced Englishmen.

The first football club to have been founded in Portugal was Club Lisbonense in 1892, which was founded by the Pinto Basto brothers together with other football pioneers in the city such as the Vilar brothers (Carlos and Afonso) and Paiva Raposo. Club Lisbonense played its first games against the English who worked at the Cable & Wireless cable station at Carcavelos, who would eventually organize themselves into a Club, the Carcavelos Club. The three Pinto Basto brothers then played for a football team known as the Club Tauromático Group, which also had the likes of Hugo O'Neil, who had played in the 1888 game in Cascais. At the end of January 1893, however, the Group of Club Tauromático becomes the Grupo dos Irmãos Pinto Basto (English: Pinto Basto Brothers Group).

The failed attempts to reorganize Club Lisbonense and Grupo Estrela (1893) paved the way for Eduardo, together with his brothers, to found the Club Internacional de Foot-ball (CIF) on 8 December 1902, which was the natural extension of the Grupo dos Irmãos Pinto Basto and the Foot-Ball Club Swits and which brought together players from Club Lisbonense and other clubs. CIF was the first Portuguese club to play abroad, defeating Madrid Fútbol Clube in 1907 in Madrid. CIF also briefly functioned as an association, organizing the first leagues in the country.

== Later life ==
He married Emilia Garrido Pinheiro, heiress and owner of the so-called Casa das Gaeiras and he set up home in this village in the municipality of Óbidos. He had three children, Maria Amália, Maria Eugénia and Antonio.
