= Eduardo Pinto Basto =

Pioneer of football in Portugal

- Born: Eduardo Ferreira Pinto Basto; 5 July 1869; Lisbon, Portugal
- Died: Unknown; Lisbon
- Occupation: Footballer
- Known for: Introducing association football to Portugal; sports administration

Eduardo Pinto Basto (5 July 1869 – Unknown) was a Portuguese football pioneer who is regarded as one of the most important figures in the amateur beginnings of football in Portugal. He had a pivotal and prominent role in promoting this sport in Portugal and particularly in Lisbon when he ordered a series of footballs from England, which he distributed to various military units, thus giving a huge boost to the practice of this sport. Together with his brothers Guilherme and Frederico, he was the fundamental head behind the foundations of some of the earliest clubs in the city such as Club Lisbonense (1892) and Club Internacional de Foot-ball (1902), serving both teams as a forward. The dates of his birth and death are unknown.

== Biography ==
From around 1870, the Portuguese Royal family began to spend part of the summer in the coastal town of Cascais. Aristocrats, and others who hoped to be close to the King, soon followed, including the Pinto Basto family. The Sporting Club of Cascais was founded in 1879 and counted the Royal Family and the Pinto Basto family amongst its members. At first, the Cascais multi-sports club had no football in its ranks, but the three Pinto Basto brothers (Guilherme, Eduardo and Frederico) soon changed that, being the fundamental heads behind its spread in mainland Portugal. They had been introduced to football while studying in England at St George's College and it was Eduardo who played a decisive role in the development of football in Portugal and particularly in Lisbon when he ordered a series of footballs from England, which he distributed to various military units, thus giving a huge boost to the practice of this sport.

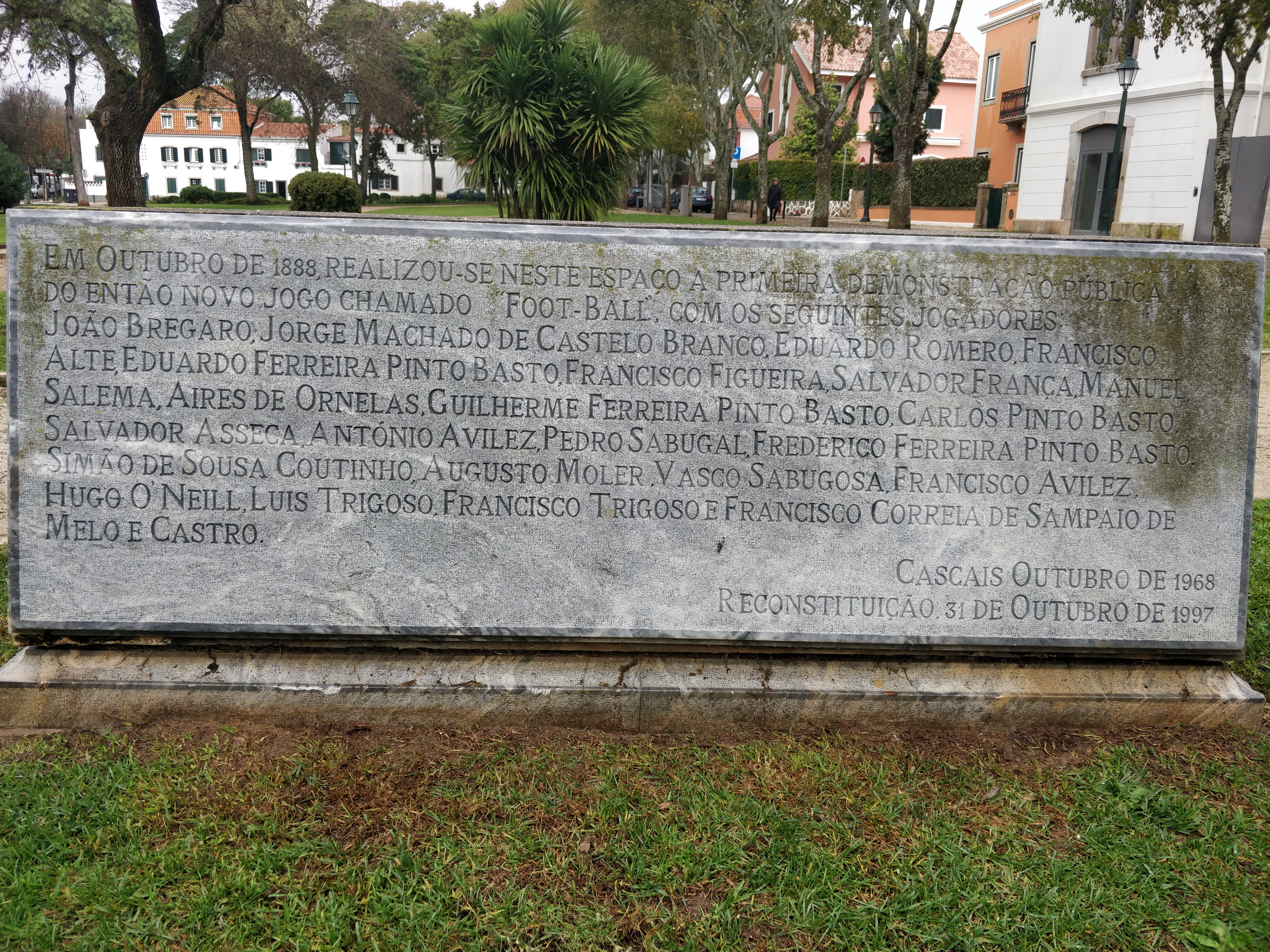
A memorial to the first football match played on mainland Portugal in Cascais in October 1888

On the other hand, his brother Guilherme organized what is now considered to be the playing in the first match on mainland Portugal in Cascais in October 1888. Players included a count, viscounts, other prominent members of Lisbon's high society, and four members of the Pinto Basto family, including Eduardo and his two brothers. They reportedly spent the morning of the game removing stones from the field.

The first football club to have been founded in Portugal was Club Lisbonense in 1892, which was founded by the Pinto Basto brothers together with other football pioneers in the city such as the Vilar brothers (Carlos and Afonso) and Paiva Raposo. Club Lisbonense played its first games against the English who worked at the Cable & Wireless cable station at Carcavelos, who would eventually organize themselves into a Club, the Carcavelos Club. In 1894 Eduardo went down in history as one of the 22 footballers who played in the very first inter-city match in the country when Lisbonense, with seven English players, traveled to Porto to face the recently created FC Porto on 2 March 1894. They played for the Taça D. Carlos I, a cup named in honour of the donor of the trophy, King Carlos, who attended the match after being convinced to do so by his brother Guilherme. The patronage and sponsorship of the King were pivotal to attract a significant number of spectators, as football was practically an unknown sport in Portugal at the time. The match was thus the first major football event in Portugal and Lisbonense won 1–0, thus receiving the very first cup awarded in Portuguese football.

The three Pinto Basto brothers then played for a football team known as the Club Tauromático Group, which also had the likes of Hugo O'Neil, who had played in the 1888 game in Cascais. At the end of January 1893, however, the Group of Club Tauromático becomes the Grupo dos Irmãos Pinto Basto (English: Pinto Basto Brothers Group). Moreover, the Pinto Basto brothers, in addition to being part of and playing for several clubs already, had their own group, the "Foot-Ball Club Swifts", where Guilherme was the captain and his brother Eduardo was the sub-captain.

The failed attempts to reorganize Club Lisbonense and Grupo Estrela (1893) paved the way for Eduardo, together with his brothers, to found the Club Internacional de Foot-ball (CIF) on 8 December 1902, which was the natural extension of the Grupo dos Irmãos Pinto Basto and the Foot-Ball Club Swits and which brought together players from Club Lisbonense and other clubs. CIF was the first Portuguese club to play abroad, defeating Madrid Fútbol Clube in 1907 in Madrid. CIF also briefly functioned as an association, organizing the first leagues in the country.
