= Guilherme Pinto Basto =

Pioneer of football (soccer) and tennis in Portugal

- Born: Guilherme Ferreira Pinto Basto; 1 February 1864; Lisbon, Portugal
- Died: 26 July 1957 (aged 93); Lisbon
- Occupation: Entrepreneur
- Known for: Introducing association football and tennis to Portugal; sports administration

Guilherme Ferreira Pinto Basto (1 February 1864 – 26 July 1957) was a Portuguese all-round sportsman and entrepreneur. He is considered to have been the pioneer of both football and tennis in Portugal, playing in the first recorded football match and winning the national tennis championships on nine occasions.

== Early life ==
Guilherme Ferreira Pinto Basto was born in Santa Catarina, a district of the Portuguese capital Lisbon, to a wealthy and aristocratic family. His father was Eduardo Ferreira Pinto Basto and his mother Lucy Custance. After schooling in Portugal until he was 14, he attended various schools abroad, including the Catholic Downside School in southwestern England, as well as other schools in Paris and Germany. Showing great sporting ability from an early age, Pinto Basto became involved in various sports after his return to Portugal, both as a sportsman and as a promoter of sporting organizations. While he is particularly known for having popularized both football and tennis in Portugal, he also took part in hockey, cycling, horse racing, bullfighting, sailing, rowing, car racing and golf. He worked for E. Pinto Basto & Cª Lda., the trading company of his father Eduardo Pinto Basto, and also became a partner in the Vista Alegre porcelain factory that had been set up by his great grandfather, as well as the Anglo-Portuguese Kaolin Company. Pinto Basto married twice: first to Maria Luísa de Portugal de Sousa Coutinho, who died in 1894 and then to a distant cousin, Branca Jervis Atouguia Ferreira Pinto Basto, in 1895.

== Early football in Portugal ==
From around 1870, the Portuguese Royal family began to spend part of the summer in the coastal town of Cascais. Aristocrats, and others who hoped to be close to the King, soon followed, including the Pinto Basto family. The Sporting Club of Cascais was founded in 1879 and counted the Royal Family and the Pinto Basto family amongst its members. In October 1888, an exhibition football match, considered to be the first match on mainland Portugal, was organised on the Parada, the former Parade grounds of the Cascais Citadel, situated next to the Sporting Club (now the Museum of the Sea). A leather ball had been brought back from England by Guilherme's two younger brothers, Eduardo and Frederico, who had also been studying in England. Players included a count, viscounts, other prominent members of Lisbon's high society, and four members of the Pinto Basto family. They reportedly spent the morning of the game removing stones from the field. The 50th anniversary of this match was marked by a game in Lisbon attended by Guilherme Pinto Basto and some other players from the original game.

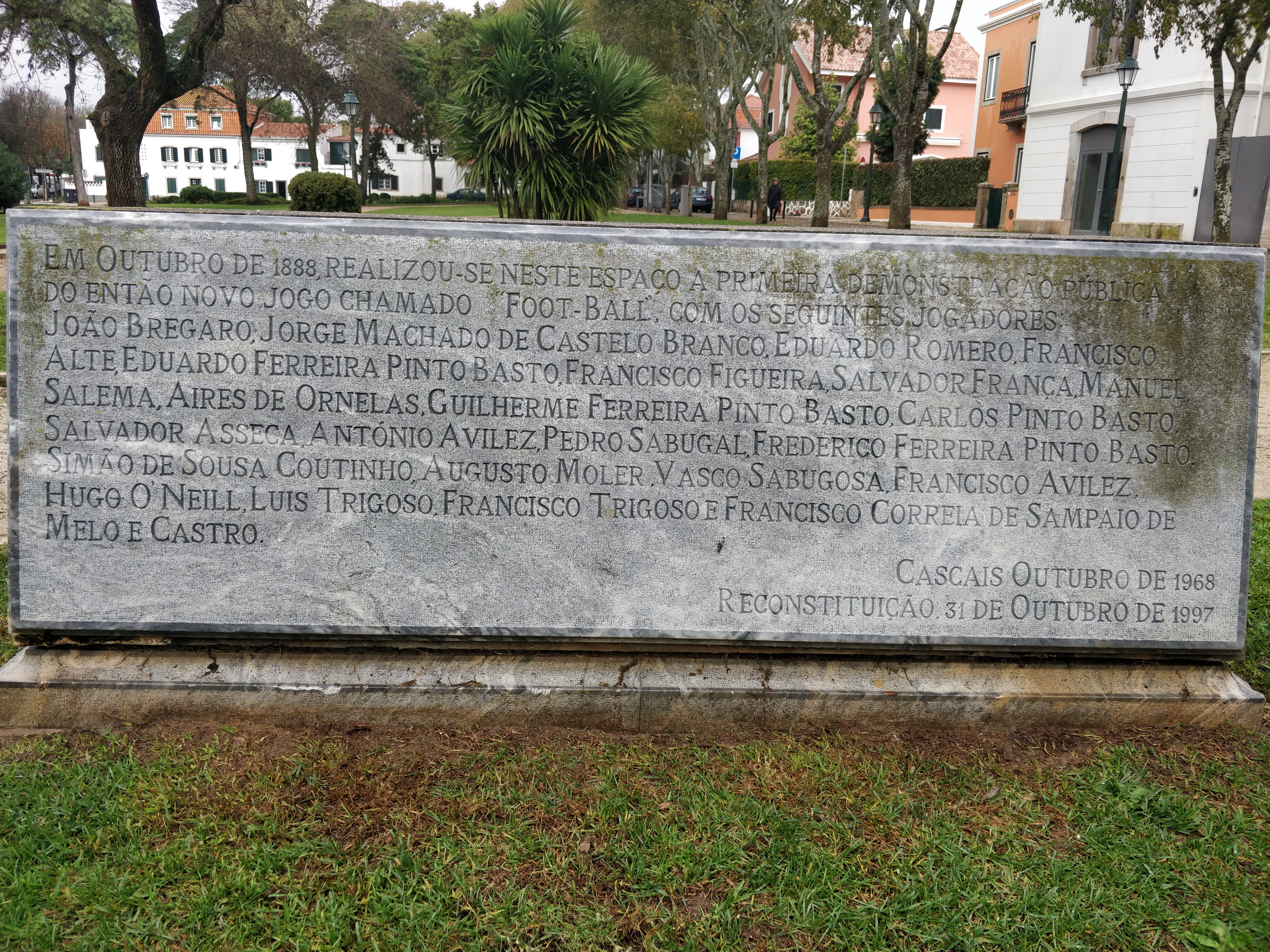
A memorial to the first football match played on mainland Portugal in Cascais in October 1888

A more competitive match, between “Portugal” and a group of Englishmen living in Portugal was organised by Pinto Basto in January 1889. This was held at the spot in Lisbon where the Campo Pequeno Bullring is now located, being won 2–1 by Portugal, with Pinto Basto apparently playing in goal. This can be considered to have been the first proper match in Portuguese history, in that the pitch had markings and goalposts, and the match followed the rules and lasted 90 minutes.

Pinto Basto, together with his brothers, founded Club Lisbonense in 1892, one of the first football clubs in Portugal. Club Lisbonense played its first games against the English who worked at the Cable & Wireless cable station at Carcavelos, who would eventually organize themselves into a Club, the Carcavelos Club. On 25 October 1893, António Nicolau de Almeida, the founder and president of FC Porto, wrote a letter to the president of Club Lisbonense, Guilherme Pinto Basto, to invite them to a football match, scheduled for 2 November of the same year. Pinto Basto accepted the invitation, but not on the scheduled day, because it would not have been possible "to gather, choose the group and arrange the departure in such a short space of time". In the meantime, however, Pinto Basto made the same invitation to Hugh Ponsonby, the then secretary of the Oporto Cricket and Lawn Tennis Club, who at the time also had his own football team due to its rapid growth in England, the homeland of the company's workers. Pinto Basto did this because, unlike FC Porto, the Oporto Cricket owned a football field, Campo Alegre. Ponsonby accepted Pinto Basto's invitation, and together they organized this meeting, which was held a few months later, on 2 March 1894, between Club Lisbonense and Oporto Cricket. They contested the Taça D. Carlos I, a cup named in honour of the donor of the trophy, King Carlos, who attended the match after being convinced to do so by Pinto Basto. The patronage and sponsorship of the King was pivotal to attract a significant number of spectators, as football was practically an unknown sport in Portugal at the time. The match was thus the first major football event in Portugal, and on that day, he played as Lisbon's goalkeeper, keeping a clean sheet in a 1–0 win, thus contributing decisively to help Lisbonense become the very first Portuguese club to win an official title.

Despite the initial victory against the English in 1889, the Portuguese then struggled to field a team able to beat British expatriates. Pinto Basto was one of the founders, together with his brothers, of the Club Internacional de Foot-ball (CIF) in 1902 which brought together players from the Foot-Ball Club Lisbonense and other clubs into a team strong enough to beat the British, which, however, was not achieved until 1907. CIF was the first Portuguese club to play abroad, defeating Madrid Fútbol Clube in 1907 in Madrid. CIF also briefly functioned as an association, organising the first leagues in the country.

== Early tennis ==
Although tennis was first played in Portugal in British clubs, its dissemination amongst the Portuguese was mainly due to those who had been to England. The main credit for this goes to Pinto Basto, who was for many years Portugal's best player. Cascais Sporting Club had courts by 1882 and, as a member, he gave lessons, including to Prince D. Carlos, who would later become the king. Pinto Basto organised the national championships, which he won nine times. Later, he organised regular international tournaments at the Cascais Sporting Club, the first being held in 1902, when he reached the quarter-finals at the age of 37. In 1923 he persuaded Suzanne Lenglen to participate. At the time she was ranked No. 1 in the world and had become a global celebrity. When Portugal required a national association in order to compete in the Davis Cup, Pinto Basto was one of the founders of the Portuguese Tennis Federation in 1925, and he also became the first president. Portugal's National Seniors Tennis Championships are named after him. He was still playing at the age of 86 when he was considered to be the oldest tennis player in the country.

== Witness to Assassination of the King ==
On 1 February 1908, Pinto Basto, a friend of the King and a convinced Royalist, went to the banks of the River Tagus in Lisbon to welcome the King and his family home after a long trip outside of Lisbon. He followed the Royal Carriage on foot and was one of the closest people to the King when he and his elder son, Luís Filipe, were assassinated. Pinto Basto later wrote an account of the shooting and of subsequent events. He recorded that in the confusion he, himself, came close to being shot by the police.

== Honours ==
Pinto Basto died on 26 July 1957 in Lisbon. In Cascais, a football field and a sports hall complex are named after him. Streets bear his name in Vila Franca de Xira and Fernão Ferro.
