= Carlos Villar (footballer) =

Pioneer of football in Portugal (1874–1963)

Personal information
- Birth name: Carlos Augusto Paiva Raposo Vilar
- Date of birth: 18 December 1874
- Place of birth: Santa Catarina, Lisbon, Portugal
- Date of death: 17 July 1963 (aged 88)
- Place of death: Santa Maria de Belém, Lisbon, Portugal
- Position: Forward

Senior career*
Years	Team	Apps	(Gls)
1893–1894	Club Lisbonense		
President Club Internacional de Foot-ball
In office
1902–1907
- * Club domestic league appearances and goals

Carlos Augusto Paiva Raposo Vilar (18 December 1874 – 17 July 1963) was a Portuguese naval officer and a pioneer of football in Portugal.

== Early and personal life ==
Carlos Villar was born on 18 February 1874, in Santa Catarina, Lisbon, as the son of Frederico Barbosa Rodrigues Vilar (1842) and Maria do Carmo de Paiva Raposo Vilar. He was the brother of Luis, Afonso, Virginia, Marta, Maria, Julia, and Alexandre. Following their father's death on 21 March 1912 all of the brothers founded themselves with the right to challenge the same house, so they decided to go trial with the intention of being judged as the only heir of their late father, and such sentence was decided in the second court hearing of this case at the Tribunal da Comarca de Lisboa in November 1913.

== Football ==
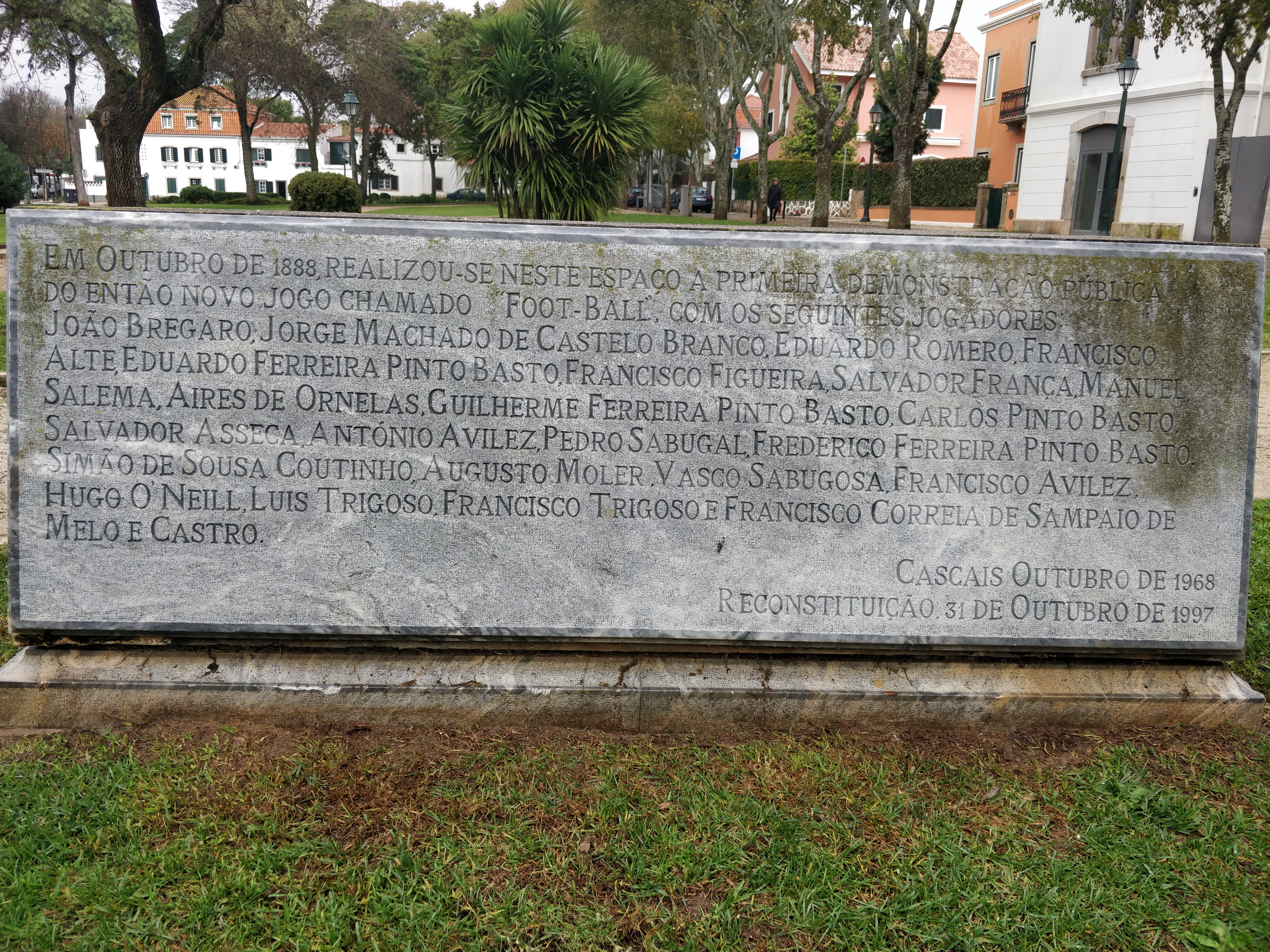
A memorial to the first football match played on mainland Portugal in Cascais in October 1888. The name "Frederico Ferreira Pinto Basto" can be seen in the sixth line.

On the afternoon of 22 January 1889, Villar participated in what is now considered to be the first proper football match on mainland Portugal in Campo Pequeno, in which a group of Portuguese noblemen faced a group of English workers living in Lisbon. The Portuguese team was made up of members of Sporting Club of Cascais, a very elite club patronized by King Luis and King Carlos and by those who could afford to be close to the Royal Family, including counts, viscounts, other prominent members of Lisbon's high society, and two members of the Villar family, Carlos and his older brother Afonso, although some sources state that the two Villars were Afonso and Henrique, which does not suit with any of the known Villar brothers of the time. They reportedly spent the morning of the game removing stones from the field. The position he played is unknown, but he helped his team to a 2–1 win over the much more advanced Englishmen.

In 1892, Carlos and his brother Afonso, together with the Pinto Basto brothers and other football pioneers in the city, founded the first football club in Portugal, Club Lisbonense. Club Lisbonense played its first games against the English who worked at the Cable & Wireless cable station at Carcavelos, who would eventually organize themselves into a Club, the Carcavelos Club. This team went on to face Oporto Cricket Club in the 1894 Taça D. Carlos I on 2 March, in which he started as a forward alongside Afonso in an eventual 1–0 victory.

On 8 December 1902, Villar was one of the founders of the Club Internacional de Foot-ball (CIF), which brought together players from Club Lisbonense and other clubs. The club's board of directors was subsequently elected and he was named the first president of the club. He then wrote the first CIF Statutes, which were approved in the General Assembly of 20 October 1911. In the press at the time, he was considered the João das Regras of football legislation (footballista as it was written in the newspaper). It was also through him that the CIF obtained from the Lisbon City Council the transfer of Campo de Alcântara, the place where the most popular fair of that time was held annually.

CIF was the first Portuguese club to play abroad, defeating Madrid FC in the Spanish capital in 1907. CIF also briefly functioned as an association, organizing the first leagues in the country. Despite the poor conditions offered by the Alcântara field, it was there that the first international meeting took place, in a game played in 1908 between a team from the Portuguese Navy and another made up of sailors from the Swedish cruiser Filgya; the Portuguese won 3–0. The challenge was attended by more than 4,000 people, including all the rectors of the Lisbon Lyceums, teachers, students, and more than 400 sailors.

== Death ==
Villar died in Santa Maria de Belém, Lisbon, on 17 July 1963, at the age of 73.
