= 1894 Taça D. Carlos I =

Taça D. Carlos I
- Event: First cup match in Portugal
Oporto Cricket Club	Club Lisbonense
(Porto)	(Lisbon)
0	1
- Date: 2 March 1894
- Venue: Campo Alegre, Porto
- Referee: Eduardo Pinto Basto
- Attendance: 3,000

The Taça D. Carlos I (English: D. Carlos I Trophy) was a friendly football tournament that was held only once, in Campo Alegre, Porto, on 2 March 1894. That match was contested by representative teams of Lisbon and Porto, and ended in a 1–0 win to the Lisbonenses, but most important than the result was its historical significance, as it was the first major football event in Portugal as well as the first football ‘cup’ played on the Iberian Peninsula. Moreover, the Taça D. Carlos I was the first domestic match between those two cities.

The cup was named in honor of the donator of the trophy, don Carlos I of Portugal, who attended the meeting together with his wife, Queen Amelia, as well as the princes D. Luís Filipe and D. Manuel, who were still boys at the time. This is possibly the first match in which extra-time was played as the royal couple arrived too late to see the first half and the Queen demanded that the game continued after the final whistle because she was enjoying it so much.

The meeting was held at the initiative of the then FC Porto president, António Nicolau de Almeida, but it was ultimately organized by the presidents of Oporto Cricket and Lawn Tennis Club and Club Lisbonense, Hugh Ponsonby and Guilherme Pinto Basto, who served as the captains of their respective sides in the match. Pinto Basto is widely regarded as the father of football in Portugal, and it was he who managed to have the King present, who traveled to Porto to witness the event and present a trophy to the winners. The patronage and sponsorship of the King were pivotal to attract a significant number of spectators, as football was practically an unknown sport in Portugal at the time. The game received international publicity, being publicized outside Portugal, and was even reported in the famous English magazine Illustrated Sporting and Dramatic News, which reported the game as a new "conquest" made by their beloved sport.

== Background ==
On 25 October 1893, António Nicolau de Almeida, the founder and president of the recently established Futebol Clube do Porto, made an attempt to launch the club by writing a letter to the president of Club Lisbonense, Guilherme Pinto Basto, to invite them to a football match, scheduled for 2 November of the same year. Almeida's invitation was published four days later in the Diário Ilustrado, a Lisbon newspaper, printed on page 3 of the 29 October edition, together with the response from Pinto Basto, who accepts the invitation, but not on the scheduled day, because according to him, it would not be possible "to gather, choose the group and arrange the departure in such a short space of time".

In the midtime, however, Pinto Basto made the same invitation to Hugh Ponsonby, the then secretary of the Oporto Cricket and Lawn Tennis Club, a multi-sports club that at the time also had his own football team due to its rapid growth in England, the homeland of the club's members. Pinto Basto did this because, unlike FC Porto, the Oporto Cricket owned a football field, Campo Alegre. Ponsonby accepted Pinto Basto's invitation, and together they organized this meeting, which was held a few months later at Campo Alegre, between Club Lisbonense and Oporto Cricket. However, that honor has been wrongly attributed to FC Porto, who on the contrary of what has been widely believed throughout the years, had nothing to do with this game.

== Pre-match ==
Convinced by Pinto Basto, his majesty the King D. Carlos gave his patronage to the match, offering a solid silver cup made by the jeweler of the Royal house, which become known as the Taça D. Carlos I, or even Cup d'El Rey, and had an inscription that said: Football Championship das Cidades de Portugal (English: Football championship of the cities of Portugal), thus creating a national cup based on the idea of the competition being held annually by "football teams from all the Portuguese cities". The cup would be played at the field of the previous season's winner and the first team to win it three consecutive seasons would keep the trophy permanently. However, only one edition was played, contested by one team from Porto, Oporto Cricket Club, and one from Lisbon, Club Lisbonense (the predecessor of CIF). Some sources state, incorrectly, that the Lisbon team was a mix of Club Lisbonense, Carcavelos Club and Braço de Prata.

Moreover, the King also requested for the match to be included in the official program of the commemorative celebrations of the 600th anniversary of Prince Henry the Navigator, organized in Porto, in memory of the infante. Another Royal demand was: "at least six players from each representative team would have to be Portuguese, and the remaining five foreigners would have to live there for more than three months". This demand was apparently forgotten as both clubs failed to use six Portugueses, with Lisbon using four and Porto only two.

== Overview ==
The Lisbon team went to Porto by train on a journey that took 14 hours. Three hours after landing, in Campanhã, the game was played on the field belonging to the Oporto Cricket and Lawn Tennis Club, in Campo Alegre. It was scheduled for three in the afternoon, but it started a quarter of an hour later. Admission was free and there were plenty of curious friends of the town's football players. Porto wore blue shirts and Lisbon wore cream-colored. The driving forces of this match, Guilherme Pinto Basto and Hugh Ponsonby, were also the captains of their respective sides. The game was refereed by Guilherme's brother, Eduardo.

Club Lisbonense scored the only goal of the match, securing a 1–0 win, thus becoming the very first Portuguese club to win an official title. The name of the goal scorer does not appear in any chronicle, thus the author of this historic goal remains completely unknown. It is only known that the Vilar brothers (Afonso and Carlos), C.D. Rankin, and Arthur Paiva Raposo contributed to Lisbon's victory.

D. Carlos, D. Amélia, and the princes only arrived towards the end of the match, and after the final whistle was blown, Her Majesty the Queen demanded the game to continue for another 10 minutes because she was enjoying it so much, but establishing that these additional minutes would not have any influence on the result of the match. Because of this, the 1894 Taça D. Carlos I is possibly the very first match in which extra-time was played on the Iberian Peninsula, and maybe even one of the first to do so in continental Europe.

== Final details ==
2 March 1894
15:15

Oporto Cricket Club (Porto)	0–1	(Lisbon) Club Lisbonense
	Report	?

Campo Alegre, Porto
Attendance: 3,000
Referee: Eduardo Pinto Basto

GK	1	(England) MacGeock
DF	2	(Portugal) F. Guimarães
DF	3	(England) A. Nugent
MF	4	(England) A. Dagge
MF	5	(England) MacMilan
MF	6	(England) Albert Kendall
FW	7	(England) Hugh Ponsonby (Cap)
FW	8	(Portugal) Adolfo Ramos
FW	9	(England) MacKeckenie
FW	10	(England) R. Ray
FW	11	(England) Alfred Kendall

GK	1	(Portugal) Guilherme Pinto Basto (Cap)
DF	2	(England) M. Keating
DF	3	(England) R. Locke
MF	4	(England) C.D. Rankin
MF	5	(England) Clyde de Barley
MF	6	(Portugal) Arthur Paiva Raposo
FW	7	(England) F. Palmer
FW	8	(Portugal) Carlos Villar
FW	9	(England) J. Pittuck
FW	10	(Portugal) Afonso Villar
FW	11	(England) J. Thomson

Note: At least six players from each team had to be Portuguese. The remaining five foreigners would have to live in Portugal for more than three months.

== The trophy ==
It is very beautiful, a piece of art, with the inscription of the date and offer of King D. Carlos. It's in silver. A replica is being made so that people can see and admire this trophy.

— António Vila Maior, the vice-president of CIF

The so-called "D. Carlos I trophy", which had been offered by the king himself, was nothing more than a simple silver cup, which was handed over to Guilherme Pinto Basto, the captain of the Lisbon team, who won the match. Pinto Basto kept it until the foundation of the CIF in 1902, when he handed it over to them. The trophy remained there as one of the most beautiful and important rarities in the history of Portuguese football.

== Aftermath ==
The game also received international publicity, being publicized outside Portugal, and was even reported in the famous English magazine Illustrated Sporting & Dramatic News, which reported the game as a new "conquest" made by their beloved sport. Eight days after the match between FC Porto and FC Lisbonense, O Sport published the following note: "On Sunday, 11 March, some members of the Foot Ball Club do Porto were on the field of the old hippodrome of Matosinhos, training for two hours".

== See also ==
- Football in Portugal
- First football match in Portugal
