= Fort of São Sebastião de Caparica =

Fort in Portugal

- Forte de São Sebastião de Caparica
- Setúbal, Península de Setúbal, Lisbon in Portugal
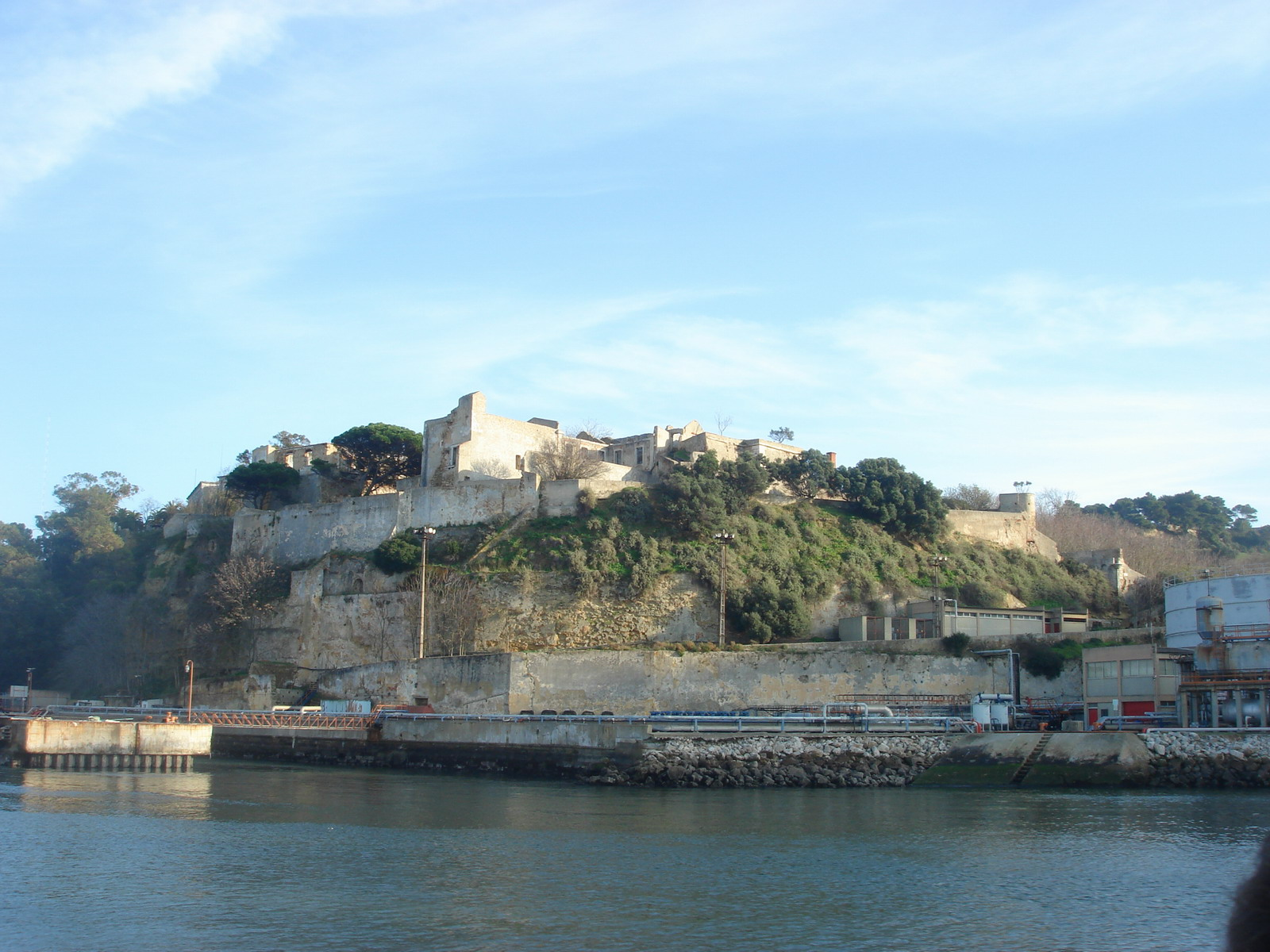
- A profile of the rock and fortifications of São Sebastião de Caparica

Site information
- Type: Fort
- Owner: Portuguese Republic
- Operator: Concelho de Almada

Location
- Coordinates: 38°40′34.24″N 9°12′34.88″W

Site history
- Built: 16th century
- Materials: Stone, Masonry

The Fort of São Sebastião de Caparica (Portuguese: Forte de São Sebastião de Caparica) also known as the Tower of São Sebastião (Portuguese: Torre de São Sebastião) or Fortress of the Old Tower (Portuguese: Fortaleza de Torre Velha) is a medieval fortification located in Monte da Caparica, civil parish of Caparica, in the municipality of Almada, in the Portuguese central region of Península de Setúbal.

The fortress of Torre Velha is one of the more important examples of Renaissance-era military architecture, at a time when it served as part of an integrated system of defensive artillery outposts at the end of the 15th and beginning of the 16th century, in particular with the bulwarks of Tower of Santo António de Cascais (1498) and São Vicente (1512).

== History ==
The Old Tower, situated on the southern margin of the Tagus River, was commissioned by King John II, on the same site of the older Fort of Caparica (which was built in the reign of his father, King John I). The fort received its name Torre Velha mostly because the structure was considered "older" than the Tower of São Vicente (Portuguese: Torre de São Vicente), which later be known as the Tower of Belém. Its original structure, from the sketches of Garcia de Resende, comprised a tower and bulwark, similar to the model developed years later in the Fort of Santiago da Barra in Viana do Castelo and the Tower of Belém in Lisbon. Defences along the estuary and port of Lisbon were based on a system of three towers, which were supplied with modern artillery (including the Bulwarks of Cascais and the São Vicente), which cooperated with the naval artillery (which patrolled the waters of the river) to enforce military and fiscal authority.

In 1571, following similar initiatives taken at several forts along the Portuguese coast, King Sebastian ordered the remodelling of the tower. At the time, the fort was named in the Portuguese tradition in honour of São Brás (Saint Blaise), the patron saint of artillerymen, and changed to honour the young King (lost at the Battle of Alcácer Quibir) and Saint Sebastian. Under the responsibility of Afonso Álvares, the new project transformed the fort into a massive fortress, becoming referred to as the Fortress of São Sebastião da Caparica (Portuguese: Fortaleza de São Sebastião da Caparica). Between 1580 and 1640 it was referred to locally as the Torre dos Castelhanos (Tower of the Castilians), where it was remodelled structurally to meet the requirements of the Philippine Dynasty.

Between 1640 and the 18th century, a branch of the Távora dynastic clan in Almada served as governors of the Old Tower, paying particular attention to remodelling during the 17th century.

By 1692, the fundamental aspects of the fort were established; the 15th century towers, the walls along the east and south, the three bulwarks, a governor's residence, a chapel (consecrated to Saint Blaise and Saint Sebastian), integrated coat-of-arms and a staircase along the southeast facade. In the second half of the 18th century, there are indications that the terrain (and buildings) along the river were consolidated. These aspects were recorded in the Coleção Casa de Cadaval (Cadaval House Collection) in the Torre do Tombo archives.

Information from 1767 showed the Old Tower (now known as São Sebastião) on a hill, providing a crossfire zone with Tower of Belém on the opposite bank of the Tagus.

In a report written on 9 September 1794, by Guilherme Luís António de Valleré, directed to the Minister of War (Portuguese: Ministro da Guerra), the Duke of Lafões, it was indicated that the tower was undergoing restoration. This restoration continued from 1794 to 1796, under the direction of Colonel Francisco D'Alincourt.

The fortresses of the southern margin were deactivated in 1801, at the end of the War of the Oranges, when Spanish and French forces invaded Portugal. A survey completed at the end of 1808 included a precise inventory of the armaments in the fort at the time of its decommissioning, including: five 36-calibre bronze pieces, four 18-calibre, nine 12-calibre, five 24-calibre iron pieces, nine 18-calibre iron pieces, six 6-calibre iron pieces, six 45-calibre artillery pieces in state of disrepair, and nine 12-calibre in the same condition, in addition to two marine 36-calibre carts, five marine 24-calibre carts, 13 18-calibre marine carts, six 6-calibre marine carts, and 2400 balls (of two-, eight-, 18- and 36-calibre).

It was suggested that, in 1811, the space used to warehouse artillery accessories was used for prisoners. Similarly, on 13 August 1814, it was determined that the Fort could serve as quarantine for lodging passengers and crews suspected of carrying contagious diseases. This included Rafael Bordalo Pinheiro who was suspected of having yellow fever, and was eventually sent to Brazil; the artist and humourist later made light of Portuguese regulations and poor treatment facilities.

On 29 May 1815, the fort was deactivated by order of the government, while part of its buildings were conserved as lodging for the security forces used to guard people in quarantine and those with leprosy.

A new survey of the munitions on site in January 1828 revealed a smaller quantity of artillery, including: one 28-calibre iron piece; six 6-calibre iron pieces; 17 13-calibre iron pieces; two 98-calibre iron mortars; 2,500 balls (of various calibres) and 50 9-calibre bombs.

In 1832, the tower was remodelled and reactivated once more. On recommissioning the batteries had a smaller complement of munitions and artillery, including: two 26-calibre pieces; six 24-calibre pieces and three 18-calibre weapons. The complement of soldiers garrisoning the site included one subordinate, one sergeant, three privates and 31 soldiers.

By the middle of the 19th century, the Old Tower was declared of no interest, and began acting as a second-class military facility. But, by 1894, the site was no longer used for this purpose, and began to serve as storage and housing (acting as an annex for the munitions warehouses of nearby Porto Brandão).

In 1859, its quarantine role was discontinued, passing to another institution nearby, although the guards continued to be housed onsite. Eventually, the fortress was abandoned.

The process to classify the Old Tower began in 1982, ending in its recognition as a National Monument (Portuguese: Monumento Nacional) on 12 April 1996.

== Architecture ==
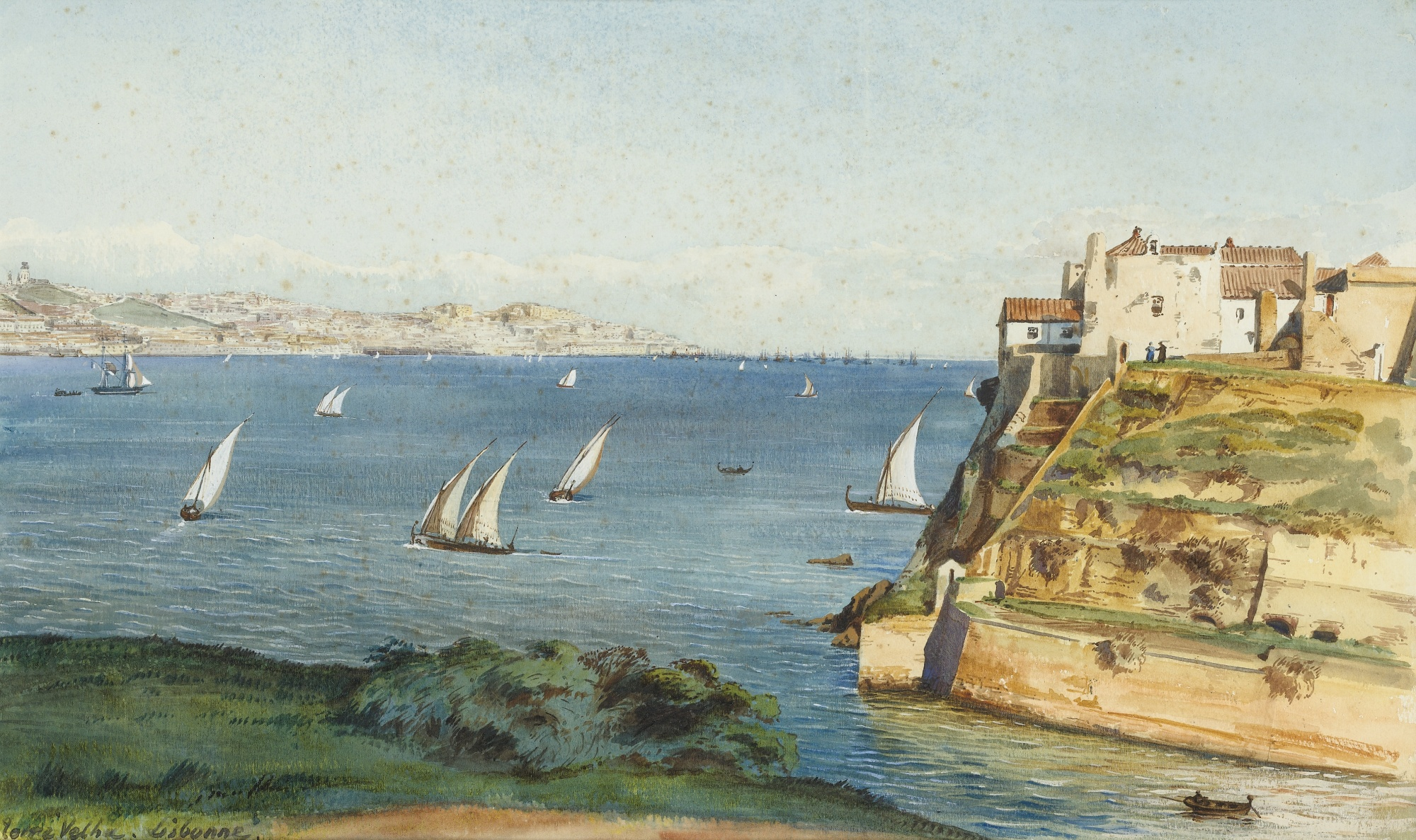
Watercolor by François d'Orléans, Prince of Joinville, Torre Velha with Lisbon in the background.

The structure is located on Periurban, a hill on the southern shore of the Tagus River, between two small creeks, that of the Porto Brandão and Paulina, approximately opposite the Tower of Belém.

The U-shaped plan is formed from three corps, two oriented to the south, with the final "rounded" block (joining the two), serving as the battery's esplanade. At the southwest corner of the fortress, is the bulwark and watchtower. Around the principal nucleus of the fortress is a second tier of spaces used for lodging; there are three bulwarks and barracks (one on the northeast, another along the southeast and a final one in the south, along the wall with cannons). Owing to erosion of the front/seaside facade, it is impossible to determine any further archaeological significance. The buildings over the older parapets were the result of the structure's transformation into shelter/residences for lepers, and consist of six T-shaped extensions to the main structure to create the Asilo de Caparica (Asylum of Caparica).

The central area of the fort is an ample rectangular space with doorway and window, with the residence of the governor alongside. The fortress survived into the 20th century, maintaining many of the fundamental aspects established in the 17th century, in a plan designed in 1692. The design was ostensibly a U-shaped plan, composed of three spaces and three bulwarks with barracks, one of the extremities of the fort extends from a battlement to a watchtower. Alongside the gate, is a chapel, constructed and dedicated to São Sebastião.

The central body of the Old Tower was a rectangular plan, with the Governor's house inside. The old gate of the main square, near the tower, includes a coat-of-arms of Portugal.

The battlements consist of 15th century stonework, while the tower, the corbels, gatehouse and gateway access to the chapel were constructed in the 17th century. At the end of the 18th century, the fortress received new remodelling, possibly involving consolidation of the fortifications, under the supervision of Colonel Francisco D'Alincourt.

The battlements and machicolations are still visible on the walls, with the beams of another on the top floors. This part of the tower is covered in a barrel vault, while a terrace is located on its surface, with an external staircase to access the second floor (between the floor and roof), allowing communication between both by doorway. Small calibre artillery or machicolations probably supported the balcony and wall. A coat-of-arms is located on the lintel of the door, in the old military square, with the Portuguese heraldry.
