= Oporto Cricket and Lawn Tennis Club =

Sports Club in Portugal

- Nickname(s): Oporto Cricket Club
- Short name: OCLTC
- Founded: 1855; 170 years ago
- Ground: Campo Alegre

The Oporto Cricket and Lawn Tennis Club is a multi-sports and social club located on Campo Alegre in Porto, Portugal. It was founded in 1855 by the British people working in Porto. Initially founded as Oporto Cricket Club, it is the oldest cricket club in mainland Europe. In 1877 they built three tennis courts and the name of the club was changed to its current form. In 1923 the present grounds were acquired.

It was one of the first companies to play football in Portugal, and in 1894, the club disputed the first football cup played on the Iberian Peninsula, the Taça D. Carlos I, which they lost to a team from Lisbon.

== History ==
=== Origins ===
In the mid 19th century, Porto enjoyed one of the most developed industries in the country, mainly thanks to its wine industry, and for this reason, Porto soon became the home to a British colony, that like in the rest of the world, brought cricket with them, and later football. They began to play cricket matches against each other to pass the time, undergo leisure initiatives, and feel more at home, and inevitably, they founded Oporto Cricket Club in 1855, and it soon become the center of the social life of the Porto British colony. Its grounds were situated south of the River Douro, at Candal in Vila Nova de Gaia, Portugal's second-largest city, and from where the Port wine was exported until 1896. In 1877 they built three tennis courts, and the name of the club was thus changed to Oporto Cricket and Lawn Tennis Club.

=== The glory years ===
During the first years of cricket in Portugal, there was a healthy rivalry between the Porto club and the ex-pats in Lisbon. The first cricket match against Lisbon took place in the Portuguese capital in 1861 and the first return match in Porto in 1867. Moreover, cricket teams visit from the United Kingdom regularly during the spring and summer.

In October 1893, the president of the recently established Futebol Clube do Porto, António Nicolau de Almeida, made an attempt to launch the club with an invitation to Guilherme Pinto Basto, the president of Club Lisbonense, to a football game in Porto, but Pinto Basto declined and instead made the same invitation to Hugh Ponsonby, the then secretary of the Oporto Cricket and Lawn Tennis Club, who accepted it because, at the time, they already had a section dedicated to football due to its rapid growth in England, the homeland of the company's workers. The game ended up taking place in March of the following year on the Oporto Cricket field, the Campo Alegre, with the Oporto Cricket equipment, and with Hugh Ponsonby as team captain. Of the eleven starters who played for Oporto Cricket that day, only two were Portuguese, Francisco Guimarães and Adolfo Ramos, with the latter being the only one who was not a member of Oporto Cricket. The game ended in a 0–1 loss and it was sponsored by the King Carlos I of Portugal, which was pivotal to attract a significant number of spectators, as football was practically an unknown sport in Portugal at the time.

=== Recent years ===
Throughout the 20th century, the entity developed into a club with several sports at hand. In addition to cricket, tennis, and football, the Oporto club also hosts other modalities such as squash, billiards, snooker, with pool being opened in the summer months between April and September.
