= António Nicolau de Almeida =

Portuguese football executive (1873–1948)

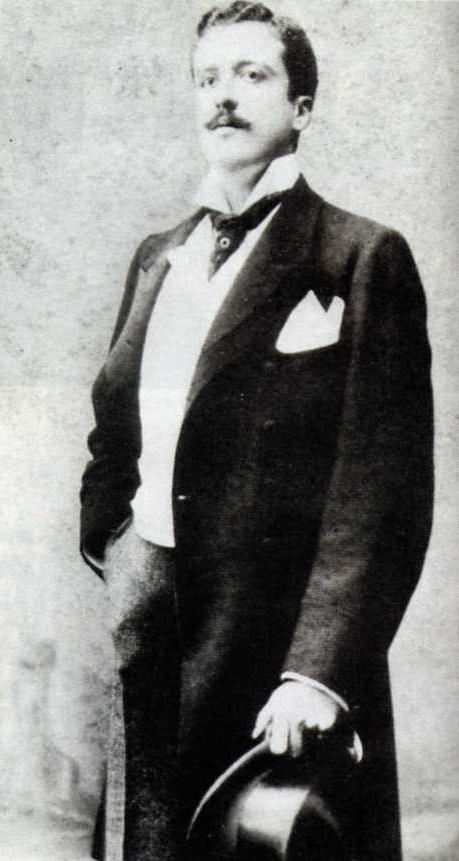

1st President of FC Porto
- In office 1893–1896
- Succeeded by: José Monteiro da Costa
- Born: 19 October 1873; Porto, Portugal
- Died: 21 February 1948 (aged 74); Porto, Portugal
- Citizenship: Portuguese
- Occupations: Entrepreneur; businessman
- Known for: Founder of FC Porto

António Nicolau de Almeida (19 October 1873 – 21 February 1948) was a Portuguese football executive, who founded FC Porto on 28 September 1893 and then served as its first president until 1896, when he gave up from the club at the request of his wife.

== Early years ==
António Nicolau de Almeida was born on 19 October 1873 in the Portuguese city of Porto. He was a partner of his father in a company that exported port wine, but at the same time, he was also a sports lover, and his first passion was velocipedia. The oldest account of Almeida's sporting activity can be found in 1891, when together with Fernando Nicolau d´Almeida, Vieira da Cruz, Lacy Rumsey, Artur Rumsey, and George Dagge, he was part of a group of pedal lovers who were working hard in favor of velocipedia under the name Clube Excursionista, and then, in 1892, under the new name of Clube de Velocipedistas do Porto. They tried to carry out tours and excursions on bicycles, some races, making good publicity at the expense of their enormous enthusiasm, thus achieving a respectable number of members in a short period time, and thus drawing the attention of Velo Clube, who after absorbing the 44 members of the Clube de Velocipedistas do Porto, starts to use the name of Real Velo Clube do Porto, which had its premises in the Palácio de Cristal. During the second half of 1893, many people entered, including His Highness Infante D. Afonso and, at the end of the same year, His Majesty the king grants the farm of his palace on Rua do Triunfo (now the Soares dos Reis National Museum) for the construction of the velodrome, thus showing the great interest that the royalty had on sports.

== FC Porto ==
=== Foundation of the club ===
In addition to cycling, he also practiced the very Portuguese Jogo do Pau, rowing and swimming. In 1893, shortly after embarking on the adventure of founding the Real Velo Club, the 20-year-old left on a business trip to England. There he developed a deep interest in football, and on his return, he brought some balls and the desire to launch the sport in Porto outside the closed circuits of the English, wishing to organize a football club in his homeland. And so, cooling off the ardor he had put on the Velo Clube, he decided, with his cycling friends, to found another club, a football club: Foot-Ball Club do Porto. Being a staunch monarchist, he timed it to the birthday of both the Portuguese king and his wife, who were born on the same day, on 28 September. This is also why the colors of the royal house of Portugal - white and blue - were chosen as the club colors. In the following month, a Board was formed that had António Nicolau de Almeida as president and Joaquim Ferreira Duarte as president of the General Assembly.

=== Taça D. Carlos I ===
On 25 October 1893, Almeida, who was the FC Porto president at the time, wrote a letter to the president of Club Lisbonense, Guilherme Pinto Basto, inviting them to a football match, scheduled for 2 November of the same year, with which he wished "to seal the definitive installation of Foot Ball Club do Porto". Almeida's invitation was published four days later in the Diário Ilustrado, a Lisbon newspaper, printed on page 3 of the 29 October 1893 edition, together with the response from Pinto Basto, who accepted the invitation, but rescheduled the game for March of the following year. And so, on 2 March 1894, FC Porto, with nine Englishmen, disputed the Taça D. Carlos I, a cup named in honour of the donor of the trophy, King Carlos, who attended the match after being convinced to do so by Pinto Basto. The patronage and sponsorship of the King was pivotal to attract a significant number of spectators, as football was practically an unknown sport in Portugal at the time. The match was thus the first major football event in Portugal and Lisbonense won 1–0, thus failing to win the very first cup awarded in Portuguese football.

=== Leaving the club due to his wife ===
In 1896, Almeida married an Englishwoman, Hilda Ramsay, the sister of his clubmates Arthur and Lacy Rumsey. Hilda hated football, considering it a rude and violent sport, preferring tennis, and insisted that her husband should leave the club and focus on the wine business, and eventually, she manages to convince Almeida to withdraw from the club he created. Almeida then joins the aristocratic Sporting Club of Cascais, and on 26 October 1900, he played a tennis tournament, sponsored by King D. Carlos, between the teams from Lisbon and Porto, and it was Lisbon won as before in football. Without him, FC Porto entered a doldrums and stagnation, and shortly thereafter, Porto effectively ceased to exist. Ten years later, however, on 2 August 1906, the club was revived by Almeida's close friend José Monteiro da Costa. It remains unclear if the claims that Almeida asked him to do so are true or just fiction.

== Death ==
He died in Porto on 21 February 1948, at the age of 74, and is buried in the cemetery of Agramonte very close to the ruins of the theater of Baquet.
