= Caparica =

- Civil parish
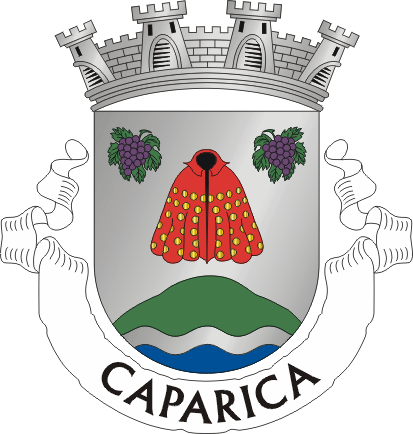
- Coat of arms

- Location in Portugal
- Coordinates: 38.664°N 9.200°W
- Country: Portugal
- Region: Lisbon
- Metropolitan area: Lisbon
- District: Setúbal
- Municipality: Almada
- Disbanded: 2013

Area
  - Total: 11.02 km^{2} (4.25 sq mi)

Population (2011)
  - Total: 20,454
  - Density: 1,900/km^{2} (4,800/sq mi)
- Time zone: UTC+00:00 (WET)
  - Summer (DST): UTC+01:00 (WEST)
- Postal code: P-2825
- Website: www.jf-caparica.pt

Caparica is a former civil parish in the municipality (concelho) of Almada, Lisbon metropolitan area, Portugal. In 2013, the parish merged with the civil parish of Trafaria into the new parish Caparica e Trafaria. The population in 2011 was 20,454, in an area of 11.02 km^{2}.

== Location ==
Caparica is situated on the Setúbal Peninsula, south of the Tagus River. On the opposite bank of the Tagus lies Belém, a civil parish of Lisbon. Caparica lies west of the central part of Almada Municipality and west of the 25 de Abril Bridge.

== History ==
The name Caparica is probably derived from the Latin word capparis, which means caper. Caparica may have been founded during the Roman conquest of the Iberian Peninsula. It became a parish in 1472, and it became a town on September 27, 1985.

== Localities ==
The parish of Caparica includes the following localities:

- Vila Nova de Caparica
- Capuchos
- Funchalinho
- Areeiro
- Granja
- Fómega
- Alcaniça
- Raposo
- Pera
- Monte de Caparica
- Torre
- Fonte Santa
- Serrado
- Pilotos
- Costas de Cão
- Banática
- Porto Brandão
- Lazarim

== Points of interest ==
- Convent of the Capuchins
- Church of Nossa Senhora do Monte de Caparica
- Forte de São Sebastião da Caparica
