= Museum of the Sea, Cascais =

Maritime and fishing museum in Portugal

King D. Carlos Sea Museum, Cascais
- Museu do Mar Rei D. Carlos
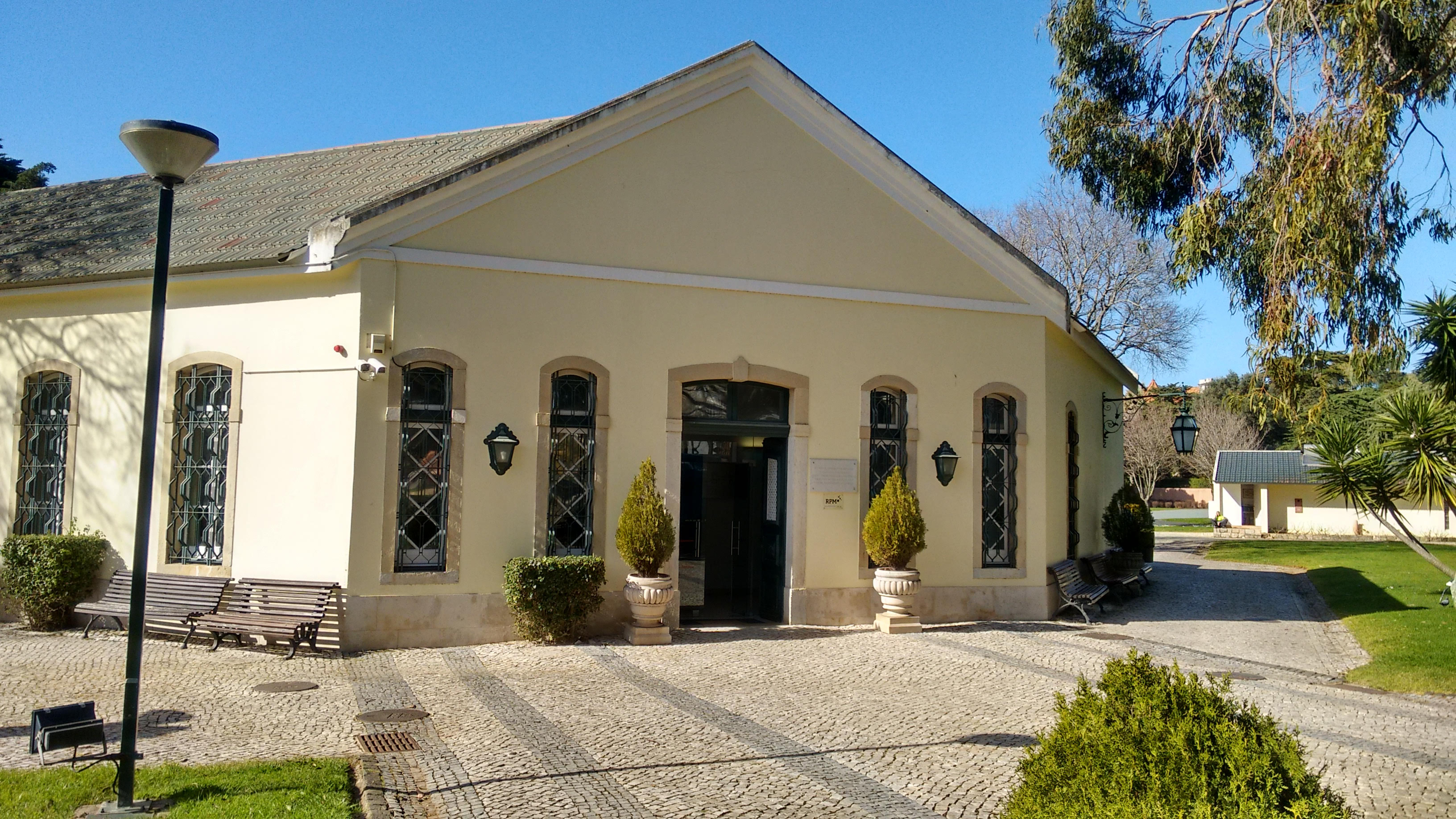

- Location within Portugal
- Established: 1992; 34 years ago
- Location: R. Júlio Pereira de Mello, 2750-319 Cascais
- Coordinates: 38.6952°N 9.4249°W

The King D. Carlos Sea Museum (Portuguese: Museu do Mar Rei D. Carlos) is a Maritime Museum in the fishing town of Cascais, Lisbon District, in Portugal. It was inaugurated in 1992.

== Origins ==
The museum is housed in the former Cascais Sporting Club. This was founded in 1879 by the then Prince Carlos of Portugal to promote sports and host social events. Built on the former parade ground of the nearby Citadel of Cascais, the members, who came from the nobility, came to be known as “of the Parade”, compared with those who were “not of the Parade”. For a time the club was known as the Royal Sporting Club of Cascais but the use of “royal” was dropped after the establishment of the First Portuguese Republic. The club was disbanded in 1974. Its documentation is retained in the Cascais Municipal Archives, held at the nearby Casa Sommer.

== The museum ==
In 1976, the building became the property of the Municipality of Cascais. Planning of the museum began in 1978 but it was not opened until 1992. It was expanded in 1997 with a new exhibition space devoted to maritime ethnography, which aimed to increase understanding of the fishing community of Cascais. Further expansion was carried out in 2006 with the opening of a room dedicated to underwater archaeology, primarily shipwrecks. Improvements continued in 2008 with the main octagonal room and the People of the Seas room, dedicated to the history and experiences of the fishing community of the town, with models of fisherfolk and examples of their clothing and nets. There is also a boat gallery with models of fishing boats and pleasure craft that once sailed in the River Tagus, which meets the sea close to Cascais.

A further exhibit covers “King Carlos and Oceanographic Science”. This project was a collaboration of several institutions, including the Vasco da Gama Aquarium, the Portuguese Navy Museum, the Natural History Museum of London, and the Oceanographic Museum of Monaco, among others, and reconstructs the main research activities of the king and his team aboard the yacht Amélia IV. Another exhibit relates to the Portuguese Navy and Navigation. Navigational instruments including compasses and lanterns, together with bronze gun dating from the seventeenth century, are displayed.

A section is also devoted to biodiversity with models of animals displayed including a porcupinefish, a Bottlenose skate, various types of sharks including the sevengilled shark, Atlantic bluefin tuna, the sperm whale and the pygmy sperm whale. The museum's collection of marine fossils is also exhibited as part of an exhibition entitled “The Sea and the Origin of Life”. This was developed through collaboration with foreign institutions and with researchers from the National Museum of Natural History and Science, which is attached to the University of Lisbon.
