= Club Internacional de Foot-ball =

Portuguese sports club

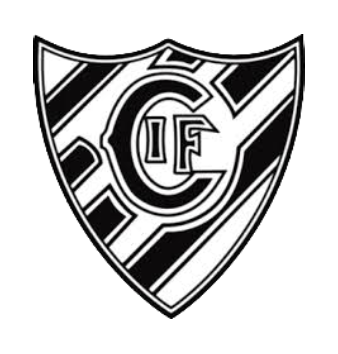
- Full name: Club Internacional de Football
- Short name: CIF
- Founded: November 1902
- Dissolved: January 1924
- Ground: Estádio Pinto Basto
- Chairman: Guilherme Pinto Basto
- League: Taça de Portugal

Club Internacional de Foot-ball is a sports club founded in 1902, from Lisbon, Portugal.

In 1924 the club decided to end its football team claiming the sport's amateurism ideals were being lost. Since then the club's main focus are basketball, youth football and tennis.

== Origins ==
The failed attempts to reorganize Club Lisbonense and Grupo Estrela paved the way for the appearance of the Club Internacional de Foot-Ball on 8 December 1902, which was the natural extension of the Grupo dos Irmãos Pinto Basto (English: Pinto Basto Brothers Group) and the Foot-Ball Club Swits. This is how in the first days of December 1902, a group of football enthusiasts gathered in a room at the Clube Naval Madeirense, deciding that the "Grupo dos Pinto Basto" would be reorganized and reinforced in order to make it stronger and thus be able to finish up with the power of the Carcavelos Club.

It was necessary, however, to give a name to the new Club. Due to the diversity of nationalities in the club's name, the idea of including the word International came up. Thus, the definitive name for Club Internacional de Foot-Ball was born, which was immediately liked, even because the acronym was small, suggestive and simple to fix "CIF". In a meeting held in Lisbon on late December 1902, the club's board of directors was established as follows: Commander Joaquim Costa as President of the General Assembly, Carlos Villar as Portuguese Director, C. Bolt as English Director and Paulo de Almeida as Treasurer. Fernando Pinto Basto was chosen as captain, while Eduardo Pinto Basto, W. Sissener and Abel Macedo were appointed to the Technical Council.

The first headquarters of the Club Internacional de Foot-Ball was at Rua Pereira de Sousa, in Campo de Ourique. Until then, correspondence was received at the club's treasurer's home and notices addressed to members and players were made through the daily press.

== Early success ==
In the first years after its foundation, the CIF limited itself to holding private matches with the English groups Carcavelos Club, Lisbon Cricket Club, Sport Lisboa (currently known as S.L. Benfica), and with the Black Cross. From 1904 onwards, with the creation of Sport Lisboa, later S.L. Benfica, they had a strong rivalry, with the games between the two of them being played with great intensity. The first derby between Sport Lisboa and CIF was in March 1904, with Sport Lisboa winning 1–0.

In 1912, CIF participated in the first incarnation of a Portuguese Cup, organized at the initiative of Sport Clube Império. Unfortunately, only four clubs signed up, namely CIF, Sport Lisboa e Benfica, Sporting Clube de Portugal, and the hosts, Sport Clube Império. The draw dictated that SLB face SCI and CIF face SCP. The first game was held on 28 January 1912, between Sport Lisboa e Benfica and Sport Clube Império, with the President of the Republic, Dr. Manuel de Arriaga, attending the game, and Benfica won by 3–0, however, the match between CIF and Sporting was never played and Benfica were winners. In the following edition in 1913, the same four teams participated and this time both semi-finals were held, with Benfica beating Império again and CIF beating Sporting on 23 February by a score of 3–2, however, CIF decided to not play the final, so at not to lose the prestige won at the Regional Championship of Lisboa, having won the 1910–11 Campeonato de Lisboa.

CIF was the first Portuguese club to play abroad, having played at the Hipódromo de la Castellana in Madrid, Spain, against the Madrid FC (currently known as Real Madrid CF). The meeting took place on 5 January 1907, and the Portuguese team earned a delicious 2–0 victory over the Spaniards, thus becoming the first Portuguese team to do so. Two days later, he repeated the result against Athletic de Madrid (currently known as Atlético de Madrid).

== Amateur club ==
In 1924, the CIF took a decision that would mark it to this day. In a decisive way, the club decided to take a path that was completely different from the oldest clubs in Lisbon, partners, and rivals at the time. CIF decided to abandon the official football championships on the grounds that the amateur ideal of the king sport was being distorted with the offer of prizes and other benefits to players.

He did not, however, abandon the practice of football, which would remain open at the club to all who wished to do so, as long as the principles of amateurism and the Olympic ideal were respected. Contrary to all expectations, the CIF has long been a reference for amateur sports in the country. CIF followed its route by practicing multiple sports, even leading some of them, being today a prestigious club.

== Honours ==
- Campeonato de Lisboa
  - Champions (1): 1910–11
- National Olympic games
  - Champions (1): 1911
