= Club Lisbonense =

Portuguese sports club

- Full name: Foot-Ball Club Lisbonense
- Short name: Club Lisbonense
- Founded: 1892
- Dissolved: 1902
- Ground: Estádio Pinto Basto, Lisbon
- Chairman: Guilherme Pinto Basto
Home colours

Foot-Ball Club Lisbonense, better known as Club Lisbonense, was a football team based in Lisbon, Portugal, which existed between 1892 and 1902. Lisbonense played a crucial role in the amateur beginnings of football in Portugal, being the very first football club in the capital, winning the first football ‘cup’ in the country on 2 March 1894 and then being at the roots of the foundation of the Club Internacional de Foot-ball. Their equipment was blue.

== History ==
=== Beginnings ===
Club Lisbonense was founded in 1892 by a group of footballing pioneers in the city, which consisted of the Pinto Basto brothers (Eduardo, Guilherme, and Frederico), Carlos and Afonso Villar, Carlos Paiva Raposo, Edgar Plantier, Mariano Cardoso, Herculano Moura, Valentim Machado, Ernesto da Fonseca and A. Silva. They paid a monthly fee of 100 reis.

Club Lisbonense played its first games against the English who worked at the Cable & Wireless cable station at Carcavelos, who would eventually organize themselves into a Club, the Carcavelos Club, which later gave rise to the Carcavelos Sport Club. These two groups were the first promoters of football in Lisbon, and football began taking root in the city, especially among the youth, thus the game soon reached colleges and so, Lisbonense and Carcavelos are joined by a team made up of students from Colégio Villar.

=== 1894 Taça D. Carlos I ===
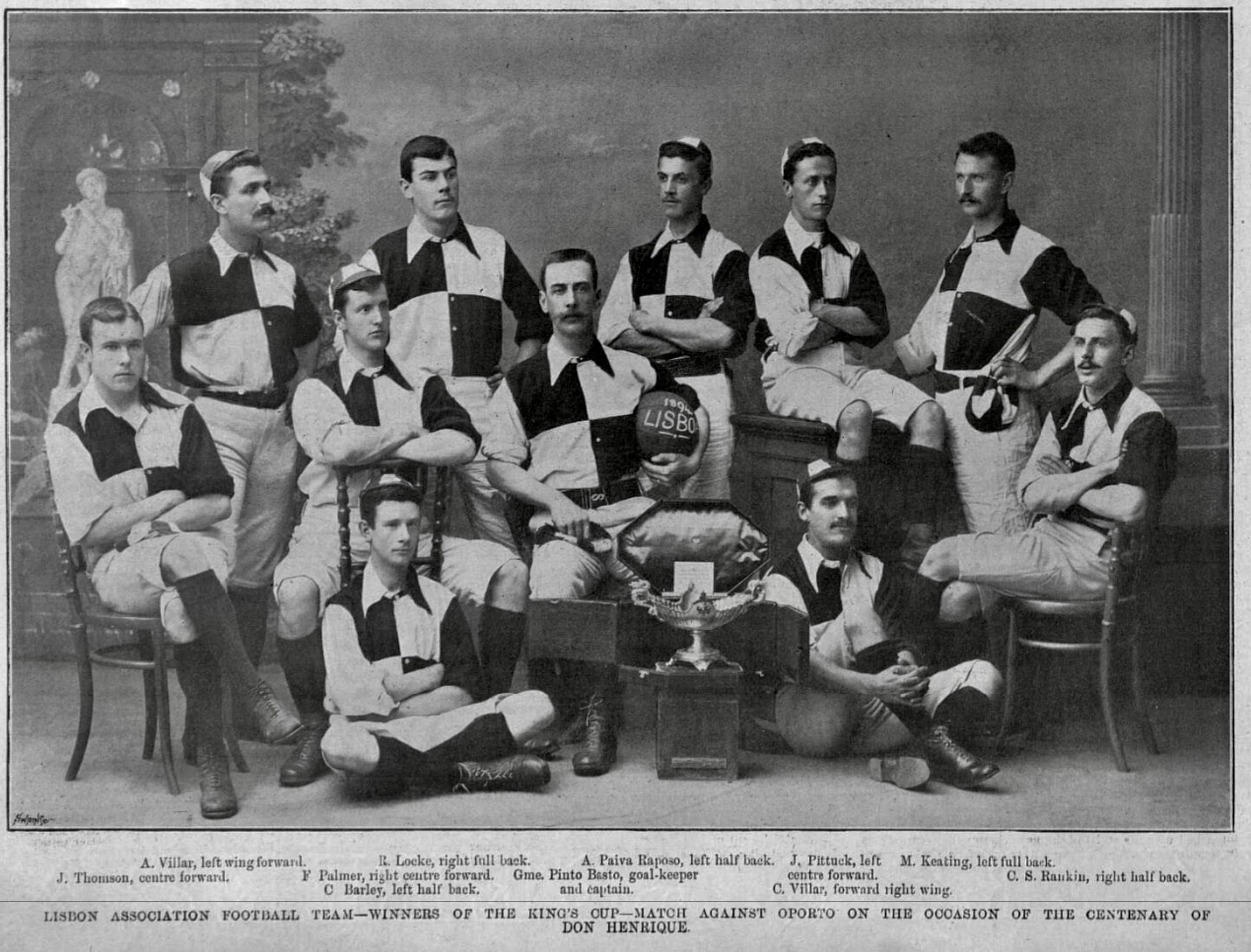
Lisbon Association Football Team with the Portuguese Cup. Illustrated Sporting and Dramatic News, 28 April 1894

On 2 March 1894, Club Lisbonense disputed the Taça D. Carlos I, the first major football event in Portugal and the first football ‘cup’ played on the Iberian Peninsula. The meeting was organized by the then FC Porto president, António Nicolau de Almeida, and by the then Club Lisbonense president, Guilherme Pinto Basto, who managed to have the King Carlos present, who traveled to Porto to witness the event and present a trophy to the winners. And like the King, Club Lisbonense also had to travel to Porto, doing it by train on a journey that took 14 hours. Lisbonense played the game three hours after landing in Campanhã.

Club Lisbonense scored the only goal of the match, securing a 1–0 win, thus becoming the very first Portuguese club to win an official title. The name of the goal scorer does not appear in any chronicle. It is only known that the Vilar brothers (Afonso and Carlos), C.D. Rankin, and Arthur Paiva Raposo contributed to Lisbon's victory, and that the game was refereed by Guilherme's brother, Eduardo. The team that lined-up that day was: Guilherme Pinto Basto; M. Keating, R. Locke; C.D. Rankin, Clyde de Barley, Paiva Raposo; F. Palmer, Carlos Villar, J. Pittuck, Afonso Villar and J. Thomson. At that time, Lisbonense had three black players in its ranks: Alfredo Silva, Pascoal and Valentim Machado. Pascoal was the star, and quickly won the title of Portugal's first-best player.

King Carlos, his wife Queen Amélia, and the princes only arrived towards the end of the match, and at the request of Her Majesty the Queen, the game continued for another 10 minutes because she was enjoying it so much, having previously established that it would not have any influence on the result of the match. Because of this, the 1894 Taça D. Carlos I is possibly the first match in which extra-time was played on the Iberian Peninsula, and maybe even one of the first to do so in continental Europe. The patronage and sponsorship of the King were pivotal to attract a significant number of spectators, as football was practically an unknown sport in Portugal at the time.

=== Decline and Collapse ===
The failed attempts to reorganize Club Lisbonense and Grupo Estrela paved the way for the appearance of the Club Internacional de Foot-ball (CIF) on 8 December 1902, which become the first Portuguese club to play abroad, defeating Madrid Fútbol Clube in 1907 in Madrid. CIF also briefly functioned as an association, organizing the first leagues in the country.

== Colours ==
The club wore black and white quartered shirts, white knickers, and black stockings.

== Honours ==
- Taça D. Carlos I
  - Champions (1): 1894
