= Sporting Club of Cascais =

Defunct sports club for the elite in Portugal

- Sporting Club de Cascais
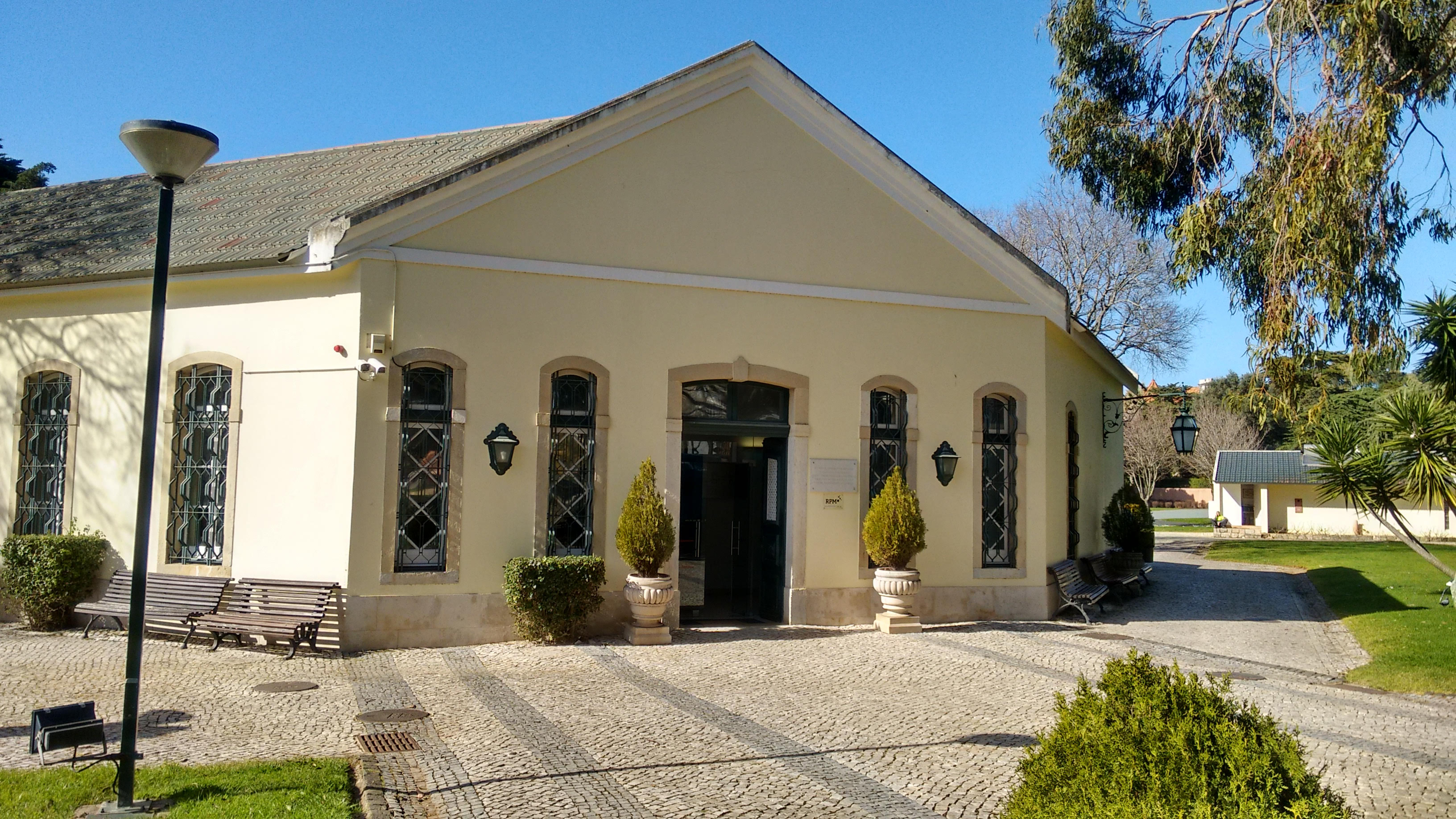
- Former club house, now the Museum of the Sea
- Formation: October 15, 1879; 146 years ago
- Founder: Prince Carlos of Portugal, later King Carlos I of Portugal
- Founded at: Cascais, Portugal
- Type: Social and athletic club
- Legal status: Closed 1974
- Coordinates: 38.6953°N 9.4234°W

The Sporting Club of Cascais (Portuguese: Sporting Club de Cascais) was an elite sports and recreational society in Cascais in the Lisbon District of Portugal.

== History ==
The Club was formed on October 15, 1879, occupying the former parade grounds of the nearby Citadel of Cascais, and became known as the ‘Parade’. Enjoying patronage by King Luis and King Carlos, it was a very elite club, patronised by those who wanted to be and could afford to be close to the Royal Family, which, by 1879, was spending part of its annual summer holidays in the town.

On December 31, 1904, the club's General Assembly unanimously approved its conversion into a Limited Liability Company. In June 1910 it was renamed as the Royal Sporting Club of Cascais, although “Royal” was soon rapidly removed following the establishment of the Portuguese Republic in October 1910. The club closed down in 1974. Its documentation is retained in the Cascais Municipal Archives, held at the nearby Casa Sommer. After closure the building first housed a nursery and a nursery school. In 1978 it was designated as the site for a new Museum of the Sea, which was opened in 1992. Part of the grounds of the Club, including the former tennis courts, were used in 2009 for the Casa das Histórias Paula Rego, a gallery devoted to the works of the Anglo-Portuguese artist, Paula Rego.

== Members ==
All early members were from “well-known families” and access by other social classes was virtually impossible. This would only change with the establishment of the Republic and, even so, only slowly. Members included foreign ambassadors who felt it necessary to be close to the King when he was absent from Lisbon, as well as politicians such as Fontes Pereira de Melo, Henrique de Barros Gomes, António de Serpa Pimentel, José Dias Ferreira and Francisco Joaquim Ferreira do Amaral. The military was represented by Hermenegildo Capelo and Henrique Mitchell de Paiva Couceiro, while writers included Camilo Castelo Branco and Edgar Prestage, Britain's leading authority on Portuguese history and literature. Among businessmen and bankers were Jorge O’Neill. The photographer, Joshua Benoliel, was also a member.

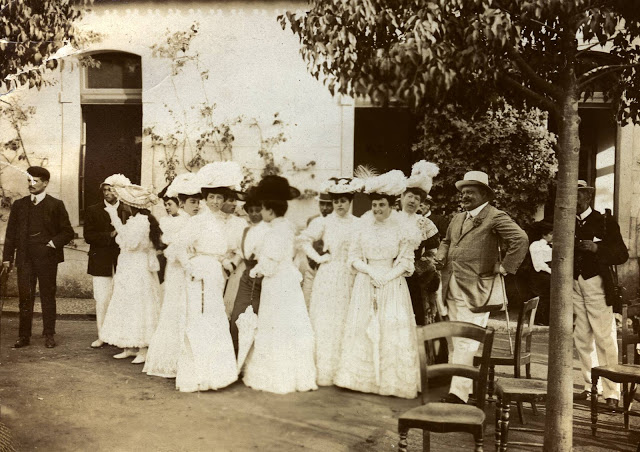
King Carlos at the Cascais Sporting Club

== Sporting activities ==
The club organised tennis games, archery, and pigeon shooting, as well as charity parties. Its importance was noted by the writer Ramalho Ortigão who in October 1888 wrote that “The Sporting Club [...] has given [Cascais] an air of civilization . . . . . . . . . Several garden games have been properly established and are regularly attended.” The club played a leading role in popularising both tennis and football (soccer) in Portugal. This was mainly due to one of its members, Guilherme Pinto Basto, known as the father of Portuguese tennis, who acted as the tennis coach, introducing the game to club members, including Prince Carlos, from around 1882. International tennis tournaments were organised from 1902, with guests including the six-time Wimbledon Ladies singles winner, Blanche Bingley. These became the International Championships of Portugal, and were held at the Cascais club from 1902 to 1973. Participants included the British player, Noel Turnbull, who had won a gold medal at the 1920 Olympic Games and the Spaniard Manuel Alonso Areizaga.

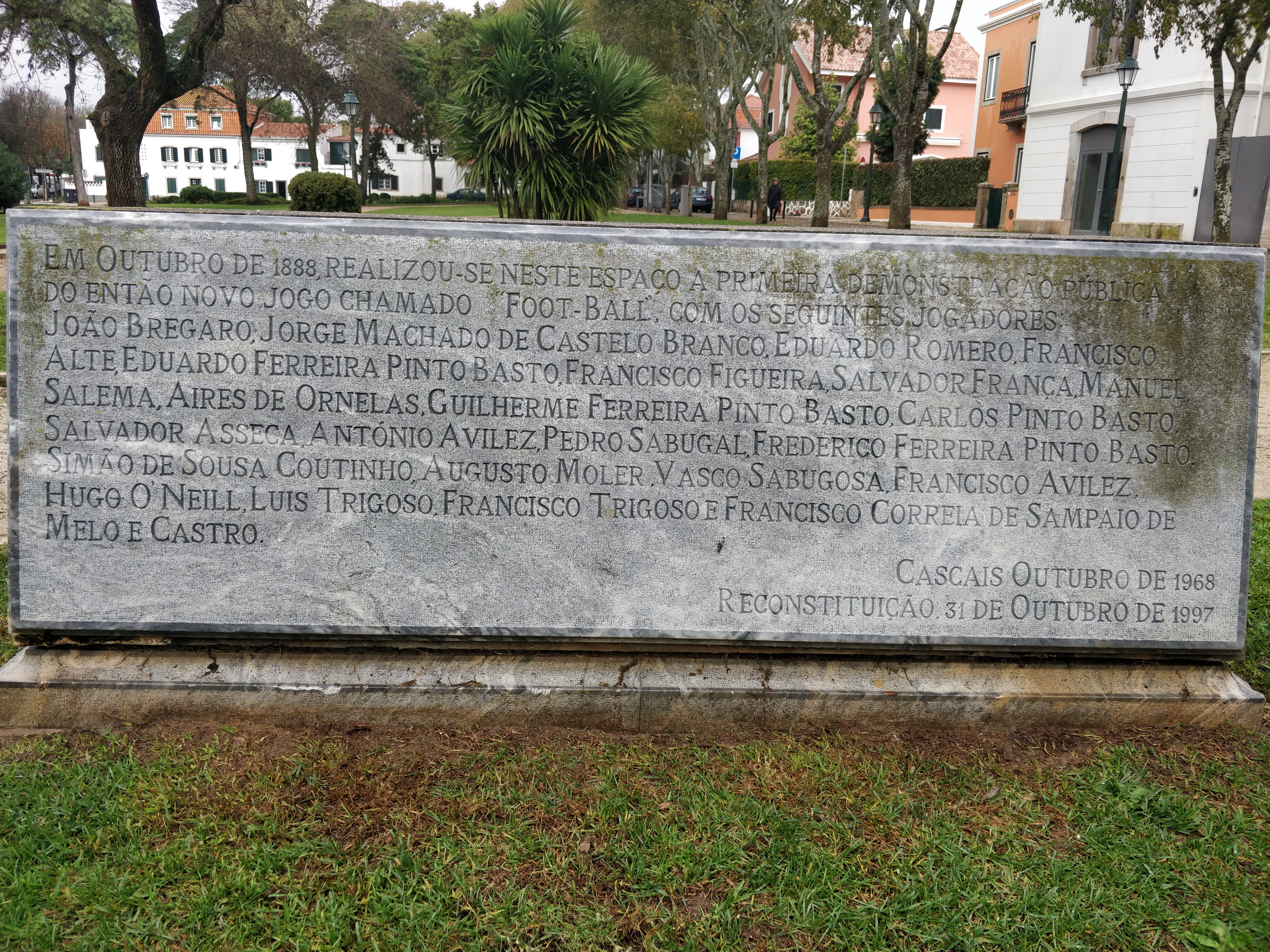
A memorial to the first football (soccer) match played on mainland Portugal in Cascais in October 1888

The first recorded football game in Portugal was in Madeira in 1875. Guilherme Pinto Basto and the Cascais Club organised the first game on the Portuguese mainland thirteen years later. This was played as an exhibition on the former parade grounds in October 1888. Those taking part included four members of the Pinto Basto family, including Guilherme. His brothers, Eduardo and Frederico, brought the ball back from England, where they were studying. A plaque now records the event.
