= Citadel of Cascais =

15th to 17th century fortifications in Cascais, Portugal

- Cidadela de Cascais
- Cascais, Lisbon District, Portugal

Site information
- Type: Bastion fort
- Open to the public: Yes
- Condition: Restored, with areas converted to a hotel and an Arts Centre (Cidadela Art District)

Location
- Coordinates: 38°41′36″N 9°25′11″W

Site history
- Built: 1488-; 1594-; 1648-
- In use: To the present
- Materials: Basalt

The Citadel of Cascais is a set of fortifications built between the 15th and 17th centuries to defend the Cascais coastline and River Tagus estuary and to protect against attacks on the capital of Portugal, Lisbon. The citadel incorporates three separate developments, the tower of Santo António de Cascais, the Fortress of Our Lady of Light (Nossa Senhora da Luz de Cascais), and the former Royal Palace area. It serves as an official summer residence for the President of Portugal.

== History ==
The first construction of a fort on the site was between 1410 and 1415. Improvements to this were deemed necessary as the Cascais Bay was constantly threatened by the English. In 1488 a medieval-style tower at the tip of the Point of Salmodo, to the southwest of the Bay, was begun under the orders of King John II of Portugal. The fort, known as the Torre de Santo António de Cascais, was designed to share, with artillery ships and two other fortresses, resistance to possible military attack on Lisbon. The other forts were the Belém Tower and the Fort of São Sebastião de Caparica, which are approximately opposite each other on the River Tagus closer to Lisbon. Construction of the fort of Nossa Senhora da Luz de Cascais was ordered by Philip I to provide further reinforcements. It began in 1594, designed by an Italian, Captain Fratino, following an unusual triangular design that took advantage of the existing Torre de Santo António de Cascais, which is incorporated as one of three bastions built into the Citadel. The fortress had an interior courtyard that allowed communication between the three bastions and access to the batteries, barracks and cisterns. Reinforcement and enlargement of the Citadel was subsequently carried out around 1648, under the control of John IV. The structure underwent further modifications and repairs until 1755, when it suffered considerable damage as a result of the Lisbon earthquake.

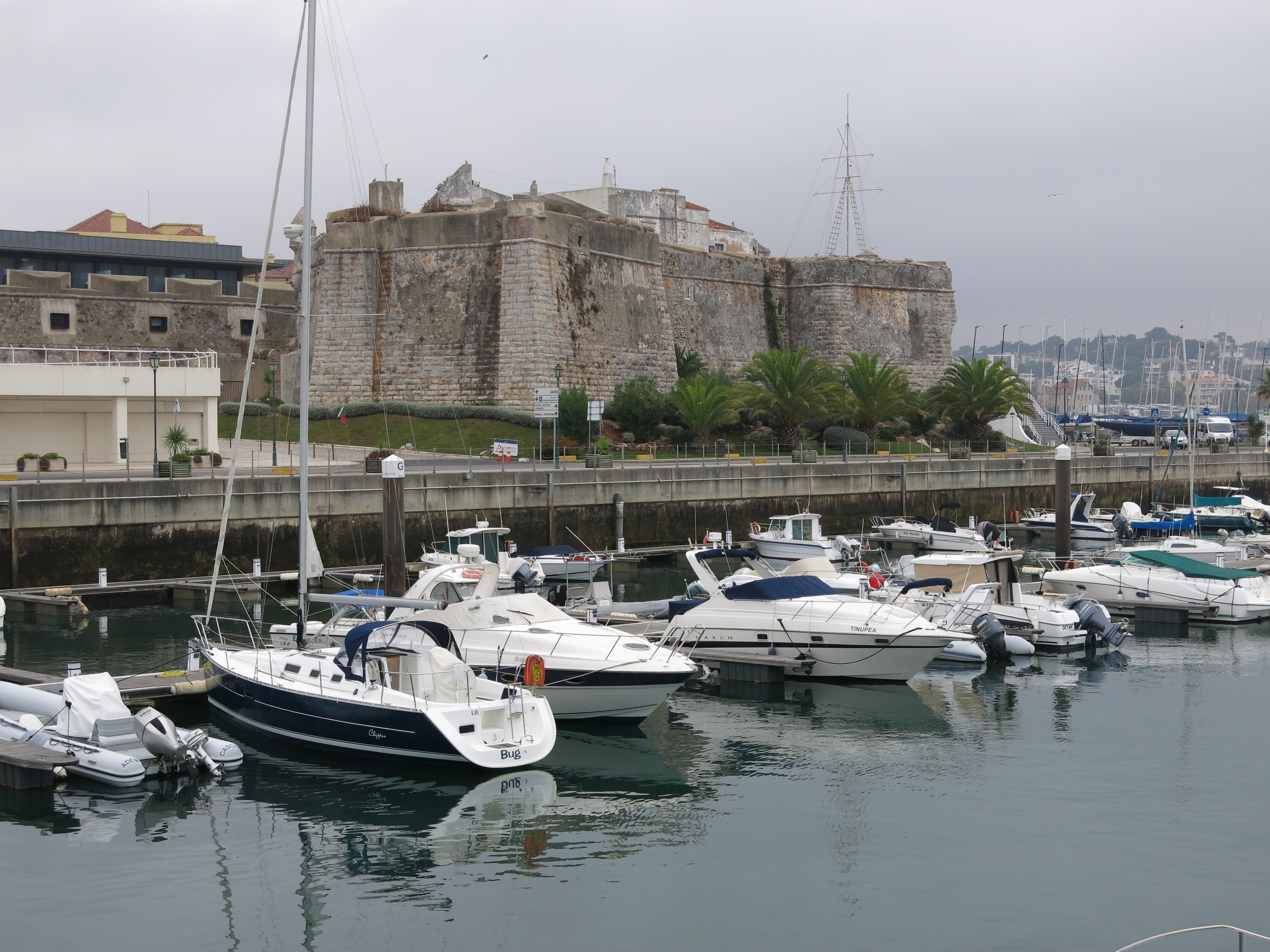
View of the Citadel from the Marina

== Present day ==
In the nineteenth century, Luís I of Portugal ordered the adaptation of the citadel to become a place of rest and retreat for the royal family and nobility and the royal palace area (now a museum) was constructed. Until the regicide of Carlos I in 1908, the royal family spent the months of September and October in Cascais. This led to the growth of Cascais as an important location for affluent people from Lisbon to spend the summer. In 1878 the complex was equipped with the first electric lights in Portugal. Through a Decree in 1977, the complex was classified as Property of Public Interest. Since then it has been restored and incorporated into the modern design of the surrounding areas, providing an impressive backdrop for the new Cascais Marina. A hotel has been built into the Citadel buildings, which also now house an Arts Centre (Cidadela Arts District).

== See also ==
- List of forts
- Portuguese forts

== Gallery ==
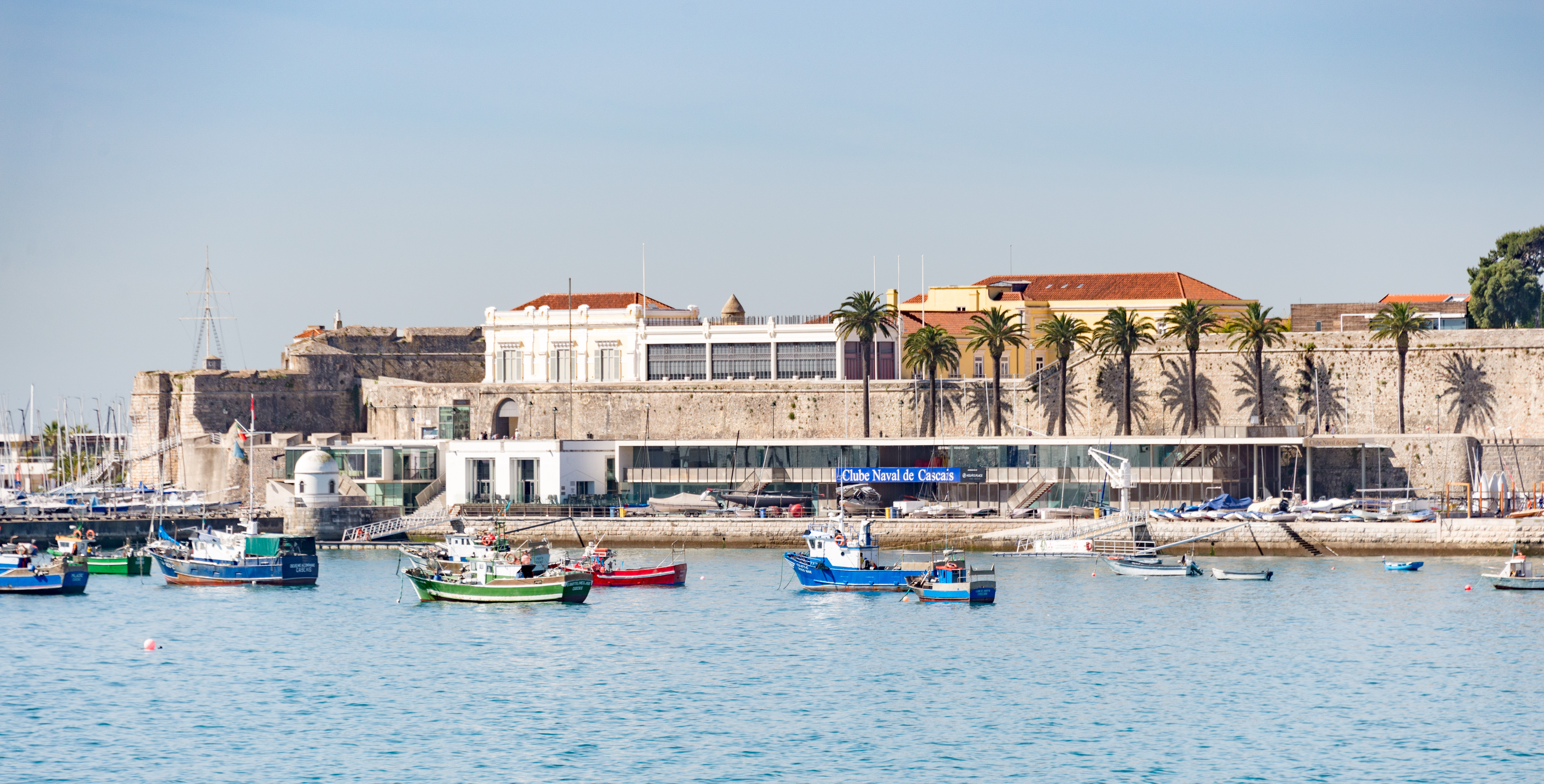
The citadel and marina seen from Cascais Bay

Citadel bastion and statue of King Carlos I on the Dona Maria Pia Promenade

Landward wall of the citadel with a sentry box

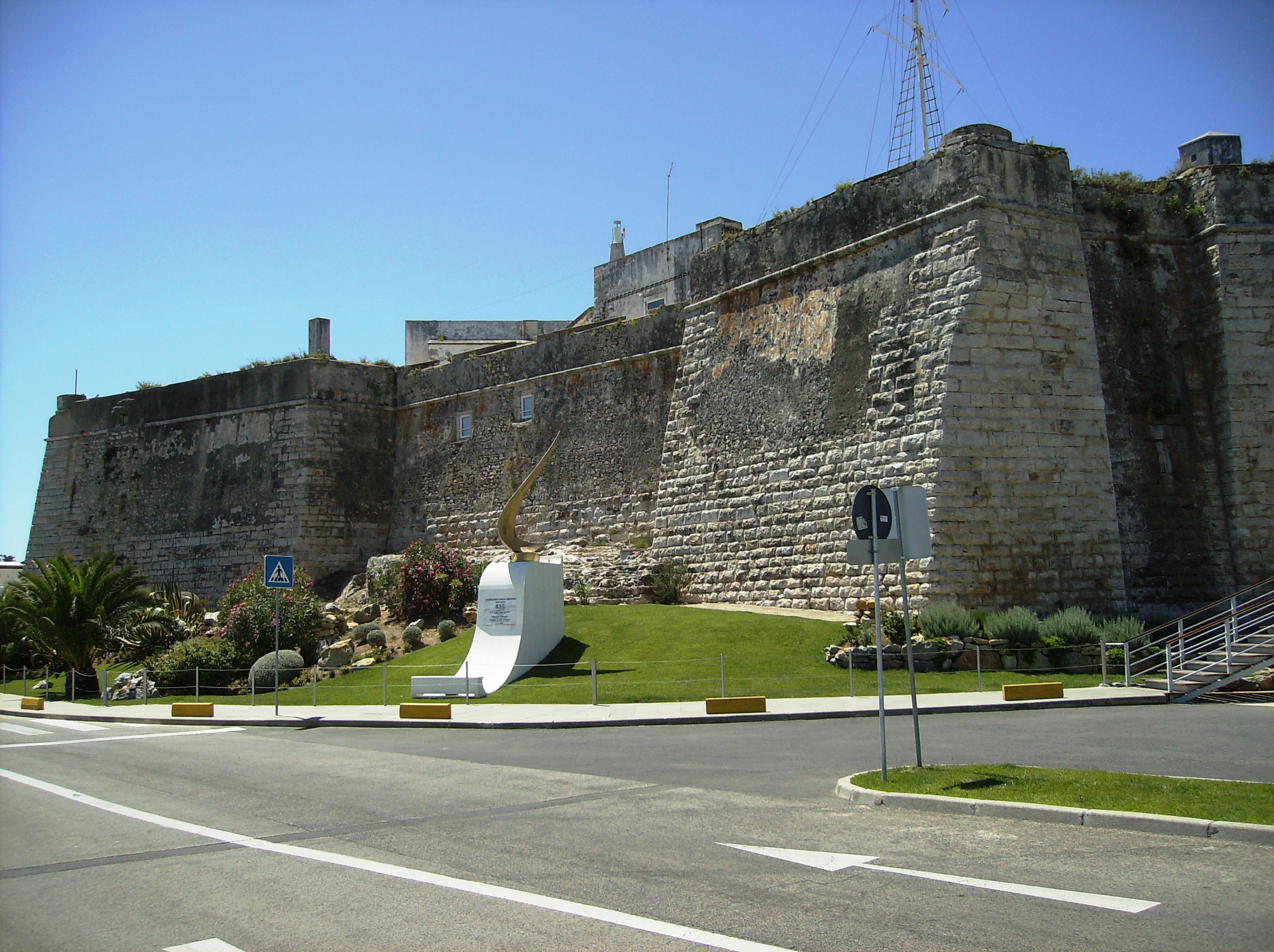
Fortress of Our Lady of Light

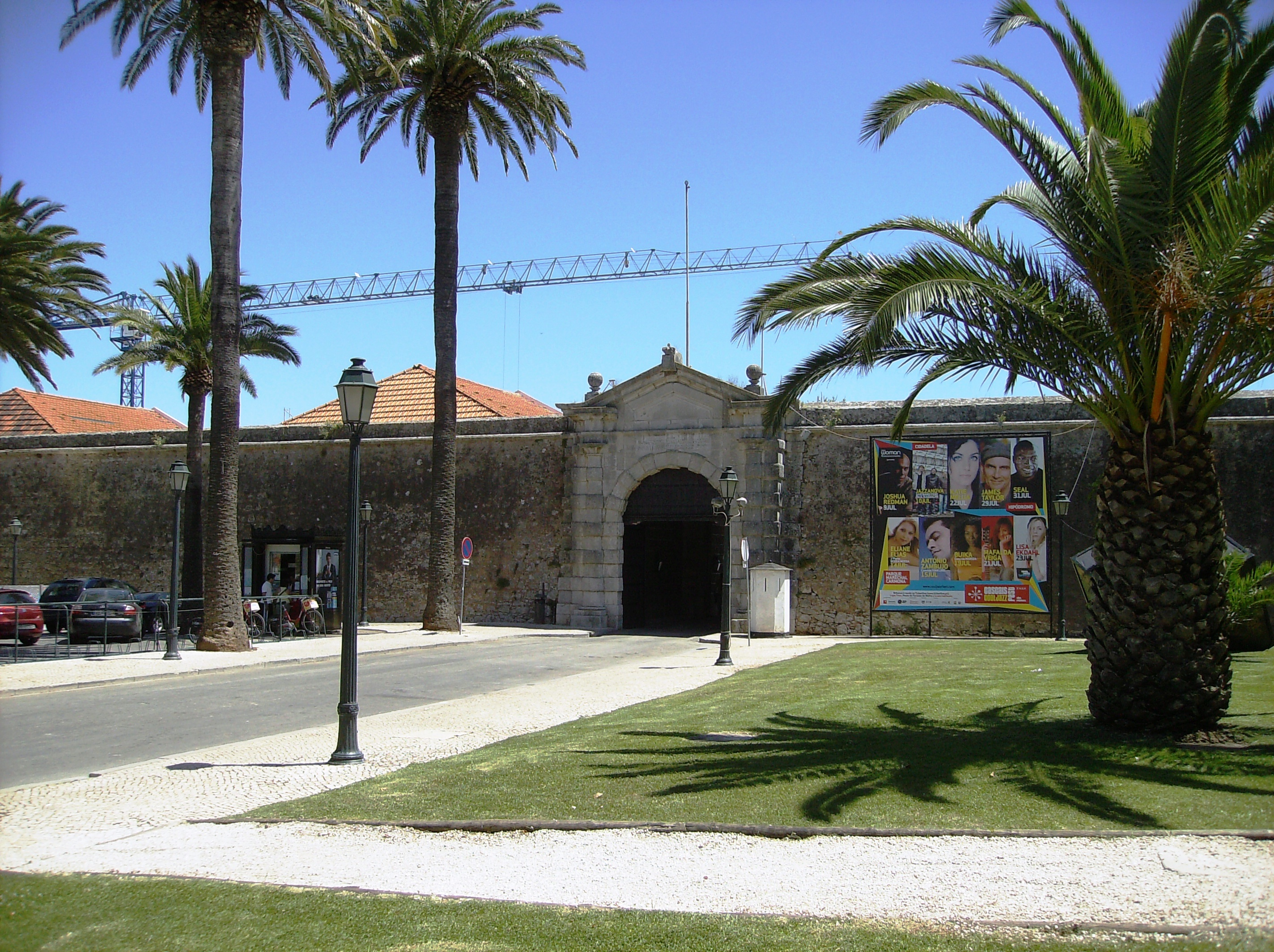
Main gate of the citadel

Monument to the 19th Infantry Regiment beside the citadel wall

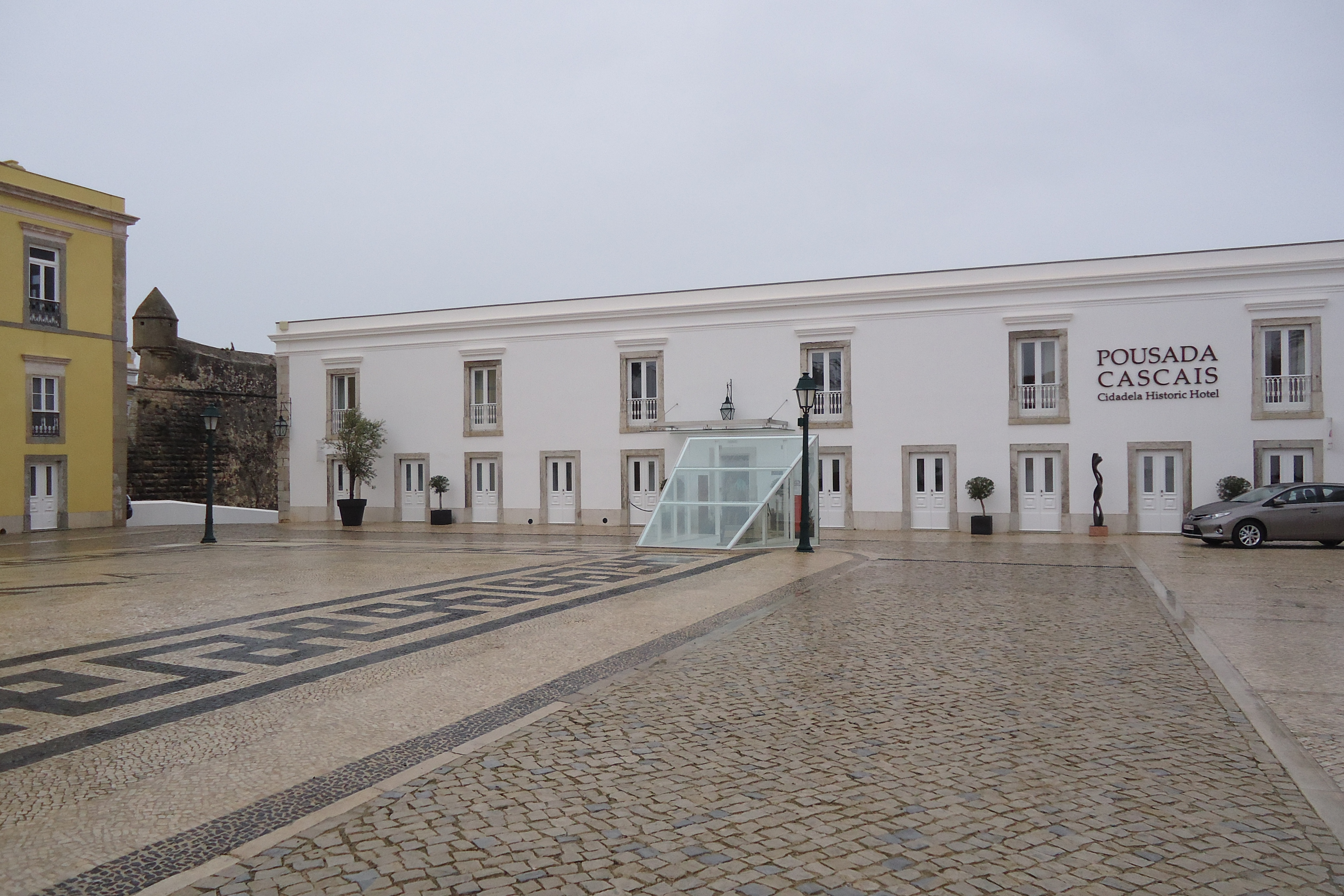
Parade ground and façade of the pousada hotel
