= 1944–45 S.L. Benfica season =

Benfica
1944–45 season
- President: Augusto da Fonseca Júnior (until 18 January 1945); Félix Bermudes
- Head coach: János Biri
- Stadium: Estádio da Luz
- Primeira Divisão: 1st
- Taça de Portugal: Semi-Final
- Campeonato de Lisboa: 2nd
- Top goalscorer: League: Rogério Pipi (16); All: Teixeira (37)
- Biggest win: CUF 1–8 Benfica (1 October 1944); Benfica 9–2 CUF (5 November 1944); Benfica 11–3 Salgueiros (14 January 1945); Benfica 9–1 Salgueiros (22 April 1945)
- Biggest defeat: Salgueiros 4–2 Benfica (15 April 1945)
Home colours	Away colours

The 1944–45 season was Sport Lisboa e Benfica's 41st season in existence and the club's 11th consecutive season in the top flight of Portuguese football, covering the period from 1 September 1944 to 30 June 1945. Benfica competed in the Primeira Divisão, the Taça de Portugal and in the Campeonato de Lisboa.

Benfica entered the season seeking to defend the Taça de Portugal and reclaim both the league title and the Campeonato de Lisboa. After finishing runners-up in the regional championship, the team excelled in the national league, securing its sixth Primeira Divisão title with a three-point advantage over its rivals. In the Taça de Portugal, Benfica reached the semi-finals, where they were eliminated by Sporting after a three-match tie.

== Season summary ==
Benfica entered the season aiming to defend the Taça de Portugal title won in the previous campaign, as well as to reclaim both the league championship and the Campeonato de Lisboa. Hungarian coach János Biri remained in charge for his sixth consecutive year at the club. During the off-season, the squad was reinforced with the arrivals of Félix Antunes and Francisco Moreira.

The team opened its Campeonato de Lisboa campaign with a 6–3 victory over Estoril Praia, followed by wins against Atlético and CUF. These results set up two decisive early fixtures. First, Benfica hosted Belenenses, losing 1–0, and one week later contested the first Derby de Lisboa of the season, falling 3–2 to Sporting. With these consecutive defeats, the team dropped to third place, three points behind the league leaders.

The team responded with three consecutive victories over Estoril Praia, Atlético and CUF, scoring a total of 15 goals. Benfica followed this run with a 4–2 away win against Belenenses, entering the final matchday two points behind Sporting. In a decisive title encounter, Benfica travelled to face Sporting, losing 2–1 and finishing the competition in second place.

Benfica opened its league campaign with a 2–0 win over Estoril Praia, followed by another victory before visiting Sporting in the Derby de Lisboa, where they won 2–0 to move level on points with Olhanense at the top of the table. In the following matchday, the team travelled to face Belenenses, securing a 3–1 victory. Benfica closed the year with a home draw against Olhanense and a 4–3 away defeat to Porto, but still finished the year in first place, one point ahead of Porto.

The new year began with an 8–3 away victory over Vitória de Setúbal, with Espírito Santo scoring a hat-trick. The team then added further wins against Salgueiros and Vitória de Guimarães, scoring 13 goals across the two matches, before dropping points in a 1–1 draw with Estoril Praia, ending January still in first place, holding a two-point lead.

Benfica began February with a 6–2 victory over Académica, followed by a 4–1 home win against Sporting. However, a 2–1 home defeat to Belenenses in the next matchday reduced the team’s lead to a single point over its opponent. Benfica closed the month with a 3–1 win against Olhanense.

On 18 March, Benfica hosted Porto in the second O Clássico of the season, securing a 7–2 victory, and maintaining a one-point lead. A Belenenses defeat in the 15th matchday, followed by Benfica's 7–2 win over Vitória de Setúbal, extended Benfica’s advantage to three points with two matches remaining. A 6–0 victory against Salgueiros secured the league title, and the team concluded the campaign with a win over Vitória de Guimarães, finishing three points clear at the top.

After securing the league title, Benfica turned its attention to the Taça de Portugal, beginning with a round-of-16 tie against Salgueiros. The team lost the first leg 4–2, but overturned the deficit with a 9–1 victory in the second leg. In the quarter-finals, Benfica defeated Belenenses 7–1 in the first leg, before losing 5–4 in the return match, advancing on aggregate. In the semi-finals, a 2–1 away win over Sporting gave Benfica the advantage, but a 3–2 home defeat in the second leg forced a play-off. The decisive match was played on Sporting’s home ground, where Benfica was eliminated following a 1–0 loss.

== Competitions ==
Win Draw Loss Postponed

=== Overall record ===
Competition	First match	Last match	Record								
Competition	First match	Last match	G	W	D	L	GF	GA	GD	Win %	Source
Primeira Divisão	26 November 1944	8 April 1945	18	14	2	2	79	26	+53	77.78	
Taça de Portugal	15 April 1945	27 June 1945	7	3	0	4	26	16	+10	42.86	
Campeonato de Lisboa	17 September 1944	19 November 1944	10	7	0	3	41	18	+23	70.00	
Total			35	24	2	9	146	60	+86	68.57	

=== Primeira Divisão ===
==== League table ====
Pos	Team	Pld	W	D	L	GF	GA	GD	Pts
1	Benfica (C)	18	14	2	2	79	26	+53	30
2	Belenenses	18	13	1	4	72	29	+43	27
3	Sporting CP	18	13	1	4	57	37	+20	27
4	Porto	18	9	2	7	64	48	+16	20
5	Vitória de Setúbal	18	9	1	8	44	49	−5	19

(C) Champions

==== Results by round ====
Round	1	2	3	4	5	6	7	8	9	10	11	12	13	14	15	16	17	18
Ground	H	H	A	A	H	A	A	H	A	A	A	H	H	A	H	H	A	H
Result	W	W	W	W	D	L	W	W	W	D	W	W	L	W	W	W	W	W
Position	3	1	1	1	1	1	1	1	1	1	1	1	1	1	1	1	1	1

Source: ForaDeJogo
A = Away; H = Home; W = Win; D = Draw; L = Loss

==== Matches ====
26 November 1944 1	Benfica	2–0	Estoril Praia	Lisbon
	Espírito Santo 20'; Ferreira 47'			Stadium: Estádio do Campo Grande; Referee: Domingos Godinho

3 December 1944 2	Benfica	6–1	Académica	Lisbon
	Costa 25' (pen.), 77', 80'; Julinho 40', 60'; Arsénio 75'		5' Lemos	Stadium: Estádio do Campo Grande; Referee: Domingos Miranda

10 December 1944 3	Sporting	0–2	Benfica	Lisbon
			4' Julinho; 70' Arsénio	Stadium: Stadium de Lisboa; Referee: Domingos Godinho

17 December 1944 4	Belenenses	1–3	Benfica	Lisbon
	Correia 41'		25' Arsénio; 54' Teixeira; 68' Julinho	Stadium: Campo das Salésias; Referee: Anísio Morgado

24 December 1944 5	Benfica	2–2	Olhanense	Lisbon
	Pipi 1'; Julinho 55'		42' Moreira; 57' Cabrita	Stadium: Estádio do Campo Grande

31 December 1944 6	Porto	4–3	Benfica	Porto
	Catolino 1', 28'; Araújo 68', 76'		40' Espírito Santo; 65' Teixeira; 69' Pipi	Stadium: Estádio do Lima; Referee: Augusto Pacheco

7 January 1945 7	Vitória de Setúbal	3–8	Benfica	Setúbal
	Rodrigues 15', 21', 35'		6', 75' Julinho; 49', 55', 62' Espírito Santo; 78' Arsénio; 79' Pipi; 87' Brito	Stadium: Campo dos Arcos

14 January 1945 8	Benfica	11–3	Salgueiros	Lisbon
	Julinho 6', 58', 83', 89'; Arsénio 11', 22'; Luiz 28', 29'; Espírito Santo 61'; Teixeira 66', 82'		20', 86' Renato; 75' Oliveira	Stadium: Estádio do Campo Grande; Referee: Carlos Canuto

21 January 1945 9	Vitória de Guimarães	1–2	Benfica	Guimarães
	Ferraz 4'		65' Teixeira; 74' Espírito Santo	Stadium: Campo do Benlhevai

28 January 1945 10	Estoril Praia	1–1	Benfica	Lisbon
	Vieira 46'		75' Pipi	Stadium: Estádio do Campo Grande

4 February 1945 11	Académica	2–6	Benfica	Coimbra
	Nini 1'; Lemos 20'		6', 26', 75' Pipi; 20', 54' Julinho; 39' (o.g.) Correia

11 February 1945 12	Benfica	4–1	Sporting	Lisbon
	Teixeira 32'; Pipi 42'; Julinho 48'; Arsénio 74'		8' (red card) 83' Barrosa	Stadium: Estádio do Campo Grande

18 February 1945 13	Benfica	1–2	Belenenses	Lisbon
	Teixeira 83'		38', 87' Correia	Stadium: Estádio do Campo Grande

25 February 1945 14	Olhanense	1–3	Benfica	Olhão
	Paulo 31'		3', 59' Espírito Santo; 48' Arsénio; 77' Pipi	Stadium: Estádio Padinha

18 March 1945 15	Benfica	7–2	Porto	Lisbon
	Pipi 21'; Rui 28'; Guilhar 40' (o.g.); Espírito Santo 72'; Arsénio 78'; Teixeira 81', 86'		63', 80' Araújo	Stadium: Estádio do Campo Grande; Referee: Augusto Pacheco

25 March 1945 16	Benfica	7–2	Vitória de Setúbal	Lisbon
	Rui 15'; Arsénio 25'; Teixeira 30', 38', 85', 89'; Espírito Santo 75'		10' Rodrigues; 55' (o.g.) Pinto	Stadium: Estádio do Campo Grande

1 April 1945 17	Salgueiros	0–6	Benfica	Porto
			11' Espírito Santo; 20' Rui; 23', 35', 75' Pipi; 28' Teixeira

8 April 1945 18	Benfica	5–0	Vitória de Guimarães	Lisbon
	Pipi 2' (pen.), 24', 72'; Arlindo 77' (o.g.); Rui 89'			Stadium: Estádio do Campo Grande

=== Taça de Portugal ===
==== Round of 16 ====
15 April 1945; First leg	Salgueiros	4–2	Benfica	Porto
	Renato 10', 70', 82'; Paulista 68'		8' Mário Rui; 74' Ferreira	Stadium: Estádio Engenheiro Vidal Pinheiro; Referee: Alfredo Sério

22 April 1945; Second leg	Benfica	9–1 (11–5 agg.)	Salgueiros	Lisbon
	Espírito Santo 5' 46'; Teixeira 10'; Ferreira 15'; Arsénio; Pipi			Stadium: Estádio do Campo Grande; Referee: Paulo de Oliveira

==== Quarter-Finals ====
3 June 1945; First leg	Benfica	7–1	Belenenses	Lisbon
	Pipi 28', 88'; Julinho 47'; Arsénio 48'; Teixeira 77', 85'		2' Coelho	Stadium: Estádio do Campo Grande; Referee: Paulo de Oliveira

10 June 1945; Second leg	Os Belenenses	5–4 (6–11 agg.)	Benfica	Lisbon
	Silva 16', 64'; Pedro 30', 68'; Armando 31'		42', 66' Julinho; 74' Teixeira; 86' Arsénio	Stadium: Estádio José Manuel Soares

==== Semi-Finals ====
17 June 1945; First leg	Sporting	1–2	Benfica	Lisbon
	Correia 78'		3' Alcobia; 30' Julinho	Stadium: Stadium de Lisboa; Referee: Carlos Canuto

24 June 1945; Second leg	Benfica	2–3	Sporting	Lisbon
	Espírito Santo 41'; Ferreira 90'		88' Teixeira	Stadium: Estádio do Campo Grande; Referee: Vieira da Costa

27 June 1945; Play-off	Sporting	1–0 (5–4 agg.)	Benfica	Lisbon
	Albano 67'			Stadium: Stadium de Lisboa; Referee: Carlos Canuto

=== Campeonato de Lisboa ===
Pos	Team	Pld	W	D	L	GF	GA	GD	Pts
1	Sporting (C)	10	8	2	0	28	17	+11	28
2	Benfica	10	7	0	3	41	18	+23	24
3	Belenenses	10	5	1	4	23	20	+3	21
4	Estoril Praia	10	3	2	5	23	31	−8	18
5	CUF	10	2	1	7	20	40	−20	15
6	Atlético	10	1	2	7	20	29	−9	14

(C) Champions

17 September 1944 1	Benfica	6–3	Estoril Praia	Lisbon
	Espírito Santo 11'; Arsénio 18'; Teixeira 26', 32', 48', 89'		76' Petrak	Stadium: Estádio do Campo Grande; Referee: Andrade Pinto

24 September 1944 2	Atlético	1–5	Benfica	Lisbon
			5' 40' Teixeira; 45' Pipi	Stadium: Campo de Santo Amaro; Referee: Domingos Godinho

1 October 1944 3	CUF	1–8	Benfica	Lisbon
			Costa; Pipi; Silva; Espírito Santo; Teixeira	Stadium: Campo Bairro Padre Cruz; Referee: António Serrano

8 October 1944 4	Benfica	0–1	Belenenses	Lisbon
			50' Correia	Stadium: Estádio do Campo Grande; Referee: Filipe Gameiro Pereira

15 October 1944 5	Benfica	2–3	Sporting	Lisbon
	Teixeira 48'; Ferreira 58'		4', 77' Peyroteo; 55' Gomes	Stadium: Estádio do Campo Grande; Referee: Andrade Pinto

22 October 1944 6	Estoril Praia	1–3	Benfica	Estoril
			1', 5' Pires; 13' Teixeira	Stadium: Estádio António Coimbra da Mota; Referee: Domingos Godinho

29 October 1944 7	Benfica	3–2	Atlético	Lisbon
	Teixeira 20'; Ferreira 22'; Pires 49'		46' Rosário	Stadium: Estádio da Tapadinha; Referee: José Serandezes

5 November 1944 8	Benfica	8–2	CUF	Lisbon
	Teixeira 43'; Julinho; Espírito Santo		35' (o.g.) Pinto	Stadium: Estádio do Campo Grande; Referee: Carlos Canuto

12 November 1944 9	Belenenses	2–4	Benfica	Lisbon
			14' Pipi; 23', 81' Teixeira; 88' Espírito Santo	Stadium: Estádio José Manuel Soares; Referee: Domingos Godinho

19 November 1944 10	Sporting	1–2	Benfica	Lisbon
	Canário 13'; Peyroteo 79'		27' Julinho	Stadium: Stadium de Lisboa; Referee: Andrade Pinto

=== Non-Official matches ===
10 September 1944; Viseu City Cup	Benfica	3–4	Porto	Viseu
				Stadium: Estádio do Fontelo

5 October 1944	Vitória de Setúbal	1–1	Benfica	Setúbal
	Pereira 87'		14' Espírito Santo	Stadium: Campo dos Arcos; Referee: Cunha Pinto

1 December 1944; Farewell to Valadas	Benfica	4–5	Mixed XI	Lisbon
	Julinho; Jordão; Rogério		Peyroteo; Palma Soeiro; Micael; Soeiro	Stadium: Estádio do Campo Grande

1 January 1945	Vila Real	5–8	Benfica	Vila Real
				Stadium: Campo do Calvário; Attendance: 4000

26 February 1945	Sport Lagos e Benfica	1–10	Benfica	Lagos
				Stadium: Campo Rossio Trindade

2 April 1945	Varzim	2–2	Benfica	Póvoa do Varzim
				Stadium: Estádio do Varzim SC

29 April 1945	Barreirense	2–1	Benfica	Barreiro
				Stadium: Campo do Rossio

13 May 1945; Francisco Albino Cup	Benfica	1–3	Sporting	Lisbon
				Stadium: Estádio do Campo Grande

14 May 1945	CD Onze Unidos	1–3	Benfica	Montijo
				Stadium: Campo Luís Almeida Fidalgo

20 May 1945	Benfica	1–1	Barreirense	Lisbon
				Stadium: Stadium de Lisboa; Referee: Mário Ribeiro Santos

27 May 1945	Évora Mixed XI	2–5	Benfica	Évora
				Stadium: Campo Estrela

== Player statistics ==
The squad for the season consisted of the players listed in the tables below, as well as staff member János Biri (manager).

Note 1: Note: Flags indicate national team as defined under FIFA eligibility rules. Players may hold more than one non-FIFA nationality.

Note 2: Players with squad numbers marked ‡ joined the club during the 1944-45 season via transfer, with more details in the following section.

No.	Pos	Nat	Player	Total		Primeira Divisão		Taça de Portugal		Campeonato de Lisboa	
No.	Pos	Nat	Player	Apps	Goals	Apps	Goals	Apps	Goals	Apps	Goals
1	GK	(Portugal) POR	António Martins	14	0	5	0	1	0	8	0
1	GK	(Portugal) POR	Mário da Rosa	21	0	13	0	6	0	2	0
	DF	(Portugal) POR	Artur Teixeira	1	0	1	0	0	0	0	0
	DF	(Portugal) POR	César Ferreira	12	0	2	0	0	0	10	0
	DF	(Portugal) POR	Félix Antunes	1	0	1	0	0	0	0	0
	DF	(Portugal) POR	José Climaco	3	0	3	0	0	0	0	0
	DF	(Portugal) POR	Mário Galvão	2	0	0	0	1	0	1	0
2	DF	(Portugal) POR	Gaspar Pinto	27	0	18	0	6	0	3	0
3	DF	(Portugal) POR	Eduardo Cerqueira	21	0	13	0	7	0	1	0
	MF	(Portugal) POR	António Carvalho	6	0	0	0	0	0	6	0
	MF	(Portugal) POR	Guia Costa	2	0	2	0	0	0	0	0
	MF	(Portugal) POR	Jacinto Marques	4	0	1	0	2	0	1	0
	MF	(Portugal) POR	João Silva	11	1	5	0	0	0	6	1
	MF	(Portugal) POR	Joaquim Alcobia	6	1	0	0	6	1	0	0
	MF	(Portugal) POR	Manuel Jordão	4	0	3	0	1	0	0	0
4	MF	(Portugal) POR	Francisco Albino	16	0	9	0	0	0	7	0
5	MF	(Portugal) POR	Francisco Moreira	26	0	16	0	4	0	6	0
6	MF	(Portugal) POR	Francisco Ferreira	34	6	18	1	7	3	9	2
	FW	(Portugal) POR	Carlos Brito	2	1	1	1	1	0	0	0
	FW	(Portugal) POR	Francisco Pires	2	3	0	0	0	0	2	3
	FW	(Portugal) POR	José Luiz	1	2	1	2	0	0	0	0
	FW	(Portugal) POR	Manuel da Costa	10	4	2	3	0	0	8	1
7	FW	(Portugal) POR	Espírito Santo	31	20	16	11	5	4	10	5
7	FW	(Portugal) POR	Mário Rui	8	5	5	4	3	1	0	0
8	FW	(Portugal) POR	Arsénio Duarte	30	16	17	10	7	5	6	1
9	FW	(Portugal) POR	Julinho	24	22	13	14	6	4	5	4
10	FW	(Portugal) POR	Joaquim Teixeira	34	37	17	14	7	5	10	18
11	FW	(Portugal) POR	Rogério Pipi	32	24	16	16	7	3	9	5

== Transfers ==
=== In ===
Position	Player	From	Fee	Ref
DF	Félix Antunes	C.F. Os Unidos	Undisclosed	
MF	Francisco Moreira	Barreirense	Undisclosed	

=== Out ===
Position	Player	From	Fee	Ref
DF	Chico Vitória	Portimonense S.C.	Undisclosed	
FW	Cascais	Naval 1º de Maio	Undisclosed	
FW	Miguel Lourenço	Estoril Praia	Undisclosed	
