= 1942–43 S.L. Benfica season =

Benfica
1942–43 season
- President: Augusto da Fonseca Júnior
- Head coach: János Biri
- Stadium: Estádio da Luz
- Primeira Divisão: 1st
- Taça de Portugal: Winner
- Campeonato de Lisboa: 2nd
- Top goalscorer: League: Julinho (24); All: Julinho (37)
- Biggest win: Benfica 12–2 Porto (7 February 1943)
- Biggest defeat: Vitória de Guimarães 5–1 Benfica (28 March 1943)
Home colours	Away colours

The 1942–43 season was Sport Lisboa e Benfica's 39th season in existence and the club's 9th consecutive season in the top flight of Portuguese football, covering the period from 1 September 1942 to 30 June 1943. Benfica competed in the Primeira Divisão, the Taça de Portugal and in the Campeonato de Lisboa.

Benfica entered the season as defending league champions and went on to secure its fifth Primeira Divisão title under Hungarian coach János Biri. Despite finishing second in the Campeonato de Lisboa, the team produced a strong league campaign, highlighted by a record 12–2 win over Porto and decisive victories against title rivals Sporting CP and Belenenses. Benfica completed the season by winning the Taça de Portugal for the second time, defeating Vitória de Setúbal 5–1 in the final, completing the first league and cup double in the club's history.

== Season summary ==
Benfica entered the season seeking to defend its league title, as well as to reclaim both the Taça de Portugal and the Campeonato de Lisboa, competitions it had been unable to win in the previous two campaigns. Hungarian coach János Biri remained in charge for his fourth year at the club. During the off-season, Francisco Rodrigues, the club's top scorer in the previous three seasons, with 99 goals in 88 matches, departed for Vitória de Setúbal. Francisco Elói also left for Estoril Praia, while Julinho joined from Académico and Rogério Pipi arrived from Chelas.

Before the start of the Campeonato de Lisboa, Benfica played four friendlies, drawing three and losing one. The team opened the regional championship with a 5–1 win over Atlético. In the following matchday, Benfica dropped points in a 3–3 draw with Os Unidos, but responded with an 8–1 victory over Os Fósforos. On 1 November, Benfica hosted Sporting in the first Derby de Lisboa of the season, winning 4–1 and moving into first place, level on points with Belenenses. The team followed up this result with a 4–1 loss to Belenenses, and three wins, scoring 15 goals, but remaining tied on points with both Belenenses and Sporting.

In the ninth matchday, Benfica visited Sporting in a decisive championship match, losing 3–2 and consequently needing both rivals to drop points in the final round. In the last matchday, a 3–0 victory over Belenenses secured second place for Benfica in the regional competition. The team closed the year with three preparation matches ahead of the Primeira Divisão, winning two and losing one.

Benfica began its league title defense with a 3–2 win over Os Unidos, and followed this result with three additional victories, scoring twelve goals and finishing January in first place, level on points with Belenenses. In the opening match of February, Benfica hosted Porto in the season's first O Clássico, winning 12–2. Valadas and Teixeira each scored twice, while Julinho netted five goals, marking the largest margin of victory in Clássico history. The team maintained its form with wins over Belenenses and Leixões, but closed the month with a 3–2 loss to Sporting, though still finishing February at the top of the table with a two-point lead.

Benfica opened March with three consecutive victories, scoring twelve goals, but on the 28th a 5–1 defeat to Vitória de Guimarães reduced the team's lead to a single point. A 7–1 win over CUF and, on 11 April, a 4–2 away victory against Porto, allowed Benfica to retain its advantage at the top. However, a 5–2 away loss to Belenenses dropped the team to third place, one point behind the leader Sporting.

The team began May with a 4–2 away win over Leixões, followed a week later by a decisive 2–1 victory over Sporting in the Derby de Lisboa. With this result, Benfica climbed back into first place and moved within reach of the league title. A 4–3 away win against Académica in the following match secured Benfica's fifth league championship.

After securing the league title, the team entered the Taça de Portugal, beginning with a 7–1 victory over Vitória de Guimarães in the round of 16. A 5–2 win against Os Unidos in the quarter-finals qualified Benfica for the semi-finals, setting up the fifth Derby de Lisboa of the season. A 3–2 away win in the semi-final, with Francisco Pires scoring twice, sent Benfica through to the final. On 20 June, Benfica faced Vitória de Setúbal in the final, winning 5–1 with Julinho scoring a brace, and completing the first league and cup double in the club's history.

== Competitions ==
Win Draw Loss Postponed

=== Overall record ===
Competition	First match	Last match	Record								
Competition	First match	Last match	G	W	D	L	GF	GA	GD	Win %	Source
Primeira Divisão	10 January 1943	16 May 1943	18	15	0	3	74	38	+36	83.33	
Taça de Portugal	30 May 1943	20 June 1943	4	4	0	0	20	6	+14	100.00	
Campeonato de Lisboa	11 October 1942	13 December 1942	10	7	1	2	41	16	+25	70.00	
Total			32	26	1	5	135	60	+75	81.25	

=== Primeira Divisão ===
==== League table ====
Pos	Team	Pld	W	D	L	GF	GA	GD	Pts
1	Benfica (C)	18	15	0	3	74	38	+36	30
2	Sporting CP	18	14	1	3	66	37	+29	29
3	Belenenses	18	14	0	4	78	20	+58	28
4	Unidos de Lisboa	18	9	2	7	70	46	+24	20
5	Olhanense	18	8	2	8	44	48	−4	18

Source: rsssf.com
(C) Champions

==== Results by round ====
Round	1	2	3	4	5	6	7	8	9	10	11	12	13	14	15	16	17	18
Ground	A	A	H	A	H	H	H	A	H	H	H	A	H	A	A	A	H	A
Result	W	W	W	W	W	W	W	L	W	W	W	L	W	W	L	W	W	W
Position	4	3	2	2	2	1	1	1	2	1	1	1	1	1	3	2	1	1

Source: ForaDeJogo
A = Away; H = Home; W = Win; D = Draw; L = Loss

==== Matches ====
10 January 1943 1	Os Unidos	2–3	Benfica	Lisbon
			25' Galvão; 55' Julinho; 63' Nelo	Stadium: Campo Bairro Padre Cruz

17 January 1943 2	Olhanense	0–1	Benfica	Lisbon
			42' Teixeira	Stadium: Estádio Padinha

24 January 1943 3	Benfica	8–3	Vitória de Guimarães	Lisbon
	Julinho 12', 57', 65', 71', 73'; Costa 24', 35'; Nelo 61'		13', 81', 85' Alexandre	Stadium: Estádio do Campo Grande

31 January 1943 4	CUF	2–3	Benfica	Barreiro
	Luís 49', 70'		22' Brito; 43' Teixeira; 60' Valadas	Stadium: Campo de Santa Bárbara

7 February 1943 5	Benfica	12–2	Porto	Lisbon
	Valadas 5', 31'; Teixeira 38', 85'; Costa 44' (pen.), 58'; Pais 46' (pen.); Julinho 55', 60', 61', 75'; Ferreira 77'		48' Póvoas; (red card) 64' Nunes; 67' Araújo	Stadium: Estádio do Campo Grande; Referee: Vasco Ataíde

14 February 1943 6	Benfica	4–2	Belenenses	Lisbon
	Jordão 41'; Julinho 57'; Costa 70' (pen.), 83'		44' Rafael Correia; 88' Feliciano	Stadium: Estádio do Campo Grande

21 February 1943 7	Benfica	3–0	Leixões	Lisbon
	Costa 9', 12'; Conceição 41'			Stadium: Estádio do Campo Grande

28 February 1943 8	Sporting	3–2	Benfica	Lisbon
	Cruz 39'; Mourão 66'; Peyroteo 75'		33', 52' Julinho	Stadium: Stadium de Lisboa

7 March 1943 9	Benfica	6–2	Académica	Lisbon
	Teixeira 10', 24', 35', 55'; Pinto 71' (pen.); Julinho 78'		18' Nini; 49' Gomes; (red card) 82' Antunes	Stadium: Estádio do Campo Grande

14 March 1943 10	Os Unidos	5–2	Benfica	Lisbon
	Ferreira 22'; Teixeira 34'; Julinho 38', 53'; Nelo 68'			Stadium: Estádio do Campo Grande

21 March 1943 11	Benfica	3–1	Olhanense	Lisbon
	Pires 35'; Julinho 44'; Teixeira 82'		62' Salvador	Stadium: Estádio do Campo Grande

28 March 1943 12	Vitória de Guimarães	5–1	Benfica	Guimarães
	Miguel 15'; Ferraz 33', 35'; Alexandre 46'; Arlindo 84'		30' Valadas	Stadium: Campo do Benlhevai

4 April 1943 13	Benfica	7–1	CUF	Lisbon
	Nelo 6', 85'; Julinho 13', 75', 84'; Costa 32'; Valadas 71'		18' Henriques	Stadium: Estádio do Campo Grande

11 April 1943 14	Porto	2–4	Benfica	Porto
	Pratas 43'; Gomes 65'		23' Julinho; 60' (pen.), 85' (pen.) Costa; 64' Nelo	Stadium: Campo da Constituição; Referee: Álvaro Santos

25 April 1943 15	Belenenses	5–2	Benfica	Lisbon
	Quaresma 17'; Pedro 48', 85'; Correia 59'; Franklim 66'		75' Valadas; 82' Nelo	Stadium: Estádio José Manuel Soares; Referee: Abel Ferreira

2 May 1943 16	Leixões	2–4	Benfica	Matosinhos
	Vítor 47', 58'		10' Julinho; 12' Pipi; 20', 49' Valadas	Stadium: Campo de Santana

9 May 1943 17	Benfica	2–1	Sporting	Lisbon
	Julinho 5'; Costa 41'		30' Mourão	Stadium: Estádio do Campo Grande; Referee: Vieira da Costa

16 May 1943 18	Académica	3–4	Benfica	Coimbra
	Nini 67' (pen.); Correia 82'; Lemos 89'		54' Valadas; 63' Julinho; 80' (pen.), 83' Costa	Stadium: Campo de Santa Cruz; Referee: Araújo Correia

=== Taça de Portugal ===
==== Round of 16 ====
30 May 1943	Benfica	7–1	Vitória de Guimarães	Lisbon
	Pipi 18'; Teixeira 30', 71'; Julinho 39', 44', 51'; Nelo 69'		36' Arlindo	Stadium: Estádio do Campo Grande

==== Quarter-Finals ====
6 June 1943	Benfica	5–2	Os Unidos	Lisbon
	Pipi 42'; Pires 46'; Teixeira 48'; Julinho 67', 77'			Stadium: Estádio do Campo Grande; Referee: Carlos Canuto

==== Semi-Finals ====
13 June 1943	Sporting	2–3	Benfica	Lisbon
	Canário 33'; Cruz 50' (pen.)		10', 65' Pires; 44' Teixeira	Stadium: Stadium de Lisboa; Referee: João Vaz

==== Final ====
20 June 1943	Benfica	5–1	Vitória de Setúbal	Lisbon
	Pipi 12'; Costa 23'; Julinho 32', 88'; Armindo 75' (pen.)		58' Amador	Stadium: Estádio José Manuel Soares; Referee: Araújo Correia

=== Campeonato de Lisboa ===
Pos	Team	Pld	W	D	L	GF	GA	GD	Pts
1	Sporting (C)	10	8	1	1	35	17	+18	27
2	Benfica	10	7	1	2	41	16	+25	25
3	Belenenses	10	6	2	2	36	15	+21	24
4	Unidos de Lisboa	10	3	2	5	27	24	+3	18
5	Atlético	10	3	0	7	14	36	−22	16
6	Os Fósforos	10	0	0	10	15	60	−45	10

(C) Champions

11 October 1942 1	Atlético	1–5	Benfica	Lisbon
	Galvão 82' (pen.)		38' Pipi; 46' Galvão; 60' Valadas; 77', 78' Julinho	Stadium: Estádio da Tapadinha; Referee: João Vaz

18 October 1942 2	Benfica	3–3	Os Unidos	Lisbon
	Teixeira 56'; Galvão 75' (pen.); Ferreira 84'			Stadium: Estádio do Campo Grande; Referee: Aurélio de Carvalho

25 October 1942 3	Os Fósforos	1–8	Benfica	Lisbon
			2', 5', 28', 35', 65', 70' Costa; 44' Julinho; 75' Pipi	Stadium: Estádio do Campo Grande; Referee: Carlos Canuto

1 November 1942 4	Benfica	4–1	Sporting	Lisbon
	Pires 15', 35', 71'; Teixeira 61'			Stadium: Estádio do Campo Grande; Referee: João Vaz

8 November 1942 5	Belenenses	1–4	Benfica	Lisbon
	Correia 88'		14' Pipi	Stadium: Estádio José Manuel Soares; Referee: Neves de Carvalho

15 November 1942 6	Benfica	5–2	Atlético	Lisbon
	Teixeira 32', 80'; Brito 45'; Albino 67'; Costa 90'			Stadium: Campo da Tapadinha; Referee: José Andrade Santos

22 November 1942 7	Os Unidos	1–2	Benfica	Lisbon
			29' Costa; 86' Brito	Stadium: Campo Bairro Padre Cruz; Referee: Carlos Canuto

29 November 1942 8	Benfica	8–0	Os Fósforos	Lisbon
	Costa 1'; Julinho 3', 59', 69'; Ferreira 21'; Pipi 30'; Brito 66'; Teixeira 80'			Stadium: Estádio do Campo Grande; Referee: António Ferreira

6 December 1942 9	Sporting	3–2	Benfica	Lisbon
	Mourão 14', 28'; Pireza 67'		13' Costa; 77' Brito	Stadium: Stadium de Lisboa; Referee: João Vaz

13 December 1942 10	Benfica	3–0	Belenenses	Lisbon
	Pipi 7'; Brito 37'; Costa 38' (pen.)			Stadium: Estádio do Campo Grande; Referee: António de Almeida

=== Non-Official matches ===
20 September 1942; B.S.B. Tournament	Benfica	0–1	Belenenses	Lisbon
			72' José Pedro	Stadium: Estádio do Lumiar; Referee: António de Almeida

24 September 1942	Benfica	1–1	C.F. Os Unidos	Lisbon
				Stadium: Campo do 28 de maio

27 September 1942	Benfica	1–1	Vitória de Setúbal	Lisbon
	Jordão 42'		89' Passos	Stadium: Estádio do Campo Grande; Referee: Eduardo Augusto

4 October 1942; Benfica-Belenenses Cup	Benfica	2–2	Belenenses	Lisbon
				Stadium: Campo das Salésias

20 December 1942; Reconciliation Cup	Atlético	6–5	Benfica	Lisbon
	Gregorio 2' (pen.); Lopes 30'; 40', 90' Marques; 44' Lopes II; 63' Armando		1' Brito; 8' Valadas; 15' Pires; 33' Melo	Stadium: Estádio da Tapadinha

25 December 1942; Stadium Cup	Benfica	6–3	Estoril Praia	Lisbon
				Stadium: Estádio do Campo Grande

27 December 1942; End of Year Cup	Benfica	5–4	Belenenses	Lisbon
	Julinho 38'; Costa 42', 78' (pen.); Teixeira 80'		26' Pedro; 83' Frankin; 84', 88' (pen.) Amaro	Stadium: Estádio do Campo Grande; Referee: Henrique Leal

1 January 1943; End of Year Cup	Belenenses	3–1	Benfica	Lisbon
				Stadium: Campo das Salésias

3 May 1943	Gil Vicente	2–7	Benfica	Barcelos
				Stadium: Estádio Adelino Ribeiro Novo

17 May 1943	Viseu	2–8	Benfica	Viseu
				Stadium: Estádio do Fontelo

== Player statistics ==
The squad for the season consisted of the players listed in the tables below, as well as staff member János Biri (manager).

Note 1: Note: Flags indicate national team as defined under FIFA eligibility rules. Players may hold more than one non-FIFA nationality.

Note 2: Players with squad numbers marked ‡ joined the club during the 1942–43 season via transfer, with more details in the following section.

No.	Pos	Nat	Player	Total		Primeira Divisão		Taça de Portugal		Campeonato de Lisboa	
No.	Pos	Nat	Player	Apps	Goals	Apps	Goals	Apps	Goals	Apps	Goals
1	GK	(Portugal) POR	António Martins	32	0	18	0	4	0	10	0
	DF	(Portugal) POR	Mário Galvão	8	3	4	1	0	0	4	2
	DF	(Portugal) POR	Ricardo Freire	3	0	0	0	0	0	3	0
2	DF	(Portugal) POR	Gaspar Pinto	32	1	18	1	4	0	10	0
3	DF	(Portugal) POR	César Ferreira	22	0	13	0	4	0	5	0
	DF	(Portugal) POR	António Carvalho	1	0	1	0	0	0	0	0
	MF	(Portugal) POR	Guia Costa	1	2	1	2	0	0	0	0
4	MF	(Portugal) POR	Manuel Jordão	14	1	5	1	3	0	6	0
5	MF	(Portugal) POR	Francisco Albino	29	1	18	0	1	0	10	1
5	MF	(Portugal) POR	Joaquim Alcobia	23	0	15	0	4	0	4	0
6	MF	(Portugal) POR	Francisco Ferreira	29	4	17	2	4	0	8	2
	FW	(Portugal) POR	Carlos Brito	7	6	2	1	0	0	5	5
	FW	(Portugal) POR	Dário Rodrigues	2	0	0	0	0	0	2	0
	FW	(Portugal) POR	Guilherme Espírito Santo	0	0	0	0	0	0	0	0
	FW	(Portugal) POR	José da Conceição	2	1	2	1	0	0	0	0
	FW	(Portugal) POR	Nelo Barros	15	8	14	7	1	1	0	0
7	FW	(Portugal) POR	Manuel da Costa	26	24	14	12	4	1	8	11
8	FW	(Portugal) POR	Francisco Pires	10	7	4	1	3	3	3	3
9	FW	(Portugal) POR	Julinho	30	37	16	24	4	7	10	6
10	FW	(Portugal) POR	Joaquim Teixeira	29	19	15	10	4	4	10	5
11	FW	(Portugal) POR	Alfredo Valadas	15	10	13	9	0	0	2	1
11	FW	(Portugal) POR	Rogério Pipi	22	9	8	1	4	3	10	5

== Transfers ==
=== In ===
Position	Player	From	Fee	Ref
MF	Manuel Jordão	Barreirense	Undisclosed	
FW	Dário Rodrigues	Monção	Undisclosed	
FW	Julinho	Académico F.C.	Undisclosed	
FW	Rogério Pipi	Chelas	Undisclosed	

=== Out ===
Position	Player	To	Fee	Ref
DF	Francisco Elói	Estoril Praia	Undisclosed	
FW	Francisco Rodrigues	Vitória de Setúbal	Undisclosed	
