= 1943–44 S.L. Benfica season =

Benfica
1943–44 season
- President: Augusto da Fonseca Júnior
- Head coach: János Biri
- Stadium: Estádio da Luz
- Primeira Divisão: 2nd
- Taça de Portugal: Winners
- Taça Império: Runners-Up
- Campeonato de Lisboa: 2nd
- Top goalscorer: League: Teixeira (14); All: Julinho (31)
- Biggest win: Benfica 8–0 Estoril Praia (28 May 1944)
- Biggest defeat: Belenenses 4–2 Benfica (17 October 1943); Atlético 3–1 Benfica (9 January 1944)
| Home colours | Away colours |

The 1943–44 season was Sport Lisboa e Benfica's 40th season in existence and the club's 10th consecutive season in the top flight of Portuguese football, covering the period from 1 September 1943 to 30 June 1944. Benfica competed in the Primeira Divisão, the Taça de Portugal and in the Campeonato de Lisboa.

Benfica entered the season aiming to defend its league and Taça de Portugal titles and to reclaim the Campeonato de Lisboa. Despite a competitive campaign under fifth-year Hungarian coach János Biri, the team finished runners-up in both the regional championship and the national league, falling behind Sporting in the decisive stages. Success came in the Taça de Portugal, where Benfica claimed the trophy for a second consecutive year, with a 8–0 win over Estoril Praia in the final. The season concluded with a 3–2 extra-time defeat to Sporting in the Taça Império.

== Season summary ==
Benfica entered the season aiming to defend both the league championship and the Taça de Portugal, as well as to reclaim the Campeonato de Lisboa. Hungarian coach János Biri remained in charge for his fifth year at the club. During the off-season, the team strengthened its attack with the arrival of goalscorer Arsénio Duarte.

The team opened its Campeonato de Lisboa campaign with a 5–3 away victory over Os Unidos, followed by a 5–0 win against Os Fósforos. On 3 October, Benfica travelled to face Sporting in the Derby de Lisboa, earning a 2–2 draw. The team responded with a 6–2 victory over Atlético, but on the fifth matchday it was surprised by a 4–2 defeat to Belenenses, dropping to third place, three points behind its opponent.

Benfica responded with two further victories, scoring a total of 11 goals, and on 7 November hosted Sporting in the second Derby of the season, winning 4–3. A 2–2 draw against Atlético in the following matchday effectively handed the title to Belenenses, whom Benfica defeated 2–1 in the subsequent round. The team concluded the regional championship in second place.

Benfica began its league title defense with a 1–1 draw away to Vitória de Setúbal. The team responded with a victory over Salgueiros, but a 1–1 home draw against Belenenses on the third matchday dropped Benfica to fourth place. In the following round, the team defeated Vitória de Guimarães, before travelling to face Porto in the first O Clássico of the season. Benfica drew 2–2, with comeback goals from Valadas and Julinho, finishing the year in fourth place, two points behind leaders Sporting.

Benfica opened the new year with a win over Académica, but a week later suffered a 3–1 defeat to Atlético, falling three points off first place. In the following week, Benfica hosted Sporting in their first league encounter of the season, winning 5–4 with Joaquim Teixeira scoring four goals, reducing the gap to two points. The team closed the month with a 5–3 victory over Vitória de Setúbal.

In February, the team recorded three wins and a draw, the last of which was a 6–3 victory over Porto, with Manuel da Costa and Joaquim Teixeira each scoring twice. Despite the strong run, Benfica remained two points behind Sporting. In the decisive month of March, the team opened with wins over Académica and Atlético, entering the crucial Derby de Lisboa just one point behind Sporting. In the penultimate matchday, Benfica lost 1–0 away to Sporting, effectively handing the league title to their rivals. The team concluded the league campaign with a 3–2 away defeat to Olhanense, finishing in second place, five points behind Sporting.

Having lost both the regional and national league titles, Benfica entered the Taça de Portugal seeking to defend its trophy. The team began by defeating Luso Beja 8–2 on aggregate in the round of 16. In the quarter-finals, Benfica faced Belenenses, winning 2–1 away and 8–2 at home. A 6–1 home victory in the first leg of the semi-finals against Académica, followed by a 1–1 away draw in the second leg, qualified the team for the final. On 28 May, Benfica defeated Estoril Praia 8–0, with Rogério Pipi scoring five goals, securing its second consecutive Taça de Portugal title.

On 10 June, Benfica faced Sporting in the Taça Império, a predecessor of the modern Supertaça, losing 3–2 after extra time.

== Competitions ==
Win Draw Loss Postponed

=== Overall record ===
| Competition | First match | Last match | Record | | | | | | | | |
| Competition | First match | Last match | G | W | D | L | GF | GA | GD | Win % | Source |
|---|---|---|---|---|---|---|---|---|---|---|---|
| Primeira Divisão | 28 November 1943 | 26 March 1944 | 18 | 11 | 4 | 3 | 57 | 34 | +23 | 61.11 | |
| Taça de Portugal | 16 April 1944 | 28 May 1944 | 7 | 6 | 1 | 0 | 33 | 7 | +26 | 85.71 | |
| Taça Império | 10 June 1944 | | 1 | 0 | 0 | 1 | 2 | 3 | −1 | 0.00 | |
| Campeonato de Lisboa | 19 September 1943 | 21 November 1943 | 10 | 7 | 2 | 1 | 39 | 21 | +18 | 70.00 | |
| Total | | | 36 | 24 | 7 | 5 | 131 | 65 | +66 | 66.67 | |

=== Primeira Divisão ===
==== League table ====
| Pos | Team | Pld | W | D | L | GF | GA | GD | Pts |
|---|---|---|---|---|---|---|---|---|---|
| 1 | Sporting (C) | 18 | 14 | 3 | 1 | 61 | 22 | +39 | 31 |
| 2 | Benfica | 18 | 11 | 4 | 3 | 57 | 34 | +23 | 26 |
| 3 | Atlético | 18 | 9 | 6 | 3 | 51 | 28 | +23 | 24 |
| 4 | Porto | 18 | 10 | 3 | 5 | 46 | 36 | +10 | 23 |
| 5 | Olhanense | 18 | 10 | 2 | 6 | 65 | 34 | +31 | 22 |

Source: rsssf.com
(C) Champions

==== Results by round ====
| Round | 1 | 2 | 3 | 4 | 5 | 6 | 7 | 8 | 9 | 10 | 11 | 12 | 13 | 14 | 15 | 16 | 17 | 18 |
|---|---|---|---|---|---|---|---|---|---|---|---|---|---|---|---|---|---|---|
| Ground | A | A | H | H | A | H | A | H | H | H | H | A | A | H | A | H | A | A |
| Result | D | W | D | W | D | W | L | W | W | W | W | W | D | W | W | W | L | L |
| Position | 5 | 2 | 4 | 4 | 4 | 3 | 4 | 4 | 3 | 4 | 2 | 2 | 2 | 3 | 2 | 2 | 2 | 2 |

Source: ForaDeJogo
A = Away; H = Home; W = Win; D = Draw; L = Loss

==== Matches ====
| 28 November 1943 1 | Vitória de Setúbal | 1–1 | Benfica | Setúbal |
| | Rodrigues 60' | | 15' Silva | Stadium: Campo dos Arcos |

| 5 December 1943 2 | Salgueiros | 1–6 | Benfica | Lisbon |
| | Viana 69' | | 5' Costa; 20', 31'Julinho; 25' Valadas; 40', 60' Teixeira | Stadium: Estádio do Bessa; Referee: Jorge de Vasconcelos |

| 12 December 1943 3 | Benfica | 1–1 | Belenenses | Lisbon |
| | Teixeira 31' | | 4' (pen.) Feliciano | Stadium: Estádio do Campo Grande |

| 19 December 1943 4 | Benfica | 5–1 | Vitória de Guimarães | Lisbon |
| | Arsénio 4'; Adelino 13', 76'; Teixeira 40'; Pipi 58' | | 31' Brioso | Stadium: Estádio do Campo Grande; Referee: José Trindade |

| 26 December 1943 5 | Porto | 2–2 | Benfica | Porto |
| | Pinga 15'; Lourenço 48' | | 75' Valadas; 77' Julinho | Stadium: Estádio do Lima; Referee: José Lira |

| 2 January 1944 6 | Benfica | 2–1 | Académica | Lisbon |
| | Costa 11'; Julinho 28' | | 65' Micael | Stadium: Estádio do Campo Grande |

| 9 January 1944 7 | Atlético | 3–1 | Benfica | Lisbon |
| | Catinana 3', 43'; Jesus 60' | | 49' Julinho | Stadium: Estádio da Tapadinha |

| 16 January 1944 8 | Benfica | 5–4 | Sporting | Lisbon |
| | Teixeira 24', 55', 72', 89'; Julinho 74' | | 18' (pen.) Martins; 50' Peyroteo; 77' Albano; 84' Mourão | Stadium: Estádio do Campo Grande; Referee: Carlos Canuto |

| 23 January 1944 9 | Benfica | 5–4 | Olhanenses | Lisbon |
| | Costa 12'; Arsénio 20'; Julinho 45', 50'; Teixeira 80' | | 23', 84' Palmeiro; 60' Moreira; 68' Salvador | Stadium: Estádio do Campo Grande |

| 30 January 1944 10 | Benfica | 5–3 | Vitória de Setúbal | Lisbon |
| | Teixeira 22'; Pipi 44', 55', 90'; Montês 53' (pen.) | | 45', 78' Rodrigues; 79' Nunes | Stadium: Estádio do Campo Grande |

| 6 February 1944 11 | Benfica | 6–1 | Salgueiros | Lisbon |
| | Julinho 18', 53', 82', 87'; Teixeira 42', 83' | | 59' Renato | Stadium: Estádio do Campo Grande |

| 13 February 1944 12 | Belenenses | 1–2 | Benfica | Lisbon |
| | Franklim 49' | | 5' Pires; 7' Julinho |

| 20 February 1944 13 | Vitória de Guimarães | 2–2 | Benfica | Guimarães |
| | César Ferreira 18' (pen.); Miguel 51' | | 38', 68' Julinho | Stadium: Campo do Benlhevai |

| 27 February 1944 14 | Benfica | 6–3 | Porto | Lisbon |
| | Costa 15', 82' (pen.); Teixeira 30', 62'; Julinho 32'; Pipi 40' | | 3', 59' Correia Dias; 33' Araújo | Stadium: Estádio do Campo Grande; Referee: Paulo de Oliveira |

| 5 March 1944 15 | Académica | 1–4 | Benfica | Coimbra |
| | Micael 57'; Silva (red card) 60' | | 5' Costa; 12', 18', 68' Pires; (red card) 60' Teixeira |

| 12 March 1944 16 | Benfica | 2–1 | Atlético | Lisbon |
| | Costa 43'; Pires 85' | | 58' Catinana | Stadium: Estádio do Campo Grande |

| 19 March 1944 17 | Sporting | 1–0 | Benfica | Lisbon |
| | Peyroteo 43' | | | Stadium: Stadium de Lisboa; Referee: Vieira da Costa |

| 26 March 1944 18 | Olhanense | 3–2 | Benfica | Olhão |
| | Vieira 36'; Silva 76' (pen.); Salvador 78' | | 8' Espírito Santo; 68' Valadas | Stadium: Estádio Padinha |

=== Taça de Portugal ===
==== Round of 16 ====
| 16 April 1944; First leg | Luso Beja | 1–4 | Benfica | Beja |
| | | | 8' Valadas; 46' Arsénio; 76' Ferreira |

| 23 April 1944; Second leg | Benfica | 4–1 (8–2 agg.) | Luso Beja | Lisbon |
| | Julinho 20', 75', 82'; Valadas 43' | | | Stadium: Estádio do Campo Grande |

==== Quarter-Finals ====
| 30 April 1944; First leg | Belenenses | 1–2 | Benfica | Lisbon |
| | Quaresma 85' | | 38' Teixeira; 80' Julinho | Stadium: Estádio do Campo Grande |

| 7 May 1944; Second leg | Benfica | 5–2 (7–3 agg.) | Os Belenenses | Lisbon |
| | Julinho 12', 76', 89'; Pipi 58', 65'; Arsénio 73'; Teixeira 81'; Espírito Santo 87' | | 2', 75' Correia | Stadium: Estádio do Campo Grande; Referee: Carlos Canuto |

==== Semi-Finals ====
| 14 May 1944 | Benfica | 6–1 | Académica | Lisbon |
| | Julinho 40', 84'; Teixeira 43', 77', 86'; Pipi 83' | | 1' Lemos | Stadium: Estádio do Campo Grande; Referee: Vieira da Costa |

| 21 May 1944 | Académica | 1–1 (2–7 agg.) | Benfica | Coimbra |
| | Micael 1' | | 88' Teixeira | Stadium: Estádio Municipal do Fontelo; Referee: João Vaz |

==== Final ====
| 28 May 1944 | Benfica | 8–0 | Estoril Praia | Lisbon |
| | Pipi 13', 56', 69', 75', 86'; Julinho 15', 29'; Arsénio 35' | | | Stadium: Estádio José Manuel Soares; Referee: Carlos Canuto |

=== Taça Império ===
| 10 June 1944 | Sporting | 3–2 | Benfica | Lisbon |
| | Peyroteo 60', 92'; Eliseu 107' | | 77' Espírito Santo; 115' Julinho | Stadium: Estádio Nacional; Attendance: 60000; Referee: Vieira da Costa |

=== Campeonato de Lisboa ===
| Pos | Team | Pld | W | D | L | GF | GA | GD | Pts |
|---|---|---|---|---|---|---|---|---|---|
| 1 | Belenenses (C) | 10 | 9 | 0 | 1 | 48 | 12 | +36 | 28 |
| 2 | Benfica | 10 | 7 | 2 | 1 | 39 | 21 | +18 | 26 |
| 3 | Sporting | 10 | 5 | 2 | 3 | 28 | 24 | +4 | 22 |
| 4 | Atlético | 10 | 3 | 2 | 5 | 25 | 32 | −7 | 18 |
| 5 | Unidos de Lisboa | 10 | 1 | 1 | 8 | 23 | 41 | −18 | 13 |
| 6 | Os Fósforos | 10 | 1 | 1 | 8 | 15 | 48 | −33 | 13 |

(C) Champions

| 19 September 1943 1 | Os Unidos | 3–5 | Benfica | Lisbon |
| | | | 68' Costa; 70', 76' Julinho; 88' Teixeira; 90' Correia | Stadium: Campo Bairro Padre Cruz |

| 26 September 1943 2 | Benfica | 5–0 | Os Fósforos | Lisbon |
| | Correia 20', 47'; Costa 22' (pen.); Albino 50'; Teixeira 55' | | | Stadium: Estádio do Campo Grande |

| 3 October 1943 3 | Sporting | 2–2 | Benfica | Lisbon |
| | Peyroteo 75', 77' | | 55' Teixeira; 80' Julinho | Stadium: Stadium de Lisboa |

| 10 October 1943 4 | Benfica | 6–2 | Atlético | Lisbon |
| | 35' Pipi; 40', 82' Correia; 41' Teixeira; 72' Valadas; 83' Pires | | | Stadium: Estádio do Campo Grande |

| 17 October 1943 5 | Belenenses | 4–2 | Benfica | Lisbon |
| | Correia 43'; Quaresma 44' | | 5' Teixeira; 88' Valadas | Stadium: Estádio José Manuel Soares; Referee: João Vaz |

| 24 October 1943 6 | Benfica | 5–4 | Os Unidos | Lisbon |
| | Correia 30'; Pipi 32', 53', 90'; Ferreira 81' | | | Stadium: Estádio das Amoreiras; Referee: Domingos Godinho |

| 31 October 1943 7 | Os Fósforos | 0–6 | Benfica | Lisbon |
| | | | 9', 30', 75' Costa; 12' Guia; 42' Valadas; 87' Teixeira | Stadium: Estádio Eng.º Carlos Salema; Referee: Carlos Canuto |

| 7 November 1943 8 | Benfica | 4–3 | Sporting | Lisbon |
| | Valadas 6'; Teixeira 46'; Costa 63'; Julinho 80' | | 27' Marques; 30', 42' Albano | Stadium: Estádio do Campo Grande; Referee: Domingos Godinho |

| 14 November 1943 9 | Atlético | 2–2 | Benfica | Lisbon |
| | Santos 86' | | 1' Costa; 27' Teixeira | Stadium: Estádio da Tapadinha; Referee: Filipe Gameiro |

| 21 November 1943 10 | Benfica | 2–1 | Belenenses | Lisbon |
| | Teixeira 10'; Costa 21'; Pinto (red card) | | 65' Quaresma | Stadium: Estádio do Campo Grande; Referee: Carlos Canuto |

=== Non-official matches ===
| 12 September 1943; Farewell to Antonio Augusto Pires | Chelas | 3–10 | Benfica | Lisbon |

| 1 December 1943; Farewell to Manuel Soeiro | Sporting | 0–3 | Benfica | Lisbon |
| | | | | Stadium: Stadium de Lisboa |

| 27 March 1944 | Sport Faro e Benfica | 0–3 | Benfica |

| 29 March 1944 | Lusitano VRSA | 2–11 | Benfica |

| 3 May 1944 | S.L. Marinha | 1–4 | Benfica | Marinha Grande |
| | | | | Stadium: Campo da Marinha Grande |

| 17 May 1944 | União Almadense | 1–6 | Benfica | Almada |
| | | | | Stadium: Campo das Fontainhas |

| 31 May 1944 | Alcobaça | 2–12 | Benfica |

== Player statistics ==
The squad for the season consisted of the players listed in the tables below, as well as staff member János Biri (manager).

Note 1: Note: Flags indicate national team as defined under FIFA eligibility rules. Players may hold more than one non-FIFA nationality.

Note 2: Players with squad numbers marked ‡ joined the club during the 1943-44 season via transfer, with more details in the following section.

| No. | Pos | Nat | Player | Total | | Primeira Divisão | | Taça de Portugal | | Taça Império | | Campeonato de Lisboa | |
| No. | Pos | Nat | Player | Apps | Goals | Apps | Goals | Apps | Goals | Apps | Goals | Apps | Goals |
|---|---|---|---|---|---|---|---|---|---|---|---|---|---|
| 1 | GK | (Portugal) POR | António Martins | 35 | 0 | 17 | 0 | 7 | 0 | 1 | 0 | 10 | 0 |
| 1 | GK | (Portugal) POR | Mário da Rosa | 1 | 0 | 1 | 0 | 0 | 0 | 0 | 0 | 0 | 0 |
| | DF | (Portugal) POR | Artur Teixeira | 1 | 0 | 1 | 0 | 0 | 0 | 0 | 0 | 0 | 0 |
| | DF | (Portugal) POR | Gaspar Pinto | 11 | 0 | 1 | 0 | 0 | 0 | 0 | 0 | 10 | 0 |
| | DF | (Portugal) POR | Mário Galvão | 6 | 0 | 0 | 0 | 0 | 0 | 0 | 0 | 6 | 0 |
| 2 | DF | (Portugal) POR | César Ferreira | 28 | 0 | 17 | 0 | 7 | 0 | 1 | 0 | 3 | 0 |
| 3 | DF | (Portugal) POR | António Carvalho | 17 | 0 | 9 | 0 | 7 | 0 | 1 | 0 | 0 | 0 |
| | MF | (Portugal) POR | Eduardo Cerqueira | 1 | 0 | 1 | 0 | 0 | 0 | 0 | 0 | 0 | 0 |
| | MF | (Portugal) POR | Guia Costa | 10 | 1 | 8 | 0 | 0 | 0 | 0 | 0 | 2 | 1 |
| | MF | (Portugal) POR | Joaquim Alcobia | 20 | 0 | 11 | 0 | 0 | 0 | 0 | 0 | 9 | 0 |
| | MF | (Portugal) POR | Manuel Jordão | 1 | 0 | 0 | 0 | 0 | 0 | 0 | 0 | 1 | 0 |
| 4 | MF | (Portugal) POR | Jacinto Marques | 5 | 0 | 3 | 0 | 0 | 0 | 1 | 0 | 1 | 0 |
| 4 | MF | (Portugal) POR | João Silva | 15 | 1 | 8 | 1 | 7 | 0 | 0 | 0 | 0 | 0 |
| 5 | MF | (Portugal) POR | Francisco Albino | 34 | 1 | 16 | 0 | 7 | 0 | 1 | 0 | 10 | 1 |
| 6 | MF | (Portugal) POR | Francisco Ferreira | 34 | 2 | 16 | 0 | 7 | 1 | 1 | 0 | 10 | 1 |
| | FW | (Portugal) POR | Adelino Gonçalves | 1 | 2 | 1 | 2 | 0 | 0 | 0 | 0 | 0 | 0 |
| | FW | (Portugal) POR | Carlos Brito | 4 | 0 | 4 | 0 | 0 | 0 | 0 | 0 | 0 | 0 |
| | FW | (Portugal) POR | Dário Rodrigues | 0 | 0 | 0 | 0 | 0 | 0 | 0 | 0 | 0 | 0 |
| | FW | (Portugal) POR | Francisco Pires | 8 | 6 | 6 | 5 | 0 | 0 | 0 | 0 | 2 | 1 |
| | FW | (Portugal) POR | Jaime Correia | 9 | 6 | 3 | 0 | 0 | 0 | 0 | 0 | 6 | 6 |
| | FW | (Portugal) POR | Manuel da Costa | 20 | 15 | 13 | 7 | 0 | 0 | 0 | 0 | 7 | 8 |
| | FW | (Portugal) POR | Mário Rui | 3 | 0 | 0 | 0 | 3 | 0 | 0 | 0 | 0 | 0 |
| | FW | (Portugal) POR | Pessoa Duarte | 0 | 1 | 0 | 1 | 0 | 0 | 0 | 0 | 0 | 0 |
| 7 | FW | (Portugal) POR | Espírito Santo | 8 | 3 | 3 | 1 | 4 | 1 | 1 | 1 | 0 | 0 |
| 8 | FW | (Portugal) POR | Arsénio Duarte | 14 | 5 | 6 | 2 | 7 | 3 | 1 | 0 | 0 | 0 |
| 9 | FW | (Portugal) POR | Julinho | 31 | 32 | 16 | 16 | 7 | 11 | 1 | 1 | 7 | 4 |
| 10 | FW | (Portugal) POR | Joaquim Teixeira | 32 | 29 | 15 | 14 | 6 | 6 | 1 | 0 | 10 | 9 |
| 11 | FW | (Portugal) POR | Rogério Pipi | 28 | 17 | 13 | 5 | 4 | 8 | 1 | 0 | 10 | 4 |
| 11 | FW | (Portugal) POR | Alfredo Valadas | 18 | 9 | 9 | 3 | 3 | 2 | 0 | 0 | 6 | 4 |

== Transfers ==
=== In ===
| Position | Player | From | Fee | Ref |
|---|---|---|---|---|
| FW | Arsénio Duarte | Barreirense | Undisclosed | |
