= 1943 Taça de Portugal final =

- Event: 1942–43 Taça de Portugal
Benfica	Vitória de Setúbal
5	1
- Date: 20 June 1943
- Venue: Campo das Salésias, Lisbon
- Referee: Araújo Correia (Porto)

The 1943 Taça de Portugal final was the final match of the 1942–43 Taça de Portugal, the 5th season of the Taça de Portugal, the premier Portuguese football cup competition organized by the Portuguese Football Federation (FPF). The match was played on 20 June 1943 at the Campo das Salésias in Lisbon, and opposed two Primeira Liga sides: Benfica and Vitória de Setúbal. Benfica defeated Vitória de Setúbal 5–1 to claim their second Taça de Portugal.

== Match ==
=== Details ===
20 June 1943

Benfica	5–1	Vitória de Setúbal
Pipi 12'; Manuel da Costa 23'; Julinho 32', 88'; Armindo 75' (o.g.)		Amador 58'

Campo das Salésias, Lisbon
Referee: Araújo Correia (Porto)

Benfica	Vitória de Setúbal

GK	1	(Portugal) António Martins
DF		(Portugal) Álvaro Gaspar Pinto
MF		(Portugal) Francisco Ferreira (c)
MF		(Portugal) César Ferreira
MF		(Portugal) Joaquim Alcobia
MF		(Portugal) Rogério Pipi
MF		(Portugal) Manuel Jordão
MF		(Portugal) Manuel da Costa
FW		(Portugal) Joaquim Teixeira
FW		(Portugal) Francisco Pires
FW		(Portugal) Julinho
Substitutes:
Manager:
(Hungary) János Biri

GK	1	(Portugal) Indalécio
DF		(Portugal) Montês
DF		(Portugal) Armindo
DF		(Portugal) Joaquim Pacheco
MF		(Portugal) Francisco Júlio
MF		(Portugal) Passos
MF		(Portugal) Rogério Cruz
MF		(Portugal) António Figueiredo (c)
FW		(Portugal) Aníbal Rendas
FW		(Portugal) João Nunes
FW		(Portugal) Amador
Substitutes:
Manager:
(Portugal) Armando Martins

1942–43 Taça de Portugal Winners
Benfica
2nd Title

Match officials

- Assistant referees:
- Fourth official:

Match rules

- 90 minutes.
