= List of S.L. Benfica records and statistics =

Sport Lisboa e Benfica, commonly known as Benfica, is a Portuguese professional football club based in Lisbon. Founded on 28 February 1904 as Sport Lisboa, it merged with Grupo Sport Benfica in 1908, thus being renamed Sport Lisboa e Benfica. The club's records and statistics here gathered only concern competitive, professional matches – no exhibition games are considered. These records and statistics include data on honours, players, transfers, managers, and team records, respectively.

== Honours ==
Benfica is the most decorated club in Portugal, holding the records for most Primeira Liga, Taça de Portugal, and Taça da Liga titles, three of the four most important competitions in the country (the other being Supertaça Cândido de Oliveira). Moreover, Benfica is the only club to have won four consecutive editions of Taça de Portugal, from 1948–49 to 1952–53 (in 1949–50, the cup was not held), and four consecutive editions of Taça da Liga, from 2008–09 to 2011–12. On the international stage, Benfica have reached a record ten European finals, winning back-to-back European Cups in 1960–61 and 1961–62.

=== National titles ===
- Primeira Liga

Winners (38) – record: 1935–36, 1936–37, 1937–38, 1941–42, 1942–43, 1944–45, 1949–50, 1954–55, 1956–57, 1959–60, 1960–61, 1962–63, 1963–64, 1964–65, 1966–67, 1967–68, 1968–69, 1970–71, 1971–72, 1972–73, 1974–75, 1975–76, 1976–77, 1980–81, 1982–83, 1983–84, 1986–87, 1988–89, 1990–91, 1993–94, 2004–05, 2009–10, 2013–14, 2014–15, 2015–16, 2016–17, 2018–19, 2022–23

- Taça de Portugal

Winners (26) – record: 1939–40, 1942–43, 1943–44, 1948–49, 1950–51, 1951–52, 1952–53, 1954–55, 1956–57, 1958–59, 1961–62, 1963–64, 1968–69, 1969–70, 1971–72, 1979–80, 1980–81, 1982–83, 1984–85, 1985–86, 1986–87, 1992–93, 1995–96, 2003–04, 2013–14, 2016–17

- Supertaça Cândido de Oliveira

Winners (10): 1980, 1985, 1989, 2005, 2014, 2016, 2017, 2019, 2023, 2025

- Taça da Liga

Winners (8) – record: 2008–09, 2009–10, 2010–11, 2011–12, 2013–14, 2014–15, 2015–16, 2024–25

- Campeonato de Portugal

Winners (3): 1929–30, 1930–31, 1934–35

=== UEFA titles ===
- European Cup

Winners (2): 1960–61, 1961–62

=== Doubles ===
- Primeira Liga and Taça de Portugal ("Dobradinha")

11 – record: 1942–43, 1954–55, 1956–57, 1963–64, 1968–69, 1971–72, 1980–81, 1982–83, 1986–87, 2013–14, 2016–17

- Primeira Liga and Taça da Liga

4 – record: 2009–10, 2013–14, 2014–15, 2015–16

- Taça de Portugal and Taça da Liga

1 – shared record: 2013–14

- European double

1 – shared national record: 1960–61

- European cup double

1 – national record: 1961–62

=== Trebles ===
- Primeira Liga, Taça de Portugal and Taça da Liga

1 – record: 2013–14

== Players ==
Benfica's record appearance-maker is Nené, who made 575 appearances over the course of his career. Ten players have made more than 400 appearances, including four members of the 1961 European Cup-winning team. Eusébio is the club's top goalscorer with 473 goals in his 15-year spell. Only two other players have scored more than 300 goals for the club.

=== Appearances records ===
- Most appearances in all competitions: Nené, 575.
- Most league appearances: Nené, 422.
- Most appearances in UEFA club competitions: Luisão, 127.
- Most appearances in European Cup: Eusébio, 64.
- Most appearances in UEFA Champions League: Luisão, 61.
- Most appearances in UEFA Cup Winners' Cup: Humberto Coelho, 19.
- Most appearances in UEFA Cup: Nuno Gomes, 30.
- Most appearances in UEFA Europa League: Óscar Cardozo, 36.
- Most appearances in Taça da Liga: Jardel, 30
- Most appearances in Supertaça Cândido de Oliveira: António Veloso, 16.
- Most appearances in Derby de Lisboa: Francisco Albino, 56 (All-time record).
- Most appearances in O Clássico: António Veloso, 45.
- Youngest first-team player: Hugo Leal, 16 years and 335 days (against Espinho on 20 April 1997).
- First non-Portuguese player: Jorge Gomes Filho, Brazilian (first match against Vitória de Setúbal on 29 August 1979).

=== Most appearances ===
As of 25 September 2018

S.L. Benfica players with the most appearances
Player	Years	League	Total
(Portugal) Nené	1968–1986	422	575
(Portugal) Veloso	1980–1995	379	538
(Brazil) Luisão	2003–2018	337	538
(Portugal) Mário Coluna	1954–1970	364	518
(Portugal) Humberto Coelho	1968–1975; 1977–1984	355	498
(Portugal) Shéu	1972–1989	349	487
(Portugal) Manuel Bento	1972–1990	329	465

=== Goal scoring records ===
- Most goals scored in all competitions: Eusébio, 473.
- Most goals scored in a season: Eusébio, 50 (1967–68).
- Most league goals scored: Eusébio, 317.
- Most league goals scored in a season: Eusébio, 42 (1967–68).
- Most goals scored in UEFA club competitions: Eusébio, 56.
- Most goals scored in European Cup: Eusébio, 46.
- Most goals scored in UEFA Champions League: Óscar Cardozo, 11.
- Most goals scored in UEFA Cup Winners' Cup:
  - Eusébio, 7.
  - Nené, 7.
- Most goals scored in UEFA Cup: Nuno Gomes, 11.
- Most goals scored in UEFA Europa League: Óscar Cardozo, 20.
- Most goals scored in UEFA club competitions finals: Eusébio, 3 (2 in 1962 European Cup Final, 1 in 1963 European Cup Final).
- Most goals scored in Taça de Portugal finals: Rogério Pipi, 15 (All-time record).
- Most goals scored in Taça da Liga: Jonas, 10.
- Most goals scored in Taça da Liga finals:
  - Rodrigo, 2 (1 in 2012 Final, 1 in 2014 Final – All-time joint record).
  - Jonas, 2 (1 in 2015 Final, 1 in 2016 Final – All-time joint record).
  - Kostas Mitroglou, 2 (2 in 2016 Final – All-time joint record).
- Most goals scored in Supertaça Cândido de Oliveira:
  - Nené, 3 (1 in 1980, 2 in 1981).
  - Pizzi, 3 (1 in 2016, 2 in 2019).
- Most goals scored in Derby de Lisboa: Eusébio, 27.
- Most goals scored in O Clássico: Eusébio, 25 (All-time record).
- Most consecutive matches scoring at least one goal: Julinho, 12 (scored 20 times, from 16 October 1949 to 29 January 1950).
- Youngest goalscorer: Fernando Chalana, 17 years, 7 months and 7 days (against Académica on 25 September 1976).
- Most own-goals scored: Jardel, 4.

=== Top goalscorers ===
Top 10 goalscorers for S.L. Benfica
Player	Years	Matches	Goals
(Portugal) Eusébio	1961–1975	440	473
(Portugal) José Águas	1950–1963	384	379
(Portugal) Nené	1968–1986	575	359
(Portugal) José Torres	1959–1971	259	226
(Portugal) Arsénio	1943–1955	298	220
(Portugal) Rogério Pipi	1942–1947; 1947–1954	314	205
(Portugal) Julinho	1942–1951; 1952–1953	200	202
(Portugal) José Augusto	1959–1970	369	175
(Paraguay) Óscar Cardozo	2007–2014	293	172
(Portugal) Nuno Gomes	1997–2000; 2002–2011	399	166

==== Top non-Portuguese goalscorers ====
As of 27 October 2026

Top 10 non-Portuguese goalscorers for S.L. Benfica
Player	Years	Matches	Goals
(Paraguay) Óscar Cardozo	2007–2014	293	172
(Brazil) Jonas	2014–2019	183	137
(Sweden) Mats Magnusson	1987–1992	164	87
(Greece) Vangelis Pavlidis	2024–	127	77
(Denmark) Michael Manniche	1983–1987	132	75
(Switzerland) Haris Seferovic	2017–2022	188	74
(Brazil) Isaías	1990–1995	178	71
(Brazil) Lima	2012–2015	144	70
(Argentina) Eduardo Salvio	2010–2011; 2012–2019	266	62
(Greece) Kostas Mitroglou	2015–2017	88	52

=== Historical goals ===
==== Primeira Liga ====
As of 15 February 2025, Benfica have scored 6,237 goals in the Primeira Liga.

Goal	Player	Date	Match
1	(Portugal) Alfredo Valadas	20 January 1935	Benfica 1–0 Vitória de Setúbal
100	(Portugal) Alfredo Valadas	31 January 1937	Benfica 10–2 Leixões
500	(Portugal) Joaquim Teixeira	6 February 1944	Benfica 6–1 Salgueiros
1,000	(Portugal) Rosário	1949–50	Vitória de Guimarães 3–5 Benfica
1,500	(Portugal) José Águas	1956–57	Benfica 6–0 CUF
2,000	(Portugal) Yaúca	17 November 1963	Benfica 4–2 Belenenses
2,500	(Portugal) Artur Jorge	27 September 1970	Benfica 4–0 Boavista
3,000	(Portugal) Vítor Martins	13 February 1977	Benfica 6–1 Estoril
3,500	(Portugal) Nené	18 March 1984	Farense 2–7 Benfica
4,000	(Russia) Sergei Yuran	7 December 1991	Benfica 3–0 Beira-Mar
4,500	(Czech Republic) Karel Poborský	14 February 2000	Vitória de Setúbal 1–2 Benfica
5,000	(Honduras) David Suazo	2 November 2008	Vitória de Guimarães 1–2 Benfica
5,500	(Brazil) Jonas	20 December 2015	Benfica 3–1 Rio Ave
6,000	(Uruguay) Darwin Núñez	15 January 2022	Benfica 1–1 Moreirense

==== UEFA competitions ====
As of 18 February 2025, Benfica have scored 777 goals in UEFA competitions.

Goal	Player	Date	Match	Competition	Ref.
1	(Portugal) Francisco Palmeiro	19 September 1957	(Spain) Sevilla 3–1 Benfica	European Cup	
50	(Portugal) Eusébio	31 October 1962	(Sweden) Norrköping 1–1 Benfica	European Cup	
100	(Portugal) Pedras	30 September 1965	(Luxembourg) Stade Dudelange 3–1 Benfica	European Cup	
150	(Portugal) Jacinto Santos	12 February 1969	(Netherlands) Ajax 1–3 Benfica	European Cup	
200	(Portugal) Rui Jordão	2 October 1974	(Denmark) Vanløse 1–4 Benfica	European Cup Winners' Cup	
250	(Socialist Federal Republic of Yugoslavia) Zoran Filipović	3 November 1982	(Belgium) Lokeren 1–2 Benfica	UEFA Cup	
300	(Brazil) Ademir Alcântara	5 October 1988	Benfica 3–1 Montpellier (France)	UEFA Cup	
350	(Portugal) Pacheco	29 September 1992	(Slovenia) Belvedur Izola 0–5 Benfica	UEFA Cup	
400	(Brazil) Valdo	5 December 1995	(Germany) Bayern Munich 4–2 Benfica	UEFA Cup	
450	(Portugal) Simão	16 September 2004	(Slovakia) Dukla Banská Bystrica 0–3 Benfica	UEFA Cup	
500	(Paraguay) Óscar Cardozo	4 December 2008	(Ukraine) Shakhtar Donetsk 1–2 Benfica	UEFA Champions League	
550	(Paraguay) Óscar Cardozo	24 February 2011	(Germany) VfB Stuttgart 0–2 Benfica	UEFA Europa League	
600	(Paraguay) Óscar Cardozo	2 May 2013	Benfica 3–1 Fenerbahçe (Turkey)	UEFA Europa League	
650	(Argentina) Eduardo Salvio	1 November 2016	Benfica 1–0 Dynamo Kyiv (Ukraine)	UEFA Champions League	
700	(Portugal) Pizzi	3 December 2020	Benfica 4–0 Lech Poznań (Poland)	UEFA Champions League	
750	(Brazil) Arthur Cabral	12 December 2023	(Austria) Red Bull Salzburg 1–3 Benfica	UEFA Champions League	

=== Trophy winners ===
- Most league titles: Eusébio, 11 (1960–61, 1962–63, 1963–64, 1964–65, 1966–67, 1967–68, 1968–69, 1970–71, 1971–72, 1972–73, 1974–75 – All-time record).
- Most Taça de Portugal titles:
  - José Águas, 7 (1950–51, 1951–52, 1952–53, 1954–55, 1956–57, 1958–59, 1961–62)
  - Nené, 7 (1969–70, 1971–72, 1979–80, 1980–81, 1982–83, 1984–85, 1985–86)
- Most Taça da Liga titles: Luisão, 7 (2008–09, 2009–10, 2010–11, 2011–12, 2013–14, 2014–15, 2015–16 – All-time record).
- Most Supertaça Cândido de Oliveira titles: Luisão, 4 (2005, 2014, 2016, 2017).

=== Most titles won ===
Rank	Player	Years	Titles
1	(Brazil) Luisão	2003–2018	20
2	(Portugal) Nené	1968–1986	19
3	(Portugal) Mário Coluna	1954–1970	18
4	(Portugal) Eusébio	1961–1975	17
4	(Portugal) Shéu	1972–1989	17
6	(Portugal) António Simões	1961–1975	16
6	(Portugal) António Veloso	1980–1995	16
8	(Portugal) Cavém	1954–1970	15
8	(Portugal) Manuel Bento	1972–1992	15
8	(Brazil) Jardel	2011–2021	15

=== Team captains ===
Player	Years	Ref.
(Portugal) Fortunato Levy	1906–1907	
(Portugal) Félix Bermudes	1907–1908	
(Portugal) Cosme Damião	1908–1916	
(Portugal) Henrique Costa	1916	
(Portugal) Carlos Sobral	1916	
(Portugal) Herculano dos Santos	1920–1921	
(Portugal) Vítor Gonçalves	1921–1923	
(Portugal) José Pimenta	1923–1925	
(Portugal) José Simões	1926–1927	
(Portugal) Vítor Hugo	1928–1929	
(Portugal) João de Oliveira	1929	
(Portugal) Jorge Tavares	1929–1931	
(Portugal) Vítor Silva	1931–1934	
(Portugal) Gustavo Teixeira	1934–1938	
(Portugal) Gaspar Pinto	1938–1939	

Player	Years	Ref.
(Portugal) Alfredo Valadas	1939–1943	
(Portugal) Francisco Albino	1943–1945	
(Portugal) Francisco Ferreira	1945–1952	
(Portugal) Rogério Pipi	1952	
(Portugal) Joaquim Fernandes	1952–1955	
(Portugal) Fernando Caiado	1955–1959	
(Portugal) Artur Santos	1959–1961	
(Portugal) José Águas	1961–1963	
(Portugal) Mário Coluna	1963–1970	
(Portugal) António Simões	1970–1974	
(Portugal) Toni	1974–1980	
(Portugal) Humberto Coelho	1980–1983	
(Portugal) Nené	1983–1984	
(Portugal) Manuel Bento	1984–1986	
(Portugal) Shéu Han	1986–1989	

Player	Years	Ref.
(Portugal) Diamantino Miranda	1989–1990	
(Portugal) António Veloso	1990–1995	
(Portugal) João Vieira Pinto	1995–2000	
(Portugal) Calado	2000	
(Portugal) Paulo Madeira	2000–2001	
(Portugal) Fernando Meira	2001–2002	
(Germany) Robert Enke	2002	
(Federal Republic of Yugoslavia) Ljubinko Drulović	2002–2003	
(Portugal) Hélder	2003–2004	
(Portugal) Simão Sabrosa	2004–2007	
(Portugal) Nuno Gomes	2007–2011	
(Brazil) Luisão	2011–2018	
(Brazil) Jardel	2018–2021	
(Portugal) André Almeida	2021–2022	
(Argentina) Nicolás Otamendi	2022–2026	
(Norway) Fredrik Aursnes	2026–	

=== Individual award winners ===
- Ballon d'Or: Eusébio, 1965.
- European Golden Shoe:
  - Eusébio, 43 goals, 1967–68 (inaugural winner).
  - Eusébio, 40 goals, 1972–73.

==== Bola de Prata ====
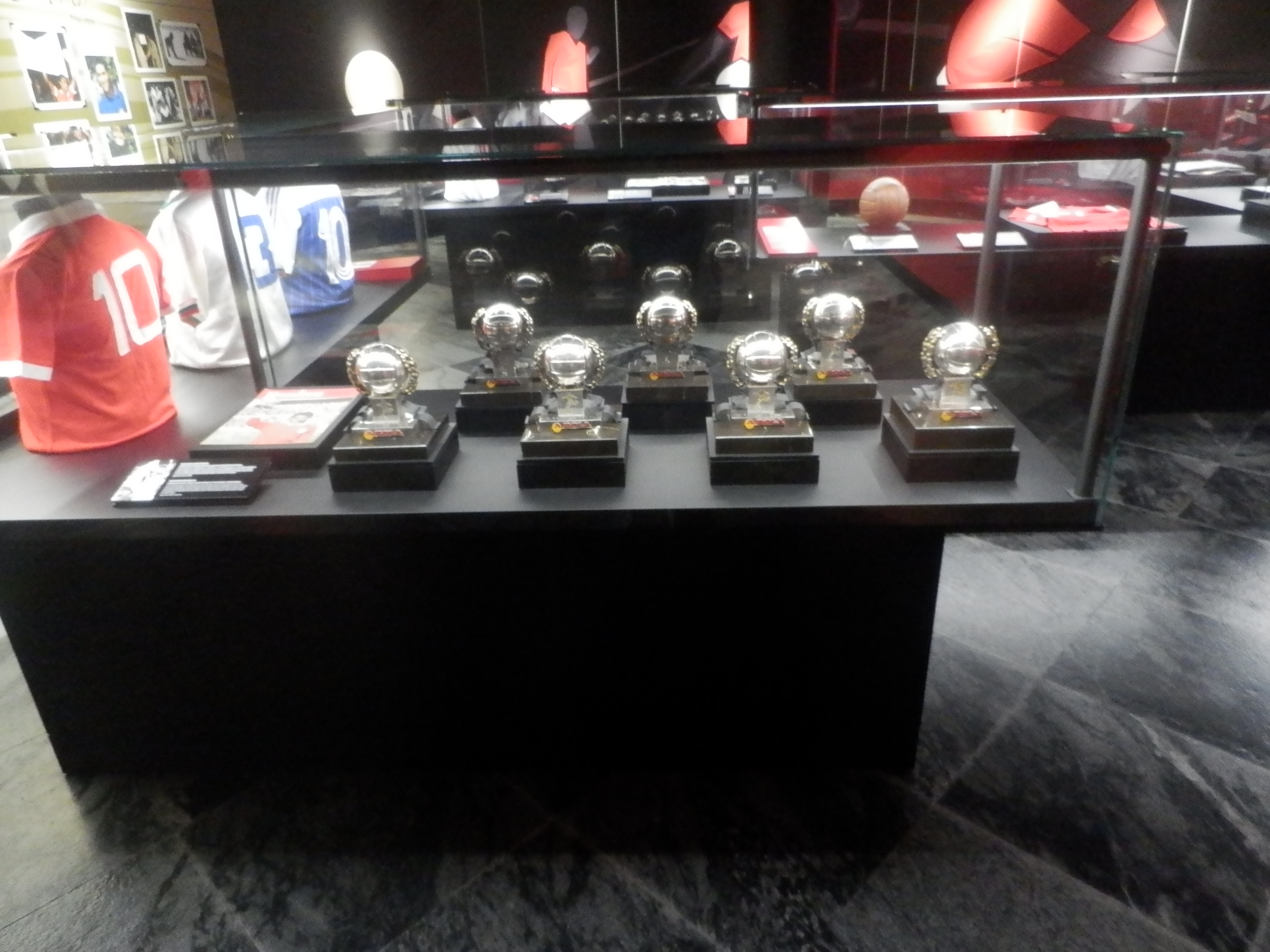
The seven Silver Balls won by Eusébio in exhibition at Museu Cosme Damião

Primeira Liga top scorer
Player	Award(s)	Season(s)
(Portugal) Eusébio	7	1963–64, 1964–65, 1965–66 (shared), 1966–67, 1967–68, 1969–70, 1972–73
(Portugal) José Águas	5	1951–52, 1955–56, 1956–57, 1958–59, 1960–61
(Portugal) Julinho	2	1942–43, 1949–50
(Portugal) Artur Jorge	2	1970–71, 1971–72
(Portugal) Nené	2	1980–81, 1983–84 (shared)
(Paraguay) Óscar Cardozo	2	2009–10, 2011–12 (shared)
(Brazil) Jonas	2	2015–16, 2017–18
(Portugal) José Torres	1	1962–63
(Portugal) Rui Jordão	1	1975–76
(Angola) Vata	1	1988–89
(Sweden) Mats Magnusson	1	1989–90
(Portugal) Rui Águas	1	1990–91
(Portugal) Simão Sabrosa	1	2002–03 (shared)
(Switzerland) Haris Seferovic	1	2018–19
(Brazil) Carlos Vinícius	1	2019–20
(Uruguay) Darwin Núñez	1	2021–22

==== Cosme Damião Award ====
Benfica's Player of the Year
Year	Winner	Ref.
2006	(Portugal) Simão	
2007	(Portugal) Rui Costa	
2008	(Greece) Kostas Katsouranis	
2009	(Brazil) Luisão	
2010	(Portugal) Fábio Coentrão	
2011	(Argentina) Pablo Aimar	
2012	(Uruguay) Maxi Pereira	
2013	Not awarded	
2014	(Argentina) Nicolás Gaitán	
2015	(Brazil) Jonas	
2016	(Brazil) Jonas	
2017	(Brazil) Jonas	
2018	(Brazil) Jonas	
2019	(Portugal) Pizzi	
2020	(Germany) Julian Weigl	
2021	(Uruguay) Darwin Núñez	

== Transfers ==
Note: In the rankings below, inflation is not taken into account.

=== Highest transfer fees paid ===
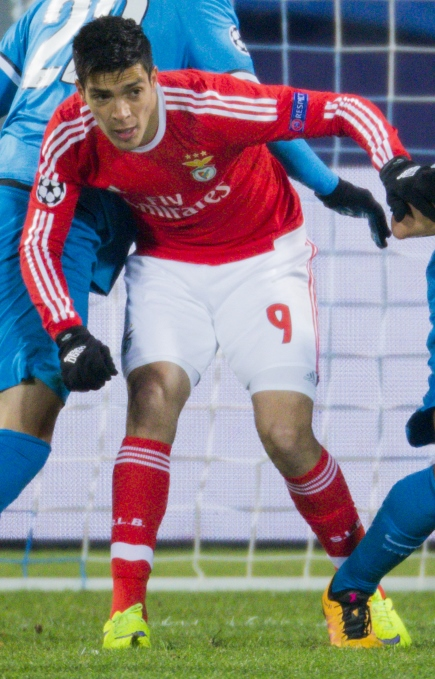
Forward Raúl Jiménez was once the most expensive Benfica signing and, simultaneously, the most lucrative player transferred.

Rank	Player	Transfer fee	From	Date	Ref.
1	(Turkey) Orkun Kökçü	€25.0M	(Netherlands) Feyenoord	10 June 2023	
1	(Uruguay) Darwin Núñez	€25.0M	(Spain) Almería	4 September 2020	
3	(Brazil) Everton	€22.0M	(Brazil) Grêmio	14 August 2020	
4	(Mexico) Raúl Jiménez	€21.8M	(Spain) Atlético Madrid	21 July 2016	
5	(Spain) Raúl de Tomás	€20.8M	(Spain) Real Madrid	3 July 2019	
6	(Germany) Julian Weigl	€20.4M	(Germany) Borussia Dortmund	2 January 2020	
7	(Ukraine) Roman Yaremchuk	€20M	(Belgium) Gent	29 August 2022	
7	(Brazil) Arthur Cabral	€20M	(Italy) Fiorentina	10 August 2023	
9	(Brazil) Marcos Leonardo	€18M	(Brazil) Santos	4 January 2024	
9	(Greece) Vangelis Pavlidis	€18M	(Netherlands) AZ Alkmaar	1 July 2024	

=== Highest transfer fees received ===
Rank	Player	Transfer fee	To	Date	Ref.
1	(Portugal) João Félix	€126M	(Spain) Atlético Madrid	3 July 2019	
2	(Argentina) Enzo Fernández	€121M	(England) Chelsea	1 February 2023	
3	(Uruguay) Darwin Núñez	€80M	(England) Liverpool	12 November 2022	
4	(Portugal) Rúben Dias	€68M	(England) Manchester City	29 September 2020	
5	(Portugal) Gonçalo Ramos	€65M	(France) Paris Saint-Germain	22 November 2023	
6	(Portugal) João Neves	€60M	(France) Paris Saint-Germain	5 August 2024	
7	(Mexico) Raúl Jiménez	€41M	(England) Wolverhampton Wanderers	4 April 2019	
8	(Portugal) Nélson Semedo	€40.7M	(Spain) Barcelona	18 December 2019	
9	(Belgium) Axel Witsel	€40M	(Russia) Zenit Saint Petersburg	3 September 2012	
9	(Brazil) Ederson	€40M	(England) Manchester City	1 June 2017	
9	(Brazil) Marcos Leonardo	€40M	(Saudi Arabia) Al Hilal	2 September 2024	

== Managerial records ==
- First manager: Manuel Gourlade (first match against Carcavelos on 4 November 1906).
- First non-Portuguese manager: Arthur John, English (first match against Sporting CP on 20 October 1929).

=== Managers with most seasons ===
As of 28 December 2021

Rank	Manager	Seasons
1	Cosme Damião	18
2	János Biri	8
2	Jorge Jesus	8
4	Otto Glória	7
5	Ribeiro dos Reis	6
6	Lippo Hertzka	5
6	John Mortimore	5
6	Sven-Göran Eriksson	5
6	Toni	5

=== Managers with most games, including wins ===
As of 28 December 2021

Rank	Manager	Games	Wins
1	Jorge Jesus	404	277
2	János Biri	272	194
3	Otto Glória	244	158
4	Sven-Göran Eriksson	234	159
5	Toni	215	126

=== Trophy winners ===
- First title: Cosme Damião, Campeonato de Lisboa (1909–10).
- Most trophies: Jorge Jesus, 10 (1 Taça de Portugal, 1 Supertaça Cândido de Oliveira, 3 Primeira Liga, 5 Taça da Liga).
- Most Campeonato de Lisboa titles: Cosme Damião, 8 (1909–10, 1911–12, 1912–13 1913–14, 1915–16, 1916–17, 1917–18, 1919–20).
- Most Campeonato de Portugal titles: Arthur John, 2 (1929–30, 1930–31).
- Most Taça de Portugal titles:
  - János Biri, 3 (1939–40, 1942–43, 1943–44).
  - Otto Glória, 3 (1954–55, 1956–57, 1968–69).
- Most Continental titles: Béla Guttmann, 2 (1960–61, 1961–62).
- Most league titles: Otto Glória, 4 (1954–55, 1956–57, 1967–68, 1968–69).
- Most Taça da Liga trophies: Jorge Jesus, 5 (2009–10, 2010–11, 2011–12, 2013–14, 2014–15).
- Most Supertaça Cândido de Oliveira trophies: Rui Vitória, 2 (2016–17, 2017–18).
- Most trophies in a season:
  - Lajos Baróti, 3 (1980–81 – Supertaça Cândido de Oliveira, Primeira Liga and Taça de Portugal).
  - Jorge Jesus, 3 (2013–14 – Taça da Liga, Primeira Liga and Taça de Portugal).
  - Jorge Jesus, 3 (2014–15 – Supertaça Cândido de Oliveira, Primeira Liga and Taça da Liga).
  - Rui Vitória, 3 (2016–17 – Supertaça Cândido de Oliveira, Primeira Liga and Taça de Portugal).

== Club records ==
=== Matches ===
==== Firsts ====
- First match: Carcavelos 3–1 Benfica, Campeonato de Lisboa, 4 November 1906.
- First Derby de Lisboa match: Benfica 1–2 Sporting CP, Campeonato de Lisboa, 1 December 1907.
- First Campeonato de Portugal match: Braga 3–4 Benfica (round of 16), 3 April 1927.
- First O Clássico match: Benfica 3–0 FC Porto, Campeonato de Portugal (final), 28 June 1931.
- First league match: Benfica 3–1 Vitória de Setúbal, 20 January 1935.
- First Taça de Portugal match: Luso SC 0–5 Benfica (Round 1 – first leg), 14 May 1939.
- First European Cup match: Sevilla 3–1 Benfica (Round 1 – first leg), 19 September 1957.
- First Intercontinental Cup match: Benfica 1–0 Peñarol (first leg), 6 September 1961.
- First UEFA Cup Winners' Cup match: Olimpija Ljubljana 1–1 Benfica (Round 1 – first leg), 16 September 1970.
- First UEFA Cup match: Nantes 0–2 Benfica (Round 1 – first leg), 13 September 1978.
- First Supertaça Cândido de Oliveira match: Sporting CP 2–2 Benfica (first leg), 10 September 1980.
- First UEFA Champions League match: Hajduk Split 0–0 Benfica (group stage), 14 September 1994.
- First match at Estádio da Luz: Benfica 1–2 Beira-Mar (Primeira Liga), 2 November 2003.
- First Taça da Liga match: Estrela da Amadora 1–1 Benfica (4–5, pso) (Round 3), 26 September 2007.
- First UEFA Europa League match: Benfica 4–0 Vorskla Poltava (Play-off round – first leg), 20 August 2009.

==== Wins ====
- Record win: Lisboa FC 0–15 Benfica, Campeonato de Lisboa, 9 April 1911.
- Record Campeonato de Portugal win: União Operário 1–8 Benfica (Round 1), 30 March 1930.
- Record O Clássico win: Benfica 12–2 FC Porto (Primeira Liga) (All-time record), 7 February 1943.
- Record Derby de Lisboa win:
  - Benfica 5–0 Sporting CP, Campeonato de Lisboa, 3 December 1939.
  - Benfica 7–2 Sporting CP, Primeira Liga, 28 April 1946.
  - Benfica 5–0 Sporting CP, Primeira Liga, 19 November 1978.
  - Benfica 5–0 Sporting CP, Taça de Portugal (quarterfinals), 12 March 1986.
  - Benfica 5–0 Sporting CP, Supertaça Cândido de Oliveira, 4 August 2019.
- Record league win: Benfica 13–1 Sanjoanense, 27 April 1947.
- Record Intercontinental Cup win: Benfica 1–0 Peñarol (first leg), 6 September 1961.
- Record European Cup win: Benfica 10–0 Stade Dudelange (preliminary round – second leg), 5 October 1965.
- Record UEFA Cup Winners' Cup win: Benfica 8–1 Olimpija Ljubljana (Round 1 – second leg), 30 September 1970.
- Record Taça de Portugal win: Benfica 14–1 Riachense (round of 16), 11 January 1989.
- Record UEFA Cup win: Belvedur Izola 0–5 Benfica (first round – second leg), 30 September 1992.
- Record UEFA Champions League win: Benfica 6–0 Beitar Jerusalem (Second qualifying round – first leg), 12 August 1998.
- Record UEFA Europa League win: Benfica 5–0 Everton (group stage), 22 October 2009.
- Record Taça da Liga win: Moreirense 1–6 Benfica (Round 3), 26 January 2016.
- Record Supertaça Cândido de Oliveira win: Benfica 5–0 Sporting CP, 4 August 2019.

==== Defeats ====
- Record defeat:
  - Benfica 0–8 Império, Campeonato de Lisboa, 30 October 1927.
  - Porto 8–0 Benfica, Campeonato de Portugal (quarterfinals – first leg), 28 May 1933.
- Record Taça de Portugal defeat: Benfica 1–6 Porto (semifinals – first leg), 11 June 1939.
- Record Intercontinental Cup win: Peñarol 5–0 Benfica (second leg) (All-time record), 17 September 1961.
- Record European Cup defeat: Borussia Dortmund 5–0 Benfica (Round 1 – second leg), 4 December 1963.
- Record UEFA Cup Winners' Cup defeat:
  - Vorwärts Berlin 2–0 Benfica (Round 2 – second leg), 4 November 1970.
  - Benfica 0–2 Fiorentina (Quarter-finals – first leg), 6 March 1997.
- Record league defeat: Sporting CP 7–1 Benfica, 14 December 1986.
- Record Supertaça Cândido de Oliveira defeat: Benfica 0–5 Porto, 18 September 1996.
- Record UEFA Cup defeat: Celta Vigo 7–0 Benfica (third round – first leg), 25 November 1999
- Record UEFA Europa League defeat: Liverpool 4–1 (quarterfinals – second leg), 8 April 2010.
- Record Taça da Liga defeat: Moreirense 3–1 Benfica (semifinals), 26 January 2017.
- Record UEFA Champions League defeat: Basel 5–0 Benfica (group stage), 27 September 2017.

==== Streaks ====
- Longest unbeaten run (all competitions): 48 matches (from 22 December 1963 to 14 February 1965).
- Longest league winning run: 29 matches (from 9 April 1972 to 11 March 1973) (European record).
- Longest winning run (all domestic competitions): 34 matches (from 9 April 1972 to 18 March 1973).
- Longest unbeaten league run: 56 matches (from 27 October 1974 to 1 September 1978).
- Longest winning run (all competitions): 18 matches (from 12 December 2010 to 2 March 2011) (domestic joint record).
- Longest period without conceding a home goal (all competitions): 941 minutes (from the 37' on 10 December 2013 to the 78' on 20 March 2014).
- Longest away winning streak (all competitions): 11 matches (from 2 January 2016 to 20 March 2016).
- Longest away winning streak (league): 16 matches (from 2 January 2016 to 23 October 2016).

=== Goals ===
- Fewest league goals scored in a season: 34 in 14 matches (1937–38).
- Most league goals scored in a season:
  - 103 in 26 matches (1963–64).
  - 103 in 34 matches (2018–19).
- Fewest league goals conceded in a season: 11 in 30 matches (1977–78).
- Most league goals conceded in a season: 48 in 34 matches (1989–90).

=== Points ===
==== League ====
- Most points in a season:
  - Two points for a win: 69 in 38 matches (1990–91) (domestic record).
  - Three points for a win: 88 in 34 matches (2015–16).
- Fewest points in a season:
  - Two points for a win: 18 in 14 matches (1940–41).
  - Three points for a win: 52 in 30 matches (2007–08).

==== European Cup group stage ====
- Most/Fewest points in a season: 5 in 6 matches (1991–92).

==== UEFA Champions League group stage ====
- Most points in a season:
  - Two points for a win: 9 in 6 matches (1994–95).
  - Three points for a win: 14 in 6 matches (2022–23).
- Fewest points in a season:
  - Two points for a win: 9 in 6 matches (1994–95).
  - Three points for a win: 0 in 6 matches (2017–18) (domestic record).

==== UEFA Cup group stage ====
- Most points in a season: 9 in 4 matches (2004–05).
- Fewest points in a season: 1 in 4 matches (2008–09).

==== UEFA Europa League group stage ====
- Most points in a season: 15 in 6 matches (2009–10).
- Fewest points in a season: 12 in 6 matches (2020–21).

== See also ==
- European association football club records and statistics
