= 1944 Taça de Portugal final =

- Event: 1943–44 Taça de Portugal
Benfica	Estoril
8	0
- Date: 28 May 1944
- Venue: Campo das Salésias, Lisbon
- Referee: Carlos Canuto (Lisbon)

The 1944 Taça de Portugal final was the final match of the 1943–44 Taça de Portugal, the 6th season of the Taça de Portugal, the premier Portuguese football cup competition organized by the Portuguese Football Federation (FPF). The match was played on 28 May 1944 at the Campo das Salésias in Lisbon, and opposed Primeira Liga side Benfica and Portuguese Second Division side Estoril. Benfica defeated Estoril 8–0 to claim their third Taça de Portugal.

== Match ==
=== Details ===
28 May 1944

Benfica	8–0	Estoril
Pipi 13', 56', 69', 75', 86'; Julinho 15', 29'; Arsénio 35'

Campo das Salésias, Lisbon
Referee: Carlos Canuto (Lisbon)

Benfica	Estoril

GK	1	(Portugal) António Martins
MF		(Portugal) Francisco Ferreira (c)
MF		(Portugal) César Ferreira
MF		(Portugal) Francisco Albino
MF		(Portugal) Rogério Pipi
MF		(Portugal) João Silva
MF		(Portugal) António Carvalho
FW		(Portugal) Joaquim Teixeira
FW		(Portugal) Julinho
FW		(Portugal) Guilherme Espírito Santo
FW		(Portugal) Arsénio Duarte
Substitutes:
Manager:
(Hungary) János Biri

GK	1	(Portugal) Valongo
DF		(Portugal) Alberto Jesus
DF		(Portugal) Pereira
DF		(Portugal) Julio Costa
MF		(Portugal) António Eloi
MF		(Portugal) António Nunes
MF		(Portugal) Canal
MF		(Portugal) Gomes Bravo (c)
FW		(Socialist Federal Republic of Yugoslavia) Franjo Petrak
FW		(Argentina) Raul Sbarra
FW		(Portugal) Raúl Silva
Substitutes:
Manager:
(Portugal) Augusto Silva

1943–44 Taça de Portugal Winners
Benfica
3rd Title

Match officials

- Assistant referees:
- Fourth official:

Match rules

- 90 minutes.
