= João Silva (footballer, born 1926) =

Portuguese footballer

Personal information
- Full name: João da Silva
- Place of birth: Portugal
- Position: Half-back

Senior career*
Years	Team	Apps	(Gls)
1943–1945	Benfica	13	(1)
- * Club domestic league appearances and goals

João da Silva is a Portuguese footballer who played as a half-back.

== Career ==
Silva arrived at Benfica in 1943, making his debut at the hands of Janos Biri on 28 November, against Vitória de Setúbal. With Alcobia, Albino and Francisco Ferreira as competition, he was seen as back-up, playing only 15 games between league and cup in 1943–44. Nonetheless, he played all seven games in the campaign winning run in the Portuguese Cup, which included an 8–0 trashing of Estoril in the final.

With the breakthrough of Moreira in 1944–45, Silva dropped further in the pecking order, playing only 11 games, five of those in the league, enough to secure another honour, his first Primeira Divisão title. He left the club in 1945 with 26 games played and 2 goals scored.

== Honours ==
Benfica

- Primeira Divisão: 1944–45
- Taça de Portugal: 1943–44
