= Conceição Rodrigues =

Portuguese footballer (born 1919)

Personal information
- Full name: José Rodrigues da Conceição
- Date of birth: 7 May 1919
- Place of birth: Portugal
- Position: Half-back

Senior career*
Years	Team	Apps	(Gls)
1940–1943	Benfica	18	(4)
- * Club domestic league appearances and goals

José Rodrigues da Conceição (born 7 May 1919) is a Portuguese retired footballer who played as a half-back.

Rodrigues joined Benfica in 1940, winning two league titles in his three seasons there.

== Career ==
Rodrigues arrived at Benfica at the hands of Janos Biri, making his debut on 6 October 1940, against Carcavelinhos. With Albino, Raúl Baptista and César Ferreira as competitors, he was relegated to back-up, playing only 9 league games, but appearing in all of the Campeonato de Lisboa games. In his second season, he remained a fringe player, receiving the majority of his playing time in the regional league, as Benfica won the Primeira Liga. Conceição last season was in 1942–43, playing only two games, enough to receive the championship medal for the back-to-back league title that his team won.

== Honours ==
Benfica

- Primeira Liga: 1941–42, 1942–43
