= 1940 Taça de Portugal final =

- Event: 1939–40 Taça de Portugal
Belenenses	Benfica
1	3
- Date: 7 July 1940
- Venue: Estádio do Lumiar, Lisbon
- Referee: Santos Palma (Santarém)

The 1940 Taça de Portugal final was the final match of the 1939–40 Taça de Portugal, the 2nd season of the Taça de Portugal, the premier Portuguese football cup competition organized by the Portuguese Football Federation (FPF). The match was played on 7 July 1940 at the Estádio do Lumiar in Lisbon, and opposed two Primeira Liga sides: Belenenses and Benfica. Benfica defeated Belenenses 3–1 to claim their first Taça de Portugal.

== Match ==
=== Details ===
7 July 1940

Belenenses	1–3	Benfica
Correia 78'		Rodrigues 15'; Valadas 34'; Espírito Santo 65'

Estádio do Lumiar, Lisbon
Referee: Santos Palma (Santarém)

Belenenses	Benfica

GK	1	(Portugal) Salvador Jorge
DF		(Argentina) Óscar Tarrio
DF		(Portugal) Francisco Gatinho
MF		(Portugal) Mariano Amaro (c)
MF		(Portugal) Francisco Gomes
MF		(Portugal) Alberto Gomes
FW		(Argentina) Alejandro Scopelli
FW		(Portugal) Perfeito Rodrigues
FW		(Portugal) Rafael Correia
FW		(Portugal) Artur Quaresma
FW		(Argentina) Horácio Tellechea
Substitutes:
Manager:
(Argentina) Alejandro Scopelli

GK	1	(Portugal) António Martins
DF		(Portugal) Francisco Elói
DF		(Portugal) Álvaro Gaspar Pinto
MF		(Portugal) Francisco Ferreira (c)
MF		(Portugal) César Ferreira
MF		(Portugal) Francisco Albino
MF		(Portugal) Guilherme Espírito Santo
MF		(Portugal) Joaquim Teixeira
FW		(Portugal) Alexandre Brito
FW		(Portugal) Alfredo Valadas
FW		(Portugal) Francisco Rodrigues
Substitutes:
Manager:
(Hungary) János Biri

1939–40 Taça de Portugal Winners
Benfica
1st Title

Match officials

- Assistant referees:
- Fourth official:

Match rules

- 90 minutes.
