= Mário Rui (footballer, born 1925) =

Portuguese footballer (born 1925)

Personal information
- Full name: Mário Rui Sousa e Silva
- Date of birth: 27 March 1925
- Place of birth: Portugal
- Position: Forward

Youth career
- 1941–1943: Benfica

Senior career*
Years	Team	Apps	(Gls)
1943–1948	Benfica	30	(18)
1950–1952	Belenenses	37	(7)
1952–1954	Benfica	2	(0)
1954–1956	Oriental de Lisboa		
- * Club domestic league appearances and goals

Mário Rui Sousa e Silva (born 27 March 1925), known as Mário Rui, is a Portuguese retired footballer who played as a forward.

Rui is most known for his five–year spell at Benfica, where he scored 24 goals in 59 games, winning the Taça de Portugal in 1943–44 and the Primeira Liga in 1944–45.

== Career ==
Mário Rui arrived at Benfica at age 16 to play for their youth team. After three years there, on 14 May 1944, he made his debut for the first team in a cup match against Académica. He played again a week later, helping Benfica qualify for the Cup final, which he missed.

The following year, he played eight games and scored five goals, being part of an offensive line that included Julinho, Espírito Santo, Rogério Pipi and Arsénio and was dubbed the Os Cinco Diabos Vermelhos (Five Red Devils). Mário Rui's breakthrough happened in 1945–46, when he scored 15 goals in 28 matches, being a vital part of the first team that finished second to Belenenses in the league. However, the appearance of Vitor Baptista, Corona and Alfredo Melão in the following seasons, removed him of the first team and he became a fringe player.

Mário Rui played for Belenenses from 1950 to 1952, amassing 40 games and nine goals, which helped him return to Benfica in 1952, where he was once again, a rarely used player, with two games in two seasons. After Benfica, he played for Oriental de Lisboa until 1956

== Honours ==
Benfica

- Primeira Liga: 1944–45
- Taça de Portugal: 1943–44
