= Carlos Brito (footballer, born 1919) =

Portuguese footballer (born 1919)

Personal information
- Full name: Carlos Correia de Brito
- Date of birth: 1 December 1919
- Place of birth: Lourenço Marques, Portuguese Mozambique
- Place of death: Portugal
- Position: Forward

Senior career*
Years	Team	Apps	(Gls)
1938–1946	Benfica	43	(26)
- * Club domestic league appearances and goals

Carlos Correia de Brito (born 1 December 1919, date of death unknown) was a Portuguese footballer who played as a forward.

Brito joined Benfica in 1938, scoring 44 goals in 79 games, winning three major titles.

== Early life ==
Brito was born in Lourenço Marques (present-day Maputo), Portuguese Mozambique and moved to Portugal.

== Career ==
Brito arrived at Benfica in 1938, at the hands of Lippo Hertzka, making his debut on q October, against Sporting. In his first year, he scored 15 goals in 25 games, with Benfica reaching the inaugural 1939 Taça de Portugal Final. The next season, he increased his goalscoring record to 18 in 34 appearances, as Benfica won the 1940 Taça de Portugal Final.

However, starting in his third season, strong competition from Valadas, Teixeira and Francisco Rodrigues saw Brito's playing time significantly cut short, as he appeared in six games in 1940–41, and none from 1941 until 1943. In his last two years he played a total of three games for Benfica, after which he departed the club with 44 goals scored in 79 games.

== Honours ==
Benfica

- Primeira Liga: 1942–43, 1944–45
- Taça de Portugal: 1939–40
- Campeonato de Lisboa: 1939-40
