= Manuel da Costa (footballer, born 1916) =

Portuguese footballer

Personal information
- Date of birth: 10 August 1916
- Place of birth: Portugal
- Date of death: Deceased
- Place of death: Portugal
- Position(s): Half-back

Senior career*
Years	Team	Apps	(Gls)
1935–1936	Vila Real		
1936–1941	Académica	58	(17)
1941–1945	Benfica	43	(28)
1945–1947	Atlético CP	29	(11)
- *Club domestic league appearances and goals

Manuel da Costa (10 August 1916 – deceased), is a former Portuguese footballer who played as a half-back.

Starting at Vila Real, Costa moved to Académica, where he spent five years and won the 1938–39 Taça de Portugal. In 1941, he joined Benfica, where he won three league titles.

== Career ==
Costa began at Vila Real, before transferring for Académica de Coimbra, where he would spend five years and win the inaugural Taça de Portugal in 1938–39. Afterwards, he joined Benfica and made his debut on 18 January 1942 against Carcavelinhos. Alongside Francisco Rodrigues, Joaquim Teixeira and Alfredo Valadas, he helped Benfica win the league title, contributing with 6 goals in 16 games. The following year, still as first team player, he scored 12 in 14 games as Benfica retained the league title.

His third season was not as successful, as Benfica lost the league title, despite him scoring 7 league goals. His playing time dwindled in his fourth year, as Julinho, Espírito Santo and Arsénio gained recognition. Still, with two appearances in the Primeira Divisão, he secured his third league title. He left Benfica to play for Atlético CP in 1945, staying there for two seasons.

== Honours ==
Académica

- Taça de Portugal: 1938–39

Benfica

- Primeira Liga: 1941–42, 1942–43, 1944–45
- Taça de Portugal: 1942–43
