= Manuel Jordão =

Portuguese footballer

Personal information
- Full name: Manuel Maria Pais Jordão
- Date of birth: 5 November 1921
- Place of birth: Barreiro, Portugal
- Date of death: Deceased
- Place of death: Portugal
- Position: Half-back

Senior career*
Years	Team	Apps	(Gls)
1938–1942	Barreirense	3	(0)
1942–1946	Benfica	15	(2)
- * Club domestic league appearances and goals

Manuel Maria Pais Jordão (5 November 1921 – unknown) was a Portuguese footballer who played as a half-back.

Starting at Barreirense, Jordão joined Benfica in 1942, where he won two league titles.

== Career ==
Born in Barreiro, Portugal, Jordão joined his home-town club, Barreirense at age 17, representing them for four seasons, before moving to Benfica in 1942. He made his debut for them on 25 October, against GD Fósforos. Despite competition from Alcobia, Albino and Francisco Ferreira, he still played 14 times, helping Benfica win the league and cup double. In 1943–44, his playing time dropped to just one game, in the regional league.

Jordão won his second league title in the following year, thanks to the three games played in January 1944. He played more games in 1945–46, but Benfica failed to win any silverware. He left the club in 1946 with 29 appearances and 2 goals.

== Honours ==
Benfica

- Primeira Liga: 1942–43, 1944–45
- Taça de Portugal: 1939–40, 1942–43
