= Francisco Pires =

Portuguese footballer

Personal information
- Date of birth: 24 December 1921
- Place of birth: Portugal
- Position(s): Forward

Senior career*
Years	Team	Apps	(Gls)
1940–1945	Benfica	17	(7)
- *Club domestic league appearances and goals

Francisco Pires (born 24 December 1921) was a Portuguese footballer who played as a forward.

Pires joined Benfica in 1940, winning a double of league and cup in 1942–43.

== Career ==
Pires arrived at Benfica by the hands of Janos Biri, making his debut on 19 January 1941, against Sporting. With competition from Lourenço, Valadas, Teixeira and Rodrigues, he found it difficult to break into the first team, despite playing seven league games in his first year. In his second season, he competed exclusivity in the Campeonato de Lisboa, not receiving a winners medal for the league title that Benfica won.

In 1942–43, he received some playing time in the league, enough to win his first league, helping with one goal in 4 appearances. Plus, his four goals in the Portuguese Cup, contributed to Benfica winning the double. In the following season, Pires scored five in six league games, but Benfica failed to retain the league title. After a lacklustre season in 1944–45, with only two games in the regional league, he left Benfica.

== Honours ==
Benfica

- Primeira Liga: 1942–43
- Taça de Portugal: 1942–43
