= César Ferreira =

Portuguese footballer

Personal information
- Full name: José César Ferreira
- Date of birth: 10 April 1916
- Place of birth: Vila do Bispo, Portugal
- Date of death: Deceased
- Position: Midfielder

Senior career*
Years	Team	Apps	(Gls)
1937–1944	Benfica	50	(0)
Total		50	(0)
- * Club domestic league appearances and goals

José César Ferreira (10 April 1916 – deceased) was a Portuguese footballer who played as midfielder.

== Career ==
Born in Vila do Bispo, near Sagres, Ferreira arrived at Benfica in 1938, making his debut on 22 December of the same year, against Casa Pia. Although Albino, Gaspar Pinto and Francisco Ferreira left him little chance to play in his first season, in the following years he gradually gained importance, playing 16 league games in 1941–42, 13 in 1942–43 and 17 in 1943–44. From 1944, with the breakthrough of Francisco Moreira, his playing time was cut significantly and he left the club in 1946 with six major titles won in 111 appearances in all competitions.

== Honours ==
Benfica

- Primeira Divisão: 1941–42, 1942–43, 1944–45
- Taça de Portugal: 1939–40, 1942–43, 1943–44
