= Vítor Baptista (footballer, born 1920) =

Portuguese footballer

Personal information
- Full name: Vítor Baptista da Costa
- Date of birth: 13 May 1920
- Place of birth: Vale de Cambra, Portugal
- Date of death: 2008 (aged 87–88)
- Place of death: Portugal
- Position: Forward

Senior career*
Years	Team	Apps	(Gls)
- Vale de Cambra
- Valecambrense
- Sanjoanense
1946–1949	Benfica	59	(30)
1949–1952	Sanjoanense		
- * Club domestic league appearances and goals

Vítor Baptista da Costa (13 May 1920 – 2008), is a former Portuguese footballer who played as a forward.

He is most known for his short three–year spell at Benfica, where he scored 40 goals in 70 games, winning the Taça de Portugal in 1948–49.

== Career ==
Born in Macieira de Cambra, Vale de Cambra, Baptista started at Vale de Cambra SC, followed by Associação Desportiva Valecambrense and finally Sanjoanense. He joined Benfica in 1946, making his debut on 6 October against Oriental. Despite heavy competition from Espírito Santo, Julinho and Rogério Pipi, he still finished the season with 33 appearances, scoring 24 goals in all competitions.

His second season was less prolific, as his playing time dropped, and he scored only 10 goals in 26 matches. In his third and final year at Benfica, he numbers dropped again to 11 games and six goals, but still help them win the Taça de Portugal, in his only silverware there. In total, in the three years at Benfica, Baptista played 70 games and scored 40 goals. Afterwards, he returned to Sanjoanense to play for few more seasons, taking on management in lower levels clubs of his home-town in 1952.

== Honours ==
Benfica

- Taça de Portugal: 1948–49
