= Angústias A.C. =

Portuguese athletic club

Angústias Atlético Clube (commonly shortened as Angústias AC), is an athletic club and football team founded in 1923, on the island of Faial in the Portuguese archipelago of the Azores.

== History ==
Founded on 6 January 1923, by founding partners Jaime Maria Soares de Melo, Manuel Inácio Cardoso, João da Cruz Cristiano, João Taves, José Francisco da Câmara, José Avelar da Costa Nunes, João Caetano da Rocha, Francisco Rodrigues da Sousa, Guilherme Mederios da Rosa and Adolfo de Sousa Wenceslau.

It was the second sports club on the island of Faial created to practice football, competing directly with the Fayal Sport Clube. The interest to create a new team developed following the three football games that occurred in the summer of 1922, between Fayal Sport and the Casa Pia Atlético Clube. Further, at the time, a dissidence had developed against Fayal Sport, driving initiative for a new team.

"The idea to constitute a club in the populous parish of Angústias imposed itself. There was enthusiasm in the parish, sportsmen were not missing and interest abound, lacking, simply, a decision. The opportunity could not be lost and so they resorted to a clever politico-sporting maneuver that was unleashed. One of the most dedicated and influential partners broke away from the Fayal Sport Club. He contacted the Angustienses, joined them and soon after came the Angústias Athletic Club...Mr. Manuel Stattmiler Saldanha e Albuqueruqe, entrusted with this task, chaired the first board of the AAC (1923), withdrawing soon after and resuming his activity in FSC."

Its first president does not figure in the Machiavellian maneuver that created the club. Jaime Maria Soares de Melo, professor of Escola Normal da Horta, president of the Câmara Municipal and council administrator/provisioner of the Santa Casa da Misericórdia, was considered the Father of Atlético. It was during his term that club's anthem (with lyrics by Ana Adelina Bettencourt da Costa Nunes and music by maestro Francisco Xavier Simaria) was established, the team became public institution, and two years after its founding, an education and sport program was founded by the group.

In the following 81 years the group became an important part of the sporting culture on the island.
