= Joaquim Teixeira =

Portuguese footballer

Personal information
- Date of birth: 18 March 1917
- Place of birth: Horta, Azores, Portugal
- Position: Forward

Youth career
- 1933–1934: Angústias

Senior career*
Years	Team	Apps	(Gls)
1934–1938	Angústias		
1938–1946	Benfica	87	(66)
1946–1949	Vitória de Guimarães	60	(18)
1949–1950	O Elvas	22	(9)
1950–1954	Almada		
1954–1955	Ginásio Alcobaça		
1955–1957	Mangualde		
Total		169	(93)

International career
1945	Portugal	1	(0)
- * Club domestic league appearances and goals

Joaquim Teixeira (born 18 March 1917, date of death unknown) was a Portuguese footballer who played as a forward. Over the course of eleven seasons, he amassed Primeira Liga totals 169 matches and 93 goals, mainly at Benfica, where he won six major titles.

== Career ==
Born in Horta, in the Azorean island of Faial. Teixeira joined Angústias AC in his youth, debuting for the first team in 1934. At 21 years of age, he travelled to Lisbon for a tryout at Benfica. After impressing, he was immediately signed and joined the reserves team for short period, before manager János Biri tested him on with the main squad, in a friendly against Belenenses on 5 October 1939.

His official debut came on 14 January 1940 against Académico do Porto, in a season that ended with the conquest of the Taça de Portugal and Campeonato de Lisboa. Deployed as an inside forward, behind Julinho and Valadas, over the next six seasons, he bagged three league titles, including two consecutive, scoring 19 league goals in two seasons combined. One of his best career matches came on 16 January 1944, when he scored four goals, on a 5–4 win over Sporting. In 1945, he made his only international appearance, in a one–nill loss to Switzerland on 21 May 1945. Teixeira left Benfica in 1946 after 171 matches and 121 goals.

He joined Vitória S.C., and helped them to three top ten finishes, reuniting with his former colleague, Valadas on the last two. He played one more season on the top flight, representing O Elvas C.A.D. in 1949–50 season, before spending the remainder of his career in the lower leagues.

== Honours ==
- Primeira Liga: 1941–42, 1942–43, 1944–45
- Taça de Portugal: 1939–40, 1942–43, 1943–44
- Campeonato de Lisboa: 1939–40
