= Joaquim Alcobia =

Portuguese footballer

Alcobia
Personal information
- Full name: Joaquim Maria Alcobia
- Date of birth: 1 November 1916
- Date of death: Deceased
- Position: Midfielder

Senior career*
Years	Team	Apps	(Gls)
1935–1936	Sporting CP	12	(0)
1937–1944	Benfica	54	(0)
Total		66	(0)
- * Club domestic league appearances and goals

Joaquim Maria Alcobia (1 November 1916 – deceased) was a Portuguese footballer who played as midfielder.

== Career ==
Alcobia started at Sporting CP in 1935, but was at Benfica that he gained recognition. He arrived there in 1937 and made his debut on the league opener on 10 January 1937 with Vitória de Setúbal. Despite playing less than a handful of games, he won his first league title in the same year.

In the next three seasons, Alcobia played only one league game, as Albino or Gaspar Pinto left him little chance to play. Starting in 1940, his playing time increased and he helped Benfica win the league in 1941–42 and 1942–43, and the Taça de Portugal in 1942–43, departing the club in 1944.

== Honours ==
Benfica

- Primeira Divisão: 1936–37, 1941–42, 1942–43
- Taça de Portugal: 1942–43
- Campeonato de Lisboa: 1936–37
