= António Martins (footballer) =

Portuguese footballer (1913–?)

Personal information
- Full name: António Rodrigues Martins
- Date of birth: 27 July 1913
- Place of birth: Lisbon, Portugal
- Date of death: unknown
- Position: Goalkeeper

Senior career*
Years	Team	Apps	(Gls)
1934–1938	Sporting CP	4	(0)
1938–1947	Benfica	141	(0)
Total		145	(0)

International career
1942	Portugal	1	(0)
- * Club domestic league appearances and goals

António Rodrigues Martins (born 27 July 1913, date of death unknown) was a Portuguese footballer who played as a goalkeeper.

== Career ==
Born in Lisbon, Martins arrived at Sporting CP in 1934, as a 21-year-old, spending the first two seasons in the reserve squad. With Azevedo as undisputed starter, and four league matches in two seasons, he left the Lions in 1938, to join Benfica.

In his first season, he beat Amaro for the keeper position, debuting on 2 October 1938 in a loss against his former team. Over the course of nine seasons, he added more than 140 appearances, winning three league titles, until he lost his place to Rosa in 1946, after representing the club on 265 matches. He received one cap, in a 3–0 win against Switzerland on 1 January 1942.

== Honours ==
- Primeira Liga: 1941–42, 1942–43, 1944–45
- Taça de Portugal: 1939–40, 1942–43, 1943–44
- Campeonato de Lisboa: 1937–38, 1939–40
