= Carlos Canário =

Portuguese footballer (1918–1990)

Personal information
- Full name: Carlos Augusto Ribeiro Canário
- Date of birth: 10 February 1918
- Place of birth: Portalegre, Portugal
- Date of death: 7 September 1990 (aged 72)
- Position: Midfielder

Youth career
- 1934–1936: Estrela Portalegre

Senior career*
Years	Team	Apps	(Gls)
1936–1938	Estrela Portalegre		
1938–1952	Sporting	197	(26)

International career
1948–1951	Portugal	10	(0)
- * Club domestic league appearances and goals

Carlos Augusto Ribeiro Canário (10 February 1918 – 7 September 1990) was a Portuguese footballer who played as a midfielder for Estrela Portalegre, Sporting CP and the Portugal national team.

Born in Portalegre, he was known at Sporting as the Sexto Violino ("Sixth Violin") for his support to the five forwards known as the Cinco Violinos ("Five Violins"). His international career did not start until age 30, due to competition from Belenenses' Augusto Amaro.

Canário was awarded Sporting's Prémio Stromp in 1988. He died aged 72, shortly after watching the team.
