= Julinho (footballer, born 1919) =

Portuguese footballer

Personal information
- Full name: Júlio Correia da Silva
- Date of birth: 1 December 1919
- Place of birth: Ramalde, Portugal
- Date of death: 18 March 2010 (aged 90)
- Place of death: Lisbon, Portugal
- Position: Forward

Senior career*
| Years | Team | Apps | (Gls) |
| 1934–1940 | Boavista | | |
| 1940–1942 | Académico | 22 | (16) |
| 1942–1953 | Benfica | 144 | (153) |

International career
| 1948 | Portugal | 1 | (0) |
- * Club domestic league appearances and goals

Júlio Correia da Silva (1 December 1919 – 18 March 2010), known as Julinho, was a Portuguese footballer who played as a forward.

Over the course of 13 seasons, he amassed Primeira Liga totals of 166 games and 170 goals, mainly at Benfica, where he won six major titles.

== Career ==
Born in Ramalde, Portugal, Julinho started his career at Boavista F.C., debuting for the first-team at only 15, and staying until 1940. After a short stint at Académico F.C., he caught the attention of S.L. Benfica who signed him in 1942, despite better offers from FC Porto.

At Benfica, he went on to be part of the club's offensive line that included Mário Rui, Espírito Santo, Rogério Pipi and Arsénio, who were dubbed Os Cinco Diabos Vermelhos (The Five Red Devils). Mainly a centre forward, but could also play as inside forward, he made his debut on 11 October 1942 against Atlético and in the following eight seasons scored over 150 league goals, to help the club win three league titles.

He took part in the 12–2 trashing of Porto, on 7 February 1943, when he bagged four goals, as well, the 7–2 win against Sporting CP on 28 April 1946. He scored six in a 13–1 win against A.D. Sanjoanense on 27 April 1947, one of the highest wins ever in Primeira Liga history. Already in his thirties, he scored the winning goal against FC Girondins de Bordeaux at the Latin Cup final on 18 June 1950, and made his last appearance for Benfica on 8 March 1953 against Barreirense. With 205 goals scored in 200 matches, he remains the seventh highest goal-scorer in Benfica history.

== International career ==
Julinho was capped only once for Portugal, in a 2–0 loss against Spain on 21 March 1948 in Madrid.

== Career statistics ==
=== Club ===
Appearances and goals by club, season and competition
| Club | Season | League | | | Cup | | Total | |
| Club | Season | Division | Apps | Goals | Apps | Goals | Apps | Goals |
|---|---|---|---|---|---|---|---|---|
| Académico | 1940–41 | Segunda Divisão | | | | | | |
| Académico | 1941–42 | Primeira Divisão | 22 | 16 | | | 22 | 16 |
| Académico | Total | | 22 | 16 | | | 22 | 16 |
| Benfica | 1942–43 | Primeira Divisão | 16 | 24 | | | 16 | 24 |
| Benfica | 1943–44 | Primeira Divisão | 16 | 16 | | | 16 | 16 |
| Benfica | 1944–45 | Primeira Divisão | 13 | 14 | | | 13 | 14 |
| Benfica | 1945–46 | Primeira Divisão | 12 | 12 | | | 12 | 12 |
| Benfica | 1946–47 | Primeira Divisão | 21 | 22 | | | 21 | 22 |
| Benfica | 1947–48 | Primeira Divisão | 24 | 24 | | | 24 | 24 |
| Benfica | 1948–49 | Primeira Divisão | 14 | 11 | | | 14 | 11 |
| Benfica | 1949–50 | Primeira Divisão | 22 | 28 | | | 22 | 28 |
| Benfica | 1950–51 | Primeira Divisão | 5 | 2 | | | 5 | 2 |
| Benfica | 1951–52 | Primeira Divisão | 0 | 0 | | | 0 | 0 |
| Benfica | 1952–53 | Primeira Divisão | 1 | 0 | | | 1 | 0 |
| Benfica | Total | | 144 | 153 | | | 144 | 153 |
| Career total | | | 166 | 169 | | | 166 | 169 |

== Honours ==
=== Club ===
Benfica

- Primeira Liga: 1942–43, 1944–45, 1949–50
- Taça de Portugal: 1942–43, 1943–44
- Latin Cup: 1950

=== Individual ===
- Primeira Liga: Top Scorer 1942–43, 1949–50
- Taça de Portugal: Top Scorer 1943–44
