= Estádio do Campo Grande =

Multi-use stadium in Lisbon, Portugal

Coordinates: 38.759158°N 9.159573°W

Estádio de Campo Grande
- Interactive map of Estádio de Campo Grande
- Location: Lisbon, Portugal
- Owner: Lisboa FC (1912–1917); Sporting CP (1917–1937); S.L. Benfica (1940–1954)
- Capacity: 25,000
- Surface: grass

Construction
- Groundbreaking: 1911
- Built: 1912
- Opened: 1912
- Renovated: 1940
- Expanded: 1940
- Closed: 1954
- Demolished: 1955

Tenants
- Lisboa FC (1912–1917); Sporting CP (1917–1937); S.L. Benfica (1940–1954)

Estádio de Campo Grande was a multi-use stadium in Lisbon, Portugal. It was used mostly for football matches and hosted the home matches of Sporting CP and then S.L. Benfica. The stadium was able to hold 25,000 people and opened in 1912 owned by Lisboa FC. In 1917, Lisboa FC leaves and ground is taken over by Sporting CP which uses it until 1937, leaving for Estádio do Lumiar.

In 1941, Benfica moved in after Estádio das Amoreiras was demolished for a freeway. By then, the stadium needed renovations and was abandoned for over 3 years. It was closed in 1954 when the original Estádio da Luz opened.
