= Mário Galvão =

Portuguese footballer (born 1916)

Personal information
- Full name: Mário das Neves Galvão
- Date of birth: 2 November 1916
- Place of birth: Coimbra, Portugal
- Position: Defender

Senior career*
Years	Team	Apps	(Gls)
1935–1940	Sporting		
1941–1943	Benfica		

International career
1938	Portugal	1	(0)
- * Club domestic league appearances and goals

Mário das Neves Galvão (born 2 November 1916) was a Portuguese footballer who played defender for Sporting and Benfica in the Portuguese Liga. Galvão gained 1 cap for the Portugal national team, when he played in a 4-0 victory against Hungary in Lisbon 9 January 1938.
