= 1943–44 Primeira Divisão =

10th season of top-tier Portuguese football

Primeira Liga
- Season: 1943–44
- Champions: Sporting CP; 2nd title
- Matches played: 90
- Goals scored: 456 (5.07 per match)

The 1943–44 Primeira Liga season.

== Overview ==
Location of teams in the 1943–44 Liga

It was contested by 10 teams, and Sporting Clube de Portugal won the championship.

== League standings ==
Pos	Team	Pld	W	D	L	GF	GA	GD	Pts
1	Sporting CP (C)	18	14	3	1	61	22	+39	31
2	Benfica	18	11	4	3	57	34	+23	26
3	Atlético CP	18	9	6	3	51	28	+23	24
4	Porto	18	10	3	5	46	36	+10	23
5	Olhanense	18	10	2	6	65	34	+31	22
6	Belenenses	18	9	3	6	41	32	+9	21
7	Vitória de Setúbal	18	7	3	8	52	50	+2	17
8	Vitória de Guimarães	18	2	3	13	25	68	−43	7
9	Académica	18	3	0	15	35	68	−33	6
10	Salgueiros	18	1	1	16	23	84	−61	3

Source: rsssf.com
(C) Champions

== Results ==
Home \ Away	ACA	ACP	BEL	BEN	OLH	POR	SAL	SCP	VSE	VGU
Académica		1–2	1–3	1–4	1–3	1–5	9–4	3–4	3–9	3–2
Atlético CP	8–0		2–2	3–1	3–4	2–2	4–0	2–2	3–2	4–1
Belenenses	3–1	1–3		1–2	4–0	3–2	5–1	1–1	1–2	4–1
Benfica	2–1	2–1	1–1		6–3	5–4	6–1	5–4	5–3	5–1
Olhanense	3–2	1–1	1–0	2–2		3–1	3–1	1–3	3–0	7–3
Porto	8–2	2–0	5–0	3–2	4–2		5–1	1–2	8–0	5–1
Salgueiros	3–1	0–3	1–6	1–6	0–5	2–5		1–5	3–5	2–2
Sporting CP	2–0	2–2	6–1	1–0	2–0	3–1	10–0		3–2	6–0
Vitória de Setúbal	2–0	4–4	1–3	1–1	1–3	3–3	2–1	2–3		5–3
Vitória de Guimarães	1–5	1–4	1–2	2–2	2–2	2–1	2–1	0–2	0–8	

Legend: Blue = home team win; Yellow = draw; Red = away team win.
