= János Biri =

Hungarian footballer (1901–1983)

Personal information
- Date of birth: 21 July 1901
- Place of birth: Budapest, Austria-Hungary
- Date of death: 29 March 1983 (aged 81)
- Place of death: Budapest, Hungary
- Height: 1.82 m (6 ft 0 in)
- Position: Goalkeeper

Senior career*
Years	Team	Apps	(Gls)
1920–1925	Kispest AC	62	(2)
1925–1927	Padova	35	(0)
1927–1928	MTK Budapest	2	(0)
1928	33 FC	5	(0)
1929	Sabaria	3	(0)
1930–1931	Pécs-Baranya	18	(0)
1931–1932	Kerületi	20	(2)
1933	Amiens		
1933–1936	Boavista		

International career
1924–1934	Hungary	5	(0)

Managerial career
- 1935–1936: Porto
- 1937–1939: Académico Porto
- 1939–1947: Benfica
- 1947–1949: Estoril Praia
- 1949–1951: Guimarães
- 1951–1952: Atlético
- 1952–1955: Setúbal
- 1955–1956: Oriental
- 1956–1957: Fabril Barreiro
- 1957–1958: Oriental
- 1958: Lusitânia
- 1958–1959: Académica
- 1959–1960: Lusitano Évora
- 1960–1961: Setúbal
- 1965–1966: Lusitano Évora
- * Club domestic league appearances and goals

János Biri (21 July 1901 – 29 March 1983) was a Hungarian footballer and coach. Biri played as a goalkeeper for a number of clubs, most notably Padova and MTK Budapest FC, also representing Hungary in the 1924 Summer Olympics. He is best known for his coaching career in Portugal which spanned more than three decades.

== Career ==
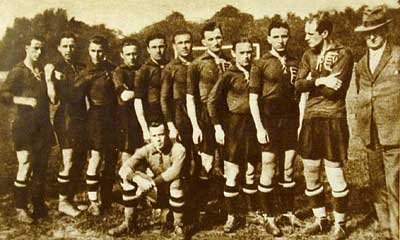
1924 Maygar team; Károly Fogl, Zoltán Opata, Ferenc Hirzer, Rudolf Jeny, József Eisenhoffer, Béla Guttmann, Gyula Mándi, Gábor Obitz, József Braun, György Orth, János Biri, and Gyula Kiss

Born in Budapest, Biri career in football started in a hometown club, Kispest AC at the age of 19. His performances earned him a place in the Hungary national team squad for the 1924 Summer Olympics. In 1925, he moved to Italy, representing Padova in the early days of what was to known as Serie A. After two seasons in Italy, he returned to Hungary, passing through several teams, without much success, having short spells in France and Portugal, retiring in 1936, at age 35.

Shortly after, Biri started coaching Porto, winning Campeonato de Porto and coming runner-up in Primeira Liga in his only season there. After a brief spell with Académico Porto, he was then hired by Benfica's President, Augusto da Fonseca Jr. In the eight seasons he spent there, he successfully challenged Sporting dominance, claiming three Primeira Liga titles and three Taça de Portugal.

He held the record for most games managed and won, for over 75 years, until Jorge Jesus surpassed him in 2014. However, he still has the highest winning percentage of any other coach with at least 100 games and the second longest reign with 8 years, after Cosme Damião. After Benfica, János managed eleven other teams, retiring as coach in 1966, after more than 30 years in managerial roles.

== Managerial record ==
Team	From	To	Record				
Team	From	To	G	W	D	L	Win %
Benfica	1 August 1939	2 July 1947	272	194	25	53	71.32

== Honours ==
Porto

- Campeonato do Porto: 1935–36

Benfica

- Primeira Liga: 1941–42, 1942–43, 1944–45
- Taça de Portugal: 1939–40, 1942–43, 1943–44
- Campeonato de Lisboa: 1939–40
