= Francisco Ferreira (footballer, born 1919) =

Portuguese footballer (1919–1986)

Personal information
- Full name: Francisco Ferreira
- Date of birth: 23 August 1919
- Place of birth: Guimarães, Portugal
- Date of death: 14 February 1986 (aged 66)
- Place of death: Lisbon, Portugal
- Position: Midfielder

Youth career
- 1932–1937: Porto

Senior career*
Years	Team	Apps	(Gls)
1937–1938	Porto	13	(0)
1938–1952	Benfica	265	(23)
Total		278	(23)

International career
1940–1951	Portugal	25	(0)
- * Club domestic league appearances and goals

Francisco "Xico" Ferreira (23 August 1919 – 14 February 1986) was a Portuguese footballer who played as a midfielder.

Over the course of 15 seasons, he amassed Primeira Liga totals of 278 games and twenty-three goals, mainly at Benfica, winning ten major titles.

He is also notable for ill-fated reasons, after a friendly in his honor between Benfica and Torino, as the Italian team returned home, their plane crashed into the Basilica of Superga, killing all aboard and ending the Grande Torino team.

== Club career ==
Born in Guimarães, Ferreira arrived at Porto at 17, he made his debut for the northerners in the 1937 Campeonato de Portugal Final, against Sporting on 4 July 1937. In the following year, in a match against Benfica on 20 February 1938, he crashed with Rogério de Sousa and broke his foot, needing three months to recover, only reappearing in another match against Benfica, on 10 April 1938.

After a disagreement with Porto's over a wage increase, in which he was told, "O Senhor ou assina ou põe-se na rua, não queremos cá malandros a pedir dinheiro." ("Sir, you either sign or get lost, because he do not want slackers asking for money.") – he moved to Benfica, debuting on 20 November 1938 in a home win against Sporting in Estádio das Amoreiras.

A powerful and energetic player, he became an undisputed player in the midfield, alongside Albino, Moreira and Jacinto Marques, assuming the captain armband from 1944 onwards, in 293 official matches. Due to his performances, he received offers from Real Madrid in 1945, and from Torino in 1949, after Ferruccio Novo had watch him compete for the national team in a 1–4 loss against Italy on 27 February 1949.

On 3 May 1949, Ferruccio Novo, sent his team to Lisbon, to play in an honorary match for him. After losing 3–4, the Italian team returned to Turin the next day, but the plane that was carrying them, crashed into the Basilica of Superga, in what became known as Superga air disaster. The five-time champions of Italy, known as Grande Torino, was destroyed. Ferreira was devastated, spending many sleepless nights, sending money to the relatives of the victims, and adding a picture with a black frame of the Grande Torino team to his personal trophy room.

Ferreira took part in the 1950 Latin Cup win, but did not play in the final due to not being physically fit, not having the title added to his count. He was, however, present in the 8–2 trashing of Porto in the opening of Estádio das Antas on 28 May 1952; ending his career eighteen days later, by lifting the club sixth Taça de Portugal in a win against Sporting. He played 398 official matches, scoring thirty-four goals, and winning four championships, and six Portuguese Cups.

== International career ==
Ferreira debuted for the Portugal national football team in a 2–3 loss against France on 28 January 1940. Over the course of eleven years, he added 25 caps, 12 of those, as captain. He made his last appearance in a draw against Belgium on 17 June 1951.

== Honours ==
Porto

- Campeonato de Portugal: 1936–37

Benfica

- Primeira Divisão: 1941–42, 1942–43, 1944–45, 1949–50
- Taça de Portugal: 1939–40, 1942–43, 1943–44, 1948–49, 1950–51, 1951–52
- Campeonato de Lisboa: 1939–40
