= Francisco Rodrigues (Portuguese footballer) =

Portuguese footballer

Personal information
- Full name: Francisco Palmeiro Rodrigues
- Date of birth: 26 July 1914
- Date of death: Deceased
- Position: Forward

Senior career*
Years	Team	Apps	(Gls)
1935–1939	Vitória Setúbal	28	(11)
1939–1942	Benfica	47	(49)
1942–1946	Vitória Setúbal	47	(54)
Total		122	(114)
- * Club domestic league appearances and goals

Francisco Palmeiro Rodrigues (26 July 1914 – date of death unknown) was a Portuguese footballer who played as a forward.

== Career ==
Rodrigues played for Benfica between 1939 and 1942, and moved to Vitória de Setúbal where he won two Bota de Prata awards (league top scorer), becoming the first player to win it two straight outright times. While at Benfica, he scored 9 goals against city rivals, Sporting CP.
