= 1941–42 Primeira Divisão =

8th season of top-tier Portuguese football

Primeira Liga
- Season: 1941–42
- Champions: Benfica; 4th title
- Matches: 132
- Goals: 695 (5.27 per match)

The 1941–42 Primeira Divisão was the eighth season of top-tier football in Portugal. At the beginning of the season, it was decided to expand the championship from 8 to 10 teams to admit Braga FA and Algarve FA champions (until this season only the top teams from Porto, Coimbra, Lisboa and Setúbal's FA were admitted). Porto finished the regional championship in third place, which did not grant entry into the Primeira Divisão. However, a Primeira Divisão second expand (from 10 to 12) in the same season was decided, which allowed the club to participate.

== Overview ==
Location of teams in the 1941–42 Divisão

It was contested by 12 teams, and S.L. Benfica won the championship.

== League standings ==
Pos	Team	Pld	W	D	L	GF	GA	GD	Pts
1	Benfica (C)	22	19	0	3	74	34	+40	38
2	Sporting CP	22	17	0	5	93	31	+62	34
3	Belenenses	22	12	6	4	66	32	+34	30
4	Porto	22	13	2	7	77	48	+29	28
5	Académica	22	13	0	9	77	51	+26	26
6	Barreirense	22	11	3	8	58	55	+3	25
7	Unidos de Lisboa	22	7	4	11	53	49	+4	18
8	Olhanense	22	6	2	14	42	83	−41	14
9	Carcavelinhos	22	5	4	13	35	73	−38	14
10	Académico	22	6	1	15	48	81	−33	13
11	Vitória de Guimarães	22	6	1	15	43	76	−33	13
12	Leça	22	5	1	16	29	82	−53	11

Source: rsssf.com
(C) Champions

== Results ==
Home \ Away	ACA	ACD	BAR	BEL	BEN	CAR	LEÇ	OLH	POR	SCP	UNL	VGU
Académica		6–3	10–1	5–2	3–1	9–1	6–2	7–1	1–0	1–2	4–1	4–3
Académico	3–2		6–0	0–2	2–4	1–1	4–0	9–0	2–4	0–3	3–2	2–0
Barreirense	6–2	8–1		1–1	0–1	2–0	2–0	3–1	3–1	0–4	3–1	11–1
Belenenses	4–0	4–2	0–1		4–0	5–2	9–0	6–2	7–3	3–1	1–1	0–1
Benfica	4–1	4–1	3–2	2–1		4–0	5–0	8–1	5–1	4–3	2–0	4–2
Carcavelinhos	1–3	6–0	2–2	2–2	1–4		3–1	2–3	3–3	0–3	0–4	2–1
Leça	1–2	2–0	2–1	1–1	2–5	0–3		3–0	2–5	0–3	4–1	3–1
Olhanense	3–2	5–2	0–2	1–1	2–3	5–1	5–2		0–2	1–6	1–2	6–2
Porto	3–2	3–1	6–2	2–3	4–1	12–1	6–1	9–1		3–0	1–1	3–2
Sporting CP	3–1	11–2	7–1	1–4	1–4	4–1	14–0	4–1	5–0		4–2	9–1
Unidos de Lisboa	2–3	10–1	2–3	2–2	2–4	2–3	2–1	3–3	4–2	1–3		5–1
Vitória de Guimarães	4–3	4–3	4–4	2–4	1–2	3–0	4–2	4–0	1–4	1–2	0–3	

Legend: Blue = home team win; Yellow = draw; Red = away team win.
