= 1943–44 Taça de Portugal =

Tournament details
- Country: Portugal
- Teams: 16

Final positions
- Champions: Benfica
- Runners-up: Estoril

Tournament statistics
- Matches played: 30

The 1943–44 Taça de Portugal was the sixth season of the Taça de Portugal (English: Portuguese Cup), the premier Portuguese football knockout competition, organized by the Portuguese Football Federation (FPF). Benfica was the defending champion and played Estoril in the final on 28 May 1944.

== Participating teams ==
=== Primeira Divisão ===
(10 Teams)

- Associação Académica de Coimbra – Organismo Autónomo de Futebol
- Atlético Clube de Portugal
- Clube de Futebol Os Belenenses
- Sport Lisboa e Benfica
- Sporting Clube Olhanense
- Futebol Clube do Porto
- Sport Comércio e Salgueiros
- Sporting Clube de Portugal
- Vitória Sport Clube "de Guimarães"
- Vitória Futebol Clube "de Setúbal"

=== Segunda Divisão ===
(6 Teams)

- Grupo Desportivo Estoril Praia
- Futebol Clube Famalicão
- Luso Sport Clube "Beja"
- Clube de Futebol União de Coimbra
- Clube de Futebol Os Unidos "de Lisboa"
- Sport Clube Vila Real

== First round ==
=== Results ===
Team 1	Agg.	Team 2	1st leg	2nd leg
Académica de Coimbra (1D)	13–3	Salgueiros (1D)	6–2	7–1
Belenenses (1D)	4–0	Atlético CP (1D)	2–0	2–0
Benfica (1D)	8–2	Lujo Beja (2D)	4–1	4–1
Estoril Praia (2D)	6–3	Unidos de Lisboa (2D)	3–2	3–1
Porto (1D)	5–3	Sporting CP (1D)	2–0	3–3
União de Coimbra (2D)	4–3	Olhanense (1D)	4–0	0–3
Vitória de Guimarães (1D)	6–4	Vila Real (2D)	4–1	2–3
Vitória de Setúbal (1D)	3–1	Famalicão (2D)	2–0	1–1

== Quarterfinals ==
=== Results ===
Team 1	Agg.	Team 2	1st leg	2nd leg
Académica de Coimbra (1D)	4–4	Vitória de Setúbal (1D)	3–1	1–3
Benfica (1D)	10–3	Belenenses (1D)	2–1	8–2
Estoril Praia (2D)	5–3	Porto (1D)	3–2	2–1
Vitória de Guimarães (1D)	8–2	União de Coimbra (2D)	1–1	7–1

== Quarterfinal play-off ==
Académica de Coimbra	3 – 0	Vitória de Setúbal

== Semifinals ==
=== Results ===
Team 1	Agg.	Team 2	1st leg	2nd leg
Benfica (1D)	7–2	Académica de Coimbra (1D)	6–1	1–1
Estoril Praia (2D)	9–1	Vitória de Guimarães (1D)	5–0	4–1

== Final ==
28 May 1944

Benfica	8 – 0	Estoril Praia

Campo das Salésias, Lisbon
