= 1942–43 Taça de Portugal =

Tournament details
- Country: Portugal
- Teams: 16

Final positions
- Champions: Benfica
- Runners-up: Vitória de Setúbal

Tournament statistics
- Matches played: 15

The 1942–43 Taça de Portugal was the fifth season of the Taça de Portugal (English: Portuguese Cup), the premier Portuguese football knockout competition, organized by the Portuguese Football Federation (FPF). Clube de Futebol Os Belenenses was the defending champion but lost in the quarter-finals to Sporting Clube de Portugal. The final was played on 20 June 1943 between Benfica and Vitória de Setúbal.

== Participating teams ==
=== Primeira Divisão ===
(10 Teams)

- Associação Académica de Coimbra – Organismo Autónomo de Futebol
- Clube de Futebol Os Belenenses
- Sport Lisboa e Benfica
- Unidos Futebol Clube " do Barreiro"
- Leixões Sport Clube
- Sporting Clube Olhanense
- Futebol Clube do Porto
- Sporting Clube de Portugal
- Clube de Futebol Os Unidos "de Lisboa"
- Vitória Sport Clube "de Guimarães"

=== Segunda Divisão ===
(6 Teams)

- Futebol Clube Barreirense
- Sporting Clube de Braga
- Leça Futebol Clube
- Sport Clube Sanjoanense
- Lusitano Futebol Clube "Vila Real de Santo António"
- Vitória Futebol Clube "de Setúbal"

== First round ==
=== Results ===
Belenenses (1D)	5 – 0	Académica de Coimbra (1D)

Benfica (1D)	7 – 1	Vitória de Guimarães (1D)

Barreirense (2D)	4 – 2	Leça (2D)

Porto (1D)	15 – 1	SC Sanjoanense (2D)

Sporting CP (1D)	4 – 1	Olhanense (1D)

Unidos do Barreiro (1D)	7 – 1	Lusitano VRSA (2D)

Unidos de Lisboa (1D)	4 – 0	Braga (2D)

Vitória de Setúbal (2D)	2 – 1	Leixões (1D)

== Quarterfinals ==
=== Results ===
Benfica (1D)	5 – 2	Unidos de Lisboa (1D)

Porto (1D)	2 – 0	Unidos do Barreiro (1D)

Sporting CP (1D)	1 – 0	Belenenses (1D)

Vitória de Setúbal (2D)	2 – 0	Barreirense (2D)

== Semifinals ==
=== Results ===
Vitória de Setúbal (2D)	7 – 0	Porto (1D)

Benfica (1D)	3 – 2	Sporting CP (1D)

== Final ==
20 June 1943

Benfica	5 – 1	Vitória de Setúbal

Estádio das Salésias, Lisbon
