= 1944–45 Primeira Divisão =

11th season of top-tier Portuguese football

Primeira Liga
- Season: 1944–45
- Champions: Benfica; 6th title
- Matches played: 90
- Goals scored: 496 (5.51 per match)

The 1944–45 Primeira Divisão was the 11th season of top-tier football in Portugal.

== Overview ==
Location of teams in the 1944–45 Liga

It was contested by 10 teams, and S.L. Benfica won the championship.

== League standings ==
Pos	Team	Pld	W	D	L	GF	GA	GD	Pts
1	Benfica (C)	18	14	2	2	79	26	+53	30
2	Belenenses	18	13	1	4	72	29	+43	27
3	Sporting CP	18	13	1	4	57	37	+20	27
4	Porto	18	9	2	7	64	48	+16	20
5	Vitória de Setúbal	18	9	1	8	44	49	−5	19
6	Estoril	18	6	4	8	44	34	+10	16
7	Olhanense	18	6	4	8	41	41	0	16
8	Vitória de Guimarães	18	4	3	11	32	57	−25	11
9	Académica	18	4	1	13	33	65	−32	9
10	Salgueiros	18	2	1	15	30	110	−80	5

(C) Champions

== Results ==
Home \ Away	ACA	BEL	BEN	EST	OLH	POR	SAL	SCP	VGU	VSE
Académica		0–3	2–6	2–2	1–0	1–3	5–1	1–2	3–0	1–2
Belenenses	15–2		1–3	2–1	1–0	3–2	14–1	2–4	4–1	3–1
Benfica	6–1	1–2		2–0	2–2	7–2	11–3	4–1	5–0	7–2
Estoril	2–1	1–2	1–1		1–2	8–1	4–0	1–2	5–2	3–1
Olhanense	8–4	4–3	1–3	0–0		2–2	4–1	2–4	3–2	3–3
Porto	2–4	2–6	4–3	2–2	5–1		9–0	3–1	10–0	3–0
Salgueiros	2–1	1–6	0–6	4–7	2–6	1–8		1–6	3–2	3–5
Sporting CP	5–3	2–1	0–2	3–2	2–0	5–4	8–2		5–2	3–0
Vitória de Guimarães	4–1	1–1	1–2	2–1	2–1	3–0	4–4	3–3		1–2
Vitória de Setúbal	2–0	2–3	3–8	5–3	3–2	1–2	4–1	4–1	4–2	

Legend: Blue = home team win; Yellow = draw; Red = away team win.
