= 1942–43 Primeira Divisão =

9th season of top-tier Portuguese football

Primeira Liga
- Season: 1942–43
- Champions: Benfica; 5th title
- Matches played: 90
- Goals scored: 539 (5.99 per match)

The 1942–43 Primeira Divisão was the ninth season of top-tier football in Portugal.

== Overview ==
Location of teams in the 1942–43 Liga

It was contested by 10 teams, and S.L. Benfica won the championship.

== League standings ==
| Pos | Team | Pld | W | D | L | GF | GA | GD | Pts |
|---|---|---|---|---|---|---|---|---|---|
| 1 | Benfica (C) | 18 | 15 | 0 | 3 | 74 | 38 | +36 | 30 |
| 2 | Sporting CP | 18 | 14 | 1 | 3 | 66 | 37 | +29 | 29 |
| 3 | Belenenses | 18 | 14 | 0 | 4 | 78 | 20 | +58 | 28 |
| 4 | Unidos de Lisboa | 18 | 9 | 2 | 7 | 70 | 46 | +24 | 20 |
| 5 | Olhanense | 18 | 8 | 2 | 8 | 44 | 48 | −4 | 18 |
| 6 | Académica | 18 | 6 | 2 | 10 | 54 | 60 | −6 | 14 |
| 7 | Porto | 18 | 5 | 4 | 9 | 40 | 56 | −16 | 14 |
| 8 | Vitória de Guimarães | 18 | 6 | 2 | 10 | 48 | 76 | −28 | 14 |
| 9 | Unidos do Barreiro (Note: CUF Barreiro was temporarily renamed Unidos Futebol Clube, commonly known as Unidos do Barreiro.) | 18 | 5 | 1 | 12 | 46 | 77 | −31 | 11 |
| 10 | Leixões | 18 | 0 | 2 | 16 | 19 | 81 | −62 | 2 |

Source: rsssf.com
(C) Champions

== Results ==
| Home \ Away | ACA | BEL | BEN | LEI | OLH | POR | SCP | UNB | UNL | VGU |
|---|---|---|---|---|---|---|---|---|---|---|
| Académica | | 2–4 | 3–4 | 8–2 | 2–6 | 5–2 | 2–7 | 7–2 | 2–3 | 4–0 |
| Belenenses | 2–0 | | 5–2 | 5–0 | 8–0 | 4–0 | 5–0 | 5–2 | 2–0 | 12–0 |
| Benfica | 6–2 | 4–2 | | 3–0 | 3–1 | 12–2 | 2–1 | 7–1 | 5–2 | 8–3 |
| Leixões | 2–2 | 2–4 | 2–4 | | 0–0 | 0–4 | 0–4 | 1–6 | 0–1 | 2–6 |
| Olhanense | 5–2 | 0–4 | 0–1 | 4–1 | | 3–0 | 1–3 | 5–1 | 4–3 | 4–3 |
| Porto | 1–1 | 3–1 | 2–4 | 5–1 | 3–2 | | 2–2 | 3–4 | 2–6 | 6–2 |
| Sporting CP | 2–4 | 2–1 | 3–2 | 4–3 | 5–1 | 5–2 | | 5–1 | 4–3 | 4–1 |
| Unidos do Barreiro | 4–2 | 0–8 | 2–3 | 6–0 | 4–5 | 1–1 | 3–7 | | 2–4 | 1–3 |
| Unidos de Lisboa | 7–4 | 0–5 | 2–3 | 8–2 | 2–0 | 0–0 | 2–4 | 9–3 | | 14–0 |
| Vitória de Guimarães | 1–2 | 3–1 | 5–1 | 7–1 | 3–3 | 3–2 | 2–4 | 2–3 | 4–4 | |

Legend: Blue = home team win; Yellow = draw; Red = away team win.
