= Philippines women's national volleyball team =

Philippines
- Nickname(s): Alas Pilipinas (lit. 'Philippine Aces')
- Association: Philippine National Volleyball Federation (PNVF)
- Confederation: AVC
- Head coach: (Italy) Angiolino Frigoni
- FIVB ranking: 56 ▼9 (2 October 2026)

Uniforms
Home	Away	Third

World Championship
- Appearances: 2 (1974, 2029)
- Best result: 18th (1974)

Asian Volleyball Championship
- Appearances: 11 (First in 1983)
- Best result: 5th (1983)
Honours
Event	1st	2nd	3rd
AVC Cup	0	1	1
SEA Games	6	3	4
SEA V Cup	0	1	6
Total	6	5	11
Medal record
Asian Nations Cup
Silver medal – second place	2025 Hanoi	Team
Bronze medal – third place	2024 Manila	Team
SEA Games
Gold medal – first place	1977 Kuala Lumpur	Team
Gold medal – first place	1979 Jakarta	Team
Gold medal – first place	1981 Manila	Team
Gold medal – first place	1985 Bangkok	Team
Gold medal – first place	1987 Jakarta	Team
Gold medal – first place	1993 Singapore	Team
Silver medal – second place	1983 Singapore	Team
Silver medal – second place	1995 Chang Mai	Team
Silver medal – second place	1997 Jakarta	Team
Bronze medal – third place	1991 Manila	Team
Bronze medal – third place	2001 Kuala Lumpur	Team
Bronze medal – third place	2003 Hanoi	Team
Bronze medal – third place	2005 Manila	Team
SEA V Cup
Silver medal – second place	2026 Chiang Mai	Team
Bronze medal – third place	2019 Nakhon Ratchasima / Santa Rosa	Team
Bronze medal – third place	2024 Vĩnh Phúc / Nakhon Ratchasima	Team
Bronze medal – third place	2025 Nakhon Ratchasima / Ninh Bình	Team

The Philippines women's national volleyball team represents the Philippines in international volleyball competitions and friendly matches, governed by the Philippine National Volleyball Federation since 2021.

Philippines' highest achievement was qualifying for and competing at the FIVB Women's Volleyball World Championship in the 1974 edition, where they finished at 18th place.

== History ==
The Philippine national team was formerly organized and sanctioned by the Philippine Volleyball Federation (PVF), originally known as the Philippine Amateur Athletic Federation (PAVA) from 1961 to 2003. The team was a regional powerhouse in Southeast Asia, having won gold medals at the 1977, 1979, 1981, 1985, 1987 and 1993 editions of the Southeast Asian Games. The Philippines also had its first and only FIVB Volleyball World Championship participation in 1974.

The national team had its last gold medal finish at the Southeast Asian Games under Russian-Latvian head coach Staņislavs Lugailo, who was part of the Soviet Union men's national team that won gold at the 1964 Tokyo Olympics and was hired to lead the team in 1990. He further guided the team to a bronze medal finish at the 1991 Southeast Asian Games. The team later had a training camp in Japan in 1992, where it played games against Japanese volleyball clubs. Lyugailo led the national team to win another gold medal finish at the Southeast Asian Games in 1993 after defeating defending champions Thailand in the final. Thailand would later defeat the Philippines in the next gold medal match in the Games' 1995 edition. The Philippines failed to duplicate its gold medal games for the next editions of the Southeast Asian Games, with Thailand establishing dominance in women's volleyball in the region.

The Philippine national team did not see international play after the 2005 edition of the Southeast Asian Games and the Asian Championships. They won a bronze medal at the 2005 Southeast Asian Games. They would make a comeback at the Asian Championships in 2013 and at the Southeast Asian Games in 2015 respectively.

In 2014, the PVF lost recognition by the Philippine Olympic Committee after a leadership crisis. The Fédération Internationale de Volleyball (FIVB) recognized the Larong Volleyball sa Pilipinas, Inc. (LVPI) as its provisional member in 2015, effectively taking over the PVF's mandate. The LVPI was allowed to send and organize national volleyball teams, including the women's team, to FIVB tournaments in the next few years.

After failing to get a podium finish at the 2015 Southeast Asian Games, it was decided that the national team coached by Roger Gorayeb would be disbanded. However, it was later decided that Gorayeb would remain as coach of the national team's participation in another tournament, the 2015 VTV International Women's Volleyball Cup. The team was without many of its players that played in the Southeast Asian Games and finished last out of six teams.

In 2021, the Philippine National Volleyball Federation (PNVF) was formed and was given full FIVB membership, replacing the LVPI as the volleyball federation for volleyball in the Philippines.

The Philippines secured their first ever podium finish in an AVC tournament when they finished as third placers in the 2024 AVC Women's Challenge Cup, which was hosted by Manila. They progressed further at the 2025 AVC Women's Volleyball Nations Cup losing to host Vietnam in the final. However this feat is the first-ever finals appearance in an AVC-sanctioned tournament for a Philippine volleyball team (men's or women's) with their finals appearance in a tournament was back at the 1997 SEA Games.

However, the PNVF was suspended in May 2026 and was placed under the management of an FIVB-appointed ad hoc committee. They nevertheless took part at the 2026 AVC Women's Volleyball Cup in Candon under the supervision of the transitional body.

== Team image ==
=== Names ===
Nicknames
Nickname	In use
Bomberinas/V-Belles	2013
Amihan	2015
Alas Pilipinas	2024–present

In 2013, the national team was called "Bomberinas" or "V-Belles". Bomberinas derives from some selections came from Cagayan Valley Bomberinas, and "V-Belles" came from a Shakey's V-League selection represented the country in the 2014 FIVB Women's World Championship qualifier.

The most well-known preceding moniker for the women's team, Amihan, was short-lived. It has a literal meaning of a northeast monsoon, a common season in the Philippines. It could also mean the famous Filipino methodological figure with the same name, considered to be the genderless God of the Wind. It was adopted in 2015 when the national team was still under the Philippine Volleyball Federation and team sponsor PLDT Inc. Due to the Philippine Volleyball Federation leadership issue and the formation of its successor, Larong Volleyball sa Pilipinas, the monicker and the initial pool the PVF built for the 2015 SEA Games was later disbanded.

The Philippine women's national team is known by their moniker "Alas Pilipinas", with Alas meaning "Ace" in Filipino. The nickname is an official designation by the Philippine National Volleyball Federation in partnership with sponsor Cignal TV. Adopted on May 15, 2024, the moniker is shared with all national indoor and beach volleyball teams of the Philippines, including the youth teams.

== Results ==
=== FIVB-sanctioned tournaments ===
Tournament	Appearances	Finishes				
Tournament	Appearances	Champions	Runners-up	Third place	Fourth place	Total
FIVB Women's Volleyball World Championship	1	0	0	0	0	0
FIVB Women's Volleyball Challenger Cup	1	0	0	0	0	0
Asian Women's Volleyball Championship	11	0	0	0	0	0
AVC Women's Volleyball Cup	3	0	1	1	0	2
SEA V Cup	11	0	1	6	4	11
Total	27	0	2	7	4	13

=== Other regional tournaments ===
Tournament	Appearances	Finishes				
Tournament	Appearances	Champions	Runners-up	Third place	Fourth place	Total
Asian Women's Volleyball Cup (defunct)	2	0	0	0	0	0
Asian Games	5	0	0	0	2	2
Asian Games (Nine-a-side) (defunct)	1	0	0	0	1	1
SEA Games	19	6	3	4	6	19
Total	27	6	3	4	9	22

== FIVB Senior World Ranking ==
The new calculation method of the FIVB Senior World Rankings started on January 1, 2019, granted all nations automatic world ranking (WR) 100 points, in addition to the score from the previous FIVB World Ranking. The new calculation provides that any inactive nation every January 1 will lose 50 WR points for the next year. An inactive team reaching a WR score of less than 20 WR points will be removed from the ranking list. Due to inactivity or non-participation in annual FIVB-sanctioned events since 2019, the Philippines lost 100 WR points and was removed from the world rankings. The Philippine women's national volleyball team became active again in an FIVB-sanctioned event during the 2023 AVC Women's Challenge Cup, hence their reinstatement in the world rankings with 50 WR points.

=== Annual rankings ===
As of August 10, 2025

Key
Best Ranking
Best Mover
Worst Ranking
Worst Mover

Philippines' FIVB Senior Women's World Ranking History
Year	World Ranking		AVC Ranking		Year-end WR Score	Games Played	Won	Lost	Best		Worst	
Year	Rank	Move	Rank	Move	Year-end WR Score	Games Played	Won	Lost	Rank	Move	Rank	Move
2025	46	▲12	8	Steady	76.16	13	7	6	46	▲12	52	Steady
2024	58	▲8	8	▲4	46.77	7	5	2	55	▲11	64	▼1
2023	66	▲156	12	▲5	39.91	11	4	7	57	▲165	72	▼15

=== Summary of competitions ===
The following table shows the summary of competitions of the Philippines women's national volleyball team in every FIVB-sanctioned event, where it shows the team's standings, results, and the changes in their world ranking score before and after the competition.

Philippines' Summary of Competitions
Event	Host	Rank	Record (W-L)	Pre. WR score	Post. WR score	Pre. World ranking	Post. World ranking	Biggest Win (Pts.)	Biggest Defeat (Pts.)
2026 SEA V.Cup (Leg 2)	(Thailand) Chiang Mai	2nd	2–1	57.02	66.97 ▲	66	53 ▲	Vietnam (6.02) ▲	—N/a
2026 SEA V.Cup (Leg 1)	(Vietnam) Hanoi	4th	0–3	62.34	57.02 ▼	61	65 ▼	—N/a	Indonesia (3.75) ▼
2026 AVC Cup	(Philippines) Candon	8th	2–4	76.16	62.34 ▼	48	58 ▼	Kyrgyzstan (6.03) ▲	Iran (6.64) ▼
2025 SEA V.League (Leg 2)	(Vietnam) Ninh Bình	3rd	1–2	74.16	76.16 ▲	46	46	Indonesia (6.46) ▲	Vietnam (4.46) ▼
2025 SEA V.League (Leg 1)	(Thailand) Nakhon Ratchasima	3rd	1–2	71.78	74.16 ▲	47	46 ▲	Indonesia (4.97) ▲	Vietnam (2.59) ▼
2025 Asian Nations Cup	(Vietnam) Hanoi	2nd	5–2	46.77	71.78 ▲	52	46 ▲	Kazakhstan (10.20) ▲	Vietnam (5.01) ▼
2024 FIVB Challenger Cup	(Philippines) Manila	7th	0–1	50.23	46.77 ▼	55	56 ▼	—N/a	Vietnam (3.45) ▼
2024 Asian Challenge Cup	(Philippines) Manila	3rd	5–1	39.91	50.23 ▲	64	55 ▲	Chinese Taipei (2.99) ▲	Kazakhstan (1.60) ▼
2023 Asian Championship	(Thailand) Nakhon Ratchasima	13th	1–4	48.43	39.91 ▼	57	63 ▼	Uzbekistan (7.83) ▲	Hong Kong (9.18) ▼
2023 Asian Challenge Cup	(Indonesia) Gresik	7th	3–3	50.00^{a}	48.43 ▼	N/A	57 ▲	Macau (2.46) ▲	Indonesia (2.69) ▼

Note
a.The 50 points are guaranteed with the intent to compete but are yet to be reinstated in the world rankings before the competition.

== Fixtures and results ==
2026 results

Opponent	Date	Result	Set						WR Pts.^{[2]}	Event	Location
Opponent	Date	Result	1	2	3	4	5	Total	WR Pts.^{[2]}	Event	Location
Uzbekistan	June 6, 2026	3–0	25–16	25–12	25–14			75–42	+4.85	2026 AVC Women's Volleyball Cup	Candon, Philippines
Australia	June 7, 2026	2–3	22–25	25–23	25–18	15–25	11–15	98–106	-5.8	2026 AVC Women's Volleyball Cup	Candon, Philippines
Kyrgyzstan	June 8, 2026	3–0	25–9	25–11	25–17			75–37	+6.03	2026 AVC Women's Volleyball Cup	Candon, Philippines
South Korea	June 9, 2026	0–3	16–25	18–25	22–25			56–75	-6.32	2026 AVC Women's Volleyball Cup	Candon, Philippines
Chinese Taipei	June 11, 2026	0–3	16–25	14–25	10–25			40–75	-5.94	2026 AVC Women's Volleyball Cup	Candon, Philippines
Iran	June 14, 2026	0–3	21–25	12–25	21–25			54–75	-6.64	2026 AVC Women's Volleyball Cup	Candon, Philippines
Vietnam	July 31, 2026	1–3	27–29	17–25	25–20	19–25		88–99	-1.57	2026 SEA Women's V Cup – First Leg	Hanoi, Vietnam
Thailand	August 1, 2026	2–3	17–25	25–19	15–25	25–18	10–15	92–102	—N/a	2026 SEA Women's V Cup – First Leg	Hanoi, Vietnam
Indonesia	August 2, 2026	1–3	25–20	19–25	22–25	16–25		82–95	-3.75	2026 SEA Women's V Cup – First Leg	Hanoi, Vietnam
Thailand	August 7, 2026	0–3	19–25	17–25	19–25			55–75	—N/a	2026 SEA Women's V Cup – Second Leg	Chiang Mai, Thailand
Vietnam	August 8, 2026	3–1	22–25	25–23	25–21	25–22		97–91	+6.02	2026 SEA Women's V Cup – Second Leg	Chiang Mai, Thailand
Indonesia	August 9, 2026	3–1	25–13	23–25	25–19	33–31		106–88	+3.93	2026 SEA Women's V Cup – Second Leg	Chiang Mai, Thailand
China	September 16, 2026								—N/a	2026 Asian Games	Komaki and Okazaki, Japan
Kazakhstan	September 17, 2026								—N/a	2026 Asian Games	Komaki and Okazaki, Japan
Qatar	September 20, 2026								—N/a	2026 Asian Games	Komaki and Okazaki, Japan
Mongolia	September 21, 2026								—N/a	2026 Asian Games	Komaki and Okazaki, Japan
Hong Kong	September 22, 2026								—N/a	2026 Asian Games	Komaki and Okazaki, Japan

== Competition record ==
=== World Championship ===
World Championship record									Qualification record								
Year	Round	Position	Pld	W	L	SW	SL	Squad	Year	Round	Position	Pld	W	L	SW	SL	Squad
(Mexico) 1974	Round Robin	18th place	11	2	9	7	27	Squad	—N/a								
(Japan) 1998	Did not qualify								(South Korea) 1997	Pool Round	4th in Group	3	0	3	0	9	No info
(Japan) 2006	Did not qualify								(Thailand) 2005	Pool Round	4th in Group	4	1	3	3	9	Squad
(Italy) 2014	Did not qualify								(Vietnam) 2013	Zonal Round	3rd in Group	3	1	2	3	7	Squad
(Thailand) 2025	Did not qualify								2023 Asian Championship served as qualification event								
(United States) (Canada) 2027	Did not qualify								2026 AVC Continental Championship served as qualification event								
(Philippines) 2029	Qualified as host								Qualified as host								
Total	0 Title(s)		12	2	9	7	27	—				10	2	8	6	25	—

=== Challenger Cup ===
Challenger Cup record (Defunct)
Year	Round	Position	Pld	W	L	SW	SL	Squad
(Philippines) 2024	Quarterfinal Round	7th place	1	0	1	0	3	Squad
Total	0 Title(s)		1	0	1	0	3	—

=== Asian Championship ===
Asian Championship record
Year	Round	Position	Pld	W	L	SW	SL	Squad
(Australia) 1975	Did not participate							
(Hong Kong) 1979	Did not participate							
(Japan) 1983	Round Robin	5th Place	No Info					
(China) 1987	Did not participate							
(Hong Kong) 1989	Did not participate							
(Thailand) 1991	Round Robin	13th Place	No Info					
(China) 1993	Round Robin	13th Place	No Info					
(Thailand) 1995	Did not participate							
(Philippines) 1997	Round Robin	8th Place	5	0	5	1	15	No Info
(Hong Kong) 1999	Did not participate							
(Vietnam) 2003	Classification Round	8th Place	8	1	7	3	20	No Info
(China) 2005	Classification Round	9th Place	8	1	7	3	20	No Info
(Thailand) 2007	Did not participate							
(Vietnam) 2009	Did not participate							
(Taiwan) 2011	Did not participate							
(Thailand) 2013	Classification Round	12th Place	7	2	5	7	17	Squad
(China) 2015	Classification Round	12th Place	7	2	5	8	18	Squad
(Philippines) 2017	Classification Round	8th Place	7	2	5	8	16	Squad
(South Korea) 2019	Qualified but Withdrew							
(Philippines) 2021	Cancelled							
(Thailand) 2023	Classification Round	13th Place	5	1	4	7	12	Squad
(China) 2026	Did not qualify							
Total	0 Title(s)							—

=== AVC Cup (2008–2022) ===
AVC Cup record (Defunct)
Year	Round	Position	Pld	W	L	SW	SL	Squad
(Thailand) 2018	Classification Round	9th place	5	2	3	11	12	Squad
(Philippines) 2022	Classification Round	6th place	7	3	4	10	15	Squad
Total	0 Title(s)		12	5	7	21	27	—

=== AVC Cup ===
AVC Cup record
Year	Round	Position	Pld	W	L	SW	SL	Squad
(Hong Kong) 2018	Qualified for the Asian Cup; Not relegated to the Challenge Cup							
(Thailand) 2022	Qualified for the Asian Cup; Not relegated to the Challenge Cup							
(Indonesia) 2023	Classification Round	7th place	6	3	3	10	12	Squad
(Philippines) 2024	Bronze medal match	3rd place	6	5	1	15	5	Squad
(Vietnam) 2025	Final Round	Runners up	7	5	2	17	9	Squad
(Philippines) 2026	Classification Round	8th place	6	2	4	8	12	
Total	0 Title(s)		25	15	10	50	38	—

=== Asian Games ===
Asian Games record
Year	Round	Position	Pld	W	L	SW	SL	Squad
(Indonesia) 1962	Round Robin	4th place	3	0	3	2	9	No Info
(Thailand) 1966	Round Robin	4th place	5	2	3	4	12	No Info
(Thailand) 1970	Round Robin	6th place	6	1	2	3	6	No Info
(India) 1982	Round Robin	5th place	5	1	4	3	12	No Info
(Indonesia) 2018	Classification Round	8th place	7	1	6	7	19	Squad
(China) 2022	Did not participate							
(Japan) 2026	Classification Round	9th place	5	3	2	10	6	Squad
Total	0 Title(s)		31	8	20	29	64	—

=== Asian Games: Nine-a-side ===
Asian Games: Nine-a-side volleyball record (Defunct)
Year	Round	Position	Pld	W	L	SW	SL	Squad
(Indonesia) 1962	Round Robin	4th Place	3	0	3	2	9	No Info
Total	0 Title(s)		3	0	3	12	9	—

=== SEA Games ===
SEA Games record
Year	Round	Position	Pld	W	L	SW	SL	Squad
(Malaysia) 1977	Final Round	Champions	No info					
(Indonesia) 1979	Final Round	Champions	No info					
(Philippines) 1981	Final Round	Champions	No info					
(Singapore) 1983	Final Round	Runners Up	No info					Squad
(Thailand) 1985	Final Round	Champions	No info					
(Indonesia) 1987	Final Round	Champions	No info					
(Malaysia) 1989	Final Round	4th Place	No info					
(Philippines) 1991	Bronze medal match	3rd Place	No info					
(Singapore) 1993	Final Round	Champions	Squad					
(Thailand) 1995	Final Round	Runners Up	No info					
(Indonesia) 1997	Final Round	Runners Up	No info					
(Brunei) 1999	Not Held							
(Malaysia) 2001	Bronze medal match	3rd Place	4	3	1	11	7	No info
(Vietnam) 2003	Bronze medal match	3rd Place	7	4	3	14	13	Squad
(Philippines) 2005	Bronze medal match	3rd Place	4	2	2	7	7	Squad
(Thailand) 2007	Did not participate							
(Laos) 2009	Did not participate							
(Indonesia) 2011	Did not participate							
(Myanmar) 2013	Did not participate							
(Singapore) 2015	Group Stage	5th Place	3	1	2	3	6	Squad
(Malaysia) 2017	Bronze medal match	4th Place	4	1	3	4	9	Squad
(Philippines) 2019	Bronze medal match	4th Place	4	0	4	5	12	Squad
(Vietnam) 2021	Bronze medal match	4th Place	5	1	4	5	12	Squad
(Cambodia) 2023	Bronze medal match	4th Place	5	2	3	7	9	Squad
(Thailand) 2025	Bronze medal match	4th Place	4	1	3	4	9	Squad
Total	6 Titles							—

=== SEA V Cup ===
SEA V Cup record
Year	Round	Position	Pld	W	L	SW	SL	Squad
(Thailand) 2019 1st Leg	Round Robin	3rd Place	3	1	2	6	8	Squad
(Philippines) 2019 2nd Leg	Round Robin	3rd Place	3	1	2	4	6	Squad
(Thailand) 2022 Final Leg	Round Robin	4th Place	3	0	3	0	9	Squad
(Vietnam) 2023 1st Leg	Round Robin	4th Place	3	0	3	1	9	Squad
(Thailand) 2023 2nd Leg	Round Robin	4th Place	3	0	3	2	9	Squad
(Vietnam) 2024 1st Leg	Round Robin	3rd Place	3	1	2	4	7	Squad
(Thailand) 2024 2nd Leg	Round Robin	3rd Place	3	1	2	3	8	Squad
(Thailand) 2025 1st Leg	Round Robin	3rd Place	3	1	2	5	7	Squad
(Vietnam) 2025 2nd Leg	Round Robin	3rd Place	3	1	2	4	6	Squad
(Vietnam) 2026 1st Leg	Round Robin	4th Place	3	0	3	4	9	Squad
(Thailand) 2026 2nd Leg	Round Robin	Runners-up	3	2	1	6	5	Squad
Total	0 Title(s)		33	8	25	39	83	—

=== Other Tournaments ===
Other tournament records
Year	Round	Position	Pld	W	L	SW	SL	Squad
(Vietnam) 2007 VTV Cup	Round Robin	10th place	No Info					
(Vietnam) 2015 VTV Cup	Round Robin	6th place	6	1	5	4	14	Squad
(Vietnam) 2025 VTV Cup	Semifinal Round	4th place	6	3	3	10	10	Squad
Total	0 Title(s)							—

== Head-to-head record ==
This page shows the Philippines women's national volleyball team's head-to-head record from 2000 to present.

Head-to-head record
Opponent	GP	MW	ML	SW	SL	LM
Australia	10	4	6	21	20	June 7, 2026
Cambodia	1	1	0	3	0	May 9, 2023
China	7	0	7	0	21	September 16, 2026
Chinese Taipei	6	2	4	6	14	June 11, 2026
Hong Kong	6	5	1	15	5	September 22, 2026
India	6	3	3	9	13	May 24, 2024
Indonesia	27	11	16	47	61	August 9, 2026
Iran	8	3	5	13	19	June 14, 2026
Japan	1	0	1	0	3	August 21, 2018
Kazakhstan	14	3	11	20	36	September 17, 2026
Kyrgyzstan	1	1	0	3	0	June 8, 2026
Macau	1	1	0	3	0	June 19, 2023
Malaysia	5	5	0	15	1	May 13, 2022
Mongolia	3	2	1	7	3	September 21, 2026
Myanmar	2	2	0	6	1	September 17, 2013
New Zealand	1	1	0	3	0	June 11, 2025
North Korea	1	0	1	0	3	September 2, 2005
Qatar	1	1	0	3	0	September 20, 2026
Singapore	4	4	0	12	0	December 12, 2025
South Korea	7	1	6	4	18	June 9, 2026
Sri Lanka	2	2	0	6	3	May 24, 2015
Thailand	23	0	23	6	69	August 7, 2026
Tonga	1	1	0	3	0	August 1, 2006
Vietnam	27	4	23	25	73	August 8, 2026
Uzbekistan	3	3	0	9	1	June 6, 2026

== Team ==
=== Current squad ===
The following is the team's final roster for the 2026 Asian Games.

Philippine women's national volleyball team for the 2026 Asian Games
Position	Name	Date of birth	Height	2025-26 team
OH	Mhicaela Belen	June 29, 2002 (age 24)	1.73 m (5 ft 8 in)	(Philippines) Capital1 Solar Spikers
OH	Angel Canino	June 25, 2003 (age 23)	1.80 m (5 ft 11 in)	(Philippines) De La Salle Lady Spikers
OH	Ejiya Laure	March 21, 1999 (age 27)	1.75 m (5 ft 9 in)	(Philippines) Choco Mucho Flying Titans
OH	Shaina Nitura	November 18, 2004 (age 21)	1.75 m (5 ft 9 in)	(Philippines) Adamson Lady Falcons
OP	Alyssa Jae Solomon	December 14, 2001 (age 24)	1.87 m (6 ft 2 in)	(Japan) Osaka Marvelous
MB	Thea Gagate	July 26, 2000 (age 26)	1.88 m (6 ft 2 in)	(Philippines) Zus Coffee Thunderbelles
MB	Dell Palomata	November 1, 1995 (age 30)	1.90 m (6 ft 3 in)	(Philippines) PLDT High Speed Hitters
MB	Amie Provido	February 5, 2004 (age 22)	1.80 m (5 ft 11 in)	(Philippines) De La Salle Lady Spikers
MB	Niña Ytang	January 24, 2002 (age 24)	1.76 m (5 ft 9 in)	(Philippines) UP Fighting Maroons
S	Julia Melissa De Guzman (c)	May 10, 1995 (age 31)	1.70 m (5 ft 7 in)	(Philippines) Creamline Cool Smashers
S	Mars Alba	August 26, 1999 (age 27)	1.68 m (5 ft 6 in)	(Philippines) Akari Chargers
L	Justine Jazareno	March 25, 2000 (age 26)	1.58 m (5 ft 2 in)	(Philippines) Akari Chargers

Coaching Staff
Position	Name
Head coach	(Japan) Takayuki Minowa
Assistant coach	(Philippines) Juvie Mangaring
Assistant coach	(Philippines) Karlo Martin Santos
Assistant coach	(Philippines) Krishea Torres

=== Former squads ===
The following squads competed in major competitions: the Olympics, FIVB World Cup, Asian Games, AVC Championship, and SEA Games.

Asian Games squads

==== 2018 Asian Games ====
Philippines (2018 Asian Games)

Philippines roster (2018 Asian Games)
No.	Pos.	Name	Date of birth	Height	Weight	Spike	Block	Current Club/College
2	OH	Alyssa Valdez	June 29, 1993 (age 33)	1.75 m (5 ft 9 in)	60 kg (130 lb)	305 cm (10 ft 0 in)	282 cm (9 ft 3 in)	(Philippines) Creamline Cool Smashers
3	OH	Jaja Santiago	January 20, 1996 (age 30)	1.96 m (6 ft 5 in)	65 kg (143 lb)	320 cm (10 ft 6 in)	302 cm (9 ft 11 in)	(Philippines) Foton Tornadoes
5	L	Dawn Macandili	May 31, 1996 (age 30)	1.53 m (5 ft 0 in)	50 kg (110 lb)	246 cm (8 ft 1 in)	234 cm (7 ft 8 in)	(Philippines) F2 Logistics Cargo Movers
6	OP	Mylene Paat	April 5, 1994 (age 32)	1.80 m (5 ft 11 in)	66 kg (146 lb)	285 cm (9 ft 4 in)	274 cm (9 ft 0 in)	(Philippines) Cignal HD Spikers
8	MB	Mika Reyes	June 21, 1994 (age 32)	1.83 m (6 ft 0 in)	61 kg (134 lb)	283 cm (9 ft 3 in)	279 cm (9 ft 2 in)	(Philippines) Petron Blaze Spikers
9	S	Kim Fajardo	September 30, 1993 (age 33)	1.70 m (5 ft 7 in)	59 kg (130 lb)	275 cm (9 ft 0 in)	265 cm (8 ft 8 in)	(Philippines) F2 Logistics Cargo Movers
10	MB	Maika Ortiz	August 30, 1991 (age 35)	1.78 m (5 ft 10 in)	70 kg (150 lb)	290 cm (9 ft 6 in)	295 cm (9 ft 8 in)	(Philippines) Foton Tornadoes
11	OH	Cha Cruz-Behag	March 11, 1988 (age 38)	1.72 m (5 ft 7 1/2 in)	60 kg (130 lb)			(Philippines) F2 Logistics Cargo Movers
12	S	Jia Morado	May 10, 1995 (age 31)	1.68 m (5 ft 6 in)	54 kg (119 lb)			(Philippines) Creamline Cool Smashers
13	L	Denden Lazaro	January 21, 1992 (age 34)	1.65 m (5 ft 5 in)	56 kg (123 lb)	251 cm (8 ft 3 in)	247 cm (8 ft 1 in)	(Philippines) COCOLIFE Asset Managers
14	MB	Majoy Baron	December 10, 1995 (age 30)	1.81 m (5 ft 11 1/2 in)	59 kg (130 lb)	287 cm (9 ft 5 in)	272 cm (8 ft 11 in)	(Philippines) F2 Logistics Cargo Movers
15	OP	Kim Kianna Dy	July 26, 1995 (age 31)	1.80 m (5 ft 11 in)	57 kg (126 lb)	280 cm (9 ft 2 in)	270 cm (8 ft 10 in)	(Philippines) F2 Logistics Cargo Movers
16	OH	Dindin Santiago-Manabat	September 26, 1993 (age 33)	1.91 m (6 ft 3 in)	65 kg (143 lb)	284 cm (9 ft 4 in)	270 cm (8 ft 10 in)	(Philippines) Foton Tornadoes
18	MB	Aby Maraño (C)	December 22, 1992 (age 33)	1.75 m (5 ft 9 in)	54 kg (119 lb)	280 cm (9 ft 2 in)	280 cm (9 ft 2 in)	(Philippines) F2 Logistics Cargo Movers

MH Middle Hitter OP Opposite Hitter OH Outside Hitter MB Middle Blocker S Setter L Libero R Reserve

Coaching staff

- Head Coach:
  (Philippines) Cesael delos Santos
- Assistant Coach(s):
  (Philippines) Emilio Reyes Jr.
  (Philippines) Brian Esquibel

Team staff

- Team Manager:
- Team Utility:

Medical staff

- Team Physician:
- Physical Therapist/Trainer:

Asian Women's Volleyball Championship squads

==== 2023 Asian Women's Volleyball Championship ====
Philippines (2023 Asian Women's Volleyball Championship)

Philippine Women's National Volleyball Team for 2023 Asian Women's Volleyball Championship
Position	Name	Date of birth	Height	Current team
OH	Bella Belen	June 29, 2002 (age 24)	1.71 m (5 ft 7 in)	(Philippines) NU Lady Bulldogs
OH	Vange Alinsug	February 18, 2003 (age 23)	1.66 m (5 ft 5 in)	(Philippines) NU Lady Bulldogs
OH	Arah Ellah Panique	August 1, 2004 (age 22)	1.80 m (5 ft 11 in)	(Philippines) NU Lady Bulldogs
OH	Myrtle Escanlar	July 21, 2003 (age 23)	1.66 m (5 ft 5 in)	(Philippines) NU Lady Bulldogs
OH	Natasza Kaye Bombita	January 14, 2005 (age 21)	1.70 m (5 ft 7 in)	(Philippines) NU Lady Bulldogs
MB	Lorene Toring	February 17, 2000 (age 26)	1.87 m (6 ft 2 in)	(Philippines) Adamson Lady Falcons
MB	Minierva Maaya	July 10, 2002 (age 24)	1.78 m (5 ft 10 in)	(Philippines) NU Lady Bulldogs
MB	Niña Ytang	January 24, 2002 (age 24)	1.85 m (6 ft 1 in)	(Philippines) UP Fighting Maroons
MB/OP	Erin Pangilinan	October 12, 2001 (age 25)	1.70 m (5 ft 7 in)	(Philippines) NU Lady Bulldogs
OP	Alyssa Solomon	December 14, 2001 (age 24)	1.85 m (6 ft 1 in)	(Philippines) NU Lady Bulldogs
S	Camilla Lamina (c)	April 23, 2002 (age 24)	1.66 m (5 ft 5 in)	(Philippines) NU Lady Bulldogs
S	Abegail Pono	September 12, 2004 (age 22)	1.69 m (5 ft 7 in)	(Philippines) NU Lady Bulldogs
L	Shaira Jardio	October 27, 2003 (age 22)	1.50 m (4 ft 11 in)	(Philippines) NU Lady Bulldogs
L	Pearl Ann Denura	October 24, 2000 (age 26)	1.49 m (4 ft 11 in)	(Philippines) NU Lady Bulldogs

The following persons were assigned by the Philippine National Volleyball Federation as part of the coaching staff.

Coaching Staff
Position	Name
Head coach	(Brazil) Jorge de Brito
Assistant coach 1	(Philippines) Karl Dimaculangan
Assistant coach 2	(Philippines) Norman Miguel
Trainer	(Philippines) Grace Gomez
Team manager	(Philippines) Ma. Fe Moran

==== 2017 Asian Women's Volleyball Championship ====
Philippines (2017 Asian Women's Volleyball Championship)

Philippines (2017 Asian Women's Volleyball Championship) – LVPI
No.	Pos	Name	Date of birth	Height	Weight	Spike	Block	Current Club/College
1	S	Rhea Dimaculangan	March 21, 1991 (age 35)	1.70 m (5 ft 7 in)	66 kg (146 lb)	266 cm (105 in)	256 cm (101 in)	(Philippines) Petron Blaze Spikers
2	OH	Alyssa Valdez	June 29, 1993 (age 33)	1.75 m (5 ft 9 in)	60 kg (130 lb)	305 cm (120 in)	282 cm (111 in)	(Philippines) Creamline Cool Smashers
3	MB	Jaja Santiago	January 20, 1996 (age 30)	1.96 m (6 ft 5 in)	65 kg (143 lb)	320 cm (130 in)	302 cm (119 in)	(Philippines) Foton Tornadoes
5	MB	Mika Reyes (c)	June 21, 1994 (age 32)	1.83 m (6 ft 0 in)	61 kg (134 lb)	283 cm (111 in)	279 cm (110 in)	(Philippines) Petron Blaze Spikers
6	OP	Jovelyn Gonzaga	October 31, 1991 (age 34)	1.72 m (5 ft 7 1/2 in)	61 kg (134 lb)	273 cm (107 in)	274 cm (108 in)	(Philippines) Cignal HD Spikers
7	OH	Frances Molina	September 24, 1994 (age 32)	1.80 m (5 ft 11 in)	61 kg (134 lb)	280 cm (110 in)	275 cm (108 in)	(Philippines) Petron Blaze Spikers
8	OP	Aiza Maizo-Pontillas	February 29, 1988 (age 38)	1.78 m (5 ft 10 in)	68 kg (150 lb)	280 cm (110 in)	275 cm (108 in)	(Philippines) Petron Blaze Spikers
9	S	Kim Fajardo	September 30, 1993 (age 33)	1.70 m (5 ft 7 in)	59 kg (130 lb)	275 cm (108 in)	265 cm (104 in)	(Philippines) F2 Logistics Cargo Movers
10	MB	Maika Ortiz	August 30, 1991 (age 35)	1.80 m (5 ft 11 in)	70 kg (150 lb)	290 cm (110 in)	295 cm (116 in)	(Philippines) Foton Tornadoes
11	OP	Kim Kianna Dy	July 26, 1995 (age 31)	1.80 m (5 ft 11 in)	57 kg (126 lb)	280 cm (110 in)	270 cm (110 in)	(Philippines) F2 Logistics Cargo Movers
12	MB	Geneveve Casugod	January 12, 1994 (age 32)	1.85 m (6 ft 1 in)	72 kg (159 lb)	271 cm (107 in)	268 cm (106 in)	(Philippines) Generika-Ayala Lifesavers
13	L	Denden Lazaro	January 21, 1992 (age 34)	1.65 m (5 ft 5 in)	56 kg (123 lb)	251 cm (99 in)	247 cm (97 in)	(Philippines) Cocolife Asset Managers
15	L	Dawn Macandili	May 31, 1996 (age 30)	1.53 m (5 ft 0 in)	50 kg (110 lb)	246 cm (97 in)	234 cm (92 in)	(Philippines) F2 Logistics Cargo Movers
16	MB	Aby Maraño	December 22, 1992 (age 33)	1.75 m (5 ft 9 in)	54 kg (119 lb)	280 cm (110 in)	270 cm (110 in)	(Philippines) F2 Logistics Cargo Movers

MH Middle Hitter OP Opposite Hitter OH Outside Hitter MB Middle Blocker S Setter L Libero R Reserve

Coaching staff

- Head Coach:
  Francis Vicente
- Assistant Coach(s):
  Brian Esquibel
  Zenaida Chavez

Team staff

- Team Manager:
  Danilo E. Ignacio
- Team Utility:

Medical staff

- Team Physician:
  Raul Alcantara
- Physical Therapist/Trainer:
  Ronald Dulay
  Emilio Reyes

==== 2015 Asian Women's Volleyball Championship ====
Philippines (2015 Asian Women's Volleyball Championship)

Philippines (18th Asian Women's Championship) – LVPI
No.	Player	Ht.	College	Club (PSL)	Position
3	Angelique Dionela	1.50 m (4 ft 11 in)	UPHSD	Cignal HD Spikers	Libero
4	Carmina Aganon	1.70 m (5 ft 7 in)	NU	Petron Blaze Spikers	Outside hitter
5	Melissa Gohing	1.59 m (5 ft 2 1/2 in)	DLSU	Philips Gold Lady Slammers	Libero
6	Jeanette Panaga	1.80 m (5 ft 11 in)	CSB	Cignal HD Spikers	Middle blocker
7	Michele Gumabao (c)	1.76 m (5 ft 9 1/2 in)	DLSU	Philips Gold Lady Slammers	Opposite hitter
10	Iris Tolenada	1.74 m (5 ft 8 1/2 in)	San Francisco State	Philips Gold Lady Slammers	Setter
11	Ma. Lourdes Clemente	1.85 m (6 ft 1 in)	UPHSD	Cignal HD Spikers	Middle blocker
13	Kim Kianna Dy	1.78 m (5 ft 10 in)	DLSU	Shopinas.com Lady Clickers	Middle blocker
14	Ma. Abigail Praca	1.70 m (5 ft 7 in)	USJ-R	Mane 'n Tail Lady Stallions	Middle blocker
15	Ivy Jisel Perez	1.75 m (5 ft 9 in)	NU	Petron Blaze Spikers	Setter
17	Myla Pablo	1.76 m (5 ft 9 1/2 in)	NU	Philips Gold Lady Slammers	Outside hitter
18	Frances Molina	1.80 m (5 ft 11 in)	San Beda	Petron Blaze Spikers	Middle Hitter/Outside Hitter

Coaching staff

- Head Coach:
  (Philippines) Sinfronio "Sammy" Acaylar (CIG)
- Assistant Coach(s):
  (Philippines) Francis Vicente (PHG)
  (Philippines) Rosemarie Prochina (MNT)
  (Philippines) Benson Bocboc (SHP)

Team Staff

- Team Manager:
- Team Utility:

Medical Staff

- Team Physician:
- Physical Therapist:
  (Philippines) Marie Ong

==== 2013 Asian Women's Volleyball Championship ====
Philippines (2013 Asian Women's Volleyball Championship)

Philippines (2013 Asian Women's Volleyball Championship)
No.	Player	Height	Club	Position
1	Aiza Maizo-Pontillas	1.78 m (5 ft 10 in)	Cagayan Valley Lady Rising Suns	Opposite Hitter
2	Angeli Tabaquero (C)	1.74 m (5 ft 8 1/2 in)	Cagayan Valley Lady Rising Suns	Outside Hitter
3	Angelique Dionela	1.50 m (4 ft 11 in)	Cagayan Valley Lady Rising Suns	Libero
6	Jennifer May Macatuno	1.57 m (5 ft 2 in)	Adamson Lady Falcons	Setter
7	Wenneth Eulalio	1.75 m (5 ft 9 in)	Cagayan Valley Lady Rising Suns	Middle Blocker
10	Pau Soriano	1.70 m (5 ft 7 in)	Cagayan Valley Lady Rising Suns	Middle Blocker
12	Analyn Joy Benito	1.68 m (5 ft 6 in)	Cagayan Valley Lady Rising Suns	Outside Hitter
14	Tatan Pantone	1.68 m (5 ft 6 in)	Adamson Lady Falcons	Libero
15	Royse Tubino	1.75 m (5 ft 9 in)	Cignal HD Spikers	Middle Blocker
16	Danika Yolanda Gendrauli	1.70 m (5 ft 7 in)	Cignal HD Spikers	Opposite Hitter
17	Chie Saet	1.65 m (5 ft 5 in)	Cagayan Valley Lady Rising Suns	Setter
18	Michelle Pauline Datuin	1.72 m (5 ft 7 1/2 in)	Cignal HD Spikers	Middle Blocker

Coaching staff

- Head Coach:
  (Philippines) Ernesto Pamilar
- Assistant Coach:
  (Philippines) Norman Miguel

Team staff

- Team Manager:
- Team Utility:

Medical staff

- Team Physician:
- Physical Therapist:

SEA Games squads

==== 2025 SEA Games ====
Philippines (2025 Southeast Asian Games)

Philippine women's national volleyball team for the 33rd Southeast Asian Games
Position	Name	Date of birth	Height	Current team
OH	Shaina Nitura	November 18, 2004 (age 21)	1.75 m (5 ft 9 in)	(Philippines) Adamson Lady Falcons
OH	Bella Belen	June 29, 2002 (age 24)	1.71 m (5 ft 7 in)	(Philippines) Capital1 Solar Spikers
OH	Angel Canino	June 25, 2003 (age 23)	1.80 m (5 ft 11 in)	(Philippines) De La Salle Lady Spikers
OH	Eya Laure	March 21, 1999 (age 27)	1.75 m (5 ft 9 in)	Free agent
OH	Vanie Gandler	December 5, 2000 (age 25)	1.75 m (5 ft 9 in)	(Philippines) Cignal Super Spikers
OP	Alyssa Solomon	December 14, 2001 (age 24)	1.83 m (6 ft 0 in)	(Japan) Osaka Marvelous
MB	Maddie Madayag	February 7, 1998 (age 28)	1.80 m (5 ft 11 in)	(Philippines) Choco Mucho Flying Titans
MB	Dell Palomata	November 1, 1995 (age 30)	1.90 m (6 ft 3 in)	(Philippines) PLDT High Speed Hitters
MB	Amie Provido	February 4, 2004 (age 22)	1.80 m (5 ft 11 in)	(Philippines) De La Salle Lady Spikers
S	Jia de Guzman (c)	May 10, 1995 (age 31)	1.62 m (5 ft 4 in)	(Philippines) Creamline Cool Smashers
S	Mars Alba	August 26, 1999 (age 27)	1.67 m (5 ft 6 in)	(Philippines) Akari Chargers
S	Julia Coronel	October 5, 2001 (age 25)	1.76 m (5 ft 9 in)	(Philippines) Galeries Tower Highrisers
L	Dawn Macandili-Catindig	June 1, 1996 (age 30)	1.53 m (5 ft 0 in)	(Philippines) Cignal Super Spikers
L	Justine Jazareno	March 25, 2000 (age 26)	1.62 m (5 ft 4 in)	(Philippines) Akari Chargers

The following persons were assigned by the Philippine National Volleyball Federation as part of the coaching staff.

Coaching Staff
Position	Name
Head coach	(Brazil) Jorge de Brito
Assistant coach 1	(Philippines) Eduardo Ortega
Assistant coach 2	(Philippines) Jerome Guhit
Assistant coach 3	(Philippines) Karlo Martin Santos
Assistant coach 4	(Philippines) Benson Bocboc
Physical preparation coach	(Philippines) Justin Aquino
Statistician	(Philippines) Joyce Palad
Physiotherapist	(Philippines) Krishea Torres
Team coordinator	(Philippines) Angelica Bautista
Team manager	(Philippines) Hollie Reyes

==== 2023 SEA Games ====
Philippines (2023 Southeast Asian Games)

Philippine Women's National Volleyball Team for 32nd Southeast Asian Games
Position	Name	Date of birth	Height	Current team
OH	Alyssa Valdez (c)	June 29, 1993 (age 33)	1.75 m (5 ft 9 in)	(Philippines) Creamline Cool Smashers
OH	Tots Carlos	July 7, 1998 (age 28)	1.75 m (5 ft 9 in)	(Philippines) Creamline Cool Smashers
OH	Jema Galanza	November 28, 1996 (age 29)	1.70 m (5 ft 7 in)	(Philippines) Creamline Cool Smashers
OH	Glaudine Troncoso	October 13, 1997 (age 29)	1.77 m (5 ft 10 in)	(Philippines) Cignal HD Spikers
MB	Celine Domingo	April 20, 1999 (age 27)	1.78 m (5 ft 10 in)	(Philippines) Creamline Cool Smashers
MB	Dell Palomata	November 1, 1995 (age 30)	1.91 m (6 ft 3 in)	(Philippines) PLDT High Speed Hitters
MB	Cherry Nunag	October 22, 1992 (age 34)	1.80 m (5 ft 11 in)	(Philippines) Choco Mucho Flying Titans
OP	Michele Gumabao	September 2, 1992 (age 34)	1.77 m (5 ft 10 in)	(Philippines) Creamline Cool Smashers
OP	Mylene Paat	April 5, 1994 (age 32)	1.80 m (5 ft 11 in)	(Philippines) Chery Tiggo Crossovers
OP	Kat Tolentino	January 27, 1995 (age 31)	1.85 m (6 ft 1 in)	(Philippines) Choco Mucho Flying Titans
S	Jia de Guzman	May 10, 1995 (age 31)	1.70 m (5 ft 7 in)	(Philippines) Creamline Cool Smashers
S	Gel Cayuna	August 17, 1998 (age 28)	1.68 m (5 ft 6 in)	(Philippines) Cignal HD Spikers
L	Kyla Atienza	April 12, 1997 (age 29)	1.65 m (5 ft 5 in)	(Philippines) Creamline Cool Smashers
L	Bang Pineda	January 21, 1991 (age 35)	1.68 m (5 ft 6 in)	(Philippines) Akari Chargers

The following persons were assigned by the Philippine National Volleyball Federation as part of the coaching staff.

Coaching Staff
Position	Name
Head coach	(Brazil) Jorge Edson
Assistant coach 1	(Philippines) Sherwin Meneses
Assistant coach 2	(Philippines) Cherry Rose Macatangay
Trainer	(Philippines) Raffy Mosuela
S&C coach	(Philippines) Grace Gomez
Team manager	(Philippines) Ma. Fe Moran

==== 2021 Southeast Asian Games ====
Philippines (2021 Southeast Asian Games)

Philippine Women's National Volleyball Team for 2021 Southeast Asian Games
No.	Name	Position	Date of birth	Height	Current team
1	Kyle Negrito	S	December 15, 1996 (age 29)	1.72 m (5 ft 8 in)	(Philippines) Creamline Cool Smashers
2	Aby Maraño (c)	MB	December 22, 1992 (age 33)	1.75 m (5 ft 9 in)	(Philippines) F2 Logistics Cargo Movers
3	Jaja Santiago	MB	January 20, 1996 (age 30)	1.96 m (6 ft 5 in)	free agent
5	Dawn Macandili	L	June 1, 1996 (age 30)	1.53 m (5 ft 0 in)	(Philippines) F2 Logistics Cargo Movers
6	Frances Molina	OH	September 24, 1994 (age 32)	1.75 m (5 ft 9 in)	(Philippines) Cignal HD Spikers
7	Mylene Paat	OP	October 5, 1994 (age 32)	1.80 m (5 ft 11 in)	(Philippines) Chery Tiggo 7 Pro Crossovers
8	Kath Arado	L	May 22, 1998 (age 28)	1.65 m (5 ft 5 in)	(Philippines) PLDT High Speed Hitters
10	Majoy Baron	MB	December 10, 1995 (age 30)	1.83 m (6 ft 0 in)	(Philippines) F2 Logistics Cargo Movers
13	Dell Palomata	MB	November 1, 1995 (age 30)	1.90 m (6 ft 3 in)	(Philippines) PLDT High Speed Hitters
15	Alyssa Valdez	OH	June 29, 1993 (age 33)	1.75 m (5 ft 9 in)	(Philippines) Creamline Cool Smashers
18	Ria Meneses	MB	October 18, 1995 (age 31)	1.85 m (6 ft 1 in)	(Philippines) Cignal HD Spikers
20	Kat Tolentino	OP	January 27, 1995 (age 31)	1.85 m (6 ft 1 in)	(Philippines) Choco Mucho Flying Titans
28	Jessica Galanza	OH	November 28, 1996 (age 29)	1.70 m (5 ft 7 in)	(Philippines) Creamline Cool Smashers
32	Iris Tolenada	S	August 21, 1991 (age 35)	1.75 m (5 ft 9 in)	(Philippines) F2 Logistics Cargo Movers

The following persons were assigned by the Philippine National Volleyball Federation as part of the coaching staff.

Coaching Staff
Position	Name
Head Coach	(Brazil) Jorge Edson
Assistant Coach 1	(Philippines) Odjie Mamon
Assistant Coach 2	(Philippines) Grace Antigua
Trainer 1	(Philippines) Raffy Mosuela
Trainer 2	(Philippines) Tina Salak
Strength and Conditioning Coach	(Brazil) Jose Salles Neto
Physical Therapist	(Philippines) Grace Gomez
PNVF NT Commissioner	(Philippines) Tony Boy Liao

==== 2019 Southeast Asian Games ====
Philippines (2019 Southeast Asian Games)

No.	Name	Position	Height	Weight	Spike	Block	Club
2	Alyssa Valdez	Outside Hitter	1.75 m (5 ft 9 in)	60 kg (130 lb)	305 cm (10 ft 0 in)	282 cm (9 ft 3 in)	(Philippines) Creamline Cool Smashers
3	Mika Reyes	Middle Blocker	1.83 m (6 ft 0 in)	61 kg (134 lb)	283 cm (9 ft 3 in)	279 cm (9 ft 2 in)	(Philippines) Sta. Lucia Lady Realtors
4	Kath Arado	Libero	1.65 m (5 ft 5 in)	55 kg (121 lb)	254 cm (8 ft 4 in)	252 cm (8 ft 3 in)	(Philippines) Generika-Ayala Lifesavers
5	Dawn Macandili	Libero	1.53 m (5 ft 0 in)	50 kg (110 lb)	246 cm (8 ft 1 in)	234 cm (7 ft 8 in)	(Philippines) F2 Logistics Cargo Movers
6	Frances Molina	Outside Hitter	1.80 m (5 ft 11 in)	61 kg (134 lb)	280 cm (9 ft 2 in)	275 cm (9 ft 0 in)	(Philippines) Petron Blaze Spikers
7	Mylene Paat	Opposite Hitter	1.80 m (5 ft 11 in)	66 kg (146 lb)	285 cm (9 ft 4 in)	274 cm (9 ft 0 in)	(Philippines) Cignal HD Spikers
8	Aiza Maizo-Pontillas	Opposite Hitter	1.78 m (5 ft 10 in)	68 kg (150 lb)	280 cm (9 ft 2 in)	275 cm (9 ft 0 in)	(Philippines) Petron Blaze Spikers
9	Eya Laure	Outside Hitter	1.79 m (5 ft 10 in)	70 kg (150 lb)	288 cm (9 ft 5 in)	285 cm (9 ft 4 in)	(Philippines) Foton Tornadoes
10	Majoy Baron	Middle Blocker	1.81 m (5 ft 11 1/2 in)	59 kg (130 lb)	287 cm (9 ft 5 in)	272 cm (8 ft 11 in)	(Philippines) F2 Logistics Cargo Movers
12	Jia Morado	Setter	1.70 m (5 ft 7 in)	54 kg (119 lb)	278 cm (9 ft 1 in)	272 cm (8 ft 11 in)	(Philippines) Creamline Cool Smashers
15	Jovelyn Gonzaga	Opposite Hitter	1.73 m (5 ft 8 in)	61 kg (134 lb)	273 cm (8 ft 11 in)	274 cm (9 ft 0 in)	(Philippines) Cignal HD Spikers
17	Maddie Madayag	Middle Blocker	1.79 m (5 ft 10 in)	60 kg (130 lb)	288 cm (9 ft 5 in)	282 cm (9 ft 3 in)	(Philippines) Choco Mucho Flying Titans
18	Aby Maraño (C)	Middle Blocker	1.75 m (5 ft 9 in)	54 kg (119 lb)	280 cm (9 ft 2 in)	280 cm (9 ft 2 in)	(Philippines) F2 Logistics Cargo Movers
19	Rhea Dimaculangan	Setter	1.70 m (5 ft 7 in)	55 kg (121 lb)	266 cm (8 ft 9 in)	256 cm (8 ft 5 in)	(Philippines) Generika-Ayala Lifesavers

Coaching staff

- Head Coach:
  (Philippines) Cesael delos Santos
- Assistant Coach(s):
  (Philippines) Erickson Ramos

Team staff

- Team Manager:
- Team Utility:

Medical staff

- Team Physician:
- Physical Therapist/Trainer:

==== 2017 Southeast Asian Games ====
Philippines (2017 Southeast Asian Games)

Philippines (2017 Southeast Asian Games) – LVPI
No.	Pos	Name	Date of birth	Height	Weight	Spike	Block	Current Club/College
1	S	Rhea Dimaculangan	March 21, 1991 (age 35)	1.70 m (5 ft 7 in)	66 kg (146 lb)	266 cm (105 in)	256 cm (101 in)	(Philippines) Petron Blaze Spikers
2	OH	Alyssa Valdez	June 29, 1993 (age 33)	1.75 m (5 ft 9 in)	60 kg (130 lb)	283 cm (111 in)	279 cm (110 in)	(Philippines) Creamline Cool Smashers
3	MB	Jaja Santiago	January 20, 1996 (age 30)	1.96 m (6 ft 5 in)	65 kg (143 lb)	280 cm (110 in)	277 cm (109 in)	(Philippines) Foton Tornadoes
5	MB	Mika Reyes (c)	June 21, 1994 (age 32)	1.83 m (6 ft 0 in)	61 kg (134 lb)	283 cm (111 in)	279 cm (110 in)	(Philippines) Petron Blaze Spikers
6	OP	Jovelyn Gonzaga	October 31, 1991 (age 34)	1.72 m (5 ft 7 1/2 in)	61 kg (134 lb)	273 cm (107 in)	274 cm (108 in)	(Philippines) Cignal HD Spikers
7	OH	Frances Molina	September 24, 1994 (age 32)	1.80 m (5 ft 11 in)	61 kg (134 lb)	280 cm (110 in)	275 cm (108 in)	(Philippines) Petron Blaze Spikers
8	OP	Aiza Maizo-Pontillas	February 29, 1988 (age 38)	1.78 m (5 ft 10 in)	68 kg (150 lb)	280 cm (110 in)	275 cm (108 in)	(Philippines) Petron Blaze Spikers
9	S	Kim Fajardo	September 30, 1993 (age 33)	1.70 m (5 ft 7 in)	59 kg (130 lb)	275 cm (108 in)	265 cm (104 in)	(Philippines) F2 Logistics Cargo Movers
10	MB	Maika Ortiz	August 30, 1991 (age 35)	1.80 m (5 ft 11 in)	70 kg (150 lb)	290 cm (110 in)	295 cm (116 in)	(Philippines) Foton Tornadoes
12	MB	Geneveve Casugod	January 12, 1994 (age 32)	1.85 m (6 ft 1 in)	72 kg (159 lb)	271 cm (107 in)	268 cm (106 in)	(Philippines) Generika-Ayala Lifesavers
15	L	Dawn Macandili	May 31, 1996 (age 30)	1.53 m (5 ft 0 in)	50 kg (110 lb)	246 cm (97 in)	234 cm (92 in)	(Philippines) F2 Logistics Cargo Movers
16	MB	Aby Maraño	December 22, 1992 (age 33)	1.75 m (5 ft 9 in)	54 kg (119 lb)	280 cm (110 in)	270 cm (110 in)	(Philippines) F2 Logistics Cargo Movers

MH Middle Hitter OP Opposite Hitter OH Outside Hitter MB Middle Blocker S Setter L Libero R Reserve

Coaching staff

- Head Coach:
  Francis Vicente
- Assistant Coach(s):
  Brian Esquibel
  Zenaida Chavez

Team staff

- Team Manager:
  Danilo E. Ignacio
- Team Utility:

Medical staff

- Team Physician:
  Raul Alcantara
- Physical Therapist/Trainer:
  Ronald Dulay
  Emilio Reyes

(source Archived August 9, 2017, at the Wayback Machine)

==== 2015 Southeast Asian Games ====
Philippines (2015 Southeast Asian Games)

Philippines (28th Southeast Asian Games) – LVPI
No.	Player	Ht.	College	Club	Position
1	Rhea Dimaculangan	1.72 m (5 ft 7 1/2 in)	UST	Philippine Air Force Air Spikers	Setter
2	Alyssa Valdez	1.75 m (5 ft 9 in)	ADMU	PLDT Home Ultera Ultra Fast Hitters (women)	Outside Hitter
3	Jaja Santiago	1.95 m (6 ft 5 in)	NU	PLDT Home Ultera Ultra Fast Hitters (women)]]	Middle Blocker/Hitter
5	Grethcel Soltones	1.70 m (5 ft 7 in)	SSC-R	PLDT Home Ultera Ultra Fast Hitters (women)]]	Outside Hitter
8	Aby Maraño	1.75 m (5 ft 9 in)	DLSU	Petron Blaze Spikers; Meralco Power Spikers	Middle Blocker/Hitter
9	Jovelyn Gonzaga (c)	1.72 m (5 ft 7 1/2 in)	CPU	Philippine Army Lady Troopers	Opposite/Utility
10	Maika Ortiz	1.80 m (5 ft 11 in)	UST	Philippine Air Force Air Spikers	Middle Blocker/Hitter
12	Jia Morado	1.70 m (5 ft 7 in)	ADMU	–	Setter
13	Denden Lazaro	1.57 m (5 ft 2 in)	ADMU	PLDT Home Ultera Ultra Fast Hitters (women)]]	Libero
16	Dindin Santiago-Manabat	1.88 m (6 ft 2 in)	NU	Petron Blaze Spikers; Philippine Army Lady Troopers	Utility
18	Rachel Daquis	1.78 m (5 ft 10 in)	FEU	Philippine Army Lady Troopers; Petron Blaze Spikers	Outside Hitter

Coaching staff

- Head Coach:
  (Philippines) Roger Gorayeb
- Assistant Coach(s):
  (Thailand) Anusorn Bundit
  (Philippines) Aiza Maizo-Pontillas

Team staff

- Team Manager:
- Team Utility:

Medical staff

- Team Physician:
- Physical Therapist:

==== 2005 Southeast Asian Games ====
Philippines (2005 Southeast Asian Games)
- (Philippines) Manila 2005 — Bronze medal
  Tina Salak, Ging Balse, Rubie De Leon, Maureen Penetrante, Cherry Rose Macatangay, Michelle Carolino, Mayeth Carolino, Joanna Botor, Amy Guanco, Roxanne Pimentel, Monica Aleta
- Head coach: Ramil De Jesus

==== 2003 Southeast Asian Games ====
Philippines (2003 Southeast Asian Games)
- (Vietnam) Hanoi 2003 — Bronze medal
  Tina Salak, Ging Balse, Inoferio Bridget Tolentino, Fulo Annaelixa Venus, Cherry Rose Macatangay,, Tabuena Cecille Naig, Roxanne Pimentel, Rubie De Leon, Laborte Michelle Padrillan, Pintolo Glenda Echarri, Mayeth Carolino, Michelle Carolino

==== 1993 Southeast Asian Games ====
Philippines (1993 Southeast Asian Games)
- (Philippines) Singapore 1993 — Gold medal
  Thelma Barina-Rojas, Natalie Cruz, Nene Ybañez-Chavez, Rosemarie Molit-Prochina, Arlene Apostol, Bernadette Burcelis, Leonora Escollante, Josie Vasquez, Cynthia Villarias, Liza Paglinawan, Joanne Tavera, and Elvira Garovillas
- Head coach: (Ukraine) Stanislav Lugailo

==== 1983 Southeast Asian Games ====
Philippines (1983 Southeast Asian Games)
- Singapore 1983 — Silver medal
  Lita Dela Cruz, Grace R. Antigua, Julie Dela Cruz, Thelma Barina, Josefina Paulita, Josefin Maranga, Ma. Lourdes Jao, Violeta Rastullo, Noraida Lorosa, Arlene Apostol, Ofelia Tamonan, Lynette Amancio

== Team captains ==
The following players served as team captains of the senior national team:

- Tina Salak – 2005–2006
- Angeli Tabaquero – 2013
- Rubie De Leon – 2014
- Michele Gumabao – 2015 (2015 Asian Women's Volleyball Championship)
- Jovelyn Gonzaga – 2015 (2015 SEA Games)
- Mika Reyes – 2017
- Aby Maraño – 2018–2021
- Aiza Maizo-Pontillas – 2023 (2023 AVC Women's Challenge Cup)
- Camilla Lamina – 2023 (2023 SEA Women's V.League; 2023 Asian Women's Volleyball Championship)
- Jia de Guzman – 2022; 2024–2025, 2026-present
- Alyssa Valdez – 2023 (2023 SEA Games); 2026 (2026 AVC Women's Volleyball Cup)

== Coaches ==
The following were head coaches of the senior national team:

List of head coaches of the Philippines
Nationality	Name	Period	Notes	Ref.
Philippines	Augusto Santamaria	1981–1987		
Philippines	Constante Reyes	1987–1990		
Soviet Union; Ukraine	Stanislav Lugailo	1990–1993	Soviet nationality until 1991; Ukrainian nationality from 1991	
Philippines	Ramil de Jesus	2005		
Philippines	Nes Pamilar	2013		
Philippines	Roger Gorayeb	2013, 2015		
Philippines	Francis Vicente	2017		
Philippines	Ramil de Jesus	2018		
Philippines	Shaq delos Santos	2018–2021		
Philippines	Sherwin Meneses	2022	Meneses coached the Philippine team for the 2022 Asian Women's Volleyball Cup and 2022 ASEAN Grand Prix, as the national team is composed of the team he coached in the professional league – the Creamline Cool Smashers.	
Philippines	Odjie Mamon	2021		
Brazil	Jorge de Brito	2021–2025		
Thailand	Tai Bundit	2026	Bundit remained unable to coach after sustaining injuries in a vehicle accident in Thailand in May 2026.	
Philippines	Shaq delos Santos	2026	Assistant coach Delos Santos stepped in as interim head coach for the 2026 AVC Women's Volleyball Cup following head coach Bundit's accident in Thailand.	
Japan	Taka Minowa	2026		
Italy	Angiolino Frigoni	2026–present		

== Former notable players ==
- Aby Maraño
- Aiza Maizo-Pontillas
- Alyssa Valdez
- Angeli Tabaquero
- Angelique Dionela
- Arlene Apostol-Ladimo
- Bernadette Burcelis
- Rachel Daquis
- Cha Cruz-Behag
- Chie Saet
- Cherry Rose Macatangay
- Tina Salak
- Cynthia Arceo
- Denden Lazaro-Revilla
- Dindin Santiago-Manabat
- Elvira Garovillas
- Frances Molina
- Ging Balse
- Grace Antigua
- Grethcel Soltones
- Jan Buquid
- Joanna Botor
- Josie Vasquez
- Kalei Mau
- Kath Arado
- Kim Fajardo
- Kim Kianna Dy
- Kyla Atienza
- Leonora Escolante
- Liza Paglinawan
- Maika Ortiz
- Majoy Baron
- Maureen Penetrante
- Mayeth Carolino
- Michele Gumabao
- Michelle Carolino
- Mika Reyes
- Monica Aleta
- Myla Pablo
- Mylene Paat
- Natalie Cruz
- Nory Laroza
- Jaja Santiago
- Jeanette Panaga
- Joanne Tavera-Tomacruz
- Jovelyn Gonzaga
- Pau Soriano
- Rachel Daquis
- Rhea Dimaculangan
- Ria Meneses
- Rosemarie Molit-Prochina
- Roxanne Pimentel
- Rubie De Leon
- Sue Roces
- Tatan Gata-Pantone
- Teresita Abundo
- Thelma Barina-Rojas
- Vangie de Jesus
- Zenaida Ybañez-Chavez

== See also ==
- Women's
  - Philippines women's national under-23 volleyball team
  - Philippines women's national under-21 volleyball team
  - Philippines women's national under-19 volleyball team
  - Philippines women's national under-17 volleyball team
  - Philippines women's national beach volleyball team
- Men's
  - Philippines men's national volleyball team
  - Philippines men's national under-23 volleyball team
  - Philippines men's national under-19 volleyball team
  - Philippines men's national beach volleyball team
- Philippines national volleyball teams in FIVB club tournaments
- Premier Volleyball League
- Philippine Super Liga
- Volleyball in the Philippines
