= Manuel Vilarinho =

Portuguese businessman (born 1948)

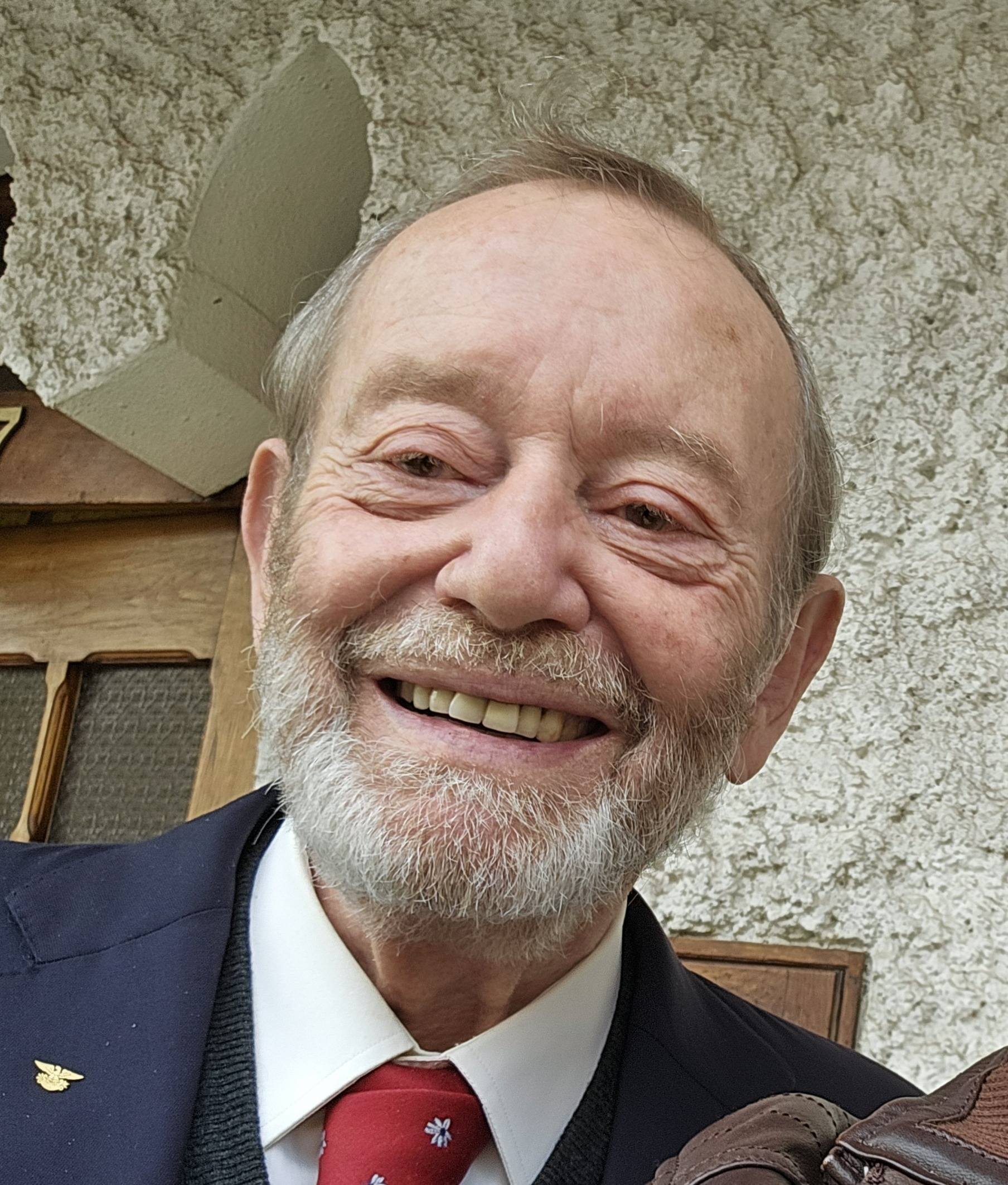

32nd President of Benfica
- In office 2000–2003
- Preceded by: João Vale e Azevedo
- Succeeded by: Luís Filipe Vieira

Personal details
- Born: 23 June 1948 (age 78) Lisbon, Portugal
- Spouse: Mariana Correia da Costa Pereira Caldas
- Occupation: Businessman

Manuel Lino Rodrigues Vilarinho (born 23 June 1948) is a Portuguese businessman who was the 32nd president of sports club S.L. Benfica.

== Benfica ==
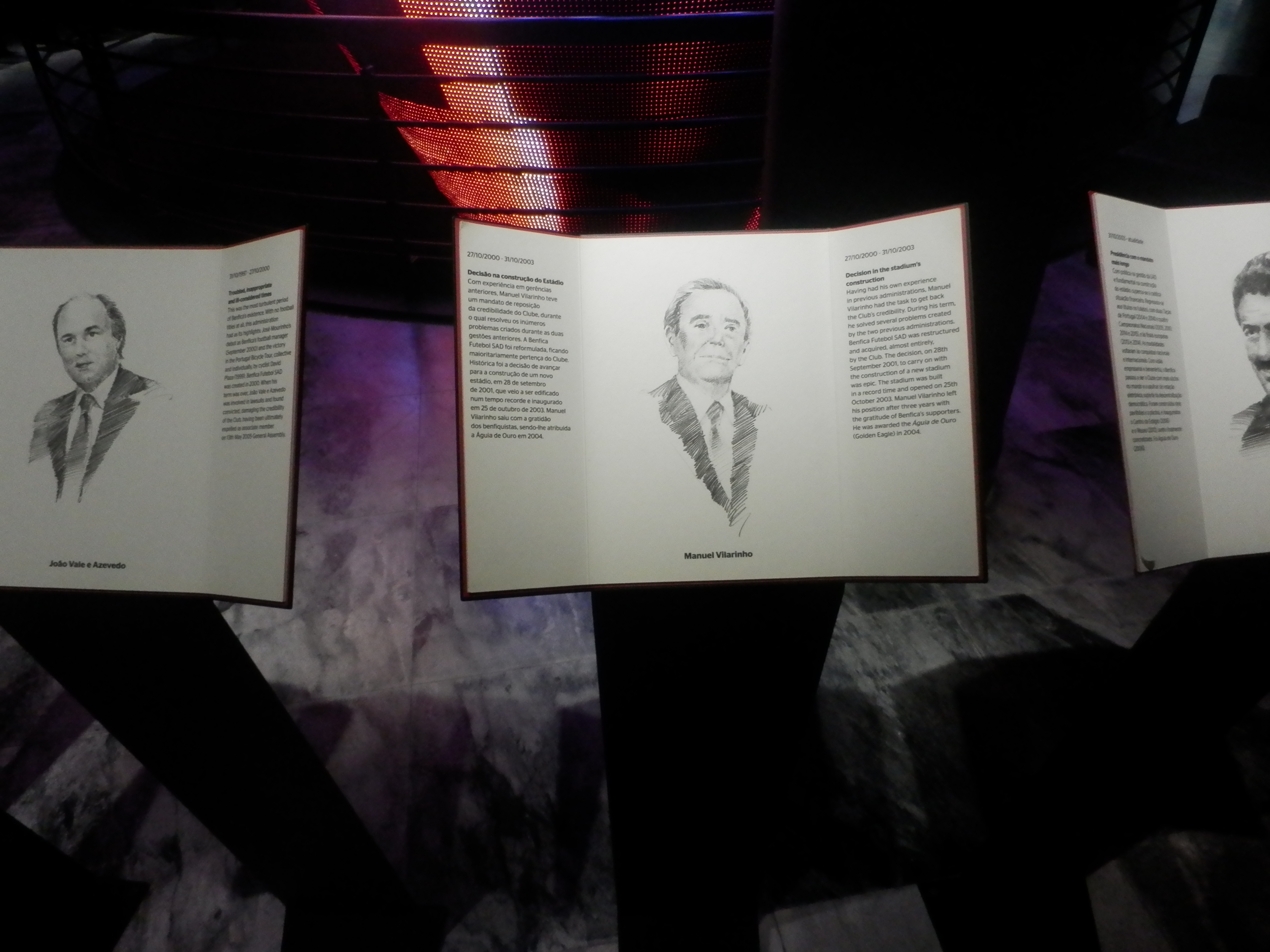
A drawing of Vilarinho (center) alongside a description of his Benfica presidency at Museu Benfica

Born in Lisbon, Vilarinho was elected president of Benfica on 27 October 2000 with 62% of the votes, ousting the incumbent chairman João Vale e Azevedo in the second most contested election in the history of Benfica. In the club's football department, Vilarinho caused head coach José Mourinho to demand a contract extension and ultimately leave Benfica when he stated that he saw the team's former player and coach Toni as their manager for the future. Vilarinho later admitted that he would have probably renewed Mourinho's contract, but his refusal to negotiate an extension mid-season led to the manager's departure.

Vilarinho green-lighted the construction of the new Estádio da Luz, with the team moving to the stadium in 2004. Additionally, he gave his full support to the presidential candidacy of Luís Filipe Vieira, the club's director of football at the time, who became president of Benfica on 31 October 2003. Three years later, Vilarinho was elected as the fifth president of the club's General Assembly on 27 October.

== Honours ==
=== Futsal (3 titles) ===
- 1 Portuguese League
- 1 Portuguese Cup
- 1 Portuguese SuperCup

=== Roller hockey (4 titles) ===
- 2 Portuguese Cup
- 2 Portuguese SuperCup

=== Rugby (1 title) ===
- 1 Campeonato Nacional Honra/Super Bock

== Personal life ==
Vilarinho is married to Mariana Correia da Costa Pereira Caldas, daughter of João Jorge Dargent Pereira Caldas (of maternal French Belgian descent) and Ana Maria Bicker Correia da Costa (of remote Dutch descent).

Preceded by João Vale e Azevedo	President of Benfica; 2000–2003	Succeeded by Luís Filipe Vieira
