= Luís Filipe Vieira =

Portuguese real estate businessman (born 1949)

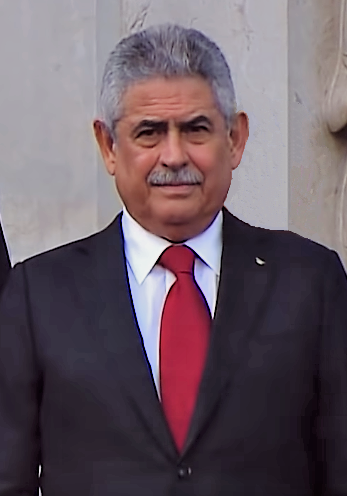
- Vieira in 2019

33rd President of Benfica
- In office 31 October 2003 – 15 July 2021
- Preceded by: Manuel Vilarinho
- Succeeded by: Rui Costa

Personal details
- Born: 22 June 1949 (age 77) Bairro das Furnas, São Domingos de Benfica, Lisbon, Portugal
- Spouse: Vanda Vieira (m. 1974)
- Children: Tiago Vieira; Sara Vieira
- Parent(s): Benvinda Ferreira; Fernando Mendes Vieira
- Occupation: Real estate businessman
- Known for: Presidency of Benfica

Luís Filipe Ferreira Vieira (born 22 June 1949) is a Portuguese real estate businessman who was the 33rd president of sports club Benfica, from 31 October 2003 to 15 July 2021.

He was also president of the club's SAD board of directors until July 2021, when he was arrested in operation "Red Card" (Portuguese: Cartão Vermelho).

== Early life and career ==
Vieira was born on 22 June 1949 in Bairro das Furnas, São Domingos de Benfica, to Benvinda Ferreira (mother), a factory worker, and Fernando Mendes Vieira, a construction worker.

Vieira started his professional career in the tire industry, where he got the nickname "Kadhafi dos pneus" (Kadhafi of tires). Afterwards, he asserted himself in the construction industry; along with two partners, he funded Obriverca in 1985, which was considered one of Portugal's biggest construction companies. In 2008, seven years after leaving the company, Vieira was ranked by Portuguese magazine Exame as the 74th wealthiest person in Portugal, with a fortune of €162 million, mostly due to his real estate business called Grupo Inland. This company belongs to business group Promovalor, managed by his son, Tiago, and of which Vieira is chairman of the board of directors.

On 31 January 2018, the Portuguese Attorney General's Office confirmed Vieira as a formal suspect (arguido) in Operação Lex (Operation Lex) for influence peddling. In 2018, Vieira had allegedly promised then judge (and neighbour) Rui Rangel a position at Benfica in return for an alleged influence on a pending lawsuit related to a company belonging to Vieira's family.

By May 2021, Vieira was considered the second-biggest debtor of Novo Banco, with a debt of €440 million related to Promovalor.

== Presidency of Alverca ==
In May 1991, Vieira became president of football club Alverca, a position he held for ten years. In May 2001, he suspended his presidency and left the club to join Benfica as an adviser for its SAD, at a time when he was a paying member (sócio) of Benfica rivals Sporting CP and Porto, and had made several deals with the latter club as president of Alverca.

== Presidency of Benfica ==
=== 2003–2006 ===
On 31 October 2003, Vieira was elected 33rd president of Benfica, with 90,47% of the votes of its members, thus succeeding Manuel Vilarinho, who had beaten João Vale e Azevedo in 2000. With the support of Vilarinho, Vieira defeated candidates Jaime Antunes and Guerra Madaleno in the club's first use of electronic voting. Months later, Benfica won their first trophy in eight years, the Portuguese Cup, with manager José Antonio Camacho.

On 2 June 2005, Vieira threatened to resign if Benfica did not achieve 300,000 members until October that year. With Giovanni Trapattoni as manager in the 2004–05 season, Benfica won the Portuguese League, ending an eleven-year drought. In the 2005–06 season, with manager Ronald Koeman, Benfica won the Portuguese Super Cup and reached the quarter-finals of the UEFA Champions League, knocking out defending champions Liverpool.

=== 2006–2009 ===
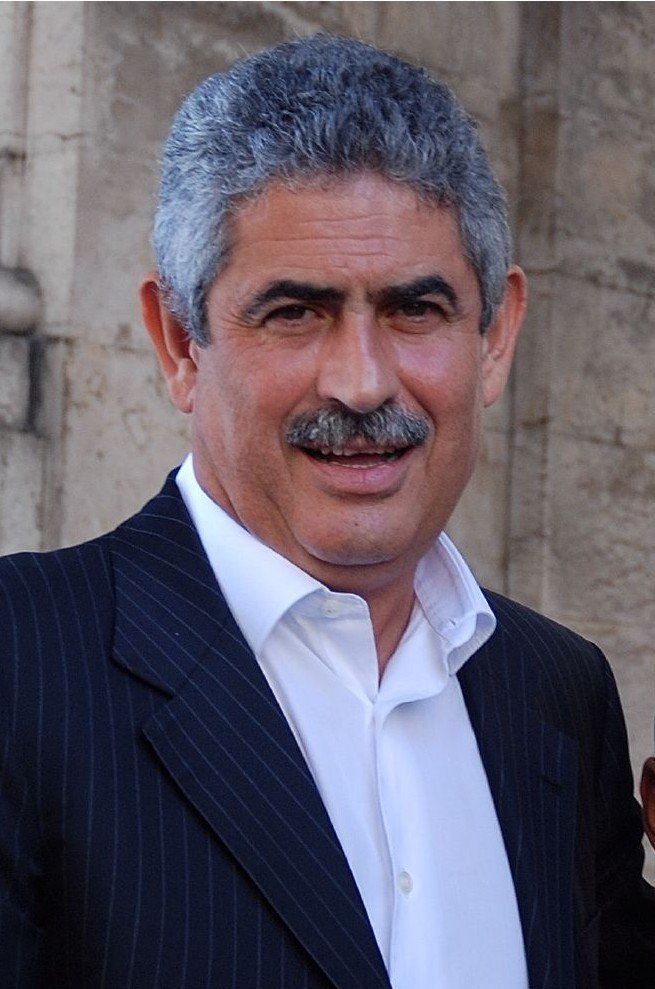
Vieira in 2007

On 27 October 2006, Vieira ran uncontested and was reelected for a second term, receiving 95.6% of the votes. Back in September 2006, Vieira had stated, "Benfica's debt does not scare anyone, let Benfica get to 2011 and you will see that Benfica will be a European colossus, not to say worldwide". In addition, he had reminded his ambition of making Benfica European champions again. In November, with 160,398 paying members, Benfica was recognized by the Guinness World Records as "the most widely supported football club".

For the 2006–07 season, Vieira signed manager Fernando Santos, whose contract would not last long. Following a trophyless season, Santos was sacked after his first league match of the season, eventually being replaced by Camacho, who returned to the club. From then to the 2008–09 season, Benfica finished fourth and third in the league, respectively, and won the second edition of the League Cup with manager Quique Sánchez Flores. At financial level, Benfica SAD started to be listed on the Portuguese stock exchange Euronext Lisbon in May 2007.

=== 2009–2012 ===
On 3 July 2009, after dismissing the club's governing bodies on 8 June to call early elections, Vieira was reelected with 91.74% of the votes, defeating Bruno Costa Carvalho, who got 2.98%, in a total of 20,672 voters. Before winning the elections, Vieira promised a more winning term in football; in his previous one, Benfica did not achieve better than a third-place finish in the league and one League Cup trophy. In the first year of his third term, with Jorge Jesus as manager, Benfica won the Portuguese League and their second League Cup. In the two following seasons, the team would retain the League Cup, reach the quarter-finals of the 2011–12 UEFA Champions League, and finish second in the league, twice.

Vieira, after being contested by members of Benfica following the team's elimination against Braga in the semi-finals of the 2010–11 UEFA Europa League, stated, "I am not held on to the presidency of Benfica." Back in late April 2010, slightly more than 100 members of Benfica had approved the new statutes of the club with 95% of the votes, in which the most notable changes were the requirement of 25 years of continuous membership as an adult for presidential candidates (they must be at least 43 years old), the extension of the presidential term from three to four years, and the extension from 20 to 50 votes for effective members with more than 25 years of membership.

=== 2012–2016 ===
On 28 September 2012, Vieira became the second president of Benfica to have the club's annual accounts voted down by its members, after Manuel Damásio in 1997. Benfica presented an €11 million loss, despite heavy earnings in the previous UEFA Champions League campaign and through the sales of players such as Fábio Coentrão and Roberto. Vieira was asked to resign by members of Benfica. On 13 October, he ran for a fourth term, announcing the goal of winning three Portuguese League titles, of reaching one European final in football, and of winning a total of 50 championship titles in other sports. He also promised to broadcast Benfica's home league matches on Benfica TV, thus not renewing the club's contract with Joaquim Oliveira's Olivedesportos. Prior to club elections, a group of Benfica members, including the candidate list led by Rui Rangel, questioned Vieira's membership years with the club.

On 26 October, Vieira was reelected with 83.02% of votes, defeating Rui Rangel, who got 13.83%. One day before, Vieira had said that lowering Benfica's debt was not a priority. Later, on 7 December, he surpassed Bento Mântua as the longest-serving president at Benfica. In the first year of his fourth term, Benfica finished second in the league and were runners-up in both the Portuguese Cup and UEFA Europa League; manager Jesus was contested but remained at the club for two more seasons. In the 2013–14 season, Benfica achieved an unprecedented treble of Portuguese League, Portuguese Cup and League Cup, and were again runners-up in the UEFA Europa League. Benfica's overall performance in the 2014–15 season was considered positive, as Vieira was just one football league title away from his 2012 silverware promise, dubbed "3+1+50". Financially, in early October 2016, after the 2015–16 season, Benfica reported total assets of €416 million, an increase of 14.2%, and total liabilities of €495 million, an increase of 6.1%.

=== 2016–2020 ===
On 27 October 2016, without opponents for a second time, Vieira was reelected for a fifth term, receiving 95.52% of votes – 12,503 voters in a total of 13,257. In March 2017, prior to Benfica's clinching of the league title, Vieira stated "We [Benfica] are 10 years ahead of the competition [other Portuguese clubs]", promising to lower Benfica's debt by €200 million in two years. Then, on July, following Benfica's first four league titles in a row (tetra), he said, "Until we do not have control over the debt, we will not stop selling" and later underscored that "one can mortgage a title, but not the club's future".

Later, in September, in a heated general assembly of the club, following the 5–0 away defeat to Basel in the Champions League, Vieira was contested (and insulted) by some members of Benfica. He told all those present to believe in the Portuguese title (now lost) and replied to a resignation request: "I will be here [at Benfica] for many and many years to come." In early November, despite the continuation of Benfica's bad season start, Vieira reinforced his confidence in manager Vitória by saying, "There is no [negative] result that will take Rui Vitória away from this project." Later in February 2018, he stated, "When I leave Benfica, surely I will be poorer, not richer."

The club's overall performance in 2017–18 was deemed negative, as Benfica did not win any league title in men's basketball, football, futsal, handball, roller hockey and volleyball. Therefore, prior to the 2018–19 season, Vieira stated: "This will be the season of reconquest! And of quick return to our victorious cycle and of hegemony in Portuguese football." In late November 2018, Vieira was about to sack Rui Vitória after a string of bad results, but he changed his mind overnight due to "a feeling, a light", thus keeping the coach. Nonetheless, two days after the club's first-ever loss to Portimonense on 2 January 2019, Vieira terminated Vitória's contract. Coach Bruno Lage was signed the next day and guided Benfica to their 37th champions title. The next season, Benfica only won the Portuguese Super Cup.

During a general assembly on 27 September 2019, Vieira insulted and grabbed a Benfica member by the neck after the latter criticised the club's board of directors, especially Vieira, who refused to apologise for the incident. In May 2020, the Portuguese Securities Market Commission denied Benfica SGPS' takeover attempt of Benfica SAD because the funding source was the SAD itself. If successful, the takeover would benefit the largest single shareholder of Benfica SAD, José António dos Santos ("King of Chickens"), friend and business partner of Vieira.

=== 2020–2021 ===
For the 2020–21 season, Vieira signed Jorge Jesus for a second time, as part of the club's €105 million investment amid the COVID-19 pandemic, the biggest ever in Portuguese football. Despite this, Benfica were eliminated in the Champions League third qualifying round, lost the Super Cup match, finished third in the league, and lost a Portuguese Cup final for a second time in a row. Considered a failed, disastrous season, it was the first time Benfica ended trophyless since 2012–13.

==== Elections ====
On 28 October 2020, shortly after the beginning of the 2020–21 season, Vieira was reelected for a sixth term with 62.59% of votes, the lowest percentage he ever obtained, in the most participated electoral meeting in the history of the club, with 38,102 total voters. For the first time, associates were able to vote at Benfica Houses in mainland Portugal, due to the pandemic, in a total of 25 voting locations.

The elections were marked by controversy, as the general assembly president at the time, Virgílio Duque Vieira, refused to count (physical) votes after promising Luís Filipe Vieira's opposition to do so, with ballot boxes, some of them poorly sealed, being taken away in ordinary and apparently insecure vehicles by a company in charge of Benfica football team's security.

Since then, the 2020 elections have been criticized by presidential candidates João Noronha Lopes (34.71% of votes) and Rui Gomes da Silva (1.64%), as well as by Francisco Benitez of Movimento Servir o Benfica, for lack of transparency, also in regard to the absence of electoral rolls and to the uncertified electronic voting system developed and implemented by the club. Moreover, prior to the elections, Vieira refused to confront presidential candidates, describing debates as "noise" and saying that the club's future would not be decided in elections.

==== Lawsuit, arrest and resignation ====
On 10 June 2021, Vieira was the target of a civil lawsuit by lawyer and Benfica member Jorge Mattamouros with the goal of removing him from presidency for violation of the club's statutes. Vieira was accused of using Benfica for personal gain. Mattamouros promised to remove the lawsuit if Vieira resigned.

On 7 July, Vieira and José António dos Santos were arrested on suspicions of breach of trust against Benfica, aggravated fraud, tax evasion, forgery, and money laundering. Among the accusations, Vieira and Santos are indicted for making a promissory contract, without notifying the Portuguese Securities Market Commission, to sell 25% of Benfica SAD to American businessman John Textor for €50 million, with the latter making a €1 million advance payment. In addition, Vieira and businessman Bruno Macedo are accused of embezzling €2.5 million from transfers of footballers Derlis González, Cláudio Correa, and César Martins.

Two days after the arrest, Vieira suspended his functions as president, despite the club statutes not allowing it, and was temporarily replaced by vice-president Rui Costa. On 10 July, Vieira was put under house arrest on bail of €3 million, to be paid within 20 days, and was ordered to hand over his passport. He released a statement two days later requesting supporters to "remain calm in defending the good reputation of the wonderful institution that is Benfica", and his lawyer said Vieira was considering a return as club president. Vieira resigned from presidency of Benfica and its SAD on 15 July, and Mattamouros withdrew his lawsuit.

During Vieira's 18-year presidency of Benfica, the men's football team won 7 league titles, 3 Portuguese Cups, 7 League Cups, and 5 Portuguese Super Cups.

== Benfica presidency aftermath ==
In October, Vieira appeared at the 2021 Benfica elections and said that "too much democracy at Benfica harms the club". In January 2022, it was widely reported that Vieira is suspected of receiving money from 55 football transfers.

== Personal life ==
Vieira married Vanda on 23 August 1974, and they have two children, Tiago (son) and Sara (daughter). Vieira resides in Dafundo, Oeiras.

In 1993, Vieira was sentenced to 20 months in prison for stealing a truck in 1984 to collect a debt. However, he did not serve the sentence because of two amnesty laws, which granted him full pardon.

In July 2021, Tiago, along with his father, was arrested in operation "Red Card" (Portuguese: Cartão Vermelho). In September that year, at the request of Novo Banco, the Civil Court of Lisbon ordered the seizing of Vieira's Benfica shares and a house. He was hoping to sell his 3.28% of shares for €5.9 million. In October 2022, Vieira was sentenced to pay 7.5 million euros to Novo Banco by the same court. He has appealed the decision.

| Preceded by Manuel Vilarinho | President of Benfica; 2003–2021 | Succeeded by Rui Costa |
