= Nine-a-side volleyball at the 1962 Asian Games – Women's tournament =

Women at the 1962 Asian Games
- Venue: Senayan Volleyball Stadium
- Date: 29–31 August 1962
- Nations: 4

Medalists
gold medal	Japan
silver medal	South Korea
bronze medal	Indonesia

This page presents the results of the Women's 9-man Volleyball Tournament at the 1962 Asian Games, which was held from 29 to 31 August 1962 in Jakarta, Indonesia.

== Results ==
Pos	Team	Pld	W	L	Pts	SW	SL	SR	SPW	SPL	SPR
1	Japan	3	3	0	6	9	0	MAX	191	107	1.785
2	South Korea	3	2	1	5	6	4	1.500	192	170	1.129
3	Indonesia	3	1	2	4	4	8	0.500	171	231	0.740
4	Philippines	3	0	3	3	2	9	0.222	179	225	0.796

Source: Results

Date		Score		Set 1	Set 2	Set 3	Set 4	Set 5	Total
29 Aug	South Korea	3–0	Philippines	21–19	22–20	21–12			64–51
29 Aug	Indonesia	0–3	Japan	4–21	2–21	13–21			19–63
30 Aug	Japan	3–0	South Korea	21–18	23–21	21–11			65–50
30 Aug	Indonesia	3–2	Philippines	21–17	21–14	19–21	16–21	21–17	98–90
31 Aug	Japan	3–0	Philippines	21–15	21–17	21–6			63–38
31 Aug	Indonesia	1–3	South Korea	21–15	11–21	11–21	11–21		54–78

== Final standing ==
Rank	Team	Pld	W	L
1st place, gold medalist(s)	Japan	3	3	0
2nd place, silver medalist(s)	South Korea	3	2	1
3rd place, bronze medalist(s)	Indonesia	3	1	2
4	Philippines	3	0	3
