= Thelma Barina-Rojas =

Filipino volleyball player

Thelma Barina
Personal information
- Nationality: Filipino
- Born: 1961 or 1962 (age 64–65)
- Home town: Cebu, Philippines
- Education: Southwestern University; University of Southern Philippines

Coaching information
- Current team: Makati Gospel School

Volleyball information
- Position: Open Spiker

National team
- Years: Team
- 1981-1993: Philippines
Honours
Representing Philippines
Women's Volleyball
Southeast Asian Games
Gold medal – first place	1981 Manila	Team
Gold medal – first place	1985 Bangkok	Team
Gold medal – first place	1987 Jakarta	Team
Gold medal – first place	1993 Singapore	Team
Silver medal – second place	1983 Singapore	Team
Bronze medal – third place	1991 Manila	Team

Thelma Barina-Rojas (born 1961 or 1962) is a Filipino volleyball player. She played for the Philippines women's national volleyball team at the Southeast Asian Games from 1981 to 1993, helping the team medal in all six editions she participated in.

== Early life ==
Born in the 1960s, Thelma Barina was born to young parents (ages 16 and 20) and is the eldest sister to four younger brothers. Her father is a military man. She and her family grew up poor.

Barina-Rojas took up the sport of volleyball when she was pursuing a college course on accounting at the Southwestern University in Cebu City.

== Career ==
=== College ===
She would be part of Southwestern University and the University of Southern Philippines volleyball teams which played in the Cebu Amateur Athletics Association.

=== National team ===
Barina was invited to try-out for the Philippines women's national volleyball team as a student at Southwestern. With her family facing financial issues, she secured an airfare ticket from her grandfather for the tryout.

She was able to secure a berth in the national team which went on to win the gold medal at the 1981 Southeast Asian Games in Manila. She was also part of the squad which won the women's volleyball title in the 1985, 1987 edition of the regional games.

She skipped the 1989 edition due to undergoing childbirth. She returned for the 1991 edition but the team only placed third. Her last SEA Games was in 1993, when the Philippines clinched the gold once again.

She was named Most Valuable Player and Best Open Spiker in the 1987 edition, and the Best Service Receiver in the 1991 edition.

== Post-retirement ==
By 2017, Barina-Rojas is working at the Makati Gospel School where she serves as a PE teacher and the head coach of the school's volleyball team.

== Personal life ==
Barina is married to volleyball referee Rodrigo "Buboy" Rojas with whom she has three children.
