= Zenaida Ybañez-Chavez =

Filipino volleyball player

Personal information
- Nickname: Nene
- Nationality: Filipino
- Born: 1970 or 1971 (age 55–56)
- Home town: Cebu, Philippines
- Education: Southwestern University
- Height: 1.85 m (6 ft 1 in)

Coaching information
- Current team: Standard Insurance-Navy Corvettes

Volleyball information

Career
- Years: Team
- 2013: Philippine Navy

National team
- Years: Team
- 1990–1993: Philippines
Honours
Representing Philippines
Women's volleyball
Southeast Asian Games
Bronze medal – third place	1991 Manila	Team
Gold medal – first place	1993 Singapore	Team

Zenaida Ybañez-Chavez (born 1970 or 1971) is a retired volleyball player who played for the Philippine national team and former coach at the Philippine Super Liga.

== Career ==
=== Early career ===
Ybañez-Chavez played for the girls' volleyball team of her school, the Southwestern University (SWU). As champions of Visayas, SWU faced the champions of Manila, UAAP champions University of Santo Tomas at the 1987 National UAAP in Davao. Ybañez-Chavez was part of the said squad. It was in this tournament that she was first scouted to play for the Philippine national team. However, Ybañez-Chavez declined the offer at that time since it was her first year in playing competitive volleyball. Every year until 1990, the lass was urged to try out for the national team but Ybañez-Chavez insists on focusing on her studies.

=== Philippine national team ===
After a few years of urging, Ybañez-Chavez along with Rosemarie Prochina, and for other players from Cebu went to Manila in 1990 to try out for the national team that will participate at the 1991 Southeast Asian Games. Only Ybañez-Chavez and Prochina managed to gain a slot at the national team due to competition from Manila-based players. The national squad settled for bronze at the 1990 Southeast Asian Games. The national squad underwent training in Japan and joined various tournaments such as in Thailand as preparations for the 1993 Southeast Asian Games. The Philippine squad under Staņislavs Lugailo clinched the gold medal at the games beating Thailand in the finals. Ybañez-Chavez was named as the MVP and Best Spiker of the women's volleyball event.

Ybañez-Chavez was part of the squad that was supposed to participate at the 1994 Asian Games but the Philippine Olympic Committee did not permit the national squad to participate. Ybañez-Chavez was also then named as part of the squad that will participate at the 1995 Southeast Asian Games but she was pulled out from the squad due to her getting pregnant. She was not also able to play for the national team at the 1997 and 2003 Southeast Asian Games due to two other pregnancies.

=== Later playing years and coaching career ===
The former national team member, remain to play competitive volleyball until 2013, last playing for Philippine Navy. As of August 2016, Ybañez-Chavez is serving as head coach of the Standard Insurance-Navy Corvettes of the Philippine Super Liga

== Personal life ==
Zenaida Ybanez-Chavez is married to former boxer, Ronald Chavez with whom she has at least four children.
