= João Santos (chairman) =

Portuguese businessman (1914–2005)

- Born: João Maria dos Santos Júnior; 3 December 1914; Lisbon, Portugal
- Died: 15 February 2005 (aged 90); Lisbon, Portugal
- Occupation: Businessman
- Known for: Presidency of S.L. Benfica

João Maria dos Santos Júnior (3 December 1914 – 15 February 2005), commonly known as João Santos, was a Portuguese businessman who served as the 28th president of sports club S.L. Benfica, succeeding Fernando Martins.

Born on 3 December 1914 in Lisbon, Santos was elected president of Benfica on 27 March 1987. During his five-year presidency, from 3 April 1987 to 24 April 1992 (two consecutive tenures), the club's football team won three Primeira Liga titles (1986–87, 1988–89, 1990–91), one Taça de Portugal (1986–87), one Supertaça Cândido de Oliveira (1989), and reached two European Cup finals (1988, 1990). He was succeeded by Jorge de Brito.

Santos died on 15 February 2005 in Lisbon at age 90. He was cremated at Alto de São João Cemetery.

Preceded by Fernando Martins	President of Benfica; 1987–1992	Succeeded by Jorge de Brito
