= 1998 FIVB Women's Volleyball World Championship qualification =

The 1998 FIVB Women's Volleyball World Championship qualification was a qualification event, played in 1997 and 1998, for the thirteenth edition of FIVB Women's World Championship, which was held in Japan from November 3 to November 12, 1998. The event was split into several groups divided by continent.

== Qualified teams ==
Team	Confederation	Qualified as	Qualified on	Appearance in finals
Japan	AVC	Host		11th
China	AVC	AVC Pool B Winner	29 June 1997	9th
South Korea	AVC	AVC Pool C Winner	6 July 1997	8th
Russia	CEV	CEV Pool D Winner	14 September 1997	12th^{1}
Bulgaria	CEV	CEV Pool H Winner	14 September 1997	9th
Thailand	AVC	AVC Playoff Winner	18 September 1997	1st
Netherlands	CEV	CEV Pool E Winner	21 September 1997	9th
Brazil	CSV	CSV Pool K Winner	2 November 1997	11th
Peru	CSV	CSV Pool K Runner-up	2 November 1997	10th
Cuba	NORCECA	NORCECA Pool I Winner	9 November 1997	8th
Germany	CEV	CEV Pool G Winner	4 January 1998	10th^{2}
Croatia	CEV	CEV Pool F Winner	11 January 1998	1st
Italy	CEV	CEV Playoff Winner	1 February 1998	6th
United States	NORCECA	NORCECA Pool J Winner	1 February 1998	11th
Kenya	CAVB	CAVB Pool A Winner	1 March 1998	2nd
Dominican Republic	NORCECA	NORCECA Playoff Winner	14 March 1998	3rd

1. Competed as Soviet Union from 1952 to 1990; 2nd appearance as Russia.
2. Competed as West Germany from 1956 to 1990; 2nd appearance as Germany.

== Confederation qualification processes ==
The distribution by confederation for the 1998 FIVB Women's Volleyball World Championship was:

- Asia and Oceania (AVC): 3.5 places (+ Japan qualified automatically as host nation for a total of 4.5 places)
- Africa (CAVB): 1 place
- Europe (CEV): 5.5 places
- South America (CSV) 2 places
- North, Central America and Caribbean (NORCECA): 3 places

== Africa ==
6 national teams entered qualification. (Malawi later withdrew) The teams were distributed according to their position in the FIVB Senior Women's Rankings. Teams ranked 1–2 automatically qualified for the second round.

Sub Pool a	Pool A
Nigeria; Algeria; ~~Malawi~~; Tunisia	Egypt; Kenya; 1st Sub Pool a 2nd Sub Pool a

=== Sub Pool a ===
- Venue: Tunis, Tunisia
- Dates: April 10–12, 1997

Pos	Team	Pld	W	L	Pts	SW	SL	SR	SPW	SPL	SPR
1	Algeria	2	2	0	4	6	3	2.000	0	0	—
2	Nigeria	2	1	1	3	5	4	1.250	0	0	—
3	Tunisia	2	0	2	2	2	6	0.333	0	0	—

Date		Score		Set 1	Set 2	Set 3	Set 4	Set 5	Total
10 Apr	Tunisia	1–3	Algeria						
11 Apr	Nigeria	2–3	Algeria						
12 Apr	Tunisia	1–3	Nigeria						

=== Pool A ===
- Venue: Nairobi, Kenya
- Dates: February 27 – March 1, 1998

Pos	Team	Pld	W	L	Pts	SW	SL	SR	SPW	SPL	SPR
1	Kenya	3	3	0	6	9	1	9.000	150	94	1.596
2	Egypt	3	2	1	5	7	7	1.000	164	187	0.877
3	Algeria	3	1	2	4	5	8	0.625	155	169	0.917
4	Nigeria	3	0	3	3	4	9	0.444	149	168	0.887

Date		Score		Set 1	Set 2	Set 3	Set 4	Set 5	Total
27 Feb	Nigeria	2–3	Egypt	12–15	15–5	8–15	16–14	10–15	61–64
27 Feb	Algeria	0–3	Kenya	4–15	14–16	11–15			29–46
28 Feb	Nigeria	2–3	Algeria	12–15	15–6	15–8	11–15	12–15	65–59
28 Feb	Egypt	1–3	Kenya	6–15	8–15	16–14	12–15		42–59
01 Mar	Algeria	2–3	Egypt	8–15	15–7	16–17	15–4	13–15	67–58
01 Mar	Kenya	3–0	Nigeria	15–11	15–1	15–11			45–23

== Asia and Oceania ==
9 national teams entered qualification. The teams were distributed according to their position in the FIVB Senior Women's Rankings. Teams ranked 1–7 automatically qualified for the second round.

Sub Pool b	Pool B	Pool C
Kazakhstan; Uzbekistan	China; Thailand; Australia; Indonesia	South Korea; Chinese Taipei; Philippines; 1st Sub Pool b

=== Sub Pool b ===
- Venue: Home and Away
- Dates: June 8–15, 1997

Pos	Team	Pld	W	L	Pts	SW	SL	SR	SPW	SPL	SPR
1	Kazakhstan	2	2	0	4	6	0	MAX	0	0	—
2	Uzbekistan	2	0	2	2	0	6	0.000	0	0	—

Date		Score		Set 1	Set 2	Set 3	Set 4	Set 5	Total
08 Jun	Kazakhstan	3–0	Uzbekistan						
15 Jun	Uzbekistan	0–3	Kazakhstan						

=== Pool B ===
- Venue: Chengdu, China
- Dates: June 27–29, 1997

Pos	Team	Pld	W	L	Pts	SW	SL	SR	SPW	SPL	SPR
1	China	3	3	0	6	9	0	MAX	135	27	5.000
2	Thailand	3	2	1	5	6	3	2.000	109	59	1.847
3	Indonesia	3	1	2	4	3	6	0.500	57	113	0.504
4	Australia	3	0	3	3	0	9	0.000	33	135	0.244

Date		Score		Set 1	Set 2	Set 3	Set 4	Set 5	Total
27 Jun	Australia	0–3	Thailand	3–15	1–15	2–15			6–45
27 Jun	China	3–0	Indonesia	15–1	15–0	15–3			45–4
28 Jun	Indonesia	3–0	Australia	15–12	15–6	15–5			45–23
28 Jun	China	3–0	Thailand	15–12	15–2	15–5			45–19
29 Jun	Thailand	3–0	Indonesia	15–1	15–4	15–3			45–8
29 Jun	Australia	0–3	China	2–15	2–15	0–15			4–45

=== Pool C ===
- Venue: Suwon, South Korea
- Dates: July 4–6, 1997

Pos	Team	Pld	W	L	Pts	SW	SL	SR	SPW	SPL	SPR
1	South Korea	3	3	0	6	9	0	MAX	135	42	3.214
2	Chinese Taipei	3	2	1	5	6	3	2.000	105	77	1.364
3	Kazakhstan	3	1	2	4	3	6	0.500	75	111	0.676
4	Philippines	3	0	3	3	0	9	0.000	50	135	0.370

Date		Score		Set 1	Set 2	Set 3	Set 4	Set 5	Total
04 Jul	South Korea	3–0	Kazakhstan	15–3	15–2	15–6			45–11
04 Jul	Chinese Taipei	3–0	Philippines	15–5	15–6	15–2			45–13
05 Jul	South Korea	3–0	Chinese Taipei	15–12	15–2	15–1			45–15
05 Jul	Kazakhstan	3–0	Philippines	15–7	15–7	15–7			45–21
06 Jul	Philippines	0–3	South Korea	4–15	8–15	4–15			16–45
06 Jul	Chinese Taipei	3–0	Kazakhstan	15–9	15–3	15–7			45–19

=== Playoff ===
- Venue: Home and Away
- Dates: September 12–18, 1997

Pos	Team	Pld	W	L	Pts	SW	SL	SR	SPW	SPL	SPR
1	Thailand	2	2	0	4	6	0	MAX	90	40	2.250
2	Chinese Taipei	2	0	2	2	0	6	0.000	40	90	0.444

Date		Score		Set 1	Set 2	Set 3	Set 4	Set 5	Total
12 Sep	Chinese Taipei	0–3	Thailand	4–15	8–15	4–15			16–45
18 Sep	Thailand	3–0	Chinese Taipei	15–11	15–3	15–10			45–24

- Chinese Taipei advanced to the Asia-Europe playoff but later withdrew.

== Europe ==
23 national teams entered qualification. The teams were distributed according to their position in the FIVB Senior Women's Rankings. Teams ranked 1–17 automatically qualified for the second round.

Sub Pool c	Sub Pool d	Sub Pool e		
Austria; Hungary	Slovakia; Yugoslavia	Azerbaijan; Romania		
Pool D	Pool E	Pool F	Pool G	Pool H
Russia; Czech Republic; France; 1st Sub Pool e	Netherlands; Poland; Latvia; Spain	Croatia; Italy; Turkey; Portugal	Germany; Belarus; Greece; 1st Sub Pool d	Bulgaria; Ukraine; Belgium; 1st Sub Pool c

=== Sub Pool c ===
- Venue: Home and Away
- Dates: May 23 – June 14, 1997

Pos	Team	Pld	W	L	Pts	SW	SL	SR	SPW	SPL	SPR
1	Hungary	2	2	0	4	6	0	MAX	0	0	—
2	Austria	2	0	2	2	0	6	0.000	0	0	—

Date		Score		Set 1	Set 2	Set 3	Set 4	Set 5	Total
23 May	Austria	0–3	Hungary						
14 Jun	Hungary	3–0	Austria						

=== Sub Pool d ===
- Venue: Home and Away
- Dates: May 17 – June 7, 1997

Pos	Team	Pld	W	L	Pts	SW	SL	SR	SPW	SPL	SPR
1	Slovakia	2	2	0	4	6	1	6.000	101	69	1.464
2	Yugoslavia	2	0	2	2	1	6	0.167	69	101	0.683

Date		Score		Set 1	Set 2	Set 3	Set 4	Set 5	Total
17 May	Yugoslavia	1–3	Slovakia	12–15	15–11	13–15	11–15		51–56
07 Jun	Slovakia	3–0	Yugoslavia	15–5	15–9	15–4			45–18

=== Sub Pool e ===
- Venue: Home and Away
- Dates: May 3–25, 1997

Pos	Team	Pld	W	L	Pts	SW	SL	SR	SPW	SPL	SPR
1	Azerbaijan	2	2	0	4	6	1	6.000	0	0	—
2	Romania	2	0	2	2	1	6	0.167	0	0	—

Date		Score		Set 1	Set 2	Set 3	Set 4	Set 5	Total
03 May	Romania	1–3	Azerbaijan						
25 May	Azerbaijan	3–0	Romania						

=== Pool D ===
- Venue: Moscow, Russia
- Dates: September 12–14, 1997

Pos	Team	Pld	W	L	Pts	SW	SL	SR	SPW	SPL	SPR
1	Russia	3	3	0	6	9	0	MAX	135	38	3.553
2	Czech Republic	3	2	1	5	6	4	1.500	112	102	1.098
3	Azerbaijan	3	1	2	4	4	8	0.500	115	154	0.747
4	France	3	0	3	3	2	9	0.222	85	153	0.556

Date		Score		Set 1	Set 2	Set 3	Set 4	Set 5	Total
12 Sep	Czech Republic	3–1	Azerbaijan	15–4	11–15	15–6	15–9		56–34
12 Sep	Russia	3–0	France	15–2	15–4	15–3			45–9
13 Sep	France	2–3	Azerbaijan	15–4	5–15	16–14	9–15	8–15	53–63
13 Sep	Russia	3–0	Czech Republic	15–7	15–2	15–2			45–11
14 Sep	Czech Republic	3–0	France	15–3	15–7	15–13			45–23
14 Sep	Azerbaijan	0–3	Russia	7–15	3–15	8–15			18–45

=== Pool E ===
- Venue: Amsterdam, Netherlands
- Dates: September 19–21, 1997

Pos	Team	Pld	W	L	Pts	SW	SL	SR	SPW	SPL	SPR
1	Netherlands	3	3	0	6	9	2	4.500	135	38	3.553
2	Latvia	3	2	1	5	7	5	1.400	112	102	1.098
3	Poland	3	1	2	4	6	6	1.000	115	154	0.747
4	Spain	3	0	3	3	0	9	0.000	85	153	0.556

Date		Score		Set 1	Set 2	Set 3	Set 4	Set 5	Total
19 Sep	Spain	0–3	Netherlands	6–15	4–15	2–15			12–45
19 Sep	Poland	2–3	Latvia	12–15	15–11	15–3	4–15	12–15	58–59
20 Sep	Latvia	1–3	Netherlands	15–10	4–15	4–15	4–15		27–55
20 Sep	Poland	3–0	Spain	15–3	15–12	15–8			45–23
21 Sep	Spain	0–3	Latvia	4–15	12–15	11–15			27–45
14 Sep	Netherlands	3–1	Poland	5–15	15–6	16–14	15–4		51–39

=== Pool F ===
- Venue: Vicenza, Italy
- Dates: January 9–11, 1998

Pos	Team	Pld	W	L	Pts	SW	SL	SR	SPW	SPL	SPR
1	Croatia	3	3	0	6	9	0	MAX	135	60	2.250
2	Italy	3	2	1	5	6	4	1.500	120	88	1.364
3	Turkey	3	1	2	4	4	6	0.667	102	117	0.872
4	Portugal	3	0	3	3	0	9	0.000	43	135	0.319

Date		Score		Set 1	Set 2	Set 3	Set 4	Set 5	Total
09 Jan	Turkey	0–3	Croatia	8–15	11–15	4–15			23–45
09 Jan	Italy	3–0	Portugal	15–4	15–3	15–2			45–9
10 Jan	Croatia	3–0	Portugal	15–3	15–3	15–10			45–16
10 Jan	Italy	3–1	Turkey	9–15	15–2	15–8	15–9		54–34
11 Jan	Portugal	0–3	Turkey	6–15	10–15	2–15			18–45
11 Jan	Italy	0–3	Croatia	7–15	8–15	6–15			21–45

=== Pool G ===
- Venue: Bremen, Germany
- Dates: January 2–4, 1998

Pos	Team	Pld	W	L	Pts	SW	SL	SR	SPW	SPL	SPR
1	Germany	3	3	0	6	9	2	4.500	156	95	1.642
2	Greece	3	2	1	5	7	3	2.333	120	111	1.081
3	Belarus	3	1	2	4	4	7	0.571	121	141	0.858
4	Slovakia	3	0	3	3	1	9	0.111	87	137	0.635

Date		Score		Set 1	Set 2	Set 3	Set 4	Set 5	Total
02 Jan	Belarus	3–1	Slovakia	15–5	2–15	15–9	15–10		47–39
02 Jan	Greece	1–3	Germany	15–9	2–15	6–15	7–15		30–54
03 Jan	Slovakia	0–3	Germany	5–15	5–15	13–15			23–45
03 Jan	Belarus	0–3	Greece	13–15	13–15	6–15			32–45
04 Jan	Greece	3–0	Slovakia	15–7	15–12	15–6			45–25
04 Jan	Germany	3–1	Belarus	12–15	15–6	15–11	15–10		57–42

=== Pool H ===
- Venue: Sofia, Bulgaria
- Dates: September 12–14, 1997

Pos	Team	Pld	W	L	Pts	SW	SL	SR	SPW	SPL	SPR
1	Bulgaria	3	3	0	6	9	0	MAX	135	47	2.872
2	Ukraine	3	2	1	5	6	4	1.500	117	125	0.936
3	Hungary	3	1	2	4	4	6	0.667	121	121	1.000
4	Belgium	3	0	3	3	0	9	0.000	56	136	0.412

Date		Score		Set 1	Set 2	Set 3	Set 4	Set 5	Total
12 Sep	Ukraine	3–1	Hungary	17–15	15–13	7–15	15–11		54–54
12 Sep	Belgium	0–3	Bulgaria	4–15	3–15	1–15			8–45
13 Sep	Hungary	0–3	Bulgaria	8–15	8–15	5–15			21–45
13 Sep	Ukraine	3–0	Belgium	15–10	15–10	15–6			45–26
14 Sep	Belgium	0–3	Hungary	4–15	4–15	14–16			22–46
14 Sep	Bulgaria	3–0	Ukraine	15–8	15–8	15–2			45–18

=== Playoff ===
- Two runner-up teams having best rank in FIVB World Ranking advance to CEV playoff.
- Venue: Home and Away
- Dates: January 25 – February 1, 1998

Pos	Team	Pld	W	L	Pts	SW	SL	SR	SPW	SPL	SPR
1	Italy	2	2	0	4	6	1	6.000	102	54	1.889
2	Czech Republic	2	0	2	2	1	6	0.167	54	102	0.529

Date		Score		Set 1	Set 2	Set 3	Set 4	Set 5	Total
25 Jan	Italy	3–0	Czech Republic	15–3	15–13	15–3			45–19
01 Feb	Czech Republic	1–3	Italy	6–15	15–12	7–15	7–15		35–57

- Italy advanced to the Asia-Europe playoff but Chinese Taipei withdrew and Italy qualified directly to the World Championship.

== North, Central America and Caribbean ==
7 national teams entered qualification.

Pool I	Pool J
Cuba; Canada; Dominican Republic	United States; Mexico; Puerto Rico; Barbados

=== Pool I ===
- Venue: Santo Domingo, Dominican Republic
- Dates: November 7–9, 1997

Pos	Team	Pld	W	L	Pts	SW	SL	SR	SPW	SPL	SPR
1	Cuba	2	2	0	4	6	1	6.000	102	53	1.925
2	Dominican Republic	2	1	1	3	4	4	1.000	88	95	0.926
3	Canada	2	0	2	2	1	6	0.167	58	100	0.580

Date		Score		Set 1	Set 2	Set 3	Set 4	Set 5	Total
07 Nov	Cuba	3–1	Dominican Republic	12–15	15–8	15–2	15–8		57–33
08 Nov	Cuba	3–0	Canada	15–3	15–8	15–9			45–20
09 Nov	Dominican Republic	3–1	Canada	15–13	15–2	10–15	15–8		55–38

=== Pool J ===
- Venue: San Antonio, United States
- Dates: January 29 – February 1, 1998

==== Preliminary round ====
Pos	Team	Pld	W	L	Pts	SW	SL	SR	SPW	SPL	SPR
1	United States	3	3	0	6	9	0	MAX	135	33	4.091
2	Puerto Rico	3	2	1	5	6	3	2.000	108	82	1.317
3	Mexico	3	1	2	4	3	6	0.500	73	97	0.753
4	Barbados	3	0	3	3	0	9	0.000	31	135	0.230

Date		Score		Set 1	Set 2	Set 3	Set 4	Set 5	Total
29 Jan	Puerto Rico	3–0	Barbados	15–3	15–13	15–2			45–18
29 Jan	United States	3–0	Mexico	15–3	15–2	15–4			45–9
30 Jan	Barbados	0–3	Mexico	3–15	3–15	1–15			7–45
30 Jan	Puerto Rico	0–3	United States	6–15	8–15	4–15			18–45
31 Jan	Mexico	0–3	Puerto Rico	3–15	12–15	4–15			19–45
31 Jan	United States	3–0	Barbados	15–0	15–4	15–2			45–6

==== Final ====
Date		Score		Set 1	Set 2	Set 3	Set 4	Set 5	Total
01 Feb	United States	3–0	Puerto Rico	15–4	15–13	15–7			45–24

==== Final standing ====
Rank	Team
1	United States
2	Puerto Rico
3	Mexico
4	Barbados

=== Playoff ===
- Venue: Santo Domingo, Dominican Republic
- Dates: March 12–14, 1998

Pos	Team	Pld	W	L	Pts	SW	SL	SR	SPW	SPL	SPR
1	Dominican Republic	2	2	0	4	6	1	6.000	101	62	1.629
2	Puerto Rico	2	0	2	2	1	6	0.167	62	101	0.614

Date		Score		Set 1	Set 2	Set 3	Set 4	Set 5	Total
12 Mar	Puerto Rico	0–3	Dominican Republic	12–15	8–15	8–15			28–45
14 Mar	Dominican Republic	3–1	Puerto Rico	15–3	11–15	15–8	15–8		56–34

== South America ==
4 national teams entered qualification.

Pool K

Brazil
Peru
Argentina
Venezuela

=== Pool K ===
- Venue: Buenos Aires, Argentina and Arequipa, Peru
- Dates: October 23 – November 2, 1997

Pos	Team	Pld	W	L	Pts	SW	SL	SR	SPW	SPL	SPR
1	Brazil	6	6	0	12	18	0	MAX	271	88	3.080
2	Peru	6	4	2	10	12	8	1.500	235	212	1.108
3	Argentina	6	2	4	8	8	12	0.667	207	245	0.845
4	Venezuela	6	0	6	6	0	18	0.000	102	270	0.378

Date		Score		Set 1	Set 2	Set 3	Set 4	Set 5	Total
23 Oct	Brazil	3–0	Peru	15–7	15–9	15–3			45–19
23 Oct	Argentina	3–0	Venezuela	15–10	15–8	15–13			45–31
24 Oct	Brazil	3–0	Venezuela	15–1	15–2	15–2			45–5
24 Oct	Argentina	0–3	Peru	7–15	8–15	14–16			29–46
25 Oct	Peru	3–0	Venezuela	15–9	15–5	15–5			45–19
25 Oct	Argentina	0–3	Brazil	6–15	2–15	8–15			16–45
31 Oct	Argentina	0–3	Brazil	2–15	6–15	8–15			16–45
31 Oct	Venezuela	0–3	Peru	7–15	3–15	7–15			17–45
01 Nov	Brazil	3–0	Peru	15–2	15–4	16–14			46–20
01 Nov	Argentina	3–0	Venezuela	15–2	15–6	15–10			45–18
02 Nov	Venezuela	0–3	Brazil	4–15	5–15	3–15			12–45
02 Nov	Peru	3–2	Argentina	10–15	15–10	5–15	15–4	15–12	60–56
