= João Vale e Azevedo =

Portuguese lawyer and businessman (born 1957)

- Born: 17 May 1957 (age 69); Lisbon, Portugal
- Occupations: Former lawyer and former president of S.L. Benfica
- Spouse: Filipa Vale e Azevedo
- Status: On parole (after serving 3 years and 7 months)
- Criminal charges: Embezzlement, document forgery, breach of trust, money laundering
- Penalty: 11.5 years

João António de Araújo Vale e Azevedo (born 17 May 1957) is a Portuguese former lawyer who was the 31st president of sports club S.L. Benfica.

In relation to his three-year club presidency, he was convicted of embezzlement, document forgery, breach of trust, and money laundering.

== Presidency of Benfica ==
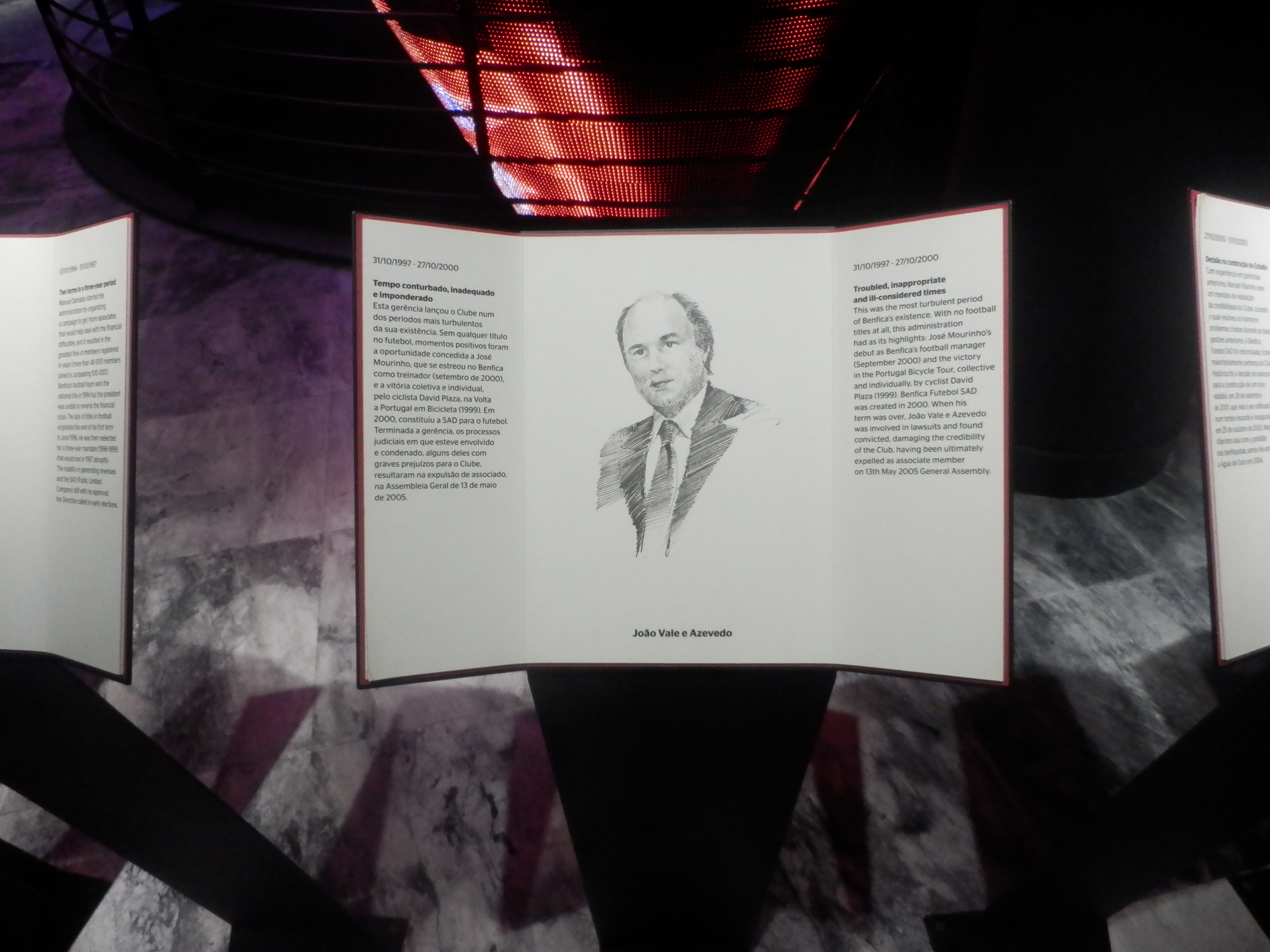
A drawing of Vale e Azevedo alongside a description of his presidency of Benfica on display at Museu Benfica

On 31 October 1997, Vale e Azevedo was elected the 31st president of Portuguese sports club S.L. Benfica, succeeding Manuel Damásio. Vale e Azevedo won the club elections with 51.5% of 19,824 votes, defeating Luís Tadeu and Abílio Rodrigues. Soon after, he signed Graeme Souness as coach of the football team. A year and a half later, Souness left the club and stated: "Vale e Azevedo lies when he looks in the eyes. Be careful, this man is dangerous".

On 6 November, Vale e Azevedo declared three contracts between Benfica and Olivedesportos (Controlinveste) void and announced that he would take the case to court. The contracts, which were related to static advertising and broadcasting rights of Benfica football matches, had been signed on 28 March 1996 by his predecessor, Damásio. Eight days later, Vale e Azevedo signed an agreement protocol with SIC for the broadcasting of the club's matches at the Estádio da Luz for the 1997–98 season. On 8 February 1999, Benfica signed a new contract with SIC for the broadcasting rights of all home matches in the Portuguese league from the 1999–2000 to the 2003–04 seasons. On 2 November 2000, the contracts with Olivedesportos were declared void in court.

During Vale e Azevedo's three-year presidency, which ended on 27 October 2000, Benfica accumulated huge debts and occasionally was not able to pay taxes or player salaries. Moreover, the football team did not win any silverware. Some of his highlights were the creation of Benfica SAD, the idealization of Benfica Futebol Campus, the signing of coach José Mourinho, the cycling team's Volta a Portugal victory in 1999, the informatisation of the club, and the start of the war against Olivedesportos. Vale e Azevedo was succeeded by Manuel Vilarinho following his defeat at the club's most attended elections at the time. In Benfica's General Assembly of 13 May 2005, Vale e Azevedo was expelled as member of the club.

== Imprisonment and release ==
On 16 February 2001, Vale e Azevedo was arrested at home in Almoçageme, Sintra. Months later, on 7 August, he was sent to jail. Prosecutors were concerned that he would leave the country or tamper with evidence. They investigated allegations that he had kept at least $1 million (£680,000) from the football transfer of Sergei Ovchinnikov to Alverca FC and that he had laundered cash through offshore banks in the British Virgin Islands. They investigated 14 counts of embezzlement. At the time, it was reported that Vale e Azevedo's yacht, "Lucky Me", was paid with part of that money.

On 17 April 2002, Vale e Azevedo was sentenced to four and a half years in prison in the Ovchinnikov case and was detained in Lisbon. On 8 July 2004, he was released on €250,000 bail in the Euroárea case. On 30 March 2007, he was sentenced to five years in prison in the Ribafria case. On 11 July, he was sentenced to seven and a half years in prison in the Dantas da Cunha case. On 5 May 2008, the National Republican Guard went to his house to detain him for his connection to the latter case, but he was in London, England. Two months later, on 8 July, he turned himself in at the police station in Belgravia, west London, following a European Arrest Warrant.

Vale e Azevedo was extradited to Portugal on 13 November 2012 and was sentenced to ten years in prison on 2 July 2013, for six crimes, and ordered to pay Benfica around €7 million for the money he kept from the transfers of footballers Scott Minto (£500,000), Gary Charles (£1,200,000), Tahar El Khalej ($850,000) and Amaral.

On 7 June 2016, Vale e Azevedo was released from prison on parole after serving 3 years and 7 months of his 11.5-year sentence. He fled to London in September 2018 on a private jet to escape the 10-year prison sentence ruled in 2013. On 22 January 2019, the Lisbon Appeal Court declared that Vale e Azevedo's alleged crimes of embezzlement of €1.2 million related to Benfica's television rights, between 1998 and 1999, had expired, 18 years after the alleged crimes. Benfica announced they would appeal the decision to the Supreme Court of Justice.

Since September 2022, he has declared contumacious for avoiding court since 2019 for scamming BCP into a €25 million loan and false assurances to court by document forgery, totaling 10 counts of scam and 4 counts of document forgery. After an appeal, the decision was upheld on 14 November 2023.

Preceded by Manuel Damásio	President of Benfica; 1997–2000	Succeeded by Manuel Vilarinho
