= List of S.L. Benfica presidents =

Sport Lisboa e Benfica, commonly known as Benfica, is a Portuguese sports club based in Lisbon. Ever since its foundation on 28 February 1904 as Sport Lisboa (later merged with Grupo Sport Benfica), it has had a total of 34 presidents. The first president was José Rosa Rodrigues and the current one is Rui Costa, who replaced the longest-serving Benfica president, Luís Filipe Vieira. The shortest tenure belongs to António Nunes de Almeida Guimarães.

To elect a president, the paying members of Benfica (sócios), along with Benfica houses, filiations, and delegations, vote in the club's elections, held every four years since 2012. In 2003 the club switched to electronic voting, and since 2010 only effective members with 25 years of continuous membership as an adult can run for president of Benfica. Therefore, they must be at least 43 years old to do so. (The new club statutes, approved in 2025, will change these requirements.)

The following chronological list comprises all those who have held the position of president of Benfica since its inception. Each president's entry includes dates and duration of his tenure, (Note: Most durations of tenure here displayed are not entirely precise, since presidents usually do not take office on elections day or the day election results are announced – and most dates here shown refer to election days.) as well as the club's men's football honours won under his management. Interim presidents are marked in italics.

== List of presidents ==
Overview of S.L. Benfica presidents
No.	Name	Nat.	From	To	Duration	Football trophies
1	José Rosa Rodrigues (1st president of Sport Lisboa)	(Portugal)	28 February 1904	22 November 1906	2 years, 267 days	
2	Luís Carlos de Faria Leal (1st president of Grupo Sport Benfica)	(Portugal)	18 November 1906	15 September 1907	301 days	
3	Januário Barreto (2nd president of Sport Lisboa)	(Portugal)	18 December 1906	13 September 1908	1 year, 270 days	
4	João José Pires (2nd president of Grupo Sport Benfica; 1st president after the club merger)	(Portugal)	15 September 1907	2 February 1910	2 years, 140 days	
5	Alfredo Alexandre Luís da Silva	(Portugal)	2 February 1910	26 March 1911	1 year, 52 days	1 Campeonato de Lisboa
6	António Nunes de Almeida Guimarães	(Portugal)	26 March 1911	9 July 1911	105 days	
7	Alberto Lima	(Portugal)	9 July 1911	31 March 1912	1 year, 85 days	1 Campeonato de Lisboa
8	José Eduardo Moreira Sales	(Portugal)	31 March 1912	5 December 1912	249 days	
—	Alberto Lima	(Portugal)	5 December 1912	29 August 1915	2 years, 267 days	2 Campeonato de Lisboa
9	José Antunes dos Santos Júnior	(Portugal)	29 August 1915	15 July 1916	321 days	1 Campeonato de Lisboa
10	Félix Bermudes	(Portugal)	15 July 1916	7 October 1916	1 year, 84 days	
11	Nuno Freire Themudo	(Portugal)	7 October 1916	22 July 1917	288 days	1 Campeonato de Lisboa
12	Bento Mântua	(Portugal)	22 July 1917	25 August 1926	9 years, 34 days	2 Campeonato de Lisboa
13	Alfredo Silveira Ávila de Melo	(Portugal)	25 August 1926	15 August 1930	3 years, 355 days	1 Campeonato de Portugal
14	Manuel da Conceição Afonso	(Portugal)	15 August 1930	20 August 1933	3 years, 5 days	1 Campeonato de Portugal; 1 Campeonato de Lisboa
15	Vasco Rosa Ribeiro	(Portugal)	20 August 1933	4 November 1936	3 years, 76 days	1 Primeira Divisão; 1 Campeonato de Portugal
—	Manuel da Conceição Afonso	(Portugal)	4 November 1936	31 July 1938	1 year, 269 days	2 Primeira Divisão
16	Júlio Ribeiro da Costa	(Portugal)	31 July 1938	1 August 1939	1 year, 1 day	
17	Augusto da Fonseca Júnior	(Portugal)	1 August 1939	18 January 1945	5 years, 170 days	2 Primeira Divisão; 3 Taça de Portugal; 1 Campeonato de Lisboa
—	Félix Bermudes	(Portugal)	18 January 1945	19 January 1946	1 year, 1 day	1 Primeira Divisão
—	Manuel da Conceição Afonso (Note: He asked to resign on 30 July.)	(Portugal)	19 January 1946	16 September 1946	240 days	
—	António Afonso da Costa e Sousa	(Portugal)	16 September 1946	25 January 1947	131 days	
18	João Tamagnini Barbosa (Note: He died during his tenure.)	(Portugal)	25 January 1947	15 December 1948	1 year, 325 days	
—	António Afonso da Costa e Sousa	(Portugal)	15 December 1948	29 January 1949	45 days	
19	Mário Lampreia de Gusmão Madeira	(Portugal)	29 January 1949	15 March 1952	3 years, 46 days	1 Primeira Divisão; 2 Taça de Portugal; 1 Latin Cup
20	Joaquim Ferreira Bogalho	(Portugal)	15 March 1952	30 March 1957	5 years, 15 days	1 Primeira Divisão; 3 Taça de Portugal
21	Maurício Vieira de Brito	(Portugal)	30 March 1957	31 March 1962	5 years, 1 day	3 Primeira Divisão; 2 Taça de Portugal; 1 European Cup
22	António Cabral Fezas Vital	(Portugal)	31 March 1962	26 March 1964	1 year, 361 days	1 Primeira Divisão; 1 Taça de Portugal; 1 European Cup
23	Adolfo Vieira de Brito	(Portugal)	26 March 1964	8 May 1965	1 year, 43 days	2 Primeira Divisão; 1 Taça de Portugal
24	António Catarino Duarte	(Portugal)	8 May 1965	17 June 1966	1 year, 40 days	
25	José Ferreira Queimado	(Portugal)	17 June 1966	3 July 1967	1 year, 16 days	1 Primeira Divisão
—	Adolfo Vieira de Brito	(Portugal)	3 July 1967	12 April 1969	1 year, 283 days	1 Primeira Divisão
26	Duarte Borges Coutinho	(Portugal)	12 April 1969	26 May 1977	8 years, 44 days	7 Primeira Divisão; 3 Taça de Portugal
—	José Ferreira Queimado	(Portugal)	26 May 1977	29 May 1981	4 years, 3 days	1 Primeira Divisão; 2 Taça de Portugal; 1 Supertaça de Portugal
27	Fernando Martins	(Portugal)	29 May 1981	27 March 1987	5 years, 302 days	2 Primeira Divisão; 3 Taça de Portugal; 1 Supertaça Cândido de Oliveira
28	João Santos	(Portugal)	27 March 1987	24 April 1992	5 years, 28 days	3 Primeira Divisão; 1 Taça de Portugal; 1 Supertaça Cândido de Oliveira
29	Jorge de Brito	(Portugal)	24 April 1992	7 January 1994	1 year, 258 days	1 Taça de Portugal
30	Manuel Damásio	(Portugal)	7 January 1994	31 October 1997	3 years, 297 days	1 Primeira Divisão; 1 Taça de Portugal
31	João Vale e Azevedo	(Portugal)	31 October 1997	27 October 2000	2 years, 362 days	
32	Manuel Vilarinho	(Portugal)	27 October 2000	31 October 2003	3 years, 4 days	
33	Luís Filipe Vieira (Note: He suspended his presidency on 9 July and resigned on 15 July.)	(Portugal)	31 October 2003	15 July 2021	17 years, 257 days	7 Primeira Liga; 3 Taça de Portugal; 7 Taça da Liga; 5 Supertaça Cândido de Oliveira
—	Rui Costa	(Portugal)	9 July 2021	10 October 2021	93 days	
34	Rui Costa	(Portugal)	10 October 2021	Present	4 years, 225 days	1 Primeira Liga; 1 Taça da Liga; 2 Supertaça Cândido de Oliveira

== See also ==
- List of S.L. Benfica managers
- List of S.L. Benfica players
- Supporters of S.L. Benfica
