= Manuel Damásio =

Portuguese businessman (born 1940)

- Born: Manuel Damásio Soares Garcia; 9 July 1940; Lisbon, Portugal
- Occupation: Businessman
- Known for: Presidency of Benfica
- Spouse: Margarida Pietro
- Children: 3

Manuel Damásio Soares Garcia (born 9 July 1940), known as Manuel Damásio, is a Portuguese businessman who served as the 30th president of sports club Benfica.

Born in Lisbon, Damásio was elected president of Benfica on 7 January 1994 with 87% of the votes, defeating candidate and friend José Capristano. Shortly after succeeding Jorge de Brito, Benfica won the Portuguese league title in football. Damásio then started a campaign to attract new members to the club to overcome financial difficulties, raising the number of associates from 83,000 to 150,000. He also tried to lower the club's debt with Parmalat as a sponsor; however, it did not help much.

Along with the help of Abílio Rodrigues and Gaspar Ramos, Damásio transformed Benfica's football department. His choice of football coaches was not fortunate: he signed Artur Jorge, Paulo Autuori, and Manuel José, with Mário Wilson serving as interim coach, thrice. In terms of players, Damásio spent a lot of money in failed signings, such as Nelo, José Tavares, Paulo Nunes, and Donizete, among over 100 signings. Despite the lack of football titles, which led to the termination of Damásio's three-year term in June 1996, he was reelected for another triennial term, which ended abruptly one year later. He left Benfica following new early elections and was succeeded by João Vale e Azevedo on 31 October 1997.

| Preceded by Jorge de Brito | President of Benfica; 1994–1997 | Succeeded by João Vale e Azevedo |
