= Museu Benfica =

Benfica Museum Cosme Damião
- Museu Benfica – Cosme Damião
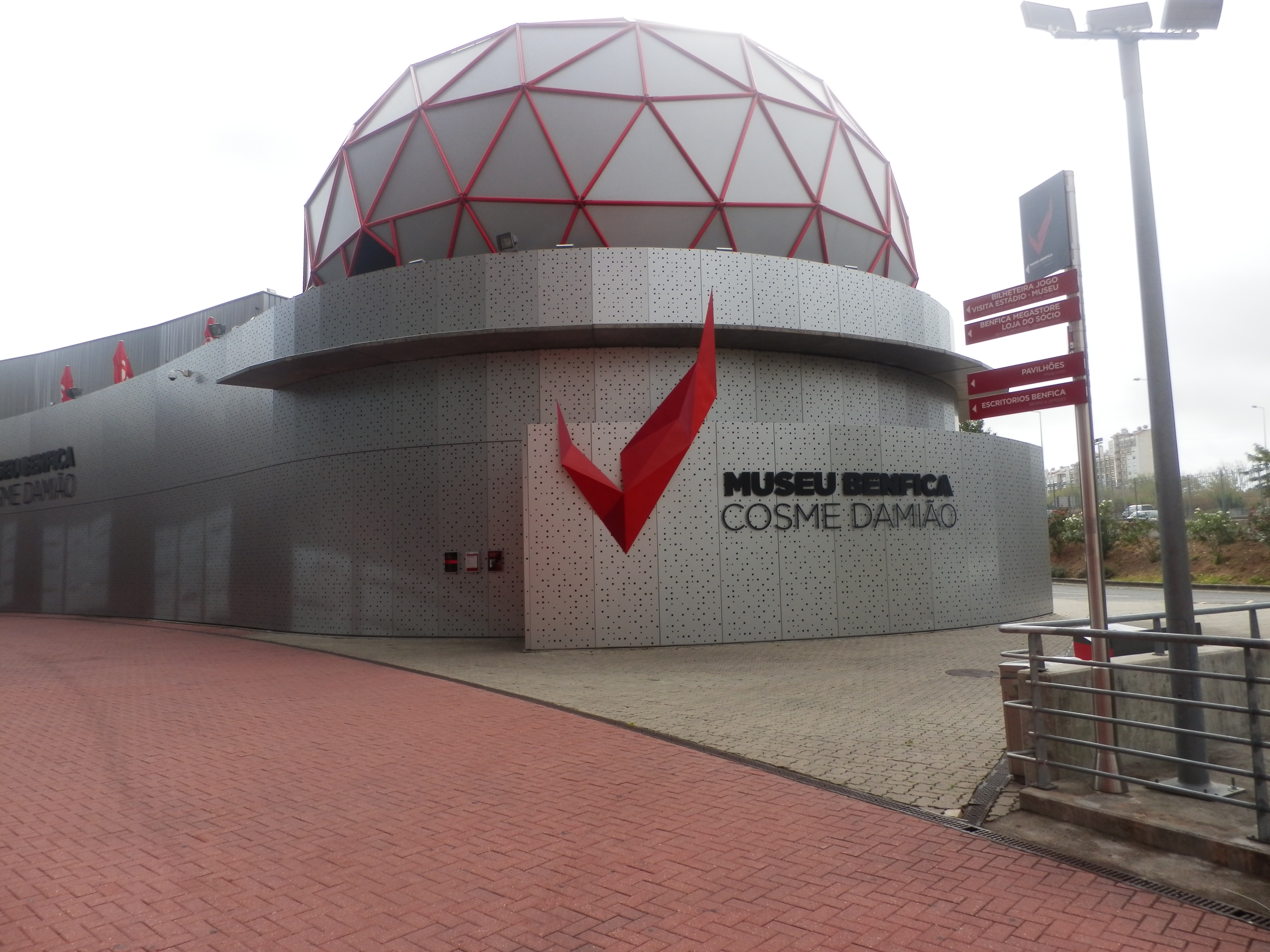
- Established: 26 July 2013
- Location: Estádio da Luz, Lisbon
- Coordinates: 38.752594°N 9.18467°W
- Type: Sports museum
- Visitors: 400,000 (24 July 2018)
- Curator: Luís Lapão
- Owner: S.L. Benfica
- Public transit access: Azul at Colégio Militar/Luz
- Website: Official website

The Museu Benfica – Cosme Damião is the museum of Portuguese sports club S.L. Benfica. Named after Cosme Damião, one of the club's founders in 1904, the museum was inaugurated on 26 July 2013 under the presidency of Luís Filipe Vieira and opened to the public on 29 July, one year and three months after the start of construction.

Located near Benfica's stadium, the building occupies 4,000 square metres and is composed of three floors, which are accompanied by a huge vertical parallelepiped made of glass exhibiting roughly 500 trophies won by the club. The museum is split into 29 thematic areas containing around 1,000 pieces from a collection of 30,000, including trophies, documents, images, audio and video related to the history of Benfica, contextualised into domestic and international historic events of the 20th century.

Moreover, the museum includes audiovisual touchscreens, a hologram of Eusébio, an area displaying photos of Benfica supporters and, lastly, an elevator surrounded by video walls showing messages and images of benfiquistas. This area transports visitors to a geodesic dome on the top of building, where a short film about the club's history is displayed.

On 12 December 2014, the Museu Benfica was awarded the prize for Best Portuguese Museum of 2014 by the Portuguese Association of Museology. As of 24 July 2018, the museum has had 400,000 visitors.
