= Jorge de Brito =

Portuguese businessman (1927–2006)

Jorge de Brito ComIH ComM
- Born: Jorge Artur Rego de Brito; 7 November 1927; Queluz, Portugal
- Died: 2 August 2006 (aged 78); Lisbon, Portugal
- Occupations: Bank clerk, banker, speculator, businessman, art collector, sports manager
- Known for: Foundation of Banco Intercontinental Português (BIP) and Brisa; presidency of S.L. Benfica
- Spouse: Ana Isabel Mafalda de Mendonça Gorjão Henriques (m. 1959)
- Children: 5
- Parent(s): Artur de Brito; Maria da Anunciação da Silva Rego

Jorge Artur Rego de Brito ComIH ComM (7 November 1927 – 2 August 2006) was a Portuguese businessman, founder of Banco Intercontinental Português (BIP) and Brisa, who served as the 29th president of sports club S.L. Benfica, succeeding João Santos.

During Brito's term at Benfica, from 24 April 1992 to 7 January 1994, its football team won the Taça de Portugal in 1993. At the end of that year, during the following season, he resigned due to financial difficulties dating back to "Verão Quente" (Hot Summer), when Benfica did not sign new players and lost two players to Lisbon rivals Sporting, thus not completing his triennal term. He was succeeded by Manuel Damásio.

Associate number 88, Brito was awarded with the Águia de Ouro (Golden Eagle) by Benfica on 14 December 1973, during the presidency of Duarte Borges Coutinho. Brito died in Lisbon, aged 78, after a long illness, and was buried at Prazeres Cemetery.

| Preceded by João Santos | President of Benfica; 1992–1994 | Succeeded by Manuel Damásio |
