= List of S.L. Benfica players (25–99 appearances) =

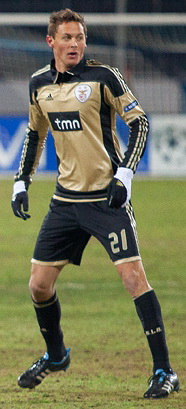
Nemanja Matić made 99 appearances for Benfica in three-and-a-half seasons.

Sport Lisboa e Benfica is a Portuguese professional football team based in São Domingos de Benfica, Lisbon. (Note: Originally located in Benfica; in 1959, the parish was split in two, with Estádio da Luz located in the new parish.) The club was formed in 1904 and played its first competitive match on 4 November 1906, when it entered the inaugural edition of the Campeonato de Lisboa. They won their first regional title in 1910, and their first nationwide in 1930, the Campeonato de Portugal, a knockout competition which determined the Portuguese champion among the winners of the regional championships. In 1934, an experimental league competition known as Primeira Liga was introduced in Portuguese football. Due to its success among the clubs, it became the official top-tier championship in 1938, in place of the Campeonato de Portugal. Since its first edition, Benfica have won a record 38 titles. Internationally, they won the European Cup twice, in 1961 and 1962.

Since their first competitive match, more than 750 players have made a competitive first-team appearance for the club, many of whom have played between 25 and 99 matches. Dimas, Tahar El Khalej, and Nemanja Matić all fell one short of 100 appearances, as they all moved elsewhere while the season was ongoing. Four former players went on to be first-team managers: Cosme Damião, Ribeiro dos Reis, Vítor Gonçalves, and Cândido Tavares. Hugo Leal, who appeared 41 times for the club, is the youngest player to have played for Benfica. He was 16 years and 335 days when he played against Sporting de Espinho on 20 April 1997. João Félix holds the club record sale at €126 million. Nemanja Matić and Darwin Núñez are the only players listed to have been selected as Primeira Liga Player of the Year. (Note: The award was created in 1970 and ran until 2000, being known as Portuguese Footballer of the Year, with Portuguese newspaper Diário Popular selecting the best player. The current award was created in 2006 and is awarded by the Portuguese League for Professional Football (LPFP).) Of the players still at the club, Samuel Dahl is the closest to 100 appearances; he has played 92 matches.

As of 29 October 2026, a total of 283 players have played between 25 and 99 competitive matches for the club. Of those players, 6 are still playing for the club.

== Key ==
- The list is ordered by date of debut.
- Appearances as a substitute are included.
- Statistics are correct up to and including the match played on 29 October 2026. Where a player left the club permanently after this date, his statistics are updated to his date of leaving.

Player
Players with name in italics were on loan from another club for part or all of their Benfica career. The loaning club is noted in the Notes column, and for the players who later signed a permanent deal, their time spent at loan is specified.

Positions key
Pre-1960s		1960s–	
GK	Goalkeeper		
FB	Full back	DF	Defender
HB	Half back	MF	Midfielder
FW	Forward		
U	Utility player		

Position
Playing positions are listed according to the tactical formations that were employed at the time. Thus the change in the names of defensive and midfield positions reflects the tactical evolution that occurred from the 1960s onwards.
Club career
Club career is defined as the first and last calendar years in which the player appeared for the club in any of the competitions listed below.
League appearances and League goals
League appearances and goals comprise those in the Campeonato de Lisboa and the Primeira Liga. Starting in the 1934–35 season, appearances are only counted in the Primeira Liga.
Total appearances and Total goals
Total appearances and goals comprise those in the Primeira Liga, Taça de Portugal (including in the early denomination as Campeonato de Portugal), Taça da Liga, Supertaça, European Cup/Champions League, UEFA Cup/Europa League, and defunct competitions such as Campeonato de Lisboa, Latin Cup, Cup Winners' Cup, Inter-Cities Fairs Cup and Intercontinental Cup
International selection
Countries are listed only for players who have been selected for international football. Only the highest level of international competition is given, except where a player competed for more than one country, in which case the highest level reached for each country is shown.
Caps
For players having played at full international level, the caps column counts the number of such appearances during his career with the club. All information relating to international selection, including number of full caps won while with the club, is sourced to Tovar (2012), pp. 679–761, unless otherwise noted.

== List of players (25 to 99 appearances) ==
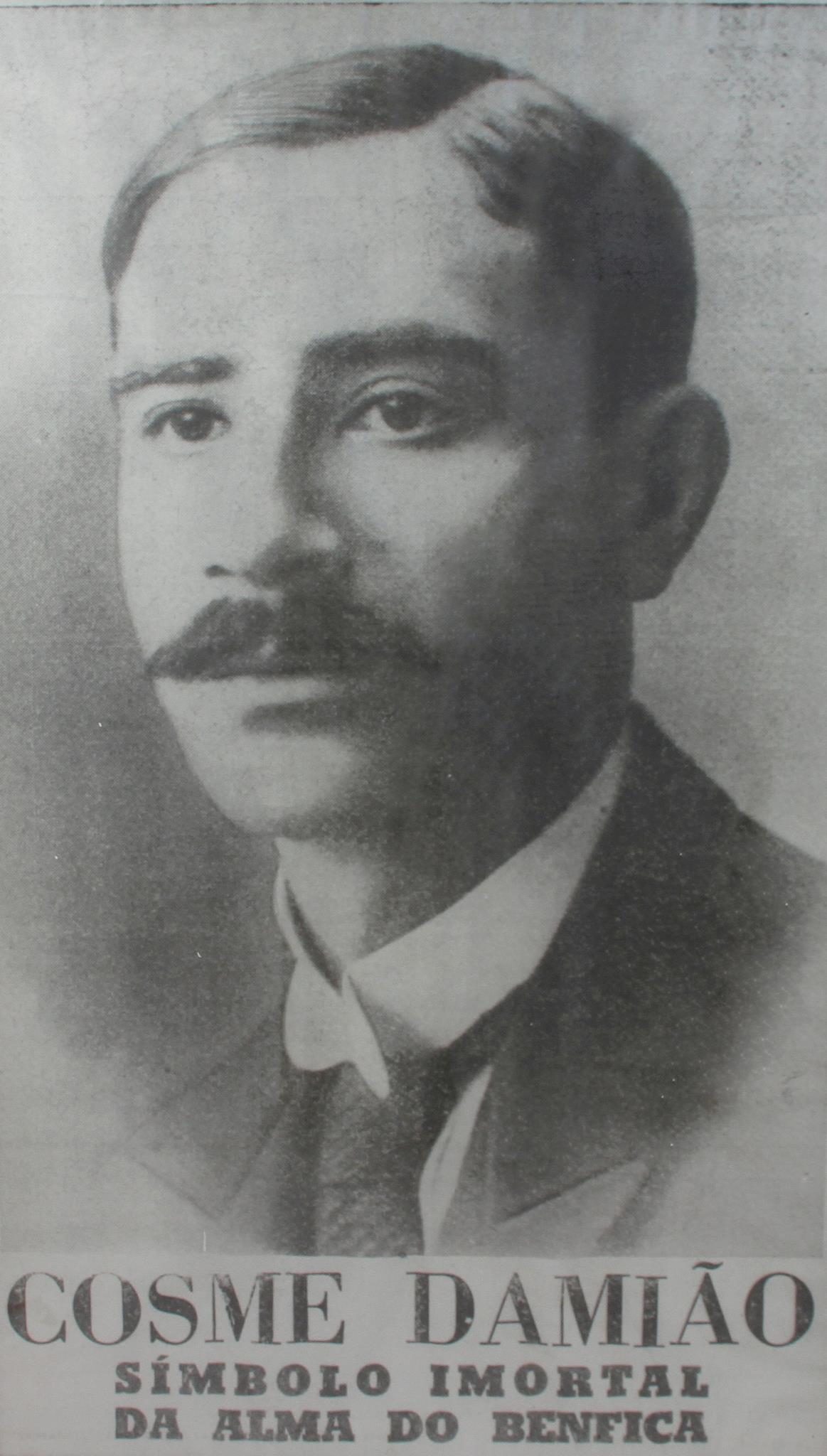
Founder Cosme Damião made 67 appearances for Benfica.

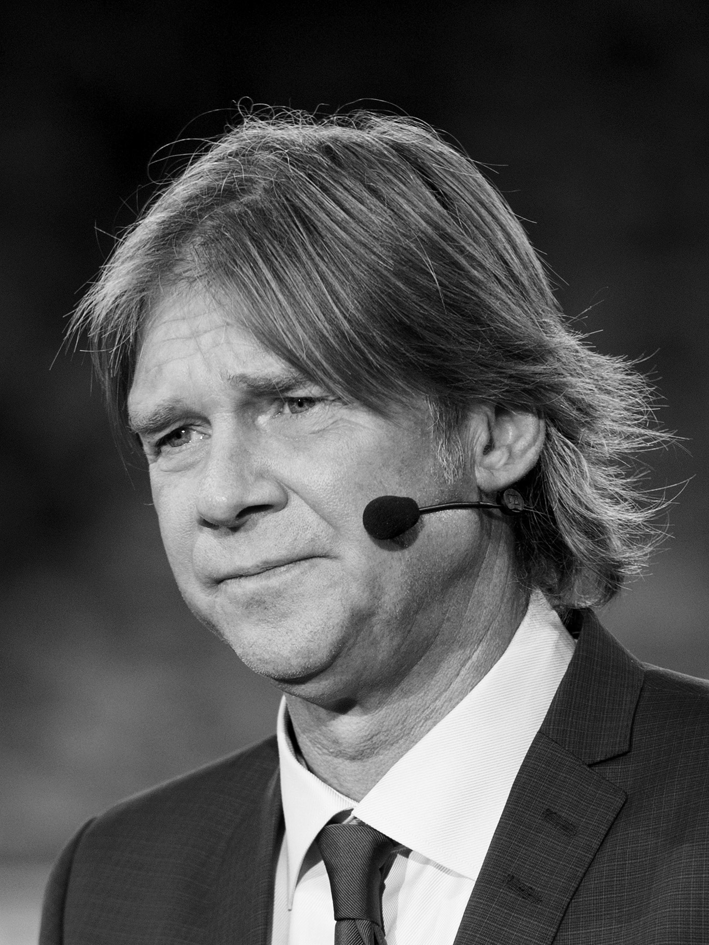
Glenn Strömberg made only 44 appearances but won two league titles.

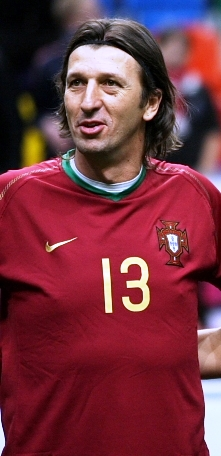
Dimas made 99 appearances between 1994 and December 1996.

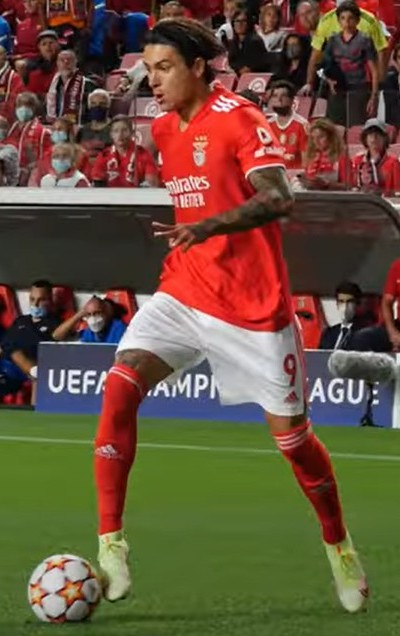
Darwin Núñez made 85 appearances for Benfica.

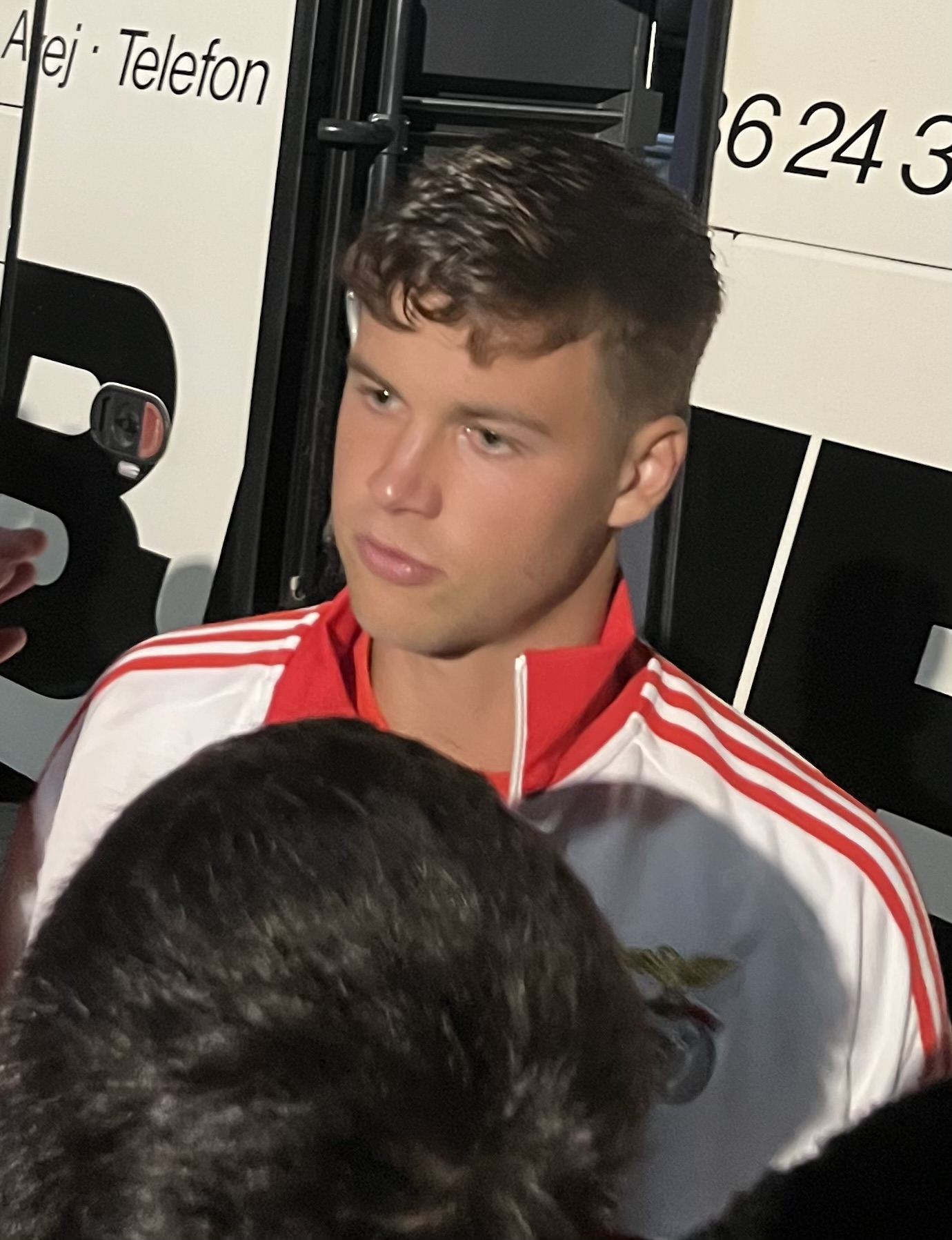
Of the 6 players currently with Benfica, Samuel Dahl is the closest to 100 appearances.

Table of players, including playing position, club statistics and international selection
Player	Pos	Club career	Apps	Goals	Apps	Goals	International selection	Caps	Notes	Refs
Player	Pos	Club career	League		Total		International selection	Caps	Notes	Refs
Henrique Costa	FB	1906–1918	63	2	63	2	—	—		
Cosme Damião	FW	1907–1916	67	8	67	8	—	—	(Note: Player who later became first-team head coach.)	
António Costa	FW	1907–1914	31	3	31	3	—	—		
Artur José Pereira	HB	1907–1914	41	6	41	6	—	—		
Luis Vieira	HB	1907–1913; 1916–1919	53	5	53	5	—	—		
Leopoldo Mocho	FB	1907–1911; 1913–1917	37	1	37	1	—	—		
António Meireles	FW	1907–1911	27	7	27	7	—	—		
Carlos Figueiredo	FW	1909–1917	39	4	39	4	—	—		
José Domingos	FW	1910–1915	25	0	25	0	—	—		
Alberto Rio	FW	1908–1918	36	18	36	18	—	—		
Francisco Belas	FW	1911–1919	26	2	26	2	—	—		
Paiva Simões	GK	1911–1919	28	0	28	0	—	—		
Herculano dos Santos	HB	1912–1923	57	30	57	30	—	—		
Francisco Pereira	FW	1912–1917	26	16	26	16	—	—		
Artur Augusto	FW	1915–1921	32	5	32	5	—	—		
Cândido de Oliveira	HB	1914–1920	32	5	32	5	—	—		
Ribeiro dos Reis	FW	1915–1916; 1917–1925	43	14	43	14	Portugal	1		
José Maria Bastos	FB	1916–1922	25	0	25	0	—	—		
Fernando Jesus	HB	1917–1925	58	0	58	0	Portugal	2		
Alberto Augusto	FW	1917–1924	39	10	39	10	Portugal	3		
António Pinho	FB	1918–1920; 1928–1930; 1932–1933	42	2	50	3	Portugal	2		
Francisco Vieira	GK	1918–1919; 1921–1926	41	0	41	0	Portugal	3		
José Pimenta	FW	1918–1928	75	2	75	2	—	—		
Vítor Gonçalves	FW	1918–1927	72	5	72	5	Portugal	2		
José Simões	FW	1919–1929	78	14	83	15	—	—		
Vítor Hugo	HB	1921–1931	84	15	95	15	—	—		
Luís Costa	FB	1924–1932; 1933–1934	42	0	72	0	—	—		
Mário Carvalho	FW	1924–1931	69	30	81	34	Portugal	2		
Artur Travassos	HB	1924–1931	31	1	43	2	—	—		
Francisco Costa	GK	1925–1927; 1933–1934	15	0	59	0	—	—		
Ralph Bailão	FB	1926–1933	58	2	89	4	—	—		
António Jacinto	GK	1926–1929	31	0	36	0	—	—		
Tamanqueiro	HB	1926–1928	27	4	38	9	Portugal	9		
Germano Campos	FW	1926–1927; 1931–1933	24	0	28	0	—	—		
Eugénio Salvador	FW	1927–1929; 1930–1934	34	15	43	20	—	—		
Manuel de Oliveira	FW	1928–1934; 1935–1936	46	6	71	17	—	—		
Guedes Gonçalves	FW	1928–1936	45	24	69	35	—	—		
João Oliveira	HB	1928–1934	55	10	73	14	Portugal	1		
Anibal José	HB	1928–1933	35	1	52	3	Portugal	4		
Artur Dyson	GK	1929–1931	21	0	39	0	—	—		
Pedro Silva	HB	1929–1934	21	8	50	24	—	—		
Augusto Dinis	HB	1929–1933	21	7	37	14	—	—		
Alberto Cardoso	FW	1930–1938	31	12	62	23	—	—		
Francisco Gatinho	FB	1930–1936	38	0	88	0	—	—		
João Correia	HB	1930–1933; 1934–1939	39	1	71	2	—	—		
Pedro da Conceição	GK	1931–1936	27	0	48	0	—	—		
Augusto Amaro	GK	1932–1939	40	0	80	0	Portugal	2		
Carlos Torres	FW	1933–1937	28	23	60	34	—	—		
Domingos Lopes	FW	1934–1939	36	6	74	16	Portugal	2		
Raul Baptista	HB	1935–1941	49	0	95	3	—	—		
Feliciano Barbosa	HB	1935–1939	15	3	45	8	—	—		
Cândido Tavares	GK	1935–1937	24	0	46	0	—	—		
António Vieira	FB	1936–1940	35	0	74	0	Portugal	2		
Ricardo Freire	FB	1936–1943	13	0	31	7	—	—		
Mário da Rosa	GK	1937–1950	34	0	47	0	—	—		
Carlos Brito	FW	1938–1946	43	26	79	44	—	—		
Elói	FB	1939–1943	38	0	75	0	—	—		
Francisco Rodrigues	FW	1939–1942	44	49	88	99	—	—		
Miguel Lourenço	FW	1939–1942	19	9	33	16	—	—		
Francisco Pires	FW	1940–1945	17	7	44	31	—	—		
Conceição Rodrigues	HB	1940–1943	18	4	39	18	—	—		
Manuel da Costa	HB	1941–1945	43	28	74	49	—	—		
Mário Galvão	FB	1941–1945	12	2	30	4	—	—		
Manuel Jordão	HB	1942–1946	15	2	29	2	—	—		
Eduardo Cerqueira	FB	1943–1949	48	0	60	0	—	—		
Mário Rui	FW	1943–1948; 1952–1954	30	18	57	24	—	—		
Artur Teixeira	FB	1943–1947	25	0	45	0	—	—		
João da Silva	HB	1943–1945	13	1	26	2	—	—		
Alfredo Melão	FW	1946–1951	61	28	73	34	—	—		
Pinto Machado	GK	1946–1949	24	0	39	0	—	—		
Vítor Baptista	FW	1946–1949	59	30	70	40	—	—		
José da Costa	HB	1947–1952	23	1	26	2	—	—		
Rogério Contreiras	GK	1947–1950	34	0	38	0	—	—		
António Manuel	HB	1948–1954	26	0	26	0	—	—		
Rosário	FW	1948–1954	76	18	96	22	—	—		
Francisco Calado	HB	1948–1958	81	10	97	14	—	—		
Zézinho	HB	1952–1960	50	9	75	11	—	—		
Vieirinha	HB	1952–1954	33	5	40	7	—	—		
Fialho	FW	1953–1956	33	9	36	9	—	—		
Salvador Martins	FW	1953–1956; 1957–1959	49	20	55	21	Portugal	4		
Leonel Pegado	HB	1954–1958	41	3	58	5	—	—		
Mário João	FB	1957–1962	48	2	89	4	Portugal	2		
António Mendes	FW	1957–1962	26	19	43	27	—	—		
António Saraiva	DF	1959–1963	29	1	50	1	—	—		
Jorge Calado	MF	1961–1968; 1969-1971	29	0	49	7	—	—		
Augusto Silva	MF	1962–1967	36	4	64	13	—	—		
Pedras	FW	1962–1966	16	7	32	19	—	—		
Yaúca	FW	1963–1968	32	23	58	42	Portugal	1		
Luciano Fernandes	DF	1963–1966	33	0	40	0	—	—		
Serafim Pereira	MF	1963–1966	24	9	44	20	Portugal	1		
Nascimento	GK	1964–1970	27	0	44	0	—	—		
Nélson Fernandes	FW	1965–1968	28	9	40	14	—	—		
Augusto Matine	MF	1967–1968; 1969–1971; 1972–1973	31	0	53	0	Portugal	8		
Zeca Miglietti	DF	1968–1972	53	0	84	1	—	—		
Rui Rodrigues	DF	1971–1974	47	1	59	2	Portugal	2		
Nelinho	FW	1972–1974; 1975–1977	46	11	55	11	Portugal	1		
Mário Moinhos	MF	1973–1977	73	21	96	26	Portugal	7		
Cavungi	MF	1975–1980	29	4	41	5	—	—		
Carlos Alhinho	DF	1976–1977; 1978–1981	74	2	90	2	Portugal	6		
Joaquim Pereirinha	DF	1977–1980	28	1	39	2	—	—		
Jorge Silva	FW	1977–1979; 1984–1985	33	12	47	16	—	—		
Frederico Rosa	DF	1979–1983	40	0	63	0	—	—		
César	FW	1979–1983	44	20	85	23	—	—		
João Laranjeira	DF	1979–1982	42	2	60	2	Portugal	3		
Jorge Gomes	FW	1979–1982	41	10	59	12	—	—		
Alberto Bastos Lopes	DF	1980–1984	23	1	35	1	—	—		
Francisco Vital	FW	1980–1981	15	1	28	4	—	—		
Zoran Filipović	FW	1981–1984	56	26	84	41	—	—		
Carlos Pereira	DF	1981–1986; 1987–1988	26	0	34	0	—	—		
Glenn Strömberg	MF	1982–1984	29	3	44	6	Sweden	10		
Dito	DF	1986–1988	55	1	81	2	Portugal	8		
Edmundo	DF	1986–1988	31	2	44	2	—	—		
Tueba	MF	1986–1988	28	2	43	3	—	—		
Chiquinho Carlos	MF	1986–1988	55	15	79	22	—	—		
António Fonseca	DF	1987–1990	39	1	49	1	Portugal	2		
Elzo	MF	1987–1989	38	1	55	1	—	—		
Hernâni Neves	MF	1988–1991; 1992–1994	33	1	49	3	Portugal	1		
Lima	FW	1988–1991	35	4	49	14	—	—		
Vata	FW	1988–1991	60	29	76	37	—	—		
Ademir Alcântara	MF	1988–1990	30	4	34	7	—	—		
Abel Campos	MF	1988–1990	49	8	64	13	—	—		
Aldair	DF	1989–1990	22	5	33	6	Brazil	8		
Fernando Mendes	DF	1989–1991; 1992–1993	27	1	35	2	Portugal	4		
Rui Bento	DF	1990–1992	24	0	38	0	Portugal	2		
Erwin Sánchez	MF	1990–1991; 1997–1998	41	7	48	8	Bolivia	14		
Vasili Kulkov	MF	1991–1994	54	6	77	11	Russia	8		
Sergei Yuran	FW	1991–1994	63	18	95	34	Russia	10		
Daniel Kenedy	DF	1992–1996	37	2	85	5	—	—		
Abel Xavier	DF	1992–1995	47	4	65	5	Portugal	1		
Aílton	FW	1993–1994; 1995–1996	32	11	38	14	—	—		
Pedro Henriques	DF	1994–1997	37	1	48	2	—	—		
Dimas	DF	1994–1997	68	4	99	5	Portugal	12		
Paulo Bento	MF	1994–1996	49	2	68	3	Portugal	2		
Paulo Pereira	DF	1994–1996	20	1	29	2	—	—		
José Tavares	MF	1994–1995	20	2	34	6	Portugal	2		
Nelo	MF	1994–1995	23	0	36	0	Portugal	4		
Edílson	FW	1994–1995	23	9	31	19	—	—	(Note: Palmeiras)	
Claudio Caniggia	FW	1994–1995	24	8	34	16	—	—		
Bruno Caires	MF	1994–1996	35	2	51	2	—	—		
Edgar Pacheco	MF	1995–1998	48	9	68	11	—	—		
Basarab Panduru	MF	1995–1998	49	7	68	12	Romania	3		
Marinho	DF	1995–1997	33	1	45	2	—	—		
Ilian Iliev	MF	1995–1997	40	4	51	4	—	—		
Paulão	MF	1995–1997	23	3	27	3	Angola	20		
Hassan Nader	FW	1995–1997	17	7	27	9	—	—		
Mauro Airez	FW	1995–1997	27	0	39	3	—	—		
Marcelo Cipriano	FW	1995–1996	27	7	39	13	—	—		
Maniche	MF	1995–1996; 1999–2001	54	11	69	14	—	—		
Tahar El Khalej	DF	1996–2000	72	10	99	11	Morocco	15		
Martin Pringle	FW	1996–1999	41	6	54	8	—	—		
Abdelkrim El Hadrioui	DF	1996–1998	21	0	29	0	—	—		
Jorge Soares	DF	1996–1998	25	2	35	2	—	—		
Tiago Pereira	MF	1996–1998	24	1	30	1	—	—		
Amaral	MF	1996–1998	24	0	45	2	Brazil	3	(Note: Parma) (Note: Was on loan in the final six months of 1996–97 and signed a permanent deal in December 1997.)	
Jorge Bermúdez	DF	1996–1997	27	1	38	2	—	—		
Serhiy Kandaurov	MF	1997–2001	67	12	81	13	—	—		
Luís Carlos	MF	1997–2000	45	1	54	1	Portugal	1		
Bruno Basto	DF	1997–2000	48	1	58	1	—	—		
Sergei Ovchinnikov	GK	1997–1999	20	0	28	0	Russia	24		
José Sousa	DF	1997–1999	25	1	45	1	—	—		
Scott Minto	DF	1997–1999	31	0	42	0	—	—		
Hugo Leal	MF	1997–1999	31	3	41	3	Portugal	1		
Luís Andrade	MF	1998–2000; 2001–2003	41	0	53	0	—	—		
Michael Thomas	MF	1998–1999	18	1	25	1	—	—		
Mark Pembridge	MF	1998–1999	19	1	28	3	Wales	6		
Robert Enke	GK	1999–2002	77	0	93	0	—	—		
João Tomás	FW	1999–2001	41	19	46	20	Portugal	2		
Chano	MF	1999–2001	56	2	65	3	—	—		
Sérgio Nunes	DF	1999–2001	20	2	28	2	—	—		
Ricardo Rojas	DF	1999–2001	25	2	42	0	—	—		
Jorge Ribeiro	DF	1999–2000; 2001–2002; 2008–2009	20	1	28	2	—	—		
Carlitos	MF	2000–2004	46	5	50	5	—	—		
Ednilson	MF	2000–2002	35	0	44	0	—	—		
Fernando Meira	DF	2000–2002	46	2	55	2	Portugal	11		
Diogo Luís	DF	2000–2002	23	0	28	0	—	—		
Pierre van Hooijdonk	FW	2000–2001	30	19	35	23	—	—		
Abdel Sattar Sabry	MF	2000–2001	37	8	42	9	Egypt	18		
Roger	MF	2000–2001; 2002–2004	36	6	44	7	—	—		
Argel	DF	2001–2005	79	6	97	6	—	—		
Tomo Šokota	FW	2001–2005	60	21	79	28	Croatia	8		
Anders Andersson	MF	2001–2004	49	1	57	1	Sweden	9		
Ljubinko Drulović	MF	2001–2003	50	5	54	6	—	—		
João Pinto	DF	2001–2003	48	4	52	4	Portugal	1		
Marco Caneira	DF	2001–2002	27	0	29	0	Portugal	2	(Note: Inter Milan)	
Fernando Aguiar	MF	2001–2002; 2003–2004	38	3	45	3	—	—		
Armando Sá	DF	2002–2004	48	1	57	1	—	—		
Tiago	MF	2002–2004	75	19	89	25	Portugal	10		
Miklós Fehér	FW	2002–2004	30	7	37	8	Hungary	5		
Cristiano	DF	2002–2004	24	1	31	1	—	—		
João Pereira	DF	2003–2006	58	4	85	7	—	—		
Manuel Fernandes	MF	2003–2006	67	3	97	4	Portugal	2		
Takis Fyssas	DF	2003–2005	30	0	41	1	Greece	21		
Nuno Assis	MF	2004–2008	56	4	83	6	—	—		
Alcides	DF	2004–2006	20	0	34	0	—	—	(Note: Chelsea)	
Manuel dos Santos	DF	2004–2006	24	0	38	1	—	—		
Bruno Aguiar	MF	2004–2005	18	0	31	0	—	—		
Azar Karadas	FW	2004–2005	27	4	36	6	Norway	5		
Anderson	DF	2005–2007	48	4	73	5	—	—		
Fabrizio Miccoli	FW	2005–2007	39	14	56	19	—	—	(Note: Juventus)	
Giorgos Karagounis	MF	2005–2007	45	3	67	3	Greece	17		
Beto	MF	2005–2007	30	0	48	1	—	—		
Marcelo Moretto	GK	2005–2007; 2008–2009	19	0	29	0	—	—		
Edcarlos	DF	2007–2008	16	0	27	0	—	—		
Cristian Rodríguez	MF	2007–2008	24	6	36	7	Uruguay	8	(Note: Paris Saint-Germain)	
Miguel Vítor	DF	2007–2011; 2012	24	0	45	0	—	—		
Luís Filipe	DF	2007–2008; 2009–2011	23	0	40	0	—	—		
Gilles Binya	MF	2007–2009	23	0	39	0	Cameroon	10		
Fábio Coentrão	DF	2007; 2009–2011	52	2	97	8	Portugal	14		
Sidnei	DF	2008–2011; 2012	45	6	75	7	—	—		
José Antonio Reyes	MF	2008–2009	26	4	35	6	—	—	(Note: Atlético Madrid)	
Hassan Yebda	MF	2008–2009	25	1	34	2	—	—		
Jonathan Urretaviscaya	MF	2008–2010; 2012–2014	15	2	27	2	—	—		
César Peixoto	DF	2009–2011	31	0	65	1	—	—		
Ramires	MF	2009–2010	26	4	42	5	Brazil	9		
Weldon	FW	2009–2011	16	5	27	6	—	—		
Alan Kardec	FW	2010–2011; 2012–2013	23	3	43	8	—	—		
Felipe Menezes	MF	2010–2011	13	0	29	2	—	—		
Airton Santos	MF	2010–2015	19	0	34	0	—	—		
Franco Jara	FW	2010–2011; 2014–2015	29	6	47	11	—	—		
Nolito	MF	2011–2013	35	12	63	16	—	—		
Bruno César	MF	2011–2013	32	10	60	13	Brazil	2		
Axel Witsel	MF	2011–2012	32	1	52	5	Belgium	8		
Emerson	DF	2011–2012	24	0	39	0	—	—		
Nemanja Matić	MF	2011–2013	56	6	99	9	Serbia	7		
André Gomes	MF	2012–2014	14	2	41	4	Portugal	1		
Lorenzo Melgarejo	DF	2012–2013	21	2	40	2	Paraguay	2		
Ola John	MF	2012–2013; 2014–2015	53	3	90	9	Netherlands	1		
Miralem Sulejmani	MF	2013–2015	15	1	34	3	Serbia	4		
Lazar Marković	MF	2013–2014	26	5	49	7	Serbia	7		
Sílvio	DF	2013–2016	13	0	40	0	Portugal	1		
Victor Lindelöf	DF	2013–2017	48	2	72	2	Sweden	12		
Guilherme Siqueira	MF	2013–2014	18	1	33	1	—	—		
Jan Oblak	GK	2013–2014	16	0	26	0	Slovenia	3		
Talisca	FW	2014–2016	52	12	78	20	—	—		
Derley	FW	2014–2015	14	1	27	2	—	—		
Júlio César	GK	2014–2017	57	0	83	0	—	—		
Gonçalo Guedes	MF	2014–2017;2023–2024	60	6	97	13	Portugal	2	(Note: Wolverhampton Wanderers) (Note: Was on loan in 2022–23 and 2023–24.)	
Lisandro López	DF	2014–2017	32	4	54	6	—	—		
Kostas Mitroglou	FW	2015–2017	60	36	88	52	Greece	14	(Note: Fulham) (Note: Was on loan in 2015–16 and signed a permanent deal in 2016–17.)	
Renato Sanches	MF	2015–2016;2024–2025	33	2	55	3	Portugal	9	(Note: Was on loan in 2024–25.)	
Mehdi Carcela	MF	2015–2016	20	2	29	3	Morocco	1		
Nélson Semedo	DF	2015–2017	42	3	65	4	Portugal	6		
Ederson	GK	2015–2017	37	0	58	0	—	—		
André Carrillo	MF	2016–2017	19	1	31	3	Peru	5		
Andrija Živković	MF	2016–2020	55	3	88	4	Serbia	12		
Filipe Augusto	MF	2017–2018	16	0	27	0	—	—		
Bruno Varela	GK	2017–2019	29	0	35	0	—	—		
Filip Krovinović	MF	2017–2019	17	1	28	2	—	—		
Diogo Gonçalves	MF	2017–2018;2020–2023	61	1	98	3	—	—		
Gedson Fernandes	MF	2018–2020;2021	32	0	63	3	Portugal	2		
João Félix	FW	2018–2019	26	15	43	20	Portugal	1		
Ferro	DF	2019–2020;2021	43	3	67	4	—	—		
Carlos Vinícius	FW	2019–2020;2021	34	18	50	24	—	—		
Jota	MF	2019–2020	23	0	34	2	—	—		
Tomás Tavares	DF	2019–2020	12	0	26	0	—	—		
Nuno Tavares	DF	2019–2021	25	1	41	1	—	—		
Morato	DF	2019–2024	47	1	86	2	—	—		
Everton Soares	MF	2020–2022	59	10	95	15	Brazil	11		
Luca Waldschmidt	FW	2020–2021	29	9	43	12	Germany	6		
Darwin Núñez	FW	2020–2022	57	32	85	48	Uruguay	3		
Jan Vertonghen	DF	2020–2022	57	0	89	1	Belgium	8		
Pedrinho	MF	2020–2021	19	0	31	1	—	—		
Helton Leite	GK	2020–2023	17	0	34	0	—	—		
Lucas Veríssimo	DF	2021–2023	26	5	41	5	Brazil	1		
Roman Yaremchuk	FW	2021–2022	25	6	47	9	Ukraine	2		
Valentino Lazaro	DF	2021–2022	18	0	29	0	—	—		
Soualiho Meïté	MF	2021–2022	17	0	27	0	—	—		
Paulo Bernardo	MF	2021–2023	17	0	26	0	—	—		
Enzo Fernández	MF	2022–2023	17	1	29	4	Argentina	10		
David Neres	MF	2022–2024	55	11	83	17	—	—		
Petar Musa	FW	2022–2024	44	12	66	17	Croatia	6		
João Neves	MF	2022–2024	50	4	75	4	Portugal	3		
Tiago Gouveia	MF	2022–2025	20	3	40	5	—	—		
Henrique Araújo	FW	2022–2023;2025–2026	15	3	31	5	—	—		
Orkun Kökçü	MF	2023–2025	60	14	98	19	Turkey	13		
Arthur Cabral	FW	2023–2025	49	8	77	18	—	—		
Casper Tengstedt	FW	2023–2024	21	4	35	4	—	—		
Álvaro Carreras	DF	2024–2025	43	4	68	5	—	—	(Note: Manchester United) (Note: Was on loan in 2023–24 and signed a permanent deal in 2024–25.)	
Benjamín Rollheiser	MF	2024–2025	18	2	27	2	—	—	(Note: Estudiantes (LP)) (Note: Was on loan in 2023–24 and signed a permanent deal in 2024–25.)	
Kerem Aktürkoğlu	MF	2024–2025	30	11	58	17	Turkey	6		
Zeki Amdouni	FW	2024–2025	24	7	43	9	Switzerland	6	(Note: Burnley)	
Gianluca Prestianni	MF	2024–	47	9	73	14	Argentina	3		
Samuel Dahl	DF	2025–	53	2	92	3	Sweden	1	(Note: Roma) (Note: Was on loan in 2024–25 and signed a permanent deal in 2025–26.)	
Enzo Barrenechea	MF	2025–	31	1	54	2	—	—		
Richard Ríos	MF	2025–2026	29	5	51	8	Colombia	5		
Franjo Ivanović	FW	2025–2026	25	6	43	8	Croatia	5		
Amar Dedić	DF	2025–2026	25	1	46	1	Bosnia and Herzegovina	4		
Heorhiy Sudakov	MF	2025–	30	5	54	6	Ukraine	3		
Samuel Soares	GK	2026–	19	0	35	0	—	—		
Dodi Lukébakio	MF	2026–	25	0	38	5	Belgium	7		

== See also ==
- List of S.L. Benfica records and statistics

== Footnotes ==
Player statistics include games played while on loan from:
