= 1930 Campeonato de Portugal final =

- Event: 1929–30 Campeonato de Portugal
Benfica	Barreirense
3	1
- After extra time.
- Date: 1 June 1930
- Venue: Campo Grande, Lisbon
- Referee: Silvestre Rosmaninho (Lisbon)

The 1930 Campeonato de Portugal Final was the final match of the 1929–30 Campeonato de Portugal, the 9th season of the Campeonato de Portugal, the Portuguese football knockout tournament, organized by the Portuguese Football Federation (FPF). The match was played on 1 June 1930 at the Campo de Palhavã in Lisbon between Benfica and Barreirense, and the former won 3–1 after extra-time to claim their first-ever Campeonato de Portugal.

According to the regulations, the final should have been played on a neutral field, but the Lisbon Football Association arranged the meeting to be held at Campo Grande, the playing field of Benfica. Benfica player João Oliveira had been suspended for attacking a referee in a game weeks before, but at the last minute, this Oliveira was "amnestied" from his eight-month punishment in order to be able to play in the final. And in addition to all this, Silvestre Rosmaninho, one of Benfica's oldest partners, was appointed as the referee of the final. The Barreirense protests, which reached the final without a single defeat throughout the whole season, were ignored, and after scoring the opening goal, Benfica equalized still in the first half during an illegal play due to Benfica players pushing the Barreirense goalkeeper Francisco Câmara into the goal before the ball went in. In extra time, the amnestied Oliveira scored Benfica's second goal in an eventual 3–1 victory.

== Match ==
=== Details ===
1 June 1930

Benfica	3–1	Barreirense
Augusto Dinis 22'; Oliveira 97'; Gonçalves 110'		José Correia 5'

Campo Grande, Lisbon
Referee: Silvestre Rosmaninho (Lisbon)

Benfica	Barreirense

GK	(Portugal) Artur Dyson
DF	(Portugal) Manuel de Oliveira
DF	(Portugal) Anibal José
MF	(Portugal) António Pinho
MF	(Portugal) Jorge Teixeira
MF	(Portugal) Vítor Hugo
FW	(Portugal) João Oliveira
FW	(Portugal) Mário de Carvalho
FW	(Portugal) António Gonçalves
FW	(Portugal) Jorge Tavares
FW	(Portugal) Augusto Dinis
Substitutes:
Manager:
(England) Arthur John

GK	(Portugal) Francisco Câmara
DF	(Portugal) Luís Falcão
DF	(Portugal) José da Fonseca
DF	(Portugal) José João
DF	(Portugal) Carvalhinho
MF	(Portugal) Álvaro Pina
MF	(Portugal) Raúl Jorge
FW	(Portugal) Bento de Almeida
FW	(Portugal) João Pireza
FW	(Portugal) José Correia
FW	(Portugal) Pedro Pireza
Substitutes:
Manager:
(Germany) Augusto Sabbo

1929–30 Campeonato de Portugal Winners
Benfica
1st Title

Match officials

- Assistant referees:
- Fourth official:

Match rules

- 90 minutes.
