= 1931 Campeonato de Portugal final =

- Event: 1930–31 Campeonato de Portugal
Benfica	Porto
3	0
- Date: 28 June 1931
- Venue: Campo do Arnado, Coimbra
- Referee: António Palhinhas (Lisbon)

The 1931 Campeonato de Portugal Final was the final match of the 1930–31 Campeonato de Portugal, the 10th season of the Campeonato de Portugal, the Portuguese football knockout tournament, organized by the Portuguese Football Federation (FPF). The match was played on 28 June 1931 at the Campo do Arnado in Coimbra between Benfica and Porto, and the former won 3–0 to claim its second Campeonato de Portugal. Most important than the result, however, was its historical significance, as this was the very first official competitive match in their historic rivalry; they had already faced each other a few times in the 1910s and 1920s, but only in friendly matches.

== Match ==
Benfica drew first blood in the 37th minute with a goal from Vítor Silva, and then doubled their lead just before half-time thanks to Augusto Dinis. In the second half, Silva scored his second of the night to seal a 3–0 victory.

=== Details ===
28 June 1930

Benfica	3–0	Porto
Vítor Silva 37', 65'; Augusto Dinis 44'

Campo do Arnado, Coimbra
Referee: António Palhinhas (Lisbon)

Benfica	Porto

GK	(Portugal) Artur Dyson
DF	(Portugal) Luis Costa
DF	(Portugal) Ralph Bailão
MF	(Portugal) João Correia
MF	(Portugal) Anibal José
MF	(Portugal) Pedro Ferreira
FW	(Portugal) João Oliveira
FW	(Portugal) Emiliano Sampaio
FW	(Portugal) Augusto Dinis
FW	(Portugal) Manuel de Oliveira
FW	(Portugal) Vítor Silva
Substitutes:
Manager:
(England) Arthur John

GK	(Hungary) Mihály Siska
DF	(Portugal) Avelino Martins
DF	(Portugal) Pedro Temudo
DF	(Portugal) Valdemar Mota
DF	(Portugal) Acácio Mesquita
MF	(Portugal) Euclides Anaura
MF	(Portugal) Filipe dos Santos
FW	(Portugal) Raúl Castro
FW	(Portugal) Armando Lopes Carneiro
FW	(Portugal) Álvaro
FW	(England) Norman Hall
Substitutes:
Manager:
(Hungary) József Szabó

1930–31 Campeonato de Portugal Winners
Benfica
2nd Title

Match officials

- Assistant referees:
- Fourth official:

Match rules

- 90 minutes.

== Aftermath ==
Benfica and Porto only had to wait a year for their second official match, which took place in Benfica's home stadium of Campo das Amoreiras in the semifinals of the 1931–32 Campeonato de Portugal, and in which Porto was able to achieve its revenge with a 2–1 win.
