= 1957 Taça de Portugal final =

- Event: 1956–67 Taça de Portugal
Benfica	Sporting da Covilhã
3	1
- Date: 2 June 1957
- Venue: Estádio Nacional, Oeiras
- Referee: Francisco Guerra (Porto)

The 1957 Taça de Portugal final was the final match of the 1956–57 Taça de Portugal, the 17th season of the Taça de Portugal, the premier Portuguese football cup competition organized by the Portuguese Football Federation (FPF). The match was played on 2 June 1957 at the Estádio Nacional in Oeiras, and opposed two Primeira Liga sides: Benfica and Sporting da Covilhã. Benfica defeated Sporting da Covilhã 3–1 to claim a ninth Taça de Portugal.

== Match ==
=== Details ===
2 June 1957

Benfica	3–1	Sporting da Covilhã
Salvador 12'; Águas 15'; Coluna 87'		Pires 19'

Estádio Nacional, Oeiras
Referee: Francisco Guerra (Porto)

Benfica	Sporting da Covilhã

GK	1	(Portugal) José de Bastos
DF		(Portugal) Jacinto Marques (c)
DF		(Portugal) Zézinho
DF		(Portugal) Ângelo Martins
DF		(Portugal) Manuel Serra
MF		(Portugal) Francisco Palmeiro
MF		(Portugal) Mário Coluna
MF		(Portugal) Domiciano Cavém
MF		(Portugal) Leonel Pegado
FW		(Portugal) José Águas
FW		(Portugal) Félix Salvador
Substitutes:
Manager:
(Brazil) Otto Glória

GK	1	(Portugal) Zé Rita
DF		(Portugal) Hélder Toledo
DF		(Portugal) Jorge Nicolau
DF		(Portugal) António Lourenço
MF		(Spain) Pedro Martín
MF		(Portugal) Francisco Manteigueiro
MF		(Spain) Victoriano Suárez
MF		(Portugal) Amílcar Cavém
FW		(Portugal) Fernando Cabrita
FW		(Portugal) Carlos Ferreira (c)
FW		(Portugal) Fernando Pires
Substitutes:
Manager:
(Portugal) Tavares da Silva

1956–57 Taça de Portugal Winners
Benfica
9th Title

Match officials

- Assistant referees:
- Fourth official:

Match rules

- 90 minutes.
- 30 minutes of extra time if necessary.
