= Pedro Silva =

Pedro Silva may refer to:

- Pedro Adão e Silva (born 1974), Portuguese politician
- Pedro da Silva (post courier) (1647–1717), Portuguese-Canadian post courier
- Pedro Silva (baseball) (1900–?), Cuban baseball player
- Pedro Silva Calderón (1893–1967), Chilean police officer, director of the Carabineros
- Pedro Silva Fernández (fl. 1960s, Chilean jurist, justice of the Supreme Court
- Pedro Silva Gil (1820–1883), Peruvian Army officer
- Pedro Silva (Portuguese footballer) (fl. 1929-1934), Portuguese football half-back
- Pedro de Silva (born 1945), Spanish politician and writer
- Pedro da Silva (decathlete) (born 1966), Brazilian decathlete
- Pedro Silva y Tenorio (died 1479), prelate of the Roman Catholic Church
- Pedro Silva (swimmer) (born 1977), Portuguese freestyle swimmer
- Pedro Silva (Brazilian footballer) (born 1981), Brazilian football defender
- Pedro da Silva (canoeist) (born 1993), Brazilian canoeist
- Pedro Silva (footballer, born 1997), Portuguese goalkeeper
