= João Oliveira =

João Oliveira may refer to:

- João Oliveira (footballer, born 1906) (1906–?), Portuguese footballer
- João Oliveira (politician) (born 1979), Portuguese politician
- João Paulo de Oliveira (born 1981), Brazilian racing driver
- João Paulo Oliveira (born 1985), Brazilian footballer
- João Oliveira (footballer, born 1992), Portuguese footballer
- João Oliveira (volleyball) (born 1995), Portuguese volleyball player
- João Oliveira (Swiss footballer) (born 1996), Swiss footballer
- João Oliveira (footballer, born 1998), Portuguese footballer
