= Mário da Rosa =

Portuguese footballer

Personal information
- Date of birth: 1917
- Place of birth: Vila Real de Santo António, Portugal
- Date of death: deceased
- Place of death: Portugal
- Position(s): Goalkeeper

Senior career*
Years	Team	Apps	(Gls)
1937–1950	Benfica	34	(0)
- *Club domestic league appearances and goals

Mário da Rosa (1917 – deceased), is a former Portuguese footballer who played as a goalkeeper.

He was most known for his thirteen-year spell at Benfica, where he won three league titles.

== Career ==
Born in Vila Real de Santo António, Rosa joined Benfica in 1937, making his debut on 8 May 1938 in a match against Académica. It was his only appearance all season, as Amaro was undisputed starter. Nonetheless, it was enough for him to be a part of the league title. The following season, new signing Martins surpassed him and Amaro to take the goalkeeper position, holding it tightly for six seasons, with Rosa relegated to about handful of appearances. In 1944–45, he finally overtook Martins and played 21 games, 13 in the league, to help Benfica win the league.

However, he could not retain his place in the next season, with Martins appearing again to be the first choice. In 1946 and then in 1947, Benfica signed Pinto Machado and Contreiras, which further complicated his opportunities to play. Still, in 1949–50, Rosa overtook them all to be the most used goalkeeper in the league, winning his third league title.

== Honours ==
Benfica

- Primeira Divisão: 1937–38, 1944–45, 1949–50
