= List of Vitória F.C. seasons =

Evolution of Vitória Futebol Clube's league performances since 1938

Vitória Futebol Clube is a Portuguese sports club from Setúbal, popularly known as Vitória de Setúbal.

== League and Cup history ==
With the 2007–08 season, Vitória completed 60 presences at the top level of Portuguese football.

Season	Cup	Regional League									Notes
Season	Cup	Tier	Pos.	Pl.	W	D	L	GS	GA	P	Notes
1918–19	non-existent yet	Lisbon	3	8	5	0	3	11	10	10
1919–20	non-existent yet	Lisbon	4	7	2	1	4	8	11	5
1920–21	non-existent yet	Lisbon	6	6	1	3	2	7	8	5
1921–22	–	–	–	–	–	–	–	–	–	–	not enrolled
1922–23	–	–	–	–	–	–	–	–	–	–	not enrolled
1923–24	¼ final	Lisbon	1	?	?	?	?	?	?	?
1924–25	not qualified	Lisbon	0	0	0	0	8	7	27	0
1925–26	not qualified	Lisbon	4	14	8	2	4	34	23	18
1926–27	runner-up	Lisbon	1								Setúbal district created
1927–28	semi-final	Setúbal	1								Setúbal League created
1928–29	semi-final	Setúbal	1
1929–30	¼ final	Setúbal
1930–31	semi-final	Setúbal	1
1931–32	last 16	Setúbal	1
1933–33	semi-final	Setúbal	1
1933–34	semi-final	Setúbal	1

Season	National League									Cup	Regional League									Notes
Season	Tier	Pos.	Pl.	W	D	L	GS	GA	P	Cup	Tier	Pos.	Pl.	W	D	L	GS	GA	P	Notes
1934–35	1	5	14	7	2	5	26	24	16	¼ final	Setúbal	1
1935–36	1	5	14	7	2	5	32	26	16	¼ final	Setúbal	1
1936–37	1	7	14	3	1	10	18	45	7	¼ final	Setúbal	1
1937–38	2									last 16	Setúbal
1938–39	2									not qualified	Setúbal
1939–40	1	10	18	1	3	14	7	67	5	last 16	Setúbal
1940–41	2									not qualified	Setúbal
1941–42	2									not qualified	Setúbal
1942–43	2									runner-up	Setúbal
1943–44	1	7	18	7	3	8	52	50	17	¼ final	Setúbal	1
1944–45	1	5	18	9	1	8	44	49	19	semi-final	Setúbal	1
1945–46	1	7	22	8	2	12	47	59	18	last 16	Setúbal	1
1946–47	1	12	26	8	4	14	45	50	20	not held*	Setúbal	1								*due to overscheduling

Season	National League									Portuguese Cup	European Cups		Notes
Season	Tier	Pos.	Pl.	W	D	L	GS	GA	P	Portuguese Cup	Cup	Round	Notes
1947–48	1	10	26	8	3	15	38	64	19	last 32
1948–49	1	12	26	8	4	14	39	61	20	semi-final
1949–50	1	10	26	10	3	13	50	70	23	not held*			*due to Latin Cup
1950–51	1	12	26	8	4	14	31	58	20	last 16
1951–52	2									not qualified
1952–53	1	6	26	11	5	10	40	33	27	last 16
1953–54	1	12	26	7	4	15	51	66	18	runner-up
1954–55	1	8	26	8	6	12	37	52	22	last 16
1955–56	1	9	26	7	6	13	57	64	20	last 32
1956–57	1	10	26	8	4	14	40	59	20	semi-final
1957–58	1	11	26	9	4	13	37	59	22	¼ final
1958–59	1	6	26	11	5	10	53	64	27	last 32
1959–60	1	13	26	5	8	13	26	52	18	last 32
1960–61	2	3	26	17	5	4	87	25	39	¼ final			Missed 2nd place by 1pt and 1st by 2pts
1961–62	2	2	26	21	2	3	86	20	44	runner-up			Promoted by repechage. Qualified to CWC.
1962–63	1	9	26	6	8	12	33	39	20	last 64	CWC	preliminary round
1963–64	1	7	26	12	5	9	46	41	29	¼ final
1964–65	1	6	26	15	2	9	61	30	32	winner
1965–66	1	5	26	11	7	8	51	36	29	runner-up	CWC	1st round
1966–67	1	5	26	10	7	9	27	25	27	winner	FC	2nd round
1967–68	1	5	26	14	6	6	43	20	34	runner-up	CWC	2nd round
1968–69	1	4	26	13	9	4	45	20	35	last 32	FC	¼ final
1969–70	1	3	26	16	4	6	58	26	36	last 32	FC	3rd round
1970–71	1	4	26	15	4	7	51	16	34	semi-final	FC	¼ final
1971–72	1	2	30	17	11	2	62	16	45	¼ final	UC	2nd round	All-time best final standing
1972–73	1	3	30	16	6	8	65	26	38	runner-up	UC	¼ final
1973–74	1	3	30	19	7	4	69	21	45	last 32	UC	¼ final	All-time largest nr.of W, GS and best GΔ
1974–75	1	7	30	11	7	12	48	36	29	¼ final	UC	1st round
1975–76	1	9	30	8	10	12	39	42	26	semi-final
1976–77	1	6	30	13	6	11	47	46	32	last 16
1977–78	1	9	30	8	10	12	29	40	26	last 32
1978–79	1	7	30	12	7	11	38	38	31	2nd round
1979–80	1	12	30	9	5	16	29	41	23	¼ final
1980–81	1	7	30	9	11	10	30	30	29	semi-final
1981–82	1	8	30	9	10	11	30	35	28	3rd round
1982–83	1	7	30	12	5	13	29	33	29	2nd round
1983–84	1	5	30	13	8	9	43	28	34	last 32
1984–85	1	11	30	7	11	12	35	50	25	2nd round
1985–86	1	14	30	7	8	15	32	42	22	last 32
1986–87	2	1	30	21	6	3	57	16	48	2nd round			Play-off: Pos(2)Pl(4)W(2)D(1)L(1)GS(10)GA(8)P(5)
1987–88	1	8	38	15	10	13	56	43	40	last 32
1988–89	1	5	38	15	12	11	44	37	42	3rd round
1989–90	1	7	34	14	8	12	39	34	36	¼ final

Season	National League									National Cups		European Cups		Notes
Season	Tier	Pos.	Pl.	W	D	L	GS	GA	P	Portuguese Cup	League Cup	Cup	Round	Notes
1990–91	1	17	38	11	10	17	53	53	32	last 32
1991–92	2	5	34	17	5	12	48	35	39	last 32
1992–93	2	3	34	17	13	4	69	30	47	last 16
1993–94	1	6	34	14	6	14	56	42	34	last 16
1994–95	1	18	34	3	13	18	25	45	19	semi-final
1995–96	2	2	34	18	8	8	55	22	62	last 32
1996–97	1	12	34	10	10	14	38	42	40	last 16
1997–98	1	13	34	10	7	17	38	43	37	last 64
1998–99	1	5	34	15	8	11	37	38	53	semi-final
1999–00	1	16	34	9	6	19	25	49	33	last 32		UC	1st round
2000–01	2	3	34	19	7	8	64	41	64	last 64
2001–02	1	13	34	9	11	14	40	46	38	last 32
2002–03	1	18	34	6	13	15	40	53	31	¼ final
2003–04	2	2	34	18	10	6	66	41	64	last 16
2004–05	1	10	34	11	11	12	46	45	44	winner
2005–06	1	8	34	14	4	16	28	33	46	runner-up		UC	1st round	Qualified to UC
2006–07	1	14	30	5	9	16	21	45	24	last 64		UC	1st round
2007–08	1	6	30	11	12	7	37	33	45	semi-final	winner
2008–09	1	14	30	7	5	18	21	46	26	last 16	3rd round	UC	1st round
2009–10	1	14	30	5	10	15	29	57	25	last 32	2nd round
2010–11	1	12	30	8	10	12	29	42	34	last 8	2nd round
2011–12	1	11	30	8	6	16	24	49	30	last 64	3rd round
2012–13	1	12	30	7	5	18	30	55	26	last 32	3rd round
2013–14	1	7	30	10	9	11	41	41	39	last 16	3rd round
2014–15	1	14	34	7	8	19	24	56	29	last 32	semi-final
2015–16	1	15	34	6	12	16	40	61	30	last 16	2nd round
2016–17	1	12	34	10	8	16	30	39	38	last 16	semi-final

== European performance ==
Despite never winning or reaching a final in the UEFA Cup, in a span of six years (between 1967 and 1973) Vitória was four times quarter-finalist, having defeated such teams as Liverpool, Fiorentina, Anderlecht, Internazionale and Leeds United.

European seasons

Season	Cup	Round	Opponent	Aggregate	(1st leg)	Result	(2nd leg)	Result	Notes
1962–63	Cup Winners' Cup	1/16	(France) Saint-Étienne	1–4	Away	1–1	Home	0–3
1965–66	Cup Winners' Cup	1/16	(Denmark) AGF Aarhus	2–4	Away	1–2	Home	1–2
1966–67	Inter-Cities Fairs Cup	1/16	(Italy) Juventus	1–5	Away	1–3	Home	0–2
1967–68	Cup Winners' Cup	1/16	(Norway) Fredrikstad FK	6–3	Away	1–5	Home	2–1
1967–68	Cup Winners' Cup	1/8	(West Germany) Bayern Munich	3–7	Away	6–2	Home	1–1
1968–69	Inter-Cities Fairs Cup	1/32	(Northern Ireland) Linfield	6–1	Home	3–0	Away	1–3
1968–69	Inter-Cities Fairs Cup	1/16	(France) Olympique Lyon	7–1	Home	5–0	Away	1–2
1968–69	Inter-Cities Fairs Cup	1/8	(Italy) Fiorentina	4–2	Home	3–0	Away	2–1
1968–69	Inter-Cities Fairs Cup	1/4	(England) Newcastle United	4–6	Away	5–1	Home	3–1
1969–70	Inter-Cities Fairs Cup	1/32	(Romania) Rapid Bucharest	7–2	Home	3–1	Away	1–4
1969–70	Inter-Cities Fairs Cup	1/16	(England) Liverpool	3–3	Home	1–0	Away	3–2
1969–70	Inter-Cities Fairs Cup	1/8	(West Germany) Hertha Berlin	1–2	Home	1–1	Away	1–0
1970–71	Inter-Cities Fairs Cup	1/32	(Switzerland) Lausanne Sports	4–1	Away	0–2	Home	2–1
1970–71	Inter-Cities Fairs Cup	1/16	(Socialist Federal Republic of Yugoslavia) Hajduk Split	3–2	Home	2–0	Away	2–1
1970–71	Inter-Cities Fairs Cup	1/8	(Belgium) Anderlecht	4–3	Away	2–1	Home	3–1
1970–71	Inter-Cities Fairs Cup	1/4	(England) Leeds United	2–3	Away	2–1	Home	1–1
1971–72	UEFA Cup	1/32	(France) Nîmes Olympique	2–2	Home	1–0	Away	2–1
1971–72	UEFA Cup	1/16	(Soviet Union) FC Spartak Moscow	4–0	Away	0–0	Home	4–0
1971–72	UEFA Cup	1/8	(Romania) UTA Arad	1–3	Away	3–0	Home	1–0
1972–73	UEFA Cup	1/32	(Poland) Zagłębie Sosnowiec	6–2	Home	6–1	Away	1–0
1972–73	UEFA Cup	1/16	(Italy) Fiorentina	2–2	Home	1–0	Away	2–1
1972–73	UEFA Cup	1/8	(Italy) Internazionale	2–1	Home	2–0	Away	1–0
1972–73	UEFA Cup	1/4	(England) Tottenham Hotspur	2–2	Away	1–0	Home	2–1
1973–74	UEFA Cup	1/32	(Belgium) Beerschot	4–0	Home	2–0	Away	0–2
1973–74	UEFA Cup	1/16	(Belgium) RWD Molenbeek	2–2	Home	1–0	Away	2–1
1973–74	UEFA Cup	1/8	(England) Leeds United	3–2	Away	0–1	Home	2–2
1973–74	UEFA Cup	1/4	(West Germany) VfB Stuttgart	2–3	Away	1–0	Home	2–2
1974–75	UEFA Cup	1/32	(Spain) Real Zaragoza	1–5	Home	1–1	Away	0–4
1975–76	Intertoto Cup	GS	(Socialist Federal Republic of Yugoslavia) Čelik Zenica	2nd	Away	1–1	Home	1–2
1975–76	Intertoto Cup	GS	(Czechoslovakia) Baník Ostrava	2nd	Home	2–1	Away	0–1
1975–76	Intertoto Cup	GS	(Sweden) Elfsborg	2nd	Home	1–0	Away	1–1
1999–00	UEFA Cup	1/64	(Italy) Roma	1–7	Away	0–7	Home	1–0
2005–06	UEFA Cup	1st rd	(Italy) Sampdoria	1–2	Home	1–1	Away	0–1
2006–07	UEFA Cup	1st rd	(Netherlands) Heerenveen	0–3	Home	0–3	Away	0–0
2008–09	UEFA Cup	1st rd	(Netherlands) Heerenveen	3–6	Home	1–1	Away	2–5
