= Pedro da Conceição =

Portuguese footballer (died 1960)

Personal information
- Place of birth: Portugal
- Date of death: 10 April 1960
- Place of death: Portugal
- Position: Goalkeeper

Senior career*
Years	Team	Apps	(Gls)
1931–1936	Benfica	34	(0)
- * Club domestic league appearances and goals

Pedro da Conceição (died 10 April 1960) is a former Portuguese footballer who played as a goalkeeper.

He represented Benfica during the 1930s, winning a Lisbon Championship.

== Career ==
Conceição joined Benfica in 1931, making his debut on 10 January 1932, against União de Lisboa. He played all of the team games in 1931–32, but did not win any silverware. He remained an undisputed starter in 1932–33, playing 19 games as Benfica won the Campeonato de Lisboa. The next season, Conceição competed with Augusto Amaro, appearing in four games against his competitor eight. However, all of his games were in the Campeonato de Portugal, while Amaro played seven in the Campeonato de Lisboa.

In 1934–35, he definitely overtaken by Amaro in the pecking order, appearing only once throughout the season. After the breakthrough of Cândido Tavares in 1935–36, he only played in the regional league and left the club at the end of the season with 48 games played.

== Honours ==
Benfica

- Campeonato de Lisboa: 1932–33
