= Francisco Manteigueiro =

Portuguese footballer (1933–2011)

Personal information
- Full name: Francisco Pinto Manteigueiro
- Date of birth: 24 September 1933 (age 93)
- Place of birth: Covilhã, Portugal
- Date of death: 9 November 2011
- Place of death: Elvas, Portugal
- Position: Midfielder

Youth career
- Covilhã

Senior career*
| Years | Team | Apps | (Gls) |
| 1953–1971 | Covilhã | | |

Managerial career
- 1982: Covilhã
- * Club domestic league appearances and goals

Francisco Pinto Manteigueiro (24 September 1933 – 9 November 2011) was a Portuguese football player who played as a midfielder for Sporting da Covilhã.

Manteigueiro was part of the 1956–57 Sporting da Covilhã side who reached the 1957 Taça de Portugal final.

== See also ==
- List of one-club men
