= Soure, Portugal =

Soure
- Municipality
- Town of Soure
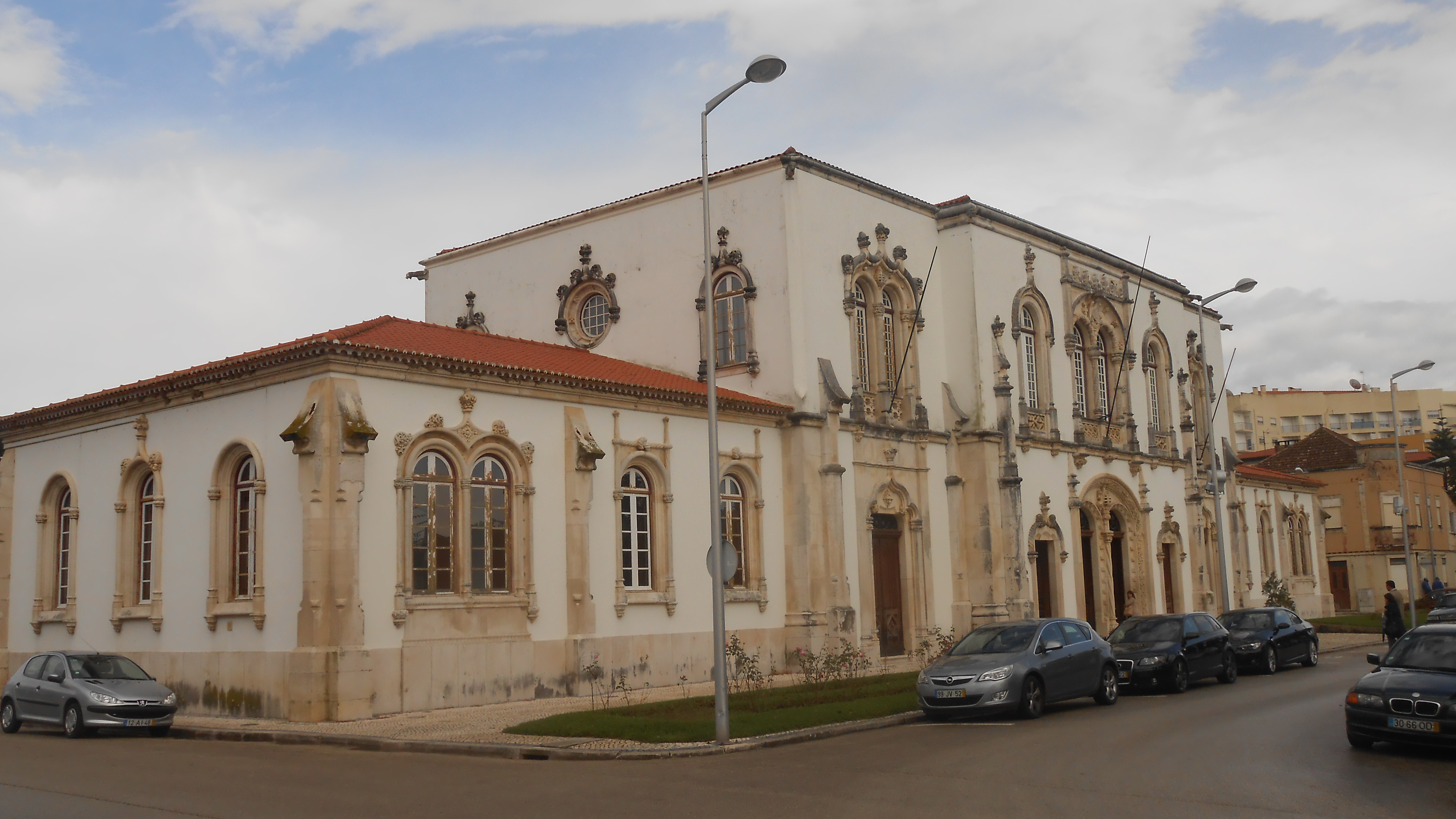
- Soure town hall

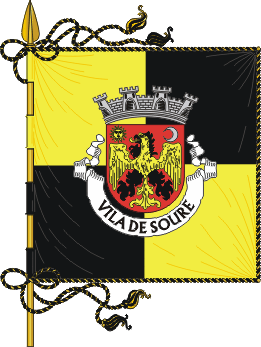
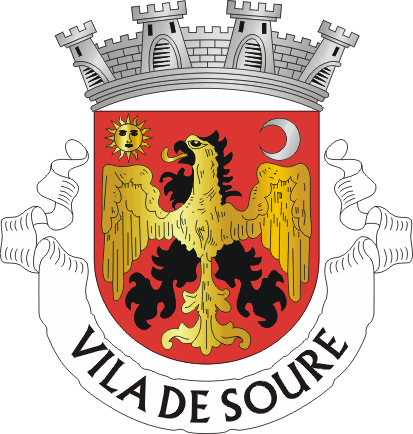
- Flag Coat of arms
- Interactive map of Soure
- Coordinates: 40°03′N 8°38′W
- Country: Portugal
- Region: Centro
- Intermunic. comm.: Região de Coimbra
- District: Coimbra
- Parishes: 10

Area
  - Total: 265.06 km^{2} (102.34 sq mi)
- Highest elevation: 531 m (1,742 ft)
- Lowest elevation: 6 m (20 ft)

Population (2011)
  - Total: 19,245
  - Density: 72.606/km^{2} (188.05/sq mi)
- Time zone: UTC+00:00 (WET)
  - Summer (DST): UTC+01:00 (WEST)

Soure (Portuguese pronunciation: [ˈsoɾɨ]), officially the Town of Soure (Portuguese: Vila de Soure), is a town and municipality of the Coimbra District, in Portugal. The population in 2011 was 19,245, in an area of 265.06 km². It includes a castle listed as a national monument.

The village of Paleão, located a few kilometers from the village of Soure, is one of the largest clusters of houses in the municipality, where the old cotton and linen factory is located.

In January 2026, Storm Kristin caused a catastrophic damage in the municipality of Soure.

== Parishes ==
Parishes of the Soure municipality

Administratively, the municipality is divided into 10 civil parishes (freguesias):

- Alfarelos
- Degracias e Pombalinho
- Figueiró do Campo
- Gesteira e Brunhós
- Granja do Ulmeiro
- Samuel
- Soure
- Tapeus
- Vila Nova de Anços
- Vinha da Rainha

Soure is one of the few territorially discontinuous municipalities in Portugal. The case of Soure is unique in the Portuguese context, as the discontinuity of the municipality is twofold and is due to the territorial discontinuity of two of its parishes: Degracias and Pombalinho, and Figueiró do Campo.

Degracias and Pombalinho parish has a small exclave embedded between the municipalities of Penela (in the district of Coimbra) and Ansião (in the district of Leiria).

Figueiró do Campo parish has an even smaller exclave, sandwiched between two parishes in the municipality of Montemor-o-Velho, effectively creating a small enclave in this municipality in the district of Coimbra.

== Geography ==
The municipality is bound to the north by the municipality of Montemor-o-Velho, to the northeast by Condeixa-a-Nova, to the east by Penela, to the southeast by Ansião, to the south by Pombal and to the west by Figueira da Foz.

=== Climate ===
Climate data for Soure
Month	Jan	Feb	Mar	Apr	May	Jun	Jul	Aug	Sep	Oct	Nov	Dec	Year
Average precipitation mm (inches)	125 (4.9)	107 (4.2)	88 (3.5)	70 (2.8)	65 (2.6)	29 (1.1)	8 (0.3)	11 (0.4)	39 (1.5)	87 (3.4)	112 (4.4)	120 (4.7)	861 (33.8)
Source: Portuguese Environment Agency

== Population ==
Number of inhabitants

Year	Pop.	±%
1864	17,641	—
1878	18,801	+6.6%
1890	18,616	−1.0%
1900	20,233	+8.7%
1911	22,570	+11.6%
1920	22,103	−2.1%

Year	Pop.	±%
1930	22,941	+3.8%
1940	25,108	+9.4%
1950	26,176	+4.3%
1960	26,575	+1.5%
1970	22,094	−16.9%
1981	22,570	+2.2%

Year	Pop.	±%
1991	21,704	−3.8%
2001	20,940	−3.5%
2011	19,245	−8.1%
2021	17,261	−10.3%

Note: The number of "resident" inhabitants is those who had their official residence in this municipality on the date the censuses were carried out.

According to data of National Institute of Statistics (INE), in 2021 the district of Coimbra recorded a population decrease of around 5.0% compared to the results of the 2011 census. In the municipality of Soure, the decrease was around 10.3%.

Number of inhabitants by Age Group
	1900	1911	1920	1930	1940	1950	1960	1970	1981	1991	2001	2011	2021
0-14 years	6 758	7 544	6 520	7 169	7 187	6 777	6 687	4 660	4 672	3 479	2 519	2 258	1 761
15-24 years	3 427	4 043	4 338	4 008	4 195	4 492	3 949	3 210	3 190	3 001	2 663	1 671	1 495
25-64 years	8 761	9 300	9 522	10 354	11 162	12 292	13 134	11 215	10 868	10 883	10 530	9 930	8 227
≥ 65 years	1 198	1 419	1 374	1 852	2 059	2 276	2 805	2 940	3 840	4 341	5 228	5 386	5 778

(Note: From 1900 to 1950, the data refer to the "de facto" population, that is, those who were present in the municipality at the time the censuses were carried out. Hence, there are some differences in relation to the designated resident population)

== Transport ==
=== Railway ===
Linha do Norte (Northern Line) has four stations in the Soure municipality (from south to north):

- Simoes
- Soure
- Vila Nova de Anços
- Alfarelos (also known as Alfarelos - Granja do Ulmeiro)

According to 2023 data, Soure station is served by C.P. regional passenger trains, typically with eleven trains per day in the Coimbra direction and twelve in the Entroncamento direction.

Alfarelos railway station, originally called Alfarellos, is a railway station located in the parish of Granja do Ulmeiro. As a junction point for the Alfarelos branch on the Northern Line, it is an important station for rail service connections between Coimbra, Figueira da Foz, Porto, and Lisbon. As of 2023, Alfarelos is served by several types of C.P. passenger trains:

- Commuter train on the Coimbra-Figueira service, typically with 16 trains per day in each direction, some with extended stops (4-8 min.) at this station;
- Regional train, between Coimbra and Lisbon - Santa Apolónia or Entroncamento, typically with 13 daily circulations in each direction.
- Inter-regional train, between Coimbra-B and Caldas da Rainha, typically with two trains per week in each direction.

Montemor railway station, which is on the Alfarelos branch and nominally serves the town of Montemor-o-Velho (3.7 km away), is located in the Alfarelos parish. It is served by Coimbra-Figueira commuter trains infrequently.

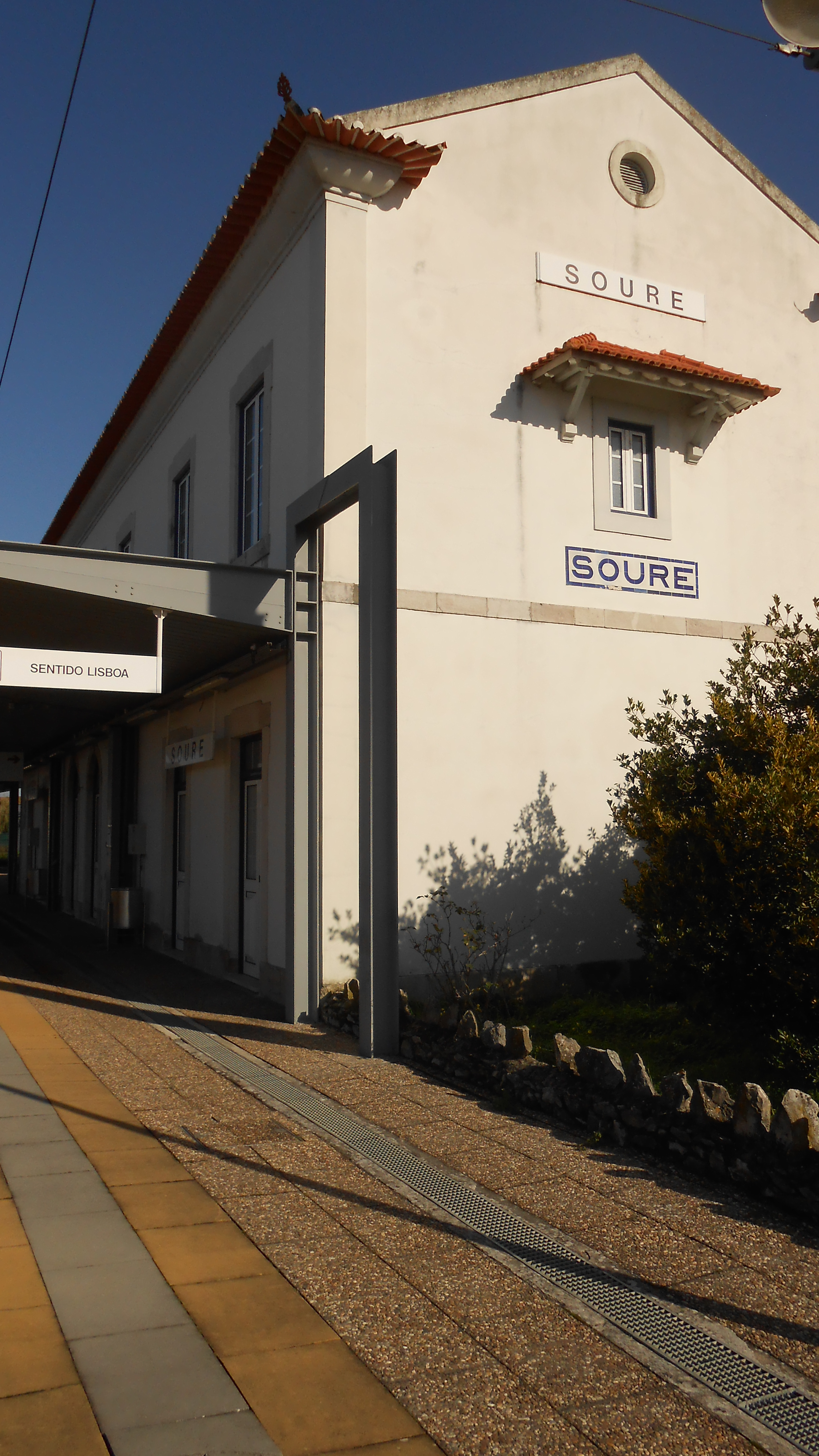
South facade of Soure station, in 2015

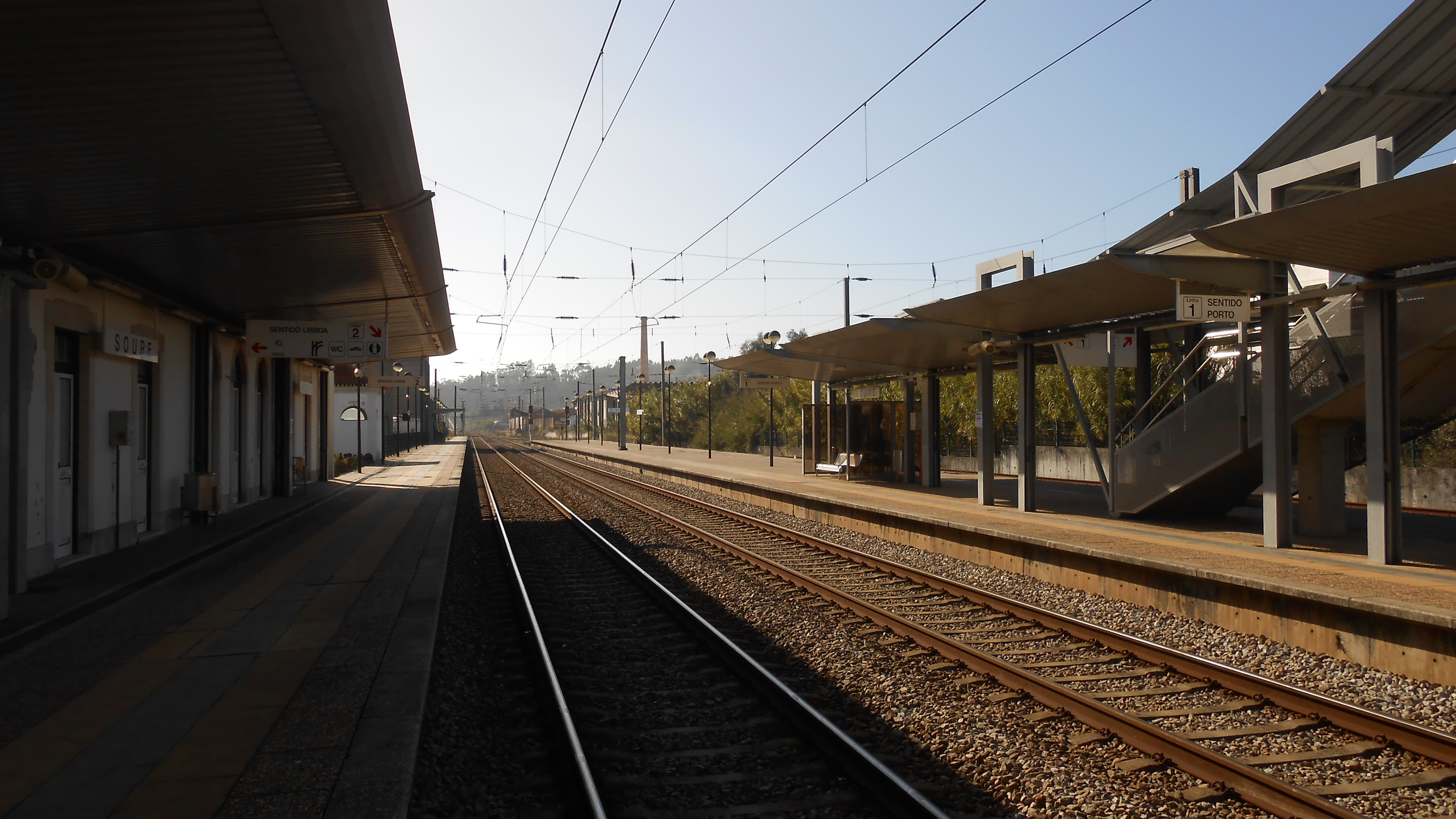
Tracks and platforms at Soure station, in 2015

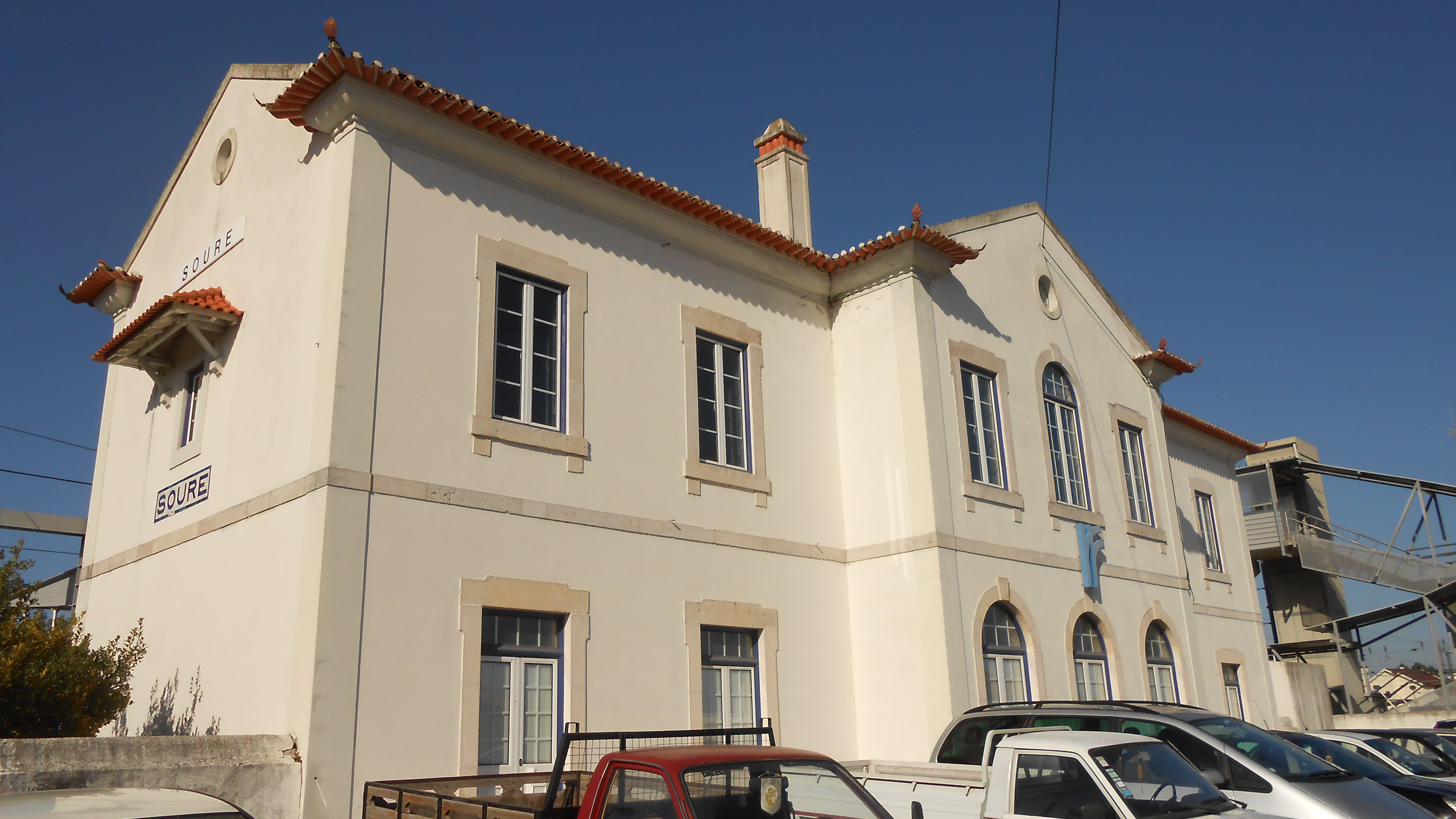
Soure station building, as seen from the street, in 2015

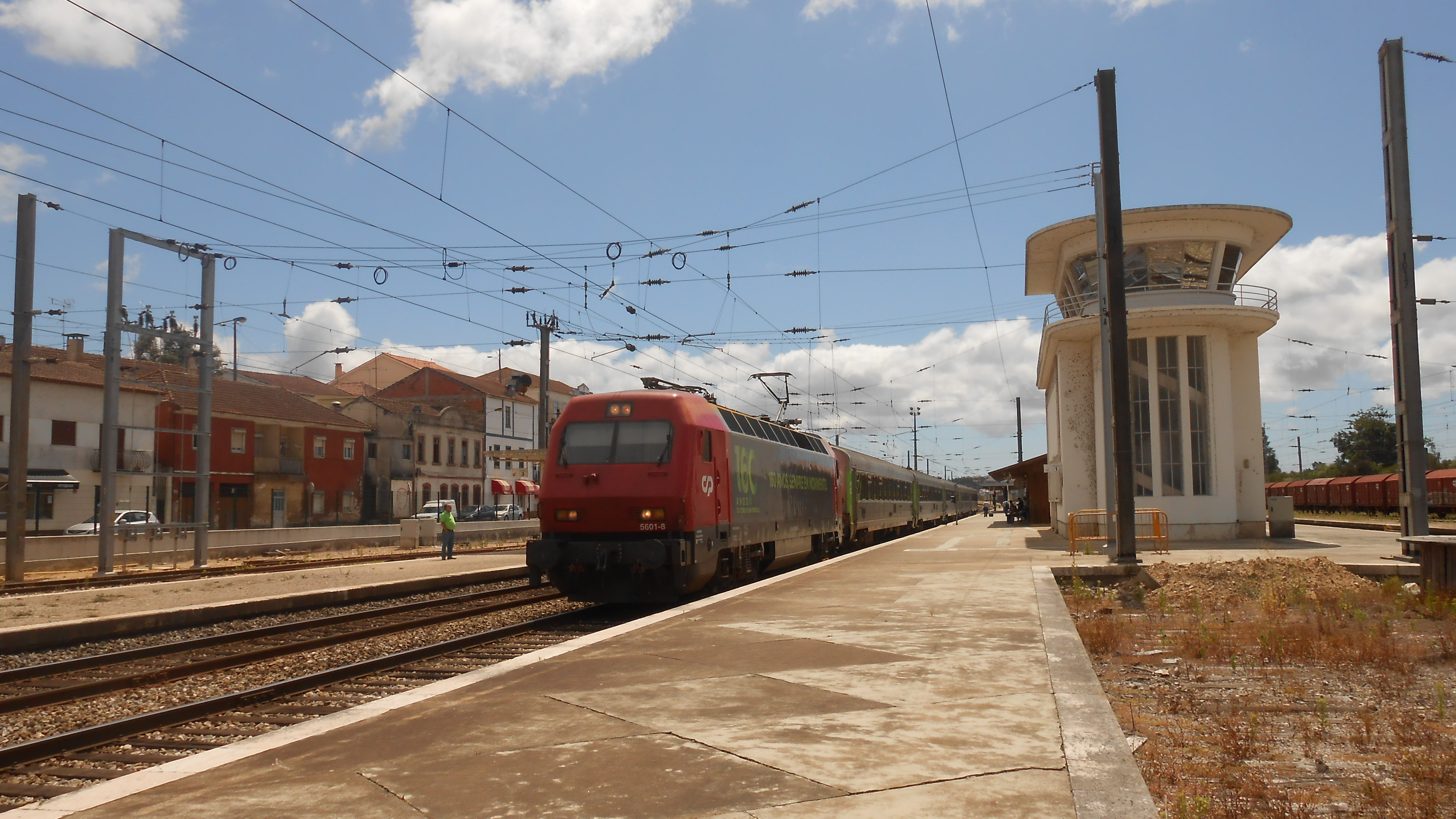
Tracks and platforms at Alfarelos station, in 2017

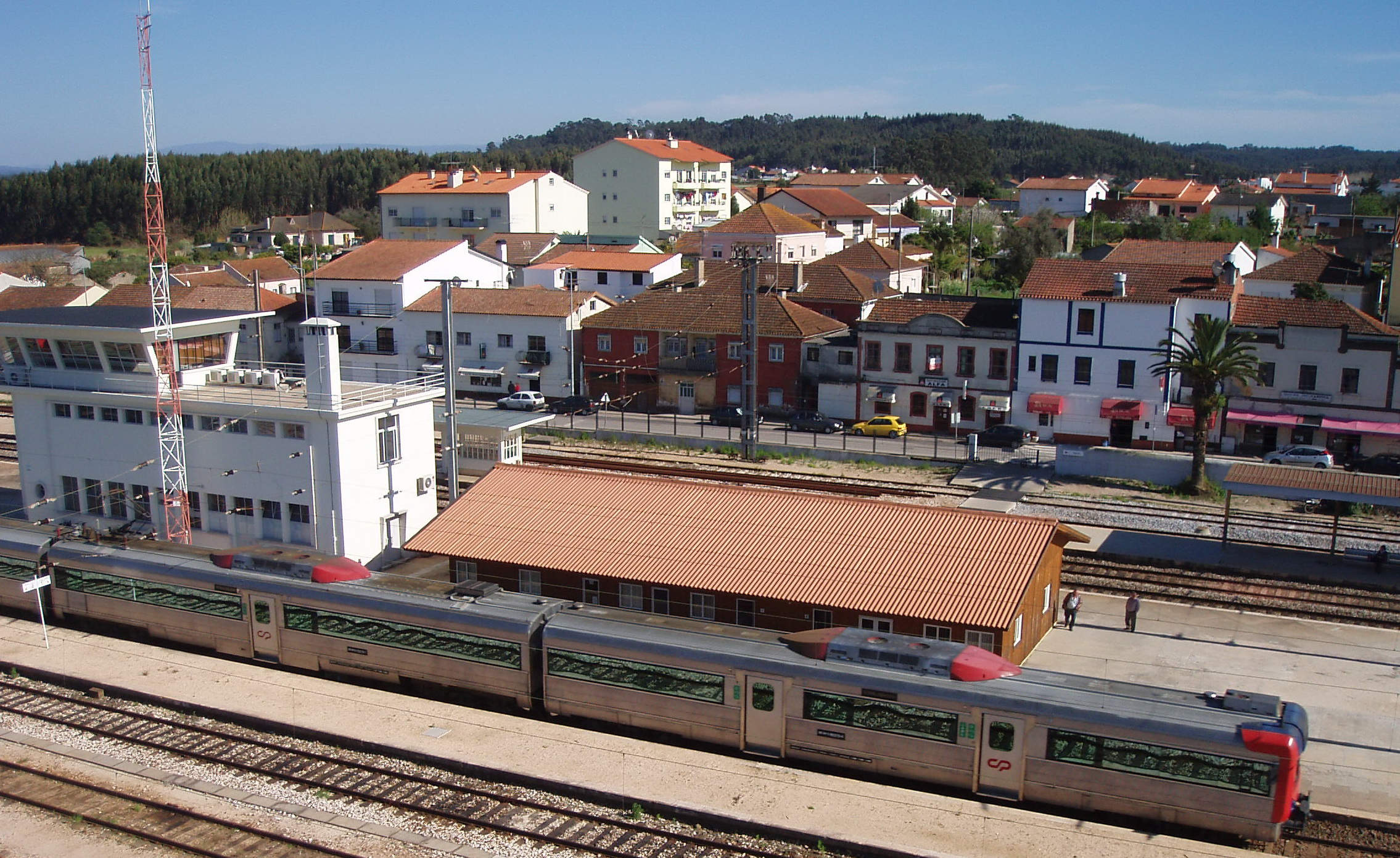
Alfarelos station and the Granja do Ulmeiro village next to the station

=== Road ===
A1 motorway passes through Soure municipality and has one exit located southeast of the Paleão village.

Number of the exit	Km from Lisbon; Porto	Exit road
10A	169; 134	N 348

== Religious sites ==
There are several Roman Catholic churches in the Soure municipality.

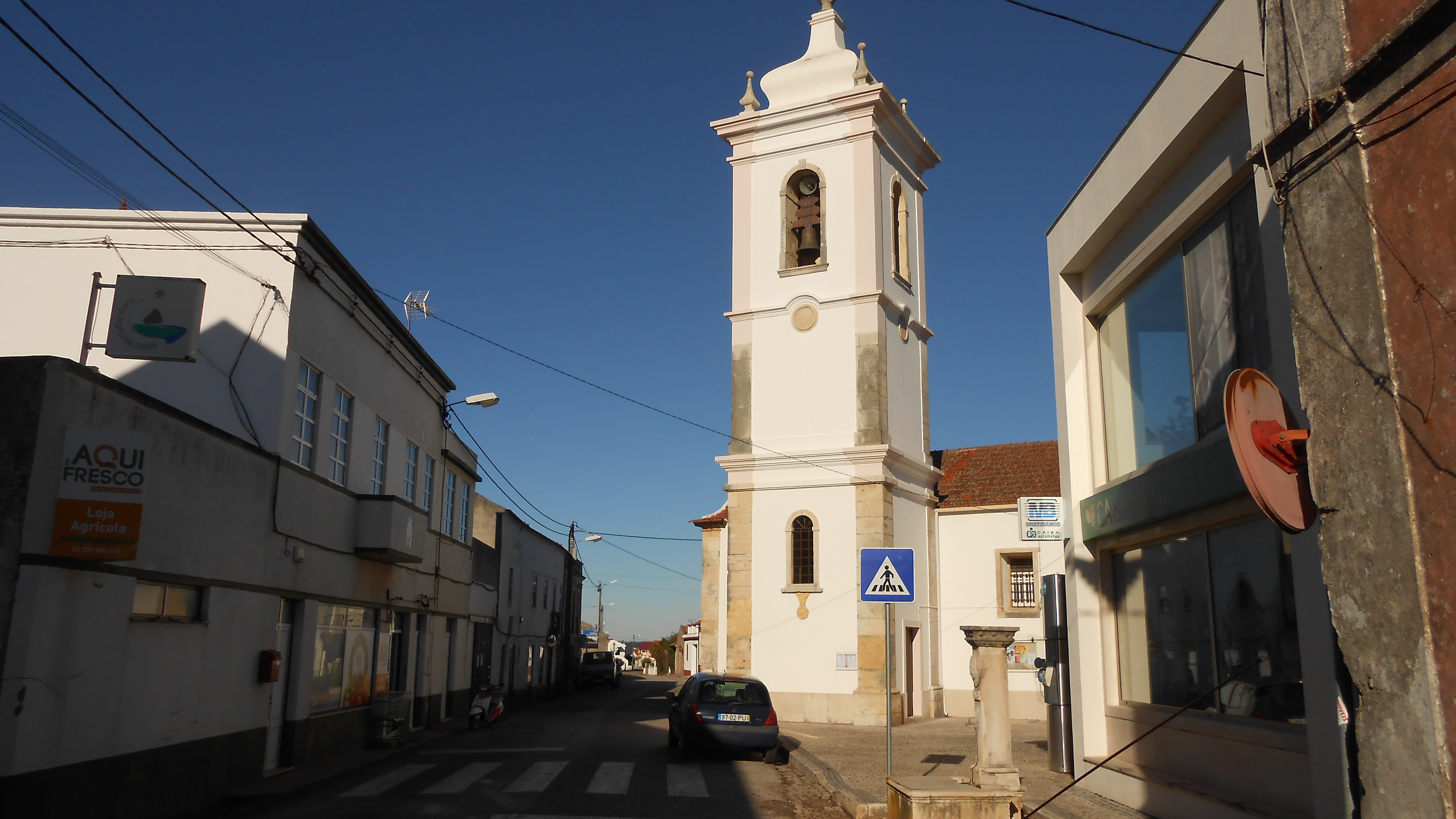
Church of Our Lady of Grace in Vinha da Rainha parish

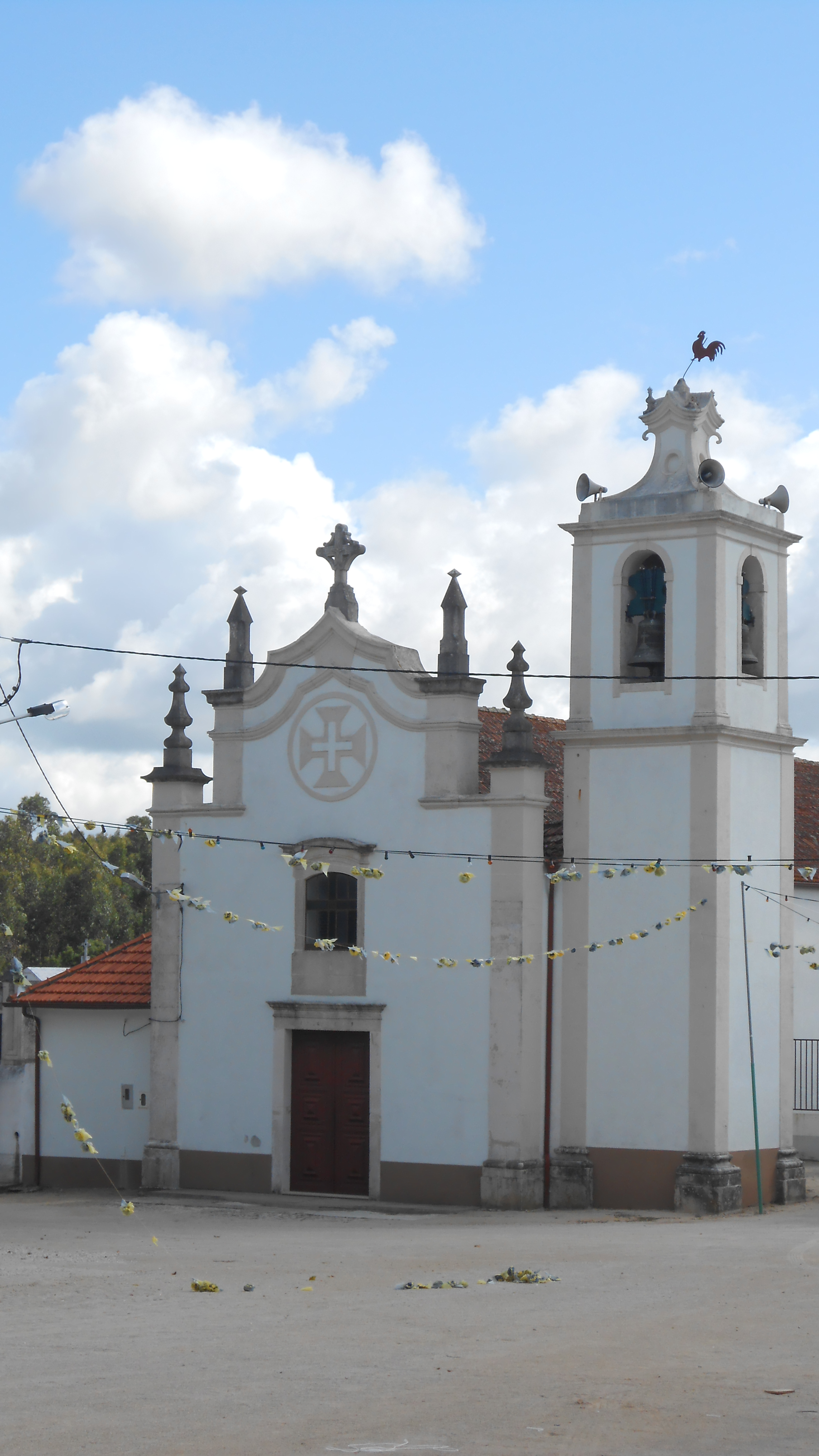
The parish church of Samuel parish. The Church of Nossa Senhora da Purificação is also known for the image of the devil inside.

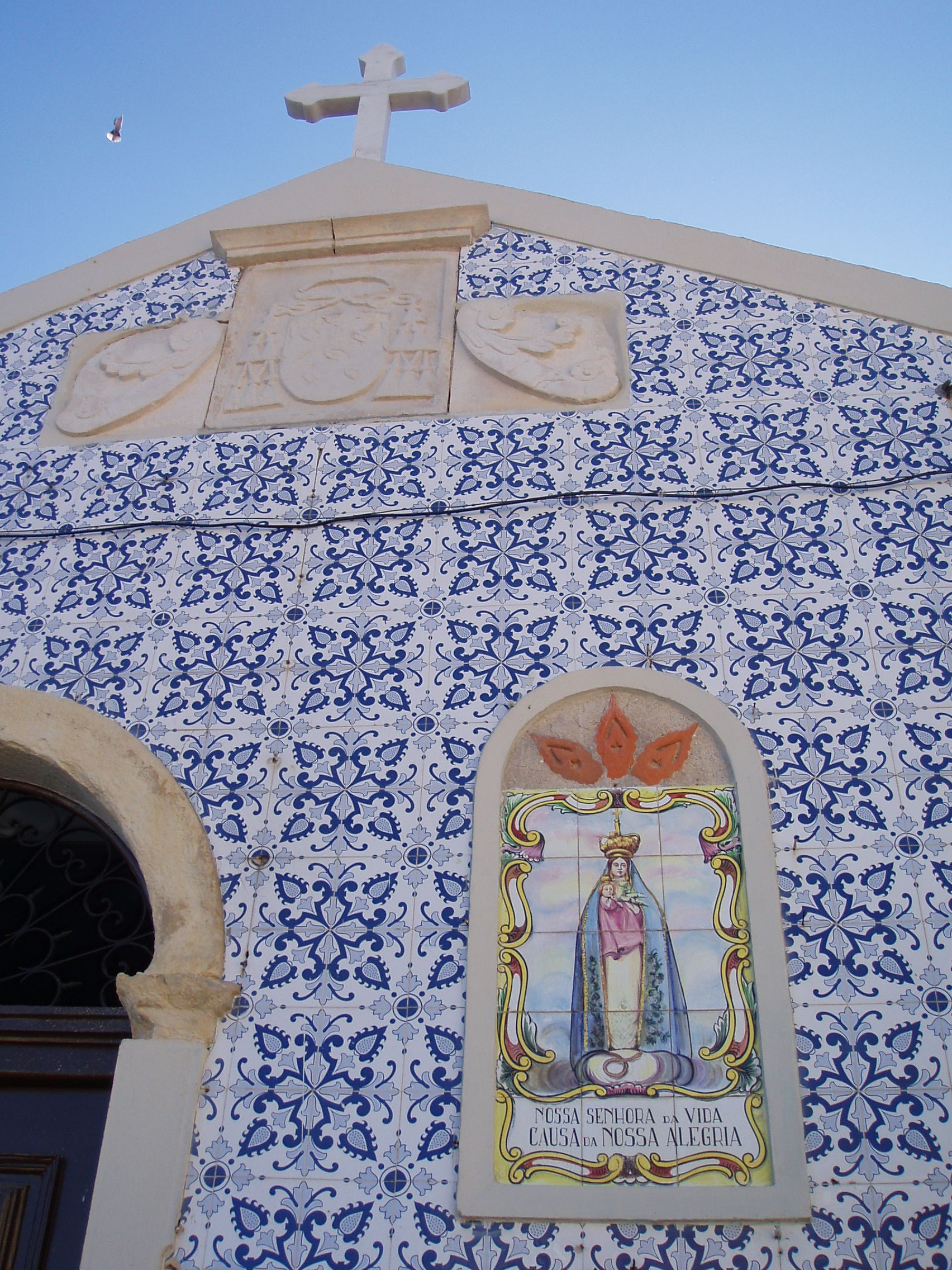
Chapel of Our Lady of Life in Granja do Ulmeiro parish

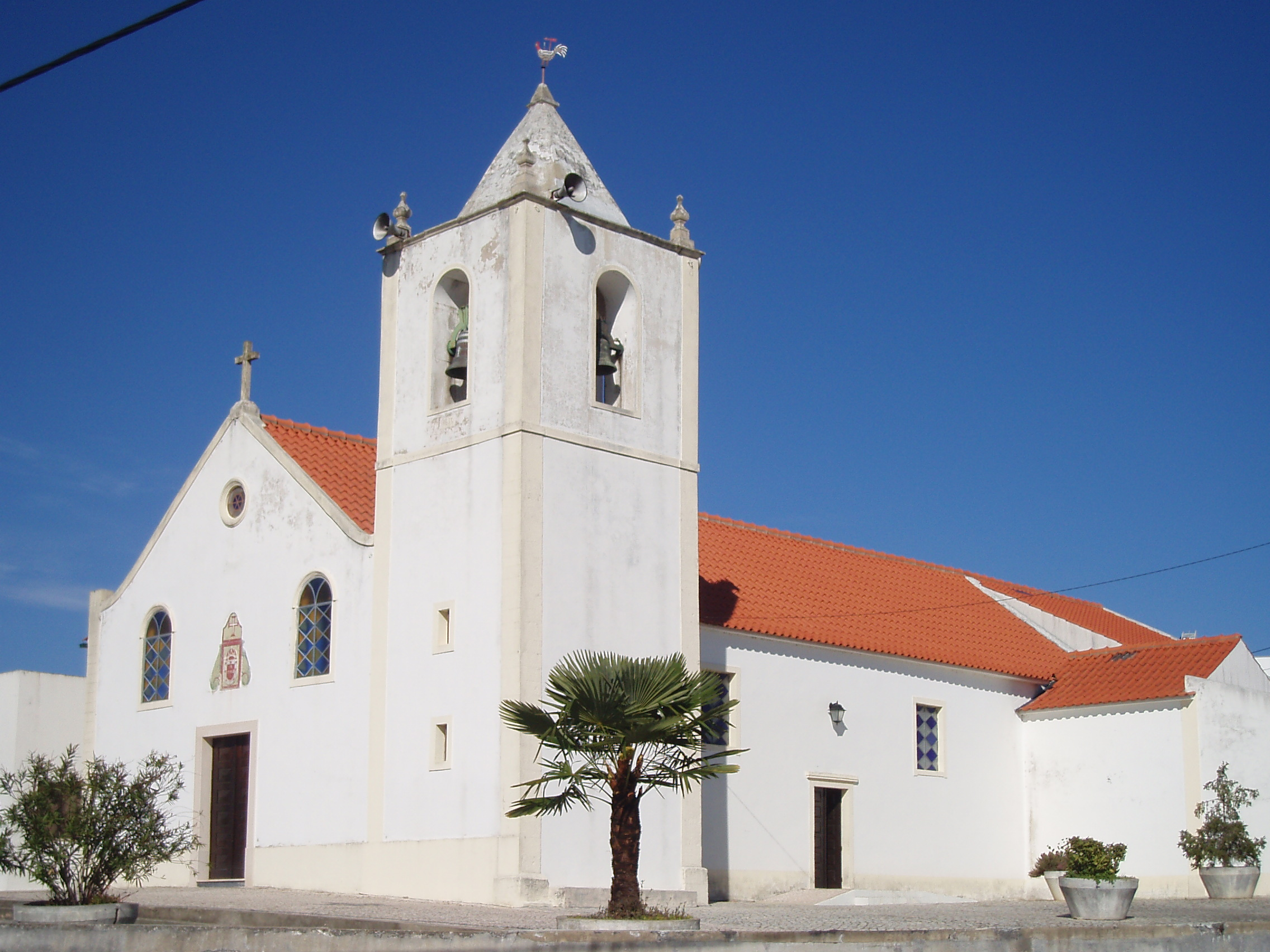
Main Church of Granja do Ulmeiro
