= Cândido Tavares =

Portuguese footballer and manager

Personal information
- Full name: Cândido Coelho Tavares
- Date of birth: 30 December 1911
- Place of birth: Seixal, Portugal
- Date of death: 18 June 1997 (aged 85)
- Place of death: Seixal, Portugal
- Position: Goalkeeper

Senior career*
Years	Team	Apps	(Gls)
1931	Casa Pia		
1932–1934	Lusitano Evóra		
1934–1935	Casa Pia		
1935–1937	Benfica	24	(0)
1938–1939	Casa Pia		
1941–1942	União Sportiva		

Managerial career
- 1951–1952: Benfica
- 1952–1954: Vitória Guimarães
- 1954–1955: Lusitano Evóra
- 1956: Torreense
- 1957–1958: Fabril
- * Club domestic league appearances and goals

Cândido Coelho Tavares (30 December 1911 – 18 June 1997) was a Portuguese football goalkeeper and manager.

With a career spanning over a decade, Tavares represented mainly Casa Pia and Benfica, coaching the latter afterwards and winning a Portuguese Cup.

== Playing career ==
Born in Seixal, Setúbal District, Tavares started playing with Casa Pia A.C. in 1931 and moved to Lusitano G.C. the following year. In 1935 he returned to his previous club, subsequently signing with S.L. Benfica.

At the latter side, Tavares eventually beat competition from Augusto Amaro and Pedro Conceição position, playing all of the league games in his first season, and interchanging with Amaro in his second year. He then had a third spell at Casa Pia, retiring in 1942 at the age of 31 with União Sportiva in Azores.

== Coaching career ==
After retiring, Tavares started working as a fitness coach, having his first experience as manager in December 1951 at Benfica, when Ted Smith left unexpectedly. He was still able to guide them to a Taça de Portugal triumph against Sporting Clube de Portugal on 15 June 1952 and, the next year, was appointed at Vitória de Guimarães, which he led to two consecutive eighth-place finishes in the Primeira Liga.

Subsequently, Tavares managed Lusitano de Évora, S.C.U. Torreense and G.D. Fabril, always in the top flight. He also had a small stint in the Portugal national team as fitness coach, in 1956.

== Managerial statistics ==
Team	From	To	Record				
Team	From	To	G	W	D	L	Win %
Benfica	9 December 1951	15 June 1952	17	13	1	3	76.47

== Honours ==
- Taça de Portugal: 1951–52
