= Alfarelos =

- Civil parish
- Location in Portugal
- Coordinates: 40.150°N 8.653°W
- Country: Portugal
- Region: Centro
- Intermunic. comm.: Região de Coimbra
- District: Coimbra
- Municipality: Soure

Area
  - Total: 13.98 km^{2} (5.40 sq mi)

Population (2011)
  - Total: 1,439
  - Density: 100/km^{2} (270/sq mi)
- Time zone: UTC+00:00 (WET)
  - Summer (DST): UTC+01:00 (WEST)

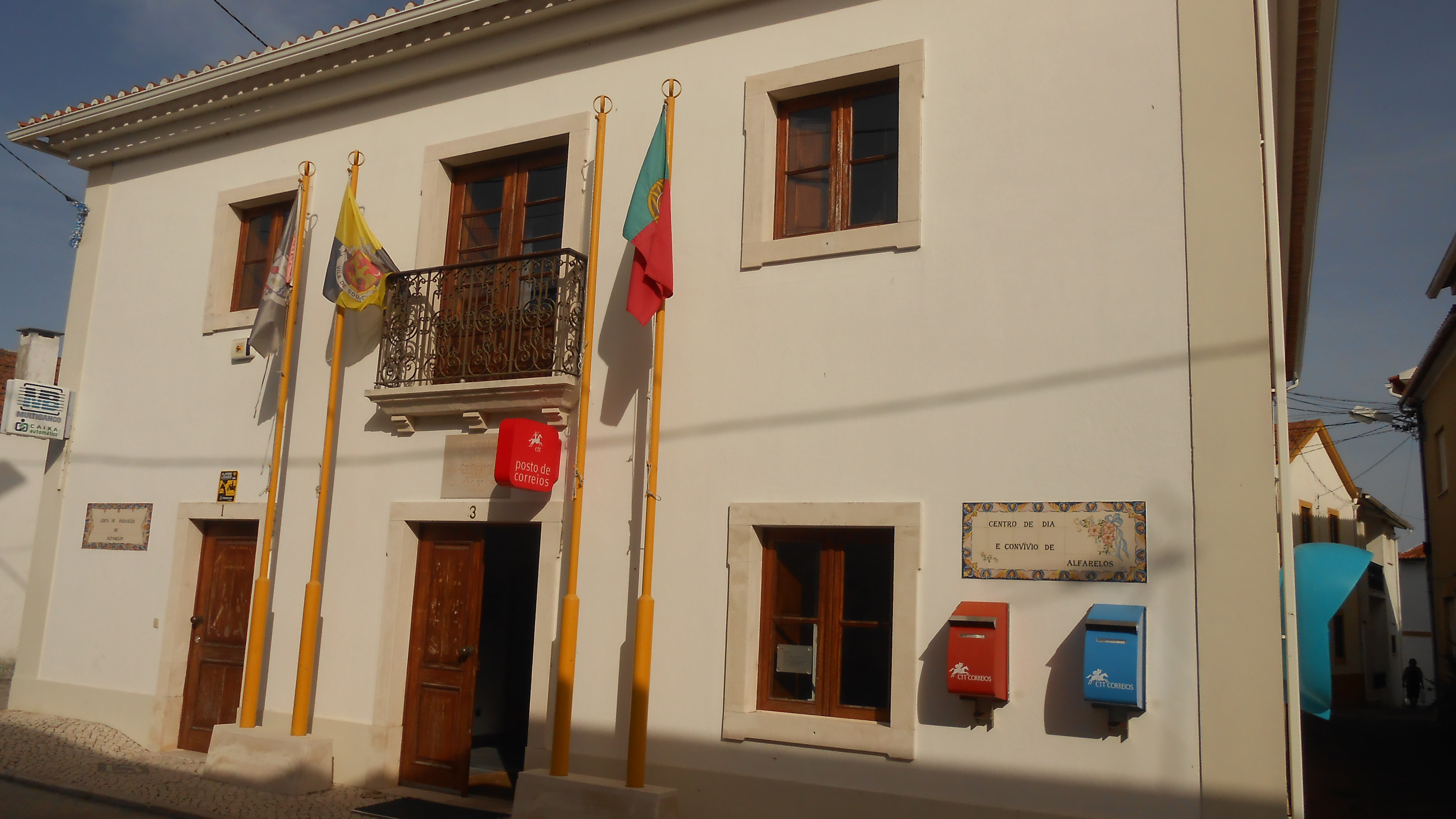
Parish council in Alfarelos

Alfarelos is a civil parish in the municipality of Soure, Portugal. The population in 2011 was 1,439, in an area of 13.98 km².
