= Rogério Contreiras =

Portuguese footballer (1922–1990)

Personal information
- Full name: Rogério Contreiras Simão
- Date of birth: 25 December 1922
- Place of birth: Castro Verde, Portugal
- Date of death: 13 March 1990 (aged 67)
- Place of death: Barreiro, Portugal
- Position: Goalkeeper

Senior career*
Years	Team	Apps	(Gls)
1940–1942	Barreirense		
1942–1945	Fósforos		
1945–1947	Vianense		
1947–1950	Benfica	34	(0)
1950–1958	Juventude de Évora		
- * Club domestic league appearances and goals

Rogério Contreiras Simões (25 December 1922 – 13 March 1990) was a Portuguese footballer who played as a goalkeeper.

He played for several clubs, but was most known for his short three-year spell at Benfica, where he won two honours, one league and one Portuguese Cup.

== Career ==
Born in Castro Verde, Contreiras started at Barreirense in 1940. He then spent three years at GD Fósforos, followed by two at Vianense. He arrived at Benfica in 1947 to battle with Pinto Machado, following the retirement of Martins. He made his debut on 16 November against Braga, and was used in 19 league matches, with Benfica finishing level on points with Sporting.

In 1948–49, he made the same number of league appearances as Pinto Machado, but was the starting goalkeeper in the 1949 Taça de Portugal Final, when Benfica beat Atlético by 2–1. In his third and final year with Benfica, he only made two league appearances, as Mário da Rosa overtook in the picking order. Nonetheless, the two appearances were enough for him to win his first league title. After Benfica, he represented Juventude de Évora for several seasons, and died on 13 March 1990, at age 67.

== Honours ==
Benfica

- Primeira Divisão: 1949–50
- Taça de Portugal: 1948–49
