= António Manuel =

Portuguese footballer

Personal information
- Full name: António Manuel Alves Bernardes
- Date of birth: 7 December 1929 (age 96)
- Place of birth: Torres Vedras, Portugal
- Position: Half-back

Senior career*
Years	Team	Apps	(Gls)
1948–1954	Benfica	26	(0)
1954–1959	Torreense	45	(0)
Total		71	(0)
- * Club domestic league appearances and goals

António Manuel Alves Bernardes (born 7 December 1929) is a retired Portuguese footballer who played as a half-back.

== Career ==
António Manuel arrived at Benfica in 1948, but only made his debut on 2 January 1949, when Ted Smith started him against Belenenses. It was his only appearance all season. He did not compete for the first team in 1949–50, but played six league matches in 1950–51. The following year, his playing time was once again cut short, as he only played one game, an away win to Boavista on 30 March 1952. However, his next two seasons, were more productive, as he played 9 league games in each.

António Manuel left the club in 1954 without any silverware, since he never played in any of the club conquests during his time there. He continued his career at Torreense, helping them get promoted from the Portuguese Second Division in 1954–55.
