= Arthur John (football manager) =

English football manager (1898–1972)

Artur John
Personal information
- Date of birth: 1898
- Place of birth: England
- Date of death: 31 March 1972 (aged 74)
- Place of death: Lisbon, Portugal

Managerial career
- Years: Team
- 1923–1929: Vitória Setúbal
- 1929–1931: Benfica
- 1931–1933: Sporting CP

Arthur "Artur" John (1898 – 31 March 1972) was an English football manager who managed Vitória de Setúbal, Benfica and Sporting CP in Portugal.

He was an unusual manager because he acted as a massage therapist and massaged his players when they approached the bench for instructions. He was convinced that the player-manager role should not exist, saying, "You either coach or play".

== Career ==
Born in England, John career as manager started in Vitória de Setúbal, managing them for six seasons, winning two Campeonato de Lisboa, two newly created Campeonato de Setúbal and finish runners-up in the 1926–27 Campeonato de Portugal.

That success led him to bigger clubs, so in 1929, John became the first foreign manager of Benfica. In his two seasons he spent there, John led the club to their first national title, winning the Campeonato de Portugal against Barreirense on 1 June 1930, putting an end to a 10-year title drought He successfully defend this conquest in the following year, beating Porto by three-nill on 28 June 1931.

John was then signed by Sporting CP, which offered him 16 contos to move. He did not have as much success there, and was replaced in May 1933 by Rudolf Jeny. He was the last manager to directly move from Benfica to Sporting until Jorge Jesus did it 84 years later. He died in Lisbon on 31 March 1972, at age 74, and was buried in Cemetery of Ajuda.

== Managerial statistics ==
Team	From	To	Record				
Team	From	To	G	W	D	L	Win %
Benfica	20 October 1929	28 June 1931	46	28	6	12	60.87
Sporting	13 December 1931	17 May 1933	35	22	4	9	62.86

== Honours ==
Vitória Setúbal

- Campeonato de Lisboa: 1923–24, 1926–27
- Campeonato de Setúbal: 1927–28, 1928–29

Benfica

- Campeonato de Portugal: 1929–30, 1930–31
