= Leonel Pegado =

Portuguese footballer (1931–2010)

Pegado
Personal information
- Full name: Leonel Vasco Oliveira Pegado
- Date of birth: 26 January 1931
- Place of birth: Portuguese Mozambique
- Date of death: 22 July 2010 (aged 79)
- Position: Half-back

Senior career*
Years	Team	Apps	(Gls)
1954–1958	Benfica	41	(3)
Total		41	(3)
- * Club domestic league appearances and goals

Leonel Vasco Oliveira Pegado (26 January 1931 – 22 July 2010), simply known as Pegado, was a Mozambican-Portuguese footballer who played as a half-back.

== Career ==
Born in Mozambique, Pegado joined Benfica in 1954 and made his debut on 13 February 1955, against CUF. He faced strong competition from Alfredo Abrantes, Francisco Palmeiro and Mário Coluna, so that game was his sole appearance in a league-winning campaign of 1954–55.

After another season in the background; in 1956–57 he assumed a starting role alongside Serra and Alfredo Abrantes, playing 27 matches and scoring five times, winning his second league title. Pegado remained an important player in the following year, making 24 appearances in all competitions, in what was his last season at Benfica.

== Honours ==
Benfica

- Primeira Liga:1954–55, 1956–57
