= Eduardo Cerqueira =

Portuguese footballer

Cerqueira
Personal information
- Full name: Eduardo Cerqueira
- Date of birth: 31 March 1921
- Place of birth: Lisbon, Portugal
- Position: Full back

Senior career*
Years	Team	Apps	(Gls)
1937–1938	SC Sacavém		
1938–1941	GD “Os Fósforos"		
1941–1942	SL Monte Pedral		
1942–1949	Benfica	48	(0)
1949–1956	Vitória de Guimarães	129	(0)
- * Club domestic league appearances and goals

Eduardo Cerqueira (born 31 March 1921) was a Portuguese footballer who played as a full back.

He was most known for representing Benfica during the 1940s and Vitória de Guimarães in the following decade. He won the Primeira Divisão with Benfica in 1944–45.

== Career ==
Born in Lisbon, Cerqueira career started in 1937 at SC Sacavém. A year later, he moved to GD “Os Fósforos", where he stayed for three years, until he joined Sport Lisboa e Monte Pedral in 1941. After only one season there, János Biri took him to Benfica. He made his debut for Benfica on 6 February 1944, against Salgueiros. The following year, Cerqueira joined Gaspar Pinto in the center of the defence and played 21 games on the way to his first Primeira Divisão title. Despite remaining in the starting eleven, the partnership with Artur Teixeira in 1945–46 was an unsuccessful one, as Benfica failed to win any silverware.

In 1946–47, Félix and Fernandes displaced him and Artur out of the first team, and he saw his playing time drop to one game. However, in 1947–48, Cerqueira made a comeback, battling with Fernandes and Jacinto for a place in the starting eleven, playing 12 games, all in the Primeira Divisão. In 1948-49, in what would be his last season at Benfica, he played one game, losing the competition to Fernandes, Félix and Jacinto. Afterwards, Cerqueira moved to Vitória de Guimarães where he reunited with Janos Biri, becoming an important played in the "Vitorianos", representing them in 130 games.

== Honours ==
Benfica

- Primeira Divisão: 1944–45
