= Pinto Machado =

Portuguese footballer

Personal information
- Full name: Henrique Pinto Machado
- Date of birth: 12 February 1926
- Place of birth: Alfarelos, Portugal
- Date of death: 21 January 2009 (aged 82)
- Place of death: Figueira da Foz, Portugal
- Position: Goalkeeper

Senior career*
Years	Team	Apps	(Gls)
1946–1949	Benfica	24	(0)
1949–1951	Naval		
- * Club domestic league appearances and goals

Henrique Pinto Machado (12 February 1926 – 21 January 2009) was a former Portuguese footballer who played as a goalkeeper.

He was most known for his short three-year spell at Benfica, where he won the Portuguese Cup.

== Career ==
Born in Alfarelos, Pinto Machado joined Benfica in 1946, making his debut on 24 November in a match against Porto. He battled with Martins for the goalkeeper position, playing the majority of his 14 appearances in the Campeonato de Lisboa. In his second season, the newly arrived Rogério Contreiras quickly overtook him in the pecking order, and Machado only played 11 games.

In his last year at Benfica, he split the league appearances evenly with Contreiras, with each making 13. Nonetheless, his single game in the Taça de Portugal on 8 May 1949, against Marítimo, was enough for him to gain honours for winning the cup. He left Benfica to represent Naval for two seasons, moving to Mozambique afterwards.

== Honours ==
Benfica

- Taça de Portugal: 1948–49
