= Artur Teixeira =

Portuguese footballer

Personal information
- Full name: Artur Ferreira Teixeira
- Place of birth: Portugal
- Position: Full back

Senior career*
Years	Team	Apps	(Gls)
1943–1947	Benfica	25	(0)
- * Club domestic league appearances and goals

Artur Ferreira Teixeira is a Portuguese footballer who played as a full back.

== Career ==
Silva arrived at Benfica in 1943, making his debut at the hands of Janos Biri on 6 February 1944, against Salgueiros. It was his only appearance in 1943–44. After playing only once in 1944–45 for the second time, he finally had his breakthrough season in 1945–46, amassing 25 games alongside Cerqueira, as he gain his place in the starting eleven in exchange for an aged Gaspar Pinto.

In 1946–47, Félix and Fernandes displaced him and Cerqueira out of the first team, and Teixeira saw his appearances drop to 18, nine in the league and nine in the Lisbon Championship. He left the club in 1947, having played 45 games in four years.

== Honours ==
Benfica

- Primeira Divisão: 1944–45
