= Avelino Martins =

Portuguese footballer

Personal information
- Full name: Avelino da Silva Martins
- Date of birth: 11 May 1905
- Place of birth: Portugal
- Date of death: Deceased
- Position: Central defender

Senior career*
Years	Team	Apps	(Gls)
1929–1935	FC Porto		

International career
1930–1934	Portugal	8	(0)
- * Club domestic league appearances and goals

Avelino da Silva Martins (born 11 May 1905, date of death unknown) was a Portuguese footballer who played as central defender.

== Football career ==
Martins gained 8 caps for Portugal and made his debut 8 June 1930 in Antwerp against Belgium, in a 1–2 defeat.
