= 2010–11 in Portuguese football =

This article is about the 2010–11 season in Portuguese football.

== Portuguese Clubs' Performance in Europe ==
=== Team results ===
Team	Competition	Result	Coach	Top scorer
Porto	Europa League	Winner	André Villas-Boas	Radamel Falcao
Braga	Europa League	Runner-up	Domingos Paciência	Alan
Benfica	Europa League	Semi-finals	Jorge Jesus	Óscar Cardozo

=== UEFA ranking ===
Team	Ranking		Points	
Team	Start of the Season	End of the Season	Start of the Season	End of the Season
Porto	15th	8th	76.659	100.319
SL Benfica	17th	17th	72.659	81.319
Sporting CP	28th	25th	57.659	68.319
Braga	48th	28th	39.659	62.319
Marítimo	-	138th	-	11.819
Portugal	9th	6th	38.296	51.596

=== Earnings ===
Team	Competition	Group Stage	Market-Pool	Knockout phase	Total
Braga	Champions League	€9,600,000	€2,242,000	-	€16,370,191
Braga	Europa League	-	€928,191	€3,600,000	€16,370,191
Benfica	Champions League	€8,800,000	€3,034,000	-	€13,762,191
Benfica	Europa League	-	€328,191	€1,600,000	€13,762,191

=== Results ===
Team	Contest and round		Opponent	1st leg score*	2nd leg score**	Aggregate score
Team	Competition	Round	Opponent	1st leg score*	2nd leg score**	Aggregate score
Porto	Europa League	Play-off round	(Belgium) Genk	3–0	4–2	7–2
Porto	Europa League	Group stage	(Austria) Rapid Wien	3–0	3–1	None
Porto	Europa League	Group stage	(Bulgaria) CSKA Sofia	1–0	3–1	None
Porto	Europa League	Group stage	(Turkey) Beşiktaş	3–1	1–1	None
Porto	Europa League	Round of 32	(Spain) Sevilla	2–1	0–1	2–2 (a)
Porto	Europa League	Round of 16	(Russia) CSKA Moscow	1–0	2–1	3–1
Porto	Europa League	Quarter-finals	(Russia) Spartak Moscow	5–1	5–2	10–3
Porto	Europa League	Semi-finals	(Spain) Villarreal	5–1	2–3	7–4
Porto	Europa League	Final	(Portugal) Braga	1–0		None
Benfica	Champions League	Group stage	(Israel) Hapoel Tel Aviv	2–0	0–3	None
Benfica	Champions League	Group stage	(Germany) Schalke 04	0–2	1–2	None
Benfica	Champions League	Group stage	(France) Lyon	0–2	4–3	None
Benfica	Europa League	Round of 32	(Germany) Stuttgart	2–1	2–0	4–1
Benfica	Europa League	Round of 16	(France) Paris Saint-Germain	2–1	1–1	3–1
Benfica	Europa League	Quarter-finals	(Netherlands) PSV Eindhoven	4–1	2–2	6–3
Benfica	Europa League	Semi-finals	(Portugal) Braga	2–1	0–1	2–2 (a)
Sporting CP	Europa League	3rd qual. round	(Denmark) Nordsjælland	1–0	2–1	3–1
Sporting CP	Europa League	Play-off round	(Denmark) Brøndby	0–2	3–0	3–2
Sporting CP	Europa League	Group stage	(France) Lille	2–1	1–0	None
Sporting CP	Europa League	Group stage	(Bulgaria) Levski Sofia	5–0	0–1	None
Sporting CP	Europa League	Group stage	(Belgium) Gent	5–1	1–3	None
Sporting CP	Europa League	Round of 32	(Scotland) Rangers	1–1	2–2	3–3 (a)
Braga	Champions League	3rd qual. round	(Scotland) Celtic	3–0	1–2	4–2
Braga	Champions League	Play-off round	(Spain) Sevilla	1–0	4–3	5–3
Braga	Champions League	Group stage	(England) Arsenal	0–6	2–0	None
Braga	Champions League	Group stage	(Ukraine) Shakhtar Donetsk	0–3	0–2	None
Braga	Champions League	Group stage	(Serbia) Partizan	2–0	1–0	None
Braga	Europa League	Round of 32	(Poland) Lech Poznań	0–1	2–0	2–1
Braga	Europa League	Round of 16	(England) Liverpool	1–0	2–0	1–0
Braga	Europa League	Quarter-finals	(Ukraine) Dynamo Kyiv	1–1	0–0	1–1 (a)
Braga	Europa League	Semi-finals	(Portugal) Benfica	2–1	0–1	2–2 (a)
Braga	Europa League	Final	(Portugal) Porto	0–1		None
Marítimo	Europa League	2nd qual. round	(Republic of Ireland) Sporting Fingal	3–1	3–2	6–4
Marítimo	Europa League	3rd qual. round	(Wales) Bangor City	8–2	2–1	10–3
Marítimo	Europa League	Play-off round	(Belarus) BATE Borisov	0–3	1–2	1–5

* For group games in Champions League or Europa League, score in home game is displayed
** For group games in Champions League or Europa League, score in away game is displayed

== Domestic league tables ==
=== Liga de Honra ===
Pos	Team	Pld	W	D	L	GF	GA	GD	Pts	Promotion or relegation
1	Gil Vicente (C, P)	30	15	10	5	55	38	+17	55 (Note: GVI 3–2 FEI; FEI 0–1 GIV)	Promotion to Primeira Liga
2	Feirense (P)	30	17	4	9	41	31	+10	55	Promotion to Primeira Liga
3	Trofense	30	15	9	6	41	27	+14	54	
4	Oliveirense	30	12	9	9	36	35	+1	45	
5	Arouca	30	11	10	9	47	41	+6	43	
6	Leixões	30	10	12	8	35	27	+8	42	
7	Moreirense	30	10	10	10	36	41	−5	40 (Note: MFC 1–0 DAV; DAV 2–2 MFC)	
8	Desportivo das Aves	30	10	10	10	35	31	+4	40	
9	Santa Clara	30	10	8	12	26	29	−3	38 (Note: STC 1–0 ESP; ESP 0–2 STC)	
10	Estoril	30	9	11	10	36	31	+5	38	
11	Freamunde	30	8	13	9	37	39	−2	37	
12	Penafiel	30	9	9	12	37	44	−7	36	
13	Belenenses	30	8	11	11	33	36	−3	35	
14	Sporting da Covilhã	30	9	5	16	32	48	−16	32	
15	Varzim (R)	30	6	13	11	38	48	−10	31	Relegation to Segunda Divisão
16	Fátima (R)	30	5	8	17	29	49	−20	23	Relegation to Segunda Divisão

Source: Liga Orangina (Liga Honra)
Rules for classification: 1) points; 2) head-to-head points; 3) head-to-head goal difference; 4) head-to-head goals scored; 5) goal difference; 6) number of goals scored.
(C) Champions; (P) Promoted; (R) Relegated

== Portugal national football team ==
=== UEFA Euro 2012 qualifying ===
==== Qualifying group stage ====
Pos	Team	Pld	W	D	L	GF	GA	GD	Pts	Qualification	(Denmark)	(Portugal)	(Norway)	(Iceland)	(Cyprus)
1	Denmark	8	6	1	1	15	6	+9	19	Qualify for final tournament	—	2–1	2–0	1–0	2–0
2	Portugal	8	5	1	2	21	12	+9	16 (Note: Tied on head-to-head results. Overall goal difference was used as the tiebreaker.)	Advance to play-offs	3–1	—	1–0	5–3	4–4
3	Norway	8	5	1	2	10	7	+3	16		1–1	1–0	—	1–0	3–1
4	Iceland	8	1	1	6	6	14	−8	4		0–2	1–3	1–2	—	1–0
5	Cyprus	8	0	2	6	7	20	−13	2		1–4	0–4	1–2	0–0	—

Source: UEFA
Rules for classification: Qualification tiebreakers
Notes:

3 September 2010
20:45 UTC+1

Portugal	4 – 4	Cyprus
Almeida 8'; Meireles 29'; Danny 50'; Fernandes 60'	Report	Aloneftis 3'; Konstantinou 11'; Okkas 57'; Avraam 89'

Estádio D. Afonso Henriques, Guimarães
Attendance: 9,100
Referee: Mark Clattenburg (England)

7 September 2010
20:30 UTC+2

Norway	1 – 0	Portugal
Huseklepp 21'	Report

Ullevaal Stadion, Oslo
Attendance: 24,535
Referee: Laurent Duhamel (France)

8 October 2010
20:45 UTC+1

Portugal	3 – 1	Denmark
Nani 29', 31'; Ronaldo 85'	Report	Carvalho 80' (o.g.)

Estádio do Dragão, Porto
Attendance: 27,117
Referee: Eric Braamhaar (Netherlands)

12 October 2010
19:45 UTC±0

Iceland	1 – 3	Portugal
Helguson 17'	Report	Ronaldo 3'; Meireles 27'; Postiga 72'

Laugardalsvöllur, Reykjavík
Attendance: 9,767
Referee: Thomas Einwaller (Austria)

4 June 2011
21:00 UTC+1

Portugal	1 – 0	Norway
Postiga 53'	Report

Estádio da Luz, Lisbon
Attendance: 47,829
Referee: Cüneyt Çakır (Turkey)

2 September 2011
21:45 UTC+3

Cyprus	0 – 4	Portugal
	Report	Ronaldo 35' (pen.), 83'; Almeida 84'; Danny 90+2'

GSP Stadium, Nicosia
Attendance: 15,444
Referee: Gianluca Rocchi (Italy)

7 October 2011
21:00 UTC+1

Portugal	5 – 3	Iceland
Nani 13', 21'; Postiga 45'; Moutinho 81'; Eliseu 87'	Report	Jónasson 48', 68'; G. Sigurðsson 90+3' (pen.)

Estádio do Dragão, Porto
Attendance: 35,715
Referee: Bas Nijhuis (Netherlands)

11 October 2011
20:15 UTC+2

Denmark	2 – 1	Portugal
Krohn-Dehli 13'; Bendtner 63'	Report	Ronaldo 90+2'

Parken Stadium, Copenhagen
Attendance: 37,012
Referee: Nicola Rizzoli (Italy)

==== Qualifying play-offs ====
11 November 2011
20:00 UTC+1

Bosnia and Herzegovina	0 – 0	Portugal
	Report

Bilino Polje, Zenica
Attendance: 12,352
Referee: Howard Webb (England)

15 November 2011
21:00 UTC±0

Portugal	6 – 2	Bosnia and Herzegovina
Ronaldo 8', 53'; Nani 24'; Postiga 72', 82'; Veloso 80'	Report	Misimović 41' (pen.); Spahić 65'

Estádio da Luz, Lisbon
Attendance: 47,728
Referee: Wolfgang Stark (Germany)
