= Manuel Serra =

Portuguese footballer

Personal information
- Full name: Manuel Francisco Serra
- Date of birth: 6 November 1935
- Place of birth: Lisbon, Portugal
- Date of death: 5 August 1994 (aged 58)
- Place of death: Agualva-Cacém, Portugal
- Position: Right-back

Senior career*
Years	Team	Apps	(Gls)
1956–1963	Benfica	109	(0)

International career
1959	Portugal	1	(0)
- * Club domestic league appearances and goals

Manuel Francisco Serra (6 November 1935 – 5 August 1994), commonly known as Serra, was a Portuguese footballer who played as a defender for Benfica.

== Personal life ==
Serra was born in the São Sebastião da Pedreira parish of Lisbon on 6 November 1935. He was murdered on 5 August 1994 at the age of 58, having been shot by a cousin in Agualva-Cacém.

== Honours ==
- European Cup: 1960–61, 1961–62
- Primeira Liga: 1956–57, 1959–60, 1960–61
- Taça de Portugal: 1957–58, 1958–59, 1961–62
