= Mário de Carvalho (footballer) =

Portuguese footballer

Mário Carvalho
Personal information
- Full name: Mário de Carvalho
- Date of birth: 15 March 1905
- Place of birth: Portugal
- Date of death: Deceased
- Position: Forward

Senior career*
Years	Team	Apps	(Gls)
- Benfica

International career
1925	Portugal	2	(0)
- * Club domestic league appearances and goals

Mário de Carvalho (15 March 1905 – deceased) was a Portuguese footballer who played as forward.

== Football career ==
Carvalho gained two caps for Portugal, making his debut on 15 May 1925 in Lisbon against Spain, in a 0–2 defeat.
