= Pedro Silva (Portuguese footballer) =

Portuguese footballer

Personal information
- Place of birth: Portugal
- Place of death: Portugal
- Position(s): Half-back

Senior career*
Years	Team	Apps	(Gls)
1929–1934	Benfica	21	(8)
- *Club domestic league appearances and goals

Pedro Silva is a former Portuguese footballer who played as a half-back.

He is mostly known for his five-year spell at Benfica, where he won two major honours.

== Career ==
Silva arrived at Benfica in 1929 and made his debut on 17 February, against Belenenses. He played 10 games in all competitions, scoring seven goals, helping the club win the Campeonato de Portugal. The following season, he scored once in five games in the same competition, with Benfica retaining the trophy. In 1931–32, he played alongside Guedes Gonçalves, but Benfica only reach the semi-finals of the Campeonato de Portugal.

A year later, he played three games in the Campeonato de Lisboa, scoring once, as Benfica won a competition. In his last year at Benfica, he only played twice in the Campeonato de Lisboa, subsequently leaving the club with 24 goals in 50 appearances and winning three honours.

== Honours ==
Benfica

- Campeonato de Portugal: 1929–30, 1930–31
- Campeonato de Lisboa: 1932–33
