= Félix Salvador =

Portuguese footballer

Salvador
Personal information
- Full name: Félix Martins Salvador
- Date of birth: 1 August 1932 (age 94)
- Place of birth: Portugal
- Position: Forward

Senior career*
Years	Team	Apps	(Gls)
- Benfica

International career
1957	Portugal	4	(0)
- * Club domestic league appearances and goals

Félix Martins Salvador (born 1 August 1932) is a former Portuguese footballer who played as forward.
