= Artur Dyson =

Portuguese footballer

Personal information
- Full name: Artur Dyson Santos
- Date of birth: 9 January 1912
- Place of birth: Lisbon, Portugal
- Date of death: 14 October 1985 (aged 73)
- Position: Goalkeeper

Senior career*
Years	Team	Apps	(Gls)
1930–1936	Sporting		

International career
1931–1935	Portugal	4	(0)
- * Club domestic league appearances and goals

Artur Dyson dos Santos (9 January 1912 in Lisbon – 14 October 1985), former Portuguese footballer who played goalkeeper for Sporting and the Portugal national team.

== International career ==
Dyson made his debut for the national team 31 May 1931 against Belgium in a 3-2 victory in Lisbon.
