= Augusto Dinis =

Portuguese footballer

Personal information
- Place of birth: Portugal
- Place of death: Portugal
- Position: Half-back

Senior career*
Years	Team	Apps	(Gls)
1929–1933	Benfica	21	(7)
- * Club domestic league appearances and goals

Augusto Dinis is a Portuguese former footballer who played as a half-back.

Dinis is mostly known for his four-year spell at Benfica, where he won two major honours.

== Career ==
Dinis arrived at Benfica in 1929, but only made his debut on 14 May 1930, against Carcavelinhos, on the path to the Campeonato de Portugal win. In the following season, he partnered with Vítor Silva and Manuel de Oliveira at the front, helping Benfica retain the Campeonato de Portugal title, appearing in 15 games and scoring four goals.

A year later, Dinis helped Benfica reach the semi-finals of the Campeonato de Portugal. He played 12 games in 1932–33, 10 in the Campeonato de Lisboa, scoring twice, as Benfica won a competition. His last game was on 18 May 1933, opening the score in the Lisbon Championship final with Beleneses.

== Honours ==
Benfica

- Campeonato de Portugal: 1929–30, 1930–31
- Campeonato de Lisboa: 1932–33
