= João Oliveira (footballer, born 1906) =

Portuguese footballer

Personal information
- Full name: João de Oliveira
- Date of birth: 22 May 1906
- Place of birth: Portugal
- Position: Forward

Senior career*
Years	Team	Apps	(Gls)
- Benfica

International career
1931	Portugal	1	(0)
- * Club domestic league appearances and goals

João de Oliveira (born 22 May 1906) was a Portuguese footballer who played as a forward.
