= Augusto Amaro =

Portuguese footballer

Personal information
- Full name: Augusto Marques Rodrigues Amaro
- Date of birth: 5 February 1911
- Place of birth: Portugal
- Position: Goalkeeper

Senior career*
Years	Team	Apps	(Gls)
- Benfica

International career
1934	Portugal	2	(0)
- * Club domestic league appearances and goals

Augusto Marques Rodrigues Amaro (born 5 February 1911, date of death unknown) was a Portuguese footballer who played as a goalkeeper.
