= List of S.L. Benfica managers =

Sport Lisboa e Benfica is a Portuguese professional football team based in Lisbon. It was founded as Sport Lisboa on 28 February 1904, following a meeting of former Casa Pia students, led by Cosme Damião, at Farmácia Franco (Franco Pharmacy). Since the club lacked a field to play, it merged with Grupo Sport Benfica on 13 September 1908, thus being renamed Sport Lisboa e Benfica.

Benfica was one of the eight founding members of the Primeira Liga in 1934, and won their first league title in 1935–36, the first of 38 league titles. Moreover, they have won 26 Portuguese Cups, 3 Campeonato de Portugal (the predecessor of the Portuguese Cup), plus a number of other more recently established trophies. Internationally, Benfica have been crowned champions of European football on two occasions, when they won the European Cup in 1961 and 1962.

This page includes a chronological list comprising all those who have held the position of manager of Benfica's first team since its foundation. Each manager's entry includes his dates of tenure and the club's overall competitive record (in terms of matches won, drawn, and lost), honours won and significant achievements while under his care. Caretaker managers are included (when known), as well as those who have been in permanent charge. The club's longest-serving manager is Cosme Damião, who managed the team from 1908 to 1926, totalling 18 years.

== Managerial history ==
Benfica's first manager ever was Manuel Gourlade, an employee at Fármacia Franco and the club's treasury manager. He served for sixteen matches, from the team's first official match on 4 November 1906 until the end of their second season, in 1907–08, when eight players defected to Sporting CP. From then on, Cosme Damião took over and led the club to its first ever Lisbon Championship, in the 1909–10 season. Until the end of the 1910s, he won seven more championships – the last one, in 1920, was particularly hard because of another mass player defection to recently created clubs Os Belenenses and Casa Pia. Facing a much less talented squad and an ever increasing debt related to the construction of football fields, Benfica entered a trophyless period, which led to the departure of Cosme Damião in 1926, after 18 years in charge.

Damião was replaced by Ribeiro dos Reis, a former player of the club who had recently managed the Portugal national team. Despite the slight improvement of Benfica's performances, he failed to win any silverware, ending his spell in 1929 to make way for a foreign manager, Arthur John, who would also double as a masseur for the club's other sports. He was much more successful, leading the club to its first national title, the Championship of Portugal in 1929–30, and retaining it in the next season. Following his move to Sporting in the next season, Benfica reappointed Ribeiro dos Reis for a second spell; nonetheless, he did not fare much better in his second year, adding only a Lisbon Championship, by then a second grade competition. He was succeeded by Vítor Gonçalves in 1934, who would reconquer the Championship of Portugal in his first season and lead the team to their first ever Primeira Liga title in his second tenure.

The managerial changes continued in 1936, with Benfica hiring the first of six Hungarian managers, Lippo Hertzka, who had led Real Madrid to their first La Liga title in 1932. He remained victorious at Benfica, adding two more Primeira Liga titles in three seasons. In 1939, Benfica changed manager again, hiring János Biri. In his first year, he won the club's last Lisbon Championship as well as their first Portuguese Cup. Over the following six seasons, he managed the team in 272 games, winning three Primeira Liga titles and another two Portuguese Cups. With the appearance of Sporting's "five violins" in 1946, Benfica attempted to fight them by sacking Biri at the end of the season and rehiring Hertzka. Under his guidance, Benfica led the 1947–48 league for most of the season; however, they finished in second place, equalised on points with Sporting but with one goal less. Benfica then returned to English managers, hiring Ted Smith in 1948. He guided the team to the Portuguese Cup in his first year, to the league title and to their first international trophy, the Latin Cup, in his second year. He later concluded his two remaining seasons at Benfica with two more Portuguese Cup trophies – although the latter cup was also conquered by his assistant, Cândido Tavares, after Smith's return to England.

For 1952–53, Benfica hired Alberto Zozaya only to be replaced in the middle of the season by Ribeiro dos Reis, whose third spell at the club would lead them to a second place league finish and one Portuguese Cup. Later on, Ribeiro dos Reis led the club halfway through the next year, with José Valdivieso ending their first trophyless season in five years. Benfica then hired Otto Glória, a Brazilian manager that would revolutionise the club by introducing professionalisation. He introduced: a house for the players to focus before matches, and to strengthen discipline; increased wages, allowing professional footballers instead of part-time players; improved physical training; careful supervision of the players' food; regular medical check-ups; an academic program to improve the players' education; the teaching of English language and also, through etiquette, on how to dress and eat.

== Statistics ==
Information correct as of 30 October 2026. Only competitive matches are counted.
Table headers

- Nat. – The coach's nationality is given as his country of birth.
- From – The date the coach began working for Benfica.
- To – The date the coach last worked for Benfica.
- P – The number of games coached for Benfica.
- W – The number of games won as a coach.
- D – The number of games draw as a coach.
- L – The number of games lost as a coach.
- GF – The number of goals scored under his tenure.
- GA – The number of goals conceded under his tenure.
- Win% – The total winning percentage under his tenure.
- Honours – The trophies won while coaching Benfica.

Table key

- Player-coach (team player that assumed simultaneously the role of coach)
- Caretaker coach (coach who assumed temporarily the job in the absence of the incumbent head coach or until a new head coach was hired)

Managers of S.L. Benfica, their statistics and honours
Name	Nat.	From	To	P	W	D	L	GF	GA	Win%	Honours	N
Manuel Gourlade	(Portugal)	4 November 1906	22 March 1908	16	8	0	8	18	22	50.00		
Cosme Damião	(Portugal)	17 October 1908	28 March 1926	157	102	21	34	427	161	64.97	8 Campeonato de Lisboa	(Note: Cosme Damião served as player-coach from 1908–09 until 1915–16.)
Ribeiro dos Reis	(Portugal)	17 October 1926	26 May 1929	52	28	11	13	128	86	53.85		
Arthur John	(England)	20 October 1929	28 June 1931	46	28	6	12	137	55	60.87	2 Campeonato de Portugal	
Ribeiro dos Reis	(Portugal)	10 January 1932	30 June 1934	56	37	8	11	135	70	66.07	1 Campeonato de Lisboa	
Vítor Gonçalves	(Portugal)	1 October 1934	30 May 1936	63	41	9	13	184	91	65.08	1 Primeira Divisão; 1 Campeonato de Portugal	
Lippo Hertzka	(Hungary)	1 October 1936	25 June 1939	92	61	14	17	290	127	66.30	2 Primeira Divisão	
János Biri	(Hungary)	1 September 1939	2 July 1947	272	194	25	53	982	470	71.32	3 Primeira Divisão; 3 Taça de Portugal; 1 Campeonato de Lisboa	
Lippo Hertzka	(Hungary)	1 September 1947	30 June 1948	30	22	3	5	97	42	73.33		
Ted Smith	(England)	1 July 1948	6 April 1952	109	73	18	18	354	148	66.97	1 Primeira Divisão; 2 Taça de Portugal; 1 Latin Cup	(Note: Ted Smith resigned for personal reasons in December 1951 but unexpectedly returned in March 1952 and left again in April. The five games he coached after his return are added to the existing record.)
Cândido Tavares	(Portugal)	3 December 1951	15 June 1952	17	13	1	3	59	19	76.47	1 Taça de Portugal	
Alberto Zozaya	(Argentina)	1 September 1952	1 February 1953	15	10	1	4	45	17	66.67		
Ribeiro dos Reis	(Portugal)	2 February 1953	20 December 1953	28	19	7	2	77	28	67.86	1 Taça de Portugal	
José Valdivieso	(Argentina)	21 December 1953	31 May 1954	19	8	3	8	46	37	42.11		
Otto Glória	(Brazil)	1 August 1954	14 June 1959	169	113	30	26	447	163	66.86	2 Primeira Divisão; 2 Taça de Portugal	
José Valdivieso	(Argentina)	14 June 1959	30 June 1959	1	1	0	0	1	0	100.00	1 Taça de Portugal	
Béla Guttmann	(Hungary)	1 July 1959	30 June 1962	124	89	20	15	402	144	71.77	2 Primeira Divisão; 2 European Cup	
Fernando Caiado	(Portugal)	1 July 1962	1 July 1962	1	1	0	0	3	0	100.00	1 Taça de Portugal	
Fernando Riera	(Chile)	1 October 1962	30 May 1963	43	33	5	5	130	44	76.74	1 Primeira Divisão	
Lajos Czeizler	(Hungary)	1 June 1963	30 June 1964	41	33	6	2	169	44	80.49	1 Primeira Divisão; 1 Taça de Portugal	
Elek Schwartz	(Romania)	1 July 1964	30 June 1965	46	33	7	6	157	41	71.74	1 Primeira Divisão	
Béla Guttmann	(Hungary)	1 July 1965	30 June 1966	38	25	7	6	116	51	65.79		
Fernando Riera	(Chile)	1 July 1966	30 November 1967	49	35	8	6	123	33	71.43	Primeira Divisão	(Note: Fernando Riera resigned after unpaid salaries and was replaced by his assistant, Fernando Cabrita.)
Fernando Cabrita	(Portugal)	1 December 1967	7 April 1968	18	13	2	3	51	17	72.22		
Otto Glória	(Brazil)	8 April 1968	8 February 1970	75	45	16	14	170	65	60.00	2 Primeira Divisão; 1 Taça de Portugal	
José Augusto	(Portugal)	9 February 1970	14 May 1970	16	12	3	1	44	13	75.00	1 Taça de Portugal	
Jimmy Hagan	(England)	30 June 1970	23 September 1973	120	94	14	12	339	80	78.33	3 Primeira Divisão; 1 Taça de Portugal	
Fernando Cabrita	(Portugal)	24 September 1973	9 June 1974	35	24	6	5	83	25	68.57		
Milorad Pavić	(Socialist Federal Republic of Yugoslavia)	1 July 1974	30 June 1975	41	27	10	4	86	21	65.85	1 Primeira Divisão	
Mário Wilson	(Portugal)	1 July 1975	30 June 1976	37	25	5	7	108	32	67.57	1 Primeira Divisão	
John Mortimore	(England)	1 July 1976	30 June 1979	114	79	22	13	244	77	69.30	1 Primeira Divisão	
Mário Wilson	(Portugal)	1 July 1979	30 June 1980	39	27	7	5	102	27	69.23	1 Taça de Portugal	
Lajos Baróti	(Hungary)	1 July 1980	30 June 1982	92	63	16	13	187	59	68.48	1 Primeira Divisão; 1 Taça de Portugal; 1 Supertaça de Portugal	
Sven-Göran Eriksson	(Sweden)	1 July 1982	30 June 1984	91	65	17	9	223	60	71.43	2 Primeira Divisão; 1 Taça de Portugal	
Pál Csernai	(Hungary)	1 July 1984	30 June 1985	45	28	7	10	100	41	62.22	1 Taça de Portugal	
John Mortimore	(England)	1 July 1985	4 June 1987	88	60	19	9	173	52	68.18	1 Primeira Divisão; 2 Taça de Portugal; 1 Supertaça Cândido de Oliveira	
Ebbe Skovdahl	(Denmark)	10 July 1987	28 November 1987	16	10	3	3	24	7	62.50		
Toni	(Portugal)	29 November 1987	30 May 1989	87	52	24	11	158	52	59.77	1 Primeira Divisão	
Sven-Göran Eriksson	(Sweden)	1 July 1989	30 June 1992	143	94	31	18	304	85	65.73	1 Primeira Divisão; 1 Supertaça Cândido de Oliveira	
Tomislav Ivić	(Croatia)	1 July 1992	25 October 1992	12	7	3	2	23	8	58.33		
Toni	(Portugal)	26 October 1992	30 June 1994	85	57	19	9	176	62	67.06	1 Primeira Divisão; 1 Taça de Portugal	
Artur Jorge	(Portugal)	1 July 1994	9 September 1995	54	28	15	11	92	45	51.85		
Mário Wilson	(Portugal)	10 September 1995	30 June 1996	43	29	7	7	77	39	67.44	1 Taça de Portugal	
Paulo Autuori	(Brazil)	1 July 1996	19 January 1997	23	14	4	5	43	19	60.87		
Mário Wilson	(Portugal)	20 January 1997	26 January 1997	1	0	0	1	1	2	0.00		
Manuel José	(Portugal)	26 January 1997	20 September 1997	29	14	5	10	39	33	48.28		
Mário Wilson	(Portugal)	21 September 1997	1 November 1997	6	3	3	0	9	4	50.00		
Graeme Souness	(Scotland)	1 November 1997	2 May 1999	71	41	15	15	139	65	57.75		
Shéu	(Portugal)	3 May 1999	30 May 1999	4	2	1	1	10	5	50.00		
Jupp Heynckes	(Germany)	31 May 1999	20 September 2000	48	27	8	13	81	55	56.25		
José Mourinho	(Portugal)	20 September 2000	5 December 2000	11	6	3	2	17	9	54.55		
Toni	(Portugal)	7 December 2000	27 December 2001	43	17	16	10	67	58	39.53		
Jesualdo Ferreira	(Portugal)	29 December 2001	25 November 2002	30	16	7	7	65	32	53.33		
Fernando Chalana	(Portugal)	25 November 2002	30 November 2002	1	1	0	0	3	0	100.00		
José Antonio Camacho	(Spain)	1 December 2002	25 May 2004	71	47	14	10	133	60	66.20	1 Taça de Portugal	
Giovanni Trapattoni	(Italy)	5 July 2004	31 May 2005	51	29	10	12	82	50	56.86	1 Primeira Liga	
Ronald Koeman	(Netherlands)	8 June 2005	8 May 2006	49	27	11	11	64	38	55.10	1 Supertaça Cândido de Oliveira	
Fernando Santos	(Portugal)	20 May 2006	20 August 2007	49	29	11	9	86	41	59.18		
José Antonio Camacho	(Spain)	20 August 2007	9 March 2008	38	18	13	7	57	29	47.37		
Fernando Chalana	(Portugal)	10 March 2008	11 May 2008	10	3	3	4	13	13	30.00		
Quique Flores	(Spain)	24 May 2008	8 June 2009	44	23	12	9	73	47	52.27	1 Taça da Liga	
Jorge Jesus	(Portugal)	17 June 2009	4 June 2015	321	225	51	45	674	249	70.09	3 Primeira Liga; 1 Taça de Portugal; 5 Taça da Liga; 1 Supertaça Cândido de Oliveira	
Rui Vitória	(Portugal)	15 June 2015	4 January 2019	180	123	27	30	382	160	68.33	2 Primeira Liga; 1 Taça de Portugal; 1 Taça da Liga; 2 Supertaça Cândido de Oliveira	
Bruno Lage	(Portugal)	3 January 2019	4 July 2020	76	51	12	13	181	75	67.11	1 Primeira Liga; 1 Supertaça Cândido de Oliveira	(Note: Caretaker until 14 January 2019)
Nélson Veríssimo	(Portugal)	30 June 2020	1 August 2020	6	4	1	1	13	5	66.67		
Jorge Jesus	(Portugal)	3 August 2020	28 December 2021	83	52	17	14	182	80	62.65		
Nélson Veríssimo	(Portugal)	28 December 2021	13 May 2022	25	12	7	6	41	29	48.00		
Roger Schmidt	(Germany)	18 May 2022	31 August 2024	115	80	20	15	250	97	69.57	1 Primeira Liga; 1 Supertaça Cândido de Oliveira	
Bruno Lage	(Portugal)	5 September 2024	17 September 2025	64	45	9	10	152	56	70.31	1 Taça da Liga; 1 Supertaça Cândido de Oliveira	
José Mourinho	(Portugal)	18 September 2025	9 June 2026	45	27	10	8	86	39	60.00		
Marco Silva	(Portugal)	9 June 2026	Present	19	15	2	2	59	17	78.95		

== See also ==
- List of S.L. Benfica players
- List of S.L. Benfica presidents
