= 1907–08 Sport Lisboa season =

Benfica
1907–08 season
- President: José Rosa Rodrigues; Januário Barreto; João José Pires
- Coach: Manuel Gourlade
- Campeonato de Lisboa: 3rd
- Top goalscorer: League: Eduardo Corga (4); All: Eduardo Corga (4)
Home colours

The 1907–08 season was Sport Lisboa e Benfica's third season in existence and the club's second competitive season, still under the name Sport Lisboa.

== Campeonato de Lisboa ==
=== Table ===
Pos	Team	Pld	W	D	L	GF	GA	GD	Pts
1	Carcavelos	10	10	0	0	61	6	+55	20
2	Sporting CP	10	7	0	3	11	15	−4	14
3	Benfica	10	5	0	5	13	16	−3	10
4	Lisbon Cricket	10	4	1	5	13	16	−3	9
5	Internacional	10	2	0	8	11	30	−19	4
6	Cruz Negra	10	1	1	8	5	31	−26	3

Rules for classification: 1) Points; 2) Head-to-head points; 3) Head-to-head goal difference.

=== Matches ===
17 November 1907 1	Carcavelos	4–1	Benfica	Campo da Quinta Nova, Cascais
			António Alves

24 November 1907 2	Internacional	0–1	Benfica	Campo da Feiteira
			Eduardo Corga

1 December 1907 3	Benfica	1–2	Sporting CP	Campo da Feiteira
	Eduardo Corga 50'		Cosme Damião (o.g.); Cândido Rosa Rodrigues	Referee: Burtenshaw

6 December 1907 4	Benfica	3–0	Cruz Negra	Campo da Feiteira
	Eduardo Corga; Cosme Damião; Félix Bermudes

19 January 1908 5	Benfica	2–5	Carcavelos	Campo da Feiteira
	Eduardo Corga; António Alves

25 January 1908 6	Lisbon Cricket	3–1	Benfica	Lisbon
			Henrique Teixeira

7	Sporting CP	2–1	Benfica	Sítio das Mouras, Lisbon
	Leopoldo Mocho (o.g.); António Rosa Rodrigues		António Meireles

7 March 1908 8	Benfica	(Note: Benfica were awarded a victory as Lisbon Cricket failed to appear on field.)	Lisbon Cricket	Campo da Feiteira

15 March 1908 9	Cruz Negra	(Note: Benfica were awarded a victory as Cruz Negra failed to appear on field.)	Benfica

22 March 1908 10	Benfica	3–0	Internacional	Lisbon
	Cosme Damião; Álvaro Corga; António Costa			Stadium: Estádio de Lisboa

== Player statistics ==
No.	Pos	Nat	Player	Total		1907–08 Campeonato de Lisboa	
No.	Pos	Nat	Player	Apps	Goals	Apps	Goals
	DF	(Portugal) POR	Alfredo Machado	2	0	2	0
	FW	(Portugal) POR	Álvaro Corga	1	0	1	0
	FW	(Portugal) POR	António Alves	6	2	6	2
	MF	(Portugal) POR	António Costa	8	1	8	1
	FW	(Portugal) POR	António Meireles	8	1	8	1
	MF	(Portugal) POR	Artur José Pereira	1	0	1	0
	FW	(Portugal) POR	Carlos França	6	0	6	0
	FW	(Portugal) POR	Constantino da Encarnação	1	0	1	0
	MF	(Portugal) POR	Cosme Damião	8	2	8	2
	MF	(Portugal) POR	Domingos Simões	1	0	1	0
	FW	(Portugal) POR	Eduardo Corga	8	4	8	4
	FW	(Portugal) POR	Félix Bermudes	6	1	6	1
	DF	(Portugal) POR	Henrique Teixeira	4	1	4	1
	GK	(Portugal) POR	João de Carvalho Persónio	8	0	8	0
	DF	(Portugal) POR	Leopoldo José Mocho	6	0	6	0
	MF	(Portugal) POR	Luís Kruss Gomes	1	0	1	0
	MF	(Portugal) POR	Luís Vieira	7	0	7	0
	MF	(Portugal) POR	Marcolino Bragança	6	0	6	0
