= 1909–10 S.L. Benfica season =

Benfica
1909–10 season
- President: João José Pires; Alfredo Luís da Silva
- Coach: Cosme Damião
- Campeonato de Lisboa: 1st
Home colours

The 1909–10 season was Sport Lisboa e Benfica's sixth season in existence and the club's fourth competitive season. Benfica won their first and regional title, the Campeonato de Lisboa.

== Campeonato de Lisboa ==
=== Table ===
Pos	Team	Pld	W	D	L	GF	GA	GD	Pts
1	Benfica	10	8	0	2	24	5	+19	16
2	Carcavelos	10	7	1	2	27	5	+22	15
3	Internacional	10	5	1	4	15	6	+9	11
4	Belenense	10	3	2	5	8	21	−13	8
5	Sporting CP	10	2	3	5	10	18	−8	7
6	Gilman	10	0	1	9	2	31	−29	1

Rules for classification: 1) Points; 2) Head-to-head points; 3) Head-to-head goal difference.

=== Matches ===
17 October 1909 1	Benfica	3–0	Belenense	Campo da Feiteira

14 November 1909 2	Carcavelos	2–0	Benfica	Campo da Feiteira

21 November 1909 3	Internacional	0–2	Benfica	Campo da Feiteira
			António Rosa Rodrigues; Cosme Damião

8 December 1909 4	Benfica	2–0	Sporting CP	Campo da Feiteira

5	Benfica	1–0	Gilman	Campo da Feiteira

9 January 1910 6	Belenense	1–4	Benfica
			Cosme Damião; Luís Vieira; Josué Correia

23 January 1910 7	Benfica	1–0	Carcavelos	Campo da Feiteira
	Germano de Vasconcelos			Attendance: 8,000

2 February 1910 8	Benfica	0–2	Internacional	Campo da Feiteira

27 February 1910 9	Sporting CP	0–4	Benfica	Sítio das Mouras, Lisbon
				Referee: Henry Frood (England)

27 March 1910 10	Gilman	0–7	Benfica

== Player statistics ==
No.	Pos	Nat	Player	Total		1909–10 Campeonato de Lisboa	
No.	Pos	Nat	Player	Apps	Goals	Apps	Goals
	FW	(Portugal) POR	Alberto Rio	1	0	1	-
	GK	(Portugal) POR	Alfredo Machado	10	0	10	-
	FW	(Portugal) POR	Álvaro Corga	1	0	1	-
	DF	(Portugal) POR	António Alberto Marques	1	0	1	-
	MF	(Portugal) POR	António Costa	9	0	9	-
	FW	(Portugal) POR	António Meireles	10	0	10	-
	FW	(Portugal) POR	António Rosa Rodrigues	2	0	2	-
	MF	(Portugal) POR	Artur José Pereira	10	0	10	-
	MF	(Portugal) POR	Carlos Costa	3	0	3	-
	FW	(Portugal) POR	Carlos França	3	0	3	-
	DF	(Portugal) POR	Carlos Homem de Figueiredo	1	0	1	-
	MF	(Portugal) POR	Carlos Martins	1	0	1	-
	FW	(Portugal) POR	Constantino da Encarnação	4	0	4	-
	MF	(Portugal) POR	Cosme Damião	10	0	10	-
	FW	(Portugal) POR	David da Fonseca	1	0	1	-
	FW	(Portugal) POR	Germano de Vasconcelos	5	0	5	-
	DF	(Portugal) POR	Henrique Costa	10	0	10	-
	FW	(Portugal) POR	Henrique Teixeira	1	0	1	-
	FW	(Portugal) POR	Josué Correia	5	0	5	-
	DF	(Portugal) POR	Leopoldo José Mocho	3	0	3	-
	FW	(Portugal) POR	Luís Vieira	9	0	9	-
	FW	(Portugal) POR	Manuel Lopes	7	0	7	-
	FW	(Portugal) POR	Virgílio Paula	2	0	2	-
