= 1908–09 S.L. Benfica season =

Benfica
1908–09 season
- President: Januário Barreto; João José Pires
- Coach: Cosme Damião
- Campeonato de Lisboa: 2nd
- Top goalscorer: League: António Meireles (6); All: António Meireles (6)
Home colours

The 1908–09 season was Sport Lisboa e Benfica's fifth season in existence and the club's third competitive season.

== Campeonato de Lisboa ==
=== Table ===
Pos	Team	Pld	W	D	L	GF	GA	GD	Pts
1	Carcavelos	10	8	2	0	49	2	+47	18
2	Benfica	10	7	1	2	27	12	+15	15
3	Internacional	10	6	1	3	20	10	+10	13
4	Sporting CP	10	3	0	7	10	8	+2	6
5	Belenense	10	3	0	7	3	19	−16	6
6	Ajudense	10	1	0	9	0	58	−58	2

Rules for classification: 1) Points; 2) Head-to-head points; 3) Head-to-head goal difference.

=== Matches ===
4 October 1908 1	Benfica	5–0	Ajudense	Campo da Feiteira
	Cosme Damião; Henrique Costa; Eduardo Corga; António Meireles

25 October 1908 2	Benfica	2–0	Sporting CP	Campo da Feiteira
	Cosme Damião; David da Fonseca			Referee: Gaspar Pinto Basto

15 November 1908 3	Carcavelos	1–1	Benfica	Campo da Quinta Nova, Cascais
			Eduardo Corga

6 December 1908 4	Belenense	0–4	Benfica	Lisbon
			Eduardo Corga; Carlos França; António Meireles	Stadium: Estádio de Lisboa

20 December 1908 5	Benfica	2–0	Internacional	Campo da Feiteira

10 January 1909 6	Ajudense	0–4	Benfica

24 January 1909 7	Sporting CP	1–2	Benfica	Sítio das Mouras, Lisbon
	António Vital		Artur José Pereira; Leopoldo Mocho	Referee: Merik Barley (England)

14 February 1909 8	Benfica	0–4	Carcavelos	Campo da Feiteira

28 February 1909 9	Benfica	5–0	Belenense	Campo da Feiteira

19 March 1909 10	Internacional	6–2	Benfica

== Player statistics ==
No.	Pos	Nat	Player	Total		1908–09 Campeonato de Lisboa	
No.	Pos	Nat	Player	Apps	Goals	Apps	Goals
	MF	(Portugal) POR	Alberto Alves	1	0	1	0
	FW	(Portugal) POR	Alberto Rio	1	1	1	1
	FW	(Portugal) POR	Alfredo Machado	1	0	1	0
	FW	(Portugal) POR	António Costa	7	2	7	2
	FW	(Portugal) POR	António Meireles	8	6	8	6
	MF	(Portugal) POR	Artur José Pereira	7	2	7	2
	FW	(Portugal) POR	Carlos França	6	1	6	1
	FW	(Portugal) POR	Constantino da Encarnação	4	1	4	1
	MF	(Portugal) POR	Cosme Damião	7	2	7	2
	FW	(Portugal) POR	David da Fonseca	1	1	1	1
	FW	(Portugal) POR	Eduardo Corga	7	3	7	3
	DF	(Portugal) POR	Henrique Costa	7	2	7	2
	FW	(Portugal) POR	Henrique Teixeira	1	0	1	0
	GK	(Portugal) POR	João de Carvalho Persónio	7	0	7	0
	DF	(Portugal) POR	Leopoldo José Mocho	7	1	7	1
	MF	(Portugal) POR	Luís Vieira	8	1	8	1
