= Supporters of S.L. Benfica =

Portuguese sports club

Benfiquistas at the Estádio da Luz
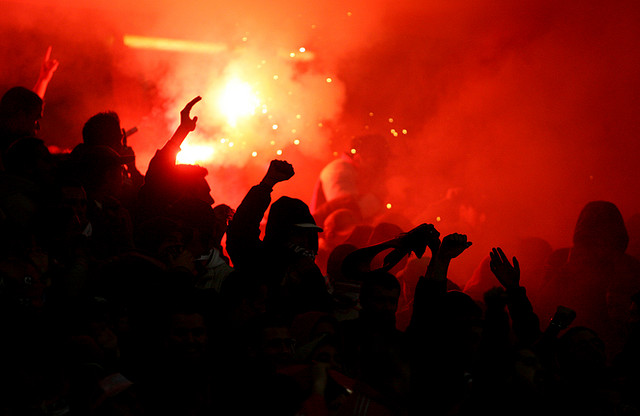
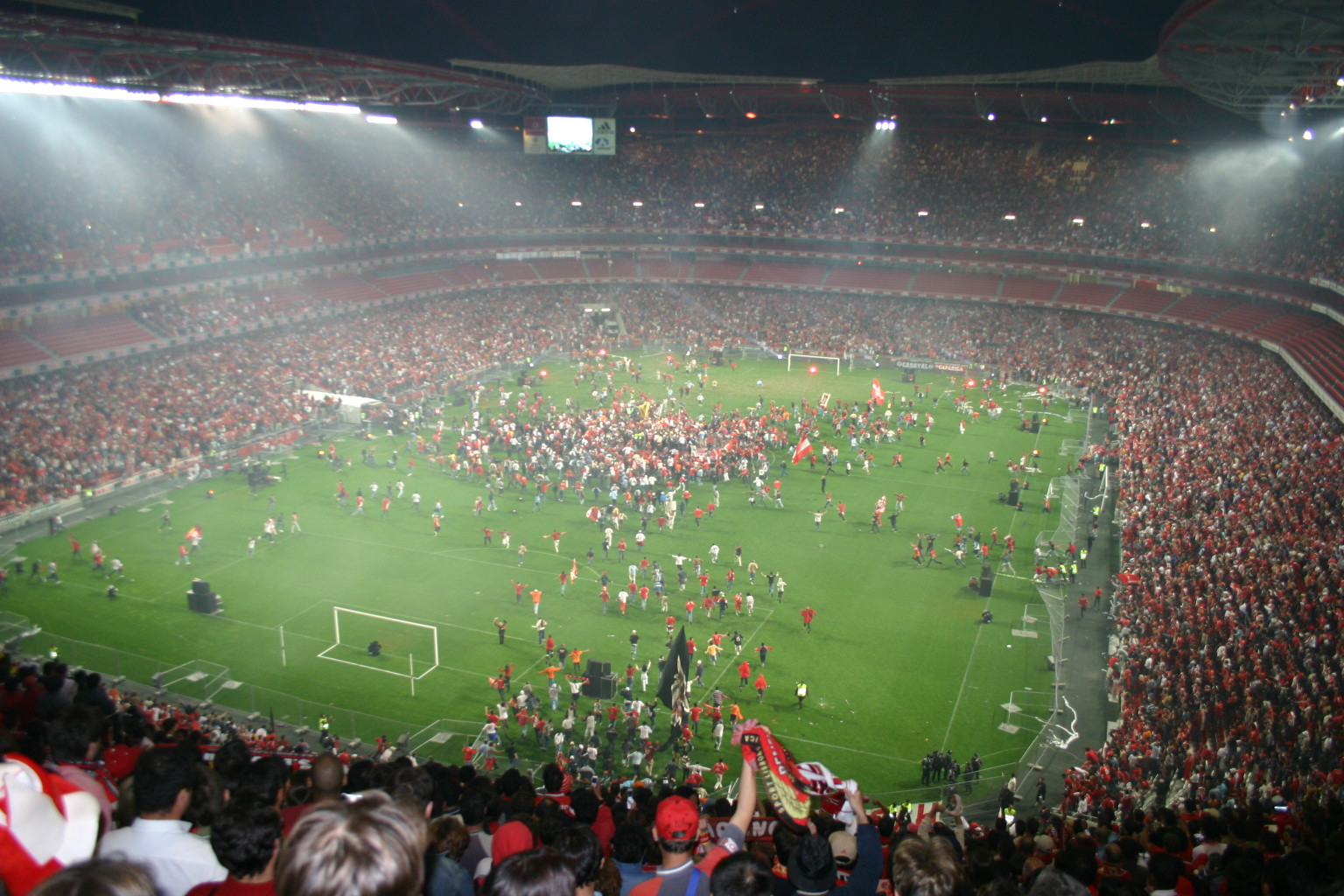
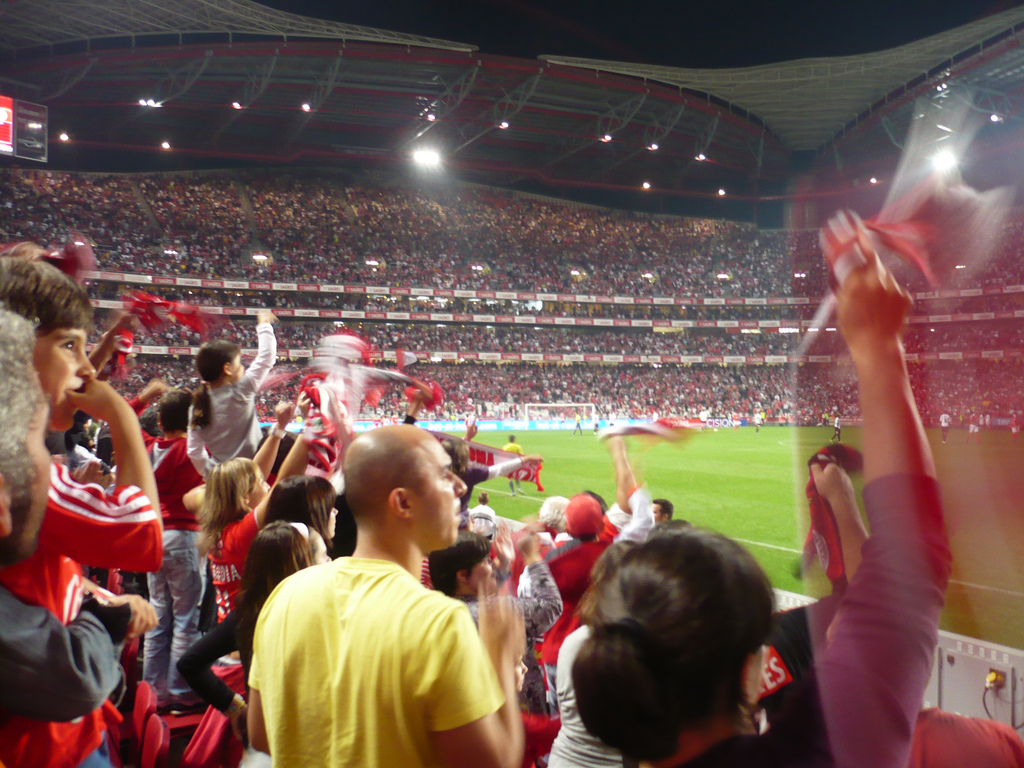

Sport Lisboa e Benfica is a Portuguese sports club based in Lisbon that was formed in Belém in 1904 by 24 football enthusiasts, including Cosme Damião. Benfica have been part of the Portuguese football top flight, Primeira Liga, since its inception in 1934. They have won 38 championships, 26 Taça de Portugal, 8 Taça da Liga, 9 Supertaça Cândido de Oliveira, 3 Campeonato de Portugal, 1 Latin Cup and 2 European Cups.

The supporters of Benfica, who are called benfiquistas, have played an important part in the club's growth during its 122-year existence. One of those cases was in the early days of the construction of the original Estádio da Luz, when club president Joaquim Ferreira Bogalho asked them for free concrete to build the stadium. They responded by offering 900,000 tons. During the Portuguese Estado Novo, the Censorship Services prohibited national newspapers from referring to the football team as Vermelhos (Reds), so it was not confused with communism. Instead, the team was referred to as Encarnados (Flesh-coloured), which is still used, even after the transition to democracy.

Benfica supporters can vary from regular ones, who do not possess any formal membership with the club, to sócios, club members, who may be eligible to vote in the club's presidential elections and other matters. In addition, there are Benfica Houses (Casas do Benfica), which are fan clubs affiliated with the sócios.

In 2005, club president Luís Filipe Vieira implemented an aggressive membership campaign with the intent of reaching 300,000 members. From roughly 95,000 members in 2000, the club reached 160,000 in 2006 – a Guinness World record back then – only one year after the beginning of the campaign. After Benfica's scheduled renumbering of members in 2015, the number decreased from 247,859 to 156,916 members, with the club losing roughly 35% of its paying associates. By October 2021, Benfica had over 250,000 members, of which 115,681 were eligible to vote in club elections.

== Fanbase and attendances ==
| Season | Primeira Liga average attendance | Best avg. |
|---|---|---|
| 2008–09 | 35,698 | No |
| 2009–10 | 50,033 | Yes |
| 2010–11 | 38,146 | Yes |
| 2011–12 | 42,530 | Yes |
| 2012–13 | 42,359 | Yes |
| 2013–14 | 43,613 | Yes |
| 2014–15 | 48,520 | Yes |
| 2015–16 | 50,322 | Yes |
| 2016–17 | 52,768 | Yes |
| 2017–18 | 53,209 | Yes |
| 2018–19 | 53,824 | Yes |
| 2019–20 | 37,044 | Yes (Note: No spectators allowed at home since matchday 28 due to the COVID-19 pandemic) |
| 2020–21 | 0 | No (Note: No spectators allowed due to the COVID-19 pandemic) |
| 2021–22 | 31,956 | Yes |
| 2022–23 | 57,108 | Yes |
| 2023–24 | 56,248 | Yes |
| 2024–25 | 58,746 | Yes (Note: Primeira Liga record) |

According to research conducted by UEFA, Benfica are the best supported team in Portugal, with 47% of the total number of supporters. Historically, Benfica have always been seen as working-class of Portugal, growing exponentially as the club accumulated titles since the 1930s. Their total number of supporters is an estimated 5.8 million fans in Portugal, for a total fanbase of roughly 14 million worldwide. In April 2010, Benfica launched SLB Fans, a social network website for its supporters.

Since 2009–10, Benfica have been consistently Portugal's best-attended team, with an average gate of 41,740 during 14 seasons (2020–21 is excluded, as there were no spectators). In 13 of those seasons, Benfica had the league's best average attendance, with 2022–23 being their best record (57,108), which was the 14th highest in Europe.

Benfica supporters pay from €100 to €160 annually to be club members, enjoying discounts with some affiliated enterprises, as well as lower prices in season tickets or merchandising.

From season ticket holders, matchday tickets, members fees, and merchandising, Benfica generated roughly €14 million in the 2013–14 season.

== Filiations ==
Since 1911, Benfica has been creating filiations and delegations, independent entities that can play football or other sports but that are closely associated with Benfica, and that are usually run by Benfica supporters. The first affiliate was Sport Lisboa e Portalegre, created by Leopoldo José Mocho, a club player at that time. The first delegation was Estrela Futebol Clube in Braga, created in November 1914. Some of these delegations have competed against Benfica, like the case of Lusitano in Algarve, that played in the Primeira Liga from 1947 to 1950. Other well known delegations are Sport Luanda e Benfica, Sport Huambo e Benfica, Sport Lubango e Benfica, and Sport London e Benfica F.C.

Aside from delegations, Benfica also has Houses (such as S.L. Benfica de Macau), which are gathering places for fans where they can buy merchandising or tickets, watch the club play, pay member fees, socialize, etc. Its creation started in the 1950s due to growing popularity of the club, the first being in Campo Maior, Alentejo. By May 2015, Benfica had 221 delegations, or houses.

== Supporters' groups ==
During the Estado Novo, no organized supporters' groups existed, as few people had the resources to follow their club throughout the country or abroad. With the transition to democracy in the mid-1970s, and with the newly-found freedom, fans started to converge together to chant for their team, leading to the creation of the first supporters' groups in Portugal, Juve Leo, in 1976.

In Portugal, supporters' groups are obligated by law to register with the Instituto Português do Desporto e Juventude (Portuguese Institute for Sport and Youth), so that clubs can provide technical, financial, and material support to those groups. Neither Diabos Vermelhos nor No Name Boys have done so.

=== Diabos Vermelhos ===
Diabos Vermelhos
- Established: 16 November 1982 (43 years ago)
- Type: Supporters' group
- Motto: Connosco Quem Quiser, Contra Nós Quem Puder
- Colours

The Diabos Vermelhos (English: Red Devils) were created on 11 November 1982 and are located in the north corner of the Estádio da Luz, known as Topo Norte.

One of the oldest Portuguese supporters' groups, they were formed when a group of fans gathered in the central ring of the original Estádio da Luz. Its creation was inspired by the European performance of 1982–83. They reached over five thousand members in the following years, but in the early nineties, a disagreement resulted in the creation of another Benfica's supporters' group, No Name Boys. That affected negatively the group, and members plummeted to an all-time low of just ten. However, as new leaders came, they helped Diabos Vermelhos recover and regain members exponentially, reaching more than 1000 members. Since the early days of the No Name Boys, clashes between the two groups are frequent.

In December 2003, Diabos Vermelhos pressured Benfica's board after the roller hockey section wanted to sign Paulo Alves, a former Porto player, who attacked one of their own during a match on 6 June 1998.

On 24 January 2012, Diabos Vermelhos announced they were missing a match against Feirense because of high prices asked by that club, with the minimum ticket price set at €25 for Benfica supporters, whereas the price for other teams' fans were usually set at €10. They also protested against modern football profit-driven business, placing banners on nearby roofs. Previously, in late 2010, Benfica had requested their supporters to boycott away games due to the unequal prices they had to pay in comparison with supporters of other teams.

=== No Name Boys ===
Иo Иame Boys
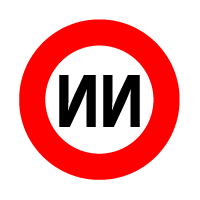
- Established: 4 March 1992 (34 years ago)
- Type: Supporters' group
- Motto: SEMPRE PRESEИTES
- Colours

The No Name Boys (Portuguese: Rapazes Sem Nome), or Иo Иame Boys, were created on 4 March 1992. They gather in the south corner of the Estádio da Luz, known as Topo Sul.

Created after disagreements with another Benfica's supporters group, Diabos Vermelhos, their initial idea was to stick together and call themselves the "Diabos Vermelhos". However, that name was already registered by head members of the remaining Diabos Vermelhos, so they became a dissent group with no name, therefore the "Иo Иame Boys".

No Name Boys made an immediate impact on Portuguese claques (supporters' groups), with a massive presence of its members in all Benfica matches, either home or away.

On 18 September 1994, three No Name Boys members ‒ Jorge "Gullit" Maurício, Ana Rita Fernandes and Laurentino "Tino" Soares ‒ died in a car accident in Mérida, Spain, while they were returning from a Benfica match against Hajduk Split for the UEFA Champions League. From this event, a friendship was made with the Hajduk Split ultras, Torcida Split.

In 1996, after an incident during the Portuguese Cup final match, which resulted in the death of a Sporting CP supporter, they almost disbanded. Afterwards, the group created a unique style in the Portuguese supporters groups' scene, distancing themselves from the traditional Italian-influenced ultras style, which was the dominant trend in Portugal during the 1990s and early 2000s.

The group is known for its secrecy, with no leading figures known to the public eye, no website and no open membership, unlike most other Portuguese supporters' groups. The No Name Boys rarely use elaborate displays at stands and do not use any kind of sound support. They prefer a more simple approach, using only a few large flags, flares and their own vocal support. Salutes are often heard at the group's stand.

They are known for their devotion and support for Benfica, especially in football and futsal. Moreover, some of its members sometimes engage in protests against the club's board, staff, or players whenever they feel things are not right. Those protests can be silent presences at matches or explicit criticism at the club's members meetings.

== See also ==
- Ser Benfiquista
