= Terras do Desembargador =

Football dirt field in Lisbon, Portugal

Coordinates: 38.699829°N 9.197093°W

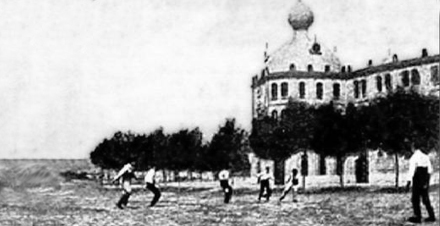
- Interactive map of Terras do Desembargador
- Location: Lisbon, Portugal
- Owner: Municipality of Lisbon
- Surface: Dirt

Construction
- Built: 1903

Tenant
- Sport Lisboa (1904–1906)

Terras do Desembargador, also known as Campo das Salésias, was a football dirt field in Lisbon, Portugal. It hosted football matches of Sport Lisboa. In 1903, football was a growing sport, and Terras do Desembargador was Lisbon's main field for playing football.

It had no fences and bystanders can freely enter the field and disrupt match. When a ball was lost to outside the field it was difficult to recover it because of the open spaces. Inconveniently it was also shared with the Portuguese Army who used it as an exercise field, so it would often be completely destroyed after a set of exercises. It was in this field that a group a friends after a match decided to create Sport Lisboa. 6 friendlies were played, Sport Lisboa won 5, lost 1, scored 13 goals and conceded 2.

Benfica left in 1907 for Campo da Feiteira, seeking more privacy and exclusively of their own field.

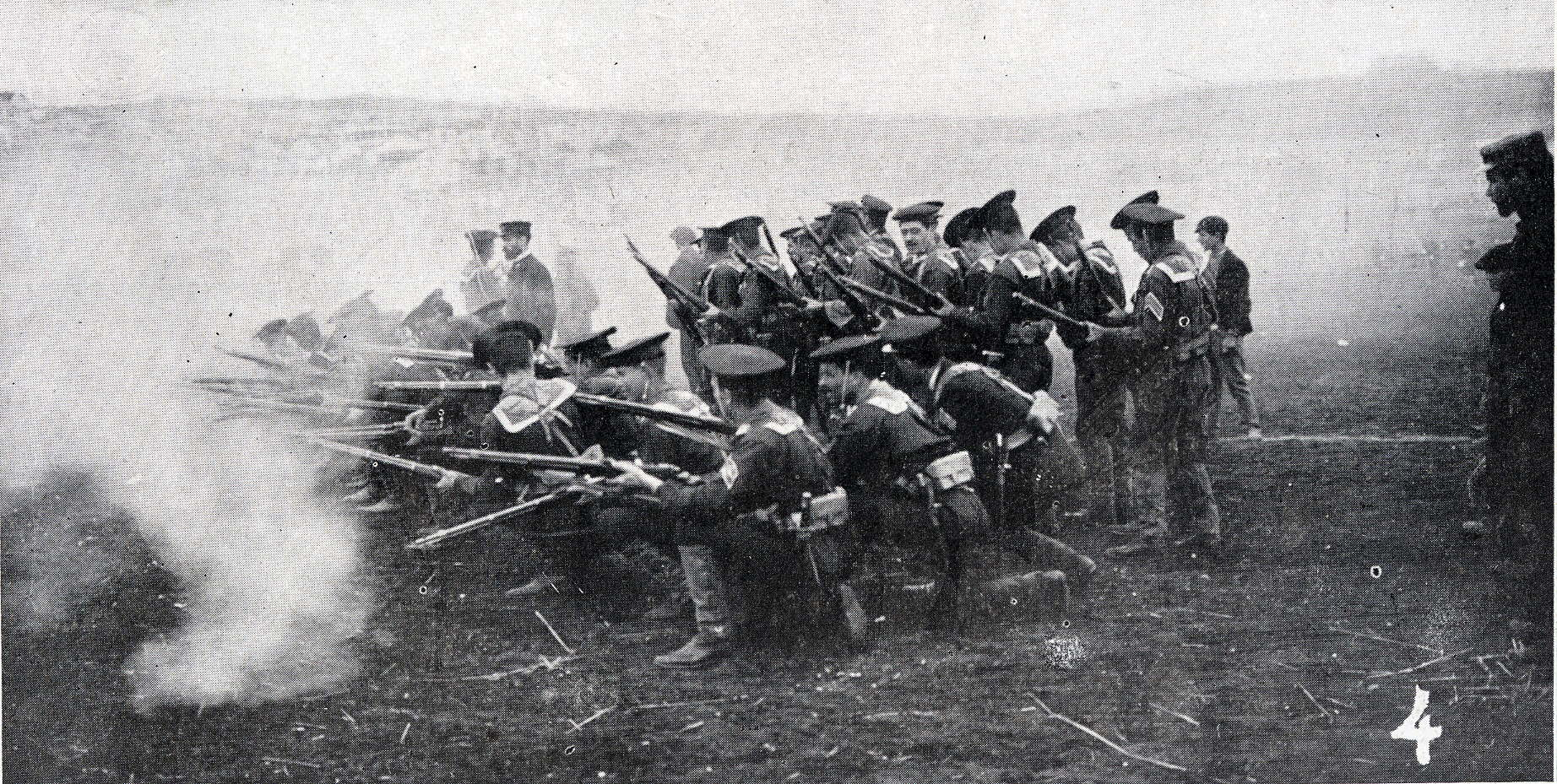
Army in exercises in Terras do Desembargador

Date	Result	Notes
13 December 1903	SLB 1–0 Clube Internacional Futebol	It has after this rematch between CIF and a mix of players of Grupo de Belém (of Catatau) and Associação do Bem (former Casapianos) that a group of friends decided to form Sport Lisboa
1 January 1904	SLB 1–0 G. Campo de Ourique	First match of Sport Lisboa, even before signing of the acta of creation. The Grupo de Campo de Ourique was one of the best team's in that time.
23 April 1905	SLB 6–0 GF Estephania	Six game of the club and 5th in Terras do Desembargador and the very first thrashing.
28 January 1906	SLB 2–1 Clube Internacional Futebol	Second game (and first win) against Internacional, considered the best mixed group (Portuguese's e Englishmen) playing in Portugal.
