= Cesina Bermudes =

Obstetrics pioneer and anti-authoritarian campaigner in Portugal

- Born: 20 May 1908; Anjos, Portugal
- Died: 9 December 2001 (aged 93); Lisbon
- Occupation: Obstetrician
- Years active: 60
- Known for: Opposition to authoritarian Estado Novo Government; Political prisoner
- Notable work: Scientific Bases of Childbirth without Pain

Cesina Borges Adães Bermudes (1908–2001) was a Portuguese obstetrician who introduced the concept of “painless childbirth” to Portugal. She was also a prominent feminist and an opponent of the Estado Novo authoritarian regime, for which she was imprisoned for three months.

== Background ==
Cesina Bermudes was born on 20 May 1908 in Lisbon, Portugal in the parish of Anjos. She was the daughter of Félix Bermudes and Cândida Emília Borges. Her father was an author and playwright as well as being a notable sportsman who represented Portugal in shooting at the Summer Olympics and was a financial supporter and president of S.L. Benfica, now one of Portugal’s leading soccer clubs. Her mother was a well-educated woman who taught her French and read Greek mythology to her at bedtime. Bermudes inherited her father’s athleticism and was a swimming champion, also taking part in skating, gymnastics and in bicycle and car races, being one of the first women in Portugal to obtain a driving license. As a cyclist, she won the first two "Tour of Lisbon" cycling races for women. Like her father she was a member of the Theosophical Society of Portugal, where she served as secretary-general. She believed in reincarnation and was a vegetarian.

After initially receiving a private education at home Cesina Mercedes attended the elite Camões Secondary School. When she joined there were four other girls in her class, but by the time she left she was the only girl in a glass with 15 boys. She graduated from the Faculty of Medicine of the University of Lisbon in 1933 and followed this with a General Internship and an Internship in Surgery with a specialty in Obstetrics. She worked as a doctor at the “Centre for Assistance to Maternity and Childhood” in Lisbon. This was followed by a period as Assistant Professor of Anatomy at a Lisbon hospital. In 1947 she became the first woman to obtain a Doctorate in medicine (with a score of 19 out of 20). The title of her thesis was Os Músculos Radiais Externos Estudados nos Portugueses de Condição Humilde (The External Radial Musculature Observed in the Portuguese Low Income Population). However, as a result of her political activism the Estado Novo did not allow her to pursue an academic teaching career. As a result, she taught at a nurses’ college.

Her political awareness had been formed in the early 1940s and she became a supporter of the opposition to the Estado Novo. In 1945 she joined the Movement of Democratic Unity, a semi-legal umbrella organization of groups that opposed the Government. She supported the candidacy of José Norton de Matos in the 1949 Portuguese presidential elections and spoke in his support at several rallies. On 14 October 1949 she was arrested by the Portuguese Secret Police (PIDE) for being a member of the Central Commission of the Women's Democratic National Movement, and held in prison at Caxias, near Lisbon, for three months. In 1950, she was involved in developing the constitution of the National Committee for the Defence of Peace.

== Promotion of childbirth without pain ==
In 1954 Cesina Bermudes travelled to Paris to study the psychoprophylactic method of childbirth, often known as the Lamaze technique after its founder the French obstetrician Fernand Lamaze. The technique aims to build a mother's confidence in her ability to give birth, through classes that help pregnant women understand how to cope with pain in ways that facilitate labour. In Paris she met three other Portuguese doctors, Joaquim Seabra-Dinis, Pedro Monjardino and João dos Santos, who she subsequently worked with to develop new techniques that would have a great impact in the way labour could be approached, including the use of medicines to stimulate birth. Back in Lisbon she introduced these techniques to Portugal. Some of her ideas were considered almost heretical at the time. Painless childbirth was still an inconceivable idea, especially for Catholics who believed that a woman should suffer when fulfilling the role of mother. Only in 1956 did Pope Pius XII lift the Catholic condemnation of childbirth without pain.

Bermudes rapidly became a highly respected figure in the medical field. She produced several articles in medical journals of which Scientific Bases of Childbirth without Pain (Bases Científicas do Parto sem Dor) in 1955 and Notes on Childbirth without Pain (Notas Soltas sobre o Parto sem Dor) in 1957 are the best known. Following the 1958 elections, when the Estado Novo was again returned to office, she disappeared from political matters to enable her to provide medical assistance to pregnant women of the Portuguese Communist Party (PCP), who were forced to live clandestinely. Forbidden by the state from working in public hospitals, she worked in clinics in Lisbon and Cascais that were devoted to supporting single mothers.

Bermudes died on 9 December 2001.

== Awards ==
- In 1989 she was awarded the Portuguese Order of Freedom (Portuguese: Ordem da Liberdade), which rewards relevant services to the cause of democracy and freedom. The order was created in 1976, after the Carnation Revolution of 1974 when the Estado Novo was overthrown.
- In 1996 she received the Movement of Democratic Unity “Distinction of Honour”.
- A street in Lisbon is named after her: Rua Cesina Adães Bermudes.
