= Ser Benfiquista =

Song
- Language: Portuguese
- English title: "Being a Benfiquista"
- Written: 1953
- Songwriter: Manuel Paulino Gomes Júnior

"Ser Benfiquista" (Portuguese pronunciation: [seɾ βɐ̃jfiˈkiʃtɐ]; English: "Being a Benfiquista") is the official anthem of Portuguese sports club S.L. Benfica.

The song acknowledges Benfica's humble beginnings and shows that being a benfiquista (a supporter of Benfica) is more than being a football fan. It is sung before every home match and sometimes during the match. It was written by Manuel Paulino Gomes Júnior and first sung on 16 April 1953 by tenor Luís Piçarra in the presence of 6000 benfiquistas at a sarau in Benfica's old arena Pavilhão dos Desportos, with the goal of raising money to build the original Estádio da Luz.

The original anthem, composed by Félix Bermudes in 1929, was called "Avante Benfica" ("Onward Benfica"). It was censored by the Estado Novo in 1942 because of the political connotation of the word avante, which was considered an affront to the establishment.
