= Félix Bermudes =

Portuguese sports shooter

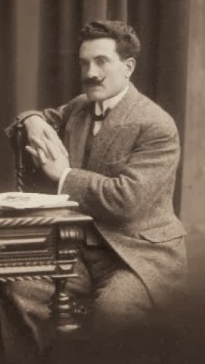
- Bermudes (c. 1910s)

Personal information
- Born: 4 July 1874 Porto, Portugal
- Died: 5 January 1960 (aged 85) Lisbon, Portugal

Sport
- Sport: Sports shooting

Félix Bermudes (4 July 1874 – 5 January 1960) was a Portuguese sports shooter. He competed in the team free rifle event at the 1924 Summer Olympics. He was also a significant author and playwright.

In 1916, Bermudes became the 10th president of sports club S.L. Benfica; he had a second term between 1945 and 1946. He composed the anthem of Benfica in 1929, called "Avante Benfica", which was censored by the Estado Novo.

Bermudes wrote many plays and film scripts, as well as magazine articles. He was one of the founding members of the Society of Portuguese Theater Writers and Composers and was its president from 1928 until his death in 1960. In 1925 he was made an Officer of the Military Order of Saint James of the Sword for Scientific, Literary and Artistic Merit. He was the father of Cesina Bermudes, a prominent obstetrician and opponent of the Estado Novo.

Preceded by José Antunes dos Santos Júnior	President of Benfica; 1916	Succeeded by Nuno Freire Themudo
Preceded by Augusto da Fonseca Júnior	President of Benfica; 1945–1946	Succeeded by Manuel da Conceição Afonso
