= Campo de Benfica =

Football grass field in Lisbon, Portugal

Coordinates: 38.748193°N 9.195848°W

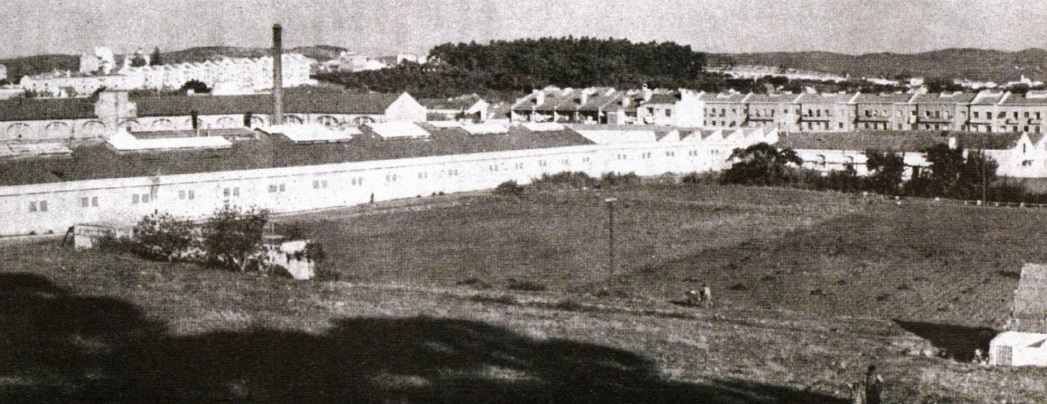
- Interactive map of Campo de Benfica
- Location: Lisbon, Portugal
- Owner: Municipality of Lisbon
- Capacity: 10,000
- Surface: Grass
- Record attendance: 10 000

Construction
- Opened: 1917
- Closed: 1923
- Cost: 840$ per year

Tenant
- Sport Lisboa e Benfica (1917–1923)

Campo de Benfica was a football grass field in Lisbon, Portugal.

== History ==
After Benfica absorbed Desportos de Benfica on 17 September 1916, it started using as headquarters, the facilities in Avenida Gomes Pereira.

In the back there was a football field since 1914 which was used by some clubs in Lisbon which did not have their own, like GS Cruz Quebrada.

Benfica celebrated with Empresa dos Melhoramentos de Benfica (EMB) – owner of the land where the field was located – an annual rent deal of 840$00 escudos, paid monthly in advance in the amount of 70$00 escudos.

Benfica then left Campo de Sete Rios. Stands with capacity of 10.000 and an additional tennis court were built. On 25 March 1919, Benfica played the first night football game in Portugal, with 1000 candles helped by 18 reflectors.

But by 1923, the Municipality of Lisbon wanted to build a road to link Estrada de Benfica to Estrada Nacional, crossing the place where the field was located (the street was only built in 1997, 74 years later).

After 1923, Benfica then moved to Estádio do Campo Grande belonging to Sporting CP and Campo de Palhavã of Império Lisboa Clube, until Estádio das Amoreiras, completed in 1925 was finished.

Between 1916 and 1923, Benfica played 27 matches, won 11, drew 6 and lost 10, scored 56, conceded 45.

Date	Result	Notes
11 November 1917	Benfica – Sporting CP	First match, for the Taça Cosme Damião.
20 April 1919	Benfica 4–0 Vitória de Setúbal	Counting for Lisbon Football Championship.
29 February 1920	Benfica 12–1 Clube Internacional de Lisboa	Major win and conquering of the Lisbon Football Championship
11 March 1923	Benfica – Imperio LC	Last match
