= Campo de Sete Rios =

Football grass field in Lisbon, Portugal

Coordinates: 38.740017°N 9.165672°W

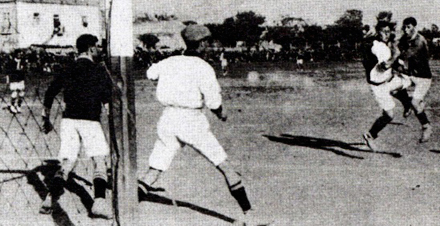
- Interactive map of Campo de Sete Rios
- Location: Lisbon, Portugal
- Owner: Private property
- Capacity: 10,000
- Surface: Grass
- Record attendance: 10 000

Construction
- Opened: 1913
- Closed: 1917
- Cost: 250$ per year

Tenant
- Sport Lisboa e Benfica (1913–1917)

Campo de Sete Rios was a football grass field in Lisbon, Portugal. When the rent at Quinta da Feiteira became too high in 1908, the managing directors looked for a solution. In the end of 1912, thanks to Cosme Damião, Benfica rented a field in a farm in Sete Rios for $250 yearly. To be able to support the rent and adequate the field, Benfica launched a fund raiser. The field was rented on 1 January 1913 next to the railway station de Sete Rios. Benfica then build a stand for 10,000 people and a tennis court.

In 1916, the owners of the land asked for $650 yearly, plus expenses and the benefactories remain on the land. Also no compensation for eventual expropriation by the Municipality of Lisbon.

Sport Lisboa e Benfica refused and left the ground in 1917 to Campo de Benfica in the back of its headquarters in Avenida Gomes Pereira.

Between 1913 and 1917, Benfica played 38 matches, won 26, draw 6 and lost 6, scored 130, conceded 40.

Date	Result	Notes
12 October 1913	SLB 4-0 Sporting CP	First match, counting for the Lisbon Football Championship.
1 January 1916	SLB 8-0 FC Porto	Thrashing of Porto Football Championship Champion.
25 February 1917	SLB 9-0 Lisboa FC	Record thrashing, 7–0 at break.
7 July 1917	SLB – V. Setúbal	Last match, friendly against V. Setúbal
