= Manuel Gourlade =

Portuguese football manager

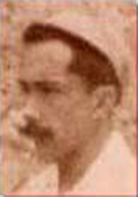

Personal information
- Date of birth: 25 October 1872
- Place of birth: Lisbon, Portugal
- Date of death: 1 January 1944 (aged 71)
- Place of death: Campolide, Lisbon

Managerial career
- Years: Team
- 1904–1908: Sport Lisboa

Manuel Gourlade (25 October 1872 – 1 January 1944) was the first manager of S.L. Benfica and one of driving forces that led to the creation of Sport Lisboa that 4 years later would be known as Sport Lisboa e Benfica.

Gourlade was born in Lisbon, came from a family with money, studied at Colégio Nobre de Carvalho and worked as an employee at Fármacia Franco (a community pharmacy) where a meeting took place for the signing of Sport Lisboa foundation act. He was chosen to do treasury management in the Administrative Board.

He helped funding the club with his own money: the ball bought from Lisbon Cricket Club for 150$ Reais, the translation from English to Portuguese, of the Laws of the game for 2500$ Reais, plus ordered from London, a whistle and another 3 balls. He managed the club for 2 seasons, with a total of 16 games resulting in 8 wins and 8 losses. Later, Cosme Damião replaced him as coach.

He remained close to the club but because all of the expenses he had made for Benfica he took a toll on his finances and died from poverty in Campolide.

== Palmarès ==
Campeonato de Portugal (no lega) Winners (5): 1904, 1905, 1906, 1907, 1908
