= Campo da Feiteira =

Football dirt field in Lisbon, Portugal

Coordinates: 38.751778°N 9.205551°W

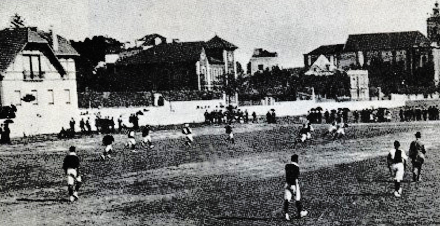
- Interactive map of Campo da Feiteira
- Location: Lisbon, Portugal
- Owner: Private property
- Surface: Dirt
- Record attendance: 8 000 in 23-01-1910 against Carcavelos Club
- Field size: 120m x 79m

Construction
- Opened: 1906
- Closed: 1911
- Cost: 80$

Tenants
- Grupo Sport de Benfica (1907–1908); Grupo Sport Lisboa (1907–1908); Sport Lisboa e Benfica (1908–1911)

Campo da Feiteira was a football dirt field in Lisbon, Portugal. It started as field for Grupo Sport de Benfica to organize Sports Festivals. On 26 May 1907, Grupo Sport de Benfica officially taken over of Quinta da Feiteira, next to Estrada de Benfica, having from now on, a 120 meters per 79 metres field, for $20 a semester. On 14 July 1907 it celebrated here, the first anniversary of Grupo Sport de Benfica.

Grupo Sport Lisboa (GSL) did not have a field in its originating area (Belém) but since some of its members were also members of GSB, they knew about Campo da Feiteira, and despite their quality, it was not used for football. So on 24 November 1907, Grupo Sport Lisboa played for the first time in Campo da Feiteira, even thought as neutral field, counting to the Lisbon Football Championship, Grupo Sport Lisboa beat Internacional (CIF).

In March 1908, Grupo Sport Benfica changes its name to Sport Clube de Benfica. On 13 September 1908, after absorbing its members and the playing field of Grupo Sport Benfica, Grupo Sport Lisboa adds Benfica to its name, becoming then Sport Lisboa e Benfica (SLB) and playing in Campo da Quinta da Feiteira.

Sport Lisboa e Benfica left after excessive rent, $400 for semester. They moved to Campo de Sete Rios.

Campo da Feiteira was converted into houses.

Date	Result	Notes
24 November 1907	GSL 1-0 Clube Internacional Futebol	First match, counting for the Lisbon Football Championship, playing as a neutral field.
25 October 1908	SLB 2-0 Sporting CP	First match as Sport Lisboa e Benfica counting for the Lisbon Football Championship playing as Home team.
10 January 1909	GSL 4-0 Ajudense FC	Record attendance in a Sport event in Portugal: 1,000 people.
23 January 1910	SLB 1-0 Carcavelos Club	Second win against Englishmen Carcavelos Club and record attendance: 8,000 people
22 May 1911	SLB 2-4 Stade Bordelais	Last match at Campo da Feiteira
