= S.L. Benfica =

Association football club in Portugal

Benfica
- Full name: Sport Lisboa e Benfica
- Nicknames: As Águias (The Eagles); Os Encarnados (The Reds); O Glorioso (The Glorious One); Benfiquistas (supporters)
- Short name: SLB
- Founded: 28 February 1904; 122 years ago (as Sport Lisboa)
- Stadium: Estádio da Luz
- Capacity: 68,100
- President: Rui Costa
- Head coach: Marco Silva
- League: Primeira Liga
- 2025–26: Primeira Liga, 3rd of 18
- Website: slbenfica.pt
Home colours	Away colours	Third colours

Sport Lisboa e Benfica (Portuguese pronunciation: [ˈspɔɾ(tɨ) liʒˈβoɐ i βɐ̃jˈfikɐ, sɨˈpor(tɨ)]), commonly known as Benfica, is a professional football club based in Lisbon, Portugal, that competes in the Primeira Liga, the top flight of Portuguese football.

Founded on 28 February 1904, as Sport Lisboa, Benfica is one of the "Big Three" clubs in Portugal that have never been relegated from Primeira Liga, along with rivals Sporting CP and FC Porto. Benfica are nicknamed As Águias (The Eagles), for the symbol atop the club's crest, and Os Encarnados (The Reds), for the shirt colour. Since 2003, their home ground has been the Estádio da Luz, which replaced the original one, larger and built in 1954. Benfica is the most supported Portuguese club and the European club with the highest percentage of supporters in its own country. In 2006, Benfica had an estimated 14 million supporters worldwide, and in February 2025 it reached 400,000 club members, making them the largest sports club in the world by membership at the time. The club's anthem, "Ser Benfiquista", refers to Benfica supporters, who are called benfiquistas. "E pluribus unum" ("Out of many, one") is the club's motto and Águia Vitória is its mascot.

With 91 official major trophies won, Benfica is the most decorated club in Portuguese football. They have won 88 domestic trophies: a record 38 Primeira Liga titles, a record 26 Taça de Portugal, a record 8 Taça da Liga, 10 Supertaça Cândido de Oliveira and 3 Campeonato de Portugal. Internationally, they won the Latin Cup in 1950 and back-to-back European Cups in 1961 and 1962 – both unique feats in Portuguese football – and were runners-up at the Intercontinental Cup in 1961 and '62, at the European Cup in 1963, '65, '68, '88 and '90, and at the UEFA Europa League (formerly the UEFA Cup) in 1983, 2013 and '14. Benfica's ten European finals are a domestic record and ranked seventh all-time among UEFA clubs in 2014. Noncompetitively, Benfica is honoured with the Portuguese Orders of Christ (Commander), of Merit (Officer), and of Prince Henry.

Benfica was voted 12th in FIFA Club of the Century and ranked 9th in the IFFHS Top 200 European clubs of the 20th century. In UEFA, Benfica is 8th in the all-time club ranking and was 20th in the club coefficient rankings at the end of the 2023–24 season. In the UEFA Champions League (formerly the European Cup), Benfica have the second most participations (42) and are the Portuguese club with the most wins (130). In this tournament, they hold the overall record for the biggest aggregate win, achieved in 1965–66. Moreover, Benfica hold the Portuguese record for the most consecutive wins in domestic league (29), where they became the first undefeated champions, in 1972–73.

== History ==
=== 1904–1960 ===
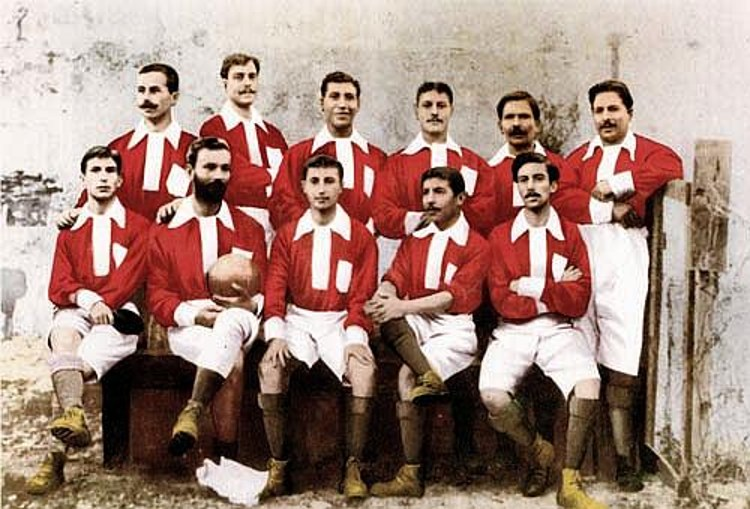
Benfica's first-team in 1905 (Note: From left to right, front to back: António Rosa Rodrigues, Silvestre da Silva (captain), Cândido Rosa Rodrigues, José Rosa Rodrigues, Carlos França (forwards); José da Cruz Viegas (right-back), Manuel Mora (goalkeeper), Fortunato Levy, Albano dos Santos, António Couto (midfielders), Emílio de Carvalho (left-back).)

On 28 February 1904, after a football training session that day, the Catataus Group and members of Associação do Bem met at Farmácia Franco on Rua Direita de Belém with the goal of forming a social and cultural football club called Sport Lisboa, composed of Portuguese players only. Twenty-four people attended the meeting, (Note: Club founders: Abílio Meireles, Amadeu Rocha, António Rosa Rodrigues, António Severino, Cândido Rosa Rodrigues, Carlos França, Cosme Damião, Daniel Brito, Eduardo Corga, Francisco Calisto, Francisco dos Reis Gonçalves, João Gomes, João Goulão, Joaquim Almeida, Joaquim Ribeiro, Jorge Augusto Sousa, Jorge da Costa Afra, José Linhares, José Rosa Rodrigues, Manuel Gourlade, Manuel França, Raul Empis, Henrique Teixeira, Virgílio Cunha.) including Cosme Damião. In that meeting, José Rosa Rodrigues was appointed club president, along with Daniel dos Santos Brito as secretary and Manuel Gourlade as treasurer. The founders decided that the club's colours would be red and white and that the crest would be composed of an eagle, the motto "E pluribus unum" and a football. Sport Lisboa played their first ever match on 1 January 1905, scoring their first goal. Despite important victories, such as the ones against Carcavelos and then-rivals Internacional, the club suffered from poor operating conditions, namely the football dirt field of Terras do Desembargador. As a result, eight players moved to Sporting CP in May 1907, threatening Sport Lisboa's existence, and later starting the rivalry between the two clubs.

On 13 September 1908, Sport Lisboa acquired Grupo Sport Benfica by mutual agreement and changed its name to Sport Lisboa e Benfica. Despite the merger, they continued their respective club operations. For Sport Lisboa, they maintained the football team, the shirt colours, the eagle symbol and the motto. For Grupo Sport Benfica, they maintained the field Campo da Feiteira, the main directors and the club's house. Both clubs determined that the foundation date should coincide with Sport Lisboa's because it was the most recognized club and quite popular in Lisbon due to its football merits. In regard to the crest, a bicycle wheel was added to Sport Lisboa's to represent cycling, the most important sport of Grupo Sport Benfica. Furthermore, the two entities of the newly named club had simultaneous members who helped stabilize operations, which later increased the success of the merger.

However, problems with the club's rented field (Campo da Feiteira) remained. Benfica moved to their first football grass field, Campo de Sete Rios, in 1913. Four years later, after refusing an increase in rent, they relocated to Campo de Benfica. Finally, in 1925, they moved to their own stadium, the Estádio das Amoreiras, playing there fifteen years before moving to the Estádio do Campo Grande in 1940. The Portuguese league began in 1934, and after finishing third in its first edition, Benfica won the next three championships in a row (1935–36, '36–37, '37–38) – the club's first tri, achieved by Lippo Hertzka. Throughout the 1940s, Benfica would win three more Primeira Liga (1941–42, '42–43, '44–45) and four Taça de Portugal (1940, '43, '44, '49), with coach János Biri achieving the first double (dobradinha) for the club in 1943.

Benfica's first international success happened in 1950, when they won the Latin Cup (the only Portuguese club to do so), defeating Bordeaux with a golden goal from Julinho at the Estádio Nacional in Lisbon, with Ted Smith as coach. It was the first international trophy won by a Portuguese club. They reached another final of the competition in 1957 but lost to Real Madrid at the Santiago Bernabéu. With the election of president Joaquim Ferreira Bogalho in 1952 and the arrival of coach Otto Glória in 1954, Benfica became more modernized and professional and moved into the original Estádio da Luz, with an initial seating capacity of 40,000; expanded to 70,000 in 1960. During the 1950s, Benfica won three Primeira Liga titles (1949–50, '54–55, '56–57) and six Taça de Portugal (1951, '52, '53, '55, '57, '59). Despite being Portuguese champions in 1955, Benfica were not invited to the inaugural European Cup by the organizers, thus making their UEFA debut in 1957–58 against Sevilla.

=== 1960–2003 ===
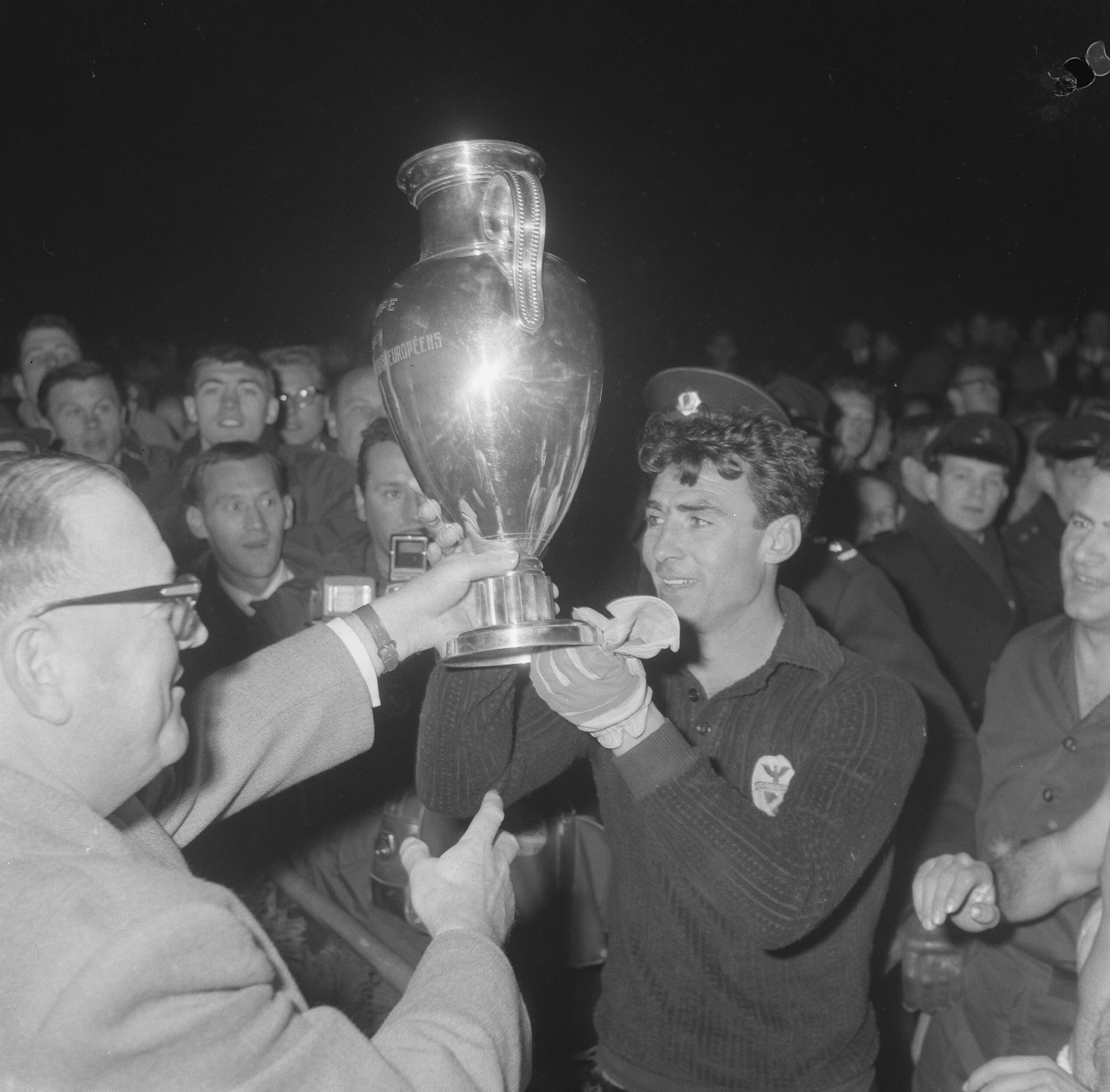
Costa Pereira (right) holding Benfica's second European Cup after the final victory

Led by coach Béla Guttmann, who had been signed by Maurício Vieira de Brito, Benfica became back-to-back European Champions by winning the European Cup against Barcelona in 1961 (3–2) and Real Madrid in 1962 (5–3). Consequently, Benfica played in the Intercontinental Cup, where they were runners-up to Peñarol in 1961 and Santos in 1962. Later on, Benfica reached three more European Cup finals, losing them to AC Milan in 1963, Inter Milan in 1965, and Manchester United in 1968. Therefore, for their international performance, Benfica were ranked first in European football in 1965, '66 and '69, and were presented with the France Football European Team of the Year award in 1968. In the 1960s, Benfica won eight Primeira Liga (1959–60, '60–61, '62–63, '63–64, '64–65, '66–67, '67–68, '68–69), three Taça de Portugal (1962, '64, '69) and two European Cups (1960–61, '61–62). Many of these successes were achieved with Eusébio – the only player to win the Ballon d'Or for a Portuguese club – Coluna, José Águas, José Augusto, Simões, Torres, and others, who formed the 1963–64 team that set a club record of 103 goals in 26 league matches.

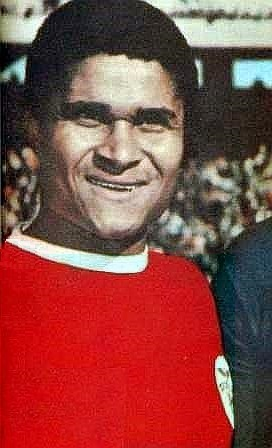
Eusébio, winner of the 1965 Ballon d'Or

During the 1970s, with president Borges Coutinho, Benfica continued dominating Portuguese football, as they won six Primeira Liga titles (1970–71, '71–72, '72–73, '74–75, '75–76, '76–77) and two Taça de Portugal (1970, '72). In 1971–72, Benfica reached the semi-finals of the European Cup, where they were eliminated by Ajax of Johan Cruyff. Managed by Jimmy Hagan the following season, Benfica became the first club in Portugal to win the league without defeat, winning 28 matches – 23 consecutively – out of 30, and drawing 2. They scored 101 goals, and Eusébio was again crowned Europe's top scorer, 2 goals short of his record (42). From October 1976 to September 1978, Benfica were unbeaten in the league for 56 matches. This decade was also marked by Benfica's admission of foreign players into the team, becoming the last Portuguese club to do so, in 1979.

In the 1980s, Benfica continued to thrive domestically. With Lajos Baróti in 1980–81, Benfica became the first club to win all Portuguese trophies in one season: Supertaça de Portugal, Primeira Liga and Taça de Portugal. Later, under the guidance of Sven-Göran Eriksson, they won two consecutive Primeira Liga (1982–83, '83–84), one Taça de Portugal (1983) and reached the final of the UEFA Cup in 1983, lost to Anderlecht. Following improvements to the Estádio da Luz, Benfica opened the stadium's third tier in 1985, transforming it into the largest stadium in Europe and third largest in the world. A season later, after they had won the domestic Super Cup in 1985 and the Portuguese Cup in 1986, Benfica clinched the double of Primeira Liga and Taça de Portugal. Then, from 1988 to 1994, Benfica won three Primeira Liga (1988–89, '90–91, '93–94), one Taça de Portugal (1993), one Super Cup (1989) and reached the European Cup finals of 1988 and 1990, won by PSV Eindhoven and AC Milan respectively.

Financial trouble in the early 1980s and a large investment on players throughout that decade started to deteriorate the club's finances under Jorge de Brito's presidency. The rampant spending and a questionable signing policy (over 100 players during Manuel Damásio's term) further aggravated the problem. Soon after, with president João Vale e Azevedo, Benfica was in huge debt and sometimes unable to pay taxes and player salaries. From 1994 to 2003, Benfica had eleven coaches, won the 1995–96 Taça de Portugal, suffered their biggest defeat in European competitions, 7–0 to Celta de Vigo in 1999, had their lowest ever league finish, a sixth place in 2000–01, and were absent from European competition in 2001–02 and '02–03, the first time since 1958–59. Back in 2000, club members had approved the construction of the new Estádio da Luz shortly after the election of Manuel Vilarinho.

=== 2003–present ===
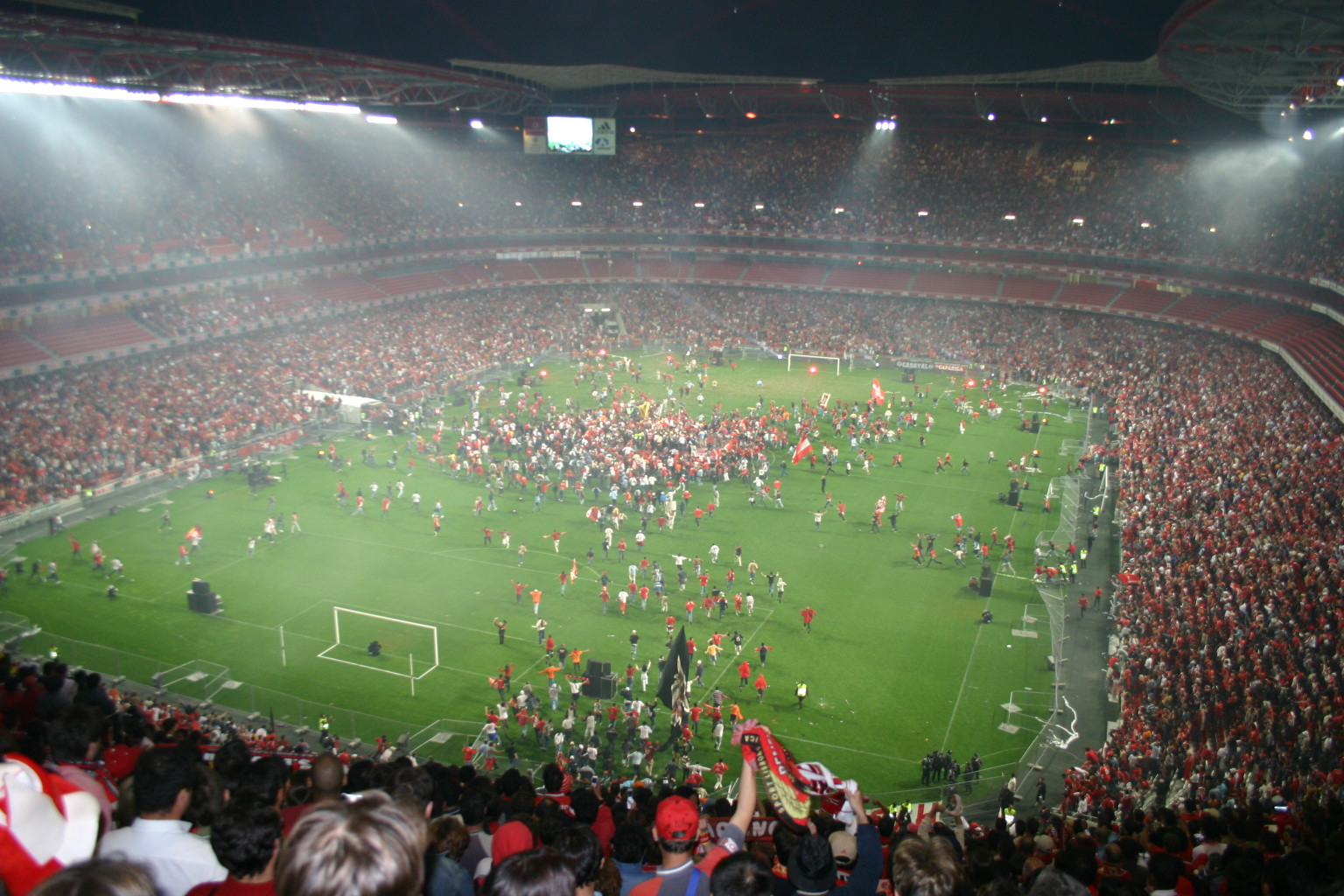
Celebration of the 2004–05 league title at the Estádio da Luz

In 2003–04, with president Luís Filipe Vieira, Benfica ended their longest silverware drought by winning the Taça de Portugal. The following year, Benfica won their first league title since 1994, and the Supertaça Cândido de Oliveira. After that and until 2009, when Benfica won their first Taça da Liga – thus becoming the first club to win all major Portuguese competitions – they did not win any trophies and finished fourth in the 2007–08 league. In Europe, Benfica had three consecutive appearances in the group stage of the UEFA Champions League, with their best result being a quarter-final stage in 2005–06 after eliminating then European champions Liverpool on 3–0 aggregate.

For 2009–10, Jorge Jesus was appointed coach, a position he held until 2015. During that six-season span, Benfica won 10 domestic trophies, including an unprecedented treble in Portuguese football (league, cup and league cup) in 2013–14 and the club's first back-to-back league titles since 1984. At international level, Benfica were ranked sixth in the UEFA team ranking in 2015 due to their first European semi-final in 17 years at the 2010–11 Europa League, an appearance in the Champions League quarter-finals in the 2011–12 campaign, and two consecutive Europa League finals, in 2012–13 and '13–14.

Later managed by Rui Vitória, Benfica won a fourth Primeira Liga title in a row – their first ever tetra – one Taça de Portugal, one Taça da Liga and two successive Super Cup trophies; the latter in 2017 after they reachieved a 36-year-old treble. Internationally, a year after they had consecutively reached the Champions League knockout phase for the first time in their history, Benfica suffered their biggest loss in the competition, 5–0 to Basel, and went on setting the worst Portuguese group stage campaign.

Following negative results in 2018–19, coach Bruno Lage led Benfica to their 37th champions title while achieving the league's all-time best second round. Later on, after thrashing Sporting CP in the Super Cup, Jesus returned for 2020–21 as part of the biggest spending in Portuguese football, amid the COVID-19 pandemic; they were eliminated in the Champions League third qualifying round, lost a Super Cup match, finished third in the league, and lost a Portuguese Cup final for a second time in a row. From 2021–22 to '22–23, with president Rui Costa, Benfica lost a league cup final for the first time and were third in the league before coach Roger Schmidt led them to their 38th league title and a second consecutive place in the Champions League quarter-finals. From then on, Benfica would only win the 2023 Super Cup and the league cup and super cup in 2025, the year they debuted at the FIFA Club World Cup.

== Crest and shirt ==
Period	Kit manufacturer	Main sponsor
1904–1970	Benfica	—
1971–1972	Lacoste	—
1972–1976	Benfica	—
1977–1984	Adidas	—
1984–1987	Adidas	Shell
1987–1990	Adidas	FNAC
1990–1992	Hummel	FNAC
1992–1994	Hummel	Casino Estoril
1994–1996	Olympic	Parmalat
1996–1997	Olympic	Telecel
1997–2000	Adidas	Telecel
2000–2001	Adidas	Netc
2001–2005	Adidas	Telecel/Vodafone
2005–2009	Adidas	PT/TMN
2010–2013	Adidas	TMN/MEO
2013–2015	Adidas	MEO/Moche
2015–present	Adidas	Emirates

Benfica's crest is composed of an eagle, as a symbol of independence, authority and nobility, positioned atop a shield with red and white colours, symbolizing bravery and peace respectively; the motto "E pluribus unum" ("Out of many, one"), defining union between all members; and the club's initials, "SLB", over a football – all this superimposed on a bicycle wheel representing one of the club's first sports, cycling.

The club has had four main crests since its inception in 1904. The origin of the current crest goes back to 1908, when Sport Lisboa absorbed Grupo Sport Benfica. Afterwards, the shape of the crest was changed in 1930 and 1999. The most significant of the latest changes were the modification and repositioning of the eagle and the reduction of the wheel's size.

Since the 2008–09 season, Benfica football shirts have displayed three stars above the crest, with each star representing ten league titles won by the club. In 2010–11 and 2011–12, however, the shirts displayed commemorative crests with one and two stars respectively, the former in the 50-year celebration of their first European Cup and the latter to celebrate their second consecutive European Cup.

On 31 October 2026, president Rui Costa presented an updated version of the badge at a general assembly, to come into effect immediately and be adopted in the different operations of the club during the 2026-27. The new version would approach the identity to that prior to 1999 with two major changes being applied, in accordance with Article 8 of Benfica's statutes - the cycling wheel rim and spikes are changed to gold and the eagle crowning the badge is once again perched atop the banner, holding it, rather than placed on the wheel.

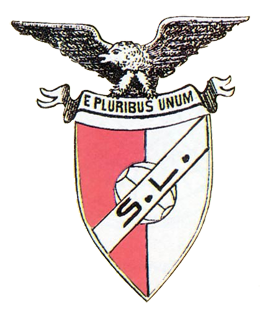
1904–1908
(Sport Lisboa)

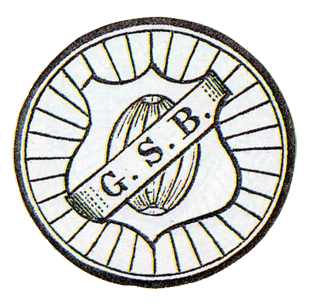
1906–1908
(Grupo Sport Benfica)

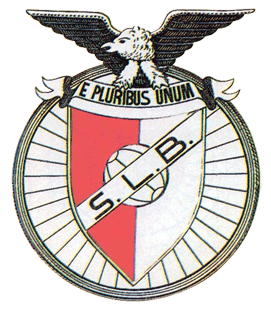
1908–1930

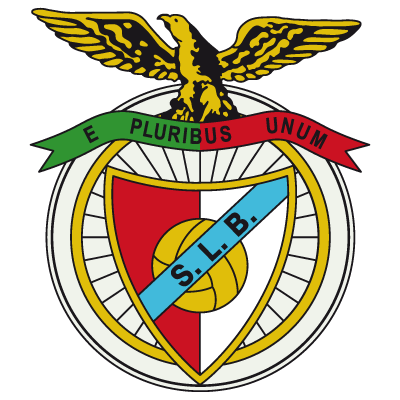
1930–1999

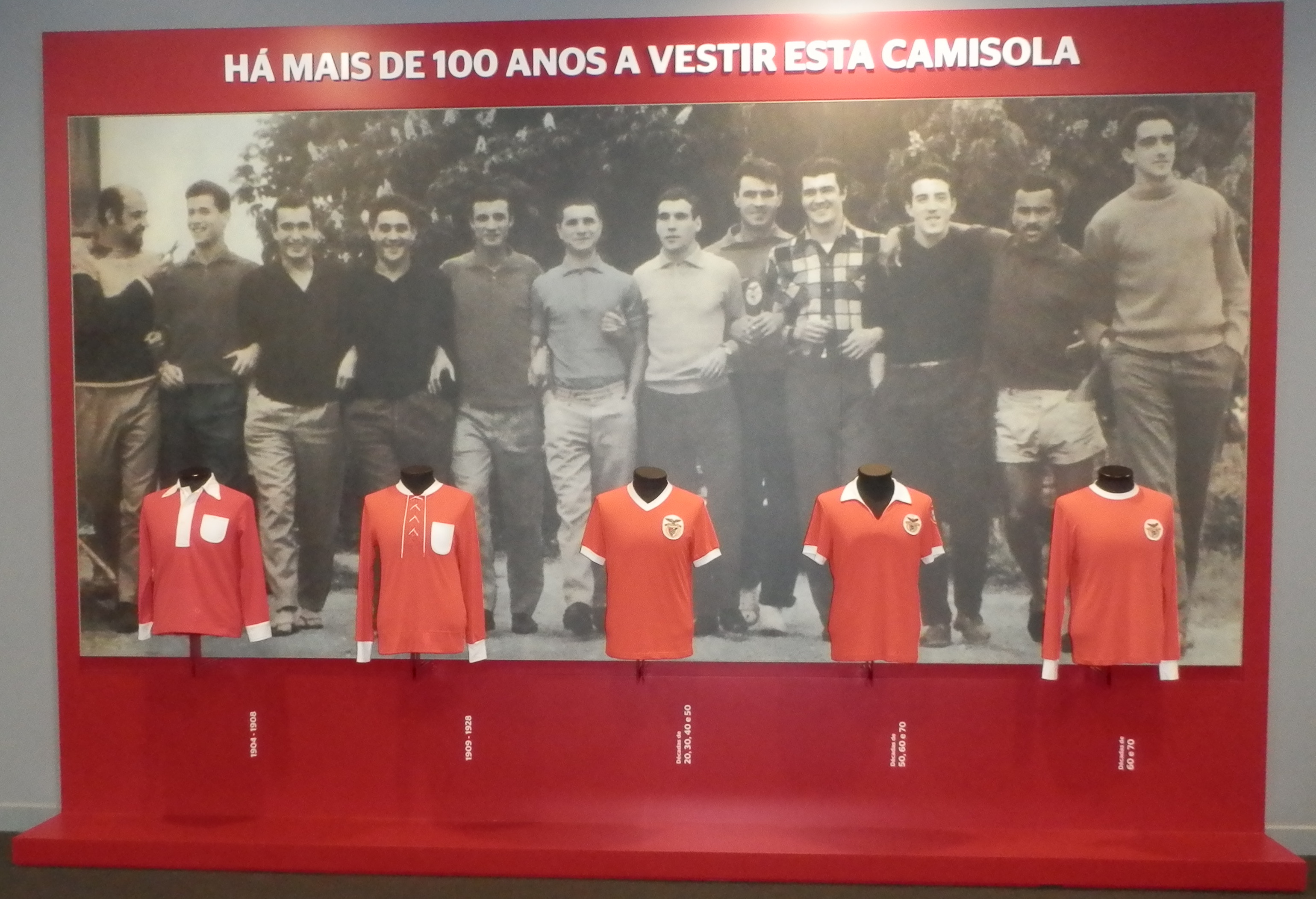
Evolution of the Benfica shirt from 1904 until the 1970s

José da Cruz Viegas was the person responsible for the selection of Benfica's kit in 1904. Red and white colours were chosen for being the ones that stood out better to players' eyes. One year after its inception, the club opted for red shirts with white collars, pockets and cuffs, combined with white shorts and black socks. Benfica's white alternative kit was officially used for the first time in 1944–45, when Salgueiros, who also wore red, were promoted to the first division.

Benfica have always worn red shirts; for that reason, in Portugal, Benfica and their supporters (benfiquistas) were nicknamed Vermelhos (Reds). This changed in 1936 with the start of the Spanish Civil War: the Portuguese Estado Novo's Censorship Commission censored the word "vermelhos" because the Popular Front communists in Spain were also known by that name. From then on, Benfica became known as Encarnados – word similar to "reds", but with a different connotation.

== Grounds ==
During the club's first decades, Benfica played mostly on rented fields. Their first own stadium was the Estádio das Amoreiras, built and opened in 1925, where they played until 1940. A year later, they moved to the Estádio do Campo Grande, a rented municipal stadium, before relocating to their second home ground thirteen years later.

From 1954 to 2003, Benfica played at the Estádio da Luz in Lisbon, the largest stadium in Europe and third largest in the world in terms of capacity – 120,000 – from 1985 to 1987. It was demolished between 2002 and 2003, and the new Estádio da Luz was finalized in 2003, with a construction cost of €162 million, roughly €25 million more than planned.

Like its predecessor, the Estádio da Luz is officially named Estádio do Sport Lisboa e Benfica. A UEFA category four stadium, it hosted several matches of UEFA Euro 2004, including the final, and was the venue for the UEFA Champions League finals in 2014 and 2020. Built with a seating capacity of 65,647, the stadium currently has 68,100 seats.

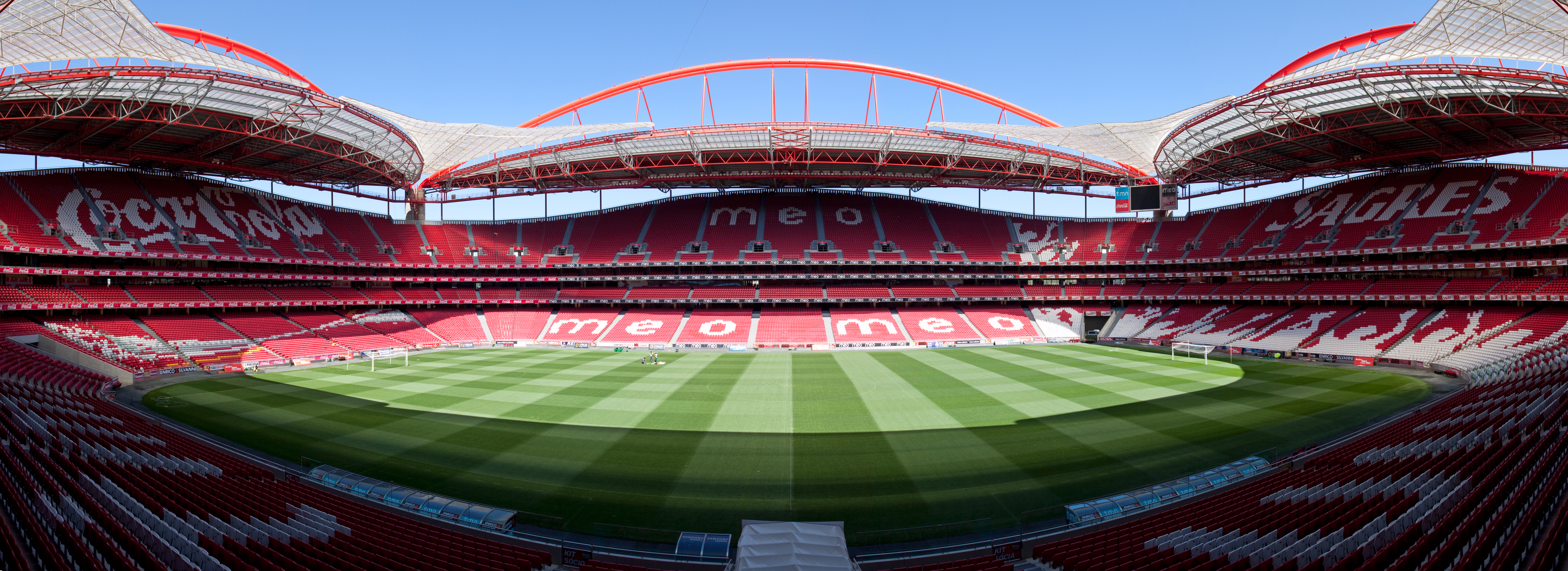
A panorama of Benfica's home ground, Estádio da Luz, on 30 July 2009

=== Training centre ===
Benfica's training ground and youth academy, Benfica Campus, is located in Seixal, Lisbon Region. It was built in 2005 and opened on 22 September 2006.

== Support ==
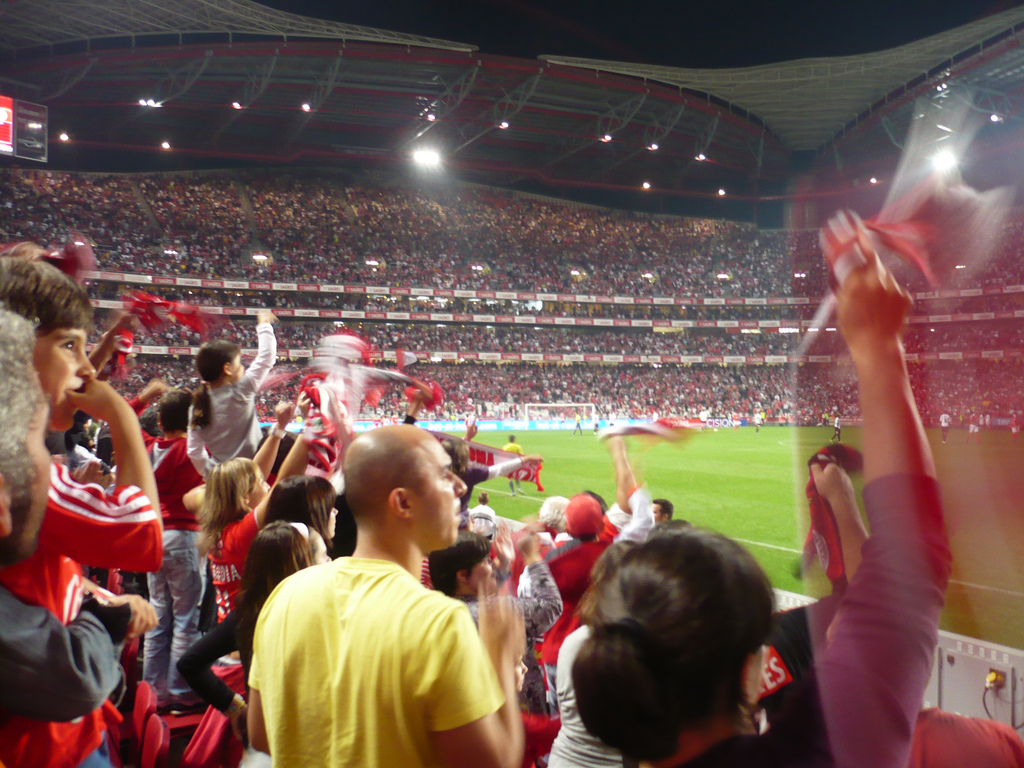
Benfiquistas celebrating a goal at the Estádio da Luz (2009)

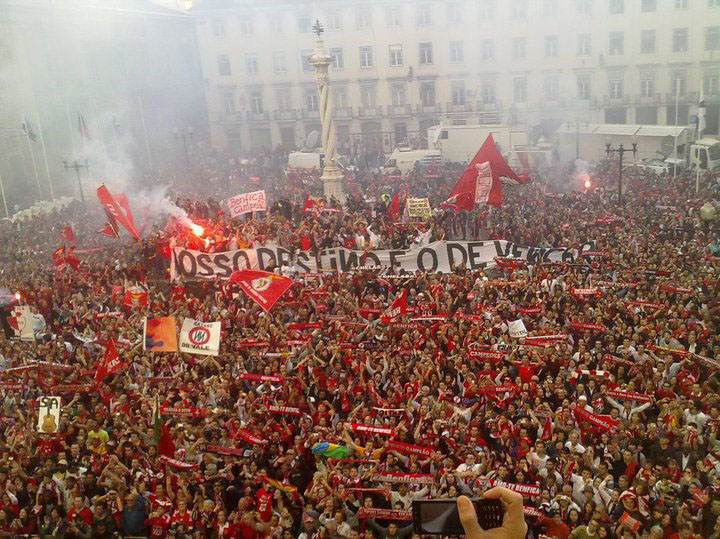
Benfica's 2009–10 league title celebration at the Lisbon City Hall

The supporters of Benfica are known as benfiquistas. They sing the club's anthem at the start of every home match and sometimes during the match. They call the club O Glorioso (The Glorious One), hence the chant "Glorioso SLB". In some countries, since 1952, Benfica has had supporters' clubs known as Casas do Benfica (Benfica houses), places for cultural, social and sport interaction among benfiquistas. In recent years, benfiquistas have celebrated league titles with the team at the Marquis of Pombal Square in Lisbon.

Benfica is the most popular club in Portugal and has always been seen as the working-class club of Portugal. According to a study published in 2006 by professors Luís Reto and Jorge de Sá, with the stamp of approval by Instituto Nacional de Estatística and Secretaria de Estado das Comunidades, Benfica has approximately 14 million supporters worldwide: over 5.5 million in Europe (4.7 in Portugal); over 6 million in Mozambique (3.8) and Angola (2.7); over 1 million in the United States and Canada; and the remainder in Brazil, Venezuela, the Caribbean, Indochina, China, Australia, and India. According to a study performed for UEFA in 2012, Benfica is the European club with the highest share of football supporters in its own country (47%).

In the 2022–23 season, Benfica had an average home attendance of 57,108 in the Portuguese league, the highest average of the competition and current record at the Estádio da Luz, with an average occupancy of 89.12%. The highest home attendance record was set in 2016–17; 64,519 spectators saw Benfica's 5–0 win over Vitória de Guimarães in the season's last match at Da Luz.

=== Members ===
The members of Benfica (sócios), along with club affiliates, elect the club president and other governing bodies for a four-year term by voting in each candidate list. Members may also participate and vote in other general assemblies, submit proposals, take part in discussions, be elected to governing bodies, be designated for positions or functions at the club, and so forth. A member (effective or corresponding) is entitled to a number of votes depending on membership years: over 1 year and up to 5 years, 3 votes; over 5 and up to 10, 10 votes; over 10 and up to 25, 20 votes; over 25, 50 votes. An affiliated club (e.g. Benfica de Luanda) is entitled to 20 votes.

In 2003, the club implemented mandatory electronic voting, a voting method that has been criticized by members of Benfica, including presidential candidates, and outsiders. In 2025, new statutes were approved by 91% of the votes of 8241 members. Notable changes include: optional electronic voting; separate lists; a second-round election if necessary; remuneration of board members; a maximum of three consecutive mandates per governing body; minimum requirements of 15 years of continuous membership as an effective member and age of 35 for candidates to preside over a governing body; new elections in case an annual report is voted down twice; removal of votes from Benfica Houses.

On 9 November 2006, Benfica set the Guinness World Record for "the most widely supported football club", with 160,398 paid-up members. In 2014, according to a study by Movimento Por Um Futebol Melhor, Benfica had 270,000 members and was the biggest club in the world in membership terms. On 31 March 2015, Benfica reported having 246,401 members. After a scheduled renumbering (done at least every ten years) by the club in August 2015, the number decreased to 156,916. By 9 October 2021, Benfica had over 250,000 members, of which 115,681 were eligible to vote in club elections that day. With 400,000 members in February 2025, Benfica became once again the largest sports club in the world by membership.

=== Rivalries ===
Benfica has rivalries with Sporting CP and FC Porto, with whom it forms the "Big Three", Portugal's most decorated clubs. None of them have been relegated from the Portuguese league since its establishment in 1934.

As Lisbon-based clubs, Benfica and Sporting have shared a rivalry for over a century; it all started in 1907, when eight prominent Benfica players defected to Sporting. Any match between both teams is known as dérbi de Lisboa ("Lisbon derby"), dérbi eterno ("eternal derby"), dérbi da Segunda Circular, or dérbi dos dérbis ("derby of the derbies"). It is the most important football derby in Portugal and is followed in Europe, Africa, the Americas, and wherever the Portuguese diaspora is.

The rivalry between Benfica and FC Porto, which started with a friendly match on 28 April 1912, comes about as Lisbon and Porto are the largest Portuguese cities, respectively. Benfica and Porto are the two most decorated clubs in Portuguese football, with Benfica currently being the most decorated team overall. Any match between the two sides is called O Clássico (The Classic).

== Media ==
Benfica TV logo

In 2008, Benfica launched its own sports-oriented television network, Benfica TV (BTV for short), the first channel by a Portuguese club, and has operated it since. Its premium channel broadcasts Benfica's live matches at home in the Primeira Liga, Benfica B home matches in the LigaPro, under-19 team home matches, and the club's other sports matches, including youth categories. Until 2016, it broadcast three seasons of the English Premier League, and one season of the Italian Serie A and French Ligue 1. In January 2020, Benfica launched Benfica Play (BPlay for short), an over-the-top media service featuring exclusive content such as interviews with current and former Benfica players and behind-the-scenes video from matchdays and training sessions.

Moreover, the club publishes the weekly newspaper O Benfica every Friday since 28 November 1942. It contains information about everything in the club in the form of news and articles (mostly the former). By 2005, it had a circulation of close to 10,000. From 6 December 2007 to 11 July 2017, Benfica published the quarterly magazine Mística. Free of charge for Benfica members, it comprised interviews with players and personnel of the club, reports about the club's history and recent events, news, opinion pieces, overviews of the club's sports, with football being its main focus, and a section dedicated to club members. Its last edition, number 33, had a circulation of 115,602 in mainland Portugal. O Benfica Ilustrado was the club's first magazine; it was launched on 1 October 1957 as a monthly supplement to the newspaper O Benfica.

== Museum ==
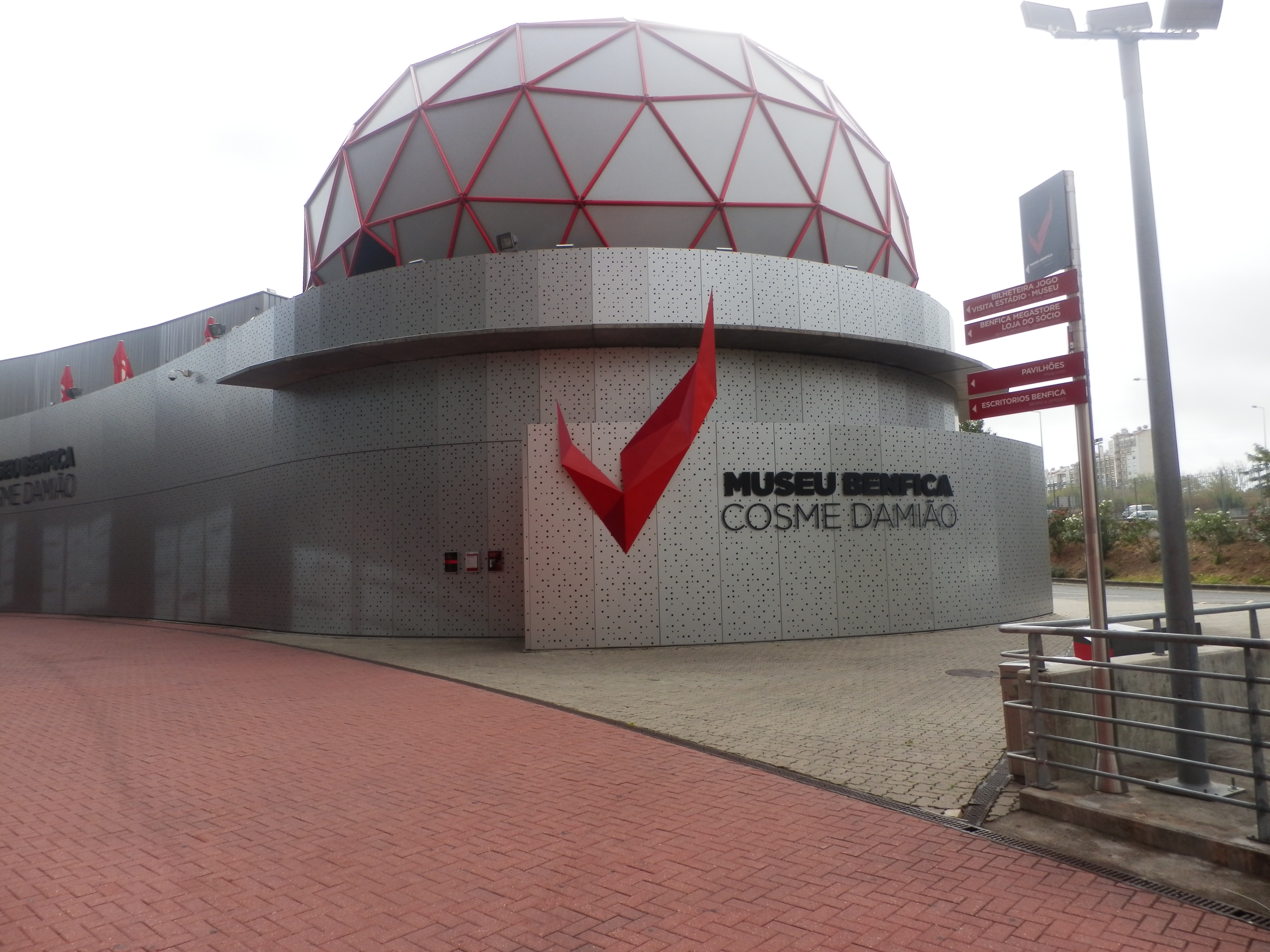
The entrance to Museu Benfica

The Museu Benfica – Cosme Damião, located near the stadium, was inaugurated on 26 July 2013 and opened to the public three days later. Named after Cosme Dasmião, one of the club's founders, it was considered the Best Portuguese Museum of 2014 by the Portuguese Association of Museology.

== Finances and ownership ==
On 10 February 2000, under the presidency of João Vale e Azevedo, Benfica created Sport Lisboa e Benfica – Futebol, SAD (a public limited sports company) with an initial equity of €75 million. There were five major reasons for creating an autonomous entity to manage the Benfica team: participation in professional football competitions at domestic and international level; development of football players; exploitation of TV rights on open and closed channels; management of the players' image rights; exploitation of the Benfica brand by the professional football team and at sporting events.

Benfica SAD entered the PSI-20 on 21 May 2007 with an initial stock value of €5 on 15,000,001 shares. Later in June that year, Joe Berardo launched an unsuccessful takeover bid of €3.50 per share for 60% of Benfica SAD. Following the general assembly of 23 December 2009, the SAD increased its €75 million equity to €115 million by absorbing Benfica Estádio, to come out of technical insolvency.

On 31 July 2014, the SAD completed the acquisition of Benfica Stars Fund by spending roughly €28.9 million for 85% of units, thus purchasing the remaining economic rights of nine players. Later in April, Benfica and Adidas renewed their previous ten-season contract of 2003 until 2021, for around €4.5 million per year. In May 2015, the airline Emirates signed a three-year sponsorship deal worth up to €30 million to become Benfica's main jersey sponsor. Then in December, Benfica sold the TV rights of their first-team home matches as well as Benfica TV's broadcasting and distribution rights to NOS in a three-year deal, receiving €40 million per season, with the option to extend the contract to a maximum of ten seasons, totalling €400 million. Days later, Luís Filipe Vieira said the money from the latter contract would be used to lower Benfica's debt.

By June 2017, Benfica had earned €617 million from player transfers since the 2010–11 season, more than any other club in the world. In September 2018, Benfica SAD reported a profit of €20.6 million and a revenue of €206.2 million. Moreover, they reported a record equity of €86.8 million: assets of €485.1 million and liabilities of €398.3 million. It was the first time since 2010–11 that the debt was below €400 million. In January 2019, Benfica remained the only Portuguese club ever to appear in the Deloitte Football Money League, being ranked as the world's 30th highest commercial revenue generating football club in 2017–18, with a revenue of €150.7 million. In May 2019, Benfica was ranked by Brand Finance as the 40th most valuable football brand.

In May 2020, the Portuguese Securities Market Commission denied Benfica's takeover bid of 28.06% of Benfica SAD for €5 a share because the funding source was the SAD itself. By September 2021, Benfica owned the majority of the SAD's share capital, 63.65%, of which 40% belonged directly to the club, holder of all category A shares, and 23.65% to its holding company, Benfica SGPS, holder of category B shares. The remaining percentage pertains to shareholders who may only own B shares.

In May 2025, United States-based company Lenore Sports Partners acquired a 5.24% minority stake in Benfica SAD. A market filing indicated the shares included stock previously seized from former president Luís Filipe Vieira and auctioned, with the transaction notified to Portugal's CMVM securities regulator.

== Players ==
=== Current squad ===
As of 11 September 2026

Note: Flags indicate national team as defined under FIFA eligibility rules; some limited exceptions apply. Players may hold more than one non-FIFA nationality.

No.	Pos.	Nation	Player
1	GK	UKR	Anatoliy Trubin
2	DF	FRA	Clément Lenglet (on loan from Atlético Madrid)
3	DF	AUS	Alessandro Circati
5	MF	ARG	Enzo Barrenechea
6	DF	DEN	Alexander Bah
8	MF	NOR	Fredrik Aursnes (captain)
10	MF	UKR	Heorhiy Sudakov
11	FW	BEL	Dodi Lukébakio
13	MF	POL	Jakub Kamiński
14	FW	GRE	Vangelis Pavlidis
16	MF	POR	Manu Silva
18	MF	LUX	Leandro Barreiro
21	FW	NOR	Andreas Schjelderup
22	FW	COL	Jhon Durán (on loan from Al-Nassr)

No.	Pos.	Nation	Player
24	GK	POR	Samuel Soares
25	FW	ARG	Gianluca Prestianni
26	DF	SWE	Samuel Dahl
27	MF	POR	Rafa Silva
30	MF	ARG	Claudio Echeverri (on loan from Manchester City)
33	DF	BRA	Gabriel Índio
34	DF	MAR	Souffian El Karouani (on loan from Al-Qadsiah)
36	MF	POR	João Palhinha
44	DF	POR	Tomás Araújo (vice-captain)
50	GK	POR	Diogo Ferreira
58	DF	POR	Daniel Banjaqui
62	DF	POR	José Neto
72	FW	POR	Anísio Cabral

=== Out on loan ===
Note: Flags indicate national team as defined under FIFA eligibility rules; some limited exceptions apply. Players may hold more than one non-FIFA nationality.

No.	Pos.	Nation	Player
9	FW	CRO	Franjo Ivanović (at Lens until 30 June 2027)
20	MF	COL	Richard Ríos (at Al-Ittihad until 30 June 2027)
47	FW	POR	Tiago Gouveia (at Gençlerbirliği until 30 June 2027)
66	DF	USA	Joshua Wynder (at New England Revolution until 30 June 2027)

No.	Pos.	Nation	Player
68	MF	POR	João Veloso (at Moreirense until 30 June 2027)
84	MF	POR	João Rego (at Casa Pia until 30 June 2027)
86	MF	POR	Diogo Prioste (at Gil Vicente until 30 June 2027)
—	DF	ESP	Rafael Obrador (at Sassuolo until 30 June 2027)

=== Retired numbers ===
No.	Player	Position	Benfica debut	Last match
29	(Hungary) Miklós Fehér	FW	24 August 2002	25 January 2004

On 27 January 2004, Benfica retired squad number 29 in memory of Miklós Fehér, who had died while playing for them two days earlier.

== Personnel ==
=== Coaching staff ===
Position	Name
Head coach	Marco Silva
Assistant coaches	Ricardo Rocha; Gonçalo Pedro; Francisco Costa
Goalkeeper coach	Fernando Ferreira
Fitness coach	
Head of performance	Bruno Mendes
Analyst coaches	Roberto Merella; Rúben Soares

=== Management ===
Position	Name
President	Rui Costa
Vice-presidents	Nuno Catarino; Humberto Coelho; Domingos D'Almeida Lima; Manuel Henriques de Brito; José Francisco Gandarez; Tomás Barroso; Mónica Sabrosa; José Martinez Taboada
General assembly president	José Pereira da Costa
Supervisory board president	Raul Martins
Remunerations committee president	Eduardo Stock da Cunha

== Records and statistics ==
=== Individual ===
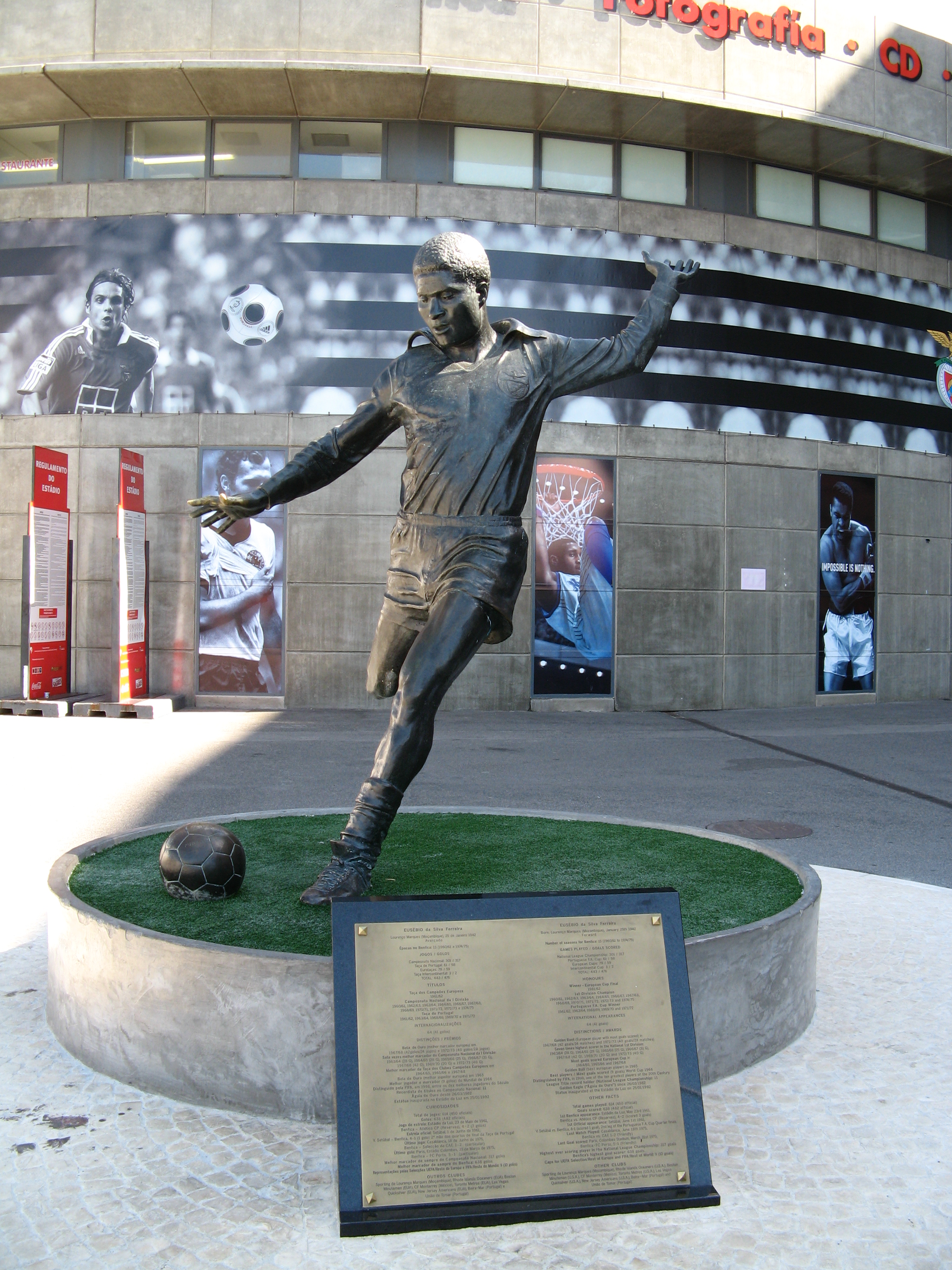
Statue of Benfica's all-time top scorer, Eusébio (473 goals)

Nené is the Benfica player with the most official appearances (575). Eusébio is the club's all-time top goalscorer, with 473 goals in 440 competitive matches. He is also Benfica's top scorer in UEFA club competitions, with 56 goals. Luisão is the player with the most trophies won (20), the captain with the most matches and has the most appearances in European matches.

Cosme Damião is the longest-serving coach (18 consecutive years). Otto Glória is the coach with the most league titles won (4) and the most trophies won (9) before the advent of the league cup. Jorge Jesus is the coach with the most trophies won (10: 3 leagues, 1 cup, 5 league cups, 1 super cup). Rui Vitória is the coach with the highest percentage of wins in the domestic league with a minimum 34 matches played (85.29%).

=== Collective ===
Benfica became the first team in Portuguese league history to complete two seasons without defeat, namely the 1972–73 and '77–78 seasons. In the former, as unbeaten champions, they achieved two records: 58 points in 30 matches, the most ever obtained (96.7% efficiency), and the largest difference of points ever between champions and runners-up (18 points) in a two-points-per-win system. In the 2015–16 campaign, Benfica amassed 88 points in 34 matches and set the club's points record since the league is contested by 18 teams. Benfica's record for the lowest number of goals conceded in the Primeira Liga was achieved in 1988–89 with coach Toni: 15 goals in 38 matches.

Furthermore, Benfica hold the European records for the most consecutive wins in domestic league (29), between 1971–72 and '72–73, and the longest unbeaten run in all competitions since the advent of European competition – 48 matches from December 1963 to 14 February 1965. The latter record ranks third overall.

In the 1965–66 European Cup, Benfica scored 18 goals against Stade Dudelange and achieved the highest goal margin on aggregate in European Cup and their biggest win in UEFA competitions. In the UEFA Europa League, Benfica was the first club to reach two finals consecutively, the latter without defeat. As of the 2022–23 season, Benfica have 42 appearances in the UEFA Champions League (formerly the European Cup) and 21 participations in the UEFA Europa League (formerly the UEFA Cup). Additionally, they have appearances in now-defunct competitions: 7 in the UEFA Cup Winners' Cup and 2 in the Intercontinental Cup. By October 2017, Benfica were the 5th highest-scoring team in UEFA competition history, with 655 goals in 405 matches (1.62 per match).

=== Recent seasons ===
Benfica's season-by-season performance over the last ten completed seasons:

Season	Pos	Pld	W	D	L	GF	GA	Pts	Top league scorer	Goals	Top overall scorer	Goals	TP	TL	ST	UCL	UEL	Rnk	References
2016–17	1st	34	25	7	2	72	18	82	Kostas Mitroglou	16	Kostas Mitroglou	27	W	SF	W	R16	—	9th	
2017–18	2nd	34	25	6	3	80	22	81	Jonas	34	Jonas	37	5R	3R	W	GS	—	15th	
2018–19	1st	34	28	3	3	103	31	87	Haris Seferovic	23	Haris Seferovic	27	SF	SF	—	GS	QF	21st	
2019–20	2nd	34	24	5	5	71	26	77	Carlos Vinícius	19	Pizzi	30	RU	3R	W	GS	R32	20th	
2020–21	3rd	34	23	7	4	69	27	76	Haris Seferovic	22	Haris Seferovic	26	RU	SF	RU	3Q	R32	24th	
2021–22	3rd	34	23	5	6	78	30	74	Darwin Núñez	26	Darwin Núñez	34	5R	RU	—	QF	—	26th	
2022–23	1st	34	28	3	3	82	20	87	Gonçalo Ramos	19	Gonçalo Ramos	27	QF	GS	—	QF	—	17th	
2023–24	2nd	34	25	5	4	77	28	80	Rafa Silva	14	Rafa Silva	22	SF	SF	W	GS	QF	20th	
2024–25	2nd	34	25	5	4	84	28	80	Vangelis Pavlidis	19	Vangelis Pavlidis	30	RU	W	—	R16	—	15th	
2025–26	3rd	34	23	11	0	74	25	80	Vangelis Pavlidis	22	Vangelis Pavlidis	30	QF	SF	W	KPO	—	14th	

Key

W = Winners; RU = Runners-up; SF = Semi-finals; QF = Quarter-finals; R16 = Round of 16; R32 = Round of 32; KPO = Knockout play-offs; GS = Group stage; 3R = Third round; 5R = Fifth round; 3Q = Third qualifying round

== Honours ==
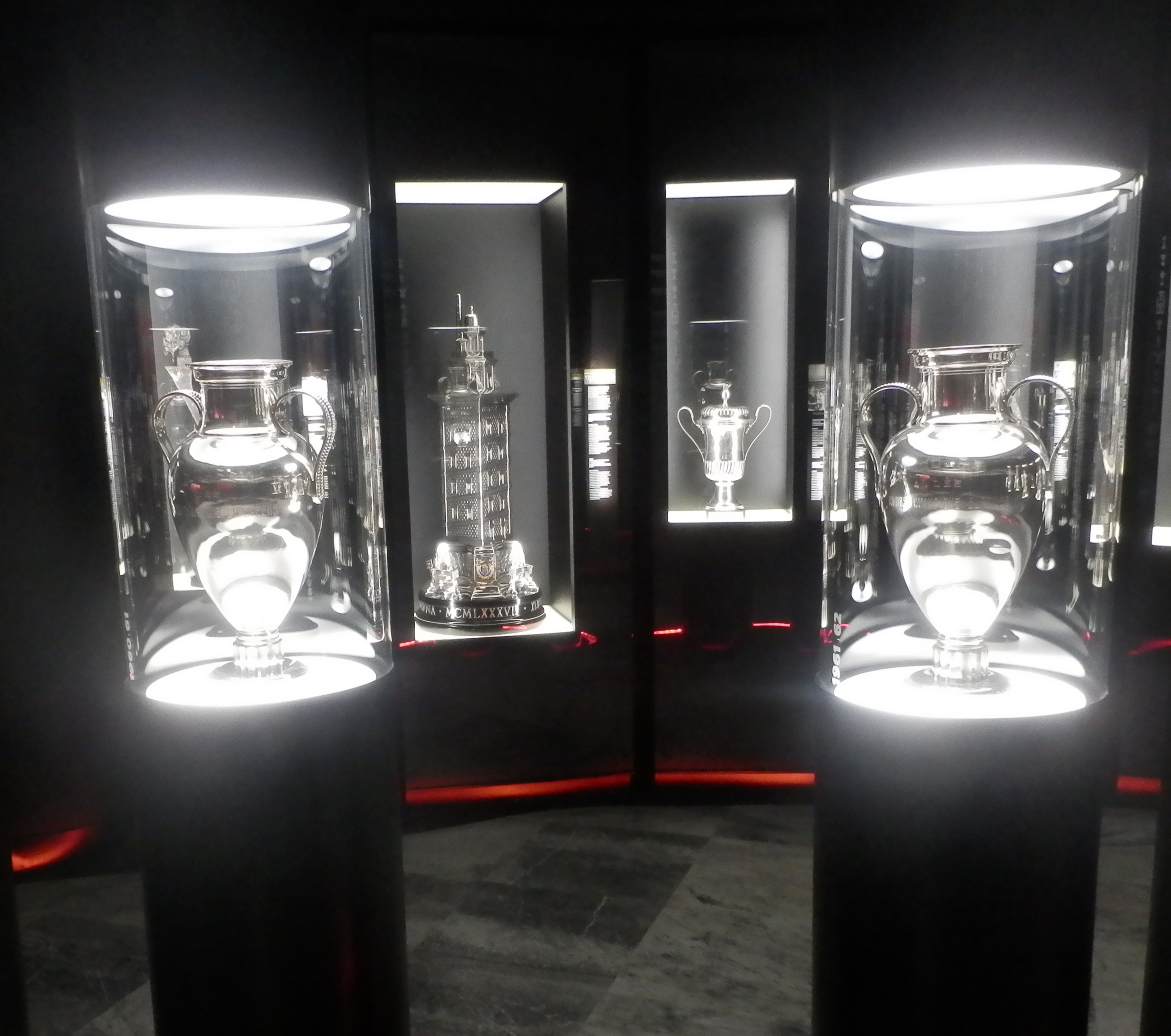
Benfica's two European Cups (front) at Museu Benfica – Cosme Damião

Benfica have won a record 38 Primeira Liga, a record 26 Taça de Portugal (including a record 4 consecutively), a record 8 Taça da Liga (including a record 4 consecutively), 10 Supertaça Cândido de Oliveira and 3 Campeonato de Portugal (including a record 2 consecutively) – totalling 85 domestic trophies. Internationally, they have won 2 consecutive European Cups and 1 Latin Cup – totalling 88 trophies. Therefore, in terms of overall trophies, Benfica is the most decorated club in Portuguese football. (Note: The Latin Cup is a forerunner of the European Cup.)

In 2014, Benfica achieved the first ever treble of Primeira Liga, Taça de Portugal and Taça da Liga. Benfica was the first club to win the Primeira Liga and Taça da Liga double, moreover, a record four times. Benfica is the only club in Portugal to have successfully defended every major domestic title (Campeonato de Portugal, Primeira Liga, Taça de Portugal, Supertaça Cândido de Oliveira and Taça da Liga). In addition, Benfica are the only Portuguese team to have become back-to-back European champions.

=== Domestic ===
- Primeira Liga
  - Winners (38) – record: 1935–36, 1936–37, 1937–38, 1941–42, 1942–43, 1944–45, 1949–50, 1954–55, 1956–57, 1959–60, 1960–61, 1962–63, 1963–64, 1964–65, 1966–67, 1967–68, 1968–69, 1970–71, 1971–72, 1972–73, 1974–75, 1975–76, 1976–77, 1980–81, 1982–83, 1983–84, 1986–87, 1988–89, 1990–91, 1993–94, 2004–05, 2009–10, 2013–14, 2014–15, 2015–16, 2016–17, 2018–19, 2022–23
- Taça de Portugal
  - Winners (26) – record: 1939–40, 1942–43, 1943–44, 1948–49, 1950–51, 1951–52, 1952–53, 1954–55, 1956–57, 1958–59, 1961–62, 1963–64, 1968–69, 1969–70, 1971–72, 1979–80, 1980–81, 1982–83, 1984–85, 1985–86, 1986–87, 1992–93, 1995–96, 2003–04, 2013–14, 2016–17
- Taça da Liga
  - Winners (8) – record: 2008–09, 2009–10, 2010–11, 2011–12, 2013–14, 2014–15, 2015–16, 2024–25
- Supertaça Cândido de Oliveira
  - Winners (10): 1980, 1985, 1989, 2005, 2014, 2016, 2017, 2019, 2023, 2025
- Campeonato de Portugal
  - Winners (3): 1929–30, 1930–31, 1934–35

=== European ===
- European Cup (UEFA Champions League)
  - Winners (2): 1960–61, 1961–62

=== Other ===
- Latin Cup
  - Winners (1): 1950

=== Doubles ===
- Primeira Liga and Taça de Portugal

11 – record: 1942–43, 1954–55, 1956–57, 1963–64, 1968–69, 1971–72, 1980–81, 1982–83, 1986–87, 2013–14, 2016–17

- Primeira Liga and Taça da Liga

4 – record: 2009–10, 2013–14, 2014–15, 2015–16

- Taça de Portugal and Taça da Liga

1 – shared record: 2013–14

- European double

1 – shared domestic record: 1960–61

- European cup double

1 – domestic record: 1961–62

=== Trebles ===
- Primeira Liga, Taça de Portugal and Taça da Liga

1 – record: 2013–14

=== Portuguese Orders ===
- Commander of the Military Order of Christ (1932)
- Officer of the Order of Merit (1936)
- Medal of the Order of Prince Henry (1979)

== See also ==
- List of football club mergers
- List of UEFA club competition winners
- European Club Association
- S.L. Benfica (women)
