= Cosme Damião =

Portuguese footballer (1885–1947)

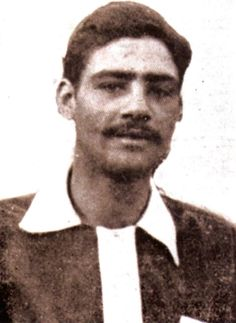
- Damião in 1915

Personal information
- Date of birth: 2 November 1885
- Place of birth: Lisbon, Portugal
- Date of death: 12 June 1947 (aged 61)
- Place of death: Sintra, Portugal
- Height: 1.78 m (5 ft 10 in)
- Position: Midfielder

Senior career*
| Years | Team | Apps | (Gls) |
| 1907–1916 | Benfica | 67 | (9) |

Managerial career
- 1908–1926: Benfica
- * Club domestic league appearances and goals

Cosme Damião (2 November 1885 – 12 June 1947) was a Portuguese football player-coach for S.L. Benfica.

A former midfielder, he is remembered as the main force behind the birth of Benfica and one of the first great Portuguese football players. Benfica's yearly awards, presented to its athletes for outstanding performance, are named after him: Galardão (Award) Cosme Damião. The Benfica museum is also named in his honour.

== Career ==
Damião was educated at the Real Casa Pia de Lisboa, in Lisbon, Portugal. Starting at a young age, he developed an enthusiasm for football. In 1903, he had the idea of starting a football team. On 28 February 1904, he and his friends founded Sport Lisboa. Later, in 1908, the club merged with Sport Clube de Benfica (previously Grupo Sport Benfica) and became Sport Lisboa e Benfica.

Damião started his player career on 19 February 1905 and debuted for the main squad at the age of 20 in a match against Lisbon Cricket Club. He played all his career in Benfica, as team captain and player-coach from 1908–09 to 1915–16. He played Benfica's first international match, against Stade Bordelais in 1911. In nine seasons, between 1907–08 and 1915–16, he played all of the team's 155 matches, which is a Benfica record. On 26 February 1916, at the age of 30, he retired from playing football, but continued to coach Benfica until 1925–26, leading the team for 18 years, which is another club record. He had the misfortune of ending his player career before the first match of the Portugal national team, but he still played for the Lisbon team and an unofficial National team that played in Brazil, in 1913. As a player, he represented Benfica for 11 seasons in which he played 169 games and was captain 160 times.

After his player career, Damião was also responsible for the football department of Benfica until 1926. On 8 August that year, he was elected president of S.L. Benfica but refused the position held by Bento Mântua. He helped to establish the Portuguese Football League in 1914, the predecessor of the Portuguese Football Federation. He was also the President of the Casa Pia Football Club, as well the founder and director (1913 to 1931) of the sports newspaper O Sport Lisboa, later renamed O Sport de Lisboa.

On 6 September 1931, Damião was elected President of General Assembly, which was the only management job he took at Benfica. He was re-elected in 1932, 1933 and 1934. In 1935, he received Benfica's Águia de Ouro (Golden Eagle). He died in Vila de Sintra on 12 June 1947, after a long illness, and was buried in the Cemitério dos Prazeres, in Lisbon.

== Honours ==
Player

- Campeonato de Lisboa (5): 1909–10, 1911–12, 1912–13, 1913–14, 1915–16

Coach

- Campeonato de Lisboa (3): 1916–17, 1917–18, 1919–20

== See also ==
- List of one-club men
- List of longest managerial reigns in association football
