= 1962–63 S.L. Benfica season =

Portuguese football club season

Benfica
1962–63 season
- President: António Fezas Vital
- Head coach: Fernando Riera
- Stadium: Estádio da Luz
- Primeira Divisão: Winners
- Taça de Portugal: Semi-finals
- European Cup: Runners-up
- Intercontinental Cup: Runners-up
- Top goalscorer: League: Torres (26); All: Eusébio (38)
- Biggest win: Benfica 12–0 Luso (4 October 1962)
- Biggest defeat: Benfica 2–5 Santos (10 November 1962)
Home colours	Away colours

The 1962–63 season was Sport Lisboa e Benfica's 59th season in existence and the club's 29th consecutive season in the top flight of Portuguese football, covering the period from 1 August 1962 to 31 July 1963. Domestically, Benfica competed in the Primeira Divisão and Taça de Portugal, while internationally the team took part in the European Cup as defending champions. As the reigning European Cup holders, they represented Europe in the Intercontinental Cup.

It was the club's first season under manager Fernando Riera. The squad was reinforced with the arrival of Pedras, while Mário João departed. The season began with a loss in the Intercontinental Cup to Santos. In the league, however, they recovered to finish first, one point ahead of Sporting and Porto. The title race was close throughout, but Benfica clinched the championship with a game to spare.

In Europe, Benfica eliminated FK Dukla Prague in the quarter-finals with a 2–1 aggregate victory. In the semi-finals against Feyenoord, they secured progress with a 3–1 aggregate win. On 22 May 1963, Benfica faced A.C. Milan in the final at Wembley Stadium. Eusébio opened the scoring, but two second-half goals from the Italians gave Milan the European Cup. The season concluded with elimination in the semi-finals of the Taça de Portugal, against rivals Sporting.

== Season summary ==
After a highly successful 1961–62 campaign, in which Benfica won its second European Cup and the Taça de Portugal, Béla Guttmann departed from the club, and was replaced by Chilean coach Fernando Riera

The main change in the squad was the arrival of Pedras, while Mário João departed. Pre-season began with a Scandinavian tour from 21 August to 4 September, followed by a 3–2 loss to Inter Milan in Italy, on 6 September, with goals from Simões and Águas. Shortly after, they faced Deportivo de La Coruña in the Teresa Herrera Trophy, losing 4–2 despite goals from Simões and José Augusto.

In the Taça de Honra, Benfica beat Sporting CP before defeating Atlético 4–0 in the final. The official season began on 19 September in the Intercontinental Cup against Santos. Despite a 3–2 away loss in the first leg, hopes were high for the return match in Lisbon. However, Pelé scored a hat-trick as Santos won 5–2. Between the two legs, Benfica lost 3–2 to Manchester United at Old Trafford, and defeated Hamburger SV 4–3 in Germany.

In October, Benfica started the league with three straight wins, but a 2–1 home defeat to Porto in November dropped them to second place, one point behind. In the European Cup, Benfica eliminated IFK Norrköping in the first round. By the end of the calendar year, four league wins and a draw saw them climb to first place with a one-point advantage.

The new year began with two 4–3 victories, against Vitória de Guimarães away and Sporting at home, with José Torres scoring a brace in the latter. Wins over Barreirense and Lusitano de Évora kept Benfica one point ahead of Porto. In February, victories against Belenenses and Académica, plus a home draw with Olhanense, left them level on points with Porto. Benfica then beat Porto 2–1 at Estádio das Antas, opening a two-point lead by the end of the month.

In March, Benfica won all five league games, extending the lead to three points. In the European Cup, they overcame FK Dukla Prague with a 2–1 home win and a 0–0 draw away, advancing to the semi-finals. In April, they recorded a 6–2 home win over Vitória de Guimarães, drew 0–0 away to Feyenoord, and beat Sporting 3–1 at Alvalade, reaching 44 points, four ahead of Porto with two matches remaining.

On 5 May, an 8–1 win over Barreirense secured Benfica its twelfth league title with one round remaining. Shortly after, they defeated Feyenoord 3–1 in Lisbon to qualify for their third consecutive European Cup final. On 22 May 1963, at Wembley Stadium, Eusébio gave Benfica the lead in the 19th minute against AC Milan. José Altafini equalised in the 58th minute. Two minutes later, Gino Pivatelli committed a foul on Mário Coluna, injuring Benfica's captain. Altafini scored again in the 69th minute, and Milan won 2–1 to claim its first European Cup.

In June, Benfica turned to the Taça de Portugal. They defeated Marinhense 8–1 on aggregate to set up a semi-final derby with Sporting. Benfica won the first leg 1–0 at Alvalade, but Sporting won 2–0 in the return leg, eliminating Benfica from the competition.

== Competitions ==
Win Draw Loss Postponed

=== Overall record ===
Competition	First match	Last match	Record								
Competition	First match	Last match	G	W	D	L	GF	GA	GD	Win %	Source
Primeira Divisão	21 October 1962	12 May 1963	26	23	2	1	81	25	+56	88.46	
Taça de Portugal	23 September 1962	22 July 1963	8	7	0	1	33	5	+28	87.50	
European Cup	31 October 1962	22 May 1963	7	3	3	1	12	6	+6	42.86	
Intercontinental Cup	19 September 1962	11 October 1962	2	0	0	2	4	8	−4	0.00	
Total			43	33	5	5	130	44	+86	76.74	

=== Primeira Divisão ===
==== League table ====
Pos	Team	Pld	W	D	L	GF	GA	GD	Pts	Qualification or relegation
1	Benfica (C)	26	23	2	1	81	25	+56	48	Qualification to European Cup preliminary round
2	Porto	26	19	4	3	61	24	+37	42	Qualification to Inter-Cities Fairs Cup first round
3	Sporting CP	26	18	2	6	71	31	+40	38	Qualification to Cup Winners' Cup first round
4	Belenenses	26	16	4	6	47	30	+17	36	Qualification to Inter-Cities Fairs Cup first round
5	Leixões	26	10	10	6	34	3	+31	30	

Source: RSSSF
(C) Champions

==== Results by round ====
Round	1	2	3	4	5	6	7	8	9	10	11	12	13	14	15	16	17	18	19	20	21	22	23	24	25	26
Ground	A	H	A	H	H	A	H	A	H	A	H	A	H	H	A	H	A	A	H	A	H	A	H	A	H	A
Result	W	W	W	L	W	W	W	D	W	W	W	W	W	W	W	D	W	W	W	W	W	W	W	W	W	W
Position	4	1	1	2	1	1	1	2	1	1	1	1	1	1	1	2	1	1	1	1	1	1	1	1	1	1

A = Away; H = Home; W = Win; D = Draw; L = Loss

==== Matches ====
21 October 1962 1	Belenenses	1–4	Benfica	Lisbon
16:00	Fernando Peres 5'		Eusébio 3'; António Simões 8'; Torres 20', 55'	Stadium: Estádio do Restelo; Referee: Manuel Fortunato

28 October 1962 2	Benfica	5-1	Académica	Lisbon
	Torres 7', 20'; José Augusto 48'; Cavém 68'; Eusébio 75'		Gaio 82'	Stadium: Estádio da Luz; Referee: Mário Mendonça

11 November 1962 3	Olhanense	1–0	Benfica	Olhão
			António Simões 81'	Stadium: Estádio Padinha; Referee: Inácio Tereso

18 November 1962 4	Benfica	1–2	Porto	Lisbon
	Eusébio 79'		Azumir 27', 60'	Stadium: Estádio da Luz; Referee: Virgílio Baptista

25 November 1962 5	Benfica	3–1	CUF	Lisbon
	Augusto 2', 10', 15'		Álvaro 87'	Stadium: Estádio da Luz; Referee: João Pinto Ferreira

2 December 1962 6	Vitória de Setúbal	0–3	Benfica	Lisbon
			José Águas 18'; Augusto 36'; Eusébio 59'	Stadium: Estádio do Bonfim; Referee: Dias Nunes

19 December 1962 7	Benfica	2–0	Atlético	Lisbon
16:00	Torres 64'; Eusébio 71'			Stadium: Estádio da Luz; Referee: Abel da Costa

23 December 1962 8	Leixões	0–0	Benfica	Matosinhos
				Stadium: Campo de Santana

27 December 1962 9	Benfica	6–0	Feirense	Lisbon
	José Augusto 51', 73'; Torres 53', 55', 71', 78'			Stadium: Estádio da Luz

6 January 1963 10	Vitória de Guimarães	3–4	Benfica	Guimarães
	António Mendes 15', 43'; Lua 46'		António Simões 12'; Eusébio 22'; Torres 42'; Augusto 67'	Stadium: Campo da Amarosa; Referee: Caetano Nogueira

13 January 1963 11	Benfica	4–3	Sporting	Lisbon
	Torres 17', 27'; Eusébio 29'; Santana 71'		José Pérides 70'; Morais 79'; Géo Carvalho 81'	Stadium: Estádio da Luz; Referee: Clemente Henriques

20 January 1963 12	Barreirense	1–3	Benfica	Barreiro
	33' Faneca		Eusébio 18'; Santana 23' (penalty); Coluna 55'

27 January 1963 13	Benfica	2–1	Lusitano de Évora	Lisbon
	Pedras 2'; Torres 34'		Vaz 26'	Stadium: Estádio da Luz

3 February 1963 14	Benfica	1–0	Belenenses	Lisbon
16:00	Torres 69'			Stadium: Estádio da Luz; Referee: Reinaldo Silva

10 February 1963 15	Académica	0–2	Benfica	Coimbra
			Eusébio 30', 66' (penalty)	Stadium: Estádio Cidade de Coimbra

17 February 1963 16	Benfica	1–1	Olhanense	Lisbon
	Torres 33'		Campos 58'	Stadium: Estádio da Luz

24 February 1963 17	Porto	1–2	Benfica	Porto
	Azumir 29'		António Simões 11'; Eusébio 53' ((penalty))	Stadium: Estádio das Antas; Referee: Reinaldo Silva

2 March 1963 18	CUF	2–3	Benfica	Lisbon
	Vieira Dias 28'; José Ferreira Pinto 76'		Torres 6', 10'; Santana 42'	Stadium: Campo de Santa Bárbara; Referee: Renato Santos

10 March 1963 19	Benfica	3–2	Vitória de Setúbal	Lisbon
	Eusébio 4' (penalty); Águas 8'; Simões 21'		Quim Silva 67'; Pedro Tavares 75'	Stadium: Estádio da Luz; Referee: Edmundo Carvalho

17 March 1963 20	Atlético CP	0–3	Benfica	Lisbon
			Simões 12', 61'; Eusébio 49'	Stadium: Estádio da Tapadinha; Referee: Clemente Henriques

24 March 1963 21	Benfica	2–0	Leixões	Lisbon
	Torres 14'; Coluna 87'			Stadium: Estádio da Luz

31 March 1963 22	Feirense	1–6	Benfica	Santa Maria da Feira
			Torres 17', 88'; Eusébio 28', 35', 46', 51'	Stadium: Estádio Marcolino de Castro; Referee: Braga Barros

7 April 1963 23	Benfica	6–2	Vitória de Guimarães	Lisbon
	Torres 1', 10', 17', 19'; Augusto Silva 12'; Santana 32'		Lua 38'; Paulino 80'	Stadium: Estádio da Luz; Referee: Renato Santos

28 April 1963 24	Sporting	1–3	Benfica	Lisbon
	Ernesto de Figueiredo 75'		Augusto Silva 15'; Eusébio 35' (penalty); Simões 51'	Stadium: Estádio José Alvalade; Referee: Virgílio Baptista

5 May 1963 25	Benfica	8–1	Barreirense	Lisbon
	Eusébio 9', 38', 42', 77'; Augusto 30'; Torres 48'; António Simões 79'; Santana 84'		Isidro Santos 69'	Stadium: Estádio da Luz; Referee: Encarnação Salgado

12 May 1963 26	Lusitano de Évora	1–3	Benfica	Évora
	José Pedro 53'		Eusébio 3'; Torres 47'; Simões 58'	Stadium: Campo Estrela; Referee: Braga Barros

=== Taça de Portugal ===
==== First round ====
23 September 1962 First leg	Luso F.C.	0–7	Benfica	Barreiro
			Águas 27'; Augusto Silva 29'; Pedras 32', 85'; Augusto 54', 88'; Santana 73' (penalty)	Stadium: Campo de Santa Bárbara; Referee: Reinaldo Silva

4 October 1962 Second leg	Benfica	12–0 (19–0 agg.)	Luso F.C.	Lisbon
	Jorge Calado 3', 23'; Torres 27', 43', 51', 68', 69', 82', 84'; Pedras 36', 46', 79'			Stadium: Estádio da Luz; Referee: Saldanha Ribeiro

==== Second round ====
7 October 1962 First leg	Lusitano de Évora	1–3	Benfica	Évora
	José Pedro 53'		Eusébio 27', 48'; Águas 86'	Stadium: Campo Estrela; Referee: Marcos Lobato

16 October 1962 Second leg	Benfica	2–1 (5–2 agg.)	Lusitano de Évora	Lisbon
	Eusébio 38'; Águas 44'		Pinho 64'	Stadium: Estádio da Luz; Referee: João Calado

==== Quarter-final ====
2 June 1963 First leg	Marinhense	1–3	Benfica	Marinha Grande
			Torres 29', 63'; Eusébio 58' (penalty)	Stadium: Campo de Portela; Referee: Edmundo Carvalho

8 June 1963 Second leg	Benfica	5–0 (8–1 agg.)	Marinhense	Lisbon
21:45	Águas 7'; Eusébio 21', 48', 67', 72'			Stadium: Estádio da Luz; Referee: João Calado

==== Semi-final ====
15 June 1963 First leg	Sporting	0–1	Benfica	Lisbon
21:45			Águas 57'	Stadium: Estádio José Alvalade; Referee: Francisco Guerra

22 June 1963 Second leg	Benfica	0–2 (1–2 agg.)	Sporting	Lisbon
21:45			Ernesto de Figueiredo 45', 48'	Stadium: Estádio da Luz; Referee: Clemente Henriques

=== European Cup ===
==== First round ====
31 October 1962 First leg	IFK Norrköping (Sweden)	1–1	(Portugal) Benfica	Norrköping
	Bill Björklund 8'	Report	Eusébio 31'	Stadium: Norrköpings Idrottspark; Attendance: 24,205; Referee: Gerhard Schulenburg (West Germany)

22 November 1962 Second leg	Benfica (Portugal)	5–1 (6–2 agg.)	(Sweden) IFK Norrköping	Lisbon
21:45	Águas 1'; Eusébio 18', 35', 85'; Coluna 21'	Report	Bill Björklund 62'	Stadium: Estádio da Luz; Attendance: 50,000; Referee: Jean Tricot (France)

==== Quarter-final ====
6 March 1963 First leg	Benfica (Portugal)	2–1	(Czech Republic) FK Dukla Prague	Lisbon
	Coluna 54', 85'	Report	Josef Vacenovský 63'	Stadium: Estádio da Luz; Attendance: 60,603; Referee: Ken Aston (ENG)

13 March 1963 Second leg	FK Dukla Prague (Czech Republic)	0–0 (1–2 agg.)	Benfica (Portugal)	Prague
		Report		Stadium: Velký strahovský stadion Attendance: 43,989; Referee: Arthur Holland (England)

==== Semi-final ====
10 April 1963 First leg	Feyenoord (Netherlands)	0–0	(Portugal) Benfica	Rotterdam
		Report		Stadium: De Kuip; Attendance: 51,826; Referee: Josef Kandlbinder (Austria)

8 May 1963 Second leg	Benfica (Portugal)	3–1 (3–1 agg.)	Feyenoord (Netherlands)	Lisbon
	Eusébio 20'; Augusto 43'; Santana 62'	Report	Frans Bouwmeester 80'	Stadium: Estádio da Luz; Attendance: 64,448; Referee: Joseph Barbéran (FRA)

===== Final =====
2 May 1963	Benfica (Portugal)	1–2	(Italy) Milan	London
19:30 CEST	Eusébio 19'	Report	Altafini 58', 69'	Stadium: Wembley; Attendance: 45,715; Referee: Arthur Holland (ENG)

=== Intercontinental Cup ===
19 September 1962 First leg	Santos (Brazil)	3–2	(Portugal) Benfica	Rio de Janeiro
	Pelé 31', 85'; Coutinho 64'	Report	Santana 58', 87'	Stadium: Maracanã; Attendance: 85,459; Referee: Rubén Cabrera (Paraguay)

11 October 1962 Second leg	S.L. Benfica (Portugal)	2–5 (4-8 agg.)	(Brazil) Santos	Lisbon
	Eusébio 85'; Santana 89'	Report	Pelé 15', 25', 64'; Coutinho 89'; Pepe 77'	Stadium: Estádio da Luz; Attendance: 73,000; Referee: Pierre Schwinte (France)

=== Friendlies ===
6 September 1962	Inter Milan	3–2	Benfica	Milan
			Simões; Águas	Stadium: Stadio Giuseppe Meazza

9 September 1962; Teresa Herrera Trophy	Deportivo de La Coruña	4–2	Benfica	Coruña
	Óscar Montalvo 17'; José Veloso 37'; Antonio Ruiz 75'; Jaime Blanco 85'		Simões 31'; Augusto 53'	Stadium: Municipal de Riazor

13 September 1962 Taça de Honra; Semi-Finals	Benfica	4–0	Sporting	Belém
19:00	Santana 41' (penalty); Torres 51', 57'; Pedras 63'			Stadium: Estádio do Rastelo; Referee: Henrique Silva

15 September 1962 Taça de Honra; Final	Benfica	3–1	Atlético	Belém
20:30	Coluna 27', 32'; Santana 43'		Carlos Gomes 87'	Stadium: Estádio do Rastelo

24 September 1962	Manchester United	2–2	Benfica	Manchester
			Eusébio	Stadium: Old Trafford

29 September 1962	Hamburger SV	3–4	Benfica	Hamburg
			Santana; Eusébio; Augusto; Cavém	Stadium: Volksparkstadion

5 June 1963	Stade Français	1–0	Benfica	Paris
				Stadium: Parc des Princes

== Player statistics ==
The squad for the season consisted of the players listed in the tables below, as well as staff member Fernando Riera (manager), Fernando Cabrita (assistant manager).

Note 1: Note: Flags indicate national team as defined under FIFA eligibility rules. Players may hold more than one non-FIFA nationality.

Note 2: Players with squad numbers marked ‡ joined the club during the 1962–63 season via transfer, with more details in the following section.

No.	Pos	Nat	Player	Total		Primeira Divisão		Taça de Portugal		European Cup		Intercontinental Cup	
No.	Pos	Nat	Player	Apps	Goals	Apps	Goals	Apps	Goals	Apps	Goals	Apps	Goals
1	GK	(Portugal) POR	Costa Pereira	38	0	26	0	4	0	7	0	1	0
1	GK	(Portugal) POR	José Barroca	2	0	0	0	2	0	0	0	0	0
1	GK	(Portugal) POR	Zé Rita	3	0	0	0	2	0	0	0	1	0
	DF	(Portugal) POR	Manuel Serra	2	0	0	0	2	0	0	0	0	0
	DF	(Portugal) POR	Augusto Silva	10	0	5	0	4	0	1	0	0	0
	DF	(Portugal) POR	Domingos Fernandes	1	0	0	0	1	0	0	0	0	0
	DF	(Portugal) POR	António Brás	1	0	0	0	1	0	0	0	0	0
2	DF	(Portugal) POR	Ângelo Martins	20	0	16	0	2	0	1	0	1	0
2	DF	(Portugal) POR	Domiciano Cavém	35	1	21	1	5	0	7	0	2	0
3	DF	(Portugal) POR	Jacinto	13	0	8	0	3	0	1	0	1	0
3	DF	(Portugal) POR	Raul Machado	37	0	5	0	23	0	7	0	2	0
4	DF	(Portugal) POR	Fernando Cruz	37	0	24	0	4	0	7	0	2	0
4	DF	(Portugal) POR	Germano	4	0	2	0	1	0	1	0	0	0
	MF	(Portugal) POR	António Saraiva	4	0	1	0	3	0	0	0	0	0
	MF	(Portugal) POR	José Neto	2	0	0	0	2	0	0	0	0	0
	MF	(Portugal) POR	Jorge Calado	1	2	0	0	1	2	0	0	0	0
	MF	(Portugal) POR	Pedras	4	6	2	1	2	5	0	0	0	0
	FW	(Portugal) POR	António Mendes	33	16	23	11	10	5	0	0	0	0
	FW	(Portugal) POR	Cesarino Carreira	1	0	0	0	1	0	0	0	0	0
5	MF	(Portugal) POR	Humberto Fernandes	31	0	6	0	17	0	6	0	2	0
6	MF	(Portugal) POR	Mário Coluna	40	5	26	2	5	0	7	3	2	0
7	FW	(Portugal) POR	José Augusto	39	12	24	9	6	2	7	1	2	0
8	FW	(Portugal) POR	Santana	29	10	17	5	5	1	5	1	2	3
9	FW	(Portugal) POR	José Águas	13	8	4	2	6	5	3	1	0	0
9	FW	(Portugal) POR	José Torres	27	35	21	26	2	9	4	0	0	0
10	FW	(Portugal) POR	Eusébio	39	38	24	23	6	8	7	6	2	1
11	FW	(Portugal) POR	António Simões	37	10	24	10	5	0	6	0	2	0
