= 1963 European Cup final =

- Match programme cover
- Event: 1962–63 European Cup
Benfica	Milan
(Portugal)	(Italy)
1	2
- Date: 22 May 1963
- Venue: Wembley Stadium, London
- Referee: Arthur Holland (England)
- Attendance: 45,715

The 1963 European Cup final was a football match played at Wembley Stadium in London, England, on 22 May 1963 to determine the winners of the 1962–63 European Cup.

The match was contested by two-time defending champions Benfica of Portugal and Milan of Italy, making it the first European Cup final not to feature a team from Spain.

Milan won the trophy for the first time thanks to a brace from José Altafini, which gave them a 2–1 victory.

== Background ==
Benfica had won the previous two editions of the competition, defeating Barcelona 3–2 in the 1961 final and Real Madrid 5–3 in the 1962 final.

Milan had contested the final once previously, losing 3–2 to Real Madrid in 1958.

This was the eighth European Cup final and was the first to not feature a Spanish club. Real Madrid had contested six of the previous seven finals while Barcelona represented Spain in the 1961 final – the only previous final not to feature Real Madrid.

== Route to the final ==
(Portugal) Benfica				Round	(Italy) Milan			
Opponent	Agg.	1st leg	2nd leg		Opponent	Agg.	1st leg	2nd leg
Bye				Prelim. round	Union Luxembourg	14–0	8–0 (H)	6–0 (A)
(Sweden) IFK Norrköping	6–2	1–1 (A)	5–1 (H)	First round	(England) Ipswich Town	4–2	3–0 (H)	1–2 (A)
(Czechoslovakia) Dukla Prague	2–1	2–1 (H)	0–0 (A)	Quarter-finals	(Turkey) Galatasaray	8–1	3–1 (A)	5–0 (H)
(Netherlands) Feyenoord	3–1	0–0 (A)	3–1 (H)	Semi-finals	(Scotland) Dundee	5–2	5–1 (H)	0–1 (A)

=== Benfica ===
Benfica qualified for the competition as defending champions and they were given a bye in the preliminary round.

In the first round, Benfica faced IFK Norrköping of Sweden. After a 1–1 draw in the first leg away from home, Benfica won the second leg 5–1 at home to advance 6–2 on aggregate.

Benfica then faced Dukla Prague of Czechoslovakia in the quarter-finals. After Benfica won the first leg 2–1 at home, the teams played out a goalless draw in the second leg in Prague as Benfica advanced.

In the semi-finals, Benfica faced Feyenoord of the Netherlands. After a goalless first leg in Rotterdam, Benfica won the second leg 3–1 at home to advance to the final.

=== Milan ===
Milan qualified for the competition as winners of the 1961–62 Serie A.

In the preliminary round, Milan defeated Union Luxembourg of Luxembourg 8–0 a home in the first leg and 6–0 away in the second leg to advance 14–0 on aggregate.

Ipswich Town of England were Milan's opponents in the first round. After winning the first leg 3–0 at home, Milan lost the second leg away from home 2–1 to advance 4–2 on aggregate.

Milan then faced Galatasaray of Turkey in the quarter-finals. After winning the first leg 3–1 away from home, Milan won the second leg 5–0 at home to advance 8–1 on aggregate.

In the semi-finals, Milan's opponents were Dundee of Scotland. A 5–1 win in the first leg at home was followed up by a 1–0 defeat in the second leg away from home as Milan advanced to the final 5–2 on aggregate.

== Match ==
Milan won the match 2–1.

=== Details ===
22 May 1963
15:00 BST

Benfica (Portugal)	1–2	(Italy) Milan
Eusébio 19'	Report	Altafini 58', 66'

Wembley Stadium, London
Attendance: 45,715
Referee: Arthur Holland (England)

Benfica	Milan

GK	1	(Portugal) Costa Pereira
RB	2	(Portugal) Domiciano Cavém
CH	3	(Portugal) Raul Machado
LB	4	(Portugal) Fernando Cruz
RH	5	(Portugal) Humberto Fernandes
LH	6	(Portugal) Mário Coluna (c)
OR	7	(Portugal) José Augusto
IR	8	(Portugal) Santana
CF	9	(Portugal) José Torres
IL	10	(Portugal) Eusébio
OL	11	(Portugal) António Simões
Manager:
(Chile) Fernando Riera

GK	1	(Italy) Giorgio Ghezzi
RB	2	(Italy) Mario David
LB	3	(Italy) Mario Trebbi
RH	4	(Peru) Víctor Benítez
CH	5	(Italy) Cesare Maldini (c)
LH	6	(Italy) Giovanni Trapattoni
OR	7	(Italy) Gino Pivatelli
IR	8	(Brazil) Dino Sani
CF	9	(Italy) José Altafini (Note: A Brazilian expatriate, Altafini had represented his native Brazil at the 1958 FIFA World Cup, but in 1961 he changed allegiances to Italy. He notably played for Italy at the 1962 World Cup.)
IL	10	(Italy) Gianni Rivera
OL	11	(Italy) Bruno Mora
Manager:
(Italy) Nereo Rocco

== See also ==
- 1962–63 S.L. Benfica season
- 1962–63 AC Milan season
- 1963 European Cup Winners' Cup final
- 1963 Inter-Cities Fairs Cup final
- 1963 Intercontinental Cup
- 1990 European Cup final – contested between same teams
- S.L. Benfica in international football
- AC Milan in international football
