= Humberto Fernandes =

Portuguese footballer (1940–2009)

Personal information
- Full name: Humberto da Silva Fernandes
- Date of birth: 14 June 1940
- Place of birth: Lisbon, Portugal
- Date of death: 8 February 2009 (aged 68)
- Place of death: Lisbon, Portugal
- Height: 1.75 m (5 ft 9 in)
- Position: Centre-back

Youth career
- 1953–1958: Benfica

Senior career*
Years	Team	Apps	(Gls)
1958–1970	Benfica	58	(0)
1970–1971	Estrela de Portalegre		
1971–1973	Sport Lisboa e Cartaxo		
Total		58	(0)
- * Club domestic league appearances and goals

Humberto da Silva Fernandes (14 June 1940 – 8 February 2009) was a Portuguese footballer who played mainly as a centre-back.

Over the course of 12 seasons, Fernandes amassed Primeira Liga totals of 58 games, all at Benfica, winning 11 major titles.

== Career ==
Born in Penha de França, Lisbon, Fernandes is a youth product of Benfica, serving the club for seventeen seasons. He made his debut on 2 November 1958 in win against Braga. Playing mostly for the reserves, he spent the entirety of his career serving as back-up to Alfredo, Fernando Cruz, Raúl Machado, Jacinto Santos and Germano, appearing only sporadically through the course of 12 years.

In 1970, he left Benfica to sign with Estrela de Portalegre, ending his career at Sport Lisboa e Cartaxo in 1973, at age 33.

== Honours ==
Benfica

- Primeira Liga: 1962–63, 1963–64, 1964–65, 1966–67, 1967–68, 1968–69
- Taça de Portugal: 1961–62, 1963–64, 1968–69, 1969–70
- European Cup: 1961–62
- Intercontinental Cup runner-up: 1961, 1962
