= Eusébio =

Portuguese footballer (1942–2014)

Eusébio GCIH GCM
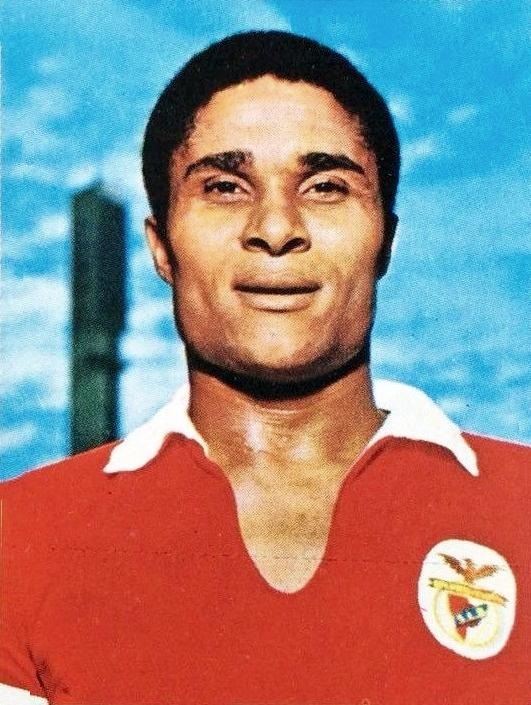
- Eusébio with Benfica in 1973

Personal information
- Full name: Eusébio da Silva Ferreira
- Date of birth: 25 January 1942
- Place of birth: Lourenço Marques, Portuguese Mozambique
- Date of death: 5 January 2014 (aged 71)
- Place of death: Lisbon, Portugal
- Height: 1.75 m (5 ft 9 in)
- Position: Striker

Youth career
- Sporting Lourenço Marques

Senior career*
| Years | Team | Apps | (Gls) |
| 1957–1960 | Sporting Lourenço Marques | 42 | (77) |
| 1961–1975 | Benfica | 301 | (317) |
| 1975 | Boston Minutemen | 7 | (2) |
| 1975 | Monterrey | 10 | (1) |
| 1975–1976 | Toronto Metros-Croatia | 21 | (16) |
| 1976 | Beira-Mar | 12 | (3) |
| 1976–1977 | Las Vegas Quicksilvers | 17 | (2) |
| 1977–1978 | União de Tomar | 12 | (3) |
| 1978–1979 | New Jersey Americans | 9 | (2) |
| 1979–1980 | Buffalo Stallions (indoor) | 5 | (1) |
| Total | | 436 | (424) |

International career
| 1961–1973 | Portugal | 64 | (41) |
Medal record
Men's football
Representing Portugal
FIFA World Cup
| Third place | 1966 England |
- * Club domestic league appearances and goals

Eusébio da Silva Ferreira (European Portuguese: [ewˈzɛβju ðɐ ˈsilvɐ fɨˈʁɐjɾɐ]; 25 January 1942 – 5 January 2014), nicknamed the "Black Panther", the "Black Pearl" or "o Rei" ("the king"), was a Portuguese footballer who played as a striker. He is considered one of the greatest players of all time as well as Benfica's best player ever. He was known for his speed, technique, athleticism and right-footed shot, making him a prolific goalscorer, accumulating 733 goals in 745 matches. Eusébio was the first ever player to win European Golden Boot, World Cup Golden Boot and UCL Golden Boot. In the UEFA Champions League, he ranks second for the all-time Portuguese top goalscorers, scoring 46 goals.

Eusébio helped Portugal reach third place at the 1966 FIFA World Cup, being the top goalscorer of the tournament with nine goals. He won the Ballon d'Or in 1965 and was runner-up in 1962 and 1966. He is Benfica's all-time top scorer with 473 goals in 440 competitive matches. There, his honours include eleven Primeira Liga titles and a European Cup, also being integral in reaching additional European Cup finals in 1963, 1965 and 1968. He is the second-highest goalscorer, behind Alfredo Di Stéfano, in the pre-Champions League era of the European Cup with 47 goals. He was the European Cup top scorer in 1964–65, 1965–66 and 1967–68. He also won the Bola de Prata for the Primeira Liga top scorer a record seven times. He was the first ever player to win the European Golden Boot, in 1968, a feat he replicated in 1973.

From his retirement until his death, Eusébio was an ambassador of football and was one of the most recognizable faces of his generation. His name often appears in best player of all time lists and polls by football critics and fans. He was elected the ninth-best footballer of the 20th century in a poll by the IFFHS and the tenth-best footballer of the 20th century in a poll by the World Soccer magazine. Pelé named Eusébio as one of the 125 best living footballers in his 2004 FIFA 100 list. He was seventh in the online poll for UEFA Golden Jubilee Poll. In November 2003, to celebrate UEFA's Jubilee, he was selected as the Golden Player of Portugal by the Portuguese Football Federation as their most outstanding player of the past 50 years. Shortly after Eusébio's death, Di Stéfano stated: "For me Eusébio will always be the best player of all time".

== Early life ==
Eusébio was born in the Mafalala neighbourhood of Lourenço Marques (now Maputo), Portuguese Mozambique on 25 January 1942. His parents were Laurindo António da Silva Ferreira, a white railroad worker from Malanje, Portuguese Angola, and his wife Elisa Anissabeni, a black Mozambican woman. He was the fourth child of his parents out of five children (Jaime, Alberto, Adelino, Eusébio and Lucília). Elisa Anissabeni later had another three children from a second marriage (Gilberto, Inocência and Fernando). Growing up in an extremely poor neighbourhood, he used to skip school classes to play barefoot football with his friends (one of them was known as José Manuel Alves Holbeche Bastos, whose father José Rodrigues Holbeche Bastos played professional football for Sporting Clube de Lourenço Marques) on improvised pitches and using stuffed socks as footballs. His father also played football in his youth and supported Lisbon's SL Benfica and its affiliate team in Portuguese Mozambique, Grupo Desportivo de Lourenço Marques. He died from tetanus when Eusébio was eight years old in 1950, so the widowed Elisa almost exclusively raised young Eusébio alone. Absorbed by football from an early age, Eusébio studied until the 4th grade (concluded through a final exam when he was already in mainland Portugal), the only among his brothers and sisters without post-primary education. Three of his siblings became engineers.

== Club career ==
=== Early career ===
Eusébio first started to play for a local amateur team that he and his friends formed called Os Brasileiros (The Brazilians), in honour of the great Brazil national team of the 1950s. They would play under the names of some of those superstars. The balls they used were made of socks stuffed with newspapers rolled into spheres.

=== Sporting Lourenço Marques ===
With some friends, Eusébio tried to join Desportivo de Lourenço de Marques, his favourite team and a Benfica feeder team (also the team where Mário Coluna had played before his move to Benfica) but was rejected, without even being given a chance to prove his worth. He was also rejected by Ferroviário de Lourenço Marques. At 12, he then tried his luck with Sporting Clube de Lourenço Marques (branch number 6 of Sporting Lisbon), which accepted him as well as a group of his friends who lived in Eusébio's neighbourhood. There he had his first training sessions supervised by a coaching staff, received his first ever football equipment and played competitive football in an organized way at both youth level and the main senior team. At 15, according to him, he was spotted by a former Juventus goalkeeper turned scout: "When I was 15, Juventus of Italy, wanted to hire me, because one of their scouts, who had been a famous Italian goalkeeper for them, saw me and told them that there was a boy with a potential, that it would be good to take advantage while I was still unknown. Juventus proposed but my mum never wanted to hear anything from anyone". Eusébio played his first two seasons with Sporting Lourenço Marques' youth team while he also made a few appearances in the senior team. Then he was promoted to the main squad and won the Campeonato Provincial de Moçambique and the Campeonato Distrital de Lourenço Marques in his last season with the club, in 1960. From 1957 to 1960, Eusébio scored 77 goals in 42 appearances for the main team of Sporting Lourenço Marques.

=== Benfica ===
==== The transfer ====
On 15 December 1960, Eusébio arrived in Lisbon, when he was 18 years old. However, he only joined Benfica in May 1961, as a 19-year-old, after the transfer from his local club Sporting Lourenço Marques for 400,000 Portuguese escudos (equivalent to €193,219 in 2023) was finally unlocked. It was a lengthy process and the legality of the signing was disputed by Sporting CP, who also tried to sign him. In the first few weeks of 1961, the Portuguese Directorate-General for Sports ruled in favour of Sporting CP's interests; soon after, the Portuguese Football Federation ruled in favour of Benfica's arguments. The agreement to sign Eusébio with Benfica's local representative (Rodrigues de Carvalho, a major) had been mediated in Mozambique, in June 1960, by one of Eusébio's brothers who was an engineer by training and intervened as an informal sports agent on behalf of his brother, and included the payment of 250,000 Portuguese escudos to Elisa Anissabene, Eusébio's mother (an initial offer of 110,000 escudos which raised to the final 250,000 escudos in November amid growing interest from other football clubs). Benfica discovered Eusébio through the efforts of Brazilian former player José Carlos Bauer, who saw him at Lourenço Marques in 1960. Although he preferred playing with his right foot, Eusébio could use his left just as well. At times, Eusébio would surprise opponents with his dribbling ability, seemingly a talent he preferred to keep secret. Bauer first recommended Eusébio to his former club, São Paulo, but they turned him down.

Bauer had been asked by his former coach at São Paulo, Béla Guttmann, to keep an eye out for talented players during a ten-week tour to Africa, and when São Paulo could not afford the asking price for Eusébio, Bauer then recommended him to Guttmann, who was coaching Benfica at the time. Guttman moved quickly and signed him.

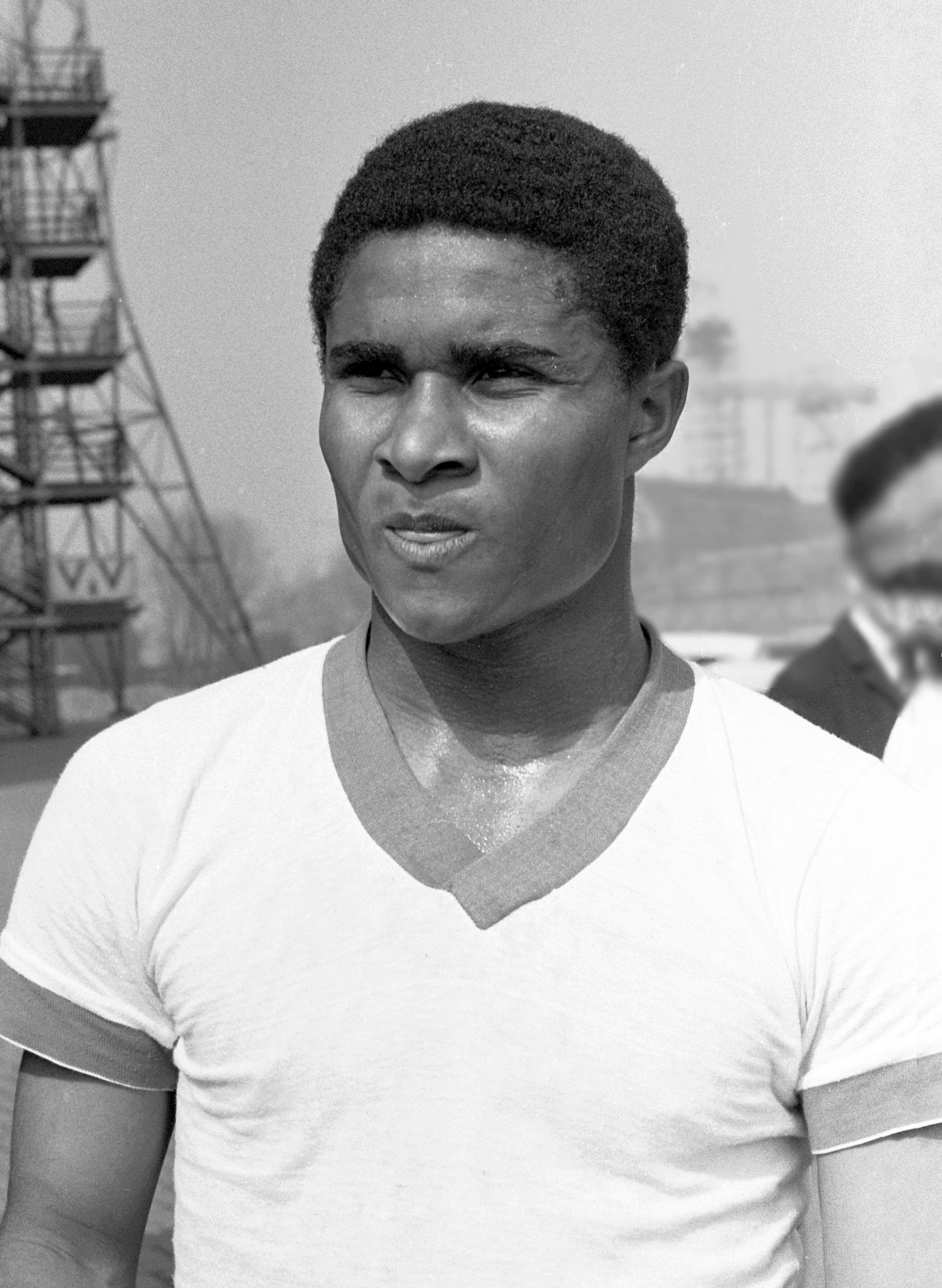
Eusébio during his time at Benfica. He is the club's record goalscorer, with 473 goals in 440 competitive matches.

Sporting Lourenço Marques was an affiliate team of Sporting CP, and the Portuguese club disputed the legality of his transfer to Benfica. Eusébio once said: "I used to play for Sporting's feeder club in Mozambique. Benfica wanted to pay me in a contract to go [to Portugal] while Sporting wanted to take me as a junior player for the experience with no monetary reward. Benfica made a nice approach. They went to speak to my mum, my brother, and offered €1,000 for three years. My brother asked for double and they paid it. They signed the contract with my mother and she got the money. [...] Sporting tried to spread the story that I'd stitched them up, but it was the other way round, because they tried to take me for free while Benfica were willing to pay."

Hilário, a friend of Eusébio since childhood and former colleague at the Mozambican club, tried to convince Eusébio to go to Sporting CP. Hilário went to Benfica's dorms, met Eusébio there and Eusébio left the building with Hilário. On behalf of Sporting CP, Hilário offered him an improved professional contract instead of a trial period at the club. Sporting CP's contract offer was double Benfica's, included the necessary funds to allow financial compensation to Benfica for the incurred costs to date, and, according to Hilário, he was successful in that endeavor, but at the end of the day he left Eusébio to rest overnight back in the dorms. Benfica found this meeting suspicious and instructed Eusébio to be codenamed Ruth Malosso. Moreover, fearing a "kidnapping" attempt by Sporting CP, Benfica moved Eusébio on 8 April 1961 to a holiday home owned by Domingos Claudino, former president of Benfica, and a hotel near the Meia Praia beach, in Lagos, Algarve region, where he would remain for twelve days until the transfer upheaval calmed down (Eusébio was awarded his 4th grade diploma while he was hidden in the Algarve). Fearing that Eusébio would "escape", Benfica's representatives reportedly warned him of the "danger of being run over". Eusébio then told his mother: "Mum, I'm going back because there are men here who want to hurt me." In the early hours of 13 May 1961, those in charge of Eusébio's transfer to Benfica occasionally bumped into Jaime Catarino Duarte, son of António Catarino Duarte who was the president of the club at the time, and the son of the president wanted to know where the case stood. He was told that almost everything had been taken care of, with just 400,000 escudos (400 contos) missing before Eusébio could finally be registered by Benfica. Catarino Duarte provided the necessary funds and the transfer was finalized.

==== Debut and career ====
The transferring of Eusébio's registration from Sporting Lourenço Marques to Benfica was concluded and he made his first appearance for them against Atlético Clube de Portugal in a friendly game on 23 May 1961. He scored a hat-trick in a 4–2 victory. His debut in an official match was on 1 June 1961, against Vitória de Setúbal, in the third round second leg of the 1960–61 Taça de Portugal. The game was controversially scheduled for the day after the European Cup final against Barcelona and the Portuguese Football Federation did not postpone it. As the first team was returning from Bern, Benfica played with the reserve squad and was defeated 1–4. Eusébio scored a goal and missed a penalty (the first of only five he missed throughout his career), but this was not enough to win the round (4–5 on aggregate). On 10 June 1961, Eusébio played for the first time in the Primeira Divisão, the last match day against Belenenses, where he scored a goal in a 4–0 win. On 15 June, Benfica played the final of the invitational Tournoi de Paris against Pelé's Santos, and in the beginning of the second half, with Benfica down 0–4, Béla Guttmann decided to bring Eusébio from the bench to substitute Santana. Shortly after coming in, Santos reached 0–5. However, between the 63rd and the 80th minute, Eusébio scored 3 goals and suffered a foul inside the penalty area, the penalty taker, José Augusto, failed to score though. The game finished 6–3 for Santos, with Eusébio being on the cover of the famed French sporting newspaper L'Équipe.

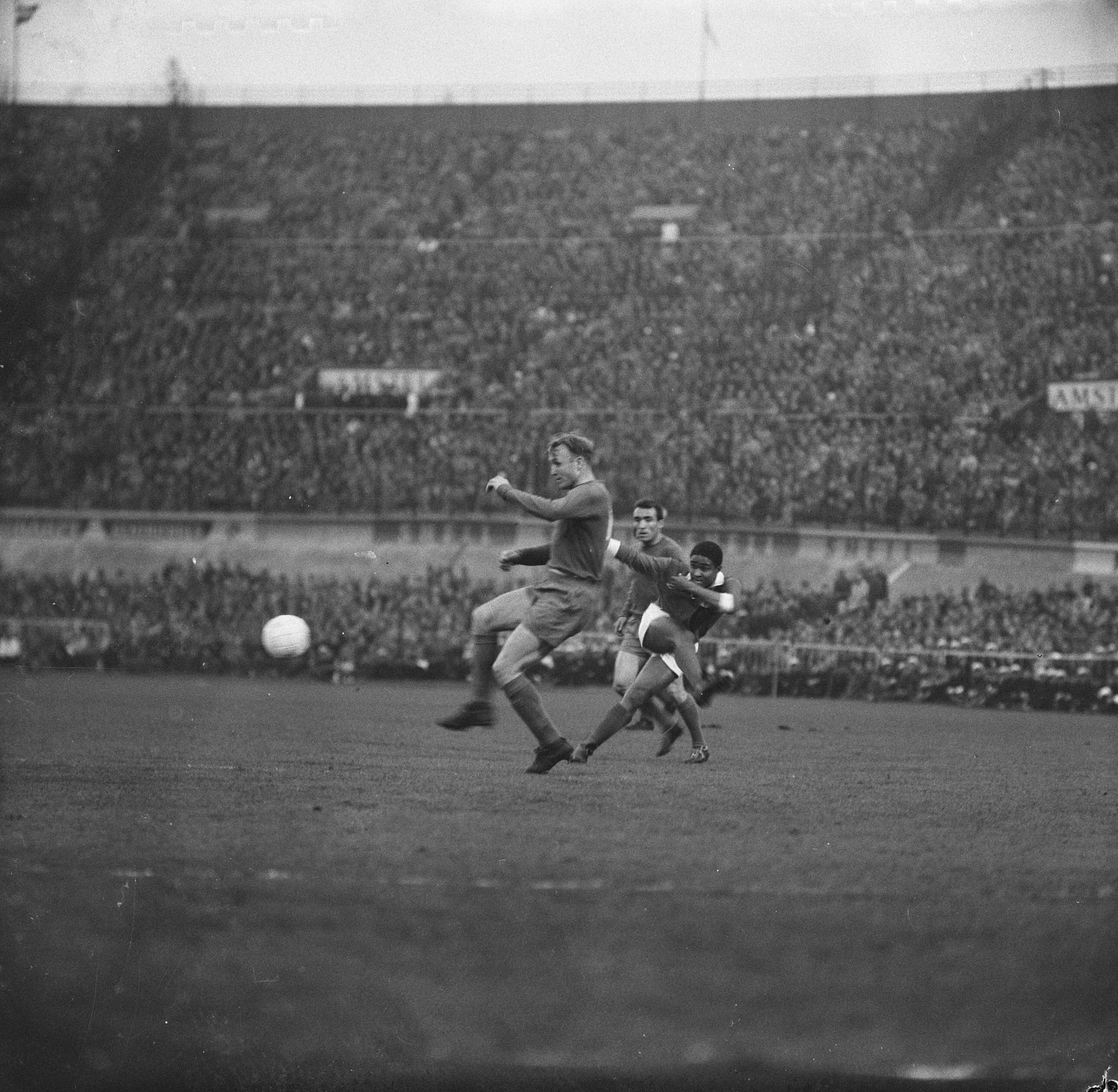
Eusébio strikes against Real Madrid during the 1962 European Cup Final.

His following season was the one where he started to gain global recognition among football fans and critics alike. He scored 12 goals in 17 league matches, and even though the club finished third, they won the Taça de Portugal against Vitória de Setúbal, with Eusébio scoring two goals in the final. In that same season, he won the European Cup, also scoring two goals in the final against Real Madrid in a 5–3 result to Benfica. Due to his fine form during the season, he finished second in the 1962 Ballon d'Or, in his first complete season as a professional. In October 1963, he was selected to represent the FIFA team in the "Golden Anniversary" of The Football Association at Wembley Stadium.

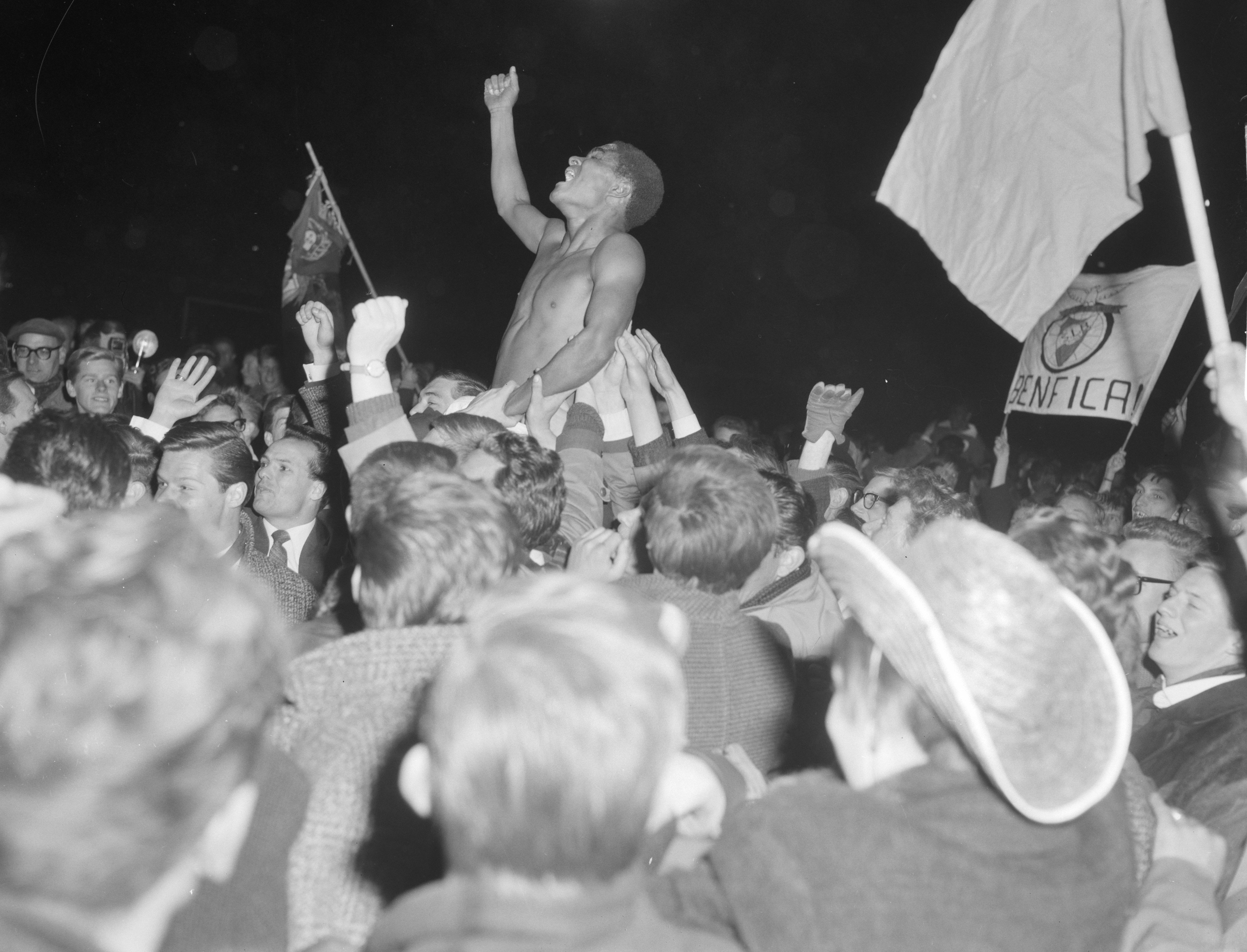
Eusébio celebrating Benfica's 1962 European Cup victory

Benfica were also European Cup runners-up in 1963, 1965 and 1968. In the 1968 defeat to the English league champions Manchester United at Wembley Stadium, with the scores 1–1, he came close to winning the game for Benfica in the dying seconds of the game, only to have his shot saved by Alex Stepney. Despite this, and the fact that the English side went on to win 4–1 in extra time, he openly congratulated Stepney for his efforts throughout the game, stopping to applaud Stepney as he threw the ball back into play.

He received a number of individual accolades and awards while playing for Benfica. He was the 1965 European Footballer of the Year (Ballon d'Or) and finished as runner-up twice, in 1962 and 1966, and in 1968 was the first winner of the Golden Boot Award, as Europe's leading scorer, a feat he repeated five years later. He was the Portuguese First Division's top scorer seven times (1964, 1965, 1966, 1967, 1968, 1970 and 1973), helping Benfica to win 11 Primeira Liga (1960–61, 1962–63, 1963–64, 1964–65, 1966–67, 1967–68, 1968–69, 1970–71, 1971–72, 1972–73 and 1974–75), 5 Portuguese Cup wins (1961–62, 1963–64, 1968–69, 1969–70 and 1971–72), 1 European Cup win (1961–62) and 3 European Cup finals (1962–63, 1964–65 and 1967–68).

Eusébio scored 473 goals in 440 official matches for Benfica, including 317 goals in 301 Primeira Liga matches, and 59 goals in 78 matches of UEFA club competitions. Overall, he scored 727 goals in 715 matches wearing Benfica's jersey.

=== Later career ===
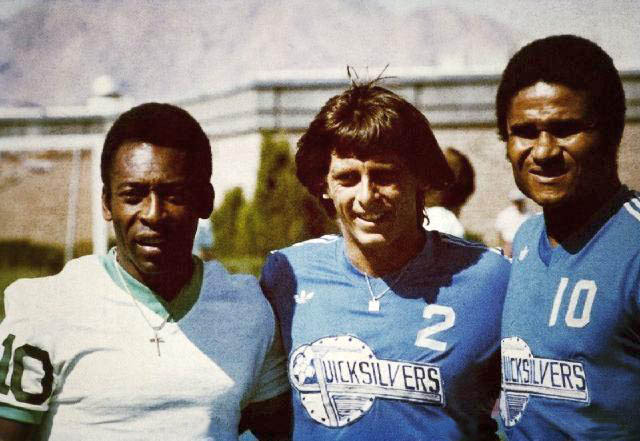
Eusébio (right) with Pelé (left) and Brian Joy (centre) before a game in the NASL in April 1977

In 1976–77 and 1977–78, Eusébio played for two smaller Portuguese clubs, Beira-Mar, in the first division, and União de Tomar, in the Second Division.

He also played in the North American Soccer League (NASL), for three different teams, from 1975 to 1977: Boston Minutemen (1975), Toronto Metros-Croatia (1976), and the Las Vegas Quicksilvers (1977). His most successful season in the NASL was in 1976 with Toronto Metros-Croatia. He scored the winning goal in their 3–0 victory at the Soccer Bowl '76 to win the NASL title. The same year, he played ten games for Monterrey in the Mexican league.

The following season (1977), he signed for the Las Vegas Quicksilvers. By this time, injuries had taken their toll on the Black Panther, and he was constantly receiving medical treatment whilst playing for the Quicksilvers. During the season, he only managed to score two goals.

Although his knees robbed him of his ability to continue in the NASL, Eusébio wanted to continue to play soccer. He found a home in 1978 with the New Jersey Americans of the second-tier American Soccer League (ASL). He went on to play five games for the Buffalo Stallions during the 1979–80 Major Indoor Soccer League season. He retired in 1979 and formed part of the technical committee of the Portugal national football team.

== International career ==
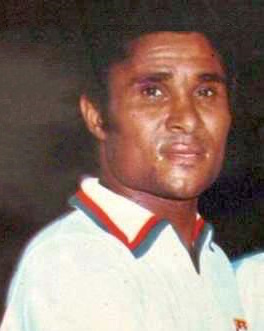
Eusébio as Portugal's captain against Argentina in 1972.

Eusébio was the leading scorer for his country, with 41 goals in 64 matches, until Pauleta equalled and surpassed his record against Latvia on 12 October 2005. Eusébio was also the most capped Portuguese player from 1972, until Nené made his 64th cap against Yugoslavia on 2 June 1984 in a friendly match, breaking Eusébio's record during the UEFA Euro 1984 on 20 June against Romania. He made his debut for the Portugal national team against Luxembourg on 8 October 1961, a match his country lost 4–2, with the player scoring Portugal's first goal in the match.

=== 1966 World Cup ===
After Portugal qualified for the 1966 World Cup, they were drawn in Group 3, alongside Bulgaria, Hungary and the reigning champions Brazil. After a modest performance against Hungary in the first game, Eusébio scored a goal against Bulgaria. Topping the group with two wins, the team would play against the Brazilians for the final group match. With an injured Pelé, Portugal had no trouble in defeating them with two goals from Eusébio, including a famous volley from a tight angle after a corner kick. The result meant Brazil's early elimination.

In the quarter-final, Portugal played North Korea, who had defeated and eliminated Italy in the group stage. After trailing 0–3 in the 25th minute, Eusébio proceeded to score four consecutive goals, two before half time and two in the first fifteen minutes of the second half. His fourth goal in that match came from a penalty when two North Korean players tackled him after a fast run Eusébio had made from the middle of the Portuguese half to the opposition's penalty area. Portugal came back to win 5–3.

In the semi-final match Portugal faced England; taking a last-minute train trip from Liverpool to London. Throughout the game Eusébio was closely marked by England's defensive midfielder Nobby Stiles, but still managed to score Portugal's only goal from the penalty spot in the 82nd minute, ending yet-to-be broken records of seven consecutive clean sheets and 708 minutes without conceding a goal for the English team. After scoring the penalty, Eusébio went on to catch the ball and saluted Gordon Banks. The goal was not enough to nullify Bobby Charlton's two earlier goals. António Simões had a last-minute chance only for Stiles to make it into a corner. Portugal lost 1–2 and Eusébio famously walked off the pitch in tears, being comforted by both his teammates and opponents. The game is known as the Jogo das Lágrimas (Game of Tears) in Portugal.

In the third place match, Portugal played against the Soviet Union. In the 12th minute after a handball inside the area, Eusébio scored the opening goal (his ninth and final World Cup goal) from the penalty spot. Although Lev Yashin guessed the side in which the ball would go, he was powerless to save it. Again and as he had done before with Banks, Eusébio went to salute his friend Yashin after he had scored. Portugal won the game 2–1 in what remains their best ever World Cup participation, and the best performance by a team on its debut since Italy's victory in 1934.

In addition to winning the Golden Boot (with nine goals) for the 1966 World Cup, Eusébio also set a record that year for the most penalties scored (shoot-out not included), with four. Eusébio's four goals against North Korea in the quarter-final match also helped Portugal tie the record for largest deficit overcome in a win (three goals, equaling Austria in 1954) and he became the fifth player to score as many goals in a FIFA World Cup match, a record he jointly held until Oleg Salenko scored five in the 1994 World Cup. The English were so impressed by Eusébio's performances that his waxwork was immediately added to the Madame Tussauds in London. He also received the BBC Overseas Sports Personality of the Year for 1966.

== Personal life ==
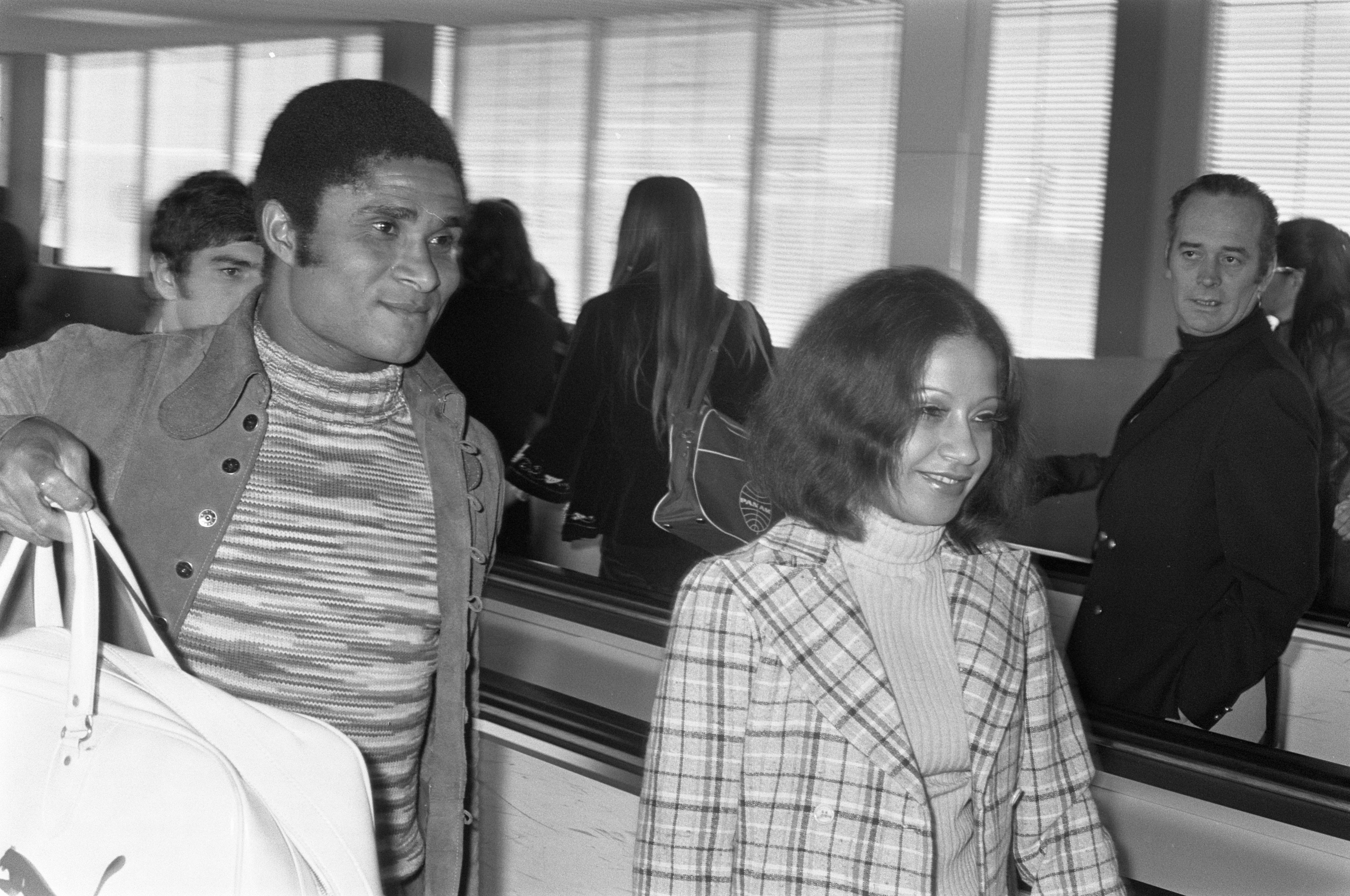
Eusébio accompanied by his wife, Flora, in April 1972

Eusébio was a devout Roman Catholic and married Flora Claudina Bruheim on 8 October 1965. They had two daughters together, Carla Elisa Bruheim da Silva Ferreira (born 1968) and Sandra Judite Bruheim da Silva Ferreira (born 1969).

Eusébio said he went to the Portuguese Parliament eight times to talk to António de Oliveira Salazar who ruled the country from 1932 to 1968 as the virtual dictator of the Estado Novo regime. Eusébio had invitations from big clubs in Europe, and was interested in signing for them, but could not because the "godfather", as he recalled Salazar, would not let him go.

After the Carnation Revolution of 1974 in Lisbon and the subsequent independence of Portugal's overseas territory of Mozambique as the People's Republic of Mozambique in 1975, Eusébio lost all of his property and investments in the African country.

In a 2011 interview, Eusébio said that he did not like Sporting Lourenço Marques (Sporting CP's affiliate club in Mozambique) because in his neighbourhood it was deemed a club of the elites and the police, which did not like people of color. Eusébio described the club as "racist". Moreover, he also said he did not like Sporting CP while mentioning the kidnapping story "they made up" regarding his transfer to Benfica: "What I do not like is Sporting [CP]" [...] "I do not even like Sporting from there [Mozambique], let alone the one from here [Portugal]". Eusébio liked Desportivo Lourenço Marques, Benfica's feeder team in Mozambique that shared identical symbols and motto with Benfica, just like his brother and late father.

After he had been accepted by Sporting Lourenço Marques together with a group of friends from his neighbourhood, in the course of an interview a day after Eusébio's first match for Sporting Lourenço Marques in which he scored three goals, Eusébio accused Desportivo Lourenço Marques head coach of being a racist, and, according to Eusébio, Desportivo's head coach was fired shortly after.

== Death ==
Eusébio died at his home on 5 January 2014 of heart failure, aged 71. Many well-known people from the football world expressed their condolences and praise, including his contemporaries Franz Beckenbauer and Bobby Charlton. The Portuguese Football Federation made a statement and said that a moment of silence was to be observed in Portuguese football matches. There were tributes from Cristiano Ronaldo, Luís Figo, José Mourinho, Carlos Queiroz, FIFA President Sepp Blatter UEFA president Michel Platini, Greg Dyke, and former President of Mozambique and childhood friend Joaquim Chissano.

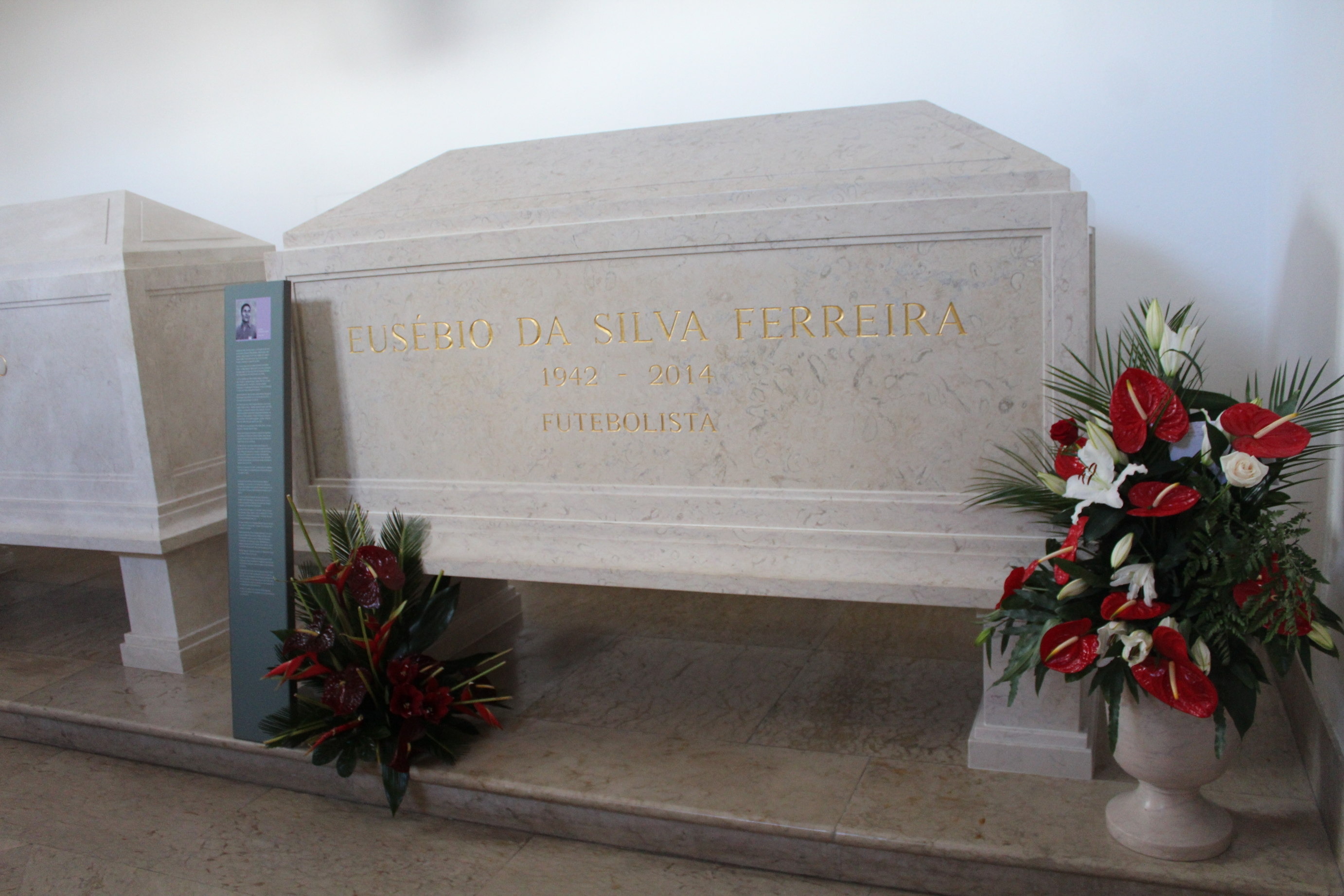
Eusébio's tomb in the National Pantheon, Lisbon

Following Eusébio's death, the Portuguese government declared three days of national mourning. Hundreds of thousands paid tribute to him. On 6 January 2014, a mass was held at the Igreja do Seminário do Largo da Luz. On 9 January, one of his wishes was granted as his coffin was transported around the field of the Estádio da Luz. Three days later, his statue (inaugurated on his 50th birthday) at the Praça Centenarium was transformed into a memorial. Hours later, the name "Eusébio" was on the back of every Benfica players' shirts during "O Clássico".

Precisely one year after his death, the avenue in front of the Estádio da Luz was renamed Avenida Eusébio da Silva Ferreira, becoming its new address. On 3 July, his remains were moved to the National Pantheon, where notable Portuguese personalities are buried. Parliament voted unanimously for him to be interred there. Eusébio was the first footballer to be buried at the Pantheon.

In September 2019, Eusébio was, along with Maria Mutola, referred by Pope Francis as an example of perseverance, during the latter's visit to Mozambique. Eusébio has been called "Africa's first great footballer" and "Africa's greatest-ever player".

== Career statistics ==
=== Club ===
Appearances and goals by club, season and competition
| Club | Season | League | | | National cup (Note: Includes Taça de Portugal) | | Continental | | Other | | Total | |
| Club | Season | Division | Apps | Goals | Apps | Goals | Apps | Goals | Apps | Goals | Apps | Goals |
|---|---|---|---|---|---|---|---|---|---|---|---|---|
| Sporting de Lourenço; Marques | 1957 | Moçambola | 4 | 9 | — | | — | | — | | 4 | 9 |
| Sporting de Lourenço; Marques | 1958 | Moçambola | 7 | 11 | — | | — | | — | | 7 | 11 |
| Sporting de Lourenço; Marques | 1959 | Moçambola | 11 | 21 | — | | — | | — | | 11 | 21 |
| Sporting de Lourenço; Marques | 1960 | Moçambola | 20 | 36 | — | | — | | — | | 20 | 36 |
| Sporting de Lourenço; Marques | Total | | 42 | 77 | — | | — | | — | | 42 | 77 |
| Benfica | 1960–61 | Primeira Divisão | 1 | 1 | 1 | 1 | 0 | 0 | — | | 2 | 2 |
| Benfica | 1961–62 | Primeira Divisão | 17 | 12 | 7 | 11 | 6 (Note: Appearances in European Cup) | 5 | 1 (Note: Appearance(s) in Intercontinental Cup) | 1 | 31 | 29 |
| Benfica | 1962–63 | Primeira Divisão | 24 | 23 | 6 | 8 | 7 | 6 | 2 | 1 | 39 | 38 |
| Benfica | 1963–64 | Primeira Divisão | 19 | 28 | 6 | 14 | 3 | 4 | – | | 28 | 46 |
| Benfica | 1964–65 | Primeira Divisão | 20 | 28 | 7 | 11 | 9 | 9 | – | | 36 | 48 |
| Benfica | 1965–66 | Primeira Divisão | 23 | 25 | 2 | 5 | 5 | 7 | – | | 30 | 37 |
| Benfica | 1966–67 | Primeira Divisão | 26 | 31 | 3 | 7 | 4 (Note: Appearances in Inter-Cities Fairs Cup) | 4 | – | | 33 | 42 |
| Benfica | 1967–68 | Primeira Divisão | 24 | 42 | 2 | 2 | 9 | 6 | – | | 35 | 50 |
| Benfica | 1968–69 | Primeira Divisão | 21 | 10 | 9 | 18 | 5 | 1 | – | | 35 | 29 |
| Benfica | 1969–70 | Primeira Divisão | 22 | 21 | 2 | 1 | 4 | 4 | – | | 28 | 26 |
| Benfica | 1970–71 | Primeira Divisão | 22 | 19 | 7 | 9 | 3 (Note: Appearances in European Cup Winners' Cup) | 7 | – | | 32 | 35 |
| Benfica | 1971–72 | Primeira Divisão | 24 | 19 | 5 | 8 | 8 | 1 | – | | 37 | 28 |
| Benfica | 1972–73 | Primeira Divisão | 28 | 40 | 1 | 0 | 4 | 2 | – | | 33 | 42 |
| Benfica | 1973–74 | Primeira Divisão | 21 | 16 | 3 | 2 | 4 | 1 | – | | 28 | 19 |
| Benfica | 1974–75 | Primeira Divisão | 9 | 2 | 0 | 0 | 4 | 0 | – | | 13 | 2 |
| Benfica | Total | | 301 | 317 | 61 | 97 | 75 | 57 | 3 | 2 | 440 | 473 |
| Boston Minutemen | 1975 | NASL | 7 | 2 | — | | — | | 1 (Note: Appearance(s) in NASL play-offs) | 0 | 8 | 2 |
| Monterrey | 1975–76 | Mexican Primera División | 10 | 1 | — | | — | | — | | 10 | 1 |
| Toronto Metros-Croatia | 1976 | NASL | 21 | 16 | — | | — | | 4 | 2 | 25 | 18 |
| Beira-Mar | 1976–77 | Primeira Divisão | 12 | 3 | — | | — | | — | | 12 | 3 |
| Las Vegas Quicksilvers | 1977 | NASL | 17 | 2 | — | | — | | — | | 17 | 2 |
| União de Tomar | 1977–78 | Segunda Divisão | 9 | 3 | — | | — | | — | | 9 | 3 |
| New Jersey Americans | 1978 | ASL | 9 | 2 | — | | — | | — | | 9 | 2 |
| New Jersey Americans | 1979 | ASL | — | | — | | — | | — | | — | |
| New Jersey Americans | Total | | 9 | 2 | — | | — | | — | | 9 | 2 |
| Buffalo Stallions (indoor) | 1979–80 | MISL | 5 | 1 | — | | — | | — | | 5 | 1 |
| Career total | | | 433 | 424 | 61 | 97 | 75 | 57 | 8 | 4 | 577 | 582 |

=== International ===
Appearances and goals by national team and year
| National team | Year | Apps | Goals |
|---|---|---|---|
| Portugal | 1961 | 2 | 1 |
| Portugal | 1962 | 5 | 2 |
| Portugal | 1963 | 1 | 0 |
| Portugal | 1964 | 6 | 4 |
| Portugal | 1965 | 7 | 7 |
| Portugal | 1966 | 12 | 12 |
| Portugal | 1967 | 6 | 3 |
| Portugal | 1968 | 2 | 1 |
| Portugal | 1969 | 4 | 2 |
| Portugal | 1970 | 1 | 0 |
| Portugal | 1971 | 5 | 2 |
| Portugal | 1972 | 9 | 4 |
| Portugal | 1973 | 4 | 3 |
| Total | | 64 | 41 |

== Honours ==
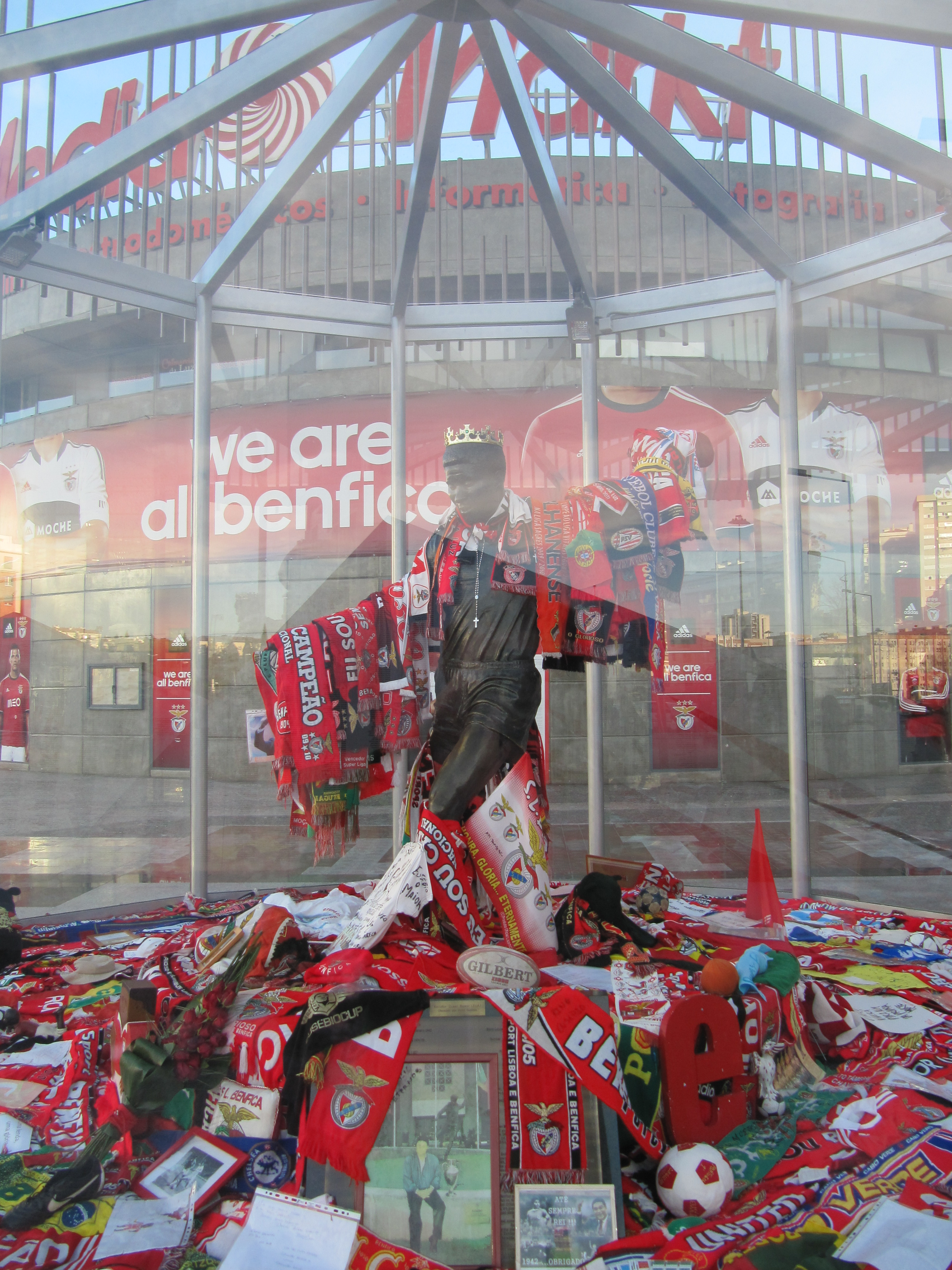
Statue of Eusébio outside Estádio da Luz

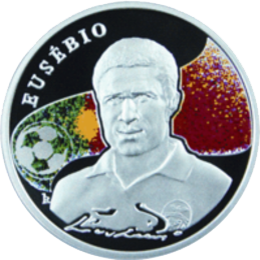
Eusébio on a commemorative coin from Armenia

Sporting de Lourenço Marques

- Campeonato Provincial de Moçambique: 1960

Benfica

- Primeira Liga (11): 1960–61, 1962–63, 1963–64, 1964–65, 1966–67, 1967–68, 1968–69, 1970–71, 1971–72, 1972–73, 1974–75
- Taça de Portugal (5): 1961–62, 1963–64, 1968–69, 1969–1970, 1971–1972
- Taça de Honra de Lisboa (9): 1962–63, 1964–65, 1966–67, 1967–68, 1968–69, 1971–72, 1972–73, 1973–74, 1974–75
- Taça Ribeiro dos Reis (3): 1963–64, 1965–66, 1970–71
- European Cup: 1961–62
- Intercontinental Cup runner-up: 1961, 1962

Toronto Metros-Croatia

- NASL: 1976

Portugal

- FIFA World Cup third place: 1966
- Independence Cup runner-up: 1972

Individual

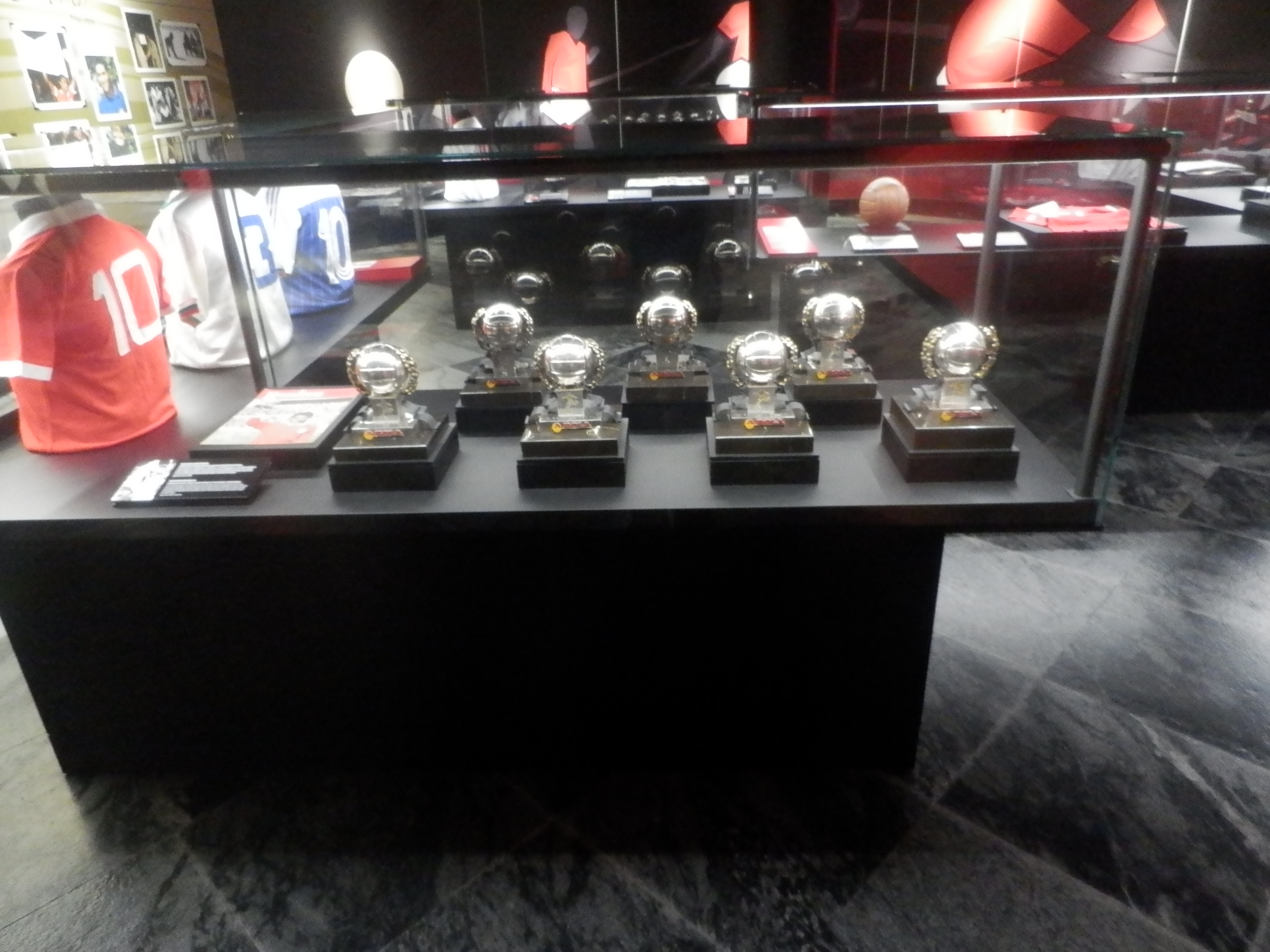
Eusébio's seven Bolas de Prata on display at Museu Benfica

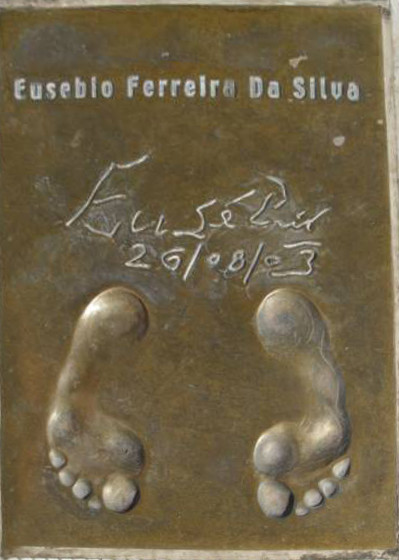
Eusébio's Golden Foot in Monaco

- Ballon d'Or: 1965 runner-up:1962 1966; nominated: 1961, 1963, 1964, 1967, 1968, 1970, 1972, 1973
- FIFA XI: 1963, 1967
- World Soccer World XI: 1965
- FUWO European Team of the Year: 1965, 1966, 1967
- European Golden Shoe (2): 1968 (first winner), 1973
- Bola de Prata (7): 1964, 1965, 1966, 1967, 1968, 1970, 1973
- European Cup top scorer (2): 1966, 1968
- Taça de Portugal top scorer (5): 1962, 1964, 1965, 1969, 1972
- Campeonato Provincial de Moçambique top scorer: 1960
- FIFA World Cup Golden Boot: 1966
- FIFA World Cup Bronze Ball: 1966
- FIFA World Cup All-Star Team: 1966
- Portuguese Footballer of the Year (2): 1970, 1973
- FIFA 100
- FIFA International Football Hall of Champions
- IFFHS Legends
- UEFA Jubilee Awards – Golden Player Portugal
- Portuguese Golden Ball career award: 1991
- France Football's World Cup Top-100
- Planète Foot's 50 Meilleurs Joueurs du Monde
- Voetbal International's Wereldsterren
- Guerin Sportivo's I 50 Grandi del Secolo
- World Soccer's Selection of the 100 Greatest Footballers of All Time
- Placar's 100 Craques do Século
- Venerdì's 100 Magnifici
- Golden Foot Legends Award: 2003
- IFFHS World's Best Player of the Century (9th place)
- BBC Overseas Sports Personality of the Year: 1966
- FIFA Order of Merit: 1994
- UEFA President's Award: 2009
- PFA Merit Award: 1993
- Scottish PFA Merit Award: 2007

Orders

- Grand Cross of the Order of Prince Henry
- Grand Cross of the Order of Merit

== See also ==
- List of footballers with 500 or more goals
- Eusébio Cup

== Filmography ==
- Juan de Orduña, Eusébio, la Pantera Negra (1973)
- Filipe Ascensão, Eusébio: História de uma Lenda (2017)
- António Pinhão Botelho, Ruth (2018)
