= Raul Machado =

Portuguese footballer (1937–2023)

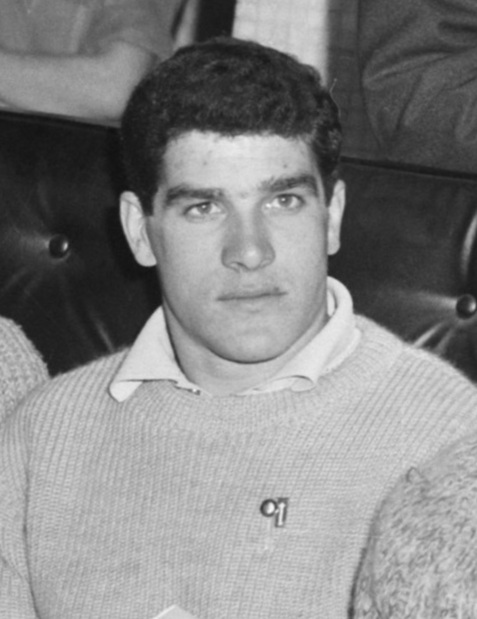
- Machado in 1963

Personal information
- Full name: Raul Martins Machado
- Date of birth: 22 September 1937
- Place of birth: Matosinhos, Portugal
- Date of death: 22 October 2023 (aged 86)
- Position: Centre-back

Youth career
- Bebés do Mar

Senior career*
Years	Team	Apps	(Gls)
1959–1962	Leixões	74	(2)
1962–1969	Benfica	122	(2)
1969–1970	Leixões	19	(0)
Total		216	(4)

International career
1962–1968	Portugal	11	(0)
- * Club domestic league appearances and goals

Raul Martins Machado (22 September 1937 – 22 October 2023) was a Portuguese footballer who played as centre-back.

== Club career ==
Born in Matosinhos, Machado joined his home-town club, Leixões, at the age of 21. In the three seasons there, he help them maintain in the Primeira Divisão and win the 1961 Portuguese Cup.

His performances led to a move to Benfica in 1962, and made his debut on 21 October 1962, in an away win to Belenenses. Due to an injury in Germano, he played 37 games in the centre of a WM formation, winning the league title and losing the European Cup Final. In the next season, he lost his starting position to Luciano, playing the majority of his games in the domestic cup, which the club successfully conquered. After a one-year on the right side of the WM formation, Machado easily adapted to the more common 4–4–2 in 1965 and played four more seasons at Benfica.

Machado partnered with Germano and later Jacinto Santos, winning three more league titles and losing a third European Cup Final. With the rapid rise of Humberto Coelho, he left in 1969 with 193 matches and seven goals, retiring after a last season at Leixões.

== International career ==
Machado received 11 caps for the national team in a six-year spell. He was first called up by manager José Maria Antunes in 1962, to play the preliminary round of the 1964 European Nations' Cup qualifying against Bulgaria. He played both legs, on 7 November and 16 December, but Bulgaria progressed after a 1–0 on replay. Due to strong competition in his position, he did not take part in the 1966 FIFA World Cup, but reappeared in the UEFA Euro 1968 qualifying stages in 1967.

== Death ==
Machado died on 22 October 2023, at the age of 86.

== Honours ==
Leixões

- Taça de Portugal: 1960–61

Benfica

- Primeira Liga: 1962–63, 1963–64, 1964–65, 1966–67, 1967–68, 1968–69
- Taça de Portugal: 1963–64, 1968–69
- Taça de Honra (4)
- European Cup runner-up: 1962–63, 1964–65, 1967–68
- Intercontinental Cup runner-up: 1962
