= Augusto Silva =

Augusto Silva may refer to:

- Augusto Silva (footballer, born 1902) (1902–1962), Portuguese football midfielder and manager
- Augusto Silva (footballer, born 1939), Portuguese footballer
- Augusto Santos Silva (born 1956), Portuguese minister and university professor
- Augusto da Silva (1876–1968), Brazilian Roman Catholic cardinal
