= José Augusto (footballer) =

Portuguese footballer (born 1937)

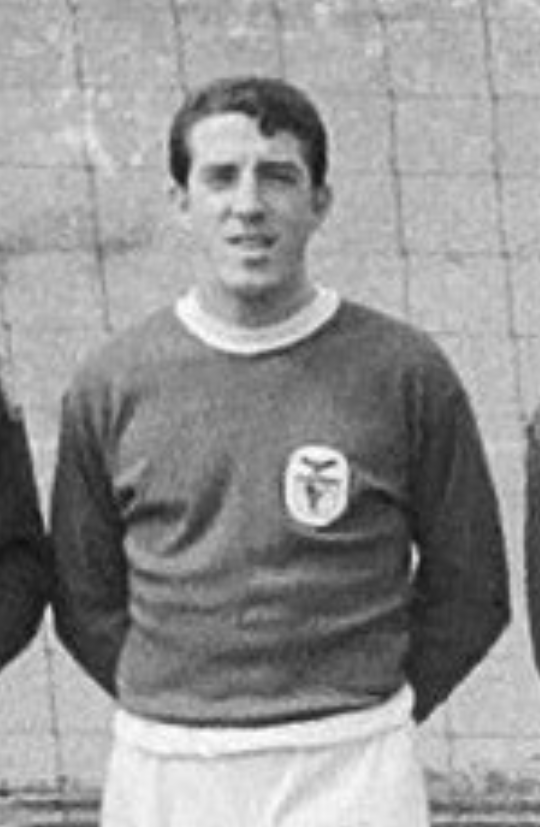
- José Augusto with Benfica in 1965

Personal information
- Full name: José Augusto Pinto de Almeida
- Date of birth: 13 April 1937 (age 89)
- Place of birth: Barreiro, Portugal
- Height: 1.78 m (5 ft 10 in)
- Position: Winger

Youth career
- 1951–1955: Barreirense

Senior career*
Years	Team	Apps	(Gls)
1955–1959	Barreirense	98	(50)
1959–1969	Benfica	246	(113)
Total		344	(163)

International career
1958–1968	Portugal	45	(9)

Managerial career
- 1970: Benfica (caretaker)
- 1970–1971: Benfica (assistant)
- 1971–1973: Portugal
- 1974: Vitória Setúbal
- 1976–1978: Portimonense
- 1979: Barreirense
- 1980–1987: Portugal (youth / U21)
- 1987–1989: Farense
- 1989–1990: Penafiel
- 1993: Amora
- 1994–1995: Logroñés
- 1996–1997: Alverca
- KAC
- FUS Rabat
- 2004–2007: Portugal (women)
Medal record
Men's football
Representing Portugal
FIFA World Cup
Third place	1966 England
- * Club domestic league appearances and goals

José Augusto Pinto de Almeida (Portuguese pronunciation: [ʒuˈzɛ awˈɡuʃtu]; born 13 April 1937), known as José Augusto, is a Portuguese retired football winger and manager.

He played most of his career with Benfica, for which he appeared in 369 competitive matches and scored 174 goals, winning 13 titles including eight Primeira Liga championships and two European Cups. He was dubbed the "Portuguese Garrincha" by Gabriel Hanot.

A Portugal international over one decade, José Augusto represented the nation at the 1966 World Cup. He later worked as a manager for more than 30 years.

== Club career ==
Born in Barreiro, Setúbal District, José Augusto started playing with local F.C. Barreirense, spending four seasons in the Primeira Liga there. In summer 1959 he joined S.L. Benfica, going on to be part of the club's legendary attacking unit that also included Mário Coluna, Eusébio, António Simões and José Torres. He and his teammates won two European Cups, in 1961 and 1962, and still reached a further three finals in the decade; in the 1960–61 domestic league season he scored a career-best 24 goals in only 25 games, helping the side to the title.

José Augusto retired early into the 1969–70 campaign at the age of 32, immediately being named Benfica's head coach and leading them to the second position behind Sporting CP. He subsequently worked with several teams, including S.C. Farense and F.C. Penafiel in the top division.

In 1994–95, in what was his first experience abroad, José Augusto was one of five managers in charge of CD Logroñés, as the side was relegated from La Liga with an all-time low 13 points.

== International career ==
José Augusto made his debut for Portugal on 7 May 1958, in a 2–1 friendly loss with England. He took part in a further 44 internationals in ten years, and scored nine goals.

José Augusto was selected for the 1966 FIFA World Cup squad. He played all the games and scored three times through headers for the eventual third-placed team, twice against Hungary in the opener (3–1, the first in the first minute) and once against North Korea in the quarter-finals (5–3).

As a manager, José Augusto had a two-year spell with the national side, leading them to the runner-up position in the Brazil Independence Cup and through the unsuccessful 1974 World Cup qualifying campaign. In the 80s he was in charge of the youth teams, helping develop Carlos Queiroz; additionally, he was an assistant in the UEFA Euro 1984 finals in France.

From 2004 to 2007, José Augusto coached the women's national team.

== Career statistics ==
José Augusto de Almeida: International goals
No.	Date	Venue	Opponent	Score	Result	Competition
1	21 April 1963	Estádio Nacional, Lisbon, Portugal	Brazil	1–0	1–0	Friendly
2	29 April 1964	Hardturm, Zurich, Switzerland	Switzerland	1–3	2–3	Friendly
3	3 May 1964	King Baudouin Stadium, Brussels, Belgium	Belgium	1–2	1–2	Friendly
4	12 June 1966	Estádio Nacional, Lisbon, Portugal	Norway	2–0	4–0	Friendly
5	12 June 1966	Estádio Nacional, Lisbon, Portugal	Norway	4–0	4–0	Friendly
6	13 July 1966	Old Trafford, Manchester, England	Hungary	1–0	3–1	1966 FIFA World Cup
7	13 July 1966	Old Trafford, Manchester, England	Hungary	2–1	3–1	1966 FIFA World Cup
8	23 July 1966	Goodison Park, Liverpool, England	North Korea	5–3	5–3	1966 FIFA World Cup
9	11 December 1968	Karaiskakis Stadium, Athens, Greece	Greece	0–1	4–2	1970 World Cup qualification

== Honours ==
=== Player ===
Benfica

- Primeira Liga (8): 1959–60, 1960–61, 1962–63, 1963–64, 1964–65, 1966–67, 1967–68, 1968–69
- Taça de Portugal: 1961–62, 1963–64, 1968–69
- Taça de Honra
- European Cup: 1960–61, 1961–62
- Intercontinental Cup runner-up: 1961, 1962

Portugal

- FIFA World Cup third place: 1966

=== Manager ===
Benfica

- Taça de Portugal: 1969–70

Portugal

- Brazil Independence Cup runner-up

=== Individual ===
- World Soccer World XI: 1964, 1965
