= Barroca (footballer, born 1937) =

Portuguese footballer (1936–2015)

Personal information
- Full name: José Pedro Barroca da Silva
- Date of birth: 23 May 1937
- Place of birth: Lisbon, Portugal
- Date of death: 17 May 2015 (aged 77)
- Place of death: Faro, Portugal
- Height: 1.74 m (5 ft 9 in)
- Position: Goalkeeper

Youth career
- –1960: Benfica

Senior career*
Years	Team	Apps	(Gls)
1960–1963	Benfica	7	(0)
1963–1970	Sporting	19	(0)
1970–1972	Farense	26	(0)
1972–1974	Olhanense	40	(0)
Total		92	(0)

International career
1955	Portugal U18	1	(0)
- * Club domestic league appearances and goals

José Pedro Barroca da Silva (23 May 1937 – 17 May 2015) was a Portuguese professional footballer.

== Career statistics ==
=== Club ===
Club	Season	League			Cup		Other		Total	
Club	Season	Division	Apps	Goals	Apps	Goals	Apps	Goals	Apps	Goals
Benfica	1959–60	Primeira Divisão	3	0	1	0	0	0	4	0
Benfica	1960–61	Primeira Divisão	2	0	2	0	0	0	4	0
Benfica	1961–62	Primeira Divisão	2	0	2	0	0	0	4	0
Benfica	1962–63	Primeira Divisão	0	0	2	0	0	0	2	0
Benfica	Total		7	0	7	0	0	0	14	0
Sporting	1963–64	Primeira Divisão	1	0	0	0	0	0	1	0
Sporting	1964–65	Primeira Divisão	11	0	0	0	0	0	11	0
Sporting	1965–66	Primeira Divisão	0	0	0	0	0	0	0	0
Sporting	1966–67	Primeira Divisão	7	0	2	0	0	0	9	0
Sporting	1967–68	Primeira Divisão	0	0	0	0	0	0	0	0
Sporting	1968–69	Primeira Divisão	0	0	0	0	0	0	0	0
Sporting	1969–70	Primeira Divisão	0	0	0	0	0	0	0	0
Sporting	Total		19	0	2	0	0	0	21	0
Farense	1970–71	Primeira Divisão	22	0	0	0	0	0	22	0
Farense	1971–72	Primeira Divisão	4	0	0	0	0	0	4	0
Farense	Total		26	0	0	0	0	0	26	0
Olhanense	1972–73	Segunda Divisão	28	0	0	0	0	0	28	0
Olhanense	1973–74	Primeira Divisão	12	0	1	0	0	0	13	0
Olhanense	Total		40	0	1	0	0	0	41	0
Career total			92	0	10	0	0	0	102	0
