= Augusto Silva (footballer, born 1939) =

Portuguese footballer

Personal information
- Full name: Augusto Lamela da Silva
- Date of birth: 6 February 1939 (age 87)
- Place of birth: Barcelos, Portugal
- Height: 1.75 m (5 ft 9 in)
- Positions: Defender; midfielder

Youth career
- 1955–1958: Vitória Guimarães

Senior career*
Years	Team	Apps	(Gls)
1958–1962	Vitória Guimarães	37	(6)
1962–1967	Benfica	36	(4)
Total		73	(10)
- * Club domestic league appearances and goals

Augusto Lamela da Silva (born 6 February 1939) is a Portuguese former footballer who played as a right back but also as a right midfielder.

Over nine seasons, he amassed Primeira Liga totals of 73 matches and ten goals.

== Club career ==
Born in Barcelos, Braga District, Silva moved at a young age to Guimarães to learn the job of metalworker for a Textile industry, belonging to the president of local Vitória SC. While at the club he suffered two serious injuries to his meniscus, but eventually recovered.

Silva was signed by S.L. Benfica in 1962, and made his debut on 23 September of the same year against Luso FC. His best input at the Estádio da Luz consisted of 17 games in the 1965–66 season, contributing a runner-up finish.

In January 1967, in a tour to Santiago, Silva suffered a cerebrovascular accident that left him permanently incapable of ever playing football, affecting his right eye, his speech and his motor skills. Coach Fernando Riera remained with him until he recovered enough to return to Portugal on 17 February; he then worked as a doorman for Benfica, also occupying administrative positions for them.

== Personal life ==
In a seven-month span in 1961, Silva lost a daughter and a son (both aged seven months) to poliomyelitis.

== Honours ==
Benfica

- Primeira Liga: 1962–63, 1963–64, 1964–65, 1966–67
- Taça de Portugal: 1963–64
