= Fernando Cruz (footballer) =

Portuguese footballer (1940–2025)

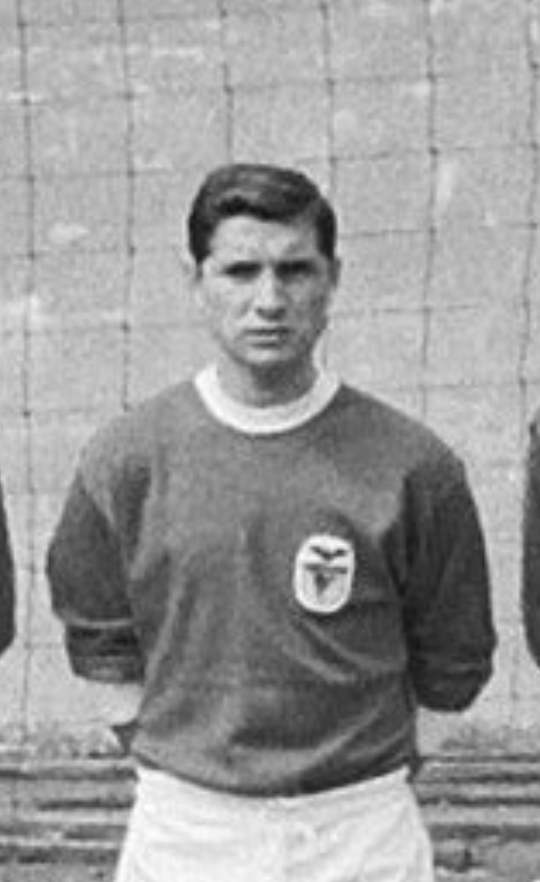
- Cruz with Benfica in 1965

Personal information
- Full name: Fernando da Conceição Cruz
- Date of birth: 12 August 1940
- Place of birth: Lisbon, Portugal
- Date of death: 16 August 2025 (aged 85)
- Place of death: Lisbon, Portugal
- Height: 1.63 m (5 ft 4 in)
- Position: Left-back

Youth career
- 1956–1959: Benfica

Senior career*
Years	Team	Apps	(Gls)
1959–1970	Benfica	227	(0)
1970–1971	Paris Saint-Germain	24	(0)
Total		251	(0)

International career
1961–1968	Portugal	11	(0)
Medal record
Men's football
Representing Portugal
FIFA World Cup
Third place	1966 England
- * Club domestic league appearances and goals

Fernando da Conceição Cruz (12 August 1940 – 16 August 2025) was a Portuguese professional footballer who played as a left-back, most notably for Benfica and the Portugal national team.

== Club career ==
Born in Lisbon, Cruz was already first choice with Benfica at the age of 20, going on to win eight Primeira Liga championships with the club as well as four Portuguese Cups. He played in all five European Cup finals the side reached in the 60s, winning the 1961 and 1962 editions and appearing in 346 official games during his 11-year stint (one goal).

Cruz ended his professional career in June 1971, after one year with newly-formed Paris Saint-Germain. After leaving France he headed to South America, and later to the United States, working as a manager in the latter nation.

== International career ==
Cruz played 11 matches for Portugal, his first appearance being on 21 May 1961 in a 1–1 friendly draw with England. He was included in Otto Glória's squad for the 1966 FIFA World Cup finals, failing to make an appearance for the third-placed nation.

== Personal life and death ==
Cruz was a supporter of Benfica. In 2008, he was honoured by the club for his achievements, in the presence of his friend and well-known footballer Eusébio.

On 23 September 2012, Cruz acted as "honour guest" of Benfica's supporters association in Canas de Senhorim in the Central Region of Portugal. He died on 16 August 2025 following a long illness, four days after his 85th birthday.

== Honours ==
Benfica

- Primeira Liga: 1959–60, 1960–61, 1962–63, 1963–64, 1964–65, 1966–67, 1967–68, 1968–69
- Taça de Portugal: 1961–62, 1963–64, 1968–69, 1969–70
- European Cup: 1960–61, 1961–62; runner-up 1962–63, 1964–65, 1967–68
- Intercontinental Cup runner-up 1961, 1962

Paris Saint-Germain

- Division 2: 1970–71

Portugal

- FIFA World Cup third-place: 1966
