= 1962 Ballon d'Or =

Annual football award event in France

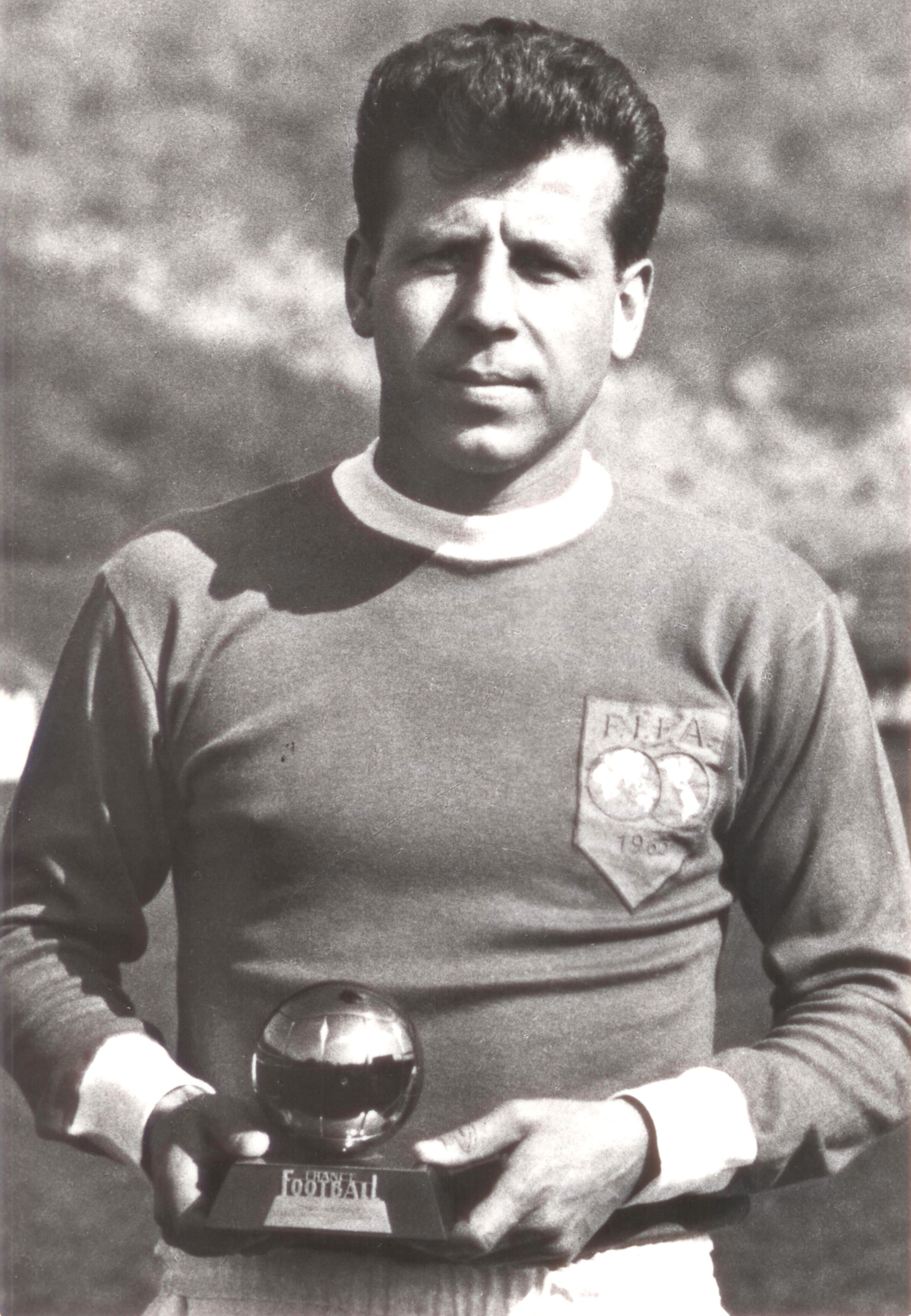
- 1962 Ballon d'Or winner, Josef Masopust
- Date: 18 December 1962
- Location: Paris, France
- Presented by: France Football

Highlights
- Won by: (Czechoslovakia) Josef Masopust (1st award)
- Website: ballondor.com

The 1962 Ballon d'Or, given to the best football player in Europe as judged by a panel of sports journalists from UEFA member countries, was awarded to Josef Masopust on 18 December 1962.

== Rankings ==
Rank	Name	Club(s)	Nationality	Points
1	Josef Masopust	(Czechoslovakia) Dukla Prague	Czechoslovakia	65
2	Eusébio	(Portugal) Benfica	Portugal	53
3	Karl-Heinz Schnellinger	(West Germany) 1. FC Köln	West Germany	33
4	Dragoslav Šekularac	(Socialist Federal Republic of Yugoslavia) Red Star Belgrade	Yugoslavia	26
5	Jef Jurion	(Belgium) Anderlecht	Belgium	15
6	Gianni Rivera	(Italy) Milan	Italy	14
7	Jimmy Greaves	(England) Tottenham Hotspur	England	11
8	John Charles	(Italy) Juventus (England) Leeds United (Italy) Roma	Wales	10
8	Milan Galić	(Socialist Federal Republic of Yugoslavia) Partizan	Yugoslavia	10
10	János Göröcs	(Hungary) Újpest	Hungary	6
11	José Águas	(Portugal) Benfica	Portugal	4
11	Raymond Kopa	(France) Reims	France	4
11	Denis Law	(Italy) Torino (England) Manchester United	Scotland	4
11	Omar Sívori	(Italy) Juventus	Argentina	4
15	Luis del Sol	(Spain) Real Madrid (Italy) Juventus	Spain	3
15	Andrej Kvašňák	(Czechoslovakia) Sparta Prague	Czechoslovakia	3
15	André Lerond	(France) Stade Français	France	3
15	Luis Suárez	(Italy) Internazionale	Spain	3
19	Flórián Albert	(Hungary) Ferencváros	Hungary	2
19	Kurt Hamrin	(Italy) Fiorentina	Sweden	2
19	Horst Nemec	Austria Wien	Austria	2
19	Joaquín Peiró	(Spain) Atlético Madrid (Italy) Torino	Spain	2
19	Viliam Schrojf	(Czechoslovakia) Slovan Bratislava	Czechoslovakia	2
19	Ernő Solymosi	(Hungary) Újpest	Hungary	2
25	Paco Gento	(Spain) Real Madrid	Spain	1
25	Ezio Pascutti	(Italy) Bologna	Italy	1
25	Lajos Tichy	(Hungary) Budapest Honvéd	Hungary	1

Source: France Football
