= 1962 Intercontinental Cup =

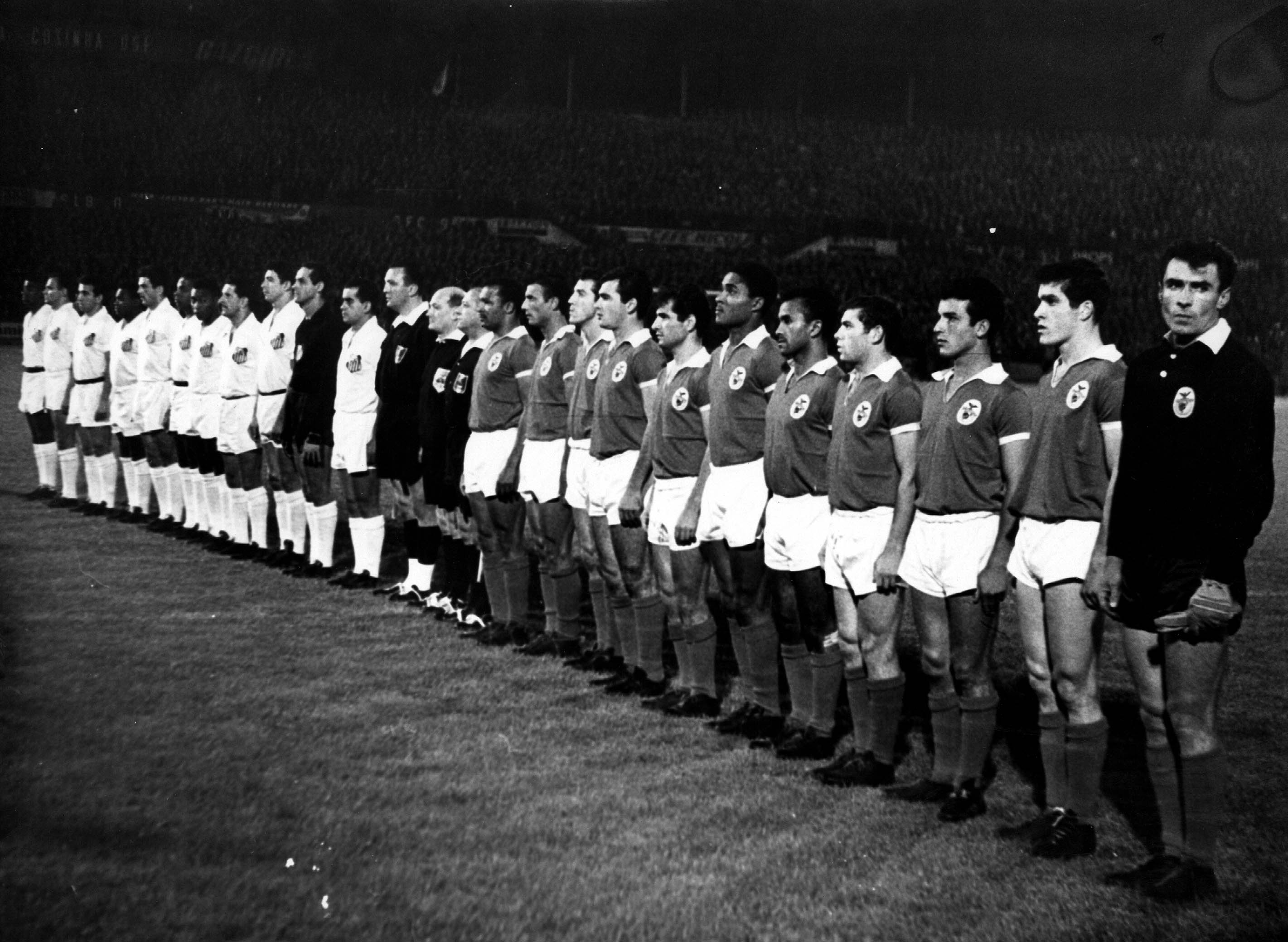
- Both teams lining up before the second match
- Event: Intercontinental Cup
Santos	Benfica
(Brazil)	(Portugal)
- Santos won 4–0 on points

First leg
Santos	Benfica
3	2
- Date: 19 September 1962
- Venue: Maracanã Stadium, Rio de Janeiro
- Referee: Rubén Cabrera (Paraguay)
- Attendance: 85,459

Second leg
Benfica	Santos
2	5
- Date: 11 October 1962
- Venue: Estádio da Luz, Lisbon
- Referee: Pierre Schwinte (France)
- Attendance: 73,000

The 1962 Intercontinental Cup was a football tie held over two legs between Brazilian club Santos, winners of the 1962 Copa Libertadores, and Portuguese club Benfica, winners of the 1961–62 European Cup. Santos won the Intercontinental Cup for the first time.

The tie is remembered as pitching Brazilian player Pelé against Portuguese player Eusébio, two of the leading players of the 1960s, who played against each other on only three occasions. It is considered that the second leg, Santos' 2–5 win in Lisbon, in which Pelé scored a hat-trick, was the greatest performance ever seen in the competition.

== Qualified teams ==
Team	Qualification	Previous finals app.
(Brazil) Santos	1962 Copa Libertadores champion	None
(Portugal) Benfica	1961–62 European Cup champion	1961

Bold indicates winning years

== Match details ==
=== First leg ===
1962 Intercontinental Cup
19 September 1962
First leg

Santos (Brazil)	3–2	(Portugal) Benfica
Pelé 31', 85'; Coutinho 64'	Report	Santana 58', 87'

Maracanã Stadium, Rio de Janeiro
Attendance: 85,459
Referee: Rubén Cabrera (Paraguay)

**Santos**	**Benfica**

GK	1	(Brazil) Gilmar (c)
DF	4	(Brazil) Lima
DF	2	(Brazil) Mauro Ramos
DF	6	(Brazil) Calvet
DF	3	(Brazil) Dalmo
MF	5	(Brazil) Zito
MF	8	(Brazil) Mengálvio
FW	7	(Brazil) Dorval
FW	9	(Brazil) Coutinho
FW	10	(Brazil) Pelé
FW	11	(Brazil) Pepe
Manager:
(Brazil) Lula

GK	1	(Portugal) José Rita
DF	2	(Portugal) Ângelo Martins
DF	3	(Portugal) Raúl Machado
DF	4	(Portugal) Domiciano Cavém
DF	5	(Portugal) Fernando Cruz
MF	6	(Portugal) Humberto Fernandes
FW	10	(Portugal) Mário Coluna (c)
FW	7	(Portugal) José Augusto
FW	8	(Portugal) Santana
FW	9	(Portugal) Eusébio
FW	11	(Portugal) António Simões
Manager:
(Chile) Fernando Riera

=== Second leg ===
11 October 1962
Second leg

Benfica (Portugal)	2–5	(Brazil) Santos
Eusébio 85'; Santana 89'	Report	Pelé 15', 25', 64'; Coutinho 48'; Pepe 77'

Estádio da Luz, Lisbon
Attendance: 73,000
Referee: Pierre Schwinte (France)

**Benfica**	**Santos**

GK	1	(Portugal) Costa Pereira
DF	2	(Portugal) Jacinto Santos
DF	3	(Portugal) Raúl Machado
DF	4	(Portugal) Domiciano Cavém
DF	5	(Portugal) Fernando Cruz
MF	6	(Portugal) Humberto Fernandes
FW	10	(Portugal) Mário Coluna (c)
FW	7	(Portugal) José Augusto
FW	8	(Portugal) Santana
FW	9	(Portugal) Eusébio
FW	11	(Portugal) António Simões
Manager:
(Chile) Fernando Riera

GK	1	(Brazil) Gilmar (c)
DF	4	(Brazil) Olavo
DF	2	(Brazil) Mauro Ramos
DF	6	(Brazil) Calvet
DF	3	(Brazil) Dalmo
MF	5	(Brazil) Zito
MF	8	(Brazil) Lima
FW	7	(Brazil) Dorval
FW	9	(Brazil) Coutinho
FW	10	(Brazil) Pelé
FW	11	(Brazil) Pepe
Manager:
(Brazil) Lula

== See also ==
- S.L. Benfica in international football
- Santos FC in South America
