= Arthur Holland (referee) =

English football referee (1916–1987)

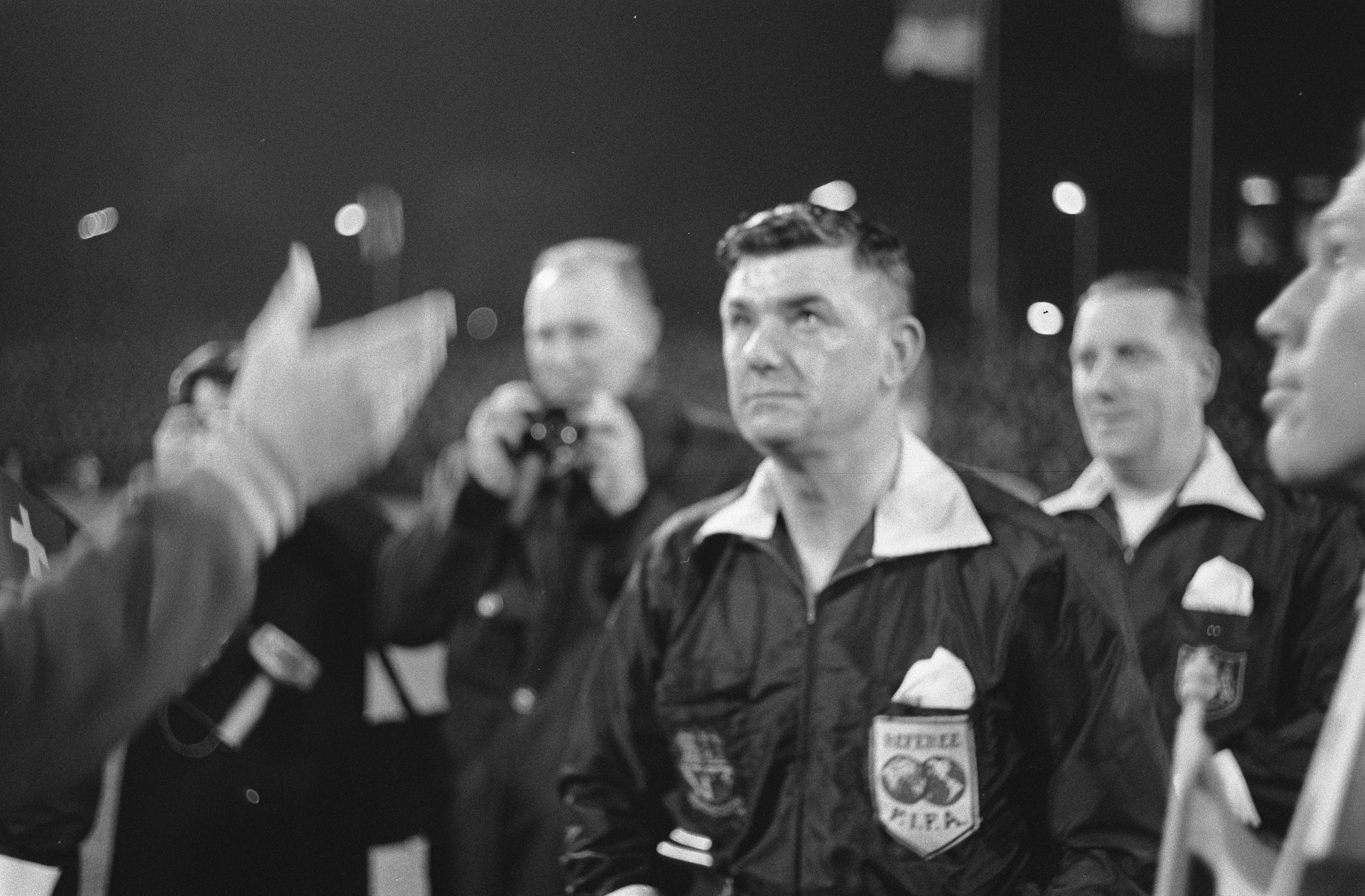
- Arthur Holland in 1964
- Full name: Arthur Holland
- Born: 26 November 1916; Barnsley, Yorkshire, England
- Died: March 1987; Barnsley, Yorkshire, England

International
Years	League	Role
1959–1964	FIFA listed	Referee

Arthur Holland (26 November 1916 – March 1987) was an English football referee.

== Career ==
Born in Barnsley, Holland became a Football League linesman in 1947 and graduated to the Referees List in 1951, taking charge of the FA Amateur Cup Final in 1959. Later, in the same year he was appointed to the FIFA List and later refereed in the 1963 European Cup final between Benfica and Milan. He ended his domestic refereeing career with the 1964 FA Cup final between West Ham United and Preston North End. A few weeks later his final match was the 1964 European Nations' Cup final between Spain and the Soviet Union in Madrid.

Outside football, he worked as a miner from 1935 and after his refereeing retirement as a publican, running The Paddy public house in Kendray, Barnsley.

== Tournaments ==
- 1962–63 European Cup (final)
- 1963–64 FA Cup (final)
- 1964 European Nations' Cup (final)

Preceded by (England) Arthur Ellis	UEFA European Football Championship final match referees 1964 (England) Arthur Holland	Succeeded by (Switzerland) Gottfried Dienst
Preceded by European Cup Final 1962 (Netherlands) Leo Horn	European Cup Referees; Final 1963 (England) Arthur Holland	Succeeded by European Cup Final 1964 (Austria) Josef Stoll
Preceded by Ken Aston	FA Cup Final; 1964	Succeeded by Bill Clements
