= 1961 Intercontinental Cup =

1961 edition of the FIFA Intercontinental Cup

- Event: Intercontinental Cup
Benfica	Peñarol
(Portugal)	(Uruguay)
- 2–2 on points Peñarol won after a play-off

First leg
Benfica	Peñarol
1	0
- Date: 4 September 1961
- Venue: Estádio da Luz, Lisbon
- Referee: Othmar Huber (Switzerland)
- Attendance: 80,451

Second leg
Peñarol	Benfica
5	0
- Date: 17 September 1961
- Venue: Estadio Centenario, Montevideo
- Referee: Carlos Nai Foino (Argentina)
- Attendance: 56,358

Play-off
Peñarol	Benfica
2	1
- Date: 19 September 1961
- Venue: Estadio Centenario, Montevideo
- Referee: José Luis Praddaude (Argentina)
- Attendance: 60,241

The 1961 Intercontinental Cup was a football match between Uruguayan club Peñarol, winners of the 1961 Copa Libertadores, and Portuguese club Benfica, winners of the 1960–61 European Cup. Peñarol won the Intercontinental Cup for the first time.

A play-off was needed due to the rules at the time that awarded 2 points for each victory and both teams having won one game each.

== Qualified teams ==
Team	Qualification	Previous finals app.
(Uruguay) Peñarol	1961 Copa Libertadores champion	1960
(Portugal) Benfica	1960–61 European Cup champion	None

Bold indicates winning years

== Match details ==
=== First leg ===
1961 Intercontinental Cup
4 September 1961
First leg

Benfica (Portugal)	1–0	(Uruguay) Peñarol
Coluna 60'	Report

Estádio da Luz, Lisbon
Attendance: 80,451
Referee: Othmar Huber (Switzerland)

=== Second leg ===
17 September 1961
Second leg

Peñarol (Uruguay)	5–0	(Portugal) Benfica
Sasía 10' (pen.); Joya 18', 28'; Spencer 42', 58'	Report

Estadio Centenario, Montevideo
Attendance: 56,358
Referee: Carlos Nai Foino (Argentina)

=== Play-off ===
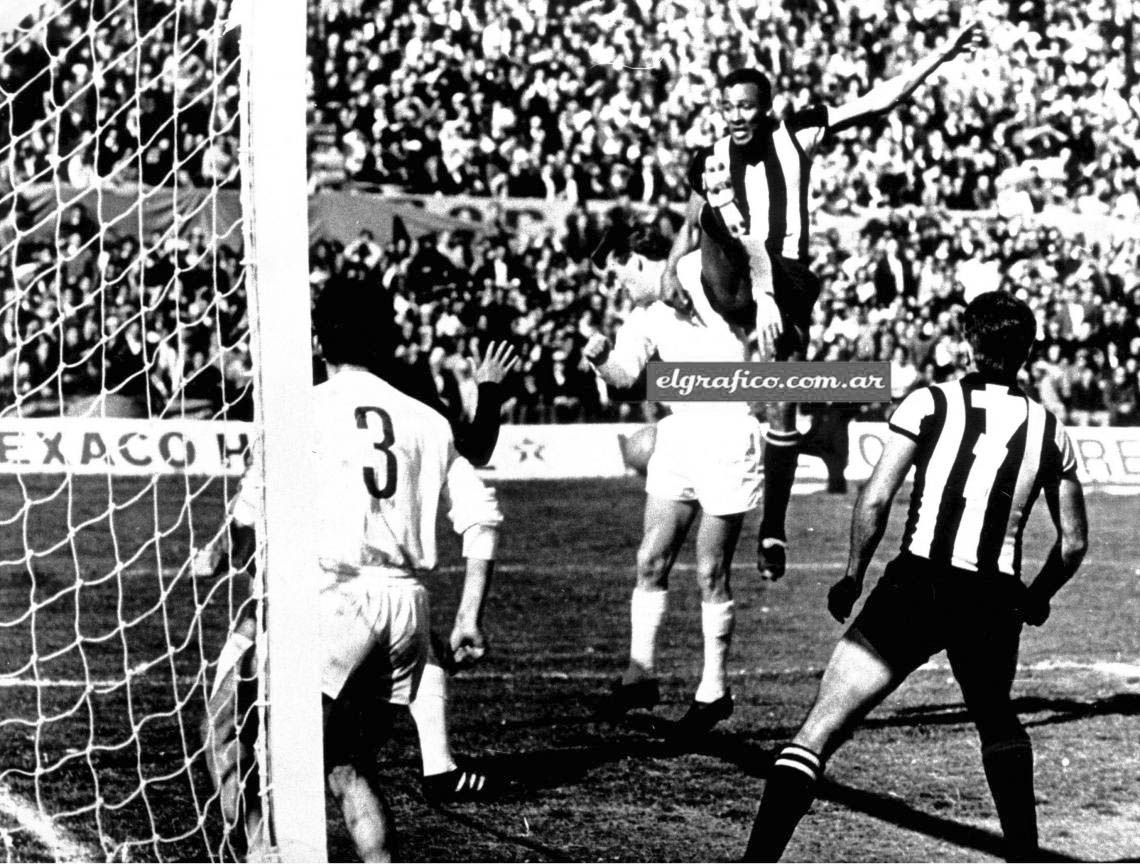
José Sasía scoring one of his two goals for Peñarol

19 September 1961
Playoff

Peñarol (Uruguay)	2–1	(Portugal) Benfica
Sasía 5', 40' (pen.)	Report	Eusébio 35'

Estadio Centenario, Montevideo
Attendance: 60,241
Referee: José Luis Praddaude (Argentina)

**Peñarol**	**Benfica**

GK	**1**	(Uruguay) Luis Maidana
DF		(Uruguay) William Martínez (c)
DF		(Uruguay) Núber Cano
MF		(Uruguay) Edgardo González
MF		(Uruguay) Néstor Gonçalves
MF		(Uruguay) Wálter Aguerre
FW	**7**	(Uruguay) Luis Cubilla
FW		(Uruguay) Ernesto Ledesma
FW		(Uruguay) José Sasía
FW	**9**	(Ecuador) Alberto Spencer
FW		(Peru) Juan Joya
Manager:
(Uruguay) Roberto Scarone

GK	**1**	(Portugal) Costa Pereira
DF		(Portugal) Ângelo Martins
DF		(Portugal) Humberto Fernandes
MF		(Portugal) Fernando Cruz
MF		(Portugal) José Neto
MF		(Portugal) Domiciano Cavém
FW		(Portugal) José Augusto
FW	**10**	(Portugal) Eusébio
FW		(Portugal) José Águas
FW		(Portugal) Mário Coluna (c)
FW		(Portugal) António Simões
Manager:
(Hungary) Béla Guttmann

== See also ==
- 1960–61 European Cup
- 1961 Copa Libertadores
- S.L. Benfica in international football
