= José Rita =

Portuguese footballer

Zé Rita
Personal information
- Full name: José Bartolomeu Barrocal Rita dos Mártires
- Date of birth: 2 April 1932
- Place of birth: Vila Real de Santo António, Portugal
- Date of death: 2001
- Place of death: Cotia, Brazil
- Position: Goalkeeper

Senior career*
| Years | Team | Apps | (Gls) |
| 1950–1952 | Olhanense | 19 | (0) |
| 1952–1955 | Sporting CP | 0 | (0) |
| 1955–1962 | Covilhã | 129 | (0) |
| 1962–1964 | Benfica | 1 | (0) |
| 1964–1966 | Casa Pia | 0 | (0) |
- * Club domestic league appearances and goals

José Bartolomeu Barrocal Rita dos Mártires (2 April 1932 – deceased), commonly known as Zé Rita, was a Portuguese footballer who played as a goalkeeper.

== Honours ==
Benfica

- Intercontinental Cup runner-up: 1962
