= Fernando Riera =

Chilean footballer (1920-2010)

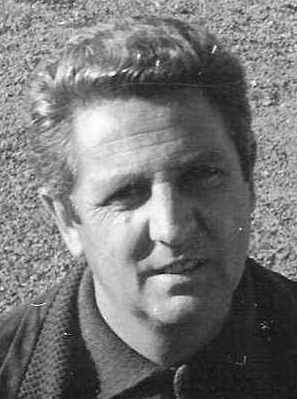
- Riera in 1963

Personal information
- Full name: Fernando José Riera Bauzá
- Date of birth: 27 June 1920
- Place of birth: Santiago, Chile
- Date of death: 23 September 2010 (aged 90)
- Place of death: Santiago, Chile
- Positions: Forward; left wing

Youth career
- Unión Española

Senior career*
Years	Team	Apps	(Gls)
1937–1938	Unión Española		
1939–1950	Universidad Católica		
1950–1952	Reims		
1953	Vasco CCS		
1953–1954	Rouen		

International career
1942–1950	Chile	17	(4)

Managerial career
- 1954–1957: Belenenses
- 1957–1962: Chile
- 1958: Chile U20
- 1962–1963: Benfica
- 1963–1966: Universidad Católica
- 1966: Nacional
- 1966–1967: Benfica
- 1968: Universidad Católica
- 1969–1970: Espanyol
- 1970–1971: Chile
- 1971–1972: Boca Juniors
- 1972–1973: Porto
- 1973: Deportivo La Coruña
- 1974: Marseille
- 1974–1975: Sporting CP
- 1975–1976: Monterrey
- 1977: Palestino
- 1977–1978: Monterrey
- 1978–1982: Universidad de Chile
- 1983–1984: Everton
- 1985–1988: Universidad de Chile
- 1988–1989: Monterrey
- * Club domestic league appearances and goals

Fernando José Riera Bauzá (27 June 1920 – 23 September 2010) was a Chilean professional football player and manager, patriarch of Chilean football.

== Career ==
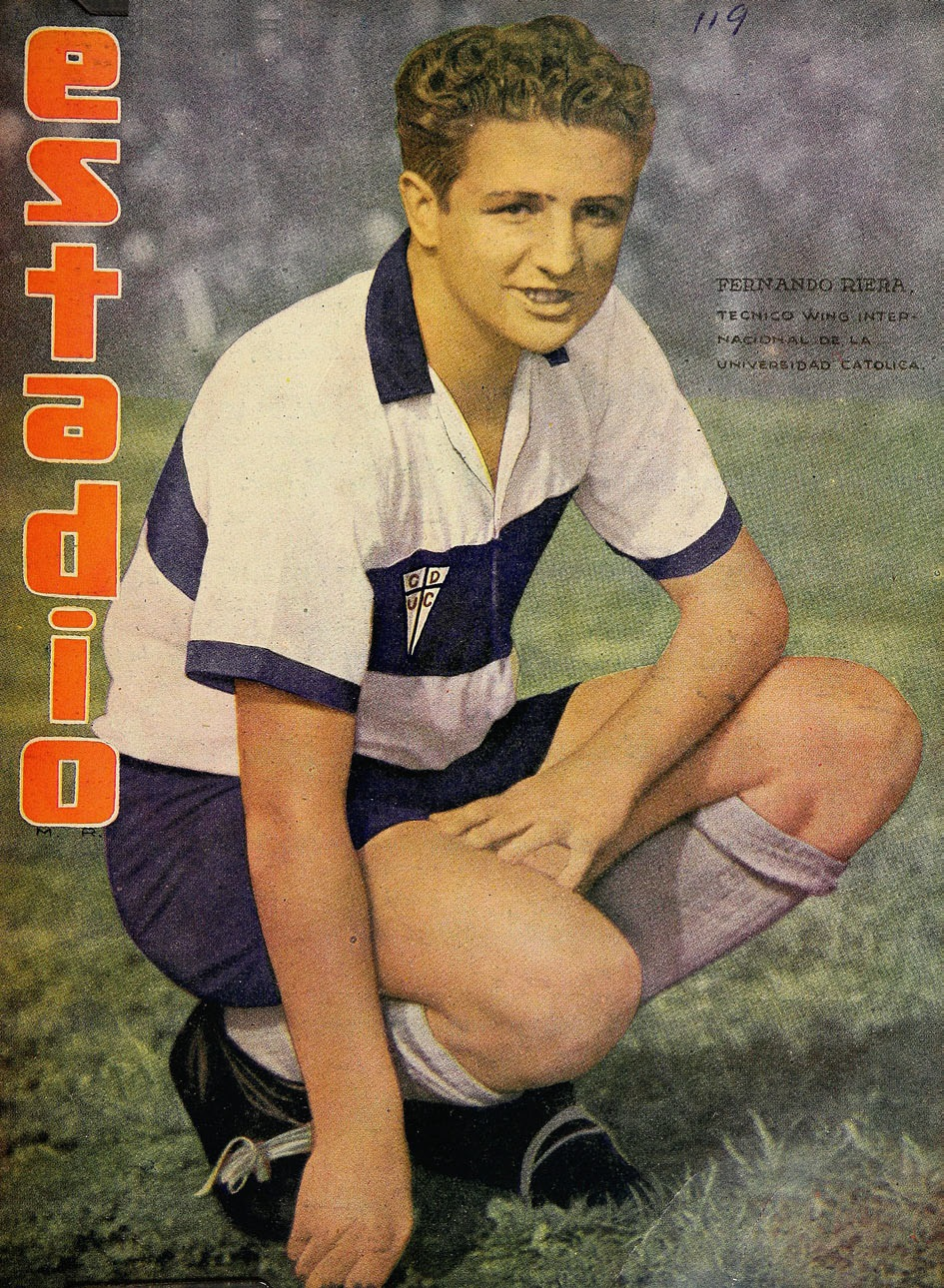
Fernando Riera as a player of Universidad Católica

Riera was born in Santiago, Chile. As a footballer, he played for Chile in the 1942, 1947 and 1949 Copa Américas. He also played at the 1950 FIFA World Cup, and managed them on home soil to a third place in the 1962 World Cup. In 1962–63, Riera led Portuguese side Benfica to the Primeira Liga title. He returned to the club in 1966 and led them to another champions title. In the 1963 England v Rest of the World football match, Riera coached the FIFA World XI team; it was the first FIFA XI team in the history of the game. In Chile, he left a legacy with disciple coaches such as Arturo Salah and Manuel Pellegrini, leaving a tradition and an identity for Chilean football.

== Personal life ==
Through his sister Juanita Riera Bauzá, Riera was the great-uncle of Javiera Balmaceda, Pedro Pascal and Lux Pascal.

On 23 September 2010, Riera died in Santiago of an apparent heart attack.

== Honours ==
Benfica

- Primeira Liga: 1962–63, 1966–67
- European Cup runner-up: 1962–63
- Intercontinental Cup runner-up: 1962

Chile

- FIFA World Cup third place: 1962

Awards and achievements
Preceded by (Sweden) George Raynor (England)	FIFA World Cup host country managers 1962	Succeeded by (England) Alf Ramsey
