= Taça de Honra =

Taça de Honra (Honour Cup) is a Portuguese friendly football tournament played between teams of the Lisbon Football Association (AFL). It is the third oldest competition in Portugal after the championships of Lisbon and Porto. The format has varied, and before the 1959–60 season, the trophy was mostly given to the winner of the Lisbon championship. Afterwards, it was played as a four-team elimination tournament during pre-season, between the best-placed Lisbon teams in championships disputed in the previous season. After 20 years of inactivity, the competition returned for two years: 2014 and 2015.

== History ==
During the 1920–21 and 1946–47 seasons, the Lisbon Football Association indexed the conquest of the Lisbon regional championship to the conquest of the Honour Cup. It was decided a club that had won the regional championship would receive an Honour Cup, even if the Cup had not been played. In 1920–21, Casa Pia got a place in the winners list (even though they did not compete) because they won the regional championship. In 1921–22, S.L. Benfica won the cup, but it was Sporting CP that got a place in the winners list by winning the regional championship.

== Winners ==
A list of all the Honour Cup finals is shown below with the final results, without the indexation of the regional championship.

Edition	Season	Stadium	Winners	Runners-up	Final
1st	1914–15	Sete Rios	Sporting CP	SL Benfica	3–1
2nd	1915–16	Stadium	Sporting CP	SL Benfica	1–0
3rd	1916–17	Sete Rios	Sporting CP	SL Benfica	4–1
4th	1917–18	Stadium	Império Lisboa Clube	Sporting CP	4–3
5th	1919–20	Campo Grande	SL Benfica	CIF	5–0
6th	1921–22	Campo Grande	SL Benfica	Vitória de Setúbal	3–1
7th	1947–48		Sporting CP		Tournament with 6 clubs in 10 games (two rounds) with SCP winning it with 25 Points (6V-3D-1L)
8th	1959–60	E. Nacional	CF Os Belenenses	Sporting CP	1–0
9th	1960–61	E. Nacional	CF Os Belenenses	Atlético CP	2–0
10th	1961–62	E. Nacional	Sporting CP	SL Benfica	3–0
11th	1962–63	Restelo	SL Benfica	Atlético CP	3–1
12th	1963–64	Restelo	Sporting CP	SL Benfica	3–0
13th	1964–65	Restelo	SL Benfica	CF Os Belenenses	7–1
14th	1965–66	Restelo	Sporting CP	SL Benfica	2–1
15th	1966–67	Restelo	SL Benfica	Sporting CP	2–0
16th	1967–68	José Alvalade	SL Benfica	Atlético CP	6–0
17th	1968–69	Restelo	SL Benfica	Sporting CP	3–0
18th	1969–70	Restelo	CF Os Belenenses	SL Benfica	1–1 (Defeat by corner kicks)
19th	1970–71	José Alvalade	Sporting CP	CF Os Belenenses	1–0
20th	1971–72	Restelo	SL Benfica	CF Os Belenenses	4–1
21st	1972–73	Restelo	SL Benfica	Atlético CP	1–1 (4–2 in penalties)
22nd	1973–74		SL Benfica		Tournament with 3 games (one round) with SLB winning it with 6 points (3V)
23rd	1974–75	Restelo	SL Benfica	Sporting CP	1–0
24th	1975–76		CF Os Belenenses		Tournament of 4 games with CFB winning it with 7 points (3V-1D)
25th	1977–78	Restelo	SL Benfica	Sporting CP	0–0 (7–6 in penalties)
26th	1978–79	Restelo	SL Benfica	Sporting CP	2–1
27th	1979–80	José Alvalade	SL Benfica	CF Os Belenenses	3–2
28th	1981–82	Restelo	SL Benfica	GD Estoril Praia	1–0
29th	1983–84	Restelo	SL Benfica	CF Os Belenenses	1–0
30th	1984–85	Restelo	Sporting CP	SL Benfica	2–1
31st	1985–86	Restelo	SL Benfica	CF Os Belenenses	1–0
32nd	1987–88	Luz	SL Benfica	Oriental	2–0
33rd	1989–90	Restelo	CF Os Belenenses	Sporting CP	2–1
34th	1990–91	Luz	Sporting CP	SL Benfica	1–0
35th	1991–92	José Alvalade	Sporting CP	SL Benfica	1–0
36th	1993–94	Restelo	CF Os Belenenses	CF Estrela Amadora	2–1 (after extra-time)
37th	2013–14	Amoreira	Sporting CP	GD Estoril Praia	3–3 (7–6 in penalties)
38th	2014–15	Restelo	Sporting CP	SL Benfica	1–0

== Performance by club ==
Club	Titles	2nd
SL Benfica	18	11
Sporting CP	13	8
CF Os Belenenses	6	6
Império Lisboa Clube	1	0
Atlético CP	0	4
GD Estoril Praia	0	2
CF Estrela Amadora	0	1
Oriental	0	1
Vitória de Setúbal	0	1
CIF	0	1
No final	-	3
