= 1968–69 Primeira Divisão =

35th season of top-tier Portuguese football

Primeira Liga
- Season: 1968–69
- Champions: Benfica; 17th title
- Matches: 182
- Goals: 466 (2.56 per match)

The 1968–69 Primeira Divisão was the 35th season of top-tier football in Portugal.

== Overview ==
It was contested by 14 teams, and S.L. Benfica won the championship.

== League standings ==
Pos	Team	Pld	W	D	L	GF	GA	GD	Pts	Qualification or relegation
1	Benfica (C)	26	16	7	3	49	17	+32	39	Qualification to European Cup first round
2	Porto	26	15	7	4	39	23	+16	37	Qualification to Inter-Cities Fairs Cup first round
3	Vitória de Guimarães	26	13	10	3	46	17	+29	36	Qualification to Inter-Cities Fairs Cup first round
4	Vitória de Setúbal	26	13	9	4	45	20	+25	35	Qualification to Inter-Cities Fairs Cup first round
5	Sporting CP	26	11	8	7	35	20	+15	30	Qualification to Inter-Cities Fairs Cup first round
6	Académica	26	12	6	8	48	32	+16	30	Qualification to Cup Winners' Cup first round
7	CUF Barreiro	26	8	11	7	32	30	+2	27	
8	Belenenses	26	8	10	8	31	33	−2	26	
9	Varzim	26	7	8	11	32	49	−17	22	
10	União de Tomar	26	7	7	12	27	47	−20	21	
11	Leixões	26	7	7	12	21	30	−9	21	
12	Braga	26	6	7	13	20	47	−27	19	
13	Atlético CP (R)	26	5	2	19	26	49	−23	12	Relegation to Segunda Divisão
14	Sanjoanense (R)	26	3	3	20	15	52	−37	9	Relegation to Segunda Divisão

Source: RSSSF
(C) Champions; (R) Relegated

== Results ==
Home \ Away	ACA	ACP	BEL	BEN	BRA	CUF	LEI	POR	SJN	SCP	UTO	VAR	VGU	VSE
Académica		4–2	2–0	0–2	6–2	1–1	5–0	2–4	2–0	1–0	4–0	0–0	1–1	2–1
Atlético CP	0–4		3–1	0–2	1–2	1–1	1–0	1–2	4–0	0–1	0–1	0–2	0–3	0–1
Belenenses	1–1	2–1		1–2	1–0	1–1	2–1	1–1	0–0	0–0	2–2	4–1	1–0	0–2
Benfica	3–2	4–3	4–1		5–0	1–0	4–0	0–0	5–0	0–0	4–0	3–1	0–0	2–1
Braga	0–0	2–1	1–4	0–1		1–1	0–1	1–1	1–0	1–4	2–1	1–0	0–0	1–0
CUF Barreiro	4–3	1–3	1–1	3–0	1–1		1–0	0–1	3–0	1–0	2–0	2–0	1–1	0–3
Leixões	1–1	0–1	0–0	0–0	2–0	2–1		0–1	3–0	1–0	1–2	2–0	1–1	1–2
Porto	0–1	4–1	1–0	1–0	1–0	3–0	2–1		2–1	1–1	2–2	2–0	2–1	3–2
Sanjoanense	0–1	1–0	2–3	0–1	1–0	0–1	0–1	0–0		1–2	4–1	1–2	1–1	1–4
Sporting CP	3–0	4–2	3–2	0–0	3–0	1–1	1–0	2–1	1–0		1–1	5–0	0–0	0–1
União de Tomar	2–1	1–1	0–1	0–4	1–1	1–1	2–0	0–2	3–0	2–1		1–3	3–1	0–0
Varzim	1–2	1–0	1–1	1–1	3–3	2–2	2–2	1–1	3–2	2–1	2–1		0–5	1–1
Vitória de Guimarães	2–1	1–0	2–0	2–0	5–0	2–1	0–0	2–0	5–0	2–1	3–0	4–2		1–1
Vitória de Setúbal	2–1	4–0	1–1	1–1	3–0	1–1	1–1	3–1	3–0	0–0	4–0	2–1	1–1	

Legend: Blue = home team win; Yellow = draw; Red = away team win.
