= 1966–67 Primeira Divisão =

33rd season of top-tier Portuguese football

Primeira Liga
- Season: 1966–67
- Champions: Benfica; 15th title
- Matches: 182
- Goals: 481 (2.64 per match)
- Top goalscorer: Eusébio (31 goals)

The 1966–67 Primeira Divisão was the 33rd season of top-tier football in Portugal.

== Overview ==
It was contested by 14 teams, and S.L. Benfica won the championship.

== League standings ==
Pos	Team	Pld	W	D	L	GF	GA	GD	Pts	Qualification or relegation
1	Benfica (C)	26	20	3	3	64	19	+45	43	Qualification to European Cup first round
2	Académica	26	18	4	4	50	18	+32	40	
3	Porto	26	17	5	4	56	22	+34	39	Qualification to Inter-Cities Fairs Cup first round
4	Sporting CP	26	11	8	7	36	24	+12	30	Qualification to Inter-Cities Fairs Cup first round
5	Vitória de Setúbal	26	10	7	9	27	25	+2	27	Qualification to Cup Winners' Cup first round
6	Vitória de Guimarães	26	11	4	11	35	40	−5	26	
7	Leixões	26	8	8	10	23	29	−6	24	
8	CUF Barreiro	26	9	5	12	27	43	−16	23	Qualification to Inter-Cities Fairs Cup first round
9	Braga	26	9	5	12	33	33	0	23	
10	Varzim	26	8	6	12	29	42	−13	22	
11	Belenenses	26	7	6	13	26	34	−8	20	
12	Sanjoanense	26	4	11	11	23	39	−16	19	
13	Atlético CP (R)	26	5	4	17	29	55	−26	14	Relegation to Segunda Divisão
14	Beira-Mar (R)	26	5	4	17	23	58	−35	14	Relegation to Segunda Divisão

Source: RSSSF
(C) Champions; (R) Relegated

== Results ==
Home \ Away	ACA	ACP	BEM	BEL	BEN	BRA	CUF	LEI	POR	SJN	SCP	VAR	VGU	VSE
Académica		1–0	5–0	6–0	0–1	2–1	2–3	2–1	0–0	5–3	1–0	2–1	2–1	3–0
Atlético CP	0–2		3–0	2–1	1–2	0–1	0–0	2–2	2–0	2–2	0–1	4–1	1–2	0–2
Beira Mar	0–3	4–1		1–0	0–9	0–0	2–0	3–0	0–2	1–1	1–2	2–4	1–3	0–0
Belenenses	0–1	7–1	0–2		2–1	1–0	5–0	0–0	1–2	1–1	1–1	2–0	2–1	0–2
Benfica	2–1	2–0	2–0	2–0		4–0	3–0	3–1	3–0	1–0	3–0	6–2	7–0	1–0
Braga	1–3	1–0	4–2	4–1	4–0		1–1	1–2	2–0	1–0	3–1	1–1	2–3	2–3
CUF Barreiro	0–2	4–3	1–0	2–0	1–2	1–0		0–1	1–5	0–0	1–3	2–0	2–2	1–0
Leixões	1–1	3–1	4–1	0–0	1–2	1–0	0–0		0–1	1–0	0–1	2–0	0–1	1–1
Porto	1–1	5–1	4–1	2–0	1–1	3–1	5–0	4–0		4–1	1–0	3–1	4–1	2–0
Sanjoanense	1–0	2–2	1–0	0–0	1–3	0–0	0–4	2–0	1–1		1–1	1–3	2–1	1–1
Sporting CP	0–0	3–1	2–0	1–0	1–1	0–0	0–1	0–1	2–2	4–1		4–0	3–0	1–1
Varzim	1–3	5–0	1–0	0–0	0–0	1–0	1–0	1–1	0–3	1–0	2–2		1–0	0–1
Vitória de Guimarães	0–1	2–0	1–1	1–2	0–1	2–1	3–1	2–0	2–0	2–1	2–1	2–2		1–1
Vitória de Setúbal	0–1	0–2	5–1	1–0	3–2	1–2	3–1	0–0	0–1	0–0	0–2	1–0	1–0	

Legend: Blue = home team win; Yellow = draw; Red = away team win.
