= 1960–61 S.L. Benfica season =

Benfica
1960–61 season
- President: Maurício Vieira de Brito
- Head coach: Béla Guttmann
- Stadium: Estádio da Luz
- Primeira Divisão: 1st
- Taça de Portugal: Third round
- European Cup: Winners
- Top goalscorer: League: José Águas (27); All: José Águas (43)
- Biggest win: Benfica 8–0 Sporting da Covilhã (14 May 1961)
- Biggest defeat: Vitória de Setúbal 4–1 Benfica (1 June 1961)
Home colours	Away colours

The 1960–61 season was Sport Lisboa e Benfica's 57th season in existence and the club's 27th consecutive season in the top flight of Portuguese football, covering the period from 1 August 1960 to 30 July 1961. Benfica competed domestically in the Primeira Divisão and the Taça de Portugal and participated in the European Cup after winning the previous league.

After promising to win the European Cup the year before, Guttmann made almost no changes, only signing centre-back Germano. A dominant league campaign saw Benfica lap the first half with 12 wins in 13 games. A loss in January did not stop their momentum, and they added five more wins in the following weeks. On day 22, they drew with Sporting, and a week later they sealed their second consecutive league title. José Águas scored a league best 27 goals. Meanwhile, in Europe, Benfica defeated Hearts, Újpesti Dózsa, and AGF on their way to a semi-final with Rapid Wien. They won three-nil at home and drew one-all in Vienna, qualifying for the European Cup final, where they would meet favourites Barcelona. A 3–2 win secured their historic first European Cup.

== Season summary ==
After Béla Guttmann led Benfica to the league title in 1959–60, he set his eyes on winning the European Cup, a promise he made when he first arrived at Benfica. In his second year, he recruited Fernando Caiado as assistant, due to his connection with the players, and said to him: "Caiado, help me because I am going to make Benfica the European Champion". He only made one signing for the first team, centre-back, Germano. The season began on 27 August with a game against Barreirense. After other matches, Benfica ended the pre-season with the Taça de Honra, which they finished third. Despite the focus in Europe, Benfica domestic performance was dominant with 12 wins and one draw in the first half of the league. At the same time, they eliminated Hearts in the preliminary round of the European Cup, and Újpesti Dózsa in the first round. In the first leg, at home, Benfica build up a 5–0 lead in 28 minutes. The second half of the league was less imposing, with Benfica conceding their first loss with Vitória de Guimarães. This was followed by five consecutive wins. In Europe, they had no difficulties in quarter-finals with the Danish AGF, beating them by 4–1 at their own home. In April, Benfica wrapped up the league, after drawing with Sporting CP on match-day 22, keeping a five-point lead. A week later, they beat Braga by 7–1 and won the league with three match-days to go, a new club record. José Águas was Bola de Prata for league top-scorer with 27 goals.

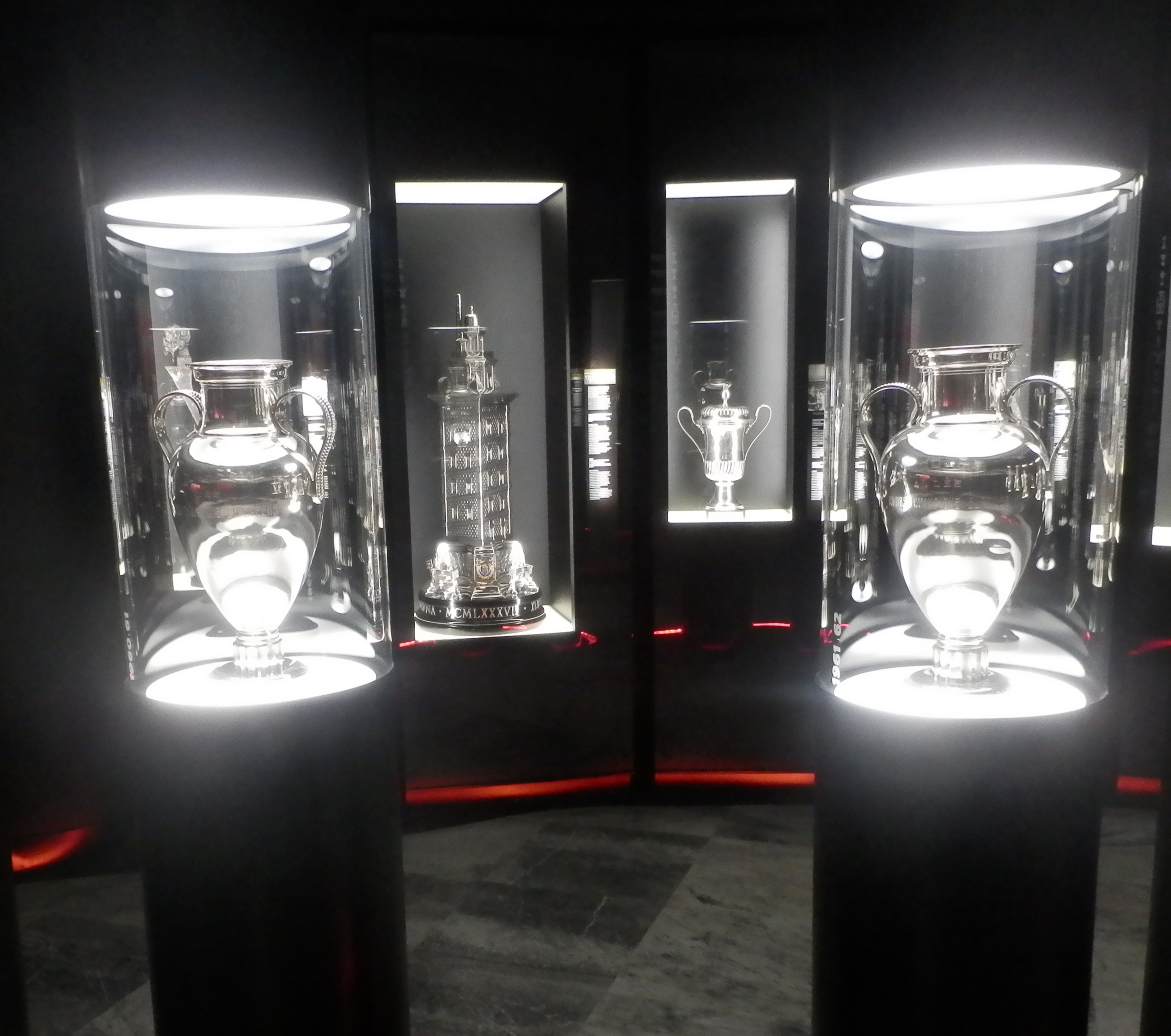
The 1961 and '62 European Cup trophies on display at Museu Cosme Damião

With the league conquered, Benfica met Rapid Wien in semi-finals, beating them at home by 3–0. In Vienna, the match was abandoned on the 88th minute, with the score on 1–1, after Rapid fans invaded the pitch. Qualified for the European Cup final, they would face favourites FC Barcelona, who had eliminated five-time winners and title-holders Real Madrid. On 31 May 1961, Barcelona scored first, but Benfica levelled by José Águas after a cross from Cavém. In the next minute, José Neto set up a long ball for Santana, with Barcelona defender, Enric Gensana heading it backwards into his own goal. In the second half, Cavém crossed another ball from the left, reaching Coluna, who waited at the front of the box, to score the 3–1. Barcelona brought it down to 3–2, but no more goals occurred with Benfica winning their first ever European Cup. Benfica played the second leg of the third round of the Portuguese Cup the very next day, with all the team still in Vienna, because the Portuguese Football Federation (FPF) would not postpone it. Entirely composed of reserve players, it marked the debut of Eusébio after five months of legal battle for his signing. He scored once, and Benfica lost 4–1. The season final game was with Belenenses in which Benfica won, therefore ending the league with a four-point lead over Sporting and 13 over Porto.

== Competitions ==
Win Draw Loss Postponed

=== Overall record ===
Competition	First match	Last match	Record								
Competition	First match	Last match	G	W	D	L	GF	GA	GD	Win %	Source
Primeira Divisão	18 September 1960	8 June 1961	26	22	2	2	92	21	+71	84.62	
Taça de Portugal	29 January 1961	1 June 1961	6	5	0	1	26	9	+17	83.33	
European Cup	29 September 1960	31 May 1961	9	7	1	1	26	10	+16	77.78	
Total			41	34	3	4	144	40	+104	82.93	

=== Primeira Divisão ===
==== League table ====
Pos	Team	Pld	W	D	L	GF	GA	GD	Pts	Qualification or relegation
1	Benfica (C)	26	22	2	2	92	21	+71	46	Qualified for the European Cup
2	Sporting CP (Note: Sporting CP qualified because Benfica were title holders in the European Cup.)	26	19	4	3	61	19	+42	42	Qualified for the European Cup
3	Porto	26	14	5	7	51	28	+23	33	
4	Vitória de Guimarães	26	14	2	10	48	44	+4	30	
5	Belenenses	26	12	4	10	45	37	+8	28	Invited for the Inter-Cities Fairs Cup

Source: RSSSF
(C) Champions

==== Results by round ====
Round	1	2	3	4	5	6	7	8	9	10	11	12	13	14	15	16	17	18	19	20	21	22	23	24	25	26
Ground	A	H	H	A	H	A	H	A	H	A	H	A	H	H	A	A	H	A	H	A	H	A	H	A	H	A
Result	W	W	W	W	W	D	W	W	W	W	W	W	W	W	W	L	W	W	W	W	W	D	W	L	W	W
Position	6	1	1	1	1	1	1	1	1	1	1	1	1	1	1	1	1	1	1	1	1	1	1	1	1	1

Source: ForaDeJogo
A = Away; H = Home; W = Win; D = Draw; L = Loss

==== Matches ====
18 September 1960 1	Barreirense	0–1	Benfica	Barreiro
16:00			76' José Águas	Stadium: Campo D. Manuel de Melo; Referee: Clemente Henriques

25 September 1960 2	Benfica	4–1	Académica de Coimbra	Lisbon
15:00	Cavém 10', 16'; José Augusto 3 0'; José Torres 83'		29' Jorge Humberto	Stadium: Estádio da Luz; Attendance: 40,000; Referee: Pinto Ferreira

2 October 1960 3	Benfica	4–0	Vitória de Guimarães	Lisbon
16:00	Santana 12'; José Augusto 27'; Cavém 60'; Coluna 70'			Stadium: Estádio da Luz; Attendance: 40,000; Referee: Mário Mendonça

16 October 1960 4	Salgueiros	0–2	Benfica	Porto
15:00			10', 86' José Águas	Stadium: Estádio Engenheiro Vidal Pinheiro; Attendance: 20,000; Referee: Porfírio da Silva

23 October 1960 5	Benfica	4–1	Leixões	Lisbon
16:00	José Águas 11', 63'; Germano 30'; José Augusto 88'		33' António Medeiros	Stadium: Estádio da Luz; Attendance: 30,000; Referee: Virgilio Baptista

30 October 1960 6	Atlético	3–3	Benfica	Lisbon
15:00	Pedro Silva 1'; Fonseca 12'; Angeja 83'		26' José Augusto; 62' Coluna; 88' Cavém	Stadium: Estádio da Tapadinha; Attendance: 10,000; Referee: Mário Mendonça

13 November 1960 7	Benfica	5–0	Lusitano de Èvora	Lisbon
16:00	José Águas 19', 23', 83'; Cavém 42', 57'			Stadium: Estádio da Luz; Attendance: 40,000; Referee: Mário Costa

20 November 1960 8	CUF	1–3	Benfica	Barreiro
16:00	José Carlos 52'		44', 83' José Águas; 55' José Augusto	Stadium: Complexo Desportivo Alfredo da Silva; Attendance: 5,000; Referee: Abel da Costa

27 November 1960 9	Benfica	1–0	Sporting	Lisbon
15:00	Santana 22'			Stadium: Estádio da Luz; Attendance: 70,000; Referee: Viriato Maximiano

4 December 1960 10	Braga	0–4	Benfica	Braga
16:00			11', 18', 51' Santana; 15' António Mendes	Stadium: Estádio 28 de Maio; Attendance: 30,000; Referee: Caetano Nogueira

11 December 1960 11	Benfica	2–0	Porto	Lisbon
16:00	José Águas 21', 59'			Stadium: Estádio da Luz; Attendance: 70,000; Referee: Edmundo Carvalho

18 December 1960 12	Sporting da Covilhã	1–3	Benfica	Covilhã
15:00	Martinho de Matos 5'		20' Santana; 34', 65' José Águas	Stadium: Estádio Municipal José Santos Pinto; Attendance: 25,000; Referee: Braga Barros

1 January 1961 13	Benfica	4–2	Belenenses	Lisbon
15:00	José Augusto 32'; Santana 35'; José Águas 43', 51'		2', 16' Yaúca	Stadium: Estádio da Luz; Attendance: 40,000; Referee: Francisco Guerra

8 January 1961 14	Benfica	3–0	Barreirense	Lisbon
16:00	José Augusto 22'; Cavém 23'; José Águas 75'			Stadium: Estádio da Luz; Attendance: 50,000; Referee: José Simões

15 January 1961 15	Académica de Coimbra	0–2	Benfica	Coimbra
16:00			29', 83' José Augusto	Stadium: Estádio Municipal de Coimbra; Attendance: 20,000; Referee: Marcos Lobato

22 January 1961 16	Vitória de Guimarães	2–1	Benfica	Guimarães
15:00	Pedras 40'; Augusto Silva 52'		30' Santana	Stadium: Estádio D. Afonso Henriques; Attendance: 30,000; Referee: Clemente Henriques

5 February 1961 17	Benfica	8–1	Salgueiros	Lisbon
16:00	José Augusto 2', 15'; Germano 8' (pen.); Cavém 10', 64'; José Águas 67', 89'; Santana 81'		40' Chau	Stadium: Estádio da Luz; Attendance: 40,000; Referee: Álvaro Rodrigues

5 February 1961 18	Leixões	0–3	Benfica	Matosinhos
16:00			25' José Águas; 47' Cavém; 53' José Augusto	Stadium: Estádio do Mar; Attendance: 20,000; Referee: Encarnação Salgado

19 February 1961 19	Benfica	7–2	Atlético	Lisbon
16:00	José Águas 13', 18', 44'; Coluna 46'; José Augusto 65'; Santana 79', 87'		63' Angeja; 83' Orlando	Stadium: Estádio da Luz; Attendance: 30,000; Referee: Raul Martins

5 March 1961 20	Lusitano de Èvora	1–2	Benfica	Évora
15:00	José Pedro Bilau 90'		19' Cavém; 66' José Augusto	Stadium: Campo da Estrela; Attendance: 20,000; Referee: Inácio Tereso

12 March 1961 21	Benfica	4–1	CUF	Lisbon
16:00	José Augusto 30' (pen.), 75'; Cavém 57'; Santana 79'		86' Salvador	Stadium: Estádio da Luz; Attendance: 40,000; Referee: Renato Santos

9 April 1961 22	Sporting	1–1	Benfica	Lisbon
16:00	Ernesto Figueiredo 66'		54' José Augusto	Stadium: Estádio de Alvalade; Attendance: 30,000; Referee: Clemente Henriques

23 April 1961 23	Benfica	7–1	Braga	Lisbon
16:00	José Águas 9', 28'; José Torres 13'; José Augusto 36' (pen.), 38', 75'; Narciso Cruz 48' (o.g.)		25' Rafael	Stadium: Estádio da Luz; Attendance: 30,000; Referee: Inácio Tereso

30 April 1961 24	Porto	3–2	Benfica	Porto
16:00	Noé Castro 32', 50'; Hernâni Silva 75' (pen.)		12', 22' António Mendes	Stadium: Estádio das Antas; Attendance: 40,000; Referee: Marcos Lobato

14 May 1961 25	Benfica	8–0	Sporting da Covilhã	Lisbon
15:00	José Águas 14', 27'; Santana 20', 43'; José Augusto 39', 45', 78'; Coluna 60'			Stadium: Estádio da Luz; Attendance: 50,000; Referee: Manuel Fragata

8 June 1961 26	Belenenses	0–4	Benfica	Lisbon
16:00			4' Santana; 30' Eusébio; 39' José Augusto; 79' Cavém	Stadium: Estádio do Restelo; Attendance: 25,000; Referee: Pena da Silva

=== Taça de Portugal ===
==== First round ====
29 January 1961 First leg	Salgueiros	2–3	Benfica	Porto
	Mário Campos 54'; José Benje 60'		35' Coluna; 39' José Torres; 85' Germano	Stadium: Estádio Engenheiro Vidal Pinheiro; Referee: Renato Santos

26 February 1961 Second leg	Benfica	7–1	Salgueiros	Lisbon
	José Torres 8', 17', 29', 40', 74'; Cavém 43'; Sampaio 72' (o.g.)		61' José Caraballo	Stadium: Estádio da Luz; Referee: José da Rosa Nunes

==== Second round ====
26 March 1961 First leg	Benfica	8–1	Olhanense	Lisbon
	José Águas 26', 52', 53', 62', 74'; Cruz 81'; Santana 83'; Coluna 90'		11' Cava	Stadium: Estádio da Luz; Referee: Marcos Lobato

16 April 1961 Second leg	Olhanense	0–4	Benfica	Olhão
			2', 8', 42' José Torres; 38' Cavém	Stadium: Estádio Padinha; Referee: Manuel Fortunato

==== Third round ====
7 May 1961 First leg	Benfica	3–1	Vitória de Setúbal	Lisbon
	Mendes 23'; Peres 26'; Jorge 69'		67' Cafum	Stadium: Estádio da Luz; Referee: Isidro Fragoso

1 June 1961 Second leg	Vitória de Setúbal	4–1	Benfica	Setúbal
	Quim 6', 12'; Pompeu 59', 81'		64' Eusébio	Stadium: Campo dos Arcos; Referee: Manuel Fortunato

=== European Cup ===
==== Preliminary round ====
29 September 1960 First leg	Hearts (Scotland)	1–2	(Portugal) Benfica	Edinburgh
19:30	Young 80'	Report	36' Águas; 74' José Augusto	Stadium: Tynecastle Park; Attendance: 29,500; Referee: Marcel Lequesne (France)

5 October 1960 Second leg	Benfica (Portugal)	3–0 (5–1 agg.)	(Scotland) Hearts	Lisbon
21:45	Águas 7', 60'; José Augusto 49'	Report		Stadium: Estádio da Luz; Attendance: 30,122; Referee: Joseph Barberan (France)

==== First round ====
6 November 1960 First leg	Benfica (Portugal)	6–2	(Hungary) Újpesti Dózsa	Lisbon
15:00	Cavém 1'; Águas 6', 28'; José Augusto 12', 87'; Santana 16'	Report	69' Göröcs; 77' Szusza	Stadium: Estádio da Luz; Attendance: 55,000; Referee: Victor Schicker (Switzerland)

30 November 1960 Second leg	Újpesti Dózsa (Hungary)	2–1 (4–7 agg.)	(Portugal) Benfica	Budapest
19:45	Halapi 55'; Szusza 61'	Report	5' Santana	Stadium: Népstadion; Attendance: 20,000; Referee: Albert Guinnard (Switzerland)

==== Quarter-final ====
8 March 1961 First leg	Benfica (Portugal)	3–1	(Denmark) AGF	Lisbon
21:30	Águas 20', 58'; José Augusto 50' (pen.)	Report	52' Amdisen	Stadium: Estádio da Luz; Attendance: 65,000; Referee: Maurice Guigue (France)

30 March 1961 Second leg	AGF (Denmark)	1–4 (2–7 agg.)	(Portugal) Benfica	Århus
13:30	Jensen 75'	Report	1', 43' José Augusto; 23' Águas; 76' Santana	Stadium: Århus Stadion; Attendance: 22,000; Referee: Marcel Bois (France)

==== Semi-final ====
26 April 1961 First leg	Benfica (Portugal)	3–0	(Austria) Rapid Wien	Lisbon
21:45	Coluna 19'; Águas 24'; Cavém 61'	Report		Stadium: Estádio da Luz; Attendance: 65,000; Referee: Kevin Howley (England)

4 May 1961 Second leg	Rapid Wien (Austria)	1–1 (1–4 agg.)	(Portugal) Benfica	Vienna
19:30	Skocik 70'	Report	66' Águas	Stadium: Praterstadion; Attendance: 63,000; Referee: Reginald Leafe (England)

===== Final =====
31 May 1961	Barcelona (Spain)	2–3	(Portugal) Benfica	Bern
19:00 CEST	21' Kocsis; 75' Czibor	Report	Águas 31'; Ramallets 32' (o.g.); Coluna 55'	Stadium: Wankdorf Stadium; Attendance: 26,732; Referee: Gottfried Dienst (Switzerland)

=== Friendlies ===
27 August 1960	Barreirense	3–2	Benfica	Barreiro
	Silvino; Madeira; Hermengildo		Germano de Figueiredo; José Torres	Stadium: Campo D. Manuel de Melo; Referee: Marcos Lobato

28 August 1960	Benfica	3–0	Oriental de Lisboa	Lisbon
				Stadium: Estádio da Luz; Referee: Joaquim Branco

1 September 1960	Benfica	2–0	Real Betis	Lisbon
	José Torres; Cavém			Stadium: Estádio da Luz; Attendance: 20,000; Referee: Joaquim Campos

3 September 1960 Taça de Honra	Beleneneses	5–0	Benfica	Lisbon
	Matateu 17', 19', 49'; Yaúca 51', 83'			Stadium: Estádio Nacional; Referee: Fernando Martins

11 September 1960 Taça de Honra	Benfica	4–3 (a.e.t.)	Sporting CP	Lisbon
	José Augusto 24', 57'; Santana 107'; Cavém 111'		12' Seminário; 52' Faustino; 92' Figueiredo	Stadium: Estádio Nacional; Referee: Fernando Martins

9 October 1960	Benfica	0–0	Sporting	Oeiras
				Stadium: Estádio Nacional

13 June 1961 Paris TM	Benfica	3–2	Anderlecht	Paris
	Eusébio 28'; José Augusto 75'; José Águas 88'		18', 37' Stockman	Stadium: Parc des Princes; Referee: M. Devillers

15 June 1961 Paris TM	Santos FC	6–3	Benfica	Paris
	Coutinho 6', 29'; Pelé 24', 43'; Pepe 35', 48'		18', 23', 35' Eusébio	Stadium: Parc des Princes

== Player statistics ==
The squad for the season consisted of the players listed in the tables below, as well as staff member Béla Guttman (manager), Fernando Cabrita (assistant manager). (Note: There were no fixed numbers assigned, and the positions used by the players may not have a modern equivalence, the tactic was closely matched for a 3–4–3)

Note 1: Note: Flags indicate national team as defined under FIFA eligibility rules. Players may hold more than one non-FIFA nationality.

Note 2: Players with squad numbers marked ‡ joined the club during the 1960-61 season via transfer, with more details in the following section.

No.	Pos	Nat	Player	Total		Primeira Divisão		Taça de Portugal		European Cup	
No.	Pos	Nat	Player	Apps	Goals	Apps	Goals	Apps	Goals	Apps	Goals
1	GK	(Portugal) POR	Costa Pereira	36	0	24	0	3	0	9	0
1	GK	(Portugal) POR	José de Bastos	1	0	0	0	1	0	0	0
1	GK	(Portugal) POR	José Barroca	3	0	2	0	1	0	0	0
1	GK	(Portugal) POR	Armando Ramalho	1	0	0	0	1	0	0	0
2	DF	(Portugal) POR	Fernando Cruz	38	1	26	0	3	1	9	0
2	DF	(Portugal) POR	Manuel Serra	17	0	11	0	3	0	3	0
3	DF	(Portugal) POR	Mário João	7	0	3	0	2	0	2	0
3	DF	(Portugal) POR	Ângelo Martins	33	0	23	0	2	0	8	0
4^{‡}	DF	(Portugal) POR	Germano de Figueiredo	34	3	23	2	3	1	8	0
4	DF	(Portugal) POR	Artur Santos	13	0	8	0	4	0	1	0
4	DF	(Portugal) POR	Sidónio Manhiça	3	0	1	0	2	0	0	0
4	DF	(Portugal) POR	Maximiano Salvador	1	0	0	0	1	0	0	0
4	DF	(Portugal) POR	Amândio Gonçalves	1	0	0	0	1	0	0	0
5	DF	(Portugal) POR	José Neto	32	0	22	0	1	0	9	0
5	DF	(Portugal) POR	Manuel Pinto	6	0	2	0	4	0	0	0
5	DF	(Portugal) POR	Humberto Fernandes	2	0	0	0	2	0	0	0
6	MF	(Portugal) POR	Mário Coluna	35	8	24	4	2	2	9	2
7	FW	(Portugal) POR	José Augusto	35	31	25	24	1	0	9	7
7	MF	(Portugal) POR	António Saraiva	22	0	14	0	3	0	5	0
7	MF	(Portugal) POR	Francisco Palmeiro	1	0	0	0	1	0	0	0
7	MF	(Portugal) POR	Peres	2	0	1	0	1	0	0	0
8	MF	(Portugal) POR	Álvaro Inácio	3	0	1	0	2	0	0	0
8	MF	(Portugal) POR	Domiciano Cavém	37	17	24	13	4	2	9	2
9	FW	(Portugal) POR	José Águas	33	43	23	27	1	5	9	11
9	FW	(Portugal) POR	José Torres	5	11	2	2	3	9	0	0
10	FW	(Portugal) POR	Santana	31	19	21	15	1	1	9	3
10^{‡}	FW	(Portugal) POR	Eusébio	2	2	1	1	1	1	0	0
11	FW	(Portugal) POR	António Mendes	5	4	3	3	2	1	0	0
11^{‡}	FW	(Portugal) POR	Jorge Lopes	5	1	1	0	4	1	0	0
11	FW	(Portugal) POR	António Moreira	5	0	1	0	4	0	0	0
11	FW	(Portugal) POR	Nartanga	1	0	0	0	1	0	0	0
11	FW	(Portugal) POR	Alfredo Espírito Santo	1	0	0	0	1	0	0	0

== Transfers ==
=== In ===
Entry date	Position	Player	From club	Fee	Ref
30 May May 1960	DF	Germano de Figueiredo	Atlético CP	Undisclosed	
July 1960	FW	Jorge Lopes	Seixal	Undisclosed	
12 May 1961	FW	Eusébio	Sporting de Lourenço Marques	Undisclosed	

=== Out ===
Exit date	Position	Player	To club	Fee	Ref
July 1960	MF	Zézinho	Montijo	Undisclosed	
July 1960	MF	Alfredo Abrantes	Belenenses	Undisclosed	
July 1960	MF	Fernando Caiado	None	Retired	
July 1960	MF	Vieira Dias	Atlético CP	Undisclosed	
