= 1964–65 S.L. Benfica season =

Benfica
1964–65 season
- President: Adolfo Vieira de Brito (until 8 May 1965); António Catarino Duarte
- Head coach: Elek Schwartz
- Stadium: Estádio da Luz
- Primeira Divisão: Winners
- Taça de Portugal: Runners-up
- European Cup: Runners-up
- Small Club World Cup: Winners
- Top goalscorer: League: Eusébio (28); All: Eusébio (48)
- Biggest win: Benfica 9–0 Braga (27 June 1965)
- Biggest defeat: CUF 2–0 Benfica (14 February 1965); Setubal 3–1 Benfica (4 July 195)
| Home colours | Away colours |

The 1964–65 season was Sport Lisboa e Benfica's 61st season in existence and the club's 31st consecutive season in the top flight of Portuguese football, covering the period from 1 August 1964 to 31 July 1965. Domestically, Benfica competed in the Primeira Divisão and Taça de Portugal, while internationally participated in the European Cup.

In Elek Schwartz's first season as manager, the squad underwent several changes: Zé Rita departed, while Alfredo Nascimento, José Melo, Malta da Silva, José Perides, Félix Guerreiro, and Arcanjo joined the club. In the league, Benfica remained in first place for the majority of the season, securing key wins against rivals such as Sporting and Porto, and ultimately clinching the league title with a comfortable margin. The club also competed in the Taça de Portugal, reaching the final and losing 3–1 to Vitória de Setúbal.

In the European Cup, Benfica achieved a notable 5–1 victory over Real Madrid in a rematch of the 1962 final, before reaching its fourth European Cup final, which was held at San Siro against Inter Milan, and ended in a 1–0 defeat amid difficult, waterlogged pitch conditions.

== Season summary ==
Like in the previous season, despite winning the league, the Taça de Portugal, and the Taça de Ouro, Benfica's early elimination in the first round of the European Cup led the board of directors to part ways with Lajos Czeizler and appoint Elek Schwartz as the new manager. To strengthen the squad, the summer transfer window saw the arrivals of Alfredo Nascimento, José Melo, Malta da Silva, José Perides, Félix Guerreiro, and Arcanjo.

Pre-season began on 22 August with a 2–1 home loss to Athletic Bilbao. Benfica then participated in the Ramón de Carranza Trophy, defeating Real Madrid—winners of the 1963–64 La Liga and runners-up in the 1963–64 European Cup—2–1 in the semi-finals, before losing 2–1 after extra time to Real Betis in the final. Later, a 3–0 victory over Sporting sent Benfica to the final of the Taça de Honra, where they defeated Belenenses 7–1.

The official season began on 13 September with a 12–2 aggregate win over Atlético in the first round of the Taça de Portugal. In the European Cup, Benfica faced FC Aris Bonnevoie in the preliminary round, winning 5–1 away and repeating the same scoreline at home. In the next round of the Taça de Portugal, Benfica defeated Porto 4–1 at home and drew 1–1 away, advancing to the following round.

October opened with a 5–0 league win over Lusitano de Évora, followed by a 3–0 home victory against Sporting, with two goals from José Torres and one from Eusébio. Two consecutive draws with Leixões and CUF left the club with six points, two behind leaders Vitória de Setúbal. November began with a draw against Académica, followed by wins over Braga and Belenenses. In Europe, Benfica faced Chaux-de-Fonds, drawing 1–1 away and winning 5–0 at home.

The following month, Benfica won all four league games, including a 4–0 home win over Porto, followed by two more victories in January, finishing the first half of the season four points ahead of second-place Académica. To close the month, the team recorded two draws: 2–2 away against Lusitano de Évora and Sporting.

In February, Benfica recorded three league wins and one loss, reducing their lead to five points. The highlight of the season came in the European Cup quarter-finals, in a rematch of the 1962 European Cup final against five-time winners Real Madrid. Benfica won 5–1, with José Augusto opening the scoring, Eusébio adding two goals, and Simões and Coluna scoring one each. March began with two more league victories, but was followed by two defeats: a 1–0 away loss to Porto and a 2–1 loss to Real Madrid. The month ended with a 5–0 league win over Varzim, leaving Benfica with a four-point lead and a place in the European Cup semi-finals with three league games remaining.

In the following month, a 2–1 away victory over Vitória de Setúbal practically secured the league title for Benfica, with two matches remaining, both of which the team also won. In the European Cup, they faced Győri ETO FC, winning both matches with a 5–0 aggregate and setting up a final against Inter Milan.

On 27 May 1965, Benfica played Inter Milan in the European Cup final at Inter's home ground, San Siro. The club had previously contested UEFA's decision to stage the final in Milan, arguing it gave Inter a home advantage, and even suggested that, in the event of a draw, a replay should be held in Lisbon. The match itself was preceded by further controversy over the state of the pitch, which had been heavily affected by rain; many considered the field unfit for play, but the game went ahead. Inter won 1–0 following a mistake by goalkeeper Costa Pereira. Some sources note that, from the moment UEFA awarded the final to San Siro, Inter benefited from a significant home advantage, which helped them adapt better to the muddy, waterlogged conditions than Benfica could.

Benfica resumed its participation in the Taça de Portugal, eliminating Olhanense in the quarter-finals and Braga in the semi-finals, before losing 3–1 in the final to Vitória de Setúbal.

After the end of the official season, Benfica concluded their international commitments by drew with Vasco da Gama at the Maracanã, and lost 2–1 to Galicia F.C in Caracas, and competing in the Small Club World Cup in Venezuela, where they defeated Atlético Madrid.

== Competitions ==
Win Draw Loss Postponed

=== Overall record ===
| Competition | First match | Last match | Record | | | | | | | | |
| Competition | First match | Last match | G | W | D | L | GF | GA | GD | Win % | Source |
|---|---|---|---|---|---|---|---|---|---|---|---|
| Primeira Divisão | 10 October 1964 | 9 May 1965 | 26 | 19 | 5 | 2 | 88 | 21 | +67 | 73.08 | |
| Taça de Portugal | 13 September 1964 | 4 July 1965 | 11 | 8 | 1 | 2 | 42 | 13 | +29 | 72.73 | |
| European Cup | 16 September 1964 | 27 May 1965 | 9 | 6 | 1 | 2 | 27 | 7 | +20 | 66.67 | |
| Total | | | 46 | 33 | 7 | 6 | 157 | 41 | +116 | 71.74 | |

=== Primeira Divisão ===
==== League table ====
| Pos | Team | Pld | W | D | L | GF | GA | GD | Pts | Qualification or relegation |
|---|---|---|---|---|---|---|---|---|---|---|
| 1 | Benfica (C) | 26 | 19 | 5 | 2 | 88 | 21 | +67 | 43 | Qualification to European Cup preliminary round |
| 2 | Porto | 26 | 17 | 3 | 6 | 47 | 27 | +20 | 37 | Qualification to Inter-Cities Fairs Cup first round |
| 3 | CUF Barreiro | 26 | 15 | 5 | 6 | 49 | 29 | +20 | 35 | Qualification to Inter-Cities Fairs Cup first round |
| 4 | Académica | 26 | 16 | 2 | 8 | 58 | 40 | +18 | 34 | |
| 5 | Sporting CP | 26 | 12 | 8 | 6 | 39 | 35 | +4 | 32 | Qualification to Inter-Cities Fairs Cup first round |

Source: RSSSF
(C) Champions

==== Matches ====
| 10 October 1964 1 | Benfica | 5–0 | Lusitano de Évora | Lisbon |
| | Coluna 33'; Torres 46', 78'; Augusto 67'; Neto 69' | | | Stadium: Estádio da Luz; Referee: Virgílio Baptista |

| 18 October 1964 2 | Benfica | 3-0 | Sporting | Lisbon |
| | Eusébio 2'; Torres 5', 85' | | | Stadium: Estádio da Luz; Attendance: 45000; Referee: Francisco Guerra |

| 25 October 1964 3 | Leixões | 1–1 | Benfica | Matosinhos |
| | Oliveirinha 10' | | Torres 77' | Stadium: Estádio do Mar; Referee: Braga Barros |

| 31 October 1964 4 | Benfica | 1–1 | CUF | Lisbon |
| | Coluna 64' | | Fernando Oliveira 86' | Stadium: Estádio da Luz; Referee: Manuel Fortunato |

| 8 November 1964 5 | Académica | 2–2 | Benfica | Coimbra |
| | Manuel António 23' 60 (p.b.) Fernando Cruz | | Eusébio 5', 35' | Stadium: Estádio Municipal de Coimbra; Attendance: 15,000; Referee: Virgílio Baptista |

| 22 November 1964 6 | Benfica | 7–0 | Braga | Lisbon |
| | Eusébio 11', 14', 25', 51'; Torres 17', 74'; Augusto 32' | | | Stadium: Estádio da Luz; Referee: Encarnação Salgado |

| 29 November 1964 7 | Belenenses | 0–6 | Benfica | Belém |
| | | | Pedras 1', 47'; Torres 6'; Eusébio 18', 66'; Augusto 56' | Stadium: Estádio do Restelo; Referee: Hermínio Soares |

| 6 December 1964 8 | Benfica | 6–0 | Torreense | Lisbon |
| | Torres 22', 32', 87'; Eusébio 36', 60'; Coluna 57' | | | Stadium: Estádio da Luz; Referee: Carlos Dinis |

| 13 December 1964 9 | Benfica | 4–0 | Porto | Lisbon |
| | Augusto 12', 40'; Eusébio 27', 51' | | | Stadium: Estádio da Luz; Referee: Virgílio Baptista |

| 20 December 1964 10 | Varzim | 1–4 | Benfica | Varzim |
| | Rogério Dias 20' | | Augusto 8'; Eusébio 16', 50'; Torres 25' | Stadium: Estádio do Varzim Sport Club; Referee: Porfírio Silva |

| 27 December 1964 11 | Benfica | 3–2 | Vitória de Setúbal | Lisbon |
| | Eusébio 3', 20'; José Torres 80' | | Augusto 11'; Jaime Graça 43' | Stadium: Estádio da Luz |

| 3 January 1965 12 | Seixal F.C. | 0–4 | Benfica | Seixal |
| | | | Augusto 1'; Eusébio 55' (penalty) 68'; Torres 80' |

| 10 January 1965 13 | Benfica | 4–0 | Vitória de Guimarães | Lisbon |
| | Eusébio 14', 82', 89'; Iaúca 31' | | | Stadium: Estádio da Luz |

| 17 January 1965 14 | Lusitano de Évora | 0–0 | Benfica | Évora |

| 31 January 1965 15 | Sporting | 2–2 | Benfica | Alvalade |
| | Carlitos 1'; Lourenço 74' | | Eusébio 36' (penalty); Augusto 57' | Stadium: Estádio José Alvalade; Referee: João Pinto Ferreira |

| 7 February 1965 16 | Benfica | 5–0 | Leixões | Lisbon |
| | Torres 8', 50', 83'; Eusébio 59', 62' (penalty) | | | Stadium: Estádio da Luz |

| 14 February 1965 17 | CUF | 2–0 | Benfica | Barreiro |
| | Espírito Santo 48'; José Ferreira Pinto 61' | | | Stadium: Campo de Santa Bárbara; Referee: Reinaldo Silva |

| 20 February 1965 18 | Benfica | 3–0 | Académica | Lisbon |
| | Torres 15', 22'; Eusébio 17' | | | Stadium: Estádio da Luz |

| 28 February 1965 19 | Braga | 1–2 | Benfica | Braga |
| | Teixeira 53' | | Coluna 31'; Eusébio 35' (penalty) | Stadium: Estádio 28 de Maio |

| 7 March 1965 20 | Benfica | 3–2 | Belenenses | Lisbon |
| | Coluna 16' (penalty); Augusto 52'; Torres 68' | | Rodrigues 72'; Adelino 76' | Stadium: Estádio da Luz |

| 14 March 1965 21 | Torreense | 1–3 | Benfica | Torres Vedras |
| | Manuel Serafim 89' (o.g.) | | Coluna 10'; Manuel Serafim 35'; Félix Guerreiro 44' |

| 21 March 1964 22 | Porto | 1–0 | Benfica | Lisbon |
| | Naftal 21' | | | Stadium: Estádio da Luz |

| 28 March 1965 23 | Benfica | 5–0 | Varzim | Lisbon |
| | Coluna 17', 70'; Torres 25', 50', 68' | | | Stadium: Estádio da Luz |

| 4 April 1965 24 | Vitória de Setúbal | 1–2 | Benfica | Setúbal |
| | Carlos Manuel 32' | | Eusébio 30'; José Augusto 87' |

| 2 May 1965 25 | Benfica | 11–3 | Seixal F.C. | Lisbon |
| | Arcanjo 3'; Santana 4', 48', 52', 56', 89'; Félix Guerreiro 32'; Iaúca 41'; Serafim 60', 62', 86' | | Carvalho 24'; Cambalacho 37', 84' | Stadium: Estádio da Luz |

| 9 May 1965 26 | Vitória de Guimarães | 1–2 | Benfica | Guimarães |
| | Peres 52' (penalty) | | Iaúca 62', 76' | Stadium: Estádio D. Afonso Henriques; Referee: João Gomes |

=== Taça de Portugal ===
==== First round ====
| 13 September 1965; First leg | Atlético | 0–3 | Benfica | Alcântara |
| | | | Serafim 20'; Félix Guerreiro 49', 89' | Stadium: Estádio da Tapadinha; Referee: Fernando Martins |

| 20 September 1965; Second leg | Benfica | 9–2 (12–2 agg.) | Atlético | Lisbon |
| | Coluna 3'; Félix Guerreiro 6', 25', 33', 86'; Augusto Silva 23', 34'; Arcanjo 41'; Raúl Machado 43' | | | Stadium: Estádio da Luz; Referee: Vaz Valente |

==== Second round ====
| 27 September 1964; First leg | Benfica | 4–1 | Porto | Lisbon |
| | Augusto 13'; Eusébio 15' (penalty) 64'; Torres 82' | | Valdir 40' | Stadium: Estádio da Luz; Referee: Marcos Lobato |

| 4 October 1964; Second leg | Porto | 1–1 (1–5 agg.) | Benfica | Porto |
| | Carlos Baptista 25' | | Eusébio 6' | Stadium: Estádio das Antas; Referee: Porfírio Silva |

==== Third Round ====
| 16 May 1965; First leg | CUF | 2–1 | Benfica | Barreiro |
| | Uria 83' | | Eusébio 84' | Stadium: Campo de Santa Bárbara; Referee: António Amado |

| 22 May 1965; Second leg | Benfica | 3–0 (4–2 agg.) | CUF | Lisbon |
| | Eusébio 25', 80'; Simões 32' | | | Stadium: Estádio da Luz; Referee: Francisco Guerra |

==== Quarter-finals ====
| 30 May 1965; First leg | Benfica | 4–1 | Olhanense | Lisbon |
| | Augusto 44', 89'; José Torres 56'; António Simões 66' | | | Stadium: Estádio da Luz; Referee: Encarnação Salgado |

| 6 June 1965; Second leg | Olhanense | 2–3 (3–7 agg.) | Benfica | Olhão |
| | Reina 15' | | Santana 5'; Torres 44'; Pedras 72' | Stadium: Estádio Padinha |

==== Semi-finals ====
| 20 June 1965; First leg | Braga | 1–4 | Benfica | Braga |
| | Teixeira 43' | | Coluna 21'; Eusébio 31', 59', 67' | Stadium: Estádio 28 de Maio; Referee: Francisco Guerra |

| 27 June 1965; Second leg | Benfica | 9–0 (13–1 agg.) | Braga | Lisbon |
| | Morais Rodrigues 3' (o.g.); Pedras 17', 23'; Eusébio 30', 32'; Iaúca 52', 59', 89'; Simões 85' | | | Stadium: Estádio da Luz; Referee: Marcos Lobato |

==== Final ====
| 4 July 1965; Final | Benfica | 1–3 | Vitória se Setubal | Oeiras |
| | Cavém 82' | | José Maria 8'; Jaime Graça 57'; Armando Bonjour 83' | Stadium: Jamor; Referee: Francisco Guerra |

=== European Cup ===
==== Preliminary round ====
| 16 September 1964; First leg | (Luxembourg) FC Aris Bonnevoie | 1–5 | (Portugal) Sport Lisboa e Benfica | Luxembourg City |
| | Hoffmann 87' | Report | Torres 15', 18', 35', 60'; Eusébio 42' | Stadium: Stade Municipal; Attendance: 4,962; Referee: Karl Keller (Switzerland) |

| 30 October 1964; Second leg | Benfica (Portugal) | 5–1 (10–2 agg.) | (Luxembourg) FC Aris Bonnevoie | Lisbon |
| | Eusébio 23', 52'; Simões 57'; Torres 69'; Augusto 87' | Report | Schreiner 48' | Stadium: Estádio da Luz; Attendance: 16,289; Referee: Jean Tricot (France) |

==== First Round ====
| 4 November 1964; First leg | La Chaux-de-Fonds (Switzerland) | 1–1 | (Portugal) Benfica | La Chaux-de-Fonds |
| | Antenen 37' | Report | Torres 6' | Stadium: Stade de la Charrière; Attendance: 6,482; Referee: Raoul Righi (ITA) |

| 9 December 1964; Second leg | Benfica (Portugal) | 5–0 (6–1 agg.) | La Chaux-de-Fonds (Switzerland) | Lisbon |
| | Coluna 35'; Torres 40', 66', 85'; Eusébio 53' | Report | | Stadium: Estádio da Luz; Attendance: 54,471; Referee: Michel Kitabdjian (France) |

==== Quarter-Finals ====
| 24 February 1965; First leg | Benfica (Portugal) | 5–1 | (Spain) Real Madrid | Estádio da Luz, Lisbon |
| 22:45 CET | Augusto 9'; Eusébio 12', 25'; Simões 75'; Coluna 87' | Report | Amancio 58' | Attendance: 64,256; Referee: Kevin Howley (England) |

| 17 March 1965; Second leg | Real Madrid (Spain) | 2–1 | (Portugal) Benfica | Santiago Bernabéu, Madrid |
| 20:30 CET | Grosso 10'; Gento 70' | Report | Eusébio 40' | Attendance: 73,012; Referee: Hugh Phillips (Scotland) |

==== Semi-Finals ====
| 30 April 1965; First leg | Győri Vasas ETO (Hungary) | 0–1 | (Portugal) Benfica | Népstadion, Budapest |
| | | Report | Augusto 70' | Attendance: 62,327; Referee: Valdemar Hansen (Denmark) |

| 6 May 1965; Second leg | Benfica (Portugal) | 4–0 | (Hungary) Győri Vasas ETO | Estádio da Luz, Lisbon |
| | Eusébio 22', 41'; Torres 34', 40' | Report | | Attendance: 43,875; Referee: Michel Kitabdjian (France) |

==== Final ====
| 27 May 1965 | Inter Milan (Italy) | 1–0 | (Portugal) Benfica | San Siro, Milan |
| 21:30 CET | Jair 43' | Report | | Attendance: 77,000; Referee: Gottfried Dienst (Switzerland) |

=== Non-official matches ===
==== Ramón de Carranza Trophy ====
| 29 August 1964; Semi-Finals | Benfica | 2–1 | Real Madrid | Cádiz |
| | [Eusebio]] 17'; Torres 93' | Report | Puskás 62' | Stadium: Estadio Ramón de Carranza; Referee: José Ortiz de Mendíbil |

| 30 August 1964; Final | Betis | 2–0 | Benfica | Cádiz |
| | Rogelio 91' (Frasco 104) | Report | | Stadium: Estadio Ramon de Carranza |

==== Small Club World Cup ====
| 12 July 1965; Small Club World Cup | Benfica | 0–3 | Atlético Madrid | Caracas |
| | | Report | | Stadium: Estádio Olímpico de la Universidad Central de Venezuela |

| 17 July 1965; Small Club World Cup | Atlético Madrid | 0–3 | Benfica | Caracas |
| | | Report | José Augusto; Iaúca; Jorge Calado | Stadium: Estádio Olímpico de la Universidad Central de Venezuela |

==== Friendlies ====
| 1 July 1964 | Barreirense | 2–1 | Benfica | Barreiro |
| | | | | Stadium: Campo Dom Manuel de Melo |

| 22 August 1964 | Benfica | 1–2 | Athletic Bilbao | Lisbon |
| | Eusébio | | | Stadium: Estádio da Luz |

| 5 September 1964; Taça de Honra; Semi-Finals | Benfica | 3–0 | Sporting | Belém |
| | Augusto 20'; Torres 21', 27' | | | Stadium: Estádio do Restelo |

| 9 September 1964; Taça de Honra; Final | Belenenses | 1–7 | Benfica | Belém |
| | Fernando Peres 29' (penalty) | | Eusébio 19', 22', 78', 80'; Torres 25', 65'; Simões 82' | Stadium: Estádio do Restelo |

| 7 October 1964; Charities Challenge Cup | Chelsea | 2–4 | Benfica | London |
| | | | Torres; Augusto | Stadium: Stamford Bridge |

| 9 May 1965 | AFC Ajax | 2–1 | Benfica | Amsterdam |
| | | | Augusto | Stadium: Olympisch Stadion Amsterdam |

| 30 June 1965 | CUF | 1–1 | Benfica | Barreiro |
| | | | Eusébio | Stadium: Estádio Alfredo da Silva |

| 8 July 1965 | Vasco da Gama | 1–1 | Benfica | Maracanã |
| | | | Eusébio | Stadium: Rio de Janeiro |

| 15 September 1965 | Galicia F.C. | 2–1 | Benfica | Caracas |
| | | | Eusébio | Stadium: Estádio Olímpico de la Universidad Central de Venezuela |

== Player statistics ==
The squad for the season consisted of the players listed in the tables below, as well as staff member Fernando Riera (manager), Fernando Cabrita (assistant manager).

Note 1: Note: Flags indicate national team as defined under FIFA eligibility rules. Players may hold more than one non-FIFA nationality.

Note 2: Players with squad numbers marked ‡ joined the club during the 1964–65 season via transfer, with more details in the following section.

| No. | Pos | Nat | Player | Total | | Primeira Divisão | | Taça de Portugal | | European Cup | |
| No. | Pos | Nat | Player | Apps | Goals | Apps | Goals | Apps | Goals | Apps | Goals |
|---|---|---|---|---|---|---|---|---|---|---|---|
| 1 | GK | (Portugal) POR | Costa Pereira | 38 | 0 | 23 | 0 | 6 | 0 | 9 | 0 |
| 1 | GK | (Portugal) POR | José Melo | 2 | 0 | 1 | 0 | 1 | 0 | 0 | 0 |
| 1 | GK | (Portugal) POR | Alfredo Nascimento | 6 | 0 | 1 | 0 | 5 | 0 | 0 | 0 |
| 1 | GK | (Angola) ANG | Pedro Benge | 2 | 0 | 2 | 0 | 0 | 0 | 0 | 0 |
| | DF | (Portugal) POR | Augusto Silva | 10 | 2 | 6 | 0 | 4 | 2 | 0 | 0 |
| | DF | (Portugal) POR | Luciano | 8 | 0 | 8 | 0 | 0 | 0 | 0 | 0 |
| | DF | (Portugal) POR | Ângelo Martins | 3 | 0 | 3 | 0 | 0 | 0 | 0 | 0 |
| | DF | (Portugal) POR | Malta da Silva | 6 | 0 | 6 | 0 | 0 | 0 | 0 | 0 |
| | DF | (Portugal) POR | Jacinto | 16 | 0 | 10 | 0 | 3 | 0 | 3 | 0 |
| | DF | (Portugal) POR | Domingos Fernandes | 2 | 0 | 2 | 0 | 0 | 0 | 0 | 0 |
| 2 | DF | (Portugal) POR | Domiciano Cavém | 37 | 1 | 19 | 0 | 10 | 1 | 8 | 0 |
| 3 | DF | (Portugal) POR | Germano | 32 | 0 | 15 | 0 | 8 | 0 | 9 | 0 |
| 4 | DF | (Portugal) POR | Raul Machado | 32 | 0 | 15 | 0 | 8 | 0 | 9 | 0 |
| 5 | DF | (Portugal) POR | Fernando Cruz | 36 | 0 | 20 | 0 | 8 | 0 | 8 | 0 |
| | MF | (Portugal) POR | Jorge Calado | 13 | 0 | 3 | 0 | 8 | 0 | 2 | 0 |
| | MF | (Portugal) POR | Hummberto Fernandes | 3 | 0 | 2 | 0 | 1 | 0 | 0 | 0 |
| | MF | (Portugal) POR | Pedras | 13 | 5 | 7 | 2 | 6 | 3 | 0 | 0 |
| | MF | (Portugal) POR | José Pérides | 21 | 0 | 16 | 0 | 1 | 0 | 4 | 0 |
| | MF | (Portugal) POR | Joaquim Arcanjo | 2 | 2 | 1 | 1 | 1 | 1 | 0 | 0 |
| | MF | (Portugal) POR | Félix Guerreiro | 5 | 8 | 3 | 2 | 2 | 6 | 0 | 0 |
| 6 | MF | (Portugal) POR | José Neto | 14 | 1 | 8 | 1 | 3 | 0 | 3 | 0 |
| 7 | MF | (Portugal) POR | Mário Coluna | 42 | 12 | 23 | 8 | 10 | 2 | 9 | 2 |
| 8 | FW | (Portugal) POR | José Augusto | 39 | 18 | 23 | 10 | 7 | 3 | 9 | 5 |
| 8 | FW | (Portugal) POR | Santana | 2 | 6 | 1 | 5 | 1 | 1 | 0 | 0 |
| 9 | FW | (Portugal) POR | José Torres | 39 | 35 | 23 | 23 | 7 | 3 | 9 | 9 |
| 9 | FW | (Portugal) POR | Iaúca | 5 | 7 | 3 | 4 | 2 | 3 | 0 | 0 |
| 10 | FW | (Portugal) POR | Eusébio | 36 | 48 | 20 | 28 | 7 | 11 | 9 | 9 |
| 11 | FW | (Portugal) POR | António Simões | 32 | 5 | 16 | 0 | 7 | 3 | 9 | 2 |
| 11 | FW | (Portugal) POR | Serafim | 10 | 5 | 6 | 4 | 4 | 1 | 0 | 0 |
