= Peres (Portuguese footballer) =

Portuguese footballer (born 1939)

Personal information
- Full name: António Francisco de Jesus Moreira
- Date of birth: 3 February 1939 (age 87)
- Height: 1.73 m (5 ft 8 in)
- Position: Midfielder

Youth career
- 1956–1958: Candal
- 1958–1961: Benfica

Senior career*
Years	Team	Apps	(Gls)
1961	Benfica	1	(0)
1961–1962	Atlético CP	25	(5)
1962–1971	Vitória Guimarães	206	(51)
Total		232	(56)
- * Club domestic league appearances and goals

António Francisco de Jesus Moreira (born 3 February 1939) is a former Portuguese professional footballer.

== Career statistics ==
=== Club ===
Club	Season	League			Cup		Other		Total	
Club	Season	Division	Apps	Goals	Apps	Goals	Apps	Goals	Apps	Goals
Benfica	1960–61	Primeira Divisão	1	0	1	1	0	0	2	1
Atlético CP	1961–62	Primeira Divisão	25	5	2	1	0	0	27	6
Vitória Guimarães	1962–63	Primeira Divisão	24	7	2	0	0	0	26	7
Vitória Guimarães	1963–64	Primeira Divisão	26	8	1	1	0	0	27	9
Vitória Guimarães	1964–65	Primeira Divisão	23	10	0	0	0	0	23	10
Vitória Guimarães	1965–66	Primeira Divisão	26	14	0	0	0	0	26	14
Vitória Guimarães	1966–67	Primeira Divisão	20	4	0	0	0	0	20	4
Vitória Guimarães	1967–68	Primeira Divisão	25	3	2	0	0	0	27	3
Vitória Guimarães	1968–69	Primeira Divisão	22	4	1	0	0	0	23	4
Vitória Guimarães	1969–70	Primeira Divisão	24	1	0	0	4 (Note: Appearances in the Fairs Cup)	0	28	1
Vitória Guimarães	1970–71	Primeira Divisão	16	0	0	0	4	1	20	1
Vitória Guimarães	Total		206	51	6	1	8	1	230	53
Career total			232	56	9	3	8	1	249	60
