= Jorge Lopes =

Portuguese footballer (born 1942)

Personal information
- Full name: Jorge Manuel Soares Lopes
- Date of birth: 5 September 1942 (age 84)
- Place of birth: Montijo, Portugal
- Height: 1.81 m (5 ft 11 in)
- Position: Forward

Youth career
- 1958–1959: Montijo
- 1959–1961: Benfica

Senior career*
Years	Team	Apps	(Gls)
1961	Benfica	1	(0)
1961–1964	Académica	11	(0)
1964–1965	Seixal	11	(2)
Total		23	(2)

International career
1960–1961	Portugal U18	7	(2)
- * Club domestic league appearances and goals

Jorge Manuel Soares Lopes (born 5 September 1942) is a former Portuguese professional footballer.

== Career statistics ==
=== Club ===
Club	Season	League			Cup		Other		Total	
Club	Season	Division	Apps	Goals	Apps	Goals	Apps	Goals	Apps	Goals
Benfica	1960–61	Primeira Divisão	1	0	4	1	0	0	5	1
Académica	1961–62	Primeira Divisão	2	0	0	0	0	0	2	0
Académica	1962–63	Primeira Divisão	7	0	5	1	0	0	12	1
Académica	1963–64	Primeira Divisão	2	0	1	0	0	0	3	0
Académica	Total		11	0	6	1	0	0	17	1
Seixal	1964–65	Primeira Divisão	11	2	0	0	0	0	11	2
Career total			23	2	10	2	0	0	33	4
