= 1965 European Cup final =

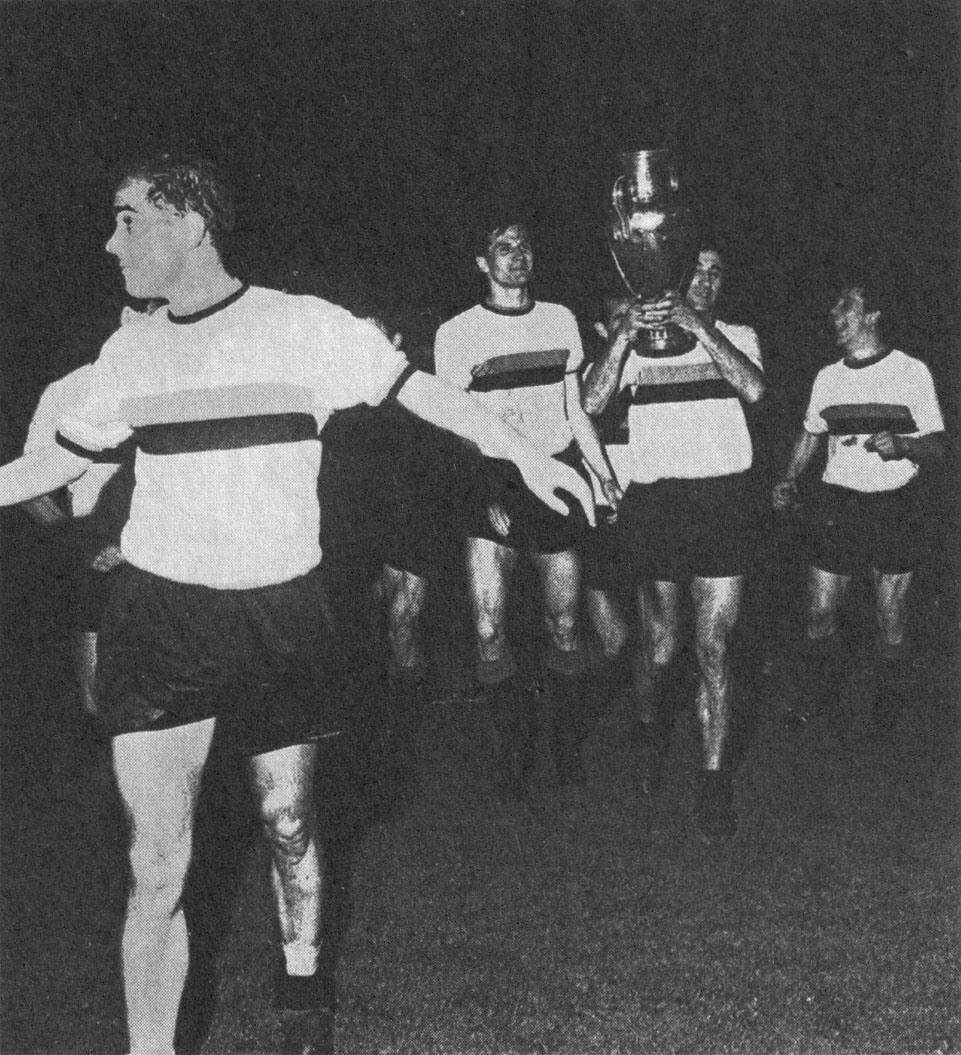
- Inter Milan's Suárez, Facchetti, Peiró and Bedin with the trophy
- Event: 1964–65 European Cup
Inter Milan	Benfica
(Italy)	(Portugal)
1	0
- Date: 27 May 1965
- Venue: San Siro, Milan
- Referee: Gottfried Dienst (Switzerland)
- Attendance: 89,000

The 1965 European Cup final was a football match played at the San Siro in Milan, Italy on 27 May 1965 as the conclusion to the 1964–65 European Cup.

The match was contested by defending champions Inter Milan of Italy and two-time former winners Benfica of Portugal.

Jair scored the only goal of the game in the 43rd minute as Inter Milan successfully defended their title and won the trophy for the second time.

This is the second and as of 2026, the last time that the team won the title in their home stadium.

== Background ==
Inter Milan were the defending champions after defeating Real Madrid 3–1 in the previous year's final in what was their only previous experience of European competition.

Benfica had won the competition twice before, defeating Barcelona 3–2 in the 1961 final and Real Madrid 5–3 in the 1962 final. They had made the final three years running but lost 2–1 to AC Milan in 1963.

== Route to the final ==
(Italy) Inter Milan				Round	(Portugal) Benfica			
Opponent	Agg.	1st leg	2nd leg		Opponent	Agg.	1st leg	2nd leg
Bye				Prelim. round	(Luxembourg) Aris Bonnevoie	10–2	5–1 (A)	5–1 (H)
(Romania) Dinamo București	7–0	6–0 (H)	1–0 (A)	First round	(Switzerland) La Chaux-de-Fonds	6–1	1–1 (A)	5–0 (H)
(Scotland) Rangers	3–2	3–1 (H)	0–1 (A)	Quarter-finals	(Spain) Real Madrid	6–3	5–1 (H)	1–2 (A)
(England) Liverpool	4–3	1–3 (A)	3–0 (H)	Semi-finals	(Hungary) Vasas ETO Győr	5–0	1–0 (A)	4–0 (H)

=== Inter Milan ===
Inter Milan qualified for the competition as defending champions and they were given a bye in the preliminary round.

In the first round, Inter Milan faced Dinamo București of Romania. Inter Milan won the first leg 6–0 at home and the second leg 1–0 away to advance 7–0 on aggregate.

Inter Milan then faced Rangers of Scotland in the quarter-finals. Inter Milan won the first leg 3–1 at home and lost the second leg 1–0 away from home to advance 3–2 on aggregate.

In the semi-finals, Inter Milan faced Liverpool of England. After losing the first leg 3–1 away from home, Inter Milan won the second leg 3–0 at home to advance to the final 4–3 on aggregate.

=== Benfica ===
Benfica qualified for the competition as winners of the 1963–64 Primeira Divisão.

In the preliminary round, Benfica defeated Aris Bonnevoie of Luxembourg 5–1 away in the first leg and by the same scoreline at home in the second leg to advance 10–2 on aggregate.

La Chaux-de-Fonds of Switzerland were Benfica's opponents in the first round. After drawing the first leg 1–1 away from home, Benfica won the second leg at home 5–0 to advance 6–1 on aggregate.

Benfica then faced Real Madrid of Spain in the quarter-finals. After winning the first leg 5–1 at home, Benfica lost the second leg 2–1 away from home to advance 6–3 on aggregate.

In the semi-finals, Benfica defeated Győri Vasas ETO of Hungary 1–0 in the first leg away from home and 4–0 in the second leg at home to advance to the final 5–0 on aggregate.

== Match ==
=== Details ===
27 May 1965
21:30 CET

Inter Milan (Italy)	1–0	(Portugal) Benfica
Jair 43'	Report

San Siro, Milan
Attendance: 89,000
Referee: Gottfried Dienst (Switzerland)

Inter Milan	Benfica

GK	1	(Italy) Giuliano Sarti
RB	2	(Italy) Tarcisio Burgnich
LB	3	(Italy) Giacinto Facchetti
DM	4	(Italy) Gianfranco Bedin
CB	5	(Italy) Aristide Guarneri
SW	6	(Italy) Armando Picchi (c)
RW	7	(Brazil) Jair
CF	8	(Italy) Sandro Mazzola
LW	9	(Spain) Joaquín Peiró
CM	10	(Spain) Luis Suárez
CM	11	(Italy) Mario Corso
Manager:
(Argentina) Helenio Herrera

GK	1	(Portugal) Costa Pereira
RB	2	(Portugal) Domiciano Cavém
CB	3	(Portugal) Germano
CB	4	(Portugal) Raul Machado
LB	5	(Portugal) Fernando Cruz
DM	6	(Portugal) José Neto
CM	7	(Portugal) Mário Coluna (c)
RF	8	(Portugal) José Augusto
CF	9	(Portugal) José Torres
CF	10	(Portugal) Eusébio
LF	11	(Portugal) António Simões
Manager:
(Romania) Elek Schwartz

== See also ==
- 1964–65 S.L. Benfica season
- 1964–65 Inter Milan season
- 1965 European Cup Winners' Cup final
- 1965 Inter-Cities Fairs Cup final
- 1965 Intercontinental Cup
- Inter Milan in international football
- S.L. Benfica in international football
