= Alfredo Espírito Santo =

Portuguese footballer

Alfredo Espirito Santo
Personal information
- Full name: Alfredo Agostinho Espirito Santo
- Date of birth: 18 April 1938 (age 88)
- Place of birth: Lobito, Benguela, Portuguese Angola
- Position: Forward

Youth career
- –1959: Benfica Luanda
- 1959–1961: Benfica

Senior career*
Years	Team	Apps	(Gls)
1961–1962	Benfica	0	(0)
1962–1963	Sporting Covilhã		
1963–1964	Olhanense	21	(3)
1964–1968	CUF	78	(7)
1971–1973	Montijo		
- * Club domestic league appearances and goals

Alfredo Agostinho Espirito Santo (born 18 April 1938) is a Portuguese former professional footballer who played as a forward.

== Career statistics ==
Club	Season	League			Cup		Other		Total	
Club	Season	Division	Apps	Goals	Apps	Goals	Apps	Goals	Apps	Goals
Benfica	1960–61	Primeira Divisão	0	0	1	0	0	0	1	0
Benfica	1961–62	Primeira Divisão	0	0	4	0	0	0	4	0
Benfica	Total		0	0	5	0	0	0	5	0
Olhanense	1963–64	Primeira Divisão	21	3	0	0	0	0	21	3
CUF	1964–65	Primeira Divisão	16	3	0	0	0	0	16	3
CUF	1965–66	Primeira Divisão	25	2	0	0	2 (Note: Appearances in the Fairs Cup)	0	27	2
CUF	1966–67	Primeira Divisão	22	2	1	1	0	0	23	3
CUF	1967–68	Primeira Divisão	15	0	0	0	1	0	16	0
CUF	Total		78	7	1	1	3	0	82	8
Montijo	1972–73	Primeira Divisão	26	0	0	0	0	0	26	0
Career total			125	10	6	1	3	0	134	11
