= Amândio =

Portuguese footballer

Personal information
- Full name: Amândio da Costa Gonçalves
- Date of birth: 24 March 1943 (age 83)
- Place of birth: Pomares, Portugal
- Height: 1.68 m (5 ft 6 in)
- Position: Defender

Youth career
- 1958–1961: Benfica

Senior career*
Years	Team	Apps	(Gls)
1961–1964	Benfica	2	(0)
1964–1965	Tirsense		
1965–1966	Naval		
1966–1973	Tirsense		

International career
1960–1961	Portugal U18	9	(0)
- * Club domestic league appearances and goals

Amândio da Costa Gonçalves (born 24 March 1943) is a former Portuguese professional footballer.

== Career statistics ==
=== Club ===
Club	Season	League			Cup		Other		Total	
Club	Season	Division	Apps	Goals	Apps	Goals	Apps	Goals	Apps	Goals
Benfica	1960–61	Primeira Divisão	0	0	1	0	0	0	1	0
Benfica	1961–62	Primeira Divisão	2	0	1	0	0	0	3	0
Benfica	1962–63	Primeira Divisão	0	0	0	0	0	0	0	0
Benfica	1963–64	Primeira Divisão	0	0	0	0	0	0	0	0
Benfica	Total		2	0	2	0	0	0	4	0
Tirsense	1967–68	Primeira Divisão	9	0	1	0	0	0	10	0
Tirsense	1970–71	Primeira Divisão	9	1	2	0	0	0	11	1
Tirsense	1971–72	Primeira Divisão	20	0	1	0	0	0	21	0
Tirsense	Total		38	1	4	0	0	0	42	1
Career total			40	1	6	0	0	0	46	1
