= 1967–68 S.L. Benfica season =

Benfica
1967–68 season
- President: Adolfo Vieira de Brito
- Head coach: Fernando Riera (until 30 November 1967); Fernando Cabrita (until 7 April 1968); Otto Glória
- Stadium: Estádio da Luz
- Primeira Divisão: 1st (champions)
- Taça de Portugal: Semi-finals
- European Cup: Runners-up
- Top goalscorer: League: Eusébio (43); All: Eusébio (51)
- Biggest win: Benfica 9–0 Montijo (15 October 1967)
- Biggest defeat: Manchester United 4–1 Benfica (29 May 1968); Porto 3–0 Benfica (9 June 1968)
Home colours	Away colours

The 1967–68 season was Sport Lisboa e Benfica's 64st season in existence and the club's 34st consecutive season in the top flight of Portuguese football, covering the period from 1 August 1967 to 31 July 1968. Domestically, Benfica competed in the Primeira Divisão and Taça de Portugal, while internationally participated in the European Cup.

Long-serving players Costa Pereira, Germano and Augusto Silva left the club, while the board decided to maintain Fernando Riera as head coach for a second season. Midway through the campaign Riera left the club, and Otto Glória returned as manager. Benfica won its 16th league title, reached the semi-finals of the Taça de Portugal, and advanced to the European Cup final, where they lost 4–1 after extra time to Manchester United at Wembley Stadium.

== Season summary ==
After reclaiming the league title, the board decided to retain Fernando Riera as coach for another season. Long-time goalkeeper Costa Pereira, defender Germano, and midfielder Augusto Silva all left the club.

Pre-season began with a 3–2 victory over Belenenses, followed by a four-match tour of the Americas: a 2–1 win against Junior Barranquilla, a 4–0 win against Club Guaraní, a 3–2 win against Barcelona S.C., and two 1–1 draws with Boca Juniors.

Later, a 3–1 victory over Sporting CP sent Benfica to the final of the Taça de Honra, where they defeated Atlético 6–0.

The official season began on 9 September with a 2–1 home win against Vitória de Guimarães in the opening league match. In the following three rounds, Benfica recorded victories over Barreirense, Braga, and Vitória de Setúbal, finishing the month level on points with Porto. In Europe, Benfica eliminated Glentoran on away goals, drawing 1–1 away and 0–0 at home.

Next, they played the Costa Pereira tribute match, drawing 2–2 with Atlético Madrid. This was followed by a 13–1 aggregate win over Montijo in the first round of the Taça de Portugal, a 0–0 away draw with Belenenses, and a 6–0 home win against Leixões. November began with a 0–0 away draw against Tirsense, followed by a 2–0 home victory over Saint-Étienne and a 1–0 defeat in France, which was enough to advance to the next round of the European Cup. Riera left the club following the 1–0 defeat, after being dismissed by president Adolfo Vieira de Brito, with Fernando Cabrita appointed as caretaker manager. Benfica began December with three consecutive league victories before losing 3–1 away to Sporting CP, ending the month level on points with their rivals. The new year started with a 3–2 home win against Porto, followed by a 1–1 away draw with Varzim.

In February, the team won its first three league matches before falling 3–2 in Setúbal, finishing the month two points behind Sporting. March proved more successful: Benfica won all three of their league games, eliminated Sanjoanense 4–2 on aggregate in the Taça de Portugal, and defeated Vasas SC 3–0 on aggregate in the European Cup quarter-finals. April brought mixed results. Benfica began with a 2–0 away defeat to CUF, after which Otto Glória returned as coach. Under his leadership, the team beat Sanjoanense 6–0, drew 1–1 with Académica in Coimbra, and defeated Sporting 1–0 at home, finishing the month one point clear at the top of the table. In May, Benfica drew 1–1 with Porto at home and beat Varzim 1–0, securing the league title.

Still in May, Benfica overcame Juventus 2–0 at home and 1–0 away to reach the European Cup final. In the Taça de Portugal, they defeated Barreirense 5–3 on aggregate before being eliminated 5–2 on aggregate by Porto in the semi-finals.

On 29 May, Benfica faced Manchester United in the European Cup final at Wembley Stadium, losing 4–1 after extra time.

== Competitions ==
Win Draw Loss Postponed

=== Overall record ===
Competition	First match	Last match	Record								
Competition	First match	Last match	G	W	D	L	GF	GA	GD	Win %	Source
Primeira Divisão	9 September 1967	12 May 1968	26	18	5	3	75	19	+56	69.23	
Taça de Portugal	8 October 1967	9 June 1968	8	5	2	1	24	11	+13	62.50	
European Cup	13 September 1967	29 May 1968	9	4	3	2	10	6	+4	44.44	
Total			43	27	10	6	109	36	+73	62.79	

== League standings ==
Pos	Team	Pld	W	D	L	GF	GA	GD	Pts	Qualification or relegation
1	Benfica (C)	26	18	5	3	75	19	+56	41	Qualification to European Cup first round
2	Sporting CP	26	17	3	6	48	24	+24	37	Qualification to Inter-Cities Fairs Cup first round
3	Porto	26	16	4	6	60	24	+36	36	Qualification to Cup Winners' Cup first round
4	Académica	26	15	5	6	53	24	+29	35	Qualification to Inter-Cities Fairs Cup first round
5	Vitória de Setúbal	26	14	6	6	43	20	+23	34	Qualification to Inter-Cities Fairs Cup first round

Source: RSSSF
(C) Champions

=== Matches ===
9 September 1967 1	Benfica	2–1	Vitória de Guimarães	Lisbon
	Eusébio 42'; Jacinto 87'		António Mendes 14'	Stadium: Estádio da Luz; Referee: Renato Santos

17 September 1967 2	Barreirense	0-3	Benfica	Barreiro
			Eusébio 24', 57'; Torres 35'	Stadium: Estádio D. Manuel de Mello; Referee: Manuel Fortunato

24 September 1967 3	Braga	0–1	Benfica	Braga
			Augusto 33'	Stadium: Estádio 28 de Maio; Referee: Caetano Nogueira

30 September 1967 4	Benfica	2–1	Vitória de Setúbal	Lisbon
	Eusébio 74' (penalty); Jaime Graça 79'		Pedras 19' (penalty)	Stadium: Estádio da Luz; Referee: João Pinto Ferreira

22 October 1967 5	Belenenses	0–0	Benfica	Oeiras
				Stadium: Jamor; Referee: Joaquim Campos

29 October 1967 6	Benfica	6–0	Leixões	Lisbon
	Torres 1', 40', 75'; Coluna 71'; Eusébio 82'; Amaro Vieira 88'			Stadium: Estádio da Luz; Referee: Ismael Baltazar

5 November 1967 7	Tirsense	0–0	Benfica	Santo Tirso
				Stadium: Estádio Abel Alves de Figueiredo; Referee: Diogo Manso

5 December 1967 8	Benfica	3–1	CUF	Lisbon
	Eusébio 41'; Augusto 49'; Coluna 84'		José Monteiro 83'	Stadium: Estádio da Luz

10 December 1967 9	Sanjoanense	1–4	Benfica	São João da Madeira
	Alvarez 71'		Eusébio 41', 52' (penalty), 60', 90'	Stadium: Estádio Conde Dias Garcia; Referee: Marcos Lobato

24 December 1967 10	Benfica	3–1	Académica	Lisbon
	Torres 38', 77'; Eusébio 62'		Artur Jorge 41'	Stadium: Estádio da Luz

31 December 1967 11	Sporting	3–1	Benfica	Lisbon
	Figueiredo 4'; Lourenço 20'; José Henrique 90' (o.g.)		Jacinto 90' (pen.); Coluna (red card)	Stadium: Estádio José Alvalade; Referee: Décio de Freitas

7 January 1968 12	Benfica	3–2	Porto	Lisbon
	Eusébio 20' (penalty); Torres 23', 66'		Valdir 35', 60'	Stadium: Estádio da Luz; Referee: Porfírio Silva

14 January 1968 13	Varzim	1–1	Benfica
	Nunes Pinto 32'		Eusébio 1'

4 February 1967 14	Vitória de Guimarães	0–4	Benfica	Guimarães
			Eusébio 11', 49', 82'; Torres 34'	Stadium: Estádio D. Afonso Henriques

11 February 1968 15	Benfica	8–2	Barreirense	Estádio da Luz
	Torres 8', 16', 60'; Eusébio 18', 58', 64 65'; Augusto 88'		José Ludovico 24'; José Testas 87'

19 February 1968 16	Benfica	3–0	Braga	Lisbon
	Eusébio 9', 72'; José Manuel 28' (o.g.)			Stadium: Estádio da Luz

25 February 1968 17	Vitória de Setúbal	2–0	Benfica
	Jacinto João 10'; Petita 21'

3 March 1968 18	Benfica	7–0	Belenenses	Lisbon
	Torres 20', 81'; Augusto 22'; Eusébio 33', 65', 76', 84'			Stadium: Estádio da Luz

10 March 1968 19	Leixões	0–2	Benfica
			Eusébio 6', 65'

31 March 1968 20	Benfica	5–0	Tirsense	Lisbon
	Eusébio 8', 59', 87'; Simões 63'; Coluna 85'			Stadium: Estádio da Luz

7 April 1968 21	CUF	2–0	Benfica	Barreiro
	Fernando 26'; Capitão Mor 55'			Stadium: Estádio Alfredo da Silva

14 April 1968 22	Benfica	6–0	Sanjoanense	Lisbon
	Torres 12'; Eusébio 13', 30' (penalty), 43', 81'; Almeida 81' (o.g.)			Stadium: Estádio da Luz

21 April 1968 23	Académica	1–1	Benfica	Coimbra
	Artur Jorge 60'		Jacinto 22'	Stadium: Estádio Cidade de Coimbra; Referee: Manuel Fortunato

28 April 1968 24	Benfica	1–0	Sporting	Lisbon
	Eusébio 8'			Stadium: Estádio da Luz; Attendance: 80,000; Referee: Aníbal Oliveira

5 May 1968 25	Porto	1–1	Benfica	Porto
	Djalma 84'		Eusébio 86'	Stadium: Estádio das Antas; Referee: Marcos Mateus Pereira

12 May 1968 26	Benfica	8–0	Varzim	Lisbon
	Eusébio 45', 52', 63', 80', 87', 89'; Torres 19', 39'			Stadium: Estádio da Luz

=== Taça de Portugal ===
==== First round ====
8 October 1967 First leg	Montijo	1–4	Benfica	Montijo
			Camolas 7', 16'; Yaúca 59', 60'	Stadium: Campo Luís de Almeida Fidalgo; Referee: Mário Alves

15 October 1967 Second leg	Benfica	9–0 (13–1 agg.)	Montijo	Lisbon
	Yaúca 9', 25', 30', 64'; Camolas 29', 80'; Diamantino Costa 46'; Amaro Vieira 67', 70'			Stadium: Estádio da Luz; Referee: Saldanha Ribeiro

==== Second round ====
17 March 1968 First leg	Benfica	2–1	Sanjoanense	Lisbon
	Augusto 10', 28'		Walter Ferreira 32'	Stadium: Estádio da Luz

24 March 1968 Second leg	Sanjoanense	2–4 (1–2 agg.)	Benfica	São João da Madeira
	José Henrique 37' (o.g.)		Eusébio 23'; Augusto 74'	Stadium: Estádio Conde Dias Garcia; Referee: Fernando Leite

==== Quarter-Finals ====
19 May 1968 First leg	Barreirense	2–2	Benfica	Barreiro
	António Garrido 52'; José Ludovico 54'		Raul Águas 34'; Jacinto 75' (penalty)	Stadium: Estádio D. Manuel de Mello; Referee: Décio de Freitas

23 May 1968 Second leg	Benfica	3–1 (5–3 agg.)	Barreirense	Lisbon
	Augusto 25' (penalty), 59'; Raul Águas 54'		António Garrido 12'	Stadium: Estádio da Luz; Referee: João Calado

==== Semi-Finals ====
2 June 1968 First leg	Benfica	2–2	Porto	Lisbon
	Eusébio 11'; Jaime Graça 56'		Djalma 44', 61'	Stadium: Estádio da Luz; Referee: Saldanha Ribeiro

9 June 1968 Second leg	Porto	3–0 (5–2 agg.)	Benfica	Porto
	Djalma 47', 70'; Pavão 83'			Stadium: Estádio das Antas; Referee: Ismael Baltazar

=== First Round ===
13 September 1967	Glentoran (Northern Ireland)	1–1	(Portugal) Benfica	The Oval, Belfast
	Colrain 10' (pen.)	Report	Eusébio 86'	Attendance: 24,750; Referee: Roger Barde (France)

4 October 1967	Benfica (Portugal)	0–0 (1–1 agg.)	(Northern Ireland) Glentoran	Estádio da Luz, Lisbon
		Report		Attendance: 36,844; Referee: Robert Schaut (Belgium)

=== Second Round ===
16 November 1967	Benfica (Portugal)	2–0	(France) Saint-Étienne	Estádio da Luz, Lisbon
	José Augusto 28'; Eusébio 59' (pen.)	Report		Attendance: 22,804; Referee: John Adair (Northern Ireland)

30 November 1967	Saint-Étienne (France)	1–0 (2–1 agg.)	(Portugal) Benfica	Stade Geoffroy-Guichard, Saint-Étienne
	Bereta 10'	Report		Attendance: 24,480; Referee: Marian Środecki (Poland)

=== Quarter-Finals ===
6 March 1968	Vasas (Hungary)	0–0	(Portugal) Benfica	Népstadion, Budapest
		Report		Attendance: 36,394; Referee: Kurt Waldemar Tschenscher (West Germany)

14 March 1968	Benfica (Portugal)	3–0 (3–0 agg.)	(Hungary) Vasas	Estádio da Luz, Lisbon
	Eusébio 48', 70'; Torres 77'	Report		Attendance: 49,336; Referee: Laurens van Ravens (Netherlands)

=== Semi-Finals ===
9 May 1968	Benfica (Portugal)	2–0	(Italy) Juventus	Estádio da Luz, Lisbon
	Torres 64'; Eusébio 70'	Report		Attendance: 69,375; Referee: Roger Barde (France)

15 May 1968	Juventus (Italy)	0–1 (0–3 agg.)	(Portugal) Benfica	Stadio Comunale, Turin
		Report	Eusébio 66'	Attendance: 62,570; Referee: Rudolf Glöckner (East Germany)

=== Final ===
29 May 1968	Benfica (Portugal)	1–4 (a.e.t.)	(England) Manchester United	Wembley Stadium, London
	Graça 79'	Report	Charlton 53', 99'; Best 92'; Kidd 94'	Attendance: 92,225; Referee: Concetto Lo Bello (Italy)

=== Friendlies ===
5 August 1967	Benfica	3–2	Belenenses	Lisbon
	Augusto; Eusébio; Torres			Stadium: Estádio da Luz

13 August 1967	Junior Barranquilla	1–2	Benfica	Barranquilla
			Eusébio; Torres	Stadium: Estadio Romelio Martínez

15 August 1967	Club Guaraní	0–4	Benfica	Asunción
			Torres; Eusébio	Stadium: Estadio Defensores del Chaco

20 August 1967	Barcelona S.C.	2–3	Benfica	Guayaquil
			Eusébio; Simões	Stadium: Estadio Modelo Alberto Spencer Herrera

23 August 1967	Benfica	1–1	Boca Juniors	San Francisco
	Eusébio			Stadium: Kezar Stadium

26 August 1967	Benfica	1–1	Boca Juniors	Los Angeles
	Eusébio			Stadium: Memorial Coliseum

30 August 1967; Taça de Honra; Semi-Finals	Benfica	3–1	Sporting	Belém
	Coluna 6'; Torres 21'; Eusébio 28'		Peres 70'	Stadium: Estádio do Restelo

4 September 1967; Taça de Honra; Finals	Benfica	6–0	Atlético	Belém
	Torres 34', 37', 44'; Simões 52'; Jaime Graça 63'; Eusébio 78'			Stadium: Estádio do Restelo

11 October 1967 Costa Pereira tribute	Benfica	2–2	Atlético Madrid	Lisbon
	Eusébio; Augusto			Stadium: Estádio da Luz

18 October 1967	Mixed Algarve Team	0–6	Benfica	Faro
				Stadium: Estádio São Luís

1 November 1967	Atlético Madrid	1–2	Benfica	Madrid
			Eusébio	Stadium: Estádio Vicente Calderón

25 January 1968	São Paulo FC	3–2	Benfica	São Paulo
	Renato Jacaré 51' (penalty); Ismael 78'		Eusébio	Stadium: Estádio Cícero Pompeu de Toledo

13 June 1968	LR Vicenza	2–1	Benfica	Vicenza
			Jacinto	Stadium: Stadio Romeo Menti

== Player statistics ==
The squad for the season consisted of the players listed in the tables below, as well as staff member Fernando Riera (manager), Otto Glória (manager), Fernando Cabrita (assistant manager).

Note 1: Note: Flags indicate national team as defined under FIFA eligibility rules. Players may hold more than one non-FIFA nationality.

Note 2: Players with squad numbers marked ‡ joined the club during the 1967–68 season via transfer, with more details in the following section.

No.	Pos	Nat	Player	Total		Primeira Divisão		Taça de Portugal		European Cup	
No.	Pos	Nat	Player	Apps	Goals	Apps	Goals	Apps	Goals	Apps	Goals
1	GK	(Portugal) POR	Alfredo Nascimento	0	4	0	4	0	0	0	0
1	GK	(Portugal) POR	José Henrique	39	0	26	0	4	0	9	0
	DF	(Portugal) POR	Augusto Matine	2	0	0	0	2	0	0	0
	DF	(Portugal) POR	Fernando Severino	4	0	2	0	2	0	0	0
	DF	(Portugal) POR	Kiki Barros	2	0	0	0	2	0	0	0
	DF	(Portugal) POR	Malta da Silva	2	0	0	0	2	0	0	0
2	DF	(Portugal) POR	Adolfo Calisto	24	0	15	0	4	0	5	0
2	DF	(Portugal) POR	Domiciano Cavém	18	0	11	0	3	0	4	0
3	MF	(Portugal) POR	Humberto Fernandes	31	0	20	0	3	0	8	0
4	DF	(Portugal) POR	Jacinto	32	4	21	3	3	1	8	0
4	DF	(Portugal) POR	Raul Machado	29	0	20	0	6	0	3	0
5	DF	(Portugal) POR	Fernando Cruz	38	0	24	0	5	0	9	0
	MF	(Portugal) POR	Amaro Vieira	8	3	4	1	3	2	1	0
	MF	(Portugal) POR	António Paula	3	0	0	0	3	0	0	0
	MF	(Portugal) POR	Camolas	3	4	1	0	2	4	0	0
	MF	(Portugal) POR	Diamantino Costa	2	1	0	0	2	1	0	0
6	MF	(Portugal) POR	José Ferreira Pinto	5	0	1	0	4	0	0	0
	MF	(Portugal) POR	Jorge Calado	5	0	2	0	2	0	1	0
	MF	(Portugal) POR	Nélson Fernandes	9	0	4	0	3	0	2	0
	MF	(Portugal) POR	Raul Águas	6	0	3	0	2	0	1	0
6	MF	(Portugal) POR	Jaime Graça	33	3	21	1	4	1	8	1
7	MF	(Portugal) POR	Mário Coluna	33	3	20	3	5	0	8	0
8	FW	(Portugal) POR	José Augusto	40	10	25	4	6	5	9	1
8	FW	(Portugal) POR	Santana	1	0	0	0	1	0	0	0
9	FW	(Portugal) POR	José Torres	29	19	22	17	0	0	7	2
9	FW	(Portugal) POR	Iaúca	7	6	3	0	3	6	1	0
10	FW	(Portugal) POR	Eusébio	35	51	24	43	2	2	9	6
11	FW	(Portugal) POR	António Simões	31	1	19	1	5	0	7	0
