= Maximiano =

Portuguese footballer

Personal information
- Full name: Maximiano Oliveira Salvador
- Date of birth: 25 February 1942 (age 84)
- Position: Defender

Youth career
- –1961: Benfica

Senior career*
Years	Team	Apps	(Gls)
1961–1963	Benfica	1	(0)
Total		1	(0)

International career
1960	Portugal U18	1	(0)
- * Club domestic league appearances and goals

Maximiano Oliveira Salvador (born 25 February 1942) is a former Portuguese professional footballer.

== Career statistics ==
=== Club ===
Club	Season	League			Cup		Other		Total	
Club	Season	Division	Apps	Goals	Apps	Goals	Apps	Goals	Apps	Goals
Benfica	1960–61	Primeira Divisão	0	0	1	0	0	0	1	0
Benfica	1961–62	Primeira Divisão	0	0	0	0	0	0	0	0
Benfica	1962–63	Primeira Divisão	1	0	1	0	0	0	2	0
Career total			1	0	2	0	0	0	3	0
