= Moreira (footballer, born 1941) =

Portuguese footballer

Personal information
- Full name: António Francisco Nunes Moreira
- Date of birth: 20 October 1941 (age 85)
- Height: 1.73 m (5 ft 8 in)
- Position: Midfielder

Youth career
- 1957–1961: Benfica

Senior career*
Years	Team	Apps	(Gls)
1961	Benfica	1	(0)
1961–1962	Atlético CP	23	(4)
1964–1965	Vitória Guimarães	5	(0)
Total		29	(4)
- * Club domestic league appearances and goals

António Francisco Nunes Moreira (born 20 October 1941) is a former Portuguese professional footballer.

== Career statistics ==
=== Club ===
Club	Season	League			Cup		Other		Total	
Club	Season	Division	Apps	Goals	Apps	Goals	Apps	Goals	Apps	Goals
Benfica	1960–61	Primeira Divisão	1	0	4	0	0	0	5	0
Atlético CP	1961–62	Primeira Divisão	23	4	2	2	0	0	25	6
Vitória Guimarães	1964–65	Primeira Divisão	5	0	0	0	0	0	5	0
Career total			29	4	6	2	0	0	35	6
