= Seixal Clube 1925 =

Football club in Setúbal District, Portugal

- Full name: Seixal Clube 1925
- Founded: 2012
- Ground: Estádio do Bravo, Seixal
- Capacity: 2,000
- League: AF Setúbal 1st Division
- 2025-26: AF Setúbal 2nd Division Group B, 1st place (First Stage); Champion Group, 1st (champions)

Seixal Clube 1925 is a Portuguese sports club from Seixal, in the Setúbal District. The club was founded in 2012 succeeding Seixal F.C.
