= Armando Ramalho =

Portuguese footballer

Personal information
- Full name: Armando Ramalho Correia de Almeida
- Date of birth: 15 June 1938 (age 88)
- Position: Goalkeeper

Youth career
- –1961: Benfica

Senior career*
Years	Team	Apps	(Gls)
1961–1962	Benfica	0	(0)
1962–1963	Sporting Covilhã		
- * Club domestic league appearances and goals

Armando Ramalho Correia de Almeida (born 15 June 1938) is a former Portuguese professional footballer.

== Career statistics ==
=== Club ===
Club	Season	League			Cup		Other		Total	
Club	Season	Division	Apps	Goals	Apps	Goals	Apps	Goals	Apps	Goals
Benfica	1960–61	Primeira Divisão	0	0	1	0	0	0	1	0
Benfica	1961–62	Primeira Divisão	0	0	2	0	0	0	2	0
Career total			0	0	3	0	0	0	3	0
