= Domiciano Cavém =

Portuguese footballer and manager

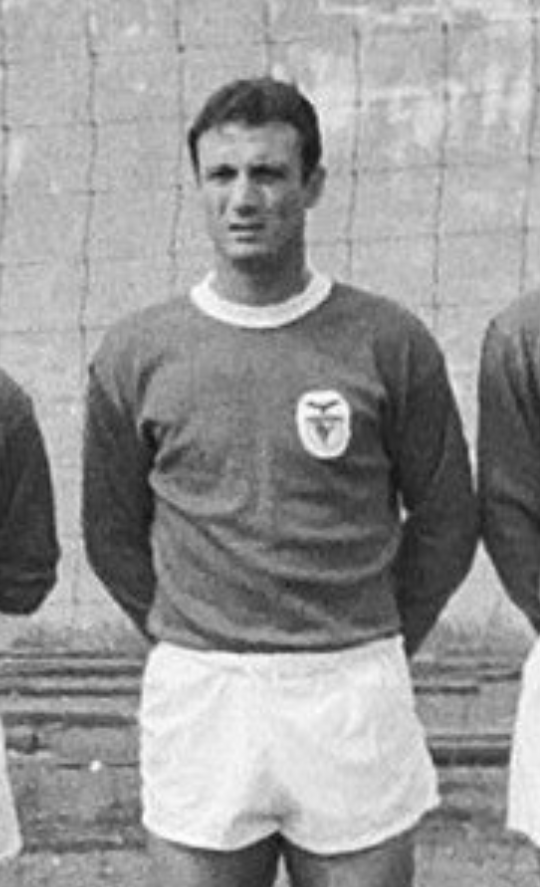
- Cavém with Benfica in 1965

Personal information
- Full name: Domiciano Barrocal Gomes Cavém
- Date of birth: 21 November 1932
- Place of birth: Vila Real de Santo António, Portugal
- Date of death: 12 January 2005 (aged 72)
- Place of death: Leiria, Portugal
- Height: 1.78 m (5 ft 10 in)
- Positions: Forward; midfielder; right-back

Youth career
- 1947–1949: Celeiros
- 1949–1950: Lusitano

Senior career*
Years	Team	Apps	(Gls)
1950–1953	Lusitano		
1953–1955	Covilhã	49	(18)
1955–1969	Benfica	279	(78)
1969–1970	Nazarenos		

International career
1956–1965	Portugal	18	(5)
- * Club domestic league appearances and goals

Domiciano Barrocal Gomes Cavém (21 November 1932 – 12 January 2005) was a Portuguese footballer who played mainly for Benfica in several positions, but mostly as a left winger or right-back.

He appeared in 420 competitive games for his main club, scoring 104 goals and winning 16 major titles, including two European Cups.

== Club career ==
Born in Vila Real de Santo António, Algarve, Cavém was the son of football player and manager Norberto Cavém (born 1904), being coached by his father at local club Lusitano FC. He signed with S.L. Benfica in 1955 from S.C. Covilhã where he had featured alongside his brother Amílcar (1930), first displaying his versatility by playing as an inside forward, a centre-forward or a left winger.

During his 14-year spell with the Lisbon side, Cavém gradually became a more defensive unit, first being a midfielder then a right or left-back. In the 1958–59 season he scored a career-best 21 goals, helping them to win the Primeira Liga and the eventual double – in the Taça de Portugal final, against FC Porto, he netted the fastest-ever goal in the competition, after just 15 seconds for an eventual 1–0 win.

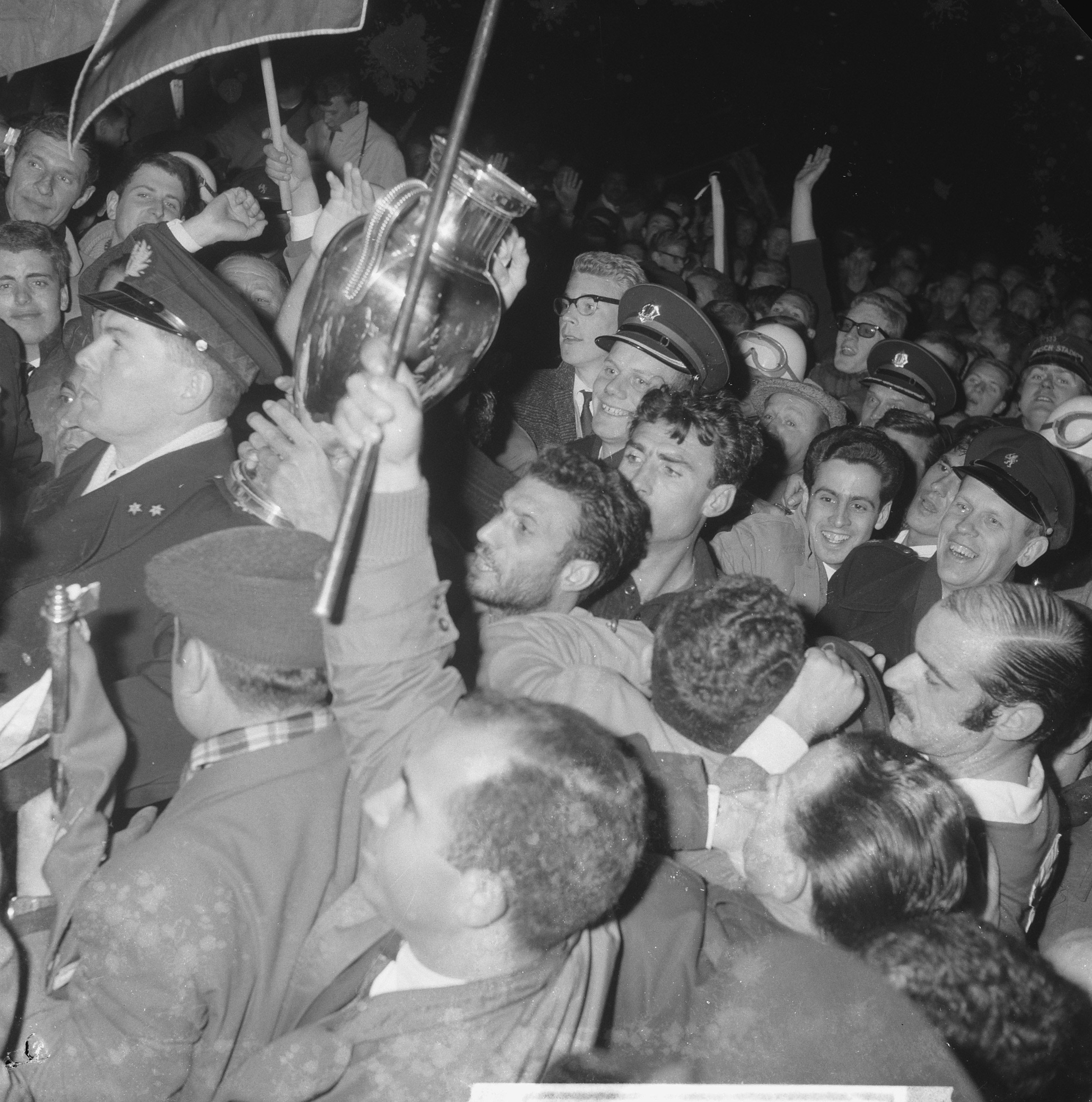
Cavém (center) holding Benfica's second European Cup after the final on 2 May 1962

Cavém was present in four of the five European Cup finals played by Benfica in the 60s, winning the 1961 and 1962 editions and scoring in the latter against Real Madrid (5–3). He retired professionally in 1969, at the age of 36.

== International career ==
Cavém earned 18 caps for Portugal, and scored five times. He made his debut on 8 April 1956 in a 1–0 friendly defeat to Brazil, his last appearance being against the same opponent on 24 June 1965 (0–0 draw).

Cavém featured once in the 1966 FIFA World Cup qualifying campaign, the 2–1 home win over Romania in the Portuguese capital. He was overlooked for the finals in England, as the national team finished in a best-ever third-position.

== Post-retirement ==
After retiring, Cavém embarked in a managerial career, with little success. He subsequently settled in Alcobaça, dying on 12 January 2005 in the hospital of Leiria after a battle with Alzheimer's disease; he was 72 years old.

== Honours ==
Benfica

- Primeira Liga: 1956–57, 1959–60, 1960–61, 1962–63, 1963–64, 1964–65, 1966–67, 1967–68, 1968–69
- Taça de Portugal: 1956–57, 1958–59, 1961–62, 1963–64, 1968–69
- Taça de Honra (3)
- European Cup: 1960–61, 1961–62
- Intercontinental Cup runner-up: 1961, 1962
