= Costa Pereira =

Portuguese footballer

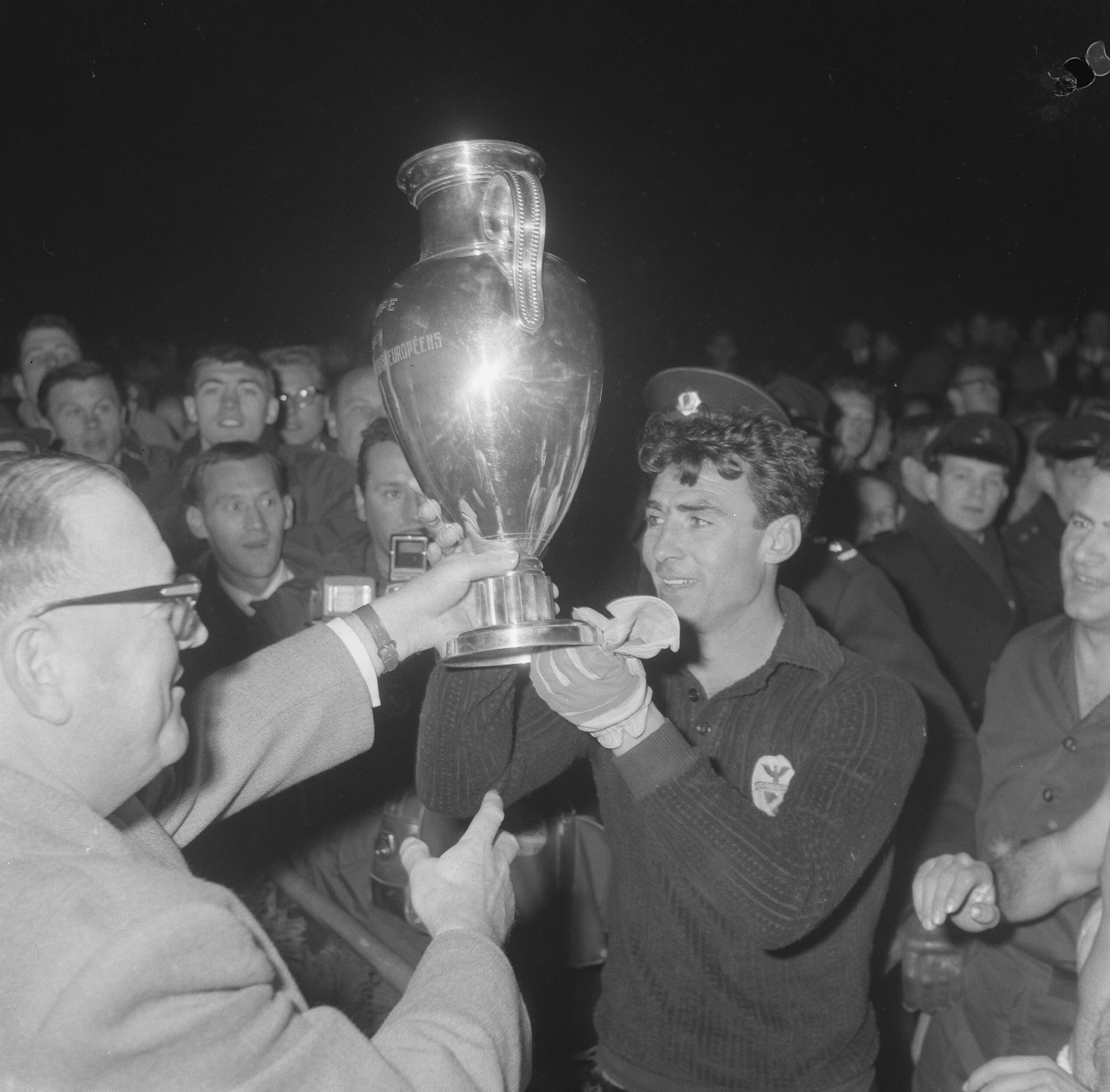
- Costa Pereira (right) holding Benfica's second European Cup after the final on 2 May 1962

Personal information
- Full name: Alberto da Costa Pereira
- Date of birth: 22 December 1929
- Place of birth: Nacala, Mozambique
- Date of death: 25 October 1990 (aged 60)
- Place of death: Lisbon, Portugal
- Height: 1.88 m (6 ft 2 in)
- Position: Goalkeeper

Youth career
- Sporting Lourenço Marques
- Instituto Portugal
- Mocidade Portuguesa

Senior career*
Years	Team	Apps	(Gls)
1951–1954	Ferroviário		
1954–1967	Benfica	253	(0)

International career
1955–1965	Portugal	22	(0)

Managerial career
- 1968–1969: CUF
- * Club domestic league appearances and goals

Alberto da Costa Pereira (22 December 1929 – 25 October 1990) was a Portuguese footballer who played as a goalkeeper.

== Club career ==
Born in Nacala, Portuguese Mozambique from a colonial White African family, Costa Pereira was noticed by S.L. Benfica while playing with Clube Ferroviário de Lourenço Marques. He signed for the Portuguese side in 1954 and immediately became first-choice, making 26 appearances in his first season and winning the first of his seven Primeira Liga championships.

Internationally, Costa Pereira won two consecutive European Cups in 1961 and 1962, and lost two finals in 1963 and 1965. In the latter, against Inter Milan at the San Siro, a Jair attempt late in the first half slid under his body and entered the net for the game's only goal; he was also injured shortly after, and had to be replaced by defender Germano since substitutes were not allowed, and Benfica played more than 30 minutes with ten players.

Costa Pereira retired in June 1967 aged 37, having appeared in 358 official matches for his main club. In the 1968–69 campaign, he acted as manager of G.D. CUF.

== International career ==
Costa Pereira played 22 times for Portugal. His debut came on 22 May 1955, against England in Porto (3–1 win).

Costa Pereira started the successful qualifying campaign to the 1966 FIFA World Cup, featuring in a 5–1 victory over Turkey in Lisbon on 24 January 1965. He was, however, overlooked for the finals by coach Otto Glória – his former boss at Benfica – due to poor form, as the national team went on to finish in third place.

== Death ==
Costa Pereira died in Lisbon on 25 October 1990, at 60.

== Honours ==
Benfica

- Primeira Liga: 1954–55, 1959–60, 1960–61, 1962–63, 1963–64, 1964–65, 1966–67
- Taça de Portugal: 1954–55, 1956–57, 1958–59, 1961–62, 1963–64
- Taça de Honra (1)
- European Cup: 1960–61, 1961–62
- Intercontinental Cup runner-up: 1961, 1962

Individual

- World Soccer World XI: 1965
