= 1961 European Cup final =

- Match programme cover
- Event: 1960–61 European Cup
Barcelona	Benfica
(Spain)	(Portugal)
2	3
- Date: 31 May 1961
- Venue: Wankdorf Stadium, Bern
- Referee: Gottfried Dienst (Switzerland)
- Attendance: 26,732

The 1961 European Cup final was held at the Wankdorf Stadium, Bern on 31 May 1961, and was contested by Spanish side Barcelona against Portuguese side Benfica. This was the first final not to include Real Madrid, who had won the previous five finals. Benfica lifted the trophy for the first time, beating Barcelona 3–2.

== Route to the final ==
Five-time defending champions Real Madrid were knocked out in the first round by Barcelona, their bitter domestic rivals. After defeating Czechoslovak champions Hradec Králové in the quarter-finals, Barcelona initially drew 2–2 on aggregate with West German champions Hamburger SV in the semi-finals. Since this was before UEFA competitions began using the away goals rule, in order to determine who would advance to the final, a replay was scheduled to be played at a neutral site on 3 May. Barça would qualify for the final by winning the replay 1–0 at the King Baudouin Stadium in Brussels, with Evaristo scoring the decisive goal.

Meanwhile, Benfica reached the final of the competition by eliminating Austrian champions Rapid Wien in a 4–1 semi-final aggregate win. This marked the first time that a team from Portugal had ever progressed this far into the competition.

(Spain) Barcelona				Round	(Portugal) Benfica			
Opponent	Agg.	1st leg	2nd leg		Opponent	Agg.	1st leg	2nd leg
(Belgium) Lierse	5–0	2–0 (H)	3–0 (A)	Prelim. round	(Scotland) Heart of Midlothian	5–1	2–1 (A)	3–0 (H)
(Spain) Real Madrid	4–3	2–2 (A)	2–1 (H)	First round	(Hungary) Újpesti Dózsa	7–4	6–2 (H)	1–2 (A)
(Czechoslovakia) Spartak Hradec Králové	5–1	4–0 (H)	1–1 (A)	Quarter-finals	(Denmark) AGF Aarhus	7–2	3–1 (H)	4–1 (A)
(West Germany) Hamburger SV	2–2 (Replay: 1–0)	1–0 (H)	1–2 (A)	Semi-finals	(Austria) Rapid Wien	4–1	3–0 (H)	1–1 (A)

== Match ==
=== Summary ===
Prior to the European Cup final at Wankdorf Stadium, Bern, on 31 May 1961, Barcelona were labelled as the heavy favourites in the media. Sándor Kocsis gave the Catalan side the lead in the 21st minute of the match. With Benfica having just tied the game 1–1 in the 31st minute with José Águas, referee Gottfried Dienst awarded a controversial own goal to Benfica a minute later, when a misplaced defensive header drifted back towards Barcelona's goalkeeper and captain Antoni Ramallets, who pushed the ball against the crossbar, and it subsequently appeared to bounce along his goal line.

Benfica midfielder Mario Coluna broke his nose in the eighth minute of the match; not wanting to risk further damage, when Domiciano Cavém put over a cross in the 55th minute, Coluna hung back outside the penalty area. The ball was cleared directly to him and he volleyed it home for Benfica's third goal of the match. In the 75th minute, Zoltán Czibor scored the final goal of the match for Barcelona to bring the score to 3–2. Benfica went on to lift the trophy for the first time.

=== Details ===
31 May 1961
19:00 CEST

Barcelona (Spain)	2–3	(Portugal) Benfica
Kocsis 21'; Czibor 75'	Report	Águas 31'; Ramallets 32' (o.g.); Coluna 55'

Wankdorf Stadium, Bern
Attendance: 26,732
Referee: Gottfried Dienst (Switzerland)

Barcelona	Benfica

GK	1	(Spain) Antoni Ramallets (c)
RB	2	(Spain) Foncho
CB	3	(Spain) Enric Gensana
LB	4	(Spain) Sígfrid Gràcia
RH	5	(Spain) Martí Vergés
LH	6	(Spain) Jesús Garay
OR	7	(Spain) (Note: Along with Kocsis and Czibor, Kubala was one of three Hungarian-born players in Barcelona's line-up. However, Kubala was the only one to adopt Spanish nationality, having fled communist rule in his homeland in 1948 and subsequently taken refuge in Spain. He had begun representing Spain in international play in 1953.) László Kubala
IR	8	(Hungary) Sándor Kocsis
CF	9	(Brazil) Evaristo
IL	10	(Spain) Luis Suárez
OL	11	(Hungary) Zoltán Czibor
Manager:
(Spain) Enrique Orizaola

GK	1	(Portugal) Costa Pereira
RB	2	(Portugal) Mário João
CB	3	(Portugal) Germano
LB	4	(Portugal) Ângelo Martins
RH	5	(Portugal) José Neto
LH	6	(Portugal) Fernando Cruz
OR	7	(Portugal) José Augusto
IR	8	(Portugal) Santana
CF	9	(Portugal) José Águas (c)
IL	10	(Portugal) Mário Coluna
OL	11	(Portugal) Domiciano Cavém
Manager:
(Hungary) Béla Guttmann

== See also ==
- 1960–61 FC Barcelona season
- 1960–61 S.L. Benfica season
- 1961 European Cup Winners' Cup final
- 1961 Inter-Cities Fairs Cup final
- 1961 Intercontinental Cup
- FC Barcelona in international football
- S.L. Benfica in international football
