= António Mendes (footballer) =

Portuguese footballer (1939–2019)

Personal information
- Full name: António da Silva Mendes
- Date of birth: 18 October 1939
- Place of birth: Lisbon, Portugal
- Date of death: 27 February 2019 (aged 79)
- Place of death: Guimarães, Portugal
- Position: Striker

Youth career
- 1955–1956: Benfica

Senior career*
Years	Team	Apps	(Gls)
1956–1962	Benfica	27	(19)
1962–1971	Vitória Guimarães	204	(76)

International career
	Portugal U21	1	(2)
1966	Portugal	1	(0)
- * Club domestic league appearances and goals

António da Silva Mendes (18 October 1939 – 27 February 2019), nicknamed "Pé Canhão" (cannon foot) was a Portuguese footballer who played as forward.

Mendes gained one cap for Portugal against Sweden in Lisbon on 13 November 1966, in a 1–2 defeat.

== Honours ==
Benfica

- Primeira Liga: 1959–60, 1960–61
- Taça de Portugal: 1958–59, 1960–61
- Intercontinental Cup runner-up: 1961
