= Germano de Figueiredo =

Portuguese footballer (1932–2004)

Germano
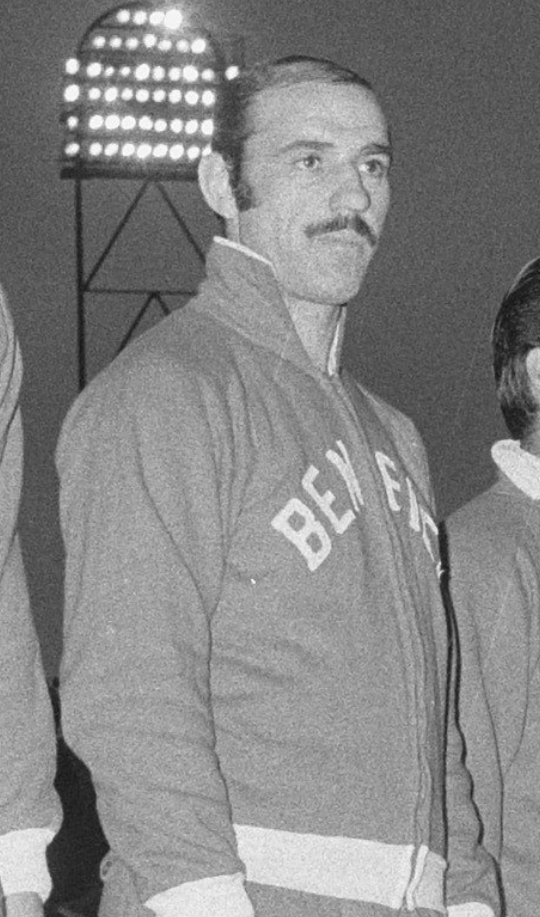
- Germano lining up before the 1962 European Cup final

Personal information
- Full name: Germano Luís de Figueiredo
- Date of birth: 23 December 1932
- Place of birth: Alcântara, Portugal
- Date of death: 14 July 2004 (aged 71)
- Place of death: Linda-a-Velha, Portugal
- Height: 1.83 m (6 ft 0 in)
- Position: Centre-back

Youth career
- 1947–1951: Atlético

Senior career*
| Years | Team | Apps | (Gls) |
| 1951–1960 | Atlético | 115 | (16) |
| 1960–1966 | Benfica | 75 | (4) |
| 1966–1967 | Salgueiros | | |

International career
| 1953–1966 | Portugal | 24 | (0) |
Medal record
Men's football
Representing Portugal
FIFA World Cup
| Third place | 1966 England |
- * Club domestic league appearances and goals

Germano Luís de Figueiredo (23 December 1932 – 14 July 2004), simply known as Germano (Portuguese pronunciation: [ʒɨɾˈmɐnu]), was a Portuguese footballer who played as a central defender.

He spent most of his professional career with Benfica, appearing in 131 official matches and winning eight major titles, including two European Cups.

Germano represented Portugal at the 1966 World Cup.

== Club career ==
Born in Alcântara, Lisbon, Germano started playing with local Atlético Clube de Portugal, spending seven of his nine seasons in the Primeira Liga. In the summer of 1960 he moved to neighbouring S.L. Benfica, where he remained the following six years, being a leading defensive unit of the sides that won four national championships and two European Cups (against FC Barcelona and Real Madrid); in the latter competition's 1964–65 edition, he was placed in goal following his teammate's Costa Pereira injury in the final against Inter Milan, and kept a clean sheet for more than 30 minutes, albeit in a 1–0 loss.

Germano retired in 1967, after one year with S.C. Salgueiros of the Segunda Liga. He died in Linda-a-Velha, at the age of 71.

== International career ==
Germano won 24 caps for Portugal over 13 years. He was part of the squad that appeared at the 1966 FIFA World Cup, but only played the second game against Bulgaria in a third-place finish.

== Style of play ==
A hard-working and strong-tackling defender, Germano was noted for his towering presence in Benfica's back-three defending formation, alongside left-back Ângelo and right-back Mário João. He possessed excellent ball control.

Germano ranked 53rd in UEFA's 50 Greatest Footballers of the Last 50 Years jubilee list.

== Honours ==
Benfica

- Primeira Liga: 1960–61, 1962–63, 1963–64, 1964–65
- Taça de Portugal: 1961–62, 1963–64
- Taça de Honra (2)
- European Cup: 1960–61, 1961–62

Atlético

- Segunda Liga: 1958–59

Portugal

- FIFA World Cup third place: 1966

Individual

- World Soccer World XI: 1961, 1962, 1965
