= Gottfried Dienst =

Swiss football referee (1919–1998)

- Born: 9 September 1919; Basel, Switzerland
- Died: 1 June 1998 (aged 78); Bern, Switzerland

International
Years	League	Role
1957–1968	FIFA-listed	Referee

Gottfried Dienst (Basel, 9 September 1919 – Bern, 1 June 1998) was a Swiss association football referee. He was mostly known as the referee of the 1966 FIFA World Cup final.

== Career ==
Dienst is one of only four men to have twice refereed a European Cup final, which he did in 1961 and 1965; he also uniquely took charge of two different European club competition finals in 1965, officiating the 1965 Inter-Cities Fairs Cup final, in addition to the aforementioned European Cup final. In the 1961 European Cup, with the score tied, he controversially awarded Benfica a goal when a misplaced defensive header drifted back towards Barcelona's goalkeeper and captain Antoni Ramallets, who pushed the ball against the crossbar, and it subsequently bounced along his goal line; Benfica ultimately won the match 3–2.

Dienst is also one of only two (the other being Italian referee Sergio Gonella) to have refereed both the European Championship and World Cup finals, in 1968 and 1966 respectively. He refereed the original 1968 European Championship final, which ended in a 1–1 draw between Italy and Yugoslavia. The final was replayed two days later; refereed by the Spaniard José María Ortiz de Mendíbil, when the Italians won 2–0. In a similar manner to the 1961 European Cup final incident, Dienst was also involved in a controversial goal decision in the 1966 World Cup final at Wembley Stadium, London, between hosts England and West Germany. In extra-time, Geoff Hurst appeared to score a goal to give England a 3–2 lead; however, although the goal was given by linesman Tofiq Bahramov, the German players insisted that the ball had not fully crossed the line. To this day, doubt persists in the media over whether the goal should have counted or not. England ultimately defeated West Germany 4–2 after extra time. In total, Dienst refereed five matches in World Cup tournaments, including one of the semi-finals in the 1962 edition of the tournament.

== Major matches refereed ==
Date	Match	Tournament	Venue	Result	Ref
31 May 1961	Barcelona vs. Benfica	1961 European Cup final	Wankdorf Stadium, Bern	2–3	
27 May 1965	Inter Milan vs. Benfica	1965 European Cup final	San Siro, Milan	1–0	
23 June 1965	Ferencváros vs. Juventus	1965 Inter-Cities Fairs Cup final	Stadio Comunale, Turin	1–0	
30 July 1966	England vs. West Germany	1966 FIFA World Cup final	Wembley Stadium, London	4–2 (a.e.t.)	
8 June 1968	Italy vs. Yugoslavia	UEFA Euro 1968 final	Stadio Olimpico, Rome	1–1 (a.e.t) (Italy won 2–0 when the replay took place two days later)	

Sporting positions (Switzerland) Gottfried Dienst
Preceded by 1960 European Cup Final (Scotland); Jack Mowat	1961 European Cup Final Referee	Succeeded by 1962 European Cup Final (Netherlands); Leo Horn
Preceded by 1964 European Cup Final (Austria); Josef Stoll	1965 European Cup Final Referee	Succeeded by 1966 European Cup Final (West Germany); Rudolf Kreitlein
Preceded by 1962 FIFA World Cup Final (Soviet Union); Nikolay Latyshev	1966 FIFA World Cup Final Referee	Succeeded by 1970 FIFA World Cup Final (East Germany); Rudi Glöckner
Preceded by 1964 European Nations' Cup Final (England); Arthur Holland	UEFA Euro 1968 Final Referee	Succeeded by UEFA Euro 1972 Final (Austria); Ferdinand Marschall
