= 1967–68 Primeira Divisão =

34th season of top-tier Portuguese football

Primeira Liga
- Season: 1967–68
- Champions: Benfica; 16th title
- Matches: 182
- Goals: 524 (2.88 per match)
- Top goalscorer: Eusébio (42 goals)

The 1967–68 Primeira Divisão was the 34th season of top-tier football in Portugal.

== Overview ==
It was contested by 14 teams, and S.L. Benfica won the championship.

== League standings ==
Pos	Team	Pld	W	D	L	GF	GA	GD	Pts	Qualification or relegation
1	Benfica (C)	26	18	5	3	75	19	+56	41	Qualification to European Cup first round
2	Sporting CP	26	17	3	6	48	24	+24	37	Qualification to Inter-Cities Fairs Cup first round
3	Porto	26	16	4	6	60	24	+36	36	Qualification to Cup Winners' Cup first round
4	Académica	26	15	5	6	53	24	+29	35	Qualification to Inter-Cities Fairs Cup first round
5	Vitória de Setúbal	26	14	6	6	43	20	+23	34	Qualification to Inter-Cities Fairs Cup first round
6	Vitória de Guimarães	26	12	3	11	31	34	−3	27	
7	Belenenses	26	10	5	11	38	40	−2	25	
8	Leixões	26	10	4	12	29	39	−10	24	Qualification to Inter-Cities Fairs Cup first round
9	Braga	26	9	3	14	29	48	−19	21	
10	Sanjoanense	26	7	7	12	22	40	−18	21	
11	CUF Barreiro	26	7	7	12	28	37	−9	21	
12	Varzim	26	7	3	16	27	50	−23	17	
13	Tirsense (R)	26	5	5	16	17	53	−36	15	Relegation to Segunda Divisão
14	Barreirense (R)	26	3	4	19	24	72	−48	10	Relegation to Segunda Divisão

Source: RSSSF
(C) Champions; (R) Relegated

== Results ==
Home \ Away	ACA	BAR	BEL	BEN	BRA	CUF	LEI	POR	SJN	SCP	TIR	VAR	VGU	VSE
Académica		2–0	3–1	1–1	5–1	1–0	2–1	1–1	3–0	2–0	4–1	5–0	3–0	3–0
Barreirense	1–1		0–6	0–3	0–1	3–2	0–0	1–5	0–1	1–1	1–0	4–1	1–2	1–1
Belenenses	3–2	4–1		0–0	2–0	2–1	2–1	0–2	3–0	4–0	0–1	3–1	3–2	2–2
Benfica	3–1	8–2	7–0		3–0	3–1	6–0	3–2	6–0	1–0	5–0	8–0	2–1	2–1
Braga	1–1	4–3	1–0	0–1		1–1	0–1	2–3	2–0	3–1	3–0	1–1	0–1	1–3
CUF Barreiro	0–3	1–0	0–0	2–0	1–2		1–1	2–1	3–2	0–1	5–0	1–2	1–1	1–1
Leixões	0–2	3–0	1–0	0–2	0–2	0–0		2–1	2–1	1–2	2–0	3–0	3–1	0–1
Porto	1–0	3–2	4–0	1–1	4–2	4–0	1–0		3–0	0–1	9–0	3–0	3–1	2–0
Sanjoanense	0–0	1–0	1–1	1–4	3–0	2–0	2–3	1–1		0–3	1–0	2–0	0–0	0–0
Sporting CP	3–1	3–0	3–0	3–1	6–0	4–0	3–2	0–0	3–1		0–0	1–0	2–1	0–1
Tirsense	0–4	3–2	2–1	0–0	0–1	0–0	0–1	1–3	2–2	3–5		2–0	1–2	0–0
Varzim	2–3	5–1	3–0	1–1	2–1	0–2	2–0	1–0	0–0	1–2	0–1		0–1	3–1
Vitória de Guimarães	2–0	3–0	1–0	0–4	2–0	2–3	1–1	2–1	0–1	1–0	1–0	3–2		0–2
Vitória de Setúbal	2–0	8–0	1–1	2–0	4–0	1–0	7–1	1–2	1–0	0–1	1–0	1–0	1–0	

Legend: Blue = home team win; Yellow = draw; Red = away team win.
