= Seixal F.C. =

Portuguese sports club

Seixal
- Full name: Seixal Futebol Clube
- Founded: 1925
- Ground: Estádio do Bravo, Seixal
- Capacity: 2,000
- Chairman: Enrique de Jesus Cosmeli Bráz
| Home colours | Away colours |

Seixal Futebol Clube was a Portuguese sports club from Seixal, in the Setúbal district. The club had a main football squad but it folded in 2007 due to financial reasons.

The club's football divisions play their games at the Estádio do Bravo which holds a capacity of 2,000. The club was founded in 1925, and its main section is rink hockey (playing at 3 Division, zone D). It was also a basketball and a futsal club.

== Appearances (football) ==
- Premier Division: 2 (twice)
- Second Division: 28
- Third Division: 36

== League and cup history ==
The club has two presences at the top level of Portuguese football.

| Season | | Pos. | Pl. | W | D | L | GS | GA | P | Notes |
|---|---|---|---|---|---|---|---|---|---|---|
| 1963–64 | 1D | 12 | 26 | 4 | 6 | 16 | 28 | 66 | 14 | |
| 1964–65 | 1D | 13 | 26 | 3 | 2 | 21 | 16 | 84 | 8 | Relegated |
| 1969–70 | 2D | 9 | 26 | 7 | 12 | 7 | 23 | 32 | 26 | |
| 1992–93 | | 5 | 34 | 10 | 18 | 6 | 41 | 26 | 38 | |
| 1993–94 | | 6 | 34 | 15 | 8 | 11 | 50 | 36 | 38 | |
| 1994–95 | | 6 | 34 | 15 | 8 | 11 | 41 | 28 | 38 | |
| 1995–96 | 3D | 7 | 34 | 13 | 10 | 11 | 45 | 34 | 49 | |
| 1996–97 | 3D | | 34 | - | - | | - | - | | Promoted |
| 1997–98 | 2D | 4 | 34 | 17 | 8 | 9 | 52 | 35 | 59 | |
| 1998–99 | 2D | 16 | 34 | 9 | 6 | 19 | 43 | 51 | 33 | Relegated |
| 2002–03 | 2D | 20 | 38 | 7 | 8 | 23 | 34 | 54 | 29 | Relegated |
| 2003–04 | 3D | 10 | 34 | 12 | 8 | 14 | 55 | 52 | 44 | |
| 2004–05 | 3D | 18 | 34 | 5 | 9 | 20 | 27 | 60 | 23 | Relegated |
| 2005–06 | AF | 13 | 30 | 7 | 11 | 12 | 37 | 49 | 32 | |
| 2006–07 | AF | 5 | 30 | 15 | 8 | 7 | 40 | 30 | 53 | Removed and Dissolved |

== Honours ==
- Terceira Divisão: 2

- 1960–61, 1967–68

- Taça Ribeiro dos Reis: 1

- 1961–62
