= 1961–62 Primeira Divisão =

28th season of top-tier Portuguese football

Primeira Liga
- Season: 1961–62
- Champions: Sporting CP; 11th title
- Matches: 182
- Goals: 617 (3.39 per match)

Statistics of Portuguese Liga in the 1961–62 season.

== Overview ==
It was contested by 14 teams, and Sporting Clube de Portugal won the championship.

== Details of participants ==
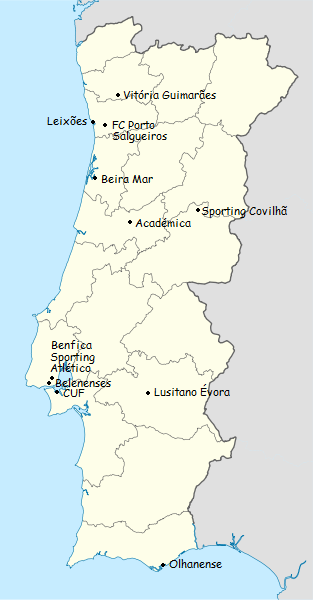
Location of teams in 1961–62 Primeira Liga

Details of the 14 participants are provided below:

Clubs	Seasons at this level	Settlements	Season joined league	Position in 1960/1961
Benfica	28 seasons	Lisbon	1934/1935	1
Sporting	28 seasons	Lisbon	1934/1935	2
FC Porto	28 seasons	Porto	1934/1935	3
Belenenses	28 seasons	Lisbon	1934/1935	5
Académica	27 seasons	Coimbra	1949/1950	7
Vitória Guimarães	18 seasons	Guimarães	1958/1959	4
Atlético	16 seasons	Lisbon	1959/1960	10
Sporting Covilhã	13 seasons	Covilhã	1958/1959	9
Olhanense	11 seasons	Olhão	1961/1962	Segunda Divisão
Lusitano Évora	10 seasons	Évora	1952/1953	11
CUF	9 seasons	Barreiro	1954/1955	6
Salgueiros	6 seasons	Porto	1960/1961	12
Leixões	5 seasons	Matosinhos	1959/1960	8
Beira Mar	1 season	Aveiro	1961/1962	Segunda Divisão

== League standings ==
Pos	Team	Pld	W	D	L	GF	GA	GD	Pts	Qualification or relegation
1	Sporting CP (C)	26	19	5	2	66	17	+49	43	Qualified for the European Cup
2	Porto	26	18	5	3	57	16	+41	41	Invited for the Inter-Cities Fairs Cup
3	Benfica (Note: Benfica qualified directly to the first round as title holders.)	26	14	8	4	69	38	+31	36	Qualified for the European Cup
4	CUF Barreiro	26	14	5	7	44	34	+10	33	
5	Belenenses	26	12	7	7	51	35	+16	31	Invited for the Inter-Cities Fairs Cup
6	Atlético CP	26	11	4	11	41	42	−1	26	
7	Leixões	26	10	3	13	47	55	−8	23	
8	Olhanense	26	8	6	12	33	41	−8	22	
9	Vitória de Guimarães	26	9	4	13	44	47	−3	22	
10	Académica de Coimbra	26	9	4	13	44	54	−10	22	
11	Beira-Mar (R)	26	8	5	13	43	61	−18	21	Relegated to Segunda Divisão
12	Lusitano de Évora	26	9	2	15	31	42	−11	20	
13	Sporting da Covilhã (R)	26	6	5	15	30	48	−18	17	Relegated to Segunda Divisão
14	Salgueiros (R)	26	2	3	21	17	87	−70	7	Relegated to Segunda Divisão

Source: RSSSF
(C) Champions; (R) Relegated

== Results ==
Home \ Away	ACA	ACP	BEM	BEL	BEN	CUF	LEI	LUS	OLH	POR	SCP	SCO	SAL	VGU
Académica		2–2	7–1	2–1	3–1	0–1	5–2	2–0	1–2	0–2	0–3	0–0	8–1	3–0
Atlético CP	3–0		4–1	0–3	0–3	0–0	4–1	1–0	3–0	1–4	0–3	2–1	7–0	3–3
Beira-Mar	1–1	0–1		0–3	2–3	0–3	3–1	4–0	1–0	1–1	1–1	1–1	3–0	3–1
Belenenses	2–0	0–2	4–1		2–2	5–1	6–3	1–0	1–0	3–3	0–1	4–2	4–0	1–1
Benfica	4–2	2–1	8–1	0–0		1–1	7–1	3–1	4–2	1–1	3–3	1–1	8–1	1–0
CUF Barreiro	6–2	3–0	2–2	2–0	1–3		2–1	3–1	4–3	2–1	1–3	2–0	4–0	1–0
Leixões	5–0	2–0	3–2	1–1	1–2	2–1		3–0	2–0	0–0	2–1	2–1	5–0	2–3
Lusitano de Évora	5–0	0–1	2–1	1–3	0–1	0–0	4–0		2–1	0–2	1–3	3–0	2–1	4–1
Olhanense	2–2	3–1	6–2	3–1	1–1	0–0	0–0	0–1		1–1	1–1	1–0	2–0	1–0
Porto	1–0	4–1	2–0	5–0	2–1	5–0	3–1	4–0	4–0		0–2	2–0	1–0	3–0
Sporting CP	4–0	4–0	2–1	3–1	3–1	3–0	5–0	0–0	4–1	0–1		3–0	6–0	2–1
Sporting da Covilhã	1–2	1–0	3–4	1–1	2–1	0–2	2–1	1–2	2–0	1–4	0–2		4–2	4–2
Salgueiros	1–2	1–1	0–4	0–3	4–5	0–2	0–4	1–0	1–3	0–1	1–1	1–1		1–0
Vitória de Guimarães	3–0	1–3	2–3	1–1	2–2	2–0	3–2	5–2	2–0	1–0	1–3	3–1	6–1	

Legend: Blue = home team win; Yellow = draw; Red = away team win.

== Leading scorer ==
Azumir Veríssimo (Futebol Clube do Porto) was the top scorer of the season with 23 goals.

Rank	Player		Club	Goals
1	Azumir	(Brazil)	FC Porto	23

== Promotion and relegation 1962/1963 ==
Relegation to Segunda Divisão

- Beira Mar
- Sporting Covilhã
- Salgueiros

Promotion to Primeira Divisão

- Vitória Setúbal
- Barreirense
- Feirense
