= 1964–65 Primeira Divisão =

31st season of top-tier Portuguese football

Primeira Liga
- Season: 1964–65
- Champions: Benfica; 14th title
- Matches: 182
- Goals: 614 (3.37 per match)
- Top goalscorer: Eusébio (28 goals)

The 1964–65 Primeira Divisão was the 31st season of top-tier football in Portugal.

== Overview ==
It was contested by 14 teams, and S.L. Benfica won the championship.

== League standings ==
Pos	Team	Pld	W	D	L	GF	GA	GD	Pts	Qualification or relegation
1	Benfica (C)	26	19	5	2	88	21	+67	43	Qualification to European Cup preliminary round
2	Porto	26	17	3	6	47	27	+20	37	Qualification to Inter-Cities Fairs Cup first round
3	CUF Barreiro	26	15	5	6	49	29	+20	35	Qualification to Inter-Cities Fairs Cup first round
4	Académica	26	16	2	8	58	40	+18	34	
5	Sporting CP	26	12	8	6	39	35	+4	32	Qualification to Inter-Cities Fairs Cup first round
6	Vitória de Setúbal	26	15	2	9	61	30	+31	32	Qualification to Cup Winners' Cup first round
7	Vitória de Guimarães	26	12	5	9	44	36	+8	29	
8	Belenenses	26	12	2	12	39	40	−1	26	
9	Leixões	26	8	5	13	50	51	−1	21	
10	Braga	26	8	4	14	36	51	−15	20	
11	Varzim	26	8	4	14	39	55	−16	20	
12	Lusitano de Évora	26	9	2	15	30	51	−21	20	
13	Seixal (R)	26	3	2	21	16	84	−68	8	Relegation to Segunda Divisão
14	Torreense (R)	26	3	1	22	18	64	−46	7	Relegation to Segunda Divisão

Source: RSSSF
(C) Champions; (R) Relegated

== Results ==
Home \ Away	ACA	BEL	BEN	BRA	CUF	LEI	LUS	POR	SEI	SCP	SCT	VAR	VGU	VSE
Académica		4–1	2–2	2–1	1–2	5–3	3–0	1–4	5–0	3–0	2–0	5–1	1–2	1–1
Belenenses	3–0		0–6	2–1	1–2	3–2	2–1	0–1	5–1	1–2	1–0	2–1	2–2	1–2
Benfica	3–0	3–2		7–0	1–1	5–0	5–0	4–0	11–3	3–0	6–0	5–0	4–0	3–2
Braga	2–3	1–2	1–2		2–1	1–1	2–0	2–0	6–0	1–2	4–0	1–1	1–0	2–1
CUF Barreiro	3–1	1–1	2–0	4–1		2–1	0–1	2–0	3–0	0–1	4–1	2–1	3–1	3–0
Leixões	5–1	3–0	1–1	2–1	3–3		4–0	1–3	6–0	3–3	3–0	3–0	1–1	2–3
Lusitano Évora	1–2	1–5	0–0	2–0	3–1	2–1		2–5	4–1	1–1	6–0	0–1	1–2	0–2
Porto	1–2	2–0	1–0	1–1	2–0	3–1	1–0		6–0	1–3	2–0	3–1	4–2	1–0
Seixal	1–3	0–1	0–4	3–0	2–2	0–3	0–2	1–2		0–0	2–1	1–2	0–1	0–1
Sporting CP	2–4	1–0	2–2	3–1	0–0	1–0	2–0	1–1	1–0		4–0	3–2	1–2	3–2
Torreense	0–3	0–2	1–3	5–0	0–1	3–0	1–2	1–2	0–1	3–0		0–0	1–3	0–4
Varzim	0–2	0–1	1–4	0–0	2–3	5–1	0–1	2–0	6–0	3–1	3–1		1–1	4–1
Vitória de Guimarães	1–0	2–1	1–2	2–3	1–2	4–0	2–0	0–0	1–0	2–2	2–0	7–1		1–2
Vitória de Setúbal	1–2	1–0	1–2	5–1	2–1	1–0	8–0	0–1	8–0	0–0	4–0	7–1	2–1	

Legend: Blue = home team win; Yellow = draw; Red = away team win.
