= 1962–63 Primeira Divisão =

29th season of top-tier Portuguese football

Primeira Liga
- Season: 1962–63
- Champions: Benfica; 12th title
- Matches: 182
- Goals: 596 (3.27 per match)

The 1962–63 Primeira Divisão was the 29th season of top-tier football in Portugal.

== Overview ==
It was contested by 14 teams, and Benfica won the championship.

== League standings ==
| Pos | Team | Pld | W | D | L | GF | GA | GD | Pts | Qualification or relegation |
|---|---|---|---|---|---|---|---|---|---|---|
| 1 | Benfica (C) | 26 | 23 | 2 | 1 | 81 | 25 | +56 | 48 | Qualification to European Cup preliminary round |
| 2 | Porto | 26 | 19 | 4 | 3 | 61 | 24 | +37 | 42 | Qualification to Inter-Cities Fairs Cup first round |
| 3 | Sporting CP | 26 | 18 | 2 | 6 | 71 | 31 | +40 | 38 | Qualification to Cup Winners' Cup first round |
| 4 | Belenenses | 26 | 16 | 4 | 6 | 47 | 30 | +17 | 36 | Qualification to Inter-Cities Fairs Cup first round |
| 5 | Leixões | 26 | 10 | 10 | 6 | 34 | 33 | +1 | 30 | |
| 6 | Vitória de Guimarães | 26 | 12 | 3 | 11 | 47 | 43 | +4 | 27 | |
| 7 | Lusitano de Évora | 26 | 9 | 5 | 12 | 33 | 41 | −8 | 23 | |
| 8 | Olhanense | 26 | 7 | 7 | 12 | 29 | 38 | −9 | 21 | |
| 9 | Vitória de Setúbal | 26 | 6 | 8 | 12 | 33 | 39 | −6 | 20 | |
| 10 | Académica | 26 | 8 | 3 | 15 | 49 | 50 | −1 | 19 | |
| 11 | Barreirense | 26 | 5 | 8 | 13 | 20 | 56 | −36 | 18 | |
| 12 | CUF Barreiro | 26 | 6 | 6 | 14 | 37 | 40 | −3 | 18 | |
| 13 | Atlético CP (R) | 26 | 8 | 1 | 17 | 33 | 65 | −32 | 17 | Relegation to Segunda Divisão |
| 14 | Feirense (R) | 26 | 3 | 1 | 22 | 21 | 81 | −60 | 7 | Relegation to Segunda Divisão |

Source: RSSSF
(C) Champions; (R) Relegated

== Results ==
| Home \ Away | ACA | ACP | BAR | BEL | BEN | CUF | FEI | LEI | LUS | OLH | POR | SCP | VGU | VSE |
|---|---|---|---|---|---|---|---|---|---|---|---|---|---|---|
| Académica | | 6–0 | 8–0 | 1–2 | 0–2 | 4–1 | 8–0 | 1–1 | 1–3 | 1–0 | 0–2 | 4–3 | 0–2 | 2–1 |
| Atlético CP | 1–0 | | 3–1 | 1–2 | 0–3 | 3–2 | 5–2 | 4–2 | 3–5 | 2–1 | 2–3 | 0–2 | 0–5 | 2–1 |
| Barreirense | 1–0 | 2–0 | | 0–1 | 1–3 | 3–0 | 0–0 | 1–1 | 0–0 | 3–0 | 1–1 | 1–5 | 1–3 | 0–0 |
| Belenenses | 3–1 | 1–0 | 4–0 | | 1–4 | 1–0 | 4–1 | 0–1 | 1–0 | 4–2 | 1–1 | 1–0 | 6–0 | 3–1 |
| Benfica | 5–1 | 2–0 | 8–1 | 1–0 | | 3–1 | 6–0 | 2–0 | 2–1 | 1–1 | 1–2 | 4–3 | 6–2 | 3–2 |
| CUF Barreiro | 2–0 | 3–0 | 1–1 | 1–1 | 2–3 | | 4–0 | 0–1 | 6–0 | 2–1 | 1–2 | 1–2 | 1–1 | 0–1 |
| Feirense | 2–1 | 2–0 | 1–2 | 1–3 | 1–6 | 0–2 | | 0–4 | 1–2 | 1–0 | 1–2 | 1–4 | 1–3 | 0–2 |
| Leixões | 1–1 | 1–1 | 0–0 | 1–2 | 0–0 | 1–1 | 3–2 | | 1–1 | 4–1 | 2–0 | 1–0 | 1–0 | 2–1 |
| Lusitano Évora | 3–3 | 3–1 | 0–0 | 3–2 | 1–3 | 3–1 | 2–1 | 1–2 | | 2–0 | 0–1 | 0–1 | 0–1 | 1–0 |
| Olhanense | 3–0 | 2–0 | 4–0 | 0–0 | 0–1 | 2–2 | 1–0 | 2–0 | 1–0 | | 3–3 | 1–1 | 2–0 | 0–0 |
| Porto | 3–1 | 5–0 | 3–0 | 5–1 | 1–2 | 2–0 | 3–1 | 2–0 | 5–0 | 4–0 | | 1–3 | 2–1 | 3–2 |
| Sporting CP | 5–1 | 5–3 | 2–0 | 3–0 | 1–3 | 2–1 | 7–0 | 6–0 | 2–1 | 5–1 | 0–1 | | 4–2 | 2–1 |
| Vitória de Guimarães | 2–1 | 1–2 | 5–0 | 1–2 | 3–4 | 2–2 | 2–1 | 1–1 | 2–1 | 2–1 | 0–3 | 0–1 | | 3–0 |
| Vitória de Setúbal | 2–3 | 3–0 | 3–1 | 1–1 | 0–3 | 1–0 | 5–1 | 3–3 | 0–0 | 0–0 | 1–1 | 2–2 | 0–3 | |

Legend: Blue = home team win; Yellow = draw; Red = away team win.
