= 1963–64 Primeira Divisão =

30th season of top-tier Portuguese football

Primeira Liga
- Season: 1963–64
- Champions: Benfica; 13th title
- Relegated: Olhanense; Barreirense
- European Cup: Benfica
- Cup Winners' Cup: Porto
- Inter-Cities Fairs Cup: Belenenses; Leixões
- Matches: 182
- Goals: 609 (3.35 per match)
- Top goalscorer: Eusébio (28 goals)
- Biggest home win: Benfica 10–0 Seixal
- Biggest away win: Leixões 1–5 Benfica; Académica de Coimbra 1–5 Benfica
- Highest scoring: Benfica 10–0 Seixal

The 1963–64 Primeira Divisão was the 30th season of top-tier football in Portugal.

== Overview ==
It was contested by 14 teams, and S.L. Benfica won the championship.

== League standings ==
Pos	Team	Pld	W	D	L	GF	GA	GD	Pts	Qualification or relegation
1	Benfica (C)	26	21	4	1	103	26	+77	46	Qualification to European Cup preliminary round
2	Porto	26	16	8	2	51	20	+31	40	Qualification to Cup Winners' Cup first round
3	Sporting CP	26	13	8	5	49	26	+23	34	Qualification to Cup Winners' Cup first round
4	Vitória de Guimarães	26	16	2	8	62	42	+20	34	
5	CUF Barreiro	26	12	6	8	46	33	+13	30	
6	Belenenses	26	12	6	8	46	36	+10	30	Qualification to Inter-Cities Fairs Cup first round
7	Vitória de Setúbal	26	12	5	9	46	41	+5	29	
8	Leixões	26	8	9	9	34	44	−10	25	Qualification to Inter-Cities Fairs Cup first round
9	Académica	26	11	3	12	43	48	−5	25	
10	Varzim	26	8	4	14	37	57	−20	20	
11	Lusitano de Évora	26	5	4	17	22	51	−29	14	
12	Seixal	26	4	6	16	28	66	−38	14	
13	Olhanense (R)	26	2	8	16	20	57	−37	12	Relegation to Segunda Divisão
14	Barreirense (R)	26	4	3	19	22	62	−40	11	Relegation to Segunda Divisão

Source: RSSSF
(C) Champions; (R) Relegated

== Results ==
Home \ Away	ACA	BAR	BEL	BEN	CUF	LEI	LUS	OLH	POR	SEI	SCP	VAR	VGU	VSE
Académica		3–0	1–0	1–5	2–1	2–3	3–0	3–1	1–2	7–1	0–3	2–0	0–3	2–0
Barreirense	3–4		0–0	2–4	0–1	1–3	2–1	0–0	1–3	1–1	1–0	1–2	0–1	0–3
Belenenses	0–2	2–0		1–1	1–1	4–1	3–0	2–1	1–1	1–2	4–2	4–1	0–3	3–0
Benfica	3–0	8–0	5–2		2–1	7–0	2–0	8–1	2–2	10–0	2–2	8–0	2–1	5–2
CUF Barreiro	6–2	2–1	2–2	0–3		2–0	2–1	4–1	1–0	6–2	4–0	2–0	3–1	2–2
Leixões	1–1	6–0	1–2	1–5	2–1		1–0	1–1	1–1	0–0	0–0	3–1	1–0	1–0
Lusitano Évora	2–1	1–0	1–2	1–3	1–0	2–2		2–1	0–3	1–1	1–1	0–1	2–5	1–2
Olhanense	2–2	1–4	0–1	0–3	0–0	1–1	2–0		1–1	0–1	0–2	0–1	1–0	1–1
Porto	1–1	3–0	3–2	1–1	3–1	1–0	1–0	3–0		3–1	2–1	3–0	2–1	5–0
Seixal	0–1	1–3	1–2	2–3	0–2	0–0	2–2	2–1	0–1		1–2	2–1	3–4	2–2
Sporting CP	1–0	3–1	2–1	3–1	0–0	5–1	4–1	1–1	0–0	4–0		2–0	5–0	1–2
Varzim	4–1	4–1	1–3	0–2	1–1	3–3	2–0	5–2	0–3	2–1	1–1		4–5	0–0
Vitória de Guimarães	2–1	2–0	2–1	1–4	4–0	2–1	4–0	5–1	2–2	4–2	1–1	5–2		3–2
Vitória de Setúbal	4–0	3–0	2–2	2–4	2–1	2–0	1–2	4–0	2–1	3–0	1–3	2–1	2–1	

Legend: Blue = home team win; Yellow = draw; Red = away team win.
