= 1960–61 Primeira Divisão =

27th season of top-tier Portuguese football

Primeira Divisão
- Season: 1960–61
- Champions: Benfica; 11th title
- Relegated: Braga; Barreirense
- European Cup: S.L. Benfica; Sporting CP
- Cup Winners' Cup: Leixões
- Fairs Cup: Belenenses
- Matches: 182
- Goals: 589 (3.24 per match)
- Top goalscorer: José Águas (27 goals)

The 1960–61 Primeira Divisão was the 27th season of top-tier football in Portugal.

== Overview ==
The competition was contested by 14 teams with S.L. Benfica winning the 1960–61 Primeira Divisão championship. It was the eleventh championship title for the club. Benfica also won the 1961–62 European Cup and qualified for the 1961–62 competition. This enabled second placed Sporting CP to also qualify for the European Cup. Leixões S.C. qualified for the Cup Winners' Cup and C.F. Os Belenenses for the Inter-Cities Fairs Cup. The two lowest placed teams of the competition, S.C. Braga and F.C. Barreirense were relegated to the Segunda Divisão.

== Details of participants ==
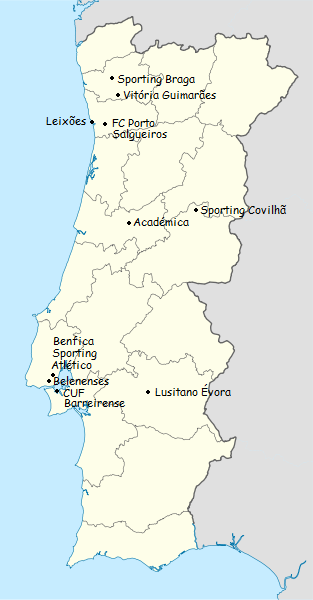
Location of teams in 1960–61 Primeira Liga

Details of the 14 participants are provided below:

Clubs	Seasons at this level	Settlements	Season joined league	Position in 1959–1960
Benfica	27 seasons	Lisbon	1934–1935	1
Sporting CP	27 seasons	Lisbon	1934–1935	2
Belenenses	27 seasons	Lisbon	1934–1935	3
Porto	27 seasons	Porto	1934–1935	4
Académica de Coimbra	26 seasons	Coimbra	1949–1950	6
Vitória de Guimarães	17 seasons	Guimarães	1958–1959	7
Atlético CP	15 seasons	Lisbon	1959–1960	11
Barreirense	14 seasons	Barreiro	1960–1961	Segunda Divisão
Sporting de Braga	13 seasons	Braga	1957–1958	12
Sporting da Covilhã	12 seasons	Covilhã	1958–1959	9
Lusitano de Évora	9 seasons	Évora	1952–1953	10
CUF Barreiro	8 seasons	Barreiro	1954–1955	5
Salgueiros	5 seasons	Porto	1960–1961	Segunda Divisão
Leixões	4 seasons	Matosinhos	1959–1960	8

== League standings ==
Pos	Team	Pld	W	D	L	GF	GA	GD	Pts	Qualification or relegation
1	Benfica (C)	26	22	2	2	92	21	+71	46	Qualified for the European Cup
2	Sporting CP (Note: Sporting CP qualified because Benfica were title holders in the European Cup.)	26	19	4	3	61	19	+42	42	Qualified for the European Cup
3	Porto	26	14	5	7	51	28	+23	33	
4	Vitória de Guimarães	26	14	2	10	48	44	+4	30	
5	Belenenses	26	12	4	10	45	37	+8	28	Invited for the Inter-Cities Fairs Cup
6	CUF Barreiro	26	10	6	10	38	28	+10	26	
7	Académica	26	10	6	10	31	29	+2	26	
8	Leixões	26	10	3	13	38	44	−6	23	Qualified for the Cup Winners' Cup
9	Sporting da Covilhã	26	8	5	13	27	55	−28	21	
10	Atlético CP	26	8	5	13	35	54	−19	21	
11	Lusitano de Évora	26	9	3	14	29	51	−22	21	
12	Salgueiros	26	8	4	14	34	64	−30	20	
13	Braga (R)	26	8	3	15	41	62	−21	19	Relegated to Segunda Divisão
14	Barreirense (R)	26	3	2	21	26	60	−34	8	Relegated to Segunda Divisão

Source: RSSSF
(C) Champions; (R) Relegated

== Results ==
Home \ Away	ACA	ACP	BAR	BEL	BEN	BRA	CUF	LEI	LUS	POR	SAL	SCP	SCO	VGU
Académica		0–1	3–0	0–1	0–2	3–1	0–0	1–1	0–0	2–1	2–0	0–1	4–2	2–1
Atlético CP	3–1		2–2	1–1	3–3	3–1	2–0	0–3	3–0	1–2	2–2	0–3	3–0	1–0
Barreirense	0–2	2–2		3–4	0–1	2–4	0–1	2–3	0–1	1–4	1–2	3–1	2–0	1–2
Belenenses	2–2	2–1	4–0		0–4	2–1	1–0	1–0	2–0	1–0	8–1	0–2	0–1	2–1
Benfica	4–1	7–2	3–0	4–2		7–1	4–1	4–1	5–0	2–0	8–1	1–0	8–0	4–0
Braga	0–2	3–0	5–3	1–1	0–4		1–1	2–1	0–1	0–4	5–1	1–3	3–0	2–1
CUF Barreiro	2–0	1–2	0–1	2–2	1–3	2–0		3–0	7–1	1–2	4–2	2–1	1–1	2–0
Leixões	1–1	3–1	1–0	2–0	0–3	3–2	0–2		3–1	3–2	1–3	1–3	2–2	0–2
Lusitano de Évora	1–0	4–0	1–0	1–0	1–2	3–2	2–1	1–2		0–1	2–2	0–3	0–1	3–0
Porto	0–1	5–0	4–1	1–0	3–2	1–1	1–1	1–0	4–0		1–2	0–0	4–0	2–2
Salgueiros	1–3	1–0	1–0	3–2	0–2	2–3	1–0	1–0	1–1	1–2		1–7	1–1	2–3
Sporting CP	1–0	3–0	4–0	2–1	1–1	6–1	1–0	3–1	4–2	1–1	2–1		2–1	4–1
Sporting da Covilhã	1–1	1–0	2–1	1–4	1–3	2–0	0–0	1–5	3–1	1–3	2–0	0–3		2–1
Vitória de Guimarães	2–0	4–2	3–1	3–2	2–1	4–1	0–3	2–1	5–2	4–2	2–1	0–0	3–1	

Legend: Blue = home team win; Yellow = draw; Red = away team win.

== Top scorer ==
José Águas (S.L. Benfica) was the top scorer of the season with 27 goals.

Rank	Player		Club	Goals
1	José Águas	(Portugal)	S.L. Benfica	27

== Promotion and relegation 1961–62 ==
Relegation to Segunda Divisão

- Braga
- Barreirense

Promotion to Primeira Divisão

- Olhanense
- Beira Mar
