= 1959–60 S.L. Benfica season =

Benfica
1959–60 season
- President: Maurício Vieira de Brito
- Head coach: Béla Guttmann
- Stadium: Estádio da Luz
- Primeira Divisão: 1st
- Taça de Portugal: Semi-finals
- Top goalscorer: League: José Augusto (19); All: José Águas (30)
- Biggest win: Benfica 10–0 Angrense (12 June 1960)
- Biggest defeat: Sporting 3–0 Benfica (19 June 1960)
Home colours	Away colours

The 1959–60 season was Sport Lisboa e Benfica's 56th season in existence and the club's 26th consecutive season in the top flight of Portuguese football, covering the period from 1 August 1959 to 30 July 1960. Benfica competed in the Primeira Divisão and in the Taça de Portugal.

The season marked the arrival of manager Béla Guttmann, who began reshaping the squad after the club had narrowly missed the previous league title. The team responded with a strong campaign, securing their tenth Primeira Divisão championship, matching Sporting's record, losing only one league match in the season. In the Taça de Portugal, Benfica reached the semi-finals, where they were eliminated by Sporting. The season also saw the emergence of several key players who would become central to the team's success in the years that followed.

== Season summary ==
After losing the league title on the final matchday, finishing level on points but with a lower goal difference than Porto, Benfica appointed Béla Guttmann as their new manager, replacing Otto Glória, who had coached the club for the previous five seasons. The off-season saw several departures, including long-time goalkeeper José Bastos, Mascarenhas, Fernando Caiado (who became Guttmann's assistant), António Hilário, Salvador Martins and Chino. Incoming transfers included Fernando Cruz, António Saraiva, José Augusto and José Torres.

The first match of the pre-season was a 2–1 victory over CUF in the Arsénio Duarte Tribute Game. Benfica then defeated Real Oviedo 1–0 before taking part in the Taça de Honra semi-finals, where they lost 1–0 to Belenenses. They concluded the tournament by beating Atlético CP 1–0 in the third-place match.

The official season began with a 4–1 home win over Vitória de Setúbal, followed by victories against Braga, Lusitano de Évora, and Boavista. Benfica then drew 1–1 away to Vitória de Guimarães, and concluded October with a 2–1 win over S.C. Covilhã, finishing the month with a two-point lead over Sporting.

In November, Benfica won all three of its league matches. On 6 December, the team hosted Porto at the Estádio da Luz, winning 2–1, and later drew 1–1 with Sporting at the Estádio José Alvalade. A subsequent 1–1 draw with Leixões, was followed by a 13–1 aggregate victory over Desportivo de Beja in the first round of the Taça de Portugal.

The new year began with a goalless draw against Belenenses, leaving Benfica level on points with Sporting at the top of the table at mid-season. The team then started a winning run from 10 January to 27 March, recording nine league victories and three wins in the Taça de Portugal. They ended March with a two-point lead in the league and a one-goal advantage in their Taça de Portugal round-of-16 tie.

April opened with two decisive league fixtures. Benfica first met Porto in O Clássico at the Estádio das Antas, drawing 2–2, a result that reduced their lead over Sporting to a single point. They then hosted Sporting in the Derby de Lisboa at the Estádio da Luz, winning 4–3 and extending the advantage to three points with two matches remaining. On the following matchday, Benfica defeated Leixões 2–1 to secure their tenth league title, drawing level with Sporting, who had overtaken Benfica's record two years earlier. In the final matchday, Benfica hosted Belenenses with the chance of becoming the first undefeated champion. Although Benfica took the lead, two goals from the visitors ended that possibility, leaving the club to wait until the 1972–73 campaign to achieve the feat.

Benfica concluded the season by resuming their campaign in the Taça de Portugal, defeating Angrense 12–0 on aggregate in the quarter-finals and setting up a Derby de Lisboa semi-final against Sporting. In the first leg, played at the Estádio José Alvalade, Benfica lost 3–0, with Fernando Cruz sent off when the team was trailing 1–0. A goalless draw in the second leg resulted in Benfica's elimination from the competition.

== Competitions ==
Win Draw Loss Postponed

=== Overall record ===
Competition	First match	Last match	Record								
Competition	First match	Last match	G	W	D	L	GF	GA	GD	Win %	Source
Primeira Divisão	20 September 1959	29 May 1960	26	20	5	1	75	27	+48	76.92	
Taça de Portugal	29 November 1959	25 June 1960	10	8	1	1	47	7	+40	80.00	
Total			36	28	6	2	116	34	+82	77.78	

=== Primeira Divisão ===
==== League table ====
Pos	Team	Pld	W	D	L	GF	GA	GD	Pts	Qualification or relegation
1	Benfica (C)	26	20	5	1	75	27	+48	45	Qualified for the European Cup
2	Sporting CP	26	19	5	2	82	20	+62	43	
3	Belenenses	26	15	6	5	58	25	+33	36	
4	Porto	26	13	4	9	48	36	+12	30	
5	CUF Barreiro	26	10	5	11	36	39	−3	25	

(C) Champions

==== Results by round ====
Round	1	2	3	4	5	6	7	8	9	10	11	12	13	14	15	16	17	18	19	20	21	22	23	24	25	26
Ground	H	A	H	A	A	H	A	H	A	H	A	H	A	A	H	A	H	H	A	H	A	H	A	H	A	H
Result	W	W	W	W	D	W	W	W	W	W	D	D	D	W	W	W	W	W	W	W	W	W	D	W	W	L
Position	5	2	2	1	2	1	1	1	1	1	1	1	1	1	1	1	1	1	1	1	1	1	1	1	1	1

Source: ForaDeJogo
A = Away; H = Home; W = Win; D = Draw; L = Loss

==== Matches ====
20 September 1959 1	Benfica	4–1	Vitória de Setúbal	Lisbon
16:00	Cavém 6'; Santana 30'; José Águas 44', 86'		55' Miguel	Stadium: Estádio da Luz; Referee: Reinaldo Silva

27 September 1959 2	Braga	0–3	Benfica	Braga
			21', 26' Cavém; 38' Augusto	Stadium: Estádio 28 de Maio

4 October 1959 3	Benfica	5–3	Lusitano de Évora	Lisbon
	Palmeiro 23'; Águas 63', 85'; Santana 67'; Augusto 75'		2' Ivson; 7' Jorge; 45' Fialho	Stadium: Estádio da Luz; Referee: Virgílio Baptista

11 October 1959 4	Boavista	0–2	Benfica	Porto
			27' Santana; 61' (pen.) Coluna	Stadium: Estádio do Bessa; Referee: Diogo Manso

18 October 1959 5	Vitória de Guimarães	1–1	Benfica	Guimarães
	Edmur 62'		80' Augusto	Stadium: Campo da Amorosa; Referee: Clemente Henriques

25 October 1959 6	Benfica	2–1	Covilhã	Lisbon
15:00	Torres 75'; Coluna 84'		28' Cardoso	Stadium: Estádio da Luz; Referee: Encarnação Salgado

1 November 1959 7	Atlético	0–4	Benfica	Lisbon
16:00			9' Coluna; 15' Santana; 63' Augusto; 75' José Águas	Stadium: Estádio da Tapadinha; Referee: Eduardo Gouveia

15 November 1959 8	Benfica	2–1	CUF	Lisbon
	Coluna 20' (pen.); Torres 40'		52' Pimentel	Stadium: Estádio da Luz; Referee: Manuel Fortunato

22 November 1959 9	Académica	0–2	Benfica	Coimbra
			63' José Águas; 77' Augusto	Stadium: Estádio Municipal de Coimbra; Referee: Clemente Henriques

6 December 1959 10	Benfica	2–1	Porto	Lisbon
	José Águas 19', 78'; Coluna (red card) 86'		54' Humaitá; (red card) 86' Castro	Stadium: Estádio da Luz; Referee: Inácio Tereso

13 December 1959 11	Sporting	1–1	Benfica	Lisbon
	Seminário 55'		59' Augusto	Stadium: Estádio José Alvalade; Referee: Raul Martins

20 December 1959 12	Benfica	1–1	Leixões	Lisbon
	Augusto 68'		85' Silva	Stadium: Estádio da Luz; Referee: Fernado Velez

3 January 1960 13	Belenenses	0–0	Benfica	Belém
				Stadium: Estádio do Restelo

10 January 1960 14	Vitória de Setúbal	2–3	Benfica	Setúbal
	Bira 4' (pen.); Mendonça 66'		51', 61' Cavém; 64' José Águas	Stadium: Campo dos Arcos

17 January 1960 15	Benfica	2–0	Braga	Lisbon
	José Águas 11'; Santana 26'			Stadium: Estádio da Luz

24 January 1960 16	Lusitano de Évora	2–3	Benfica	Évora
	Ivson 53'; Palmeiro 74'		4' Cavém; 33' Augusto; 43' José Águas	Referee: Inácio Teresa

7 February 1960 17	Benfica	9–0	Boavista	Lisbon
16:00	José Águas 10', 25', 30', 88'; Coluna 15', 67'; Santana 18'; Augusto 71'; Cavém 83'			Stadium: Estádio da Luz

14 February 1960 18	Benfica	4–1	Vitória de Guimarães	Lisbon
	Santana 35', 60'; Augusto 84'; Cavém 88'		70' Edmur	Stadium: Estádio da Luz

21 February 1960 19	Covilhã	1–4	Benfica	Covilhã
16:00	Suárez 61'		55' Santana; 67', 80' Augusto; 81' Coluna

6 March 1960 20	Benfica	2–1	Atlético	Lisbon
	Cavém 23'; Coluna 85'		66' Angeja	Stadium: Estádio da Luz

13 March 1960 21	CUF	1–5	Benfica	Barreiro
	Salvador 90'		54' Saraiva; 59' Cavém; 79' Augusto; 80' Águas; 87' Coluna	Stadium: Estádio Dr. Manuel de Mello; Referee: Clemente Henriques

20 March 1960 22	Benfica	5–1	Académica	Lisbon
	Augusto 7', 79'; Coluna 75'; Santana 80'; José Águas 82'		38' Miranda	Stadium: Estádio da Luz; Referee: Encarnação Salgado

3 April 1960 23	Porto	2–2	Benfica	Porto
	Roberto 86'; Humaitá 90'		11' Cavém; 85' Mário João	Stadium: Estádio das Antas; Referee: Braga Barros

10 April 1960 24	Benfica	4–3	Sporting	Lisbon
16:00	Augusto 1', 50'; Cavém 10'; José Águas 26'		19' Seminário; 81' Monteiro; 84' Soares	Stadium: Estádio da Luz; Referee: Clemente Henriques

15 May 1960 25	Leixões	1–2	Benfica	Matosinhos
	Oliveirinha 7'		5' Cavém; 12' Augusto	Stadium: Campo da Santana

29 May 1960 26	Benfica	1–2	Belenenses	Lisbon
	José Augusto 34'		43' Matateu; 63' Tonho	Stadium: Estádio da Luz

=== Taça de Portugal ===
==== First round ====
29 November 1959 First leg	Desportivo de Beja	0–8	Benfica	Beja
			7', 40' Cavém; 28', 41', 79' José Águas; 51' Santana; 73' Augusto; 77' Coluna	Stadium: Estádio Municipal José Frederico Ulrich; Referee: Marcos Lobato

27 December 1959 Second leg	Benfica	5–1 (13–1 agg.)	Desportivo de Beja	Lisbon
	José Águas 7', 55'; Mendes 20'; Augusto 52'; Coluna 71'		61' José Caraballo	Stadium: Estádio da Luz

==== Second round ====
31 January 1960 First leg	Oliveirense	2–3	Benfica	Oliveira de Azeméis
			10' Coluna; 26' Santana; 48' Cavém

1 March 1960 Second leg	Benfica	5–0 (8–2 agg.)	Oliveirense	Lisbon
	José Águas 8', 66'; Augusto 35'; Coluna 84'; Santana 85'			Stadium: Estádio da Luz; Referee: Manuel Fragata

==== Round of 16 ====
23 March 1960 First leg	Vianense	1–2	Benfica	Viana do Castelo
			17' Santana; 67' Mário João	Stadium: Estádio Dr. José de Matos; Referee: Porfírio Silva

24 April 1960 Second leg	Benfica	6–0 (8–1 agg.)	Vianense	Lisbon
	Santana 11', 42', 65'; José Águas 33', 44'; Neto 77' (pen.)			Stadium: Estádio da Luz; Referee: Inácio Tereso

==== Quarter-Finals ====
5 May 1960 First leg	Angrense	0–2	Benfica	Lisbon
			24' Augusto; 50' Cavém	Stadium: Estádio da Luz

12 June 1960 Second leg	Benfica	10–0 (12–0 agg.)	Angrense	Lisbon
	Augusto 14', 36' (pen.), 85'; Cavém 16'; Coluna 24', 72'; José Águas 35', 49', 71'; Santana 80'			Stadium: Estádio da Luz; Referee: Virgílio Baptista

==== Semi-Finals ====
19 June 1960 First leg	Sporting	3–0	Benfica	Lisbon
	Hugo Sarmento 55'; Diego Arizaga 73'; Juan Seminario 82'		(red card) Cruz	Stadium: Estádio José Alvalade; Referee: Francisco Guerra

25 June 1960 Second leg	Benfica	0–0 (0–3 agg.)	Sporting	Lisbon
				Stadium: Estádio da Luz; Referee: Caetano Nogueira

=== Friendlies ===
30 August 1959; Tribute to Arsénio Duarte	CUF	1–2	Benfica	Barreiro
				Stadium: Campo Santa Bárbara

1 September 1959	Benfica	1–0	Real Oviedo	Lisbon
				Stadium: Estádio da Luz

6 September 1959; Taça de Honra; Semi-final	Beleneneses	1–0	Benfica	Lisbon
	Yaúca 56'			Stadium: Estádio Nacional

13 September 1959 Taça de Honra; 3rd/4th place	Benfica	1–0	Atlético	Lisbon
	José Águas 1'			Stadium: Estádio Nacional; Referee: Fernando Martins

1 October 1959	Benfica	2–1	TJ Rudá hvězda Brno	Lisbon
	Cavém			Stadium: Estádio da Luz

16 June 1960; National Champions' Celebration	Benfica	1–0	Monaco	Lisbon
	Joaquim Santana			Stadium: Estádio da Luz

== Player statistics ==
The squad for the season consisted of the players listed in the tables below, as well as staff member Béla Guttman (manager), Fernando Cabrita (assistant manager).

Note 1: Note: Flags indicate national team as defined under FIFA eligibility rules. Players may hold more than one non-FIFA nationality.

Note 2: Players with squad numbers marked ‡ joined the club during the 1959-60 season via transfer, with more details in the following section.

No.	Pos	Nat	Player	Total		Primeira Divisão		Taça de Portugal	
No.	Pos	Nat	Player	Apps	Goals	Apps	Goals	Apps	Goals
1	GK	(Portugal) POR	Costa Pereira	34	0	24	0	10	0
1	GK	(Portugal) POR	José Barroca	4	0	3	0	1	0
	DF	(Portugal) POR	Zézinho	1	0	1	0	0	0
2	DF	(Portugal) POR	Ângelo Martins	13	0	7	0	6	0
2	DF	(Portugal) POR	Manuel Serra	25	0	21	0	4	0
3	DF	(Portugal) POR	Artur Santos	35	0	25	0	10	0
4	DF	(Portugal) POR	Mário João	34	1	24	1	10	0
	MF	(Portugal) POR	Álvaro Inácio	1	0	0	0	1	0
	MF	(Portugal) POR	Alfredo Abrantes	1	0	1	0	0	0
5	MF	(Portugal) POR	António Saraiva	14	1	10	1	4	0
5	MF	(Portugal) POR	José Neto	28	1	21	0	7	1
6	MF	(Portugal) POR	Fernando Cruz	28	0	20	0	8	0
	FW	(Portugal) POR	António Mendes	3	1	1	0	2	1
	FW	(Portugal) POR	Flávio	0	0	0	0	0	0
7	FW	(Portugal) POR	Francisco Palmeiro	6	1	4	1	2	0
7	FW	(Portugal) POR	José Augusto	34	26	25	19	9	7
8	FW	(Portugal) POR	Santana	33	18	24	10	9	8
9	FW	(Portugal) POR	José Águas	33	30	25	18	8	12
9	FW	(Portugal) POR	José Torres	3	2	2	2	1	0
10	FW	(Portugal) POR	Coluna	33	16	23	10	10	6
11	FW	(Portugal) POR	Domiciano Cavém	35	18	26	13	9	5

== Transfers ==
=== In ===
Position	Player	From	Fee	Ref
MF	Álvaro Inácio	Atlético CP	Undisclosed	
MF	António Saraiva	Caldas S.C.	Undisclosed	
FW	José Augusto	F.C. Barreirense	Undisclosed	
FW	José Torres	CD Torres Novas	Undisclosed	

=== Out ===
Position	Player	To	Fee	Ref
DF	Humberto Fernandes	Torreense	Undisclosed	
DF	Nuno	Torreense	Undisclosed	
FW	Macedo	AD Sanjoanense	Undisclosed	
DF	Fernando Ferreira	Atlético CP	Undisclosed	
FW	Chino	Marinhense	Undisclosed	
