= 1968–69 S.L. Benfica season =

Benfica
1968–69 season
- President: Adolfo Vieira de Brito (until 12 April 1969); Duarte Borges Coutinho
- Head coach: Otto Glória
- Stadium: Estádio da Luz
- Primeira Divisão: 1st
- Taça de Portugal: Winners
- European Cup: Quarter-finals
- Top goalscorer: League: Torres (16); All: Eusébio (29)
- Biggest win: Benfica 8–0 União Almeirim (9 February 1969)
- Biggest defeat: CUF 3–0 Benfica (24 November 1968); Ajax 3–0 Benfica (5 March 1969)
| Home colours | Away colours |

The 1968–69 season was Sport Lisboa e Benfica's 65th season in existence and the club's 35th consecutive season in the top flight of Portuguese football, covering the period from 1 August 1968 to 31 July 1969. Domestically, Benfica competed in the Primeira Divisão and Taça de Portugal, while internationally participated in the European Cup.

Several new players, including Humberto Coelho and Nené, joined Benfica as Otto Glória continued his second spell as manager. The team secured its 17th league title, and completed the domestic double by winning the Taça de Portugal after defeating Académica 2–1 in the final. In Europe, Benfica eliminated Valur and defeated Ajax away, but were eliminated by the Dutch side after a play-off in Paris, in what was later regarded as a symbolic turning point in continental football.

== Season summary ==
After a difficult season that nevertheless ended with Benfica retaining the league title, the board decided to keep Otto Glória as coach for another year. Humberto Coelho, Zeca, Toni, Vítor Martins, Nené, Abel Miglietti and Praia joined the squad, while Nélson Fernandes, Santana and Iaúca departed.

Pre-season began with a tour of South America, where Benfica drew 1–1 with Clube do Remo, 1–1 with Boca Juniors, lost 4–2 to Santos, drew 3–3 with River Plate, lost 2–1 to Nacional, lost 2–0 to Botafogo, drew 2–2 with Independiente Santa Fe, and finished with a 3–3 draw against Santos.

While the first team was on tour, the reserves won 2–1 against Belenenses in the semi-final of the Taça de Honra, before defeating Sporting 3–0 in the final.

The official season opened on 8 September with a 4–1 home win over Belenenses in the first league match. In the following three rounds, Benfica defeated Braga, Vitória de Setúbal and Leixões, before a 1–1 draw away to Varzim, finishing October one point clear at the top of the table. In Europe, Benfica eliminated Valur 8–1 on aggregate, with all goals scored in the second leg at home.

November began with a 4–3 home win over Atlético, followed by two goalless draws—against Sporting away and Vitória de Guimarães at home—and a 2–0 away loss to CUF. In December, Benfica defeated Académica 3–2 at home, lost 1–0 away to Porto, and closed the year with victories over Belenenses and União de Tomar, finishing 1968 level on 21 points with Porto.

The new year began with a 5–0 win over Braga, a 1–1 draw in Setúbal and a 5–0 victory against Sanjoanense. In February, Benfica drew 0–0 away to Leixões, defeated Varzim 3–1 at home and Atlético 2–0 away, finishing the month in first place with a two-point lead. Also that month, Benfica eliminated União Almeirim 8–0 in the first round of the Taça de Portugal, won 3–1 away against Ajax in Amsterdam, but lost 3–1 at home in the second leg, forcing a play-off.

March opened with a 0–0 home draw against Sporting, followed by a 3–0 victory over Porto in the second round of the Taça de Portugal, a 2–0 away loss to Vitória de Guimarães, a 1–0 win over CUF and a 2–0 away win against Académica, ending the month level on points with Porto.

Between the Sporting and Porto fixtures, the decisive play-off with Ajax was held at the Parc des Princes in Paris. After a goalless 90 minutes, Ajax scored three times in extra-time to eliminate Benfica in the quarter-finals. The match is often described as a symbolic “passing of the torch”: Benfica, one of the dominant forces in European football during the 1960s—twice European Cup winners and five-time finalists—were seen as yielding the stage to the rising Ajax side that would shape the following decade.

In April, Benfica drew 0–0 at home with Porto and won 4–0 away against União de Tomar, securing the league title. The team progressed to the Taça de Portugal final by eliminating Atlético de Luanda 7–2 on aggregate, Belenenses 3–2 in the quarter-finals and CUF 7–3 in the semi-finals.

On 22 June, Benfica faced Académica in the Taça de Portugal final. The match was marked by protests from Académica supporters, many of them university students opposing the regime, joined by Benfica supporters. Benfica won 2–1 after extra-time with a goal from Eusébio, while the day also became remembered for the broader student movement that emerged from the protest.

== Competitions ==
Win Draw Loss Postponed

=== Overall record ===
| Competition | First match | Last match | Record | | | | | | | | |
| Competition | First match | Last match | G | W | D | L | GF | GA | GD | Win % | Source |
|---|---|---|---|---|---|---|---|---|---|---|---|
| Primeira Divisão | 8 September 1968 | 27 April 1969 | 26 | 16 | 7 | 3 | 49 | 17 | +32 | 61.54 | |
| Taça de Portugal | 9 February 1969 | 22 June 1969 | 9 | 7 | 2 | 0 | 30 | 8 | +22 | 77.78 | |
| European Cup | 18 September 1968 | 5 March 1969 | 5 | 2 | 1 | 2 | 12 | 8 | +4 | 40.00 | |
| Total | | | 40 | 25 | 10 | 5 | 91 | 33 | +58 | 62.50 | |

== League standings ==
| Pos | Team | Pld | W | D | L | GF | GA | GD | Pts | Qualification or relegation |
|---|---|---|---|---|---|---|---|---|---|---|
| 1 | Benfica (C) | 26 | 16 | 7 | 3 | 49 | 17 | +32 | 39 | Qualification to European Cup first round |
| 2 | Porto | 26 | 15 | 7 | 4 | 39 | 23 | +16 | 37 | Qualification to Inter-Cities Fairs Cup first round |
| 3 | Vitória de Guimarães | 26 | 13 | 10 | 3 | 46 | 17 | +29 | 36 | Qualification to Inter-Cities Fairs Cup first round |
| 4 | Vitória de Setúbal | 26 | 13 | 9 | 4 | 45 | 20 | +25 | 35 | Qualification to Inter-Cities Fairs Cup first round |
| 5 | Sporting CP | 26 | 11 | 8 | 7 | 35 | 20 | +15 | 30 | Qualification to Inter-Cities Fairs Cup first round |

Source: RSSSF
(C) Champions

=== Matches ===
| 8 September 1968 1 | Benfica | 4–1 | Belenenses | Lisbon |
| | Torres 5'; Eusébio 12' (penalty), 70'; Jacinto 44' | | Manuel Rodrigues 16' (penalty) | Stadium: Estádio da Luz; Referee: Marcos Lobato |

| 15 September 1968 2 | Braga | 0–1 | Benfica | Braga |
| | | | Juvenal 55' (o.g.) | Stadium: Estádio 28 de Maio; Referee: Fernando Leite |

| 22 September 1968 3 | Benfica | 2–1 | Vitória de Setúbal | Lisbon |
| | Torres 12', 41' | | Ernesto de Figueiredo 8' | Stadium: Estádio da Luz; Referee: Manuel Fortunato |

| 29 September 1968 4 | Sanjoanense | 0–1 | Benfica |
| | | | Jacinto 16' (penalty) |

| 6 October 1968 5 | Benfica | 4–0 | Leixões | Lisbon |
| | Torres 20', 52'; Augusto 61', 79' | | | Stadium: Estádio da Luz |

| 13 October 1968 6 | Varzim | 1–1 | Benfica | Póvoa do Varzim |
| | Camolas 77' | | Jaime Graça 60' | Stadium: Estádio do Varzim Sport Club; Referee: Henrique Costa |

| 3 November 1968 7 | Benfica | 4–3 | Atlético | Lisbon |
| | Augusto 2'; Torres 13'; Coluna 16', 60' | | Tito 30', 86'; Raimundo 67' | Stadium: Estádio da Luz; Referee: Ilídio Cacho |

| 10 November 1968 8 | Sporting | 0–0 | Benfica | Lisbon |
| | | | | Stadium: Estádio José Alvalade; Referee: Caetano Nogueira |

| 17 November 1968 9 | Benfica | 0–0 | Vitória de Guimarães | Lisbon |
| | | | | Stadium: Estádio da Luz; Referee: Mário Alves |

| 24 November 1968 10 | CUF | 3–0 | S.L. Benfica | Barreiro |
| | José Monteiro 16', 26', 48' | | | Stadium: Estádio Alfredo da Silva; Referee: Manuel Fortunato |

| 1 December 1968 11 | Benfica | 3–2 | Académica | Lisbon |
| | Torres 19'; Praia 74', 90' | | | Stadium: Estádio da Luz |

| 15 December 1968 12 | Porto | 1–0 | Benfica | Porto |
| | Custódio Pinto 15' | | | Stadium: Estádio das Antas; Referee: Saldanha Ribeiro |

| 22 December 1968 13 | Benfica | 4–0 | União de Tomar | Lisbon |
| | Torres 20', 25', 71'; Jaime Graça 38' | | | Stadium: Estádio da Luz |

| 29 December 1968 14 | Belenenses | 1–2 | Benfica | Belém |
| | Valter Ferreira 20' | | Jaime Graça 10'; Torres 61' | Stadium: Estádio do Restelo |

| 5 January 1969 15 | Benfica | 5–0 | Braga | Lisbon |
| | Torres 15', 48', 55'; Eusébio 30'; Jaime Graça 57' | | | Stadium: Estádio da Luz |

| 19 January 1969 16 | Vitória de Setúbal | 1–1 | Benfica | Setúbal |
| | José Maria 1' | | Coluna 3' |

| 26 January 1969 17 | Benfica | 5–0 | Sanjoanense | Lisbon |
| | Torres 12', 26'; Jaime Graça 37'; Toni 62'; Eusébio 72' | | | Stadium: Estádio da Luz |

| 2 February 1969 18 | Benfica | 0–0 | Leixões | Matosinhos |

| 16 February 1969 19 | Benfica | 3–1 | Varzim | Lisbon |
| | Jaime Graça 11'; Augusto 33'; Simões 51' | | Nélson Fernandes 44' | Stadium: Estádio da Luz |

| 23 February 1969 20 | Atlético | 0–2 | Benfica | Lisbon |
| | | | Eusébio 42', 86' |

| 2 March 1969 21 | Sporting | 0–0 | Benfica | Lisbon |
| | | | | Stadium: Estádio José Alvalade |

| 16 March 1969 22 | Vitória de Guimarães | 2–0 | Benfica | Guimarães |
| | Peres 64', 68' | | | Stadium: Estádio D. Afonso Henriques; Referee: Marcos Lobato |

| 23 April 1969 23 | Benfica | 1–0 | CUF | Lisbon |
| | Eusébio 13' | | | Stadium: Estádio da Luz |

| 30 March 1969 24 | Académica | 0–2 | Benfica | Coimbra |
| | | | Eusébio 69' (84) |

| 20 April 1969 25 | Benfica | 0–0 | Porto | Lisbon |
| | | | | Stadium: Estádio da Luz; Referee: Manuel Fortunato |

| 27 April 1969 26 | Uniao de Tomar | 0–4 | Benfica | Tomar |
| | Eusébio 6'; Augusto 26'; Simões 39'; Faustino Luís 64' (o.g.) | | | Stadium: Estádio José Frederico Ulrich; Referee: Mário Alves |

=== Taça de Portugal ===
==== First round ====
| 2 September 1968 | Benfica | 8–0 | Almeirim | Lisbon |
| | Simões 2'; Abel Miglietti 15', 82'; Eusébio 17', 31', 42'; Augusto 33'; Jacinto 62' | | | Stadium: Estádio da Luz |

==== Second round ====
| 9 March 1969 | Benfica | 3–0 | Porto | Lisbon |
| | João Atraca 6' (o.g.); Eusébio 9', 81' (penalty) | | | Stadium: Estádio da Luz; Referee: Francisco Lobo |

==== Third Round ====
| 10 May 1969; First leg | Atlético Luanda | 0–4 | Benfica | Luanda |
| | | | Eusébio 3', 52', 75'; Praia 89' | Stadium: Estádio dos Coqueiros; Referee: Hernâni Leite |

| 14 May 1968; Second leg | Benfica | 3–2 (7–2 agg.) | Atlético Luanda | Luanda |
| | Eusébio 21', 75'; Augusto 88' | | | Stadium: Estádio dos Coqueiros; Referee: Ismael Baltazar |

==== Quarter-Finals ====
| 25 May 1969; First leg | Belenenses | 0–1 | Benfica | Belém |
| | | | Eusébio 89' | Stadium: Estádio do Restelo; Referee: Mário Alves |

| 1 June 1968; Second leg | Benfica | 2–2 (3–2 agg.) | Belenenses | Lisbon |
| | Eusébio 30', 84' | | José Cardoso 45'; Roberto Saporiti 51' | Stadium: Estádio da Luz; Referee: Américo Barradas |

==== Semi-Finals ====
| 7 June 1969; First leg | Benfica | 5–1 | CUF | Lisbon |
| | Eusébio 7', 53', 61'; Torres 63', 87' | | José Monteiro 55' | Stadium: Estádio da Luz; Referee: João Calado |

| 15 June 1969; Second leg | CUF | 2–2 (3–7 agg.) | Benfica | Barreiro |
| | Capitão Mor 34' | | Toni 64'; Eusébio 66' | Stadium: Estádio Alfredo da Silva |

==== Final ====
| 22 June 1969 | Benfica | 2–1 (a.e.t.) | Académica | Oeiras |
| | Simões 85'; Eusébio 109' | | Manuel António 81' | Stadium: Estádio do Jamor; Referee: Ismael Baltazar |

=== First Round ===
| 18 September 1968; First leg | Valur (Iceland) | 0–0 | (Portugal) Benfica | Laugardalsvöllur, Reykjavík |
| | | Report | | Attendance: 18,243; Referee: Patrick Graham (Republic of Ireland) |

| 2 October 1968; Second leg | Benfica (Portugal) | 8–1 (8–1 agg.) | (Iceland) Valur | Estádio da Luz, Lisbon |
| | Simões 4'; Jacinto 7'; Torres 11', 47', 79'; Eusébio 20'; Coluna 27'; José Augusto 48' | Report | Gunnarsson 68' | Attendance: 24,389; Referee: Joseph Cassar-Naudi (Malta) |

=== Second Round ===
Benfica got a second round bye.

=== Quarter-Finals ===
| 12 February 1969; First leg | Ajax (Netherlands) | 1–3 | (Portugal) Benfica | Olympisch Stadion, Amsterdam |
| | Danielsson 48' | Report | Santos 31' (pen.); Torres 36'; José Augusto 61' | Attendance: 55,150; Referee: Robert Holley Davidson (Scotland) |

| 19 February 1969; Second leg | Benfica (Portugal) | 1–3 | (Netherlands) Ajax | Estádio da Luz, Lisbon |
| | Torres 70' | Report | Danielsson 9'; Cruyff 12', 32' | Attendance: 31,019; Referee: Antonio Sbardella (Italy) |

| 5 March 1969 Play-off | Ajax (Netherlands) | 3–0 (a.e.t.) (7–4 agg.) | (Portugal) Benfica | Stade Olympique Yves-du-Manoir, Paris |
| | Cruyff 93'; Danielsson 105', 108' | Report | | Attendance: 63,638; Referee: Roger Mâchin (France) |

=== Friendlies ===
| 9 August 1968 | Clube do Remo | 1–1 | Benfica | Belém |
| | | | Torres | Stadium: Estádio Evandro Almeida |

| 11 August 1968 | Boca Juniors | 1–1 | Benfica | Buenos Aires |
| | | | Jacinto | Stadium: La Bombonera |

| 18 August 1968 | Benfica | 2–4 | Santos | Buenos Aires |
| | | | Toni; Jorge Calado | Stadium: La Bombonera |

| 20 August 1968 | River Plate | 3–3 | Benfica | Buenos Aires |
| | Onega 31', 52'; Vital 65' | | José Torres 26', 49'; Eusébio 54' | Stadium: La Bombonera |

| 22 August 1968 | Benfica | 1–2 | Nacional | Buenos Aires |
| | Jacinto 24' | | Mujica 27', 34' | Stadium: La Bombonera |

| 27 August 1968 | Benfica | 0–2 | Botafogo | Caracas |
| | | | | Stadium: Estádio Olímpico de la Universidad Central de Venezuela |

| 30 August 1968 | Independiente Santa Fe | 0–0 | Benfica | Bogotá |
| | | | | Stadium: Estadio Nemesio Camacho El Campín |

| 29 August 1968; Taça de Honra; Semi-Finals | Belenenses | 1–2 | Benfica | Belém |
| | Valter 33' | | Abel Miglietti 35', 58' | Stadium: Estádio do Restelo |

| 1 September 1968 | Benfica | 3–3 | Santos | New York |
| | | | Jacinto; Augusto; Eusébio | Stadium: Yankee Stadium |

| 4 September 1968; Taça de Honra; Finals | Benfica | 3–0 | Sporting | Belém |
| | Raúl Águas 22'; Pavão 59', 79' | | | Stadium: Estádio do Restelo |

| 12 March 1969 Tribute to Trappeniers, Cornelis and Van Himst | Anderlecht | 3–2 | Benfica | Brussels |
| | | | Jaime Graça; Torres | Stadium: Constant Vanden Stock Stadium |

| 6 April 1969; Beira-Rio inauguration | Internacional | 2–1 | Benfica | Porto Alegre |
| | | | Eusébio | Stadium: Estádio Beira-Rio |

| 8 April 1969; Beira-Rio inauguration | Grêmio | 2–1 | Benfica | Porto Alegre |
| | | | Eusébio | Stadium: Estádio Beira-Rio |

| 26 June 1969; Iberian Trophy; Semi-Finals | Benfica | 1–0 | Real Sociedad | Badajoz |
| | Torres 35' | | | Stadium: Estadio El Vivero |

| 28 June 1969; Iberian Trophy; Final | Benfica | 4–1 | Atlético Madrid | Badajoz |
| | Eusébio 3'; Eusébio 40'; Jaime Graça 45'; Simões 89' | | Adelardo 17' | Stadium: Estadio El Vivero |

== Player statistics ==
The squad for the season consisted of the players listed in the tables below, as well as staff member Otto Glória (manager), Fernando Cabrita (assistant manager).

Note 1: Note: Flags indicate national team as defined under FIFA eligibility rules. Players may hold more than one non-FIFA nationality.

Note 2: Players with squad numbers marked ‡ joined the club during the 1968–69 season via transfer, with more details in the following section.

| No. | Pos | Nat | Player | Total | | Primeira Divisão | | Taça de Portugal | | European Cup | |
| No. | Pos | Nat | Player | Apps | Goals | Apps | Goals | Apps | Goals | Apps | Goals |
|---|---|---|---|---|---|---|---|---|---|---|---|
| 1 | GK | (Portugal) POR | Alfredo Nascimento | 4 | 0 | 3 | 0 | 0 | 0 | 1 | 0 |
| 1 | GK | (Portugal) POR | José Henrique | 35 | 0 | 23 | 0 | 8 | 0 | 4 | 0 |
| 1 | GK | (Portugal) POR | Manuel Abrantes | 1 | 0 | 0 | 0 | 1 | 0 | 0 | 0 |
| | DF | (Portugal) POR | Jacinto | 32 | 4 | 22 | 2 | 5 | 1 | 5 | 1 |
| | DF | (Portugal) POR | Domiciano Cavém | 2 | 0 | 1 | 0 | 0 | 0 | 1 | 0 |
| 2 | DF | (Portugal) POR | Adolfo Calisto | 22 | 0 | 12 | 0 | 8 | 0 | 2 | 0 |
| 2 | DF | (Portugal) POR | Malta da Silva | 6 | 0 | 1 | 0 | 5 | 0 | 0 | 0 |
| 3 | DF | (Portugal) POR | Fernando Cruz | 29 | 0 | 22 | 0 | 2 | 0 | 5 | 0 |
| 3 | MF | (Portugal) POR | Humberto Fernandes | 5 | 0 | 2 | 0 | 1 | 0 | 2 | 0 |
| 3 | MF | (Portugal) POR | Humberto Coelho | 40 | 0 | 26 | 0 | 9 | 0 | 5 | 0 |
| 4 | DF | (Portugal) POR | Zeca | 12 | 0 | 5 | 0 | 7 | 0 | 0 | 0 |
| 5 | DF | (Portugal) POR | Raul Machado | 23 | 0 | 18 | 0 | 1 | 0 | 4 | 0 |
| | MF | (Portugal) POR | Praia | 17 | 3 | 14 | 2 | 3 | 1 | 0 | 0 |
| 6 | MF | (Portugal) POR | Jaime Pavão | 2 | 0 | 2 | 0 | 0 | 0 | 0 | 0 |
| 6 | MF | (Portugal) POR | Jaime Graça | 35 | 7 | 21 | 6 | 9 | 0 | 5 | 1 |
| 6 | MF | (Portugal) POR | Mário Coluna | 36 | 4 | 24 | 3 | 8 | 0 | 4 | 1 |
| 7 | FW | (Portugal) POR | José Augusto | 36 | 9 | 23 | 5 | 8 | 2 | 5 | 2 |
| 7 | FW | (Portugal) POR | Nené | 4 | 0 | 4 | 0 | 0 | 0 | 0 | 0 |
| 8 | MF | (Portugal) POR | Manuel José | 1 | 0 | 1 | 0 | 0 | 0 | 0 | 0 |
| 8 | MF | (Portugal) POR | Toni | 34 | 2 | 22 | 1 | 8 | 1 | 4 | 0 |
| 9 | MF | (Portugal) POR | Abel Miglietti | 9 | 2 | 5 | 0 | 4 | 2 | 0 | 0 |
| 9 | FW | (Portugal) POR | José Torres | 32 | 23 | 19 | 16 | 8 | 2 | 5 | 5 |
| 10 | FW | (Portugal) POR | Eusébio | 35 | 29 | 21 | 10 | 9 | 18 | 5 | 1 |
| 10 | MF | (Portugal) POR | Raul Águas | 4 | 0 | 4 | 0 | 0 | 0 | 0 | 0 |
| 11 | FW | (Portugal) POR | António Simões | 36 | 5 | 22 | 2 | 9 | 2 | 5 | 1 |
