= 1966–67 S.L. Benfica season =

Benfica
1966–67 season
- President: José Ferreira Queimado (until 3 July 1967); Adolfo Vieira de Brito
- Head coach: Fernando Riera
- Stadium: Estádio da Luz
- Primeira Divisão: 1st
- Taça de Portugal: Quarter-finals
- Fairs Cup: Third round
- Top goalscorer: League: Eusébio (31); All: Eusébio (42)
- Biggest win: Beira-Mar 0–9 Benfica (7 May 1967)
- Biggest defeat: Braga 4–0 Benfica (20 November 1966)
Home colours	Away colours

The 1966–67 season was Sport Lisboa e Benfica's 63st season in existence and the club's 33st consecutive season in the top flight of Portuguese football, covering the period from 1 August 1966 to 31 July 1967. Domestically, Benfica competed in the Primeira Divisão and Taça de Portugal, while internationally participated in the Inter-Cities Fairs Cup.

After finishing the season without silverware for the first time in eight years, the Benfica board opted to bring back former manager Fernando Riera. José Neto, José Pérides, Domingos Fernandes, Pedras and Serafim departed, while Adolfo Calisto, José Henrique, Jaime Graça and Diamantino Costa joined the squad. The league title race was closely contested with Académica, but Benfica ultimately secured its 15th league championship. In the Taça de Portugal Benfica was eliminated by Académica, while in Europe they exited in the third round against Lokomotive Leipzig.

== Season summary ==
After a trophyless campaign, the first in eight years, the board opted to bring back manager Fernando Riera. The squad underwent several changes: José Neto, José Pérides, Domingos Fernandes and Serafim departed, while Pedras, Arcanjo and Félix Guerreiro were included in a deal to bring Jaime Graça. Adolfo Calisto, José Henrique and Diamantino Costa also joined the club.

Pre-season began with participation in the Torneio Costa do Sol, where Benfica defeated Atlético Madrid 2–0 in the semi-finals before losing 2–1 to Tottenham Hotspur in the final. The team then embarked on a tour of the Americas, losing 4–0 to Santos in New York, defeating Club América 3–0 at the Estadio Azteca, drawing 2–2 with AEK in New York, and beating the Italian Falcons 1–0 in Toronto.

Later, a 3–2 victory over Atlético sent Benfica to the final of the Taça de Honra, where they defeated Sporting 2–0.

The official season began on 18 September with a 1–0 away win over Vitória de Guimarães in their first league match. In the following five rounds Benfica collected four wins and one draw, including a 3–0 home victory over Sporting, ending October with a three-point lead.

In the Fairs Cup they faced Spartak Plovdiv, drawing 1–1 away and winning 3–0 at home. In the Taça de Portugal a 9–0 aggregate victory secured progression to the next round. In the league Benfica played only two matches in November, losing 4–0 away to Braga and defeating Porto 3–0 at home, maintaining a two-point advantage. In December, three wins over Sanjoanense, CUF and Vitória de Setúbal kept Benfica top of the table with a two-point lead, while in Europe they suffered a 3–1 defeat to Lokomotive Leipzig in the first leg.

On 5 December, defender Luciano died after being electrocuted in a hot tub in the team's locker room due to an electrical malfunction.

Benfica began the new year with a 2–1 away defeat to Belenenses, followed by a 2–0 win over Beira-Mar and an 11–1 aggregate victory against Lusitano de Évora in the Taça de Portugal. In February, Benfica won its first three league matches before ending the month with a 1–1 draw against Sporting, finishing level on points with Académica.

In March, Benfica won all four of its league fixtures: 2–0 against Atlético, 1–0 away against Académica, 4–0 against Braga (avenging the earlier away loss), and 2–1 over Lokomotive Leipzig. The team ended the month with a four-point lead but was eliminated from European competitions.

April opened with a 1–1 away draw against Porto, followed by two victories over Sanjoanense and CUF. A defeat in Setúbal was offset by further wins against Belenenses and Beira-Mar, securing Benfica's 15th league title. The season concluded with a 4–3 elimination in the Taça de Portugal quarter-finals against Académica.

== Competitions ==
Win Draw Loss Postponed

=== Overall record ===
Competition	First match	Last match	Record								
Competition	First match	Last match	G	W	D	L	GF	GA	GD	Win %	Source
Primeira Divisão	18 September 1966	7 May 1967	26	20	3	3	64	19	+45	76.92	
Taça de Portugal	30 October 1966	18 June 1967	6	5	0	1	22	4	+18	83.33	
Inter-Cities Fairs Cup	26 October 1966	7 March 1967	4	2	1	1	7	5	+2	50.00	
Total			36	27	4	5	93	28	+65	75.00	

== League standings ==
Pos	Team	Pld	W	D	L	GF	GA	GD	Pts	Qualification or relegation
1	Benfica (C)	26	20	3	3	64	19	+45	43	Qualification to European Cup first round
2	Académica	26	18	4	4	50	18	+32	40	
3	Porto	26	17	5	4	56	22	+34	39	Qualification to Inter-Cities Fairs Cup first round
4	Sporting CP	26	11	8	7	36	24	+12	30	Qualification to Inter-Cities Fairs Cup first round
5	Vitória de Setúbal	26	10	7	9	27	25	+2	27	Qualification to Cup Winners' Cup first round

Source: RSSSF
(C) Champions

=== Results by round ===
==== Matches ====
18 September 1966 1	Vitória de Guimarães	0–1	Benfica	Guimarães
	Eusébio 42'			Stadium: Estádio D. Afonso Henriques; Referee: Pinto Ferreira

25 September 1966 2	Benfica	3–1	Leixões	Lisbon
	Simões 14'; Eusébio 15' (penalty), 85'		Arnaldo 70'	Stadium: Estádio da Luz; Referee: Encarnação Salgado

2 October 1966 3	Varzim	0–0	Benfica	Póvoa do Varzim
				Stadium: Estádio do Varzim SC; Referee: António Amaro

9 October 1966 4	Benfica	3–0	Sporting	Lisbon
	Eusébio 16', 35' (penalty); Torres 41'			Stadium: Estádio da Luz; Referee: Aníbal Oliveira

16 October 1966 5	Atlético	1–2	Benfica	Lisbon
	Matateu 82'		Eusébio 18', 42' (penalty)	Stadium: Estádio da Tapadinha; Referee: Salvador Garcia

23 October 1966 6	Benfica	2–1	Académica	Lisbon
	Celestino Martins 2' (o.g.); Augusto 86'		Artur Jorge 12'	Stadium: Estádio da Luz; Referee: Manuel Fortunato

20 November 1966 7	Braga	4–0	Benfica	Braga
	Adão Craveiro 15', 48'; Miguel Perrichon 58', 60'			Stadium: Estádio 28 de Maio; Referee: Caetano Nogueira

27 November 1966 8	Benfica	3–0	Porto	Lisbon
	Eusébio 11', 64'; Augusto 59'			Stadium: Estádio da Luz; Referee: Samuel de Abreu

4 December 1966 9	Sanjoanense	1–3	Benfica	São João da Madeira
	Valter Ferreira 67'		Eusébio 10', 20'; Simões 87'	Stadium: Estádio Conde Dias Garcia; Referee: Aniceto Nogueira

11 December 1966 10	Benfica	3–0	CUF	Lisbon
	Eusébio 2', 65' (penalty); Yaúca 43'			Stadium: Estádio da Luz; Referee: João Pinto Ferreira

18 December 1966 11	Benfica	1–0	Vitóra de Setúbal	Lisbon
	Augusto 1'			Stadium: Estádio da Luz; Referee: Braga Barros

1 January 1967 12	Belenenses	2–1	Benfica	Belém
	Carlos Pedro 27', 40' (penalty)		Coluna 80'	Stadium: Estádio do Restelo; Referee: Mário Mendonça

8 January 1967 13	Benfica	2–0	Beira-Mar	Lisbon
	Eusébio 39' (penalty); Augusto 62'			Stadium: Estádio da Luz

6 February 1967 14	Benfica	7–0	Vitória de Guimarães	Lisbon
	Jaime Graça 1'; Augusto 17', 55', 60'; Torres 26', 67', 75'			Stadium: Estádio da Luz

12 February 1967 15	Leixões	1–2	Benfica	Matosinhos
	Esteves 86'		Torres 2', 58'

19 February 1967 16	Benfica	6–2	Varzim	Lisbon
	Torres 2', 26'; Yaúca 14'; Eusébio 22' (penalty), 51', 78' (penalty)		Sidónio 59' (penalty); Jorge 74'	Stadium: Estádio da Luz

26 February 1967 17	Sporting	1–1	Benfica	Lisbon
	Gonçalves 50'		Eusébio 14'	Stadium: Estádio José Alvalade; Referee: Mário Mendonça

3 March 1967 18	Benfica	2–0	Atlético	Lisbon
	Coluna 33'; Eusébio 75' (penalty)			Stadium: Estádio da Luz; Referee: Joaquim Campos

12 March 1967 19	Académica	0–1	Benfica	Coimbra
			Nélson Fernandes 53'	Stadium: Estádio Cidade de Coimbra; Attendance: 43,000

19 March 1967 20	Benfica	4–0	Braga	Lisbon
	Eusébio 32' (penalty), 59', 83', 85'			Stadium: Estádio da Luz

2 April 1967 21	Porto	1–1	Benfica	Porto
	Manuel António 56'		Augusto 12'	Stadium: Estádio das Antas; Referee: Manuel Fortunato

9 April 1967 22	Benfica	1–0	Sanjoanense	Lisbon
	Eusébio 14'			Stadium: Estádio da Luz

16 April 1967 23	CUF	1–2	Benfica	Barreiro
			Nélson Fernandes 3'; Eusébio 86'	Stadium: Campo de Santa Bárbara; Referee: João Pinto Ferreira

23 April 1967 24	Vitória de Setúbal	3–2	Benfica	Setúbal
	José Maria 50', 51'; Fernando Tomé 69'		Eusébio 14' (penalty), 89' (penalty)	Stadium: Estádio Alfredo da Silva; Referee: Renato Santos

30 April 1967 25	Benfica	2–0	Belenenses	Lisbon
	Eusébio 44' (penalty); Augusto 73'			Stadium: Estádio da Luz; Referee: Braga Barros

7 May 1967 26	Beira-Mar	0–9	Benfica	Aveiro
			Raúl Machado 5'; Eusébio 10', 35' (penalty), 61'; Nélson Fernandes 33', 43', 68'; Simões 46'; Yaúca 89'	Stadium: Estádio Mário Duarte; Referee: Mário Mendonça

=== Taça de Portugal ===
==== First round ====
30 October 1966; First leg	Ovarense	0–6	Benfica	Ovar
			Santana 41'; Raúl Machado 64'; Torres 67', 70'; Simões 75'; Jaime Graça 85'	Stadium: Estádio Marques da Silva; Referee: Saldanha Ribeiro

3 November 1966; Second leg	Benfica	3–0 (9–0 agg.)	Ovarense	Lisbon
	Augusto Silva 6'; Diamantino Costa 25'; Amaro Vieira 61'			Stadium: Estádio da Luz; Referee: Virgílio Baptista

==== Second round ====
15 January 1967; First leg	Lusitano de Évora	1–3	Benfica	Évora
	António Louro 46'		Eusébio 2'; Yaúca 28'; Augusto 81'	Stadium: Campo Estrela; Referee: Marcos Lobato

18 January 1967; Second leg	Benfica	8–0 (11–1 agg.)	Lusitano de Évora	Lisbon
	Torres 13', 66'; Eusébio 29', 47', 52', 64', 83'; Augusto 40'			Stadium: Estádio da Luz; Referee: Virgílio Baptista

==== Quarter-Finals ====
11 June 1967; First leg	Académica	2–0	Benfica	Coimbra
	Ernesto 36', 88'			Stadium: Estádio Municipal de Coimbra; Referee: João Pinto Ferreira

18 June 1967; Second leg	Benfica	2–1 (3–4 agg.)	Académica	Lisbon
	Eusébio 33'; Jorge Calado 53'		Serafim	Stadium: Estádio da Luz; Referee: Marcos Lobato

=== Inter-Cities Fairs Cup ===
==== Second round ====
26 October 1966; First leg	FC Spartak Plovdiv (Bulgaria)	1–1	(Portugal) Benfica	Stadion 9-ti Septemvri, Plovdiv
	Dishkov 30'		Eusébio 4'	Attendance: 30,000; Referee: Alojz Obtulovič (Czechoslovakia)

22 November 1966; Second leg	(Portugal) Benfica	3–0 (4–1 agg.)	FC Spartak Plovdiv (Bulgaria)	Estádio da Luz, Lisbon
	Eusébio 53'; Torres 55'; Dimov 76' (o.g.)			Attendance: 14,200; Referee: John Paterson (Scotland)

==== Third Round ====
21 December 1966; First leg	Lokomotive Leipzig (East Germany)	3–1	(Portugal) Benfica	Zentralstadion, Leipzig
	Santos 25' (o.g.); Frenzel 47', 51'		José Augusto 40'	Attendance: 68,000; Referee: Kevin Howley (England)

7 March 1967; Second leg	(Portugal) Benfica	2–1 (3–4 agg.)	Lokomotive Leipzig (East Germany)	Estádio da Luz, Lisbon
	Eusébio 65' (pen.), 88'		Frenzel 81'	Attendance: 50,000; Referee: William Syme (Scotland)

=== Friendlies ===
14 August 1966; Torneio Costa do Sol; Semi-Finals	Benfica	2–0	Atlético Madrid	Málaga
	Eusébio			Stadium: Estadio La Rosaleda

16 August 1966; Torneio Costa do Sol; Final	Benfica	1–2	Tottenham	Málaga
	Eusébio 28'		Graves 14'; Robertson 65'	Stadium: Estadio La Rosaleda

21 August 1966	Benfica	0–4	Santos	New York
				Stadium: Downing Stadium; Attendance: 25,671; Referee: John Di Salvatore

23 August 1966	Club América	0–3	Benfica	Mexico City
			Eusébio; Simões	Stadium: Estadio Azteca

28 August 1966 New York Champions Cup	Benfica	2–2	AEK Athens	New York
08:00 WET	Eusébio 32'; Santana 59'	Report	Papaioannou 80', 85'	Stadium: Downing Stadium; Attendance: 15,000; Referee: Joe Karannade (United States)
Note: The match was permanently abandoned when a crowd of Greek expatriates invaded the pitch after AEK equalized the score.

30 August 1966	Italian Falcons	0–1	Benfica	Toronto
				Stadium: Varsity Stadium

7 September 1966; Taça de Honra; Semi-Finals	Benfica	3–2	Atlético	Belém
	Diamantino Costa 8'; Diamantino Costa 29'; Baptista 51'		Cravo 58'; Marinho 80'	Stadium: Estádio do Restelo

14 September 1966; Taça de Honra; Finals	Benfica	2–0	Sporting	Belém
	Amaro Vieira; Nélson Fernandes			Stadium: Estádio do Restelo

12 October 1966	Barcelona	1–1	Benfica	Barcelona
			Eusébio	Stadium: Camp Nou

19 October 1966	Benfica	1–0	Barcelona	Lisbon
	Augusto			Stadium: Estádio da Luz (1954)

6 November 1966	Belgrade Selection	1–2	Benfica	Bagdad
	Albert 53'		Torres 35'; Simões 81'	Stadium: Al-Shaab Stadium; Referee: El-Kaimabji

22 January 1967	Benfica	1–1	Sporting	Belém
				Stadium: Estádio do Restelo

25 January 1967	Universidad Católica	2–2	Benfica	Santiago
			Eusébio; Augusto	Stadium: Estádio Julio Martínez Prádanos

28 January 1967	Mixed Universidad Chile/Un.Católica	2–1	Benfica	Santiago
			Eusébio	Stadium: Estádio Julio Martínez Prádanos

12 May 1967	Universitario	2–2	Benfica	Lima
			José Augusto	Stadium: Estadio Nacional de Lima

17 May 1967	Benfica	3–1	Manchester United	Los Angeles
			Eusébio; Jorge Calado	Stadium: Memorial Coliseum

21 May 1967	Mexico	4–0	Benfica	Mexico City
				Stadium: Estadio Azteca

15 June 1967	Angers	0–1	Benfica	Paris
			Eusébio	Stadium: Parc des Princes

15 June 1967	Angrense	1–6	Benfica	Angra do Heroísmo
			Eusébio; Iaúca; Augusto; Nélson Fernandes	Stadium: Campo Municipal de Futebol de Angra do Heroísmo

== Player statistics ==
The squad for the season consisted of the players listed in the tables below, as well as staff member Fernando Riera (manager), Fernando Cabrita (assistant manager).

Note 1: Note: Flags indicate national team as defined under FIFA eligibility rules. Players may hold more than one non-FIFA nationality.

Note 2: Players with squad numbers marked ‡ joined the club during the 1966–67 season via transfer, with more details in the following section.

No.	Pos	Nat	Player	Total		Primeira Divisão		Taça de Portugal		Fairs Cup	
No.	Pos	Nat	Player	Apps	Goals	Apps	Goals	Apps	Goals	Apps	Goals
1	GK	(Portugal) POR	Costa Pereira	9	0	6	0	2	0	1	0
1	GK	(Portugal) POR	Alfredo Nascimento	24	0	20	0	1	0	3	0
1	GK	(Portugal) POR	José Henrique	2	0	0	0	2	0	0	0
1	GK	(Portugal) POR	José Melo	1	0	0	0	1	0	0	0
1	GK	(Angola) ANG	Manuel Abrantes	1	0	0	0	1	0	0	0
	DF	(Portugal) POR	Adolfo Calisto	2	0	0	0	2	0	0	0
	DF	(Portugal) POR	Augusto Silva	5	1	2	0	1	1	2	0
	DF	(Portugal) POR	Fernando Severino	1	0	1	0	0	0	0	0
	DF	(Portugal) POR	Jacinto	29	0	23	0	2	0	4	0
	DF	(Portugal) POR	Luciano	5	0	5	0	0	0	0	0
	DF	(Portugal) POR	Malta da Silva	2	0	0	0	2	0	0	0
2	DF	(Portugal) POR	Domiciano Cavém	35	0	26	0	5	0	4	0
3	DF	(Portugal) POR	Germano	1	0	0	0	1	0	0	0
4	DF	(Portugal) POR	Raul Machado	31	2	24	1	3	1	4	0
5	DF	(Portugal) POR	Fernando Cruz	28	0	23	0	3	0	2	0
	MF	(Portugal) POR	António Paula	3	0	0	0	3	0	0	0
	MF	(Portugal) POR	Carmo Pais	1	0	0	0	1	0	0	0
	MF	(Portugal) POR	Diamantino Costa	3	1	2	1	1	0	0	0
6	MF	(Portugal) POR	José Ferreira Pinto	2	0	0	0	2	0	0	0
	MF	(Portugal) POR	Jorge Calado	10	1	6	0	2	1	2	0
	MF	(Portugal) POR	Nélson Fernandes	15	5	12	5	1	0	2	0
	MF	(Portugal) POR	Humberto Fernandes	2	0	1	0	1	0	0	0
	FW	(Portugal) POR	Amaro Vieira	1	1	1	1	0	0	0	0
	FW	(Portugal) POR	Camolas	2	0	1	0	1	0	0	0
6	MF	(Portugal) POR	Jaime Graça	31	2	24	1	4	1	3	0
7	FW	(Portugal) POR	José Augusto	31	12	23	9	4	2	4	1
8	MF	(Portugal) POR	Mário Coluna	23	2	19	2	2	0	2	0
8	FW	(Portugal) POR	Santana	4	1	2	0	2	1	0	0
9	FW	(Portugal) POR	José Torres	18	13	13	8	3	4	2	1
9	FW	(Portugal) POR	Yaúca	14	4	8	3	4	1	2	0
10	FW	(Portugal) POR	Eusébio	33	42	26	31	3	7	4	4
11	FW	(Portugal) POR	António Simões	28	4	22	3	4	1	2	0
