= List of S.L. Benfica seasons =

Evolution of Sport Lisboa e Benfica's league performances since 1938

Sport Lisboa e Benfica, commonly known as Benfica, is a Portuguese professional football team based in Lisbon. The club was formed in 1904 as Sport Lisboa and played its first competitive match on 4 November 1906, when it entered the inaugural edition of the Campeonato de Lisboa.

This page includes Benfica seasons in Portuguese football and UEFA competitions (plus the Latin Cup and the Inter-Cities Fairs Cup) from the first to the last completed season. Moreover, it details the team's achievements in major competitions, as well as the top goalscorers for each season.

== Key ==
Table headers

- Pos – Final position in the league classification
- Pld – Number of league matches played
- W – Number of league matches won
- D – Number of league matches drawn
- L – Number of league matches lost
- GF – Number of goals scored in league matches
- GA – Number of goals conceded in league matches
- Pts – Number of points at the end of the league

Divisions

- Regional – Lisbon regional championship

Results and rounds

- 1st or W – Champions or Winners
- 2nd or RU – Runners-up
- SF – Semi-finals
- QF – Quarter-finals
- R16, R32, R64 – Round of 16, 32, and 64
- 1R, 2R, 3R, 4R – First, second, third, and fourth round
- GS – (First) Group stage
- 3Q – Third qualifying round
- PR – Preliminary round
- KPO – Knockout phase play-offs

Top scorers

- Players whose name is in italics were also the regional championship or Primeira Liga top scorers.
- GS – Players who were also top scorers in Europe (European Golden Shoe).

== Seasons ==
As of match played 16 May 2026

Overview of List of S.L. Benfica seasons
Season	Division	Pld	W	D	L	GF	GA	Pts	Pos	Cup (Note: Before the establishment of the Primeira Liga as the primary national championship, in the 1938–39 season, the Taça de Portugal was called Campeonato de Portugal (English: Championship of Portugal).)	League Cup	Super Cup	Competition	Result	Competition	Result	Player(s)	Goals
Season	League									Cup	League Cup	Super Cup	European competitions		Other competitions		Top scorer(s) (Note: Includes goals scored in all competitions that season.)	
1904–05 (Note: With the name Sport Lisboa.)	—	—	—	—	—	—	—	—	—	—	—	—	—	—	—	—	—	—
1905–06	—	—	—	—	—	—	—	—	—	—	—	—	—	—	—	—	—	—
1906–07	Regional	6	3	0	3	5	6	6	2nd	—	—	—	—	—	—	—	—	—
1907–08 (Note: Sport Lisboa absorbed Grupo Sport Benfica, changing the name to Sport Lisboa e Benfica.)	Regional	10	5	0	5	13	16	10	3rd	—	—	—	—	—	—	—	Eduardo Corga	4
1908–09	Regional	10	7	1	2	27	12	15	2nd	—	—	—	—	—	—	—	António Meireles	6
1909–10	Regional	10	8	0	2	24	5	16	1st	—	—	—	—	—	—	—	—	—
1910–11	Regional	12	9	2	1	41	6	20	2nd	—	—	—	—	—	—	—	—	—
1911–12	Regional	6	6	0	0	21	4	12	1st	—	—	—	—	—	—	—	—	—
1912–13	Regional	8	7	1	0	22	4	15	1st	—	—	—	—	—	—	—	—	—
1913–14	Regional	10	9	1	0	41	4	19	1st	—	—	—	—	—	—	—	Álvaro Gaspar	14
1914–15	Regional	10	8	0	2	50	8	16	2nd	—	—	—	—	—	—	—	Herculano Santos	15
1915–16	Regional	8	7	1	0	16	4	15	1st	—	—	—	—	—	—	—	Francisco Pereira	6
1916–17	Regional	8	7	1	0	26	1	15	1st	—	—	—	—	—	—	—	—	—
1917–18	Regional	4	3	0	1	7	5	6	1st	—	—	—	—	—	—	—	Artur Augusto	2
1918–19	Regional	10	6	0	4	26	10	12	2nd (Note: Benfica had to play a two-legged final against Sporting CP as both finished the Regional at the top two positions with the same number of points. Benfica lost both legs, 1–0 at home (Campo de Benfica) and 2–1 away (Estádio do Campo Grande). Both final matches are included on the stats.)	—	—	—	—	—	—	—	Jesus Crespo	6
1919–20	Regional	9	6	2	1	26	8	14	1st	—	—	—	—	—	—	—	Artur Augusto	7
1920–21	Regional	10	4	2	4	16	14	10	4th (Note: Benfica had to play a match after the end of the first stage at the Campo de Benfica against Carcavelinhos to determine the second team of their group (there were two groups of four teams) to advance to the second stage as both finished the first stage of the Regional at the middle two positions with the same number of points. Benfica won 1–0. This match is included on the stats.)	—	—	—	—	—	—	—	Jesus Crespo	4
1921–22	Regional	6	3	0	3	11	10	6	2nd	—	—	—	—	—	—	—	—	—
1922–23	Regional	8	4	2	2	18	13	10	2nd	—	—	—	—	—	—	—	Jesus Crespo	3
1923–24	Regional	8	3	3	2	13	10	9	3rd	—	—	—	—	—	—	—	Jesus Crespo	5
1924–25	Regional	8	4	1	3	18	7	9	3rd	—	—	—	—	—	—	—	Hugo Leitão; Vítor Hugo	4
1925–26	Regional	14	6	4	4	40	27	16	5th	—	—	—	—	—	—	—	Jorge Tavares	11
1926–27	Regional	14	5	3	6	23	25	13	5th	SF	—	—	—	—	—	—	Américo Antunes	7
1927–28	Regional	15	10	3	2	40	17	23	2nd (Note: Benfica had to play a final match at an unknown ground against Sporting CP as both finished the Regional at the top two positions with the same number of points. Benfica lost 3–0. The final match is included on the stats.)	SF	—	—	—	—	—	—	Jorge Tavares	14
1928–29	Regional (Note: Starting this season, Regional wins became worth 3 points, ties became worth 2 points and defeats became worth 1 point; instead of the traditional 2/1/0 points. If a team failed to show up at any given match, that team would not get any point.)	14	8	5	1	45	20	35	2nd	R16	—	—	—	—	—	—	Vítor Silva	11
1929–30	Regional	14	10	1	3	40	15	35	2nd	W	—	—	—	—	—	—	Vítor Silva	14
1930–31	Regional	14	4	4	6	35	22	26	5th	W	—	—	—	—	—	—	Vítor Silva	14
1931–32	Regional	13	7	2	4	32	17	29	3rd	SF	—	—	—	—	—	—	Octávio Policarpo	14
1932–33	Regional	19	13	3	3	44	22	48	1st (Note: Benfica had to play a final match at the Stadium de Lisboa against Belenenses as both finished the Regional at the top two positions with the same number of points. Benfica won 2–1. The final match is included on the stats.)	QF	—	—	—	—	—	—	Vítor Silva	17
1933–34	Regional	9	5	2	2	18	10	21	5th	SF	—	—	—	—	—	—	Carlos Torres	7
1934–35	Primeira Liga Regional	14 12	8 8	3 0	3 4	41 27	23 13	19 28	3rd 2nd (Note: Benfica had to play a final round-robin tournament against Sporting CP and Belenenses as all three finished the Regional at the top three positions with the same number of points. Sporting won both matches and Belenenses lost both, leaving Benfica at the second place. Both Benfica matches are included on the stats.)	W	—	—	—	—	—	—	Alfredo Valadas	23
1935–36	Primeira Liga Regional	14 11	8 8	5 0	1 3	44 34	23 16	21 27	1st 2nd (Note: Benfica had to play a final match at the Campo das Salésias against Sporting CP as both finished the Regional at the top two positions with the same number of points. Benfica lost 4–1. The final match is included on the stats.)	SF	—	—	—	—	—	—	Alfredo Valadas	24
1936–37	Primeira Liga Regional	14 10	12 5	0 3	2 2	57 26	13 14	24 23	1st 2nd	SF	—	—	—	—	—	—	Rogério de Sousa	32
1937–38	Primeira Liga Regional	14 10	10 7	3 2	1 1	34 42	16 14	23 26	1st 2nd	RU	—	—	—	—	—	—	Espírito Santo	35
1938–39	Primeira Divisão (Note: After four experimental editions, the Primeira Liga was officially established as a national league competition with the purpose of determining the national champions, thus replacing the Campeonato de Portugal, which was converted into the Taça de Portugal, the top domestic cup competition.) Regional	14 10	9 5	3 1	2 4	44 23	24 28	21 21	3rd 3rd	RU	—	—	—	—	—	—	Espírito Santo	23
1939–40	Primeira Divisão Regional	18 10	11 7	1 3	6 0	58 36	34 13	23 27	4th 1st	W	—	—	—	—	—	—	Francisco Rodrigues	44
1940–41	Primeira Divisão Regional	14 10	8 8	2 0	4 2	39 29	28 21	18 26	4th 2nd	SF	—	—	—	—	—	—	Francisco Rodrigues	30
1941–42	Primeira Divisão Regional	22 10	19 7	0 1	3 2	74 39	34 16	38 25	1st 2nd	QF	—	—	—	—	—	—	Francisco Rodrigues	25
1942–43	Primeira Divisão Regional	18 10	15 7	0 1	3 2	74 41	38 16	30 25	1st 2nd	W	—	—	—	—	—	—	Julinho	37
1943–44	Primeira Divisão Regional	18 10	11 7	4 2	3 1	57 39	34 21	26 26	2nd 2nd	W	—	—	—	—	—	—	Julinho	31
1944–45	Primeira Divisão Regional	18 10	14 7	2 0	2 3	79 41	26 18	30 24	1st 2nd	SF	—	—	—	—	—	—	Joaquim Teixeira	37
1945–46	Primeira Divisão Regional	22 10	17 4	3 2	2 4	82 17	29 21	37 20	2nd 4th	QF	—	—	—	—	—	—	Rogério Pipi	23
1946–47	Primeira Divisão Regional	26 10	20 6	1 2	5 2	99 41	47 22	41 24	2nd 2nd	Not held (Note: The Cup was not organized in the 1946–47 season due to overscheduling caused by the major changes of the football league system.)	—	—	—	—	—	—	Arsénio	29
1947–48	Primeira Divisão	26	19	3	4	84	35	41	2nd	SF	—	—	—	—	—	—	Julinho	25
1948–49	Primeira Divisão	26	17	3	6	72	34	37	2nd	W	—	—	—	—	—	—	Eduardo Corona	24
1949–50	Primeira Divisão	26	21	3	2	86	33	45	1st	Not held (Note: The Cup was not organized in the 1949–50 season because the Estádio Nacional was the host venue for the Latin Cup.)	—	—	—	—	Latin Cup	W	Julinho	28
1950–51	Primeira Divisão	26	12	6	8	81	43	30	3rd	W	—	—	—	—	—	—	Arsénio	35
1951–52	Primeira Divisão	26	18	4	4	76	26	40	2nd	W	—	—	—	—	—	—	José Águas	34
1952–53	Primeira Divisão	26	17	5	4	75	27	39	2nd	W	—	—	—	—	—	—	José Águas	35
1953–54	Primeira Divisão	26	13	6	7	62	40	32	3rd	R16	—	—	—	—	—	—	José Águas	24
1954–55	Primeira Divisão	26	18	3	5	61	20	39	1st	W	—	—	—	—	—	—	José Águas	26
1955–56	Primeira Divisão	26	19	5	2	76	31	43	2nd	R16	—	—	—	—	Latin Cup	3rd	José Águas	30
1956–57	Primeira Divisão	26	17	7	2	75	25	41	1st	W	—	—	—	—	Latin Cup	RU	José Águas	33
1957–58	Primeira Divisão	26	17	2	7	59	23	36	3rd	RU	—	—	European Cup	PR	—	—	José Águas	31
1958–59	Primeira Divisão	26	17	7	2	78	20	41	2nd	W	—	—	—	—	—	—	José Águas	29
1959–60	Primeira Divisão	26	20	5	1	75	27	45	1st	SF	—	—	—	—	—	—	José Águas	30
1960–61	Primeira Divisão	26	22	2	2	92	21	46	1st	R16	—	—	European Cup	W	—	—	José Águas	43
1961–62	Primeira Divisão	26	14	8	4	69	38	36	3rd	W	—	—	European Cup	W	Intercontinental Cup	RU	Eusébio	29
1962–63	Primeira Divisão	26	23	2	1	81	25	48	1st	SF	—	—	European Cup	RU	Intercontinental Cup	RU	Eusébio	38
1963–64	Primeira Divisão	26	21	4	1	103	26	46	1st	W	—	—	European Cup	1R	—	—	Eusébio	46
1964–65	Primeira Divisão	26	19	5	2	88	21	43	1st	RU	—	—	European Cup	RU	—	—	Eusébio	48
1965–66	Primeira Divisão	26	18	5	3	73	30	41	2nd	QF	—	—	European Cup	QF	—	—	Eusébio	37
1966–67	Primeira Divisão	26	20	3	3	64	19	43	1st	QF	—	—	Inter-Cities Fairs Cup	3R	—	—	Eusébio	38
1967–68	Primeira Divisão	26	18	5	3	75	19	41	1st	SF	—	—	European Cup	RU	—	—	Eusébio	50^{GS}
1968–69	Primeira Divisão	26	16	7	3	49	17	39	1st	W	—	—	European Cup	QF	—	—	Eusébio	29
1969–70	Primeira Divisão	26	17	4	5	58	14	38	2nd	W	—	—	European Cup	2R	—	—	Eusébio	25
1970–71	Primeira Divisão	26	18	5	3	62	17	41	1st	RU	—	—	Cup Winners' Cup	2R	—	—	Artur Jorge	36
1971–72	Primeira Divisão	30	26	3	1	81	16	55	1st	W	—	—	European Cup	SF	—	—	Artur Jorge	32
1972–73	Primeira Divisão	30	28	2	0	101	13	58	1st	R16	—	—	European Cup	2R	—	—	Eusébio	42^{GS}
1973–74	Primeira Divisão	30	21	5	4	68	23	47	2nd	RU	—	—	European Cup	2R	—	—	Eusébio	19
1974–75	Primeira Divisão	30	21	7	2	62	12	49	1st	RU	—	—	Cup Winners' Cup	QF	—	—	Mário Moinhos	18
1975–76	Primeira Divisão	30	23	4	3	94	20	50	1st	R32	—	—	European Cup	QF	—	—	Nené	35
1976–77	Primeira Divisão	30	23	5	2	67	24	51	1st	R16	—	—	European Cup	1R	—	—	Nené	27
1977–78	Primeira Divisão	30	21	9	0	56	11	51	2nd	QF	—	—	European Cup	QF	—	—	Nené	21
1978–79	Primeira Divisão	30	23	3	4	75	21	49	2nd	R32	—	—	UEFA Cup	2R	—	—	Nené	28
1979–80	Primeira Divisão	30	19	7	4	79	21	45	3rd	W	—	—	UEFA Cup	1R	—	—	Nené	36
1980–81	Primeira Divisão	30	22	6	2	72	15	50	1st	W	—	W	Cup Winners' Cup	SF	—	—	Nené	32
1981–82	Primeira Divisão	30	20	4	6	60	22	44	2nd	SF	—	RU	European Cup	2R	—	—	Nené	37
1982–83	Primeira Divisão	30	22	7	1	67	13	51	1st	W	—	—	UEFA Cup	RU	—	—	Nené	31
1983–84	Primeira Divisão	30	24	4	2	86	22	52	1st	R16	—	RU	European Cup	QF	—	—	Nené	27
1984–85	Primeira Divisão	30	18	7	5	65	28	43	3rd	W	—	RU	European Cup	2R	—	—	Michael Manniche	27
1985–86	Primeira Divisão	30	21	5	4	54	13	47	2nd	W	—	W	Cup Winners' Cup	QF	—	—	Michael Manniche	21
1986–87	Primeira Divisão	30	20	9	1	50	25	48 (Note: Benfica and Braga saw two points subtracted as the federation attributed a 3–0 defeat to both teams after crowd violence that occurred when they faced each other in the last matchday. The original result was 1–1.)	1st	W	—	RU	Cup Winners' Cup	2R	—	—	Rui Águas	20
1987–88	Primeira Divisão	38	19	13	6	59	25	51	2nd	SF	—	RU	European Cup	RU	—	—	Rui Águas	18
1988–89	Primeira Divisão	38	27	9	2	60	15	63	1st	RU	—	—	UEFA Cup	2R	—	—	Vata	18
1989–90	Primeira Divisão	34	23	9	2	76	18	55	2nd	R32	—	W	European Cup	RU	—	—	Mats Magnusson	40
1990–91	Primeira Divisão	38	32	5	1	89	18	69	1st	QF	—	—	UEFA Cup	1R	—	—	Rui Águas	26
1991–92	Primeira Divisão	34	17	12	5	62	23	46	2nd	SF	—	RU	European Cup	GS	—	—	Isaías	17
1992–93	Primeira Divisão	34	22	8	4	60	18	52	2nd	W	—	—	UEFA Cup	QF	—	—	Isaías	17
1993–94	Primeira Divisão	34	23	8	3	73	25	54	1st	R16	—	RU	Cup Winners' Cup	SF	—	—	João Vieira Pinto	18
1994–95	Primeira Divisão	34	22	5	7	61	28	49	3rd	QF	—	RU	Champions League	QF	—	—	Edílson	17
1995–96	Primeira Divisão (Note: Starting this season, league wins became worth 3 points, instead of the traditional 2 points.)	34	22	7	5	57	27	73	2nd	W	—	—	UEFA Cup	3R	—	—	João Vieira Pinto	23
1996–97	Primeira Divisão	34	17	7	10	49	30	58	3rd	RU	—	RU	Cup Winners' Cup	QF	—	—	João Vieira Pinto	16
1997–98	Primeira Divisão	34	20	8	6	62	29	68	2nd	SF	—	—	UEFA Cup	1R	—	—	Nuno Gomes	22
1998–99	Primeira Divisão	34	19	8	7	71	29	65	3rd	R32	—	—	Champions League	GS	—	—	Nuno Gomes	34
1999–2000	Primeira Liga	34	21	6	7	58	33	69	3rd	R16	—	—	UEFA Cup	3R	—	—	Nuno Gomes	20
2000–01	Primeira Liga	34	15	9	10	54	44	54	6th	R16	—	—	UEFA Cup	1R	—	—	Pierre van Hooijdonk	24
2001–02	Primeira Liga	34	17	12	5	66	37	63	4th	R32	—	—	—	—	—	—	Mantorras	13
2002–03	Primeira Liga	34	23	6	5	74	27	75	2nd	R64	—	—	—	—	—	—	Simão	18
2003–04	Primeira Liga	34	22	8	4	62	28	74	2nd	W	—	—	Champions League UEFA Cup	3Q 4R	—	—	Simão	15
2004–05	Primeira Liga	34	19	8	7	51	31	65	1st	RU	—	RU	Champions League UEFA Cup	3Q R32	—	—	Simão	22
2005–06	Primeira Liga	34	20	7	7	51	29	67	3rd	QF	—	W	Champions League	QF	—	—	Nuno Gomes	17
2006–07	Primeira Liga	30	20	7	3	55	20	67	3rd	R16	—	—	Champions League UEFA Cup	GS QF	—	—	Simão	16
2007–08	Primeira Liga	30	13	13	4	45	21	52	4th	SF	4R	—	Champions League UEFA Cup	GS R16	—	—	Óscar Cardozo	22
2008–09	Primeira Liga	30	17	8	5	54	32	59	3rd	R16	W	—	UEFA Cup	GS	—	—	Óscar Cardozo	17
2009–10	Primeira Liga	30	24	4	2	78	20	76	1st	R32	W	—	Europa League	QF	—	—	Óscar Cardozo	38
2010–11	Primeira Liga	30	20	3	7	61	31	63	2nd	W	SF	RU	Champions League Europa League	GS SF	—	—	Óscar Cardozo	23
2011–12	Primeira Liga	30	21	6	3	66	27	69	2nd	R16	W	—	Champions League	QF	—	—	Óscar Cardozo	28
2012–13	Primeira Liga	30	24	5	1	77	20	77	2nd	RU	SF	—	Champions League Europa League	GS RU	—	—	Óscar Cardozo	33
2013–14	Primeira Liga	30	23	5	2	58	18	74	1st	W	W	—	Champions League Europa League	GS RU	—	—	Lima	21
2014–15	Primeira Liga	34	27	4	3	86	16	85	1st	R16	W	W	Champions League	GS	—	—	Jonas	31
2015–16	Primeira Liga	34	29	1	4	88	22	88	1st	R32	W	RU	Champions League	QF	—	—	Jonas	36
2016–17	Primeira Liga	34	25	7	2	72	18	82	1st	W	SF	W	Champions League	R16	—	—	Kostas Mitroglou	27
2017–18	Primeira Liga	34	25	6	3	80	22	81	2nd	5R	3R	W	Champions League	GS	—	—	Jonas	37
2018–19	Primeira Liga	34	28	3	3	103	31	87	1st	SF	SF	—	Champions League Europa League	GS QF	—	—	Haris Seferovic	27
2019–20	Primeira Liga	34	24	5	5	71	26	77	2nd	RU	3R	W	Champions League Europa League	GS R32	—	—	Pizzi	30
2020–21	Primeira Liga	34	23	7	4	69	27	76	3rd	RU	SF	RU	Champions League Europa League	3Q R32	—	—	Haris Seferovic	26
2021–22	Primeira Liga	34	23	5	6	78	30	74	3rd	5R	RU	—	Champions League	QF	—	—	Darwin Núñez	34
2022–23	Primeira Liga	34	28	3	3	82	20	87	1st	QF	GS	—	Champions League	QF	—	—	Gonçalo Ramos	27
2023–24	Primeira Liga	34	25	5	4	77	28	80	2nd	SF	SF	W	Champions League Europa League	GS QF	—	—	Rafa Silva	22
2024–25	Primeira Liga	34	25	5	4	84	28	80	2nd	RU	W	—	Champions League	R16	Club World Cup	R16	Vangelis Pavlidis	30
2025–26	Primeira Liga	34	23	11	0	74	25	80	3rd	QF	SF	W	Champions League	KPO	—	—	Vangelis Pavlidis	30
