= 1963–64 S.L. Benfica season =

Benfica
1963–64 season
- President: António Fezas Vital (until 26 March 1964); Adolfo Vieira de Brito.
- Head coach: Lajos Czeizler
- Stadium: Estádio da Luz
- Primeira Divisão: Winners
- Taça de Portugal: Winners
- Taça de Ouro da Imprensa: Winners
- European Cup: Second round
- Ramón de Carranza Trophy: Winners
- Top goalscorer: League: Eusébio (28); All: Eusébio (46)
- Biggest win: Benfica 10–0 Seixal (2 February 1964)
- Biggest defeat: Dortmund 5-0 Benfica (4 December 1963)
Home colours	Away colours

The 1963–64 season was Sport Lisboa e Benfica's 60th season in existence and the club's 30th consecutive season in the top flight of Portuguese football, covering the period from 1 August 1963 to 31 July 1964. Domestically, Benfica competed in the Primeira Divisão and Taça de Portugal, while internationally participated in the European Cup.

In Lajos Czeizler’s first season as manager, the squad underwent several changes: new signings included Luciano, Serafim and Iaúca, while Manuel Serra, António Saraiva, António Mendes and former captain José Águas departed. The league title race remained closely contested, but Benfica led the table for most of the campaign and ultimately secured their 13th championship. In the Taça de Portugal, they advanced to the final and defeated Porto to claim the trophy, while in the Taça de Ouro da Imprensa they beat Sporting, winning all three domestic competitions. In the European Cup, however, Benfica were eliminated in the second round by Borussia Dortmund 6–2 on aggregate, following a heavy 5–0 defeat in the second leg, marking their first absence from the final in three years.

== Season summary ==
Despite winning the league title and reaching the European Cup final, the board of directors opted to part ways with Fernando Riera, appointing Lajos Czeizler as the new manager. Perceiving the rise of Italian dominance in Europe (between 1963 and 1965), Benfica hired Czeizler from Fiorentina. Known for an attacking philosophy similar to Béla Guttmann’s, his side went on to score nearly twice as many goals as the league's runners-up. Seeking to strengthen the squad's physical capabilities, the club signed Luciano, Iaúca and Serafim, while António Saraiva, António Mendes, Manuel Serra and former captain José Águas all departed.

Pre-season began on 31 August with participation in the Ramón de Carranza Trophy. In the semi-finals, Benfica defeated Barcelona, winners of the 1958 and 1960 Inter-Cities Fairs Cup, by 3–2. The following day, they won the final against Fiorentina, champions of the 1961 Cup Winners' Cup, with a 7–3 victory after extra time, in which Torres scored a hat-trick, Iaúca added two goals, and Serafim and Eusébio one each.

Benfica then played two fixtures of the José Águas tribute tour, defeating Porto 3–2 and Alhandra 6–0. Two further matches in the same tour were held later in November: a 1–0 loss to Stoke City and a 5–3 defeat to Sunderland. Still in September, a 1–0 victory over Belenenses sent Benfica to the final of the Taça de Honra, where they lost 3–0 to Sporting.

The official season opened on 22 September with a 12–1 aggregate win over Luso in the first round of the Taça de Portugal. In the European Cup preliminary round, Benfica drew 3–3 away against Distillery before winning 5–0 at home.

October brought a 17–1 aggregate win over SC Vianense in the Taça de Portugal and successive league wins over Seixal, Académica and Barreirense. Benfica closed November with a 2–2 home draw against Porto, finishing the month level on points with Belenenses at the top of the table. In the European Cup, they defeated Borussia Dortmund 2–1 at home, a match in which they created many opportunities but struggled with finishing, but suffered a heavy 5–0 defeat in Germany, leading to their earliest European Cup exit in three years.

In December, Benfica recorded two league wins and a draw, but lost 3–1 away to Sporting, concluding the calendar year in first place with a two-point lead. The team responded strongly in January with four consecutive victories, scoring 19 goals and conceding only three, extending their advantage to four points

In February Benfica continued their strong form with wins over Seixal, Académica and Barreirense, along with an away draw against Porto. Over the month's fixtures they scored 24 goals, extending their lead at the top of the table to five points. In March victories over Belenenses, Vitória de Guimarães, and Lusitano de Évora consolidated their advantage, despite a 2–2 home draw with Sporting. In the same month, Benfica (1962-63 league champions) faced Sporting (1962-63 Taça de Portugal winners) in the Taça de Ouro da Imprensa, claiming a 3kg gold trophhy after a 5–0 win.

Benfica opened April with a home win over CUF, securing their 13th league title with two matches left to play. They closed the campaign with two further wins, finishing six points clear of Porto. Before returning to the Taça de Portugal, the team faced Torino in the final match of the José Águas tribute tour, winning 4–1. In the Taça de Portugal, Benfica defeated Salgueiros (4–1 on aggregate), Lusitano de Évora (11–2 on aggregate), and Belenenses (6–1 on aggregate), to reach the final. On 5 July, Benfica defeated Porto 6–2 at the Estádio Nacional to lift the trophy, securing the domestic double (dobradinha), and winning all domestic competitions

== Competitions ==
Win Draw Loss Postponed

=== Overall record ===
Competition	First match	Last match	Record								
Competition	First match	Last match	G	W	D	L	GF	GA	GD	Win %	Source
Primeira Divisão	20 October 1963	19 April 1964	26	21	4	1	103	26	+77	80.77	
Taça de Portugal	22 September 1963	5 July 1964	11	10	1	0	56	9	+47	90.91	
Taça de Ouro	29 March 1964	29 March 1964	1	1	0	0	5	0	+5	100.00	
European Cup	25 September 1963	4 December 1963	4	2	1	1	10	9	+1	50.00	
Total			42	34	6	2	174	44	+130	80.95	

=== Primeira Divisão ===
==== League table ====
Pos	Team	Pld	W	D	L	GF	GA	GD	Pts	Qualification or relegation
1	Benfica (C)	26	21	4	1	103	26	+77	46	Qualification to European Cup preliminary round
2	Porto	26	16	8	2	51	20	+31	40	Qualification to Cup Winners' Cup first round
3	Sporting CP	26	13	8	5	49	26	+23	34	Qualification to Cup Winners' Cup first round
4	Vitória de Guimarães	26	16	2	8	62	42	+20	34	
5	CUF Barreiro	26	12	6	8	46	33	+13	30	

Source: RSSSF
(C) Champions

==== Results by round ====
Round	1	2	3	4	5	6	7	8	9	10	11	12	13	14	15	16	17	18	19	20	21	22	23	24	25	26
Ground	H	A	A	H	A	H	A	H	A	H	A	H	A	A	H	H	A	H	A	H	A	H	A	H	A	H
Result	W	W	W	W	W	D	D	W	L	W	W	W	W	W	W	W	W	W	D	W	W	D	W	W	W	W
Position	1	1	1	1	1	1	1	1	1	1	1	1	1	1	1	1	1	1	1	1	1	1	1	1	1	1

A = Away; H = Home; W = Win; D = Draw; L = Loss

==== Matches ====
20 October 1963 1	Benfica	5–2	Vitória de Setubal	Lisbon
	Santana 4', 80' (penalty); Serafim 35'; Simões 44'; Iaúca 72'		Carlos Manuel 20'; José Maria 27'	Stadium: Estádio da Luz; Referee: Braga Barros

27 October 1963 2	Olhanense	0–3	Benfica	Olhão
			Serafim 51'; Iaúca 62'; Santana 81'	Stadium: Estádio Padinha; Referee: Virgilio Baptista

3 November 1963 3	Seixal	2–3	Benfica	Seixal
	Necas 32'; Carvalho 42'		Serafim 4'; Iaúca 17', 74'	Stadium: Estádio do Bravo; Referee: Pinto Coelho

10 November 1963 4	Benfica	3–0	Académica	Lisbon
	Augusto 27'; Santana 80'; Coluna 88'			Stadium: Estádio da Luz; Referee: Clemente Henriques

17 November 1963 5	Barreirense	2–4	Benfica	Barreiro
	Costa 7'; Ludovico 58'		Simões 54', 74'; Iaúca 63'; Santana 89'	Stadium: Estádio D. Manuel de Mello; Referee: Rosa Nunes

24 November 1963 6	Benfica	2–2	Porto	Lisbon
	Santana 42', 46'		Carlos Duarte 41'; Jaime 60'	Stadium: Estádio da Luz; Referee: Marcos Lobato

1 December 1963 7	Belenenses	1–1	Benfica	Belém
	Fernando Peres 18'		Augusto 17'	Stadium: Estádio do Restelo; Referee: Eduardo Gouveia

8 December 1963 8	Benfica	2–1	Vitória de Guimarães	Lisbon
	Eusébio 78'; Serafim 89'		Peres 61'	Stadium: Estádio da Luz; Referee: Encarnação Salgado

15 December 1963 9	Sporting	3–1	Benfica	Lisbon
	Figueiredo 21', 69'; Morais 60'		Eusébio 77' (penalty)	Stadium: Estádio da Luz; Referee: Décio de Freitas

22 December 1963 10	Benfica	2–0	Lusitano de Évora	Lisbon
	Iaúca 17'; Pedras 76'			Stadium: Estádio da Luz

29 December 1963 11	CUF	0–3	Benfica	Lisbon
			Eusébio 26', 61'; Serafim 59'	Stadium: Estádio da Luz; Referee: Manuel Fortunato

5 January 1964 12	Benfica	7–0	Leixões	Lisbon
	Torres 20', 84'; Iaúca 36', 56', 82'; Eusébio 48', 62'			Stadium: Estádio da Luz

12 January 1964 13	Varzim	0–2	Benfica	Varzim
			Torres 15', 36'

19 January 1964 14	Vitória de Setubal	2–4	Benfica	Setúbal
	Quim Silva 12'; José Maria 20'		Eusébio 2'; Torres 54', 64', 69'	Stadium: Estádio do Bonfim

26 January 1964 15	Benfica	8–1	Olhanense	Lisbon
	José Neto 7'; Iaúca 43'; Augusto 54'; Torres 60', 62'; Coluna 84'; Eusébio 86', 88'		Henrique Reina 67'	Stadium: Estádio da Luz

2 February 1964 16	Benfica	10–0	Seixal	Lisbon
	Torres 5', 44'; Eusébio 8', 11', 15', 37', 52', 81'; Iaúca 39', 47'			Stadium: Estádio da Luz

9 February 1964 17	Académica	1–5	Benfica	Coimbra
	Oliveira Duarte 41'		José Torres 29'; Iaúca 39', 61'; Eusébio 67', 83'

16 February 1964 18	Benfica	8–0	Barreirense	Lisbon
	Eusébio 21', 28', 56'; Augusto 54'; Iaúca 62'; José Neto 67'; Torres 83'; Coluna 86'			Stadium: Estádio da Luz

23 February 1964 19	Porto	1–1	Benfica	Porto
	Joaquim Jorge 15'		Augusto 31'	Stadium: Estádio das Antas; Referee: Porfírio Silva

1 March 1964 20	Benfica	5–2	Belenenses	Lisbon
	Torres 25'; Augusto Silva 35'; Eusébio 54', 67' (penalty); Augusto 55'		Fernando Peres 37', 87'	Stadium: Estádio da Luz

8 March 1964 21	Vitória de Guimarães	1–4	Benfica	Guimarães
	Rodrigo 63'		Torres 20', 43'; Simões 35'; Eusébio 54'	Stadium: Estádio Dom Afonso Henriques

15 March 1964 22	Benfica	2–2	Sporting	Lisbon
	Augusto 20'; Eusébio 47'		Figueiredo 17'; Osvaldo Silva 82'	Stadium: Estádio da Luz; Referee: Aníbal Oliveira

22 March 1964 23	Lusitano de Évora	1–3	Benfica	Évora
	Torres 1', 10', 17', 19'; Augusto Silva 12'; Santana 32'		Torres 46', 50'; Eusébio 74'

5 April 1964 24	Benfica	2–1	CUF	Lisbon
	Eusébio 20', 41'		Emídio Uria 53'	Stadium: Estádio da Luz

12 April 1964 25	Leixões	1–5	Benfica	Porto
	Esteves 45'		Torres 6', 47', 87'; Eusébio 77'; Augusto 84'	Stadium: Campo de Santana; Referee: Diogo Manso

19 April 1964 26	Benfica	8–0	Varzim	Lisbon
	José Torres 12'; Augusto 15', 31', 54'; Augusto Silva 19'; Simões 43'; Pedras 57'; José Neto 62'			Stadium: Estádio da Luz

=== Taça de Portugal ===
==== First round ====
22 September 1963 First leg	Luso F.C.	0–6	Benfica	Barreiro
			Coluna 32'; Eusébio 35' (penalty) 80'; Augusto Silva 42'; Augusto 67', 77'	Stadium: Campo da Quinta Pequena; Referee: Vaz Valente

30 September 1963 Second leg	Benfica	6–1 (12–1 agg.)	Luso F.C.	Lisbon
	Serafim 19'; Eusébio 20', 30'; Augusto 40', 43', 50'			Stadium: Estádio da Luz

==== Second round ====
6 October 1963 First leg	Vianense	1–8	Benfica	Viana do Castelo
			Eusébio 4', 47', 49', 54', 72'; Augusto 28'; Serafim 43'; Iaúca 61'	Stadium: Estádio Dr. José de Matos; Referee: Pedro Santos

13 October 1963 Second leg	Benfica	9–0 (17–1 agg.)	Vianense	Lisbon
	Augusto 20', 67', 83'; Serafim 37'; Iaúca 52', 74', 87'; Santana 73'			Stadium: Estádio da Luz; Referee: Fernando Velez

==== Third Round ====
26 April 1964 First leg	Salgueiros	1–1	Benfica	Porto
			Torres 88'	Stadium: Estádio Engenheiro Vidal Pinheiro; Referee: Edmundo Carvalho

10 May 1964 Second leg	Benfica	3–1 (4–2 agg.)	Salgueiros	Lisbon
	Eusébio 35'; Jorge Calado 36'; Augusto Silva 85'			Stadium: Estádio da Luz; Referee: Virgílio Baptista

==== Quarter-finals ====
24 May 1964 First leg	Lusitano de Évora	1–8	Benfica	Évora
	José Pedro 69'		Augusto Silva 3'; Torres 19', 51'; Eusébio 34', 85', 87'; Simões 49'; Coluna 74'	Stadium: Campo Estrela; Referee: Marcos Lobato

13 June 1964 Second leg	Benfica	3–1 (11–2 agg.)	Lusitano de Évora	Lisbon
	Torres 26'; Pedras 33'; Manuel Serafim 74'			Stadium: Estádio da Luz; Referee: Encarnação Salgado

==== Semi-finals ====
22 June 1964 First leg	Benfica	3–1	Belenenses	Lisbon
21:45	Augusto 10', 88'; Torres 15'			Stadium: Estádio da Luz; Referee: Hermínio Soares

28 June 1964 Second leg	Belenenses	0–3 (1–6 agg.)	Benfica	Belém
			Raúl Machado 48'; Serafim 50'; Augusto 77'	Stadium: Estádio do Restelo; Referee: Marcos Lobato

==== Final ====
5 July 1964 Final	Benfica	6–2	Porto	Oeiras
	Augusto 10', 12'; Eusébio 30' (penalty); Simões 48'; Serafim 71'; Torres 82'		Custódio Pinto 17'; Carlos Baptista 70'	Stadium: Jamor; Referee: Rosa Nunes

=== Taça de Ouro da Imprensa ===
29 March 1964 Final	S.L. Benfica	5–0	Sporting	Belém
	Eusébio; Torres	Report		Stadium: Estádio do Restelo

=== European Cup ===
==== Preliminary round ====
25 September 1963 First leg	Distillery (Northern Ireland)	3–3	(Portugal) Benfica	Belfast
	Jack Kennedy 1'; Kenneth Hamilton 35'; Frederick Ellison 79'	Report	Manuel Serafim 15', 60'; Eusébio 58'	Stadium: Windsor Park; Attendance: 19,326; Referee: Joseph Hannet (Belgium)

2 October 1963 Second leg	Benfica (Portugal)	5–0 (8–3 agg.)	Distillery (Northern Ireland)	Lisbon
	Eusébio 24', 65'; Simões 37'; Yaúca 67'; Serafim 77'	Report		Stadium: Estádio da Luz; Attendance: 31,131; Referee: Hubert Burguet (Belgium)

==== First Round ====
6 November 1963 First leg	Benfica (Portugal)	2–1	(Germany) Dortmund	Lisbon
	Simões 46'; Eusébio 67'	Report	Wosab 54'	Stadium: Estádio da Luz; Attendance: 41,252; Referee: Pierre Schwinte (FRA)

4 December 1963 Second leg	Dortmund (Germany)	5–0 (6–2 agg.)	Benfica (Portugal)	Prague
	Konietzka 33'; Brungs 35', 37', 47'; Wosab 58'	Report		Stadium: Stadion Rote Erde; Attendance: 40,675; Referee: George McCabe (England)

=== Non-official matches ===
==== Ramón de Carranza Trophy ====
31 August 1963; Semi-Final	Benfica	3–2	Barcelona	Cádiz
	Serafim 26', 81'; Iaúca 50'		Ré 49'; Zaldua 66'	Stadium: Estadio Ramón de Carranza

1 September 1963; Final	Benfica	7–3	Fiorentina	Cádiz
	Serafim 53'; Eusébio 72'; Torres 82', 97', 107'; Iaúca 102', 109'		Hamrim 31', 76'; Lojacono 75'	Stadium: Estadio Ramón de Carranza; Referee: José Ortiz de Mendíbil

==== Friendlies ====
5 September 1963	Benfica	3–2	Porto	Lisbon
	Serafim; Torres			Stadium: Estádio da Luz

7 September 1963; Taça de Honra; Semi-Finals	Benfica	1–0	Belenenses	Estádio do Restelo
	Torres 56'			Stadium: Belém

11 September 1963; Taça de Honra; Final	Sporting	3–0	Benfica	Estádio do Restelo
	Mascarenhas 23'; Bé 31' (penalty) 71'			Stadium: Belém

12 November 1963	Stoke City	1–0	Benfica	Stoke-on-Trent
				Stadium: Victoria Ground

14 November 1963	Sunderland	5–3	Benfica	Lisbon
			Eusébio; Simões	Stadium: Estádio da Luz

1 January 1964	Leixões	0–4	Benfica	Matosinhos
			Torres 24'; Iaúca 57'; Arcanjo 89'; Luciano	Stadium: Estádio do Mar

6 May 1964	Torino F.C.	1–4	Benfica	Turin
			Eusébio; Torres	Stadium: Stadio Olimpico Grande Torino

16 June 1964 Florence Tournament; Semi-Finals	Benfica	0–1	Zenit	Florence
				Stadium: Stadio Artemio Franchi

20 June 1964 Florence Tournament; Third Place Game	Fiorentina	1–4	Benfica	Florence
			Augusto; Torres	Stadium: Stadio Artemio Franchi

== Player statistics ==
The squad for the season consisted of the players listed in the tables below, as well as staff member Fernando Riera (manager), Fernando Cabrita (assistant manager).

Note 1: Note: Flags indicate national team as defined under FIFA eligibility rules. Players may hold more than one non-FIFA nationality.

Note 2: Players with squad numbers marked ‡ joined the club during the 1963–64 season via transfer, with more details in the following section.

No.	Pos	Nat	Player	Total		Primeira Divisão		Taça de Portugal		Taça de Ouro		European Cup	
No.	Pos	Nat	Player	Apps	Goals	Apps	Goals	Apps	Goals	Apps	Goals	Apps	Goals
1	GK	(Portugal) POR	Costa Pereira	40	0	26	0	10	0	1	0	3	0
1	GK	(Portugal) POR	Zé Rita	3	0	1	0	1	0	1	0	0	0
	DF	(Portugal) POR	Augusto Silva	13	5	6	2	7	3	0	0	0	0
	DF	(Portugal) POR	Jacinto	7	0	7	0	0	0	0	0	0	0
	DF	(Portugal) POR	Luciano	27	0	20	0	4	0	0	0	3	0
	DF	(Portugal) POR	Ângelo Martins	4	0	3	0	1	0	0	0	0	0
2	DF	(Portugal) POR	Domiciano Cavém	39	0	26	0	8	0	1	0	4	0
3	DF	(Portugal) POR	Fernando Cruz	34	0	18	0	11	0	1	0	4	0
3	DF	(Portugal) POR	Humberto Fernandes	10	0	3	0	4	0	0	0	3	0
3	DF	(Portugal) POR	Germano	14	0	5	0	7	0	1	0	1	0
4	DF	(Portugal) POR	Raul Machado	18	1	6	0	9	1	0	0	3	0
	MF	(Portugal) POR	Jorge Calado	4	1	2	0	2	1	0	0	0	0
	MF	(Portugal) POR	Pedras	4	3	2	2	2	1	0	0	0	0
5	MF	(Portugal) POR	José Neto	23	3	18	3	4	0	1	0	0	0
6	MF	(Portugal) POR	Mário Coluna	34	5	22	3	8	2	1	0	3	0
7	FW	(Portugal) POR	José Augusto	37	25	25	11	8	14	1	0	3	0
8	FW	(Portugal) POR	Santana	12	8	8	7	2	1	0	0	2	0
9	FW	(Portugal) POR	José Torres	23	30	15	22	7	6	1	2	0	0
9	FW	(Portugal) POR	Iaúca	24	20	18	15	3	4	0	0	3	1
10	FW	(Portugal) POR	Eusébio	29	49	19	28	6	14	1	3	3	4
11	FW	(Portugal) POR	António Simões	39	9	25	5	9	2	1	0	4	2
11	FW	(Portugal) POR	Serafim	24	14	12	5	8	6	0	0	4	3
