= Honey massage =

Soft tissue massage

Honey massage is a type of soft tissue massage in which honey is applied as an emollient on the skin.

Depending on the technique used by the massotherapist, honey massage can either be very relaxing or slightly painful for the patient. Prior to the session, the professional involved must ensure that the patient is not allergic to honey.

The essence of the honey massage is the use of the product's adhesive qualities. After honey is poured over a specific area of the body, the massage therapist alternately places and withdraws their hands from the salve. Although the procedure is simple to perform at first, it becomes progressively more difficult due to the increase of tension force between the hands and the honey which binds them to the skin. The massage lasts until the palms no longer stick to the massaged area and the honey disappears from it. The actual duration depends on the type and quality of the honey used.

== See also ==
- Massage
- Types of massage
- Vibromassage
- Hydro massage
- Cryomassage
