= Sport Clube da Catumbela =

Angolan football club

SC Catumbela
- Full name: Sport Clube da Catumbela
- Ground: Estádio Municipal de Benguela, Angola

Sport Clube da Catumbela is an Angolan football club based in Catumbela in western Angola, south of Luanda.

In 1945 the team won the Girabola.

== Notable players ==
- Joaquim Santana Silva Guimarães

== Honours ==
- Girabola: 1945, 1958
