= Jesus Crespo =

Portuguese footballer

Personal information
- Full name: Jesus Muñoz Crespo
- Date of birth: 11 September 1899
- Place of birth: Portugal
- Date of death: 11 September 1979 (aged 80)
- Position: Forward

Senior career*
Years	Team	Apps	(Gls)
1917–1929	Benfica	101	(39)

International career
1923	Portugal	1	(0)
- * Club domestic league appearances and goals

Jesus Muñoz Crespo (11 September 1899 – 11 September 1979) was a Portuguese footballer who played as a forward.

== Career ==
Crespo arrived at Benfica in 1917, at the age of 18. He made his official debut in the first game of the 1917–18 edition of the Campeonato de Lisboa, on 16 December 1917.

Capable of playing either as inside forward or centre-forward, in a 2-3-5 formation, he was mainly used as inside forward and partnered with José Simões, while both supported players like Alberto Augusto, Tavares, or Mário Carvalho. On 16 December 1923, he received his only cap, in a 0-3 loss against Spain played on Avenida de la Reina Victoria, Sevilla.

Over the course of 12 seasons, he played more than 100 matches, a club record at that time, retiring at age 30, with his last match on 24 February 1929.

== Honours ==
Benfica

- Campeonato de Lisboa (2)
- Taça de Honra (2)
