= Luciano Fernandes =

Portuguese footballer

Luciano
Personal information
- Full name: Luciano Jorge Fernandes
- Date of birth: 6 August 1940
- Place of birth: Olhão, Portugal
- Date of death: 5 December 1966 (aged 26)
- Place of death: Lisbon, Portugal
- Position: Centre back

Senior career*
| Years | Team | Apps | (Gls) |
| 1959–1963 | Olhanense | 44 | (1) |
| 1963–1966 | Benfica | 33 | (0) |
| Total | | 77 | (1) |

International career
| 1961 | Portugal U21 | 1 | (0) |
- * Club domestic league appearances and goals

Luciano Jorge Fernandes (6 August 1940 – 5 December 1966) was a Portuguese footballer who played as a central defender.

== Club career ==
Born in Olhão, Algarve, Luciano started out at local club S.C. Olhanense at age 19. His composure and assuredness in possession earned him the nickname Germano II, in honour of S.L. Benfica player Germano. He moved to the latter side in 1963, and coach Lajos Czeizler displayed him in the right-back position until he injured his knee, needing an operation.

Luciano was again bothered by physical problems upon his return, now in the ankle, only returning to full fitness in the 1966–67 season.

== Death ==
On 5 December 1966, Benfica's new hydro massage bath short-circuited with seven players inside, Luciano being the only one immersed. Eusébio, Jaime Graça and Santana escaped with burns, whilst José Carmo Pais, Domiciano Cavém and Amândio Malta da Silva were knocked unconscious until Graça managed to climb out the pool and cut off the power supply; Luciano died immediately at the age of 26, and the team played the rest of the campaign in black, winning the league.

== Honours ==
Benfica

- Primeira Liga: 1963–64, 1964–65, 1966–67
- Taça de Portugal: 1963–64
