= 1906–07 Sport Lisboa season =

Benfica
1906–07 season
- Presidents: Luís Carlos de Faria Leal; José Rosa Rodrigues
- Coach: Manuel Gourlade
- Campeonato de Lisboa: 2nd
Home colours

The 1906–07 season was Sport Lisboa e Benfica's third season in existence and the club's first competitive season, still under the name Sport Lisboa.

This season, Benfica finished second to Carcavelos SC in the Campeonato de Lisboa, the only official competition at the time, composed of four teams. Benfica's most memorable match of the season was the 2–1 win against Carcavelos, a team that was filled with English players and that was unbeaten since 1898.

== Campeonato de Lisboa ==
=== Table ===
Pos	Team	Pld	W	D	L	GF	GA	GD	Pts
1	Carcavelos	6	5	0	1	17	4	+13	10
2	Benfica	6	3	0	3	5	6	−1	6
3	Internacional	6	2	0	4	3	7	−4	4
4	Lisbon Cricket	6	2	0	4	5	13	−8	4

Rules for classification: 1) Points; 2) Head-to-head points; 3) Head-to-head goal difference.

=== Matches ===
4 November 1906 1	Carcavelos	3–1	Benfica	Campo da Quinta Nova, Cascais
			António Rosa Rodrigues

22 November 1906 2	Lisbon Cricket	1–0	Benfica	Lisbon

22 January 1907 3	Benfica	1–0	Internacional	Campo da Quinta Nova, Cascais

10 February 1907 4	Benfica	2–1	Carcavelos

16 February 1907 5	Benfica	0–1	Lisbon Cricket

3 March 1907 6	Internacional	0–1	Benfica

== Player statistics ==
No.	Pos	Nat	Player	Total		1906–07 Campeonato de Lisboa	
No.	Pos	Nat	Player	Apps	Goals	Apps	Goals
	MF	(Portugal) POR	Albano dos Santos	6	0	6	-
	MF	(Portugal) POR	António Couto	4	0	4	-
	FW	(Portugal) POR	António Rosa Rodrigues	6	0	6	-
	FW	(Portugal) POR	Cândido Rosa Rodrigues	6	0	6	-
	FW	(Portugal) POR	Carlos França	1	0	1	-
	FW	(Portugal) POR	Daniel Queirós dos Santos	6	0	6	-
	FW	(Portugal) POR	David da Fonseca	5	0	5	-
	DF	(Portugal) POR	Emílio de Carvalho	5	0	5	-
	MF	(Portugal) POR	Fortunato Levy	6	0	6	-
	DF	(Portugal) POR	Henrique Costa	6	0	6	-
	FW	(Portugal) POR	José Neto	1	0	1	-
	GK	(Portugal) POR	Manuel Mora	6	0	6	-
	FW	(Portugal) POR	Marcial Costa	6	0	6	-
	MF	(Portugal) POR	Marcolino Bragança	2	0	2	-
