= Cryomassage =

Massage using cold temperatures

Cryomassage is a type of massage involving the application of superficial cold to body tissue, typically using ice or liquid nitrogen. As a cryotherapy technique, cryomassage has been used to treat physical injury, skin disorders such as rosacea and facial erythrosis (redness), and facial nerve neuropathy.

== Methodology ==
General cryomassage is performed with ice packs or cryocare packs. General cryomassage is said to initiate tissue regeneration and repair, improve muscular blood circulation, and reduce inflammation. As with other cryotherapy, cryomassage can induce an analgesic effect.

In cosmetology, cryomassage is performed with liquid nitrogen.

== See also ==
- Cryotherapy
- Hydro massage
- Vibromassage
