= Clube Atlético de Luanda =

Angolan football club

Atlético de Luanda
- Full name: Clube Atlético de Luanda
- Ground: Estádio da Cidadela; Luanda, Angola
- Capacity: 40,000
- League: Girabola

Clube Atlético de Luanda, best known as Atlético de Luanda, is a football club from Luanda, Angola. The club won its first title, the Girabola, in 1965.
