= Hydro massage =

Use of water pressure for massage techniques

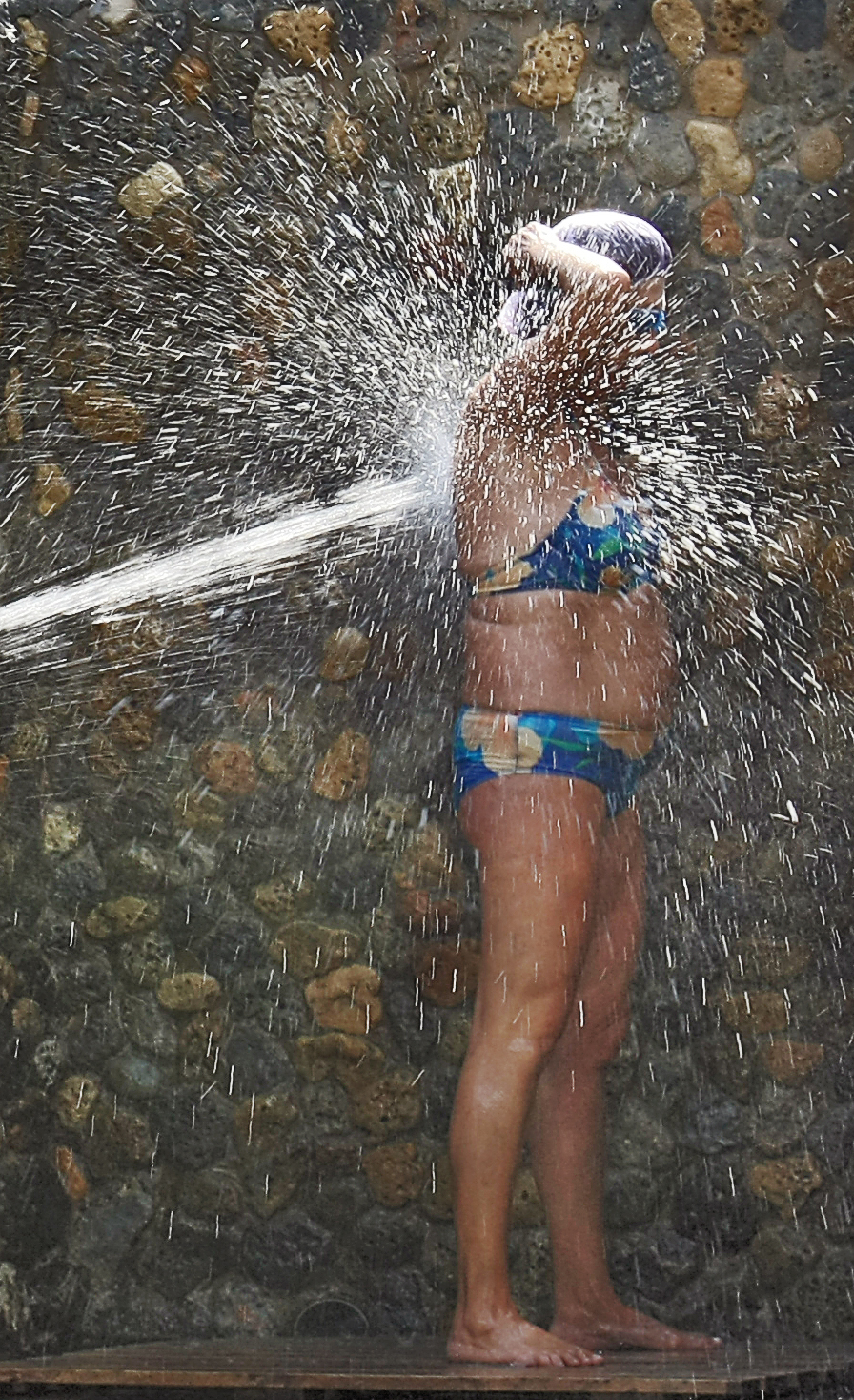
Hydro massage

Hydro massage is a massage technique which uses water pressure and temperature to reduce muscle tension, improve blood flow, and reduce stress.

== Potential dangers of hydro massage ==
As with any form of massage, physical therapy, or water activity, certain health conditions can potentially be aggravated by hydro massage, and it may be advised by physicians for those with these conditions to avoid it. Conditions that pose serious risks include the following:

- Certain types of blood disorders, especially bleeding, bruising, broken or weak capillaries, or any condition in which blood vessels may be compromised.
- Neurological symptoms and disorders (also includes systematic diseases).
- Infections or communicable diseases.
- Skin disorders, such as severe acne, psoriasis, or eczema.
- Acute inflammatory responses, such as fever, feelings of excessive heat on any part of the body, loss of function, rash, redness, or swelling.
- Injuries, fractures, or open wounds.
- Blood pressure disorders (hypertension or hypotension)
- Heart conditions.
- Second or third-degree burns
- Pregnancy
- Thrombosis or blood clotting disorders
- Spinal conditions and diseases, especially bulging, ruptured, or herniated discs

== History of hydro massage ==
Hydro massage is a natural remedy that has been known and used for years. The history of hydrotherapy goes back as far as ancient Greece, but it was made popular by the Romans, who introduced the benefits of bathing and massage to the countries they conquered. Roman public baths were always recognized as a great source of relaxation, where members of high society and all free people could enjoy the benefits of hot and cold water, as well as a massage.

Modern hydro massage started with Tobias Smollett. His 1752 essay On the External Use of Water described pumped water as useful in the treatment of "hysterical disorders, obstruction of the menses and all cases in which it was necessary to make a revulsion from the head and to invite the juices downward". Since the 1960s, hydro massage has been gaining popularity. Every year, more advanced hydro massage equipment appears, making it easily available to many people, as these tools and equipment are now accessible for home use.

Today, hydro massage is still widely popular, and used for many ailments and conditions.

== Dry water hydro massage ==
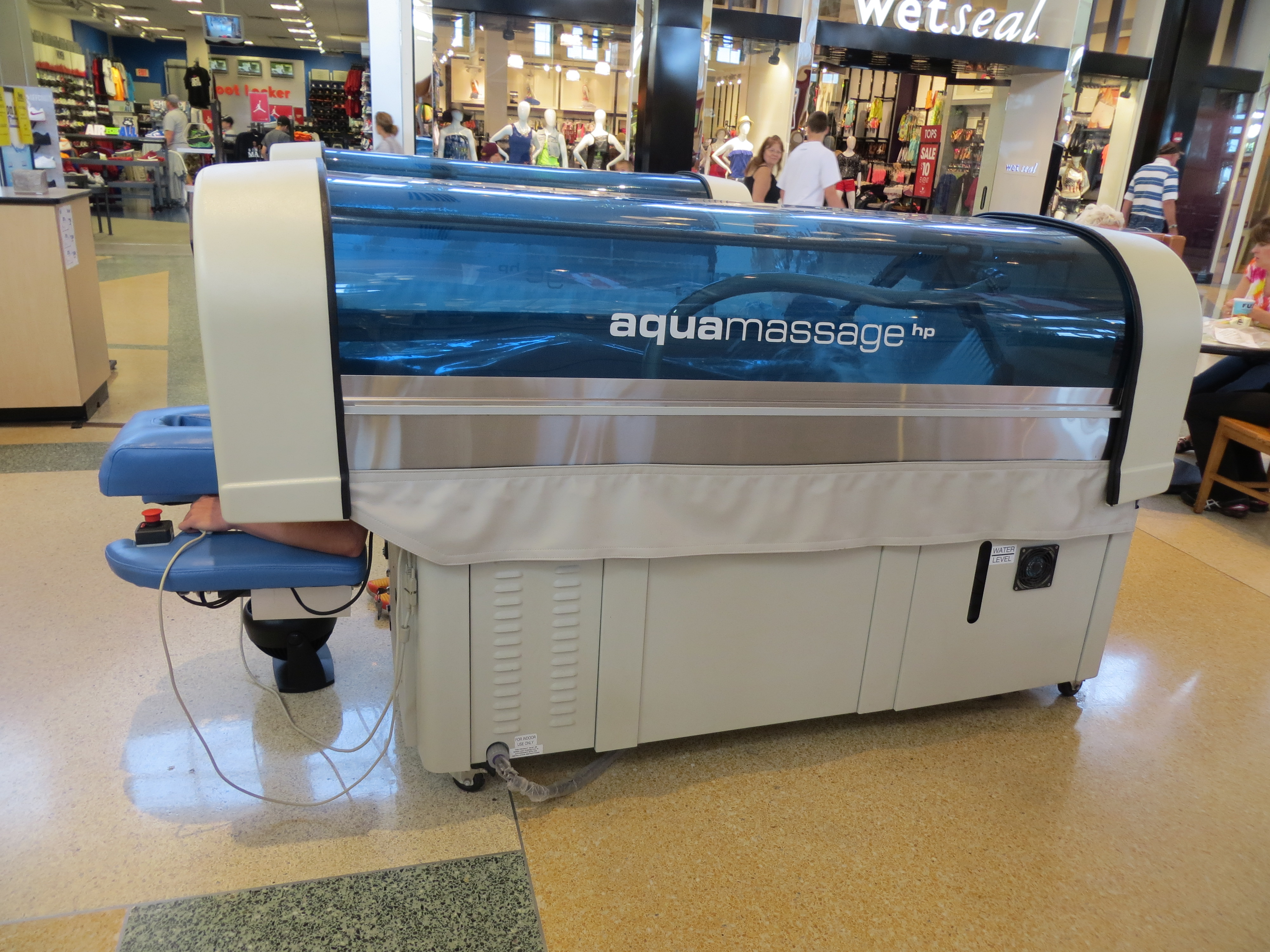
A form of dry hydrotherapy in a shopping mall.

Dry water massage typically consists of a bed or bed-like design. The user lies down on or sits in the waterproof material barrier while still completely clothed. On the other side of the barrier is a system of various water jets, that utilize different pressures, temperature, and speed settings to massage the body.

Before using any form of hydro massage, especially dry water hydro massage, it is important to consult a physician to ensure that no health risks are involved.

== See also ==
- Massage
- Vibromassage
- Honey massage
- Cryomassage
- Hydrotherapy
- Jacuzzi
