= Vibromassage =

Type of massage based on the use of mechanical devices for vibration therapy

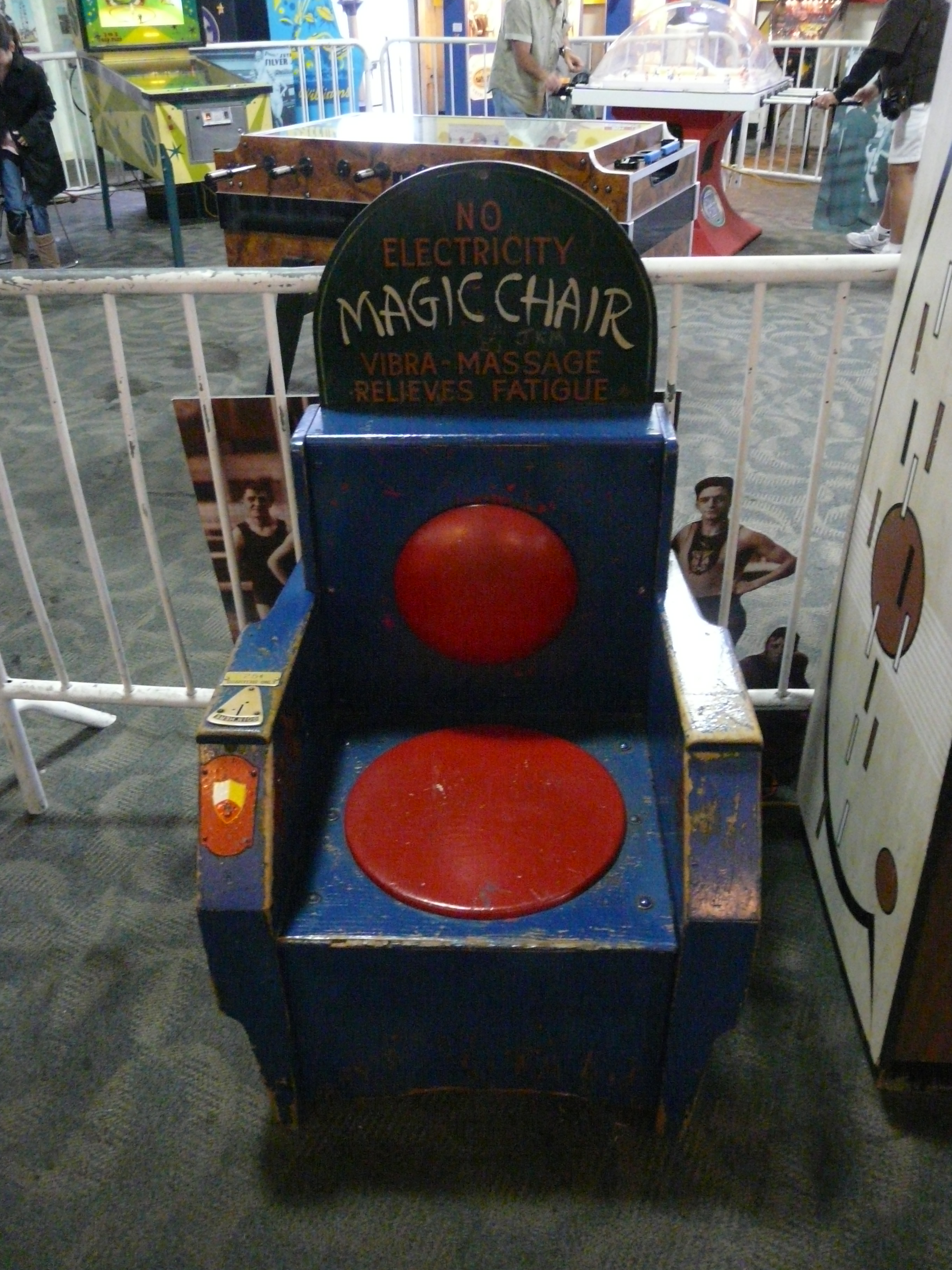
An early vibromassage chair at the Musée Mécanique in San Francisco, California, U.S.

Vibromassage (also called vibratory massage, vibra-massage, vibration therapy) is a type of massage based on the use of mechanical devices for vibration therapy, which pass vibration onto the body surface that is being massaged. Vibromassage can be both general and local.

== History ==
The application of manual vibration to the human body therapeutically has been known for centuries. The history of vibromassage through mechanical devices is not very long, although the vibration itself as a massaging technique dates back thousands of years.

Massage, of which vibration has always been an essential part, was known to Ancient Greeks and Romans, Chinese and Slavs; in the 5th century B.C. Herodicus compelled his patients to have their body rubbed, as he firmly believed in the efficacy of massage. Other advocates of massage application were Plato, Socrates, and Hippocrates. The letter said that "rubbing can bind a joint that is too loose, and loosen a joint that is too rigid. Hard rubbing binds, soft rubbing loosens, much rubbing causes parts to waste, moderate rubbing makes them grow." Hippocrates also suggested the direction in which to apply massage the art of rubbing up, thereby assisting mechanical and physical processes, aiding circulation, relieving stasis and consequently quickening metabolic processes.

In the 19th century massage was given an impetus by "Swedish Movement Cure" written by Ling. In the middle of the 19th century, Zander constructed mechanical motion devices for treating neuralgia; Taylor of New York and Kellogg of Michigan were also among pioneer inventors which constructed and used mechanical apparatuses for massage, which could perform vibrating, shaking, rolling, percussion, compression, and friction.

The next step of vibromassage advancement took place when inventors introduced mechanical apparatus by means of which treatment could be more localized.

== See also ==
- Honey massage
- Hydro massage
