= António Saraiva =

Portuguese footballer

Saraiva
Personal information
- Full name: António da Cruz Pinto Saraiva
- Date of birth: 3 May 1934
- Place of birth: Peso da Régua, Portugal
- Date of death: 7 May 2018 (aged 84)
- Place of death: Portimão, Portugal
- Height: 1.81 m (5 ft 11 in)
- Position: Defender

Youth career
- 1974–1977: Benfica

Senior career*
Years	Team	Apps	(Gls)
1954–1955	SC Régua		
1955–1956	Salgueiros		
1956–1959	Caldas	74	(3)
1959–1963	Benfica	29	(1)
Total		103	(4)
- * Club domestic league appearances and goals

António da Cruz Pinto Saraiva (3 May 1934 – 7 May 2018), simply known as Saraiva, was a Portuguese footballer who played as a defender, either in the center or in the right.

== Career ==
Born in Peso da Régua, Saraiva started playing in his hometown club, Sport Club Régua, before moving to S.C. Salgueiros. In 1956, he joined Caldas Sport Clube, drawing the attention of S.L. Benfica, that acquire him in 1959, after Caldas was relegated.

Making his debut on 22 November 1959 at hands of Béla Guttmann, over the course of four seasons, he makes 29 league appearances with one goal. He played his last match for Benfica on 24 March 1963, with Fernando Riera.

== Honours ==
Benfica

- European Cup; 1960-61, Runner-up 1961-62
- Portuguese League: 1959–60, 1960–61, 1962–63
- Portuguese Cup: 1961-62
