= União Almeirim =

Portuguese association football club

- Full name: União Futebol Clube de Almeirim
- Founded: 24 June 1934; 91 years ago
- Ground: Dom Manuel de Mello
- Capacity: 2,000
- President: Jorge Palhinha
- Manager: Valter Guedes
- League: Santarém FA Second Division
- 2022–23: Santarém FA Second Division, 5th of 12
- Website: www.uniaoalmeirim.com.pt
Home colours	Away colours

União Futebol Clube de Almeirim is a Portuguese association football club, founded in Almeirim in 1934. They play in the Santarém FA Second Division, holding home matches at the Estádio Dom Manuel de Mello.

== History ==
Founded on 24 June 1934 as União Foot-Ball Club de Almeirim by Jacinto Pereira, Adelino Soler, Manuel Pereira, Renato André, Diamantino Correia e Manuel de Oliveira, the club started playing in 1945, with their youth sides playing in the Campeonato Regional de Juniores. They won their first title in 1954, after lifting the second division of the regional leagues.

União Almeirim first reached the Terceira Divisão in 1968, and achieved a first-ever promotion to Segunda Divisão in 1985. In the 2000s, they struggled severely with financial problems, and had a project named "Viver UFCA" started to revitalize the club in 2013.
