= Álvaro Inácio =

Portuguese footballer (born 1935)

Personal information
- Full name: Álvaro Santos Fortes Inácio
- Date of birth: 28 September 1935 (age 91)
- Place of birth: Lisbon, Portugal
- Position: Midfielder

Youth career
- 1957–1961: Benfica

Senior career*
Years	Team	Apps	(Gls)
1954–1958	Belenenses	9	(0)
1958–1959	Atlético CP		
1959–1961	Benfica	1	(0)
1961–1963	Atlético CP	45	(2)
1963–1964	Olhanense	9	(0)
1964–1965	Vitória Guimarães	22	(1)

International career
1954	Portugal U18	5	(1)
- * Club domestic league appearances and goals

Álvaro Santos Fortes Inácio (born 28 September 1935) is a former Portuguese professional footballer.

== Career statistics ==
=== Club ===
Club	Season	League			Cup		Other		Total	
Club	Season	Division	Apps	Goals	Apps	Goals	Apps	Goals	Apps	Goals
Belenenses	1954–55	Primeira Divisão	0	0	0	0	0	0	0	0
Belenenses	1955–56	Primeira Divisão	0	0	0	0	0	0	0	0
Belenenses	1956–57	Primeira Divisão	2	0	0	0	0	0	2	0
Belenenses	1957–58	Primeira Divisão	7	0	0	0	0	0	7	0
Belenenses	Total		9	0	0	0	0	0	9	0
Benfica	1959–60	Primeira Divisão	0	0	1	0	0	0	1	0
Benfica	1960–61	Primeira Divisão	1	0	2	0	0	0	3	0
Benfica	Total		1	0	3	0	0	0	4	0
Atlético CP	1961–62	Primeira Divisão	26	0	2	0	0	0	28	0
Atlético CP	1962–63	Primeira Divisão	19	2	0	0	0	0	19	2
Atlético CP	Total		45	2	2	0	0	0	47	2
Olhanense	1963–64	Primeira Divisão	9	0	0	0	0	0	9	0
Vitória Guimarães	1964–65	Primeira Divisão	22	1	0	0	0	0	22	1
Career total			29	4	6	2	0	0	35	6
