= Jorge Tavares (footballer, born 1905) =

Portuguese footballer

Personal information
- Full name: Jorge Gonçalves Tavares
- Date of birth: 21 January 1905
- Place of birth: Portugal
- Date of death: 1951 (aged 45–46)
- Position: Forward

Senior career*
Years	Team	Apps	(Gls)
1924–1932	Benfica	93	(37)

International career
1926–1929	Portugal	3	(0)
- * Club domestic league appearances and goals

Jorge Gonçalves Tavares (21 January 1905 – 1951) was a Portuguese footballer who played as a forward.

== Club career ==
Tavares joined S.L. Benfica at the age of 19. He made his official debut on 19 October 1924, against C.F. Os Belenenses.

Used mainly as a centre forward, Tavares was consistently one of the Lisbon team's top scorers, ranking first in the 1924–25 and 1925–26 seasons. He helped the club conquer its first national titles, the 1930 and 1931 Campeonato de Portugal, and retired on 26 January 1932 at the age of 27.

== International career ==
Tavares gained three caps for Portugal in nearly three years, his first coming on 18 April 1926 in a 2–4 friendly loss to France. He was an unused squad member at the 1928 Football Olympic tournament.
