= José Neto (footballer, born 1935) =

Portuguese footballer (1935–1999)

Personal information
- Full name: José António Conceiçāo Neto
- Date of birth: 5 October 1935
- Place of birth: Montijo, Portugal
- Date of death: 6 July 1999 (aged 63)
- Height: 1.65 m (5 ft 5 in)
- Position: Defensive midfielder

Senior career*
Years	Team	Apps	(Gls)
1958–1966	Benfica	94	(5)
1966–1967	Braga	6	(0)
- * Club domestic league appearances and goals

José António Conceiçāo Neto (5 October 1935 – 6 July 1999) was a Portuguese footballer who played as a defensive midfielder for Benfica. He was part of their European Cup victories in the 1960–61 and 1961–62 campaigns.

== Honours ==
Benfica

- Primeira Divisão: 1959–60, 1960–61, 1963–64, 1964–65
- Taça de Portugal: 1958–59, 1961–62, 1963–64
- European Cup: 1960–61, 1961–62
- Intercontinental Cup runner-up: 1961
