= 1966–67 Taça de Portugal =

Tournament details
- Country: Portugal
- Dates: 30 October 1966 – 9 July 1967
- Teams: 46

Final positions
- Champions: Vitória de Setúbal (2nd title)
- Runners-up: Académica de Coimbra

Tournament statistics
- Matches played: 89
- Goals scored: 326 (3.66 per match)
- Top goal scorer(s): Artur Jorge; Ernesto (12 goals)

The 1966–67 Taça de Portugal was the 27th edition of the Portuguese football knockout tournament, organized by the Portuguese Football Federation (FPF). The 1966–67 Taça de Portugal began on 30 October 1966. The final was played on 9 July 1967 at the Estádio Nacional.

Braga were the previous holders, having defeated Vitória de Setúbal 1–0 in the previous season's final. Defending champions Braga were unable to regain the Taça de Portugal as they were defeated by Académica de Coimbra in the semi-finals. Vitória de Setúbal claimed their second cup trophy by defeating Académica de Coimbra 3–2.

== First round ==
All first round first leg ties were played on the 30 October, whilst the second legs were played between the 3–6 November. Cup ties which ended in a tied aggregate score were replayed at a later date. Teams from the Primeira Liga (I) and the Portuguese Second Division (II) entered at this stage.

Team 1	Agg.	Team 2	1st leg	2nd leg	3rd leg
Alhandra (II)	2 – 5	Tirsense (II)	1 – 2	1 – 3	
Barreirense (II)	3 – 6	Vitória de Setúbal (I)	2 – 2	1 – 4	
Beira-Mar (I)	9 – 1	Almada (II)	3 – 1	6 – 0	
Belenenses (I)	7 – 1	Oriental (II)	3 – 0	4 – 1	
Fabril Barreiro (I)	8 – 1	União de Tomar (II)	5 – 0	3 – 1	
Famalicão (II)	1 – 6	Atlético CP (I)	1 – 0	0 – 6	
Cova da Piedade (II)	2 – 4	Lusitano de Évora (II)	2 – 2	0 – 2	
Leixões (II)	10 – 2	Torres Novas (II)	3 – 2	7 – 0	
Leões Santarém (II)	3 – 4	Leça (II)	2 – 1	1 – 3	
Olhanense (II)	4 – 5	Sanjoanense (I)	2 – 2	0 – 0	2 – 3
Oliveirense (II)	4 – 6	Académica de Coimbra (I)	4 – 3	0 – 3	
Ovarense (II)	0 – 9	Benfica (I)	0 – 6	0 – 3	
Portimonense (II)	1 – 11	Vitória de Guimarães (I)	0 – 3	1 – 8	
Salgueiros (II)	0 – 4	Varzim (I)	0 – 0	0 – 4	
Seixal (II)	2 – 5	Académico de Viseu (II)	1 – 1	1 – 4	
Sintrense (II)	3 – 2	Luso (II)	1 – 0	1 – 2	1 – 0
Sporting CP (I)	1 – 2	Porto (I)	1 – 1	0 – 1	
Sporting da Covilhã (II)	1 – 2	Penafiel (II)	0 – 0	1 – 2	
Sporting de Espinho (II)	1 – 8	Braga (I)	1 – 1	0 – 7	
Torreense (II)	4 – 6	Montijo (II)	3 – 1	1 – 5	
União de Lamas (II)	1 – 3	Peniche (II)	0 – 1	1 – 2	

== Second round ==
Ties were played between the 15–29 January. Due to the odd number of teams involved at this stage of the competition, Varzim qualified for the next round due to having no opponent to face at this stage of the competition.

Team 1	Agg.	Team 2	1st leg	2nd leg
Académica de Coimbra (I)	11 – 3	Leça (II)	2 – 1	9 – 2
Académico de Viseu (II)	2 – 10	Sanjoanense (I)	1 – 1	1 – 9
Braga (I)	3 – 1	Atlético CP (I)	2 – 0	1 – 1
Leixões (I)	3 – 2	Tirsense (II)	3 – 1	0 – 1
Lusitano de Évora (II)	1 – 11	Benfica (I)	1 – 3	0 – 8
Montijo (II)	4 – 5	Beira-Mar (I)	4 – 0	0 – 5
Penafiel (II)	1 – 7	Vitória de Guimarães (I)	1 – 2	0 – 5
Peniche (II)	0 – 4	Belenenses (I)	0 – 0	0 – 4
Porto (I)	4 – 3	Fabril Barreiro (I)	3 – 2	1 – 1
Vitória de Setúbal (I)	5 – 1	Sintrense (II)	3 – 0	2 – 1

== Third round ==
Ties were played between the 14–21 May. Due to the odd number of teams involved at this stage of the competition, Vitória de Setúbal qualified for the next round due to having no opponent to face at this stage of the competition. Angrense, Atlético Luanda, Marítimo and Ténis Bissau were invited to participate in the competition.

Team 1	Agg.	Team 2	1st leg	2nd leg
Atlético Luanda (N/A)	1 – 9	Académica de Coimbra (I)	0 – 7	1 – 2
Belenenses (I)	1 – 2	Porto (I)	1 – 1	0 – 1
Benfica (I)	–	Angrense (N/A)		
Leixões (I)	4 – 1	Marítimo (N/A)	1 – 1	1 – 2
Ténis Bissau (N/A)	3 – 11	Beira-Mar (I)	0 – 6	3 – 5
Varzim (I)	3 – 4	Sanjoanense (I)	1 – 2	2 – 2

== Quarter-finals ==
Ties were played on the 11–18 June.

Team 1	Agg.	Team 2	1st leg	2nd leg
Académica de Coimbra (I)	3 – 2	Benfica (I)	2 – 0	1 – 2
Beira-Mar (I)	0 – 3	Braga (I)	0 – 3	0 – 0
Sanjoanense (I)	3 – 5	Porto (I)	1 – 3	2 – 2
Vitória de Setúbal (I)	6 – 0	Leixões (I)	3 – 0	3 – 0

== Semi-finals ==
Ties were played between the 25–30 June and the 2 July.

Team 1	Agg.	Team 2	1st leg	2nd leg
Académica de Coimbra (I)	6 – 2	Braga (I)	2 – 1	4 – 1
Porto (I)	4 – 7	Vitória de Setúbal (I)	0 – 3	4 – 4

== Final ==
9 July 1967

Académica de Coimbra	2 – 3 (a.e.t.)	Vitória de Setúbal
Celestino 5'; Ernesto 117'	(Report)	José Maria 43'; Guerreiro 97'; João 144'

Estádio Nacional, Oeiras
Referee: Heliodoro Garcia (Lisbon)
