= Santana (footballer) =

Portuguese-angolan footballer

Joaquim Santana
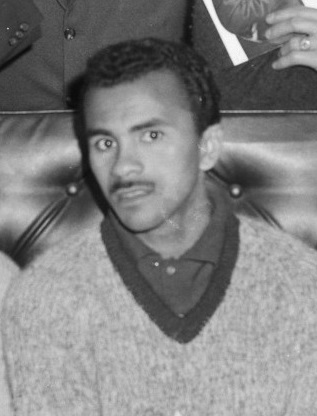
- Santana in 1963

Personal information
- Full name: Joaquim Santana Silva Guimarães
- Date of birth: 22 March 1936
- Place of birth: Lobito, Angola
- Date of death: 24 April 1989 (aged 53)
- Place of death: Freamunde, Portugal
- Height: 1.72 m (5 ft 8 in)
- Position: Right half

Youth career
- Catumbela
- Benfica

Senior career*
Years	Team	Apps	(Gls)
1954–1967	Benfica	108	(51)

International career
1960–1963	Portugal	5	(1)
- * Club domestic league appearances and goals

Joaquim Santana Silva Guimarães (22 March 1936 – 24 April 1989), known as Santana, was a Portuguese-angolan footballer who played as a right half.

A Portugal international, he played his entire career with Benfica.

== Club career ==
Santana was born in Lobito, Benguela Province, Portuguese Angola. After starting playing football in Angola for Sport Clube da Catumbela, he joined Portuguese first division club S.L. Benfica at the age of 18, being promoted to the first team two years later.

With Benfica, Santana appeared in 162 official games and scored 79 goals, winning six national championships and three Portuguese Cups. In the 1960–61 edition of the European Cup he played an essential role as the club won the competition, netting four goals in nine matches, including one in the final against FC Barcelona (3–2); he lost his importance in the following seasons (which included two more European Cup finals), after the arrival of another player from the colonies, Eusébio.

== International career ==
Santana was capped five times for Portugal, scoring one goal. His debut came on 8 May 1960 against Yugoslavia for the 1960 European Nations' Cup, and he found the net in the 2–1 win in Lisbon, but the national team lost the second leg 1–5 and did not make it to the last-four in France.

Almost three years later, against Bulgaria at the Stadio Olimpico in Rome, Santana played his last game, a 1964 European Nations' Cup qualifier replay (0–1 loss).

== Honours ==
Benfica

- Primeira Divisão: 1956–57, 1959–60, 1960–61, 1962–63, 1963–64, 1964–65, 1966–67
- Taça de Portugal: 1958–59, 1961–62, 1963–64
- Taça de Honra (2)
- European Cup: 1960–61, 1961–62
- Intercontinental Cup runner-up: 1962

== See also ==
- List of one-club men
