= 2014 UEFA Europa League final =

- Match programme cover
- Event: 2013–14 UEFA Europa League
Sevilla	Benfica
(Spain)	(Portugal)
0	0
- After extra time Sevilla won 4–2 on penalties
- Date: 14 May 2014
- Venue: Juventus Stadium, Turin
- Man of the Match: Ivan Rakitić (Sevilla)
- Referee: Felix Brych (Germany)
- Attendance: 33,120
- Weather: Sunny; 16 °C (61 °F); 40% humidity

The 2014 UEFA Europa League final was the final match of the 2013–14 UEFA Europa League, the 43rd season of Europe's secondary club football tournament organised by UEFA, and the fifth season since it was renamed from the UEFA Cup to the UEFA Europa League. It was played at the Juventus Stadium in Turin, Italy on 14 May 2014, between Spanish side Sevilla and Portuguese side Benfica. Sevilla won the match 4–2 on penalties, following a 0–0 draw after extra time.

Sevilla secured their third title in eight years, after winning the competition in 2006 and 2007. With this triumph, they joined Juventus (1977, 1990, 1993), Inter Milan (1991, 1994, 1998) and Liverpool (1973, 1976, 2001) as the teams with the most wins. Benfica lost their second consecutive UEFA Europa League final, following their defeat against Chelsea in the 2013 final. Including their runner-up finish in 1983, Benfica is the team with the most lost finals in the competition.

As the winners, Sevilla earned the right to play against 2013–14 UEFA Champions League winners Real Madrid in the 2014 UEFA Super Cup.

== Venue ==
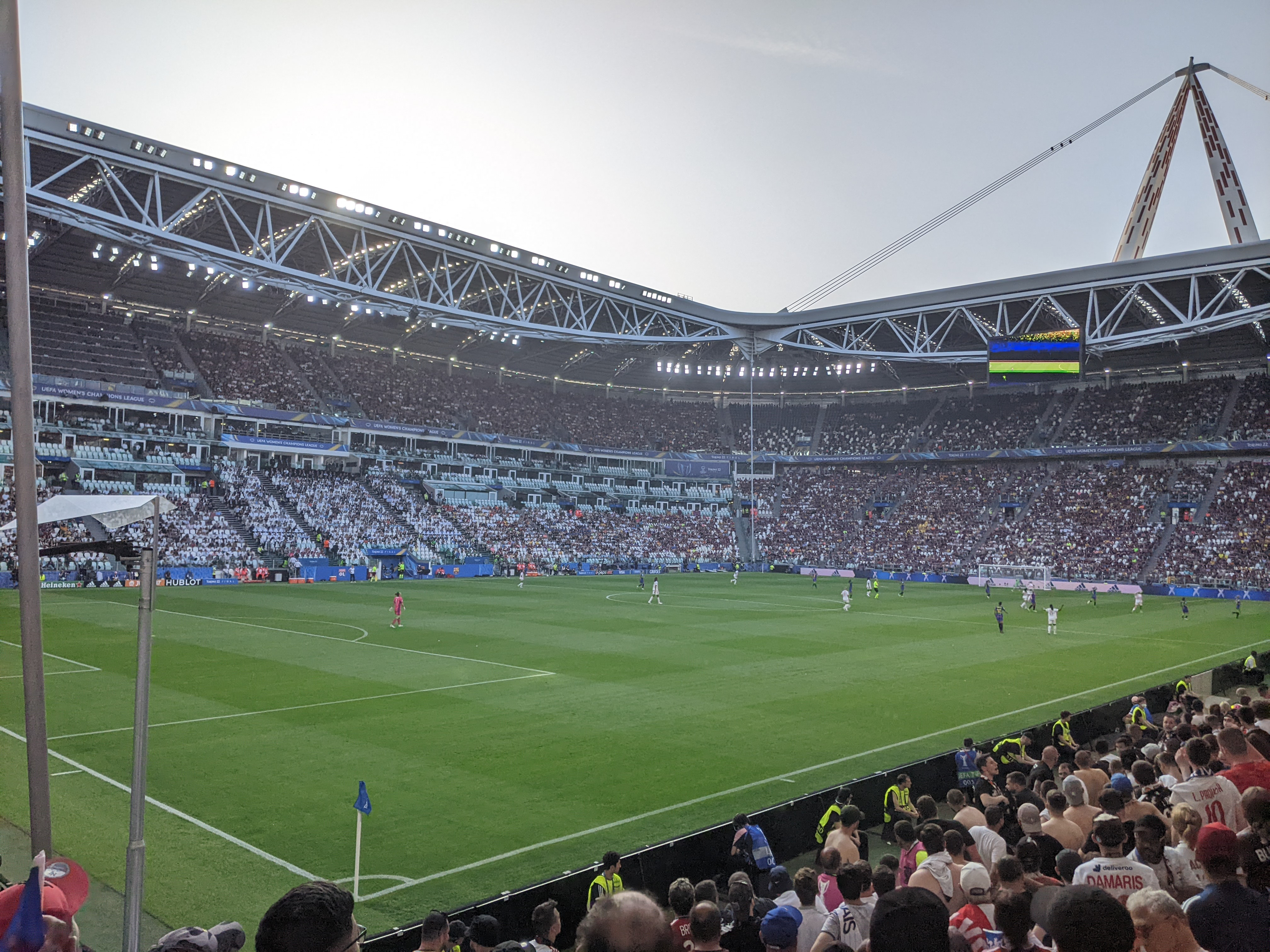
The Juventus Stadium in Turin, Italy, hosted the final.

The Juventus Stadium in Turin, Italy, was chosen as the venue of the match at a UEFA Executive Committee meeting in Istanbul, Turkey, on 20 March 2012. It is the home stadium of Juventus since 2011. This was the first time that a one-legged final was hosted in Turin. Previous UEFA Cup finals contested over two legs have had one of their matches played in Turin. The first legs of the 1977 UEFA Cup final and the 1990 UEFA Cup final, both contested by Juventus, were played at the Stadio Comunale (now the Stadio Olimpico di Torino). The first leg of the 1992 UEFA Cup final, contested by Torino, and the second leg of the 1993 UEFA Cup final, contested by Juventus, were played at the Stadio delle Alpi, which has been demolished to make way for the Juventus Stadium.

== Background ==
After a comeback by their opponents Valencia, who had lost the first leg 2–0, Sevilla secured their presence in the final after Stéphane Mbia's injury-time header qualified them on away goals. Sevilla had previously played in two UEFA Cup finals, winning both times in 2006 and 2007, and were aiming to become the fourth team to win three UEFA Cup/Europa League titles, after Juventus, Inter Milan and Liverpool.

Benfica reached their second consecutive Europa League final, after defeating Juventus 2–1 on aggregate and denying their opponents a chance to play the final at their home stadium. It was the first time a club has reached consecutive finals in the competition, having featured in the Champions League group stage on each occasion. Both of their previous UEFA Cup/Europa League finals, in 1983 and 2013, ended in defeats. They had also played in seven European Cup finals (1961, 1962, 1963, 1965, 1968, 1988, 1990). After winning successive European titles in 1961 and 1962, they had lost seven straight major European finals.

The final was Sevilla's 19th match in the competition, having started their participation in the third qualifying round against Montenegrin side Mladost Podgorica. They only qualified for the competition after Málaga were banned and Rayo Vallecano were denied a UEFA licence. Benfica transitioned from the Champions League group stage, after finishing third in their group, behind Paris Saint-Germain and Olympiacos. They became the first team to reach the Europa League final without conceding a defeat, registering six wins and two draws in eight knockout phase matches.

The only previous meeting between Sevilla and Benfica in European competition was in the 1957–58 European Cup preliminary round. The first leg at Estadio de Nervión, won by Sevilla 3–1, marked the European debut of both clubs. The second leg at Estádio da Luz ended 0–0, giving Sevilla the victory on aggregate, and they later reached the quarter-finals before losing to eventual champions Real Madrid.

== Route to the final ==
Note: In all results below, the score of the finalist is given first (H: home; A: away).

(Spain) Sevilla				Round	(Portugal) Benfica			
Europa League					Champions League			
Opponent	Agg.	1st leg	2nd leg	Qualifying phase (EL, CL)	Opponent	Agg.	1st leg	2nd leg
(Montenegro) Mladost Podgorica	9–1	3–0 (H)	6–1 (A)	Third qualifying round	Bye			
(Poland) Śląsk Wrocław	9–1	4–1 (H)	5–0 (A)	Play-off round	Bye			
Opponent	Result			Group stage (EL, CL)	Opponent	Result		
(Portugal) Estoril	2–1 (A)			Matchday 1	(Belgium) Anderlecht	2–0 (H)		
(Germany) SC Freiburg	2–0 (H)			Matchday 2	(France) Paris Saint-Germain	0–3 (A)		
(Czech Republic) Slovan Liberec	1–1 (A)			Matchday 3	(Greece) Olympiacos	1–1 (H)		
(Czech Republic) Slovan Liberec	1–1 (H)			Matchday 4	(Greece) Olympiacos	0–1 (A)		
(Portugal) Estoril	1–1 (H)			Matchday 5	(Belgium) Anderlecht	3–2 (A)		
(Germany) SC Freiburg	2–0 (A)			Matchday 6	(France) Paris Saint-Germain	2–1 (H)		
Group H winners: Pos / Team / Pld / Pts; 1 / (Spain) Sevilla / 6 / 12; 2 / (Czech Republic) Slovan Liberec / 6 / 9; 3 / (Germany) SC Freiburg / 6 / 6; 4 / (Portugal) Estoril / 6 / 3; Source: Soccerway				Final standings	Group C third place: Pos / Team / Pld / Pts; 1 / (France) Paris Saint-Germain / 6 / 13; 2 / (Greece) Olympiacos / 6 / 10; 3 / (Portugal) Benfica / 6 / 10; 4 / (Belgium) Anderlecht / 6 / 1; Source: UEFA			
Group H winners: Pos / Team / Pld / Pts; 1 / (Spain) Sevilla / 6 / 12; 2 / (Czech Republic) Slovan Liberec / 6 / 9; 3 / (Germany) SC Freiburg / 6 / 6; 4 / (Portugal) Estoril / 6 / 3; Source: Soccerway					Europa League			
Opponent	Agg.	1st leg	2nd leg	Knockout phase	Opponent	Agg.	1st leg	2nd leg
(Slovenia) Maribor	4–3	2–2 (A)	2–1 (H)	Round of 32	(Greece) PAOK	4–0	1–0 (A)	3–0 (H)
(Spain) Real Betis	2–2 (4–3 p)	0–2 (H)	2–0 (A)	Round of 16	(England) Tottenham Hotspur	5–3	3–1 (A)	2–2 (H)
(Portugal) Porto	4–2	0–1 (A)	4–1 (H)	Quarter-finals	(Netherlands) AZ	3–0	1–0 (A)	2–0 (H)
(Spain) Valencia	3–3 (a)	2–0 (H)	1–3 (A)	Semi-finals	(Italy) Juventus	2–1	2–1 (H)	0–0 (A)

== Pre-match ==
=== Ambassador ===
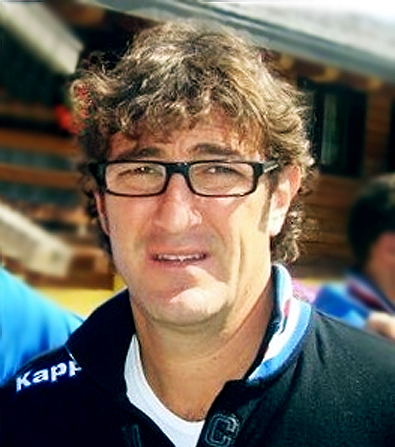
Ciro Ferrara was the ambassador for the final.

Former Italy international and Juventus player Ciro Ferrara, who won the UEFA Cup in 1989 with Napoli, was named as the ambassador for the final.

=== Identity ===
UEFA unveiled the visual identity of the final on 30 August 2013, the same day as the group stage draw.

=== Ticketing ===
The international ticket sales phase for the general public ran from 27 February to 25 March 2014. Tickets were available in four price categories: €150, €100, €70, and €45.

=== Officials ===
German referee Felix Brych was named by UEFA on 7 May 2014 as the referee of the final. The rest of the refereeing team are fellow countrymen Mark Borsch and Stefan Lupp as assistant referees, Tobias Welz and Bastian Dankert as additional assistant referees, Thorsten Schiffner as reserve assistant referee, and Serbia's Milorad Mažić as the fourth official.

=== Team selection ===
Benfica were not able to play either Enzo Pérez or Lazar Marković, both of whom were sent off in the second leg of their semi-final. Eduardo Salvio, who was booked in that match, was also suspended.

== Match ==
=== Summary ===
At full-time, the game was locked at 0–0. After a further 30 minutes of extra time, both sides were still scoreless. This meant the match was the first final to end goalless and the first to be decided by penalty shoot outs. Sevilla won the penalty shoot out 4–2, their goals coming from Carlos Bacca, Stéphane Mbia, Coke and Kevin Gameiro. Lima and Luisão scored for Benfica, while Sevilla goalkeeper Beto saved goals from Óscar Cardozo and Rodrigo. Paul Gardner writing for Soccer America opined that the assistant referee standing on the goal line allowed Beto to advance too far when he saved the two goals and that Benfica should have been allowed to take the shots again.

=== Details ===
14 May 2014
20:45 UTC+2

Sevilla (Spain)	0–0 (a.e.t.)	(Portugal) Benfica
	Report
Penalties
Bacca (penalty scored); Mbia (penalty scored); Coke (penalty scored); Gameiro (penalty scored)	4–2	(penalty scored) Lima; (penalty missed) Cardozo; (penalty missed) Rodrigo; (penalty scored) Luisão

Juventus Stadium, Turin
Attendance: 33,120
Referee: Felix Brych (Germany)

Sevilla	Benfica

GK	13	(Portugal) Beto
RB	23	(Spain) Coke	(yellow card) 98'
CB	21	(Argentina) Nicolás Pareja
CB	2	(Argentina) Federico Fazio	(yellow card) 11'
LB	16	(Spain) Alberto Moreno	(yellow card) 13'
DM	40	(Cameroon) Stéphane Mbia
DM	6	(Portugal) Daniel Carriço
CM	11	(Croatia) Ivan Rakitić (c)
RW	19	(Spain) José Antonio Reyes		(substituted off) 78'
LW	20	(Spain) Vitolo		(substituted off) 110'
CF	9	(Colombia) Carlos Bacca
Substitutes:
GK	1	(Spain) Javi Varas
DF	3	(Spain) Fernando Navarro
DF	5	(Portugal) Diogo Figueiras		(substituted on) 110'
MF	7	(Germany) Marko Marin		(substituted on) 78'	(substituted off) 104'
MF	12	(Spain) Vicente Iborra
MF	15	(Germany) Piotr Trochowski
FW	18	(France) Kevin Gameiro			(substituted on) 104'
Manager:
(Spain) Unai Emery

GK	41	(Slovenia) Jan Oblak
RB	14	(Uruguay) Maxi Pereira
CB	4	(Brazil) Luisão (c)
CB	24	(Argentina) Ezequiel Garay
LB	16	(Brazil) Guilherme Siqueira	(yellow card) 30'	(substituted off) 99'
RM	6	(Portugal) Ruben Amorim
CM	30	(Portugal) André Gomes
LM	20	(Argentina) Nicolás Gaitán		(substituted off) 119'
RF	8	(Serbia) Miralem Sulejmani		(substituted off) 25'
CF	11	(Brazil) Lima
LF	19	(Spain) Rodrigo
Substitutes:
GK	1	(Brazil) Artur
DF	3	(Portugal) Steven Vitória
DF	33	(Brazil) Jardel
MF	10	(Serbia) Filip Đuričić
MF	34	(Portugal) André Almeida	(yellow card) 100'	(substituted on) 25'
FW	7	(Paraguay) Óscar Cardozo		(substituted on) 99'
FW	90	(Portugal) Ivan Cavaleiro		(substituted on) 119'
Manager:
(Portugal) Jorge Jesus

Man of the Match:
Ivan Rakitić (Sevilla)

Assistant referees:
Mark Borsch (Germany)
Stefan Lupp (Germany)
Fourth official:
Milorad Mažić (Serbia)
Additional assistant referees:
Tobias Welz (Germany)
Bastian Dankert (Germany)
Reserve assistant referee:
Thorsten Schiffner (Germany)

Match rules

- 90 minutes.
- 30 minutes of extra time if necessary.
- Penalty shoot-out if scores still level.
- Seven named substitutes.
- Maximum of three substitutions.

=== Statistics ===
First half
Statistic	Sevilla	Benfica
Goals scored	0	0
Total shots	4	6
Shots on target	3	4
Saves	4	3
Ball possession	53%	47%
Corner kicks	2	2
Fouls committed	11	12
Offsides	2	0
Yellow cards	2	1
Red cards	0	0

Second half
Statistic	Sevilla	Benfica
Goals scored	0	0
Total shots	4	12
Shots on target	3	10
Saves	10	3
Ball possession	53%	47%
Corner kicks	2	5
Fouls committed	6	8
Offsides	0	1
Yellow cards	0	0
Red cards	0	0

Extra time
Statistic	Sevilla	Benfica
Goals scored	0	0
Total shots	3	3
Shots on target	1	1
Saves	1	1
Ball possession	44%	56%
Corner kicks	0	0
Fouls committed	4	5
Offsides	3	0
Yellow cards	1	1
Red cards	0	0

Overall
Statistic	Sevilla	Benfica
Goals scored	0	0
Total shots	11	21
Shots on target	7	15
Saves	15	7
Ball possession	51%	49%
Corner kicks	4	7
Fouls committed	21	25
Offsides	5	1
Yellow cards	3	2
Red cards	0	0

== See also ==
- 2014 UEFA Champions League final
- 2014 UEFA Super Cup
- Sevilla FC in European football
- S.L. Benfica in international football
- 2013–14 Sevilla FC season
- 2013–14 S.L. Benfica season
