= S.L. Benfica in international football =

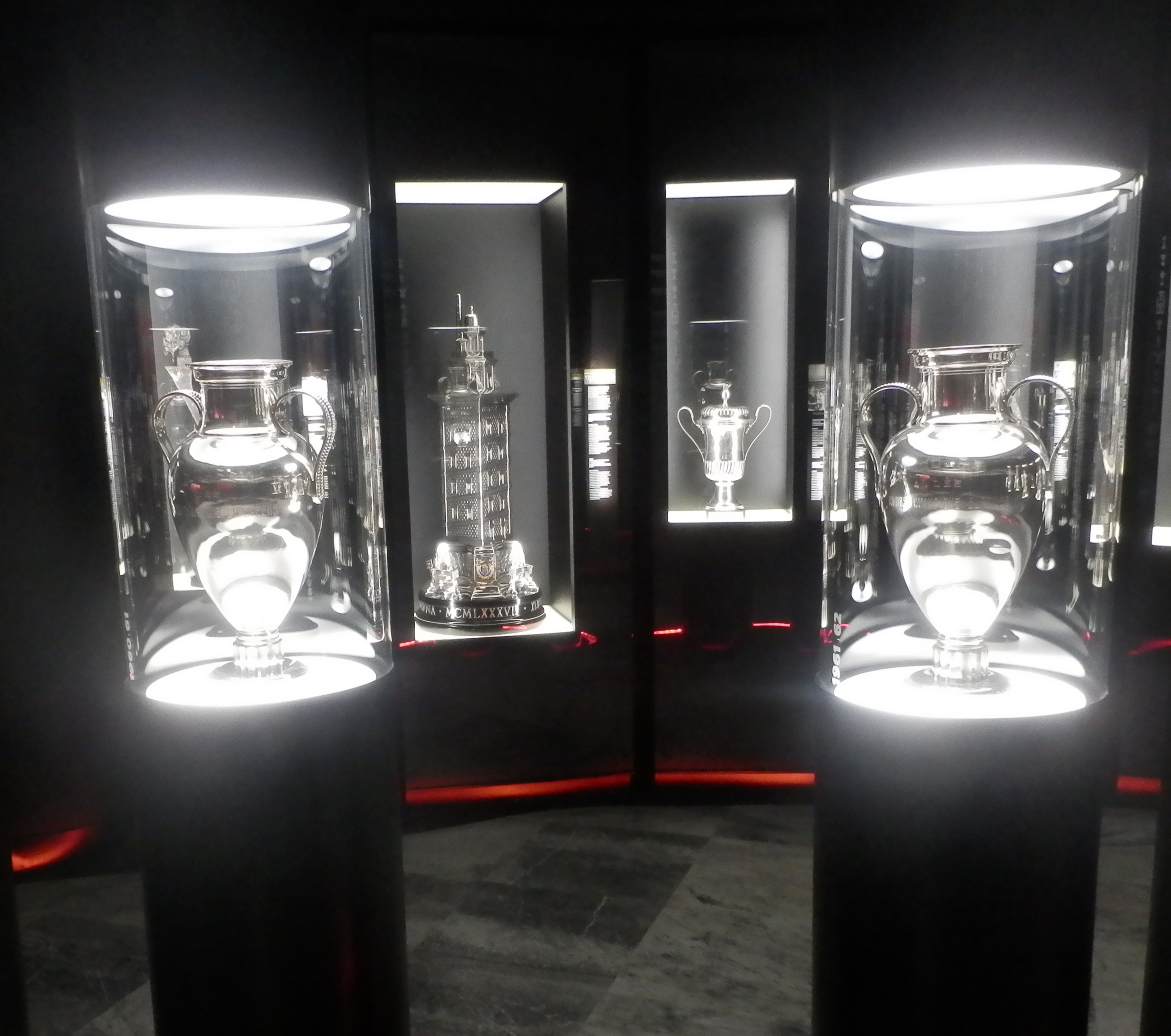
- The 1961 and 1962 European Cup trophies on display at Museu Cosme Damião
- Club: S.L. Benfica
- Seasons played: 66
- Top scorer: Eusébio (56)
- First entry: 1957–58 European Cup
- Latest entry: 2026–27 UEFA Europa League

Titles
- Champions League: 2 (1961, 1962)

Sport Lisboa e Benfica is a Portuguese professional football club based in the city of Lisbon whose involvement in European competition dates back to the 1950s. As champions of Portugal, Benfica were supposed to participate in the inaugural edition of the European Cup in 1955, but they were not invited by the organizers. Two years later, Benfica made their European debut against Sevilla in the European Cup, on 19 September 1957.

Benfica won their first international trophy in 1950, beating Bordeaux on home soil to win the Latin Cup. Benfica's first European title came in 1961, defeating Barcelona to win the European Cup, and successfully retained the title in the following year after defeating Real Madrid. After that, they appeared in five more finals (1963, 1965, 1968, 1988 and 1990) but did not reconquer the title. Benfica has also reached three UEFA Cup/UEFA Europa League finals (1983, 2013 and 2014).

With two consecutive European Cup titles, a Portuguese record, Benfica are the second most decorated Portuguese team in overall UEFA competitions and hold the Portuguese record for most appearances in finals of UEFA competitions, with ten appearances. Additionally, their 43 participations in the Champions League (formerly the European Cup) are only surpassed by Real Madrid, and as of September 2025, Benfica occupy the seventh place at the competition's all-time ranking.

Benfica's biggest European win is 10–0, which came against Stade Dudelange of Luxembourg for the 1965–66 European Cup, and their 18–0 aggregate win (8–0 in the first leg) constitutes a European Cup record. Brazilian defender Luisão holds the club record for most appearances in Europe, with 124 matches, while Portuguese striker Eusébio is the club's leading European goalscorer, with 56 goals.

== Background ==
Before the start of UEFA-organized competitions, Benfica had already participated in the Latin Cup, an international tournament played between league winners from Portugal, Spain, France, and Italy. The Latin Cup, created in 1949 and recognized by FIFA, is considered one of the precursors to European club competitions; it was organized by the respective national federations and had great prestige at the time. Benfica participated in several editions, notably reaching the final in 1950 and the 1957 against Bordeaux and Real Madrid, respectively.

The first continental competition organised by UEFA was the European Cup in 1955. Conceived by Gabriel Hanot, the editor of L'Équipe, as a competition for winners of the European national football leagues, it is considered the most prestigious European football competition. That year, Benfica had won the Primeira Divisão, but the European Cup organizers selected Sporting CP to take part in the first edition. Another club competition, the Inter-Cities Fairs Cup, was established in 1955 and contested in parallel with the European Cup. It eventually came under the auspices of UEFA in 1971, who rebranded it as UEFA Cup. Since the 2009–10 season, the competition has been known as the UEFA Europa League.

In 1957, Benfica won the league title and assured their European debut in the 1957–58 European Cup. The following years, UEFA created additional club competitions. The first, the Cup Winners' Cup, was inaugurated in 1960 for the winners of domestic cup competitions. Established in 1973, the UEFA Super Cup was originally a match played between the winners of the European Cup and the Cup Winners' Cup. Since 2000, it has been contested by the winners of the Champions League (formerly the European Cup) and the Europa League (formerly the UEFA Cup).

The Intercontinental Cup was a competition for the winners of the European Cup (the later UEFA Champions League) and its South American equivalent, the Copa Libertadores. Established in 1960, the Intercontinental Cup was jointly organised by UEFA and the Confederación Sudamericana de Fútbol (CONMEBOL). It ran until 2004, when it was replaced by the FIFA Club World Cup, which includes the winners of all six continental confederations' premier club competitions.

Starting in 2025, FIFA introduced a new format for the Club World Cup, which now features 32 teams, including the winners of continental competitions from the previous four seasons. The tournament is played every four years, similar to the national teams World Cup, and represents the highest level of club competition globally.

== Latin Cup and European rise ==
Benfica's first European silverware came in 1950 when, managed by Ted Smith, they beat French side Bordeaux at the Estádio Nacional in Oeiras, Portugal, to win the Latin Cup. Seven years later, the team reached their second and last Latin Cup final, but lost to Alfredo Di Stéfano's Real Madrid.

After an unsuccessful UEFA competition debut in the 1957–58 European Cup, where they lost to Sevilla in the initial round, Benfica hired Hungarian manager Béla Guttmann, who led the team to their first ever European Cup final on 31 May 1961. Having overcome Heart of Midlothian, Újpest Dózsa, AGF Aarhus and Rapid Wien, Benfica faced Barcelona in the final, where goals from José Águas, Mário Coluna and an own goal from Antoni Ramallets helped the club lift their first European Cup. The following year, Guttmann guided the team to back-to-back European Cup successes. After defeating Austria Wien, 1. FC Nürnberg and Tottenham Hotspur, Benfica met Real Madrid in the final on 2 May 1962. A hat-trick from Ferenc Puskás put the Spanish champions ahead before half-time, but a double from Coluna and rising star Eusébio overturned the score to 5–3.

After consecutive European Cup wins, Guttmann reportedly approached the club's board of directors asking for a pay rise. As his demand was turned down, he left the club and reportedly professed his alleged curse. Benfica replaced him with Fernando Riera, and while the Chilean manager led the team to a third-straight European Cup final, he was unable to emulate Guttmann's success. On 22 May 1963, against Milan, Benfica's chances were slim after a harsh tackle from Gino Pivatelli severely debilitated Coluna. In a time when substitutions did not exist, Benfica played the rest of the match crippled, and two second-half goals from José Altafini sent the trophy to Italy. After a poor performance in the 1963–64 European Cup, Benfica returned to the final in the following season. Led by Romanian manager Elek Schwartz, Benfica eliminated Real Madrid 5–1 in the quarter-finals on their way to meet the holders Inter Milan in the final, played at Inter's home ground, San Siro, in a muddy and waterlogged pitch. A mistake from Alberto da Costa Pereira, allowing a shot from Jair to pass between his legs, cost Benfica their second attempt at a European Cup treble.

The following season, Benfica defeated Stade Dudelange 18–0 on aggregate, establishing a European record for biggest win on aggregate. However, in the quarter-finals, they suffered a record home defeat to Manchester United and were eliminated. After one year competing in the Inter-Cities Fairs Cup, Benfica returned to the European Cup and reached their fifth final in 1968. After eliminating Juventus 3–0 in the semi-finals, Benfica faced Manchester United at Wembley Stadium on 29 May 1968. Bobby Charlton opened the score, but Jaime Graça equalised on the 79th minute. Near the end of regular time, Eusébio squandered a one-on-one chance against Alex Stepney and the match went to extra time, where three goals in eight minutes gave the English side their first European title.

In the following season, Benfica were stopped in the quarter-finals by Johan Cruyff's Ajax after a replay played in Paris. After beating Ajax 3–1 in Amsterdam and losing by the same score in Lisbon in the return leg, Benfica were eventually eliminated after conceding three goals in extra time in the replay, held in Paris. The match is often described as a symbolic “passing of the torch”: Benfica, one of the dominant forces in European football during the 1960s, twice European Cup winners and five-time finalists, were seen as yielding the stage to the rising Ajax led by Cruyff and Rinus Michels side that would shape the following decade.

=== Competitive record ===
| Season | Competition | Round | Opponent | Home | Away | Agg. |
|---|---|---|---|---|---|---|
| 1950 | Latin Cup | MF | (Italy) Lazio | —N/a | —N/a | 3–0 |
| 1950 | Latin Cup | F | (France) Bordeaux | —N/a | —N/a | 3–3; 2–1 (replay) |
| 1955–56 | European Cup | Denied entry | | | | |
| 1956 | Latin Cup | SF | (Italy) Milan | —N/a | —N/a | 2–4 |
| 1956 | Latin Cup | 3rd/4th | (France) Nice | —N/a | —N/a | 2–1 (s.d.) |
| 1957 | Latin Cup | SF | (France) Saint-Étienne | —N/a | —N/a | 1–0 |
| 1957 | Latin Cup | F | (Spain) Real Madrid | —N/a | —N/a | 1–0 |
| 1957–58 | European Cup | PR | (Francoist Spain) Sevilla | 0–0 | 1–3 | 1–3 |
| 1960–61 | European Cup | PR | (Scotland) Heart of Midlothian | 3–0 | 2–1 | 5–1 |
| 1960–61 | European Cup | R1 | (Hungarian People's Republic) Újpest Dózsa | 6–2 | 1–2 | 7–4 |
| 1960–61 | European Cup | QF | (Denmark) AGF | 4–1 | 3–1 | 7–2 |
| 1960–61 | European Cup | SF | (Austria) Rapid Wien | 3–0 | 1–1 | 4–1 |
| 1960–61 | European Cup | F | (Francoist Spain) Barcelona | —N/a | —N/a | 3–2 |
| 1961 | Intercontinental Cup | —N/a | (Uruguay) Peñarol | 1–0 | 0–5 | 2pts–2pts (1–2 rep) |
| 1961–62 | European Cup | PR | Bye | | | |
| 1961–62 | European Cup | R1 | Austria Wien | 5–1 | 1–1 | 6–2 |
| 1961–62 | European Cup | QF | (West Germany) 1. FC Nürnberg | 6–0 | 1–3 | 7–3 |
| 1961–62 | European Cup | SF | (England) Tottenham Hotspur | 3–1 | 1–2 | 4–3 |
| 1961–62 | European Cup | F | (Francoist Spain) Real Madrid | —N/a | —N/a | 5–3 |
| 1962 | Intercontinental Cup | —N/a | (Brazil) Santos | 2–5 | 2–3 | 0pts–4pts |
| 1962–63 | European Cup | PR | Bye | | | |
| 1962–63 | European Cup | R1 | (Sweden) IFK Norrköping | 5–1 | 1–1 | 6–2 |
| 1962–63 | European Cup | QF | (Czechoslovak Socialist Republic) Dukla Prague | 2–1 | 0–0 | 2–1 |
| 1962–63 | European Cup | SF | (Netherlands) Feyenoord | 3–1 | 0–0 | 3–1 |
| 1962–63 | European Cup | F | (Italy) Milan | —N/a | —N/a | 1–2 |
| 1963–64 | European Cup | PR | (Northern Ireland) Lisburn Distillery | 5–0 | 3–3 | 8–3 |
| 1963–64 | European Cup | R1 | (West Germany) Borussia Dortmund | 2–1 | 0–5 | 2–6 |
| 1964–65 | European Cup | PR | (Luxembourg) Aris Bonnevoie | 5–1 | 5–1 | 10–2 |
| 1964–65 | European Cup | R1 | (Switzerland) La Chaux-de-Fonds | 5–0 | 1–1 | 6–1 |
| 1964–65 | European Cup | QF | (Francoist Spain) Real Madrid | 5–1 | 1–2 | 6–3 |
| 1964–65 | European Cup | SF | (Hungarian People's Republic) Győri Vasas ETO | 4–0 | 1–0 | 5–0 |
| 1964–65 | European Cup | F | (Italy) Inter Milan | —N/a | —N/a | 0–1 |
| 1965–66 | European Cup | PR | (Luxembourg) Stade Dudelange | 10–0 | 8–0 | 18–0 |
| 1965–66 | European Cup | R1 | (People's Republic of Bulgaria) Levski Sofia | 3–2 | 2–2 | 5–4 |
| 1965–66 | European Cup | QF | (England) Manchester United | 1–5 | 2–3 | 3–8 |
| 1966–67 | Inter-Cities Fairs Cup | R1 | Bye | | | |
| 1966–67 | Inter-Cities Fairs Cup | R2 | (People's Republic of Bulgaria) Spartak Plovdiv | 3–0 | 1–1 | 4–1 |
| 1966–67 | Inter-Cities Fairs Cup | R3 | (East Germany) Lokomotive Leipzig | 2–1 | 1–3 | 3–4 |
| 1967–68 | European Cup | R1 | (Northern Ireland) Glentoran | 0–0 | 1–1 | 1–1 (a) |
| 1967–68 | European Cup | R2 | (France) Saint-Étienne | 2–0 | 0–1 | 2–1 |
| 1967–68 | European Cup | QF | (Hungarian People's Republic) Vasas | 3–0 | 0–0 | 3–0 |
| 1967–68 | European Cup | SF | (Italy) Juventus | 2–0 | 1–0 | 3–0 |
| 1967–68 | European Cup | F | (England) Manchester United | —N/a | —N/a | 1–4 (a.e.t.) |
| 1968–69 | European Cup | R1 | (Iceland) Valur | 8–1 | 0–0 | 8–1 |
| 1968–69 | European Cup | R2 | Bye | | | |
| 1968–69 | European Cup | QF | (Netherlands) Ajax | 1–3 | 3–1 | 4–4 (0–3 rep) |

Note: Benfica score is always listed first.

== Transitional period ==
After a highly successful decade in the 1960s, where Benfica stood among the top contenders, the team entered a phase of renewal. With the departure of several key figures from their European triumphs, including José Augusto, Mário Coluna, Fernando Cruz and Cavém, Latin teams as a whole began to lose prominence on the European stage, as English, Dutch, and German clubs rose to dominance.

In 1969–70, Benfica were eliminated in the second round by eventual finalists Celtic, after losing 3–0 in Glasgow and winning by the same score in Lisbon. The tiebreaker was decided by a coin toss.coin toss decision.

After an early elimination from the 1970–71 Cup Winners' Cup, Benfica reached the semi-finals of the 1971–72 European Cup, defeating Feyenoord 5–1 at home in the quarter-finals. However, they were eliminated in the semi-finals by a Johan Cruyff-led Ajax, who went on to win the competition for the second consecutive year.

After two disappointing seasons, Benfica reached the quarter-finals of the 1974–75 European Cup Winners' Cup before being eliminated by another Dutch team, PSV Eindhoven, after a 2–1 home defeat.

In the mid-1970s, following the departure of several key figures such as Eusébio, Simões, Torres, and Jaime Graça, Benfica was unable to maintain the same level of European competitiveness shown in the previous decade. During this period, Benfica only reached two European Cup quarter-final presences, in 1975–76 when they lost 5–1 to the holders Bayern Munich; and in 1977–78 they were knocked out by the defending champions Liverpool with a 6–2 aggregate score.

=== Competitive record ===
| Season | Competition | Round | Opponent | Home | Away | Agg. |
|---|---|---|---|---|---|---|
| 1969–70 | European Cup | R1 | (Denmark) KB | 2–0 | 3–2 | 5–2 |
| 1969–70 | European Cup | R2 | (Scotland) Celtic | 3–0 | 0–3 | 3–3 (c) |
| 1970–71 | Cup Winners' Cup | R1 | (Socialist Federal Republic of Yugoslavia) Olimpija Ljubljana | 8–1 | 1–1 | 9–1 |
| 1970–71 | Cup Winners' Cup | R2 | (East Germany) Vorwärts Berlin | 2–0 | 0–2 (a.e.t.) | 2–2 (3–5 p) |
| 1971–72 | European Cup | R1 | (Austria) Wacker Innsbruck | 4–0 | 3–1 | 7–1 |
| 1971–72 | European Cup | R2 | (People's Republic of Bulgaria) CSKA September Flag | 2–1 | 0–0 | 2–1 |
| 1971–72 | European Cup | QF | (Netherlands) Feyenoord | 5–1 | 0–1 | 5–2 |
| 1971–72 | European Cup | SF | (Netherlands) Ajax | 0–0 | 0–1 | 0–1 |
| 1972–73 | European Cup | R1 | (Sweden) Malmö FF | 4–1 | 0–1 | 4–2 |
| 1972–73 | European Cup | R2 | (England) Derby County | 0–0 | 0–3 | 0–3 |
| 1973–74 | European Cup | R1 | (Greece) Olympiacos | 1–0 | 1–0 | 2–0 |
| 1973–74 | European Cup | R2 | (Hungarian People's Republic) Újpest Dózsa | 1–1 | 0–2 | 1–3 |
| 1974–75 | Cup Winners' Cup | R1 | (Denmark) Vanløse | 4–0 | 4–1 | 8–1 |
| 1974–75 | Cup Winners' Cup | R2 | (East Germany) Carl Zeiss Jena | 0–0 | 1–1 | 1–1 (a) |
| 1974–75 | Cup Winners' Cup | QF | (Netherlands) PSV Eindhoven | 1–2 | 0–0 | 1–2 |
| 1975–76 | European Cup | R1 | (Turkey) Fenerbahçe | 7–0 | 0–1 | 7–1 |
| 1975–76 | European Cup | R2 | (Hungarian People's Republic) Újpest Dózsa | 5–2 | 1–3 | 6–5 |
| 1975–76 | European Cup | QF | (West Germany) Bayern Munich | 0–0 | 1–5 | 1–5 |
| 1976–77 | European Cup | R1 | (East Germany) Dynamo Dresden | 0–0 | 0–2 | 0–2 |
| 1977–78 | European Cup | R1 | (Soviet Union) Torpedo Moscow | 0–0 | 0–0 (a.e.t.) | 0–0 (4–1 p) |
| 1977–78 | European Cup | R2 | (Denmark) B 1903 | 1–0 | 1–0 | 2–0 |
| 1977–78 | European Cup | QF | (England) Liverpool | 1–2 | 1–4 | 2–6 |
| 1978–79 | UEFA Cup | R1 | (France) Nantes | 0–0 | 2–0 | 2–0 |
| 1978–79 | UEFA Cup | R2 | (West Germany) Borussia Mönchengladbach | 0–0 | 0–2 | 0–2 |

Note: Benfica score is always listed first.

== European resurgence ==
In the beginning of the 1980s, Benfica's domestic dominance had dwindled, leaving the team to play in second-level competitions, namely the Cup Winners' Cup and the UEFA Cup.

In 1980–81, the team reached the Cup Winners' Cup semi-finals but lost to Carl Zeiss Jena from East Germany. This performance was improved two seasons later, as Benfica reached the 1983 UEFA Cup Final after overcoming a quarter-final bout against a Roma side featuring Falcão and Bruno Conti. In the two-legged final, Benfica faced Belgium's Anderlecht. In the first leg, on 4 May 1983, Benfica lost in Brussels with a sole goal from Kenneth Brylle. In the second leg, fourteen days later, Benfica manager Sven-Göran Eriksson chose not to start Zoran Filipović and João Alves, both undisputed starters, and the team drew 1–1, losing another European final. Benfica returned to the European Cup in the following two seasons, but defeats against Liverpool in both participations showed that the team was not yet ready to compete with Europe's best teams.

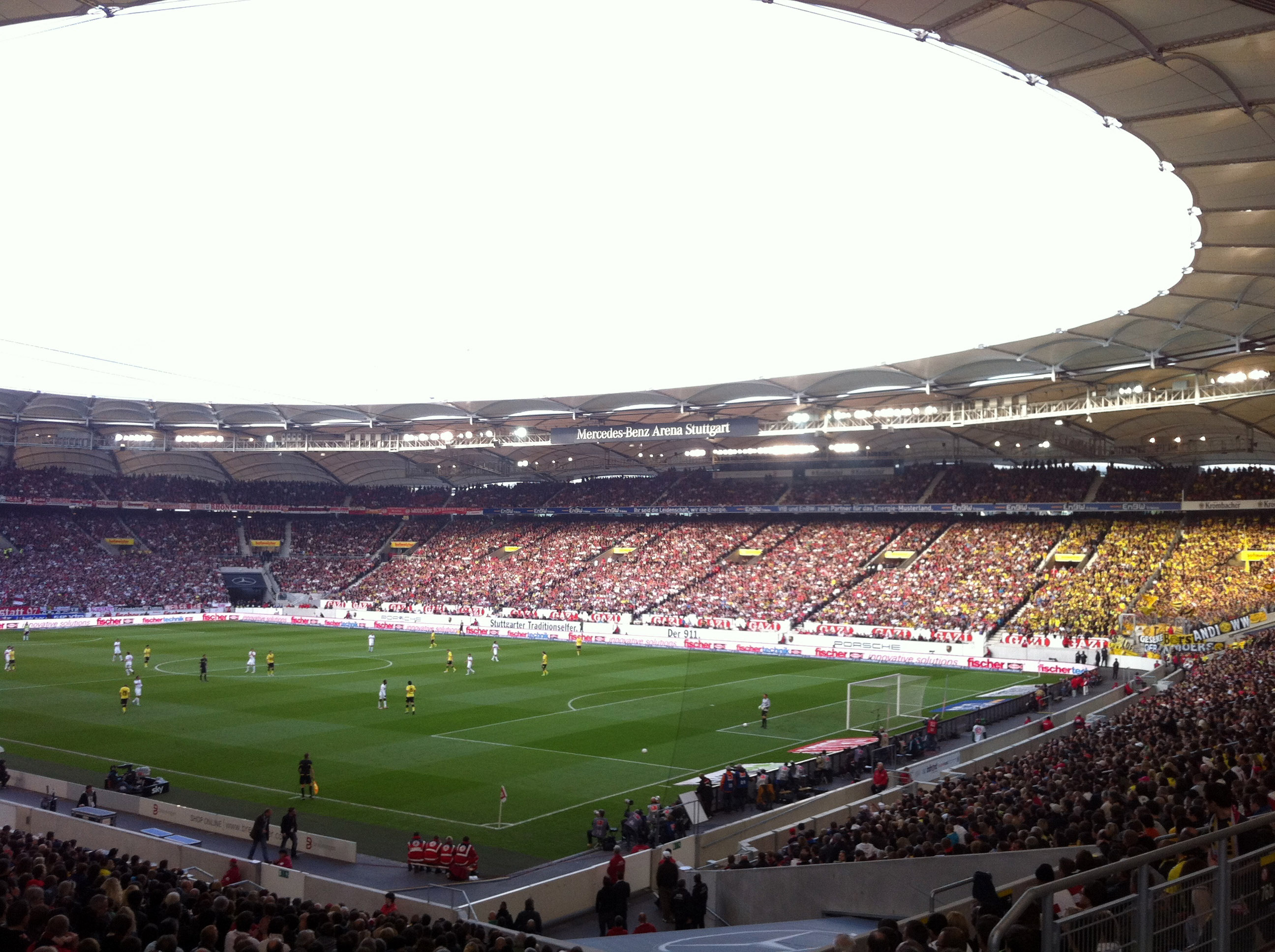
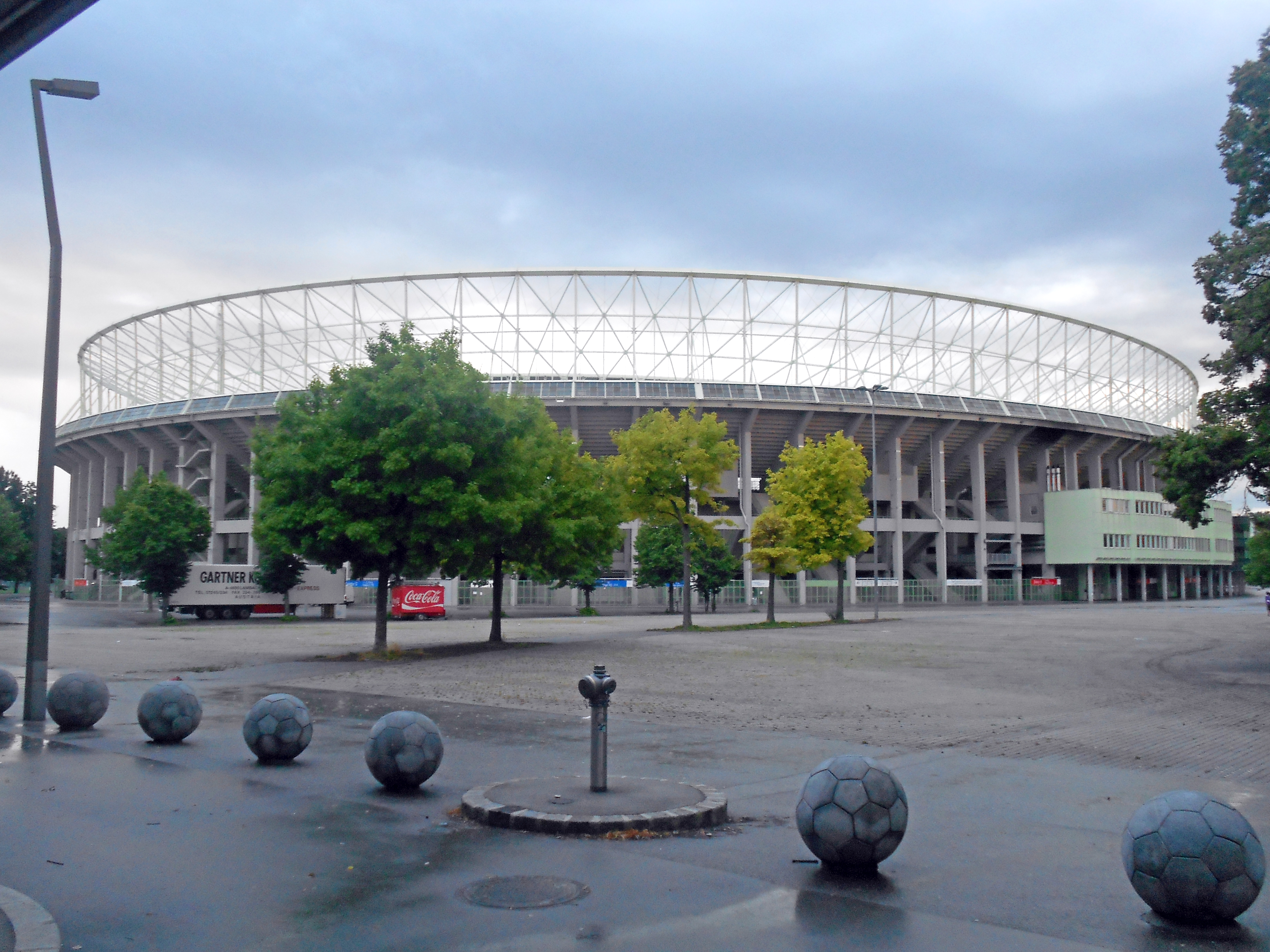
Mercedes-Benz Arena (former Neckarstadion) and Ernst-Happel-Stadion (former Praterstadion)

After two unsuccessful seasons, Benfica returned to the European Cup, reaching the final. After getting revenge on Anderlecht in the quarter-finals, Benfica defeated Steaua București in the semi-finals, advancing to their sixth final in the competition, where they met PSV in a match played at Stuttgart's Neckarstadion on 25 May 1988. Following a goalless draw at the end of extra time, the match was decided by a penalty shoot-out. The Dutch side, fielding five Netherlands national team players that would go on to conquer the UEFA Euro 1988 a month later, converted all of their penalty kicks, whereas António Veloso allowed goalkeeper Hans van Breukelen to defend his penalty kick, and sealed Benfica's fourth consecutive European Cup final loss.

Two years later, Benfica returned to a European Cup final, again under the command of Sven-Göran Eriksson, with a team that included Brazilian internationals Ricardo Gomes and Aldair, and midfielders Valdo and Jonas Thern. The club eliminated Marseille in the semi-finals with a controversial goal by Vata, reaching its seventh European Cup final. Before the final, Eusébio visited Béla Guttmann's grave in a symbolic attempt to break the supposed "curse". On May 23, 1990, in Vienna, Benfica faced the reigning European champion Milan at the Praterstadion, but could not prevent Frank Rijkaard's solitary goal, which gave the Italian team its second consecutive title in the competition.

In 1991–92, Benfica took part in the last edition of the European Cup before being reformulated and converted into the UEFA Champions League. They reached the tournament's group stage after beating the English champion Arsenal, in Highbury, with Isaías and Vasili Kulkov scoring in extra time. In the group stage, Benfica ended in third place, behind Barcelona and Sparta Prague, being eliminated after losing to the Catalans in the last and decisive game. In 1992–93, Benfica reached the quarter-finals of the UEFA Cup, beating eventual winners Juventus at home (their only loss in the competition), but losing 3–0 in Turin.

The following season, Benfica returned to the Cup Winners' Cup and reached the semi-finals after a 5–5 aggregate draw against Bayer Leverkusen in the quarter-finals, advancing on the away goals rule. In the first leg of the semi-finals, played at the Estádio da Luz in Lisbon, Benfica defeated Parma 2–1, despite Vítor Paneira missing a penalty. However, in the return leg, centre-back Carlos Mozer was sent off on the 20th minute and the team resisted for 55 minutes before Roberto Sensini scored the only goal of the match, which put the Italians through. In the 1994–95, in Benfica made its debut in the reformulated Champions League, winning its group but falling to title holders Milan in the quarter-finals.

=== Competitive record ===
| Season | Competition | Round | Opponent | Home | Away | Agg. |
|---|---|---|---|---|---|---|
| 1979–80 | UEFA Cup | R1 | (Greece) Aris | 2–1 | 1–3 | 3–4 |
| 1980–81 | Cup Winners' Cup | PR | (Turkey) Altay | 4–0 | 0–0 | 4–0 |
| 1980–81 | Cup Winners' Cup | R1 | (Socialist Federal Republic of Yugoslavia) Dinamo Zagreb | 2–0 | 0–0 | 2–0 |
| 1980–81 | Cup Winners' Cup | R2 | (Sweden) Malmö FF | 2–0 | 0–1 | 2–1 |
| 1980–81 | Cup Winners' Cup | QF | (West Germany) Fortuna Düsseldorf | 1–0 | 2–2 | 3–2 |
| 1980–81 | Cup Winners' Cup | SF | (East Germany) Carl Zeiss Jena | 1–0 | 0–2 | 1–2 |
| 1981–82 | European Cup | R1 | (Cyprus) Omonia | 3–0 | 1–0 | 4–0 |
| 1981–82 | European Cup | R2 | (West Germany) Bayern Munich | 0–0 | 1–4 | 1–4 |
| 1982–83 | UEFA Cup | R1 | (Spain) Real Betis | 2–1 | 2–1 | 4–2 |
| 1982–83 | UEFA Cup | R2 | (Belgium) Lokeren | 2–0 | 2–1 | 4–1 |
| 1982–83 | UEFA Cup | R3 | (Switzerland) Zürich | 4–0 | 1–1 | 5–1 |
| 1982–83 | UEFA Cup | QF | (Italy) Roma | 1–1 | 2–1 | 3–2 |
| 1982–83 | UEFA Cup | SF | (Socialist Republic of Romania) Universitatea Craiova | 0–0 | 1–1 | 1–1 (a) |
| 1982–83 | UEFA Cup | F | (Belgium) Anderlecht | 1–1 | 0–1 | 1–2 |
| 1983–84 | European Cup | R1 | (Northern Ireland) Linfield | 3–0 | 3–2 | 6–2 |
| 1983–84 | European Cup | R2 | (Greece) Olympiacos | 3–0 | 0–1 | 3–1 |
| 1983–84 | European Cup | QF | (England) Liverpool | 1–4 | 0–1 | 1–5 |
| 1984–85 | European Cup | R1 | (Socialist Federal Republic of Yugoslavia) Red Star Belgrade | 2–0 | 2–3 | 4–3 |
| 1984–85 | European Cup | R2 | (England) Liverpool | 1–0 | 1–3 | 2–3 |
| 1985–86 | Cup Winners' Cup | R1 | (England) Manchester United | Bye (Note: English teams were banned due to the Heysel Stadium Disaster.) | | |
| 1985–86 | Cup Winners' Cup | R2 | (Italy) Sampdoria | 2–0 | 0–1 | 2–1 |
| 1985–86 | Cup Winners' Cup | QF | (Czechoslovak Socialist Republic) Dukla Prague | 2–1 | 0–1 | 2–2 (a) |
| 1986–87 | Cup Winners' Cup | R1 | (Norway) Lillestrøm | 2–0 | 2–1 | 4–1 |
| 1986–87 | Cup Winners' Cup | R2 | (France) Bordeaux | 1–1 | 0–1 | 1–2 |
| 1987–88 | European Cup | R1 | (People's Socialist Republic of Albania) Partizani Tirana | 4–0 | Bye (Note: Partizani were disqualified due to the behaviour of their players and officials, having four players sent off in their first leg match. Benfica qualified on a walkover.) | 4–0 |
| 1987–88 | European Cup | R2 | (Denmark) AGF Aarhus | 1–0 | 0–0 | 1–0 |
| 1987–88 | European Cup | QF | (Belgium) Anderlecht | 2–0 | 0–1 | 2–1 |
| 1987–88 | European Cup | SF | (Socialist Republic of Romania) Steaua București | 2–0 | 0–0 | 2–0 |
| 1987–88 | European Cup | F | (Netherlands) PSV Eindhoven | —N/a | —N/a | 0–0 (a.e.t.) (5–6 p) |
| 1988–89 | UEFA Cup | R1 | (France) Montpellier | 3–0 | 3–1 | 6–1 |
| 1988–89 | UEFA Cup | R2 | (Belgium) Liège | 1–1 | 1–2 | 2–3 |
| 1989–90 | European Cup | R1 | (Republic of Ireland) Derry City | 4–0 | 2–1 | 6–1 |
| 1989–90 | European Cup | R2 | (Hungarian People's Republic) Budapest Honvéd | 7–0 | 2–0 | 9–0 |
| 1989–90 | European Cup | QF | (Soviet Union) Dnipro Dnipropetrovsk | 1–0 | 3–0 | 4–0 |
| 1989–90 | European Cup | SF | (France) Marseille | 1–0 | 1–2 | 2–2 (a) |
| 1989–90 | European Cup | F | (Italy) Milan | —N/a | —N/a | 0–1 |
| 1990–91 | UEFA Cup | R1 | (Italy) Roma | 0–1 | 0–1 | 0–2 |
| 1991–92 | European Cup | R1 | (Malta) Ħamrun Spartans | 4–0 | 6–0 | 10–0 |
| 1991–92 | European Cup | R2 | (England) Arsenal | 1–1 | 3–1 (a.e.t.) | 4–2 |
| 1991–92 | European Cup | GS | (Soviet Union) Dynamo Kyiv | 5–0 | 0–1 | 3rd |
| 1991–92 | European Cup | GS | (Spain) Barcelona | 0–0 | 1–2 | 3rd |
| 1991–92 | European Cup | GS | (Czechoslovakia) Sparta Prague | 1–1 | 1–1 | 3rd |
| 1992–93 | UEFA Cup | R1 | (Slovenia) Izola | 3–0 | 5–0 | 7–0 |
| 1992–93 | UEFA Cup | R2 | (Hungary) Váci Izzó | 5–1 | 1–0 | 6–1 |
| 1992–93 | UEFA Cup | R3 | (Russia) Dynamo Moscow | 2–0 | 2–2 | 4–2 |
| 1992–93 | UEFA Cup | QF | (Italy) Juventus | 2–1 | 0–3 | 2–4 |
| 1993–94 | Cup Winners' Cup | R1 | (Poland) GKS Katowice | 1–0 | 1–1 | 2–1 |
| 1993–94 | Cup Winners' Cup | R2 | (Bulgaria) CSKA Sofia | 3–1 | 3–1 | 6–2 |
| 1993–94 | Cup Winners' Cup | QF | (Germany) Bayer Leverkusen | 1–1 | 4–4 | 5–5 (a) |
| 1993–94 | Cup Winners' Cup | SF | (Italy) Parma | 2–1 | 0–1 | 2–2 (a) |
| 1994–95 | UEFA Champions League | GS | (Croatia) Hajduk Split | 2–1 | 0–0 | 1st |
| 1994–95 | UEFA Champions League | GS | (Belgium) Anderlecht | 3–1 | 1–1 | 1st |
| 1994–95 | UEFA Champions League | GS | (Romania) Steaua București | 2–1 | 1–1 | 1st |
| 1994–95 | UEFA Champions League | QF | (Italy) Milan | 0–0 | 0–2 | 0–2 |

Note: Benfica score is always listed first.

== European decline ==
In the late 1990s, the club's European performances did not match Benfica's historic record, with only a quarter-final presence in the 1996–97 UEFA Cup Winners' Cup as a highlight. The team's performances were subpar, with their lowest peak coming in the form of a 7–0 loss against Celta Vigo, Benfica's heaviest European defeat.

After missing two seasons of European football for the first time since 1959–60, Benfica returned to UEFA competitions in 2003–04. They entered that season's Champions League in the third qualifying round, but defeats against Lazio demoted them to the UEFA Cup. There, the team played its first European match at the new Estádio da Luz (3–1 win against Molde) and reached the fourth round, where they were eliminated by Inter Milan with a 4–3 away loss.

After another season without playing in the Champions League, Benfica returned to UEFA's main competition in 2005–06, where they achieved their best performance in eleven years. Benfica knocked Manchester United out of the competition in the group stage, beating them 2–1 at home, and by winning both ties, eliminated the title holders Liverpool in the following round, grabbing the club's first-ever win in Anfield. In the quarter-finals, Benfica were eliminated by Barcelona after a 2–0 loss at Camp Nou.

The next two seasons were fairly similar; in 2006–07 and 2007–08, Benfica finished third in the group stage and were demoted to the UEFA Cup, where they reached the quarter-finals.

=== Competitive record ===
| Season | Competition | Round | Opponent | Home | Away | Agg. |
|---|---|---|---|---|---|---|
| 1995–96 | UEFA Cup | R1 | (Belgium) Lierse | 2–1 | 3–1 | 5–2 |
| 1995–96 | UEFA Cup | R2 | (Netherlands) Roda JC | 1–0 | 2–2 | 3–2 |
| 1995–96 | UEFA Cup | R3 | (Germany) Bayern Munich | 1–3 | 1–4 | 2–7 |
| 1996–97 | UEFA Cup Winners' Cup | R1 | (Poland) Ruch Chorzów | 5–1 | 0–0 | 5–1 |
| 1996–97 | UEFA Cup Winners' Cup | R2 | (Russia) Lokomotiv Moscow | 1–0 | 3–2 | 4–2 |
| 1996–97 | UEFA Cup Winners' Cup | QF | (Italy) Fiorentina | 0–2 | 1–0 | 1–2 |
| 1997–98 | UEFA Cup | R1 | (France) Bastia | 0–0 | 0–1 | 0–1 |
| 1998–99 | UEFA Champions League | QR2 | (Israel) Beitar Jerusalem | 6–0 | 2–4 | 8–4 |
| 1998–99 | UEFA Champions League | GS | (Germany) 1. FC Kaiserslautern | 2–1 | 0–1 | 2nd |
| 1998–99 | UEFA Champions League | GS | (Netherlands) PSV Eindhoven | 2–1 | 2–2 | 2nd |
| 1998–99 | UEFA Champions League | GS | (Finland) HJK Helsinki | 2–2 | 0–2 | 2nd |
| 1999–2000 | UEFA Cup | R1 | (Romania) Dinamo București | 0–1 | 2–0 | 2–1 |
| 1999–2000 | UEFA Cup | R2 | (Greece) PAOK | 1–2 (a.e.t.) | 2–1 | 3–3 (4–1 p) |
| 1999–2000 | UEFA Cup | R3 | (Spain) Celta Vigo | 1–1 | 0–7 | 1–8 |
| 2000–01 | UEFA Cup | R1 | (Sweden) Halmstad | 2–2 | 1–2 | 3–4 |
| 2003–04 | UEFA Champions League | QR3 | (Italy) Lazio | 0–1 (Note: Due to UEFA not approving the Estádio Nacional (Benfica's temporary home) for European competitions, the match was played at the Estádio do Bessa.) | 1–3 | 1–4 |
| 2003–04 | UEFA Cup | R1 | (Belgium) La Louvière | 1–0 | 1–1 | 2–1 |
| 2003–04 | UEFA Cup | R2 | (Norway) Molde | 3–1 | 2–0 | 5–1 |
| 2003–04 | UEFA Cup | R3 | (Norway) Rosenborg | 1–0 | 1–2 | 2–2 (a) |
| 2003–04 | UEFA Cup | R4 | (Italy) Inter Milan | 0–0 | 3–4 | 3–4 |
| 2004–05 | UEFA Champions League | QR3 | (Belgium) Anderlecht | 1–0 | 0–3 | 1–3 |
| 2004–05 | UEFA Cup | R1 | (Slovakia) Dukla Banská Bystrica | 2–0 | 3–0 | 5–0 |
| 2004–05 | UEFA Cup | GS | (Netherlands) Heerenveen | 4–2 | —N/a | 2nd |
| 2004–05 | UEFA Cup | GS | (Germany) VfB Stuttgart | —N/a | 0–3 | 2nd |
| 2004–05 | UEFA Cup | GS | (Croatia) Dinamo Zagreb | 2–0 | —N/a | 2nd |
| 2004–05 | UEFA Cup | GS | (Belgium) Beveren | —N/a | 3–0 | 2nd |
| 2004–05 | UEFA Cup | R32 | (Russia) CSKA Moscow | 1–1 | 0–2 | 1–3 |
| 2005–06 | UEFA Champions League | GS | (France) Lille | 1–0 | 0–0 | 2nd |
| 2005–06 | UEFA Champions League | GS | (England) Manchester United | 2–1 | 1–2 | 2nd |
| 2005–06 | UEFA Champions League | GS | (Spain) Villarreal | 0–1 | 1–1 | 2nd |
| 2005–06 | UEFA Champions League | R16 | (England) Liverpool | 1–0 | 2–0 | 3–0 |
| 2005–06 | UEFA Champions League | QF | (Spain) Barcelona | 0–0 | 0–2 | 0–2 |
| 2006–07 | UEFA Champions League | QR3 | Austria Wien | 3–1 | 0–0 | 4–1 |
| 2006–07 | UEFA Champions League | GS | (Denmark) Copenhagen | 3–1 | 0–0 | 3rd |
| 2006–07 | UEFA Champions League | GS | (England) Manchester United | 0–1 | 1–3 | 3rd |
| 2006–07 | UEFA Champions League | GS | (Scotland) Celtic | 3–0 | 0–3 | 3rd |
| 2006–07 | UEFA Cup | R32 | (Romania) Dinamo București | 1–0 | 2–1 | 3–1 |
| 2006–07 | UEFA Cup | R16 | (France) Paris Saint-Germain | 3–1 | 1–2 | 4–3 |
| 2006–07 | UEFA Cup | QF | (Spain) Espanyol | 0–0 | 2–3 | 2–3 |
| 2007–08 | UEFA Champions League | QR3 | (Denmark) Copenhagen | 2–1 | 1–0 | 3–1 |
| 2007–08 | UEFA Champions League | GS | (Italy) Milan | 1–1 | 1–2 | 3rd |
| 2007–08 | UEFA Champions League | GS | (Ukraine) Shakhtar Donetsk | 0–1 | 2–1 | 3rd |
| 2007–08 | UEFA Champions League | GS | (Scotland) Celtic | 1–0 | 0–1 | 3rd |
| 2007–08 | UEFA Cup | R32 | (Germany) 1. FC Nürnberg | 1–0 | 2–2 | 3–2 |
| 2007–08 | UEFA Cup | R16 | (Spain) Getafe | 1–2 | 0–1 | 1–3 |
| 2008–09 | UEFA Cup | R1 | (Italy) Napoli | 2–0 | 2–3 | 4–3 |
| 2008–09 | UEFA Cup | GS | (Germany) Hertha BSC | —N/a | 1–1 | 5th |
| 2008–09 | UEFA Cup | GS | (Turkey) Galatasaray | 0–2 | —N/a | 5th |
| 2008–09 | UEFA Cup | GS | (Greece) Olympiacos | —N/a | 1–5 | 5th |
| 2008–09 | UEFA Cup | GS | (Ukraine) Metalist Kharkiv | 0–1 | —N/a | 5th |

Note: Benfica score is always listed first.

== European reaffirmation ==
In 2009–10, Benfica had a noteworthy run in the newly created UEFA Europa League, progressing all the way from the play-off round to the quarter-finals. The campaign featured five wins in six group stage matches, most notably a 5–0 thrashing of English side Everton in the group stage and an aggregate 3–2 win against Marseille in the round of 16. The following season, Benfica returned to the Champions League, but as in 2006–07 and 2007–08, they were demoted to the Europa League. This time, however, the team overcame the quarter-final stage to reach their first European semi-final in 17 years. In the first ever European match between Portuguese teams, Benfica were surprised by Braga and missed the chance to qualify to the final.

Benfica improved their European performance in the 2011–12 Champions League, progressing all the way to the quarter-finals. In the group stage, Benfica topped their group, knocking Manchester United out of European competitions once again, defeated Zenit Saint Petersbourg in the last 16 but lost 3–1 on aggregate to eventual winners Chelsea in the quarter-finals.

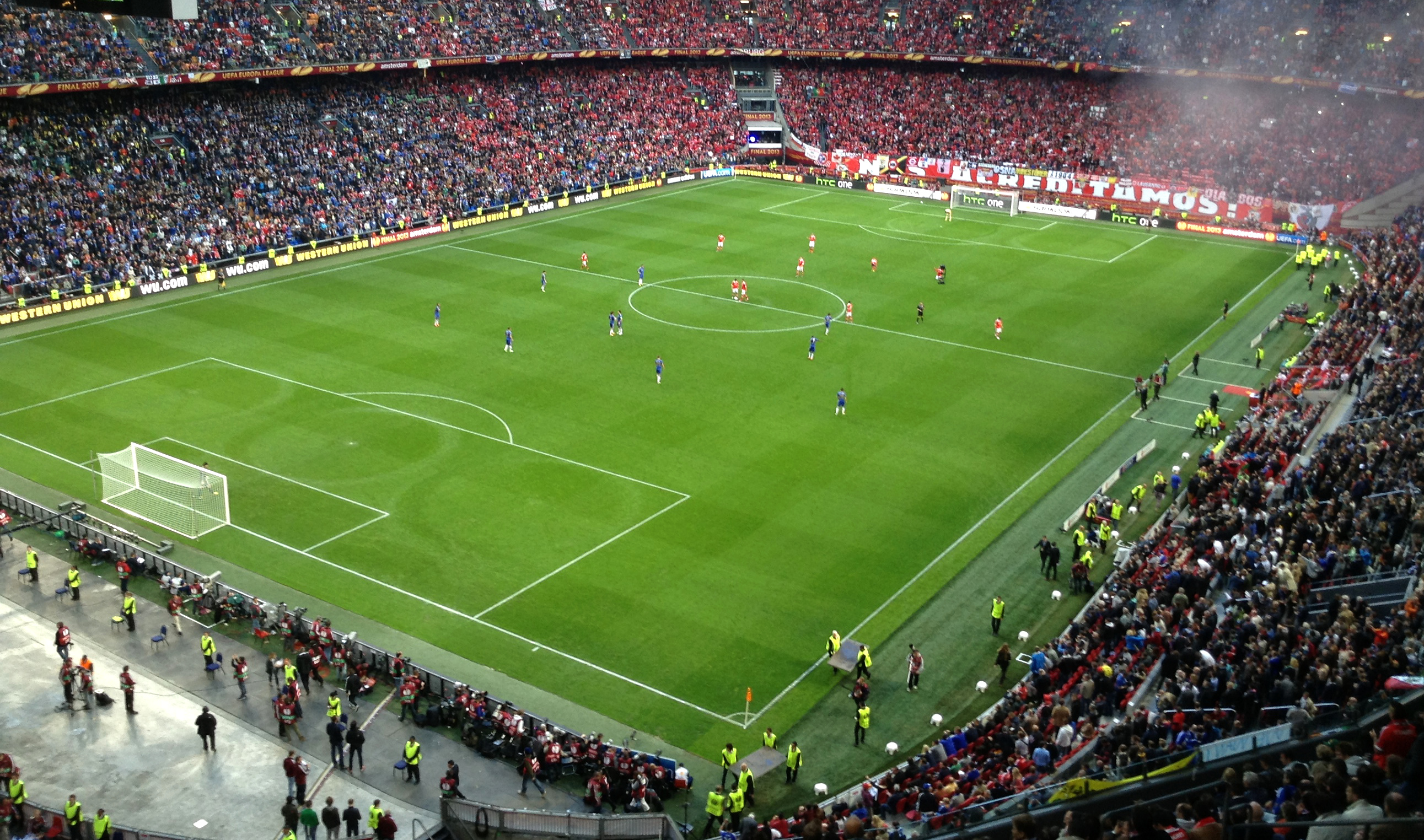
Benfica faced Chelsea in the 2013 UEFA Europa League Final, played at the Amsterdam Arena.

In the 2012–13 and 2013–14 seasons, Benfica's run in the Champions League was not so successful, but the club managed to reach two Europa League finals, the first of them 23 years after their last appearance in a European final. Benfica lost the first final on 17 May 2013 to then Champions League holders Chelsea, with a 2–1 injury-time header from Branislav Ivanović, and drew 0–0 against Sevilla on 15 May 2014, losing the match penalty shoot-out 4–2. This extended the club's run of European finals unsuccesses to eight, in a total of ten finals, a domestic record that ranked them seventh among UEFA clubs with most finals, in 2014.

In the mid-2010s, Benfica reached the Champions League knockout stage twice in a row, the first time since the competition was revamped. They qualified to the quarter-finals for an eighteenth time in 2015–16, where they lost 3–2 on aggregate to Bayern Munich, and were eliminated by Borussia Dortmund in the round of 16 in 2016–17.

The following seasons, Benfica did not advance to the later stages of UEFA's main tournament. In 2017–18, the club set the worst ever performance by a Portuguese team in the competition's group stage, with 6 losses and a negative goal difference of 13, including a 5–0 loss to Basel, equaling their previous biggest loss in the competition, against Borussia Dortmund in 1963–64. In 2018–19, they were eliminated once again in the Champions League group stage, eventually reaching the Europa League quarter-finals.

=== Competitive record ===
| Season | Competition | Round | Opponent | Home | Away | Agg. |
|---|---|---|---|---|---|---|
| 2009–10 | UEFA Europa League | PO | (Ukraine) Vorskla Poltava | 4–0 | 1–2 | 5–2 |
| 2009–10 | UEFA Europa League | GS | (Belarus) BATE Borisov | 2–0 | 2–1 | 1st |
| 2009–10 | UEFA Europa League | GS | (Greece) AEK Athens | 2–1 | 0–1 | 1st |
| 2009–10 | UEFA Europa League | GS | (England) Everton | 5–0 | 2–0 | 1st |
| 2009–10 | UEFA Europa League | R32 | (Germany) Hertha BSC | 4–0 | 1–1 | 5–1 |
| 2009–10 | UEFA Europa League | R16 | (France) Marseille | 1–1 | 2–1 | 3–2 |
| 2009–10 | UEFA Europa League | QF | (England) Liverpool | 2–1 | 1–4 | 3–5 |
| 2010–11 | UEFA Champions League | GS | (Israel) Hapoel Tel Aviv | 2–0 | 0–3 | 3rd |
| 2010–11 | UEFA Champions League | GS | (Germany) Schalke 04 | 1–2 | 0–2 | 3rd |
| 2010–11 | UEFA Champions League | GS | (France) Lyon | 4–3 | 0–2 | 3rd |
| 2010–11 | UEFA Europa League | R32 | (Germany) VfB Stuttgart | 2–1 | 2–0 | 4–1 |
| 2010–11 | UEFA Europa League | R16 | (France) Paris Saint-Germain | 2–1 | 1–1 | 3–2 |
| 2010–11 | UEFA Europa League | QF | (Netherlands) PSV Eindhoven | 4–1 | 2–2 | 6–3 |
| 2010–11 | UEFA Europa League | SF | (Portugal) Braga | 2–1 | 0–1 | 2–2 (a) |
| 2011–12 | UEFA Champions League | QR3 | (Turkey) Trabzonspor | 2–0 | 1–1 | 3–1 |
| 2011–12 | UEFA Champions League | PO | (Netherlands) Twente | 3–1 | 2–2 | 5–3 |
| 2011–12 | UEFA Champions League | GS | (England) Manchester United | 1–1 | 2–2 | 1st |
| 2011–12 | UEFA Champions League | GS | (Romania) Oțelul Galați | 1–0 | 1–0 | 1st |
| 2011–12 | UEFA Champions League | GS | (Switzerland) Basel | 1–1 | 2–0 | 1st |
| 2011–12 | UEFA Champions League | R16 | (Russia) Zenit Saint Petersburg | 2–0 | 2–3 | 4–3 |
| 2011–12 | UEFA Champions League | QF | (England) Chelsea | 0–1 | 1–2 | 1–3 |
| 2012–13 | UEFA Champions League | GS | (Scotland) Celtic | 2–1 | 0–0 | 3rd |
| 2012–13 | UEFA Champions League | GS | (Spain) Barcelona | 0–2 | 0–0 | 3rd |
| 2012–13 | UEFA Champions League | GS | (Russia) Spartak Moscow | 2–0 | 1–2 | 3rd |
| 2012–13 | UEFA Europa League | R32 | (Germany) Bayer Leverkusen | 2–1 | 1–0 | 3–1 |
| 2012–13 | UEFA Europa League | R16 | (France) Bordeaux | 1–0 | 3–2 | 4–2 |
| 2012–13 | UEFA Europa League | QF | (England) Newcastle United | 3–1 | 1–1 | 4–2 |
| 2012–13 | UEFA Europa League | SF | (Turkey) Fenerbahçe | 3–1 | 0–1 | 3–2 |
| 2012–13 | UEFA Europa League | F | (England) Chelsea | —N/a | —N/a | 1–2 |
| 2013–14 | UEFA Champions League | GS | (Belgium) Anderlecht | 2–0 | 3–2 | 3rd |
| 2013–14 | UEFA Champions League | GS | (France) Paris Saint-Germain | 2–1 | 0–3 | 3rd |
| 2013–14 | UEFA Champions League | GS | (Greece) Olympiacos | 1–1 | 0–1 | 3rd |
| 2013–14 | UEFA Europa League | R32 | (Greece) PAOK | 3–0 | 1–0 | 4–0 |
| 2013–14 | UEFA Europa League | R16 | (England) Tottenham Hotspur | 2–2 | 3–1 | 5–3 |
| 2013–14 | UEFA Europa League | QF | (Netherlands) AZ | 2–0 | 1–0 | 3–0 |
| 2013–14 | UEFA Europa League | SF | (Italy) Juventus | 2–1 | 0–0 | 2–1 |
| 2013–14 | UEFA Europa League | F | (Spain) Sevilla | —N/a | —N/a | 0–0 (a.e.t.) (2–4 p) |
| 2014–15 | UEFA Champions League | GS | (Russia) Zenit Saint Petersburg | 0–2 | 0–1 | 4th |
| 2014–15 | UEFA Champions League | GS | (Germany) Bayer Leverkusen | 0–0 | 1–3 | 4th |
| 2014–15 | UEFA Champions League | GS | (France) Monaco | 1–0 | 0–0 | 4th |
| 2015–16 | UEFA Champions League | GS | (Kazakhstan) Astana | 2–0 | 2–2 | 2nd |
| 2015–16 | UEFA Champions League | GS | (Spain) Atlético Madrid | 1–2 | 2–1 | 2nd |
| 2015–16 | UEFA Champions League | GS | (Turkey) Galatasaray | 2–1 | 1–2 | 2nd |
| 2015–16 | UEFA Champions League | R16 | (Russia) Zenit Saint Petersburg | 1–0 | 2–1 | 3–1 |
| 2015–16 | UEFA Champions League | QF | (Germany) Bayern Munich | 2–2 | 0–1 | 2–3 |
| 2016–17 | UEFA Champions League | GS | (Turkey) Beşiktaş | 1–1 | 3–3 | 2nd |
| 2016–17 | UEFA Champions League | GS | (Italy) Napoli | 1–2 | 2–4 | 2nd |
| 2016–17 | UEFA Champions League | GS | (Ukraine) Dynamo Kyiv | 1–0 | 2–0 | 2nd |
| 2016–17 | UEFA Champions League | R16 | (Germany) Borussia Dortmund | 1–0 | 0–4 | 1–4 |
| 2017–18 | UEFA Champions League | GS | (Russia) CSKA Moscow | 1–2 | 0–2 | 4th |
| 2017–18 | UEFA Champions League | GS | (Switzerland) Basel | 0–2 | 0–5 | 4th |
| 2017–18 | UEFA Champions League | GS | (England) Manchester United | 0–1 | 0–2 | 4th |
| 2018–19 | UEFA Champions League | QR3 | (Turkey) Fenerbahçe | 1–0 | 1–1 | 2–1 |
| 2018–19 | UEFA Champions League | PO | (Greece) PAOK | 1–1 | 4–1 | 5–2 |
| 2018–19 | UEFA Champions League | GS | (Germany) Bayern Munich | 0–2 | 1–5 | 3rd |
| 2018–19 | UEFA Champions League | GS | (Greece) AEK Athens | 1–0 | 3–2 | 3rd |
| 2018–19 | UEFA Champions League | GS | (Netherlands) Ajax | 1–1 | 0–1 | 3rd |
| 2018–19 | UEFA Europa League | R32 | (Turkey) Galatasaray | 0–0 | 2–1 | 2–1 |
| 2018–19 | UEFA Europa League | R16 | (Croatia) Dinamo Zagreb | 3–0 (a.e.t.) | 0–1 | 3–1 |
| 2018–19 | UEFA Europa League | QF | (Germany) Eintracht Frankfurt | 4–2 | 0–2 | 4–4 (a) |

Note: Benfica score is always listed first.

== Current European landscape ==
After another elimination in the 2019–20 Champions League group stage and an early exit from the Europa League, Benfica, again managed by Jorge Jesus, missed out on qualifying for the Champions League group stage for the first time in ten years.

In the following season, the club once again excelled in the Champions League, advancing past the group stage for the first time in four years by eliminating Barcelona, whom they defeated 3–0 in Lisbon. In the round of 16 against Ajax, Benfica drew 2–2 at home and won 1–0 in the Johan Cruijff Arena, reaching the quarter-finals for the first time in five years, where they were eliminated by Liverpool, drawing 3–3 in the second leg at Anfield. In 2022–23, Benfica finished first in their Champions League group, twice beating and eliminating Juventus along the way. The team again advanced to the quarter-finals, but were knocked out by Inter Milan, once again drawing 3–3 away in the return leg.

In the 2023–24 season, Benfica failed to repeat the success of previous seasons, being eliminated in the Champions League group stage and transferred to the Europa League. In the secondary competition, they reached the quarter-finals, but after a victory in Lisbon, they were eliminated in the second leg on penalties by Marseille. In the following season, already in the new Champions League league format, Benfica adapted well, winning four and drawing one of its eight games. Highlights included a 4–0 home win over Atlético Madrid, and away wins against Juventus and Monaco. In the round of 16, after beating Monaco in the play-offs round, Benfica were knocked out by Barcelona.

In 2025, Benfica made its debut in the new FIFA Club World Cup, finishing first in its group after a 2–2 draw with Boca Juniors, a 6–0 win over Auckland City and a historic 1–0 victory against Bayern Munich, the club's first ever win over the German giants. In the round of 16, Benfica were eliminated, 4–1 after extra time, by the eventual winner Chelsea.

=== Competitive record ===
| Season | Competition | Round | Opponent | Home | Away | Agg. |
|---|---|---|---|---|---|---|
| 2019–20 | UEFA Champions League | GS | (Germany) RB Leipzig | 1–2 | 2–2 | 3rd |
| 2019–20 | UEFA Champions League | GS | (Russia) Zenit Saint Petersburg | 3–0 | 1–3 | 3rd |
| 2019–20 | UEFA Champions League | GS | (France) Lyon | 2–1 | 1–3 | 3rd |
| 2019–20 | UEFA Europa League | R32 | (Ukraine) Shakhtar Donetsk | 3–3 | 1–2 | 4–5 |
| 2020–21 | UEFA Champions League | QR3 | (Greece) PAOK | —N/a | 1–2 (Note: The match was played as a one-legged tie in Thessaloniki due to the impact of the COVID-19 pandemic.) | —N/a |
| 2020–21 | UEFA Europa League | GS | (Belgium) Standard Liège | 3–0 | 2–2 | 2nd |
| 2020–21 | UEFA Europa League | GS | (Scotland) Rangers | 3–3 | 2–2 | 2nd |
| 2020–21 | UEFA Europa League | GS | (Poland) Lech Poznań | 4–0 | 4–2 | 2nd |
| 2020–21 | UEFA Europa League | R32 | (England) Arsenal | 1–1 (Note: The match was moved to Stadio Olimpico in Rome, due to restrictions imposed by Portugal on travelers from the United Kingdom out of concern of the COVID-19 variant B.1.1.7.) | 2–3 (Note: The match was moved to Karaiskakis Stadium in Piraeus, due to restrictions imposed by the United Kingdom on travelers from Portugal.) | 3–4 |
| 2021–22 | UEFA Champions League | QR3 | (Russia) Spartak Moscow | 2–0 | 2–0 | 4–0 |
| 2021–22 | UEFA Champions League | PO | (Netherlands) PSV Eindhoven | 2–1 | 0–0 | 2–1 |
| 2021–22 | UEFA Champions League | GS | (Ukraine) Dynamo Kyiv | 2–0 | 0–0 | 2nd |
| 2021–22 | UEFA Champions League | GS | (Spain) Barcelona | 3–0 | 0–0 | 2nd |
| 2021–22 | UEFA Champions League | GS | (Germany) Bayern Munich | 0–4 | 2–5 | 2nd |
| 2021–22 | UEFA Champions League | R16 | (Netherlands) Ajax | 2–2 | 1–0 | 3–2 |
| 2021–22 | UEFA Champions League | QF | (England) Liverpool | 1–3 | 3–3 | 4–6 |
| 2022–23 | UEFA Champions League | QR3 | (Denmark) Midtjylland | 4–1 | 3–1 | 7−2 |
| 2022–23 | UEFA Champions League | PO | (Ukraine) Dynamo Kyiv | 3–0 | 2–0 | 5−0 |
| 2022–23 | UEFA Champions League | GS | (Israel) Maccabi Haifa | 2–0 | 6–1 | 1st |
| 2022–23 | UEFA Champions League | GS | (Italy) Juventus | 4–3 | 2–1 | 1st |
| 2022–23 | UEFA Champions League | GS | (France) Paris Saint-Germain | 1–1 | 1–1 | 1st |
| 2022–23 | UEFA Champions League | R16 | (Belgium) Club Brugge | 5–1 | 2–0 | 7–1 |
| 2022–23 | UEFA Champions League | QF | (Italy) Inter Milan | 0–2 | 3–3 | 3–5 |
| 2023–24 | UEFA Champions League | GS | (Austria) Red Bull Salzburg | 0–2 | 3–1 | 3rd |
| 2023–24 | UEFA Champions League | GS | (Italy) Inter Milan | 3–3 | 0–1 | 3rd |
| 2023–24 | UEFA Champions League | GS | (Spain) Real Sociedad | 0–1 | 1–3 | 3rd |
| 2023–24 | UEFA Europa League | KPO | (France) Toulouse | 2–1 | 0–0 | 2–1 |
| 2023–24 | UEFA Europa League | R16 | (Scotland) Rangers | 2–2 | 1–0 | 3–2 |
| 2023–24 | UEFA Europa League | QF | (France) Marseille | 2–1 | 0–1 (a.e.t.) | 2–2 (2–4 p) |
| 2024–25 | UEFA Champions League | LP | (Serbia) Red Star Belgrade | —N/a | 2–1 | 16th |
| 2024–25 | UEFA Champions League | LP | (Spain) Atlético Madrid | 4–0 | —N/a | 16th |
| 2024–25 | UEFA Champions League | LP | (Netherlands) Feyenoord | 1–3 | —N/a | 16th |
| 2024–25 | UEFA Champions League | LP | (Germany) Bayern Munich | —N/a | 0–1 | 16th |
| 2024–25 | UEFA Champions League | LP | (France) Monaco | —N/a | 3–2 | 16th |
| 2024–25 | UEFA Champions League | LP | (Italy) Bologna | 0–0 | —N/a | 16th |
| 2024–25 | UEFA Champions League | LP | (Spain) Barcelona | 4–5 | —N/a | 16th |
| 2024–25 | UEFA Champions League | LP | (Italy) Juventus | —N/a | 2–0 | 16th |
| 2024–25 | UEFA Champions League | KPO | (France) Monaco | 3–3 | 1–0 | 4–3 |
| 2024–25 | UEFA Champions League | R16 | (Spain) Barcelona | 0–1 | 1–3 | 1–4 |
| 2025 | FIFA Club World Cup | GS | (Argentina) Boca Juniors | —N/a | —N/a | 2–2 |
| 2025 | FIFA Club World Cup | GS | (New Zealand) Auckland City | —N/a | —N/a | 6–0 |
| 2025 | FIFA Club World Cup | GS | (Germany) Bayern Munich | —N/a | —N/a | 1–0 |
| 2025 | FIFA Club World Cup | R16 | (England) Chelsea | —N/a | —N/a | 1–4 (a.e.t.) |
| 2025–26 | UEFA Champions League | QR3 | (France) Nice | 2–0 | 2–0 | 4–0 |
| 2025–26 | UEFA Champions League | PO | (Turkey) Fenerbahçe | 1–0 | 0–0 | 1–0 |
| 2025–26 | UEFA Champions League | LP | (Azerbaijan) Qarabağ | 2–3 | —N/a | 24th |
| 2025–26 | UEFA Champions League | LP | (England) Chelsea | —N/a | 0–1 | 24th |
| 2025–26 | UEFA Champions League | LP | (England) Newcastle United | —N/a | 0–3 | 24th |
| 2025–26 | UEFA Champions League | LP | (Germany) Bayer Leverkusen | 0–1 | —N/a | 24th |
| 2025–26 | UEFA Champions League | LP | (Netherlands) Ajax | —N/a | 2–0 | 24th |
| 2025–26 | UEFA Champions League | LP | (Italy) Napoli | 2–0 | —N/a | 24th |
| 2025–26 | UEFA Champions League | LP | (Italy) Juventus | —N/a | 0–2 | 24th |
| 2025–26 | UEFA Champions League | LP | (Spain) Real Madrid | 4–2 | —N/a | 24th |
| 2025–26 | UEFA Champions League | KPO | (Spain) Real Madrid | 0–1 | 1–2 | 1–3 |
| 2026–27 | UEFA Europa League | QR2 | (Switzerland) St. Gallen | 5–0 | 1–2 | 6–2 |
| 2026–27 | UEFA Europa League | QR3 | (Scotland) Heart of Midlothian | 6–1 | 1–1 | 7–2 |
| 2026–27 | UEFA Europa League | PO | (Denmark) AGF | 3–1 | 3–1 | 6–2 |
| 2026–27 | UEFA Europa League | LP | (Italy) Milan | —N/a | 2–0 | |
| 2026–27 | UEFA Europa League | LP | (Scotland) Celtic | 4–1 | —N/a | |
| 2026–27 | UEFA Europa League | LP | (Cyprus) Omonia | —N/a | 4–1 | |
| 2026–27 | UEFA Europa League | LP | (Poland) Lech Poznań | 3–1 | —N/a | |
| 2026–27 | UEFA Europa League | LP | (Czech Republic) Viktoria Plzeň | —N/a | | |
| 2026–27 | UEFA Europa League | LP | (Greece) OFI Crete | | —N/a | |
| 2026–27 | UEFA Europa League | LP | (Netherlands) NEC Nijmegen | —N/a | | |
| 2026–27 | UEFA Europa League | LP | (Netherlands) AZ Alkmaar | | —N/a | |

Last updated: 16 September 2026
Note: Benfica score is always listed first.

For the competitive record in relation to the UEFA Youth League and Under-20 Intercontinental Cup, see also: S.L. Benfica (youth)

For the competitive record in relation to the Under-21 Premier League International Cup, see also: S.L. Benfica B

For the competitive record in relation to the UEFA Women's Champions League, see also: S.L. Benfica (women)

== Records ==
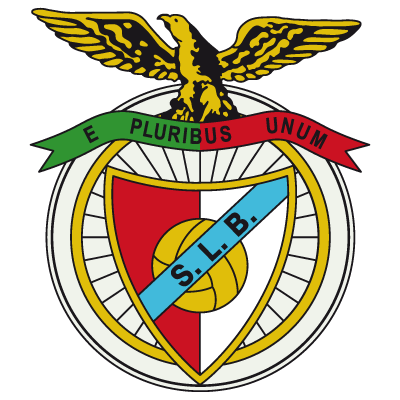
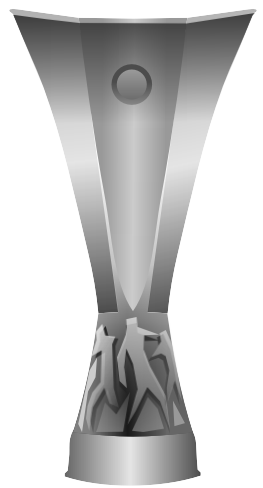
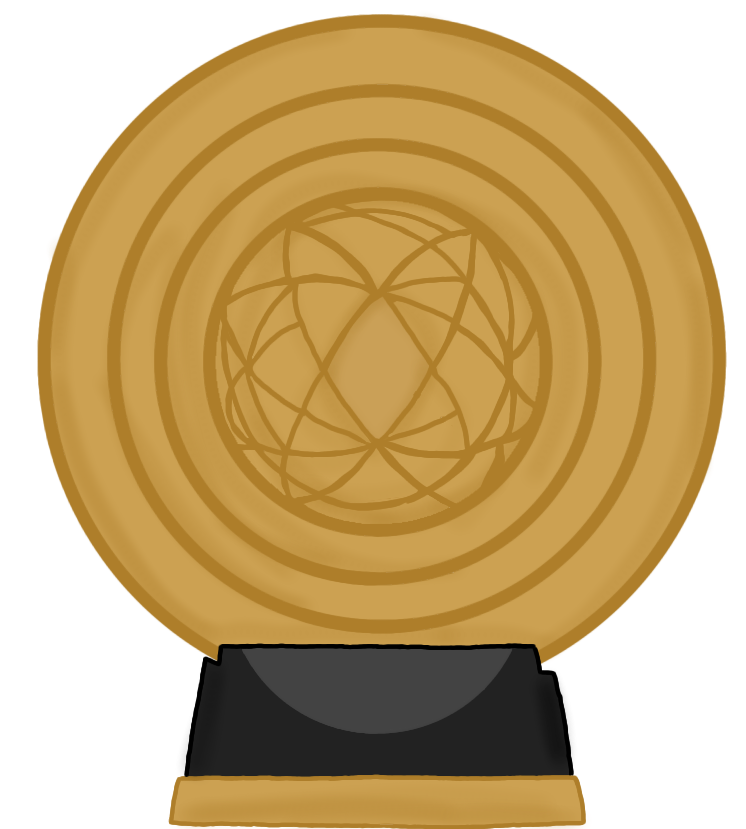
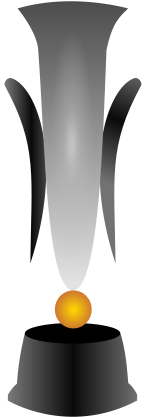
| | | | | | | | | | Total Titles |
|---|---|---|---|---|---|---|---|---|---|
| S.L. Benfica | 2 | – | – | – | 1 | X | X | X | 3 |

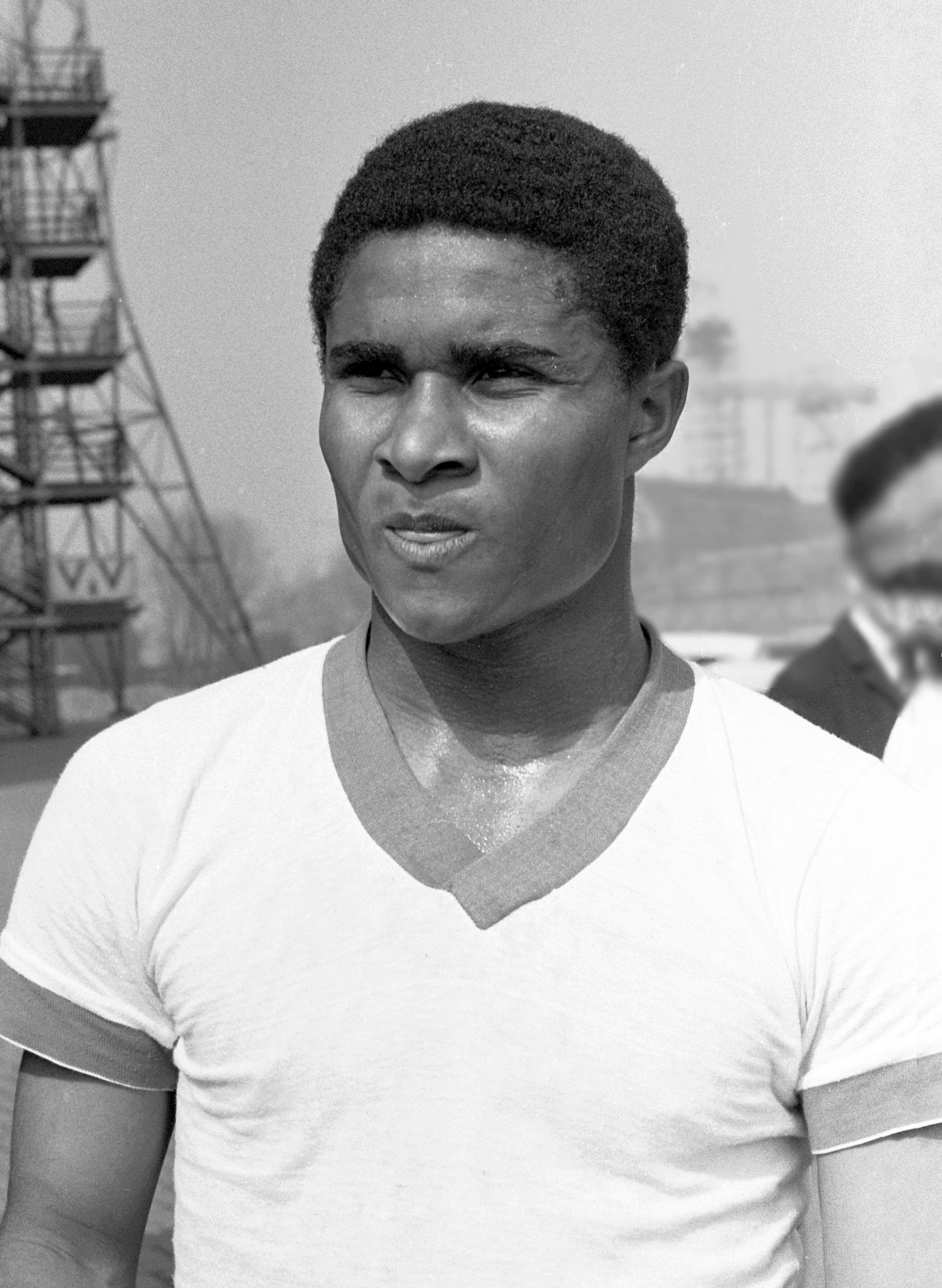
Eusébio is the Benfica player with the highest goal tally in international competitions, with 56 scored.

As of 16 September 2026

Benfica were the first Portuguese side to reach the final of the European Cup, the first to win it and the only one to this day to win the trophy in consecutive years. In the 1960s, they reached the final five times, more than any other team, surpassing Real Madrid and Milan, who reached three finals each. Their ten European finals are also a domestic record, and with 42 participations in the Champions League (formerly the European Cup), only Real Madrid has played more seasons in the competition.

- Most appearances in European competition: Luisão, 127
- Most goals in European competition: Eusébio, 56
- First European match: Sevilla 3–1 Benfica in the European Cup, on 19 September 1957
- Biggest win: Benfica 10–0 Stade Dudelange in the European Cup, on 5 October 1965
- First goal in European competition: Francisco Palmeiro, in the 40th minute against Sevilla, on 19 September 1957
- Biggest defeat: Celta Vigo 7–0 Benfica in the UEFA Cup, on 25 November 1999
- Highest European home attendance: 110,000, against Marseille in the European Cup, on 18 April 1990

=== Record by competition ===
| Competition | Pld | W | D | L | GF | GA | GD | Win% (Note: Win% is rounded to two decimal places.) |
|---|---|---|---|---|---|---|---|---|
| UEFA Champions League / European Cup | 320 | 143 | 71 | 106 | 522 | 380 | +142 | 44.69 |
| UEFA Cup Winners' Cup | 42 | 21 | 12 | 9 | 67 | 34 | +33 | 50.00 |
| UEFA Europa League / UEFA Cup | 147 | 74 | 35 | 38 | 248 | 164 | +84 | 50.34 |
| Inter-Cities Fairs Cup | 4 | 2 | 1 | 1 | 7 | 5 | +2 | 50.00 |
| Intercontinental Cup | 5 | 1 | 0 | 4 | 6 | 15 | −9 | 20.00 |
| FIFA Club World Cup | 4 | 2 | 1 | 1 | 10 | 6 | +4 | 50.00 |
| Total | 520 | 243 | 118 | 159 | 857 | 601 | +256 | 46.73 |

=== Record by country ===
| Country | Pld | W | D | L | GF | GA | GD | Win% (Note: Win% is rounded to two decimal places.) |
|---|---|---|---|---|---|---|---|---|
| Albania | 2 | 2 | 0 | 0 | 7 | 0 | +7 | 100.00 |
| Argentina | 1 | 0 | 1 | 0 | 2 | 2 | +0 | 0.00 |
| Austria | 10 | 6 | 3 | 1 | 24 | 8 | +16 | 60.00 |
| Azerbaijan | 1 | 0 | 0 | 1 | 2 | 3 | −1 | 0.00 |
| Belarus | 2 | 2 | 0 | 0 | 4 | 1 | +3 | 100.00 |
| Belgium | 23 | 14 | 5 | 4 | 41 | 20 | +21 | 60.87 |
| Brazil | 2 | 0 | 0 | 2 | 4 | 8 | −4 | 0.00 |
| Bulgaria | 6 | 4 | 2 | 0 | 13 | 8 | +5 | 66.67 |
| Croatia | 7 | 4 | 2 | 1 | 9 | 2 | +7 | 57.14 |
| Cyprus | 2 | 2 | 0 | 0 | 4 | 0 | +4 | 100.00 |
| Czech Republic | 6 | 2 | 3 | 1 | 6 | 5 | +1 | 33.33 |
| Denmark | 18 | 16 | 2 | 0 | 42 | 11 | +31 | 88.89 |
| England | 43 | 11 | 8 | 24 | 56 | 80 | −24 | 25.58 |
| Finland | 2 | 0 | 1 | 1 | 2 | 4 | −2 | 0.00 |
| France | 41 | 21 | 11 | 9 | 55 | 39 | +16 | 51.22 |
| Germany | 54 | 15 | 14 | 25 | 57 | 90 | −33 | 27.78 |
| Greece | 20 | 11 | 2 | 7 | 29 | 23 | +6 | 55.00 |
| Hungary | 14 | 9 | 2 | 3 | 37 | 13 | +24 | 64.29 |
| Iceland | 2 | 1 | 1 | 0 | 8 | 1 | +7 | 50.00 |
| Israel | 6 | 4 | 0 | 2 | 17 | 7 | +10 | 66.67 |
| Italy | 41 | 14 | 7 | 20 | 47 | 55 | −8 | 34.15 |
| Kazakhstan | 2 | 1 | 1 | 0 | 4 | 2 | +2 | 50.00 |
| Luxembourg | 4 | 4 | 0 | 0 | 28 | 2 | +26 | 100.00 |
| Malta | 2 | 2 | 0 | 0 | 10 | 0 | +10 | 100.00 |
| Netherlands | 31 | 13 | 11 | 7 | 47 | 34 | +13 | 41.94 |
| New Zealand | 1 | 1 | 0 | 0 | 6 | 0 | +6 | 100.00 |
| Northern Ireland | 8 | 5 | 3 | 0 | 21 | 7 | +14 | 62.50 |
| Norway | 6 | 5 | 0 | 1 | 11 | 4 | +7 | 83.33 |
| Poland | 6 | 4 | 2 | 0 | 15 | 4 | +11 | 66.67 |
| Portugal | 2 | 1 | 0 | 1 | 2 | 2 | +0 | 50.00 |
| Republic of Ireland | 2 | 2 | 0 | 0 | 6 | 1 | +5 | 100.00 |
| Romania | 12 | 7 | 4 | 1 | 13 | 5 | +8 | 58.33 |
| Russia | 21 | 9 | 4 | 8 | 25 | 23 | +2 | 42.86 |
| Scotland | 16 | 8 | 5 | 3 | 29 | 18 | +11 | 50.00 |
| Serbia | 3 | 2 | 0 | 1 | 6 | 4 | +2 | 66.67 |
| Slovakia | 2 | 2 | 0 | 0 | 5 | 0 | +5 | 100.00 |
| Slovenia | 4 | 3 | 1 | 0 | 17 | 2 | +15 | 75.00 |
| Spain | 36 | 9 | 9 | 18 | 46 | 56 | −10 | 25.00 |
| Sweden | 8 | 3 | 2 | 3 | 15 | 9 | +6 | 37.50 |
| Switzerland | 9 | 4 | 3 | 2 | 20 | 10 | +10 | 44.44 |
| Turkey | 19 | 8 | 7 | 4 | 29 | 15 | +14 | 42.11 |
| Ukraine | 16 | 10 | 2 | 4 | 29 | 9 | +20 | 62.50 |
| Uruguay | 3 | 1 | 0 | 2 | 2 | 7 | −5 | 33.33 |

=== International finals ===
==== European Cup ====
| Year | Competition | Opposing team | Score | Venue |
|---|---|---|---|---|
| 1961 | European Cup | (Spain) Barcelona | 3–2 | (Switzerland) Wankdorf Stadium, Bern |
| 1962 | European Cup | (Spain) Real Madrid | 5–3 | (Netherlands) Olympic Stadium, Amsterdam |
| 1963 | European Cup | (Italy) Milan | 1–2 | (England) Wembley Stadium, London |
| 1965 | European Cup | (Italy) Inter Milan | 0–1 | (Italy) San Siro, Milan |
| 1968 | European Cup | (England) Manchester United | 1–4 (a.e.t.) | (England) Wembley Stadium, London |
| 1988 | European Cup | (Netherlands) PSV Eindhoven | 0–0 (a.e.t.) (5–6 p) | (West Germany) Neckarstadion, Stuttgart |
| 1990 | European Cup | (Italy) Milan | 0–1 | (Austria) Praterstadion, Vienna |

==== UEFA Cup/UEFA Europa League ====
| Year | Competition | Opposing team | Score | Venue |
|---|---|---|---|---|
| 1983 | UEFA Cup | (Belgium) Anderlecht | 0–1 | (Belgium) Heysel Stadium, Brussels |
| 1983 | UEFA Cup | (Belgium) Anderlecht | 1–1 | (Portugal) Estádio da Luz, Lisbon |
| 2013 | UEFA Europa League | (England) Chelsea | 1–2 | (Netherlands) Amsterdam Arena, Amsterdam |
| 2014 | UEFA Europa League | (Spain) Sevilla | 0–0 (a.e.t.) (2–4 p) | (Italy) Juventus Stadium, Turin |

==== Intercontinental Cup ====
| Year | Competition | Opposing team | Score | Venue |
|---|---|---|---|---|
| 1961 | Intercontinental Cup | (Uruguay) Peñarol | 1–0 | (Portugal) Estádio da Luz, Lisbon |
| 1961 | Intercontinental Cup | (Uruguay) Peñarol | 0–5 | (Uruguay) Estadio Centenario, Montevideo |
| 1961 | Intercontinental Cup | (Uruguay) Peñarol | 1–2 (Note: Play-off) | (Uruguay) Estadio Centenario, Montevideo |
| 1962 | Intercontinental Cup | (Brazil) Santos | 2–3 | (Brazil) Maracanã Stadium, Rio de Janeiro |
| 1962 | Intercontinental Cup | (Brazil) Santos | 2–5 | (Portugal) Estádio da Luz, Lisbon |

==== Latin Cup ====
| Year | Competition | Opposing team | Score | Venue |
|---|---|---|---|---|
| 1950 | Latin Cup | (France) Bordeaux | 3–3 (a.e.t.) | (Portugal) Estádio Nacional do Jamor, Oeiras |
| 1950 | Latin Cup | (France) Bordeaux | 2–1 (a.e.t.) (Note: Replay match) | (Portugal) Estádio Nacional do Jamor, Oeiras |
| 1957 | Latin Cup | Real Madrid | 0–1 | (Spain) Santiago Bernabéu, Madrid |

=== Semi-finals ===
==== European Cup ====
| Year | Competition | Opposing team | Agg. | Other semi-finalists |
|---|---|---|---|---|
| 1961 | European Cup | (Austria) Rapid Wien | 4–1 | (Spain) Barcelona (West Germany) Hamburg |
| 1962 | European Cup | (England) Tottenham Hotspur | 4–3 | (Spain) Real Madrid (Belgium) Standard Liège |
| 1963 | European Cup | (Netherlands) Feyenoord | 3–1 | (Italy) Milan (Scotland) Dundee |
| 1965 | European Cup | (Hungary) Győri Vasas ETO | 5–0 | (Italy) Inter Milan (England) Liverpool |
| 1968 | European Cup | (Italy) Juventus | 3–0 | (England) Manchester United (Spain) Real Madrid |
| 1972 | European Cup | (Netherlands) Ajax | 0–1 | (Italy) Inter Milan (Scotland) Celtic |
| 1988 | European Cup | (Romania) Steaua București | 2–0 | (Netherlands) PSV Eindhoven (Spain) Real Madrid |
| 1990 | European Cup | (France) Marseille | 2–2 (a) | (Italy) Milan (West Germany) Bayern Munich |

==== Cup Winners' Cup ====
| Year | Competition | Opposing team | Agg. | Other semi-finalists |
|---|---|---|---|---|
| 1981 | UEFA Cup Winners' Cup | (East Germany) Carl Zeiss Jena | 1–2 | (Soviet Union) Dinamo Tbilisi (Netherlands) Feyenoord |
| 1994 | UEFA Cup Winners' Cup | (Italy) Parma | 2–2 (a) | (England) Arsenal (France) Paris Saint-Germain |

==== UEFA Cup/UEFA Europa League ====
| Year | Competition | Opposing team | Agg. | Other semi-finalists |
|---|---|---|---|---|
| 1983 | UEFA Cup | (Romania) Universitatea Craiova | 1–1 (a) | (Belgium) Anderlecht (Czechoslovakia) Bohemians ČKD Prague |
| 2011 | UEFA Europa League | (Portugal) Braga | 2–2 (a) | (Portugal) Porto (Spain) Villarreal |
| 2013 | UEFA Europa League | (Turkey) Fenerbahçe | 3–2 | (England) Chelsea (Switzerland) Basel |
| 2014 | UEFA Europa League | (Italy) Juventus | 2–1 | (Spain) Valencia (Spain) Sevilla |

==== Latin Cup ====
| Year | Competition | Opposing team | Score | Other semi-finalists |
|---|---|---|---|---|
| 1950 | Latin Cup | (Italy) Lazio | 3–0 | (France) Bordeaux (Spain) Atlético Madrid |
| 1956 | Latin Cup | (Italy) Milan | 2–4 | (Spain) Athletic Bilbao (France) Nice |
| 1957 | Latin Cup | (France) Saint-Étienne | 1–0 | (Spain) Real Madrid (Italy) Milan |

== See also ==
- List of UEFA club competition winners
- S.L. Benfica (youth)
- S.L. Benfica B
- S.L. Benfica (women)
