= 2013 UEFA Europa League final =

- Match programme cover
- Event: 2012–13 UEFA Europa League
Benfica	Chelsea
(Portugal)	(England)
1	2
- Date: 15 May 2013
- Venue: Amsterdam Arena, Amsterdam
- Man of the Match: Branislav Ivanović (Chelsea)
- Referee: Björn Kuipers (Netherlands)
- Attendance: 46,163
- Weather: Partly cloudy 13 °C (55 °F); 54% humidity

The 2013 UEFA Europa League final was the final match of the 2012–13 UEFA Europa League, the 42nd season of Europe's secondary club football tournament organised by UEFA, and the 4th season since it was renamed from the UEFA Cup to the UEFA Europa League. The match was played at the Amsterdam Arena in Amsterdam, Netherlands, on 15 May 2013, between Portuguese side Benfica and English side Chelsea. Chelsea won 2–1 to secure their first title in this competition.

Chelsea were the first UEFA Champions League title holders to play in the following season's Europa League, after becoming the first Champions League holders to be eliminated in the group stage. With this triumph, they became the only Champions League holders to win the Europa League (no other team did so prior to 2024, when amended regulations meant this was no longer a possibility). Chelsea also became the fourth club, and first in England, to win all three major UEFA club titles at the time, having won the Cup Winners' Cup in 1971 and 1998, and still held the Champions League title won for the first time the previous year. Chelsea were also the first team since Manchester United in the 1991 European Cup Winners' Cup final to win a major European final without making any substitutions.

As a result of winning this competition, Chelsea secured a place in the 2013 UEFA Super Cup against the winners of the 2012–13 UEFA Champions League, Bayern Munich.

== Venue ==
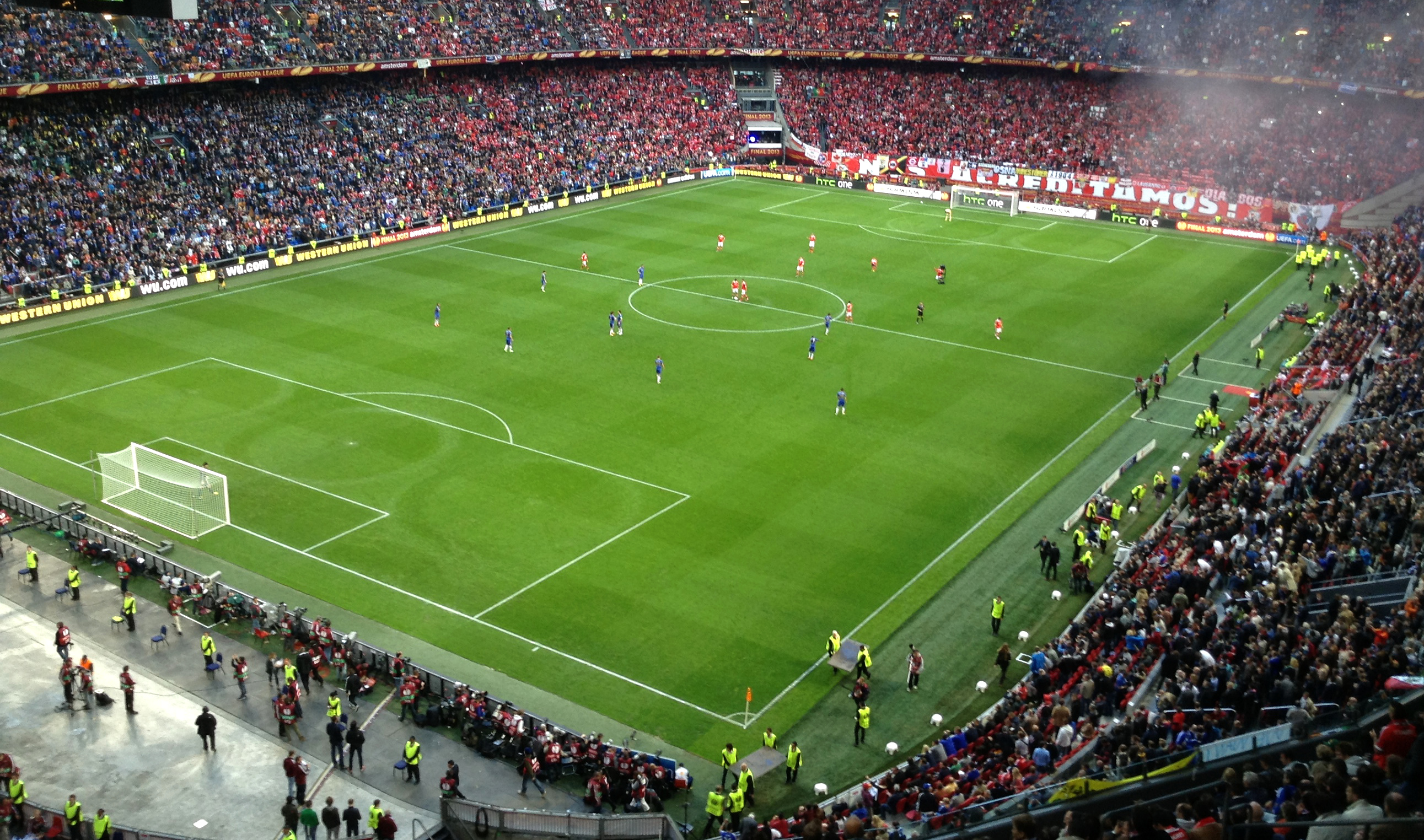
The match was played at Amsterdam Arena in front of more than 46,000 spectators.

The Amsterdam Arena was announced as the venue of the 2013 UEFA Europa League final on 16 June 2011. The home stadium of Ajax since 1996, it staged the 1998 UEFA Champions League final, where Real Madrid beat Juventus 1–0 for their seventh title, and was also one of the UEFA Euro 2000 venues, hosting five games including a semi-final.

The previous home for Ajax's European matches, the Olympisch Stadion, also played host to European finals. One-legged finals include the 1962 European Cup final, where Benfica defeated Real Madrid 5–3, and the 1977 European Cup Winners' Cup final, where Anderlecht were beaten 2–0 by Hamburger SV. It also hosted the second legs of the 1981 UEFA Cup final, between AZ '67 and Ipswich Town, and of the 1992 UEFA Cup final, between Ajax and Torino.

== Background ==
Benfica qualified for their ninth European final, the first in 23 years since their 1–0 loss to A.C. Milan in the 1990 European Cup final. Previous appearances include back-to-back victories in the 1961 and 1962 European Cup finals (3–2 over Barcelona and 5–3 over Real Madrid, respectively) and unsuccessful presences in five other European Cup finals – 1963 (1–2 to Milan), 1965 (0–1 to Inter Milan), 1968 (1–4 to Manchester United), 1988 (0–0, 5–6 on penalties to PSV Eindhoven) and 1990 (0–1 to Milan) – and one UEFA Cup final in 1983 (1–2 on aggregate to Anderlecht).

Before this season, Chelsea had never reached a final of the UEFA Cup or UEFA Europa League. They previously appeared in two UEFA Cup Winners' Cup finals in 1971 (2–1 win over Real Madrid) and 1998 (1–0 win over VfB Stuttgart), and two UEFA Champions League finals in 2008 (1–1, lost 5–6 on penalties to Manchester United) and 2012 (1–1, won 4–3 on penalties over Bayern Munich).

The only previous meeting between Benfica and Chelsea in European competition was in the 2011–12 UEFA Champions League quarter-finals, which the English won 3–1 on aggregate (1–0 in Lisbon and 2–1 in London) en route to the title. Both Benfica and Chelsea finished third in the 2012–13 UEFA Champions League group stage, and entered the 2012–13 Europa League in the round of 32. It was the fourth time in the tournament's history that both finalists featured in the Champions League group stage earlier in the season, after 2000, 2002 and 2009.

== Route to the final ==
Note: In all results below, the score of the finalist is given first.

(Portugal) Benfica				Round	(England) Chelsea			
Champions League
Opponent	Result			Group stage	Opponent	Result		
(Scotland) Celtic	0–0 (A)			Matchday 1	(Italy) Juventus	2–2 (H)		
(Spain) Barcelona	0–2 (H)			Matchday 2	(Denmark) Nordsjælland	4–0 (A)		
(Russia) Spartak Moscow	1–2 (A)			Matchday 3	(Ukraine) Shakhtar Donetsk	1–2 (A)		
(Russia) Spartak Moscow	2–0 (H)			Matchday 4	(Ukraine) Shakhtar Donetsk	3–2 (H)		
(Scotland) Celtic	2–1 (H)			Matchday 5	(Italy) Juventus	0–3 (A)		
(Spain) Barcelona	0–0 (A)			Matchday 6	(Denmark) Nordsjælland	6–1 (H)		
Group G third place: Pos / Team / Pld / Pts; 1 / (Spain) Barcelona / 6 / 13; 2 / (Scotland) Celtic / 6 / 10; 3 / (Portugal) Benfica / 6 / 8; 4 / (Russia) Spartak Moscow / 6 / 3; Source: Soccerway				Final standings	Group E third place: Pos / Team / Pld / Pts; 1 / (Italy) Juventus / 6 / 12; 2 / (Ukraine) Shakhtar Donetsk / 6 / 10; 3 / (England) Chelsea / 6 / 10; 4 / (Denmark) Nordsjælland / 6 / 1; Source: Soccerway			
Europa League
Opponent	Agg.	1st leg	2nd leg	Knockout phase	Opponent	Agg.	1st leg	2nd leg
(Germany) Bayer Leverkusen	3–1	1–0 (A)	2–1 (H)	Round of 32	(Czech Republic) Sparta Prague	2–1	1–0 (A)	1–1 (H)
(France) Bordeaux	4–2	1–0 (H)	3–2 (A)	Round of 16	(Romania) Steaua București	3–2	0–1 (A)	3–1 (H)
(England) Newcastle United	4–2	3–1 (H)	1–1 (A)	Quarter-finals	(Russia) Rubin Kazan	5–4	3–1 (H)	2–3 (A)
(Turkey) Fenerbahçe	3–2	0–1 (A)	3–1 (H)	Semi-finals	(Switzerland) Basel	5–2	2–1 (A)	3–1 (H)

== Pre-match ==
=== Ambassador ===
Former Dutch international Patrick Kluivert, who won the UEFA Champions League with Ajax, was appointed as the official ambassador for the final.

=== Officials ===
On 13 May 2013, Dutch referee Björn Kuipers was appointed to the final. He was joined by fellow Dutch officials Sander van Roekel and Erwin Zeinstra as assistant referees, Pol van Boekel and Richard Liesveld as additional assistant referees, Berry Simons as reserve assistant referee, and German official Felix Brych as fourth official.

=== Ticketing ===
The international ticket sales phase for the general public ran from 3 December 2012 to 18 January 2013. Tickets were available in four price categories: €135, €100, €70, and €45. Each finalist club was allocated 9,800 tickets.

=== Team selection ===
Chelsea's Eden Hazard was ruled out of the final after not recovering from a hamstring injury he suffered in Chelsea's 2–1 Premier League victory against Aston Villa on 11 May. Chelsea captain and centre-back John Terry was also absent through injury. Three players faced their former clubs: Benfica's Nemanja Matić, who was transferred from Chelsea, and Chelsea's David Luiz and Ramires, who were transferred from Benfica.

== Match ==
=== Summary ===
Fernando Torres put Chelsea ahead in the 60th minute by rounding the goalkeeper and clipping in after being put clean in on goal by Juan Mata. Óscar Cardozo equalised with a penalty eight minutes later awarded after Eduardo Salvio's header struck César Azpilicueta's hand. Branislav Ivanović scored in the final minute of stoppage time with a header into the far corner from a Mata corner from the right to clinch a 2–1 win for Chelsea and with it their first Europa League title.

=== Details ===
15 May 2013
20:45 UTC+2

Benfica (Portugal)	1–2	(England) Chelsea
Cardozo 68' (pen.)	Report	Torres 60'; Ivanović 90+3'

Amsterdam Arena, Amsterdam
Attendance: 46,163
Referee: Björn Kuipers (Netherlands)

Benfica	Chelsea

GK	1	(Brazil) Artur
RB	34	(Portugal) André Almeida
CB	4	(Brazil) Luisão (c)	(yellow card) 61'
CB	24	(Argentina) Ezequiel Garay	(yellow card) 45+1'	(substituted off) 78'
LB	25	(Paraguay) Lorenzo Melgarejo		(substituted off) 66'
RM	35	(Argentina) Enzo Pérez
CM	21	(Serbia) Nemanja Matić
LM	19	(Spain) Rodrigo		(substituted off) 66'
RF	20	(Argentina) Nicolás Gaitán
CF	7	(Paraguay) Óscar Cardozo
LF	18	(Argentina) Eduardo Salvio
Substitutes:
GK	13	(Portugal) Paulo Lopes
DF	33	(Brazil) Jardel		(substituted on) 78'
MF	10	(Argentina) Pablo Aimar
MF	15	(Netherlands) Ola John		(substituted on) 66'
MF	23	(Uruguay) Jonathan Urretaviscaya
MF	89	(Portugal) André Gomes
FW	11	(Brazil) Lima		(substituted on) 66'
Manager:
(Portugal) Jorge Jesus

GK	1	(Czech Republic) Petr Čech
RB	28	(Spain) César Azpilicueta
CB	2	(Serbia) Branislav Ivanović
CB	24	(England) Gary Cahill
LB	3	(England) Ashley Cole
CM	8	(England) Frank Lampard (c)
CM	4	(Brazil) David Luiz
RW	7	(Brazil) Ramires
AM	10	(Spain) Juan Mata
LW	11	(Brazil) Oscar	(yellow card) 14'
CF	9	(Spain) Fernando Torres
Substitutes:
GK	22	(England) Ross Turnbull
DF	19	(Portugal) Paulo Ferreira
MF	12	(Nigeria) Mikel John Obi
MF	21	(Germany) Marko Marin
MF	30	(Israel) Yossi Benayoun
DF	57	(Netherlands) Nathan Aké
FW	13	(Nigeria) Victor Moses
Manager:
(Spain) Rafael Benítez

Man of the Match:
Branislav Ivanović (Chelsea)

Assistant referees:
Sander van Roekel (Netherlands)
Erwin Zeinstra (Netherlands)
Fourth official:
Felix Brych (Germany)
Additional assistant referees:
Pol van Boekel (Netherlands)
Richard Liesveld (Netherlands)
Reserve assistant referee:
Berry Simons (Netherlands)

Match rules

- 90 minutes
- 30 minutes of extra time if necessary
- Penalty shoot-out if scores still level
- Seven named substitutes, of which three may be used

=== Statistics ===
First half
Statistic	Benfica	Chelsea
Goals scored	0	0
Total shots	8	3
Shots on target	5	2
Saves	2	5
Ball possession	55%	45%
Corner kicks	1	1
Fouls committed	7	8
Offsides	0	4
Yellow cards	1	1
Red cards	0	0

Second half
Statistic	Benfica	Chelsea
Goals scored	1	2
Total shots	9	8
Shots on target	6	5
Saves	3	5
Ball possession	52%	48%
Corner kicks	3	3
Fouls committed	11	10
Offsides	1	4
Yellow cards	1	0
Red cards	0	0

Overall
Statistic	Benfica	Chelsea
Goals scored	1	2
Total shots	17	11
Shots on target	11	7
Saves	5	10
Ball possession	54%	46%
Corner kicks	4	4
Fouls committed	18	18
Offsides	1	8
Yellow cards	2	1
Red cards	0	0

== See also ==
- 2013 UEFA Champions League final
- 2013 UEFA Super Cup
- Chelsea F.C. in international football
- S.L. Benfica in international football
- 2012–13 Chelsea F.C. season
- 2012–13 S.L. Benfica season
