= Felix Brych =

German football referee

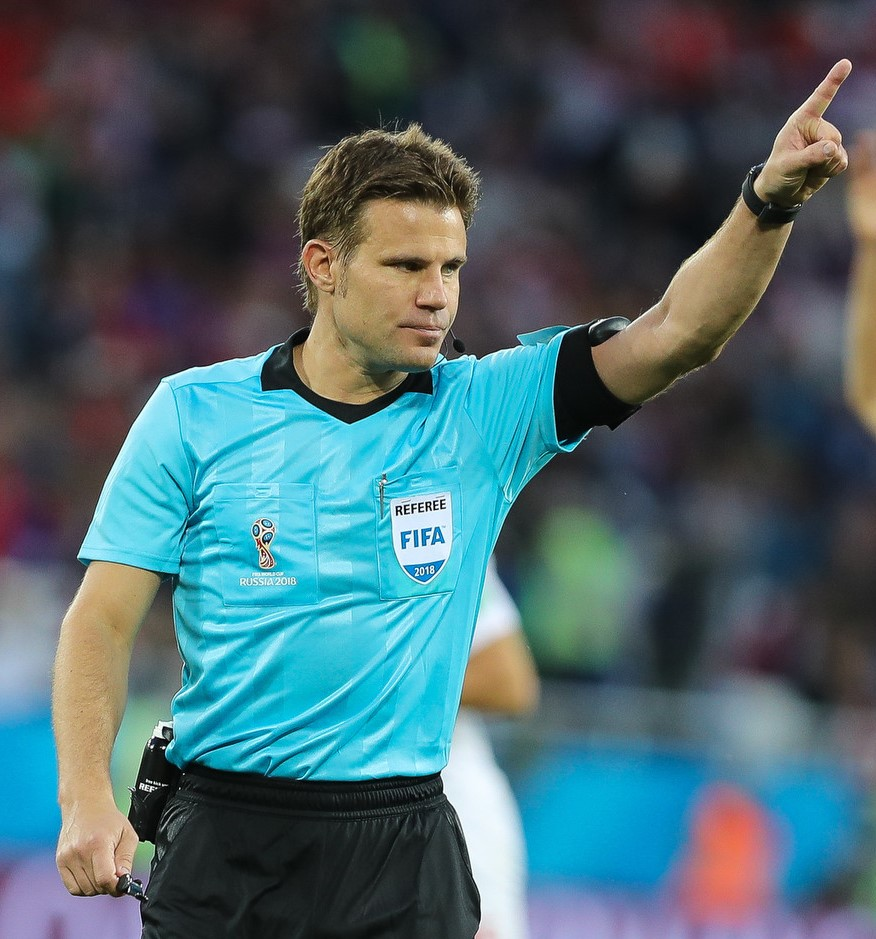
- Brych at the 2018 FIFA World Cup
- Born: 3 August 1975 (age 51); Munich, West Germany
- Other occupation: Lawyer

Domestic
Years	League	Role
1999–	DFB	Referee
2001–2025	2. Bundesliga	Referee
2004–2025	Bundesliga	Referee

International
Years	League	Role
2007–2021	FIFA listed	Referee

Felix Brych (born 3 August 1975) is a former German football referee. He refereed for SV Am Hart München of the Bavarian Football Association. He is a former FIFA referee and was ranked as a UEFA elite category referee. He retired at the end of the 2024–25 Bundesliga season.

== Refereeing career ==
Brych started refereeing in the Bundesliga in 2004 and was awarded his FIFA badge in 2007. He refereed his first senior international match in October that year, taking charge of Romania's 2–0 win over Luxembourg in UEFA Euro 2008 qualifying Group G. In February 2008, Brych was appointed to referee the 2007–08 UEFA Cup Round of 32 match between Panathinaikos and Rangers, and in October 2008, he officiated the 2008–09 UEFA Champions League Group D match between Liverpool and PSV Eindhoven.

Brych officiated the first leg of the 2011–12 Champions League semi-final between Chelsea and Barcelona, a match that finished with a win for the Blues over the defending champions. In August 2013 he officiated an international friendly between England and Scotland at Wembley Stadium.

On 14 May 2014, Brych refereed the 2014 UEFA Europa League Final between Sevilla and Benfica. The match finished 0–0 after extra time, and went to a penalty shoot-out, which Sevilla won 4–2, in what was considered a controversial officiating.

On 12 May 2017, Brych was chosen by UEFA as the referee for the 2017 UEFA Champions League Final, played in Cardiff on 3 June 2017 between Juventus and Real Madrid. He was joined by assistants Mark Borsch and Stefan Lupp, and the fourth official was Serbian Milorad Mažić. Bastian Dankert and Marco Fritz served as the additional assistant referees, with Rafael Foltyn appointed as the reserve assistant referee. During the match, he controversially sent-off Juventus's Juan Cuadrado in the second half for a double booking, after he allegedly fouled Real Madrid's Sergio Ramos; Real Madrid won the match 4–1.

On 29 March 2018, Brych was selected by FIFA as one of the referees to officiate at the 2018 FIFA World Cup in Russia, his second FIFA World Cup. Brych was joined by assistants Mark Borsch and Stefan Lupp. He refereed just one game at the tournament, Switzerland's 2–1 win over Serbia. However, after controversially not awarding Serbia a penalty, FIFA made the decision that Brych would officiate no further matches at the tournament. The politically explosive match was followed by heavy criticism from the Serbian media and representatives of Serbian football. In this regard, Mladen Krstajić, the coach of the Serbia national team, said one day after the lost game with a view to the war crimes of the Yugoslav Wars: "I would send him to the Hague. Then they could put him on trial, like he did to us." For this Krstajić was punished with a fine of 5,000 Swiss francs.

At UEFA Euro 2020 he was rehabilitated and refereed one game of the Round of 16 (Belgium's 1-0 win over Portugal), one quarter-final (England's 4-0 win over Ukraine on 3 July 2021) and finally the semi-final game between Italy and Spain, at Wembley Stadium, London, on 6 July (with Italy prevailing 4–2 on penalties following a 1–1 draw).

On 25 November 2023, Brych tore his PCL during a game between Eintracht Frankfurt and VfB Stuttgart. The game also marked Brych 344th appearance in the Bundesliga which tied Wolfgang Stark for the most in Bundesliga history.

== Personal life ==
Outside football Brych is a qualified doctor of law, having written his doctorate about sport.

== Record ==
=== Major national team competition ===
2014 FIFA World Cup – Brazil
Date	Match	Venue	Round
14 June 2014	Uruguay – Costa Rica	Fortaleza	Group stage
22 June 2014	Belgium – Russia	Rio De Janeiro	Group stage

2018 FIFA World Cup – Russia
Date	Match	Venue	Round
22 June 2018	Serbia – Switzerland	Kaliningrad	Group stage

UEFA Euro 2016 – France
Date	Match	Venue	Round
16 June 2016	England – Wales	Lens	Group stage
22 June 2016	Sweden – Belgium	Nice	Group stage
30 June 2016	Poland – Portugal	Marseille	Quarter-finals

UEFA Euro 2020 – Europe
Date	Match	Venue	Round
13 June 2021	Netherlands – Ukraine	(Netherlands) Amsterdam	Group stage
21 June 2021	Finland – Belgium	(Russia) Saint Petersburg	Group Stage
27 June 2021	Belgium – Portugal	(Spain) Seville	Round of 16
3 July 2021	Ukraine – England	(Italy) Rome	Quarter-finals
6 July 2021	Italy – Spain	(England) London	Semi-finals

=== Other international tournament matches ===
Other matches
Date	Match	Venue	Round
29 July 2012	Senegal – Uruguay	(United Kingdom) London	Olympics Group-Stage
4 August 2012	Brazil – Honduras	(United Kingdom) Newcastle	Olympics Knock-out Stage (Quarter-finals)
22 June 2013	Japan – Mexico	(Brazil) Belo Horizonte	FIFA Confederations Cup Group-Stage

=== UEFA club competition ===
UEFA club competition finals
Date	Match	Venue	Round
14 May 2014	(Spain) Sevilla – (Portugal) Benfica	(Italy) Turin	UEFA Europa League Final
3 June 2017	(Italy) Juventus – (Spain) Real Madrid	(Wales) Cardiff	UEFA Champions League Final

== Honours ==
- Globe Soccer Awards – Best Referee of the Year: 2017
- IFFHS World's Best Man Referee: 2017, 2021
- IFFHS World's Best Man Referee of the Decade 2011–2020
- IFFHS World's Best Man Referee of the 21st Century 2001–2020

Sporting positions (Germany) Felix Brych
Preceded by (Netherlands) Björn Kuipers	2014 UEFA Europa League Final referee	Succeeded by (England) Martin Atkinson
Preceded by (England) Mark Clattenburg	2017 UEFA Champions League Final referee	Succeeded by (Serbia) Milorad Mažić
