= 1949–50 S.L. Benfica season =

Benfica
1949–50 season
- President: Mário Gusmão Madeira
- Head coach: Ted Smith
- Stadium: Estádio da Luz
- Primeira Divisão: 1st
- Taça de Portugal: Not held
- Latin Cup: Winner
- Top goalscorer: League: Julinho (28); All: Julinho (28)
- Biggest win: Benfica 7–1 S.C. Covilhã (8 January 1950)
- Biggest defeat: O Elvas 1–0 Benfica (13 November 1949); Benfica 2–3 Sporting (16 April 1950)
Home colours	Away colours

The 1949–50 season was Sport Lisboa e Benfica's 46th season in existence and the club's 16th consecutive season in the top flight of Portuguese football, covering the period from 1 August 1949 to 30 July 1950. Benfica competed in the Primeira Divisão and in the Latin Cup.

The season saw the club end a four-year league title drought, winning the Primeira Divisão under manager Ted Smith in his second year in charge. The team led the championship for most of the campaign and secured the title with two matches remaining. Benfica also competed in the Latin Cup, defeating Lazio and Bordeaux to win the tournament on home soil.

== Season summary ==
Benfica entered the season seeking to reclaim the league title after a four-year drought. Manager Ted Smith, who had won the Taça de Portugal in the previous season, remained in charge for a second year. The off-season featured several departures, including that of Álvaro Gaspar Pinto. Only two players joined the squad, Raul Pascoal and António Lourenço.

Before the first official match of the season, Benfica played seven friendlies, recording three wins, two defeats and two draws. These included a 1–0 loss to Sporting.

Benfica's first official match of the season was a 3–2 away win over Braga. The team followed this with three further victories, finishing October in first place with eight points, level with Sporting. The following month began with a 1–1 home draw against Académica, and was followed by a 1–0 away defeat to O Elvas, which left the team in second place, one point behind Sporting. Benfica then recorded three consecutive wins, once again returning to first place with the same number of points as Sporting.

On 11 December, Benfica played Sporting away in the Derby de Lisboa, winning 2–1 and moving into first place outright for the first time that season. The team followed this result with a 6–1 home win over Vitória de Setúbal and a 1–0 away win against Porto in O Clássico. Benfica ended January with two more wins and a draw, finishing the month with a four-point advantage.

Between league fixtures, Benfica, along with other Portuguese clubs, faced the Argentinian sides San Lorenzo and Racing at the Estádio Nacional, losing 5–2 to the former, and winning 4–2 against the latter. February began with a 1–1 draw against Belenenses, after which the team recorded a six-match winning streak, ending March with an eight-point advantage and four matches remaining.

On 16 April, Benfica hosted Sporting at the Estádio do Campo Grande in a decisive Derby de Lisboa. A victory would have secured the league title for Benfica, but Sporting won the match 3–2. In the following matchday, a 5–0 victory away to Vitória de Setúbal secured the championship for Benfica, ending a four-year title drought. The team ended the campaign with two further wins, against Porto and Covilhã.

As league champions, Benfica qualified for the Latin Cup. Due to the competition being staged at the Estádio Nacional, the Taça de Portugal was not held that season. In preparation for the tournament, the team played four friendly matches, winning all of them, including a 3–2 victory over Sporting at the inauguration of the Estádio 28 de Maio. In the semi-final, Benfica faced the Italian representatives Lazio, winning 3–0. Rosário opened the scoring in the seventh minute, followed by a goal from Rogério Pipi in the 27th minute. In the second half, Arsénio added a third to seal the victory and send the team into the final.

The following day, Benfica met the French champions Bordeaux in the final at the Estádio Nacional. The match ended in a 3–3 draw, requiring a replay. On 18 June, the two teams met again at the Estádio Nacional. Bordeaux took an early lead through Kargu in the eighth minute and held a 1–0 advantage at half-time. Benfica were unable to equalise until the 90th minute, when Arsénio scored to force extra time. After a goalless first period of sudden-death extra time, the match proceeded to a second period, during which Julinho scored in the 146th minute to give Benfica the victory and secure the trophy on home soil.

== Competitions ==
Win Draw Loss Postponed

=== Overall record ===
Competition	First match	Last match	Record								
Competition	First match	Last match	G	W	D	L	GF	GA	GD	Win %	Source
Primeira Divisão	9 October 1949	7 May 1950	26	21	3	2	86	33	+53	80.77	
Latin Cup	10 June 1950	18 June 1950	3	2	1	0	8	4	+4	66.67	
Total			29	23	4	2	94	37	+57	79.31	

=== Primeira Divisão ===
==== League table ====
Pos	Team	Pld	W	D	L	GF	GA	GD	Pts	Qualification or relegation
1	Benfica (C)	26	21	3	2	86	33	+53	45	Qualified for the Latin Cup
2	Sporting CP	26	19	1	6	91	35	+56	39	
3	Atlético CP	26	11	8	7	53	42	+11	30	
4	Belenenses	26	10	7	9	36	41	−5	27	
5	Porto	26	12	2	12	61	52	+9	26	

(C) Champions

==== Results by round ====
Round	1	2	3	4	5	6	7	8	9	10	11	12	13	14	15	16	17	18	19	20	21	22	23	24	25	26
Ground	A	H	A	H	H	A	H	A	H	A	H	A	H	H	A	H	A	A	H	A	H	A	H	A	H	A
Result	W	W	W	W	D	L	W	W	W	W	W	W	W	W	D	D	W	W	W	W	W	W	W	L	W	W
Position	2	2	1	1	1	2	2	2	2	1	1	1	1	1	1	1	1	1	1	1	1	1	1	1	1	1

Source: ForaDeJogo
A = Away; H = Home; W = Win; D = Draw; L = Loss

==== Matches ====
9 October 1949 1	Braga	2–3	Benfica	Braga
	Diamantino 7'; Brandão 40'	Report	6' Pipi; 69', 76' Arsénio	Stadium: Campo da Ponte; Referee: Vieira da Costa

16 October 1949 2	Benfica	4–0	Atlético	Lisbon
	Julinho 17', 67'; Pipi 31' (pen.); Rosário 76'	Report		Stadium: Estádio do Campo Grande; Referee: José Serandezes

23 October 1949 3	Belenenses	1–6	Benfica	Lisbon
	Diógenes 22'	Report	16', 55' Gil; 49' (pen.) Pipi; 76' Julinho; 82', 8 ' Melão	Stadium: Estádio José Manuel Soares; Referee: Paulo de Oliveira

30 October 1949 4	Benfica	5–1	Olhanense	Lisbon
	Rosário 31'; Julinho 43', 83', 89'; Gil 60'	Report	70' Eminêncio	Stadium: Estádio do Campo Grande; Referee: Vieira da Costa

6 November 1949 5	Benfica	1–1	Académica	Lisbon
	Gil 51'	Report	6' Bentes	Stadium: Estádio do Campo Grande; Referee: Libertino Domingues

13 November 1959 6	O Elvas	1–0	Benfica	Elvas
	Manuelito 76'	Report		Stadium: Estádio Municipal de Elvas; Referee: Paulo de Oliveira

20 November 1949 7	Benfica	4–0	Vitória de Guimarães	Lisbon
	Gil 4', 23'; Julinho 15'; Raul Pascoal 80'	Report		Stadium: Estádio do Campo Grande; Referee: Domingos Miranda

27 November 1949 8	Lusitano VRSA	2–3	Benfica	Vila Real de Santo António
	Calvinho 1'; Pedroto 9'	Report	22' Julinho; Rosário 29'; Pipi 83' (pen.)	Stadium: Campo de Jogos Francisco Gomes Socorro; Referee: Cunha Pinto

4 December 1949 9	Benfica	4–0	Estoril Praia	Lisbon
	Julinho 27', 30', 80'; Rosário 67'	Report		Stadium: Estádio do Campo Grande; Referee: Cunha Pinto

11 December 1949 10	Sporting	1–2	Benfica	Lisbon
	Correira 52'	Report	46' Pipi; 85' Julinho	Referee: Paulo de Oliveira

18 December 1949 11	Benfica	6–1	Vitória de Setúbal	Lisbon
	Julinho 3', 27', 82'; Pipi 34'; Fontes 46' (pen.); Rosário 67'	Report	89' Pereira	Stadium: Estádio do Campo Grande; Referee: Adriano Gonçalves

2 January 1950 12	Porto	0–1	Benfica	Porto
		Report	25' Julinho	Stadium: Campo da Constituição; Referee: Reis Santos

8 January 1950 13	Benfica	7–1	Covilhã	Lisbon
	Julinho 10', 54'; Melão 34', 66'; Arsénio 37', 49'; Moreira 56'	Report	42' Tomé	Stadium: Estádio do Campo Grande

22 January 1950 14	Benfica	4–2	Braga	Lisbon
	Julinho 32'; Melão 62'; Pipi 70' (pen.), 75' (pen.)	Report	23', 61' Arias	Stadium: Estádio do Campo Grande

29 January 1950 15	Atlético	1–1	Benfica	Lisbon
	Martinho 48'	Report	1' Julinho	Stadium: Estádio da Tapadinha

5 February 1950 16	Benfica	1–1	Belenenses	Lisbon
	Gil 7'	Report	45' (pen.) Fernandes	Stadium: Estádio do Campo Grande

12 February 1950 17	Olhanense	1–2	Benfica	Olhão
	Fernando Cabrita 19'	Report	25' Julinho; Rodrigues 53' (o.g.)	Stadium: Estádio Padinha

19 February 1950 18	Académica	3–4	Benfica	Coimbra
	Bentes 25'; Duarte 32', 55'	Report	44', 75' Julinho; 60' Arsénio; 74' Melão

26 February 1950 19	Benfica	3–1	O Elvas	Santarém
	Pipi 53' (pen.); Teixeira 72'; Arsénio 89'	Report	4' Patalino	Stadium: Campo Alfredo Aguiar; Attendance: 16,000

5 March 1950 20	Vitória de Guimarães	3–5	Benfica	Guimarães
	Coelho 15', 89'; Magalhães 60'	Report	6' Rosário; 13', 48' Teixeira; 80', 82' Pipi	Stadium: Campo da Amorosa

12 March 1950 21	Benfica	4–1	Lusitano VRSA	Lisbon
	Arsénio 34', 38'; Pipi 75'; Lima 85'	Report	32' Vasques	Stadium: Estádio do Campo Grande

19 March 1950 22	Estoril Praia	1–2	Benfica	Estoril
	Vieira 50'	Report	46' Julinho; 47' Arsénio

16 April 1950 23	Benfica	2–3	Sporting	Lisbon
	Pipi 8' (pen.); Julinho 25'	Report	12' Correia; 19' Martins; 30' Vasques	Stadium: Estádio Nacional; Referee: Reis Santos

23 April 1950 24	Vitória de Setúbal	1–2	Benfica	Setúbal
		Report	29' Pascoal; 31' Julinho; 47' Arsénio; 65', 75' Pipi	Stadium: Campo dos Arcos; Referee: Adriano Gonçalves

30 April 1950 25	Benfica	3–2	Porto	Lisbon
	Pipi 28'; Pascoal 81', 85'	Report	35', 87' Vital	Stadium: Estádio do Campo Grande; Referee: Libertino Domingues

7 May 1950 26	Covilhã	3–4	Benfica	Covilhã
	Livramento 39', 45'; 89' Tomé	Report	15', 54' Julinho; 65' (o.g.) Pedro; 88' Pascoal	Stadium: Estádio Municipal José dos Santos Pinto; Referee: Vieira da Costa

=== Taça de Portugal ===
The Cup was not organized in the 1949–50 season because the Estádio Nacional was the host venue for the Latin Cup.

=== Latin Cup ===
==== Semi-Final ====
10 June 1950	Benfica	3–0	Lazio	Oeiras, Portugal
18:05	Rosário 7'; Pipi 27'; Arsénio 76'			Stadium: Estádio Nacional do Jamor; Referee: Julián Arqué (Spain)

==== Final ====
11 June 1950	Benfica	3–3 (a.e.t.)	Bordeaux	Oeiras, Portugal
	Arsénio 3'; Corona 17'; Pascoal 56'		Doye 21', 36'; Persillon 43'	Stadium: Estádio Nacional do Jamor; Referee: Todjam (France)

18 June 1950 Replay	Benfica	2–1 (a.s.d.e.t.)	Bordeaux	Oeiras, Portugal
	Arsénio 90'; Julinho 146'		Kargu 8'	Stadium: Estádio Nacional do Jamor; Attendance: 25,000; Referee: Giacomo Bertolio (Italy)

=== Friendlies ===
10 July 1949	Nacional	1–1	Benfica	Funchal
				Stadium: Estádio dos Barreiros

14 July 1949	Marítimo	2–3	Benfica	Funchal

17 July 1949	Marítimo	4–2	Benfica	Funchal

1 September 1949 Manuel Jordão Cup	Benfica	3–0	Barreirense	Lisbon

5 September 1949	União Montemor	0–2	Benfica	Montemor-o-Novo
				Stadium: Parque Desportivo Municipal de Montemor-o-Novo

11 September 1949 Preparation Cup	Benfica	1–1	Atlético	Lisbon

18 September 1949 Preparation Cup	Benfica	0–1	Sporting	Lisbon
			89' Albano

22 September 1949 Costa Neves Cup	O Elvas	0–4	Benfica	Elvas
	Arsénio; Rosário			Stadium: Estádio Municipal de Elvas

23 September 1949	Benfica	0–1	Sporting	Lisbon
				Stadium: Estádio Nacional

25 September 1949 Preparation Cup	Benfica	3–1	Belenenses	Lisbon
	Corona 30'; Arsénio 53', 89'		Pinto de Almeida 65'

2 October 1949 Preparation Cup	Benfica	2–0	Oriental	Lisbon
	Arsénio 37', 51'

14 November 1949	CF Estremoz	2–10	Benfica	Estremoz
				Stadium: Campo Municipal de Estremoz

8 December 1949 Guilherme Espírito Santo Cup	Benfica	7–1	Académica	Lisbon
	Curado 11' (o.g.); Julinho 27'; Pipi 49'; Raul Pascoal 55'; Arsénio 59'; Teixeira 65'; Calado 80'		Rosa

25 December 1949 Aníbal Costa Rendas Cup	Vitória de Setúbal	1–1	Benfica	Setúbal
	Nunes 4'		Julinho 9'	Stadium: Campo dos Arcos

15 January 1950	Benfica	2–5	San Lorenzo	Lisbon
	Arsénio 2'; Rosário 90'		Silva 33', 53'; Uñate 36'; Pappa 47'; Martorell 80'	Stadium: Estádio Nacional

22 January 1950	Benfica	4–2	Racing	Lisbon
	Rosário 43', 62'; Pipi 67'; Julinho 80'		Simes 81'; Bravo 87'	Stadium: Estádio Nacional

13 February 1950; City of Silves Cup	Silves	1–5	Benfica	Silves
				Stadium: Estádio Francisco Vieira

1 April 1950	Salvaterrense	0–11	Benfica	Salvaterra de Magos
				Stadium: Parque de Jogos Clube Desportivo Salvaterrense

11 April 1950; 39th Anniversary of Barreirense	Barreirense	0–4	Benfica	Barreiro
				Stadium: Campo do Rossio

8 May 1950	Desportivo Castelo Branco	1–4	Benfica

9 May 1950	Os Gouveeenses	2–8	Benfica	Gouveia
				Stadium: Estádio Municipal do Farvão

28 May 1950; 28th May Cup	Benfica	3–2	Sporting	Braga
				Stadium: Estádio 1º de Maio

29 May 1950	Ovarense	3–4	Benfica	Ovar
				Stadium: Estádio Marques da Silva

== Player statistics ==
The squad for the season consisted of the players listed in the tables below, as well as staff member Ted Smith (manager).

Note 1: Note: Flags indicate national team as defined under FIFA eligibility rules. Players may hold more than one non-FIFA nationality.

Note 2: Players with squad numbers marked ‡ joined the club during the 1949-50 season via transfer, with more details in the following section.

No.	Pos	Nat	Player	Total		Primeira Divisão		Latin Cup	
No.	Pos	Nat	Player	Apps	Goals	Apps	Goals	Apps	Goals
1	GK	(Portugal) POR	Eduardo Gomes	2	0	2	0	0	0
1	GK	(Portugal) POR	José Bastos	9	0	6	0	3	0
1	GK	(Portugal) POR	Mário da Rosa	16	0	16	0	0	0
1	GK	(Portugal) POR	Rogério Contreiras	2	0	2	0	0	0
	DF	(Portugal) POR	António Lourenço	0	0	0	0	0	0
	DF	(Portugal) POR	António Manuel	0	0	0	0	0	0
2	DF	(Portugal) POR	Jacinto Marques	29	0	26	0	3	0
3	DF	(Portugal) POR	Félix Antunes	28	0	25	0	3	0
4	DF	(Portugal) POR	Joaquim Fernandes	29	0	26	0	3	0
	MF	(Portugal) POR	António Clemente	1	0	1	0	0	0
	FW	(Portugal) POR	Francisco Calado	0	0	0	0	0	0
	MF	(Portugal) POR	Francisco Ferreira	27	0	26	0	1	0
5	MF	(Portugal) POR	José da Costa	6	0	3	0	3	0
6	MF	(Portugal) POR	Francisco Moreira	29	1	26	1	3	0
	FW	(Portugal) POR	Alfredo Melão	11	6	11	6	0	0
	FW	(Portugal) POR	Diamantino Lima	1	1	1	1	0	0
	FW	(Portugal) POR	Espírito Santo	1	0	1	0	0	0
	FW	(Portugal) POR	Gil	8	7	8	7	0	0
	FW	(Portugal) POR	Teixeira	3	3	3	3	0	0
7	MF	(Portugal) POR	José Rosário	23	7	21	6	2	1
7	FW	(Portugal) POR	Raul Pascoal	8	6	7	5	1	1
8	FW	(Portugal) POR	Rogério Pipi	28	17	25	16	3	1
9	FW	(Portugal) POR	Julinho	25	29	22	28	3	1
10	FW	(Portugal) POR	Eduardo José Corona	10	1	7	0	3	1
11	FW	(Portugal) POR	Arsénio Duarte	29	13	26	10	3	3

== Transfers ==
=== In ===
Position	Player	From	Fee	Ref
DF	António Lourenço	Sacavenense	Undisclosed	
FW	Raul Pascoal	Portimonense	Undisclosed	

=== Out ===
Position	Player	To	Fee	Ref
GK	Pinto Machado	Naval	Undisclosed	
DF	Álvaro Gaspar Pinto	Alcanenense	Undisclosed	
DF	Rogério Fontes	Vitória de Setúbal	Undisclosed	
FW	Domingos Cadete	O Elvas	Undisclosed	
FW	Vítor Baptista da Costa	Sanjoanense	Undisclosed	
