= 1950 Latin Cup =

1950 club football tournament

Taça Latina 1950

Tournament details
- Host country: Portugal
- Dates: 10–18 June 1950
- Teams: 4 (from 1 confederation)
- Venue: 1 (in 1 host city)

Final positions
- Champions: Benfica (1st title)
- Runners-up: Bordeaux
- Third place: Atlético Madrid
- Fourth place: Lazio

Tournament statistics
- Matches played: 5
- Goals scored: 21 (4.2 per match)
- Top scorers: (Portugal) Arsénio Duarte; (France) André Doye; (France) Édouard Kargu; (3 goals each)

The 1950 Latin Cup (Portuguese: Taça Latina 1950) was the second edition of the annual Latin Cup which was played by clubs of the Southwest European nations of France, Italy, Portugal, and Spain. The tournament was hosted by Portugal, and Portuguese club Benfica was the winner of the tournament after defeating Bordeaux by a score of 2–1 in the final match replay after sudden death extra time.

== Participating teams ==
Team	Method of qualification	Previous appearances
Bordeaux	1949–50 French Division 1 champions	Debut
Lazio	1949–50 Serie A 4th place (Note: Juventus, AC Milan, and Inter Milan declined participation in the tournament due to the 1950 FIFA World Cup.)	Debut
Benfica	1949–50 Primeira Divisão champions	Debut
Atlético Madrid	1949–50 La Liga champions	Debut

== Venues ==
The host of the tournament was Portugal, and all matches were played in one host stadium.

Oeiras	1950 Latin Cup is located in Portugal
Estádio Nacional do Jamor	1950 Latin Cup is located in Portugal
Capacity: 37,500	1950 Latin Cup is located in Portugal
Estádio Nacional do Jamor	1950 Latin Cup is located in Portugal

== Tournament ==
=== Bracket ===
Semifinals
1 June – Oeiras
Bordeaux	4
Atlético Madrid	2
1 June – Oeiras
Benfica	3
Lazio	0

Final
11/18 June – Oeiras
Benfica (a.s.d.e.t.)	3/2
Bordeaux	3/1
Third place match
11 June – Oeiras
Atlético Madrid	2
Lazio	1

=== Semifinals ===
The first semi-final game was played between Benfica and Lazio. The Italians were considered favorites, given their triumph over the Spanish champion Atlético Madrid in the Teresa Herrera Trophy, won in preparation for the tournament. The Portuguese club scored first in the opening minutes, when Julinho opened the scoring. Rogério extended the lead for the home side, who scored their third goal in the second half through Arsenio.

The other semi-final, also played at the Estádio Nacional, pitted French champions Bordeaux against Spanish champions Atlético Madrid. Kargu opened the scoring for the French side with a free-kick, and Doye extended their lead before the end of the first half. Atlético, managed by Helenio Herrera, pulled one back through Ben Barek, who scored with his chest early in the second half. In the 77th minute, Atlético equalized through Carlsson, who capitalized on a cross from Olmedo, and with just two minutes remaining, when it seemed the game would end in a draw, Kargu scored his second goal, followed by a fourth for the French team, scored by Doye in the 90th minute.

10 June 1950
16:05

Bordeaux	4–2	Atlético Madrid
Kargu 16', 88'; Doye 44'; Babot 90' (o.g.)		48' Ben M'Barek; 77' Carlsson

Estádio Nacional do Jamor, Oeiras, Portugal
Referee: Paulo de Oliveira (Portugal)

Bordeaux	Atlético Madrid

GK	1	(France) Astresses (c)
DF	2	(France) Garriga
DF	3	(France) Swiatek
DF	4	(France) Mérignac
MF	5	(Morocco) M'Barek
MF	6	(France) Gallice
FW	7	(France) Persillon
FW	8	(France) Mustapha
FW	9	(France) Kargu
FW	10	(France) Doye
FW	11	(Netherlands) de Harder
Manager:
(France) André Gérard

GK	1	(France) Marcel Domingo
DF	2	(Spain) Farias
DF	3	(Spain) Babot
DF	4	(Spain) Lesmes
MF	5	(Spain) Hernández
MF	6	(Spain) Cuenca
FW	7	(Spain) Olmedo
FW	8	(Morocco) M’Barek
FW	9	(Spain) Pahiño
FW	10	(Sweden) Carlsson
FW	11	(Spain) Salvador Estruch
Treinador:
(Argentina) Helenio Herrera

10 June 1950
18:05

Benfica	3–0	Lazio
Rosário 7'; Pipi 27' (pen.); Arsénio 76'

Estádio Nacional do Jamor, Oeiras, Portugal
Referee: Julián Arqué (Spain)

Benfica	Lazio

GK	1	(Portugal) José Bastos
DF	2	(Portugal) Jacinto Marques
DF	3	(Portugal) Félix Antunes
DF	4	(Portugal) Joaquim Fernandes
MF	5	(Portugal) José da Costa
MF	6	(Portugal) Francisco Moreira (c)
FW	7	(Portugal) Rosário
FW	8	(Portugal) Arsénio
FW	9	(Portugal) Julinho
FW	10	(Portugal) Rogério Pipi
FW	11	(Portugal) Corona
Manager:
(England) Ted Smith

GK	1	(Italy) De Fazio
DF	2	(Italy) Antonazzi
DF	3	(Italy) Sandroni
DF	4	(Italy) Piacentini
MF	5	(Italy) Magrini
MF	6	(Italy) Montanari
FW	7	(Italy) Puccinelli
FW	8	(Italy) Trevisan
FW	9	(Paraguay) Arce
FW	10	(Argentina) Flamini
FW	11	(Hungary) Nyers
Manager:
(Italy) Mario Sperone

=== Third place match ===
After being eliminated in the semifinals, Lazio and Atlético Madrid played for third place. Both teams had met days before in the Teresa Herrera Trophy, and there had been several altercations between the two sides. In the eleventh minute, Ben M'Barek opened the scoring, but a few minutes later Piacentini and Carlsson were sent off after altercations. Escudero scored Atlético's second goal, receiving a pass from Ben M'Barek and shooting powerfully past Fioravanti. Lazio were reduced to nine men after Sementini was sent off for insulting the referee, and their reaction was to leave the field for a few minutes in protest. In the second half, Nyers reduced the deficit and the Spaniards were also reduced to nine men when Escudero was sent off, and the match ended 2–1, with the Madrid team in third and Lazio in fourth.

11 June 1950

Atlético Madrid	2–1	Lazio
Ben M'Barek 10'; Escudero 16'; Carlsson (red card); Escudero (red card)		Nyers 73'; Piacentini (red card); Sementini (red card)

Estádio Nacional do Jamor, Oeiras, Portugal
Referee: Gabriel Tordjmann (France)

Atlético Madrid	Lazio

GK	1	(Spain) Dauder
DF	2	(Spain) Tinte
DF	3	(Spain) Riera
DF	4	(Spain) Lesmes
MF	5	(Spain) Olmedo
MF	6	(Spain) Farias
FW	7	(Spain) Salvador Estruch
FW	8	(Morocco) M’Barek
FW	9	(Sweden) Carlsson
FW	10	(Spain) Agustín
FW	11	(Spain) Escudero
Manager:
(Argentina) Helenio Herrera

GK	1	(Italy) Fioravanti
DF	2	(Italy) Antonazzi
DF	3	(Italy) Spurio
DF	4	(Italy) Piacentini
MF	5	(Italy) Montanari
MF	6	(Italy) Sentimenti
FW	7	(Italy) Magrini
FW	8	(Italy) Penzo
FW	9	(Romania) Höfling
FW	10	(Argentina) Flamini
FW	11	(Hungary) Nyers
Manager:
(Italy) Mario Sperone

=== Final ===
Benfica and Bordeaux contested the final, in a game with high expectations. Benfica opened the scoring and extended its lead to 2–0, but the French side managed to turn the score around to 3–2 before halftime. Pascoal equalized early in the second half, and despite both teams creating several opportunities, there were no further goals. After regulation time, thirty minutes of extra time were played, maintaining the tie. The result led to a replay match.

11 June 1950

Benfica	3–3 (a.e.t.)	Bordeaux
Arsénio 3'; Corona 17'; Pascoal 56'		Doye 28', 39'; Persillon 43'

Estádio Nacional do Jamor, Oeiras, Portugal
Referee: Todjam (France)

GK	1	(Portugal) José de Bastos
DF	2	(Portugal) Félix Antunes
DF	3	(Portugal) Jacinto Marques
DF	4	(Portugal) Joaquim Fernandes
MF	5	(Portugal) José da Costa (c)
MF	6	(Portugal) Francisco Moreira
FW	7	(Portugal) Raul Pascoal
FW	8	(Portugal) Arsénio Duarte
FW	9	(Portugal) Julinho
FW	10	(Portugal) Eduardo José Corona
FW	11	(Portugal) Rogério Pipi
Manager:
(England) Ted Smith

GK	1	(France) Jean-Guy Astresses
DF	2	(France) Jean Swiatek
DF	3	(France) Georges Mérignac (c)
DF	4	(France) René Gallice
MF	5	(France) René Persillon
MF	6	(France) Guy Meynieu
FW	7	(Morocco) Ben Kaddour M'Barek
FW	8	(France) Manuel Garriga
FW	9	(France) André Doye
FW	10	(France) Édouard Kargu
FW	11	(France) Mustapha Ben M'Barek
Manager:
(France) André Gérard

=== Final replay ===
The following Sunday, again at the Estádio Nacional do Jamor, the replay match was held. In the first half, the visitors opened the scoring through Édouard Kargu. The French side maintained the advantage until near the end, with Benfica creating several opportunities but not managing to score, until, in the 89th minute, a counter-attack finished by Arsénio made it 1–1. The draw forced a new extra time, in which no goals were scored. With the score still tied, a second extra time began, this time with ten minutes in each half and with the golden goal rule. As the tie persisted, a third extra time was required. In the 146th minute of the game, Julinho scored a header to make it 2–1. After the goal, referee Bertolio blew the final whistle, giving the victory to Benfica at the end of a final that, in total, lasted 266 minutes.

18 June 1950

Benfica	2–1 (a.s.d.e.t.)	Bordeaux
Arsénio 90'; Julinho 146'		Kargu 8'

Estádio Nacional do Jamor, Oeiras, Portugal
Attendance: 25,000
Referee: Giacomo Bertolio (Italy)

GK	1	(Portugal) José de Bastos
DF	2	(Portugal) Jacinto Marques
DF	3	(Portugal) Félix Antunes
DF	4	(Portugal) Joaquim Fernandes
MF	5	(Portugal) José da Costa (c)
MF	6	(Portugal) Rosário
FW	7	(Portugal) Francisco Moreira
FW	8	(Portugal) Rogério Pipi
FW	9	(Portugal) Eduardo José Corona
FW	10	(Portugal) Julinho
FW	11	(Portugal) Arsénio Duarte
Manager:
(England) Ted Smith

GK	1	(France) Jean-Guy Astresses
DF	2	(France) Georges Mérignac (c)
DF	3	(France) Jean Swiatek
DF	4	(France) André Doye
MF	5	(France) Manuel Garriga
MF	6	(Morocco) Ben Kaddour M'Barek
FW	7	(France) René Persillon
FW	8	(France) Guy Meynieu
FW	9	(France) René Gallice
FW	10	(France) Mustapha Ben M'Barek
FW	11	(France) Édouard Kargu
Manager:
(France) André Gérard

1950 Latin Cup Champions
(Portugal)
Benfica
1st title

== Goalscorers ==
Rank	Player	Team	Goals
1	(Portugal) Arsénio Duarte	(Portugal) Benfica	3
1	(France) André Doye	(France) Bordeaux	3
1	(France) Édouard Kargu	(France) Bordeaux	3
2	(Morocco) Larbi Ben M'Barek	(Spain) Atlético Madrid	2
3	(Sweden) Henry Carlsson	(Spain) Atlético Madrid	1
3	(Spain) Adrián Escudero	(Spain) Atlético Madrid	1
3	(France) René Persillon	(France) Bordeaux	1
3	(Italy) Ferenc Nyers	(Italy) Lazio	1
3	(Portugal) Eduardo José Corona	(Portugal) Benfica	1
3	(Portugal) Raul Pascoal	(Portugal) Benfica	1
3	(Portugal) Rogério Pipi	(Portugal) Benfica	1
3	(Portugal) Rosário	(Portugal) Benfica	1
3	(Portugal) Julinho	(Portugal) Benfica	1
o.g.	(Spain) Juan Babot	(Spain) Atlético Madrid	1
