= List of FC Girondins de Bordeaux players =

This is a list of notable footballers who have played for FC Girondins de Bordeaux. Generally, this means players that have appeared in 100 or more first-class (league, Coupe de France, Coupe de la Ligue and European) matches for the club. However, some who played fewer matches are also included;those who fell short of 100 appearances but made significant contributions to the history of the club. For a full list of all Bordeaux players with Wikipedia articles (major or otherwise) see Category:FC Girondins de Bordeaux players.

Players are listed according to the date of their first professional contract signed with the club. Those whose nationality contains a link to their country's team (in blue) won full international caps, either whilst at Bordeaux or elsewhere. Appearances and goals are for competitive first-team matches only. Substitute appearances included.

== List of players ==
| Name | Nationality | Position | Bordeaux career | Apps | Goals | Notes |
|---|---|---|---|---|---|---|
| Gabriel Abossolo | Cameroon | DF/MF | 1958-1969 | 303 | 18 | |
| Kodjo Afanou | France | DF | 1995-2006 | 255 | 4 | |
| Hervé Alicarte | France | DF | 1998-2004 | 100 | 9 | |
| Alejandro Alonso | Argentina | MF | 2005-2008 | 103 | 4 | |
| Henri Arnaudeau | France | LW | 1940-1948 1953-1954 | 168 | 83 | |
| Jean Audebert | France | DF | 1952-1962 | 180 | 15 | |
| Patrice Barrat | France | DF/MF | 1972-1976 | 146 | 0 | |
| Bruno Basto | Portugal | LB | 2000-2004 | 158 | 0 | |
| Patrick Battiston | France | DF | 1983-1987 1989-1991 | 255 | 14 | |
| Laurent Batlles | France | MF | 1999-2002 | 101 | 6 | |
| Bernard Baudet | France | DF/MF | 1959-1969 | 258 | 30 | |
| David Bellion | France | FW | 2007-2014 | 156 | 27 | |
| Mustapha Ben M'Barek | France | RB | 1946-1951 | 126 | 19 | |
| Philippe Bergeroo | France | GK | 1971-1978 | 149 | 0 | |
| Pierre Bernard | France | GK | 1952-1957 | 145 | 0 | |
| André Biyogo Poko | Gabon | MF | 2011-2016 | 100 | 4 | |
| Jérôme Bonnissel | France | LB | 1999-2003 | 113 | 0 | |
| François Bracci | France | LB | 1980-1983 | 139 | 6 | |
| Guy Calleja | France | MF | 1956-1969 | 445 | 29 | |
| Raymond Camus | France | DF/MF | 1973-1979 | 133 | 0 | |
| Fernando Cavenaghi | Argentina | FW | 2007-2010 | 111 | 46 | |
| Cédric Carrasso | France | GK | 2009- | 306 | 0 | |
| Jean-Claude Casties | France | DF/MF | 1956-1963 | 119 | 7 | |
| Matthieu Chalmé | France | RB | 2007-2014 | 167 | 1 | |
| Marouane Chamakh | Morocco | FW | 2003-2010 | 301 | 76 | |
| André Chorda | France | LB | 1962-1969 | 257 | 15 | |
| Michaël Ciani | France | DF | 2009-2012 | 116 | 10 | |
| Eduardo Costa | Brazil | MF | 2001-2004 | 122 | 7 | |
| Didier Couécou | France | MF/FW | 1962-1969 1974-1976 | 224 | 86 | |
| Laurent Croci | France | DF/MF | 1992-1996 | 141 | 5 | |
| Jean-Claude Darecheville | France | FW | 2002-2007 | 166 | 49 | |
| Héctor De Bourgoing | Argentina France | RW | 1963-1969 | 163 | 72 | Dual international |
| Bertus de Harder | Netherlands | LW | 1949-1957 | 224 | 95 | |
| Jep de Kubber | Netherlands | FB | 1950-1956 | 160 | 4 | |
| Christian Delachet | France | GK | 1978-1984 | 193 | 0 | |
| Didier Desremeaux | France | DF | 1967-1972 | 153 | 7 | |
| Cheikh Diabaté | Mali | FW | 2008-2016 | 152 | 66 | |
| Lassina Diabaté | Ivory Coast | MF | 1997-2001 | 124 | 3 | |
| Alou Diarra | France | MF | 2007-2011 | 164 | 12 | |
| Jean-Luc Dogon | France | DF | 1989-1996 | 255 | 21 | |
| Jean-François Domergue | France | DF/MF | 1975-1980 | 117 | 11 | |
| André Doye | France | LW | 1948-1956 | 150 | 31 | |
| Dominique Dropsy | France | GK | 1984-1989 | 241 | 0 | |
| Jean-Claude Dubouil | France | DF | 1964-1967 1970-1975 | 184 | 3 | |
| Christophe Dugarry | France | FW | 1988-1996 2000-2002 | 319 | 61 | |
| Philippe Fargeon | France | FW | 1986-1988 1990-1992 | 122 | 38 | |
| Julien Faubert | France | MF | 2004-2007 2013-2015 | 177 | 15 | |
| Pascal Feindouno | Guinea | MF | 1998-2004 | 132 | 21 | |
| Jean-Marc Ferreri | France | MF | 1986-1991 | 207 | 49 | |
| Juan Pablo Francia | Argentina | MF | 2001-2007 | 109 | 14 | |
| Jean Gallice | France | MF/FW | 1971-1977 | 219 | 53 | His father, René Gallice, also played for Bordeaux |
| René Gallice | France | CH | 1938-1955 | 390 | 33 | His son, Jean Gallice, also played for Bordeaux |
| Manuel Garriga | France | CH | 1946-1956 | 324 | 19 | |
| Albert Gemmrich | France | FW | 1979-1982 | 109 | 43 | |
| René Girard | France | MF | 1980-1988 | 303 | 25 | |
| Alain Giresse | France | MF | 1970-1986 | 592 | 179 | |
| Aimé Gori | France | MF/FW | 1960-1964 | 146 | 63 | |
| Philippe Goubet | France | RW | 1967-1979 | 225 | 18 | |
| Yoan Gouffran | France | LW | 2008-2013 | 181 | 40 | |
| Yoann Gourcuff | France | MF | 2008-2010 | 96 | 24 | |
| Georges Grabowski | France | FB | 1969-1972 | 106 | 5 | |
| François Grenet | France | DF | 1992-2001 | 247 | 4 | |
| Jacques Grimponon | France | LB | 1953-1957 | 127 | 2 | |
| Roland Guillas | France | IF | 1954-1960 1964-1967 | 277 | 52 | |
| Henrique | Brazil | DF | 2005-2014 | 208 | 14 | |
| Gaëtan Huard | France | GK | 1991-1996 | 197 | 0 | |
| Zygmunt Janczewski | France | RB | 1953-1957 | 149 | 1 | |
| David Jemmali | Tunisia | RB | 1997-2008 | 312 | 6 | |
| Franck Jurietti | France | LB | 2003-2010 | 223 | 0 | |
| Jussiê | Brazil | MF/FW | 2007-2016 | 250 | 45 | |
| Édouard Kargulewicz | France | CF | 1947-1958 | 390 | 166 | Born in Poland and known as Édouard Kargu in France |
| Bernard Lacombe | France | FW | 1979-1987 | 296 | 137 | |
| Lilian Laslandes | France | FW | 1997-2001 2004-2006 | 236 | 70 | |
| Bixente Lizarazu | France | LB | 1988-1996 | 294 | 26 | |
| Xercès Louis | France | MF | 1957-1960 | 105 | 11 | |
| Philippe Lucas | France | MF | 1992-1996 | 142 | 0 | |
| Florian Marange | France | FB | 2004-2009 2010-2013 | 114 | 1 | |
| Mariano | Brazil | FB | 2012-2015 | 143 | 4 | |
| Antonio Martínez | Spain | MF | 1981-1985 | 139 | 9 | Known as Antoine Martinez in France |
| Nicolas Maurice-Belay | France | MF | 2011- | 187 | 11 | |
| Rio Mavuba | France | MF | 2003-2007 | 154 | 1 | |
| Fernando Menegazzo | Brazil | MF | 2005-2011 | 241 | 23 | |
| Camel Meriem | France | MF | 2002-2005 | 101 | 9 | |
| Guy Meynieu | France | U | 1949-1954 | 129 | 12 | |
| Johan Micoud | France | MF | 1996-2000 2006-2008 | 253 | 50 | |
| Gilbert Moevi | Togo | RB | 1959-1967 | 230 | 4 | |
| Christian Montes | France | GK | 1960-1971 1975-1976 | 194 | 0 | |
| Dieter Müller | West Germany | FW | 1982-1985 | 116 | 59 | |
| Franciso Navarro | Spain | DF | 1959-1966 | 155 | 5 | |
| Gérard Papin | France | RB | 1967-1974 | 238 | 3 | |
| Pauleta | Portugal | FW | 2000-2004 | 130 | 91 | |
| Michel Pavon | France | MF | 1996-2000 | 169 | 7 | |
| Robert Péri | France | DF | 1966-1969 1971-1972 | 131 | 6 | |
| René Persillon | France | RW | 1942-1954 | 261 | 62 | |
| Claude Petyt | France | FW | 1968-1972 | 135 | 26 | |
| Marc Planus | France | DF | 2001-2015 | 381 | 9 | |
| Jaroslav Plašil | Czech Republic | MF | 2009- | 300 | 20 | |
| Ulrich Ramé | France | GK | 1997-2011 | 525 | 0 | |
| Jean-Claude Ranouil | France | GK | 1955-1966 | 233 | 0 | |
| Claude Rey | France | DF | 1959-1967 | 270 | 1 | |
| Pierre Rigoni | France | GK | 1970-1974 | 129 | 0 | |
| Laurent Robuschi | France | LW | 1959-1967 | 299 | 131 | |
| Alain Roche | France | DF | 1985-1989 2000-2002 | 214 | 7 | |
| Diego Rolán | Uruguay | FW | 2013- | 149 | 38 | |
| Gernot Rohr | West Germany | DF | 1977-1989 | 430 | 14 | |
| Carlos Ruiter | Brazil | FW | 1966-1972 | 147 | 58 | |
| Stian Rode Gregersen | Norway | DF | 2021–2024 | 73 | 2 | |
| Henri Saivet | Senegal | MF | 2007-2016 | 178 | 23 | |
| Lamine Sané | Senegal | DF/MF | 2009-2016 | 240 | 11 | |
| Niša Saveljić | (Socialist Federal Republic of Yugoslavia) Yugoslavia | SW | 1997-2001 | 105 | 3 | |
| Didier Sénac | France | DF | 1987-1995 | 298 | 16 | |
| Grégory Sertic | France | MF | 2008-2017 | 181 | 7 | |
| Gérard Soler | France | FW | 1979-1982 | 109 | 22 | |
| David Sommeil | France | DF | 2000-2003 | 105 | 3 | Represented Guadeloupe in unofficial tournaments |
| Léonard Specht | France | DF | 1982-1987 | 203 | 8 | |
| Janek Świątek | France | CH | 1944-1954 | 246 | 3 | Born in Poland and known as Jean Swiatek in France |
| Yves Teixer | France | MF | 1961-1965 1966-1972 | 133 | 21 | |
| Jean-Christophe Thouvenel | France | RB | 1979-1991 | 489 | 6 | |
| Jean Tigana | France | MF | 1981-1989 | 324 | 14 | |
| Jean-Pierre Tokoto | Cameroon | FW | 1972-1975 1977-1978 | 139 | 31 | |
| Abdou Traoré | Mali | MF | 2008- | 126 | 23 | |
| Benoît Trémoulinas | France | FB | 2007-2013 | 220 | 9 | |
| Marius Trésor | France | DF | 1980-1984 | 116 | 5 | |
| Thierry Tusseau | France | LB | 1983-1986 | 116 | 6 | |
| Christian Villenave | France | GK | 1947-1953 | 129 | 0 | |
| Zoran Vujović | (Socialist Federal Republic of Yugoslavia) Yugoslavia | DF | 1986-1989 | 107 | 4 | His twin brother, Zlatko Vujović, also played for Bordeaux |
| Wendel | Brazil | MF | 2006-2011 | 207 | 44 | |
| Sylvain Wiltord | France | FW | 1997-2000 | 136 | 59 | |
| Édouard Wojciak | France | MF/FW | 1967-1973 | 204 | 45 | |
| Raymond Wozniesko | France | LW | 1952-1959 | 170 | 51 | |
| Zinedine Zidane | France | MF | 1992-1996 | 174 | 34 | |
