= 1952 Coupe de France final =

- Event: 1951–52 Coupe de France
Nice	Bordeaux
5	3
- Date: 4 May 1952
- Venue: Olympique Yves-du-Manoir, Colombes
- Referee: Jacques Devillers
- Attendance: 61,485

The 1952 Coupe de France final was a football match held at Stade Olympique Yves-du-Manoir, Colombes on May 4, 1952, that saw OGC Nice defeat FC Girondins de Bordeaux 5–3 with goals by Victor Nuremberg, Luis Carniglia, Jean Belver, Abdelaziz Ben Tifour and Georges Césari.

== Match details ==
4 May 1952

Nice	5–3	Bordeaux
Nurenberg 10'; Carniglia 12'; Belver 32'; Ben Tifour 61'; Césari 65'		Baillot 12', 55'; Kargu 40'

Stade Olympique Yves-du-Manoir, Colombes
Attendance: 61,485
Referee: Jacques Devilliers

GK	(France) Marcel Domingo
DF	(Algeria) Mohamed Firoud
DF	(Argentina) Hector Cesar Gonzales
DF	(France) Antoine Bonifaci
DF	(France) Guy Poitevin
MF	(France) Jean Belver	(c)
MF	(France) Jean Courteaux
FW	(Luxembourg) Victor Nurenberg
FW	(France) Georges Césari
FW	(Argentina) Luis Carniglia
FW	(Algeria) Abdelaziz Ben Tifour
Manager:
(France) Numa Andoire Assistant Referees: Fourth Official:

GK	(France) Christian Villenave
DF	(France) Guy Meynieu
DF	(France) Jean Swiatek	(c)
DF	(France) René Gallice
DF	(France) Manuel Garriga
MF	(Netherlands) Jan De Kubber
MF	(France) Henri Baillot
FW	(France) René Persillon
FW	(France) Edouard Kargu
FW	(France) André Doye
FW	(Netherlands) Lambertus De Harder
Manager:
(France) André Gérard

== See also ==
- 1951–52 Coupe de France
