= 1952 Taça de Portugal final =

- Event: 1951–52 Taça de Portugal
Benfica	Sporting CP
5	4
- Date: 15 June 1952
- Venue: Estádio Nacional, Oeiras
- Referee: Reis Santos (Santarém)

The 1952 Taça de Portugal final was the final match of the 1951–52 Taça de Portugal, the 12th season of the Taça de Portugal, the premier Portuguese football cup competition organized by the Portuguese Football Federation (FPF). The match was played on 15 June 1952 at the Estádio Nacional in Oeiras, and opposed two Primeira Liga sides: Benfica and Sporting CP. Benfica defeated Sporting CP 5–4 to claim their sixth Taça de Portugal.

== Match ==
=== Details ===
15 June 1952

Benfica	5–4	Sporting CP
Pipi 11' (pen.), 69', 90'; Corona 49'; Águas 49'		Albano 9' (pen.); Rola 51', 71'; Martins 55'

Estádio Nacional, Oeiras
Referee: Reis Santos (Santarém)

Benfica	Sporting CP

GK	1	(Portugal) José de Bastos
DF		(Portugal) Joaquim Fernandes
DF		(Portugal) Artur Santos
DF		(Portugal) Félix Antunes
MF		(Portugal) Francisco Ferreira (c)
MF		(Portugal) Eduardo Corona
MF		(Portugal) Rosário
MF		(Portugal) Rogério Pipi
MF		(Portugal) Francisco Moreira
FW		(Portugal) Arsénio Duarte
FW		(Portugal) José Águas
Substitutes:
Manager:
(Portugal) Cândido Tavares

GK	1	(Portugal) Carlos Gomes
DF		(Portugal) Juvenal Silva
DF		(Portugal) Joaquim Pacheco
DF		(Portugal) Manuel Passos (c)
MF		(Portugal) Veríssimo Alves
MF		(Portugal) Juca
FW		(Portugal) Pacheco Nobre
FW		(Portugal) Albano
FW		(Portugal) José Travassos
FW		(Portugal) João Martins
FW		(Portugal) Rola
Substitutes:
Manager:
(England) Randolph Galloway

1951–52 Taça de Portugal Winners
Benfica
6th Title

Match officials

- Assistant referees:
- Fourth official:

Match rules

- 90 minutes.

== See also ==
- Derby de Lisboa
