= Manuel Garriga (French footballer) =

French footballer (1926–1980)

Personal information
- Date of birth: 7 February 1926
- Place of birth: Sidi Bel Abbès, Algeria
- Date of death: 3 March 1980 (aged 54)
- Place of death: Bordeaux, France
- Height: 1.80 m (5 ft 11 in)
- Position: Defender

Senior career*
Years	Team	Apps	(Gls)
1945–1946	Toulon	24	(2)
1946–1956	Bordeaux	325	(19)
1947	→ Clermont (on loan)	19	(3)
1956–1957	CA Paris		
1957–1961	Bastidienne		

International career
1950	France	1	(0)
1954	France B	2	(0)
- * Club domestic league appearances and goals

Manuel Garriga (7 February 1926 – 3 March 1980) was an Algerian-born French footballer who played as a defender for Bordeaux between 1946 and 1956. He also made one appearance for the France national team in 1950. He was the central defender of the great Girondins team of the early 1950s, which won the 1949–50 French Division 1 and reached two Coupe de France finals in 1952 and 1955.

== Club career ==
Born on 7 February 1926 in Sidi Bel Abbès, Algeria, Garriga was still a child when his family settled in France, where he began his football career with Toulon in 1945, aged 19, with whom he played for just one season as he was then signed by Bordeaux, then in French First Division, where he remained for a decade, from 1946 until 1956. In the first half of his first season, he only scored 2 goals in 16 matches, so in December, he was loaned to Clermont, where he scored 9 goals in 22 matches. Girondins ended up being relegated at the end of that season, but Garriga helped them return to the top-flight two seasons later, in 1948.

Together with Henri Baillot, Joop de Kubber, and André Doye, Garriga was a member of the great Girondins team of the early 1950s, which won the 1949–50 French Division 1, and then reached the finals of Coupe de France titles in 1952 and 1955, starting in both of them, which ended in losses to Nice (5–3) and Lille (5–2), respectively. On 11 June 1950, he started in the final of the 1950 Latin Cup, the forerunner of the European Cup, which ended in a 2–1 loss to Benfica. In total, he scored 19 goals in 325 official matches for Girondins.

In 1956, Garriga joined CA Paris, playing 33 matches in his first (and only) season there, as he then joined Bastidienne, with whom he played for four years, until 1961, when he retired, aged 35.

== International career ==
On 1 November 1950, the 24-year-old Garriga earned his first (and only) international cap for France in a friendly match against Belgium at the Colombes, which ended in a 3–3 draw.

He also made two appearances for the French B team in 1954, both in the 1953–58 Mediterranean Cup, including a 2–0 loss to the eventual champions Spain B on 30 May.

== Death ==
After retiring from football, Garriga was hired as a docker at the port of Bordeaux, where he died at his workplace on 3 March 1980, at the age of 54, crushed by a falling container. (Note: Some sources wrongly state that he died in 1982.)

== Honours ==
Bordeaux

- Ligue 1: 1949–50; runner-up 1951–52
- Coupe de France runner-up: 1952, 1955
- Latin Cup runner-up: 1950
