= Rosário (footballer) =

Portuguese footballer (1924–2015)

Personal information
- Full name: José David Rosário da Costa
- Date of birth: 15 August 1924
- Place of birth: Cartaxo, Portugal
- Date of death: 29 May 2015 (aged 90)
- Place of death: Lisbon, Portugal
- Position: Forward

Senior career*
Years	Team	Apps	(Gls)
1945–1946	Cartaxo		
1946–1948	Elvas	26	(16)
1948–1954	Benfica	76	(18)
1954–1957	Atlético	36	(6)
Total		138	(40)
- * Club domestic league appearances and goals

José David Rosário da Costa (15 August 1924 – 29 May 2015), known just as Rosário, was a Portuguese footballer who played as a forward.

He represented clubs like Cartaxo, Elvas and Atlético, but was most known for his six-year spell at Benfica, where he won six major titles, including the Latin Cup.

== Career ==
Born in Porto de Muge, Cartaxo, Rosário started playing at SL Cartaxo, before moving to SL Elvas. He signed with Benfica in 1948, and made his debut on 19 September, against Olhanense. In his first year, he competed with Corona, Espírito Santo and Rogério Pipi, so his playing time was limited to 12 games. His second season was better, as he assumed a starting role alongside Julinho and Corona, helping the club win the league and the Latin Cup. Rosário kept his place in the first team in the following three years, partnering with José Águas and Rogério, to win three Portuguese Cups.

In his final season at Benfica, 1953–54, he lost his place to Palmeiro, and played only three games, his last on 4 January 1954, against Académica de Coimbra. Afterwards, he represented Atlético until 1957. He died on 29 May 2015, at age 90.

== Honours ==
Benfica

- Primeira Divisão: 1949–50
- Taça de Portugal: 1948–49, 1950–51, 1951–52, 1952–53
- Latin Cup: 1950
