= Georges Mérignac =

New Caledonian footballer (born 1921)

Personal information
- Date of birth: 10 July 1921
- Place of birth: Poya, New Caledonia
- Date of death: 30 October 1992 (aged 71)
- Position: Central defender

Youth career
- Indépendante de Nouméa

Senior career*
Years	Team	Apps	(Gls)
- Indépendante de Nouméa
1946–1953	Bordeaux	158	(1)
Total		158	(1)

International career
1939	New Caledonia		

Managerial career
- New Caledonia
- * Club domestic league appearances and goals

Georges Mérignac (10 July 1921 – 30 October 1992) was a New Caledonian footballer who played as a central-defender.

== Early life ==
Born in Poya, New Caledonia, to a Melanesian mother and European father, Mérignac spent his childhood between Poya and Nouméa, where he took an interest in tennis, boxing, athletics and football. He worked as a farmer during his time on the islands.

== Club career ==
Having played football in his native New Caledonia with Indépendante de Nouméa, Mérignac enlisted in the Free French Forces in September 1941, and took part in the Battle of Bir Hakeim in Libya the following year. It was here that he met René Gallice, who had played for French side Bordeaux before the war. Following the conclusion of the Second World War in 1945, Gallice suggested to Bordeaux's coaches, who were looking for a new central-defender, that they sign Mérignac, and the New Caledonian joined the club the following year.

Despite being relegated in his first season with the club, he spent two seasons in the French Division 2, before returning to the French Division 1 for the 1949–50 season, in which Bordeaux won the title. In the same season, he featured in the Latin Cup, where Bordeaux lost in the final to Portuguese side Benfica after an extra-time replay loss following a draw in the first game. He retired in 1953.

== International career ==
Mérignac represented the New Caledonia national football team in 1939.

== Coaching career ==
Following his retirement and return to New Caledonia, he managed the national football team.

== Death ==
Mérignac died in October 1992. In 2007, a sports complex in Tina-sur-Mer in the capital of New Caledonia, Nouméa, was named in his honour.

== Career statistics ==
=== Club ===
Appearances and goals by club, season and competition
Club	Season	League			Coupe de France		Other		Total	
Club	Season	Division	Apps	Goals	Apps	Goals	Apps	Goals	Apps	Goals
Bordeaux	1946–47	French Division 1	2	0	0	0	0	0	2	0
Bordeaux	1947–48	French Division 2	32	0	4	0	0	0	36	0
Bordeaux	1948–49	French Division 2	30	0	1	0	0	0	31	0
Bordeaux	1949–50	French Division 1	32	1	0	0	3 (Note: Appearances in the Latin Cup)	0	35	1
Bordeaux	1950–51	French Division 1	24	0	1	0	0	0	25	0
Bordeaux	1951–52	French Division 1	19	0	3	0	0	0	22	0
Bordeaux	1952–53	French Division 1	19	0	1	0	0	0	20	0
Career total			158	1	10	0	3	0	171	1
