= 1949 Taça de Portugal final =

- Event: 1948–49 Taça de Portugal
Atlético CP	Benfica
1	2
- Date: 12 June 1949
- Venue: Estádio Nacional, Oeiras
- Referee: Paulo de Oliveira (Santarém)

The 1949 Taça de Portugal final was the final match of the 1948–49 Taça de Portugal, the 10th season of the Taça de Portugal, the premier Portuguese football cup competition organized by the Portuguese Football Federation (FPF). The match was played on 12 June 1949 at the Estádio Nacional in Oeiras, and opposed two Primeira Liga sides: Atlético CP and Benfica. Benfica defeated Atlético CP 2–1 to claim their fourth Taça de Portugal.

== Match ==
=== Details ===
12 June 1949

Atlético CP	1–2	Benfica
Martinho 90'		Corona 78'; Pipi 80'

Estádio Nacional, Oeiras
Referee: Paulo de Oliveira (Santarém)

Atlético CP	Benfica

GK	1	(Portugal) Francisco Correia
DF		(Portugal) Abreu
DF		(Portugal) José Lopes
DF		(Portugal) Baptista
MF		(Portugal) Gregório Santos (c)
MF		(Portugal) Morais
FW		(Portugal) Henrique David
FW		(Portugal) Carlo Martinho
FW		(Portugal) Caninhas
FW		(Portugal) Armindo Silva
FW		(Portugal) Lopes Carneiro
Substitutes:
Manager:
(Portugal) Pedro Areso

GK	1	(Portugal) Rogério Contreiras
DF		(Portugal) Félix Antunes
DF		(Portugal) Joaquim Fernandes
DF		(Portugal) Jacinto Marques
MF		(Portugal) Rogério Pipi
MF		(Portugal) Francisco Moreira
MF		(Portugal) Francisco Ferreira (c)
MF		(Portugal) Eduardo Corona
FW		(Portugal) Guilherme Espírito Santo
FW		(Portugal) Arsénio Duarte
FW		(Portugal) Alfredo Melão
Substitutes:
Manager:
(England) Ted Smith

1948–49 Taça de Portugal Winners
Benfica
4th Title

Match officials

- Assistant referees:
- Fourth official:

Match rules

- 90 minutes.
