= 1951 Taça de Portugal final =

- Event: 1950–51 Taça de Portugal
Académica	Benfica
1	5
- Date: 10 June 1951
- Venue: Estádio Nacional, Oeiras
- Referee: Paulo de Oliveira (Santarém)

The 1951 Taça de Portugal final was the final match of the 1950–51 Taça de Portugal, the 11th season of the Taça de Portugal, the premier Portuguese football cup competition organized by the Portuguese Football Federation (FPF). The match was played on 10 June 1951 at the Estádio Nacional in Oeiras, and opposed two Primeira Liga sides: Académica and Benfica. Benfica defeated Académica 5–1 to claim their fifth Taça de Portugal.

== Match ==
=== Details ===
10 June 1951

Académica	1–5	Benfica
Macedo		Arsénio 13'; Pipi 7', 55', 63', 77'

Estádio Nacional, Oeiras
Referee: Paulo de Oliveira (Santarém)

Académica	Benfica

GK	1	(Portugal) Manuel Capela
DF		(Portugal) Joaquim Branco
DF		(Portugal) António Melo
DF		(Portugal) José Miguel
MF		(Portugal) Pedro Azeredo
MF		(Portugal) Mário Torres
FW		(Portugal) Bentes
FW		(Portugal) Álvaro Duarte
FW		(Portugal) Rui Gil
FW		(Portugal) João Macedo
FW		(Portugal) Nana (c)
Substitutes:
Manager:
(Argentina) Oscar Tellechea

GK	1	(Portugal) José Bastos
DF		(Portugal) Félix Antunes
DF		(Portugal) Artur Santos
DF		(Portugal) Joaquim Fernandes
MF		(Portugal) Rosário
MF		(Portugal) Rogério Pipi
MF		(Portugal) Francisco Moreira
MF		(Portugal) Eduardo Corona
MF		(Portugal) Francisco Ferreira (c)
FW		(Portugal) José Águas
FW		(Portugal) Arsénio Duarte
Substitutes:
Manager:
(England) Ted Smith

1950–51 Taça de Portugal Winners
Benfica
5th Title

Match officials

- Assistant referees:
- Fourth official:

Match rules

- 90 minutes.
