= Jacinto Marques =

Portuguese footballer (1921–2000)

Personal information
- Full name: Jacinto do Carmo Marques
- Date of birth: 1 November 1921
- Place of birth: Cova da Piedade, Portugal
- Date of death: 7 October 2000 (aged 78)
- Position: Defender

Senior career*
Years	Team	Apps	(Gls)
1943–1957	Benfica	202	(0)
Total		202	(0)
- * Club domestic league appearances and goals

Jacinto do Carmo Marques (1 November 1921 – 7 October 2000) was a Portuguese footballer who played as defender. He represented Benfica during 14 seasons, making over 250 appearances for them and winning nine major titles, including the Latin Cup.

== Career ==
Born in Cova da Piedade, Almada, Marques arrived at Benfica in 1943 at age 21, making his debut on the 28 November against Vitória de Setúbal. In his first two seasons, he played less than a handful of games in the Primeira Divisão, but starting in 1945, he entered the first team, alongside Francisco Ferreira and Francisco Moreira. He held a place in the starting eleven until 1951, making upwards of 130 appearances, and winning the league and the Latin Cup in 1950.

The next three years, Marques played only sparingly and missed 1953–54 season due to injury. He returned in 1954, to play beside Ângelo Martins in Benfica's defence, helping them win two more league titles in 1954–55 and 1956–57, retiring in the latter season, after 251 appearances in all competitions. Marques died on 7 October 2000, at the age of 78.

== Honours ==
Benfica

- Primeira Divisão: 1944–45, 1949–50, 1954–55, 1956–57
- Taça de Portugal: 1948–49, 1950–51, 1954–55, 1956–57
- Latin Cup: 1949–50
