= Alfredo Melão =

Portuguese footballer

Personal information
- Full name: Alfredo Gourgel Pereira Melão
- Date of birth: 21 June 1921
- Place of birth: Portugal
- Date of death: 30 January 1980 (aged 58)
- Place of death: Portugal
- Position: Forward

Senior career*
Years	Team	Apps	(Gls)
1946–1951	Benfica	61	(28)
1951–1954	Vitória de Setúbal	29	(7)
- * Club domestic league appearances and goals

Alfredo Gourgel Pereira Melão (21 June 1921 – 30 January 1980), is a former Portuguese footballer who played as a forward.

He was most known for his short four-year spell at Benfica, where he won one Primeira Liga and two Portuguese Cup.

== Career ==
Born in Portugal, from Angolan parents, Melão joined Benfica in 1946, making his debut on 8 December in a match against Vitória de Guimarães. He battled with Rogério Pipi, Arsénio and Julinho for playing time, but only collected 9 appearances in his first year. In his second season, he double his playing time, and scored 11 goals, but was still behind the attacking trio in the pecking order. He won his first title in the following season, helping Benfica win the Taça de Portugal, featuring in the 1949 Taça de Portugal Final with Atlético CP.

Melão continued to collect honours in 1949–50, winning his first league title after contributing with 6 goals in 11 matches. With another Portuguese Cup in 1950–51, Melão ended his Benfica career with 73 games and 34 goals, moving on to represent Vitória de Setúbal.

== Honours ==
Benfica

- Primeira Divisão: 1949–50
- Taça de Portugal: 1948–49, 1950–51
