= José Bastos =

Portuguese footballer (1929–2020)

Personal information
- Full name: José Manuel de Bastos
- Date of birth: 17 October 1929
- Place of birth: Albergaria-a-Velha, Portugal
- Date of death: 24 November 2020 (aged 91)
- Place of death: Cascais, Portugal
- Position: Goalkeeper

Youth career
- Benfica

Senior career*
| Years | Team | Apps | (Gls) |
| 1949–1961 | Benfica | 142 | (0) |
| 1959–1961 | → Atlético Clube de Portugal (loan) | 25 | (0) |
| 1961–1962 | Beira-Mar | 23 | (0) |
| 1962–1963 | Atlético Clube de Portugal | 8 | (0) |
| Total | | 198 | (0) |

Managerial career
- 1978–1980: Estoril–Praia
- * Club domestic league appearances and goals

José Manuel de Bastos (17 October 1929 – 24 November 2020) was a Portuguese footballer who played as goalkeeper. He joined Benfica as a youth and became their youngest ever goalkeeper upon his first team debut in 1950. Bastos played in their 1950 Latin Cup victory over Bordeaux and became the last surviving player from that game. He remained at Benfica until 1961, occasionally losing his first team spot, during which time the team won three Primeira Divisão titles and five Taça de Portugal cups. Bastos afterwards spent short spells with Beira-Mar and Atlético Clube de Portugal. From 1978 to 1980 he was manager of Estoril–Praia.

== Early life ==
Born in Albergaria-a-Velha, Bastos was a keen athlete, participating in the high jump (jumping 1.75 metres (5.7 ft)) and running events. He later turned to football and played for the Desportivo de Castelo and Benfica youth teams. He initially went for trials at Benfica as a field player among 500 other children, but when the chosen goalkeeper was injured he took over and was selected.

== Benfica career ==
Bastos was promoted to the Benfica first team in 1949 and beat Rosa for the position, making his debut on 12 March 1950, against Lusitano in an eventual league triumph. He was the youngest goalkeeper to play for Benfica until José Moreira in 2002. Bastos played in goal in Benfica's 18 June 1950 Latin Cup victory over Bordeaux at the Estádio Nacional.

Bastos held the goalkeeper's position at Benfica until 1954, when Alberto da Costa Pereira replaced him. After two seasons as back-up, Bastos regained his place in 1956–57, but lost it again, now permanently during the 1958–59 season. He went on loan to Atlético Clube de Portugal by order of Béla Guttmann, and made his last appearance for Benfica on 16 April 1961, in the Taça de Portugal match with Olhanense. During his Benfica career Bastos made 196 appearances and was part of a team that won three national championships and five Taça de Portugal cups.

== Later career and life ==
After Benfica, Bastos played for Beira-Mar and Atlético. From mid 1978 to 1980, he managed Estoril–Praia. Bastos died on 24 November 2020, at age 91. He was the last surviving player of the 1950 Latin Cup-winning team.

== Honours ==
Benfica

- Primeira Divisão: 1949–50, 1954–55, 1956–57
- Taça de Portugal: 1950–51, 1951–52, 1952–53, 1956–57, 1958–59
- Latin Cup: 1950
