= Fernandes (footballer, born 1926) =

Portuguese footballer (1926–2009)

Personal information
- Full name: Joaquim Fernandes da Silva
- Date of birth: 1 June 1926
- Place of birth: Lisbon, Portugal
- Date of death: 25 February 2009 (aged 82)
- Position: Defender

Youth career
- 1943–1945: Benfica

Senior career*
Years	Team	Apps	(Gls)
1945–1954	Benfica	191	(1)
1955–1957	Torreense	61	(1)
Total		252	(2)
- * Club domestic league appearances and goals

Joaquim Fernandes da Silva (1 June 1926 – 25 February 2009) was a Portuguese footballer who played as defender.

He represented Benfica during nine seasons, making over 220 appearances for them and winning six major titles, including the Latin Cup.

== Career ==
Born in Lisbon, Fernandes joined Benfica youth academy at age 17. He graduated in 1945, but only made his debut on 9 June 1946, in the 3–2 loss against Atlético CP for the quarter-finals of the Taça de Portugal. The following season, he started alongside Félix Antunes, and went to play 227 times for Benfica in the following eight years, winning one league title in 1949–50 and four Taças de Portugal. Fernandes only goal came on 7 March 1954, in a 5–0 win over Oriental.

== Honours ==
Benfica

- Primeira Divisão: 1949–50
- Taça de Portugal: 1948–49, 1950–51, 1951–52, 1952–53
- Latin Cup: 1949–50
