= Eduardo José Corona =

Portuguese footballer

Corona
Personal information
- Full name: Eduardo José Corona
- Date of birth: 1 September 1925
- Place of birth: Barreiro, Portugal
- Date of death: 22 March 2008 (aged 82)
- Position: Forward

Youth career
- 1941–1943: Sporting Lavradiense
- 1943–1945: Luso

Senior career*
Years	Team	Apps	(Gls)
1945–1953	Benfica	102	(37)
1953–1955	Braga	51	(22)
1955–1957	Vitória de Setúbal	12	(3)
1957–1958	Barreirense	16	(3)
1958–1959	Coruchense		
1959–1960	União de Tomar		
1960–1961	Amora		
Total		181	(55)
- * Club domestic league appearances and goals

Eduardo José Corona (1 September 1925 – 22 March 2008) was a Portuguese footballer who played as forward.

He represented various clubs in the Primeira Divisão but was best known for his time at Benfica, where he won five major titles, including the Latin Cup.

== Career ==
Born in Barreiro, Portugal, Corona played for Sporting Lavradiense and Luso Futebol Clube in his youth years. He joined Benfica in 1945 but had to wait over a year to make his debut, which arrived on 24 November 1946, in the league opener with Porto.

Competing with players like Guilherme Espírito Santo, Rogério Pipi and Julinho, he nonetheless received significant playing time, averaging about 20 games per year. Corona's best season at Benfica was 1948–49, when he scored 23 goals, 15 in the league. During his time at Benfica, he won the league title once, the Taça de Portugal four times, and he added an international trophy, the Latin Cup in 1950.

In 1953, he moved to Braga, representing them for two years, before moving to Vitória de Setúbal. His last year in the top tier was 1957–58, when he played for his home-town club, Barreirense.

== Honours ==
Benfica

- Primeira Divisão: 1949–50
- Taça de Portugal: 1948–49, 1950–51, 1951–52, 1952–53
- Latin Cup: 1950
