= José da Costa =

José da Costa may refer to:

- José da Costa (volleyball) (born 1941), Brazilian volleyball player
- José da Costa (footballer) (born 1928), Portuguese footballer
