= Kálmán Székány =

Hungarian football manager (1885–1967)

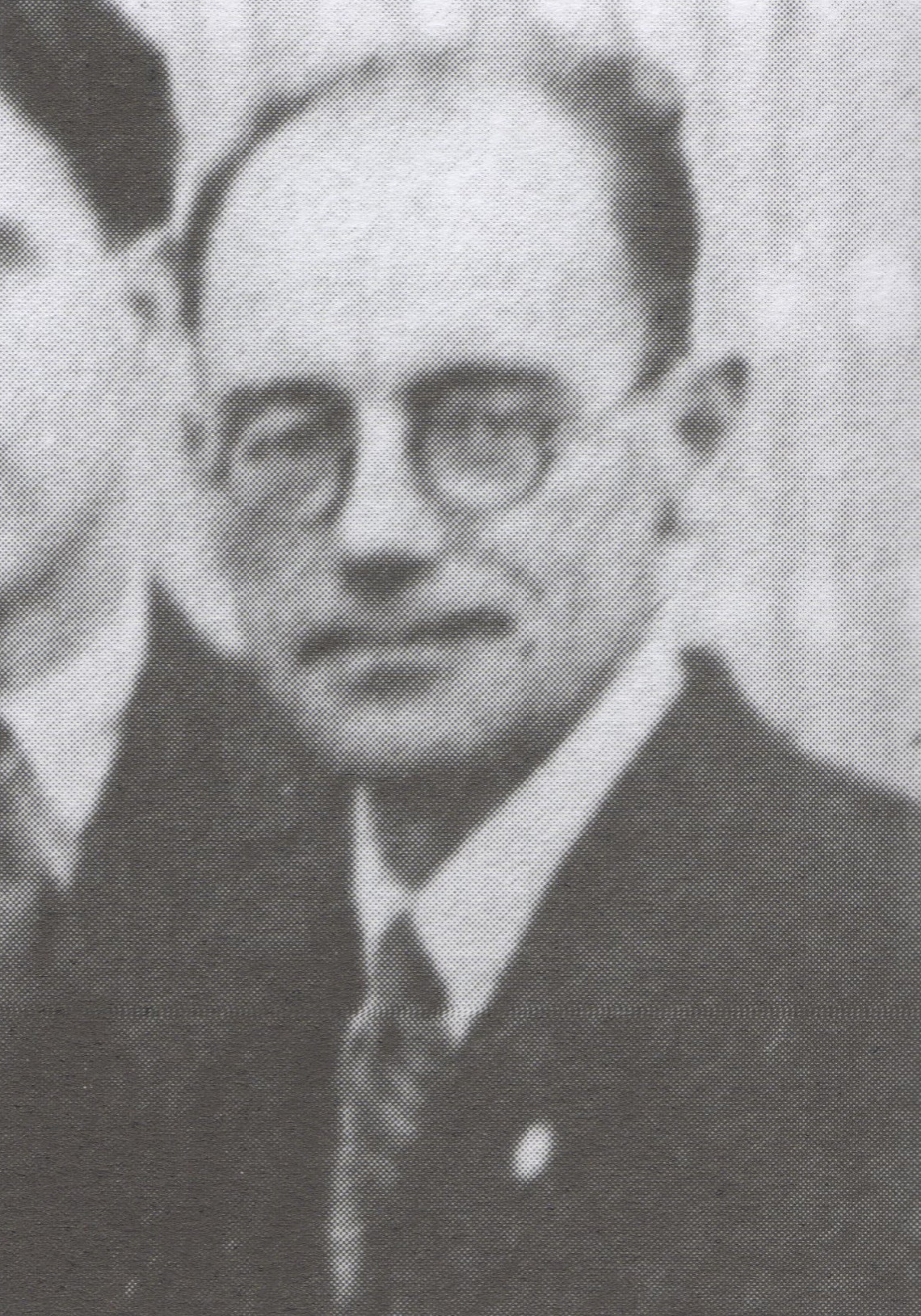
- Szekany in 1932

Personal information
- Date of birth: 1 February 1885
- Place of birth: Budapest, Hungary
- Date of death: 31 July 1967 (aged 82)
- Place of death: Paris, France

Managerial career
- Years: Team
- 1932–1933: Rennes
- 1933–1935: Bordeaux
- 1935–1937: AS Brest

Kálmán Székány (1 February 1885 – 31 July 1967) was a Hungarian football manager. Born in Hungary, he was known mostly for his managerial career in France. In 1932, Székány became the first professional manager of Rennes. He later served as manager of Bordeaux and AS Brest helping the latter club reach the quarter-finals of the Coupe de France in 1936.
