= Claude Bez =

French soccer team chairman

- Born: November 4, 1940; Bordeaux, France
- Died: January 26, 1999 (aged 58); Bordeaux, France
- Occupation: President of FC Girondins de Bordeaux (1978–1990)

Claude Bez (November 4, 1940 – January 26, 1999), former Bordeaux soccer team chairman, was a personality in French football culture of the 1980s.

== Biography ==
Claude Bez was born in Saint-Augustin, Bordeaux. His mother died when he was young. His father, Gaston, ran a small accounting firm that was growing quickly with branches in French overseas departments.

In his youth he played football for Coqs Rouges. (Note: Coqs Rouges: football section of Coqs Rouges, a French multi-sports club located in Gradignan.) On April 4, 1959, he won the U20 Gironde Cup against Girondins de Bordeaux. He played full-back, was thin and sported a mustache. He left Coqs Rouges for Villenave-d'Ornon, a neighborhood team, and soon devoted himself to a career in accounting.

He chaired Bordeaux for 12 years, leading the club to three French championship titles (1984, 1985 and 1987), two French Cups against Marseille in 1986 (2–1 after extra time) and in 1987 (2–0), and an uninterrupted run of participation in the European Cup from 1982 to 1989. He failed to achieve his dream of seeing Bordeaux become the first French club to win a European Cup; the team narrowly failed in the semi-finals in 1985 and 1987.

In 1988, he became superintendent of the French national team, a position created especially for him, and hired Michel Platini as coach to rebuild French football.

The end of his presidency was marked by his rivalry with Bernard Tapie. He is also known as the father of the French soccer broadcasting rights.

In September 1990, the fiscal administration launch a judiciary procedure against Bez for the surfacturation of Le Haillan, the formation center of the Girondins. In mars 1994, the Bordeaux tribunal condemn him to two years in prison and a fine of 2 million francs for fraud, forgery by instruction and concealment of use of forgery.

The 30 October of 1990, he launch another massive scandal in an interview to L’Équipe in which he confessed offering prostitutes to referees in European competitions.

He died of a heart attack in 1999.

== See also ==
- Football Club des Girondins de Bordeaux
