= Jean-Guy Astresses =

French footballer (1929–2020)

Personal information
- Date of birth: 24 June 1929
- Place of birth: Bordeaux, France
- Date of death: 30 March 2020 (aged 90)
- Place of death: Bordeaux, France
- Position: Goalkeeper

Youth career
- Coqs Rouges de Bordeaux
- Bordeaux

Senior career*
Years	Team	Apps	(Gls)
1951–1955	Bordeaux	18	(0)
- * Club domestic league appearances and goals

Jean-Guy Astresses (24 June 1929 – 30 March 2020) was a French footballer who played as a goalkeeper for Bordeaux.

== Biography ==
Astresses played out his junior career with Coqs Rouges de Bordeaux before joining FC Girondins de Bordeaux. From 1951 to 1955, he played as a backup to Pierre Bernard, appearing in 18 different matches. Bordeaux was a finalist for the Coupe de France in 1955. He was a stand-by player at the 1952 Summer Olympics.
