= Henri Baillot =

French footballer (1924–2000)

Personal information
- Date of birth: 13 December 1924
- Date of death: 9 November 2000 (aged 75)
- Height: 1.70 m (5 ft 7 in)
- Position: Forward

Senior career*
Years	Team	Apps	(Gls)
1945–1950	Metz	158	(80)
1950–1952	Girondins de Bordeaux	66	(34)
1952–1953	Strasbourg	24	(11)
1953–1955	Stade Rennais	44	(20)
Total		292	(145)

International career
1948–1950	France	8	(4)
- * Club domestic league appearances and goals

Henri Baillot (French: [ɑ̃ʁi bajo]; 13 December 1924 – 9 November 2000) was a French footballer. He played in eight matches for the France national football team from 1948 to 1950. He was also named in France's squad for the Group 3 qualification tournament for the 1950 FIFA World Cup.
