= Pacheco Nobre =

Portuguese footballer (1925–2018)

Personal information
- Full name: Mário Fernando Ribeiro Pacheco Nobre
- Date of birth: 22 September 1925
- Place of birth: Portugal
- Date of death: 17 October 2018 (aged 93)
- Position: Forward

Senior career*
Years	Team	Apps	(Gls)
- Académica

International career
1950	Portugal	1	(0)
- * Club domestic league appearances and goals

Mário Fernando Ribeiro Pacheco Nobre (22 September 1925 – 17 October 2018) was a Portuguese footballer who played as a forward.
