= Manuel Capela =

Portuguese footballer (1922–1999)

Personal information
- Full name: Manuel Maria Nogueira Capela
- Date of birth: 9 May 1922
- Place of birth: Angeja, Portugal
- Date of death: 7 January 1999 (aged 76)
- Place of death: Coimbra, Portugal
- Position: Goalkeeper

Senior career*
Years	Team	Apps	(Gls)
1946–1949	Belenenses		
1949–1952	Académica		

International career
1947–1951	Portugal	5	(0)
- * Club domestic league appearances and goals

Manuel Maria Nogueira Capela (9 May 1922 – 7 January 1999) was a Portuguese footballer who played as a goalkeeper.

== Football career ==
Capela gained 5 caps for Portugal and made his debut 5 January 1947 in Lisbon against Switzerland, in a 2–2 draw.

== Death ==
Capela died in Coimbra on 7 January 1999, at the age of 76.
