= Manuel Passos =

Portuguese footballer

Passos
Personal information
- Full name: Manuel Passos Fernandes
- Date of birth: 26 March 1922
- Place of birth: Machico, Portugal
- Date of death: Deceased
- Position: Defender

Senior career*
Years	Team	Apps	(Gls)
1947–1957	Sporting		

International career
1952–1957	Portugal	17	(0)
- * Club domestic league appearances and goals

Manuel Passos Fernandes (26 March 1922 in Machico – January 10, 1980), was Portuguese footballer who played as defender.

== International career ==
Passos gained 17 caps for the Portugal national team and made his debut 23 November 1952 in Porto, in a 1–1 draw against Austria.
