= Ted Smith (footballer, born 1914) =

English footballer and manager (1914–1989)

Personal information
- Full name: John Edward Smith
- Date of birth: 3 September 1914
- Place of birth: Grays, England
- Date of death: 1989 (aged 74–75)
- Place of death: Lisbon, Portugal
- Height: 6 ft 0 in (1.83 m)
- Position: Full-back

Senior career*
Years	Team	Apps	(Gls)
1935–1948	Millwall	143	(1)

Managerial career
- 1948–1952: Benfica
- 1952–1953: Workington
- 1971–1973: Atlético Clube de Portugal
- * Club domestic league appearances and goals

John Edward Smith (1914 – 1989), was an English football player and coach.

A full-back, Smith represented Millwall in the late 1930s. He then coached Benfica from 1948 to 1952 guiding them to their first international trophy.

== Career ==
Born 3 September 1914 in Grays, in the Essex county, Smith football career started at Millwall F.C. in 1935, as the Lions were on Third Division. He was part of the squad that eliminated (2–0) Manchester City on the quarter-finals of the 1936–37 FA Cup, on 6 March 1937, which would be known as one of the historic giant-killings in the FA Cup. In the next season, Smith helped the club get promoted to the second tier, playing just one season before the War interruption. He competed a further three years, retiring in 1948, age 33, after amassing over 140 league caps.

He immediately started a managerial career, arriving at Benfica in 1948. The club last league title was in 1944–45, and Sporting CP was in the most successful period of their history, winning seven of the eight championships contested from the 1946–47 season to the 1953–54 season, losing only in the 1949–50 season to Smith's Benfica. This was the age of the Cinco Violinos ("Five Violins").

Adding up to the league title, Smith's biggest success was conquering the Latin Cup, the predecessor of UEFA Champions League, contested by Latin European nations of France, Italy, Spain and Portugal, after defeating Bordeaux at Estádio Nacional on 18 June 1950.

After bagging his second Taça de Portugal in his third year in charge, his fourth year was more irregular. In December, Smith, resigned for personal problems, changed his mind in March and returned, but only for a month, leaving again in April. His successor, Cândido Tavares won the Taça de Portugal preventing a trophyless season.

After Benfica, Smith managed Workington for one season, and had a short spell at Atlético Clube de Portugal in the early 1970s.

== Managerial statistics ==
Team	From	To	Record				
Team	From	To	G	W	D	L	Win %
Benfica	1 July 1948	6 April 1952	109	73	18	18	66.97

== Honours ==
Benfica

- Latin Cup: 1950
- Primeira Liga: 1949–50
- Taça de Portugal: 1948–49; 1950–51
