= José da Costa (footballer) =

Portuguese footballer

Personal information
- Full name: José Estevão da Costa
- Date of birth: 18 August 1928
- Place of birth: Lisbon, Portugal
- Position: Half-back

Senior career*
Years	Team	Apps	(Gls)
1946–1947	CUF Barreiro		
1947–1952	Benfica	23	(1)
1952–1955	Vitória de Guimarães	72	(6)
1955–1957	Lusitano de Évora	31	(3)
Total		126	(10)
- * Club domestic league appearances and goals

José Estevão da Costa (born 18 August 1928), known just as José da Costa, is a former Portuguese footballer who played as a half-back. Starting at CUF Barreiro, Costa was fringe player at Benfica, where he won two titles. Elsewhere, he helped Vitória de Guimarães and Lusitano de Évora establish themselves in the Primeira Liga.

== Career ==
Born in Lisbon, Costa started his career at CUF Barreiro, before joining Benfica in 1947. He made his debut on 9 May 1948, against Elvas, and scored his first goal two weeks later on 30 May, with Olhanense. His playing time was limited in 1948–49, as he only played once, on 10 October in a 6–0 win against Vitória de Setúbal. In the following year, he played sparingly but still helped Benfica win the league and the Latin Cup, playing all the games of the latter. Despite playing more games in 1950–51 and in 1951–52, he did not win any silverware, since he did play in any of Taça de Portugal campaign's that Benfica won.

In 1952, he departed Benfica to play for Vitória de Guimarães, helping them to two consecutive eight place finishes in the league, but also being involved in the club first demotion in 1954–55. He kept on playing in the first tier, moving to Lusitano de Évora in 1955, being regularly used in two seasons there, which included a club best, fifth place in 1956–57.

== Honours ==
Benfica

- Primeira Divisão: 1949–50
- Latin Cup: 1949–50
