= Joaquim Pacheco =

Portuguese footballer (born 1926)

Personal information
- Full name: Joaquim Pedro Pacheco
- Date of birth: 30 March 1926
- Place of birth: Macau, Macau
- Position: Defender

Senior career*
Years	Team	Apps	(Gls)
1946–1950	PSP Macau		
1950–1959	Sporting CP		

International career
1957	Portugal	1	(0)
- * Club domestic league appearances and goals

Joaquim Pedro Pacheco (born 30 March 1926) is a Portuguese former footballer who played as a defender and who played most notably for Sporting football club.
