= Francesco Antonazzi =

Italian footballer

Personal information
- Date of birth: 24 May 1924
- Place of birth: Morlupo, Italy
- Date of death: 25 February 1995 (aged 70)
- Position: Defender

Francesco Antonazzi (6 May 1924 – 25 February 1995) was an Italian footballer. He played in more than 250 matches for S.S. Lazio between 1946 and 1956. He was also part of Italy's squad for the football tournament at the 1948 Summer Olympics, but he did not play in any matches.
