= Christian Montes =

French football player and manager (born 1942)

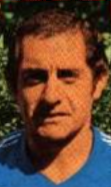
- Montes with Bordeaux in the 1975–76 season

Personal information
- Date of birth: 12 January 1942 (age 84)
- Place of birth: Rauzan, France
- Height: 1.75 m (5 ft 9 in)
- Position: Goalkeeper

Senior career*
Years	Team	Apps	(Gls)
1960–1971	Bordeaux	149+ (Note: Statistics for the 1961–62 and 1963–64 seasons are missing.)	(0+)
1965–1966	→ Cherbourg (loan)	35	(0)
1971–1973	Strasbourg	56	(0)
1973–1975	Monaco	70	(0)
1975–1976	Bordeaux	4	(0)
Total		314+	(0+)

Managerial career
- 1976–1978: Bordeaux
- * Club domestic league appearances and goals

Christian Montes (born 12 January 1942) is a French former professional football player and manager. In his playing days as a goalkeeper, he played for Bordeaux, Cherbourg, Strasbourg, and Monaco. Following his retirement in 1976, he became the head coach of his former club Bordeaux for two seasons.

== Honours ==
Bordeaux

- Coupe de France runner-up: 1967–68, 1968–69
- Coupe Charles Drago runner-up: 1965

Strasbourg

- Division 2: 1971–72

Monaco

- Coupe de France runner-up: 1973–74
