= André Gérard =

French footballer and manager (1911-1994)

Personal information
- Date of birth: 3 July 1911
- Place of birth: France
- Date of death: May 26, 1994 (aged 82)
- Position: Goalkeeper

Senior career*
Years	Team	Apps	(Gls)
1937–1945	Bordeaux		

Managerial career
- 1947–1957: Bordeaux
- 1957–1959: Nancy
- 1959–1961: Toulon
- 1963–1965: Tunisia
- 1965–1967: Stade Français
- 1968–1970: Rouen
- 1970–1972: Bordeaux
- * Club domestic league appearances and goals

André Gérard (3 July 1911 – 26 May 1994) was a French football player and manager. He played as a goalkeeper for Bordeaux.

In France, he coached Bordeaux, FC Nancy, Toulon, Stade Français and Rouen. He also had a stint for the Tunisia national team.

== Honours ==
=== As manager ===
Bordeaux

- Ligue 1: 1949-50

Tunisia

- Arab Cup: 1963
