= André Doye =

French footballer (1924–1981)

Personal information
- Date of birth: 15 September 1924
- Place of birth: Raimbeaucourt, France
- Date of death: 29 November 1981 (aged 57)
- Place of death: Bordeaux, France
- Height: 1.74 m (5 ft 9 in)
- Position: Forward

Senior career*
Years	Team	Apps	(Gls)
1944–1946	Lens		
1946–1948	Toulouse	48	(5)
1948–1956	Bordeaux	130	(27)
1956–1960	Dieppe		

International career
1950–1952	France	7	(5)
- * Club domestic league appearances and goals

André Doye (15 September 1924 – 29 November 1981) was a French professional footballer who played as a forward. He scored five goals in seven appearances for the France national team from 1950 to 1952. At club level, he most notably played for Bordeaux from 1948 to 1956, winning the Division 1 title in the 1949–50 season.

== Honours ==
Bordeaux

- Division 1: 1949–50; runner-up: 1951–52
- Coupe de France runner-up: 1951–52, 1954–55
- Latin Cup runner-up: 1950
