= René Persillon =

French footballer (1919–1997)

Personal information
- Date of birth: 16 June 1919
- Place of birth: Pessac, France
- Date of death: 27 July 1997 (aged 78)
- Height: 1.86 m (6 ft 1 in)
- Position: Midfielder

Senior career*
Years	Team	Apps	(Gls)
1942–1954	Bordeaux	255	(58)

International career
1948–1952	France	3	(1)
- * Club domestic league appearances and goals

René Persillon (16 June 1919 – 27 July 1997) was a French footballer who played as a midfielder. He competed at the 1948 Summer Olympics and the 1952 Summer Olympics.

== Club career ==
Persillon only played for one club in his senior career, Bordeaux, from 1942 to 1954. He was French champion in the 1949–50 season, which was Bordeaux's first league title.

== International career ==
Persillon was selected in the France Olympic team's squad for the 1948 Summer Olympics, and played two matches against India and Great Britain, as France were eliminated in the Quarterfinals. He scored the second goal in the game against India.

He was also part of France's squad for the 1952 Summer Olympics and played France only game in the competition, a 2–1 defeat against Poland national football team.

He was only player to be part of France squads for both the 1948 and the 1952 Olympic Games.

He never had a cap with France senior team.

== Honours ==
Bordeaux

- French Division 1: 1949–50
