= Félix Antunes =

Portuguese footballer

Félix
Personal information
- Full name: Félix Assunção Antunes
- Date of birth: 14 December 1922
- Place of birth: Barreiro, Portugal
- Date of death: 6 July 1998 (aged 75)
- Place of death: Pretoria, South Africa
- Position: Defender

Youth career
- CUF

Senior career*
Years	Team	Apps	(Gls)
?–1944	Unidos Futebol Clube	?	(?)
1946–1954	Benfica	188	(2)

International career
1949	Portugal	15	(0)
- * Club domestic league appearances and goals

Félix Assunção Antunes (14 December 1922 – 6 July 1998), known as Félix, was a Portuguese footballer who used to play as midfielder or as defender. He is notable for his run with S.L. Benfica.

== Career ==
While he played football he was at the same time a CUF Indústrial Worker.

Félix used to have a great positional presence and he was the engine of the team, it was common among the supporters the expression "SL & FÉLIX". He played ten seasons with the Benfica jersey from 1944 to 1954. He was considered as one of the best defenders in the world back in the days.

He started his career as a centre-back by the hand of János Biri (1946). With the arrival of Lippo Hertzka (1947), Félix started being used as midfielder, but when Ted Smith arrived he changed the all tactical perspective of the team, putting Félix at centre-back, the position he became famous at.

He was part of the team that won the Latin Cup against FC Bordeaux (1950).

He ended his career at 30 years old due to an episode that occurred after a Benfica loss against Vitória S.C., when after the game Félix threw his shirt to the floor on the locker room. Due to this disrespectful act against the SL Benfica symbol, the president of Benfica dismissed his services.

== National team ==
Félix represented the Portugal national football team 15 times.

== Honours and awards ==
- Portuguese Liga: (1) 1949/50
- Portuguese Cup: (4)1948/49, 1950/51, 1951/52 and 1952/53
- Latin Cup: (1) 1949/50
