= René Gallice =

French association football player (1919-1999)

Personal information
- Full name: René Alexis Martial Gallice
- Date of birth: 13 April 1919
- Place of birth: Forcalquier, France
- Date of death: 25 May 1999 (aged 80)
- Place of death: Bordeaux, France
- Position: Midfielder

Youth career
- Marseille

Senior career*
Years	Team	Apps	(Gls)
1937–1938	Marseille	7	(0)
1938–1939	Bordeaux		
1945–1956	Bordeaux		
1956–1957	AS Gironde sur Dropt		

International career
1951	France	1	(0)
- * Club domestic league appearances and goals

René Alexis Martial Gallice (13 April 1919 – 25 May 1999) was a French footballer who played as a midfielder.
