= Francisco Moreira =

Portuguese footballer

Personal information
- Date of birth: 29 April 1915
- Place of birth: Portugal
- Date of death: 2 November 1991 (aged 76)
- Position: Midfielder

Senior career*
Years	Team	Apps	(Gls)
–1944	Barreirense		
1944–1949	Benfica		

International career
1945–1948	Portugal	7	(1)
- * Club domestic league appearances and goals

Francisco Moreira (29 April 1915 – 2 November 1991) was a Portuguese footballer who played as a midfielder.

== Career ==
Moreira began playing club football with F.C. Barreirense. Late in his career, he joined S.L. Benfica where he would win the league title.

Moreira gained 7 caps and scored 1 goal for Portugal, and made his debut 6 May 1945 in A Coruña against Spain in a 2–4 defeat.

== Honours ==
Benfica

- Primeira Divisão (2)
- Taça de Portugal (4)
- Latin Cup: 1950
