= 1949–50 French Division 1 =

12th season of French Division 1

Division Nationale
- Season: 1949–50

FC Girondins de Bordeaux won Division 1 season 1949/1950 of the French Association Football League with 51 points.

== Participating teams ==
- Bordeaux
- RC Lens
- Lille OSC
- Olympique de Marseille
- FC Metz
- SO Montpellier
- FC Nancy
- OGC Nice
- RC Paris
- Stade de Reims
- Stade Rennais UC
- CO Roubaix-Tourcoing
- AS Saint-Etienne
- FC Sète
- FC Sochaux-Montbéliard
- Stade Français FC
- RC Strasbourg
- Toulouse FC
Location of teams in 1949–50 Division 1

== Final table ==
Pos	Team	Pld	W	D	L	GF	GA	GAv	Pts	Qualification or relegation
1	Bordeaux (C)	34	21	9	4	88	40	2.200	51	
2	Lille	34	20	5	9	79	44	1.795	45	
3	Reims	34	18	8	8	62	47	1.319	44	
4	Toulouse	34	16	10	8	65	41	1.585	42	
5	Nice	34	16	7	11	67	52	1.288	39	
6	Sochaux	34	16	6	12	65	51	1.275	38	
7	Racing Paris	34	14	8	12	67	56	1.196	36	
8	Marseille	34	13	9	12	56	60	0.933	35	
9	Rennes	34	12	10	12	64	58	1.103	34	
10	Roubaix-Tourcoing	34	9	15	10	49	46	1.065	33	
11	Saint-Étienne	34	12	8	14	60	58	1.034	32	
12	Nancy	34	12	7	15	52	58	0.897	31	
13	Strasbourg	34	11	9	14	46	73	0.630	31	
14	Sète	34	12	5	17	59	72	0.819	29	
15	Lens	34	9	8	17	49	68	0.721	26	
16	Stade Français-Red Star	34	9	8	17	51	71	0.718	26	
17	Montpellier (R)	34	10	3	21	50	87	0.575	23	Relegation to French Division 2
18	Metz (R)	34	5	7	22	53	100	0.530	17	Relegation to French Division 2

Rules for classification: Victory: 2 points, Draw: 1 point, Defeat: 0 points
(C) Champions; (R) Relegated

Promoted from Division 2, who will play in Division 1 season 1950/1951

- Nîmes Olympique: Champion of Division 2
- Le Havre AC: Runner-up

== Results ==
Home \ Away	BOR	RCL	LIL	OM	MET	SOM	FCN	NIC	RCP	REI	REN	CRT	STE	SÉT	SOC	SFF	RCS	TOU
Bordeaux		5–1	1–1	3–1	1–1	7–0	5–0	2–1	4–0	4–0	2–1	4–2	5–2	4–2	2–1	2–1	6–0	1–2
Lens	1–3		1–0	1–2	5–3	3–0	2–1	2–1	0–0	0–0	3–3	3–2	2–4	2–3	1–2	2–1	1–2	0–3
Lille	4–2	4–1		1–2	2–1	5–0	2–1	4–1	2–2	4–0	1–0	0–0	3–1	3–2	2–0	5–1	7–1	4–1
Marseille	3–0	1–4	2–3		4–0	3–2	1–2	1–0	1–1	2–2	3–1	2–0	2–0	3–4	3–0	2–1	2–2	2–2
Metz	2–3	1–1	0–0	1–3		5–2	3–0	0–3	1–4	2–4	1–2	2–2	1–4	1–1	0–2	1–1	6–3	1–4
Montpellier	0–1	4–2	4–3	1–0	5–2		2–1	2–2	3–1	0–1	5–6	0–1	1–1	3–2	1–4	1–2	3–0	1–0
Nancy	0–0	0–0	0–1	4–0	7–2	2–1		2–2	1–1	0–2	3–1	2–2	2–1	4–0	0–0	1–1	1–2	2–1
Nice	3–2	1–1	3–2	6–4	0–2	1–0	4–0		1–4	1–1	2–1	3–2	1–1	5–0	5–0	3–0	5–1	0–5
Racing Paris	3–4	1–2	3–1	5–0	2–2	6–0	4–1	1–2		2–4	1–2	1–1	4–3	2–1	2–1	2–1	3–0	1–1
Reims	0–2	5–0	2–1	2–0	6–2	2–1	1–0	1–1	3–2		3–1	2–1	0–0	2–1	5–3	0–3	6–1	1–0
Rennes	0–0	1–1	0–3	1–1	3–1	5–1	2–1	5–2	1–2	1–1		1–1	3–1	4–2	1–2	5–0	1–1	0–0
Roubaix-Tourcoing	0–0	1–0	1–2	1–1	3–1	4–0	0–1	1–0	1–3	1–1	2–2		2–0	3–1	0–2	2–2	2–0	0–1
Saint-Étienne	1–1	2–0	3–4	2–0	1–3	5–1	3–5	2–0	1–1	1–2	2–2	0–0		1–0	1–0	2–0	5–0	3–0
Sète	2–2	3–1	0–2	1–2	4–1	2–0	4–0	1–0	5–0	3–1	0–1	3–3	2–0		1–2	3–2	2–1	1–1
Sochaux	3–3	1–0	3–1	4–0	3–1	2–2	3–4	0–3	0–2	2–0	2–1	1–1	6–2	8–1		1–2	0–0	1–2
Stade Français	0–4	4–3	1–1	1–1	5–0	1–2	0–4	0–2	2–1	2–0	3–1	2–2	2–2	4–0	2–5		0–0	1–3
Strasbourg	1–1	3–2	2–1	1–1	2–1	2–1	3–0	0–0	2–0	2–1	2–3	2–4	1–3	1–1	0–1	3–1		4–1
Toulouse FC	1–2	1–1	2–0	1–1	8–2	3–1	2–0	2–3	2–0	1–1	3–2	1–1	2–0	3–1	0–0	5–2	1–1	

Legend: Blue = home team win; Yellow = draw; Red = away team win.

== Top goalscorers ==
Rank	Player	Club	Goals
1	(France) Jean Grumellon	Rennes	24
2	(France) Jean Baratte	Lille	22
3	(Netherlands) Lambertus De Harder	Bordeaux	21
4	(France) Christian Bottollier	Nancy	19
5	(France) Désiré Carré	Nice	18
5	(France) Henri Fontaine	Sète	18
7	(France) (Poland) Édouard Kargu	Bordeaux	17
7	(France) André Strappe	Lille	17
7	(France) (Poland) Thadée Cisowski	Metz	17
7	(France) Marcel Lanfranchi	Toulouse FC	17
