= Rogério Pipi =

Portuguese footballer (1922–2019)

Personal information
- Full name: Rogério Lantres de Carvalho
- Date of birth: 7 December 1922
- Place of birth: Lisbon, Portugal
- Date of death: 8 December 2019 (aged 97)
- Positions: Left winger; forward

Senior career*
Years	Team	Apps	(Gls)
- Chelas
1942–1947	Benfica	76	(57)
1947	Botafogo		
1948–1952	Benfica	136	(68)
- Oriental

International career
1945–1953	Portugal	15	(2)
- * Club domestic league appearances and goals

Rogério Lantres de Carvalho (7 December 1922 – 8 December 2019), known as Rogério Pipi, was a Portuguese footballer who played mainly as a forward.

Over the course of 14 seasons, he amassed Primeira Liga totals of 245 games and 132 goals, most notably at Benfica. He gained 15 caps for the Portugal national team, scoring 2 goals.

== Club career ==
Born in Lisbon, Carvalho began his career at local club Chelas. In 1942, he signed with Benfica, where he played 12 seasons, excepting a period in 1947, when he played for Brazilian side Botafogo. He was one of the victims, so to speak, of Otto Glória's professionalism; he left Benfica in 1954 because he did not want to quit his job, and finished his career in another local club, Oriental.

With Benfica, he won three league titles, six Portuguese cups and one Latin Cup. In total, he played 310 matches and scored 210 goals for Benfica. Carvalho holds the record of best scorer in Portuguese cup finals, with 15 goals.

== Honours ==
Benfica

- Primeira Liga: 1942–43, 1944–45, 1949–50
- Taça de Portugal: 1942–43, 1943–44, 1948–49, 1950–51, 1951–52, 1952–53
- Latin Cup: 1950

Individual

- Taça de Portugal top scorer: 1950–51, 1951–52
