= Édouard Kargu =

French footballer (1925–2010)

Personal information
- Full name: Édouard Kargulewicz
- Date of birth: 16 December 1925
- Place of birth: Górki, Poland
- Date of death: 13 March 2010 (aged 84)
- Position: Striker

Senior career*
Years	Team	Apps	(Gls)
- Cognac
1947–1958	Bordeaux	348	(145)

International career
1950–1953	France	11	(3)
- * Club domestic league appearances and goals

Édouard Kargulewicz (16 December 1925 – 13 March 2010), known simply as Édouard Kargu, was a France international footballer who played as a striker. Born in Poland, Kargu played professionally for Bordeaux between 1947 and 1958, and was the Ligue 1 topscorer in the 1953–54 season scoring 27 goals.

== Personal life ==
Kargu was born in Poland, and emigrated to France at a young age. He was an international for the France national football team.
