= FC Girondins de Bordeaux =

French football club

Girondins de Bordeaux
- Full name: Football Club des Girondins de Bordeaux
- Nicknames: Les Girondins (The Girondins); Le Club au Scapulaire (The Scapular Club); Les Marines et Blanc (The Navy and Whites)
- Short name: FCGB
- Founded: 1 October 1881; 145 years ago (as a gymnastics and shooting club); 1920; 106 years ago (as a professional association football club)
- Stadium: Stade Atlantique Bordeaux Métropole
- Capacity: 42,115
- Owner: Park Bench
- President: Dominique Delport
- Head coach: Arnaud Cormier
- League: Régional 1
- 2025–26: National 2 Group A, 2nd of 16 (administratively relegated)
- Website: www.girondins.com
Home colours	Away colours	Third colours

FC Girondins de Bordeaux active departments
Football (men's)	Football (women's)

Football Club des Girondins de Bordeaux (French pronunciation: [ʒiʁɔ̃dɛ̃ də bɔʁdo]), commonly referred to as Girondins de Bordeaux (Occitan: Girondins de Bordèu) or simply Bordeaux, is a French football club based in the city of Bordeaux in Gironde, Nouvelle-Aquitaine. They compete in the Regional 1, the sixth tier of football in France, after an administrative double relegation in 2024 and 2026.

Bordeaux was founded on 1 October 1881 as a multi-sports club and it is one of the most successful football clubs in France. The club has won six Division 1/Ligue 1 titles, the last in 2009. Bordeaux have also won four Coupe de France titles, three Coupe de la Ligue titles, and three Trophée des champions titles. In international competitions Bordeaux has reached the UEFA Cup final in 1996 and the Latin Cup final in 1950. From the year of its inception to 2015 the club's stadium was the Stade Chaban-Delmas, after which Bordeaux's home ground was moved to the Stade Atlantique.

== History ==
=== Beginnings ===
The club took its name Girondins from the demonym for people from the department of Gironde, and was founded on 1 October 1881 as a gymnastics and shooting club. The club, chaired by André Chavois, later added sports such as rowing, equestrian, and swimming, among others. It was not until 1910 when football was officially introduced to the club following strong urging from several members within the club, most notably club president Raymond Brard, though it was only available on a trial basis. The experiment with football lasted only a year before returning almost a decade later in 1919. The club contested its first official match in 1920 defeating Section Burdigalienne 12–0.

Bordeaux achieved professional status in football on 2 July 1936, partly due to the club's merger with fellow Bordelais outfit Girondins Guyenne Sport, which resulted in the club that exists today. Bordeaux's rise to professionalism came about alongside the French Football Federation's plea to increase professionalism in French football, which prior to 1932, had been non-existent. The club was inserted into the second division of French football and made its debut appearance during the 1937–38 season. The club's first manager was Spaniard Benito Díaz. Diaz brought fellow Spanish players Santiago Urtizberea and Jaime Mancisidor to the team with the latter serving as captain. The club's most prominent Frenchmen on the team were homegrown attacker Henri Arnaudeau and goalkeeper André Gérard. Bordeaux played its first official match on 23 May 1937 defeating Rhône-Alpes-based FC Scionzier 2–1 at the Stade de Colombes. The club's first ever league match was contested on 22 August losing away to Toulouse 3–2. Bordeaux recorded its first league win against Nîmes. Unfortunately for the club, the team finished 6th in the Southern region of the division. Bordeaux's disappointing finish inserted the club into the relegation playoff portion of the league where the team finished a respectable 3rd. A year later, Bordeaux moved into a new home, the Stade Chaban-Delmas, which had previously been known as, simply Parc Lescure. The facility was built specifically for the 1938 FIFA World Cup and, following the competition's completion, was designated to Bordeaux. The club had formerly played its home matches at the Stade Galin, which today is used as a training ground.

=== Success and stability ===
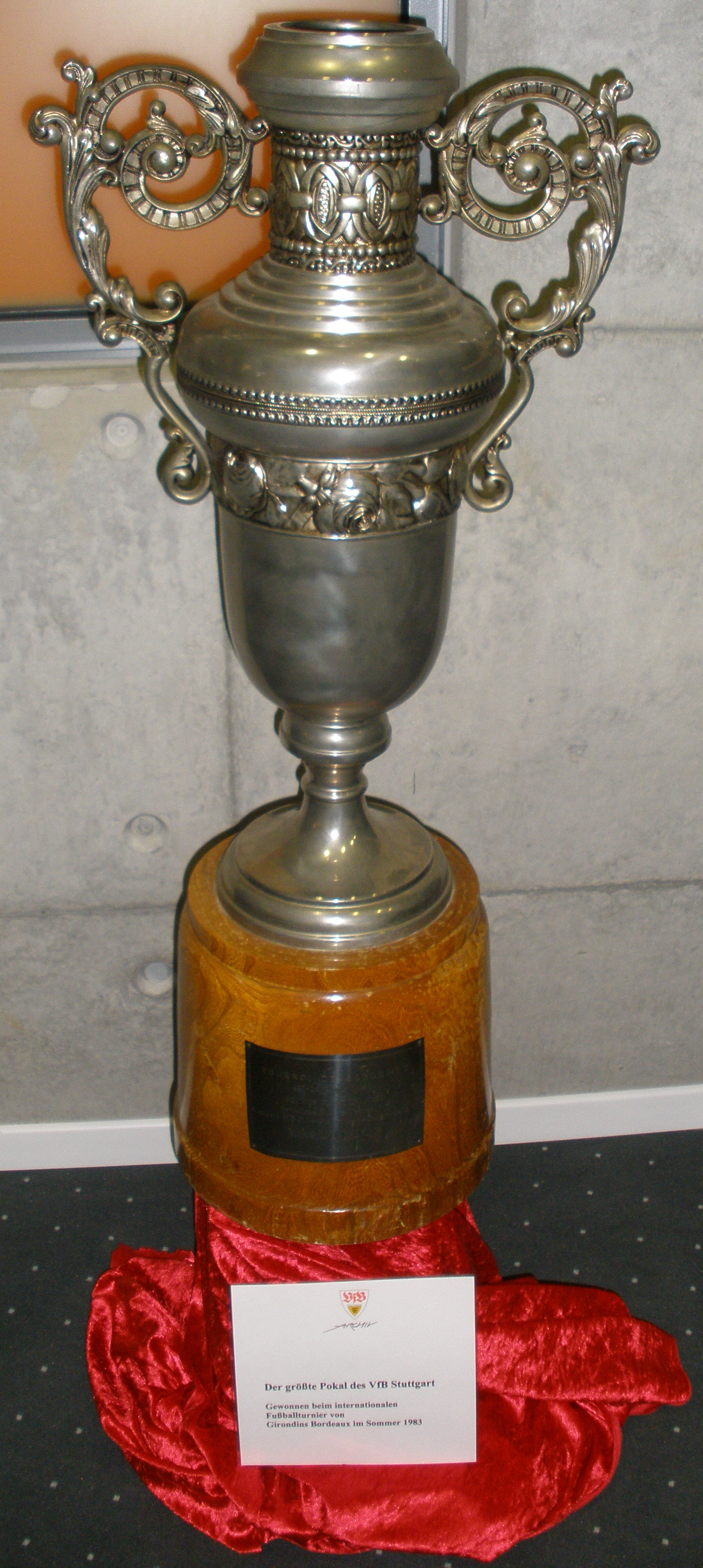
Trophy of the centenary tournament of Girondins de Bordeaux

On 15 October 1940, Bordeaux merged with local club AS Port and took on one of the club's most prestigious traditions, the scapular. Bordeaux ASP, which the club was now known, adorned the scapular during its run to the 1941 edition of the Coupe de France final. The match, played in occupied France at the Stade Municipal in Saint-Ouen, saw Bordeaux defeat SC Fives 2–0 with Urtizberea netting both goals. The Coupe de France triumph was the club's first major honour. Following the liberation of France, Bordeaux returned to league play and earned promotion to the first division following its 2nd-place finish during the 1948–49 season. After the season, André Gérard, now manager of the club, signed Dutchman Bertus de Harder. Led by the three-headed monster of De Harder, Édouard Kargu, and Camille Libar, Bordeaux captured its first-ever league championship, in just the club's first season in the first division, winning by six points over second place Lille. The league success led to Bordeaux being selected to participate in the second edition of the Latin Cup. In the competition, Bordeaux reached the final drawing 3–3 with Portuguese outfit Benfica. The draw forced a second match with Benfica claiming victory following an extra time goal after over two hours and 25 minutes of play.

Bordeaux maintained its title-winning aspirations finishing runners-up to Nice two seasons after winning its first title. The club also performed well in cup competitions reaching the Coupe de France final in 1952 and 1955. In 1952, Bordeaux suffered defeat to the team it finished runner-up to the same year, Nice, following a thrilling match in which eight goals were scored with five of them coming in the first 40 minutes. Bordeaux drew the match at 3–3 following a 55th-minute goal from Henri Baillot, but Nice countered minutes later with two goals in a span of four minutes to go up 5–3, which was the final result. In 1955, Bordeaux were trounced 5–2 by Lille who went up 4–0 within 35 minutes. The resulting struggles in the cup competitions led to struggles domestically with the club suffering relegation in the 1955–56 season. The club returned to the first division for the 1959–60 season, but failed to make an impact falling back to Division 2 after finishing last in the standings with 21 points.

Bordeaux returned to its former self in the 1960s under new manager and former player Salvador Artigas. Under the helm of Artigas, Bordeaux returned to the first division and finished in a respectable fourth place for the 1962–63 season. The following season, Bordeaux returned to the Coupe de France final where the club faced off against Lyon. Bordeaux, once again, were defeated 2–0 courtesy of two goals from the Argentine Nestor Combin. The club's runner-up finish resulted in the team qualifying for the 1964–65 Inter-Cities Fairs Cup. The appearance was brief with the club losing 4–3 on aggregate to German club Borussia Dortmund. Four seasons later, Bordeaux again reached the final of the Coupe de France, the club's seventh appearance overall. The team faced Saint-Étienne and, again failed to match the achievement reached in 1941 losing 2–1. The following season, Bordeaux earned another appearance in the final, but again, failed to win the trophy losing 2–0 to Marseille. The team suffered an extreme decline during the 1970s, despite the arrival of Alain Giresse. The club played under seven different managers during the decade and consistently finished at the bottom half of the table. In 1979, the club was sold to the influential and ambitious real estate mogul Claude Bez, who positioned himself as president of the club. In the summer of 1983, Girondins de Bordeaux organised a centenary tournament; Bordeaux won a 2–0 victory over Barcelona in the semi-finals of this tournament, and in the final, the club was defeated by VfB Stuttgart.

=== Return to prominence in the 1980s ===
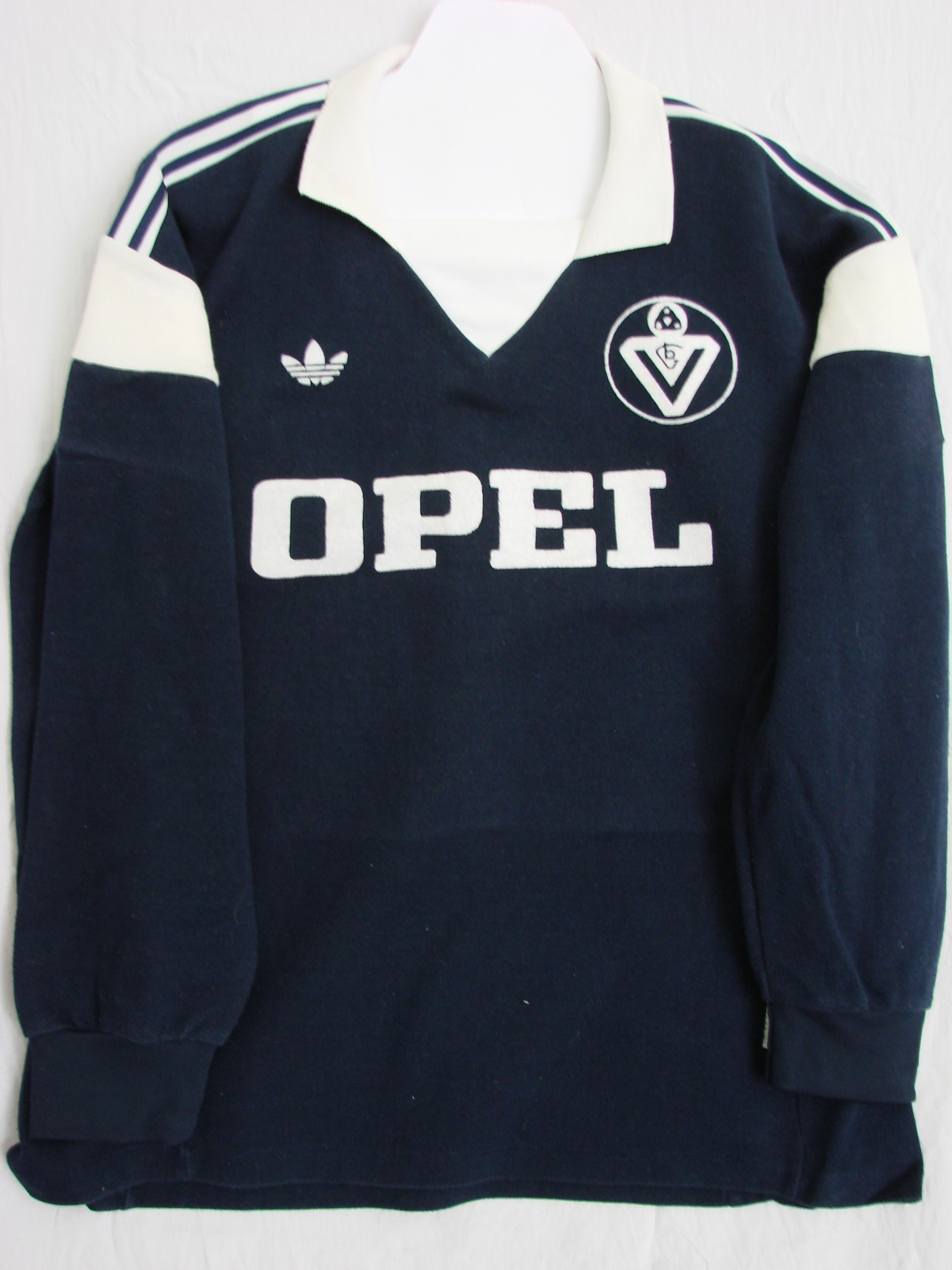
Bordeaux's home kit of their victorious 1984–85 Division 1 season

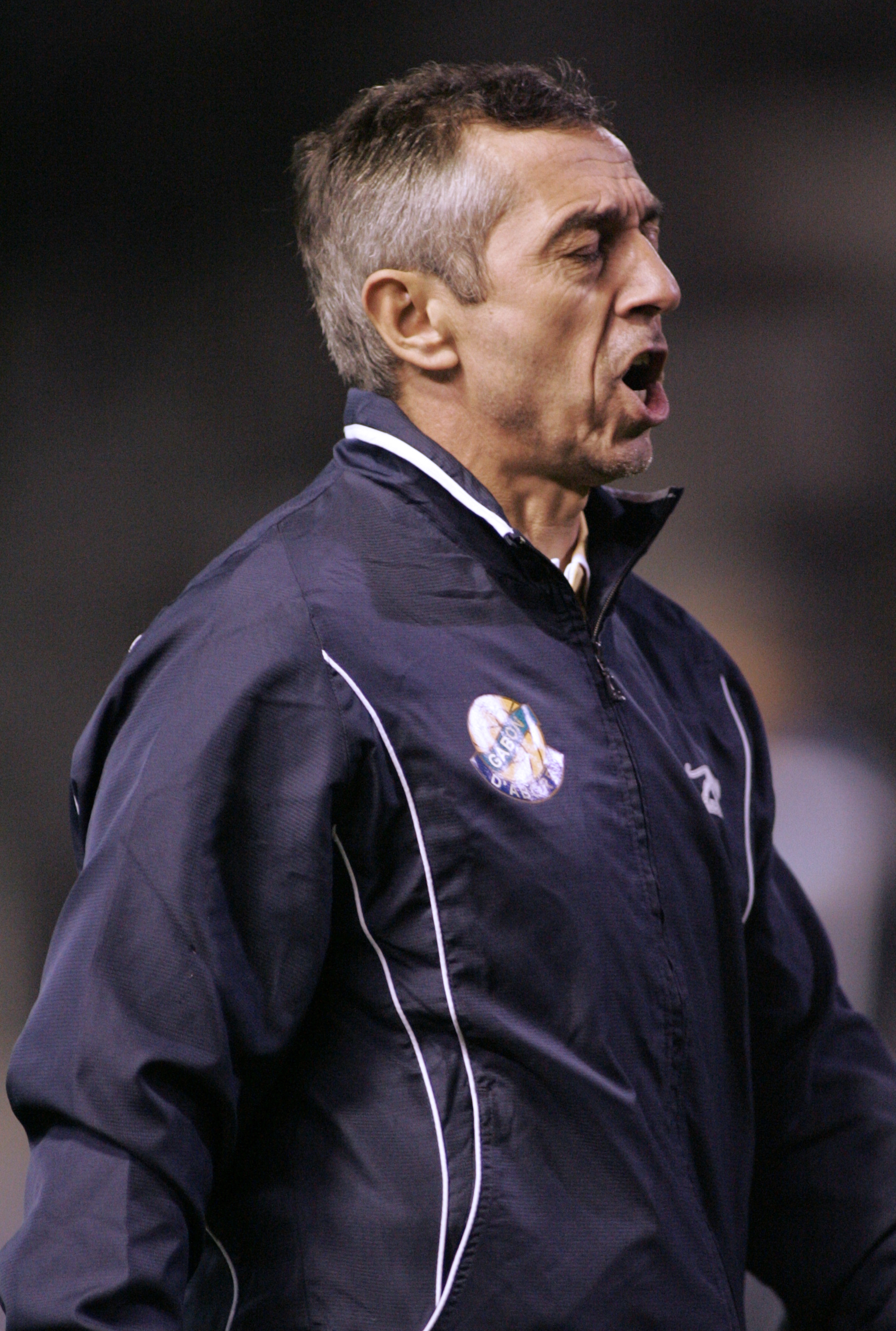
Alain Giresse, influential Bordeaux player in the '70s and '80s and the club's all-time top scorer

Under the helm of Claude Bez, who injected millions into the club, Bordeaux flourished winning three league championships, two Coupe de France titles, and also performed well in European competitions, most notably reaching the European Cup semi-final in 1985. During Bez's run presiding over the team, he recruited several French internationals such as Bernard Lacombe, Jean Tigana, René Girard, Jean-Christophe Thouvenel, and Thierry Tusseau. Bez also brought in established manager Aimé Jacquet. Led by 1970s mainstays Giresse and Gernot Rohr, Bordeaux captured its first league championship since 1950 in the 1983–84 season finishing equal on points with Monaco, however, due to having a better goal difference, Bordeaux were declared champions. The next season, Bordeaux again won the league claiming the title by four points over second place Nantes. In Europe, Bordeaux played in the 1984–85 European Cup and reached the semi-finals, defeating Spanish club Athletic Bilbao, Romanian club Dinamo București, and Soviet outfit Dnipro Dnipropetrovsk before losing to Italian club Juventus. In the Coupe de France, Bordeaux finally achieved cup glory defeating Marseille 2–1 in the 1986 edition of the final with Tigana and Giresse recording both goals. The Coupe de France trophy was the club's first since 1941 after eight agonising attempts in finals. The following year the club responded by winning the trophy again; in a re-match with Marseille, Bordeaux won its second consecutive cup courtesy of goals from Philippe Fargeon and Zlatko Vujović. Bordeaux then capped off the 1986–87 Division 1 season by winning its fourth league title and achieving the double as well.

Bordeaux ended the decade with a 13th-place finish in their 1989 league campaign.

=== Rising from the ashes in the 1990s ===
Due to administrative problems, the club was relegated just two years thereafter. In 1992, however, Les Girondins won that year's Division 2 title, thus being elevated to the top tier of French football. In the emergence of young and exciting players such as playmaker Zinedine Zidane, striker Christophe Dugarry and left back Bixente Lizarazu, the club ascended even higher to win the UEFA Intertoto Cup in 1995. With this talented trio, the club defeated FC Rotor Volgograd (the 1995 King's Cup Winner), Real Betis, Milan and Slavia Prague in the second, third, quarter- and semi-finals respectively to reach the 1996 UEFA Cup final where they were beaten by Bayern Munich 5–1 on aggregate. Bordeaux witnessed further glory only three years later, winning their fifth French league title in the 1998–99 season with winger Sylvain Wiltord winning the Golden Boot of that season with 22 goals.

=== Into the 2000s ===
During the 1999–2000 season, the club played in the new UEFA Champions League for the first time. In two seasons time Bordeaux won another piece of silverware, beating Lorient 3–0 in the 2002 Coupe de la Ligue final. Le club au scapulaire then two seasons later defeated Club Brugge 4–1 on aggregate in the fourth round to reach the 2004 UEFA Cup quarter-finals, where the club fell to eventual winners Valencia. Bordeaux got to another final in 2007 where there were eventually victorious in winning the Coupe de la Ligue of that year. Bordeaux then achieved further honours in winning the Ligue 1 and Coupe de la Ligue titles of the 2008–09 French footballing season thus achieving the first ever double in the club's history. In 2013, Bordeaux won the Coupe de France defeating Evian 3–2 in the final. In the 2013–14 Ligue 1 season, Bordeaux finished 7th in the table. In 2015, Bordeaux appointed Willy Sagnol but in 2016 Sagnol was terminated after only winning one match in the first eight games of the season and was replaced by Ulrich Rame. On 27 May 2016, Rame was replaced by Jocelyn Gourvennec. On 20 January 2018, Gourvennec was fired and was replaced by Gus Poyet. Poyet guided Bordeaux to a 6th-placed finish at the end of the season.

In July 2018, General American Capital Partners's CEO Joseph DaGrosa pursued the purchase of the French professional football team for €70 million after 19 years of M6's ownership.

On 18 August 2018, Poyet was suspended by Bordeaux after labelling the situation as "embarrassing" when Gaëtan Laborde was sold to Montpellier without his knowledge or consent. On 5 September 2018, Ricardo Gomes was appointed as "general manager" — he did not possess the necessary coaching badges to be officially appointed the first-team coach.

The purchase of the club by General American Capital Partners would be completed in November 2018, before they sold their stake to majority shareholder King Street Capital in December 2019.

=== COVID-19 financial crisis ===
On 23 April 2021, the club cited a decreased revenue due to the COVID-19 pandemic. There was also the loss of income of Mediapro, the TV rights holder who went bankrupt after missed payments the year prior. The club was placed in administration when the American owners, King Street stated they would no longer support the club financially. On 22 June 2021, Girondins de Bordeaux announced that Gérard López acquired the club.

For the first time since the 1990–91 season, Bordeaux finished last in the 2021–22 Ligue 1 season and were relegated to the Ligue 2. That was when the club were administratively relegated as a consequence of financial difficulties. On 14 June 2022, the DNCG administratively relegated Bordeaux to the Ligue 3 due to financial issues. The club confirmed it would appeal the decision, citing it as 'brutal'. On 27 July 2022, Bordeaux won its appeal and was officially reinstated in Ligue 2 for the 2022–23 season.

=== Financial administration ===
==== Administrative relegation to Championnat National 2 ====
At the end of the 2023–24 season, Bordeaux was again administratively relegated to the Championnat National. Although the club had initially appealed the decision, it later withdrew the appeal.

On 25 July 2024, it was announced that the club informed the French Football Federation (FFF) that they would officially give up their status as a professional football club, with current player contracts being terminated and the team's training centre closing indefinitely. In a press release, the club stated that they would still be promoting their youth academies, and hoping they could play in the Championnat National next season and get back to Ligue 1 with "sound finances and a renewed ambition". Then, on 1 August 2024, due to bankruptcy, Bordeaux was forcibly relegated to the Championnat National 2 and put into financial administration by the French football controlling body, the National Directorate of Management Control/DNCG (French: Direction Nationale du Contrôle de Gestion).

==== Relegation to regional ====
On 30 June 2026, reports confirmed that Bordeaux had been relegated to the fifth tier of French football following its ongoing financial collapse, after failing to cover a €9 million shortfall. The club remained in financial difficulty amid uncertainty over investment and restructuring, including talks with British firm Sparta Capital Management, led by investor James Bord, over a potential takeover and funding package. On 15 July 2026, the FFF Appeals Commission upheld the DNCG's decision to exclude Bordeaux from the national championships after Sparta Capital Management failed to raise the required €10 million. As a result, the club faced relegation to Régional 1, the sixth tier, and the possibility of compulsory liquidation. However, on 31 July 2026, Sparta Capital Management secured the required funding before the deadline to complete its takeover of the club. Bordeaux subsequently sought reinstatement to the fourth-tier Championnat National 2 through an appeal to the CNOSF, while owner Gérard Lopez sold the club to Sparta Capital Management for a symbolic 1€. On 14 August 2026, the CNOSF recommended maintaining Bordeaux's exclusion from national competitions and relegation to Régional 1 or lower. The final decision would rest with the FFF Executive Committee. Bordeaux cited €10.6 million in escrow, an additional US$10 million from new investors, and commitments to repay €20 million in debts, warning that exclusion could lead to liquidation. A week later, on 21 August, the Paris Administrative Court (Tribunal administratif de Paris) upheld the DNCG's decision to exclude Bordeaux from national competitions, which means that Bordeaux competes in Régional 1, the sixth tier of French football, for the 2026–27 season. On 3 September, the FFF upheld Bordeaux's relegation to Régional 1, rejecting the club's request for reinstatement in National 2 following its exclusion from national competitions over financial concerns.

On September 5, 2026, a few days after the FFF confirmed Bordeaux's exclusion from national competitions, the new owners Park Bench and Sparta Capital abandoned the agreement with Gérard Lopez.

== Rivalries ==
Bordeaux has two main rivalries, firstly the Derby de la Garonne with Toulouse FC, so named because Bordeaux and Toulouse are the two major clubs that play in cities in south-western France, both of which are on the river Garonne. The consistency and competitiveness of the rivalry developed following Toulouse's return to Ligue 1 after being administratively relegated to the Championnat National in 2001. Les Girondins also contest the Derby de l'Atlantique with their other main rival FC Nantes, with the name stemming from the two cities' proximity to the Atlantic Ocean. The history of this rivalry transcends over 50 years and 90 derby games have been played between the two clubs altogether. Bordeaux also held a 44-year-old record against another big rival, Marseille. From October 1977 to January 2022, Marseille did not win away at Bordeaux's home ground.

== Players ==
=== Current squad ===
As of 20 November 2026

Note: Flags indicate national team as defined under FIFA eligibility rules; some limited exceptions apply. Players may hold more than one non-FIFA nationality.

No.	Pos.	Nation	Player
—	GK	FRA	Damien Lecroart
—	GK	FRA	Tom Negrel
—	DF	FRA	Hugo Capblanne
—	DF	CIV	Nadjib Cissé
—	DF	FRA	Namakoro Diallo
—	DF	FRA	Ruben Droehnlé
—	DF	FRA	Léo Jousselin
—	DF	FRA	Gabriel Mbala
—	DF	FRA	Momar Seck
—	DF	MLI	Almamy Touré
—	DF	FRA	Benoît Trémoulinas
—	DF	FRA	Driss Trichard (captain)

No.	Pos.	Nation	Player
—	MF	FRA	Soufiane Bahassa
—	MF	FRA	Baptiste Isola
—	MF	FRA	Alexandre Kalyvas
—	MF	FRA	El Hadji M'Boup
—	MF	FRA	Ibrahima Ndione
—	FW	FRA	Mohamed Abderrebi
—	FW	BFA	Joffrey Bazié
—	FW	FRA	Allan Diragbou
—	FW	BEL	Baptiste Guillaume
—	FW	FRA	Steve Shamal
—	FW	FRA	Ahmadou Souane

=== Reserve squad ===
As of 3 January 2025

Note: Flags indicate national team as defined under FIFA eligibility rules; some limited exceptions apply. Players may hold more than one non-FIFA nationality.

No.	Pos.	Nation	Player
—	GK	FRA	Over Mandanda
—	GK	FRA	Tom Ducou
—	DF	FRA	Sékou Fofana
—	DF	FRA	Omar Sané
—	DF	FRA	Jonathan Abonckelet
—	DF	COM	Glenn Younousse
—	DF	FRA	Maël Morigny
—	DF	FRA	Adam Daoudi
—	MF	FRA	Younès Kaabouni
—	MF	FRA	Nathan Benmoussa

No.	Pos.	Nation	Player
—	MF	FRA	Junah Zucolotto
—	MF	FRA	Nolan Bonte
—	MF	FRA	Whissy Ndong
—	MF	FRA	Ranhi Moreau Nguyen
—	FW	FRA	Malhory Noc
—	FW	FRA	Hamidou Yameogo
—	FW	FRA	Noah Ramon
—	FW	FRA	Sofiane Achour
—	FW	FRA	Dian Jacky

== Club records ==
=== Most appearances ===
#	Name	Matches
1°	(France) Alain Giresse	592
2°	(France) Ulrich Ramé	525
3°	(France) Jean-Christophe Thouvenel	490
4°	(France) Guy Calléja	441
5°	(Germany) Gernot Rohr	430
6°	(France) René Gallice	390
7°	(France) Marc Planus	381
8°	(France) Edouard Kargulewicz	341
9°	(France) Jean Tigana	326
10°	(France) Christophe Dugarry	324

=== Top scorers ===
#	Name	Goals
1°	(France) Alain Giresse	182
2°	(France) Edouard Kargulewicz	151
3°	(France) Bernard Lacombe	138
4°	(France) Laurent Robuschi	130
5°	(Portugal) Pauleta	91
6°	(Netherlands) Bertus de Harder	90
7°	(France) Didier Couécou	89
8°	(Morocco) Marouane Chamakh	76
9°	(Argentina) Hector De Bourgoing	72
10°	(France) Lilian Laslandes	70

== Management and staff ==
Club management

- President: Dominique Delport
- Deputy general director: Pit Schanen
- Director of football: Admar Lopes
- Sporting director: John Williams
- Director in charge of legal affairs: Pierre Hammerel
- Administrative and financial director: François Netgen
- Sales director: Gérard Wiseler
- Stadium manager: Luc Mayrisch
- HR director and technical resources: Clément Turpel
- Safety and security director: Aurélien Bausch

Men's football / professional squad

Position	Name
Head coach	(France) Bruno Irles
Assistant coach	(Croatia) Dado Pršo
Goalkeeper coach	Vacant
Fitness coach	(France) Quentin Barat
Doctor	Vacant
Physiotherapist	(France) David Das Neves (France) Jacques Thébault

=== Coaching history ===
In its history, Bordeaux has had 46 coaches. The first was the Spaniard Benito Díaz. Díaz was the first Bordeaux coach to achieve an honour when, in 1941, the club won the Coupe de France. The first Bordeaux coach to win the league was André Gérard. Gérard led the team to the league crown in 1950. He also has the honour of being the club's longest-serving coach having spent a decade with the club from 1947 to 1957. Gérard is followed by Aimé Jacquet who spent nine seasons with the club in the 1980s. Under Jacquet, Bordeaux won three league titles and two Coupe de France titles.

Dates	Coach
1933–1935	(Hungary) Kálmán Székány
1937–1942	(Spain) Benito Díaz
1942–1943	(Spain) Santiago Urtizberea
1943	(England) Eugen Stern
1943–1945	(Spain) Oscar Saggiero
1945–1947	(England) Maurice Bunyan
1947–1957	(France) André Gérard
1957	(Spain) Santiago Urtizberea
1957–1960	(Luxembourg) Camille Libar
1960–1967	(Spain) Salvador Artigas
1967–1970	(France) Jean-Pierre Bakrim
1970	(France) Pierre Danzelle
1970–1972	(France) André Gérard
1972–1974	(France) Pierre Phelipon
1974–1976	(France) André Menaut
1976–1978	(France) Christian Montes
1978–1979	(Argentina) Luis Carniglia
1979–1980	(Belgium) Raymond Goethals
1980–1989	(France) Aimé Jacquet
1989	(France) Didier Couécou
1989–1990	(Belgium) Raymond Goethals
September 1990–1990	(Germany) Gernot Rohr
1990–1991	(France) Gérard Gili
1991 – June 1992	(Germany) Gernot Rohr

Dates	Coach
July 1992 – June 1994	(France) Rolland Courbis
July 1994 – June 1995	(Portugal) Toni
April 1995 – June 1995	(France) Éric Guérit
July 1995 – February 1996	(Federal Republic of Yugoslavia) Slavoljub Muslin
February 1996 – June 1996	(Germany) Gernot Rohr
July 1996 – June 1997	(France) Rolland Courbis
June 1997 – December 1997	(France) Guy Stéphan
December 1997 – October 2003	(France) Elie Baup
October 2003 – May 2005	(France) Michel Pavon
May 2005 – June 2005	(France) Éric Bedouet (interim)
July 2005 – June 2007	(Brazil) Ricardo Gomes
July 2007 – May 2010	(France) Laurent Blanc
May 2010 – May 2011	(France) Jean Tigana
May 2011 – June 2011	(France) Éric Bedouet (interim)
June 2011 – May 2014	(France) Francis Gillot
May 2014 – March 2016	(France) Willy Sagnol
March 2016 – May 2016	(France) Ulrich Ramé

Dates	Coach
July 2016 – January 2018	(France) Jocelyn Gourvennec
January 2018	(France) Éric Bedouet (interim)
January 2018 – August 2018	(Uruguay) Gustavo Poyet
August 2018 – September 2018	(France) Éric Bedouet (interim)
September 2018 – February 2019	(Brazil) Ricardo Gomes and (France) Éric Bedouet
February 2019 – March 2019	(France) Éric Bedouet (interim)
March 2019– August 2020	(Portugal) Paulo Sousa
August 2020 – July 2021	(France) Jean-Louis Gasset
July 2021 – January 2022	(Bosnia and Herzegovina) Vladimir Petković
February 2022	(Czech Republic) Jaroslav Plašil (interim)
February 2022 – October 2023	(France) David Guion
October 2023 – July 2024	(Spain) Albert Riera
August 2024 – March 2026	(France) Bruno Irles

== Honours ==
=== Domestic competitions ===
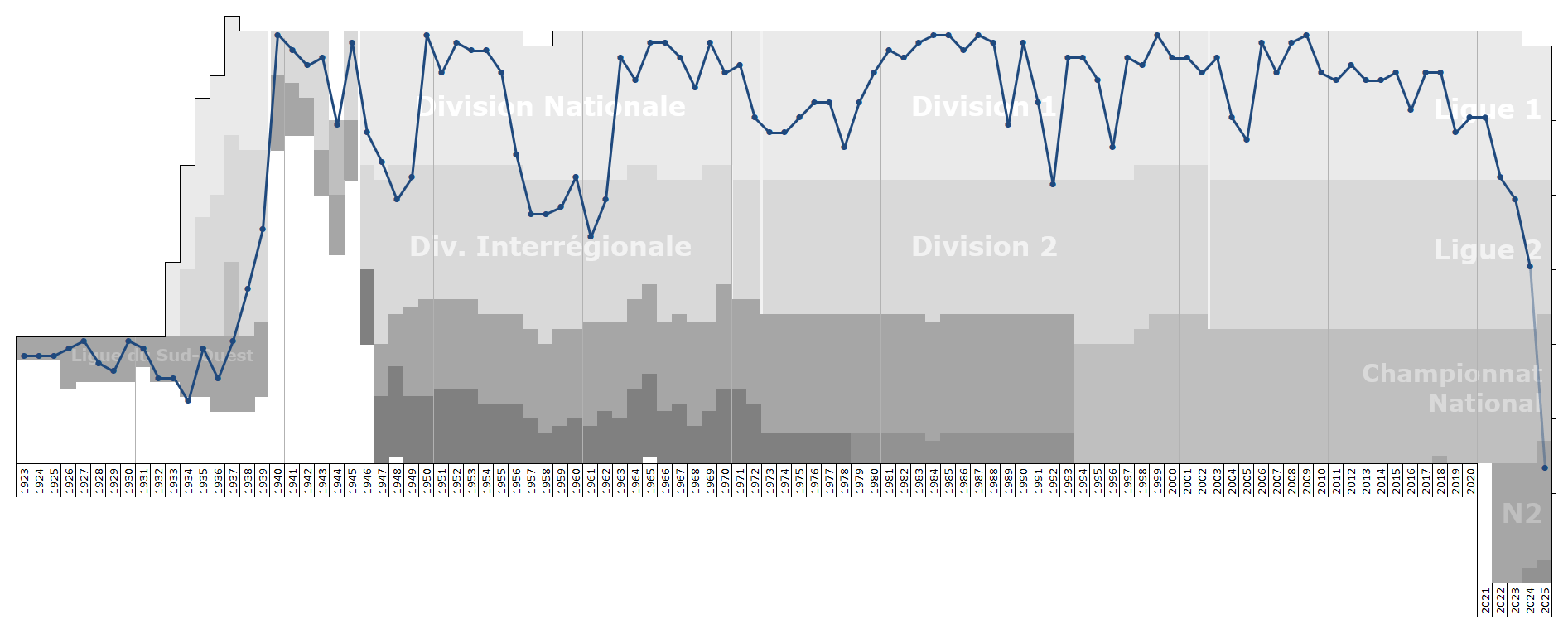
Historical league performance chart of Girondins Bordeaux

- Ligue 1
  - Winners (6): 1949–50, 1983–84, 1984–85, 1986–87, 1998–99, 2008–09
- Ligue 2
  - Winners (1): 1991–92
- Coupe de France
  - Winners (4): 1940–41, 1985–86, 1986–87, 2012–13
- Coupe de la Ligue
  - Winners (3): 2001–02, 2006–07, 2008–09
- Trophée des Champions
  - Winners (3): 1986, 2008, 2009

=== Reserves ===
- Championnat de France Amateur
  - Winner (3): 1937, 1944, 1953

=== Youth ===
- Coupe Gambardella
  - Winner (2): 1976, 2013

=== International competitions ===
- UEFA Intertoto Cup
  - Winners (1): 1995

== FC Girondins de Bordeaux in European football ==
FC Girondins de Bordeaux first competitive European match was in the 1968–69 European Cup Winners' Cup, beating 1. FC Köln 2–1 before ultimately losing 2–4 on aggregate. Since then, the club has participated in 30 UEFA competitions, its peak being the co-champions of the 1995 UEFA Intertoto Cup and the final game of the 1995–96 UEFA Cup.

=== UEFA club coefficient ranking ===
As of March 2022

Rank	Team	Points
120	(France) AS Saint-Étienne	11.483
121	(France) Racing Club de Strasbourg Alsace	11.483
122	(France) FC Girondins de Bordeaux	11.483
123	(Austria) Wolfsberger AC	11.000
124	(Bulgaria) PFC CSKA Sofia	10.500

== Media ==
From 14 August 2008 to 30 October 2018, the M6 Group carried a network about the club's activity known as "Girondins TV". It carried pre-recorded matches during the season, reserve team games, training session rundowns, and a daily talk show.
