= 1949–50 Primeira Divisão =

16th season of top-tier Portuguese football

Primeira Liga
- Season: 1949–50
- Champions: Benfica; 7th title
- Relegated: Lusitano F.C. Elvas C.A.D.
- Matches: 182
- Goals: 773 (4.25 per match)

The 1949–50 Primeira Divisão was the 16th season of top-tier football in Portugal.

== Overview ==
Location of teams in the 1949–50 Liga

It was contested by 14 teams, and S.L. Benfica won the championship.

== League standings ==
Pos	Team	Pld	W	D	L	GF	GA	GD	Pts	Qualification or relegation
1	Benfica (C)	26	21	3	2	86	33	+53	45	
2	Sporting CP	26	19	1	6	91	35	+56	39	
3	Atlético CP	26	11	8	7	53	42	+11	30	
4	Belenenses	26	10	7	9	36	41	−5	27	
5	Porto	26	12	2	12	61	52	+9	26	
6	Sporting da Covilhã	26	10	5	11	55	70	−15	25	
7	Académica	26	8	8	10	56	57	−1	24	
8	Braga	26	11	2	13	52	53	−1	24	
9	Olhanense	26	8	8	10	48	57	−9	24	
10	Vitória de Setúbal	26	10	3	13	50	70	−20	23	
11	Vitória de Guimarães	26	7	7	12	45	59	−14	21	
12	Estoril	26	7	7	12	50	59	−9	21	
13	O Elvas (R)	26	8	3	15	48	65	−17	19	Relegation to Segunda Divisão
14	Lusitano VRSA (R)	26	7	2	17	42	80	−38	16	Relegation to Segunda Divisão

(C) Champions; (R) Relegated

== Results ==
Home \ Away	ACA	ACP	BEL	BEN	BRA	EST	LUS	ELV	OLH	POR	SCP	SCO	VGU	VSE
Académica		1–2	3–0	3–4	3–1	1–1	2–0	3–1	7–1	3–2	1–6	4–6	0–0	6–0
Atlético CP	1–1		1–1	1–1	4–2	2–2	6–1	2–2	3–0	4–1	3–1	4–3	6–0	4–2
Belenenses	2–0	0–0		1–6	2–1	2–0	3–1	2–1	0–0	5–3	1–5	1–1	1–0	2–1
Benfica	1–1	4–0	1–1		4–2	4–0	4–1	3–1	5–1	3–2	2–3	7–1	4–0	6–1
Braga	3–1	3–0	1–0	2–3		2–3	2–0	5–1	2–1	6–0	1–1	3–1	1–1	3–2
Estoril	1–1	2–1	1–2	1–2	1–2		10–0	4–3	0–1	1–0	0–4	6–1	1–1	2–5
Lusitano VRSA	2–4	1–2	5–4	2–3	0–1	4–1		2–1	1–1	3–1	2–0	3–1	3–0	2–2
O Elvas	3–3	1–0	1–0	1–0	4–1	1–2	6–1		4–3	0–3	3–6	2–2	3–2	4–2
Olhanense	3–3	1–1	1–1	1–2	3–1	2–2	4–2	6–3		6–1	2–4	3–1	1–1	2–0
Porto	3–1	3–1	2–0	0–1	4–0	3–0	8–2	1–0	1–1		2–1	5–1	3–0	8–0
Sporting CP	6–0	4–0	0–1	1–2	5–2	5–1	3–1	2–1	6–0	4–1		8–1	5–1	5–1
Sporting da Covilhã	2–2	2–1	2–1	3–4	3–2	2–2	3–0	3–0	2–1	4–2	2–3		5–2	1–0
Vitória de Guimarães	3–0	2–3	3–3	3–5	3–1	3–1	4–1	3–1	3–1	2–2	1–2	2–2		4–2
Vitória de Setúbal	3–2	1–1	1–0	0–5	3–2	5–5	4–2	4–0	1–2	3–0	3–1	2–0	2–1	

Legend: Blue = home team win; Yellow = draw; Red = away team win.
