= Latin Cup =

Defunct European football tournament

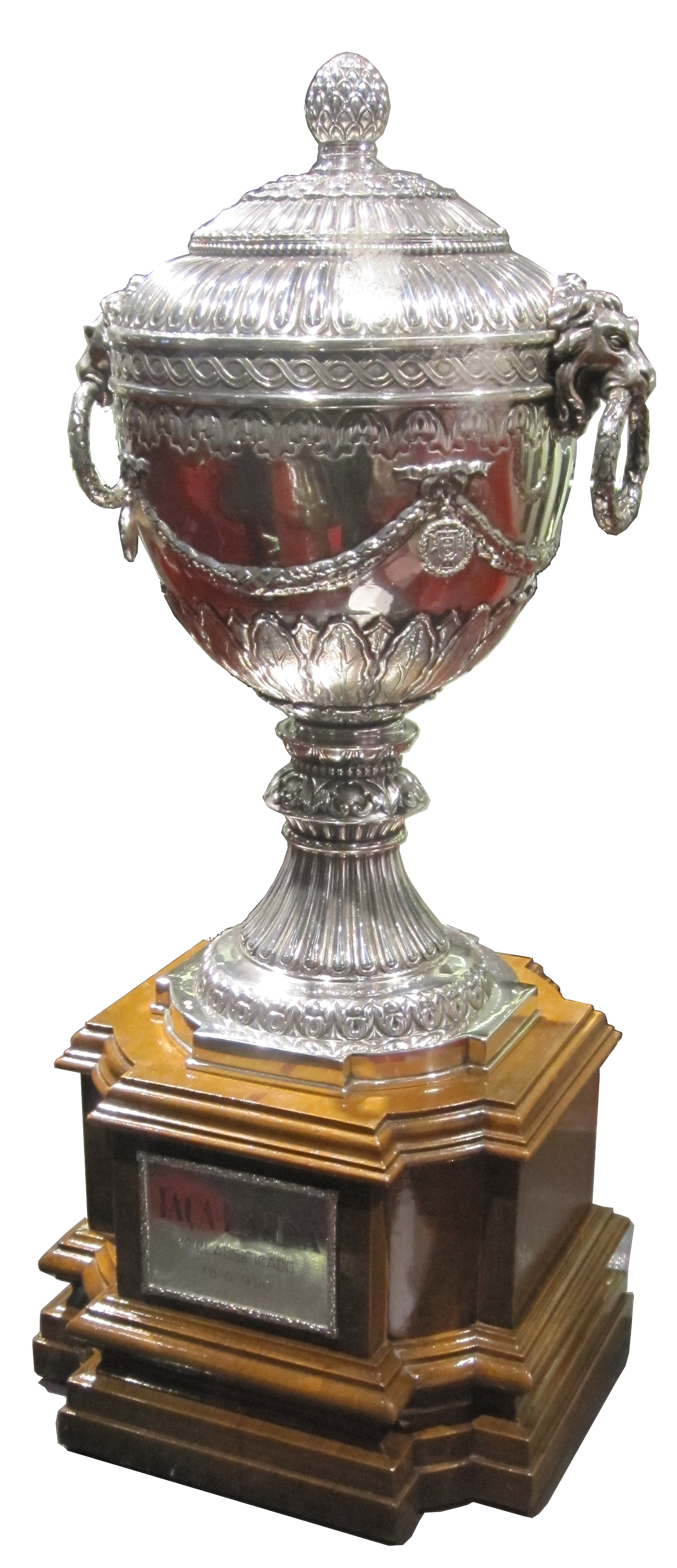
- The trophy awarded to champions
- Organiser(s): (France) FFF (Italy) FIGC (Portugal) FPF (Spain) RFEF
- Founded: 1949
- Abolished: 1957; 69 years ago
- Region: Southwest Europe
- Teams: 4
- Related competitions: Mitropa Cup; Balkans Cup
- Last champions: (Spain) Real Madrid (2nd title) (1957)
- Most championships: (Spain) Barcelona (Italy) Milan (Spain) Real Madrid (2 titles each)

The Latin Cup was an international football tournament for club sides from the Southwest European nations of France, Italy, Spain, and Portugal. In 1949, the football federations came together and requested approval from FIFA to launch the competition. Although FIFA granted approval for the competition to be played under international football guidelines at the time, the Latin Cup was not created nor organized by FIFA. European clubs could not afford hefty travel costs, so competition was staged at the end of every season in a single host country. The competition featured two semi-finals, a third-place play-off, and a final.

This competition is considered a predecessor of European club tournaments, namely the European Cup, the first edition of which was held in 1955.

Although the Latin Cup is acknowledged by UEFA, the competition is treated as a historical precursor to the European Cup and not a UEFA sanctioned competition. Given that UEFA did not create the Latin Cup, UEFA does not include the Latin Cup as an official trophy count.

== History ==
The tournament began in 1949 and was usually played between the league champions of each participating country. Every four years, the countries' ranking would be determined based on their sides' performances in the Latin Cup. The competition was last played in 1957, two years after the introduction of the UEFA-sanctioned European Cup. Real Madrid played and won the European Cup and Latin Cup in 1957.

Prior to the introduction of the European Cup, the Latin Cup was considered the most important cup for clubs in Europe, the longer-established Mitropa Cup having gone into decline after World War II. The Latin Cup has been described one of the forerunners "of the European Cup" by UEFA.

According to Jules Rimet, 3rd President of FIFA, the Latin Cup was a competition created by FIFA at the request of the four nations that contested it, but its regulation was made by a committee composed of members from the competing federations, and FIFA did not participate actively in its organisation.

The Latin Cup was based on cycles of 4 years, being held in one country each year. The champion of each edition achieved the most points (4) to its Federation while teams placed 2nd, 3rd, and 4th received 3, 2, and 1 points, respectively. Moreover, the Federation, which totalised the most points every four years, received the trophy, while the champion club was given a smaller replica of it.

The first edition was opened on 20 June 1949, with the Sporting CP vs Torino at Chamartín Stadium of Madrid. One month before 18 of Torino players had died at Superga air disaster. Barcelona would be the first champion of the tournament after beating Sporting 2–1 at the final.

The second edition clashed with the 1950 FIFA World Cup of Brazil, so most of the players of the league champions were called up by their respective national teams. Therefore, that year, Lazio, the fourth of Serie A, participated in the Latin Cup. In 1951, French runners-up Lille OSC replaced French champions Nice, who relinquished the 1951 Latin Cup in order to play the Copa Rio. Due to a fixture clash with the 1954 FIFA World Cup in Switzerland, no Latin Cup was held that year (the participants would have been Real Madrid, Sporting CP, Lille OSC, and Internazionale—the latter did not get another chance to enter).

After the first four editions played, the Royal Spanish Football Federation won the first cycle with twelve points, eight of which were contributed by Barcelona and four by Atlético Madrid.

== Results ==
All teams were champions of the preceding domestic season in each nation, except where it indicates, detailing their finishing position in respective leagues.

| Year | Final | | | Third Place Match | | | Venue | City |
| Year | Winner | Score | Runner-up | Third place | Score | Fourth place | Venue | City |
|---|---|---|---|---|---|---|---|---|
| 1949 | (Spain) Barcelona | 2–1 | (Portugal) Sporting CP | (Italy) Torino | 5–3 | (France) Reims | Estadio Chamartín | Madrid |
| 1950 | (Portugal) Benfica | 3–3 (a.e.t.) | (France) Bordeaux | (Spain) Atlético Madrid | 2–1 | (Italy) Lazio (4) | Estádio Nacional | Oeiras |
| 1950 | (Portugal) Benfica | 2–1 (a.e.t.) | (France) Bordeaux | (Spain) Atlético Madrid | 2–1 | (Italy) Lazio (4) | Estádio Nacional | Oeiras |
| 1951 | (Italy) Milan | 5–0 | (France) Lille (2) | (Spain) Atlético Madrid | 3–1 | (Portugal) Sporting CP | San Siro | Milan |
| 1952 | (Spain) Barcelona | 1–0 | (France) Nice | (Italy) Juventus | 3–2 | (Portugal) Sporting CP | Parc des Princes | Paris |
| 1953 | (France) Reims | 3–0 | (Italy) Milan (3) | (Portugal) Sporting CP | 4–1 | (Spain) Valencia (2) | Estádio Nacional | Oeiras |
| 1954 | Not held | | | | | | | |
| 1955 | (Spain) Real Madrid | 2–0 | (France) Reims | (Italy) Milan | 3–1 | (Portugal) Belenenses (2) | Parc des Princes | Paris |
| 1956 | (Italy) Milan (2) | 3–1 | (Spain) Athletic Bilbao | (Portugal) Benfica (2) | 2–1 | (France) Nice | Arena Civica | Milan |
| 1957 | (Spain) Real Madrid | 1–0 | (Portugal) Benfica | (Italy) Milan | 4–3 | (France) Saint-Étienne | Santiago Bernabéu | Madrid |

=== Titles by club ===
| Club | Titles | Winning years |
|---|---|---|
| (Spain) Barcelona | 2 | 1949, 1952 |
| (Italy) Milan | 2 | 1951, 1956 |
| (Spain) Real Madrid | 2 | 1955, 1957 |
| (Portugal) Benfica | 1 | 1950 |
| (France) Reims | 1 | 1953 |

=== Titles by country ===
| Country | Titles | Winning years |
|---|---|---|
| Spain | 4 | 1949, 1952, 1955, 1957 |
| Italy | 2 | 1951, 1956 |
| France | 1 | 1953 |
| Portugal | 1 | 1950 |

== Individual records ==
- Most goals: 7 – (Sweden) Gunnar Nordahl
- Most assists: 6 – (Sweden) Gunnar Gren
- Most clean sheets: 3 – (Spain) Juan Alonso

=== Top scorers by year ===
| Year | Player | Goals |
|---|---|---|
| 1949 | (Portugal) Fernando Peyroteo | 3 |
| 1950 | (Portugal) Arsénio Duarte (France) Édouard Kargu (France) André Doye | 3 |
| 1951 | (France) André Strappe | 5 |
| 1952 | (Italy) Giampiero Boniperti | 3 |
| 1953 | (Portugal) João Martins | 4 |
| 1954 | Not held | — |
| 1955 | (Spain) Héctor Rial (France) Léon Glowacki (Italy) Eduardo Ricagni | 2 |
| 1956 | (Uruguay) (Italy) Juan Alberto Schiaffino | 3 |
| 1957 | (Spain) Paco Gento | 3 |

== See also ==
- Mitropa Cup
- Balkans Cup
