= 1955–56 S.L. Benfica season =

Benfica
1955–56 season
- President: Joaquim Ferreira Bogalho
- Head coach: Otto Glória
- Stadium: Estádio da Luz
- Primeira Divisão: 2nd
- Taça de Portugal: Round of 16
- Latin Cup: 3rd
- Top goalscorer: League: José Águas (28); All: José Águas (31)
- Biggest win: Benfica 7–1 Braga (16 January 1956)
- Biggest defeat: Porto 3–0 Benfica (6 November 1955)
Home colours	Away colours

The 1955–56 season was Sport Lisboa e Benfica's 52nd season in existence and the club's 22nd consecutive season in the top flight of Portuguese football, covering the period from 1 August 1955 to 30 July 1956. Benfica competed in the Primeira Divisão, in the Taça de Portugal and in the Latin Cup.

The season saw Benfica lose a tightly contested Primeira Divisão title race, on the final matchday, and fail to defend the Taça de Portugal won in the previous year. The season concluded with a participation in the Latin Cup.

== Season summary ==
Benfica entered the season aiming to defend the league title won in the previous year. During the off-season the most notable departures saw Arsénio Duarte leave to CUF, while future stars Mário João and Domiciano Cavém joined the club.

Benfica began the season visiting Braga and winning 3–2. In the following matchday, the team hosted to S.C. Covilhã, drawing 2–2. They responded by winning the next two games, but a draw with Lusitano de Évora left Benfica with a one-point advantage over Porto, who also drew in the same matchday. However, they ended the October with a 3–1 away win over Sporting and a 4–0 win over Académica, finishing October in first place, with one more point than Porto.

November began with two decisive clashes. First, Benfica visited Porto in the first O Clássico of the season, losing 3–0. They then hosted Belenenses, winning 1–0, defeated CUF 5–1, finished the month one point behind leaders Porto. Benfica began December, drawing Torreense and ending the year in second place with a two-point disadvantage.

They began the new year with a win in Setúbal, following it with six more, but as Porto didn't lose any points the team stayed in second place. On 19 February, Benfica hosted Sporting in the Derby de Lisboa, winning 3–0 and matching Porto on points in first place. The team finished the month with a 1–0 away loss to Académica.

Now two points away from first place, on 4 March, Benfica hosted Porto in a decisive league match, drawing 1–1 which allowed Porto to keep a two-point advantage. In the 22nd matchday the team faced Belenenses, drawing 2–2 and increasing the distance to three points. A win over CUF allowed Benfica to cut the lead to two points, and two more wins along with a Porto loss against Sporting in the 25ht matchday meant Benfica and Porto entered the last matchday tied on points. In the last matchday Benfica defeated Atlético, but as Porto had also won their match, the Lisbon side finished second leveled on points but with a worst goal difference and head-to-head.

Having failed to defend the league title, the team turned its attention to the Taça de Portugal. A 4–0 away win against Farense in the first round allowed Benfica to progress to the round of 16. Next, the team visited Belenenses, Cavém gave Benfica the lead in the 16th minute, but two second half goals from André gave the hosts the win.

After the national competitions concluded, Benfica competed in the Latin Cup, as Porto, like Benfica in the previous year, declined to participate in the competition to make a tour in Brazil. In the semi-final draw, it was determined that Benfica would face Milan and Athletic Bilbao would face Nice, with Milan winning 4–2. On July 3, Benfica and Nice faced each other in the third-place match, with the Lisbon side winning after José Águas scored in the second extra time.

== Competitions ==
Win Draw Loss Postponed

=== Overall record ===
Competition	First match	Last match	Record								
Competition	First match	Last match	G	W	D	L	GF	GA	GD	Win %	Source
Primeira Divisão	18 September 1955	29 April 1956	26	19	5	2	81	33	+48	73.08	
Taça de Portugal	2 May 1956	6 May 1956	2	1	0	1	5	2	+3	50.00	
Latin Cup	29 June 1956	3 July 1956	2	1	0	1	4	5	−1	50.00	
Total			30	21	5	4	85	38	+47	70.00	

=== Primeira Divisão ===
==== League table ====
Pos	Team	Pld	W	D	L	GF	GA	GD	Pts	Qualification or relegation
1	Porto (C)	26	18	7	1	77	20	+57	43	Qualification for the European Cup first round
2	Benfica	26	19	5	2	76	31	+45	43	
3	Belenenses	26	16	5	5	67	25	+42	37	
4	Sporting	26	15	6	5	54	27	+27	36	
5	Sporting da Covilhã	26	11	7	8	52	44	+8	29	

Source: rsssf.com
(C) Champions

==== Results by round ====
Round	1	2	3	4	5	6	7	8	9	10	11	12	13	14	15	16	17	18	19	20	21	22	23	24	25	26
Ground	A	H	H	A	H	A	H	A	H	A	H	A	H	H	A	A	H	A	H	A	H	A	H	A	H	A
Result	W	D	W	W	D	W	W	L	W	W	D	W	W	W	W	W	W	W	W	L	D	D	W	W	W	W
Position	5	5	3	1	1	1	1	2	2	2	2	2	2	2	2	2	2	2	2	2	2	2	2	2	2	2

Source: ForaDeJogo
A = Away; H = Home; W = Win; D = Draw; L = Loss

==== Matches ====
18 September 1955 1	Braga	2–3	Benfica	Braga
	37', 49' Imbelloni		7' Martins; 26' Palmeiro; 77' Águas	Stadium: Estádio 1º de Maio

25 September 1955 2	Benfica	2–2	Covilhã	Lisbon
	Águas 64'; Coluna 81'		86' Hrötkö; 89' Suárez	Stadium: Estádio Nacional; Referee: Amadeu Martins

2 October 1955 3	Benfica	4–1	Barreirense	Lisbon
	Águas 19', 44', 68' (pen.), 90'		70' Grilo	Stadium: Estádio da Luz; Referee: Abel da Costa

9 October 1955 4	Caldas S.C.	0–1	Benfica	Caldas da Rainha
			15' Caiado	Stadium: Campo da Mata; Referee: Amadeu Martins

16 October 1955 5	Benfica	1–1	Lusitano de Évora	Lisbon
	Águas 84'		80' José Pedro	Stadium: Estádio da Luz; Referee: Evaristo Silva

23 October 1955 6	Sporting	1–3	Benfica	Lisbon
	24' Castro		18', 56', 87' Calado	Stadium: Estádio Nacional; Referee: Abel da Costa

30 October 1955 7	Benfica	4–0	Académica	Lisbon
	Águas 65', 87'; Palmeiro 68', 79'			Stadium: Estádio da Luz; Referee: Jaques Matias

6 November 1955 8	Porto	3–0	Benfica	Porto
	Gastão 1'; Jaburú 23'; Teixeira 77'			Stadium: Estádio das Antas; Referee: Amadeu Martins

13 November 1955 9	Benfica	1–0	Belenenses	Lisbon
	Garrido 20'			Stadium: Estádio da Luz; Referee: Paulo de Oliveira

27 November 1955 10	CUF	1–5	Benfica	Barreiro
	80' Arsénio		18', 64' Coluna; 29' Garrido; 52' Palmeiro; 77' Águas	Stadium: Campo de Santa Bárbara; Referee: Braga Barros

4 December 1955 11	Benfica	2–2	Torreense	Lisbon
	Garrido 5'; Águas 67' (pen.)		26' Pina; 37' Costa	Stadium: Estádio da Luz; Referee: Álvaro Rodrigues

1 January 1956 12	Vitória de Setúbal	3–5	Benfica	Setúbal
	Miguel 17', 44' (pen.); Soares 80'		10', 25', 26' Coluna; 20', 78' Águas	Stadium: Campo dos Arcos

8 January 1956 13	Benfica	3–0	Atlético	Lisbon
	Águas 48'; Martins 59'; Cavém 72'			Stadium: Estádio da Luz

16 January 1956 14	Benfica	7–1	Braga	Lisbon
	Cavém 5', 9'; Coluna 19'; Águas 34', 44', 75'; Caiado 90'		56' Velez	Stadium: Estádio da Luz

22 January 1956 15	Covilhã	2–4	Benfica	Covilhã
	Sarrazola 4'; Pires 6'		10', 63', 76' Martins; 52' Águas	Stadium: Estádio Municipal José dos Santos Pinto

29 January 1956 16	Barreirense	2–4	Benfica	Barreiro
	Correira 9' (pen.); Pinto 80'		23', 29' Martins; 73', 75' Coluna

6 February 1955 17	Benfica	3–0	Caldas S.C.	Lisbon
	Palmeiro 15'; Coluna 73'; Martins 90'			Stadium: Estádio da Luz

12 February 1956 18	Lusitano de Évora	0–1	Benfica	Évora
			38' Martins

19 January 1956 19	Benfica	3–0	Sporting	Lisbon
	Águas 41'; Martins 63', 89'			Stadium: Estádio da Luz; Referee: Francisco Guerra

26 February 1956 20	Académica	1–0	Benfica	Coimbra
	Faia 84'			Stadium: Estádio Municipal de Coimbra

4 March 1956 21	Benfica	1–1	Porto	Lisbon
	Águas 76'		31' Teixeira	Stadium: Estádio da Luz; Referee: Evaristo Silva

11 March 1956 22	Belenenses	2–2	Benfica	Lisbon
	Di Pace 15'; Matateu 86'		6' Palmeiro; 56' Coluna

18 March 1956 23	Benfica	3–2	CUF	Lisbon
	Águas 18', 58'; Calado 82'		27', 85' Mota	Stadium: Estádio da Luz

15 April 1956 24	Torreense	2–5	Benfica	Torres Vedras
	Belen 22'; Mendonça 69'		19' Cavém; 21', 80', 89' Palmeiro; 52' Águas	Stadium: Estádio Manuel Marques; Referee: Mateus Pinto Soares

22 April 1956 25	Benfica	5–1	Vitória de Setúbal	Lisbon
	José Águas 32', 51', 61', 84'; Caiado 80'		33' (pen.) Vaz	Stadium: Estádio da Luz; Referee: Francisco Guerra

29 April 1956 26	Atlético	1–4	Benfica	Lisbon
	Legas 60'		5' Cavém; 34' Águas; 44' Martins; 75' Palmeiro	Stadium: Estádio da Tapadinha

=== Taça de Portugal ===
==== First round ====
2 May 1956	Farense	0–4	Benfica	Faro
	Águas; Caiado; Palmeiro			Stadium: Campo de São Luis; Referee: Paulo de Oliveira

==== Round of 16 ====
6 May 1956	Belenenses	2–1	Benfica	Lisbon
	André 58', 60'		16' Cavém

=== Latin Cup ===
==== Semi-Final ====
29 June 1956	Milan	4–2	Benfica	Milan
	Mariani 18'; Schiaffino 40', 57'; Bagnoli 72'		52' Coluna; 65' Caiado	Stadium: Arena Civica; Referee: Julián Arqu (Spain)

==== Third Place Match ====
3 July 1956	Benfica	2–1	Nice	Milan
	Cavém 116'; Águas 132'		102' Milazzo	Stadium: Arena Civica; Referee: JManuel Asensi Martín (Spain)

=== Non-official matches ===
19 September 1955	Beira-Mar	0–7	Benfica

19 September 1955	Benfica	3–2	Valencia	Lisbon
	Salvador 8'; Águas 48'; Cavém 84'		21', 28' Maño	Stadium: Estádio da Luz

27 May 1956	SGS Os Leões	1–5	Benfica	Lisbon
	Águas; Salvador; Cavém		21', 28' Maño	Stadium: Estádio da Luz

27 May 1956	Anadia	1–11	Benfica	Anadia

24 June 1956	Benfica	1–2	Flamengo	Lisbon
	Águas 60'		5' Evaristo; 32' Jadir	Stadium: Estádio da Luz

== Player statistics ==
The squad for the season consisted of the players listed in the tables below, as well as staff member Otto Glória (manager).

Note 1: Note: Flags indicate national team as defined under FIFA eligibility rules. Players may hold more than one non-FIFA nationality.

Note 2: Players with squad numbers marked ‡ joined the club during the 1955-56 season via transfer, with more details in the following section.

No.	Pos	Nat	Player	Total		Primeira Divisão		Taça de Portugal		Latin Cup	
No.	Pos	Nat	Player	Apps	Goals	Apps	Goals	Apps	Goals	Apps	Goals
1	GK	(Portugal) POR	Costa Pereira	32	0	26	0	6	0	0	0
1	GK	(Portugal) POR	José Bastos	2	0	0	0	0	0	2	0
	DF	(Mozambique) MOZ	José Naldo	4	0	4	0	0	0	0	0
	DF	(Portugal) POR	Mário João	0	0	0	0	0	0	0	0
	DF	(Portugal) POR	Zézinho	5	0	5	0	0	0	0	0
2	DF	(Portugal) POR	Jacinto Marques	21	0	17	0	2	0	2	0
3	DF	(Portugal) POR	Artur Santos	30	0	26	0	2	0	2	0
4	DF	(Portugal) POR	Ângelo Martins	26	1	22	1	2	0	2	0
	MF	(Portugal) POR	Augusto Monteiro	5	0	5	0	0	0	0	0
	MF	(Cape Verde) CPV	Du Fialho	1	0	0	0	1	0	0	0
	MF	(Portugal) POR	Francisco Calado	15	4	14	4	1	0	0	0
	MF	(Portugal) POR	Leonel Pegado	6	0	6	0	0	0	0	0
5	MF	(Portugal) POR	Fernando Caiado	26	5	22	3	2	1	2	1
6	MF	(Portugal) POR	Alfredo Abrantes	26	0	23	0	1	0	2	0
	MF	(Portugal) POR	António Mendes	1	0	1	0	0	0	0	0
	FW	(Portugal) POR	Francisco Palmeiro	25	11	23	10	2	1	0	0
	FW	(Portugal) POR	Manuel Azevedo	0	0	0	0	0	0	0	0
	FW	(Portugal) POR	João Garrido	10	3	10	3	0	0	0	0
	MF	(Portugal) POR	Santana	0	0	0	0	0	0	0	0
7	MF	(Portugal) POR	Isidro Santos	0	0	0	0	0	0	0	0
8	FW	(Portugal) POR	Salvador Martins	21	11	17	11	2	0	2	0
9	FW	(Portugal) POR	José Águas	30	31	26	28	2	2	2	1
10	FW	(Portugal) POR	Mário Coluna	29	12	26	11	1	0	2	1
11	FW	(Portugal) POR	Domiciano Cavém	17	7	13	5	2	1	2	1

== Transfers ==
=== In ===
Position	Player	From	Fee	Ref
DF	Mário João	CUF	Undisclosed	
FW	Domiciano Cavém	S.C. Covilhã	Undisclosed	

=== Out ===
Position	Player	To	Fee	Ref
MF	João Gonzaga	Estoril Praia	Undisclosed	
MF	Vieirinha	Lusitano de Évora	Undisclosed	
FW	Arsénio Duarte	CUF	Undisclosed	
FW	Esteves	Académico de Viseu	Undisclosed	
FW	Romeu	Caldas S.C.	Undisclosed	
