= 1956–57 S.L. Benfica season =

Benfica
1956–57 season
- President: Joaquim Ferreira Bogalho (until 30 March 1957); Maurício Vieira de Brito
- Head coach: Otto Glória
- Stadium: Estádio da Luz
- Primeira Divisão: 1st
- Taça de Portugal: Winners
- Latin Cup: Runners-up
- Top goalscorer: League: José Águas (30); All: José Águas (33)
- Biggest win: Benfica 10–1 Barreirense (10 March 1957)
- Biggest defeat: Porto 3–0 Benfica (6 January 1957)
Home colours	Away colours

The 1956–57 season was Sport Lisboa e Benfica's 53rd season in existence and the club's 23rd consecutive season in the top flight of Portuguese football, covering the period from 1 September 1956 to 30 August 1957. Benfica competed in the Primeira Divisão, the Taça de Portugal and in the Latin Cup.

In the third under manager Otto Glória. Benfica won the Primeira Divisão for the ninth time, overcoming mid-season setbacks to finish ahead of Porto, with José Águas claiming the league's top-scorer title with 30 goals. The team also won the Taça de Portugal, completing a domestic double with a 3–1 victory over S.C. Covilhã in the final. Benfica finished the season in the Latin Cup, reaching the final in Madrid, where they were defeated 1–0 by Real Madrid.

== Season summary ==
Benfica entered the season seeking to reclaim the league title after failing to retain it in the previous campaign. Manager Otto Glória remained in charge for a third consecutive season. The off-season featured several departures, but only one player joined the squad, Palmeiro Antunes.

Benfica began the season in Évora against Lusitano de Évora, winning 2–1. In the next match, Benfica hosted Sporting in the Derby de Lisboa, drawing 1–1. Next, the team visited S.C. Covilhã, winning 3–1, with José Águas scoring twice.

On 7 October, Benfica hosted Porto in O Clássico, winning 3–2. The team won its next two matches but ended October with a 2–2 draw against Belenenses at the Estádio do Restelo, closing the month in first place with a two-point lead. The team responded with a win over Atlético, but in the following matchday dropped points in an away draw with Oriental. Two subsequent victories over Barreirense and Vitória de Setúbal allowed Benfica to extend its lead at the top to three points.

Benfica opened December with a 3–0 win over Torreense, but this was followed by a run of negative results, drawing with Académica and Lusitano de Évora, and losing 1–0 to Sporting in the Derby de Lisboa at the Estádio José Alvalade. The team ended the year with a 6–0 win over S.C. Covilhã, closing 1956 level on points with Porto.

The new year began with a decisive clash against Porto at the Estádio das Antas, where Benfica lost 3–0 and dropped to third place, level on points with Belenenses. In their next two matches, the team scored ten goals and won both, but in a home match against Belenenses, Benfica drew 2–2 after leading with a two-goal advantage at half-time, remaining one point behind leaders Porto. In February, Benfica won all three of its league fixtures, climbing to first place after a victory over Vitória de Setúbal combined with Porto's defeat to Belenenses.

Benfica began March by hosting Barreirense and winning 10–1, extending its lead to two points with two matches remaining after Porto were held to a draw by Atlético. A surprising draw in the following visit to Torreense reopened the title race, reducing Benfica's advantage to a single point. On 31 March, Benfica beat Académica 2–0, securing the league title. José Águas finished as the league's top scorer with 30 goals.

After securing the league championship, Benfica turned its attention to the Taça de Portugal. The team defeated Caldas S.C. in the round of 16 and then met Torreense in the quarter-finals. After two draws, a replay was held on 9 May, with Benfica winning 4–0, advancing to the semi-finals, where they beat Barreirense 5–0 on aggregate. On 2 July, Benfica faced S.C. Covilhã in the final, winning 3–1 and completing the domestic double.

Having claimed both national trophies, Benfica travelled to Madrid to compete in the Latin Cup, seeking a historic treble. In the semi-finals, the Portuguese champions faced French league winners Saint-Étienne, winning 1–0 with a goal from Fernando Caiado before a crowd of 100,000. In the other semi-final, hosts Real Madrid defeated title holders AC Milan 5–1. On 23 July, Benfica faced Real Madrid at the Estadio Santiago Bernabéu in the final, taking on the Spanish and back-to-back European champions. Benfica lost 1–0 to a goal by Alfredo Di Stéfano in the 50th minute, shortly before Zézinho was sent off for pulling an opponent's shirt.

The season concluded with an extended tour of Brazil and two fixtures in the United States, at a time when international friendlies held considerable prestige. Benfica played nine matches in total, recording three wins, four draws and two defeats against Brazilian opposition. The most notable encounter was a 3–2 loss to Santos, featuring a young Pelé, with all matches drewing significant attention in the Portuguese press.

== Competitions ==
Win Draw Loss Postponed

=== Overall record ===
Competition	First match	Last match	Record								
Competition	First match	Last match	G	W	D	L	GF	GA	GD	Win %	Source
Primeira Divisão	9 September 1956	31 March 1957	26	17	7	2	75	25	+50	65.38	
Taça de Portugal	18 April 1957	2 June 1957	8	5	3	0	18	4	+14	62.50	
Latin Cup	20 June 1957	23 June 1957	2	1	0	1	1	1	+0	50.00	
Total			36	23	10	3	94	30	+64	63.89	

=== Primeira Divisão ===
==== League table ====
Pos	Team	Pld	W	D	L	GF	GA	GD	Pts	Qualification or relegation
1	Benfica (C)	26	17	7	2	75	25	+50	41	Qualification to European Cup preliminary round and Latin Cup
2	Porto	26	18	4	4	86	23	+63	40	
3	Belenenses	26	13	7	6	74	50	+24	33	
4	Sporting CP	26	12	7	7	62	28	+34	31	
5	Lusitano de Évora	26	13	4	9	57	51	+6	30	

Source: rsssf.com
(C) Champions

==== Results by round ====
Round	1	2	3	4	5	6	7	8	9	10	11	12	13	14	15	16	17	18	19	20	21	22	23	24	25	26
Ground	A	H	A	H	A	H	A	H	A	H	A	H	A	H	A	H	A	H	A	H	A	H	A	H	A	H
Result	W	D	W	W	W	W	D	W	D	W	W	W	D	D	L	W	L	W	W	D	W	W	W	W	D	W
Position	7	6	3	1	1	1	1	1	1	1	1	1	1	1	2	2	3	2	2	2	2	2	1	1	1	1

Source: ForaDeJogo
A = Away; H = Home; W = Win; D = Draw; L = Loss

==== Matches ====
9 September 1956 1	Lusitano de Évora	1–2	Benfica	Évora
	Fialho 71' (pen.)		1' Palmeiro; 65' Coluna	Stadium: Campo Estrela; Referee: Braga Barros

16 September 1956 2	Benfica	1–1	Sporting	Lisbon
	Águas 77' (pen.)		Pompeu 57' (pen.)	Stadium: Estádio da Luz; Referee: Abel Macedo Pires

30 September 1956 3	Covilhã	1–3	Benfica	Covilhã
	Suárez 80'		47', 76' Águas; 70' Santos	Stadium: Estádio Municipal José dos Santos Pinto; Referee: Fernando Guerra

7 October 1956 4	Benfica	3–2	Porto	Lisbon
	Isidro 2'; Águas 47' (pen.); Palmeiro 72'		25' (pen.), 88' Hernâni	Stadium: Estádio da Luz; Referee: Braga Barros

14 October 1956 5	CUF	2–3	Benfica	Barreiro
	Sérgio 1'; Pireza 43'		33', 64' Águas; 69' Salvador	Stadium: Estádio Dr. Manuel de Mello; Referee: Paulo de Oliveira

21 October 1956 6	Benfica	1–0	Caldas	Lisbon
	Palmeiro 83'			Stadium: Estádio da Luz; Referee: Libertino Domingues

28 October 1956 7	Belenenses	2–2	Benfica	Belém
	Miranda 15'; Matateu 61'		21' Salvador; 65' Caiado	Stadium: Estádio do Restelo; Referee: Joaquim Campos

4 November 1956 8	Benfica	4–0	Atlético	Lisbon
	Cavém 36', 66'; Águas 65' Isidro 75'			Stadium: Estádio da Luz; Referee: Jaime Pires

11 November 1956 9	Oriental	1–1	Benfica	Lisbon
	António Leitão 30'		75' (pen.) Águas	Stadium: Estádio Engenheiro Carlos Salema; Referee: Eduardo Gouveia

18 November 1956 10	Benfica	4–0	Vitória de Setúbal	Lisbon
	Cavém 1'; Salvador 14', 89'; Caiado 76'			Stadium: Estádio da Luz; Referee: Abel da Costa

25 November 1956 11	Barreirense	2–4	Benfica	Barreiro
	Faia 22', 69' (pen.)		27', 52' (pen.), 71' Águas; Coluna 64'	Stadium: Estádio Dr. Manuel de Mello; Referee: Inocêncio Calabote

2 December 1956 12	Benfica	3–0	Torreense	Lisbon
	Cavém 43'; Águas 53', 65'			Stadium: Estádio da Luz; Referee: António Calheiros

9 December 1956 13	Académica	0–0	Benfica	Coimbra
				Stadium: Estádio Municipal de Coimbra; Referee: Inocêncio Calabote

16 December 1956 14	Benfica	2–2	Lusitano de Évora	Lisbon
	Pegado 30'; Caiado 36'		8', 80' Batalha	Stadium: Estádio da Luz

23 December 1956 15	Sporting	1–0	Benfica	Lisbon
	Sarmento 17'			Stadium: Estádio José Alvalade; Referee: Inocêncio Calabote

30 December 1956 16	Benfica	6–0	Covilhã	Lisbon
	Salvador 1', 13', 50', 88'; Águas 72', 73'			Stadium: Estádio da Luz; Referee: Braga Barros

6 January 1957 17	Porto	3–0	Benfica	Porto
	Jaburú 22'; José Maria 59'; Hernâni 90'			Stadium: Estádio das Antas; Referee: Paulo de Oliveira

13 January 1957 18	Benfica	6–0	CUF	Lisbon
	Águas 46', 48', 57' (pen.), 84', 87'; Salvador 71'			Stadium: Estádio da Luz

20 January 1957 19	Caldas	1–4	Benfica	Caldas da Rainha
	Sarrazola 65'		3', 62' Cavém; Águas 26', 43'

27 January 1957 20	Benfica	2–2	Belenenses	Lisbon
	Salvador 11'; Águas 27'		54' Di Pace; 83' Bezerra	Stadium: Estádio da Luz; Referee: Hermínio Soares

3 February 1957 21	Atlético	0–5	Benfica	Lisbon
			52', 60' Chipenda; 70', 85' Coluna; 75' (pen.) Águas	Stadium: Estádio da Tapadinha

10 February 1957 22	Benfica	3–0	Oriental	Lisbon
	Cavém 22', 58'; Águas 82' (pen.)			Stadium: Estádio da Luz

24 February 1957 23	Vitória de Setúbal	2–3	Benfica	Setúbal
	Jacinto 20'; Miguel 45'		22' Coluna; 51' Pegado; 60' Cavém	Stadium: Campo dos Arcos

10 March 1957 24	Benfica	10–1	Barreirense	Lisbon
	Águas 4', 5', 48' (pen.), 55'; Caiado 30'; Salvador 32', 81'; Palmeiro 54', 57'; Cavém 78'		60' Amândio	Stadium: Estádio da Luz

13 March 1957 25	Torreense	1–1	Benfica	Torres Vedras
	Morais 75'		20' Águas

31 March 1957 26	Benfica	2–0	Académica	Lisbon
	Pegado 52'; Salvador 55'		André (red card)	Stadium: Estádio da Luz; Referee: Vieira da Costa

=== Taça de Portugal ===
==== Round of 16 ====
18 April 1957 First leg	Benfica	0–0	Caldas	Lisbon
				Stadium: Estádio da Luz

21 April 1957 Second leg	Caldas	0–3 (0–3 agg.)	Benfica	Caldas da Rainha
			Leonel Pegado; José Águas	Stadium: Campo da Mata; Referee: Álvaro Rodrigues

==== Quarter-Finals ====
25 April 1957 First leg	Torreense	1–1	Benfica	Torres Vedras
			37' Manuel Azevedo	Stadium: Estádio Manuel Marques; Referee: Eduardo Gouveia

28 April 1957 Second leg	Benfica	2–2 (3–3 agg.)	Torreense	Lisbon
	Manuel Azevedo 64'; Francisco Calado 84'			Stadium: Estádio da Luz; Referee: Joaquim Campos

9 May 1957 Replay	Benfica	4–0 (7–3 agg.)	Torreense	Lisbon
	Cavém 17'; Pegado 59'; Manuel 72 (o.g.); Manuel Azevedo 77'			Stadium: Estádio da Tapadinha; Referee: Paulo de Oliveira

==== Semi-Finals ====
12 May 1957 First leg	Barreirense	0–1	Benfica	Barreiro
			13' Salvador Martins	Stadium: Estádio Dr. Manuel de Mello; Referee: Mário Mendonça

19 May 1957 Second leg	Benfica	4–0 (5–0 agg.)	Barreirense	Lisbon
	Azevedo 28'; Calado 34'; Antunes 48'; Coluna 71'			Stadium: Estádio da Luz; Referee: Álvaro Rodrigues

==== Final ====
2 June 1957	Benfica	3–1	Covilhã	Lisbon
	Martins 12'; Águas 15'; Coluna 87'		19' Pires	Stadium: Estádio Nacional; Referee: Francisco Guerra

=== Latin Cup ===
==== Semi-Final ====
20 June 1957	Benfica	1–0	Saint-Étienne	Madrid, Spain
19:30 UTC+1	Calado 17'			Stadium: Santiago Bernabéu Stadium; Attendance: 80,000; Referee: Daniel Zariquiegui Izco (Spain)

==== Final ====
23 June 1957	Real Madrid	1–0	Benfica	Madrid, Spain
21:30 UTC+1	Di Stéfano 50'		(red card) Zézinho	Stadium: Santiago Bernabéu Stadium; Attendance: 90,000; Referee: Marcel Lequesne (France)

=== Friendlies ===
2 September 1956; Inauguration of the Castelo Branco Municipal Stadium	Benfica	0–1	Covilhã	Castelo Branco
				Stadium: Estádio Municipal Vale do Romeiro

17 February 1957; Atlético Festival	Benfica	0–2	Belenenses

10 April 1957; José Ricardo Domingues Júnior Cup	Benfica	4–1	BENFICA (aspirants)

30 June 1957	Benfica	2–5	Vasco da Gama	Lisbon
	Águas 21', 75'		19' Sabará; 46' Pinga; 63' Lizinho; 69', 71' Walter	Stadium: Estádio da Luz; Referee: Joaquim Campos

6 July 1957	Flamengo	1–1	Benfica	Rio de Janeiro
	Duca 1'		45' Águas	Stadium: Maracanã Stadium; Attendance: 60000; Referee: Gama Melcher

13 July 1957	Flamengo	0–0	Benfica	Rio de Janeiro
			(red card) Manuel Serra	Stadium: Maracanã Stadium; Attendance: 60000; Referee: Gama Melcher

17 July 1957	América	1–1	Benfica	Rio de Janeiro
	Romeiro 18'; Canário (red card) 40'; Lucio (red card) 40'		71' Coluna	Stadium: Maracanã Stadium; Referee: Frederico Lopes

23 July 1957	Santos	3–2	Benfica	Santos
	Pelé 7'; Tite 32', 43'		26' Cavém; 54' Águas	Stadium: Vila Belmiro; Referee: Dino Pacini

25 July 1957	Palmeiras	0–3	Benfica	São Paulo
			89' (pen.) Águas	Stadium: Estádio do Pacaembu; Attendance: 30000; Referee: João Rodrigues

28 July 1957	Bahia	4–1	Benfica	Bahia
				Stadium: Estádio Octávio Mangabeira; Referee: Cavalcanti Brito

30 July 1957	Bahia	1–2	Benfica	Bahia
	Carlito 51'		9' Águas; 20' Cavém	Stadium: Estádio Octávio Mangabeira; Referee: Cavalcanti Brito

2 August 1957	Santa Cruz	1–1	Benfica	Recife
	Paraiba 42'		28' Palmeiro	Stadium: Estádio do Arruda; Attendance: 18000; Referee: Paulo Simões

4 August 1957	Tuno Lusa	1–3	Benfica	Belém
	Juvenil 42'		Águas; Azevedo; Cavém	Stadium: Estádio Evandro Almeida

7 August 1957	New England team	0–10	Benfica	Fall River
			10' Coluna; 18' Caiado; 27', 30' Águas; 33' (o.g.) Bernardo; 49' Salvador; 58', 78' Pegado; 68' Azevedo; 88' Palmeiro	Stadium: Mark's Stadium; Attendance: 15000

11 August 1957	NASL team	2–7	Benfica	New York City
	Mac Laughlin 81'; Gulhot 83'		28', 68', 69' Águas; 31', 67' Cavém; 70' Azevedo; 74' Chipenda	Stadium: Downing Stadium; Referee: James Maclean

== Player statistics ==
The squad for the season consisted of the players listed in the tables below, as well as staff member Otto Glória (manager).

Note 1: Note: Flags indicate national team as defined under FIFA eligibility rules. Players may hold more than one non-FIFA nationality.

Note 2: Players with squad numbers marked ‡ joined the club during the 1956-57 season via transfer, with more details in the following section.

No.	Pos	Nat	Player	Total		Primeira Divisão		Taça de Portugal		Latin Cup	
No.	Pos	Nat	Player	Apps	Goals	Apps	Goals	Apps	Goals	Apps	Goals
1	GK	(Portugal) POR	Costa Pereira	4	0	0	0	0	0	4	0
1	GK	(Portugal) POR	José Bastos	32	0	26	0	4	0	2	0
	MF	(Portugal) POR	Artur Santos	23	0	23	0	0	0	0	0
	DF	(Portugal) POR	Jacinto Marques	24	0	19	0	5	0	0	0
	DF	(Mozambique) MOZ	José Naldo	3	0	1	0	2	0	0	0
	DF	(Portugal) POR	Mário João	0	0	0	0	0	0	0	0
2	DF	(Portugal) POR	Ângelo Martins	31	0	23	0	6	0	2	0
3	DF	(Portugal) POR	Manuel Serra	13	0	3	0	8	0	2	0
4	DF	(Portugal) POR	Zézinho	11	0	5	0	4	0	2	0
	MF	(Portugal) POR	Leonel Pegado	27	5	21	3	6	2	0	0
5	MF	(Portugal) POR	Alfredo Abrantes	29	0	24	0	3	0	2	0
6	MF	(Portugal) POR	Fernando Caiado	19	4	15	4	2	0	2	0
7	MF	(Portugal) POR	Francisco Calado	19	3	12	0	5	2	2	1
	FW	(Portugal) POR	António Mendes	0	0	0	0	0	0	0	0
	FW	(Angola) ANG	Chipenda	2	2	2	2	0	0	0	0
	FW	(Portugal) POR	Isidro Santos	10	3	10	3	0	0	0	0
	FW	(Portugal) POR	Joaquim Santana	2	0	2	0	0	0	0	0
	FW	(Portugal) POR	Manuel Azevedo	5	4	0	0	5	4	0	0
	FW	(Portugal) POR	Palmeiro Antunes	8	3	4	2	4	1	0	0
	FW	(Portugal) POR	Salvador Martins	31	15	24	13	7	2	0	0
8	FW	(Portugal) POR	Francisco Palmeiro	8	3	5	3	1	0	2	0
10	FW	(Portugal) POR	Mário Coluna	29	7	20	5	7	2	2	0
9	FW	(Portugal) POR	José Águas	34	33	25	30	7	3	2	0
11	FW	(Portugal) POR	Domiciano Cavém	32	11	22	10	8	1	2	0

== Transfers ==
=== In ===
Position	Player	From	Fee	Ref
FW	Palmeiro Antunes	CUF	Undisclosed	

=== Out ===
Position	Player	To	Fee	Ref
DF	Fernando Gato	Estoril Praia	Undisclosed	
DF	Rogério	Caldas S.C.	Undisclosed	
MF	Augusto Monteiro	S.C.U. Torreense	Undisclosed	
FW	Fialho	Lusitano de Évora	Undisclosed	
FW	Jaruga	Unidos Sambrazense	Undisclosed	
