= 1954–55 S.L. Benfica season =

Benfica
1954–55 season
- President: Joaquim Ferreira Bogalho
- Head coach: Otto Glória
- Stadium: Estádio da Luz
- Primeira Divisão: 1st
- Taça de Portugal: Winners
- Torneio Internacional Charles Miller: 4th
- Small Club World Cup: 3rd
- Top goalscorer: League: José Águas (20); All: José Águas (26)
- Biggest win: Benfica 11–0 Boavista (3 October 1954)
- Biggest defeat: Barreirense 3–0 Benfica (21 November 1954); Porto 3–0 Benfica (20 March 1955)
Home colours	Away colours

The 1954–55 season was Sport Lisboa e Benfica's 51st season in existence and the club's 21st consecutive season in the top flight of Portuguese football, covering the period from 1 August 1954 to 30 July 1955. Benfica competed in the Primeira Divisão and in the Taça de Portugal.

The season marked a major turning point in the club's history, combining sporting success with structural transformation. Under president Joaquim Ferreira Bogalho and new manager Otto Glória, the club fully embraced professionalism and reshaped its squad with additions such as Coluna and Costa Pereira. Midway through the campaign, Benfica inaugurated the new Estádio da Luz, hosting FC Porto in the opening match and facing the very popular Real Madrid a week later. On the pitch, the team won a tightly contested Primeira Divisão title on the final day and completed the domestic double by defeating Sporting CP in the Taça de Portugal final. The season concluded with international appearances in Brazil and Venezuela, including the Torneio Internacional Charles Miller and the Small Club World Cup.

== Season summary ==
Benfica entered the season aiming to reclaim the league title after a period of Sporting dominance. In the nine previous seasons, Belenenses had won one championship, Benfica one, and Sporting the remaining seven, including the last four consecutively. President Joaquim Ferreira Bogalho sought to reverse this trend by modernizing and professionalizing the club's structure. To achieve this, he appointed the Brazilian manager Otto Glória. Glória insisted that all players become full professionals rather than the semi-professionals the club had relied on previously. As a result, the off-season saw several departures, most notably Rosário, Félix Antunes and Rogério Pipi, while a number of new players arrived, including future stars Coluna and Costa Pereira.

Benfica began the season by hosting Vitória de Setúbal and winning 5–0. In the following matchday, the team travelled to Guimarães to face Vitória de Guimarães, losing 2–1. They responded with five consecutive victories, including a 2–1 away win against Belenenses. However, they ended the month with a 1–0 home loss to Braga, finishing October in first place, level on points with Sporting.

November began with two decisive clashes. First, Benfica visited Sporting in the Derby de Lisboa, winning 1–0. They then hosted Porto in O Clássico at the Estádio Nacional, also winning 1–0. These two important victories were followed by a 3–0 away defeat to Barreirense. In December, Benfica played only one league match, defeating Académica 3–1 and ending the year in first place with a one-point advantage, as Sporting dropped points in the same round. On 1 December, the club inaugurated the new Estádio da Luz, hosting Porto in the opening match, and seven days later welcomed Europe's most popular team, Real Madrid.

Benfica began the new year with a win at the Estádio da Tapadinha, but followed it with a 1–0 away loss to Vitória de Setúbal. The team reacted with two consecutive victories. In February, Benfica recorded mixed results, winning twice and drawing twice, the second draw coming against Belenenses, and ended the month with a two-point lead over Belenenses.

Benfica started March with a 1–0 away win to Braga and then dropped points consecutively. First, they drew 1–1 at home against Sporting, which reduced Benfica's lead to a single point, and next they lost 3–0 to Porto in O Clássico. These results dropped the team to second place, one point behind Belenenses.

Trailing Belenenses by one point, Benfica defeated Barreirense and Académica, ensuring that the league title would be decided on the final matchday, with Sporting two points behind Belenenses and Benfica one point behind. On the last day, Benfica won 3–0 against Atlético, a result that would not have been enough on its own, as Belenenses were leading 2–1 against Sporting. However, a goal in the 80th minute by Mokuna levelled the match at 2–2, and that draw handed Benfica the league title.

After claiming the league title, the team turned its attention to the Taça de Portugal. A home draw against CUF in the first round required a replay, which Benfica won 5–1. Comfortable victories over Barreirense, Braga, and Académica followed, sending the team to the final. On 12 June, Benfica faced Sporting at the Estádio Nacional, winning 2–1 with two goals from Arsénio.

With official competitions concluded, Benfica travelled to Brazil to participate in the Torneio Internacional Charles Miller, marking the club's first matches in South America. They finished fourth but left a strong impression, notably after defeating Peñarol and Palmeiras. The team then competed in the Small Club World Cup in Caracas, finishing third, just one point behind the winners, São Paulo.

== Competitions ==
Win Draw Loss Postponed

=== Overall record ===
Competition	First match	Last match	Record								
Competition	First match	Last match	G	W	D	L	GF	GA	GD	Win %	Source
Primeira Divisão	12 September 1954	24 April 1954	26	18	3	5	61	20	+41	69.23	
Taça de Portugal	8 May 1955	12 June 1955	6	5	1	0	24	5	+19	83.33	
Total			32	23	4	5	85	25	+60	71.88	

=== Primeira Divisão ===
==== League table ====
Pos	Team	Pld	W	D	L	GF	GA	GD	Pts	Qualification or relegation
1	Benfica (C)	26	18	3	5	61	20	+41	39	
2	Belenenses	26	17	5	4	63	28	+35	39	
3	Sporting	26	15	7	4	73	27	+46	37	Qualification for the European Cup first round
4	Porto	26	12	6	8	51	34	+17	30	
5	Braga	26	12	5	9	52	42	+10	29	

Source: rsssf.com
(C) Champions

==== Results by round ====
Round	1	2	3	4	5	6	7	8	9	10	11	12	13	14	15	16	17	18	19	20	21	22	23	24	25	26
Ground	H	A	A	H	A	H	A	H	A	H	A	H	A	A	H	H	A	H	A	H	A	H	A	H	A	H
Result	W	L	W	W	W	W	W	L	W	W	L	W	W	L	W	W	W	D	W	D	W	D	L	W	W	W
Position	1	4	2	1	1	1	1	1	1	1	2	1	1	1	1	1	1	1	1	1	1	1	2	2	2	1

Source: ForaDeJogo
A = Away; H = Home; W = Win; D = Draw; L = Loss

==== Matches ====
12 September 1954 1	Benfica	5–0	Vitória de Setúbal	Lisbon
	Arsénio 5'; Salvador 25'; José Águas 46'; Coluna 50', 65'			Stadium: Estádio Nacional; Referee: Vieira da Costa

19 September 1954 2	Vitória de Guimarães	2–1	Benfica	Guimarães
	Rola 34', 66'		35' Coluna	Stadium: Campo da Amorosa; Referee: Paulo de Oliveira

26 September 1954 3	Lusitano de Évora	0–2	Benfica	Évora
			9' Águas; 69' Coluba	Stadium: Campo Estrela; Referee: Libertino Domingues

3 October 1954 4	Benfica	11–0	Boavista	Lisbon
	Lourenço 6' (o.g.); Águas 9', 75'; Palmeiro 23', 85'; Coluna 31', 58', 63'; Calado 43'; Salvador 70'; Fialho 71'			Stadium: Estádio Nacional; Referee: Paulo de Oliveira

10 October 1954 5	CUF	0–1	Benfica	Barreiro
			75' Águas	Stadium: Campo de Santa Bárbara; Referee: Vieira da Costa

17 October 1954 6	Benfica	2–1	Covilhã	Lisbon
	Fialho 33'; Palmeiro 40'			Stadium: Estádio Nacional; Referee: Abel da Costa

24 October 1954 7	Belenenses	1–2	Benfica	Lisbon
	Matateu 32'		52' Palmeiro; 79' Coluna	Stadium: Estádio José Manuel Soares; Referee: Álvaro Rodrigues

31 October 1954 8	Benfica	0–1	Braga	Lisbon
			67' Imbelloni	Stadium: Estádio Nacional; Referee: Domingos Miranda

7 November 1954 9	Sporting	0–1	Benfica	Lisbon
			57' (pen.) Calado	Stadium: Estádio Engenheiro Carlos Salema; Referee: Álvaro Rodrigues

14 November 1954 10	Benfica	1–0	Porto	Lisbon
	Águas 63'			Stadium: Estádio Nacional; Referee: Paulo de Oliveira

21 November 1954 11	Barreirense	3–0	Benfica	Barreiro
	José Ferreira 57', 58'; Vasques 60'			Stadium: Estádio Dr. Manuel de Mello; Referee: Álvaro Rodrigues

12 December 1954 12	Benfica	3–1	Académica	Lisbon
	Coluna 25'; Águas 53'; Du Fialho 83'		73' Abreu	Stadium: Estádio Nacional; Referee: Correia da Costa

2 January 1955 13	Atlético	1–2	Benfica	Lisbon
	Ben David 71'		36' Águas; 46' Calado	Stadium: Estádio da Tapadinha

9 January 1955 14	Vitória de Setúbal	1–0	Benfica	Setúbal
	Bastos 21'			Stadium: Campo dos Arcos

16 January 1955 15	Benfica	4–0	Vitória de Guimarães	Lisbon
	Abrantes 2'; Águas 22', 58'; Calado 63'			Stadium: Estádio da Luz

23 January 1955 16	Benfica	7–1	Lusitano de Évora	Lisbon
	Fialho 15'; Águas 29', 47', 53', 67'; Coluna 44', 89'		56' José Pedro	Stadium: Estádio da Luz

6 February 1955 17	Boavista	0–3	Benfica	Porto
			79' Abrantes; 80' Coluna; 86' Águas

13 February 1955 18	Benfica	1–1	CUF	Lisbon
	Fialho 1'		11' Pedro Duarte	Stadium: Estádio da Luz

20 February 1955 19	Covilhã	0–1	Benfica	Covilhã
			83' Arsénio

27 February 1955 20	Benfica	0–0	Belenenses	Lisbon
				Stadium: Estádio da Luz

6 March 1955 21	Braga	0–1	Benfica	Braga
			3' Arsénio	Stadium: Estádio 28 de Maio

13 March 1955 22	Benfica	1–1	Sporting	Lisbon
	Coluna 4'		61' (o.g.) Artur Santos	Stadium: Estádio da Luz

20 March 1955 23	Porto	3–0	Benfica	Porto
	Costa 15', 62'; Maria 60'			Stadium: Estádio das Antas; Referee: Álvaro Rodrigues

3 April 1955 24	Benfica	2–0	Barreirense	Lisbon
	Ângelo 82'; Coluna 90'			Stadium: Estádio da Luz

17 April 1955 25	Académica	3–7	Benfica	Coimbra
	Duarte 13'; Bentes 50'; André 72'		27' Calado; 34', 43', 51' Águas; 57' Arsénio; 78' Zézinho; 87' Caiado	Stadium: Estádio Municipal de Coimbra; Referee: Braga Barros

24 April 1955 26	Benfica	3–0	Atlético	Lisbon
	Águas 29', 48'; Germano 47' (o.g.)			Stadium: Estádio da Luz

=== Taça de Portugal ===
==== First round ====
8 May 1955	Benfica	2–2 (a.e.t)	CUF	Lisbon
	Coluna 42'; Arsénio 107'			Stadium: Estádio da Luz

10 May 1955 Replay	CUF	1–5 (1–7 agg.)	Benfica	Barreiro
			31', 44' Arsénio; 52' Águas; 57' Coluna; 70' Caiado	Stadium: Campo de Santa Bárbara

==== Round of 16 ====
15 May 1955	Benfica	5–0	Barreirense	Lisbon
	Arsénio 2', 43'; Águas 58', 62', 81'			Stadium: Estádio da Luz; Referee: Álvaro Rodrigues

==== Quarter-finals ====
15 May 1955	Braga	1–4	Benfica	Braga
	Corona 86'		3', 51', 84' Arsénio; 75' Palmeiro	Stadium: Estádio de 28 de Maio; Referee: Vieira da Costa

==== Semi-finals ====
5 June 1955	Benfica	6–0	Académica	Santarém
	Coluna 16'; Arsénio 18', 85'; Águas 55', 81'; Caiado 63'			Stadium: Campo Alfredo Aguiar; Referee: Abel da Costa

==== Final ====
12 June 1955	Benfica	2–1	Sporting	Lisbon
	Arsénio 63', 65'		47' Martins	Stadium: Estádio Nacional; Referee: Vieira da Costa

=== Non-official matches ===
29 August 1954 Pina Manique Cup	Benfica	1–0	Belenenses	Lisbon
	Salvador			Stadium: Estádio Pina Manique

5 September 1954; Tribute to Rogério de Carvalho	Benfica	1–0	Porto	Lisbon
				Stadium: Estádio Nacional; Attendance: 30000

20 September 1954; Ovar City Council cup	Ovarense	3–6	Benfica	Ovar
				Stadium: Estádio Marques da Silva

5 October 1954 Atlético-Benfica Festival	Benfica	2–1	Benfica Atlético	Lisbon
	Rogério 2.ª 52'; Isidro 75'		87' Rosário	Stadium: Estádio da Tapadinha

1 December 1954 Inauguration of the Sport Lisboa e Benfica Stadium	Benfica	1–3	Porto	Lisbon
	Palmeiro 10'		5' Jacinto; 58' Duarte; 63' Perdigão	Stadium: Estádio da Luz; Attendance: 40000

5 December 1954; Engineer Rui Gonçalves Cup	Benfica	7–2	Belenenses	Lisbon
	Calado 9', 12'; Águas 11', 88'; Coluna 30', 39', 50'; Palmeiro 51'		45' Perez; 58' Dimas	Stadium: Estádio da Luz

8 December 1954 Celebrations at Sport Lisboa e Benfica Stadium	Benfica	0–2	Real Madrid	Lisbon
			40' Joseíto; 60' Di Stéfano	Stadium: Estádio da Luz; Attendance: 40000

29 January 1955	Beira-Mar	1–8	Benfica	Aveiro
				Stadium: Estádio Mário Duarte

==== Torneio Internacional Charles Miller ====
Pos	Team	Pld	W	D	L	GF	GA	GD	Pts	Result
1	(Brazil) Corinthians	5	4	1	0	12	5	+7	9	Champion
2	(Brazil) America	5	3	1	1	12	7	+5	7	
3	(Brazil) Flamengo	5	3	0	2	8	8	0	6	
4	(Portugal) Benfica	5	2	0	3	7	8	−1	4	
5	(Brazil) Palmeiras	5	0	2	3	9	13	−4	2	
6	(Uruguay) Peñarol	5	0	2	3	6	12	−6	2	

Source: RSSSF

19 June 1955	Flamengo	1–0	Benfica	Rio de Janeiro
	Evaristo			Stadium: Maracanã Stadium; Referee: Whasington Rodriguez

26 June 1955	Benfica	2–0	Peñarol	Rio de Janeiro
			Coluna; Águas	Stadium: Maracanã Stadium

29 June 1955	Palmeiras	1–2	Benfica	São Paulo
	Nei		Águas; Palmeiro	Stadium: Estádio do Pacaembu

3 July 1955	América	4–2	Benfica	Rio de Janeiro
	Alarcón; Ferreira; Washington; Leônidas		Caiado; Águas	Stadium: Maracanã Stadium

10 July 1955	Corinthians	2–1	Benfica	São Paulo
	Cláudio 38' (pen.), 41'		30' Águas	Stadium: Estádio do Pacaembu

==== Small Club World Cup ====
Team	Pts	P	W	D	L	GF	GA	GD
(Brazil) São Paulo	7	6	3	2	1	11	8	3
(Spain) Valencia	6	6	2	2	2	11	9	2
(Portugal) Benfica	6	6	2	2	2	11	10	1
(Venezuela) La Salle	4	6	1	2	3	7	13	-6

17 July 1955	Benfica	3–4	Valencia	Caracas
	25' Águas; 49', 85' Coluna		Fuertes 9', 67'; Pasieguito 43'; Wilkes 57'	Stadium: Estádio Olímpico de la Universidad Central de Venezuela; Attendance: 35000

21 July 1955	Benfica	0–0	São Paulo FC	Caracas
				Stadium: Estádio Olímpico de la Universidad Central de Venezuela

23 July 1955	La Salle F.C.	1–4	Benfica	Caracas
	Padin 28'		53' Arsénio; 65' Salvador; 70' (o.g.) Chano; Calado	Stadium: Estádio Olímpico de la Universidad Central de Venezuela

26 July 1955	Benfica	2–4	São Paulo FC	Caracas
			41', 46' Sani; 57' Maurinho; 83' Teixeirinha	Stadium: Estádio Olímpico de la Universidad Central de Venezuela

31 July 1955	Benfica	2–1	Valencia	Caracas
	Águas 16', 70'		44' Wilkes	Stadium: Estádio Olímpico de la Universidad Central de Venezuela; Attendance: 30000

2 August 1955	La Salle F.C.	0–0	Benfica	Caracas
				Stadium: Estádio Olímpico de la Universidad Central de Venezuela

== Player statistics ==
The squad for the season consisted of the players listed in the tables below, as well as staff member Otto Glória (manager).

Note 1: Note: Flags indicate national team as defined under FIFA eligibility rules. Players may hold more than one non-FIFA nationality.

Note 2: Players with squad numbers marked ‡ joined the club during the 1954-55 season via transfer, with more details in the following section.

No.	Pos	Nat	Player	Total		Primeira Divisão		Taça de Portugal	
No.	Pos	Nat	Player	Apps	Goals	Apps	Goals	Apps	Goals
1	GK	(Portugal) POR	Costa Pereira	32	0	26	0	6	0
1	GK	(Portugal) POR	José Bastos	3	0	3	0	0	0
	DF	(Mozambique) MOZ	José Naldo	12	0	12	0	0	0
2	DF	(Portugal) POR	Jacinto Marques	32	0	26	0	6	0
3	DF	(Portugal) POR	Ângelo Martins	27	1	21	1	6	0
	MF	(Portugal) POR	Augusto Monteiro	2	0	0	0	2	0
	MF	(Cape Verde) CPV	Du Fialho	17	5	17	5	0	0
	MF	(Portugal) POR	Francisco Calado	27	5	25	5	2	0
	MF	(Portugal) POR	Leonel Pegado	1	0	1	0	0	0
	MF	(Portugal) POR	Vieirinha	0	0	0	0	0	0
4	MF	(Portugal) POR	Fernando Caiado	30	3	24	1	6	2
5	MF	(Portugal) POR	Artur Santos	32	0	26	0	6	0
6	MF	(Portugal) POR	Alfredo Abrantes	18	2	14	2	4	0
7	MF	(Portugal) POR	Zézinho	7	1	2	1	5	0
	FW	(Portugal) POR	Joaquim Santana	0	0	0	0	0	0
	FW	(Portugal) POR	Manuel Azevedo	4	0	4	0	0	0
	FW	(Portugal) POR	Romeu	0	0	0	0	0	0
	FW	(Portugal) POR	Salvador Martins	9	2	9	2	0	0
8	FW	(Portugal) POR	Arsénio Duarte	16	16	10	4	6	12
9	FW	(Portugal) POR	José Águas	32	26	26	20	6	6
10	FW	(Portugal) POR	Mário Coluna	32	17	26	14	6	3
11	FW	(Portugal) POR	Francisco Palmeiro	22	5	17	4	5	1

== Transfers ==
=== In ===
Position	Player	From	Fee	Ref
GK	Costa Pereira	Clube Ferroviário de Maputo	Undisclosed	
MF	Alfredo Abrantes	Clube Oriental de Lisboa	Undisclosed	
MF	Augusto Monteiro	S.C.U. Torreense	Undisclosed	
FW	Manuel Azevedo	S.C. Beira-Mar	Undisclosed	
FW	Mário Coluna	Desportivo Maputo	Undisclosed	

=== Out ===
Position	Player	To	Fee	Ref
GK	Bráulio Garcia	Clube Oriental de Lisboa	Undisclosed	
GK	Sebastião da Silva	Estoril Praia	Undisclosed	
DF	Félix Antnes	S.C.U. Torreense	Undisclosed	
MF	Amadeu Zeferino	Angústias A.C.	Undisclosed	
MF	António Manuel	S.C.U. Torreense	Undisclosed	
MF	Francisco Costa	Vitória de Guimarães	Undisclosed	
MF	Francisco Moreira	Clube Olímpico do Montijo	Undisclosed	
MF	Rosário	Atlético Clube de Portugal	Undisclosed	
FW	Mário Rui	Clube Oriental de Lisboa	Undisclosed	
FW	Rogério Pipi	Clube Oriental de Lisboa	Undisclosed	
