= 1958–59 S.L. Benfica season =

Benfica
1958–59 season
- President: Maurício Vieira de Brito
- Head coach: Otto Glória (until 13 March 1959); José Alberto Valdivieso
- Stadium: Estádio da Luz
- Primeira Divisão: 2nd
- Taça de Portugal: Winners
- Top goalscorer: League: José Águas (26); All: José Águas (29)
- Biggest win: Benfica 7–0 Vitória de Guimarães (14 September 1958)
- Biggest defeat: Belenenses 3–1 Benfica (1 July 1959)
Home colours	Away colours

The 1958–59 season was Sport Lisboa e Benfica's 55rd season in existence and the club's 25rd consecutive season in the top flight of Portuguese football, covering the period from 1 September 1956 to 30 August 1957. Benfica competed in the Primeira Divisão and in the Taça de Portugal.

In the fifth under manager Otto Glória. After tightly contested title race, Benfica lost the league title in the last matchday, finishing tied on points with Porto, but with a worst goal difference. The team then won the Taça de Portugal, with a 1–0 victory over Porto in the final.

== Season summary ==
Benfica entered the season seeking to reclaim the league title after failing to retain it in the previous campaign. Manager Otto Glória remained in charge for a fifth consecutive season.

Benfica began the season with a 7–0 win against Vitória de Guimarães. In the next match, Benfica visited Caldas, drawing 1–1. Next, the they hosted Académica, winning 5–0, but in the next matchday once again dropped points in a draw with Covilhã. The team responded with three wins, finishing October in first place with a two-point advantage.

November started with 5–1 home win over Braga, before visiting Estádio das Antas to face Béla Guttmann's Porto in O Clássico, drawing in a goalless match. A win over Vitória de Setúbal, was followed by another goalless away draw with Lusitano de Évora, before hosting Sporting in the first Derby de Lisboa of the season, which Benfica won 4–0 with Águas and Mendes scoring a brace each. This result was followed by an away win over CUF and an away loss with Vitória de Guimarães, with Benfica finishing the year in first place with a one-point advantage.

The new year began with a 3–0 win over Caldas, followed by five consecutive wins, which meant Benfica reached the decisive O Clássico with a three-point advantage. The match ended in a draw, but an away draw with Vitória de Setúbal reduced Benfica's lead to two points. In the next matchday Benfica defeated Lusitano de Évora, but one week later a 2–1 loss to Sporting at Estádio José Alvalade cost them the first place, now tied on points with Porto but with a worst goal difference. In the last matchday, they defeated CUF 7–1, but as Porto had also won their match, Benfica finished second with the same points as Porto. The match was controversial with the game starting later than scheduled and Benfica having three penalties awarded.

After failing to win the league title, Benfica competed in the Taça de Portugal. The team defeated Covilhã, 4–2 on aggragate, in the round of 32, Tirsense 7–0 in the round of 16 and then faced Belenenses in the quarter-finals. After losing 3–1 in the first leg, Benfica defeated Belenenses 3–0 in the second leg, advancing to the semi-finals, where they would meet Sporting. As in the previous round, Benfica lost 2–1 in the first leg, but a 3–1 win in the second leg allowed them to qualify for the final. Before the final, manager Otto Glória left the club with Argentinian manager José Alberto Valdivieso assuming. On 19 July, Benfica defeated Porto with a sole goal from Cavém on the first minute, winning its tenth Taça de Portugal.

== Competitions ==
Win Draw Loss Postponed

=== Overall record ===
Competition	First match	Last match	Record								
Competition	First match	Last match	G	W	D	L	GF	GA	GD	Win %	Source
Primeira Divisão	14 September 1958	22 March 1959	26	17	7	2	78	20	+58	65.38	
Taça de Portugal	3 May 1959	19 July 1959	9	6	1	2	20	8	+12	66.67	
Total			35	23	8	4	98	28	+70	65.71	

=== Primeira Divisão ===
==== League table ====
Pos	Team	Pld	W	D	L	GF	GA	GD	Pts	Qualification or relegation
1	Porto (C)	26	17	7	2	81	22	+59	41	Qualification to European Cup preliminary round and Latin Cup
2	Benfica	26	17	7	2	78	20	+58	41	
3	Belenenses	26	16	6	4	65	27	+38	38	
4	Sporting CP	26	12	7	7	50	28	+22	31	
5	Vitória de Guimarães	26	13	3	10	59	55	+4	29	

Source: rsssf.com
(C) Champions

==== Results by round ====
Round	1	2	3	4	5	6	7	8	9	10	11	12	13	14	15	16	17	18	20	21	22	23	24	25	19	26
Ground	H	A	H	A	A	H	A	H	A	H	A	H	A	A	H	A	H	H	H	A	H	A	H	A	A	H
Result	W	D	W	D	W	W	W	W	D	W	D	W	W	L	W	W	W	W	W	W	D	D	W	L	D	W
Position	5	3	3	1	1	1	1	1	1	1	1	1	1	1	1	1	1	1	1	1	1	1	1	2	2	2

Source: ForaDeJogo
A = Away; H = Home; W = Win; D = Draw; L = Loss

==== Matches ====
14 September 1958 1	Benfica	7–0	Vitória de Guimarães	Lisbon
	Cavém 15', 74', 75'; Águas 22', 31'; Mendes 60', 78'			Stadium: Estádio da Luz; Referee: Manuel Barulho

21 September 1958 2	Caldas	1–1	Benfica	Caldas da Rainha
	Lenine 7'		90'Águas	Stadium: Campo da Mata; Referee: Jovino Pinto

28 September 1958 3	Benfica	5–0	Académica	Lisbon
	Cavém 20', 58'; Águas 34', 51', 84'			Stadium: Estádio da Luz; Referee: Clemente Henriques

5 October 1958 4	Covilhã	1–1	Benfica	Covilhã
	Cavém 14'		60' (pen.) Águas	Stadium: Estádio Municipal José dos Santos Pinto; Referee: Francisco Freitas

12 October 1958 5	Torreense	1–5	Benfica	Torres Vedras
	Saldanha 79'		12' Mendes; 27' (pen.), 83', 87' Águas; 46' Antunes

19 October 1958 6	Benfica	3–2	Belenenses	Lisbon
	Águas 38'; Mendes 79'; Coluna 84'		47', 70' Yaúca	Stadium: Estádio da Luz; Referee: Hermínio Soares

26 October 1958 7	Barreirense	1–3	Benfica	Barreiro
	José Augusto 7'		42' Coluna; 57', 79' Mendes	Stadium: Estádio Dr. Manuel de Mello; Referee: Clemente Henriques

2 November 1958 8	Benfica	5–1	Braga	Lisbon
	Águas 12', 53'; Neto 50'; Coluna 59', 67'		78' Mendonça	Stadium: Estádio da Luz; Referee: Marcos Lobato

9 November 1958 9	Porto	0–0	Benfica	Porto
				Stadium: Estádio das Antas; Referee: Reinaldo Silva

30 November 1958 10	Benfica	3–0	Vitória de Setúbal	Lisbon
	Cavém 7'; Mascarenhas 44'; Águas 62'			Stadium: Estádio da Luz

7 December 1958 11	Lusitano de Évora	0–0	Benfica	Évora
				Stadium: Campo Estrela; Attendance: 20000; Referee: Francisco Guiomar

14 December 1958 12	Benfica	4–0	Sporting	Lisbon
	Mendes 19', 35'; Águas 21', 73'			Stadium: Estádio da Luz; Referee: Décio de Freitas

21 December 1958 13	CUF	1–4	Benfica	Barreiro
	Uria 67'		13', 54' Cavém; 15' Coluna; 80' Chino	Stadium: Campo de Santa Bárbara; Referee: Reinaldo Silva

28 December 1958 14	Vitória de Guimarães	2–1	Benfica	Guimarães
	Rola 50', 76'		86' Coluna	Stadium: Campo de Santa Bárbara

4 January 1959 15	Benfica	3–0	Caldas	Lisbon
	Águas 5'; Cavém 28', 59'			Stadium: Estádio da Luz

11 January 1959 16	Académica	0–3	Benfica	Coimbra
			31', 49' Mendes; 89' Cavém

18 January 1959 17	Benfica	2–1	Covilhã	Lisbon
	Cavém 3'; Águas 36' (pen.)		10' Caldas	Stadium: Estádio da Luz

25 January 1959 18	Benfica	2–0	Torreense	Lisbon
	Cavém 25'; Águas 55'			Stadium: Estádio da Luz

8 February 1959 20	Benfica	6–0	Barreirense	Lisbon
	Palmeiro 31'; Cavém 46', 63', 72'; Coluna 74', 76'			Stadium: Estádio da Luz

15 February 1959 21	Braga	2–4	Benfica	Braga
	Maria 25', 42' (pen.)		12', 65' Cavém; 15' Palmeiro; 35' Martins 75'	Stadium: Estádio 1º de Maio

22 February 1959 22	Benfica	1–1	Porto	Lisbon
	Martins 34'		9' Teixeira	Stadium: Estádio da Luz; Referee: Encarnação Salgado

1 March 1959 23	Vitória de Setúbal	2–2	Benfica	Setúbal
	Fernandes 37'; Mendonça 78'		16', 69' Cavém	Stadium: Campo dos Arcos

8 March 1959 24	Benfica	4–0	Lusitano de Évora	Lisbon
	Águas 14', 41', 59'; Mendes 70'			Stadium: Estádio da Luz

15 March 1959 25	Sporting	2–1	Benfica	Lisbon
	Sarmento 13'; Vasques 53'		16' Cavém	Stadium: Estádio José Alvalade; Referee: Reinaldo Silva

18 March 1959 19	Belenenses	2–2	Benfica	Belém
	Serra 17' (o.g.)		25' Mendes	Stadium: Estádio do Restelo

22 March 1959 26	Benfica	7–1	CUF	Lisbon
	Águas 14' (pen.), 26' (pen.), 56' (pen.), 65'; Mendes 36', 83'; Chino 48'		55' Quaresma	Stadium: Estádio da Luz; Referee: Inocêncio Calabote

=== Taça de Portugal ===
==== Round of 32 ====
3 May 1959 First leg	Covilhã	2–2	Benfica	Covilhã
	Couceiro; Suárez 61'		3' Cavém; 62' Coluna	Stadium: Estádio Municipal José dos Santos Pinto; Referee: Caetano Nogueira

10 May 1959 Second leg	Benfica	2–0 (4–2 agg.)	Caldas	Lisbon
	Coluna 17', 80'			Stadium: Estádio da Luz

==== Round of 16 ====
24 May 1959 First leg	Benfica	4–0	Tirsense	Lisbon
	Chino; Águas			Stadium: Estádio da Luz; Referee: Braga Barros

28 May 1959 Second leg	Covilhã	0–3 (7–0 agg.)	Benfica	Santo Tirso
			Cavém; Águas	Stadium: Estádio Abel Alves de Figueiredo; Referee: Mário Mendonça

==== Quarter-Finals ====
1 July 1959 First leg	Belenenses	3–1	Benfica	Belém
	Tonho 30', 70'; Matateu 59'		80' Coluna	Stadium: Estádio do Restelo; Referee: Francisco Guerra

5 July 1959 Second leg	Benfica	3–0 (4–3 agg.)	Belenenses	Lisbon
	Águas 36'; Coluna 48'; Pires 54' (o.g.)			Stadium: Estádio da Luz

==== Semi-Finals ====
8 July 1959 First leg	Sporting	2–1	Benfica	Lisbon
	Pinto 37'; Vadinho 57'		41' Santana	Stadium: Estádio José Alvalade; Referee: Abel da Costa

13 July 1959 Second leg	Benfica	3–1 (4–3 agg.)	Barreirense	Lisbon
	Mário João 34'; Cavém 37'; Santana 40'		65' Arizaga	Stadium: Estádio da Luz; Referee: Clemente Henriques

==== Final ====
19 July 1959	Benfica	1–0	Porto	Lisbon
	Cavém 1'; Santos (red card)		(red card) Duarte	Stadium: Estádio Nacional; Referee: Décio de Freitas

=== Friendlies ===
31 August 1958; Tribute to Fernando Cabrita	Covilhã	2–2	Benfica	Castelo Branco
				Stadium: Estádio Municipal Vale do Romeiro

7 September 1958; Tribute to José Travaços	Sporting	2–0	Benfica	Lisbon
	Morais 21', 66'			Stadium: Estádio José Alvalade

16 September 1958	Benfica	0–1	Granada	Lisbon
			30' Vasquez	Stadium: Estádio da Luz

23 September 1958; Tribute to Francisco Calado	Benfica	1–0	Sporting	Lisbon
				Stadium: Estádio José Alvalade

1 January 1959	Benfica	1–0	Nîmes Olympique	Lisbon
	Coluna 22'		(red card) 62' Duc	Stadium: Estádio da Luz

5 April 1959	Benfica	4–1	Torreense	Lisbon
	Águas 6'; Vieira Dias 48'; Mendes 53'; Salvador 87'		20' (pen.) Bezerra	Stadium: Estádio da Luz; Referee: Alípio Louro

12 April 1959	Torreense	0–2	Benfica	Torres Vedras
			21' Chino; 89' Salvador	Stadium: Estádio Manuel Marques; Referee: Mário Martins

19 April 1959 Taça Cândido Oliveira	Benfica	3–2	Académica	Lisbon
	Águas 9', 34'; Mendes 19'		24' Maia; 46' Samuel	Stadium: Estádio da Luz; Referee: Eduardo Gouveia

26 April 1959 Taça Costa e Sousa	Académica	0–3	Benfica	Coimbra
				Stadium: Estádio Cidade de Coimbra

27 April 1959	Naval 1º de Maio	1–5	Benfica	Figueira da Foz
				Stadium: Estádio José Bento Pessoa; Referee: José Dias Mendes

31 May 1959	Peniche	2–1	Benfica	Peniche
				Stadium: Campo do Baluarte; Referee: José Agostinho

1 June 1959	Benfica	0–0	América	Lisbon
				Stadium: Estádio da Luz; Referee: Eduardo Gouveia

4 June 1959	Benfica	1–1	Corinthians	Lisbon
	Águas 40' (pen.)		43' Zague	Stadium: Estádio da Luz; Referee: Herminio Soares

10 June 1959 Taça Santarém	Benfica	3–2	Torreense	Santarém
	Palmeiro 2'; Santana 77' Neto 85'		47' Costa; 73' Saldanha	Referee: Manuel Lousada

17 June 1959 Tribute to Fernando Caiado	Benfica	3–2	Boavista	Lisbon
				Stadium: Estádio da Luz

21 June 1959 Tribute to Luís Anica	Benfica	0–8	Montijo	Montijo
				Stadium: Campo Luís Almeida Fidalgo

== Player statistics ==
The squad for the season consisted of the players listed in the tables below, as well as staff member Otto Glória (manager).

Note 1: Note: Flags indicate national team as defined under FIFA eligibility rules. Players may hold more than one non-FIFA nationality.

Note 2: Players with squad numbers marked ‡ joined the club during the 1958-59 season via transfer, with more details in the following section.

No.	Pos	Nat	Player	Total		Primeira Divisão		Taça de Portugal	
No.	Pos	Nat	Player	Apps	Goals	Apps	Goals	Apps	Goals
1	GK	(Portugal) POR	Costa Pereira	30	0	25	0	5	0
1	GK	(Portugal) POR	José Bastos	4	0	1	0	3	0
	DF	(Portugal) POR	Ângelo Martins	25	0	25	0	0	0
	DF	(Portugal) POR	Fernando Ferreira	3	0	3	0	0	0
	DF	(Portugal) POR	Zézinho	8	0	7	0	1	0
2	DF	(Portugal) POR	Manuel Serra	30	0	21	0	9	0
3	DF	(Portugal) POR	Mário João	2	1	0	0	2	1
	MF	(Portugal) POR	Fernando Caiado	1	0	1	0	0	0
	MF	(Portugal) POR	Humberto Fernandes	1	0	1	0	0	0
	MF	(Angola) ANG	Mascarenhas	2	1	2	1	0	0
4	DF	(Portugal) POR	José Neto	28	1	19	1	9	0
5	MF	(Portugal) POR	Artur Santos	35	0	26	0	9	0
6	MF	(Portugal) POR	Alfredo Abrantes	35	0	26	0	9	0
	FW	(Portugal) POR	António Mendes	24	14	19	14	5	0
	FW	(Portugal) POR	António Hilário	9	0	5	0	4	0
	FW	(Portugal) POR	Chino	16	5	13	2	3	3
	FW	(Portugal) POR	Palmeiro Antunes	3	1	2	1	1	0
	FW	(Portugal) POR	Salvador Martins	9	2	9	2	0	0
	FW	(Portugal) POR	Vieira Dias	2	0	2	0	0	0
7	FW	(Portugal) POR	Francisco Palmeiro	13	2	6	2	7	0
8	FW	(Portugal) POR	Joaquim Santana	5	2	1	0	4	2
9	FW	(Portugal) POR	José Águas	33	29	24	26	9	3
10	FW	(Portugal) POR	Mário Coluna	34	13	25	8	9	5
11	FW	(Portugal) POR	Domiciano Cavém	35	26	26	21	9	5

== Transfers ==
=== In ===
Position	Player	From	Fee	Ref
DF	José Neto	C.D. Montijo	Undisclosed	
FW	António Hilário	S.C.U. Torreense	Undisclosed	
FW	Chino	C.S. Marítimo	Undisclosed	

=== Out ===
Position	Player	To	Fee	Ref
GK	Arnaldo Rodrigues	Amarante F.C.	Undisclosed	
DF	Araújo	Académica	Undisclosed	
MF	Hélder Constantino	S.C.U. Torreense	Undisclosed	
FW	Azevedo	S.C.U. Torreense	Undisclosed	
FW	Chipenda	Académica	Undisclosed	
FW	Isidro Santos	S.C.U. Torreense	Undisclosed	
FW	José Maria	Braga	Undisclosed	
