= 1958 Taça de Portugal final =

- Event: 1957–58 Taça de Portugal
Benfica	Porto
0	1
- Date: 15 June 1958
- Venue: Estádio Nacional, Oeiras
- Referee: Álvaro Rodrigues (Coimbra)

The 1958 Taça de Portugal final was the final match of the 1957–58 Taça de Portugal, the 18th season of the Taça de Portugal, the premier Portuguese football cup competition organized by the Portuguese Football Federation (FPF). The match was played on 15 June 1958 at the Estádio Nacional in Oeiras, and opposed two Primeira Liga sides: Benfica and Porto. Porto defeated Benfica 1–0 to claim a second Taça de Portugal.

== Match ==
=== Details ===
15 June 1958

Benfica	0–1	Porto
		Hernâni 52'

Estádio Nacional, Oeiras
Referee: Álvaro Rodrigues (Coimbra)

Benfica	Porto

GK	1	(Portugal) José Bastos
DF		(Portugal) Manuel Serra
DF	2	(Portugal) Zézinho (c)
DF		(Portugal) Mário João
MF		(Portugal) Francisco Calado
MF		(Portugal) Leonel Pegado
MF		(Portugal) Mário Coluna
MF		(Portugal) Francisco Palmeiro
FW		(Portugal) José Águas
FW		(Portugal) José Maria
FW		(Portugal) Manuel Azevedo
Substitutes:
Manager:
(Brazil) Otto Glória

GK	1	(Portugal) Manuel Pinho
DF	2	(Portugal) Virgílio (c)
DF		(Portugal) Miguel Arcanjo
DF		(Portugal) António Barbosa
DF		(Portugal) Ângelo Sarmento
MF		(Brazil) Gastão Gonçalves
MF		(Brazil) Osvaldo Silva
MF		(Portugal) Hernâni
FW		(Portugal) Carlos Duarte
FW		(Portugal) Fernando Perdigão
FW		(Portugal) Albano Sarmento
Substitutes:
Manager:
(Brazil) Otto Bumbel

1957–58 Taça de Portugal Winners
Porto
2nd Title

Match officials

- Assistant referees:
- Fourth official:

Match rules

- 90 minutes.
- 30 minutes of extra time if necessary.

== See also ==
- O Clássico
