= 1955 Taça de Portugal final =

- Event: 1954–55 Taça de Portugal
Benfica	Sporting CP
2	1
- Date: 12 June 1955
- Venue: Estádio Nacional, Oeiras
- Referee: Vieira da Costa (Porto)

The 1955 Taça de Portugal final was the final match of the 1954–55 Taça de Portugal, the 15th season of the Taça de Portugal, the premier Portuguese football cup competition organized by the Portuguese Football Federation (FPF). The match was played on 12 June 1955 at the Estádio Nacional in Oeiras, and opposed two Primeira Liga sides: Benfica and Sporting CP. Benfica defeated Sporting CP 2–1 to claim their eighth Taça de Portugal.

== Match ==
=== Details ===
12 June 1955

Benfica	2–1	Sporting CP
Arsénio 63', 65'		João Martins 47'

Estádio Nacional, Oeiras
Referee: Vieira da Costa (Porto)

Benfica	Sporting CP

GK	1	(Portugal) Alberto da Costa Pereira
DF		(Portugal) Ângelo Martins
DF		(Portugal) Artur Santos
DF		(Portugal) Zézinho
DF		(Portugal) Jacinto Santos
MF		(Portugal) Fernando Caiado
MF		(Portugal) Alfredo Abrantes
MF		(Portugal) Mário Coluna
FW		(Portugal) José Águas
FW		(Portugal) Francisco Palmeiro
FW		(Portugal) Arsénio (c)
Substitutes:
Manager:
(Brazil) Otto Glória

GK	1	(Portugal) Carlos Gomes
DF		(Portugal) Manuel Caldeira
DF		(Portugal) João Galaz
DF		(Portugal) Joaquim Pacheco
DF		(Portugal) Manuel Passos
MF		(Portugal) Juca
FW		(Portugal) Albano (c)
FW		(Portugal) João Martins
FW		(Portugal) José Travassos
FW		(Belgian Congo) Leon Mokuna
FW		(Portugal) Hugo Sarmento
Substitutes:
Manager:
(Argentina) Alejandro Scopelli

1954–55 Taça de Portugal Winners
Benfica
8th Title

Match officials

- Assistant referees:
- Fourth official:

Match rules

- 90 minutes.

== See also ==
- Derby de Lisboa
