= Francisco Calado =

Portuguese footballer

Personal information
- Full name: Francisco Antero Perdigão Calado Ribeiro
- Date of birth: 22 February 1927
- Place of birth: Lisbon, Portugal
- Date of death: 5 February 2005 (aged 77)
- Place of death: Lisbon, Portugal
- Position: Half-back

Senior career*
Years	Team	Apps	(Gls)
1947–1948	Lisboa e Águias		
1948–1958	Benfica	81	(10)
Total		81	(10)
- * Club domestic league appearances and goals

Francisco Antero Perdigão Calado Ribeiro (22 February 1927 – 5 February 2005), known as Francisco Calado, was a former Portuguese footballer who played as a half-back.

Calado represented Benfica for ten seasons, winning four major titles. After football, he played for their rugby section until 1969.

== Career ==
Calado started his career in Clube Desportivo Lisboa e Águias, a small club in Lisbon. In 1948, the 21-year old fulfilled a life dream of playing for Benfica when Ted Smith selected him to start against Olhanense on 29 December. With serious competition from Francisco Ferreira, Félix Antunes, Francisco Moreira and others, his playing time was so restricted that he did not play competitively at all in 1949–50, 1951–52 and 1952–53.

His best seasons were in 1954–55 and 1955–56, when he assumed a starting role alongside Alfredo Abrantes and Fernando Caiado, playing 27 games in the first year and 15 in the second. He played his last game for Benfica on the 1958 Taça de Portugal Final lost to Porto. His commitment to Benfica was so great that he once said: "I will not leave Benfica. I will stay here without pay, and they can put me in the reserve team if they wish. If I have to, I will pay for my boots, but I only wear Benfica's shirt". After the end of his football career, he continued representing Benfica, playing 11 more years in the rugby section. He died on 5 February 2005, from a cerebral embolism.

== Honours ==
Benfica

- Primeira Liga: 1954–55, 1956–57, 1959–60
- Taça de Portugal: 1954–55, 1956–57
