= Calado =

Calado is a surname. Notable people with the surname include:

- Carlos Calado (born 1975), Portuguese athlete
- Francisco Calado (1927–2005), Portuguese footballer
- James Calado (born 1989), British racing driver
- Joaquim Antônio da Silva Calado (1848–1880), Brazilian composer and flautist
- Jorge Calado (born 1942), Mozambican-Portuguese footballer
- José Calado (born 1974), Portuguese footballer
