= 1951–52 Primeira Divisão =

18th season of top-tier Portuguese football

Primeira Liga
- Season: 1951–52
- Champions: Sporting CP; 7th title
- Relegated: Salgueiros; Oriental
- Matches played: 182
- Goals scored: 706 (3.88 per match)

Statistics of Portuguese Liga in the 1951–52 season.

== Overview ==
Location of teams in the 1951–52 Liga

It was contested by 14 teams, and Sporting Clube de Portugal won the championship.

== League standings ==
Pos	Team	Pld	W	D	L	GF	GA	GD	Pts	Qualification or relegation
1	Sporting CP (C)	26	19	3	4	91	32	+59	41	
2	Benfica	26	18	4	4	76	26	+50	40	
3	Porto	26	15	6	5	68	33	+35	36	
4	Belenenses	26	14	8	4	60	28	+32	36	
5	Boavista	26	12	1	13	47	55	−8	25	
6	Sporting da Covilhã	26	10	5	11	35	52	−17	25	
7	Académica	26	8	6	12	39	47	−8	22	
8	Braga	26	8	5	13	32	49	−17	21	
9	Estoril	26	8	5	13	49	61	−12	21	
10	Vitória de Guimarães	26	9	3	14	28	47	−19	21	
11	Barreirense	26	8	5	13	47	65	−18	21	
12	Atlético CP	26	7	6	13	53	48	+5	20	
13	Oriental (R)	26	8	2	16	48	72	−24	18	Relegation to Segunda Divisão
14	Salgueiros (R)	26	8	1	17	33	91	−58	17	Relegation to Segunda Divisão

Source: rsssf.org
(C) Champions; (R) Relegated

== Results ==
Home \ Away	ACA	ACP	BAR	BEL	BEN	BOA	BRA	EST	ORI	POR	SAL	SCP	SCO	VGU
Académica		1–0	2–3	2–1	0–3	5–1	1–1	4–0	2–0	1–1	8–1	3–3	1–3	0–0
Atlético CP	0–1		3–1	1–1	3–4	6–1	2–2	4–1	1–2	1–2	3–3	2–5	5–0	4–0
Barreirense	2–2	3–1		1–4	1–1	4–0	1–1	3–3	8–2	2–0	0–1	1–2	2–1	1–0
Belenenses	2–0	4–2	4–1		2–0	3–0	1–0	1–1	7–2	1–1	7–0	4–3	3–0	0–0
Benfica	4–0	1–0	7–1	0–0		2–0	5–0	1–1	5–2	2–0	9–0	2–3	4–1	1–0
Boavista	3–0	1–1	4–2	2–1	0–3		1–0	6–3	4–1	1–0	4–1	3–0	4–0	4–0
Braga	2–0	0–0	2–1	1–4	1–6	1–3		1–0	4–1	2–0	5–1	0–2	0–0	1–0
Estoril	5–3	2–1	1–1	2–3	1–1	5–1	3–2		3–2	1–2	2–0	1–2	3–0	4–0
Oriental	1–0	3–5	6–0	1–1	1–3	3–0	2–4	4–0		2–3	2–1	2–1	1–4	3–0
Porto	3–0	1–1	3–2	1–1	3–0	4–0	6–1	4–3	6–2		7–1	2–2	6–1	4–1
Salgueiros	1–2	1–5	1–5	2–1	2–7	2–1	3–1	1–0	4–1	1–4		0–3	3–1	2–1
Sporting CP	4–0	5–1	8–0	1–1	2–3	3–1	4–0	8–1	2–0	2–1	6–0		6–2	6–1
Sporting da Covilhã	0–0	2–1	4–1	4–2	0–1	2–1	1–0	4–2	0–0	0–0	2–0	0–6		3–0
Vitória de Guimarães	3–1	1–0	2–0	0–1	2–1	3–1	1–0	2–1	4–2	2–4	4–1	1–2	0–0	

Source: rsssf.org
Legend: Blue = home team win; Yellow = draw; Red = away team win.
