= Maurício Vieira de Brito =

Portuguese businessman (1919–1975)

- Born: 6 March 1919; Novo Redondo, Portugal
- Died: 9 August 1975 (aged 56); Lisbon, Portugal
- Occupation: Businessman
- Known for: Presidency of S.L. Benfica
- Spouse: Rita Angélica de Rollão Preto Santos Marques Vieira de Brito (m. 1944)
- Children: 3
- Parent(s): Mário da Cunha Brito; Zenóbia Ramos Vieira de Brito

Maurício Vieira de Brito (6 March 1919 – 9 August 1975) was a Portuguese businessman who served as the 21st president of Portuguese sports club S.L. Benfica.

Born in Novo Redondo, he served as president of Benfica between 30 March 1957 and 31 March 1962, succeeding Joaquim Ferreira Bogalho. Vieira de Brito was arguably the person who financed Benfica the most, during and after his term; with his own money, he made improvements to the original Estádio da Luz: illumination of the stadium, in 1958, and the first stage of the construction of the third tier, known as Terceiro Anel, in 1960. This year, he was awarded the Águia de Ouro (Golden Eagle) by the club.

Under Vieira de Brito's presidency, Benfica hired football coach Béla Guttmann in 1959 and footballer Eusébio in 1960. Consequently, the team won the European Cup in 1961 and 1962, with the former title being won under his tenure. In addition, Vieira de Brito won back-to-back league titles in 1959–60 and 1960–61. He was succeeded by António Cabral Fezas Vital in March 1962. Thirteen years later, Vieira de Brito died in Lisbon, aged 56.

Preceded by Joaquim Ferreira Bogalho	President of Benfica; 1957–1962	Succeeded by António Cabral Fezas Vital
