= Mário Coluna =

Portuguese footballer (1935–2014)

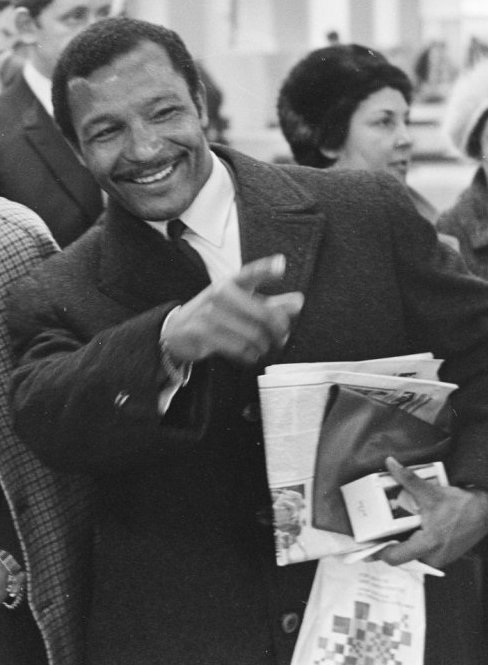
- Coluna in 1969

Personal information
- Full name: Mário Esteves Coluna
- Date of birth: 6 August 1935
- Place of birth: Inhaca, Portuguese Mozambique
- Date of death: 25 February 2014 (aged 78)
- Place of death: Maputo, Mozambique
- Height: 1.73 m (5 ft 8 in)
- Position: Midfielder

Youth career
- Albasini
- Ferroviário
- 1951–1954: Desportivo Lourenço Marques

Senior career*
Years	Team	Apps	(Gls)
1954–1970	Benfica	364	(89)
1970–1971	Lyon	19	(2)
1971–1972	Estrela Portalegre		
Total		383	(91)

International career
1955–1968	Portugal	57	(8)
Medal record
Men's football
Representing Portugal
FIFA World Cup
Third place	1966 England
- * Club domestic league appearances and goals

Mário Esteves Coluna (Portuguese pronunciation: [ˈmaɾiu kuˈlunɐ]; 6 August 1935 – 25 February 2014) was a Portuguese footballer who played mainly as a central midfielder.

He spent most of his career with Benfica, appearing in 525 official matches and scoring 127 goals over 16 professional seasons. Dubbed O Monstro Sagrado (The Sacred Monster), he won 19 major titles with his main club, including ten Primeira Liga and two European Cups.

Coluna represented Portugal at the 1966 World Cup and earned a total of 57 caps. He was considered one of the best midfielders of his generation, also being viewed as one of the most talented Portuguese players of all time.

== Club career ==
Born in Inhaca, Portuguese Mozambique to a Portuguese father and a Mozambican mother, Coluna was spotted by S.L. Benfica while playing for Desportivo de Lourenço Marques, where he excelled at basketball and track and field. Signed by the Lisbon club in 1954, he started out as an inside forward, scoring a career-best 14 goals in 26 games in his first season in Portugal and winning the first of his Primeira Liga championships; subsequently, he was successfully reconverted as a central or attacking midfielder by manager Otto Glória, where he put to good use his stamina and strength, adding to this an accurate and powerful long-distance shot and technical skills.

Coluna captained Benfica from 1963 to 1970, in 328 matches. Already at the service of Olympique Lyonnais, he was awarded a testimonial match by his main club on 8 December 1970, playing against a UEFA selection that featured the likes of Johan Cruyff, Dragan Džajić, Geoff Hurst, Bobby Moore, Uwe Seeler or Luis Suárez. He retired professionally aged 35 after one sole campaign with the French side, but spent one year with amateurs Sport Clube Estrela from Portalegre, acting as player-coach.

Coluna scored in both European Cup finals won by Benfica. In 1961, he beat FC Barcelona's Antoni Ramallets from long range in a 3–2 win in Bern. The following year, against fellow Spaniards Real Madrid, he netted the 3–3 equaliser and subsequently was supposed to take the penalty that resulted in the 4–3 lead (eventual 5–3 victory), when youngster Eusébio politely asked if he could shoot it instead.

== International career ==
Coluna played 57 times for the Portugal national team, scoring eight goals. His first appearance was in a friendly with Scotland on 4 May 1955 (3–0 loss), and his last was on 11 December 1968 in a 4–2 defeat to Greece for the 1970 FIFA World Cup qualifiers.

Coluna captained the Magriços in all except one of the matches during the third-place campaign at the 1966 World Cup in England.

== Style of play ==
Coluna was noted for his leadership skills, calm demeanor and respectful conduct, as well as his vision and reading of the game, passing range and powerful long shots.

== Post-retirement and death ==
After Mozambique became independent in 1975, Coluna held the post of President of its Football Federation. He also served as the country's Minister of Sports, from 1994 to 1999.

Coluna died on 25 February 2014 at the age of 78 in Maputo, after not being able to overcome a pulmonary infection.

== Honours ==
Benfica

- Primeira Liga: 1954–55, 1956–57, 1959–60, 1960–61, 1962–63, 1963–64, 1964–65, 1966–67, 1967–68, 1968–69
- Taça de Portugal: 1954–55, 1956–57, 1958–59, 1961–62, 1963–64, 1968–69
- European Cup: 1960–61, 1961–62
- Intercontinental Cup runner-up: 1961, 1962

Portugal

- FIFA World Cup third-place: 1966

Individual

- World Soccer World XI: 1963, 1964, 1965, 1966
- FIFA World Cup All-Star Team: 1966
- World XI: 1967
