= Torneio Internacional Charles Miller =

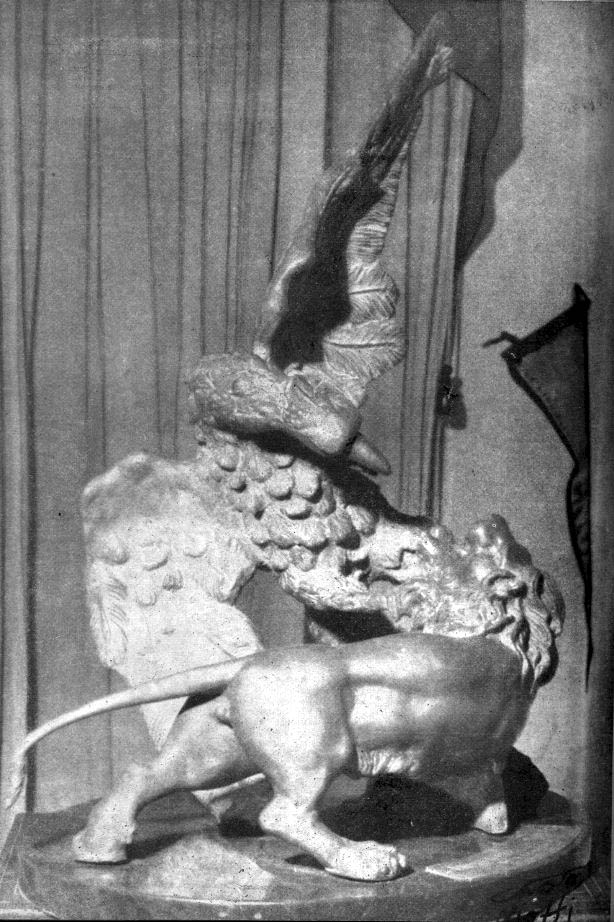
- The trophy awarded to champions
- Organiser(s): (Brazil) CBD
- Founded: 1955
- Abolished: 1955; 71 years ago
- Region: Rio de Janeiro; São Paulo
- Teams: 6
- Related competitions: Copa Rio; Torneio Rivadavia Correa
- Last champions: (Brazil) Corinthians

The Torneio Internacional Charles Miller (also named Taça Charles Miller) was an international football club tournament played by six teams in Rio de Janeiro and São Paulo, in June and July 1955. According to the newspapers O Estado de S. Paulo and Jornal do Brasil, the competition was sponsored and organized under the auspices of Brazilian Sports Confederation (CBD), including being managed by the entity's Technical Council.

The tournament was contested by teams from Brazil, Uruguay, and Portugal, and played under a single round-robin tournament format. Brazilian side Corinthians won the competition on points.

== History ==
On June 17, 1955, the newspaper O Jornal (RJ) reported that due to the cancellation of the unsuccessful Torneio Octogonal Rivadavia Correa Meyer that year, the CBD, which had already made commitments to play with Benfica and Peñarol, was left with a tournament without a name and decided to name it Charles William Miller on June 6 (according to the June 7 edition) in honor of the introducer of football in the country. Corinthians Paulista was the champion. After the victory, O Jornal (RJ) reported to the São Paulo press commenting on the outcome: "It is known that the technical management of Corinthians will not accept any more friendly matches in order to give their players a rest until the start of the Championship (the 1955 Paulistão)." Corinthians lists this achievement in the gallery of tournaments of a national character friendly.

=== Features ===
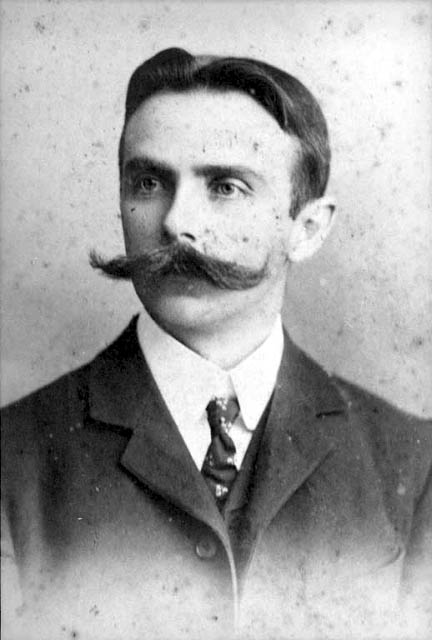
The cup was named after Charles William Miller, considered "the father of Brazilian football"

The 1955 Charles de Miller Trophy had aspects in common with better-known international competitions, such as the Copa Rio in 1951 and 1952, and the Rivadavia Corrêa Meyer Tournament in 1953: it was organized by the CBD and the tournament featured the champions of Rio de Janeiro, São Paulo and Uruguay from the previous year, as well as the Portuguese champion from the same year.

The 1955 tournament therefore featured 4 of the 5 champions who had participated in both editions of the Copa Rio (the other participant in common between the two editions of the Copa Rio in 1951 and 1952 was the Austrian club Austria Vienna). In 1955, the Uruguayan and Portuguese champions once again attended international events in Brazil, as they had done in 1951, 1952 and 1953. In 1953, the tournament organized by the CBD (Rivadavia Corrêa Meyer), named in honor of the president of the CBD, featured the Portuguese champion and only did not feature the Uruguayan champion from the previous year because the Uruguayan Football Association vetoed its participation in the tournament.

The newspaper O Estado de S. Paulo reported that the 1955 competition did not obtain a good result in terms of attendance and revenue. The representatives of the CBD were responsible for recruiting foreign teams.

The same newspaper also confirmed that the 1955 competition was initially planned as a sequel to the Rivadavia Correa Meyer Tournament. The July 24, 1953 edition confirmed that the CBD international tournament would not be played in 1954 because FIFA prohibited competitions from being played in parallel with the World Cup. (the Latin Cup and the Small Club World Cup were also not played in 1954, probably for the same reason).

The February 8, 1955 edition reported that the objective of the CBD was to hold a new edition of the Rivadavia Corrêa Meyer championship, stating that the presence of Peñarol, Benfica and Milan was guaranteed. The May 10, 1955 edition returned to talk about the 1955 Rivadavia Corrêa Meyer, commenting on negotiations with Fiorentina (Italy), Newcastle (winner of the 1954–55 FA Cup) and Chelsea (England)., the CBD had sent its representatives to invite foreign clubs to compete in the Rivadavia Corrêa Meyer, such was the difficulty that it was said that another competition would be held in its place, possibly only with South American clubs.

The May 26, 1955 edition confirmed the attempt to have Hungarian club Budapest Honvéd participating, and also informed the hiring of an English referee for the tournament. The same newspaper announced the participation of Benfica and Peñarol, and stateed that the CBD's failure in bringing foreign players to Brazil was such that the body would probably no longer organize international club competitions. The May 31, 1955 edition referred to the Tournament for the first time not as the "Taça Rivadavia Correa Meyer" but as the "Torneio Hexagonal", given that the CBD had only managed to bring 2 foreign teams to the tournament and so that time it would be a hexagonal one instead on an octagonal one. The June 11, 1955 edition calls the competition the Charles Miller Cup.

In 1956, the CBD organized, together with the AFA and the AUF, the Copa do Atlântico, featuring only South American teams and which had no champion because the final was not played.

== Teams ==
A total of six teams took part of the competition, with 4 from Brazil (Corinthians, America, Palmeiras, and Flamengo), one from Uruguay (Peñarol), and one from Portugal (Benfica).

== Tournament ==
=== Matches ===
19 June

Flamengo (Brazil)	2–1	(Portugal) Benfica
	Report

19 June

Peñarol (Uruguay)	2–2	(Brazil) Palmeiras
	Report

22 June

Corinthians (Brazil)	2–1	(Brazil) Palmeiras
	Report

22 June

America (Brazil)	1–0	(Brazil) Flamengo
	Report

26 June

Corinthians (Brazil)	3–0	(Brazil) Flamengo
	Report

26 June

Benfica (Portugal)	2–0	(Uruguay) Peñarol
	Report

29 June

Benfica (Portugal)	2–0	(Brazil) Palmeiras
	Report

29 June

America (Brazil)	4–1	(Uruguay) Peñarol
	Report

2 July

Flamengo (Brazil)	3–1	(Brazil) Palmeiras
	Report

3 July

America (Brazil)	4–2	(Portugal) Benfica
	Report

2 July

Corinthians (Brazil)	2–2	(Uruguay) Peñarol
	Report

2 July

Corinthians (Brazil)	2–2	(Uruguay) Peñarol
	Report

6 July

Corinthians (Brazil)	3–1	(Brazil) America
	Report

9 July

America (Brazil)	2–2	(Brazil) Palmeiras
	Report

10 July

Flamengo (Brazil)	2–1	(Uruguay) Peñarol
	Report

10 July

Corinthians (Brazil)	2–1	(Portugal) Benfica
	Report

=== Final table ===
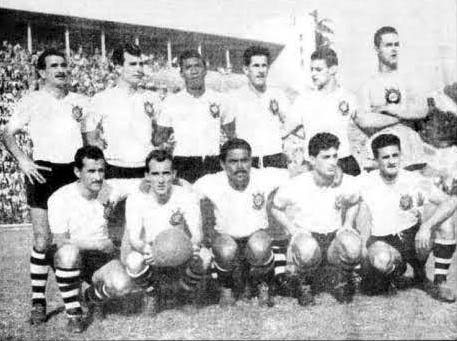
Corinthians, champions

Pos	Team	Pld	W	D	L	GF	GA	GD	Pts	Result
1	(Brazil) Corinthians	5	4	1	0	12	5	+7	9	Champion
2	(Brazil) America	5	3	1	1	12	7	+5	7	
3	(Brazil) Flamengo	5	3	0	2	8	8	0	6	
4	(Portugal) Benfica	5	2	0	3	7	8	−1	4	
5	(Brazil) Palmeiras	5	0	2	3	9	13	−4	2	
6	(Uruguay) Peñarol	5	0	2	3	6	12	−6	2	

Source: RSSSF
