= José Águas =

Portuguese-angolan footballer (1930–2000)

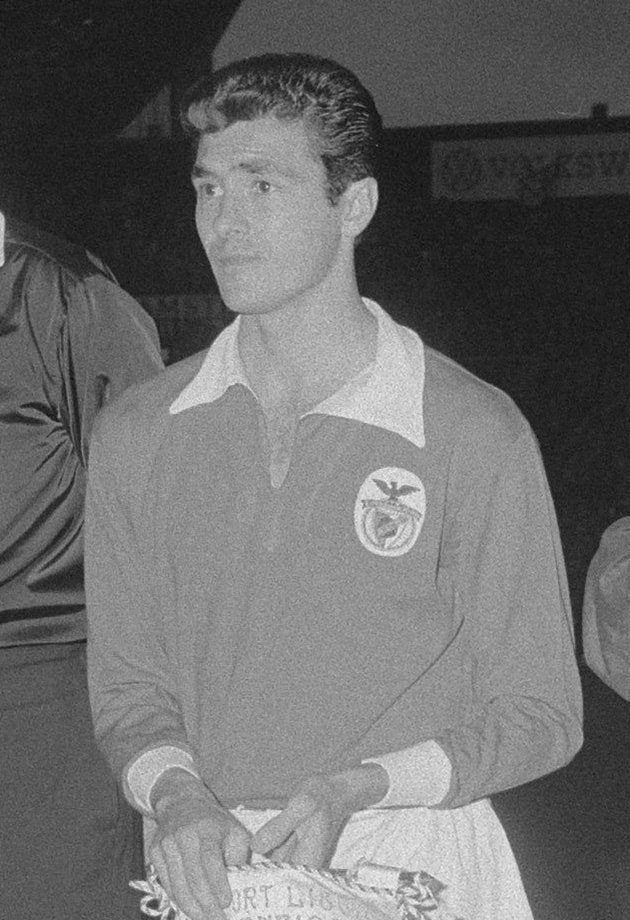
- Águas with Benfica in 1962

Personal information
- Full name: José Pinto Carvalho Santos Águas
- Date of birth: 9 November 1930
- Place of birth: Luanda, Angola
- Date of death: 10 December 2000 (aged 70)
- Place of death: Lisbon, Portugal
- Height: 1.81 m (5 ft 11 in)
- Position: Striker

Youth career
- 1944–1948: Lusitano Lobito

Senior career*
Years	Team	Apps	(Gls)
1948–1950	Lusitano Lobito		
1950–1963	Benfica	281	(290)
1963–1964	Austria Vienna	7	(2)
Total		288	(292)

International career
1952–1962	Portugal	25	(11)

Managerial career
- 1966–1967: Marítimo
- 1967–1968: Atlético
- 1968–1969: Leixões
- * Club domestic league appearances and goals

José Pinto de Carvalho Santos Águas (Portuguese pronunciation: [ʒuˈzɛ ˈaɣwɐʃ]; 9 November 1930 – 10 December 2000) was a Portuguese footballer who played as a striker.

He enjoyed a lengthy professional spell with Benfica, never scoring less than 18 goals in 12 of his 13 first division seasons. A prolific goalscorer, Águas was nicknamed "Cabeça de Ouro" ("Golden Head") because of his header skills.

== Club career ==
Born in Luanda, Portuguese Angola, Portuguese Empire from a Portuguese colonial family, Águas started his footballing career with local team Lusitano do Lobito, before moving to S.L. Benfica in 1950 where he gained legendary status.

With Benfica he won the Primeira Liga five times (1955, 1957, 1960, 1961 and 1963) and the domestic cup seven, also being crowned national league's top scorer on five occasions. In the years previous to Eusébio's rise, he was also instrumental in the club's back-to-back European Cup conquests, in 1961 against FC Barcelona (3–2), and the next season against Real Madrid (5–3), scoring his team's first goal on both occasions and being club captain; he failed to complete a hat-trick of wins in the competition after the 1–2 defeat to A.C. Milan in the 1963 final (he did not play).

After leaving Benfica, Águas, aged 33, played one more season for FK Austria Wien, retiring the next summer. He died in Lisbon, at the age of 70 after a prolonged illness.

== International career ==
Águas made his debut for Portugal on 23 November 1952, in a 1–1 draw with Austria, and went on to gain a total of 25 caps while scoring 11 times. His last appearance was on 17 May 1962, a 2–1 defeat against Belgium.

== Personal life ==
Águas' son, Rui, was also a footballer and a striker. He too represented Benfica and the national team, as well as FC Porto.

His daughter, Helena Maria, known as Lena d'Água, has a career in pop music as a singer.

== Career statistics ==
=== Club ===
Appearances and goals by club, season and competition
Club	Season	League			National cup		Continental		Total	
Club	Season	Division	Apps	Goals	Apps	Goals	Apps	Goals	Apps	Goals
Benfica	1950–51	Primeira Divisão	19	23	7	6	–		26	29
Benfica	1951–52	Primeira Divisão	22	28	7	6	–		29	34
Benfica	1952–53	Primeira Divisão	25	25	7	10	–		32	35
Benfica	1953–54	Primeira Divisão	18	24	2	0	–		20	24
Benfica	1954–55	Primeira Divisão	26	20	6	6	–		32	26
Benfica	1955–56	Primeira Divisão	26	28	2	2	–		28	30
Benfica	1956–57	Primeira Divisão	25	30	7	3	–		32	33
Benfica	1957–58	Primeira Divisão	22	22	8	9	2	0	32	31
Benfica	1958–59	Primeira Divisão	24	26	8	3	–		32	29
Benfica	1959–60	Primeira Divisão	25	18	9	12	–		34	30
Benfica	1960–61	Primeira Divisão	23	27	1	5	9	11	33	43
Benfica	1961–62	Primeira Divisão	22	18	5	2	9	6	36	26
Benfica	1962–63	Primeira Divisão	4	2	6	5	3	1	13	8
Benfica	Total		281	291	75	70	21	18	377	379
Austria Wien	1963–64	Austrian Staatsliga	7	2	0	0	1	0	8	2
Career total			288	293	75	70	22	18	385	381

=== International ===
Scores and results list Portugal's goal tally first, score column indicates score after each Águas goal.

List of international goals scored by José Águas
No.	Date	Venue	Opponent	Score	Result	Competition
1	27 September 1953	Ernst-Happel-Stadion, Wien, Austria	Austria	1–5	1–9	1954 FIFA World Cup qualification
2	22 November 1953	Estádio do Jamor, Lisbon, Portugal	South Africa	2–0	3–1	Friendly
3	22 May 1955	Estádio das Antas, Porto, Portugal	England	1–1	3–1	Friendly
4	22 May 1955	Estádio das Antas, Porto, Portugal	England	3–1	3–1	Friendly
5	20 November 1955	Estádio do Jamor, Lisbon, Portugal	Sweden	1–1	2–6	Friendly
6	20 November 1955	Estádio do Jamor, Lisbon, Portugal	Sweden	2–4	2–6	Friendly
7	23 December 1955	Muhammad Ali Stadium, Cairo, Egypt	Egypt	1–0	4–0	Friendly
8	23 December 1955	Muhammad Ali Stadium, Cairo, Egypt	Egypt	4–0	4–0	Friendly
9	9 June 1956	Estádio do Jamor, Lisbon, Portugal	Hungary	1–0	2–2	Friendly
10	19 March 1961	Estádio do Jamor, Lisbon, Portugal	Luxembourg	1–0	6–0	1962 FIFA World Cup qualification
11	21 May 1961	Estádio do Jamor, Lisbon, Portugal	England	1–0	1–1	1962 FIFA World Cup qualification

== Honours ==
=== Player ===
Benfica

- Primeira Liga: 1954–55, 1956–57, 1959–60, 1960–61, 1962–63
- Taça de Portugal: 1950–51, 1951–52, 1952–53, 1954–55, 1956–57, 1958–59, 1961–62
- European Cup: 1960–61, 1961–62

=== Manager ===
Marítimo

- AF Madeira Championship: 1966–67
- Madeira Cup: 1966–67

Atlético

- Segunda Divisão: 1967–68

=== Individual ===
- Primeira Liga top scorer: 1951–52, 1955–56, 1956–57, 1958–59, 1960–61
- European Cup top scorer: 1960–61
- Taça de Portugal top scorer: 1950–51, 1952–53, 1954–55, 1957–58

== See also ==
- List of association football families
