= Zézinho (footballer, born March 1930) =

Portuguese footballer

Personal information
- Full name: José Gouveia Martins
- Date of birth: 6 March 1930
- Place of birth: Montijo, Portugal
- Date of death: 30 August 2015 (aged 85)
- Place of death: Montijo, Portugal
- Position: Half-back

Senior career*
Years	Team	Apps	(Gls)
1948–1952	Montijo		
1952–1960	Benfica	50	(9)
1960–1965	Montijo		
Total		50	(9)
- * Club domestic league appearances and goals

José Gouveia Martins (6 March 1930 – 30 August 2015), better known as Zézinho, was a Portuguese footballer who played as a half-back.

Having played only for two clubs, Montijo and Benfica, Zezinho spent nine years in the first and eight in the second. At Benfica he won three Primeira Liga and four Taça de Portugal.

== Career ==
Born in Montijo, Portugal, Zézinho started his career at his home-town club, C.D. Montijo at age 18. After four years there, he moved to the much larger Benfica, making his debut for them on 2 November 1952, against Porto. He played 19 games in all competitions in his first year, winning the Taça de Portugal.

Never an undisputed starter, his official appearances rarely reached double digits, with 1957–58 being a notable exception. Otto Glória used him in 17 games, but Benfica did not win any silverware. He left the club in 1960, playing his last game on 20 March, against Académica. In his eight seasons at Benfica, he won three league titles and four Portuguese Cups. After Benfica, he returned to Montijo, where he played another five seasons. He died on 30 August 2015, at age 85.

== Honours ==
Benfica

- Primeira Liga: 1954–55, 1956–57, 1959–60
- Taça de Portugal: 1952–53, 1954–55, 1956–57, 1958–59
