= Ângelo Martins =

Portuguese footballer (1930–2020)

Personal information
- Full name: Ângelo Gaspar Martins
- Date of birth: 19 April 1930
- Place of birth: Porto, Portugal
- Date of death: 11 October 2020 (aged 90)
- Place of death: Lisbon, Portugal
- Height: 1.75 m (5 ft 9 in)
- Positions: Left back; right back

Youth career
- 1945–1948: Académico do Porto

Senior career*
Years	Team	Apps	(Gls)
1951–1952	Benfica (reserves)		
1952–1965	Benfica	231	(3)

International career
1953–1962	Portugal	20	(0)

Managerial career
- Benfica (youth)
- * Club domestic league appearances and goals

Ângelo Gaspar Martins (19 April 1930 – 11 October 2020), simply known as Ângelo, was a Portuguese footballer who played as a defender for Benfica and the Portugal national team.

== Club career ==
Born in Porto on 19 April 1930, Ângelo turned down an opportunity to play football for FC Porto because he was a supporter of rivals Benfica, from Lisbon, and hometown club Salgueiros.

In 1945, aged 15, Ângelo started his career playing as a left defender for Académico do Porto, where he spent three years until he was scammed by an FC Porto staff member, who gave him a false document and made him sign for the club while he still was an Académico do Porto player. As a result, the Portuguese Football Federation (FPF) banned Ângelo from football, although the punishment would only last for a few months.

Three years later, when Ângelo was a worker at his father's shoe store and was serving in the military in Santarém at age 20, a Benfica scout watched him play and brought him to Lisbon in 1951 to represent Benfica's reserves, with the FPF backing down on his ban. During his 13 seasons with The Eagles' main team, from 1952 to 1965, he made 285 appearances and scored 4 goals, winning 7 Primeira Liga titles, 5 Taça de Portugal, 1 Taça de Honra, and 2 consecutive European Cups (in 1961 and 1962). He retired as a player at age 35.

== International career ==
Ângelo played for Portugal on 20 occasions. He made his debut in 1953 against Austria at the Prater Stadium and played his final match for the country in 1962 against Bulgaria at the Estádio do Restelo.

== Death ==
Ângelo died of natural causes at 90 years old, on 11 October 2020, in the company of his family.

== Honours ==
=== Player ===
Benfica

- Primeira Liga: 1954–55, 1956–57, 1959–60, 1960–61, 1962–63, 1963–64, 1964–65
- Taça de Portugal: 1952–53, 1954–55, 1956–57, 1961–62, 1963–64
- Taça de Honra: 1962–63
- European Cup: 1960–61, 1961–62
- Intercontinental Cup runner-up: 1961, 1962

=== Manager ===
Benfica

- Campeonato Nacional de Juniores (7)
- Campeonato Nacional de Juvenis (6)
- Campeonato Nacional de Iniciados (2)

== See also ==
- List of one-club men
