= Arsénio Duarte =

Portuguese footballer

Arsénio
Personal information
- Full name: Arsénio Trindade Duarte
- Date of birth: 16 October 1925
- Place of birth: Barreiro, Portugal
- Date of death: 11 February 1986 (aged 60)
- Height: 1.71 m (5 ft 7 in)
- Position: Forward

Youth career
- Barreirense

Senior career*
Years	Team	Apps	(Gls)
1942–1943	Barreirense		
1943–1955	Benfica	224	(152)
1955–1959	CUF	89	(59)
1959–1960	Montijo		
1960–1962	Cova da Piedade		
1962–1963	Monte da Caparica		

International career
1950	Portugal	2	(0)
- * Club domestic league appearances and goals

Arsénio Trindade Duarte (16 October 1925 – 11 February 1986), simply known as Arsénio, was a Portuguese footballer who played as a forward.

He amassed Primeira Liga totals of 313 games and 211 goals during 16 seasons, most notably at Benfica.

== Club career ==
Born in Barreiro, Setúbal District, Arsénio started his career at local F.C. Barreirense, first appearing with the senior team at only 15 against Sporting Clube de Portugal, in a testimonial match for Francisco Câmara. After helping the side win the Segunda Liga championship in 1943, he signed with S.L. Benfica.

During his spell with Benfica, Arsénio scored 360 in 446 competitive games, including a hat-trick in a 7–2 home win over Sporting in 1946, and five against FC Porto six years later in the inauguration of the Estádio das Antas. He helped to the conquest of ten major titles, including three Primeira Liga trophies.

Arsénio left for G.D. CUF in 1955 after the arrival of manager Otto Glória, as the Brazilian had been hired to hasten the club's professionalization and the player wanted to keep his post as an industrial worker. He was crowned the top division's top scorer in his third season, helping his team narrowly avoid relegation after ranking 12th.

== International career ==
Arsénio gained two caps for Portugal in seven days. His debut came on 2 April 1950, in a 1–5 away loss to Spain for the 1950 FIFA World Cup qualifiers.

== Honours ==
=== Club ===
Benfica

- Primeira Divisão (3): 1942–43, 1944–45, 1949–50
- Taça de Portugal (6): 1942–43, 1943–44, 1948–49, 1950–51, 1951–52, 1952–53
- Latin Cup: 1950

=== Individual ===
- Bola de Prata: 1957–58
