= 1955–56 Primeira Divisão =

22nd season of top-tier Portuguese football

Primeira Liga
- Season: 1955–56
- Champions: FC Porto; 4th title
- Relegated: S.C. Braga
- European Cup: FC Porto
- Matches played: 182
- Goals scored: 674 (3.7 per match)

Statistics of Portuguese Liga in the 1955/1956 season.

== Overview ==
Location of teams in the 1955–56 Liga

It was contested by 14 teams, and F.C. Porto won the championship.

== League standings ==
Pos	Team	Pld	W	D	L	GF	GA	GD	Pts	Qualification or relegation
1	Porto (C)	26	18	7	1	77	20	+57	43	Qualification to European Cup preliminary round
2	Benfica	26	19	5	2	76	31	+45	43	
3	Belenenses	26	16	5	5	67	25	+42	37	
4	Sporting CP	26	15	6	5	54	27	+27	36	
5	Sporting da Covilhã	26	11	7	8	52	44	+8	29	
6	Barreirense	26	8	7	11	40	60	−20	23	
7	Torreense	26	7	8	11	32	42	−10	22	
8	Lusitano de Évora	26	6	9	11	38	55	−17	21	
9	Vitória de Setúbal	26	7	6	13	57	64	−7	20	
10	CUF Barreiro	26	6	8	12	33	58	−25	20	
11	Caldas	26	6	7	13	29	50	−21	19	
12	Atlético CP	26	6	7	13	47	62	−15	19	
13	Académica	26	8	3	15	36	52	−16	19	
14	Braga (R)	26	5	3	18	36	84	−48	13	Relegation to Segunda Divisão

Source: rsssf.org
(C) Champions; (R) Relegated

== Results ==
Home \ Away	ACA	ACP	BAR	BEL	BEN	BRA	CAL	CUF	LUS	POR	SCP	SCO	SCT	VSE
Académica		2–1	3–1	0–5	1–0	4–1	2–2	3–4	1–2	1–2	1–1	1–0	4–1	2–1
Atlético CP	4–2		3–2	1–1	1–4	4–0	1–1	7–2	3–3	2–2	0–2	3–2	0–0	3–1
Barreirense	3–1	3–2		1–0	2–4	7–0	1–1	1–1	2–1	1–4	2–3	1–1	1–1	1–0
Belenenses	3–1	5–2	3–0		2–2	7–2	3–1	3–0	5–0	0–1	2–1	4–1	5–1	3–3
Benfica	4–0	3–0	4–1	1–0		7–1	3–0	3–2	1–1	1–1	3–0	2–2	2–2	5–1
Braga	1–3	2–1	1–1	1–4	2–3		4–1	4–1	0–2	1–5	2–3	0–2	1–0	4–2
Caldas	2–1	1–0	0–1	0–2	0–1	0–0		3–0	3–1	3–3	0–2	2–0	2–2	3–1
CUF Barreiro	1–0	2–1	1–1	1–2	1–5	2–2	1–1		2–2	0–4	0–0	1–1	3–1	3–2
Lusitano Évora	1–1	1–1	1–1	0–2	0–1	4–3	7–3	1–1		0–3	1–1	4–0	2–1	2–2
Porto	3–0	2–0	10–1	1–1	3–0	4–0	5–0	3–1	4–1		3–1	5–1	2–0	4–1
Sporting CP	2–1	5–2	7–1	1–0	1–3	4–2	2–0	3–0	6–0	1–0		3–0	0–1	2–0
Sporting da Covilhã	3–0	2–2	4–0	2–0	2–4	4–1	3–0	2–1	1–0	2–2	1–1		2–1	7–1
Torreense	2–0	3–1	2–1	1–1	2–5	3–0	1–0	1–2	2–0	0–0	0–0	2–4		1–1
Vitória de Setúbal	2–1	9–2	2–3	0–4	3–5	6–1	3–0	2–0	5–1	1–1	2–2	3–3	3–1	

Source: rsssf.org
Legend: Blue = home team win; Yellow = draw; Red = away team win.
