= Joaquim Ferreira Bogalho =

Portuguese businessman (1889–1977)

- Born: 11 December 1889; Alcobaça, Portugal
- Died: 1 October 1977 (aged 87)
- Other names: "O homem do estádio" (the man of the stadium)
- Known for: Presidency of S.L. Benfica

Joaquim Ferreira Bogalho (11 December 1889 – 1 October 1977), also known as "the man of the stadium" (o homem do estádio), was the 20th president of Portuguese sports club S.L. Benfica.

Bogalho was born in Alcobaça in 1889. After being awarded the Águia de Ouro (Golden Eagle) by Benfica on 31 July 1938, he was elected president of the club on 15 March 1952, a position he held until 30 March 1957, being reelected four times. He is considered the main responsible for the modernisation and professionalisation of the football team in 1954 with the signing of coach Otto Glória, and the construction of the original Estádio da Luz and the Centro de Estágio (Training Center), also known as Lar do Jogador (Player's Home). During his five-year presidency, Benfica won the Primeira Liga and Taça de Portugal in the same season twice, and more than doubled the number of club members (sócios).

Bogalho died on 1 October 1977.

Preceded by Mário Lampreia de Gusmão Madeira	President of Benfica; 1952–1957	Succeeded by Maurício Vieira de Brito
