= Mário João =

Portuguese footballer

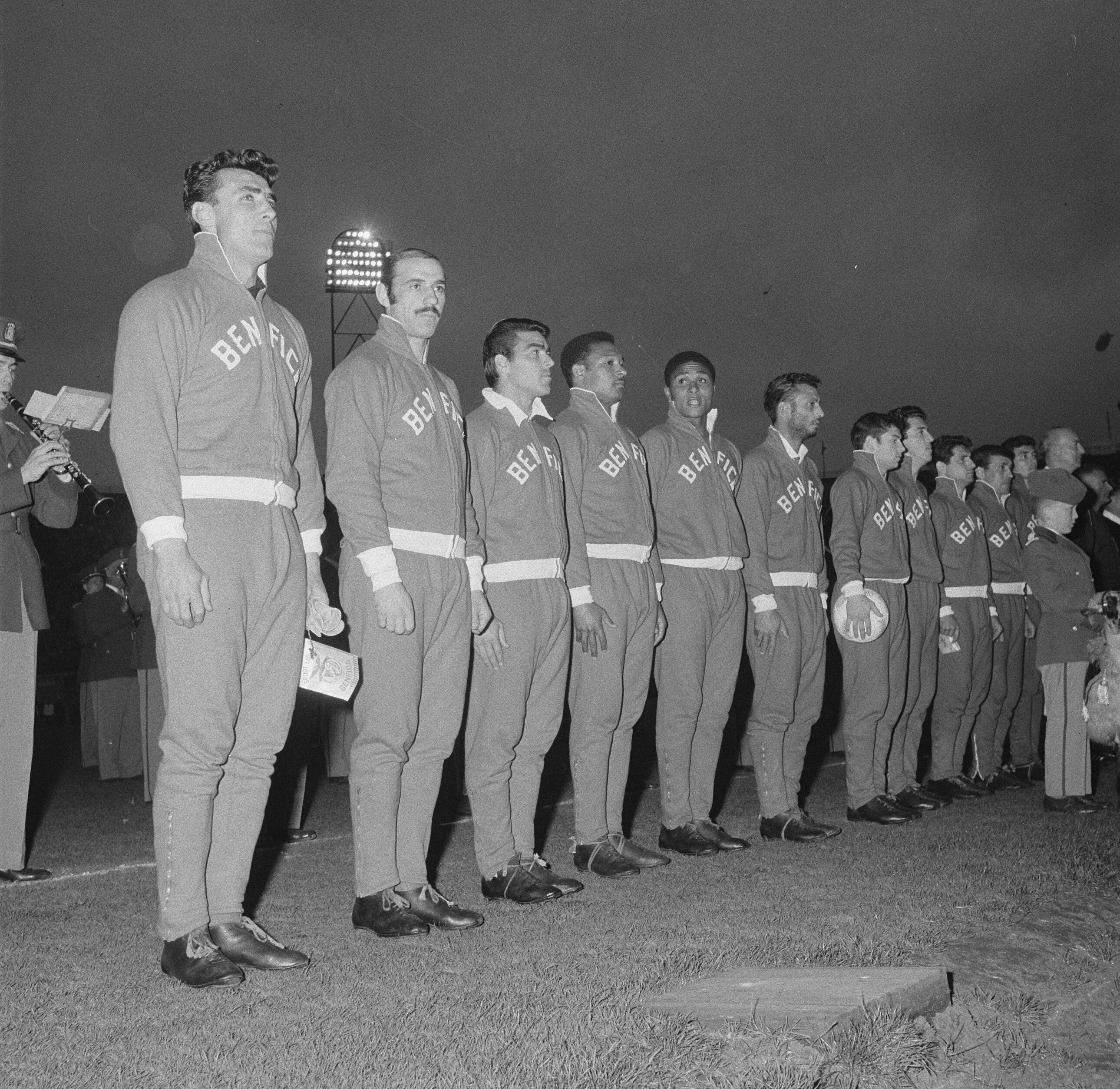
- Mário João (third from left) lining up before the 1962 European Cup final

Personal information
- Full name: Mário João Sousa Alves
- Date of birth: 6 June 1935 (age 91)
- Place of birth: Barreiro, Portugal
- Height: 1.69 m (5 ft 7 in)
- Position: Full-back

Youth career
- 1950–1954: CUF

Senior career*
Years	Team	Apps	(Gls)
1954–1955	CUF		
1955–1962	Benfica	48	(2)
1962–1968	CUF	118	(9)
Total		166	(11)

International career
1960–1964	Portugal	3	(0)

Managerial career
- 1975–1976: CUF
- * Club domestic league appearances and goals

Mário João Sousa Alves (born 6 June 1935), known as Mário João, is a Portuguese former footballer who played as a right or left-back.

He appeared in 166 Primeira Liga matches in ten seasons, scoring 11 goals.

== Club career ==
Born in Barreiro, Setúbal District, Mário João started and finished his 14-year senior career with G.D. CUF, beginning as a forward. In between, he spent seven years with S.L. Benfica in the Primeira Liga, appearing in 89 competitive matches and winning six major titles, including both of the European Cup finals in the early 60s, against FC Barcelona and Real Madrid.

Mário João retired in 1968, aged 33. He was never a full-time professional footballer, earning the vast majority of his wages from the Companhia União Fabril.

== International career ==
Mário João won three caps for Portugal in four years. His first arrived on 22 May 1960, in a 5–1 away defeat to Yugoslavia for the 1960 European Nations' Cup qualifiers.

== Honours ==
Benfica

- Primeira Liga: 1959–60, 1960–61
- Taça de Portugal: 1958–59, 1961–62
- European Cup: 1960–61, 1961–62
