= Francisco Palmeiro =

Portuguese footballer (1932–2017)

Personal information
- Full name: Francisco Luís Palmeiro Rodrigues
- Date of birth: 16 October 1932
- Place of birth: Arronches, Portugal
- Date of death: 22 January 2017 (aged 84)
- Place of death: Portugal
- Height: 1.73 m (5 ft 8 in)
- Position: Forward

Youth career
- 1948–1949: Arronches
- 1949–1951: O Elvas

Senior career*
Years	Team	Apps	(Gls)
1951–1953	Portalegrense		
1953–1961	Benfica	87	(31)
1961–1963	Atlético	48	(10)
1963–1965	Almada		
1965–1966	Pescadores		
1966–1967	Monte Caparica		

International career
1956–1957	Portugal	3	(3)
- * Club domestic league appearances and goals

Francisco Luís Palmeiro Rodrigues (16 October 1932 – 22 January 2017), known as Palmeiro, was a Portuguese footballer who played as a forward.

== Club career ==
Palmeiro was born in Arronches, Portalegre District. For eight years of his senior career he played with Primeira Liga side S.L. Benfica, leaving in 1961 after the emergence of Eusébio. Over the course of nine seasons, he amassed competition totals of 135 games and 41 goals – he also represented Atlético Clube de Portugal in the top division – and won three national championships and as many Taça de Portugal trophies with his main club.

Palmeiro was the first player to score a goal at the original Estádio da Luz, and was also the first Benfica player to do so in the European Cup, in a match against Sevilla FC in the 1957–58 campaign.

== International career ==
On 3 June 1956, Palmeiro earned the first of three caps for Portugal, in a friendly with Spain. He scored all of his team's goals in a 3–1 win in Lisbon.

== Death ==
Palmeiro died on 22 January 2017, aged 84.

== Honours ==
Benfica

- Primeira Liga: 1954–55, 1956–57, 1959–60
- Taça de Portugal: 1954–55, 1956–57, 1958–59
