= Fernando Caiado =

Portuguese footballer and manager

Personal information
- Full name: Fernando Augusto do Amaral Caiado
- Date of birth: 2 March 1925
- Place of birth: Leça da Palmeira, Portugal
- Date of death: 12 November 2006 (aged 81)
- Height: 1.73 m (5 ft 8 in)
- Position: Midfielder

Senior career*
Years	Team	Apps	(Gls)
1942–1952	Boavista	163	(63)
1952–1959	Benfica	141	(22)
Total		304	(85)

International career
1946–1956	Portugal	16	(0)

Managerial career
- 1962: Benfica (caretaker)
- 1966–1967: Braga
- 1967–1969: Sporting CP
- 1969–1970: Vitória de Guimarães
- 1975–1977: Vitória de Guimarães
- 1977: Boavista
- 1978–1979: Braga
- * Club domestic league appearances and goals

Fernando Augusto do Amaral Caiado (2 March 1925 – 12 November 2006) was a Portuguese footballer and manager, who played for Boavista and Benfica as midfielder.

== Playing honours ==
Benfica

- Primeira Divisão: 1954–55, 1956–57
- Taça de Portugal: 1952–53, 1954–55, 1956–57

== International career ==
Caiado gained 16 caps for the Portugal national team. He made his debut 16 June 1946 in Lisbon, in a 3–1 win against Republic of Ireland.
