= Alfredo Abrantes =

Portuguese footballer

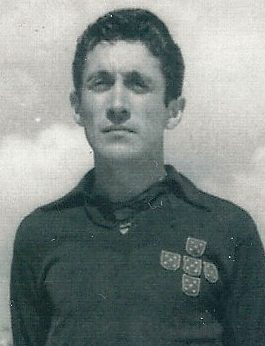
- Abrantes in 1959

Personal information
- Full name: Alfredo Saul Abrantes Abreu
- Date of birth: 19 April 1929
- Place of birth: Lisbon, Portugal
- Date of death: 16 April 2005 (aged 75)
- Position: Midfielder

Senior career*
Years	Team	Apps	(Gls)
1953–1954	Oriental		
1954–1960	Benfica	140	(1)
1960–1962	Belenenses		

International career
1959	Portugal	1	(0)
- * Club domestic league appearances and goals

Alfredo Saul Abrantes Abreu (19 April 1929 – 16 April 2005) was a Portuguese footballer who played as a midfielder, notably for S.L. Benfica.
