= 1954–55 Primeira Divisão =

21st season of top-tier Portuguese football

Primeira Liga
- Season: 1954–55
- Champions: Benfica; 8th title
- Relegated: Vitória de Guimarães; Boavista
- European Cup: Sporting CP
- Matches played: 182
- Goals scored: 640 (3.52 per match)

The 1954–55 Primeira Divisão was the 21st season of top-tier football in Portugal.

== Overview ==
Location of teams in the 1954–55 Liga

It was contested by 14 teams, and S.L. Benfica won the championship.

== League standings ==
Pos	Team	Pld	W	D	L	GF	GA	GD	Pts	Qualification or relegation
1	Benfica (C)	26	18	3	5	61	20	+41	39	
2	Belenenses	26	17	5	4	63	28	+35	39	
3	Sporting CP	26	15	7	4	73	27	+46	37	Qualification for the European Cup first round
4	Porto	26	12	6	8	51	34	+17	30	
5	Braga	26	12	5	9	52	42	+10	29	
6	Académica	26	10	5	11	53	52	+1	25	
7	CUF Barreiro	26	10	5	11	45	52	−7	25	
8	Vitória de Setúbal	26	8	6	12	37	52	−15	22	
9	Atlético CP	26	9	4	13	42	52	−10	22	
10	Lusitano	26	9	3	14	40	70	−30	21	
11	Barreirense	26	7	6	13	25	38	−13	20	
12	Sporting da Covilhã	26	8	4	14	32	53	−21	20	
13	Boavista (R)	26	7	4	15	33	71	−38	18	Relegation to Segunda Divisão
14	Vitória de Guimarães (R)	26	5	7	14	33	49	−16	17	Relegation to Segunda Divisão

Source: rsssf.com
(C) Champions; (R) Relegated

== Results ==
Home \ Away	ACA	ACP	BAR	BEL	BEN	BOA	BRA	CUF	LUS	POR	SCP	SCO	VGU	VSE
Académica		1–2	1–0	2–2	3–7	1–0	4–1	5–1	7–4	1–3	1–1	5–1	3–0	3–1
Atlético CP	1–2		1–0	2–2	1–2	8–3	2–1	1–0	3–2	2–0	0–1	0–1	2–1	1–1
Barreirense	2–1	2–0		1–0	3–0	1–0	1–3	1–2	2–2	1–3	0–0	2–2	1–0	3–1
Belenenses	6–2	5–2	3–0		1–2	6–0	2–3	4–1	2–0	1–0	2–2	4–0	3–0	1–2
Benfica	3–1	3–0	2–0	0–0		11–0	0–1	1–1	7–1	1–0	1–1	2–1	4–0	5–0
Boavista	3–1	3–0	2–1	1–1	0–3		2–1	2–2	4–1	5–2	1–2	2–1	2–2	1–1
Braga	4–1	4–2	4–0	2–3	0–1	1–0		2–2	4–0	1–2	2–2	2–1	3–1	5–0
CUF Barreiro	1–1	4–1	2–1	2–4	0–1	5–1	1–1		3–1	0–2	0–3	3–0	4–3	2–1
Lusitano Évora	1–1	4–3	3–0	1–2	0–2	2–1	4–1	0–3		2–1	2–1	3–0	2–1	2–0
Porto	2–1	3–3	2–0	0–1	3–0	5–0	1–1	3–2	9–0		1–1	2–0	1–1	0–2
Sporting CP	0–1	5–2	1–0	1–2	0–1	5–0	5–2	6–0	9–1	5–1		4–0	2–0	7–2
Sporting da Covilhã	3–2	1–3	1–1	1–2	0–1	2–0	0–1	3–1	3–2	2–2	2–2		2–1	2–0
Vitória de Guimarães	2–1	0–0	1–1	1–3	2–1	2–0	1–1	1–2	1–0	1–1	1–2	2–3		6–3
Vitória de Setúbal	1–1	1–0	1–1	0–1	1–0	4–0	4–1	3–1	0–0	0–2	2–5	4–0	2–2	

Legend: Blue = home team win; Yellow = draw; Red = away team win.
