= 1956–57 Primeira Divisão =

23rd season of top-tier Portuguese football

Primeira Liga
- Season: 1956–57
- Champions: Benfica; 9th title
- Relegated: Covilhã; Atlético
- European Cup: Benfica
- Matches played: 182
- Goals scored: 681 (3.74 per match)

The 1956–57 Primeira Divisão was the 23rd season of top-tier football in Portugal.

== Overview ==
Location of teams in the 1956–57 Liga

It was contested by 14 teams, and S.L. Benfica won the championship.

== League standings ==
| Pos | Team | Pld | W | D | L | GF | GA | GD | Pts | Qualification or relegation |
|---|---|---|---|---|---|---|---|---|---|---|
| 1 | Benfica (C) | 26 | 17 | 7 | 2 | 75 | 25 | +50 | 41 | Qualification to European Cup preliminary round |
| 2 | Porto | 26 | 18 | 4 | 4 | 86 | 23 | +63 | 40 | |
| 3 | Belenenses | 26 | 13 | 7 | 6 | 74 | 50 | +24 | 33 | |
| 4 | Sporting CP | 26 | 12 | 7 | 7 | 62 | 28 | +34 | 31 | |
| 5 | Lusitano de Évora | 26 | 13 | 4 | 9 | 57 | 51 | +6 | 30 | |
| 6 | Académica | 26 | 12 | 4 | 10 | 45 | 33 | +12 | 28 | |
| 7 | Torreense | 26 | 10 | 4 | 12 | 44 | 50 | −6 | 24 | |
| 8 | Oriental | 26 | 8 | 7 | 11 | 27 | 44 | −17 | 23 | |
| 9 | CUF Barreiro | 26 | 9 | 3 | 14 | 35 | 69 | −34 | 21 | |
| 10 | Vitória de Setúbal | 26 | 8 | 4 | 14 | 40 | 59 | −19 | 20 | |
| 11 | Barreirense | 26 | 8 | 4 | 14 | 39 | 62 | −23 | 20 | |
| 12 | Caldas | 26 | 6 | 7 | 13 | 32 | 63 | −31 | 19 | |
| 13 | Sporting da Covilhã (R) | 26 | 7 | 4 | 15 | 33 | 62 | −29 | 18 | Relegation to Segunda Divisão |
| 14 | Atlético CP (R) | 26 | 6 | 4 | 16 | 32 | 62 | −30 | 16 | Relegation to Segunda Divisão |

Source: rsssf.com
(C) Champions; (R) Relegated

== Results ==
| Home \ Away | ACA | ACP | BAR | BEL | BEN | CAL | CUF | LUS | ORI | POR | SCP | SCO | SCT | VSE |
|---|---|---|---|---|---|---|---|---|---|---|---|---|---|---|
| Académica | | 2–0 | 2–2 | 1–1 | 0–0 | 4–0 | 8–1 | 2–0 | 2–1 | 0–3 | 2–0 | 0–0 | 4–0 | 2–0 |
| Atlético CP | 1–0 | | 2–2 | 2–4 | 0–5 | 2–2 | 4–1 | 3–7 | 0–1 | 1–3 | 1–3 | 3–1 | 2–1 | 3–0 |
| Barreirense | 2–3 | 3–3 | | 2–1 | 2–4 | 4–3 | 3–1 | 1–0 | 0–1 | 1–1 | 2–1 | 3–2 | 3–0 | 1–2 |
| Belenenses | 3–2 | 4–2 | 4–0 | | 2–2 | 5–0 | 5–1 | 5–0 | 5–1 | 4–3 | 2–2 | 2–0 | 6–2 | 5–1 |
| Benfica | 2–0 | 4–0 | 10–1 | 2–2 | | 1–0 | 6–0 | 2–2 | 3–0 | 3–2 | 1–1 | 6–0 | 3–0 | 4–0 |
| Caldas | 1–0 | 3–1 | 0–1 | 1–1 | 1–4 | | 2–1 | 2–2 | 4–2 | 1–1 | 1–7 | 3–2 | 3–1 | 3–5 |
| CUF Barreiro | 2–1 | 1–0 | 2–1 | 3–2 | 2–3 | 1–0 | | 5–3 | 2–0 | 2–5 | 0–0 | 1–1 | 1–0 | 3–1 |
| Lusitano Évora | 3–1 | 5–0 | 3–2 | 5–2 | 1–2 | 2–0 | 3–1 | | 0–2 | 3–2 | 2–1 | 3–2 | 2–0 | 4–1 |
| Oriental | 0–2 | 0–1 | 2–1 | 1–1 | 1–1 | 1–1 | 1–1 | 3–1 | | 0–3 | 1–0 | 2–0 | 1–1 | 2–1 |
| Porto | 5–1 | 0–0 | 4–0 | 5–0 | 3–0 | 4–0 | 4–0 | 7–1 | 5–0 | | 2–0 | 8–1 | 2–0 | 4–1 |
| Sporting CP | 1–3 | 3–0 | 3–0 | 2–2 | 1–0 | 6–0 | 8–0 | 1–1 | 3–1 | 2–1 | | 7–1 | 3–1 | 4–0 |
| Sporting da Covilhã | 0–1 | 2–1 | 3–0 | 3–2 | 1–3 | 0–0 | 2–1 | 2–0 | 1–1 | 0–1 | 4–3 | | 2–4 | 2–0 |
| Torreense | 2–1 | 1–0 | 3–2 | 6–2 | 1–1 | 4–0 | 2–1 | 1–3 | 4–1 | 1–1 | 0–0 | 5–0 | | 1–4 |
| Vitória de Setúbal | 3–1 | 4–0 | 2–0 | 1–2 | 2–3 | 1–1 | 4–1 | 1–1 | 1–1 | 1–7 | 0–0 | 2–1 | 2–3 | |

Legend: Blue = home team win; Yellow = draw; Red = away team win.
