= F.C. Barreirense =

Portuguese association football club

Barreirense
- Full name: Futebol Clube Barreirense
- Founded: 11 April 1911; 115 years ago
- Stadium: Campo da Verderena
- Capacity: 2.480
- President: Hugo Máximo
- Head coach: Rui Santos
- League: Setúbal FA First Division
- Website: www.fcbarreirense.pt
Home colours	Away colours

Futebol Clube Barreirense is a Portuguese sports club founded on 11 April 1911. The main sports are football and basketball. In both sports, the club has represented Portugal in European competitions. In basketball, the club won 2 national championships and 6 Portuguese Cups. The club also offers chess, gymnastics and kick-boxing.

== Football ==
The football club became champion of the Segunda Divisão seven times. In the 1969–70 season, FC Barreirense achieved its highest place ever in the Primeira Divisão, reaching fourth place. That team included player Manuel Bento. The following year, the club represented the country in the 1970–71 Inter-Cities Fairs Cup. They managed to win 2–0 against Dinamo Zagreb in Barreiro, but lost in the away game with 6–1 and were eliminated.

Barreirense's major rival is Fabril, formerly Quimigal, with whom they have shared many seasons from the Primeira Liga all the way down to the Setúbal FA League.

Barreirense was known as a former of young players that developed careers in the service of the biggest clubs and the Portugal national team. In particular, Benfica have scouted many talents from Barreirense, including Arsénio Duarte, Manuel Bento, José Augusto, Carlos Manuel, and João Cancelo.

=== Honours ===
- Segunda Divisão: 6 (2nd Tier: 1934–1990; 3rd Tier: 1990–present)
  - 1942–43, 1950–51, 1959–60, 1961–62, 1966–67, 1968–69
- "FPF" Cup (Segunda Divisão): 1
  - 1976–77
- Taça Ribeiro dos Reis: 1
  - 1967–68
- Campeonato de Portugal Runners-up: 2
  - 1929–30, 1933–34

=== Europe ===
1970–71 Inter-Cities Fairs Cup – First round
Date	Home	Result	Away	City
16 September 1970	(Portugal) FC Barreirense	2–0	(Socialist Federal Republic of Yugoslavia) NK Dinamo Zagreb	Barreiro
30 September 1970	(Socialist Federal Republic of Yugoslavia) NK Dinamo Zagreb	6–1	(Portugal) FC Barreirense	Zagreb

=== Managers ===
- (Portugal) Paulo Torres (2006)

== Basketball ==
Basketball started to be played at the club from 1927 onwards and over the years, Barreirense has always remained at the top of the Portuguese national basketball. They won two national championships, six cups and participated in the European Clubs Championship twice. On the first occasion, Barreirense played against Real Madrid CF. The game was the first game in a European competition for a Portuguese club and was the first basketball match to be broadcast live on Portuguese television. Barreirense, however, never won a match during their European campaigns.

FC Barreirense has won the national Under-20 and Under-16 championships several times, in addition to participating in several Final Four's. The club is the first Portuguese Club to have a former school player, playing in NBA: Neemias Queta.

=== Honours ===
- Champion:

- 2 Portuguese Championships (1956/1957; 1957/1958)
- 6 Portuguese Cups (1956/1957; 1959/1960; 1962/1963; 1981/1982; 1983/1984; 1984/1985)
- 10 Portuguese Championships Under-20 (1953/1954; 1955/1956; 1956/1957; 1965/1966; 1974/1975; 1976/1977; 2001/2002; 2005/2006; 2006/2007; 2008/2009)
- 6 Portuguese Championships Under-18 (2000/2001; 2002/2003; 2003/2004; 2004/2005; 2005/2006; 2007/2008)
- 10 Portuguese Championships Under-16 (1975/1976; 1994/1995; 1997/1998; 1998/1999; 2001/2002; 2002/2003; 2003/2004; 2004/2005; 2007/2008)

- Overall Ranking Portuguese Championships (Top 5)

- S.L. Benfica - 85
- FC Porto - 67
- FC Barreirense - 37
- A.D. Ovarense - 26
- FC Porto - 18

- Portuguese Championships Top 5:

- S.L. Benfica - 41
- FC Porto - 37
- FC Barreirense - 32
- SC Vasco da Gama - 13
- Sporting CP - 12

- Portuguese Championships Top 3 (Under-20 and Under-18):

- FC Barreirense - 18
- FC Porto - 16
- S.L. Benfica - 12

- Portuguese Championships Top 3 (Under-16):

- FC Barreirense - 10
- FC Porto - 7
- S.L. Benfica - 5

=== Europe ===
Date	Home	Result	Away	City
12/03/1958	(Portugal) FC Barreirense	51-68	(Spain) Real Madrid CF	Barreiro
20/04/1958	(Spain) Real Madrid CF	86-40	(Portugal) FC Barreirense	Madrid
??/??/1958	(France) Étoile de Charleville	77-40	(Portugal) FC Barreirense	Charleville-Mézières
22/11/1958	(Portugal) FC Barreirense	27-63	(France) Étoile de Charleville	Barreiro
