= 1959–60 Primeira Divisão =

26th season of top-tier Portuguese football

Primeira Divisão
- Season: 1959–60
- Champions: Benfica; 10th title
- Relegated: Vitória de Setúbal; Boavista
- European Cup: Benfica; Sporting CP
- Matches: 182
- Goals: 599 (3.29 per match)

The 1959–60 Primeira Divisão was the 26th season of top-tier football in Portugal.

== Overview ==
Location of teams in the 1959–60 Liga

It was contested by 14 teams, and S.L. Benfica won the championship.

== League standings ==
Pos	Team	Pld	W	D	L	GF	GA	GD	Pts	Qualification or relegation
1	Benfica (C)	26	20	5	1	75	27	+48	45	Qualified for the European Cup
2	Sporting CP	26	19	5	2	82	20	+62	43	
3	Belenenses	26	15	6	5	58	25	+33	36	
4	Porto	26	13	4	9	48	36	+12	30	
5	CUF Barreiro	26	10	5	11	36	39	−3	25	
6	Académica	26	8	9	9	40	41	−1	25	
7	Vitória de Guimarães	26	8	7	11	47	43	+4	23	
8	Leixões	26	8	7	11	48	56	−8	23	
9	Sporting da Covilhã	26	8	6	12	32	49	−17	22	
10	Lusitano de Évora	26	6	9	11	32	55	−23	21	
11	Atlético	26	7	7	12	34	46	−12	21	
12	Braga	26	6	8	12	24	39	−15	20	
13	Vitória de Setúbal (R)	26	5	8	13	26	52	−26	18	Relegated to Segunda Divisão
14	Boavista (R)	26	4	4	18	27	81	−54	12	Relegated to Segunda Divisão

Source: rsssf.com
(C) Champions; (R) Relegated

== Results ==
Home \ Away	ACA	ACP	BEL	BEN	BOA	BRA	CUF	LEX	LUS	POR	SCP	SCO	VGU	VSE
Académica		1–0	0–5	0–2	6–2	0–0	0–2	8–1	1–1	1–0	2–2	5–1	0–0	0–0
Atlético CP	2–2		1–1	0–4	4–0	1–0	2–2	4–2	3–1	0–0	1–1	4–0	3–3	2–0
Belenenses	1–2	4–1		0–0	8–0	4–4	2–1	4–0	4–0	1–0	1–0	1–0	3–1	1–2
Benfica	5–1	2–1	1–2		9–0	2–0	2–1	1–1	5–3	2–1	4–3	2–1	4–1	4–1
Boavista	1–3	3–2	0–1	0–2		0–0	0–3	1–1	4–2	1–5	2–5	1–1	2–1	3–1
Braga	2–0	0–0	1–4	0–3	3–1		1–5	1–0	0–0	0–0	0–2	3–0	5–0	1–1
CUF Barreiro	1–1	1–0	1–0	1–5	1–0	2–0		1–3	1–1	2–0	0–1	1–2	1–1	3–1
Leixões	1–1	2–0	1–1	1–2	4–2	2–0	3–1		2–1	2–2	1–2	6–0	1–1	5–0
Lusitano Évora	1–0	4–1	2–2	2–3	1–0	0–0	2–1	3–2		0–3	2–2	0–0	1–0	1–1
Porto	3–1	4–0	2–3	2–2	2–1	1–2	5–0	4–2	3–1		1–4	2–0	3–2	1–0
Sporting CP	2–1	3–0	2–0	1–1	5–0	4–0	2–0	5–1	6–0	6–1		4–0	1–1	8–0
Sporting da Covilhã	4–0	3–1	0–0	1–4	4–0	1–0	2–3	2–2	3–2	3–1	0–1		0–0	1–1
Vitória de Guimarães	1–3	3–0	2–5	1–1	5–1	1–0	3–1	7–1	7–0	0–1	0–3	4–1		0–1
Vitória de Setúbal	1–1	0–1	1–0	2–3	2–2	5–1	0–0	2–1	1–1	0–1	1–7	1–2	1–2	

Legend: Blue = home team win; Yellow = draw; Red = away team win.
