= Otto Glória =

Brazilian football coach

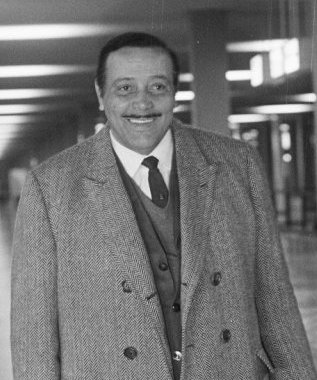
- Glória in 1969

Personal information
- Full name: Otto Martins Glória
- Date of birth: 9 January 1917
- Place of birth: Rio de Janeiro, Brazil
- Date of death: 4 September 1986 (aged 69)

Managerial career
- Years: Team
- 1951: Vasco da Gama
- 1954–1959: Benfica
- 1959–1961: Belenenses
- 1961: Sporting
- 1962: Marseille
- 1963: Vasco da Gama
- 1964–1965: Porto
- 1965–1966: Sporting
- 1964–1966: Portugal
- 1966–1968: Atlético Madrid
- 1968–1970: Benfica
- 1971–1972: Grêmio
- 1973–1977: Portuguesa
- 1977: Santos
- 1978–1979: Monterrey
- 1979: Vasco da Gama
- 1978–1981: Nigeria
- 1982–1983: Portugal
Medal record
Men's football
Representing Portugal (as manager)
FIFA World Cup
Third place	1966
Representing Nigeria (as manager)
Africa Cup of Nations
Winner	1980

Otto Martins Glória (9 January 1917 – 4 September 1986) was a Brazilian football coach.

== Career ==
Glória was born in Rio de Janeiro, Brazil, but had his greatest successes with Benfica in Portugal, guiding the club to nine national trophies. With the Nigeria national team he won the 1980 African Cup of Nations.

In his first period with Benfica, the club was transformed to professional standards. Supported by president Joaquim Ferreira Bogalho, Glória founded a home for the players and focused on recruiting players from the periphery of the Portuguese capital and also from the African overseas provinces. In these years, between 1954 and 1959, the club won two league titles and three Portuguese Cups, and in European competition, they reached the Latin Cup final in 1957, losing 1–0 to Alfredo di Stéfano's Real Madrid at the Santiago Bernabéu.

In February 1962 he took the reins of Olympique Marseille. The club was then stuck in the second division and saw its aspirations to return to the first division endangered. In his four months with the club he did not lose a single match and achieved its objective.

In his second tenure with Benfica he had continuous success on the national level, winning two more championships and cups. He also led the club into the final of the 1967–68 European Cup in London against Manchester United, which was lost 1–4.

At the 1966 FIFA World Cup in England he led the Portugal national team, pushed by Eusébio's goals (the tournament's top scorer), to a historical third place. In the process Portugal inflicted a 1–3 defeat on Glória's home country Brazil.

In 1979, he became runner-up with CR Vasco da Gama of Rio de Janeiro in the Brazilian championship, losing in the final 1–2 against SC Internacional Porto Alegre, which remained undefeated throughout the competition.

In the following year, he guided Nigeria through the 1980 African Nations Cup, which the team won in the final in Lagos with 3–0 against Algeria, and the Olympics in 1980 in Moscow. He left this position after poor performances at the 1982 campaign in Libya.

Glória coached Portugal, in 1982, in qualifying matches for UEFA Euro 1984, but resigned after a 0–4 defeat in a friendly match against Brazil the following year.

== Managerial statistics ==
Managerial record by team and tenure
Team	From	To	Record							
Team	From	To	G	W	D	L	GF	GA	GD	Win %
Vasco da Gama	1 August 1951	7 January 1952	30	14	5	11	64	49	+15	46.67
Benfica	1 August 1954	14 June 1959	169	113	30	26	447	163	+284	66.86
Belenenses	30 June 1959	4 April 1961	62	40	9	13	135	60	+75	64.52
Sporting CP	4 April 1961	24 September 1961	12	7	4	1	32	14	+18	58.33
Olympique de Marseille	25 January 1962	1 July 1962	14	8	4	2	25	9	+16	57.14
Vasco da Gama	16 June 1963	17 November 1963	20	9	5	6	33	21	+12	45.00
FC Porto	17 November 1963	9 May 1965	61	38	13	10	118	62	+56	62.30
Portugal	15 November 1964	13 November 1966	20	15	2	3	41	16	+25	75.00
Sporting CP	1 September 1965	30 June 1966	40	25	9	6	91	34	+57	62.50
Atlético Madrid	10 August 1966	18 March 1968	100	47	26	27	126	74	+52	47.00
Benfica	8 April 1968	8 February 1970	75	45	16	14	170	65	+105	60.00
Grêmio	1 January 1971	31 December 1972	109	59	29	21	146	79	+67	54.13
Portuguesa	1 January 1973	12 October 1977	220	83	85	52	274	203	+71	37.73
Santos	14 October 1977	1 December 1977	18	5	6	7	21	22	−1	27.78
Nigeria	20 March 1978	5 October 1981	26	12	9	5	34	21	+13	46.15
Monterrey	30 June 1978	30 June 1979	44	15	16	13	60	51	+9	34.09
Vasco da Gama	30 June 1979	30 December 1979	42	25	8	9	88	34	+54	59.52
Portugal	22 September 1982	8 June 1983	7	3	1	3	5	13	−8	42.86
Career total			1,049	543	277	229	1,795	930	+865	51.76

== Managerial honours ==
=== Club ===
Benfica

- Primeira Liga: 1954–55, 1956–57, 1967–68, 1968–69
- Taça de Portugal: 1954–55, 1956–57, 1968–69

Sporting CP

- Primeira Liga: 1961–62, 1965–66

Belenenses

- Taça de Portugal: 1959–60

Portuguesa

- Campeonato Paulista: 1973

=== International ===
Portugal

- FIFA World Cup: Third place 1966

Nigeria

- African Nations Cup: 1980

== See also ==
- List of football managers with the most matches
