= O Clássico =

Portuguese football club rivalry

- Location: Portugal
- Teams: Benfica; Porto
- First meeting: 28 April 1912; Friendly; Porto 2–8 Benfica
- Latest meeting: 20 September 2026; Primeira Liga; Porto 3–1 Benfica
- Next meeting: 28 February 2027; Primeira Liga; Benfica v Porto
- Stadiums: Estádio da Luz (Benfica); Estádio do Dragão (Porto)

Statistics
- Total meetings: 261
- Most wins: Porto (104)
- Most player appearances: Nené (44)
- Top scorer: José Águas (18)
- All-time series: Benfica: 93; Drawn: 64; Porto: 104
- Largest victory: Benfica 12–2 Porto; Primeira Divisão (7 February 1943)

O Clássico (lit. 'The Classic') is the name given in football to matches between Portuguese clubs S.L. Benfica and FC Porto. Originally, the term O Clássico only referred to games played in the league, but now tends to include matches that take place in other domestic competitions such as the Taça de Portugal, Taça da Liga and Supertaça Cândido de Oliveira. Despite being the two most decorated Portuguese clubs in European football, with seven European trophies between them, they have never faced each other in a European competition. Benfica and Porto are two of the three clubs known as the "Big Three" in Portugal, the other being Sporting CP.

The rivalry comes about as Lisbon and Porto are the two largest cities in Portugal, and both clubs are the most decorated football teams in Portugal.

== Rivalry ==
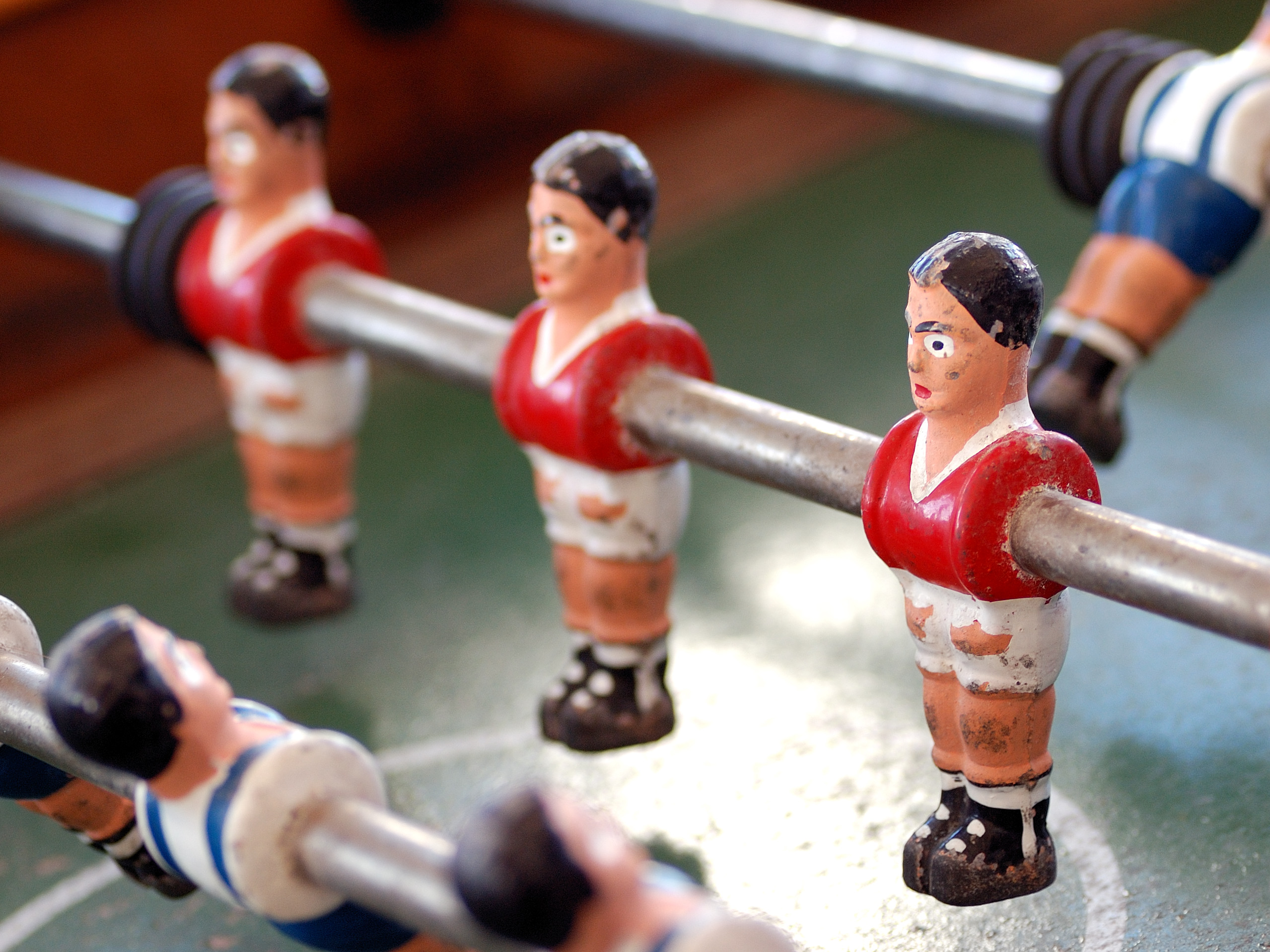
A fuzboll table depicting the rivalry between Benfica and Porto

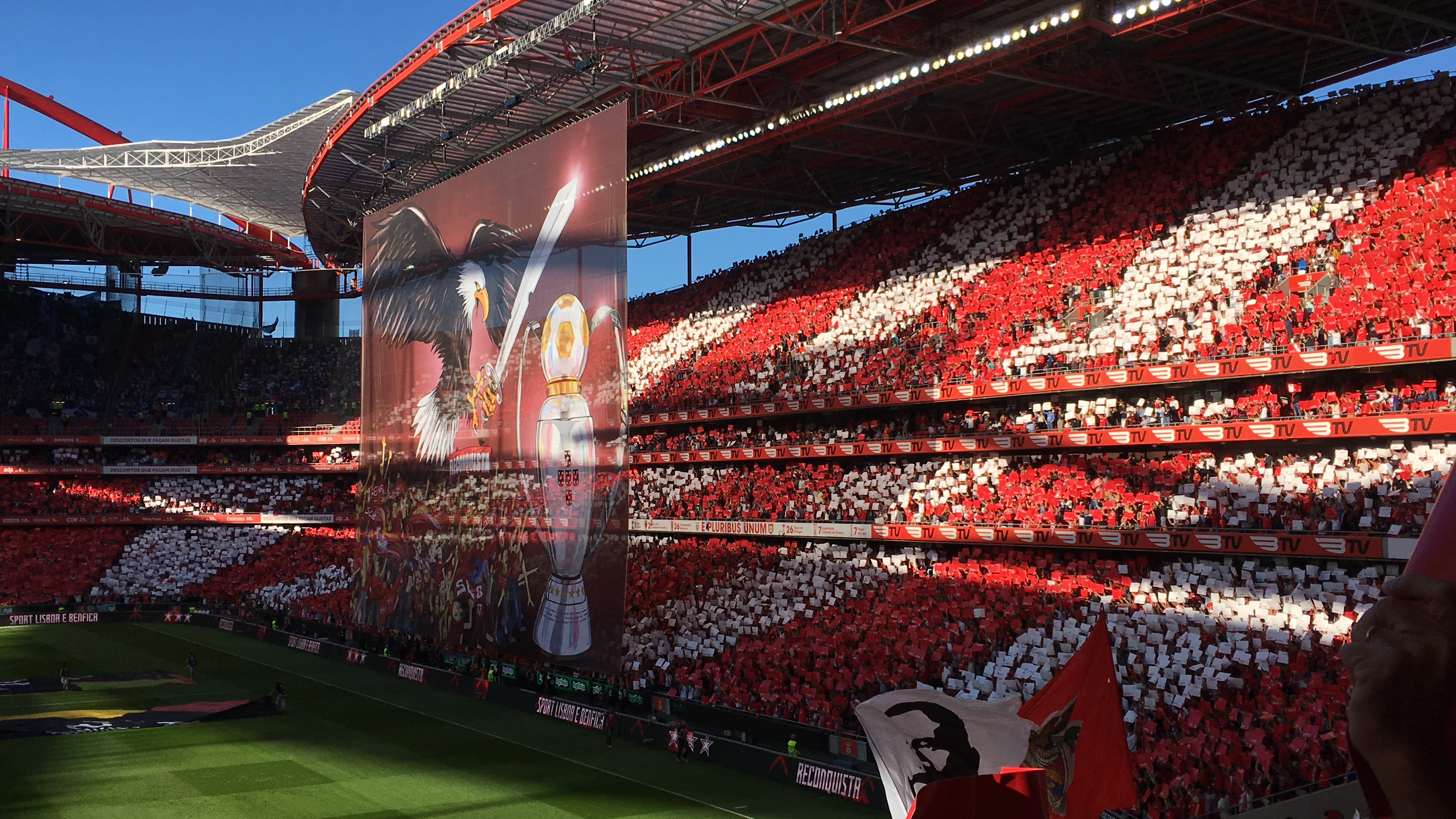
O Clássico at Estádio da Luz on 7 October 2018

The first match between the Águias and the Dragões was an exhibition game that was played on the 28 April 1912, when Benfica defeated Porto 8–2. Eight years later, Porto would win their first Clássico, 3–2. Porto would have to wait another nine years to accumulate their second victory over Benfica. Prior to the establishment of the Primeira Liga in 1934, both Benfica and Porto were competing within their football league district. Both sides were also competing in the Campeonato de Portugal which later became in 1938 the Taça de Portugal.

Until 1934, Benfica would win the Campeonato de Lisboa nine times as well as triumphing in the Taça de Honra de Lisboa twice, while Porto would win the Campeonato do Porto nineteen times as well as claiming the Taça de Honra do Porto twice. Benfica would meet Porto for the first time in an official match in the domestic cup competition which during the early periods of Portuguese football was the Campeonato de Portugal. Benfica defeated Porto in the final of the 1931 Campeonato de Portugal, 3–0 at the Campo do Arnado in Coimbra. Two goals from Vítor Silva and one from Augusto Dinis sealed the win to claim Benfica's second Campeonato de Portugal.

The inception of the Primeira Liga saw Porto win the very first edition of the competition. Both sides met for the first time in the competition on 3 February 1935, on which Porto won 2–1. Benfica would win the return tie 3–0. Despite Benfica's win, the Águias would finish third in the league, three points behind Porto. The next five seasons would see Benfica win three titles to Porto's two. During the 1940s, both sides would take a back seat to Sporting CP, which would win five league titles in the decade.

The late 1950s and 1960s saw Benfica dominate not just Portuguese football but also European football. The arrival of Eusébio saw Benfica secure eight league titles in ten years. Benfica's league titles were joined by two consecutive European Cups which were won in 1961, 3–2 against Barcelona, and in 1962, 5–3 against Real Madrid. The 1970s saw the continuation of Benfica's dominance up until the 1977–78 season, during which Porto won the league title for the first time in 19 years. The 1980s and early 1990s saw both Benfica and Porto battle for the league title. Porto's resurgence and the introduction of Jorge Nuno Pinto da Costa as chairman saw Porto reach new heights, winning the European Cup for the first time after defeating Bayern Munich 2–1 in the 1987 European Cup Final. Three years later, Benfica reached their eighth European final, the 1990 European Cup Final, losing 1–0 to Milan.

In the 1990s, Porto began to dominate Portuguese football, winning a record five consecutive league titles. The intensity between these two sides in the '90s was culminated by the fact that former Portuguese international teammates João Pinto, who played for Benfica, and Paulinho Santos, who played for Porto, publicly declared their dislike for each other. The new millennium saw a continuation of Porto's dominance. Porto would reach the heights of their 1987 European Cup final win after José Mourinho guided Os Dragões to the UEFA Cup in 2003 and the UEFA Champions League in 2004. Benfica won the league title in 2005 for the first time in over ten years to halter Porto's momentum. During the second half of the 2000s, both sides battled for top spot, with the rivalry intensified after Benfica's Cristian Rodríguez joined Porto in the summer of 2008 to become the third Benfica player in recent history to have made the switch. In 2010, after four seasons, Benfica won their 32nd league title. Also in 2010, Benfica defeated Porto 3–0 in the 2009–10 Taça da Liga final to win the first of what would be four straight Taça da Liga titles, a competition that Porto would only win in the 2022–23 edition against Sporting CP.

The next year, Porto recorded their biggest home win over As Águias, a 5–0 thrashing in a league fixture. Porto would secure a treble in the same season in which they claimed the league title, the Taça de Portugal as well as the UEFA Europa League. On 18 May 2014, Benfica made history after achieving the domestic treble of winning the Primeira Liga, Taça de Portugal and Taça da Liga. Later on, Benfica secured four more league titles – four in a row and 37 overall, the latter a Portuguese record – and won another two league cups, achieving a record seventh overall. Porto and Benfica would go back-and-forth as league champions from the 2017–18 season through to the 2019–20 season.

== Honours comparison ==
These are the major football honours of Benfica and Porto as of 1 August 2026.

National	Benfica	Porto
Championship of Portugal	3	4
Portuguese League	38	31
Portuguese Cup	26	20
Portuguese League Cup	8	1
Portuguese Super Cup	10	25
Total	85	81
International	Benfica	Porto
European Cup / UEFA Champions League	2	2
UEFA Cup / UEFA Europa League	—	2
European / UEFA Super Cup	—	1
Intercontinental Cup	—	2
Total	2	7
Grand total	87	88

== League matches ==
The matches listed below are only Primeira Liga matches, club name in bold indicates win. The score is given at full-time, and in the goals columns, the goalscorer and time when goal was scored is noted.

Team won the competition that season

#	Season	R.	Home team	Away team	Score	Goals (home)	Goals (away)
1	1934–35	N/A	**Porto**	Benfica	**2–1**	A. Carneiro (15), Pinga (60)	A. Valadas (62)
2	1934–35	N/A	**Benfica**	Porto	**3–0**	G. Pinto (32), Rogério (43), V. Silva (75)	
3	1935–36	N/A	Porto	Benfica	**2–2**	R. Castro (22), Pinga (p. 43)	L. Xavier (7), V. Silva (15)
4	1935–36	N/A	**Benfica**	Porto	**5–1**	Pinga (12, p. 30), V. Silva (14, 25), L. Xavier (87)	A. Santos (75)
5	1936–37	N/A	**Porto**	Benfica	**2–1**	Pinga (38), A. Santos (65)	G. Espírito Santo (19)
6	1936–37	N/A	**Benfica**	Porto	**6–0**	E. Santos (o.g. 1), A. Valadas (25), G. Espírito Santo (26), L. Xavier (45), Rogério (84), J. Nova (o.g. 88)	
7	1937–38	N/A	**Benfica**	Porto	**3–1**	Rogério (47), G. Espírito Santo (70), A. Valadas (72)	Costuras (40)
8	1937–38	N/A	Porto	Benfica	**2–2**	Costuras (22), Â. Silva (52)	Rogério (46), A. Valadas (64)
9	1938–39	N/A	**Benfica**	Porto	**4–1**	G. Pinto (p. 25), A. Brito (44), A. Duarte (59), G. Espírito Santo (60)	Pinga (30)
10	1938–39	N/A	Porto	Benfica	**3–3**	A. Santos (2, 61), Costuras (44)	Rogério (7), A. Brito (47, 62)
11	1939–40	N/A	**Porto**	Benfica	**4–2**	A. Santos (31), S. Kodrnja (p. 44, 80), F. Gomes da Costa (76)	M. Lourenço (60), F. Rodrigues (75)
12	1939–40	N/A	Benfica	**Porto**	**2–3**	J. Teixeira (45, 87)	Pinga (22, 73), S. Kodrnja (29)
13	1940–41	N/A	**Benfica**	Porto	**3–2**	G. Espírito Santo (24), F. Pires (47), A. Valadas (50)	S. Kodrnja (20), A. Santos (63)
14	1940–41	N/A	**Porto**	Benfica	**5–2**	C. Pratas (6, 16, 46), S. Kodrnja (35), F. Petrak (76)	J. Teixeira (38, 54)
15	1941–42	N/A	**Porto**	Benfica	**4–1**	M. Correia Dias (13, 30, 42), A. Santos (61)	F. Rodrigues (89)
16	1941–42	N/A	**Benfica**	Porto	**5–1**	F. Rodrigues (7, p. 43), M. Costa (20), J. Teixeira (47), A. Valadas (77)	C. Pratas (62)
17	1942–43	N/A	**Benfica**	Porto	**12–2**	A. Valadas (5, 31), Julinho (39, 55, 60, 61, 75), M. Costa (p. 44, 58), A. Pais (o.g. 46), F. Ferreira (77), J. Teixeira (85)	F. Póvoas (48), A. Araújo (67)
18	1942–43	N/A	Porto	**Benfica**	**2–4**	C. Pratas (43), F. Gomes da Costa (65)	Julinho (23), M. Costa (p.60, p. 85), N. Barros (64)
19	1943–44	N/A	Porto	Benfica	**2–2**	Pinga (15), J. Lourenço (48)	A. Valadas (75), Julinho (77)
20	1943–44	N/A	**Benfica**	Porto	**6–3**	M. Costa (15, p. 82), J. Teixeira (30, 62), Julinho (32), Rogério Pipi (40)	M. Correia Dias (3, 59), A. Araújo (33)
21	1944–45	N/A	**Porto**	Benfica	**4–3**	A. Catolino (1, 28), A. Araújo (68, 76)	G. Espírito Santo (40), J. Teixeira (65), Rogério Pipi (69)
22	1944–45	N/A	**Benfica**	Porto	**7–2**	Rogério Pipi (21), Mário Rui (28), V. Guilhar (o.g. 40), G. Espírito Santo (72), Arsénio (78), J. Teixeira (81, 86)	A. Araújo (63, 80)
23	1945–46	N/A	**Benfica**	Porto	**4–0**	Arsénio (26, 29), V. Guilhar (o.g. 31), Mário Rui (68)	
24	1945–46	N/A	Porto	**Benfica**	**0–2**		F. Ferreira (17), Rogério Pipi (25)
25	1946–47	N/A	**Porto**	Benfica	**3–2**	Octaviano (34), M. Correia Dias (48, 60)	Rogério Pipi (15, 53)
26	1946–47	N/A	**Benfica**	Porto	**4–0**	G. Espírito Santo (8), Julinho (70, 81), Rogério Pipi (76)	
27	1947–48	N/A	**Benfica**	Porto	**4–1**	A. Melão (41), Arsénio (p. 63), Julinho (81), G. Espírito Santo (83)	A. Araújo (69)
28	1947–48	N/A	Porto	**Benfica**	**0–2**		Rogério Pipi (21), A. Melão (62)
29	1948–49	N/A	Benfica	Porto	**1–1**	G. Espírito Santo (46)	F. Fandiño (p. 68)
30	1948–49	N/A	**Porto**	Benfica	**4–3**	E. Vital (2, 81), A. Araújo (22), Lino (77)	Arsénio (4), A. Melão (26), J. Rosário (53)
31	1949–50	N/A	Porto	**Benfica**	**0–1**		Julinho (25)
32	1949–50	N/A	**Benfica**	Porto	**3–2**	Rogério Pipi (28), R. Pascoal (81, 85)	E. Vital (35, 87)
33	1950–51	N/A	**Porto**	Benfica	**5–2**	Nelo (35), A. Monteiro da Costa (47, 72), E. Vital (57, 64)	J. Águas (36, 85)
34	1950–51	N/A	Benfica	**Porto**	**0–2**		A. Monteiro da Costa (23, 41)
35	1951–52	N/A	**Porto**	Benfica	**3–0**	C. Vieira (7, 44, 56)	
36	1951–52	N/A	**Benfica**	Porto	**2–0**	J. Águas (52, 65)	
37	1952–53	N/A	**Porto**	Benfica	**2–1**	Diamantino (33), A. Monteiro da Costa (77)	J. Águas (32)
38	1952–53	N/A	**Benfica**	Porto	**2–1**	J. Rosário (8), F. Caiado (59)	J. Pedroto (87)
39	1953–54	N/A	Benfica	Porto	**2–2**	F. Gato (69), J. Águas (85)	A. Porcel (44), A. Teixeira (67)
40	1953–54	N/A	**Porto**	Benfica	**5–3**	A. Teixeira (30), A. Monteiro da Costa (39, 57), Hernâni (48, 54)	Arsénio (60), A. Rosa (64, 67)
41	1954–55	N/A	**Benfica**	Porto	**1–0**	J. Águas (63)	
42	1954–55	N/A	**Porto**	Benfica	**3–0**	A. Monteiro da Costa (15, 62), José Maria (60)	
43	1955–56	N/A	**Porto**	Benfica	**3–0**	Gastão (1), Jaburú (23), A. Teixeira (77)	
44	1955–56	N/A	Benfica	Porto	**1–1**	J. Águas (76)	A. Teixeira (31)
45	1956–57	N/A	**Benfica**	Porto	**3–2**	Isidro (2), J. Águas (p. 47), F. Palmeiro (72)	Hernâni (p. 25, 88)
46	1956–57	N/A	**Porto**	Benfica	**3–0**	Jaburú (22), José Maria (59), Hernâni (90)	
47	1957–58	N/A	**Porto**	Benfica	**1–0**	A. Monteiro da Costa (p. 52)	
48	1957–58	N/A	Benfica	**Porto**	**2–3**	José Águas (43, 83)	A. Teixeira (7), C. Duarte (47), Hernâni (50)
49	1958–59	N/A	Porto	Benfica	**0–0**		
50	1958–59	N/A	Benfica	Porto	**1–1**	F. Salvador (34)	A. Teixeira (9)
51	1959–60	N/A	**Benfica**	Porto	**2–1**	J. Águas (19, 78)	Humaitá (54)
52	1959–60	N/A	Porto	Benfica	**2–2**	Luís Roberto (86), Humaitá (90)	D. Cavém (11), Mário João (85)
53	1960–61	N/A	**Benfica**	Porto	**2–0**	J. Águas (21, 59)	
54	1960–61	N/A	**Porto**	Benfica	**3–2**	Noé (32, 50), Hernâni (p. 75)	A. Mendes (12, 22)
55	1961–62	N/A	**Porto**	Benfica	**2–1**	A. Veríssimo (10), Jaime (77)	J. Águas (5)
56	1961–62	N/A	Benfica	Porto	**1–1**	J. Águas (57)	A. Veríssimo (18)
57	1962–63	4	Benfica	**Porto**	**1–2**	Eusébio (79)	A. Veríssimo (27, 60)
58	1962–63	17	Porto	**Benfica**	**1–2**	A. Veríssimo (29)	A. Simões (11), Eusébio (p. 53)
59	1963–64	6	Benfica	Porto	**2–2**	Santana (42, 46)	C. Duarte (41), Jaime (60)
60	1963–64	19	Porto	Benfica	**1–1**	J. Jorge (15)	José Augusto (31)
61	1964–65	9	**Benfica**	Porto	**4–0**	José Augusto (12, 40), Eusébio (27, 51)	
62	1964–65	22	**Porto**	Benfica	**1–0**	D. Naftal (21)	
63	1965–66	3	**Porto**	Benfica	**2–0**	D. Naftal (32), F. Nóbrega (73)	
64	1965–66	16	**Benfica**	Porto	**3–1**	Eusébio (p. 12, 38), J. Torres (67)	Manuel António (52)
65	1966–67	8	**Benfica**	Porto	**3–0**	Eusébio (11, 64), José Augusto (59)	
66	1966–67	21	Porto	Benfica	**1–1**	Manuel António (56)	José Augusto (12)
67	1967–68	12	**Benfica**	Porto	**3–2**	Eusébio (p. 20), J. Torres (23, 66)	Valdir (35, 60)
68	1967–68	25	Porto	Benfica	**1–1**	Djalma (84)	Eusébio (86)
69	1968–69	12	**Porto**	Benfica	**1–0**	C. Pinto (15)	
70	1968–69	25	Benfica	Porto	**0–0**		
71	1969–70	12	**Benfica**	Porto	**2–0**	A. Simões (6), Eusébio (27)	
72	1969–70	25	Porto	**Benfica**	**1–2**	J. Domingues (76)	A. Simões (6), Artur Jorge (24)
73	1970–71	5	Benfica	Porto	**2–2**	J. Torres (6), J. Graça (67)	A. Lemos (60, 88)
74	1970–71	18	**Porto**	Benfica	**4–0**	A. Lemos (20, 46, 54, 87)	
75	1971–72	1	Porto	**Benfica**	**1–3**	Abel (24)	Eusébio (49, 52), Artur Jorge (86)
76	1971–72	16	**Benfica**	Porto	**1–0**	A. Simões (60)	
77	1972–73	9	**Benfica**	Porto	**3–2**	V. Baptista (75), J. Graça (76), H. Coelho (90)	Abel (21), Flávio (63)
78	1972–73	24	Porto	Benfica	**2–2**	J. Heredia (26), Flávio (86)	Nené (15), Eusébio (57)
79	1973–74	8	**Benfica**	Porto	**2–1**	Eusébio (3), Nené (54)	Abel (69)
80	1973–74	23	**Porto**	Benfica	**2–1**	Abel (12), T. Cubillas (55)	Eusébio (33)
81	1974–75	7	Benfica	**Porto**	**0–1**		T. Cubillas (p. 15)
82	1974–75	22	Porto	**Benfica**	**0–3**		V. Martins (17), M. Moinhos (29), Toni (73)
83	1975–76	15	Porto	**Benfica**	**2–3**	F. Gomes (2), C. Simões (40)	V. Martins (7), R. Jordão (28, p. 35)
84	1975–76	30	Benfica	**Porto**	**2–3**	Toni (16), V. Baptista (33)	Ademir (51), Júlio (68, 88)
85	1976–77	14	Porto	**Benfica**	**0–1**		F. Chalana (11)
86	1976–77	29	**Benfica**	Porto	**3–1**	F. Chalana (14), M. Pietra (53, 60)	A. Taí (71)
87	1977–78	13	Benfica	Porto	**0–0**		
88	1977–78	28	Porto	Benfica	**1–1**	Ademir (83)	C. Simões (o.g. 3)
89	1978–79	2	**Porto**	Benfica	**1–0**	J. Costa (57)	
90	1978–79	17	Benfica	Porto	**1–1**	J. Alves (p. 21)	Duda (31)
91	1979–80	3	Benfica	Porto	**0–0**		
92	1979–80	18	**Porto**	Benfica	**2–1**	R. Reis (53), F. Gomes (73)	Nené (49)
93	1980–81	8	**Porto**	Benfica	**2–1**	M. Walsh (5), J. Costa (55)	Shéu (11)
94	1980–81	23	**Benfica**	Porto	**1–0**	J. Alves (44)	
95	1981–82	1	**Porto**	Benfica	**2–1**	Romeu (55), J. Magalhães (59)	Z. Filipović (87)
96	1981–82	16	**Benfica**	Porto	**3–1**	Nené (13, 72), H. Coelho (64)	Jacques (21)
97	1982–83	9	**Benfica**	Porto	**3–1**	A. Bastos Lopes (12), A. Veloso (35), Nené (85)	A. Inácio (40)
98	1982–83	24	Porto	Benfica	**0–0**		
99	1983–84	6	**Benfica**	Porto	**1–0**	Diamantino (62)	
100	1983–84	21	**Porto**	Benfica	**3–1**	A. Sousa (22), M. Walsh (56), A. Oliveira (o.g. 71)	Nené (57)
101	1984–85	3	**Porto**	Benfica	**2–0**	F. Gomes (16, 18)	
102	1984–85	18	Benfica	**Porto**	**0–1**		F. Gomes (70)
103	1985–86	1	**Porto**	Benfica	**2–0**	Juary (4), F. Gomes (79)	
104	1985–86	16	Benfica	Porto	**0–0**		
105	1986–87	1	Porto	Benfica	**2–2**	F. Gomes (14), Juary (63)	R. Águas (54), C. Carlos (86)
106	1986–87	16	**Benfica**	Porto	**3–1**	R. Águas (2, 45, 51)	F. Gomes (15)
107	1987–88	19	Benfica	Porto	**1–1**	Diamantino (49)	J. Magalhães (18)
108	1987–88	38	**Porto**	Benfica	**3–0**	J. Pacheco (52, p. 80), R. Barros (87)	
109	1988–89	10	Benfica	Porto	**0–0**		
110	1988–89	29	Porto	Benfica	**0–0**		
111	1989–90	6	**Porto**	Benfica	**1–0**	S. Demol (p. 18)	
112	1989–90	23	Benfica	Porto	**0–0**		
113	1990–91	15	Benfica	Porto	**2–2**	R. Gomes (11), R. Águas (68)	Domingos (57), E. Kostadinov (72)
114	1990–91	34	Porto	**Benfica**	**0–2**		C. Brito (81, 85)
115	1991–92	10	Porto	Benfica	**0–0**		
116	1991–92	27	Benfica	**Porto**	**2–3**	William (74), S. Yuran (85)	J. Pinto (64), E. Kostadinov (84), I. Timofte (89)
117	1992–93	11	**Porto**	Benfica	**1–0**	I. Timofte (p. 85)	
118	1992–93	28	Benfica	Porto	**0–0**		
119	1993–94	1	Porto	Benfica	**3–3**	Vinha (8), P. Pereira (62, p. 70)	Isaías (25, 63), R. Águas (27)
120	1993–94	18	**Benfica**	Porto	**2–0**	Aílton (37), R. Costa (55)	
121	1994–95	6	Benfica	Porto	**1–1**	Isaías (89)	S. Yuran (66)
122	1994–95	23	**Porto**	Benfica	**2–1**	Zé Carlos (7), L. Drulović (75)	J. Pinto (38)
123	1995–96	10	**Porto**	Benfica	**3–0**	Domingos (42, p. 85), P. Lipcsei (88)	
124	1995–96	27	**Benfica**	Porto	**2–1**	Valdo (p. 14), J. Pinto (52)	Emerson (51)
125	1996–97	15	Benfica	**Porto**	**1–2**	J. Pinto (50)	Mário Jardel (24), J. Costa (57)
126	1996–97	32	**Porto**	Benfica	**3–1**	Mário Jardel (57, 62), J. Costa (76)	Valdo (p. 71)
127	1997–98	15	**Porto**	Benfica	**2–0**	Artur (56, 73)	
128	1997–98	32	**Benfica**	Porto	**3–0**	B. Deane (16), K. Poborský (24), T. El Khalej (86)	
129	1998–99	12	**Porto**	Benfica	**3–1**	C. Chaínho (18), Mário Jardel (39, 54)	S. Kandaurov (57)
130	1998–99	29	Benfica	Porto	**1–1**	B. Basto (48)	Z. Zahovič (40)
131	1999–2000	11	**Porto**	Benfica	**2–0**	Capucho (4), Mário Jardel (25)	
132	1999–2000	28	**Benfica**	Porto	**1–0**	A. Sabry (67)	
133	2000–01	1	**Porto**	Benfica	**2–0**	D. Alenichev (23), J. Costa (43)	
134	2000–01	18	**Benfica**	Porto	**2–1**	P. Van Hooijdonk (p. 26, 80)	Capucho (41)
135	2001–02	5	Benfica	Porto	**0–0**		
136	2001–02	22	**Porto**	Benfica	**3–2**	Deco (42), D. Alenichev (49), Capucho (54)	Simão (18), Mantorras (55)
137	2002–03	7	**Porto**	Benfica	**2–1**	Bonfim (o.g. 20), Deco (71)	Tiago (4)
138	2002–03	24	Benfica	**Porto**	**0–1**		Deco (36)
139	2003–04	5	**Porto**	Benfica	**2–0**	Derlei (30), Argel (o.g. 52)	
140	2003–04	22	Benfica	Porto	**1–1**	Simão (49)	Costinha (29)
141	2004–05	6	Benfica	**Porto**	**0–1**		B. McCarthy (10)
142	2004–05	23	Porto	Benfica	**1–1**	B. McCarthy (65)	Geovanni (75)
143	2005–06	7	Porto	**Benfica**	**0–2**		Nuno Gomes (55, 63)
144	2005–06	24	**Benfica**	Porto	**1–0**	L. Robert (39)	
145	2006–07	8	**Porto**	Benfica	**3–2**	L. López (11), R. Quaresma (21), B. Moraes (90+3)	K. Katsouranis (62), Nuno Gomes (81)
146	2006–07	23	Benfica	Porto	**1–1**	L. González (o.g. 84)	Pepe (41)
147	2007–08	12	Benfica	**Porto**	**0–1**		R. Quaresma (42)
148	2007–08	27	**Porto**	Benfica	**2–0**	L. López (7, 80)	
149	2008–09	2	Benfica	Porto	**1–1**	Ó. Cardozo (56)	L. González (p. 10)
150	2008–09	17	Porto	Benfica	**1–1**	L. González (p. 72)	H. Yebda (45)
151	2009–10	14	**Benfica**	Porto	**1–0**	J. Saviola (23)	
152	2009–10	29	**Porto**	Benfica	**3–1**	B. Alves (42), E. Farías (59), F. Belluschi (82)	Luisão (56)
153	2010–11	10	**Porto**	Benfica	**5–0**	S. Varela (12), Radamel Falcao (25, 29), Hulk (p. 81, 90)	
154	2010–11	25	Benfica	**Porto**	**1–2**	J. Saviola (p. 17)	Roberto (o.g. 9), Hulk (p. 26)
155	2011–12	6	Porto	Benfica	**2–2**	Kléber (37), Otamendi (50)	Ó. Cardozo (47), N. Gaitán (82)
156	2011–12	21	Benfica	**Porto**	**2–3**	Ó. Cardozo (42, 47)	Hulk (7), J. Rodríguez (64), Maicon (87)
157	2012–13	14	Benfica	Porto	**2–2**	N. Matić (10), N. Gaitán (17)	E. Mangala (8), J. Martínez (15)
158	2012–13	29	**Porto**	Benfica	**2–1**	M. Pereira (26 o.g.), Kelvin (90+1)	Lima (19)
159	2013–14	15	**Benfica**	Porto	**2–0**	Rodrigo (13), E. Garay (53)	
160	2013–14	30	**Porto**	Benfica	**2–1**	R. Pereira (4), J. Martínez (39 p.)	E. Pérez (26 p.)
161	2014–15	13	Porto	**Benfica**	**0–2**		Lima (36, 56)
162	2014–15	30	Benfica	Porto	**0–0**		
163	2015–16	5	**Porto**	Benfica	**1–0**	A. André (86)	
164	2015–16	22	Benfica	**Porto**	**1–2**	K. Mitroglou (18)	H. Herrera (28), V. Aboubakar (65)
165	2016–17	10	Porto	Benfica	**1–1**	Diogo Jota (50)	L. López (90+2)
166	2016–17	27	Benfica	Porto	**1–1**	Jonas (7 p.)	M. Pereira (49)
167	2017–18	13	Porto	Benfica	**0–0**		
168	2017–18	30	Benfica	**Porto**	**0–1**		H. Herrera (90)
169	2018–19	7	**Benfica**	Porto	**1–0**	H. Seferovic (62)	
170	2018–19	24	Porto	**Benfica**	**1–2**	Adrián (19)	J. Félix (26), R. Silva (52)
171	2019–20	3	Benfica	**Porto**	**0–2**		Zé Luís (22), M. Marega (86)
172	2019–20	20	**Porto**	Benfica	**3–2**	S. Oliveira (10), A. Telles (38 p.), R. Dias (44 o.g.)	Carlos Vinícius (18, 50)
173	2020–21	14	Porto	Benfica	**1–1**	Taremi (25)	Grimaldo (17)
174	2020–21	31	Benfica	Porto	**1–1**	Everton (23)	Uribe (75)
175	2021–22	16	**Porto**	Benfica	**3–1**	Fábio Vieira (34), Pepê (37), Taremi (68)	Yaremchuk (46)
176	2021–22	33	Benfica	**Porto**	**0–1**		Sanusi (90+4)
177	2022–23	10	Porto	**Benfica**	**0–1**		R. Silva (72)
178	2022–23	27	Benfica	**Porto**	**1–2**	D. Costa (10 o.g.)	Uribe (45), Taremi (54)
179	2023–24	7	**Benfica**	Porto	**1–0**	Di María (68)	
180	2023–24	24	**Porto**	Benfica	**5–0**	Galeno (20, 44), Wendell (55), Pepê (75), Namaso (90)	
181	2024–25	11	**Benfica**	Porto	**4–1**	Carreras (30), Di María (56, 82 p.), Pérez (61 o.g.)	Aghehowa (44)
182	2024–25	28	Porto	**Benfica**	**1–4**	Aghehowa (81)	Pavlidis (1, 43, 69), Otamendi (90+4)
183	2025–26	8	Porto	Benfica	**0–0**		
184	2025–26	25	Benfica	Porto	**2–2**	Schjelderup (69), Barreiro (88)	Froholdt (10), Pietuszewski (40)
185	2026–27	7	Porto	Benfica	**3–1**	Veiga (31), Froholdt (54), Hwang (60)	Bah (51)
186	2026–27	24	Benfica	Porto	–		

=== Head-to-head results ===
Benfica wins	61
Draws	51
Porto wins	73
Benfica goals	284
Porto goals	274
Total matches	185

== Cup matches ==
The matches listed below are only Taça de Portugal matches, club name in bold indicates win. The score is given at full-time, and in the goals columns, the goalscorer and time when goal was scored is noted.

Team won the competition that season

#	Season	R.	Home team	Away team	Score	Goals (home)	Goals (away)
1	1938–39	SF (1st leg)	**Porto**	Benfica	**6–1**	A. Carneiro (6), Costuras (16, 69), Pinga (46), C. Nunes (62, 81)	A. Brito (22)
2	1938–39	SF (2nd leg)	**Benfica**	Porto	**6–0**	G. Espírito Santo (26, 65), A. Valadas (55, 71), F. Barbosa (60), Rogério (68)	
3	1940–41	QF (1st leg)	**Porto**	Benfica	**4–3**	C. Nunes (27), Costuras (16, 69), Pinga (38, 50), C. Pratas (68)	J. Teixeira (39), A. Valadas (46), F. Rodrigues (87 p.)
4	1940–41	QF (2nd leg)	**Benfica**	Porto	**2–0**	F. Rodrigues (42), F. Ferreira (84)	
5	1952–53	F	**Benfica**	Porto	**5–0**	Rogério (34), Arsénio (38, 68, 89), J. Águas (39)	
6	1957–58	F	**Porto**	Benfica	**1–0**	Hernâni (52)	
7	1958–59	F	**Benfica**	Porto	**1–0**	D. Cavém (1)	
8	1961–62	R16 (1st leg)	Porto	Benfica	**2–2**	Serafim (55), A. Veríssimo (85)	A. Mendes (3), Santana (51)
9	1961–62	R16 (2nd leg)	**Benfica**	Porto	**3–1**	A. Simões (28, 50), Eusébio (38)	Serafim (4)
10	1963–64	F	**Benfica**	Porto	**6–2**	José Augusto (10, 12), Eusébio (30 p.), A. Simões (48), Serafim (71), J. Torres (82)	C. Pinto (17), C. Batista (70)
11	1964–65	R32 (1st leg)	**Benfica**	Porto	**4–1**	José Augusto (13), Eusébio (15 p., 64), J. Torres (82)	Valdir (40)
12	1964–65	R32 (2nd leg)	Porto	Benfica	**1–1**	C. Baptista (25)	Eusébio (6)
13	1967–68	SF (1st leg)	Benfica	Porto	**2–2**	Eusébio (11), J. Graça (56)	Djalma (44, 61)
14	1967–68	SF (2nd leg)	**Porto**	Benfica	**3–0**	Djalma (47, 70), Pavão (83)	
15	1968–69	R64	**Benfica**	Porto	**3–0**	J. Atraca (6 o.g.), Eusébio (9, 81 p.)	
16	1971–72	SF	**Benfica**	Porto	**6–0**	V. Baptista (23, 72), Artur Jorge (46), Nené (49, 57), Valdemar (70 o.g.)	
17	1973–74	SF	Porto	**Benfica**	**0–3**		Nené (19, 59), Eusébio (66)
18	1979–80	F	**Benfica**	Porto	**1–0**	César (36)	
19	1980–81	F	**Benfica**	Porto	**3–1**	Nené (31, 55, 85)	A. Veloso (9 o.g.)
20	1981–82	QF	Porto	**Benfica**	**0–1** (a.e.t.)		Nené (93)
21	1982–83	F	Porto	**Benfica**	**0–1**		Carlos Manuel (20)
22	1984–85	F	**Benfica**	Porto	**3–1**	A. Nunes (14), M. Manniche (33, 47 p.)	P. Futre (67 p.)
23	1985–86	R16	**Benfica**	Porto	**2–1**	M. Manniche (p. 55), R. Águas (70)	P. Futre (50)
24	1987–88	SF	**Porto**	Benfica	**1–0**	R. Barros (86)	
25	1990–91	QF	**Porto**	Benfica	**2–1**	Domingos (45, 80)	R. Águas (30)
26	1992–93	R16	Porto	Benfica	**1–1** (a.e.t.)	Timofte (72)	A. Mostovoi (88)
27	1992–93	R16 (Replay)	**Benfica**	Porto	**2–0**	Isaías (58), S. Yuran (85 p.)	
28	1996–97	SF	**Benfica**	Porto	**2–0**	Valdir (28), Edgar (32)	
29	2000–01	R16	Benfica	Porto	**1–1** (a.e.t.)	Maniche (53)	S. Marić (84)
30	2000–01	R16 (Replay)	**Porto**	Benfica	**4–0**	D. Alenichev (10, 67 p.), Pena (28), C. Paredes (34)	
31	2003–04	F	**Benfica**	Porto	**2–1** (a.e.t.)	T. Fyssas (58), Simão (104)	Derlei (45)
32	2010–11	SF (1st leg)	Porto	**Benfica**	**0–2**		F. Coentrão (6), J. García (26)
33	2010–11	SF (2nd leg)	Benfica	**Porto**	**1–3**	Ó. Cardozo (80 p.)	J. Moutinho (64), Hulk (72), Radamel Falcao (74)
34	2013–14	SF (1st leg)	**Porto**	Benfica	**1–0**	J. Martínez (6)	
35	2013–14	SF (2nd leg)	**Benfica**	Porto	**3–1**	E. Salvio (17), E. Pérez (58 p.), A. Gomes (80)	S. Varela (52)
36	2019–20	F	Benfica	**Porto**	**1–2**	Carlos Vinícius (84 p.)	C. Mbemba (47, 59)
37	2021–22	R16	**Porto**	Benfica	**3–0**	Evanilson (1, 31), Vitinha (10)	
38	2025–26	QF	**Porto**	Benfica	**1–0**	Bednarek (15)	

=== Head-to-head results ===
Benfica wins	21
Draws	5
Porto wins	12
Benfica goals	75
Porto goals	47
Total matches	38

== League Cup matches ==
The matches listed below are only Taça da Liga matches, club name in bold indicates win. The score is given at full-time, and in the goals columns, the goalscorer and time when goal was scored is noted.

Team won the competition that season

#	Season	R.	Home team	Away team	Score	Goals (home)	Goals (away)
1	2009–10	F	**Benfica**	Porto	**3–0**	R. Amorim (10), C. Martins (45), Ó. Cardozo (90)	
2	2011–12	SF	**Benfica**	Porto	**3–2**	M. Pereira (4), Nolito (42), Ó. Cardozo (77)	Lucho González (8), E. Mangala (17)
3	2013–14	SF	Porto	Benfica	**0–0** (3–4 p.)		
4	2018–19	SF	**Porto**	Benfica	**3–1**	Y. Brahimi (24), M. Marega (35), Fernando (86)	Rafa (31)

=== Head-to-head results ===
Benfica wins	2
Draws	1
Porto wins	1
Benfica goals	7
Porto goals	5
Total matches	4

== Super Cup matches ==
The matches listed below are only Supertaça Cândido de Oliveira matches, club name in bold indicates win. The score is given at full-time, and in the goals columns, the goalscorer and time when goal was scored is noted.

Team won the competition that season

#	Season	R.	Home team	Away team	Score	Goals (home)	Goals (away)
1	1981	1st leg	**Benfica**	Porto	**2–0**	Nené (7, 29)	
2	1981	2nd leg	**Porto**	Benfica	**4–1**	Jacques (27, 65, 70), J. Costa (79)	J. Gomes (58)
3	1983	1st leg	Porto	Benfica	**0–0**		
4	1983	2nd leg	Benfica	**Porto**	**1–2**	M. Manniche (12)	A. Frasco (20), Vermelhinho (64)
5	1984	1st leg	**Benfica**	Porto	**1–0**	M. Manniche (56)	
6	1984	2nd leg	**Porto**	Benfica	**1–0**	Vermelhinho (87)	
7	1984	Replay (1st leg)	**Porto**	Benfica	**3–0**	Vermelhinho (5), F. Gomes (37, 88)	
8	1984	Replay (2nd leg)	Benfica	**Porto**	**0–1**		P. Futre (30)
9	1985	1st leg	**Benfica**	Porto	**1–0**	Diamantino (38)	
10	1985	2nd leg	Porto	Benfica	**0–0**		
11	1986	1st leg	Porto	Benfica	**1–1**	F. Gomes (32)	Rui Pedro (2)
12	1986	2nd leg	Benfica	**Porto**	**2–4**	Diamantino (67), Dito (88)	R. Madjer (36), P. Futre (57, 70), F. Gomes (81)
13	1991	1st leg	**Benfica**	Porto	**2–1**	S. Yuran (16), William (76)	J. Magalhães (61)
14	1991	2nd leg	**Porto**	Benfica	**1–0**	I. Timofte (67)	
15	1991	Replay	Benfica	Porto	**1–1** (3–4 p.)	Isaías (72)	J. Pinto (84)
16	1993	1st leg	**Benfica**	Porto	**1–0**	R. Águas (84)	
17	1993	2nd leg	**Porto**	Benfica	**1–0**	Vinha (84)	
18	1993	Replay	Benfica	Porto	**2–2** (3–4 p.)	J. Tavares (89), C. Brito (118)	Domingos (85), C. Secretário (95)
19	1994	1st leg	Benfica	Porto	**1–1**	V. Paneira (75)	Rui Filipe (72)
20	1994	2nd leg	Porto	Benfica	**0–0**		
21	1994	Replay	**Porto**	Benfica	**1–0**	Domingos (51)	
22	1996	1st leg	**Porto**	Benfica	**1–0**	Domingos (42)	
23	1996	2nd leg	Benfica	**Porto**	**0–5**		Edmílson (3), Artur (43), J. Costa (46), A. Wetl (56), L. Drulović (85)
24	2004	F	**Porto**	Benfica	**1–0**	R. Quaresma (55)	
25	2010	F	**Porto**	Benfica	**2–0**	Rolando (3), Radamel Falcao (67)	
26	2020	F	**Porto**	Benfica	**2–0**	Oliveira (25 p.), Díaz (90)	
27	2023	F	**Benfica**	Porto	**2–0**	Di María (61), Musa (68)	

=== Head-to-head results ===
Benfica wins	6
Draws	7
Porto wins	14
Benfica goals	18
Porto goals	35
Total matches	27

== Campeonato de Portugal matches ==
The matches listed below are only Campeonato de Portugal matches. The Campeonato de Portugal was created in 1922 and was the primary tournament in Portugal, where all teams competed from around the country. In 1938, the Campeonato de Portugal became what is now known as the Taça de Portugal. The club name in bold indicates win. The score is given at full-time and half-time (in brackets), and in the goals columns, the goalscorer and time when goal was scored is noted.

Team won the competition that season

#	Season	R.	Home team	Away team	Score	Goals (home)	Goals (away)
1	1930–31	F	**Benfica**	Porto	3–0	V. Silva (37, 65), A. Dinis (44)	
2	1931–32	SF (1st leg)	Benfica	**Porto**	1–2	P. Silva (57)	A. Mesquita (43), V. Mota (49)
3	1931–32	SF (2nd leg)	**Porto**	Benfica	3–0	V. Mota (30), Pinga (44), A. Mesquita (60)	
4	1932–33	QF (1st leg)	**Porto**	Benfica	8–0	V. Mota (7, 29, 85), A. Mesquita (20, 65, 85), A. Carneiro (57), C. Nunes (80)	
5	1932–33	QF (2nd leg)	**Benfica**	Porto	4–2	A. Dinis (30), O. Policarpo (31), L. Xavier (38), E. Pinho (55)	J. Pereira (3), Pinga (44)
6	1937–38	QF (1st leg)	**Porto**	Benfica	4–2	Pinga (17), C. Nunes (20), Costuras (40, 51)	Rogério (18), G. Espírito Santo (21)
7	1937–38	QF (2nd leg)	**Benfica**	Porto	7–0	A. Valadas (4), D. Lopes (17), L. Xavier (22, 28), G. Espírito Santo (25, 50, 55)	

=== Head-to-head results ===
Benfica wins	3
Draws	0
Porto wins	4
Benfica goals	17
Porto goals	19
Total matches	7

== Reserve team matches ==
Both Benfica's reserves, Benfica B, and Porto's reserves, Porto B, were established in the late 1990s. Both sides folded following the end of the 2005–06 season. The two teams were re-established in 2012 to compete in the 2012–13 Segunda Liga, where they met for the first time.

As of match played on 15 May 2026

Team won the competition that season

#	Season	R.	Home team	Away team	Score	Goals (home)	Goals (away)
1	2012–13	19	Porto B	Benfica B	2–2	Dellatorre (12), F. Martins (15)	Dellatorre (22 o.g.), L. Pimenta (35)
2	2012–13	40	Benfica B	Porto B	1–1	D. Rosado (47)	Edú (69)
3	2013–14	18	**Benfica B**	Porto B	3–1	S. Vitória (43), Lolo (60), H. Costa (75)	A. Silva (86)
4	2013–14	39	**Porto B**	Benfica B	4–1	L. Silva (30), Tozé (33, 45+2 p.), P. Moreira (43)	Lolo (40)
5	2014–15	22	**Benfica B**	Porto B	3–2	G. Guedes (13 p.), F. Cardoso (57, 73)	F. Ramos (36), G. Paciência (53)
6	2014–15	45	Porto B	**Benfica B**	0–3		V. Andrade (35), Hildeberto (51, 90+2)
7	2015–16	22	Benfica B	**Porto B**	0–3		Rafa (48), I. Díaz (49, 74)
8	2015–16	45	**Porto B**	Benfica B	3–1	D. Verdasca (10), J. Graça (25), R. Dias (54 o.g.)	P. Dawidowicz (37)
9	2016–17	17	Porto B	Benfica B	1–1	F. Ramos (30)	G. Costa (82)
10	2016–17	38	**Benfica B**	Porto B	2–1	Heriberto (55, 83)	Galeno (7)
11	2017–18	19	**Porto B**	Benfica B	3–1	A. Pereira (17), D. Dalot (35), Galeno (84 p.)	N. Santos (90+3)
12	2017–18	38	**Benfica B**	Porto B	3–0	O. John (24), G. Fernandes (46), Heriberto (90)	
13	2018–19	15	Porto B	Benfica B	2–2	M. Mouandilmadji (21), João Mário (48)	J. Gomes (2), I. Šaponjić (90+2)
14	2018–19	32	Benfica B	Porto B	1–1	N. Santos (38)	João Pedro (17)
15	2019–20	17	**Porto B**	Benfica B	2–1	F. Vieira (5), A. Sousa (59)	N. Santos (33)
16	2020–21	17	Porto B	Benfica B	1–1	Ndiaye (90+3)	P. Bernardo (90+1)
17	2020–21	34	**Benfica B**	Porto B	2–1	T. Gouveia (48), D. Mendes (72)	J. Mário (38)
18	2021–22	17	Benfica B	**Porto B**	1–2	L. Lopes (51)	G. Borges (30), J. Peglow (90+3)
19	2021–22	34	Porto B	**Benfica B**	2–3	D. Loader (9, 39 p.)	J. Tavares (26), Duk (53), M. Nóbrega (58)
20	2022–23	17	Benfica B	Porto B	2–2	Ge. Sousa (66), H. Pereira (86)	J. Marcelo (52), B. Folha (88)
21	2022–23	34	**Porto B**	Benfica B	3–1	B. Folha (38), J. Marcelo (52), R. Pinheiro (70)	D. Moreira (90+3)
22	2023–24	17	Porto B	**Benfica B**	0–3		Gustavo Marques (39), Cauê (59), G. Varela (84)
23	2023–24	34	**Benfica B**	Porto B	5–2	Cauê (20), P. Santos (25, 57), H. Pereira (28, 65)	R. Correia (68), Gustavo Marques (84 o.g.)
24	2024–25	17	**Benfica B**	Porto B	2–1	Gustavo Marques (19), Ge. Sousa (29)	A. Alarcón (53 p.)
25	2024–25	34	Porto B	**Benfica B**	1–4	A. Marcus (48)	D. Prioste (8), J. Rego (67), G. Varela (84, 90+3)
26	2025–26	17	Benfica B	Porto B	1–1	J. Trevisan (58 p.)	G. Brás (74)
27	2025–26	34	**Porto B**	Benfica B	2–0	Go. Sousa (51), D. Cunha (79)	

=== Head-to-head results ===
Benfica B wins	11
Draws	8
Porto B wins	8
Benfica B goals	50
Porto B goals	44
Total matches	27

Team	Home wins	Home draws	Home losses
Benfica B	7	4	2
Porto B	6	4	4

=== Premier League International Cup ===
As of match played on 3 February 2016

#	Date	R.	From Group A	From Group B	Score	Goals	Goals
1	2015–16	QF	Benfica B	**Porto B**	**0–1**		Gleison (34)

Note: the match was played on neutral ground.

== All-time head-to-head results ==
As of 20 September 2026

This section does not include exhibition games and matches between reserve teams.

Benfica wins	93
Draws	64
Porto wins	104
Benfica goals	401
Porto goals	380
Total matches	261
Total goals	781

== Records and statistics ==
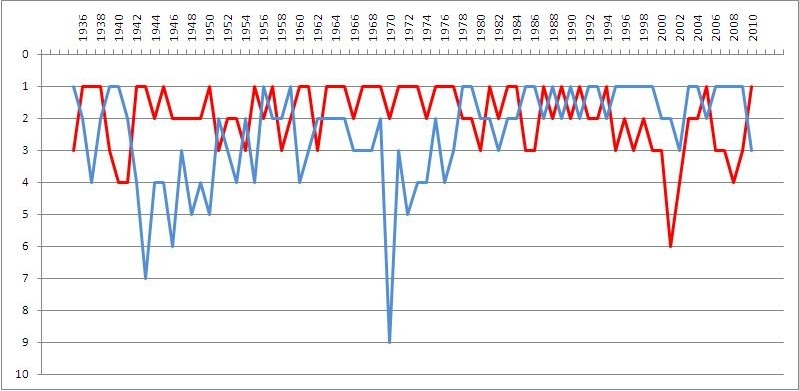
Chart showing the finishing league positions of Benfica (red) and Porto (blue) between the 1934–35 and 2009–10 seasons

- Biggest Benfica home win: Benfica 12–2 Porto (7 February 1943)
- Biggest Benfica away win: Porto 2–8 Benfica (28 May 1952, in the inauguration of Porto's Estádio das Antas)
- Most consecutive Benfica wins: 4 (12 September 1971 – 5 November 1972)
- Longest undefeated Benfica run: 7 (24 January 1982 – 8 December 1983)
- Most consecutive Benfica losses: 4 (10 February 2002 – 21 September 2003, 24 August 2019 – 23 December 2020)
- Most consecutive matches without Benfica winning: 9 (31 January 1988 – 17 April 1991)
- Biggest Porto home win: Porto 8–0 Benfica (28 May 1933)
- Biggest Porto away win: Benfica 0–5 Porto (18 September 1996)
- Most consecutive Porto wins: 4 (10 February 2002 – 21 September 2003, 24 August 2019 – 23 December 2020)
- Longest undefeated Porto run: 9 (31 January 1988 – 17 April 1991)
- Most consecutive Porto losses: 4 (12 September 1971 – 5 November 1972)
- Most consecutive matches without Porto winning: 7 (24 January 1982 – 8 December 1983)
- Most common result: 1–1 (14 times)

=== Most appearances ===
Competitive matches only, includes appearances as used substitute.

Rank	Player	Nationality	Club(s)	Years	Apps	Ref.
1	Nené	Portugal	Benfica	1970–1985	30	
2	Mário Coluna	Portugal	Benfica	1954–1970	28	
2	Francisco Ferreira	Portugal	Porto, Benfica	1936–1952	28	
4	Virgílio Mendes	Portugal	Porto	1947–1963	27	
5	Vítor Baía	Portugal	Porto	1988–1996; 1999–2006	24	
5	Frederico Barrigana	Portugal	Porto	1943–1956	24	
5	Humberto Coelho	Portugal	Benfica	1968–1975; 1977–1984	24	
5	Eusébio	Portugal	Benfica	1962–1975	24	
5	João Pinto	Portugal	Porto	1981–1997	24	
5	António Veloso	Portugal	Benfica	1980–1995	24	

=== Top goalscorers ===
Rank	Player	Nationality	Club(s)	Years	Goals	Ref.
1	José Águas	Portugal	Benfica	1950–1961	17	
2	Eusébio	Portugal	Benfica	1962–1974	16	
3	Joaquim Teixeira	Portugal	Benfica	1938–1946	12	
4	Julinho	Portugal	Benfica	1942–1953	11	
5	António Monteiro da Costa	Portugal	Porto	1949–1961	10	

== Players who played for both clubs ==
- (Portugal) Artur Augusto: Benfica 1915–21, 1923–25; Porto 1921–23
- (Portugal) Tavares Bastos: Benfica 1917–22; Porto 1922–24
- (Portugal) Francisco Ferreira: Porto 1937–38; Benfica 1938–52
- (Portugal) José Maria: Porto 1949–57; Benfica 1957–58
- (Portugal) Serafim: Porto 1960–63; Benfica 1963–67
- (Portugal) Paula: Porto 1959–66; Benfica 1966–68
- (Portugal) Artur Jorge: Porto 1964–65; Benfica 1969–75
- (Portugal) Abel: Benfica 1968–70; Porto 1970–76
- (Portugal) Carlos Alhinho: Porto 1976; Benfica 1976–77, 1978–81
- (Portugal) Romeu: Benfica 1975–77; Porto 1979–83
- (Portugal) Francisco Vital: Porto 1977–80; Benfica 1980–81
- (Portugal) Eurico Gomes: Benfica 1975–79; Porto 1982–87
- (Portugal) Eduardo Luís: Benfica 1975–76; Porto 1982–89
- (Portugal) Rui Águas: Benfica 1985–88, 1990–94; Porto 1988–90
- (Portugal) Dito: Benfica 1986–88; Porto 1988–89
- (Portugal) Paulo Futre: Porto 1984–87; Benfica 1993
- (Portugal) José Tavares: Porto 1990–91; Benfica 1994–95
- (Russia) Sergei Yuran: Benfica 1991–94; Porto 1994–95
- (Russia) Vasili Kulkov: Benfica 1991–94; Porto 1994–95
- (Brazil) Paulo Pereira: Porto 1988–94; Benfica 1994–96
- (Portugal) Fernando Mendes: Benfica 1989–91, 1992–93; Porto 1996–99
- (Portugal) Kenedy: Benfica 1993–96; Porto 1997–98
- (Portugal) Pedro Henriques: Benfica 1993–97; Porto 1997–98
- (Romania) Basarab Panduru: Benfica 1995–98; Porto 1998–99
- (Russia) Sergei Ovchinnikov: Benfica 1998–99; Porto 2000–02
- (Serbia) Ljubinko Drulović: Porto 1994–2001; Benfica 2001–03
- (Portugal) João Manuel Pinto: Porto 1995–2001; Benfica 2001–03
- (Brazil) Argel: Porto 1999; Benfica 2001–04
- (Portugal) Paulo Santos: Benfica 1993–94; Porto 2001–05
- (Slovenia) Zlatko Zahovič: Porto 1996–99; Benfica 2001–05
- (Portugal) Emílio Peixe: Porto 1997–2002; Benfica 2002–03
- (Portugal) Tiago Pereira: Benfica 1997–98; Porto 2002–04
- (Hungary) Miklós Fehér: Porto 1998–2002; Benfica 2002–04
- (Lithuania) Edgaras Jankauskas: Benfica 2002 (loan); Porto 2002–04
- (Portugal) Maniche: Benfica 1995–96, 1999–2002; Porto 2002–05
- (Croatia) Tomo Šokota: Benfica 2001–05; Porto 2005–07
- (Portugal) Marco Ferreira: Porto 2003–04; Benfica 2006–07
- (Brazil) Derlei: Porto 2002–05; Benfica 2007 (loan)
- (Uruguay) Cristian Rodríguez: Benfica 2007–08 (loan); Porto 2008–12
- (Portugal) César Peixoto: Porto 2002–07; Benfica 2009–12
- (Uruguay) Maxi Pereira: Benfica 2007–15; Porto 2015–19
- (Argentina) Nicolás Otamendi: Porto 2010–14; Benfica 2020–26

Sergei Yuran, Maxi Pereira, and Nicolás Otamendi are the only players who have scored a goal for both sides in O Clássico. Otamendi is the only player to have been sent off for both clubs.

== Managers who managed both clubs ==
- (Hungary) János Biri: Porto 1935–36; Benfica 1939–47
- (Hungary) Lippo Hertzka: Benfica 1936–39, 1947–48; Porto 1942–45
- (Hungary) Béla Guttmann: Porto 1958–59, 1973; Benfica 1959–62, 1965–66
- (Brazil) Otto Glória: Benfica 1954–59, 1968–70; Porto 1964–65
- (Romania) Elek Schwartz: Benfica 1964–65; Porto 1969–70
- (Chile) Fernando Riera: Benfica 1962–63, 1966–67; Porto 1972–73
- (Socialist Federal Republic of Yugoslavia) Tomislav Ivić: Porto 1987–88, 1993–94; Benfica 1992
- (Portugal) Artur Jorge: Porto 1984–87, 1988–91; Benfica 1994–95
- (Portugal) José Mourinho: Benfica 2000, 2025–26; Porto 2002–04
- (Portugal) Fernando Santos: Porto 1998–2001; Benfica 2006–07
- (Portugal) Jesualdo Ferreira: Benfica 2001–02; Porto 2006–10

== See also ==
- Derby de Lisboa
- FC Porto–Sporting CP rivalry
- List of association football club rivalries in Europe
