= List of FC Porto players =

Futebol Clube do Porto is a Portuguese sports club based in Porto that is best known for its professional football team playing in the country's top-tier division, the Primeira Liga. Porto played their first match a few days after the club's foundation in 1893, but only began playing competitively in 1911, when they took part and won the first José Monteiro da Costa Cup. Since then, the team has entered and often achieved success in several domestic and international football competitions. This list includes all the players that have made at least 100 competitive appearances for the first team, either as a member of the starting eleven or as a substitute.

João Pinto, former right-back and captain, holds Porto's record for most appearances, having played 587 matches during an uninterrupted senior career of 16 years at the club. He is one of only two players with over 500 first-team appearances; the other is former goalkeeper and also captain Vítor Baía, who appeared in 566 matches in 17 seasons. Four other players have made at least 400 appearances; among them is Aloísio, a former Brazilian centre-back who holds the team record for most appearances by a foreign player. Fernando Gomes is Porto's top goalscorer, with 347 goals in 455 appearances. The only other club player with more than 300 goals is Pinga, who scored 314 times in 15 consecutive seasons.

As of 9 October 2026, nine players currently active in the first team have made at least 100 appearances: Diogo Costa (goalkeeper, Portugal), João Mário (defender, Portugal), Iván Marcano (defender, Spain), Zaidu Sanusi (defender, Nigeria), Wendell (defender, Brazil), Marko Grujić (midfielder, Serbia), Stephen Eustáquio (midfielder, Canada), Galeno (forward, Brazil), Pepê (forward, Brazil).

== Table key ==
As of 14 December 2024

- The list is ordered first by year of first appearance, then by total number of appearances.
- Players active in the first team have their name shown in italics, and can add to their totals.
- Appearances and goals are counted only for first-team competitive matches in the Primeira Liga, Taça de Portugal (including the predecessor Campeonato de Portugal), Taça da Liga, Supertaça Cândido de Oliveira, European Cup/UEFA Champions League, UEFA Cup/UEFA Europa League, UEFA Super Cup, and defunct competitions such as Campeonato do Porto, Cup Winners' Cup, Inter-Cities Fairs Cup, and Intercontinental Cup.
- Position – Playing position: GK = goalkeeper, DF = defender, MF = midfielder, FW = forward
- Club career – First and last calendar years in which the player appeared for the club in any of the competitions listed above.
- Appearances – Number of matches played with the club (as starter and substitute)
- Goals – Number of goals scored with the club
- National team – Country represented by the player at international level during his career with the club.
- Caps – Number of international appearances made by a player during his career with the club (n/a = information not available).
- § – Player is a club record holder.

== Players with 100 or more appearances ==
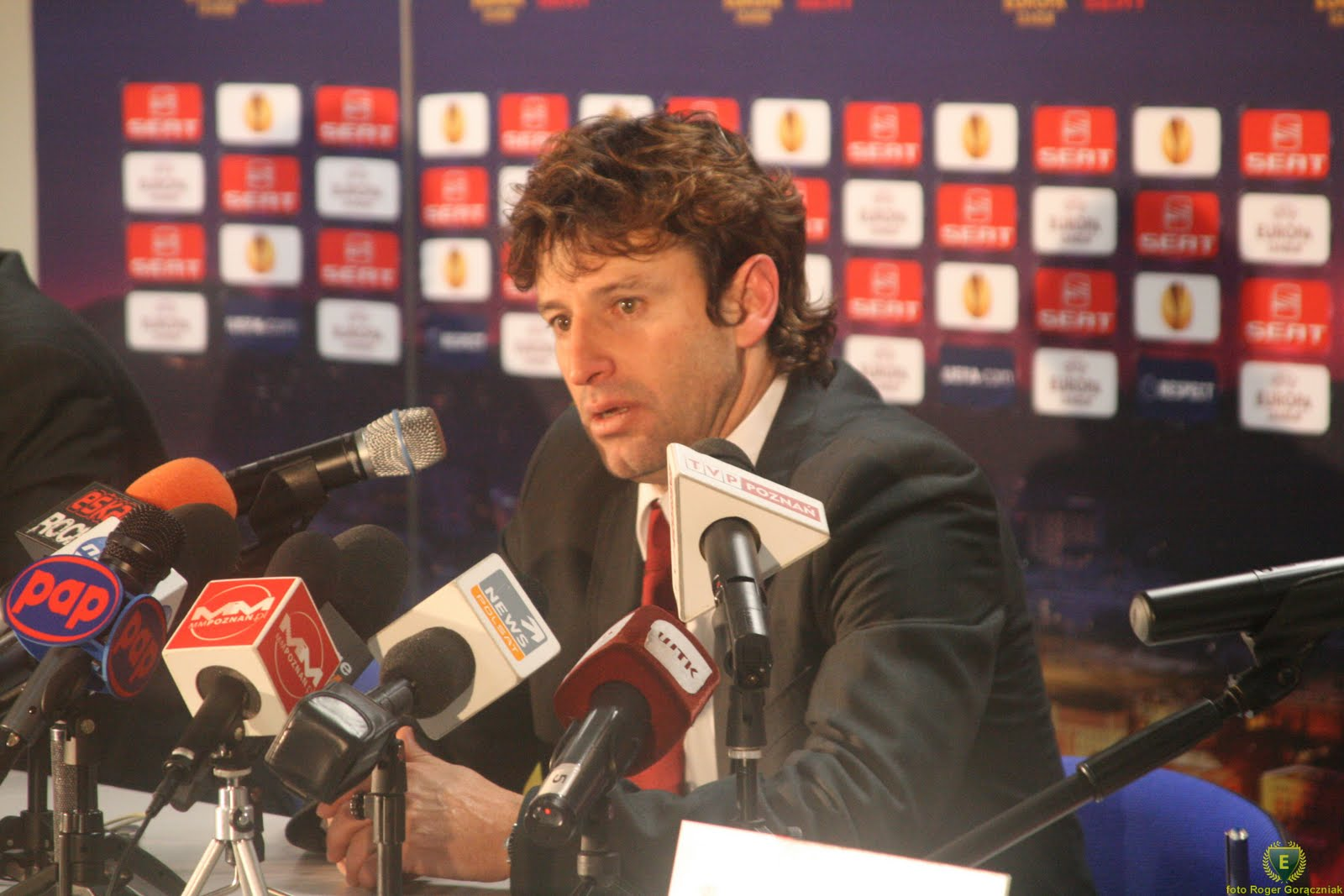
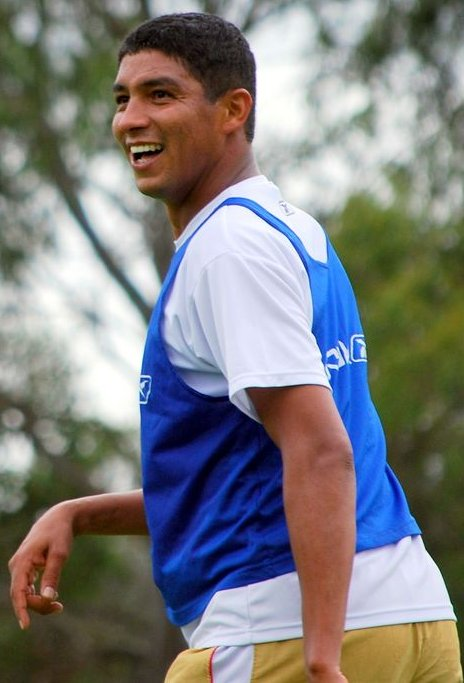
Domingos (top) was the league top scorer in 1995–96, while Mário Jardel (bottom) won this accolade in the following four seasons.

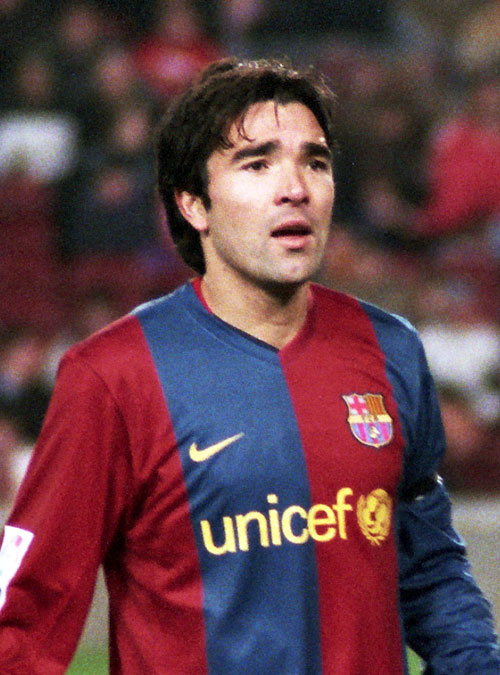
Deco (pictured playing for Barcelona) was a successful midfielder, winning the UEFA Cup and UEFA Champions League for Porto.

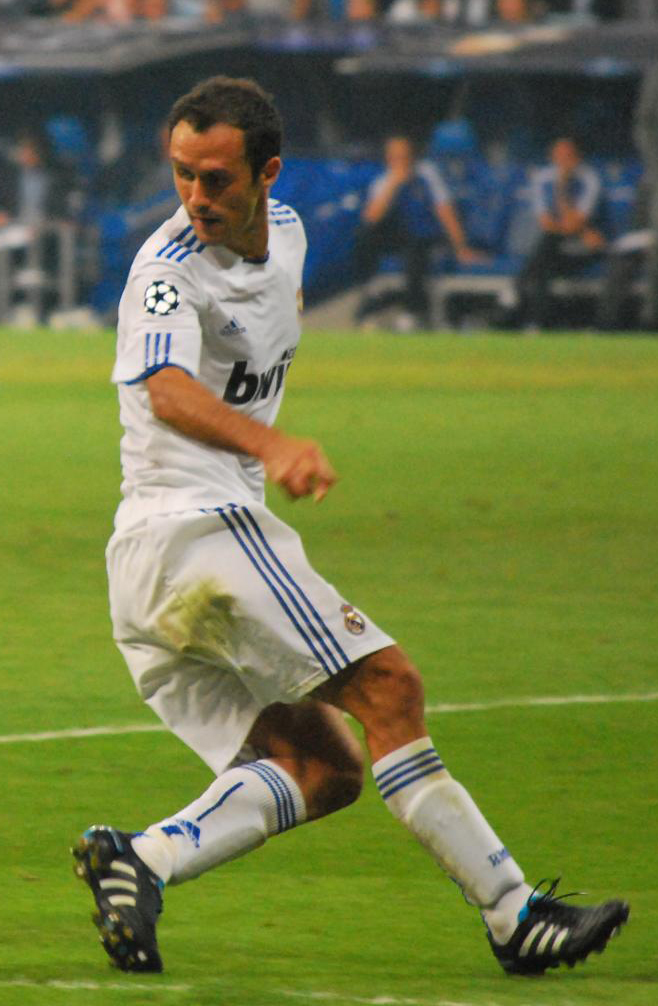
Ricardo Carvalho (pictured playing for Real Madrid) played in both UEFA competition finals won by Porto in 2003 and 2004.

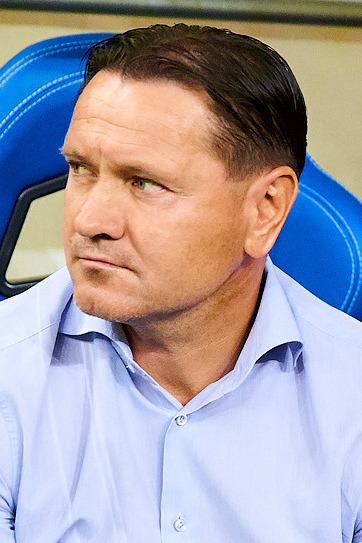
Dmitri Alenichev is the only Russian player to have won the UEFA Champions League.

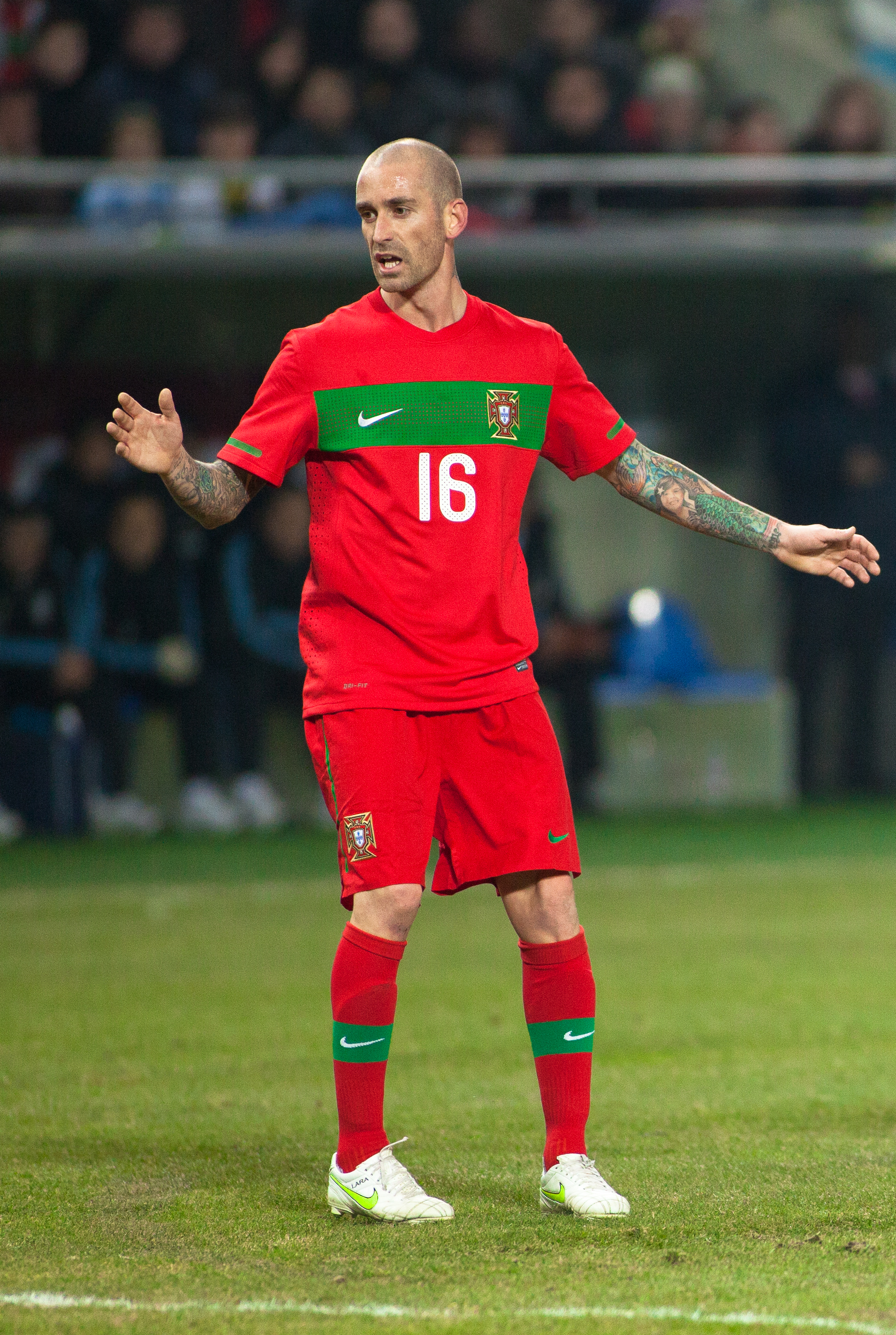
Raul Meireles (pictured playing for Portugal) won four consecutive league titles for Porto in almost 200 appearances.

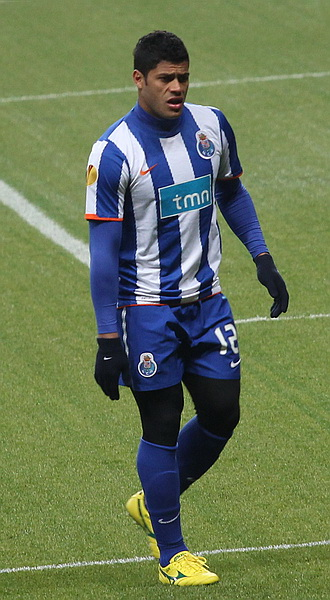
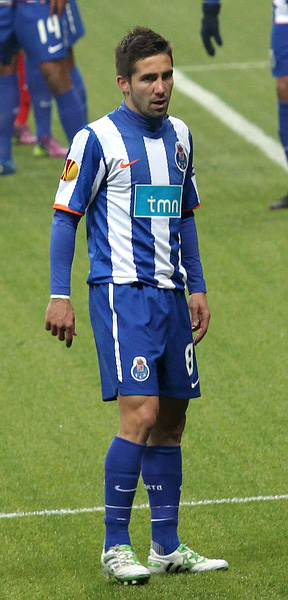
Hulk (top) and João Moutinho (bottom) won a record four titles in a record 53 appearances in the 2010–11 season.

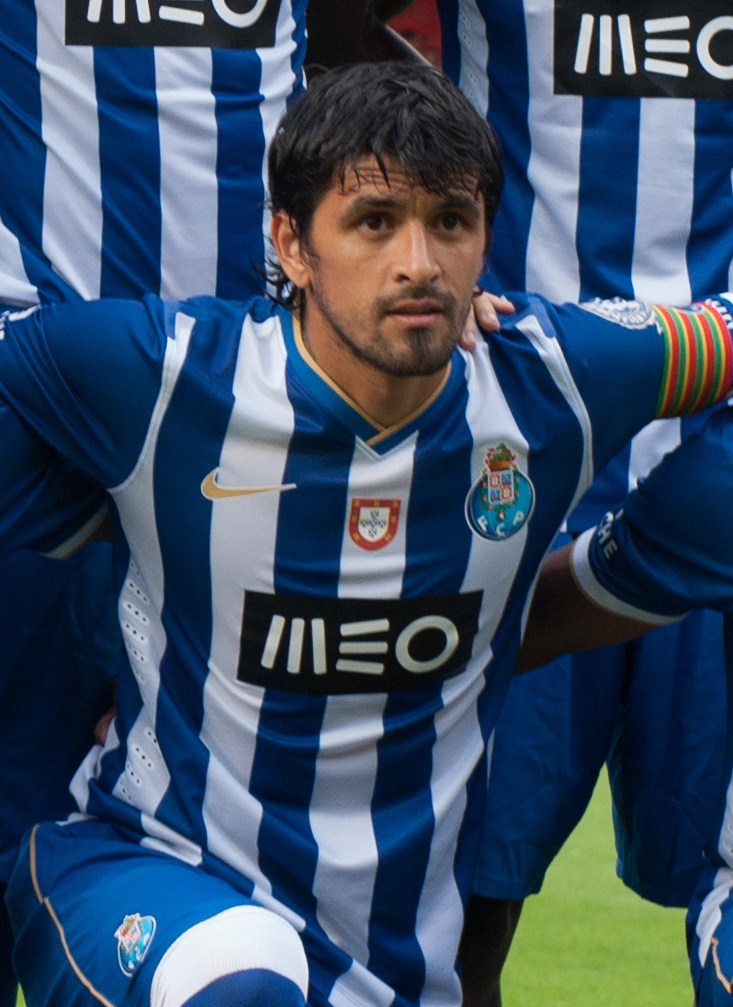
Lucho González had two separate spells at the club and appeared in more than 200 official games, winning ten major titles.

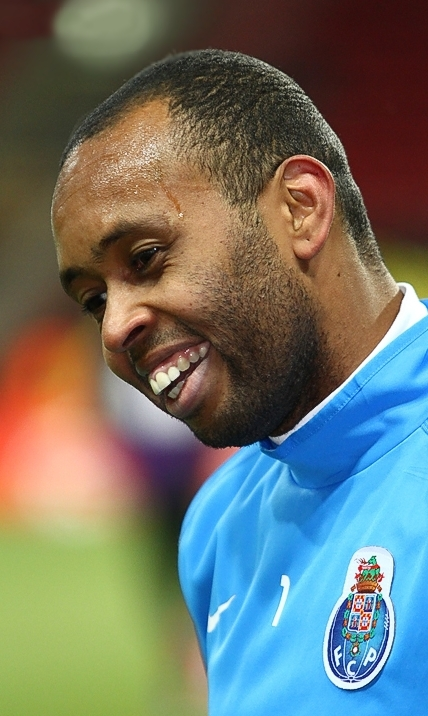
Helton appeared in more than 300 official games, winning eighteen major titles during his spell for the club.

Table of players, including playing position, club statistics and respective national team
Name	Pos	Club career	Apps	Goals	National team	Caps	Notes	Refs
Name	Pos	Club career	Total		National team	Caps	Notes	Refs
Valdemar Mota	FW	1926–1938	163	177	Portugal	21		
Álvaro Pereira	MF	1926–1936	137	7	Portugal	7		
Acácio Mesquita	FW	1926–1935; 1936–1937	101	111	Portugal	2		
Avelino Martins	DF	1927–1937; 1938–1939	133	0	Portugal	8		
Jerónimo Faria	DF	1927–1940	106	1	—	—		
Lopes Carneiro	FW	1930–1941	175	69	—	—		
Pinga	FW	1931–1946	331	314	Portugal	20		
Carlos Nunes	FW	1932–1942	178	129	Portugal	3		
Soares dos Reis	GK	1933–1940; 1942–1944	144	0	Portugal	4		
António Santos	FW	1934–1942	166	129	—	—		
Carlos Pereira	MF	1934–1941	198	12	Portugal	13		
Pocas	MF	1935–1947	291	4	Portugal	1		
Vítor Guilhar	DF	1936–1948	265	11	Portugal	2		
Gomes da Costa	DF	1936–1938; 1939–1947	127	62	Portugal	1		
António Baptista	MF	1937–1943	115	5	—	—		
Correia Dias	FW	1939–1940; 1941–1949	167	200	—	—		
Alfredo Pais	DF	1942–1952	267	2	—	—		
António Araújo	FW	1942–1949; 1950–1952	213	205	Portugal	9		
José Lourenço	FW	1942–1948	117	64	—	—		
Frederico Barrigana	GK	1943–1955	324	0	Portugal	12		
Romão	MF	1944–1952	180	7	—	—		
Joaquim Machado	DF	1945–1953; 1954–1955	218	23	Portugal	2		
Ângelo Carvalho	DF	1946–1955	249	1	Portugal	15		
Sanfins	FW	1946–1951	107	41	—	—		
Virgílio Mendes	DF	1947–1963	436	9	Portugal	39		
Carlos Vieira	FW	1948–1955	130	55	—	—		
Monteiro da Costa	FW	1949–1962	328	92	Portugal	4		
José Maria	FW	1949–1957	183	78	—	—		
Hernâni	FW	1950–1952; 1953–1964	332	187	Portugal	28		
Américo Lopes	GK	1952–1954; 1958–1969	255	0	Portugal	15		
Carlos Duarte	FW	1952–1964	228	94	Portugal	7		
António Teixeira	FW	1952–1962	220	171	Portugal	7		
José Maria Pedroto	MF	1952–1960	178	35	Portugal	16		
Fernando Perdigão	FW	1952–1963	128	35	Portugal	1		
Miguel Arcanjo	DF	1953–1965	316	0	Portugal	9		
Acúrsio Carrelo	GK	1955–1961	109	1	Portugal	8		
Barbosa	DF	1956–1962	130	1	Portugal	2		
Jaime Silva	FW	1959–1969	182	40	—	—		
António Paula	MF	1959–1966	164	2	—	—		
Custódio Pinto	MF	1961–1971	333	118	Portugal	13		
Rui Teixeira	GK	1961–1978	181	0	—	—		
Alberto Festa	DF	1961–1968	157	0	Portugal	19		
Francisco Nóbrega	FW	1962–1974	277	44	Portugal	4		
João Atraca	DF	1962–1969	158	3	—	—		
José Rolando	DF	1963–1975	305	6	Portugal	8		
João de Almeida	DF	1963–1969	100	0	—	—		
Valdemar	DF	1965–1974	230	5	—	—		
Pavão	MF	1965–1973	229	25	Portugal	6	(Note: Collapsed in the pitch during a league match, later dying at the hospital.)	
Eduardo Gomes	MF	1965–1971	100	5	—	—		
Djalma Freitas	FW	1966–1969	101	63	—	—		
Seninho	FW	1969–1972; 1974–1978	149	34	Portugal	4		
Manuel Gualter	DF	1969–1974	106	1	—	—		
António Oliveira	FW	1970–1980	250	85	Portugal	13		
Abel Miglietti	FW	1970–1975	148	76	Portugal	4		
Rodolfo Reis	MF	1971–1984	331	9	Portugal	6		
Tibi	GK	1972–1977; 1980–1981	129	0	Portugal	2		
Teófilo Cubillas	FW	1973–1977	108	65	Peru	11		
Fernando Gomes^{§}	FW	1974–1980; 1983–1989	455	347	Portugal	48	(Note: European Golden Shoe winner in 1982–83 and 1984–85.) (Note: Record all-time and league goalscorer.)	
Carlos Simões	DF	1974–1983	260	3	Portugal	13		
Gabriel Mendes	DF	1974–1983	250	6	Portugal	20		
Adelino Teixeira	DF	1974–1983	238	5	Portugal	12		
Alfredo Murça	DF	1974–1980	203	6	Portugal	4		
Octávio Machado	MF	1975–1978; 1979–1980	115	12	Portugal	10		
Fernando Freitas	DF	1976–1983	185	0	Portugal	2		
Duda	FW	1976–1981	148	53	—	—		
João Fonseca	GK	1977–1983	173	0	—	—		
António Frasco^{§}	MF	1978–1989	306	25	Portugal	23	(Note: Record number of titles in international club competitions.)	
António Lima Pereira^{§}	DF	1978–1989	264	12	Portugal	20		
José Costa	FW	1978–1985	199	32	Portugal	23		
António Sousa^{§}	MF	1979–1984; 1986–1989	309	78	Portugal	17		
Jaime Pacheco	MF	1979–1984; 1986–1989	206	19	Portugal	11		
Jaime Magalhães^{§}	MF	1980–1995	408	47	Portugal	20		
Mickey Walsh	FW	1980–1986	123	56	(Republic of Ireland) Rep. Ireland	13		
João Pinto^{§}	DF	1981–1997	587	20	Portugal	70	(Note: Record all-time and league appearances.)	
Augusto Inácio^{§}	DF	1982–1989	199	5	Portugal	21		
Zé Beto	GK	1982–1989	180	0	Portugal	3		
Eduardo Luís	DF	1982–1989	154	3	Portugal	7		
Eurico Gomes	DF	1982–1986	133	9	Portugal	18		
Vermelhinho	FW	1982–1987; 1988–1989	123	28	Portugal	2		
José Semedo	MF	1983–1996	313	47	Portugal	21		
António André^{§}	MF	1984–1995	382	27	Portugal	20		
Paulo Futre	FW	1984–1987	115	33	Portugal	12		
Rabah Madjer	FW	1985–1991	148	73	Algeria	n/a		
Fernando Bandeirinha	DF	1986–1996	170	9	—	—		
Domingos Paciência	FW	1987–1997; 1999–2001	378	144	Portugal	32		
Rui Barros	MF	1987–1988; 1994–2000	244	56	Portugal	6		
Fernando Couto	DF	1987–1988; 1990–1994	158	12	Portugal	21		
Geraldão	DF	1987–1991	128	23	Brazil	9		
Vítor Baía^{§}	GK	1988–1996; 1998–2007	566	0	Portugal	65	(Note: Record number of titles in all competitions.) (Note: Record appearances in international club competitions.) (Note: Record appearances in a season.)	
Paulo Pereira	DF	1988–1992; 1993–1994	125	19	—	—		
Jorge Couto	MF	1989–1996	181	18	Portugal	5		
Zé Carlos	DF	1989–1990; 1991–1996	102	26	—	—		
Aloísio ^{§}	DF	1990–2001	474	18	Brazil	6	(Note: Record appearances by a non-Portuguese player.)	
Emil Kostadinov	FW	1990–1995	168	60	Bulgaria	30		
António Folha	MF	1991–1992; 1993–2001	195	19	Portugal	26		
Jorge Costa^{§}	DF	1992–2005	383	25	Portugal	43		
Paulinho Santos	MF	1992–2003	316	8	Portugal	30		
Rui Jorge	DF	1992–1998	134	4	Portugal	2		
Ljubinko Drulović^{§}	FW	1993–2001	327	58	FR Yugoslavia	35		
Carlos Secretário	DF	1993–1996; 1997–2004	309	10	Portugal	31		
João Manuel Pinto	DF	1995–2000	109	12	—	—		
Mário Jardel	FW	1996–2000	175	168	Brazil	6	(Note: European Golden Shoe winner in 1998–99.)	
Zlatko Zahovič	MF	1996–1999	118	42	Slovenia	20		
Capucho	MF	1997–2003	275	42	Portugal	29		
Deco	MF	1998–2004	229	48	Portugal	19		
Ricardo Carvalho	DF	1998–1999; 2001–2004	117	4	Portugal	10		
Carlos Chaínho	MF	1998–2001	109	6	—	—		
Clayton	FW	1999–2003	117	26	—	—		
Dmitri Alenichev	MF	2000–2004	129	23	Russia	23		
Hélder Postiga	FW	2001–2003; 2004–2008	165	48	Portugal	15		
Costinha^{§}	MF	2001–2005	164	18	Portugal	27		
Ricardo Costa^{§}	DF	2001–2007	110	5	Portugal	6		
Benni McCarthy	FW	2001–2002; 2003–2006	125	56	South Africa	29		
Pedro Emanuel^{§}	DF	2002–2009	178	1	—	—		
Maniche^{§}	MF	2002–2005	124	22	Portugal	24		
José Bosingwa	MF	2003–2008	152	3	Portugal	7		
Ricardo Quaresma	FW	2004–2008; 2014–2015	225	50	Portugal	34		
Raul Meireles	MF	2004–2010	194	19	Portugal	38		
Pepe	DF	2004–2007; 2019–2024	290	17	Portugal	38		
Helton	GK	2005–2016	334	0	Brazil	3		
Lucho González	MF	2005–2009; 2012–2014	241	61	Argentina	23		
Bruno Alves	DF	2005–2010	174	17	Portugal	35		
Lisandro López	FW	2005–2009	150	63	Argentina	6		
Paulo Assunção	MF	2005–2008	103	0	—	—		
Jorge Fucile	DF	2006–2014	160	1	Uruguay	30		
Mariano González	FW	2007–2011	121	11	Argentina	1		
Fernando	MF	2008–2014	236	6	—	—		
Silvestre Varela	FW	2008–2014; 2015–2017	236	50	Portugal	27		
Rolando	DF	2008–2015	175	17	Portugal	10		
Hulk^{§}	FW	2008–2012	170	77	Brazil	14		
Fredy Guarín	MF	2008–2012	117	21	Colombia	17		
Cristian Rodríguez	FW	2008–2011	120	16	Uruguay	17		
Cristian Săpunaru	DF	2008–2012	103	3	Romania	7		
Sérgio Oliveira	MF	2009–2010; 2015–2022	174	39	Portugal	13		
Maicon	DF	2009–2016	190	13	—	—		
Álvaro Pereira	DF	2009–2012	119	3	Uruguay	16		
Fernando Belluschi	MF	2009–2012	113	9	Argentina	3		
João Moutinho^{§}	MF	2010–2013	140	10	Portugal	31		
Nicolás Otamendi	DF	2010–2014	125	10	Argentina	6		
James Rodríguez	MF	2010–2013	108	32	Colombia	12		
Danilo	DF	2011–2015	141	13	Brazil	11		
Alex Sandro	DF	2011–2015	137	3	Brazil	6		
Steven Defour	MF	2011–2014	113	7	Belgium	11		
Jackson Martínez	FW	2012–2015	136	92	Colombia	19		
Héctor Herrera	MF	2013–2019	245	35	Mexico	63		
Yacine Brahimi	FW	2014–2019	215	54	Algeria	40		
Iván Marcano	DF	2014–2018; 2019–	253	30	—	—		
Óliver Torres	MF	2014–2015; 2016–2019	146	12	—	—		
Otávio	MF	2014–2023	283	31	Portugal	14		
Vincent Aboubakar	FW	2014–2016; 2017–2020	125	58	Cameroon	26		
Jesús Corona	FW	2015–2022	287	31	Mexico	49		
Danilo Pereira	MF	2015–2020	202	19	Portugal	37		
Iker Casillas	GK	2015–2020	156	0	Spain	5		
Maxi Pereira	DF	2015–2019	130	5	Uruguay	21		
Alex Telles	DF	2016–2020	195	26	Brazil	1		
Moussa Marega	FW	2016–2021	191	72	Mali	13		
Felipe	DF	2016–2019	142	11	Brazil	1		
Tiquinho Soares	FW	2017–2020	140	64	—	—		
Galeno	FW	2017–2018; 2022–	144	45	Brazil	1		
Chancel Mbemba	DF	2018–2022	138	9	DR Congo	26		
Wilson Manafá	DF	2019–2023	130	2	—	—		
Luis Díaz	FW	2019–2022	125	41	Colombia	24		
Mateus Uribe	FW	2019–2023	176	15	Colombia	24		
Diogo Costa	GK	2019–	174	0	Portugal	32		
Marko Grujić	MF	2020–	140	4	Serbia	20		
Mehdi Taremi	FW	2020–2024	182	91	Iran	39		
Evanilson	FW	2020–2024	154	60	Brazil	2		
Toni Martínez	FW	2020–2024	140	32	—	—		
Zaidu Sanusi	DF	2020–	122	7	Nigeria	22		
João Mário	DF	2020–	156	5	Portugal	3		
Pepê	FW	2021–	167	24	Brazil	2		
Wendell	DF	2021–	109	7	Brazil	6		
Stephen Eustáquio	DF	2022–	114	12	Canada	29		
