= 1964 Taça de Portugal final =

- Event: 1963–64 Taça de Portugal
Benfica	Porto
6	2
- Date: 5 July 1964
- Venue: Estádio Nacional, Oeiras
- Referee: Rosa Nunes (Algarve)

The 1964 Taça de Portugal final was the final match of the 1963–64 Taça de Portugal, the 24th season of the Taça de Portugal, the premier Portuguese football cup competition organized by the Portuguese Football Federation (FPF). The match was played on 5 July 1964 at the Estádio Nacional in Oeiras, and opposed two Primeira Liga sides: Benfica and Porto. Benfica defeated Porto 6–2 to claim their twelfth Taça de Portugal.

== Match ==
=== Details ===
5 July 1964

Benfica	6–2	Porto
José Augusto 10', 12'; Eusébio 30' (pen.); Simões 48'; Serafim 71'; Torres 82'		Pinto 17'; Baptista 70'

Estádio Nacional, Oeiras
Referee: Rosa Nunes (Algarve)

Benfica	Porto

GK	1	(Portugal) Costa Pereira
DF		(Portugal) Germano
DF		(Portugal) Fernando Cruz
DF		(Portugal) Raúl Machado
MF		(Portugal) Domiciano Cavém
MF		(Portugal) Mário Coluna (c)
MF		(Portugal) António Simões
FW		(Portugal) Eusébio
FW		(Portugal) José Torres
FW		(Portugal) José Augusto
FW		(Portugal) Serafim Pereira
Substitutes:
Manager:
(Hungary) Lajos Czeizler

GK	1	(Portugal) Américo Lopes
DF		(Portugal) Alberto Festa
DF		(Portugal) António Paula
DF		(Portugal) João Almeida
MF		(Portugal) Carlos Baptista
MF		(Portugal) Joaquim Jorge
MF		(Portugal) Custódio Pinto
FW		(Portugal) Hernâni (c)
FW		(Brazil) Azumir Veríssimo
FW		(Portugal) Jaime Silva
FW		(Portugal) Francisco Nóbrega
Substitutes:
Manager:
(Brazil) Otto Glória

1963–64 Taça de Portugal Winners
Benfica
12th Title

Match officials

- Assistant referees:
- Fourth official:

Match rules

- 90 minutes.
- 30 minutes of extra time if necessary.

== See also ==
- O Clássico
