= 1959 Taça de Portugal final =

- Event: 1958–59 Taça de Portugal
Benfica	Porto
1	0
- Date: 19 July 1959
- Venue: Estádio Nacional, Oeiras
- Referee: Décio Freitas (Lisbon)

The 1959 Taça de Portugal final was the final match of the 1958–59 Taça de Portugal, the 19th season of the Taça de Portugal, the premier Portuguese football cup competition organized by the Portuguese Football Federation (FPF). The match was played on 19 July 1959 at the Estádio Nacional in Oeiras, and opposed two Primeira Liga sides: Benfica and Porto. Benfica defeated Porto 1–0 to claim a tenth Taça de Portugal.

== Match ==
=== Details ===
19 July 1959

Benfica	1–0	Porto
Cavém 1'

Estádio Nacional, Oeiras
Referee: Décio Freitas (Lisbon)

Benfica	Porto

GK	1	(Portugal) José de Bastos
DF		(Portugal) Manuel Serra
DF	3	(Portugal) Artur Santos (c)	(red card) 62'
DF		(Portugal) Mário João
MF		(Portugal) José Neto
MF		(Portugal) Francisco Palmeiro
MF	10	(Portugal) Joaquim Santana
MF		(Portugal) Alfredo Abrantes
MF	8	(Portugal) Mário Coluna
MF	11	(Portugal) Domiciano Cavém
FW	9	(Portugal) José Águas
Substitutes:
Manager:
(Argentina) José Valdivieso

GK	1	(Portugal) Acúrcio Carrelo
DF		(Portugal) António Barbosa
DF	6	(Portugal) Virgílio (c)
DF		(Portugal) Miguel Arcanjo
MF		(Brazil) Luís Roberto
MF		(Portugal) Monteiro da Costa
FW		(Portugal) Noé Castro
FW		(Portugal) Fernando Perdigão
FW		(Portugal) Hernâni
FW		(Portugal) Carlos Duarte	(red card) 62'
FW		(Portugal) António Teixeira
Substitutes:
Manager:
(Hungary) Béla Guttmann

1958–59 Taça de Portugal Winners
Benfica
10th Title

Match officials

- Assistant referees:
- Fourth official:

Match rules

- 90 minutes.
- 30 minutes of extra time if necessary.

== See also ==
- O Clássico
