= 1956 Taça de Portugal final =

- Event: 1955–66 Taça de Portugal
Porto	Torreense
2	0
- Date: 27 May 1956
- Venue: Estádio Nacional, Oeiras
- Referee: Hermínio Soares (Lisbon)

The 1956 Taça de Portugal final was the final match of the 1955–56 Taça de Portugal, the 16th season of the Taça de Portugal, the premier Portuguese football cup competition organized by the Portuguese Football Federation (FPF). The match was played on 27 May 1956 at the Estádio Nacional in Oeiras, and opposed two Primeira Liga sides: Porto and Torreense. Porto defeated Torreense 2–0 to claim their first Taça de Portugal.

== Match ==
=== Details ===
27 May 1956

Porto	2–0	Torreense
Hernâni 3', 57' (pen.)

Estádio Nacional, Oeiras
Referee: Hermínio Soares (Lisbon)

Porto	Torreense

GK	1	(Portugal) Manuel Pinho
DF		(Portugal) Miguel Arcanjo
DF		(Portugal) Osvaldo Cambalacho
DF		(Portugal) Virgílio
MF		(Brazil) Gastão Gonçalves
MF		(Portugal) José Maria Pedroto (c)
MF		(Portugal) Monteiro da Costa
FW		(Portugal) Carlos Duarte
FW		(Portugal) Fernando Perdigão
FW		(Brazil) Jaburú
FW		(Portugal) Hernâni
Substitutes:
Manager:
(Brazil) Dorival Knippel

GK	1	(Portugal) António Gama
DF		(Portugal) Joaquim Fernandes
DF		(Portugal) Amílar Silva (c)
MF		(Portugal) António Bernardo
MF		(Argentina) Américo Belen
MF		(Argentina) Juan Forneri
MF		(Portugal) Carlos Alberto
MF		(Portugal) José da Costa
FW		(Portugal) João Mendonça
FW		(Portugal) Fernando Mendonça
FW		(Portugal) José Gonçalves
Substitutes:
Manager:
(Argentina) Oscar Tellechea

1955–56 Taça de Portugal Winners
Porto
1st Title

Match officials

- Assistant referees:
- Fourth official:

Match rules

- 90 minutes.
- 30 minutes of extra time if necessary.
