= 1961 UEFA European Under-18 Championship =

Tournament details
- Host country: Portugal
- Dates: 30 March – 8 April
- Teams: 13

Final positions
- Champions: Portugal (1st title)
- Runners-up: Poland
- Third place: West Germany
- Fourth place: Spain

Tournament statistics
- Top scorer: Serafim (4 Goals)

The UEFA European Under-18 Championship 1961 Final Tournament was held in Portugal.

== Teams ==
The following teams entered the tournament:

- Austria
- Belgium
- England
- France
- West Germany
- Greece
- Italy
- Netherlands
- Poland
- Portugal (host)
- Romania
- Spain
- Turkey

== Group stage ==
=== Group A ===
Teams	Pld	W	D	L	GF	GA	GD	Pts
Portugal	2	1	1	0	4	0	+4	3
Italy	2	1	1	0	3	2	+1	3
England	2	0	0	2	2	7	–5	0

30 March 1961

Portugal	0 – 0	Italy
	Report

Estádio das Antas, Porto
Referee: Piet Roomer (Netherlands)

2 April 1961

Portugal	4 – 0	England
Simões 30'; Serafim 48', 56'; Nunes 68'	Report

Estádio José Alvalade, Lisbon
Referee: Kurt Tschenscher (Germany)

4 April 1961

Italy	3 – 2	England

=== Group B ===
Teams	Pld	W	D	L	GF	GA	GD	Pts
Spain	2	1	1	0	8	3	+5	3
Turkey	2	1	1	0	8	5	+3	3
Austria	2	0	0	2	4	12	–8	0

30 March 1961

Turkey	6 – 3	Austria
Tarhan 10', 50'; Doğan 22', 62'; Çevrim 35'; Ceyhun Güneş 60'	Report	Wunicer 9'; Baumgartner 25' (pen.); Kumpfer 65'

Estádio do Restelo, Lisbon
Attendance: 2,000
Referee: Mihai Popa (Romania)
1 April 1961

Turkey	2 – 2	Spain
Doğan 35'; Ceyhun Güneş 46'	Report	Moyano 39', 52'

Estádio do Restelo, Lisbon
Attendance: 10,000
4 April 1961

Spain	6 – 1	Austria
Goal		Goal

Coimbra

=== Group C ===
Teams	Pld	W	D	L	GF	GA	GD	Pts
West Germany	3	2	1	0	7	0	+7	5
Romania	3	2	1	0	4	1	+3	5
Netherlands	3	0	1	2	2	7	–5	1
Belgium	3	0	1	2	1	6	–5	1

30 March	West Germany	4–0	Belgium
	Romania	3–1	Netherlands
1 April	Belgium	1–1	Netherlands
2 April	West Germany	0–0	Romania
4 April	West Germany	3–0	Netherlands
	Romania	1–0	Belgium

=== Group D ===
Teams	Pld	W	D	L	GF	GA	GD	Pts
Poland	2	1	1	0	6	3	+3	3
France	2	1	0	1	4	6	–2	2
Greece	2	0	1	1	4	5	–1	1

30 March	Poland	4–1	France
2 April	France	3–2	Greece
4 April	Poland	2–2	Greece

=== Friendlies ===
Three Friendly Matches were also played during the tournament.

30 March	Spain	0–0	England	Sir Stanley Rous Cup
2 April	Poland	3–0	Austria	José Crahay Cup
4 April	Portugal	3–1	France	Ebbe Schwartz Cup

== Semifinals ==
6 April 1961

Portugal	4 – 1	Spain

Lisbon
6 April 1961

Poland	2 – 1	West Germany

Porto

== Third place match ==
8 April 1961

West Germany	2 – 1	Spain

Lisbon

== Final ==
8 April 1961

Portugal	4 – 0	Poland
Serafim 9', 27', 49', 78'

Lisbon

1961 UEFA European Under-18 Championship

Portugal
First title
