= 1963–64 Taça de Portugal =

Tournament details
- Country: Portugal
- Dates: 22 September 1963 to 5 July 1964

Final positions
- Champions: Benfica (12th title)
- Runners-up: Porto

Tournament statistics
- Matches played: 86
- Goals scored: 346 (4.02 per match)
- Top goal scorer(s): Eusébio (14 goals)

The 1963–64 Taça de Portugal was the 24th edition of the Taça de Portugal, a Portuguese football knockout tournament organized by the Portuguese Football Federation (FPF). The 1963–64 Taça de Portugal began on 22 September 1963. The final was played on 5 July 1964 at the Estádio Nacional, where Benfica beat FC Porto 6–2 to win their 12th title.

Sporting CP were the previous holders, having defeated Vitória de Guimarães 4–0 in the previous season's final. Defending champions Sporting CP were eliminated in the third round by Vitória de Setúbal. Benfica defeated Porto, 6–2 in the final to win their twelfth Taça de Portugal.

== First round ==
Teams from the Primeira Liga (I) and the Portuguese Second Division (II) entered at this stage. Each side would contest a second round place by playing two matches: one home and one away match. In case the aggregate score after the two games was level, the cup tie would be replayed.

Team 1	Agg.	Team 2	1st leg	2nd leg	3rd leg
Académica de Coimbra (I)	6 – 1	Leça (II)	6 – 1	0 – 0	
Alhandra (II)	4 – 9	Sporting CP (I)	3 – 5	1 – 4	
Barreirense (I)	2 – 4	Atlético CP (II)	1 – 1	1 – 1	0 – 2
Beira-Mar (II)	5 – 2	Sanjoanense (II)	3 – 0	2 – 2	
Belenenses (I)	5 – 3	Peniche (II)	3 – 2	2 – 1	
Boavista (II)	8 – 4	Desportivo de Beja (II)	4 – 2	4 – 2	
Famalicão (II)	5 – 4	Sacavenense (II)	2 – 1	3 – 3	
Leões Santarém (II)	1 – 10	Porto (I)	0 – 7	1 – 3	
Lusitano FCV (II)	2 – 9	Braga (II)	2 – 5	0 – 4	
Luso (II)	1 – 12	Benfica (I)	0 – 6	1 – 6	
Marinhense (II)	2 – 1	Sporting de Espinho (II)	0 – 0	2 – 1	
Montijo (II)	6 – 4	Torreense (II)	4 – 2	2 – 2	
Olhanense (I)	1 – 2	Fabril Barreiro (I)	0 – 0	1 – 2	
Oliveirense (II)	1 – 5	Farense (II)	1 – 1	0 – 4	
Oriental (II)	0 – 8	Lusitano de Évora (I)	0 – 2	0 – 6	
Portimonense (II)	0 – 8	Leixões (I)	0 – 2	0 – 6	
Salgueiros (II)	3 – 2	Feirense (II)	2 – 0	1 – 2	
Sporting da Covilhã (II)	4 – 5	Vitória de Setúbal (I)	2 – 3	2 – 2	
Varzim (I)	6 – 4	Cova da Piedade (II)	2 – 1	1 – 2	3 – 1
Vianense (II)	5 – 1	Lusitano VRSA (II)	5 – 0	0 – 1	
Vitória de Guimarães (I)	10 – 0	Seixal (I)	6 – 0	4 – 0	

== Second round ==
Due to the odd number of teams involved at this stage of the competition, Sporting CP qualified for the next round due to having no opponent to face at this stage of the competition.

Team 1	Agg.	Team 2	1st leg	2nd leg
Atlético CP (II)	1 – 10	Lusitano de Évora (I)	1 – 4	0 – 6
Beira-Mar (II)	0 – 4	Belenenses (I)	0 – 1	0 – 3
Fabril Barreiro (I)	6 – 4	Braga (II)	6 – 1	0 – 3
Leixões (I)	3 – 6	Porto (I)	3 – 2	0 – 4
Montijo (II)	2 – 1	Famalicão (II)	1 – 1	1 – 0
Salgueiros (II)	5 – 2	Farense (II)	4 – 1	1 – 1
Varzim (I)	1 – 0	Académica de Coimbra (I)	1 – 0	0 – 0
Vianense (II)	1 – 17	Benfica (I)	1 – 8	0 – 9
Vitória de Guimarães (I)	6 – 2	Marinhense (II)	5 – 0	1 – 2
Vitória de Setúbal (I)	5 – 3	Boavista (II)	3 – 1	2 – 2

== Third round ==
Due to the odd number of teams involved at this stage of the competition, Lusitano de Évora qualified for the next round due to having no opponent to face at this stage of the competition.

Team 1	Agg.	Team 2	1st leg	2nd leg	3rd leg
Fabril Barreiro (I)	6 – 4	Varzim (I)	5 – 2	1 – 2	
Montijo (II)	1 – 10	Belenenses (I)	1 – 3	0 – 7	
Porto (I)	5 – 2	Vitória de Guimarães (I)	3 – 1	2 – 1	
Salgueiros (II)	2 – 4	Benfica (I)	1 – 1	1 – 3	
Vitória de Setúbal (I)	3 – 2	Sporting CP (I)	2 – 2	0 – 0	1 – 0

== Quarter-finals ==
Due to the odd number of teams who progressed to the quarter final stage of the competition, Mozambican side Ferroviário de Maputo and Lusitânia were invited to participate in the competition.

Team 1	Agg.	Team 2	1st leg	2nd leg
Ferroviário de Maputo (N/A)	3 – 5	Lusitânia (N/A)	1 – 3	2 – 2
Lusitano de Évora (I)	2 – 11	Benfica (I)	1 – 8	1 – 3
Vitória de Setúbal (I)	1 – 4	Belenenses (I)	1 – 2	0 – 2
Porto (I)	9 – 3	Fabril Barreiro (I)	6 – 1	3 – 2

== Semi-finals ==
Lusitânia forfeited their semi-final tie against Porto, who could not make the away trip to Angra, which led to the Dragões progressing to the final.

Team 1	Agg.	Team 2	1st leg	2nd leg
Benfica (I)	6 – 1	Belenenses (I)	3 – 1	3 – 0
Porto (I)	WO	Lusitânia (N/A)		

== Final ==
5 July 1964

Benfica	6–2	Porto
José Augusto 10', 12'; Eusébio 30' (pen.); Simões 48'; Serafim 71'; Torres 82'		Pinto 17'; Baptista 70'

Estádio Nacional, Oeiras
Referee: Rosa Nunes (Algarve)
