= José Valdivieso =

Argentine footballer and manager

Personal information
- Full name: José Alberto Valdivieso Tetamanti
- Date of birth: 21 June 1921
- Place of birth: San Martín, Mendoza, Argentina
- Date of death: 8 April 1996 (aged 74)
- Position: Defender

Senior career*
Years	Team	Apps	(Gls)
1945–1949	Atlético Madrid	25	(2)

Managerial career
- 1954: Benfica
- 1959: Benfica
- 1964: Deportivo Galicia
- * Club domestic league appearances and goals

José Alberto Valdivieso Tetamanti (21 June 1921 – 8 April 1996) was an Argentine defender which played for Atlético Madrid from 1945 to 1949.

== Career ==
Born in San Martín, Mendoza, Valdvieso defended Atlético Madrid colours in four seasons, amassing 25 league caps, scoring twice. He was part of the squad that finished third in the 1946-47 La Liga, after being joint-first all throughout the season. On the last day Athletic Bilbao draws three equal, Atletico loses 2–3 against Real Madrid, wasting a two-nill advantage, and Valencia wins six-nill against Sporting de Gijón, being proclaimed Champion. He did win some silverware at the Colchoneros, helping the club conquer the Copa Presidente de la Federación Española, against Valência on 14 September 1947.

After retiring in 1953, he moved to Portugal and joined Benfica as a youth coach, having two spells on the first team. He assumed the role for the first time on 4 January 1954, after Ribeiro dos Reis left the position, finishing the season in third place, behind both rivals. His second spell was on 19 June 1959, Valdevieso replaced Otto Glória for just one game, in a one-nill win against FC Porto on the 1959 Taça de Portugal Final.

He later moved to Australia, managing Canterbury in the suburbs of Sydney. In 1964 he led Deportivo Galicia in the Venezuelan Primera División to their first league title in 1964.

== Managerial statistics ==
Team	From	To	Record				
Team	From	To	G	W	D	L	Win %
Benfica	4 January 1954	31 May 1954	19	8	3	8	42.11
Benfica	19 June 1959		1	1	0	0	100

== Honours ==
Benfica

- Taça de Portugal: 1958-59

Deportivo Galicia

- Venezuelan Primera División: 1964
