= Domingos Lucas Naftal =

Mozambican footballer (1941–2026)

Personal information
- Full name: Domingos Lucas Naftal
- Date of birth: 23 April 1941
- Place of birth: Portuguese East Africa
- Date of death: 9 April 2026 (aged 84)
- Place of death: Canada
- Position: Forward

Youth career
- 1962–1964: Porto

Senior career*
Years	Team	Apps	(Gls)
1964–1966	Porto	17	(8)
1966–1967	Vitória Guimarães	5	(0)
1967–1968	Tirsense	23	(5)
1968–1969	Covilhã		
1969–1970	Espinho		
1970–1972	Marinhense		
1972–1973	Vilanovense		
1973–1974	Aliados Lordelo		
1975	Ottawa Tigers		
- * Club domestic league appearances and goals

Domingos Lucas Naftal (23 April 1941 – 9 April 2026) was a Mozambican footballer who played as a forward.

== Career ==
Naftal began playing at the youth level with Porto in 1962. In 1964, he was with Porto's first team in the Primeira Divisão. In his debut season with Porto he contributed a goal against Benfica in the O Clássico. After two seasons with Porto he signed with Vitória Guimarães, and later played with Tirsense. In 1968, he played in the Segunda Divisão with Covilhã, and the following season he signed with Espinho.

He signed with Marinhense in 1970 and played two seasons with the club. In 1972, he played with Vilanovense, and later with Aliados Lordelo. In 1975, he played abroad in the Canadian National Soccer League with Ottawa Tigers.

== Death ==
Naftal died in Canada on 9 April 2026, at the age of 84.
