= Américo Lopes =

Portuguese footballer (1933–2023)

Américo
Personal information
- Full name: Américo Ferreira Lopes
- Date of birth: 6 March 1933
- Place of birth: Santa Maria de Lamas, Portugal
- Date of death: 22 September 2023 (aged 90)
- Place of death: Portugal
- Height: 1.84 m (6 ft 0 in)
- Position: Goalkeeper

Youth career
- 1949–1952: Porto

Senior career*
Years	Team	Apps	(Gls)
1952–1969	Porto	192	(0)
1954–1958	→ Boavista (loan)		

International career
1964–1968	Portugal	15	(0)
Medal record
Men's football
Representing Portugal
FIFA World Cup
Third place	1966 England
- * Club domestic league appearances and goals

Américo Ferreira Lopes (6 March 1933 – 22 September 2023), known mononymously as Américo, was a Portuguese footballer who played as a goalkeeper.

== Club career ==
Born in Santa Maria de Lamas, Aveiro District, Américo spent the vast majority of his professional career with FC Porto, competing 13 seasons in the Primeira Liga and appearing in 250 official matches. With his main club, he won the 1959 national championship and the 1968 Taça de Portugal.

From 1954 to 1958, Américo was loaned to neighbouring Boavista FC, playing his last three years in the Segunda Liga. He retired in June 1969, aged 36.

== International career ==
Américo made his debut for the Portugal national team on 29 April 1964, in a 3–2 friendly away win over Switzerland. He was selected by manager Otto Glória for his 1966 FIFA World Cup squad, but remained unused for the third-placed side.

Américo earned the last of his 15 caps on 11 December 1968, in a 4–2 loss in Greece for the 1970 World Cup qualifiers.

== Death ==
Américo died on 22 September 2023, at the age of 90.

== Honours ==
Porto

- Primeira Liga: 1958–59
- Taça de Portugal: 1967–68
