= Costuras =

Portuguese footballer

José Monteiro (23 October 1913 – unknown), commonly known as Costuras, was a professional football player.

During his career he played in F.C. Porto, and in the season of 1938–39 he was the top scorer of the championship, with 18 goals.

He is referenced as a Legendary player of F.C. Porto in FIFA.com's classic football section.
