= António Teixeira (footballer, born 1930) =

Portuguese footballer

Personal information
- Full name: António Dias Teixeira
- Date of birth: 16 September 1930
- Place of birth: Lisbon, Portugal
- Date of death: 17 October 2003 (aged 73)
- Place of death: Porto, Portugal
- Height: 1.71 m (5 ft 7 in)
- Position: Forward

Youth career
- 1948–1949: Benfica

Senior career*
Years	Team	Apps	(Gls)
1949–1951	Benfica	7	(5)
1951–1952	Vitória Guimarães	25	(17)
1952–1962	Porto	173	(125)
1964–1965	Braga	16	(8)
Total		221	(155)

International career
1957–1959	Portugal	7	(1)

Managerial career
- 1964–1965: Braga
- 1967–1968: Leixões
- 1969–1970: Leixões
- 1971: Porto
- 1971–1972: Boavista
- 1972–1974: Leixões
- 1975–1980: Varzim
- 1980: Boavista
- 1980–1981: Académico Viseu
- 1981–1982: Varzim
- 1982: Marítimo
- 1983–1984: Famalicão
- 1985–1986: Leixões
- * Club domestic league appearances and goals

António Dias Teixeira (16 September 1930 – 17 October 2003) was a Portuguese footballer and later manager.

== Honours ==
=== Player ===
Benfica

- Primeira Divisão: 1949–50

Porto

- Primeira Divisão: 1955–56, 1958–59
- Taça de Portugal: 1955–56, 1957–58

Individual

- Taça de Portugal Top Scorer: 1955–56

=== Manager ===
Varzim

- Segunda Divisão: 1975–76
