= Pavão (footballer, born 1947) =

Portuguese footballer

Personal information
- Full name: Fernando Pascoal Neves
- Date of birth: 12 August 1947
- Place of birth: Chaves, Portugal
- Date of death: 16 December 1973 (aged 26)
- Place of death: Porto, Portugal
- Height: 1.73 m (5 ft 8 in)
- Position: Midfielder

Youth career
- 1959–1964: Chaves
- 1964–1965: Porto

Senior career*
Years	Team	Apps	(Gls)
1965–1973	Porto	179	(16)

International career
1965	Portugal U18	2	(1)
1966–1967	Portugal U21	4	(0)
1968–1973	Portugal	6	(0)
- * Club domestic league appearances and goals

Fernando Pascoal Neves (12 July 1947 – 16 December 1973), commonly known as Pavão, was a Portuguese footballer who played as a central midfielder for FC Porto in the Primeira Liga.

== Career ==
Born in Chaves, Pavão began playing football in his local team Chaves. In 1964 he entered Porto's youth academy and after one season, joined the senior team eventually playing for the club his entire professional career.

In December 1973, he collapsed after completing a pass during the 13th minute of a league match against Vitória Setúbal at Estádio das Antas, dying of a heart attack at age 26.

== Honours ==
Porto

- Taça de Portugal: 1967–68
