= Candan Tarhan =

Turkish football manager (1942–1989)

Personal information
- Date of birth: 26 June 1942
- Place of birth: Gaziantep, Turkey
- Date of death: 18 April 1989 (aged 46)

Managerial career
- Years: Team
- 1974–1977: Turkey U21
- 1977–1978: Turkey (assistant)
- 1978–1980: Altay
- 1980–1982: Zonguldakspor
- 1982: Turkey U21
- 1982–1983: Altay
- 1983–1984: Karşıyaka
- 1984: Turkey
- 1984–1986: Sarıyer
- 1986–1987: Bakırköyspor
- 1987–1988: Sarıyer
- 1988–1989: Kuşadasıspor

Candan Tarhan (26 June 1942 – 18 April 1989) was a Turkish football manager. He managed the Turkish national team.
