= Valdemar Mota =

Portuguese footballer

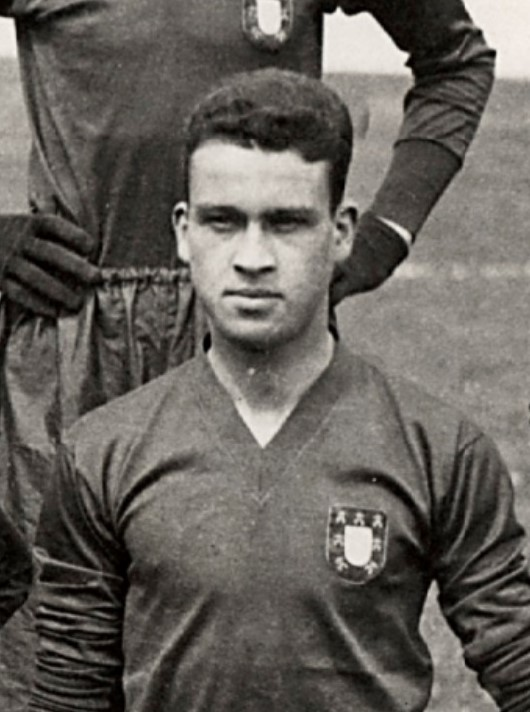
- Valdemar Mota in 1928

Personal information
- Date of birth: 18 March 1906
- Place of birth: Porto, Portugal
- Date of death: April 1966 (aged 60)
- Position: Midfielder

Senior career*
Years	Team	Apps	(Gls)
1926–1937	F.C. Porto		

International career
1928–1936	Portugal	21	(4)
- * Club domestic league appearances and goals

Waldemar Mota da Fonseca (18 March 1906 – April 1966), known as Valdemar Mota, was a Portuguese footballer who played as a midfielder and forward for FC Porto. He was born in Porto.

== International career ==
Valdemar Mota played 21 games and scored 4 goals for the Portugal national team. He made his debut 8 January 1928 in a 2–2 draw against Spain, and was playing for Portugal in the 1928 Football Olympic Tournament. He scored 1 goal in Portugal's first game against Chile in a 4–2 victory in Amsterdam.

Appearances and goals by national team and year
National team	Year	Apps	Goals
Portugal	1928	7	4
Portugal	1929	2	0
Portugal	1930	4	0
Portugal	1931	2	0
Portugal	1932	1	0
Portugal	1933	2	0
Portugal	1934	2	0
Portugal	1936	1	0
Total		21	4

Scores and results list Portugal's goal tally first, score column indicates score after each Mota goal.

List of international goals scored by Valdemar Mota
No.	Date	Venue	Opponent	Score	Result	Competition	Ref.
1	15 April 1928	Campo do Ameal, Porto, Portugal	Italy	1–0	4–1	Friendly	
2	15 April 1928	Campo do Ameal, Porto, Portugal	Italy	2–0	4–1	Friendly	
3	15 April 1928	Campo do Ameal, Porto, Portugal	Italy	4–1	4–1	Friendly	
4	27 May 1928	Olympic Stadium, Amsterdam, Netherlands	Chile	4–2	4–2	1928 Summer Olympics	
