= Vítor Guilhar =

Portuguese footballer (born 1913)

Personal information
- Full name: Vítor Augusto da Veiga Guilhar
- Date of birth: 12 October 1913
- Place of birth: São Tomé, São Tomé and Príncipe
- Date of death: unknown
- Position: Defender

Senior career*
Years	Team	Apps	(Gls)
1937–1938	Boavista		
1938–1940	FC Porto	26	(0)

International career
1941	Portugal	2	(0)
- * Club domestic league appearances and goals

Vítor Augusto da Veiga Guilhar (born 12 October 1913, date of death unknown) was a Portuguese footballer who played as defender.
