= Joaquim Jorge (footballer) =

Portuguese footballer

Personal information
- Full name: Joaquim António Jorge
- Date of birth: 18 February 1939 (age 87)
- Place of birth: Maputo, Mozambique
- Position: Central defender

Senior career*
Years	Team	Apps	(Gls)
1959–1962	Sporting Beira		
1962–1965	FC Porto	39	(4)
1965–1972	Vitória Guimarães	141	(4)

International career
1969	Portugal	2	(0)
- * Club domestic league appearances and goals

Joaquim António Jorge (born 18 February 1939 in Maputo) is a former Portuguese footballer who played as a defender.
