= Frederico Barrigana =

Portuguese footballer

- Barrigana (right)

Personal information
- Full name: Frederico Barrigana
- Date of birth: 28 April 1922
- Place of birth: Alcochete, Portugal
- Date of death: 30 September 2007 (aged 85)
- Place of death: Águeda, Portugal
- Position: Goalkeeper

Youth career
- 1939–1942: Onze Unidos

Senior career*
Years	Team	Apps	(Gls)
1942–1943	Sporting CP	0	(0)
1943–1956	Porto	260	(0)
1956–1958	Salgueiros	22	(0)
1964–1965	Académico Viseu		
Total		282	(0)

International career
1948–1954	Portugal	12	(0)
- * Club domestic league appearances and goals

Frederico Barrigana (28 April 1922 – 30 September 2007) was a Portuguese footballer who played as a goalkeeper.

He spent the vast majority of his career with Porto, where he earned the nickname "Mãos de Ferro" (Iron Hands) and appeared in 296 competitive matches. He was chosen by Portuguese sports newspaper Record as one of the best 100 Portuguese football players ever.

== Club career ==
Born in Alcochete, Setúbal District, Barrigana started his senior career with Sporting CP, but did not play any games during his spell in Lisbon as he was barred by legendary João Azevedo. Afterwards, FC Porto's goalkeeper, Hungarian Bela Andrasik, mysteriously disappeared (it was later found out he was an anti-nazi spy who left the country in fear of António de Oliveira Salazar's regime); the club requested that Barrigana be loaned to them, and Sporting obliged.

Shortly after the arrival of Brazilian Dorival Yustrich, the 34-year-old Barrigana was deemed surplus to requirements and released. He then signed with S.C. Salgueiros of the Segunda Liga, retiring after two seasons.

== International career ==
Barrigana made his debut for the Portugal national team on 21 March 1948, in a 2–0 friendly defeat against Spain in Madrid. Over six years, he won a further 11 caps.

== Death ==
Barrigana died on 30 September 2007 in Águeda at the age of 85, after not being able to overcome a pulmonary infection.
