= Virgílio Mendes =

Portuguese footballer

Personal information
- Full name: Virgílio Marques Mendes
- Date of birth: 17 November 1927
- Place of birth: Entroncamento, Portugal
- Date of death: 24 April 2009 (aged 82)
- Place of death: Porto, Portugal
- Height: 1.73 m (5 ft 8 in)
- Position: Right back

Youth career
- 1943–1946: Ferroviários
- 1946–1947: Porto

Senior career*
Years	Team	Apps	(Gls)
1947–1962	Porto	346	(5)

International career
1949–1960	Portugal	39	(0)

Managerial career
- 1966: Porto
- 1979–1980: Mirandela
- * Club domestic league appearances and goals

Virgílio Marques Mendes (17 November 1926 – 24 April 2009) was a Portuguese professional footballer, noticed as a leading figure of FC Porto and the Portugal national team during the 1950s.

== Career ==
He won the national Primeira Divisão championship title twice with FC Porto, in the 1955–56 and 1958–59 seasons. For the national team, Virgílio debuted in a friendly 1–4 loss to Italy on 27 February 1949, in a game that earned him the nickname of "O Leão de Génova" (The Lion of Genoa), for whom he would be known for the rest of his career.

He was a constant figure in the national team for the next 11 years, and he played in the 1950, 1954 and 1958 World Cup qualification. The last one is remembered for the historical 3–0 win over Italy, which ultimately resulted in the Italians missing the 1958 FIFA World Cup to Northern Ireland, the only time the Italians have missed a World Cup tournament. Virgílio's last game came at age 33, in the Euro 1960 1–5 quarter-final loss to Yugoslavia, on 22 May 1960. That would be his 39th cap for the national team, which made Virgílio the most capped Portuguese football player of his time.

He coached FC Porto for a brief period in 1966 as a caretaker, when he succeeded Flávio Costa in his second stint with the club. He also managed SC Mirandela in the 1979–80 season, leading the team to the first place of the Terceira Divisão – Série A.

== Career statistics ==
=== Club ===
Appearances and goals by club, season and competition.

Club	Season	League			Cup (Note: Includes the Taça de Portugal)		Europe		Total	
Club	Season	Division	Apps	Goals	Apps	Goals	Apps	Goals	Apps	Goals
Porto	1947–48	Primeira Divisão	17	1	1	0	—		18	1
Porto	1948–49	Primeira Divisão	20	1	3	0	—		23	1
Porto	1949–50	Primeira Divisão	22	1	0	0	—		22	1
Porto	1950–51	Primeira Divisão	26	0	4	0	—		30	0
Porto	1951–52	Primeira Divisão	24	0	7	0	—		31	0
Porto	1952–53	Primeira Divisão	19	0	7	0	—		26	0
Porto	1953–54	Primeira Divisão	25	0	4	0	—		29	0
Porto	1954–55	Primeira Divisão	26	0	2	0	—		28	0
Porto	1955–56	Primeira Divisão	26	0	5	0	—		31	0
Porto	1956–57	Primeira Divisão	26	0	4	0	2 (Note: Appearances in European Cup)	0	32	0
Porto	1957–58	Primeira Divisão	19	0	9	0	—		28	0
Porto	1958–59	Primeira Divisão	20	1	9	1	—		29	2
Porto	1959–60	Primeira Divisão	24	0	9	0	2	0	35	0
Porto	1960–61	Primeira Divisão	26	1	11	0	—		37	1
Porto	1961–62	Primeira Divisão	26	0	6	0	—		32	0
Porto	1962–63	Primeira Divisão	0	0	4	0	1 (Note: Appearance in Inter-Cities Fairs Cup)	0	5	0
Career Total			346	5	85	1	5	0	436	6

== Honours ==
=== Player ===
Porto

- Primeira Divisão: 1955–56, 1958–59
- Taça de Portugal: 1955–56, 1957–58

=== Manager ===
Mirandela

- Terceira Divisão – Série A: 1979–80

== See also ==
- List of one-club men
