= Azumir Veríssimo =

Brazilian footballer (1935–2012)

Personal information
- Full name: Azumir Luis Casimiro Veríssimo
- Date of birth: 7 July 1935
- Place of birth: Rio de Janeiro, Brazil
- Position(s): Forward

Senior career*
Years	Team	Apps	(Gls)
1958-1960	Madureira		
1961	Vasco da Gama		
1961	Madureira		
1961–1964	Porto	54	(57)
1965–1965	Sporting da Covilha		
1965–1967	CUF Barreiro		
1967–1968	C.D. Beja		
- *Club domestic league appearances and goals

Azumir Luis Casimiro Veríssimo, or just Azumir (7 June 1935 – 2 December 2012) was a Brazilian professional footballer who played as a forward.

== Career ==
Azumir was born in Rio de Janeiro. Heplayed in Brazil for Madureira Atlético Clube and CR Vasco da Gama (just in January 1961 on a loan arrangement), before signing for Portuguese Liga side Porto. He played for Porto during the Portuguese league of 1961–62, in which he was the top goal-scorer with 23 goals. He also played in Portugal for Desportivo de Beja, Barreirense, Sporting da Covilhã and FC Tirsense.
