= 1967–68 Taça de Portugal =

Tournament details
- Country: Portugal
- Dates: 8 October 1967 – 16 June 1968
- Teams: 47

Final positions
- Champions: Porto (3rd title)
- Runners-up: Vitória de Setúbal

Tournament statistics
- Matches played: 88
- Goals scored: 295 (3.35 per match)
- Top goal scorer(s): Djalma (11 goals)

The 1967–68 Taça de Portugal was the 28th edition of the Portuguese football knockout tournament, organized by the Portuguese Football Federation (FPF). The 1967–68 Taça de Portugal began on 8 October 1967. The final was played on 16 June 1968 at the Estádio Nacional.

Vitória de Setúbal were the previous holders, having defeated Académica de Coimbra 3–2 in the previous season's final. Defending champions Vitória de Setúbal were unable to regain the Taça de Portugal as they were defeated in the final by Porto who claimed their third Taça de Portugal.

== First round ==
Ties were played between the 8–15 October. Cup ties which ended in a tied aggregate score were replayed at a later date. Teams from the Primeira Liga (I) and the Portuguese Second Division (II) entered at this stage.

Team 1	Agg.	Team 2	1st leg	2nd leg	3rd leg
Académica de Coimbra (I)	10 – 2	Torres Novas (II)	4 – 0	6 – 2	
Almada (II)	5 – 6	Académico de Viseu (II)	3 – 1	2 – 5	
Atlético CP (II)	1 – 2	Sanjoanense (I)	1 – 0	0 – 2	
Fabril Barreiro (I)	2 – 4	Sporting CP (I)	1 – 1	1 – 3	
Famalicão (II)	2 – 8	Braga (I)	1 – 3	1 – 5	
Leça (II)	4 – 1	Alhandra (II)	1 – 0	3 – 1	
Leixões (I)	9 – 4	União de Tomar (II)	7 – 0	2 – 4	
Lusitano de Évora (II)	3 – 4	Gouveia (II)	2 – 2	1 – 2	
Montijo (II)	1 – 13	Benfica (I)	1 – 4	0 – 9	
Oriental (II)	2 – 5	Cova da Piedade (II)	2 – 4	0 – 1	
Peniche (II)	1 – 3	Sporting da Covilhã (II)	1 – 2	0 – 1	
Portimonense (II)	1 – 8	Belenenses (I)	0 – 4	1 – 4	
Porto (I)	4 – 1	Beira-Mar (II)	2 – 1	2 – 0	
Sesimbra (II)	2 – 6	Barreirense (I)	1 – 3	1 – 3	
Torreense (II)	3 – 2	Luso (II)	2 – 1	0 – 1	
Tramagal (II)	3 – 4	Sintrense (II)	1 – 2	2 – 2	
União de Lamas (II)	4 – 5	Penafiel (II)	2 – 3	2 – 1	0 – 1
Varzim (I)	6 – 4	Sporting de Espinho (II)	2 – 2	1 – 1	3 – 1
Vitória de Guimarães (I)	12 – 1	Olhanense (II)	9 – 1	3 – 0	
Vitória de Setúbal (I)	6 – 1	Salgueiros (II)	5 – 0	1 – 1	
Vizela (II)	2 – 3	Tirsense (I)	1 – 2	1 – 1	

== Second round ==
Ties were played between the 21–31 January. Due to the odd number of teams involved at this stage of the competition, Benfica qualified for the next round due to having no opponent to face at this stage of the competition.

Team 1	Agg.	Team 2	1st leg	2nd leg	3rd leg
Académico de Viseu (II)	1 – 4	Vitória de Guimarães (I)	0 – 1	1 – 3	
Barreirense (I)	1 – 0	Cova da Piedade (II)	1 – 0	0 – 0	
Belenenses (I)	5 – 1	Sintrense (II)	3 – 1	2 – 0	
Braga (I)	2 – 1	Leça (II)	0 – 0	2 – 1	
Leixões (I)	3 – 1	Torreense (II)	2 – 0	1 – 1	
Penafiel (II)	1 – 3	Sanjoanense (I)	1 – 2	0 – 1	
Sporting da Covilhã (II)	7 – 3	Gouveia (II)	4 – 0	3 – 3	
Tirsense (I)	3 – 6	Académica de Coimbra (I)	3 – 1	0 – 5	
Varzim (I)	1 – 9	Porto (I)	0 – 4	1 – 5	
Vitória de Setúbal (I)	4 – 3	Sporting CP (I)	1 – 1	2 – 2	1 – 0

== Third round ==
Ties were played between the 17–24 May. Club sides Lusitânia and Marítimo as well as the Angolan, Bissau-Guinean and Mozambican national teams were invited to participate in the competition.

Team 1	Agg.	Team 2	1st leg	2nd leg
Barreirense (I)	WO	Guinea-Bissau (N/A)		
Belenenses (I)	4 – 1	Braga (I)	2 – 1	2 – 0
Benfica (I)	4 – 2	Sanjoanense (I)	2 – 1	2 – 1
Leixões (I)	WO	Angola (N/A)		
Lusitânia (N/A)	1 – 4	Marítimo (N/A)	1 – 1	0 – 3
Sporting da Covilhã (II)	1 – 9	Porto (I)	0 – 4	1 – 5
Vitória de Guimarães (I)	WO	Mozambique (N/A)		
Vitória de Setúbal (I)	3 – 0	Académica de Coimbra (I)	2 – 0	1 – 0

== Quarter-finals ==
Ties were played on the 19–26 May.

Team 1	Agg.	Team 2	1st leg	2nd leg
Barreirense (I)	5 – 3	Benfica (I)	2 – 2	1 – 3
Marítimo (N/A)	2 – 1	Leixões (I)	1 – 0	1 – 1
Porto (I)	3 – 1	Belenenses (I)	3 – 1	0 – 0
Vitória de Setúbal (I)	3 – 2	Vitória de Guimarães (I)	0 – 1	3 – 1

== Semi-finals ==
Ties were played between the 2–9 June.

Team 1	Agg.	Team 2	1st leg	2nd leg
Benfica (I)	2 – 5	Porto (I)	2 – 2	0 – 3
Marítimo (N/A)	0 – 6	Vitória de Setúbal (I)	0 – 0	0 – 6

== Final ==
16 June 1968

Porto	2 – 1	Vitória de Setúbal
Valdemar 15'; Nóbrega 23'	(Report)	Pedras 5'

Estádio Nacional, Oeiras
Referee: Joaquim Campos (Lisbon)
