= Acácio Mesquita =

Portuguese footballer

Personal information
- Full name: Acácio Pereira de Mesquita
- Date of birth: 18 July 1909
- Place of birth: Porto, Portugal
- Date of death: 30 May 1945 (aged 35)
- Position: Midfielder

Senior career*
Years	Team	Apps	(Gls)
1930–1937	FC Porto		

International career
1930–1934	Portugal	2	(0)
- * Club domestic league appearances and goals

Acácio Pereira de Mesquita (born 18 July 1909 in Porto - deceased 30 May 1945) was a Portuguese footballer who played as midfielder.
