= António Paula =

Portuguese footballer

Personal information
- Full name: António Manuel Louro Paula
- Date of birth: 14 August 1937 (age 89)
- Place of birth: Portugal
- Position: Defender

Senior career*
| Years | Team | Apps | (Gls) |
| 1959–1966 | Porto | | |
| 1966–1968 | Benfica | | |

International career
| 1963 | Portugal | 1 | (0) |
- * Club domestic league appearances and goals

António Manuel Louro Paula (born 14 August 1937) is a Portuguese former footballer who played as a defender.
