= Fernando Perdigão =

Portuguese footballer

Perdigão
Personal information
- Full name: Fernando Júlio Perdigão
- Date of birth: 11 November 1932
- Place of birth: Lourenço Marques, Mozambique
- Date of death: 16 February 2007 (aged 74)
- Place of death: Aveiro, Portugal
- Position: Forward

Senior career*
Years	Team	Apps	(Gls)
1952–1964	FC Porto	86	(27)

International career
1957	Portugal	1	(0)
- * Club domestic league appearances and goals

Fernando Júlio Perdigão (11 November 1932 — 16 February 2007) was a Portuguese footballer who played as a forward.
