= Serafim Pereira =

Portuguese footballer

Personal information
- Full name: Manuel Serafim Monteiro Pereira
- Date of birth: 25 July 1943
- Place of birth: Rio Tinto, Portugal
- Date of death: 7 June 1994 (aged 50)
- Place of death: Portugal
- Height: 1.78 m (5 ft 10 in)
- Position: Forward

Senior career*
Years	Team	Apps	(Gls)
1960–1963	Porto	57	(19)
1963–1966	Benfica	24	(9)
1966–1972	Académica	78	(15)
Total		159	(43)

International career
1962–1967	Portugal	5	(0)
- * Club domestic league appearances and goals

Manuel Serafim Monteiro Pereira (25 July 1943 – 7 June 1994) was a Portuguese footballer who played as forward.
