= Hernâni Silva =

Portuguese footballer

Hernâni
Personal information
- Full name: Hernâni Ferreira da Silva
- Date of birth: 1 September 1931
- Place of birth: Águeda, Portugal
- Date of death: 5 April 2001 (aged 69)
- Place of death: Porto, Portugal
- Position: Winger

Senior career*
Years	Team	Apps	(Gls)
1950–1952	Porto	22	(5)
1952–1953	Estoril	24	(9)
1953–1964	Porto	233	(123)

International career
1953–1964	Portugal	28	(5)
- * Club domestic league appearances and goals

Hernâni Ferreira da Silva (1 September 1931 – 5 April 2001) was a Portuguese football player who played almost his entire career at FC Porto. He was born in Águeda, Portugal and was chosen by Portuguese sports newspaper Record as one of the best 100 Portuguese football players ever.

Hernâni made 28 appearances for the Portugal national football team from 1953 to 1964.

== Honours ==
Porto

- Primeira Liga (2): 1955–56, 1958–59
- Taça de Portugal (2): 1955–56, 1957–58
