= Carlos Duarte (footballer) =

Portuguese footballer (1933–2022)

Personal information
- Full name: Carlos Domingos Duarte
- Date of birth: 25 March 1933
- Place of birth: Huambo, Portuguese West Africa
- Date of death: 23 August 2022 (aged 89)
- Position: Forward

Senior career*
Years	Team	Apps	(Gls)
1952–1962	Porto	172	(69)
1964–1965	Leixões		

International career
1953–1959	Portugal	7	(1)
- * Club domestic league appearances and goals

Carlos Domingos Duarte (25 March 1933 – 23 August 2022) was a Portuguese footballer who played as a forward for Porto, and the Portugal national team.

== International career ==
Duarte gained seven caps and scored one goal for the Portugal national team. He made his debut against South Africa on 21 November 1953 in Lisbon in a 3–1 win.

== Honours ==
Porto

- Portuguese championship: 1955–56, 1958–59
- Cup of Portugal: 1955–56, 1957–58
