= Francisco Nóbrega =

Portuguese footballer

Nóbrega
Personal information
- Full name: Francisco Lage Pereira de Nóbrega
- Date of birth: 14 April 1942
- Place of birth: Vila Real, Portugal
- Date of death: 28 April 2012 (aged 70)
- Place of death: Porto
- Position: Forward

Senior career*
Years	Team	Apps	(Gls)
1963–1968	FC Porto		

International career
1964–1967	Portugal	4	(0)
- * Club domestic league appearances and goals

Francisco Lage Pereira de Nóbrega (14 April 1942 – 28 April 2012) was a Portuguese footballer who played as forward. He played for F.C. Porto from 1963 to 1968 and had 4 international appearances.
