= Monteiro da Costa =

Portuguese footballer (1928–1984)

Personal information
- Full name: António Henrique Monteiro da Costa
- Date of birth: 20 August 1928
- Place of birth: São Paio de Oleiros, Portugal
- Date of death: 2 August 1984 (aged 55)
- Position: Forward

Senior career*
Years	Team	Apps	(Gls)
1946–1948	Espinho	0	(0)
1948–1949	Oliveirense	0	(0)
1949–1962	Porto	269	(76)

International career
1952–1957	Portugal	4	(0)

Managerial career
- 1975: Porto
- * Club domestic league appearances and goals

António Henrique Monteiro da Costa (20 August 1928 – 2 August 1984) was a Portuguese footballer who played as a forward. He died on 2 August 1984, at the age of 55.
