= 1958–59 Primeira Divisão =

25th season of top-tier Portuguese football

Primeira Liga
- Season: 1958–59
- Champions: F.C. Porto; 5th title
- Relegated: F.C. Barreirense; Caldas S.C. S.C.U. Torreense
- European Cup: F.C. Porto
- Matches: 182
- Goals: 691 (3.8 per match)

Statistics of Portuguese Liga in the 1958–59 season.

== Overview ==
Location of teams in the 1958–59 Liga

It was contested by 14 teams, and F.C. Porto won the championship.

== League standings ==
Pos	Team	Pld	W	D	L	GF	GA	GD	Pts	Qualification or relegation
1	Porto (C)	26	17	7	2	81	22	+59	41	Qualification to European Cup preliminary round
2	Benfica	26	17	7	2	78	20	+58	41	
3	Belenenses	26	16	6	4	65	27	+38	38	
4	Sporting CP	26	12	7	7	50	28	+22	31	
5	Vitória de Guimarães	26	13	3	10	59	55	+4	29	
6	Vitória de Setúbal	26	11	5	10	53	64	−11	27	
7	Braga	26	9	6	11	48	51	−3	24	
8	Sporting da Covilhã	26	9	4	13	43	65	−22	22	
9	Lusitano de Évora	26	8	5	13	40	49	−9	21	
10	Académica	26	8	5	13	45	46	−1	21	
11	CUF Barreiro	26	8	5	13	34	55	−21	21	
12	Barreirense (R)	26	7	3	16	39	62	−23	17	Relegation to Segunda Divisão
13	Caldas (R)	26	5	6	15	33	76	−43	16	Relegation to Segunda Divisão
14	Torreense (R)	26	5	5	16	23	71	−48	15	Relegation to Segunda Divisão

(C) Champions; (R) Relegated

== Results ==
Home \ Away	ACA	BAR	BEL	BEN	BRA	CAL	CUF	LUS	POR	SCP	SCO	SCT	VGU	VSE
Académica		3–2	1–2	0–3	1–1	11–0	2–0	1–0	0–1	1–0	2–1	5–0	2–2	2–3
Barreirense	2–1		1–3	1–3	1–1	3–2	2–0	2–2	1–2	0–1	6–1	1–2	1–2	4–3
Belenenses	3–1	1–0		1–1	7–0	0–0	3–0	3–0	1–0	2–1	6–0	1–1	2–0	9–1
Benfica	5–0	6–0	3–2		5–1	3–0	7–1	4–0	1–1	4–0	2–1	2–0	7–0	3–0
Braga	1–1	2–0	1–2	2–4		4–2	1–2	5–0	1–2	0–0	3–1	4–0	3–1	3–2
Caldas	2–1	4–3	1–6	1–1	2–2		0–3	1–2	2–2	0–0	0–0	2–1	1–2	4–1
CUF Barreiro	1–0	2–2	2–4	1–4	3–1	1–3		0–0	1–0	1–1	1–2	3–2	1–2	3–2
Lusitano Évora	5–1	3–1	0–0	0–0	3–1	3–1	2–1		1–2	3–3	5–2	7–1	0–3	1–3
Porto	1–1	7–0	7–0	0–0	3–2	10–0	3–0	2–0		1–0	5–2	5–0	6–1	3–3
Sporting CP	1–1	5–1	1–1	2–1	3–4	3–0	1–0	3–1	2–2		8–1	4–0	4–1	2–0
Sporting da Covilhã	3–1	0–1	2–1	1–1	0–3	6–3	2–2	2–1	0–4	1–0		3–0	3–1	5–2
Torreense	2–1	0–1	0–0	1–5	1–1	1–0	1–2	2–0	0–3	0–2	2–1		2–2	4–4
Vitória de Guimarães	4–5	3–2	3–0	2–1	3–1	3–0	5–0	3–0	0–6	1–3	3–3	8–0		4–1
Vitória de Setúbal	1–0	3–1	0–5	2–2	2–0	4–2	3–3	2–1	3–3	1–0	2–0	4–0	1–0	

Legend: Blue = home team win; Yellow = draw; Red = away team win.
