= 2013 Cruzeiro EC season =

Cruzeiro
2013 season
- Chairman: Gilvan Tavares
- Manager: Marcelo Oliveira
- Stadium: Mineirão
- Campeonato Brasileiro: Champion
- Campeonato Mineiro: Runners-up
- Copa do Brasil: Round of 16
- Top goalscorer: League: Borges and Ricardo Goulart (10); All: Borges (19)
- Highest home attendance: 58,113 vs Grêmio (10 November)
- Lowest home attendance: 10,965 vs Villa Nova (8 May)
Home colours	Away colours

The 2013 season is Cruzeiro's ninety-second season in existence and the club's forty-third consecutive season in the top flight of Brazilian football.

== Squad ==
No.	Name	Nationality	Position (s)	Date of Birth (Age)	Signed from
Goalkeepers
1	Fábio	(Brazil)	GK	30 September 1980 (age 46)	(Brazil) Vasco da Gama
12	Rafael	(Brazil)	GK	23 June 1989 (age 37)	Youth product
37	Igor	(Brazil)	GK	31 May 1995 (age 31)	Youth product
Defenders
2	Ceará	(Brazil)	RB	18 June 1980 (age 46)	(France) PSG
3	Léo	(Brazil)	CB	30 January 1988 (age 38)	(Brazil) Palmeiras
4	Victorino	(Uruguay)	CB	11 October 1982 (age 44)	Universidad de Chile
6	Egídio	(Brazil)	LB	16 June 1986 (age 40)	(Brazil) Flamengo
18	Wallace	(Brazil)	CB	14 October 1994 (age 32)	Youth product
23	Everton	(Brazil)	LB / CM / LM	8 August 1984 (age 42)	(Brazil) Fluminense
26	Dedé	(Brazil)	CB	1 July 1988 (age 38)	(Brazil) Vasco da Gama
32	Mayke	(Brazil)	RB	10 November 1992 (age 34)	Youth product
33	Bruno Rodrigo	(Brazil)	CB	12 April 1985 (age 41)	(Brazil) Santos
86	Paulão	(Brazil)	CB	25 February 1986 (age 40)	(China) Guangzhou Evergrande (on loan)
Midfielders
7	Tinga	(Brazil)	CM / DM	13 January 1978 (age 48)	(Brazil) Internacional
8	Henrique	(Brazil)	DM / CM	16 May 1985 (age 41)	(Brazil) Santos
10	Júlio Baptista	(Brazil)	AM / CF / ST	1 October 1981 (age 45)	(Spain) Málaga CF
16	Lucas Silva	(Brazil)	CM / LM	16 February 1993 (age 33)	Youth product
17	Everton Ribeiro	(Brazil)	AM / LM	10 April 1989 (age 37)	(Brazil) Coritiba
19	Nílton	(Brazil)	DM	21 April 1987 (age 39)	(Brazil) Vasco da Gama
27	Élber	(Brazil)	AM / RW	27 May 1992 (age 34)	Youth product
31	Ricardo Goulart	(Brazil)	AM / ST	5 May 1991 (age 35)	(Brazil) Goiás
40	Alisson	(Brazil)	AM	25 June 1993 (age 33)	Youth product
55	Leandro Guerreiro	(Brazil)	CB / DM / CM	17 November 1978 (age 47)	(Brazil) Botafogo
78	Souza	(Brazil)	DM / CM	8 March 1988 (age 38)	(Brazil) Palmeiras
Forwards
9	Borges	(Brazil)	ST	5 October 1980 (age 46)	(Brazil) Santos
11	Dagoberto	(Brazil)	CF / ST	22 March 1983 (age 43)	(Brazil) Internacional
20	Martinuccio	(Argentina)	LW	16 December 1987 (age 38)	(Brazil) Fluminense (on loan)
21	Lucca	(Brazil)	RW / LW	14 February 1990 (age 36)	(Brazil) Criciúma (on loan)
30	Vinícius Araújo	(Brazil)	CF / ST	22 February 1993 (age 33)	Youth product
41	Willian	(Brazil)	CF / ST	19 November 1986 (age 39)	(Ukraine) Metalist Kharkiv (on loan)
88	Luan	(Brazil)	RW / LW	21 September 1988 (age 38)	(Brazil) Palmeiras (on loan)
99	Anselmo Ramon	(Brazil)	CF / ST	23 June 1988 (age 38)	Youth product

Source: Cruzeiro Official Web Site

== Statistics ==
=== Top scorers ===
Position	Nation	Playing position	Name	Friendlies	Campeonato Mineiro	Copa do Brasil	Campeonato Brasileiro	Total
1	(Brazil)	FW	Borges	0	7	2	10	19
2	(Brazil)	MF	Everton Ribeiro	0	5	3	7	15
3	(Brazil)	FW	Dagoberto	1	7	2	4	14
=	(Brazil)	MF	Ricardo Goulart	0	3	1	10	14
5	(Brazil)	FW	Vinícius Araújo	2	1	1	7	11
6	(Brazil)	MF	Diego Souza	1	4	2	1	8
=	(Brazil)	MF	Nílton	0	0	1	7	8
=	(Brazil)	FW	Willian	0	0	1	7	8
9	(Brazil)	FW	Luan	1	0	0	5	6
10	(Brazil)	DF	Bruno Rodrigo	2	1	0	2	5
=	(Brazil)	MF	Júlio Baptista	0	0	0	5	5
12	(Brazil)	DF	Léo	0	3	0	1	4
13	(Brazil)	FW	Anselmo Ramon	1	1	0	1	3
=	(Brazil)	DF	Dedé	0	0	1	2	3
=	(Brazil)	MF	Élber	0	2	0	1	3
=	(Brazil)	DF	Paulão	1	1	0	1	3
17	(Brazil)	DF	Egídio	0	1	1	0	2
=	(Brazil)	MF	Lucas Silva	0	0	0	2	2
=	(Brazil)	FW	Lucca	0	0	2	0	2
=	(Brazil)	DF	Mayke	0	0	0	2	2
=	(Brazil)	MF	Souza	0	0	0	2	2
22	(Argentina)	FW	Martinuccio	1	0	0	0	1
=	(Brazil)	MF	Tinga	0	1	0	0	1
/	/	/	Own goals	0	1	0	0	1
			Total	10	38	17	77	142

== Club ==
=== Coaching staff ===
Position	Name	Nationality
Head coach	Marcelo Oliveira	Brazilian
Assistant Coaches	Ageu Gonçalves de Siqueira	Brazilian
Assistant Coaches	Tico	Brazilian
Goalkeeping Coach	Robertinho	Brazilian
Fitness coaches	Flavio de Oliveira	Brazilian
Fitness coaches	Quintiliano Lemos	Brazilian
Fitness coaches	Eduardo Freitas	Brazilian
Fitness coaches	Juvenilson de Souza	Brazilian
Physiologists	Eduardo Pimenta	Brazilian
Physiologists	Rodrigo Morandi	Brazilian
Physiotherapists	André Rocha	Brazilian
Physiotherapists	Charles Costa	Brazilian
Physiotherapists	Ronner Bolognani	Brazilian
Physiotherapists	João Salomão	Brazilian
Doctors	Sérgio Freire Júnior	Brazilian
Doctors	Walace Espada	Brazilian
Doctors	Leonardo Corradi	Brazilian
Masseurs	Barjão	Brazilian
Masseurs	Edmar Antônio Silva	Brazilian
Masseurs	Hélio Gomes	Brazilian

== Transfers ==
=== In ===
Position	Player	Transferred From	Fee	Date	Source
MF	(Brazil) Diego Souza	(Saudi Arabia) Al Attihad	Free transfer	23 November 2012	
DF	(Brazil) Egídio	(Brazil) Flamengo	Free transfer	3 December 2012	
MF	(Brazil) Uelliton	(Brazil) Vitória	Undisclosed fee	3 December 2012	
DF	(Brazil) Wallace	Youth product	Youth product	6 December 2012	
MF	(Brazil) Alisson	Youth product	Youth product	6 December 2012	
FW	(Brazil) Vinícius Araújo	Youth product	Youth product	6 December 2012	
MF	(Brazil) Henrique	(Brazil) Santos	Swap (Included in Montillo transfer)	3 January 2013	
MF	(Brazil) Ricardo Goulart	(Brazil) Goiás	Undisclosed	5 January 2013	
FW	(Brazil) Lucca	(Brazil) Criciúma	On loan	5 January 2013	
DF	(Brazil) Nirley	(Brazil) Criciúma	On loan	5 January 2013	
DF	(Brazil) Paulão	(China) Guangzhou Evergrande	On loan	7 January 2013	
DF	(Brazil) Bruno Rodrigo	(Brazil) Santos	Free transfer	8 January 2013	
FW	(Brazil) Dagoberto	(Brazil) Internacional	€3M	8 January 2013	
MF	(Brazil) Nílton	(Brazil) Vasco da Gama	Free transfer	9 January 2013	
MF	(Brazil) Everton Ribeiro	(Brazil) Coritiba	€1,5M	11 January 2013	
FW	(Brazil) Ananias	(Brazil) Portuguesa	Undisclosed	24 January 2013	
FW	(Brazil) Luan	(Brazil) Palmeiras	On loan	6 February 2013	
DF	(Brazil) Dedé	(Brazil) Vasco da Gama	€5M	17 April 2013	
DF	(Brazil) Leandrinho	(Brazil) CSA	Undisclosed	24 April 2013	
MF	(Brazil) Souza	(Brazil) Palmeiras	Swap (Included in Ananias loan)	29 May 2013	
FW	(Brazil) Willian	(Ukraine) Metalist Kharkiv	On loan	14 July 2013	
FW	(Brazil) Júlio Baptista	(Spain) Málaga	Free transfer	24 July 2013	

=== Out ===
Position	Player	Transferred To	Fee	Date	Source
DF	(Brazil) Alex Silva	(Brazil) Flamengo	Loan return	21 November 2012	
MF	(Brazil) Willian Magrão	(Brazil) Grêmio	Loan return	4 December 2012	Official website
FW	(Brazil) Wallyson	(Brazil) São Paulo	End of contract	31 December 2012	
MF	(Brazil) Souza	(Brazil) Portuguesa	End of contract	31 December 2012	
MF	(Argentina) Walter Montillo	(Brazil) Santos	€6M	3 January 2013	
DF	(Brazil) Mateus	(Brazil) Sport	Undisclosed fee	4 January 2013	
FW	(Brazil) Wellington Paulista	(England) West Ham	On loan	5 January 2013	
MF	(Colombia) Diego Arias	Free agent	Contract termination	5 January 2013	
DF	(Brazil) Diego Renan	(Brazil) Criciúma	On loan	5 January 2013	
FW	(Brazil) Fabinho	(Brazil) Criciúma	On loan	5 January 2013	
DF	(Brazil) Gilson	(Brazil) Criciúma	On loan	5 January 2013	
MF	(Brazil) Amaral	(Brazil) Criciúma	On loan	5 January 2013	
MF	(Brazil) Sandro Silva	(Brazil) Vasco da Gama	Contract termination	6 January 2013	
MF	(Brazil) Pedro Ken	(Brazil) Vasco da Gama	On loan	6 January 2013	
MF	(Brazil) Charles	(Brazil) Palmeiras	On loan	6 February 2013	
MF	(Brazil) Marcelo Oliveira	(Brazil) Palmeiras	On loan	6 February 2013	
DF	(Brazil) Rafael Donato	(Brazil) Bahia	On loan	17 April 2013	
MF	(Brazil) Alisson	(Brazil) Vasco da Gama	On loan	18 April 2013	
MF	(Brazil) Ananias	(Brazil) Palmeiras	On loan	29 May 2013	
FW	(Brazil) Wellington Paulista	(Brazil) Cricíuma	On loan	6 June 2013	
MF	(Brazil) Diego Souza	(Ukraine) Metalist Kharkiv	€4M	13 July 2013	
FW	(Brazil) Sebá	(Portugal) Estoril	€0,5M	17 July 2013	
DF	(Brazil) Leandrinho	(Brazil) Boa Esporte	On loan	18 August 2013	
DF	(Brazil) Thiago Carvalho	(Brazil) Boa Esporte	On loan	20 August 2013	
MF	(Brazil) Uelliton	(Brazil) Coritiba	On loan	22 August 2013	
DF	(Brazil) Nirley	Free agent	Contract termination	4 September 2013	

=== Overview ===
Competition	First match	Last match	Starting round	Final position	Record							
Competition	First match	Last match	Starting round	Final position	Pld	W	D	L	GF	GA	GD	Win %
Série A	26 May 2013	7 December 2013	Matchday 1	Winners	38	23	7	8	77	37	+40	60.53
Copa do Brasil	10 April 2013	28 August 2013	Third Round	Fourth Round	7	6	0	1	17	3	+14	85.71
Campeonato Mineiro	3 February 2013	19 May 2013	Matchday 1	Runners-up	15	13	1	1	38	13	+25	86.67
Total					60	42	8	10	132	53	+79	70.00

Source: Competitions

== Friendlies ==
27 January Friendly	Mamoré	1–4	Cruzeiro	Patos de Minas
17:00 UTC−02:00	Myller Alves 12'	Report (pt)	Diego Souza 34'; Vinícius Araújo 47'; Paulão 69'; Dagoberto 87' (pen.)	Stadium: Estádio Bernardo Rubinger de Queiroz (Arena Kickball); Referee: Flávio Henrique Coutinho Teixeira

23 June Friendly	Fort Lauderdale Strikers (United States)	0–4	(Brazil) Cruzeiro	Fort Lauderdale
18:00 UTC−03:00		Report (pt)	Luan 23'; Bruno Rodrigo 33'; Anselmo Ramon 38'; Martinuccio 75'	Stadium: Lockhart Stadium; Attendance: 5,724

29 June Friendly	Cruzeiro (Brazil)	2–1	(Mexico) Monarcas Morelia	Chicago
15:00 UTC−03:00	Bruno Rodrigo; Vinícius Araújo		Mancilla	Stadium: Toyota Park

== Competitions ==
=== Campeonato Brasileiro ===
==== Results summary ====
Overall								Home						Away					
Pld	W	D	L	GF	GA	GD	Pts	W	D	L	GF	GA	GD	W	D	L	GF	GA	GD
38	23	7	8	77	37	+40	76	14	3	2	47	16	+31	9	4	6	30	21	+9

==== Matches ====
26 May 2013 1	Cruzeiro	5–0	Goiás	Belo Horizonte
18:30 UTC−03:00	Diego Souza 5'; Bruno Rodrigo 30'; Nilton 40', 79'; Borges 42'	Report		Stadium: Independência; Attendance: 12,018; Referee: Ronan Marques da Rosa

29 May 2013 2	Atlético Paranaense	2–2	Cruzeiro	Curitiba
15:00 UTC−03:00	Pedro Botelho 7'; Manoel 28'	Report	Dedé 42'; Luan 46'	Stadium: Vila Olímpica; Attendance: 4,113; Referee: André Luiz de Freitas Castro

1 June 2013 3	Botafogo	2–1	Cruzeiro	Volta Redonda
16:20 UTC−03:00	Lodeiro 6', 56' (pen.)	Report	Anselmo Ramon 24'	Stadium: Raulino de Oliveira; Attendance: 4,469; Referee: Wilton Pereira Sampaio

5 June 2013 4	Cruzeiro	1–0	Corinthians	Sete Lagoas
22:00 UTC−03:00	Dagoberto 84' (pen.)	Report		Stadium: Arena do Jacaré; Attendance: 15,082; Referee: Jaílson Macedo Freitas

8 June 2013 5	Cruzeiro	2–2	Internacional	Sete Lagoas
16:20 UTC−03:00	Élber 37'; Everton Ribeiro 62' (pen.)	Report	Otávio 22'; Gabriel 73'	Stadium: Arena do Jacaré; Attendance: 15,513; Referee: Guilherme Ceretta de Lima

6 July 2013 6	Portuguesa	1–1	Cruzeiro	São Paulo
21:00 UTC−03:00	Valdomiro 4'	Report	Bruno Rodrigo 17'	Stadium: Canindé; Attendance: 2,769; Referee: Paulo Henrique de Godoy Bezerra

14 July 2013 7	Cruzeiro	3–0	Náutico	Belo Horizonte
18:30 UTC−03:00	Ricardo Goulart 9'; Vinícius Araújo 53', 69'	Report		Stadium: Mineirão; Attendance: 15,528; Referee: Márcio Chagas da Silva

20 July 2013 8	São Paulo	0–3	Cruzeiro	São Paulo
18:30 UTC−03:00		Report	Luan 51', 78', 81'	Stadium: Morumbi; Attendance: 11,698; Referee: Héber Roberto Lopes

28 July 2013 9	Cruzeiro	4–1	Atlético Mineiro	Belo Horizonte
16:00 UTC−03:00	Everton Ribeiro 31'; Ricardo Goulart 42', 57'; Nilton 52'	Report	Alecsandro 18' (pen.)	Stadium: Mineirão; Attendance: 35,689; Referee: Cleisson Veloso Pereira

31 July 2013 10	Fluminense	1–0	Cruzeiro	Rio de Janeiro
19:30 UTC−03:00	Fred 77'	Report		Stadium: Maracanã; Attendance: 18,042; Referee: Wilton Pereira Sampaio

3 August 2013 11	Cruzeiro	1–0	Coritiba	Belo Horizonte
18:30 UTC−03:00	Luan 56'	Report		Stadium: Mineirão; Attendance: 25,108; Referee: Francisco Carlos do Nascimento

7 August 2013 12	Criciúma	1–2	Cruzeiro	Criciúma
19:30 UTC−03:00	Bruno Lopes 69'	Report	Vinícius Araújo 23'; Ricardo Goulart 82'	Stadium: Heriberto Hülse; Attendance: 11,057; Referee: Marcos André Gomes da Penha

11 August 2013 13	Cruzeiro	0–0	Santos	Belo Horizonte
16:00 UTC−03:00		Report		Stadium: Mineirão; Attendance: 27,709; Referee: Paulo Henrique de Godoy Bezerra

14 August 2013 14	Grêmio	3–1	Cruzeiro	Porto Alegre
21:50 UTC−03:00	Werley 57'; Barcos 60'; Kléber 72'	Report	Nilton 66'	Stadium: Arena do Grêmio; Attendance: 17,330; Referee: Paulo Cesar de Oliveira

17 August 2013 15	Cruzeiro	5–1	Vitória	Belo Horizonte
18:30 UTC−03:00	Léo 10'; Mayke 58'; Borges 73'; Ricardo Goulart 78'; Vinícius Araújo 84'	Report	Dinei 68' (pen.)	Stadium: Mineirão; Attendance: 15,014; Referee: Marcelo de Lima Henrique

24 August 2013 16	Ponte Preta	0–2	Cruzeiro	Campinas
18:30 UTC−03:00		Report	Dedé 22'; Borges 71'	Stadium: Moisés Lucarelli; Attendance: 5,974; Referee: Wilton Pereira Sampaio

1 September 2013 17	Cruzeiro	5–3	Vasco	Belo Horizonte
18:30 UTC−03:00	Willian 1'; Lucas Silva 32', 67'; Júlio Baptista 38'; Vinícius Araújo 86'	Report	Willie 18', 43'; André 40'	Stadium: Mineirão; Attendance: 18,607; Referee: Flávio Rodrigues Guerra

4 September 2013 18	Bahia	1–3	Cruzeiro	Salvador
21:50 UTC−03:00	Fahel 68'	Report	Borges 24'; Everton Ribeiro 39'; Júlio Baptista 89'	Stadium: Arena Fonte Nova; Attendance: 10,502; Referee: Paulo César de Oliveira

8 September 2013 19	Cruzeiro	1–0	Flamengo	Belo Horizonte
16:00 UTC−03:00	Ricardo Goulart 53'	Report		Stadium: Mineirão; Attendance: 37,466; Referee: Anderson Daronco

11 September 2013 20	Goiás	1–2	Cruzeiro	Goiânia
21:00 UTC−03:00	Renan Oliveira 27'	Report	Willian 38', 71'	Stadium: Serra Dourada; Attendance: 10,786; Referee: Péricles Bassols

14 September 2013 21	Cruzeiro	1–0	Atlético Paranaense	Belo Horizonte
18:30 UTC−03:00	Nilton 35'	Report		Stadium: Mineirão; Attendance: 31,660; Referee: Raphael Claus

18 September 2013 22	Cruzeiro	3–0	Botafogo	Belo Horizonte
21:50 UTC−03:00	Nilton 45+1'; Júlio Baptista 81' (pen.), 87'	Report		Stadium: Mineirão; Attendance: 46,167; Referee: Luiz Flávio de Oliveira

22 September 2013 23	Corinthians	0–0	Cruzeiro	São Paulo
16:00 UTC−03:00		Report		Stadium: Pacaembu; Attendance: 28,740; Referee: Felipe Gomes da Silva

29 September 2013 24	Internacional	1–2	Cruzeiro	Novo Hamburgo
18:30 UTC−03:00	Otávio 5'	Report	Nilton 4'; Willian 52'	Stadium: Estádio do Vale; Attendance: 6,129; Referee: Wilton Pereira Sampaio

2 October 2013 25	Cruzeiro	4–0	Portuguesa	Belo Horizonte
19:30 UTC−03:00	Everton Ribeiro 5'; Borges 15', 29'; Willian 27'	Report		Stadium: Mineirão; Attendance: 33,633; Referee: Jean Pierre Gonçalves Lima

6 October 2013 26	Náutico	1–4	Cruzeiro	São Lourenço da Mata
16:00 UTC−03:00	Maikon Leite 28'	Report	Ricardo Goulart 9', 52'; Everton Ribeiro 58' (pen.); Mayke 76'	Stadium: Arena Pernambuco; Attendance: 20,661; Referee: Dewson Fernando Freitas da Silva

9 October 2013 27	Cruzeiro	0–2	São Paulo	Belo Horizonte
21:50 UTC−03:00		Report	Douglas 77'; Reinaldo 80'	Stadium: Mineirão; Attendance: 40,743; Referee: Jaílson Macedo Freitas

13 October 2013 28	Atlético Mineiro	1–0	Cruzeiro	Belo Horizonte
16:00 UTC−03:00	Fernandinho 85'	Report		Stadium: Independência; Attendance: 15,368; Referee: Luiz Flávio de Oliveira

16 October 2013 29	Cruzeiro	1–0	Fluminense	Belo Horizonte
19:30 UTC−03:00	Borges 17'	Report		Stadium: Mineirão; Attendance: 33,408; Referee: Paulo Henrique de Godoy Bezerra

20 October 2013 30	Coritiba	2–1	Cruzeiro	Curitiba
18:30 UTC−02:00	Carlinhos 41'; Keirrison 72'	Report	Dagoberto 62' (pen.)	Stadium: Couto Pereira; Attendance: 16,264; Referee: Jaílson Macedo Freitas

26 October 2013 31	Cruzeiro	5–3	Criciúma	Belo Horizonte
18:30 UTC−02:00	Everton Ribeiro 12'; Dagoberto 19', 84' (pen.); Borges 57', 76'	Report	João Vitor 33'; Lins 41'; Ricardinho 44'	Stadium: Mineirão; Attendance: 38,378; Referee: Wilton Ferreira Sampaio

3 November 2013 32	Santos	0–1	Cruzeiro	Santos
17:30 UTC−02:00		Report	Everton Ribeiro 54'	Stadium: Vila Belmiro; Attendance: 9,460; Referee: Marcelo de Lima Henrique

10 November 2013 33	Cruzeiro	3–0	Grêmio	Belo Horizonte
17:00 UTC−02:00	Borges 33'; Willian 78'; Ricardo Goulart 85'	Report		Stadium: Mineirão; Attendance: 58,113; Referee: Wilson Luiz Seneme

13 November 2013 34	Vitória	1–3	Cruzeiro	Salvador
21:50 UTC−02:00	Dinei 50'	Report	Willian 36'; Júlio Baptista 70'; Ricardo Goulart 80'	Stadium: Barradão; Attendance: 27,168; Referee: Paulo Henrique de Godoy Bezerra

17 November 2013 35	Cruzeiro	2–2	Ponte Preta	Uberlândia
17:00 UTC−02:00	Souza 74'; Vinícius Araújo 83'	Report	Leonardo 4', 90+1'	Stadium: Parque do Sabiá; Attendance: 13,168; Referee: Cláudio Francisco Lima e Silva

23 November 2013 36	Vasco da Gama	2–1	Cruzeiro	Rio de Janeiro
19:30 UTC−02:00	Thalles 3'; Edmilson 33'	Report	Paulão 65'	Stadium: Maracanã; Attendance: 38,654; Referee: Marcos André da Penha

2 December 2013 37	Cruzeiro	1–2	Bahia	Belo Horizonte
17:00 UTC−02:00	Vinícius Araújo 85'	Report	Marquinhos 15'; Talisca 90'	Stadium: Mineirão; Attendance: 47,799; Referee: André Luiz de Freitas Castro

7 December 2013 38	Flamengo	1–1	Cruzeiro	Rio de Janeiro
19:00 UTC−02:00	Hernane 13'	Report	Souza 64'	Stadium: Maracanã; Attendance: 32,624; Referee: Paulo Henrique de Godoy Bezerra

=== Campeonato Mineiro ===
==== Results summary ====
Overall								Home						Away					
Pld	W	D	L	GF	GA	GD	Pts	W	D	L	GF	GA	GD	W	D	L	GF	GA	GD
15	13	1	1	38	13	+25	40	7	0	0	17	4	+13	6	1	1	21	9	+12

Last updated: 19 May 2013.
Source: Soccerway

==== First stage ====
3 February 3	Cruzeiro	2–1	Atlético Mineiro	Belo Horizonte
17:00 UTC−02:00	Marcos Rocha 22' (o.g.); Dagoberto 61'	Report	Araújo 27'	Stadium: Mineirão; Attendance: 52,989; Referee: Cleisson Veloso Pereira

6 February 1	Cruzeiro	2–0	América-TO	Belo Horizonte
22:00 UTC−02:00	Anselmo Ramon 41'; Dagoberto 49' (pen.)	Report		Stadium: Mineirão; Attendance: 14,543; Referee: Marcos Vinícius de Sá dos Santos

17 February 2	Guarani	0–0	Cruzeiro	Nova Serrana
18:30 UTC−02:00		Report		Stadium: Arena do Calçado; Attendance: 10,000; Referee: Emerson de Almeida Ferreira

2 March 4	Cruzeiro	3–1	Tombense	Belo Horizonte
17:00 UTC−03:00	Vinícius Araújo 35'; Everton Ribeiro 72'; Élber 88'	Report	Adeílson 35'	Stadium: Mineirão; Attendance: 21,152; Referee: Ronei Cândido Alves

10 March 5	Araxá	2–3	Cruzeiro	Araxá
16:00 UTC−03:00	Rodrigão Paulista 45'; Fabrício Carvalho 68' (pen.)	Report	Paulão 63'; Borges 65', 73'	Stadium: Estádio Municipal Fausto Alvim; Attendance: 5,000; Referee: Cleisson Veloso pereira

17 March 6	Boa	1–4	Cruzeiro	Varginha
16:00 UTC−03:00	Fernando 35'	Report	Diego Souza 25'; Everton Ribeiro 37'; Borges 56'; Tinga 81'	Stadium: Melão; Referee: Ricardo Marques Ribeiro

24 March 7	Cruzeiro	2–1	Caldense	Belo Horizonte
16:00 UTC−03:00	Dagoberto 73' (pen.); Ricardo Goulart 82'	Report	Nena 19' (pen.)	Stadium: Mineirão; Attendance: 17,329; Referee: Igor Junio Benevenuto

30 March 8	Villa Nova	2–4	Cruzeiro	Nova Lima
18:30 UTC−03:00	Tchô 34'; Eraldo 51'	Report	Borges 13'; Léo 26'; Ricardo Goulart 63', 70'	Stadium: Estádio Castor Cifuentes; Referee: Ronei Candido Alves

7 April 9	América Mineiro	1–4	Cruzeiro	Belo Horizonte
16:00 UTC−03:00	Doriva 63'	Report	Borges 10', 79'; Diego Souza 16'; Bruno Rodrigo 49'	Stadium: Mineirão; Attendance: 29,808; Referee: Emérson de Almeida Ferreira

16 April 10	Cruzeiro	5–0	Nacional	Belo Horizonte
19:30 UTC−03:00	Everton Ribeiro 14'; Dagoberto 18'; Léo 22', 32'; Élber 70'	Report		Stadium: Mineirão; Attendance: 11,467; Referee: Alício Pena Júnior

21 April 11	Tupi	0–2	Cruzeiro	Juiz de Fora
16:00 UTC−03:00		Report	Dagoberto 5'; Borges 54'	Stadium: Estádio Municipal Radialista Mário Helênio

==== Knockout stage ====
===== Semi-finals =====
28 April First Leg	Villa Nova	0–4	Cruzeiro	Nova Lima
16:00 UTC−03:00		Report	Everton Ribeiro 21', 61'; Diego Souza 23', 36'	Stadium: Estádio Castor Cifuentes; Referee: Igor Junio Benevenuto

8 May Second Leg	Cruzeiro	1–0 (5–0 agg.)	Villa Nova	Belo Horizonte
20:30 UTC−03:00	Egídio 68'	Report	Rafael Graces Silva dos Santos (yellow card) 40'	Stadium: Mineirão; Attendance: 10,965; Referee: Wanderson Alves de Souza

===== Finals =====
12 May 2013 First Leg	Atlético Mineiro	3–0	Cruzeiro	Belo Horizonte
19:00	Jô 15'; Gilberto Silva (yellow card) 28'; Réver (yellow card) 42'; Pierre (yellow card) 43'; Diego Tardelli 71'; Marcos Rocha 78'	Report	Everton Ribeiro (yellow card) 35'; Bruno Rodrigo (yellow card) 39' (yellow-red card); Everton (yellow card) 41'; Dagoberto (yellow card) 43'; Ceará (yellow card) 51'; Diego Souza (yellow card) 88'	Stadium: Estádio Independência; Attendance: 19,442; Referee: Luiz Flavio De Oliveira

19 May 2013 Second Leg	Cruzeiro	2–1 (2–4 agg.)	Atlético Mineiro	Belo Horizonte
19:00	Dagoberto 17' (pen.) 33' (pen.); Borges (yellow card) 44'; Leandro Guerreiro (yellow card) 55'; Diego Souza (yellow card) 58'; Nilton (yellow card) 84'	Report	Gilberto Silva (yellow card) 16'; Ronaldinho (yellow card) 51' (goal) 78' (pen.); Luan (red card) 89'; Leandro Donizete (yellow card) 90'	Stadium: Mineirão; Attendance: 19,442; Referee: Leandro Pedro Vuaden

=== Copa do Brasil ===
==== Results summary ====
Overall								Home						Away					
Pld	W	D	L	GF	GA	GD	Pts	W	D	L	GF	GA	GD	W	D	L	GF	GA	GD
7	6	0	1	17	3	+14	18	3	0	0	11	1	+10	3	0	1	6	2	+4

Last updated: 17 July 2013.
Source: Soccerway

==== First round ====
10 April First leg	CSA	0–3 ( Eliminated second leg )	Cruzeiro	Maceió
21:50 UTC−03:00		Report	Diego Souza 9'; Dagoberto 53' (pen.); Ricardo Goulart 86'	Stadium: Estádio Rei Pelé; Referee: Jailson Macedo Freitas

==== Second round ====
1 May First leg	Resende	1–2	Cruzeiro	Volta Redonda
21:50 UTC−03:00	Guto 75'	Report	Everton Ribeiro 57'; Nilton 58'	Stadium: Estádio Raulino de Oliveira; Referee: Marcos André Gomes da Penha

22 May Second leg	Cruzeiro	4–0 (1–6 agg.)	Resende	Belo Horizonte
21:50 UTC−03:00	Dagoberto 5'; Borges 36', 48'; Lucca 88'	Report		Stadium: Mineirão; Attendance: 13,300; Referee: Rodrigo Batista Raposo

==== Third round ====
9 July First leg	Cruzeiro	5–0	Atlético Goianiense	Belo Horizonte
21:50 UTC−03:00	Diego Souza 10'; Dedé (yellow card) 30' (goal) 44'; Vinícius Araújo 31'; Everton Ribeiro 58'; Bruno Rodrigo (red card) 63'; Egídio 76'	Report	João Paulo Mior (yellow card) 64'	Stadium: Mineirão; Attendance: 11,317; Referee: Rodrigo Nunes de Sá

17 July Second leg	Atlético Goianiense	0–1 (0–6 agg.)	Cruzeiro	Goiânia
19:30 UTC−03:00		Report	Lucca 10'	Stadium: Estádio Serra Dourada; Attendance: 1,280; Referee: Raphael Claus

==== Fourth round ====
21 August First leg	Cruzeiro	2–1	Flamengo	Belo Horizonte
21:50 UTC−03:00	Willian 28'; Everton Ribeiro 57'	Report	Carlos Eduardo 69'	Stadium: Mineirão; Attendance: 33,645; Referee: Marcelo Aparecido de Souza

28 August Second leg	Flamengo	1–0 (2–2 agg.)	Cruzeiro	Rio de Janeiro
19:30 UTC−03:00	Elias 88'	Report		Stadium: Maracanã; Attendance: 53,538; Referee: Jaílson Macedo Freitas
Note: Flamengo won on away goals.
