= Eleuterio =

Eleuterio or Eleutério is a given name. Notable people with the name include:

- Eleuterio Maisonnave y Cutayar (1840–1890), Spanish politician, Minister of State in 1873, under President Francisco Pi y Margall
- Eleuterio Felice Foresti (1789–1858), Italian patriot and scholar
- Eleuterio Francesco Fortino (1938–2010), Italian priest of the Italo-Albanian Catholic Church
- Laureano Eleuterio Gomez (1889–1965), the 18th President of Colombia, from 1950 to 1953
- José Eleuterio González (1813–1888), Mexican physician and philanthropist, founder of the UANL and the Hospital Universitario
- Eleuterio Fernández Huidobro (1942–2016), Uruguayan politician, journalist, and writer
- Eleuterio Pagliano (1826–1903), Italian painter of the Romantic period as well as an activist and fighter of the Risorgimento
- Eleuterio Quiñones, recurring fictional character in Puerto Rican radio and television, voiced by Sunshine Logroño
- Eleuterio Quintanilla (1886–1966), Spanish anarchist, educator and pupil of Francisco Ferrer Guardia
- Eleuterio Ramírez (1837–1879), Chilean military figure
- Eleuterio Rodolfi (1876–1933), Italian actor, screenwriter and film director
- Eleuterio Sánchez (born 1942), known as El Lute, was listed as Spain's "Most Wanted" criminal; later became a published writer
- António Eleutério dos Santos (born 1928), former Portuguese footballer
- Eleuterio Santos (1940–2008), Spanish footballer
- Leandro Eleutério de Souza (born 1985), Brazilian Right Back
- Eleuterio Zapanta or Little Dado, (1916–1965), flyweight boxer from the Philippines, twice World Champion

== See also ==
- Estadio Arquitecto Antonio Eleuterio Ubilla, multi-use stadium in Melo, Uruguay
- Eleuter
- Eleutherios (disambiguation)
