= 1953 Taça de Portugal final =

- Event: 1952–53 Taça de Portugal
Benfica	Porto
5	0
- Date: 28 June 1953
- Venue: Estádio Nacional, Oeiras
- Referee: Evaristo Santos (Setúbal)

The 1953 Taça de Portugal final was the final match of the 1952–53 Taça de Portugal, the 13th season of the Taça de Portugal, the premier Portuguese football cup competition organized by the Portuguese Football Federation (FPF). The match was played on 28 June 1953 at the Estádio Nacional in Oeiras, and opposed two Primeira Liga sides: Benfica and Porto. Benfica defeated Porto 5–0 to claim their seventh Taça de Portugal.

== Match ==
=== Details ===
28 June 1953

Benfica	5–0	Porto
Pipi 34'; Arsénio 38', 68', 69'; Águas 39'

Estádio Nacional, Oeiras
Referee: Evaristo Santos (Setúbal)

Benfica	Porto

GK	1	(Portugal) José de Bastos
DF		(Portugal) Ângelo Martins
DF		(Portugal) Joaquim Fernandes
DF		(Portugal) Artur Santos
DF		(Portugal) Félix Antunes
MF		(Portugal) Rogério Pipi
MF		(Portugal) Francisco Moreira (c)
MF		(Portugal) Rosário
MF		(Portugal) Vieirinha
FW		(Portugal) Arsénio Duarte
FW		(Portugal) José Águas
Substitutes:
Manager:
(Portugal) António Ribeiro dos Reis

GK	1	(Portugal) Frederico Barrigana
DF		(Portugal) Carlos Vieira
DF		(Portugal) Virgílio
DF		(Portugal) Ângelo Carvalho (c)
MF		(Portugal) João Correia
MF		(Portugal) António Eleutério
MF		(Portugal) Pinto Vieira
FW		(Portugal) Monteiro da Costa
FW		(Portugal) António Teixeira
FW		(Portugal) Carlos Duarte
FW		(Portugal) José Maria
Substitutes:
Manager:
(Portugal) Cândido de Oliveira

1952–53 Taça de Portugal Winners
Benfica
7th Title

Match officials

- Assistant referees:
- Fourth official:

Match rules

- 90 minutes.

== See also ==
- O Clássico
