= Eleutherios =

Eleutherios or Lefteris (Greek: Ελευθέριος, "the liberator") is an epithet and formal attribution in the Greek pantheon, including:

- Dionysus
- Eros
- Helios
- Zeus

From Eleuther, son of Apollo and Aethusa.

1. He is renowned for having an excellent singing voice, which earned him a victory at the Pythian games,
2. and for having been the first to erect a statue of Dionysus.
3. as well as for having given his name to Eleutherae.
4. His sons were Iasius.
5. and Pierus. He also had several daughters, who spoke impiously of the image of Dionysus wearing a black aegis, and were driven mad by the god; as a remedy, Eleuther, in accordance with an oracle, established a cult of "Dionysus of the Black Aegis".
6. Eleuther, a variant of the name Eleutherios, early Greek god who was the son of Zeus and probably an alternate name of Dionysus.
7. Eleuther, one of the twenty sons of Lycaon. He and his brother Lebadus were the only not guilty of the abomination prepared for Zeus, and fled to Boeotia.
8. Eleuther, one of the Curetes, was said to have been the eponym of the towns Eleutherae and Eleuthernae in Crete.

== Given name ==
It is also used as a first name in modern Greek (alternatively transliterated as Eleftherios, in the short form Lefteris):

- Eleftherios Eleftheriou (born 1974), Cypriot football midfielder
- Eleftherios Foulidis (born 1948), Greek iconographer, born in Drepano, Kozani
- Eleftherios Mertakas (born 1985), Cypriot football midfielder
- Eleftherios Papasymeon, Greek athlete who competed at the 1896 Summer Olympics in Athens
- Eleftherios Poupakis (born 1946), retired Greek footballer
- Eleftherios Sakellariou (born 1987), Greek footballer
- Eleftherios Venizelos (1864–1936), Greek revolutionary, statesman and charismatic leader in the early 20th century
- Lefteris Nikolaou-Alavanos, (fl. 2019 -), Greek member of the European Parliament
- Lefteris Pantazis (born 1955), Greek singer
- Lefteris Papadopoulos (born 1935), Greek lyricist and journalist
- Lefteris Papadimitriou, Greek composer and performer

== See also ==
- Agios Eleftherios (disambiguation), may refer to two villages and one church
- Soter
- Eleftheria, the feminine version of the modern Greek name
- Eleuterio
- Eleutherius (disambiguation)
- Savior (disambiguation)
- Slobodan
