= Eleftheria =

Eleftheria is a Greek female given name. Notable people with the name include:

- Eleftheria Arvanitaki (born 1957), Greek folk singer
- Eleftheria Evgenia Efstathiou (born 1989), Greek swimmer
- Eleftheria Eleftheriou (born 1989), Greek Cypriot singer, musician, and actress
- Eleftheria Ftouli (born 1981), Greek synchronized swimmer
- Eleftheria Hatzinikou (born 1978), Greek volleyball player
- Eleftheria Maratos-Flier (born 1951), American endocrinologist
- Eleftheria Mavrogeni (born 1970), Greek handball player
- Eleftheria Plevritou (born 1997), Greek water polo player
- Eleftheria Zeggini, Greek geneticist

== See also ==
- Eleftheria terrae, species of bacterium
- Eleutherios, masculine version of the Greek name
