= Eleutherius =

Eleutherius, Eleutherus or Eleuterus is a masculine given name which may refer to:

== Saints ==
- Pope Eleutherius (died 189)
- Eleutherius of Nicomedia (died 303), Roman soldier who was martyred under Diocletian
- Eleutherius of Rocca d'Arce, 12th century English pilgrim
- Eleutherius of Tournai (died 532), bishop of Tournai, evangelist of the Franks
- Eleutherius and Antia, son (121–?) and mother martyrs
- the martyred companion of Saint Denis of Paris (died c. 250)

== Patriarchs and exarchs ==
- Eleutherius of Byzantium, Patriarch of Constantinople (129–136)
- Eleutherius, Greek Patriarch of Antioch (1023–1028)
- Eleutherius, Greek Patriarch of Alexandria (1175–1180)
- Eleutherius (exarch) (died 620), Exarch of Ravenna

== Bishops ==
- Eleutherius (died 676), Bishop of the West Saxons

== Others ==
- Eleutherius Winance (1909–2009), Belgian-born Benedictine monk and philosophy professor

== See also ==
- Saint Eleutherius (disambiguation)
- Eleutherios (disambiguation)
