= Saint Eleutherius =

Saint Eleutherius may refer to:

- Pope Eleutherius (feast day: 26 May), 2nd-century pope
- Eleutherius of Rocca d'Arce (feast day: 29 May), 12th-century English pilgrim who died at Rocca d'Arce
- Eleutherius of Nicomedia (feast day: 2 October), 4th-century soldier who was martyred under Diocletian
- Eleutherius of Auxerre (feast day: 26 August ), 6th-century bishop of Auxerre
- Eleutherius of Tournai (feast day: 20 February) 6th-century bishop of Tournai
- Eleutherius and Antia (feast day: died 121)
- the martyred companion of Saint Denis of Paris (martyred c.250, feast day: 9 October)

== See also ==
- Eleutherius (disambiguation)
