= Manuel Vieira =

Manuel Vieira may refer to:

- Manuel Silva (sport shooter) (Manuel Moura Vieira da Silva, born 1971), Portuguese sport shooter
- Manuel José Vieira (born 1981), Portuguese footballer
- Manuel Alberto Vieira (1924–2015), Portuguese footballer
- Manuel Vieira Pinto (1923–2020), Portuguese-born Prelate of the Catholic Church in Mozambique
