= Vieirinha (disambiguation) =

Vieirinha may refer to:

- Vieirinha (born 1986), Portuguese footballer
- Vieirinha (footballer, born 1924), Portuguese footballer
- Vieirinha (footballer, born 1996), Portuguese footballer
