= Avelino González Mallada =

Spanish politician and trade unionist (1894–1938)

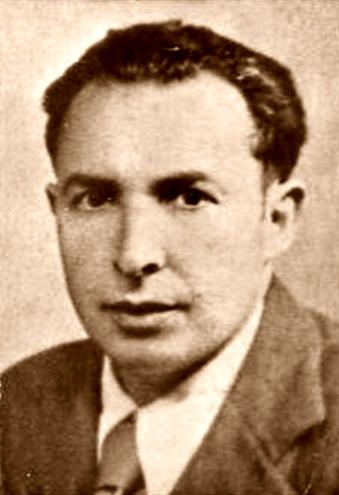
- González Mallada (c. 1937)

Mayor of Gijón
- In office 15 October 1936 – 21 October 1937
- President: Belarmino Tomás
- Preceded by: Jaime Valdés Estrada
- Succeeded by: Alberto Martínez F. Setién

General Secretary of the Confederación Nacional del Trabajo
- In office September 1925 – June 1926
- Preceded by: Unknown
- Succeeded by: Segundo Blanco

Personal details
- Born: 7 August 1894 Gijón, Asturias
- Died: 27 March 1938 (aged 43) Woodstock, Virginia, United States
- Citizenship: Spain
- Party: CNT-FAI
- Spouse: Florentina Fernández
- Children: Avelino and Amapola
- Occupation: Anarcho-syndicalist

Avelino González Mallada (7 August 1894 in Gijón – 27 March 1938 in Woodstock) was an Asturian anarchist.

== Biography ==
Born in Gijón on 7 August 1894, he was orphaned at the age of six. In 1905, at the age of eleven, he began working at the Laviada factory, where he first came into contact with the anarchist movement in 1908. He joined the CNT in 1911, which led him to be fired from his job in 1915 for his militancy. He emigrated to Paris, where he remained until 191]. When he returned, he could not secure a job as he found himself on the employer's black list, so he moved to La Felguera where he taught in a rationalist school. In 1922 he returned to Gijón, where he directed the newspaper Vida Obrera. In September 1925 he was elected General Secretary of the CNT, a post which he held until July 1926. He was replaced by Segundo Blanco, whom he had accompanied to the Congress of the Portuguese CGT a year earlier. In 1926 he worked as a teacher at the Neutral School (Spanish: Escuela Neutra), with the pedagogue Eleuterio Quintanilla.

With the proclamation of the Second Spanish Republic, he was put in charge of directing the CNT's newspaper Solidaridad Obrera and until 1933 he was on the CNT Regional Committee in Madrid. He became a member of the FAI and the Jovellanos Masonry Lodge. In 1934 he was one of the people in favor of the CNT's participation in the Workers' Alliance, and in 1935 he was commissioned to reorganize the Regional Committee of the CNT in Asturias.

When the Spanish coup of July 1936 took place, he was one of the organizers of the Provincial Committee of the Popular Front of Asturias and represented the CNT in the Gijón Defense Council. On 15 October 1936, he was elected Mayor of Gijón, where a street bears his name today. When Franco's troops entered Gijón in October 1937 he fled to Barcelona, where he remained until February 1938, when he was appointed special delegate of the General Council of International Anti-Fascist Solidarity and moved to the United States to raise aid for the Republican cause. After being received by the Republican Ambassador Fernando de los Ríos Urruti in Washington DC, he organized several rallies in New York City.

He died in a car accident in Virginia on 27 March 1938, while he was traveling to California to take part in a series of propaganda actions in favor of republican Spain. He left a widow, Florentina Fernández and two children, Avelino and Amapola.

== Bibliography ==
- Álvarez Palomo, Ramón (1987). "Viaje y muerte en Estados Unidos en 1938 de Avelino González Mallada, ex alcalde anarquista de Gijón.". Avelino G. Mallada, alcalde anarquista (in Spanish). Barcelona: C. G. Fernando. ISBN 84-404-1027-1. Archived from the original on 11 July 2009.
- Pozuelo Andrés, Yvàn (2012). La masonería en Asturias (in Spanish). Oviedo: Ediciones de la Universidad de Oviedo. ISBN 978-84-8317-954-3.

| Preceded by Unknown | General Secretary of the CNT 1925–1926 | Succeeded by Segundo Blanco |
