= Fontana Liri =

Fontana Liri Fontana († 1863)
- Comune
- Comune di Fontana Liri
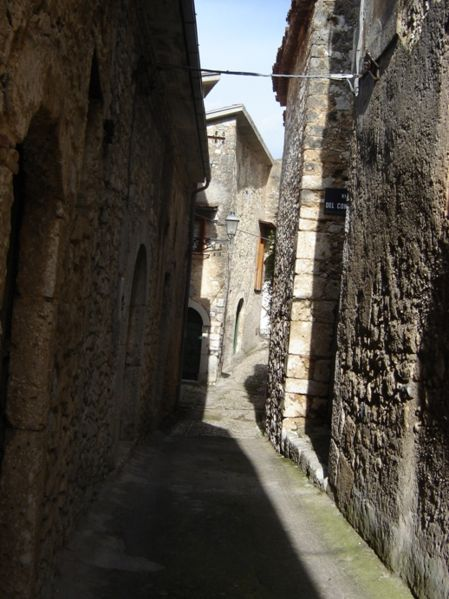
- A view in upper Fontana Liri

- Location within Italy Location within Lazio
- Coordinates: 41°37′N 13°34′E
- Country: Italy
- Region: Lazio
- Province: Frosinone (FR)

Government
  - Mayor: Gianpio Sarracco (Adesso Fontana)

Area
  - Total: 16.0 km^{2} (6.2 sq mi)
- Elevation: 150 m (490 ft)

Population (31 August 2017)
  - Total: 2,932
  - Density: 183/km^{2} (475/sq mi)
- Demonym: Fontanesi
- Time zone: UTC+1 (CET)
  - Summer (DST): UTC+2 (CEST)
- Postal code: 03035
- Dialing code: 0776
- Patron saint: Santo Stefano Protomartire
- Saint day: December 26
- Website: Official website

Fontana Liri is a comune (municipality) in the Province of Frosinone located in the Italian Lazio region, approximately 90 kilometres (56 mi) southeast of Rome and about 15 kilometres (9 mi) east of Frosinone. Fontana Liri is in the Latin Valley.

Fontana Liri borders the following municipalities: Arce, Arpino, Monte San Giovanni Campano, Rocca d'Arce, Santopadre.

The town is the birthplace of Marcello Mastroianni, Umberto Mastroianni and Nicola Parravano.

== Dialect ==
Southern Latian dialect is spoken in the city.
