= Arce, Lazio =

Arce
- Comune
- Comune di Arce
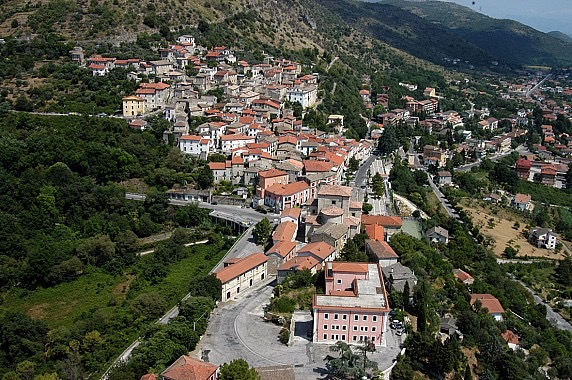
- Town hall and historic center of Arce

- Location within Italy Location within Lazio
- Coordinates: 41°35′N 13°34′E
- Country: Italy
- Region: Lazio
- Province: Frosinone (FR)
- Frazioni: Campanile, Campostefano, Sant'Eleuterio, Collealto, Collemezzo, Collenoci, Colleolivo, Colleone, Fontanelle, Frassi, Isoletta, Marzi, Murata, Portone, Puzzaca, Tramonti, Valle

Government
  - Mayor: Luigi Germani

Area
  - Total: 39.52 km^{2} (15.26 sq mi)
- Elevation: 247 m (810 ft)

Population (30 November 2019)
  - Total: 4,972
  - Density: 125.8/km^{2} (325.8/sq mi)
- Demonym: Arcesi
- Time zone: UTC+1 (CET)
  - Summer (DST): UTC+2 (CEST)
- Postal code: 03032
- Dialing code: 0776
- Patron saint: St. Eleutherius
- Saint day: May 29
- Website: Official website (archive copy)

Arce (Neapolitan: Arcë) is a comune (municipality) in the province of Frosinone, in the region of Lazio, Italy. it is an agricultural centre located on a hill overlooking the Via Casilina, in the Latin Valley and in the middle valley of the Liri.

Arce borders with the municipalities of Ceprano, Colfelice, Falvaterra, Fontana Liri, Monte San Giovanni Campano, Rocca d'Arce, San Giovanni Incarico and Strangolagalli.

== History ==
The name Arce derives from the Roman word "arx", or fortress, to which it was used in various eras, or from Arcanum, the mountain on which the area is lying. The first time that the name of Arce is found in a document is in the Ravenna Cosmography from the 7th century AD. At the time it was part of the Eastern Roman Empire.

In 702, Arce was taken by the Lombard Gisulf I, thus becoming the possession of the Duchy of Benevento. In 846 and in 877 Arce was taken and plundered by the Saracens and again, in 937, by the Magyars. At the end of the 10th century Arce was donated by the Lombard prince of Capua to the monks of Montecassino, who held it until 1058, when the Norman Richard, Count of Aversa, took possession of it. In 1191 Arce was taken by Holy Roman Emperor Henry VI. In 1230, when he returned from the Holy Land, the latter's son Frederick II took over Arce again. In 1265 the town, defended in vain by the troops of Manfredi of Sicily, was taken by Charles I of Anjou. Under the Anjou, Arce was granted in fief first to the Cantelmo family, then to the Della Rovere family. The Della Rovere family held Arce as a fief until 1612, when it was bought by Giacomo Boncompagni (Duchy of Arce and Duchy of Sora). In 1796 the domination of the Boncompagni family ended and the town was aggregated to the Kingdom of Naples. The boundary with the Papal State was marked by 14 stones.

In 1856 the Civita Farnese road was opened, which still today connects Arce with Itri, near to the Tyrrhenian Sea coast. On December 4, 1884, the Roccasecca-Arce railway line was inaugurated, which was subsequently extended to Avezzano. In 1927, with the dismemberment of the former province of Caserta, of which it was part, was included in the province of Frosinone. During late World War II, Arce was occupied by German troops until May 29, 1944, when Allied troops from Cassino arrived.

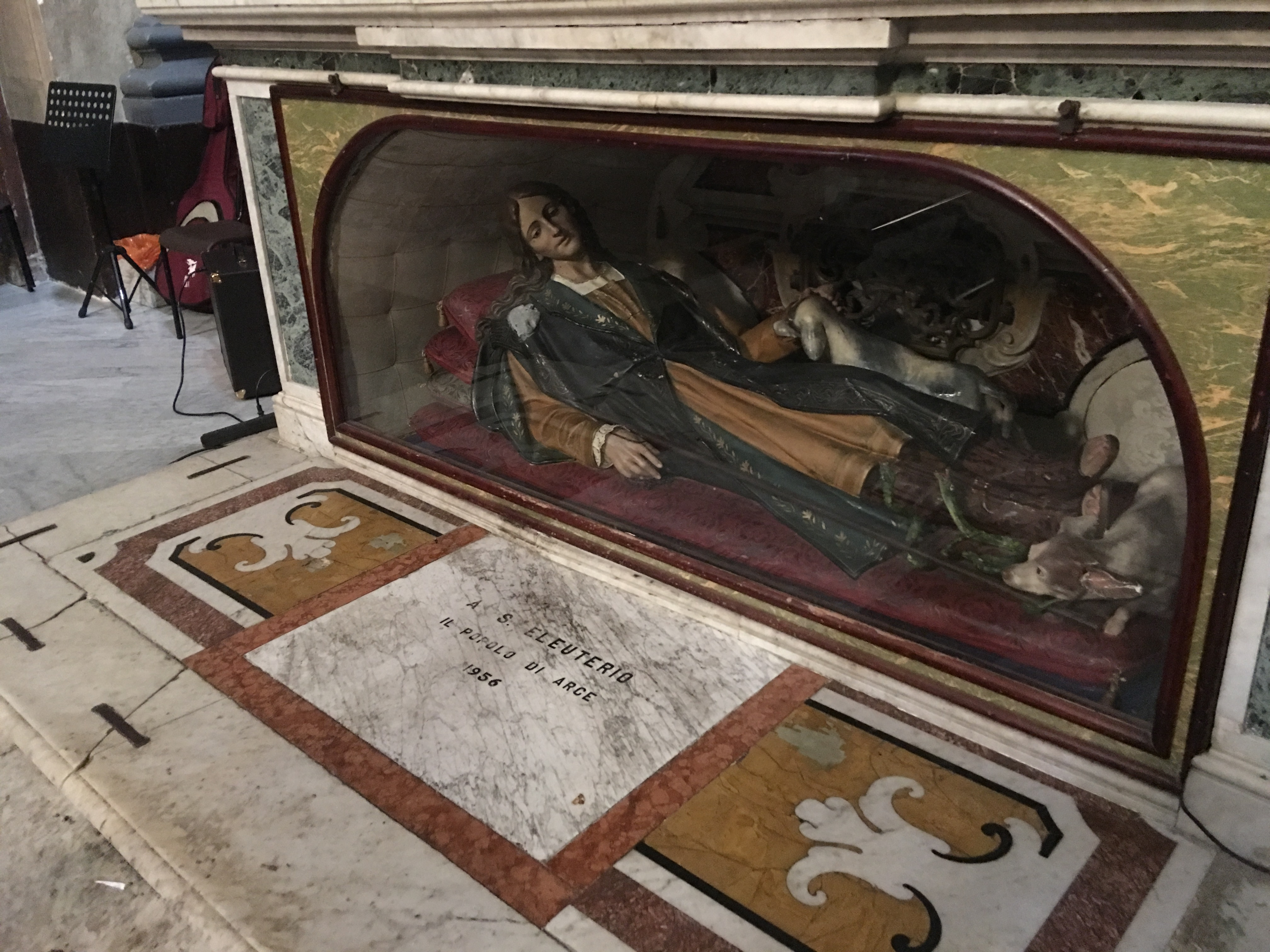
Statue of Sant’Eleuterio inside the Chiesa di San Pietro e Paolo.

== Main sights ==
Main sights include the Baroque Parrocchiale of Santi Pietro e Paolo (late 17th century), the church of Sant'Antonio, which has maintained a 13th-century portal, and the Torre del Pedaggio. The archaeological area of Fregellae is located nearby.

== Economy ==
The local economy includes the production of biodynamic wines, cereals, fruit, olives and forage. It is a region composed of hills, and mountains and is uniquely suited to viticulture because of its mild climate, a rich and varied geological mix of soils of which volcanic soils are prominent, coastal breezes, adequate rainfall, and variations in day-night temperatures. There is an abundance of rare, high-quality native grape varieties, red grape - Lecinaro, white grape - Capolongo, Pampanaro and white Maturano. Also the red grape Maturano, still the subject of research at the centre of Enology along with the red grape Olivella. Local attractions, including museums, bring tourism to the area.
