= Acanthosis nigricans-muscle cramps-acral enlargement syndrome =

- Other names: Acanthosis nigricans-insulin resistance-muscle cramps-acral enlargement
- Specialty: Medical genetics
- Symptoms: Kidney enlargement, localized cutaneous hyperpigmentation, insulin resistance, muscle cramps, and polyendocrine metabolic ovarian syndrome (in women)
- Usual onset: Birth
- Duration: Life-long
- Causes: Autosomal recessive inheritance
- Prevention: none
- Medication: Dilantin
- Prognosis: Good to Ok
- Frequency: very rare, only 2 cases known to medical literature

Acanthosis nigricans-muscle cramps-acral enlargement syndrome, also known as Acanthosis nigricans-insulin resistance-muscle cramps-acral enlargement syndrome, is an extremely rare genetic disorder which is characterized by the appearance of acanthosis nigricans, insulin resistance, muscle cramps of severe intensity, and acral hypertrophy/enlargement. Only 2 cases have been reported in medical literature.

It was first discovered when Jeffrey Flier and his colleagues described two siblings of the opposite sex with the symptoms mentioned above. (plus: large, chunky hands), the sister had virilized polycystic ovaries. After being treated with dilantin, the cramps' severity lowered and the brother's insulin resistance also lowered. The inheritance pattern of this disorder is thought to be autosomal recessive.
