= Colfelice =

- Comune
- Comune di Colfelice
- Location within Italy Location within Lazio
- Coordinates: 41°33′N 13°36′E
- Country: Italy
- Region: Lazio
- Province: Frosinone (FR)

Government
  - Mayor: Bernardo Donfrancesco

Area
  - Total: 14.52 km^{2} (5.61 sq mi)
- Elevation: 158 m (518 ft)

Population (7 August 2022)
  - Total: 1,799
  - Density: 123.9/km^{2} (320.9/sq mi)
- Demonym: Colfelicesi
- Time zone: UTC+1 (CET)
  - Summer (DST): UTC+2 (CEST)
- Postal code: 03030
- Dialing code: 0776
- Patron saint: St. Cajetan
- Saint day: 7 August
- Website: Official website

Colfelice is a comune (municipality) in the Province of Frosinone in the Italian region Lazio, located about 100 kilometres (62 mi) southeast of Rome and about 25 kilometres (16 mi) southeast of Frosinone.

Colfelice borders the following municipalities: Arce, Rocca d'Arce, Roccasecca, San Giovanni Incarico.
