= Saint Fulk =

Saint Fulk was an English pilgrim who was beatified for his selfless assistance of plague victims even when this was a risk to himself. He was travelling to Rome sometime in the 12th century, when he stopped at Santopadre, or Castrofuli, in southern Italy, to help plague victims. He died of the plague, and was beatified and adopted as the patron saint of Castrofuli. His cult was approved in 1572, and his feast day is May 22.
