= Slobodan =

- Pronunciation: [slobǒdan]
- Gender: Male

Origin
- Origin: Serbian
- Meaning: the Free [man]
- Region of origin: Former Yugoslavia

Other names
- Related names: Eleftherios; Francis

Slobodan (Serbian Cyrillic: Слободан) is a Serbo-Croatian masculine given name which means "free" (sloboda / слобода meaning "freedom, liberty") used among other South Slavs as well. It was coined by Serbian liberal politician Vladimir Jovanović who, inspired by John Stuart Mill's essay On Liberty baptised his son as Slobodan in 1869 and his daughter Pravda (Justice) in 1871. It became popular in both the Kingdom of Yugoslavia (1918–1945) and the Socialist Federal Republic of Yugoslavia (1945–1991) among various ethnic groups within Yugoslavia and therefore today there are also Slobodans among Croats, Slovenes and other Yugoslav peoples.

During the decade after World War II, the name Slobodan (means "freedom") became the most popular Serbian male name, and it remained so until 1980.

Common derived nicknames are Sloba, Slobo, Boban, Boba, Bobi and Čobi.

The feminine counterpart is Slobodanka.

A rare short form of the name Slobodan is Bodan, used sometimes in North Macedonia however the name Bodan is probably also a version of Bogdan without the "g" or "h" sound as evidenced that some of the people with this name celebrate their nameday on the 6th or 7 January around Orthodox Christmas (Koleda).

It may refer to:

- Slobodan Aligrudić (1934–1985), Serbian actor
- Slobo Ilijevski (1949-2008), Macedonian-American goalkeeper in the North American Soccer and Major Indoor Soccer Leagues
- Slobodan Jovanović (1869–1958), Serbian politician during World War II
- Slobodan Kačar (born 1957), retired Serbian boxer
- Slobodan Komljenović (born 1971), retired German-born Yugoslav footballer
- Slobodan Lalović (1954–2023), Serbian politician
- Slobodan Milosavljević (1943–2025), Yugoslav-born French footballer
- Slobodan St. Milosavljević (born 1965), Serbian economist and politician
- Slobodan Milošević (1941–2006), former president of Yugoslavia and Serbia
- Slobodan Nikić (born 1983), Serbian water polo player, Olympic champion
- Slobodan Novak (1924–2016), Croatian writer
- Slobodan Prosperov Novak (born 1951), Croatian writer
- Slobodan Obradov (1918–2013), Serbian physician
- Slobodan Praljak (1945–2017), Croatian writer, director and one of the leaders of Herzeg-Bosnia during the War in Bosnia and Herzegovina
- Slobodan Rajković (born 1989), Serbian football player
- Slobodan Rakitić (1940–2013), Serbian writer and politician
- Slobodan Santrač (1946–2016), Serbian football manager
- Slobodan Šijan (born 1946), Serbian film director
- Slobodan Šnajder (born 1948), Croatian writer
- Slobodan Subotić (born 1956), Montenegro-born Slovenian basketball player
- Slobodan Uzelac (born 1947), Croatian politician representing Serbs of Croatia, member of Prime Minister Jadranka Kosor's cabinet
- Slobodan Vuksanović (born 1965), Serbian poet, essayist, translator and politician
- Slobodan Živojinović (born 1963), former Serbian tennis player

== See also ==
- Serbian names
