= Umberto Mastroianni =

Italian sculptor

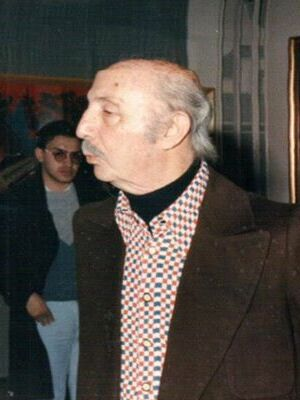
Umberto Mastroianni

Umberto Mastroianni (September 21, 1910 in Fontana Liri – February 25, 1998 in Marino, Italy), was an Italian abstract sculptor. In 1989, he received the first Praemium Imperiale for sculpture. During World War II, he was in the Italian resistance movement.

He was the uncle of the actor Marcello Mastroianni and the film editor Ruggero Mastroianni. The Museo Civico Umberto Mastroianni was established in his honour.

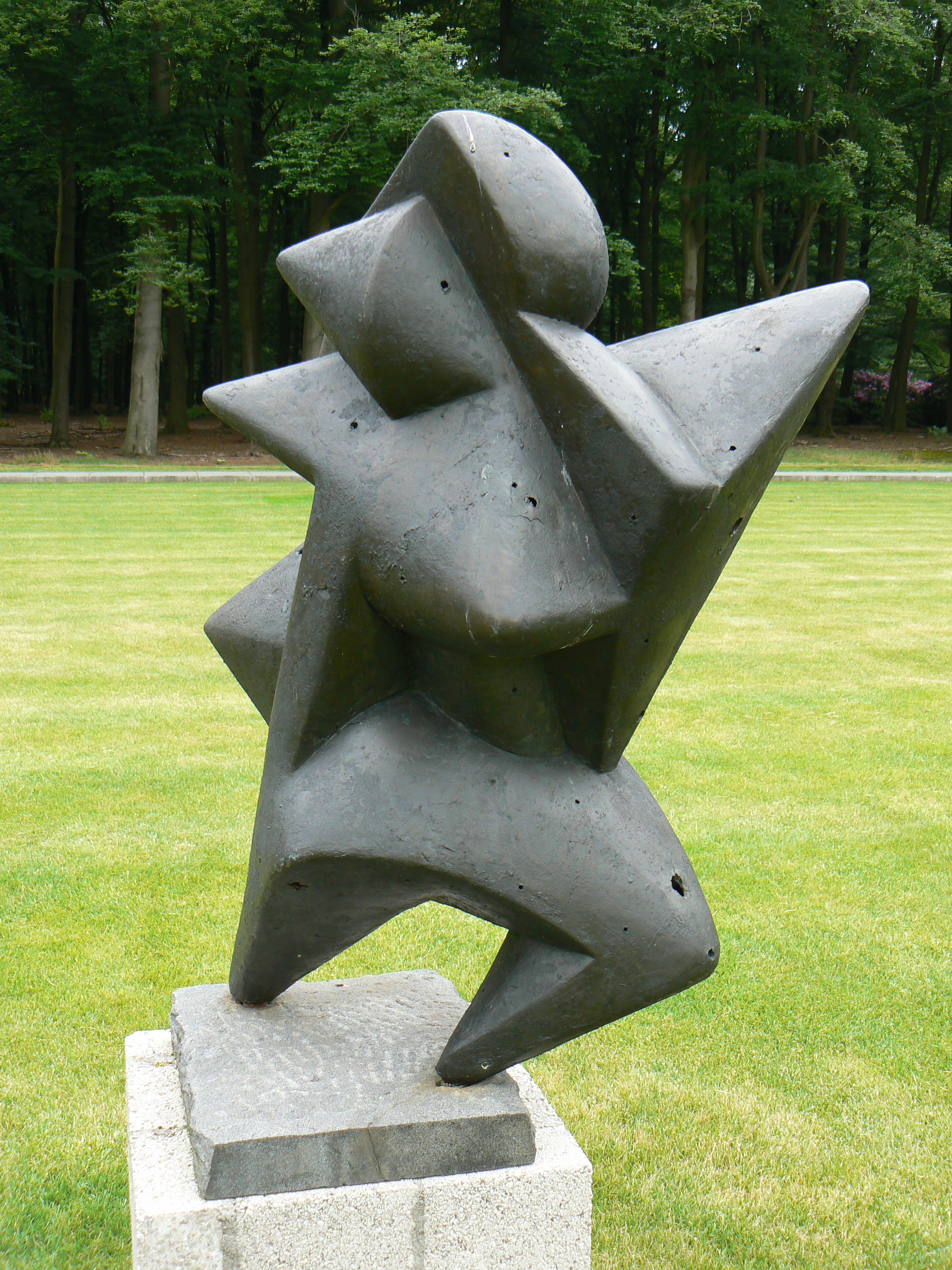
La Conquista (1954), Kröller-Müller Museum
