= Rocca d'Arce =

- Comune
- Comune di Rocca d'Arce
- Coat of arms

- Location within Italy Location within Lazio
- Coordinates: 41°35′15″N 13°35′05″E
- Country: Italy
- Region: Lazio
- Province: Frosinone (FR)
- Frazioni: Fraioli, Giardini, Murata, Pantanone

Government
  - Mayor: Rocco Pantanella

Area
  - Total: 11.8 km^{2} (4.6 sq mi)
- Elevation: 507 m (1,663 ft)

Population (28 February 2015)
  - Total: 957
  - Density: 81.1/km^{2} (210/sq mi)
- Demonym: Rocchigiani
- Time zone: UTC+1 (CET)
  - Summer (DST): UTC+2 (CEST)
- Postal code: 03030
- Dialing code: 0776
- Patron saint: St. Bernardo Pellegrino
- Saint day: September 13
- Website: Official website

Rocca d'Arce is a comune (municipality) in the Province of Frosinone in the Italian region Lazio, located about 100 kilometres (62 mi) southeast of Rome and about 20 kilometres (12 mi) southeast of Frosinone.

Rocca d'Arce borders the following municipalities: Arce, Colfelice, Fontana Liri, Roccasecca, Santopadre.

== History ==
According to the archeologist Italo Biddittu, human presence is evidenced during the Copper Age, whilst a settlement arose in the Iron Age.

The Volsci built a fortress around the mountain, still partially visible today. Due to its strategic position, the fortress had a moderate importance in the medieval period.

== Demographics ==
According to the 2011 census, there were 971 inhabitants.
