= Eleutherius of Rocca d'Arce =

Saint Eleutherius of Rocca d'Arce
- Born: England
- Died: Rocca d'Arce
- Venerated in: Roman Catholic Church
- Feast: May 29
- Patronage: Arce; Rocca d'Arce

Eleutherius of Rocca d'Arce (12th century?) was, according to tradition, an English pilgrim who died at Rocca d'Arce and was afterwards venerated as a saint. Tradition also makes him a brother of Grimwald and Fulk (possibly Grimoaldus and Fulk, both also according to tradition 12th century Englishmen who relocated to and died in Italy). Little is known about him.
