= Segundo Blanco =

Spanish anarchist politician, teacher and militant

Segundo Blanco González
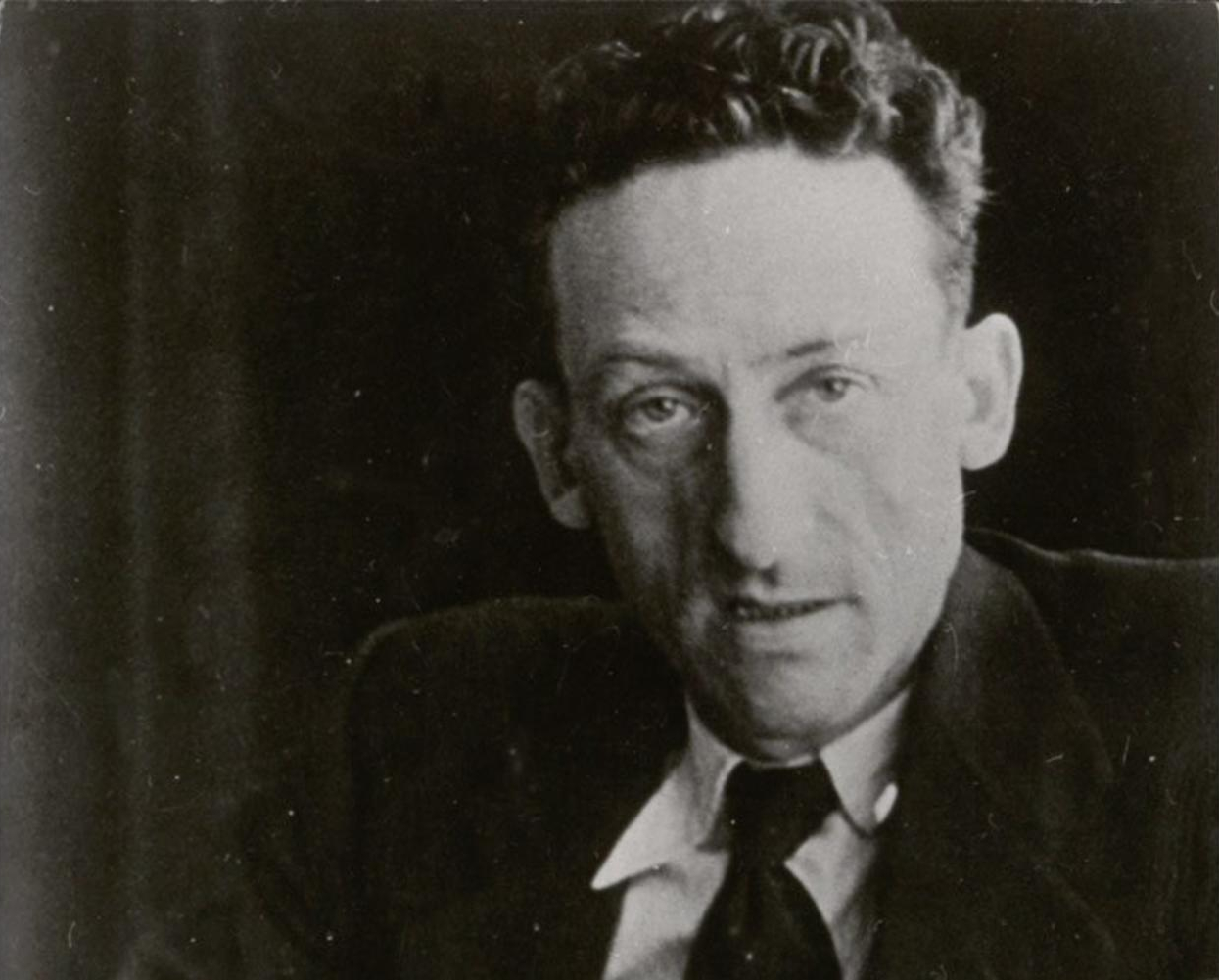
- Blanco (c. 1938)

Minister of Education and Minister of Health of Spain
- In office 5 April 1938 – 1 April 1939
- President: Manuel Azaña
- Prime Minister: Juan Negrín
- Preceded by: Jesús Hernández Tomás

Minister of Industry of Asturias and León
- In office 24 December 1936 – 21 October 1937
- President: Belarmino Tomás
- Preceded by: José Antonio Tourman Álvarez
- Succeeded by: Position abolished

General Secretary of the Confederación Nacional del Trabajo
- In office July 1926 – December 1926
- Preceded by: Avelino González Mallada
- Succeeded by: Joan Peiró

Personal details
- Born: 1899 Gijón, Spain
- Died: 1957 (aged 57–58) Mexico
- Occupation: Quantity surveyor and teacher

Segundo Blanco González (Gijón 1899 – Mexico 1957) was an Asturian anarchist, teacher and CNT militant that participated in the governance of various republican institutions, during the Spanish Civil War.

== Biography ==
Segundo Blanco González was born in 1899 in Gijón, a town with a strong anarchist presence. He worked in construction as a master rigger and completed his studies in teaching, although his early militant activity did not allow him to practice teaching. From a very young age, he became one of the most prominent militants of the Asturian CNT, in which there was a large payroll of anarchists of merit headed by Eleuterio Quintanilla.

In 1926, during the Dictatorship of Primo de Rivera, he was elected Regional General Secretary of Asturias, León and Palencia and edited the Confederation's publication, Solidaridad. That same year he was replaced at the head of the CNT National Committee by Juan Peiró, after Segundo Blanco was arrested and tortured in December 1926 by Commander Lisardo Doval, who gained infamy in the repression of the Asturian Commune. It was his first admission to prison, being imprisoned again in 1931 and 1934.

After the proclamation of the Second Spanish Republic, he participated in the CNT Congress of 1931, where he presided over some of the sessions, and at the beginning of the Spanish Civil War he chaired the Gijón War Committee that the city had established. Shortly after the creation of the Interprovincial Council of Asturias and León, he was appointed Minister of Industry, remaining in office until the fall of Gijón, on 21 October 1937. He was also part of the War Commission once it became the Sovereign Council of Asturias and León.

He managed to escape to France and then went to Revolutionary Catalonia. From there, he rejoined the fight in Valencia, where he was responsible for Defense on the CNT National Committee. In April 1938 he joined the government of Juan Negrín, occupying the ministries of Education and Public Health. His activity in these positions was marked by a lack of means and difficulty attending to the basic services of a population that decreased with each military setback, in a territory that was constantly fracturing.

Shortly before the end of the war, Blanco went to the Central zone. On 3 March 1939, he warned the Madrid anarchist committees that Negrín did not intend to replace Segismundo Casado, an anti-communist republican colonel. His warnings ignored, the events were precipitated by Casado's coup and the definitive collapse of the Republic.

After the Civil War, Segundo Blanco crossed the Pyrenees again and settled in the city of Orléans. The invasion of France by the armies of Nazi Germany led him to move to Mexico, where he died in 1957. During his exile he aligned himself with the political fraction of the libertarian movement that defended unity of action with political parties, maintaining for a time his position in the governments of Juan Negrín, for which he was expelled from the CNT.

== Bibliography ==
- Bolloten, Burnett (1991), The Spanish Civil War: Revolution and Counterrrevolution, UNC Press.
- Alexander, Robert (1999), Anarchists in the Spanish Civil War: Volume 2, Janus.
- Fernández-Rua, J. (2007), Historia de la Segunda República: 1931–1939, Giner.
- Thomas, H. (1976), La guerra Civil Española, Grijalbo.
