= Jeffrey Flier =

American physician

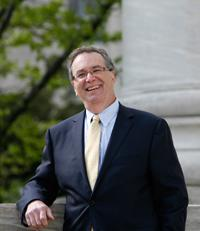

21st Dean of the Harvard Medical School
- In office September 1, 2007 – July 31, 2016

Personal details
- Born: Jeffrey Scott Flier; February 27, 1948 (age 78) New York, New York
- Spouse: Eleftheria Maratos-Flier
- Children: 2
- Education: City College of New York (BA); Mount Sinai School of Medicine (MD)
- Website: Dean of the Faculty of Medicine

Jeffrey Scott Flier is an American physician, endocrinologist; widely cited scientist; the Higginson Professor of Medicine and Physiology at Harvard Medical School; and a Distinguished Service Professor at the same institution. He was the 21st Dean of the Faculty of Medicine at Harvard University from 2007 to 2016.

== Early life and career ==
Flier was born in New York City, and grew up in the Pelham Parkway section of the Bronx. He is the son of Milton R. Flier, a World War II C-47 pilot and businessperson, and Dorothy (Kroll) Flier, who taught junior high school mathematics. He graduated in 1964 from the Bronx High School of Science, and 1968 from the City College of New York. He was in the first entering class of the Mount Sinai School of Medicine in 1968, and graduated in 1972 with the Elster Prize for highest academic standing. After two years of internal medicine residency at Mount Sinai Hospital, he spent four years in the Public Health Service as a clinical associate at the National Institutes of Health, completing training in endocrinology and launching a research career. He moved to Boston in 1978, becoming an assistant professor of medicine at Harvard Medical School, and chief of the Diabetes Unit at Harvard-affiliated Beth Israel Hospital. He subsequently became chief of the hospital's Endocrinology Division, vice chair for research of the Department of Medicine, and eventually the hospital's chief academic officer in 2002, overseeing research and educational affairs. At Harvard Medical School, he became the George C. Reisman Professor of Medicine, and Harvard faculty dean for Academic Affairs at what became the Beth Israel Deaconess Medical Center. At BIDMC he served as a Chief Academic Officer from 2002 to 2007.

== Dean of Harvard's Faculty of Medicine ==
Flier was appointed Dean of the Faculty of Medicine and the Caroline Shields Walker professor of medicine at Harvard in July 2007 by President Drew Faust and assumed the position on September 1, 2007. During his first year as dean, he led an extensive strategic planning process, releasing a report in October 2008. Harvard University and Harvard Medical School suffered financial losses when financial markets fell in 2008–2009. This slowed but did not stop investments in several areas. His term as dean of Harvard Medical School ended in 2016 after nine years.

Some of the corporate accomplishments corresponding to his period as a Dean were: 1. implementation of a new Clinical and Translational Science Award from NIH; 2. successful launch and oversight of the $750 million “The World is Waiting” capital campaign; 3. implementation of a major redesign of the preclinical medical curriculum; 4. design and implementation of a new system for financial contributions to HMS from its affiliated institutions; 5. establishment of a new department of biomedical informatics; 6. establishment of a new division of external education, combining Harvard Health Publishing, postgraduate medical education, and new HMS online learning and executive education programs designed to increase the global impact and educational revenues of the institution. Flier's 2016 final class commencement speech at Harvard Medical School is available online.

== Research contributions ==
While at the Diabetes Branch of NIH, under the mentorship of Jesse Roth, Philip Gorden, and C. Ronald Kahn, Flier discovered the existence of autoantibodies to the insulin receptor as a cause of severe insulin resistance. This discovery elucidated a rare cause of diabetes, advanced the field of membrane receptor biology and provided an important tool for research on insulin action. Flier also played a major role in defining genetic causes of insulin resistance by identifying and characterizing mutations in the insulin receptor gene in a subset of patients with severe insulin resistance. Much of his research has addressed the pathophysiology of obesity; In 1993, he described the dynamics of obesity in a brown-fat deficient, transgenic mouse model; His most extensive work has related to the biology and pathophysiology of leptin, its physiological role in starvation, and the molecular mechanisms of leptin resistance in obesity. With Maratos-Flier, he studied the participation of neuropeptide MCH in feeding behavior and energy balance; and the role of FGF21 in metabolic regulation. With Bruce Spiegelman he discovered an altered production of adipsin in obesity in genetically obese mice. In 2005, he reported the possible role of adult hypothalamic neurogenesis in the control of energy balance; Regarding inflammatory phenomena in metabolic disease, Flier helped establish that Toll-like receptor 4 (TLR4) activation in adipocytes and macrophages mediates inflammation accompanying obesity, and subsequent insulin resistance in diabetes. In 1980 he described a rare case of familial acanthosis nigricans-muscle cramps-acral enlargement syndrome.

== Opinion ==
Since stepping down as dean, Flier has increasingly contributed policy-oriented publications focusing on a number of issues affecting health care and biomedical research in current times, among them: health care reform and its sustainability, enhancing US health provider workforce, the pros and cons of prevailing credit attribution practices in academia and industry, the realities and options linked to the irreproducibility of research results, improving the institutional handling of scientific misconduct, the obsolescence of distinctions between basic and translational biomedical research, and the complexities behind conflict of interest (COI) disclosure.

Flier has questioned blanket approaches toward DEI (diversity, equity, inclusion) initiatives. He does not support mandatory diversity statements in faculty applications. He does not support the removal of historic portraits in universities (which are predominantly of white men) in order to provide more inclusive environments for historically underrepresented populations, like women and minorities. Flier says he wants fairness for all, and he has critiqued what he calls “the harmful cancel culture”. He and other leaders have asked for a more favorable adjudication for David M. Sabatini, a biologist who was fired by the Howard Hughes Medical Institute and resigned from the Whitehead Institute and MIT following an allegation of sexual misconduct.

== Personal life ==
Flier is married to Eleftheria Maratos-Flier. She is an endocrinologist and Professor of Medicine at Harvard Medical School, and currently a director of clinical research at Alnylam Pharmaceuticals. The two have collaborated in several areas of research. They have two daughters, Sarah and Lydia, both of whom are physicians.

== Honors/affiliations/awards ==
- Institute of Medicine of the National Academies of Science
- American Academy of Arts and Sciences
- American Society for Clinical Investigation
- Association of American Physicians
- Eli Lilly Award, American Diabetes Association
- Banting Medal, American Diabetes Association
- Solomon Berson Lecture, American Physiological Society
- Albert Renold Award, American Diabetes Association
- Astwood Lecture, Endocrine Society
- Honorary Doctor of Science, University of Athens
- Doctor of Science, Honoris Causa, University of Edinburgh
- Advisory Council, National Institutes of Diabetes and Digestive and Kidney Diseases, NIH

== Selected works ==
=== Biomedical Research ===
Flier has published over 350 research papers papers and subject reviews, which have been jointly cited over 110.000 times, his overall h-index is 150.

==== Most cited original research ====
His most cited original research papers are:

- Frederich, R. C.; Hamann, A.; Anderson, S.; Löllmann, B.; Lowell, B. B.; Flier, J. S. (1995-12). "Leptin levels reflect body lipid content in mice: evidence for diet-induced resistance to leptin action". Nature Medicine. 1 (12): 1311–1314. doi:10.1038/nm1295-1311. ISSN 1078-8956. PMID 7489415. Cited 1998 times, June 2022
- Ahima, R. S.; Prabakaran, D.; Mantzoros, C.; Qu, D.; Lowell, B.; Maratos-Flier, E.; Flier, J. S. (1996-07-18). "Role of leptin in the neuroendocrine response to fasting". Nature. 382 (6588): 250–252. doi:10.1038/382250a0. ISSN 0028-0836. PMID 8717038. Cited 3870 times, June 2022
- Masuzaki, H.; Paterson, J.; Shinyama, H.; Morton, N. M.; Mullins, J. J.; Seckl, J. R.; Flier, J. S. (2001-12-07). "A transgenic model of visceral obesity and the metabolic syndrome". Science. 294 (5549): 2166–2170. doi:10.1126/science.1066285. ISSN 0036-8075. PMID 11739957. Cited 227 times, June 2022
- Shi, Hang; Kokoeva, Maia V.; Inouye, Karen; Tzameli, Iphigenia; Yin, Huali; Flier, Jeffrey S. (2006–11). "TLR4 links innate immunity and fatty acid-induced insulin resistance". The Journal of Clinical Investigation. 116 (11): 3015–3025. doi:10.1172/JCI28898. ISSN 0021-9738. PMC 1616196. PMID 17053832. Cited 3854 times, June 2022
- Badman, Michael K.; Pissios, Pavlos; Kennedy, Adam R.; Koukos, George; Flier, Jeffrey S.; Maratos-Flier, Eleftheria (2007-06). "Hepatic fibroblast growth factor 21 is regulated by PPARalpha and is a key mediator of hepatic lipid metabolism in ketotic states". Cell Metabolism. 5 (6): 426–437. doi:10.1016/j.cmet.2007.05.002. ISSN 1932-7420. PMID 17550778. Cited 1516 times, June 2022
- Fisher, Ffolliott M.; Kleiner, Sandra; Douris, Nicholas; Fox, Elliott C.; Mepani, Rina J.; Verdeguer, Francisco; Wu, Jun; Kharitonenkov, Alexei; Flier, Jeffrey S.; Maratos-Flier, Eleftheria; Spiegelman, Bruce M. (2012-02-01). "FGF21 regulates PGC-1α and browning of white adipose tissues in adaptive thermogenesis". Genes & Development. 26 (3): 271–281. doi:10.1101/gad.177857.111. ISSN 1549-5477. PMC 3278894. PMID 22302939. Cited 1373 times, June 2022

==== Most cited subject reviews ====
- Spiegelman, B. M.; Flier, J. S. (1996-11-01). "Adipogenesis and obesity: rounding out the big picture". Cell. 87 (3): 377–389. doi:10.1016/s0092-8674(00)81359-8. ISSN 0092-8674. PMID 8898192. Cited 1615 times, June 2022
- Ahima, R. S.; Flier, J. S. (2000). "Leptin". Annual Review of Physiology. 62: 413–437. doi:10.1146/annurev.physiol.62.1.413. ISSN 0066-4278. PMID 10845097. Cited 2606 times, June 2022
- Kahn, Barbara B.; Flier, Jeffrey S. (2000-08-15). "Obesity and insulin resistance". Journal of Clinical Investigation. 106 (4): 473–481. doi:10.1172/JCI10842. ISSN 0021-9738. PMC 380258. PMID 10953022. Cited 4115 times, June 2022
- Spiegelman, B. M.; Flier, J. S. (2001-02-23). "Obesity and the regulation of energy balance". Cell. 104 (4): 531–543. doi:10.1016/s0092-8674(01)00240-9. ISSN 0092-8674. PMID 11239410. Cited 2993 times, June 2022
- Kershaw, Erin E.; Flier, Jeffrey S. (2004–06). "Adipose tissue as an endocrine organ". The Journal of Clinical Endocrinology and Metabolism. 89 (6): 2548–2556. doi:10.1210/jc.2004-0395. ISSN 0021-972X. PMID 15181022. Cited 6496 times, June 2022
- Flier, Jeffrey S. (2004-01-23). "Obesity wars: molecular progress confronts an expanding epidemic". Cell. 116 (2): 337–350. doi:10.1016/s0092-8674(03)01081-x. ISSN 0092-8674. PMID 14744442. Cited 1589 times, June 2022.

==== Most recent biomedical papers ====
- Flier, Jeffrey S.; Maratos-Flier, Eleftheria (2017-07-05). "Leptin's Physiologic Role: Does the Emperor of Energy Balance Have No Clothes?". Cell Metabolism. 26 (1): 24–26. doi:10.1016/j.cmet.2017.05.013. ISSN 1932-7420. PMID 28648981
- Douris, Nicholas; Desai, Bhavna N.; Fisher, Ffolliott M.; Cisu, Theodore; Fowler, Alan J.; Zarebidaki, Eleen; Nguyen, Ngoc Ly T.; Morgan, Donald A.; Bartness, Timothy J.; Rahmouni, Kamal; Flier, Jeffrey S. (2017-08). "Beta-adrenergic receptors are critical for weight loss but not for other metabolic adaptations to the consumption of a ketogenic diet in male mice". Molecular Metabolism. 6 (8): 854–862. doi:10.1016/j.molmet.2017.05.017. ISSN 2212-8778. PMC 5518722. PMID 28752049
- Desai, Bhavna N.; Singhal, Garima; Watanabe, Mikiko; Stevanovic, Darko; Lundasen, Thomas; Fisher, Ffolliott M.; Mather, Marie L.; Vardeh, Hilde G.; Douris, Nicholas; Adams, Andrew C.; Nasser, Imad A. (2017-11). "Fibroblast growth factor 21 (FGF21) is robustly induced by ethanol and has a protective role in ethanol associated liver injury". Molecular Metabolism. 6 (11): 1395–1406. doi:10.1016/j.molmet.2017.08.004. ISSN 2212-8778. PMC 5681240. PMID 29107287
- Singhal, Garima; Kumar, Gaurav; Chan, Suzanne; Fisher, Ffolliott M.; Ma, Yong; Vardeh, Hilde G.; Nasser, Imad A.; Flier, Jeffrey S.; Maratos-Flier, Eleftheria (2018-07). "Deficiency of fibroblast growth factor 21 (FGF21) promotes hepatocellular carcinoma (HCC) in mice on a long term obesogenic diet". Molecular Metabolism. 13: 56–66. doi:10.1016/j.molmet.2018.03.002. ISSN 2212-8778. PMC 6026320. PMID 29753678
- Watanabe, Mikiko; Singhal, Garima; Fisher, Ffolliott M.; Beck, Thomas C.; Morgan, Donald A.; Socciarelli, Fabio; Mather, Marie L.; Risi, Renata; Bourke, Jared; Rahmouni, Kamal; McGuinness, Owen P. (2020-01). "Liver-derived FGF21 is essential for full adaptation to ketogenic diet but does not regulate glucose homeostasis". Endocrine. 67 (1): 95–108. doi:10.1007/s12020-019-02124-3. ISSN 1559-0100. PMC 7948212. PMID 31728756
- Flier, Jeffrey S. (2020-05-01). "Might β3-adrenergic receptor agonists be useful in disorders of glucose homeostasis?". The Journal of Clinical Investigation. 130 (5): 2180–2182. doi:10.1172/JCI136476. ISSN 1558-8238. PMC 7190986. PMID 32202511

=== Recent policy papers ===
- Flier, Jeffrey S. (2019). "Credit and Priority in Scientific Discovery: A Scientist's Perspective". Perspectives in Biology and Medicine. 62 (2): 189–215. doi:10.1353/pbm.2019.0010. ISSN 1529-8795
- Flier, Jeffrey S. (2019-06-03). "Academia and industry: allocating credit for discovery and development of new therapies". The Journal of Clinical Investigation. 129 (6): 2172–2174. doi:10.1172/JCI129122. ISSN 0021-9738
- Flier, Jeffrey S.; Rhoads, Jared M. (2020). "The US Health Provider Workforce: Determinants and Potential Paths to Enhancement". Perspectives in Biology and Medicine. 63 (4): 644–668. doi:10.1353/pbm.2020.0053. ISSN 1529-8795. PMID 33416803
- Flier, Jeffrey S. (2021). "Misconduct in Bioscience Research: a 40-year perspective". Perspectives in Biology and Medicine. 64 (4): 437–456. doi:10.1353/pbm.2021.0035. ISSN 1529-8795
