= Uelliton =

Brazilian footballer

Personal information
- Full name: Uelliton da Silva Vieira
- Date of birth: 28 August 1987 (age 39)
- Place of birth: Monte Santo, Brazil
- Height: 1.72 m (5 ft 8 in)
- Position: Defensive midfielder

Team information
- Current team: Avaí

Youth career
- 2007: Vitória

Senior career*
Years	Team	Apps	(Gls)
2007–2012	Vitória	88	(4)
2007	→ Itaúna (loan)		
2008	→ Gama (loan)		
2013–	Cruzeiro	0	(0)
2013	→ Coritiba (loan)	6	(0)
2014	→ Bahia (loan)	19	(0)
2015–	→ Avaí (loan)	0	(0)
- * Club domestic league appearances and goals

Uelliton da Silva Vieira (born 28 August 1987), simply known as Uelliton, is a Brazilian footballer who plays as a defensive midfielder for Avaí, on loan from Cruzeiro.
