= Lefteris Nikolaou-Alavanos =

Greek politician (born 1985)

Lefteris Nikolaou-Alavanos MEP
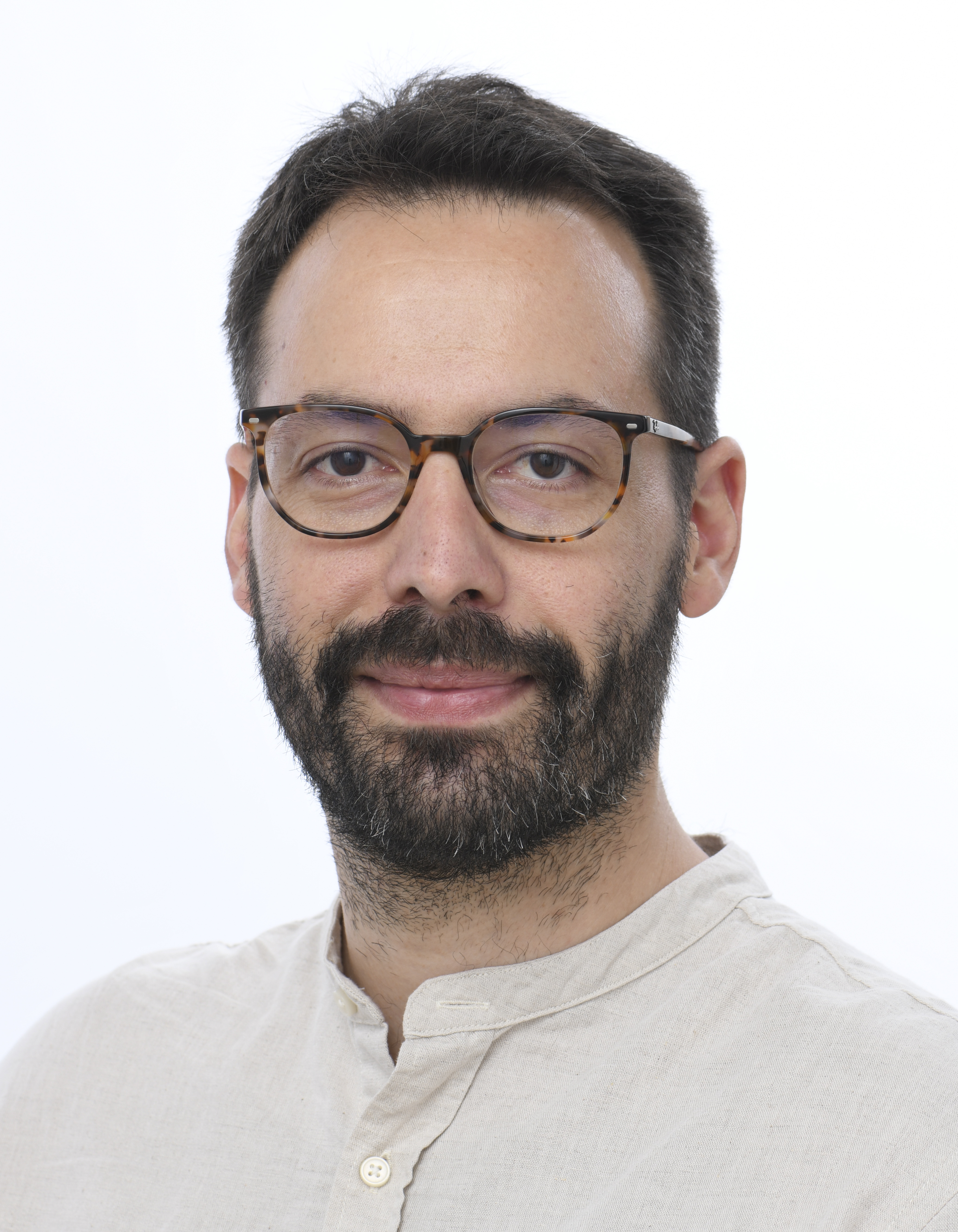
- Official portrait, 2024

Member of the European Parliament for Greece
- Incumbent
- Assumed office 2 July 2019

Personal details
- Born: 2 July 1985 (age 41) Athens, Greece
- Party: Communist Party of Greece

Lefteris Nikolaou-Alavanos (Greek: Λευτέρης Νικολάου-Αλαβάνος, born 2 July 1985) is a Greek politician currently serving as a Member of the European Parliament for the Communist Party of Greece.

On 15 September 2022, he was one of 16 MEPs who voted against condemning Nicaragua, for the arrest of Bishop Rolando Álvarez.
