= Agios Eleftherios =

Agios Eleftherios may refer to a neighbourhood, two villages and one church in Greece:

- Agios Eleftherios, Athens, a neighbourhood of Athens
- Agios Eleftherios, Kefalonia, a village on Kefalonia
- Agios Eleftherios, Larissa, a village in the Larissa regional unit
- Agios Eleftherios Church, Athens (Mikri Mitrópoli), a Byzantine church in Athens
