= Eleftheria Mavrogeni =

Greek handball player (born 1970)

Eleftheria Mavrogeni (born 12 May 1970 in Veria) is a Greek handball player who competed in the 2004 Summer Olympics.

At club level she played for APS Makedonikos.
