= Ângelo Carvalho =

Portuguese footballer

Personal information
- Full name: Ângelo Ferreira Carvalho
- Date of birth: 3 August 1925
- Place of birth: Portugal
- Date of death: 8 October 2008 (aged 83)
- Position: Defender

Senior career*
Years	Team	Apps	(Gls)
1946–1955	Porto	219	(1)
1957–1958	Salgueiros	14	(0)

International career
1950–1955	Portugal	15	(0)
- * Club domestic league appearances and goals

Ângelo Ferreira Carvalho (3 August 1925 – 8 October 2008), was a Portuguese footballer who played for FC Porto, as defender.

== International career ==
Carvalho gained 15 caps for the Portugal national team and made his debut 9 April 1950 in Lisbon, a 2-2 draw against Spain in the Qualification for the 1950 World Cup.

== Club career ==
Carvalho played for Sport Lisboa e Benfica for fourteen years. He made his first team-debut in 1943 at a young age and soon established himself as a key figure in the midfield. During his time at Benfica he won multiple Primeira Liga and several Taca de Portugal titles. After his long stint with Benfica, Carvalho moved to G.D. Estoril Praia in 1957 where he played for a few more years until 1960 before retiring from professional football.

== Post-Retirement ==
After retiring from playing, Carvalho took on several coaching roles in the Portuguese football scene. He worked with lower division clubs and helped develop the next generation of the nation's football players. He died on October 8, 2008 at 83 years old, most likely due to natural causes.
