= Eleftheria Maratos-Flier =

American endocrinologist

Eleftheria Maratos-Flier is an American endocrinologist, and emerita Professor of Medicine at Harvard Medical School, best known for her expertise in the pathophysiology and prevention of obesity-related metabolic disorders, and for her discoveries on the neuroendocrine control of feeding behaviour. She is a contributing author to known textbooks and reviews in internal medicine, endocrinology, and physiology. Her marriage with professor Jeffrey Flier, was noted by Forbes as a lasting and productive bond between eminent medical scholars. They have two adult daughters who are also physicians. She is also known as Terry Maratos-Flier.

== Education ==
In 1972, she graduated with a BA in Chemistry from New York University, New York, NY. In 1976, she graduated as an MD from the Mount Sinai School of Medicine, New York, NY, followed by internship and residency training in internal medicine at George Washington University Hospital, Washington, DC. In Massachusetts (1978-1981), she pursued further residency training in internal medicine at Beth Israel Hospital, postdoctoral research fellowship at Harvard School of Public Health, and Clinical Fellowship at the Joslin Diabetes Center and Brigham and Women’s Hospital.

== Career ==
Since 1982 she has taught at Harvard Medical School, becoming a full Professor of Medicine from 2010 to 2018, when she became professor emerita. She has been an associate member of the Broad Institute, and a Principal Investigator of many NIH-funded research grants. She has also been an attending endocrinologist at Beth Israel Deaconess Medical Center, where she still provides care for patients with metabolic disease. From 2018, she has been Director, Translational Medicine, at Novartis Institutes of Biomedical Research, Cambridge, MA., recently moving to Alnylam to serve as a director of clinical research. She has authored more than 100 peer-reviewed papers, most of them studying aspects of obesity and type II diabetes in experimental mouse models, and also in clinical disease. She also authored the obesity chapters of the 20th edition of Harrison's Principles of Internal Medicine (jointly with Jeffrey Flier), and the 14th edition of Williams Textbook of Endocrinology. In 2016, she contributed an article to the Annual Review of Physiology on the physiology of Fibroblast Growth Factor 21.

=== Awards ===
- 1971 - Undergraduate Award in Analytical Chemistry from the ACS to outstanding undergraduate chemistry students.
- 2011 - Saul Horowitz Distinguished Alumni Award, given for outstanding achievements since graduation from the Icahn School of Medicine at Mount Sinai.
- 2020 - Roy O. Greep Award for Outstanding Research given by the Endocrine Society.

== Selected works ==
Maratos-Flier's research papers have been cited over 15,600 times. Her most cited papers are:

- Qu, Daqing; Ludwig, David S.; Gammeltoft, Steen; Piper, Megan; Pelleymounter, Mary Ann; Cullen, Mary Jane; Mathes, Wendy Foulds; Przypek, Jeanne; Kanarek, Robin; Maratos-Flier, Eleftheria (1996-03-01). "A role for melanin-concentrating hormone in the central regulation of feeding behaviour". Nature. 380 (6571): 243–247. doi:10.1038/380243a0.PMID 8637571.
- Ahima, Rexford S.; Prabakaran, Daniel; Mantzoros, Christos; Qu, Daqing; Lowell, Bradford; Maratos-Flier, Eleftheria; Flier, Jeffrey S. (1996-07-01). "Role of leptin in the neuroendocrine response to fasting". Nature. 382 (6588): 250–252. doi:10.1038/382250a0. PMID 8717038.
- Badman, Michael K.; Pissios, Pavlos; Kennedy, Adam R.; Koukos, George; Flier, Jeffrey S.; Maratos-Flier, Eleftheria (2007-06-01). "Hepatic Fibroblast Growth Factor 21 Is Regulated by PPARα and Is a Key Mediator of Hepatic Lipid Metabolism in Ketotic States". Cell Metabolism. 5 (6): 426–437. doi:10.1016/j.cmet.2007.05.002. PMID 17550778.
- Fisher, ffolliott M.; Kleiner, Sandra; Douris, Nicholas; Fox, Elliott C.; Mepani, Rina J.; Verdeguer, Francisco; Wu, Jun; Kharitonenkov, Alexei; Flier, Jeffrey S.; Maratos-Flier, Eleftheria; Spiegelman, Bruce M. (2012-02-01). "FGF21 regulates PGC-1α and browning of white adipose tissues in adaptive thermogenesis". Genes & Development. 26 (3): 271–281. doi:10.1101/gad.177857.111. PMID 22302939
