= Nirley =

Brazilian footballer

Personal information
- Full name: Nirley da Silva Fonseca
- Date of birth: 9 April 1988 (age 38)
- Place of birth: Itaocara, Rio de Janeiro, Brazil
- Height: 1.86 m (6 ft 1 in)
- Position: Centre back

Senior career*
| Years | Team | Apps | (Gls) |
| 2010 | Americano | | |
| 2011–2013 | Criciúma | 34 | (2) |
| 2013 | → Cruzeiro (loan) | 0 | (0) |
| 2013 | → Figueirense (loan) | 10 | (0) |
| 2014–2016 | Figueirense | 60 | (3) |
| 2017 | Náutico | 13 | (1) |
| 2017–2019 | Brasil de Pelotas | 20 | (1) |
| 2020–2022 | Confiança | 85 | (5) |
- * Club domestic league appearances and goals as of 13 August 2022

Nirley da Silva Fonseca (born 9 April 1988), simply known as Nirley, is a Brazilian footballer who plays as a centre back.

== Career ==
Nirley first played for Americano in Campeonato Carioca. His breakthrough came in 2011 when he moved to Criciúma, and made his national league debut on 15 June 2011 against ASA in a Campeonato Brasileiro Série B match. His debut game saw him pick up an injury, and he spent almost three months on the sidelines.

At the start of 2013, Nirley was loaned to Cruzeiro, but a lack of game-time saw him recalled and sign for Figueirense, initially on loan for the rest of 2013, but eventually on a three-year deal.

Nirley signed with Náutico for the 2017 season. He moved to Brasil de Pelotas in August 2017.
