= Vieirinha (footballer, born 1924) =

Portuguese footballer

Personal information
- Full name: Manuel Alberto Vieira
- Date of birth: 1 October 1924
- Place of birth: Lisbon, Portugal
- Date of death: 13 February 2015 (aged 90)
- Place of death: São Martinho do Porto, Portugal
- Position: Half-back

Youth career
- 1940–1942: GDS Cascais

Senior career*
Years	Team	Apps	(Gls)
1952–1952	Estoril Praia	160	(58)
1952–1955	Benfica	33	(5)
1955–1957	Lusitano de Évora	41	(0)
1957–1958	Farense		
Total		234	(63)

International career
1949	Portugal B	1	(0)

Managerial career
- 1962–1964: Peniche (under–19)
- 1966–1967: Porto (assistant)
- 1967–1968: Barreirense
- 1968–1969: FC Porto Juniors
- 1969–1970: Porto (assistant)
- 1969–1970: Porto (interim)
- 1977–1978: União de Tomar
- 1980–1981: GD Nazarenos
- 1981–1982: Beira-Mar
- * Club domestic league appearances and goals

Manuel Alberto Vieira (1 October 1924 – 13 February 2015), better known as Vieirinha, was a Portuguese footballer who played as a half-back.

Most of his playing career was spent at Estoril Praia, representing them from 1942 to 1952. He then joined Benfica afterwards and won the Taça de Portugal in his first year. After retiring, he embarked on a managerial career, passing through several clubs, but being more associated with Porto.

== Career ==
Born in Lisbon, Vierinha played his youth years at GDS Cascais, joining Estoril Praia in 1942 at age 18. He spent a full decade at Estoril Praia, playing over 160 games for them. In 1952, he signed with Benfica with manager Alberto Zozaya giving him his first start on the 28 September, against Vitória de Setúbal. He ended up playing 26 games, being the sixth most used player of the season, helping them win the Taça de Portugal. The following year, he fell out of the pecking order and his playing time was cut to just 14 games. He did not make any appearances for the first team in his last year, in 1954–55. After Benfica, Vierinha played in Lusitano de Évora when they were competing in the Primeira Divisão, and spent a year as player-manager at Farense.

He retired shortly after and started a managerial career, coaching the youth side of GD Peniche in 1962–63. In 1966–67, he was the assistant manager of José Maria Pedroto in Porto, and in the following year, he coached Barreirense. He managed FC Porto Juniors in 1968–69 and assisted Elek Schwartz in the first team in 1969-70, leading the team from 21 December to 8 February 1970, after Schwartz fell ill. In 1977–78, he managed Eusébio at União de Tomar.

His last known managerial role was in Beira-Mar in 1982, after which he moved to São Martinho do Porto, where he died at age 90 on 13 February 2015.

== Honours ==
Benfica

- Taça de Portugal:1952–53
