= Leandrinho (footballer, born 1985) =

Brazilian footballer

Personal information
- Full name: Leandro Eleutério de Souza
- Date of birth: February 22, 1985 (age 41)
- Place of birth: Araruama, Brazil
- Height: 1.88 m (6 ft 2 in)
- Position: Right back

Team information
- Current team: ASA

Senior career*
Years	Team	Apps	(Gls)
2005–2006	Bangu	0	(0)
2007	Catanduvense	0	(0)
2008–2009	São José	0	(0)
2010	Taubaté	0	(0)
2010	Mineiros	0	(0)
2011	Santacruzense	21	(1)
2011	Marília	7	(0)
2012	Corinthians-AL	0	(0)
2013	CSA	9	(0)
2013–2014	Cruzeiro	1	(0)
2013	→ Boa Esporte (loan)	1	(0)
2014	→ Nacional-MG (loan)	9	(0)
2014–	ASA		
- * Club domestic league appearances and goals

Leandro Eleutério de Souza or simply Leandrinho (born February 22, 1985, in Araruama), is a Brazilian right back. He currently plays for ASA.
