= Eleutério Santos =

Portuguese footballer

Eleutério
Personal information
- Full name: António Eleutério dos Santos
- Date of birth: 10 February 1928 (age 98)
- Place of birth: Portugal
- Position: Midfielder

Senior career*
Years	Team	Apps	(Gls)
- FC Porto

International career
1954	Portugal	1	(0)
- * Club domestic league appearances and goals

António Eleutério dos Santos (born 10 February 1928) simply Eleutério, is a former Portuguese footballer who played as a midfielder.
