= Eleutherius of Nicomedia =

Roman saint (fl. 3rd – 4th century)

St. Eleutherius of Nicomedia (died 303) was a soldier who was martyred under Diocletian. He was accused of trying to burn the palace of Diocletian. He was burned to death after being tortured alongside his companions. A large number of Christians were martyred alongside Eleutherius through various means, including fire and drowning. His feast day is October 2.

== In popular culture ==
- St. Eleutherius of Nicomedia is one of the saints that appears to come to life to chastise Reverend Lovejoy in the season 8 episode of The Simpsons, "In Marge We Trust".

== Sources ==
- saints.sqpn.com
- St. Eleutherius - Saints & Angels - Catholic Online
