= Eleuterio Quintanilla =

Spanish anarchist and teacher

Eleuterio Quintanilla Prieto (24 October 1886 – 18 January 1966) was an Asturian anarchist and freemason, educator and pupil of Francesc Ferrer. Quintanilla was a central member of the National Confederation of Labour (CNT) and lived in Spain until the end of the Spanish Civil War, when he went into exile in France.

== Biography ==
=== Youth ===
Eleuterio Quintanilla Prieto was born on 24 October 1884 in the Asturian city of Xixón. He studied at a public primary school, receiving high grades and finished his education early. At age thirteen, he began his first job as an apprentice chocolatier. During his apprenticeship, he continued his studies at a workers' college and took private lessons from an anarchist who served as his grammar teacher. In 1903, Quintanilla met Ricardo Mella at a conference, and he would later claim this meeting had a major impact on his interests in anarchism. In 1904, he began to be interested in linguistics.

=== Militancy ===
In 1904, Quintanilla began working as an orator in Xixón. The first rally in which he participated was in 1905 in Mieres. That same year, he began working for the working-class newspaper, Tiempos Nuevos. He also began writing for numerous publications, including: Tribuna Libre, El Libertario, and Solidaridad Obrera, eventually receiving his own column in the latter. In 1909, he participated in numerous rallies, and was imprisoned in July of that year during the Tragic Week in Barcelona. In 1910, he began constructing a town house in Xixón, and when he finished, he used it as a base of operations for his advocacy. That same year, he founded the weekly newspaper Acción Libertaria alongside Ricardo Mella; sometimes they would publish it under the name of El Libertario to bypass government censorship. In 1910 and 1911, Xixón saw an increased number of strikes and lockout protests; some of these protests resulted in a series of attacks and the arrests of employers, their employees, and protesters alike. Whilst being arrested, Quintanilla and Pedro Sierra were injured by police, leaving both unconscious. Pablo Iglesias, Melquíades Álvarez, and Gumersindo de Azcárate protested to the Canalejas government about Quintanilla and Sierra's treatment. In 1910, the National Confederation of Labour (CNT) was formed, with Quintanilla founding the Xixón section. The CNT was outlawed by the Spanish government the following year.

In 1914, Quintanilla abandoned his profession as a chocolatier to dedicate himself exclusively to teaching. He worked at a neutral school in Xixón, with José Luis García Rúa as a student. At the beginning of World War I, Quintanilla and Mella both declared themselves in support of the allies; this went against contemporary anarchists Peter Kropotkin, Jean Grave, and the official position of the CNT, who all remained neutral. This conflict led to a series of debates between the anarchist newspapers Tierra y Libertad and Acción Libertaria. In 1915, Quintanilla participated in a peace conference in Ferrol, where delegates successfully relaunched the CNT. In April 1916, he participated in a trade union congress in Xixón, where he proposed the merger of the CNT and the General Workers' Union (UGT). Only 10 July 1917, Quintanilla joined the Freemasons, Jovellanos lodge n. 337, adopting the pseudonym "Floreal". During the 1917 Spanish general strike, he called for unity of action, calling on the UGT and republican organisations to work together. In 1918, he attended a meeting of anarchist groups in Barcelona, where he further defended the integration and cooperation between different trade unions.

That same year, he attended the 3rd National Congress of the CNT in Madrid. Here, he again advocated for the CNT to merge with the UGT, as well as for the creation of industrial federations, and the distancing of the CNT from the Communist International. None of his proposals received sufficient support in the congress, which only approved a pact of collaboration between CNT and UGT. In 1920, Quintanilla denounced the collaboration pact that the UGT and the CNT had signed during the 3rd National Congress. Seemingly in opposition to his previous claims, he claimed that CNT had not upheld their end of the agreement, that they were becoming more opposed to collaboration with socialist unions, and that they had "abused" other collaborators.

Until 1925, Quintanilla distanced himself from trade union activity. Following the rise of the dictatorship of Primo de Rivera, Quintanilla rejoined the CNT, participating in debates over whether the union should seek legalisation or continue on as an underground entity. Quintanilla took the legalistic stance, and was noted to hold substantial influence over Segundo Blanco, the general secretary of the national committee. Despite his efforts, the CNT remained underground.

=== Republic, civil war, exile, and death ===
When the Spanish Second Republic formed, Quintanilla continued to distance himself from CNT. He no longer assumed positions, attended meetings, or collaborated with the anarchist press. He did write sporadically for opposition unions, defending the CNT's unity as a whole while continuing to argue in favour of the split that formed between the UGT and CNT since 1920. On 24 July 1931, in an interview with El Noroeste, he lamented about his desires for a Bolshevik-style revolution in Spain, but commented that the prospect was "remote". In 1933, he was expelled from the Freemason lodge due to an ongoing anarchist campaign against the masons and because the Iberian Anarchist Federation (which he was a member of) had declared themselves incompatible with freemasonry.

Quintanilla was in Xixón when the Spanish Civil War began, serving as member of the city's supply committee. During the war, he worked as a professor of philosophy. He was later assigned to the protection of the "artistic treasures of Asturias and Santander", a position that Segundo Blanco would eventually take over. In 1937, he requested to be reincorporated to the Freemasons. Following his tenure in protecting artwork, he served as the president of the National Council of Evacuated Children, eventually leaving Spain with a group of children and going into exile. During his exile, he and the children he accompanied would be incorporated into companies hiring foreign workers. He would then spend the rest of his life in Bordeaux, where he died on 18 January 1966.

== Bibliography ==
- Álvarez, Ramón (1973). Eleuterio Quintanilla. (Vida y obra del maestro) Contribución a la Historia del Sindicalismo Revolucionario en Asturias. México D.F. (in Spanish). Editores Mexicanos Unidos, S.A.
- Bar, Antonio (1981). La C.N.T. en los años rojos [The CNT in the red years.] (in Spanish). Madrid: Akal/Universitaria. ISBN 84-7339-577-8.
- Barrio Alonso, Ángeles (1986). Anarquismo en Asturias. 1890-1936 [Anarchism in Asturias (1890–1936)] (PhD) (in Spanish). University of Cantabria. ISBN 9788469446164.
- Cuadrat, Xavier (1976). Socialismo y anarquismo en Cataluña. Los orígenes de la CNT [Socialism and anarchism in Catalonia. The origins of the CNT.] (in Spanish). Madrid: Ediciones de la Revista de Trabajo. ISBN 84-500-1389-5.
- Padilla, Antonio. El movimiento anarquista español [The Spanish Anarchist Movement] (in Spanish). Barcelona: Planeta.
- Pozuelo Andrés, Yvàn (2012). La masonería en Asturias [Freemasonry in Asturias] (in Spanish). University of Oviedo. ISBN 978-84-8317-954-3.
