= Santopadre =

- Comune
- Comune di Santopadre
- Location within Italy Location within Lazio
- Coordinates: 41°36′N 13°38′E
- Country: Italy
- Region: Lazio
- Province: Frosinone (FR)
- Frazioni: Valle, Ciaiali, Collepizzuto, Madonna delle Fosse

Government
  - Mayor: Giampiero Forte (since 2019)

Area
  - Total: 21.6 km^{2} (8.3 sq mi)
- Elevation: 141 m (463 ft)

Population (April 2024)
  - Total: 1,168
  - Density: 54.1/km^{2} (140/sq mi)
- Demonym: Santopadresi
- Time zone: UTC+1 (CET)
  - Summer (DST): UTC+2 (CEST)
- Postal code: 03030
- Dialing code: 0776
- Patron saint: San Folco
- Saint day: May 22

Santopadre is a small town and comune in the province of Frosinone, Lazio region of Italy.

It served by its station on the Avezzano-Roccasecca railroad.
