= Sporting CP Esports =

Portuguese professional esports team

- Full name: Sporting Clube de Portugal Esports
- Short name: SCP Esports
- Game: FIFA
- Founded: 21 July 2016; 10 years ago
- Chairman: Frederico Varandas
- Head coach: Francisco Cruz
- Manager: Márcio Figueiredo
- Parent group: Sporting CP

Sporting Clube de Portugal Esports, commonly known as Sporting CP Esports, or simply SCP Esports, is a Portuguese professional esports team founded in 2016, based in Lisbon, Portugal.

The team is the esports department of Sporting CP.

== History ==
The Esports section of the club was founded on 21 July 2016 by former president Bruno de Carvalho, making it the first Portuguese multi-sport club to do it.

The first sport to be included in the new esports category was FIFA. The first player introduced was Francisco "Quinzas" Cruz, the first Portuguese to become FIFAe World Cup champion. Sporting CP Esports made its debut on July 31, 2016, against VfL Wolfsburg E-Sport, in a match played before the Troféu Cinco Violinos, which also opposed the men's football teams of Sporting CP and Vfl Wolfsburg. This match went down in esports history as the first ever between multi-sports clubs, was played on the FIFA 16 video game and ended in a 1-1 draw. On 7 September 2016, Sporting CP Esports created its first virtual tournament, named G2A Lion Games, played on FIFA 17, with the aim of recruiting the best players for its squad.

In the same year, on October 20, Sporting CP made history in esports once again by becoming the first multi-sports club to create a CS:GO tournament, with a prize pool of 2,000€. However, this initiative did not result in the creation of a CS:GO team.

The following year, in 2017, Sporting CP became one of 19 clubs to qualify for the first edition of the FIFA Interactive Club World Cup, played in London, but failed to reach the final stage. However, this participation was a milestone for the club, consolidating its entry into the competitive esports scene.

This was also the year where Sporting CP Esports won its first ever title. Gonçalo ‘Rastaartur’ Pinto won the first edition of the Allianz Challenge, organized by the eSports department of the Portuguese Football Federation. The tournament was held at Lisboa Games Week and played on the FIFA 18 video game.

The year 2017 is defined by the permanent entry of the Portuguese Football Federation into the world of esports. After creating several tournaments, it announced the creation of a new Pro Clubs League. In order to fully participate in the new national competition, Sporting CP Esports presented its Pro Clubs team on September 16, in partnership with the existing team LionHearts.

In 2019, the former football player and winner of the 2015 FIFA Puskás Award, Wendell Lira, signed for the club. He would leave the club in 2020, days before the release of FIFA 21.

In 2021, Epic Games created an initiative in Fortnite aimed at football fans. The Pelé Championship brought new skins and gestures to the game related to 23 different clubs. As one of the featured clubs, Sporting CP became the only Portuguese club to appear in Fortnite.

Seven years after the creation of Sporting CP Esports, a new sport was added to the club. On October 4, 2023, Sporting CP became the first multi-sports club to have a Rocket League team. The first Rocket League team was formed by Gonçalo Costa (Lazybear), Diogo Bento (Xyz45), Pedro Pinheiro (Fusion77) and André Reis (Arafar).

Besides the addition of a new esport, 2023 saw two structural changes at Sporting CP Esports. With the support of sponsor NOS, Sporting CP created the Camarote NOS eStadium within the Estádio de Alvalade, a high-tech facility that provides Sporting CP Esports its own training venue.

In January 2023, Sporting CP announced a partnership with Spanish team Dux Gaming, starting with the video game EA FC 24. This new partnership allowed DUX Gaming to also compete in Portugal and allowed the club to enter women's esports. In January 2024, Spanish EA FC player Olga García became the first female esports athlete at Sporting CP.

In 2025, a third esports team was added to the club. A partnership with the renowned Williams Sim Racing (Williams Racing's esports team) allows Sporting CP to compete in F1. Nélson ‘Nalves’ Alves and Luís Nogueira form the club's first virtual driver duo, who compete in the F1 Pro Series, part of Portugal's largest Formula 1 community, FlyingLapF1.

== Honours ==
=== FIFA ===
- Allianz Challenge: 1

2017 (Gonçalo “Rastaartur” Pinto)

- Taça de Portugal FPF eSports 1v1: 1

2018 (Gonçalo “Rastaartur” Pinto)

- Supertaça FPF eSports 1v1: 1

2018 (Gonçalo “Rastaartur” Pinto)

- eAllianz League Cup: 1

2020 (Bruno Rato + Duarte Ferro)

=== Rocket League ===
- Rocket Master League Portugal: 1 (Season 3)

2024 (Main Rosters: Ivo "rafa" Costa Pereira", Daniel "dani" Fernandes, Gonçalo "TK" Fernandes / Substitutes: Gonçalo "Lazybear" Costa, Diogo "mdz" Monteiro)

=== F1 ===
- FL Pro League: 1

2025 (Nélson "Nalves" Alves)

== Management ==
Nat.	Name	Position
(Portugal)	Márcio Figueiredo	Head of Esports
(Portugal)	André Perdiz	Manager Rocket League
(Portugal)	Carlos “naspacri” Dias	Manager EA FC
