= Supporters of Sporting CP =

Sporting Clube de Portugal (Sporting CP) is a Portuguese sports club based in Lisbon and founded in 1906. Sporting CP have won 21 championships, 18 Taça de Portugal, 4 Taça da Liga, 9 Supertaça Cândido de Oliveira, 4 Campeonato de Portugal and 1 UEFA Cup Winners' Cup in men's football, and through its athletics department was responsible, respectively, in 1984 and 1976, for Portugal's first Olympic gold and Olympic silver medals ever, as well as for other titles in other men's and women's sports, disciplines and competitions throughout its history. Being a multi-sports club, Sporting CP has described itself as Portugal's "biggest sporting powerhouse" (a maior potência desportiva nacional) due to the number of titles won by its teams and athletes in several sports and sport disciplines, including in the Olympic Games, where they do not represent the club.

The supporters of the club, who are called Sportinguistas, have played an important part in the club's growth during its 120-year existence. One of those cases was the raising of money for the construction of the club's first indoor arena in 1976 and the João Rocha Pavilion in 2016, when supporters donated money to pay the building works. The club has about 150,000 affiliated members (called sócios) and research studies have suggested it has a number of fans ranging from 1,100,000 to 2,700,000 in Portugal alone – which makes it the second or third most supported sports club in Portugal, depending on the study. Like the other two Portuguese Big Three sports clubs, Sporting CP has also a sizable number of foreign fans in other Portuguese-speaking countries beyond Portugal itself and supporters among the Portuguese expatriate community.

Since shortly after the foundation of the sports club in 1906, Sporting CP and its supporters have established official centres (núcleos), branches (filiais) or delegations (delegações) of the club across Portugal and abroad.

Organised autonomous groups of supporters (claques) also exist. Sporting has 4 ultras groups: Juventude Leonina, founded in 1976, Torcida Verde, founded in 1984, Directivo Ultras XXI, founded in 2002 and Brigada Ultras Sporting, founded in 2004.

== Centres, branches and delegations ==
Throughout its history the club and its supporters established centres, branches and delegations (núcleos, filiais e delegações) of Sporting CP across Portugal and abroad. Among them, branches such as Sporting Clube de Tomar (branch number 1), Sporting Clube Farense (branch number 2), Sporting Clube Olhanense (branch number 4), Sporting Clube da Covilhã (branch number 8) and Sporting Clube Campomaiorense (branch number 27), as well as delegations such as Lusitânia (delegation number 14), became noted autonomous sports clubs that reached the top level of Portuguese league systems in sports like football, rink hockey or basketball. Founded in 1920, Sporting Clube de Lourenço Marques (branch number 6 until 1975 and later renamed as CD Maxaquene) was also a branch of Sporting CP in Mozambique, East Africa, and under this original name, Mozambique-born Portuguese football player Eusébio graduated as a footballer and played for the Mozambican club at both youth level and the main squad between the ages of 12 and 18. The centres (núcleos) were created and institutionalised in Sporting Clube de Portugal's 10th Club Statutes of 1984 and are characterised as being a group of sportinguistas who get together and organise themselves to promote, support, celebrate and publicise Sporting CP. Many of them are also involved in important recreational, social and sporting activities. The branches (filiais), more than 100 were founded around the world since the early years of Sporting CP, are sports clubs that have associated themselves with Sporting CP's core values, are managed as autonomous sports clubs and contribute to the expansion of Sporting CP. The delegations (delegações) are sporting, recreational and cultural institutions that represent the interests of Sporting CP in the places where they are based and mobilise the ideals of the club in those same regions.

== Organised supporters' groups ==
Organised supporters' groups of Sporting at the old stadium
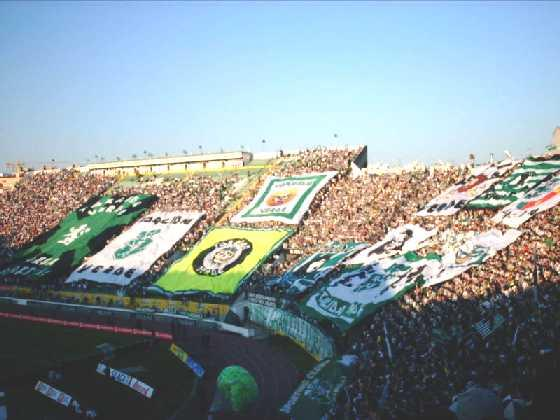

Sporting is the club with the oldest support group in Portugal, Juventude Leonina established in 1976, and is the club with most supporters groups. They support the club not only in football, but also in futsal, handball, basketball, roller hockey, volleyball and the rest of the sports practiced in Sporting. As of 2019, Sporting was the club with the most registered members in its four organised support groups (claques): Juventude Leonina (1,632), Diretivo Ultras XXI (709), Torcida Verde (358) and Brigadas Ultras (238). Unregistered members, including the so-called casuals, are known to exist in huge numbers.

The support groups used to be separated at Estádio José Alvalade but, since 2013, they are together at the so-called "curva sul" (south corner) of the stadium.

Since 2019, and after a number of alarming scandals and illicit situations involving supporters' groups and some of its most prominent members (a fact that was also true for supporters' groups of rival clubs), the board of Sporting CP headed by Frederico Varandas, in a statement expressing disapproval of negative behaviours in the club, established a number of rules regulating organised groups of supporters which would lead to the protocol of the 2022–03 season, designed to be renewed on a case-by-case and year-by-year basis:

"The protocol regulates the relationship between SCP, SCP SAD and the GOA [Organised Group of Supporters] during the 2022/2023 sporting season, establishing the terms and conditions for granting technical, financial and material support to said GOA. In accordance with what is stipulated in Law 39/2009, the protocol binds the GOA to remain in the Zones with Special Conditions of Access and Permanence of Supporters (ZCEAP)."

This yearly protocols are established in accordance with the new legal framework enacted in a draft law of 2022 submitted to the Portuguese Parliament with the aim of "strengthening mechanisms to combat violence in sport".

=== Juventude Leonina ===
Juventude Leonina
- Nickname: Juve Leo
- Established: 17 March 1976 (50 years ago)
- Type: Supporters' group
- Motto: Primeiros a nascer, últimos a morrer

Juventude Leonina is the first support group to be founded in Portugal. It was founded in 1976 by the sons of João Rocha (Gonçalo Rocha and João Rocha) together with Luís Figueiredo.

Juve Leo had more than 15,000 members in the 1980s and 1990s. After the "division" of associates, first with the departure of some elements which would found Torcida Verde and later the departure of more elements that formed the Directivo Ultras XXI, Juve Leo went through a dark moment in his history.

Juve Leo and Directivo have a friendship with the supporters of ACF Fiorentina.

In May 2018, 50 members of Juve Leo broke into Academia Sporting, among them, the former leader of Juve Leo, Fernando Mendes, and attacked some men's football team players and members of the staff, disappointed with the performance of the team. In October 2019, the club direction terminated the protocols it had with Juve Leo and Directivo, due to the scale of violence. Nuno Mendes (aka Mustafá) had become the new leader of Juve Leo before being convicted in 2019 and handing himself in to serve 6 years and 4 months in prison on 16 February 2024 due to a residential burglary case involving also Paulo Pereira Cristóvão, a former Polícia Judiciária (PJ) officer and former candidate for the presidency of the club in 2009 who had already been expelled from club membership in October 2017. Cristóvão was also involved in the disappearance of Joana Cipriano's case, in which he was accused - and acquitted - of the offence of torturing the child's mother. In the midst of the scandal caused by the suspicion that he and his colleagues had beaten a confession out of her, Pereira Cristóvão resigned from the PJ.

=== Torcida Verde ===
Torcida Verde
- Established: 11 November 1984 (41 years ago)
- Type: Supporters' group

Appeared in 1983, having at that time accepted an invitation from the Juventude Leonina to come together, due to the large number of support groups in the club. However, the experiment failed and the same would happen later when Torcida joined the Força Verde.

So, in 1984, Torcida Verde was founded. Without the club support, Torcida were always present and, inspired by the club values, supported the different teams of the club. By doing this, Sporting recognised Torcida as an official club support group in 1988.

Among the many things done by Torcida to help the club, these stand out:

- In 1991, painting of the José Alvalade Stadium in green and white, a voluntary work.
- In 1994, collaboration in the construction of the Sporting Museum.

=== Directivo Ultras XXI ===
Directivo Ultras XXI
- Nickname: DUXXI
- Established: 17 May 2002 (24 years ago)
- Type: Supporters' group
- Motto: Coerência, honra e fidelidade

Directivo was founded in 2002, by Vítor Santos, after the club won the championship.

DUXXI is an unofficial fan group of sporting with over a member making it second-largest fan group in sporting. The name "Directivo Ultras XXI" means "Direction" (Directivo), "Ultras" being a word to describe fanatical supportergroups and "XXI" is 21 in roman numerals which is to represent it being the 21st century from when they had been established.

Directivo and Juve Leo have a friendship with the supporters of ACF Fiorentina.

In October 2019, the club direction terminated the protocols it had with Juve Leo and Directivo, due to the scale of violence.

=== Brigada Ultras Sporting ===
Brigada Ultras Sporting
- Established: 12 September 2004 (22 years ago)
- Type: Supporters' group

Brigada appeared in 2004, being, at the time, fully constituted by old members of Torcida Verde, who affirmed themselves as "a group of friends with a passion for the ultra world and an eternal love for Sporting Clube de Portugal".

It is Sporting's support group with the least members, however, it continues to have many fans supporting the club around the world.

The inauguration of the new Brigada headquarters was in 2018 and was attended by well-known handball players.
