= Álvaro Sobrinho =

Portuguese-Angolan banker and businessman (born 1962)

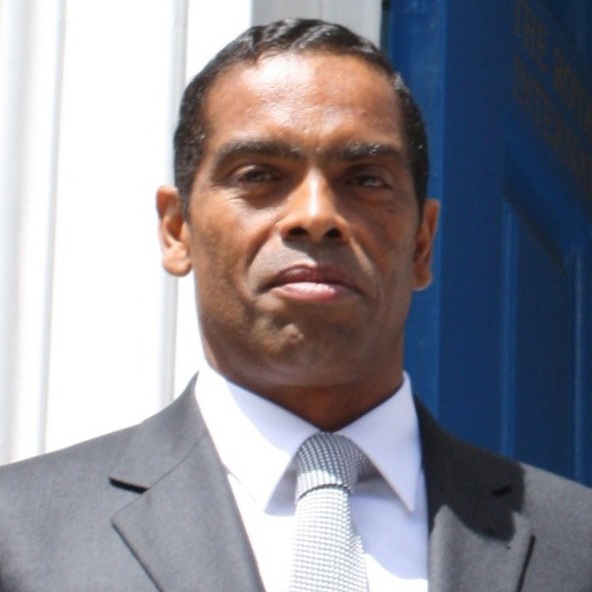
- Sobrinho in 2014
- Born: Álvaro de Oliveira Madaleno Sobrinho; 1962 (age 62–63); Luanda, Angola
- Occupation(s): Banker, businessman
- Known for: Founder of Planet Earth Institute
- Spouse: Anna Sobrinho
- Children: 2
- Website: alvaro-sobrinho.com

Álvaro de Oliveira Madaleno Sobrinho (born 1962) is a Portuguese-Angolan banker and businessman who built his career in Portugal. He was a director at the Portuguese bank Banco Espírito Santo, which went bankrupt in 2014. Sobrinho later led Banco Valor Angola, investing in several businesses in Africa, and invested in the sports club Sporting CP and in two Portuguese newspapers. He also founded the Planet Earth Institute Foundation in Mauritius in partnership with the President of Mauritius.

== Early life and education ==
Sobrinho was born in Angola and moved to Portugal to study mathematics and statistics at Universidade Nova de Lisboa. While in Portugal, he was mentored by Ricardo Salgado.

== Career ==
After a decade with Grupo Banco Espírito Santo, Sobrinho became a director of Banco Espírito Santo (BES) in Lisbon at age 38. He later contributed to establishing its Angolan subsidiary. In 2013, Sobrinho assumed the role of Executive chairman at Banco Valor Angola. He later stepped down from executive positions to focus on other business investments. Banco Valor is reportedly the 13th-largest bank in Angola.

In July 2014, the Portuguese weekly Expresso reported that Banco Espírito Santo (BESA) had extended loans totaling US$5.7 billion—approximately 80% of its debt portfolio—under Sobrinho's tenure as chief executive, a position he left in October 2012. In 2015, Sobrinho was cleared of allegations related to the collapse of the bank and has since sought compensation from the Expresso news outlet.

== Personal life ==
Sobrinho has investments in telecommunications with YooMee Africa and in the media industry with Newshold Group, as well as in publishing, manufacturing, retail, travel, and renewable energies. In 2015, he invested in exploration drilling projects in Ethiopia and Kenya.

Sobrinho owns Holdimo, a company that, as of August 2017, holds a significant private share in the Portuguese sports club Sporting CP. In a 2018 interview, Sobrinho stated that he and Holdimo intended to remove the then-president of Sporting, Bruno de Carvalho, from office, following the poor performance of the football team and unrest among supporters after an incident at the Academia Sporting training ground on 15 May 2018.

Sobrinho is the founding chairman of the Planet Earth Institute (PEI), based in London. The institute is accredited by the United Nations Environment Programme and its mission is described as promoting the "scientific independence of Africa".

In 2015, Sobrinho was appointed Business Champion for African Science by the World Bank.

Sobrinho has also donated to Africa-focused charities and programs, including the Duke of Edinburgh International Award and the GAVI Alliance.

Also in 2015, the Planet Earth Institute launched the Planet Earth Institute Foundation in Mauritius, with Dr Ameenah Gurib-Fakim, former President of Mauritius, serving as vice-chairman. The foundation awarded scholarships to researchers in Mauritius.

== Allegations/Controversies ==
=== Estoril Sol ===
Portuguese authorities investigated Sobrinho during his tenure as chairman of Banco Espírito Santo Angola (BESA) regarding his use of an overseas company to purchase six apartments in the Estoril Sol Residence complex in Lisbon, Portugal, with an initial payment of €9.5 million. During the investigation, the apartments were seized by court order but were later returned to Sobrinho due to a lack of evidence.

=== Monte Branco ===
Sobrinho was a shareholder of Swiss wealth management company Akoya Asset Management, which was mentioned in the Monte Branco investigation into tax evasion. Sobrinho ordered an investigation by Swiss authorities that cleared him and all non-executive shareholders of any wrongdoing.
