= Sousa Cintra =

Portuguese businessman (born 1944)

José de Sousa Cintra (born 1944), known professionally as Sousa Cintra, is a Portuguese businessman who served as president of multi-sports club Sporting CP from 1989 to 1995.

== Biography ==
He was born in 1944 in the village and parish of Raposeira, Vila do Bispo Municipality, in the Algarve region. He left school after concluding the 4th grade. As a child he worked as a snail trader in his village, and at 15 years old he went to Lisbon where he obtained a job at Hotel Tivoli Lisboa as an elevator operator. While working there, he earned a larger amount of money selling watercolor paintings on the side. At 16 years old he joined the Portuguese Navy and served for four years. In the following years, his real estate businesses would prosper. After the Carnation Revolution of 1974 and the Processo Revolucionário em Curso of 1975, Cintra saw a number of his assets expropriated but eventually would later acquire Águas Vidago, a mineral water company. Between 1989 and 1995, Sousa Cintra was the chairman of Sporting CP. During his tenure as president of Sporting CP, the sports club established, in 1991, its first ever women's football team. In the summer of 1993, Sousa Cintra, taking advantage of a deep crisis at Benfica, led at the time by Jorge de Brito, signed players Paulo Sousa and Pacheco, who had terminated their contracts due to unpaid wages, to Sporting. A fully-fledged sports club museum to inventory, interpret and display the large number of trophies stored at the sports club's facilities was also established during his tenure, in 1994.

In 1998, he bought a brewery in São Paulo and shortly after he built another in Rio de Janeiro, Brazil. His beer business in Brazil reached the break even point and was ranked number four in a short span of time. In 2001, he invested in a new beer factory in Santarém, Portugal in order to produce and sell Cintra beer in his home country. Due to the strong competition and the power of well-established beer brands in the Portuguese market (Super Bock and Sagres), Sousa Cintra sold his Portuguese beer business in 2006, retaining only the successful Brazilian activities until 2007, when they were sold to AmBev.

Sousa Cintra served as acting president of Sporting Clube de Portugal - Futebol, SAD during the mandate of an emergency management committee established after the ousting of Sporting CP's president Bruno de Carvalho from his post on 24 June 2018. After has been appointed acting president on 24 June, Cintra officially stepped down in September 2018 following the club's elections that elected Frederico Varandas as the new president of the multi-sports club.

== Personal life ==
José Sousa Cintra married a teacher from Lagos and, after his time in the navy, their son Miguel Sousa Cintra, his only child, was born. However, this first marriage was short-lived. Until 2003, Sousa Cintra had already married three times.
