= Frederico Varandas =

Portuguese sports executive and medical doctor (born 1979)

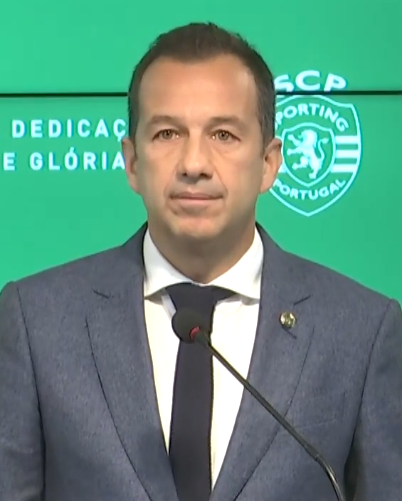
- Varandas in 2024

President of Sporting CP
- Incumbent
- Assumed office 9 September 2018
- Preceded by: Bruno de Carvalho

Personal details
- Born: Frederico Nuno Faro Varandas; 19 September 1979 (age 47) Lisbon, Portugal
- Occupation: Doctor

Military service
- Allegiance: Portugal
- Branch/service: Portuguese Army
- Years of service: 2005–present
- Rank: Captain
- Battles/wars: Afghanistan War
- Awards: Commemorative Campaigns Medal; D. Afonso I of Portugal Army Medal; NATO Medal

Frederico Nuno Faro Varandas (born 19 September 1979) is a Portuguese sports executive, medical doctor and former commissioned military captain of the Portuguese Army, who has been the president of Sporting CP since 2018. With a presidency initially marked by contestation, the Varandas tenure is since 2025 the most titled in the club's history, as well as characterized by a discreet presidential position, successful financial rehabilitation of the club, the renewal of the José Alvalade Stadium and the expansion of the club’s football academy. During the club's last election, in 2026, Varandas was elected with 89.47% of the votes.

== Early life and career ==
Son of a doctor father and a chemistry and physics teacher mother, and hailing from the affluent Avenida de Roma area in Lisbon, in his childhood, he practised gymnastics and swimming at Sporting Clube de Portugal. His paternal grandfather, who was already a long-standing affiliated member of Sporting Portugal, introduced him to sports fandom at the club. A Frederico Varandas's great-grandfather was João Luís de Moura, who served as president of the sports club "Os Belenenses" between 1925 and 1931. He was the father of a Frederico Varandas's maternal grandmother. His other grandfather, Manuel José de Castro Petrony de Abreu Faro, who died in 1999, was a professor and telecommunications researcher at the Instituto Superior Técnico.

Before adulthood, Varandas wanted to be an architect but found he lacked the necessary vocation or talent. He then tried to get admission into the medical school at the end of his secondary education studies but the very high grades needed to enter medical school didn’t allow him to achieve that goal. Following his mother’s advice, he then applied for military medicine and was selected. He studied medicine at the Medical School of the New University of Lisbon from where he graduated in medicine in 2005 as an external medical student since he was a pupil of the Portuguese Military Academy. He completed a postgraduate course in sports medicine in 2007. In 2008, as a lieutenant military doctor, he was deployed in Afghanistan with a detachment of Portuguese Commandos which was part of the International Security Assistance Force. Whilst carrying out his military duties in Afghanistan, his group of soldiers was ambushed in a clash which they all survived. This episode marked him deeply.

His career in football had begun in 2007, when he joined the medical staff at Vitória Setúbal; two years later he was promoted to clinical director of the same football team, a position he held until the summer of 2011, when he was invited to become head doctor of the senior men's football team at Sporting Portugal. Varandas was the chief doctor of Sporting Portugal's main men's professional football team until 2018. In 2016, after a period of specialised training in accordance with the Portuguese Order of Physicians' (Ordem dos Médicos) guidelines, he had become a medical specialist in the field of sports medicine. During the COVID-19 pandemic in Portugal and the ensuing state of emergency, Varandas, already the incumbent president of Sporting Portugal, was voluntarily commissioned by the Serviço Nacional de Saúde (Portugal's National Health Service) as a doctor.

=== President of Sporting CP ===
Sousa Cintra served as acting president of Sporting Clube de Portugal - Futebol, SAD during the mandate of an emergency management committee established after the ousting of Sporting CP's president Bruno de Carvalho from his post on 24 June 2018. After has been appointed acting president on 24 June, Cintra officially stepped down in September 2018 following the club's elections that elected Frederico Varandas as the new president of the multi-sports club.

While Varandas was working in the capacity of chairman (or president) of Sporting Clube de Portugal, and Francisco Salgado Zenha was both vice-chairman at the club as a whole and CFO at Sporting Portugal’s SAD for football, a financial restructuring was started by the sports club under his direction in 2019 and included the successful renegotiation of bank debt resorting to debt restructuring and debt relief, as well as the repurchasing of convertible debt belonging to Novo Banco and Banco Comercial Português at a discount to par value, which was finalized in 2024. This allowed Sporting Clube de Portugal to take ownership of 88 per cent of Sporting Clube de Portugal – Futebol, SAD's stock from 15 February 2024 onwards, instead of the 83.90% it owned until that time.

Since 2019, and after a number of alarming scandals and illicit situations involving supporters' groups and some of its most prominent members (a fact that was also true for supporters' groups of rival clubs), the board of Sporting CP headed by Frederico Varandas, in a statement expressing disapproval of negative behaviours in the club, established a number of rules regulating organised groups of supporters which would lead to the protocol of the 2022–23 season, designed to be renewed on a case-by-case and year-by-year basis: "The protocol regulates the relationship between SCP, SCP SAD and the GOA [Organised Group of Supporters] during the 2022/2023 sporting season, establishing the terms and conditions for granting technical, financial and material support to said GOA. In accordance with what is stipulated in Law 39/2009, the protocol binds the GOA to remain in the Zones with Special Conditions of Access and Permanence of Supporters (ZCEAP)." This yearly protocols were established in accordance with the new legal framework enacted in a draft law of 2022 submitted to the Portuguese Parliament with the aim of "strengthening mechanisms to combat violence in sport".

In men's football, on 11 May 2021, Sporting CP secured its 19th Primeira Liga title (23rd title when the old Campeonato de Portugal is taken into account) after a 1–0 home win against Boavista. It was Sporting CP's first title in the Primeira Liga since the 2001–02 season. It was also the first Primeira Liga title since that season not being won by either Benfica or Porto. In an editorial for the official Sporting newspaper at the end of the 2020–2021 sports season, he wrote: "This season we wrote another page of glory in the history of Sporting Clube de Portugal, full of eclecticism, materialised with achievements in all sports," "the long-awaited 23rd title of National Champions is ours. This season, from futsal to basketball, from hockey to athletics, from rugby to table tennis, judo and surfing, our athletes have once again outdone themselves, achieving the club's best season in 115 years."

Also in 2021, Sporting CP, headed by club president Frederico Varandas, announced that it would change the colour of the seats in the multicoloured stands of the Estádio José Alvalade to green (the main colour of the sports club). The colour change was completed in 2022. For the 2022–2026 quadrennium, Frederico Varandas' administration started works of building renovation and modernization of the club's facilities at the José Alvalade Stadium and the Cristiano Ronaldo Academy. These included the removal of green and yellow tiles in order to make the stadium an all green and white building, renovation of the presidential stand and the professional team changing rooms, installation of Wi-Fi and technological modernisation of the turnstile ticketing system at the stadium. The facility for Sporting CP Esports team at the club’s stadium was also modernised with the help of the club’s sponsor NOS and was upgraded with state-of-the-art HP Omen and PlayStation 5 machines, among other improvements for both players and visitors.

In 2022, the club's board, led by Frederico Varandas, announced a project to expand and modernize the club's football academy located in Alcochete. The project, which included extending the facility's boundaries by six hectares, increasing the total from 22 to 28, planned for the construction of a stadium similar to the Aurélio Pereira Stadium, the main stadium at the academy, also with a capacity for about one thousand spectators. It also included five new pitches with supporting stands and changing room blocks, the unification of the two youth training gyms to expand the space, a reception building, and a park of photovoltaic panels.

In February 2024, the board of directors of Sporting CP headed by Varandas renewed the protocol with the University of Lisbon, thus continuing the link that had been in place since 2007, and announced an investment of three million euros in the modernisation of the EUL Pole in Lisbon, the home of the club's academy for under-13 football players, athletics and other sports. The improvements included the construction of new football pitches, the remodelling of the synthetic turf, the construction of new stands and nine changing rooms, as well as the use of the EUL swimming pool at specific times for Sporting CP's swimming teams and the remodelling and expansion of the administrative building, thus, in addition to men's and women's football, Sporting CP's swimming and rugby departments would also benefit from the works.

In May 2024, at the reception for the squad at the Lisbon City Hall chaired by Carlos Moedas, after achieving the Primeira Liga title for a second time under his leadership as chairman of Sporting CP, he declared: "It's a paradigm shift, the end of an era in which Sporting won sporadically and at intervals of decades. It's confirmation of a new era where Sporting no longer looks up to see its rivals and is once again prepared to win."

In July 2025, Frederico Varandas received a concrete offer to join one of the biggest clubs of the Saudi Pro League, one that belongs to the country's Sovereign Wealth Fund (PIF), to take on the role of CEO. Varandas ultimately rejected the offer, opting to stay at Sporting Portugal and continue the work he had begun exactly seven years before, when he was first elected as president of the green and white club. The offer from the Saudis included a seven-figure salary, which was several times higher than the compensation for the Sporting Clube de Portugal - Futebol, SAD board. At the previously held meeting of the club’s General Assembly, the board had approved a proposal from the Shareholders' Committee for a fixed annual salary of 300,000 euros plus a 300,000 euro bonus for the head of the organization. Despite the consideration of the offer received—which was justified by the club's on-field success, with three Primeira Liga titles in the last five years, and positive financial results that allowed for more investment in infrastructure like the stadium and academy—the conversations went no further.

== Personal life ==
Frederico Varandas is married to Katarina Larsson, a Sweden-born Swedish-Portuguese former triathlete who competed for both Sporting Clube de Portugal at club level and Portugal in the triathlon, and with whom he has two children born in 2019 and 2023. They first met each other at the sports club located in the Alvalade – Lumiar area of Lisbon. They started dating in 2018. Larsson has worked as supply chain manager for the Tetra Pak factory in Carnaxide, in the municipality of Oeiras.

== Football Honours ==
=== Domestic Competitions ===
- Primeira Liga: 3

2020–21, 2023–24, 2024–25

- Taça de Portugal: 2

2018–19, 2024–25

- Taça da Liga: 3

2018–19, 2020–21, 2021–22

- Supertaça Cândido de Oliveira: 1

2021

== Futsal Honours ==
=== International ===
- Intercontinental Futsal Cup: 1

2026

- UEFA Futsal Champions League: 3

Champions: 2018–19, 2020–21, 2025-26

=== National Competitions ===
- Portuguese League: 4

2020–21, 2021–22, 2022–23, 2023–24

- Portuguese Cup: 4

2018–19, 2019–20, 2021–22, 2024–25

- Portuguese League Cup: 4

2020–21, 2021–22, 2023–24, 2024–25

- Portuguese Supercup: 5

2019, 2021, 2022, 2025, 2026

== Roller Hockey Honours ==
=== World Competitions ===
- Rink hockey World Club Championship

Winners (1): 2025

=== International ===
- WSE Champions League: 3

2018–19, 2020–21, 2023–24

- WSE Continental Cup: 2

2019, 2021

=== National Competitions ===
- Portuguese First Division: 1

2020–21

- Portuguese Cup: 2

2024–25, 2025-26

- Portuguese Super Cup: 1

2025

== Handball Honours ==
=== National Competitions ===
- Portuguese League: 3

2023–24, 2024–25, 2025-26

- Portuguese Cup : 5

2021–22, 2022–23, 2023–24, 2024–25, 2025-26

- Portuguese Super Cup: 4

2023, 2024, 2025, 2026

== Volleyball Honours ==
=== National Competitions ===
- Portuguese Championship: 2

2024–25, 2025-26

- Portuguese Cup: 3

2020–21, 2023–24, 2025-26

- Portuguese Super Cup: 3

2024, 2025, 2026

- Portuguese Federation Cup: 1

2022-2023

=== Continental Competitions ===
- Taça Ibérica: 2

2024, 2026

== Basketball Honours ==
=== National Competitions ===
- LPB: 1

2020/2021

- Portuguese Basketball Cup: 4

2019/2020, 2020/2021, 2021/2022, 2025/2026

- Portuguese Basketball Super Cup: 2

2021, 2022

- Taça Hugo dos Santos: 3

2021/2022, 2022/2023, 2025/2026

Preceded by Bruno de Carvalho	President of Sporting CP; 2018-	Succeeded by -
