= Wendell Lira =

Brazilian footballer

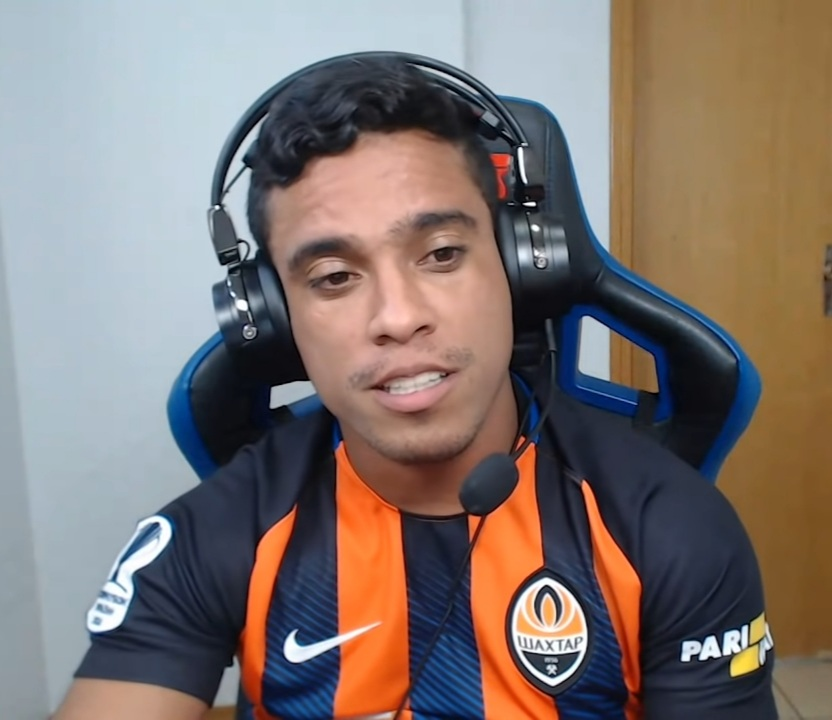
- Lira in 2021

Personal information
- Name: Wendell Silva Lira

Current team
- Team: Netshoes E-Sports
- Role: Player
- Game: FIFA

Career information
- Playing career: 2012–present

Team history
- 2019–2020: Sporting CP
- 2020–present: Netshoes E-Sports
Association football career
- Full name: Wendell Silva Lira
- Date of birth: 7 January 1989 (age 37)
- Place of birth: Goiânia, Brazil
- Height: 1.74 m (5 ft 9 in)
- Position: Forward
Youth career
- 2006–2009: Goiás
Senior career*
Years	Team	Apps	(Gls)
2006–2012	Goiás	38	(4)
2010	→ Fortaleza (loan)	1	(0)
2012–2013	Atlético Sorocaba	0	(0)
2012	Trindade	3	(0)
2013	Goianésia	16	(0)
2013	Novo Horizonte	8	(4)
2014	URT	3	(0)
2014	Anapolina	5	(0)
2015	Goianésia	15	(4)
2015	Tombense	2	(0)
2016	Vila Nova	6	(0)
Total		97	(12)
International career
2006	Brazil U20		
- * Club domestic league appearances and goals

Wendell Silva Lira (born 7 January 1989) is a Brazilian former footballer who played as a striker and current FIFA esports player.

== Club career ==
Wendell started his career at Goiás and was the Campeonato Brasileiro Sub-20 top scorer in 2006, being promoted to the senior squad in the following year. He made his professional debut in a 0–2 away defeat to São Paulo in the Campeonato Brasileiro on May 12, 2007, coming on as a 63rd-minute substitute for Fabrício Carvalho.

In June 2010, he was loaned to Fortaleza of the Campeonato Brasileiro Série C.

On 6 November 2015, it was announced that his goal for Goianésia in a 2–1 win over Atlético-GO was named to the ten-goal shortlist for the FIFA Puskás Award; the goal was later also selected as one of three final contenders for the 2015 FIFA Puskás Award. A free agent at the time of the announcement, he was signed by Vila Nova weeks after. His goal subsequently went on to win the award on 11 January 2016. Wendell received 46.7% of the total votes, ahead of Lionel Messi.

Wendell played for Vila Nova early in the 2016 season, but he was released on 3 May, having failed to score goals for his club.

== International career ==
Wendell Lira played for the Brazil national under-20 football team in a friendly tournament in Japan in 2006, scoring once. He received an offer by AC Milan, which was rejected by Goiás due to his five-year contract.

== Retirement ==
On 28 July 2016, Wendell announced his retirement from professional football due to persistent injuries, seeking a career as a professional FIFA player and also as a YouTuber.

== Career statistics ==
=== Club ===
Appearances and goals by club, season and competition
Club	Season	League			State league (Note: Includes Campeonato Goiano.)		National cup (Note: Includes Copa do Brasil.)		Continental		Other		Total	
Club	Season	Division	Apps	Goals	Apps	Goals	Apps	Goals	Apps	Goals	Apps	Goals	Apps	Goals
Goiás	2006	Série A	0	0	1	0	0	0	—		—		1	0
Goiás	2007	Série A	12	2	7	2	1	1	1 (Note: Appearance(s) in Copa Sudamericana)	0	—		21	5
Goiás	2008	Série A	0	0	0	0	0	0	—		—		0	0
Goiás	2009	Série A	0	0	0	0	0	0	—		—		0	0
Goiás	2010	Série A	7	0	11	0	4	0	—		—		22	0
Goiás	2011	Série B	0	0	0	0	0	0	—		—		0	0
Goiás	Total		19	2	19	2	5	1	1	0	—		44	5
Fortaleza (loan)	2010	Série C	1	0	—		—		—		3 (Note: One appearance in Copa do Nordeste, two appearances in Copa Fares Lopes)	0	4	0
Atlético Sorocaba	2012	Paulista A2	—		0	0	—		—		—		0	0
Trindade	2012	Goiano 2ª Divisão	—		3	0	—		—		—		3	0
Goianésia	2013	Série D	5	0	11	0	—		—		—		16	0
Novo Horizonte	2013	Goiano 3ª Divisão	—		8	4	—		—		—		8	4
URT	2014	Mineiro	—		3	0	—		—		—		3	0
Anapolina	2014	Série D	5	0	—		—		—		—		5	0
Goianésia	2015	Série D	0	0	15	4	—		—		—		15	4
Tombense	2015	Série C	2	0	—		—		—		—		2	0
Vila Nova	2016	Série B	0	0	6	0	—		—		3 (Note: Appearance(s) in Copa Verde)	0	9	0
Career total			32	2	65	10	5	1	1	0	6	0	109	13

== eSports ==
In 2012, Wendell was the Goiás FIFA tournament champion and in November 2015, he was the game's top Brazilian player, which almost qualified him to the 2016 FIFA Interactive World Cup. After winning the 2015 FIFA Puskás Award, he was challenged by 2015 FIWC champion Abdul Aziz Al-Shehri and defeated the Saudi Arabian 6–1, leading to an invite by EA Sports to compete in the 2016 FIWC. In 2019, Wendell joined Sporting CP eSports. In 2021, Wendell was called up to the Brazil national team and will play in the FIFAe Nations Series 2022 South American play-ins.

== Honours ==
Goiás

- Campeonato Goiano: 2009

Individual

- FIFA Puskás Award: 2015
