= João Rocha =

Portuguese sports manager and entrepreneur

President of Sporting CP
- In office 7 September 1973 – 3 October 1986
- Preceded by: Manuel Henrique Nazareth
- Succeeded by: Amado de Freitas

Personal details
- Born: João António dos Anjos Rocha; 9 July 1930 Setúbal, Portugal
- Died: 8 March 2013 (aged 82) Lisbon, Portugal
- Spouse: Maria Teresa Ribeiro Pereira Bastos dos Anjos Rocha
- Profession: Banker

João António dos Anjos Rocha (9 July 1930 – 8 March 2013) was a Portuguese entrepreneur, investor and sports manager. He was president of Sporting Clube de Portugal (Sporting CP) between 7 September 1973 and 3 October 1986.

== Presidency of Sporting CP ==
During his presidency of Sporting CP, numerous business projects were realized in the sports club, including the first project of club-company in Portugal, approved by the sports club's partners or members (sócios) in November 1973, denominated "Society of Constructions and Planning" (SCP, Sociedade de Construções e Planeamento). The Portuguese government authorised the establishment of the company and the issue of 2.5 million shares, with a nominal value of 100 escudos each. His intention of organizing and running the Portuguese club as a company was a visionary and ingenious solution in sports club management at the time since the special type of public limited company known as Sociedade Anónima Desportiva ("Public limited sports company") wasn't already available in Portugal. The sports club company project was hampered shortly after due to the events of the Carnation Revolution of 1974 and the labour movement-inspired, anti-market Processo Revolucionário em Curso of 1975. In any case, he managed to increase the number of Sporting CP's paying affiliated members (the sócios) almost sevenfold, from 20,000 to 136,000, opened the official Sporting CP store (Loja Verde), created the first department that resembled what would be later known as the commercial and marketing area of the sports club and with the financial help of the affiliated members raised money for the construction of the club's first indoor arena in 1976. At the same time, under his leadership, Sporting CP became the first Portuguese sports club to visit communist Angola and China after the 25 April Revolution (the Carnation Revolution of 1974). In 1983, the José de Alvalade Stadium (which had been inaugurated in 1956) was temporarily closed due to the building of the so-called New Stand. The stadium's capacity increased from 60,000 to 75,000 seats, which were later reduced again due to the introduction of chairs. João Rocha visited Ronald Reagan at the White House in 1986, when he accompanied Olympic champion Carlos Lopes, an athlete of Sporting CP, at the invitation of the then President of the United States. Between 1973 and 1986, the year he left the presidency, Sporting CP won more than 1,200 national and international titles (excluding regional and district titles or trophies) reaching a total of about 15,000 registered athletes per season. In addition, the number of sports departments and sporting disciplines practiced at the multi-sports club was increased during this period of time.

== Honors and recognition ==
The main indoor sports arena (pavilion) of Sporting CP, inaugurated in 2017, is named Pavilhão João Rocha in order to honor the former president.
