= Newshold =

Newshold SGPS is a Luso-Angolan media group, owned by Pineview Overseas, a Panama-based company, whose shareholders are powerful Angolan figures including tycoon Alvaro Sobrinho, who represents the Madalena family in this group. The company headquarters is in Lisbon. It has a share of 15.08% in Cofina, which owns the daily sales leader, the Correio da Manhã, the largest-circulation Lisbon based tabloid. Newshold controls 97% of Sol, Portugal's third largest weekly newspaper, fully owns daily newspaper i and owns minor stakes in two leading magazines, Visão and Expresso.
