= Pavilhão João Rocha =

Sports pavilion in Lisbon, Portugal

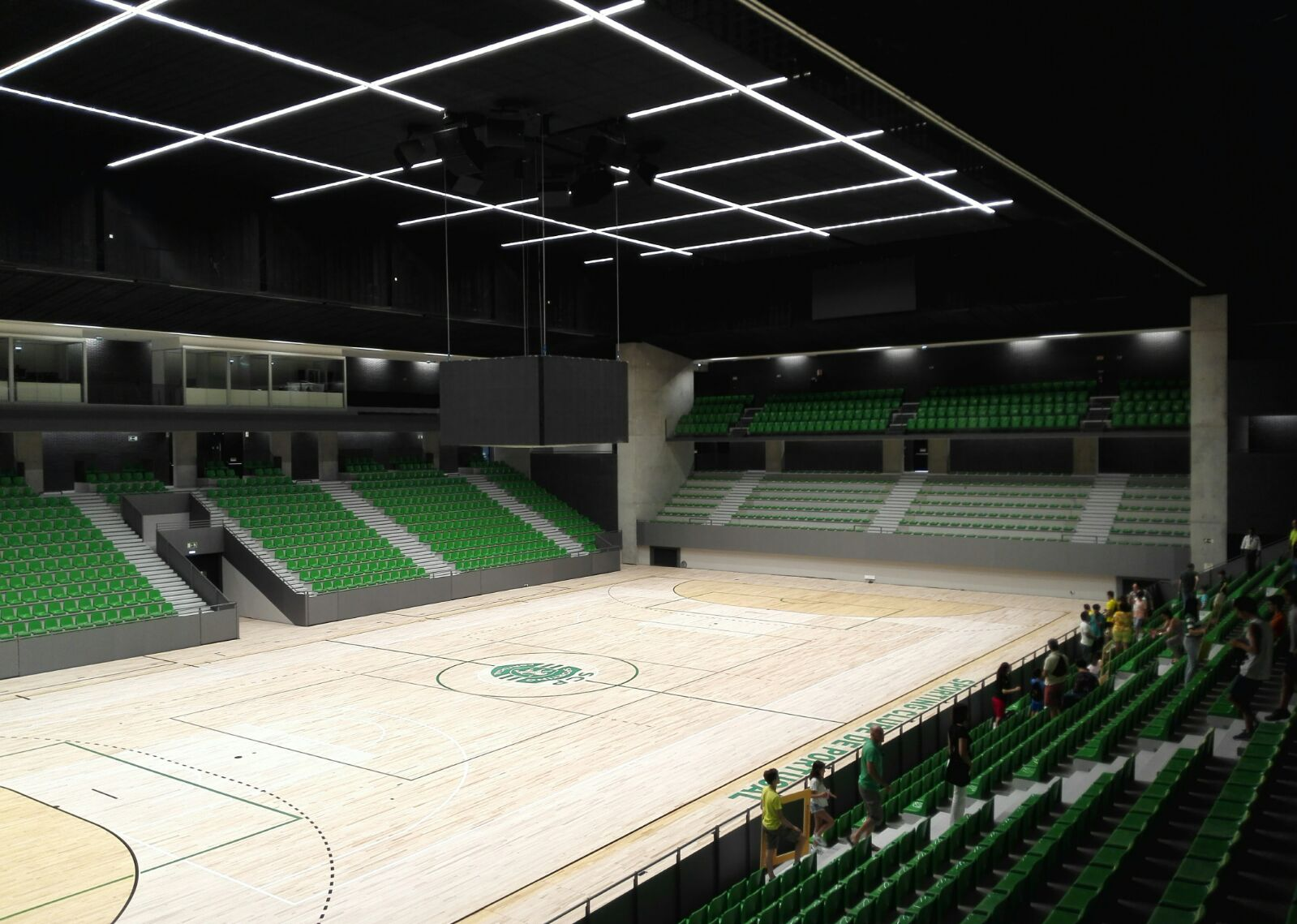
- Interactive map of Pavilhão João Rocha
- Location: Lisbon, Portugal
- Owner: Sporting CP
- Capacity: 3,001

Construction
- Opened: 21 Jun 2017
- Cost: € 9.621.557
- Architect: Andreas Mörschel

Tenants
- Sporting CP (futsal) (2017–present); Sporting CP (handball) (2017–present); Sporting CP (roller hockey) (2017–present); Sporting CP (volleyball) (2017–present); Sporting CP (basketball) (2019–present)

Website
- sporting.pt

Pavilhão João Rocha is a multi-sports arena located in Lisbon, Portugal, belonging to Sporting CP. The 3,001 seating capacity arena is home to basketball, futsal, handball, roller hockey and volleyball divisions of Sporting CP.

== History ==
The construction of the new Estádio José Alvalade required the demolition of Nave de Alvalade, the indoor sports arena of Sporting CP, which closed permanently in January 2004. After the demolition of Nave de Alvalade, Sporting CP no longer had its own venue for its indoor teams to compete, which forced the club to disperse its indoor sports throughout the Lisbon metropolitan area.

The necessity for a dedicated sports arena that would bring all indoor sports together became increasingly evident with each new season, but the grounds where the old Estádio José Alvalade stood, where the club intended to build the arena, were retained by Lisbon Municipal Chamber for a real estate project.

The entire process of handing over the ground to the club for the construction of the arena was only settled in 2013, when the Lisbon Municipal Assembly rectified the initial project to include the arena in it, approving the Alvalade XXI Detail Plan.

=== Name Selection ===
During the farewell ceremony for the Sporting CP athletes who were going to compete in the 2012 Summer Olympics, held on July 9, 2012, the then president of the club, Luís Godinho Lopes, announced that he would propose to the club members that the future arena be named after João Rocha. The announcement was made on the same day that the club's former president, João Rocha, celebrated his 82nd birthday.

João Rocha was president of Sporting CP for 13 years and stood out as an outstanding figure behind the club's sports development programs. During his mandate, the club reached the milestone of 15,000 athletes in 22 sports, won 12 European titles and the first Olympic medals in its history.

On September 30, 2012, the club's General Assembly unanimously approved the second item on the agenda, thereby approving the naming of the new arena after João Rocha.

=== Missão Pavilhão ===
After becoming club president in the 2013 elections, Bruno de Carvalho launched, after the approval by the Lisbon Municipal Assembly of the Alvalade XXI Detail Plan, the Missão Pavilhão, in order to raise financial resources for the construction of the Pavilhão João Rocha.

The objective of the Missão Pavilhão was the raising of ten million euros, to be divided by the construction of the Pavilhão João Rocha and the restoration of the Multidesportivo Sporting.

=== Opening ===
Pavilhão João Rocha was inaugurated on June 21, 2017, precisely 15 years after the inauguration of the Academia Cristiano Ronaldo in Alcochete, in a institutional ceremony. On the same day, in the areas surrounding the arena and the stadium, were inaugurated the Visconde de Alvalade roundabout, the Professor Mário Moniz Pereira street, and the Cristiano Ronaldo, Luís Figo, and Fernando Peyroteo football fields.

The first game held at Pavilhão João Rocha was on September 6, 2017. It was the first round of the Andebol 1, where Sporting CP defeated AC Fafe for 30-17, with 2,852 spectators.

In its first full competitive season (2017/2018), all Sporting CP teams that competed at Pavilhão João Rocha won the national championship (handball, futsal, roller hockey & volleyball)

=== Main Events ===
Five editions of the UEFA Futsal Champions League Elite Round were held at Pavilhão João Rocha (2017/2018, 2018/2019, 2021/2022, 2023/2024, 2024/2025). In all of them, Sporting CP qualified for the Final Four of the competition. The 2017/2018 Elite Round was characterized by the first match between Portuguese clubs in this competition. In this match, Sporting CP and SL Benfica drew 1-1.

The final four tournament of the 2018/2019 Rink Hockey Euroleague was held at Pavilhão João Rocha. After defeating SL Benfica for 5-4 at the semi-final, Sporting CP beat FC Porto by 5–2 at the final, to win their second trophy in the competition.

The 2019 Rink Hockey Continental Cup was held at Pavilhão João Rocha. Sporting CP won its first ever title after defeating FC Porto by 3-2.

In 2018, the Pavilhão João Rocha hosted the fourth and final phase of the 2017/2018 Super European Goalball League (SEGL). Sporting CP won the competition, securing its first international Paralympic title.

== Construction ==
The beginning of construction of Pavilhão João Rocha was marked on March 27, 2015. After an open training session held at the Estádio José Alvalade, the ceremony to mark the laying of the first stone of the arena took place, chaired by the then club president Bruno de Carvalho and the then mayor of Lisbon, Fernando Medina.

The construction process took approximately 22 months, including the standard period for inspections, connections, and usage permits, ending with the inauguration.

One year after the construction started, the club held an open day so that everyone could see the new sports venue. Approximately 1,300 supporters participated in the initiative.

After 689 days of construction, the Pavilhão João Rocha was ready to be inaugurated, becoming the new home of the indoor sports teams of Sporting CP.
