= Bruno de Carvalho =

Portuguese sports commentator and DJ

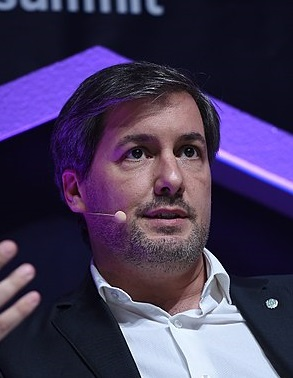
- Carvalho in 2017

42nd President of Sporting CP
- In office 23 March 2013 – 23 June 2018
- Preceded by: Luís Godinho Lopes
- Succeeded by: Frederico Varandas

Personal details
- Born: Bruno Miguel de Azevedo Gaspar de Carvalho; 8 February 1972 (age 54) Lourenço Marques, Mozambique

Bruno Miguel de Azevedo Gaspar de Carvalho (born 8 February 1972) is a Portuguese businessman, sports commentator and DJ who was the 42nd president of sports club Sporting CP from 2013 to 2018. He became the first Sporting president to be dismissed by associates of the club, fifteen months after being re-elected with 87% of votes.

== Early life ==
Carvalho was born in 1972 in the city of Lourenço Marques (now Maputo), which was by then the main administrative centre of the Portuguese overseas territory of Mozambique. In 1975, the year when the Portugal-ruled territory became independent from Portugal as the People's Republic of Mozambique, he left Mozambique to live in Portugal and, at the age of almost four, settled with his family in Lisbon. He studied at the Marquesa de Alorna preparatory school and went to Maria Amália Vaz de Carvalho secondary school. His mother was an employee of Pinto Balsemão's office in the Portuguese Parliament. His great uncle was the admiral and eventual Prime Minister of Portugal, José Baptista Pinheiro de Azevedo, who was a brother of his grandfather, Eduardo de Azevedo, a writer. He was a boy scout from the age of 10 to 14, a rugby player from 14 to 16 and a regional wrestling champion a year later. In 1985, Carvalho joined Juventude Leonina. When he was 20 years old, he set up camp in front of Gate 10 A of the José de Alvalade Stadium, demanding a tribute from the club to his grandfather, the writer Eduardo de Azevedo, author of A História e Vida do Sporting Clube de Portugal. Impressed by his determination, Sporting CP's president Sousa Cintra agreed to receive Carvalho and pay his respects to Carvalho's grandfather. He was awarded a degree in management (Instituto Superior de Gestão) and a master's degree in sports management from the Faculdade de Motricidade Humana and the Instituto Superior de Economia e Gestão. In 2000, he attended a UEFA coaching course. Bruno Carvalho set up his own company in the construction and refurbishment sector. He sold it in 2009 to found, in the same field, the company Soluções Atelier. In March 2009, Carvalho founded and presided Fundação de Solidariedade Social Aragão Pinto, a foundation dedicated to support the social integration of at-risk youth through sports. In the first year of activity, the foundation helped over 1200 children through partnerships with local sporting clubs and associations representing 15 different sporting activities. From 2009 to 2011, he was vice-president of Sporting CP's roller hockey department. On 27 March 2011, Carvalho was a candidate to the presidency of Sporting but eventually lost the elections to Godinho Lopes. During the election night, Carvalho, despite winning the popular vote with over 1500 more voters, lost by a mere 360 votes. Due to this, Godinho Lopes, as president-elect, was not able to speak to the crowd of associates waiting for the results, and it was Carvalho who managed to calm the crowd down. The election results were contested by Carvalho with allegations of irregularities as well as requests for a recount having been rejected by the General Assembly President of the club at the time, Lino de Castro.

== President of Sporting CP ==
On 24 March 2013, again a candidate, Carvalho won the club elections and became the 42nd president of Sporting. Four years later, on 4 March 2017, he was re-elected with 86.13% of the votes, defeating Pedro Madeira Rodrigues, who got 9.49%, in a total of 18,755 voters, a record in the club's history. He had been compared to Donald Trump by Jack Pitt-Brooke of The Independent newspaper three days before.

Carvalho's presidency had a number of successes, which consolidated his popularity, leading to his re-election in 2017. Financially, Carvalho recovered the near-bankruptcy club by negotiating a debt restructuring plan with a banking institution within the first month. Further, Carvalho, during the next few years, reduced liabilities and consolidated payroll costs, sustaining the growth. Simultaneously, negotiated a substantial 515 million euro TV rights contract with NOS and first reached positive shareholder's equity in the 2014/2015 exercise, the second exercise of his mandate.

Carvalho was also noteworthy for his calls to action on issues pertaining to the business of football, namely the implementation of VAR, making TPO illegal,, making referees' performance review public or making referees adequately paid. These and other subjects were a matter of discussion in several international conferences called "The Future of Football" organized yearly during Carvalho's presidency.

Carvalho while in Sporting inaugurated Sporting TV and Pavilhão João Rocha, which were both long-standing projects of the club wished by Sporting's associates. This, along with a resurgence in the competitiveness of the club's sports departments, made the number of Sporting associates increasing two fold during his time as president, reaching 160 thousand and becoming the third club in the world in that metric, behind Bayern Munich and rivals Benfica.

=== Destitution and aftermath ===
As a result of several incidents throughout his mandates as well as negative results in football at the end of the 2017–18 season, including the unilateral termination of contract by nine footballers after a violent invasion of the Academia de Alcochete by a mob of Sporting ultra supporters, Carvalho was dismissed as president after 71.36% of club members voted him out in a general assembly held at Altice Arena on 23 June 2018. On 24 June 2018, Sousa Cintra replaced him as acting president of Sporting Clube de Portugal – Futebol, SAD. On the same day, Carvalho posted a message on his Facebook page saying that he was no longer both a member and a supporter of Sporting CP. Nevertheless, in less than 14 hours, he withdrew the statement.

On 11 November 2018, Carvalho was detained at home for suspicion of giving permission to the violent attack by a mob of protesting Sporting supporters on players and manager of the men's main football team at the club's training facilities in Alcochete, on 15 May 2018. On 15 November, the Portuguese Public Ministry charged Carvalho with terrorism and 98 other crimes, which include aggravated threat (40), kidnapping (38), qualified offence to physical integrity (19), and possession of prohibited weapon. On 6 July 2019, Carvalho was expelled as member (sócio) of Sporting. Sporting CP's Fiscal and Disciplinary Board decided to expel former president Bruno de Carvalho as a member of the club due to accusations of attempted blocking of accounts and usurpation of functions, among other offences, in a total of twelve offences pointed out by the club.

On 11 March 2020, the state prosecutor in Carvalho's trial recognised that there was no evidence corroborating the accusation of Carvalho in the Alcochete attack case, leading to a recommendation to be deemed not guilty by the judge. In May 2020, Carvalho declared that he wanted to return to Sporting as a member with full powers. In his first interview after being acquitted in the Alcochete attack case trial, the former president said on TVI that he would like the members of Sporting CP to organise a General Assembly to discuss his return to the club as a member. In January 2021, Carvalho sued Cofina for alleged defamatory publications related to the attack at the Sporting training academy in Alcochete and to the Cashball case, an alleged sports corruption case in handball and football involving people linked to Sporting CP (businessmen João Gonçalves and Paulo Silva, and former Sporting CP employee Gonçalo Rodrigues, accused of 14 crimes) who would be ultimately declared innocent by a court of justice in 2023.

== Personal life ==
In 2022, Carvalho was a contestant on Big Brother - Famosos. In the reality television show, he expressed deep shock and terror while he talked about a female neighbor and alleged victim of Henrique Sotero, the Telheiras Rapist, when Carvalho resided in the Lisbon area of Telheiras. In September, he married Liliana Almeida, a fellow contestant he had met in the reality show and former member of the girls band Nonstop. This was his fourth marriage. In June 2024, they announced their divorce.

Preceded by Luís Godinho Lopes	President of Sporting CP; 2013–2018	Succeeded by Frederico Varandas
