= Sporting CP =

Association football club in Lisbon, Portugal

- Full name: Sporting Clube de Portugal (Note: Founded as Sporting Club de Portugal.)
- Nicknames: Leões (Lions); Verde e Brancos (Green-and-Whites); Sportinguistas (supporters)
- Short name: SCP
- Founded: 1 July 1906; 120 years ago (Note: Until 1919, the club's original foundation date was 8 May 1906. In 1920, they changed it to coincide with the date of their name change.)
- Stadium: Estádio José Alvalade
- Capacity: 52,095
- President: Frederico Varandas
- Head coach: Paulo Fonseca
- League: Primeira Liga
- 2025–26: Primeira Liga, 2nd of 18
- Website: sporting.pt
Home colours	Away colours	Third colours

Sporting Clube de Portugal (Portuguese pronunciation: [sɨˈpɔɾtĩg ˈkluβɨ ðɨ puɾtuˈɣal]), otherwise referred to as Sporting CP or Sporting, or known as Sporting Lisbon in other countries, is a Portuguese sports club based in Lisbon. Having various sports departments and sporting disciplines, it is best known for its men's professional football team playing in the Primeira Liga, the top flight of Portuguese football.

Founded on 1 July 1906, Sporting is one of the "Big Three" clubs in Portugal that have never been relegated from Primeira Liga, along with rivals Benfica and Porto. Sporting are nicknamed Leões (Lions), for the symbol used in the middle of the club's crest, and Verde e Brancos (Green and Whites), for the shirt colour that are in (horizontal) stripes. The club's anthem is called "A Marcha do Sporting" ("Sporting's March"), its motto is Esforço, Dedicação, Devoção e Glória (Effort, Dedication, Devotion and Glory), its supporters are called sportinguistas and the club's mascot is called Jubas. Sporting is the second largest sports club by membership in Portugal, with 200,000 members, which makes it one of the world's largest. It is also among the top three Portuguese sports clubs in number of non-affiliated fans. Their home ground has been the Estádio José Alvalade, built in 2003, which replaced the previous one, built in 1956. The club's indoor arena is the Pavilhão João Rocha multi-sports pavilion. Its youth academy has helped produce footballers such as Luís Figo and Cristiano Ronaldo.

With 58 official major trophies won, Sporting is the third most decorated club in Portuguese football, trailing significantly behind its two biggest rivals, FC Porto and SL Benfica. Domestically, they have won 21 League titles, 18 Taças de Portugal, a joint-record of 4 Campeonato de Portugal, 4 Taças da Liga and 9 Supertaças Cândido de Oliveira. In Europe, they won the 1963–64 European Cup Winners' Cup and were runners-up at the UEFA Cup in 2005 and at the Latin Cup in 1949. Sporting played in the first European Champions Cup match on 4 September 1955, by invitation, and has participated in the most editions of UEFA Cup/UEFA Europa League (36), a tournament in which they have the most matches played and the second most matches won, and where they are ranked first in the all-time club ranking.

== History ==
=== Foundation (1902–1906) ===
Evolution of Sporting Clube de Portugal's league performances since 1938

Sporting Clube de Portugal has its origins in June 1902, when a group of young men including Francisco da Ponte e Horta Gavazzo and his brother José Maria decided to create Sport Club de Belas. This club, the first ancestor of Sporting, played just one match and at the end of the year's summer, disbanded. Two years later, the idea of creating a football club was revived, and this time, with the Gavazzo brothers joined by José Alvalade (José Holtreman Roquette) and José Stromp; a new club, the Campo Grande Football Club, was founded. They played their matches on the estate of the Viscount of Alvalade (Alfredo Holtreman), José Alvalade's grandfather, with the club's headquarters located in Francisco Gavazzo's home. For two years, the club developed an intense activity on several sports, namely football, tennis and fencing.

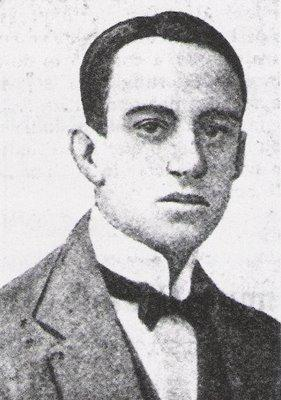
José Alvalade founded Sporting with the backing of his grandfather.

The club also organized parties and picnics. Eventually, during one picnic, on 12 April 1906, discussions erupted, as some members argued that the club should only be focused on organizing picnics, balls and other social events, with another group contended that the club should be focused on sports instead. Some time later, José Gavazzo, José Alvalade and 17 other members left the club, with José Alvalade saying: "I'll go to my grandad and he'll give me money to create another club." As such, a new club, without a name, was founded on 8 May 1906, and on 26 May, it was named "Campo Grande Sporting Clube". The Viscount of Alvalade, whose money and land helped found the club, was the first president of Sporting. José Alvalade, as one of the main founders and first club member (sócio), uttered on behalf of himself and his fellow co-founders: "We want this club to be a great club, as great as the greatest in Europe." Beyond José Holtreman Roquette (José Alvalade) and his grandfather Alfredo das Neves Holtreman (Viscount of Alvalade), among the founders were also the brothers António, José and Francisco Stromp, the Gavazzo brothers, José Maria do Couto Valente da Ponte and José Ferreira Roquette. Two months later, on 1 July 1906, António Félix da Costa Júnior suggested the name Sporting Clube de Portugal, and since 1920 that is the club's foundation date.

=== Early years (1907–1946) ===
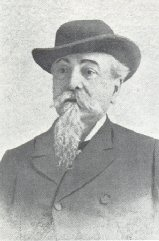
Alfredo Holtreman, Viscount of Alvalade was the first president, sponsor and protector of Sporting.

The year 1907 marked some "firsts" for the club, as Sporting played the first football match of their history on 3 February, ending in a 5–1 defeat against third division club Cruz Negra; inaugurated their first ground, known as "Sítio das Mouras" (the most advanced in Portugal at the time, equipped with showers, two tennis courts, an athletics track and a football field) on 4 July; and played the first derby of all time against local rivals S.L. Benfica (then known as Grupo Sport Lisboa) on 1 December. As early as 1909, the following sports were practised at the sports club: football, running and jumping (athletics), physical exercise (gymnastics), rope-wrestling, tennis, cricket and field hockey.

The club also released their first report card on 31 March 1922, titled "Boletim do Sporting" (Sporting's Report), lending the foundation for the later called "Jornal do Sporting", the official newspaper of the club, that still exists today.

Sporting played their first Primeira Liga game (the 1st Division of Portuguese football) ever on 20 January 1935, winning 0–6 against Académica de Coimbra. A year later, in 1936, the club had their heaviest ever defeat against Porto, losing 10–1. Sporting, however, got their revenge a year later, when they humbled the same team with a 9–1 result. In 1941, under the guidance of Hungarian manager József Szabó, the club celebrated the first league title of their history.

=== Golden years and fading (1946–1982) ===
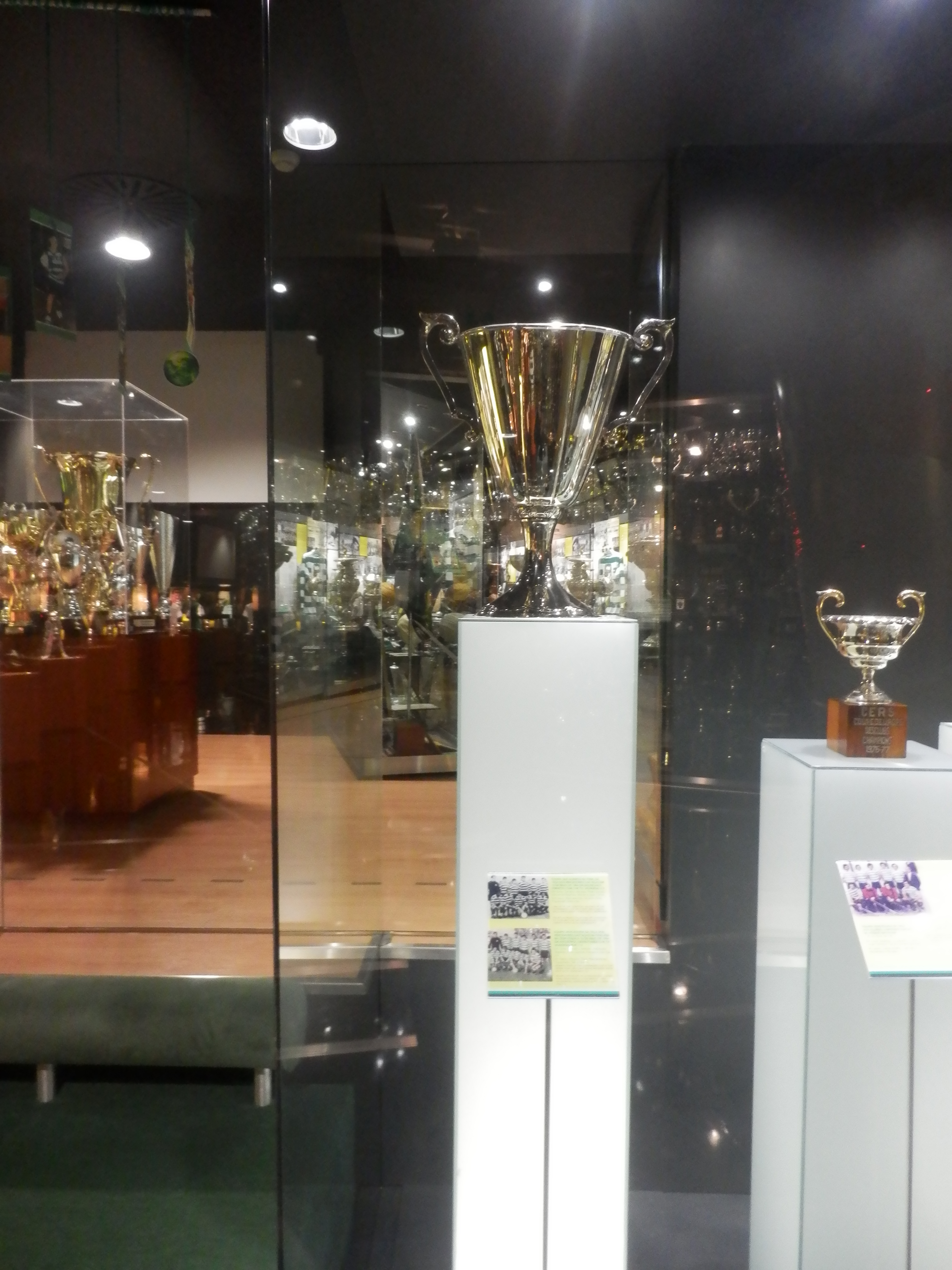
The 1963-64 UEFA Cup Winners' Cup won by Sporting at Museum Mundo Sporting

The football team had their height during the 1940s and 1950s. It was spearheaded by Fernando Peyroteo, José Travassos, Albano Pereira, Jesus Correia and Manuel Vasques, in a quintet nicknamed "The Five Violins". With the violins' help, Sporting won seven league titles in eight seasons between 1947 and 1954, including a then unprecedented four in a row from 1950 to 1951 onwards. Fernando Peyroteo, the most known of "the violins", is considered one of the greatest Portuguese players of all time.

Sporting and the Yugoslavian team Partizan both made history on 4 September 1955, as they played the first-ever UEFA Champion Clubs' Cup match. Sporting player João Martins scored the first-ever goal of the competition, on the 14th minute. The match ended in a 3–3 draw. Sporting also inaugurated their new venue, José Alvalade Stadium, on 10 June 1956, which would be their home ground until 2003.

In the 1960s, Sporting achieved continental success, winning the 1963–64 UEFA Cup Winners' Cup, defeating MTK Budapest of Hungary in the final. It was the only time a Portuguese team side won a UEFA Cup Winners' Cup title. The team entered the competition defeating Atalanta in the qualifying round, then past Cypriot club APOEL in what was the biggest win in a single UEFA competitions game to date: 16–1, a record that still stands today. On the next round, they lost 4–1 to Manchester United at Old Trafford in the first hand, but made a remarkable comeback at home, winning 5–0. In the semi-finals, Sporting eliminated Lyon, and in the end MTK Budapest, in a two-round final to win their first European title. The winning goal was scored by João Morais from a direct corner kick.

Under the leadership of president João Rocha, the first project of club-company in Portugal was approved by Sporting CP's affiliated partners (sócios) in November 1973, and denominated "Society of Constructions and Planning" (SCP, Sociedade de Construções e Planeamento). The Portuguese government authorised the establishment of the company and the issue of 2.5 million shares, with a nominal value of 100 escudos each. The club-company project with issuance of stock was hampered shortly after due to the events of the Carnation Revolution of 1974 and the subsequent Processo Revolucionário em Curso of 1975 (the creation of Sociedades Anónimas Desportivas ("Public limited sports companies") would be later available in Portugal through a new legal status only introduced in the 1990s).

The club reached the semi-finals of the Cup Winners' Cup in 1974, but lost to eventual winners 1. FC Magdeburg of East Germany.

=== First league title drought (1982–2000) ===
Club emblem used from 1945 to 2001

English manager Malcolm Allison arrived at Sporting in 1981, and under his guidance the club won the domestic double (league title and Portuguese cup), in 1982. In the years between 1982 and 2000, Sporting suffered from a drought of titles. Despite defeating rivals Benfica 4–0 on aggregate to win the Portuguese Super Cup in 1987, Sporting fans had to wait until 1995 to see their team win some silverware after beating Marítimo 2–0 in the final of the 1995 Portuguese Cup. That victory granted Sporting a place in the following season's Portuguese Super Cup. After drawing 0–0 at the José Alvalade Stadium and securing a 2–2 draw at the Estádio das Antas, a replay match was held on 30 April 1996 at the Parc de Princes in Paris. Sporting won 3–0 with Sá Pinto scoring twice and Carlos Xavier scoring a stoppage time penalty. In the same 1995–96 season, Sporting also reached the Portuguese Cup Final but lost 3–1 to Benfica.

Highlights of this period of time also include a 7–1 victory over arch-rivals Benfica at the old José Alvalade Stadium on 14 December 1986. Sporting also reached the UEFA Cup semi-final in 1991, losing against Internazionale. Also, Barcelona and Real Madrid were both tied and defeated in Lisbon when playing against Sporting in the old UEFA Cup, in the 1986–87 and 1994–95 seasons, respectively.

In 1998, Sporting had created the Sporting Clube de Portugal – Futebol, SAD, a public limited sports company for its football department, which went public on the Lisbon Stock Exchange in that year at a price of 1,000 escudos (the equivalent of about five euros at the time) per share.

=== The turn of the millennium (2000–2002) ===
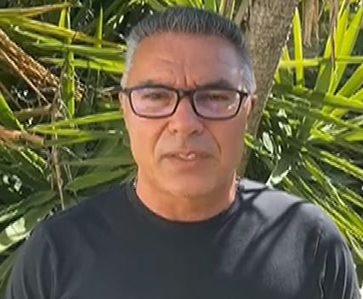
Sporting CP's manager and former player Augusto Inácio won the Primeira Liga title in 2000

In 2000, Sporting, led by manager Augusto Inácio (a former Sporting player, who replaced Giuseppe Materazzi at the beginning of the season), won the league title on the last match day, with a 4–0 victory over Salgueiros, ending an 18-year drought. In the following season, Sporting conquered the 2000 Super Cup but came third in the league. In the 2001–02 season, led by coach László Bölöni, Sporting conquered their 18th league title, the Portuguese Cup and the 2002 Portuguese Super Cup. On 21 June 2002, the club had opened its training facility, located in Alcochete, 30 km east of Lisbon.

On 14 August 2002, Cristiano Ronaldo, then 17, played his first official match for a Sporting CP's senior team, in a UEFA Champions League qualifying round at home against Inter Milan. On 1 September 2002, in the Azores, Cristiano Ronaldo debuted as a senior player in official domestic competitions playing for Sporting CP B in a 2–1 away loss against Sport Clube Lusitânia and on 29 September he made his debut in the Primeira Liga, playing for Sporting CP's main team in a way match against SC Braga.

=== Second league title drought (2002–2021) ===
==== 2002–2009 ====
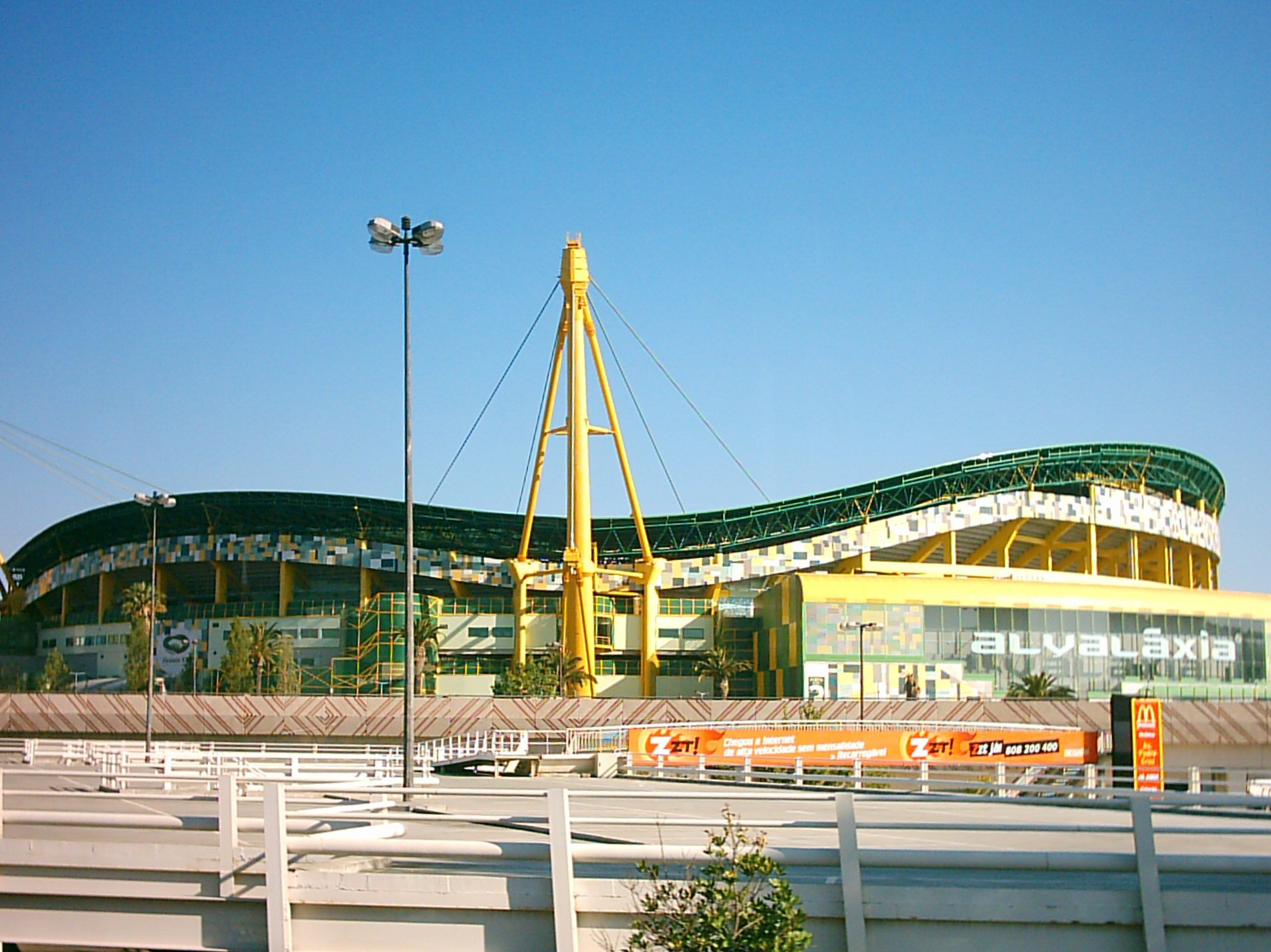
A new stadium, Estádio José Alvalade, was inaugurated in 2003.

Sporting have failed to win Primeira Liga again since 2002. On 6 August 2003, the new Sporting CP's stadium, the Estádio José Alvalade, was inaugurated. In the 2004–05 season, José Peseiro-led Sporting was leading the Primeira Liga and was trailing a remarkable journey in UEFA Cup. However, at the end of the season, the team eventually lost all the chances of winning any trophy that season: the first set-back had already happened on 26 January 2005 when Sporting was eliminated from Taça de Portugal after losing 7–6 on penalties against Benfica. Nevertheless, Sporting was able to reach the leadership of Primeira Liga, and on 5 May the team booked their second European final, after defeating Dutch team AZ in UEFA Cup. While awaiting the Final, on 14 May, Sporting lost its penultimate match in Primeira Liga against Benfica and dropped to third place. By the end of the season, the team eventually finished 2004–05 Primeira Liga in that place. Lastly, playing the 2005 UEFA Cup Final at their home ground, on 18 May, Sporting lost 1–3 against Russian side CSKA Moscow, after being 1–0 up at halftime.

Domestically, Sporting had back-to-back wins in the Portuguese Cup in 2007 and 2008 (led by coach Paulo Bento). Sporting also reached, for the first time, the knockout phase of UEFA Champions League, in the 2008–09 season, but were roundly defeated by Bayern Munich, with an aggregate loss of 12–1. This is widely regarded as one of the lowest points in the history of the club. The club almost reached another European final in 2012, but were dropped out of the competition by Athletic Bilbao, in the semi-finals of the 2011–12 Europa League.

==== Financial mismanagement and 2013 election ====
After years of financial mismanagement, Sporting had amassed debts exceeding €276 million by 2011. The results on the pitch were also negative, with Sporting finishing seventh in the 2012–13 Primeira Liga, their lowest ever finish. Managerial changes occurred within months or weeks apart: from November 2009 to May 2013, nine managers were contracted, with none of them lasting an entire season. In 2013, after pressure from club members, president Godinho Lopes resigned, and shortly afterwards, Bruno de Carvalho was elected president in a snap election. Carvalho intended to return success to the football team, while threatening to take Godinho Lopes to court, and to renegotiate the club's debt payment schedule with the banks involved, which eventually renegotiated the debt in very favourable conditions for Sporting CP in the following years as part of the club's financial restructuring started by Carvalho and finalized by Frederico Varandas ten years later. This allowed Sporting CP to get a multimillion-euro debt relief – in contrast to their rivals. Carvalho's election brought Angolan investors to the club, most notably Álvaro Sobrinho, through Holdimo, which ultimately took possession of 20 million shares of Sporting's SAD through conversion of convertible debt.

On 5 June 2015, it was released an audit that analyzed the management of Sporting in the past 20 years: it concluded that in 1994 the club had €55 million worth of real estate assets and an almost nonexistent debt; by 2013, real estate assets were almost nonexistent, and the club had amassed a €331 million debt. Their new stadium (completed in 2003) cost 74% more than what was expected when its construction started (€184 million against the planned €106 million), while their training facility cost 24% more, and the costs of Alvalade XXI neighbourhood, a real estate complex located around the stadium, overshot its estimate by 60%; such complex was almost entirely sold in the following years, many estates of which were sold below market prices.

From 1995 to 2013, the club invested €261 million in the football team, however, with few sports and financial results. The audit criticized many football transfers in the 2000s, in which the club paid commissions well above market prices to player agents, and discovered that Sporting even had paid commissions without evidence of written contracts. The audit also concluded that the administrations from 1995 to 2013 intended to convert Sporting, a multi-sports club, exclusively into a football club – although they did not openly admitted so – which was being done gradually through the closure of other sport modalities. Moreover, the audit also pointed out evidence of mismanagement and conflicts of interest by several administrators. Considering the audit's results, club members approved the expulsion of Godinho Lopes as an associate of the club in June 2015.

==== 2013–2020 ====
Club emblem used from 2001 to 2026

Led by coach Leonardo Jardim in the 2013–14 season, Sporting finished second in the league, thus gaining direct access to the 2014–15 UEFA Champions League, their first Champions League presence in five years.

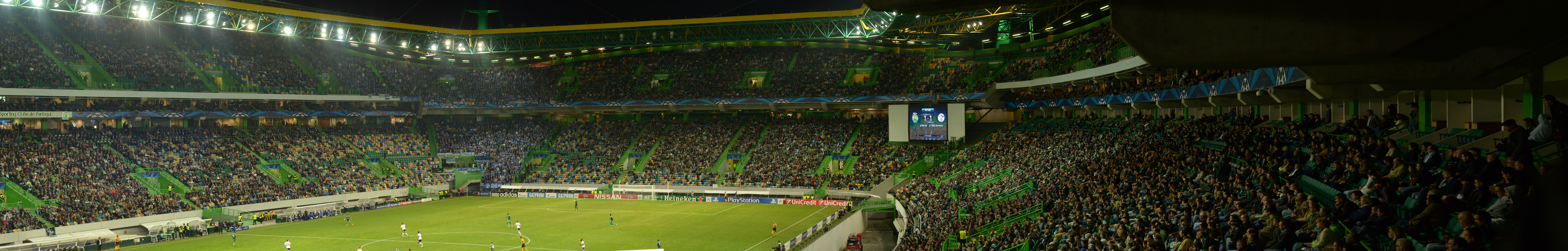
Sporting playing a home match against German club Schalke 04 for the 2014–15 UEFA Champions League group stage

In the 2014–15 season, Sporting won their 16th Portuguese Cup in dramatic fashion. The Lisbon side, led by Marco Silva, played the final against Braga, and after a disastrous start, found themselves losing 0–2 at half-time and playing with ten men after the sending-off of Cédric Soares. With the final seemingly lost, Islam Slimani gave some hope to the fans as he scored the 1–2 on the 83-minute. In stoppage time, Fredy Montero managed to equalize, forcing extra-time. Sporting ultimately won the match 3–1 on penalties. Celebrations ended in a pacific pitch invasion of Estádio José Alvalade by the fans, as the club touched silverware for the first time in seven years.

In June 2015, Jorge Jesus joined Sporting after Benfica opted not to renew his contract as coach of the club, signing a three-year contract. Presented as the new manager of the club on 1 July, the managerial change took the rivalry of both Lisbon clubs to new heights. Under Jesus' tenure, Sporting won the Portuguese Super Cup for the eighth time, against back-to-back champions Benfica. Despite a positive start, Sporting did not win any other trophy, finishing second in the Primeira Liga with 86 points, two points behind Benfica, despite breaking their own points record in the league.

Following a trophyless season, Sporting won their first Taça da Liga on a penalty shoot-out against Vitória de Setúbal. However, on 15 May 2018, days after finishing third in the league, several players and coaches were attacked by around 50 ultra supporters of Sporting at the club's training ground (9 of them would be sentenced to at least a specified term of actual imprisonment after trial). Five days later, Sporting lost the Portuguese Cup final to Aves. About a month later, Bruno de Carvalho was dismissed by club members after a general assembly on 23 June. This followed the rescissions of nine players: Bruno Fernandes, Daniel Podence, Rui Patricio, Rodrigo Battaglia, Rafael Leão, Rúben Ribeiro, Bas Dost, Gelson Martins and William Carvalho. Sporting would be later eligible for court-awarded compensation when the rescissions were declared illegal for those players who did not return to the club or were not sold by Sporting.

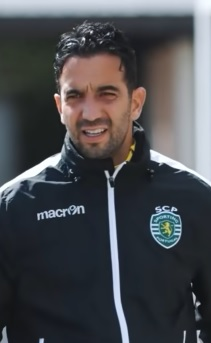
Ruben Amorim during a training session in 2021, the year he led Sporting CP to its first Primeira Liga title under his leadership as manager of the team

In the period before scheduled elections, a management committee, headed by former President Sousa Cintra as acting president of the sports club, succeeded in returning some of the players who had left the club following the incident, namely Bruno Fernandes, Bas Dost and Rodrigo Battaglia. Frederico Varandas was elected president on 8 September 2018. Having replaced Jorge Jesus at the beginning of the 2018–19 season, José Peseiro was sacked after a poor performance on the Primeira Liga.

In March 2019, Sporting CP announced a loan negotiated with Apollo Global Management, based on the securitization of NOS' television rights revenues.

In March 2020, Ruben Amorim was appointed manager of Sporting CP for a managerial transfer worth €10 million (£8.65 million), becoming the third-most expensive manager ever.

=== 2020–present: The Amorim Era and newfound domestic success ===
In the 2020–21 season, with no spectators allowed in Portugal due to COVID-19 restrictions, and after being eliminated from European competition by LASK Linz, Sporting won their third league cup and ended their 19-year period without winning the Portuguese league, with only one loss (against Benfica in the penultimate round and already as champions), securing their 19th Primeira Liga title after a 1–0 home win against Boavista. At the 2021–22 UEFA Champions League group stage, Sporting made a comeback by finishing second on Group C after a 5–1 home loss to Ajax and 1–0 away loss to Borussia Dortmund, thereby reaching the knockout phase for only the second time since the 2008–09 season. Domestically, both the 2021 Supertaça Cândido de Oliveira and the 2021–22 Taça da Liga were won by the Lions, securing the trophies against Braga and Benfica, respectively. In the 2021–22 Primeira Liga, Sporting finished second with the same 85 points as in the previous league campaign. In the 2023–24 league season, Sporting record signing Viktor Gyökeres helped propel the club to their 20th Primeira liga title, won on the fifth of May after Benfica's 2–0 loss to Famalicão.

In the 2024-25 season, after an initial winning streak lasting for 11 rounds, to give Sporting a 5-point lead, coach Ruben Amorim announced his departure to sign with Manchester United. Not before leading Sporting to a 4-1 home win against Pep Guardiola's Manchester City for the 2024-25 UEFA Champions League League Phase on the 4th round - Sporting would go on to lose with Borussia Dortmund on the knockout phase play-offs. His last Primeira Liga game saw Sporting make a comeback to win 2-4 at SC Braga for the 11th round. After a failed 8-match tenure for João Pereira, former Portugal capped and Sporting right-back, between November and late December, Rui Borges took over, starting off with a 1-0 home win against SL Benfica and led the club to win the Primeira Liga for Sporting's 21st Primeira Liga title - and first back-to-back win in over 71 years, since the 1953/54 season. This marked Sporting's third League title win in the previous 5 seasons of Portuguese football, marking a new era of increasing domestic dominance and hegemony. Swedish striker Viktor Gyökeres again topped the goalscoring chart, with 39 goals in 33 League games (having scored an impressive 53 times in 51 season overall matches), making him a top contender for the 2024-25 European Golden Shoe.

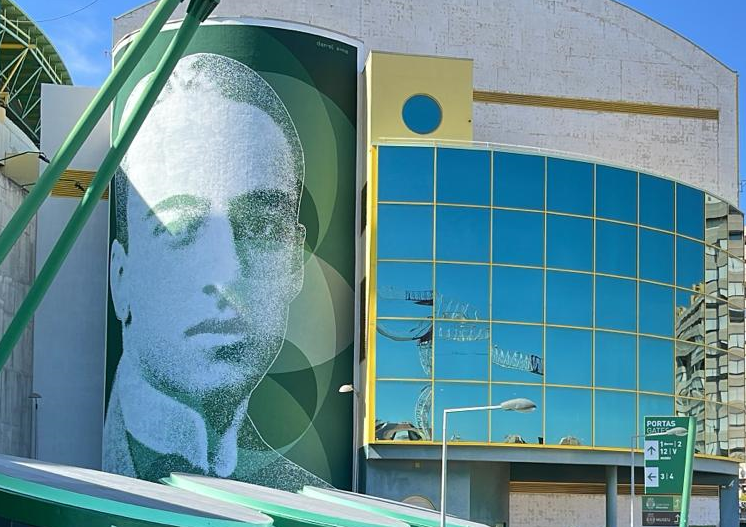
New José Alvalade's image at the Estádio José Alvalade in Lisbon, Portugal, during the execution of a work of building renovation in 2023

For the 2022–2026 quadrennium, Frederico Varandas' administration started works of building renovation and modernization of the club's facilities. In December 2023, Sporting and its SAD had gone ahead with a financial restructuring started in 2019 on the grounds of earlier agreements with creditors jump-started by Bruno de Carvalho which included the renegotiation of bank debt, "extinguishing the debt originally belonging to Novo Banco (with outstanding capital of 35,403,508.62 euros), with the exception of finance leases", the company announced in a statement sent to the Portuguese Securities Market Commission (CMVM). A debt belonging to Millennium BCP was also settled. In addition, Sporting announced it would own 88 per cent of Sporting SAD from 15 February 2024 onwards, instead of the 83.90% it owned at the time. With the completion of the restructuring, the club said it intended to start a new strategic financial planning and secure the entry of a minority investor in its Futebol, SAD.

== Motto, crests, kits, mascot and names ==
=== Motto ===
Since its formation, Sporting CP's motto is: "Effort, Dedication, Devotion and Glory" (Esforço, Dedicação, Devoção e Glória).

=== Crests ===
The stylized rampant lion of the crest was taken by the Viscount of Alvalade from the heraldry of Dom Fernando de Castello-Branco, Mayor of Cascais and the main promoter of football at Sporting Club de Cascais (widely known at the time as Sporting Club da Parada). However, Castello-Branco demanded that the color used by the new sports club should not be blue, since that was already a color adopted by Sporting Club da Parada. To keep up with times, the club's emblem has been modernized throughout history and this led to the development of various crests consistent with the history of the club: in all of them, the rampant lion and the color green, as well as the full name of the club (Sporting Clube de Portugal) or its initials (SCP), have always been present in prominence. Since its founding on the 1st July 1906, Sporting has already had five emblems, in addition to two commemorating crests for the fiftieth (1956) and the one hundredth years of existence (2006) of the club.

Sporting CP logo history
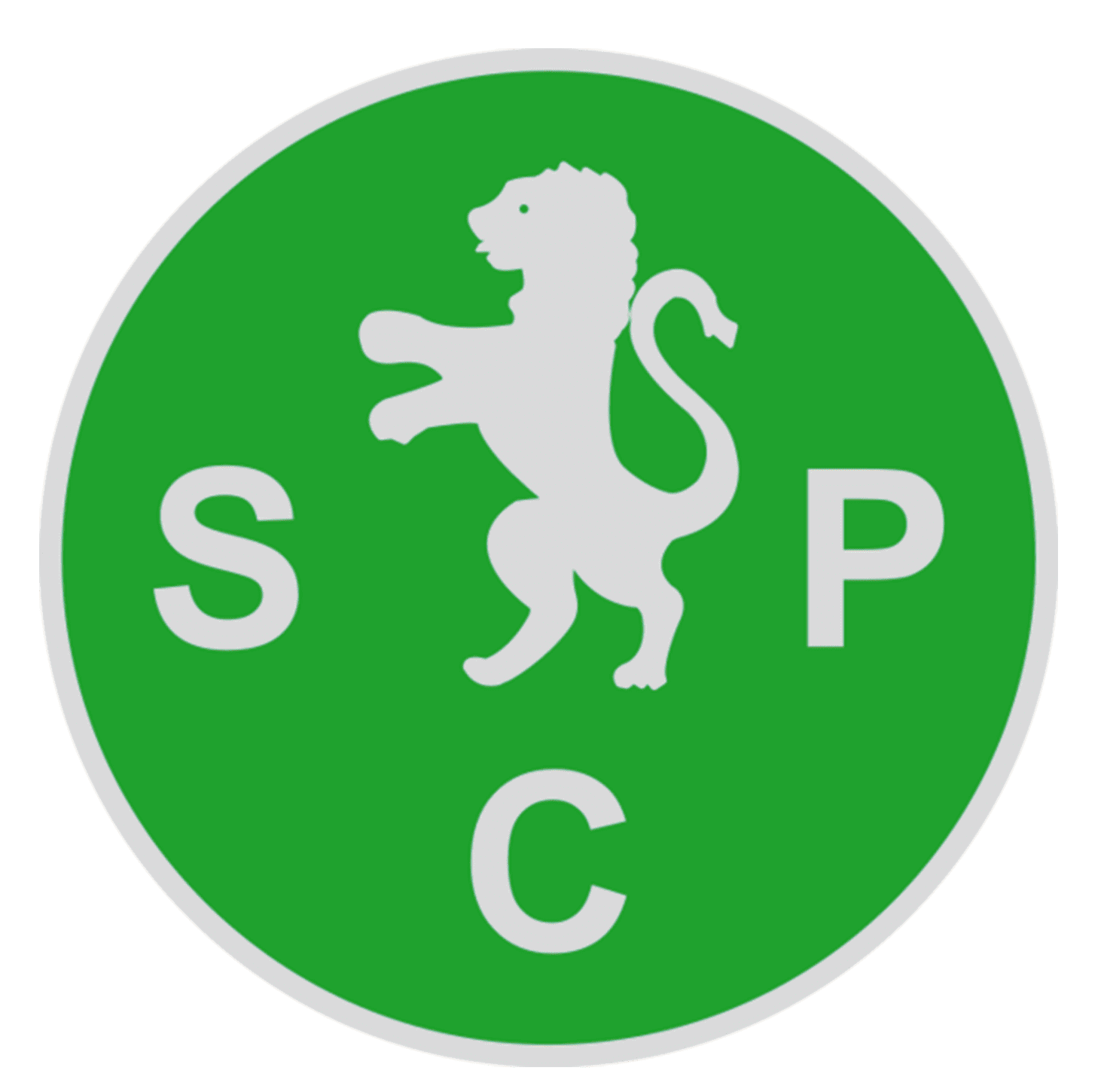
1907-1913

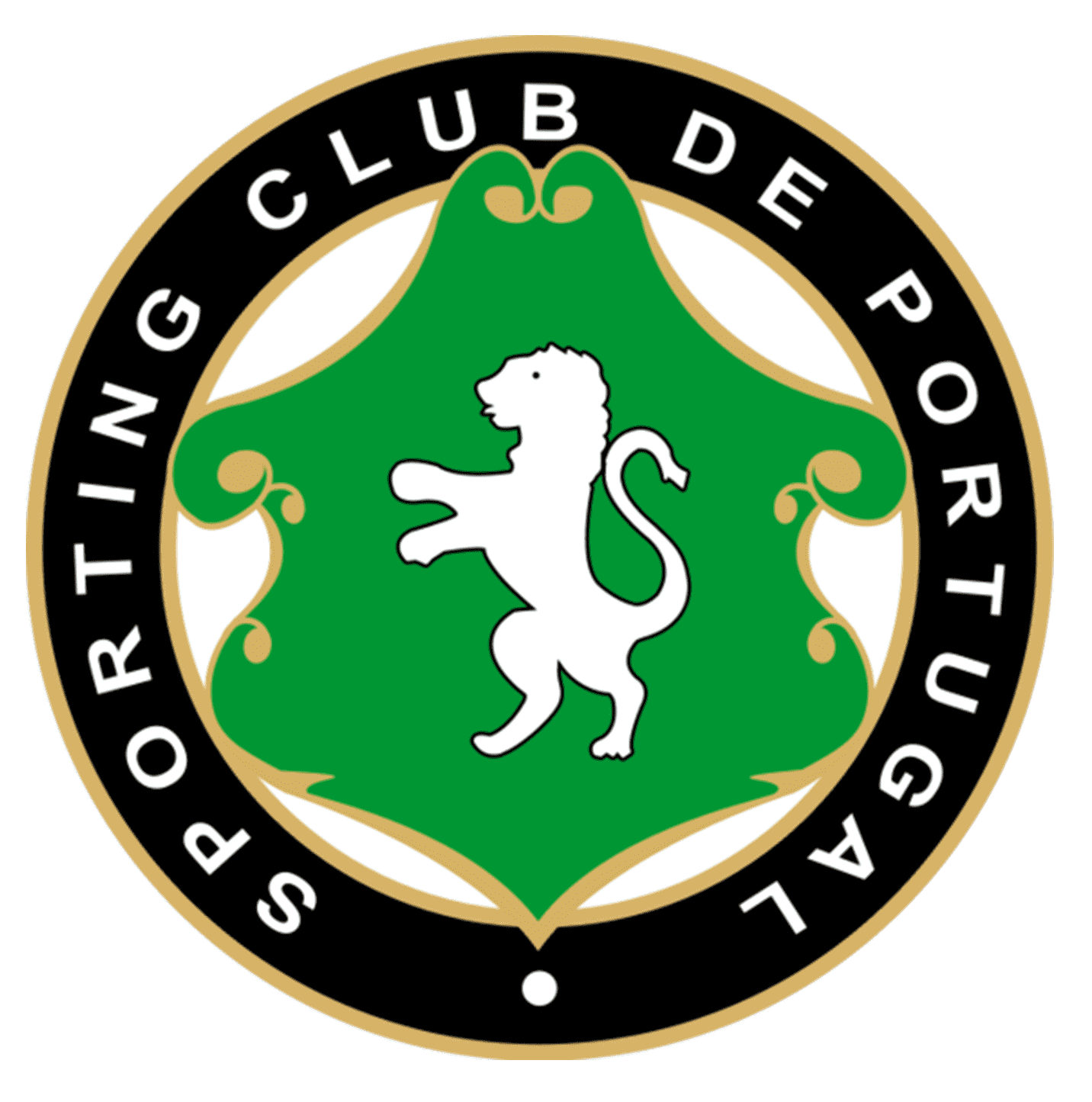
1913-1930

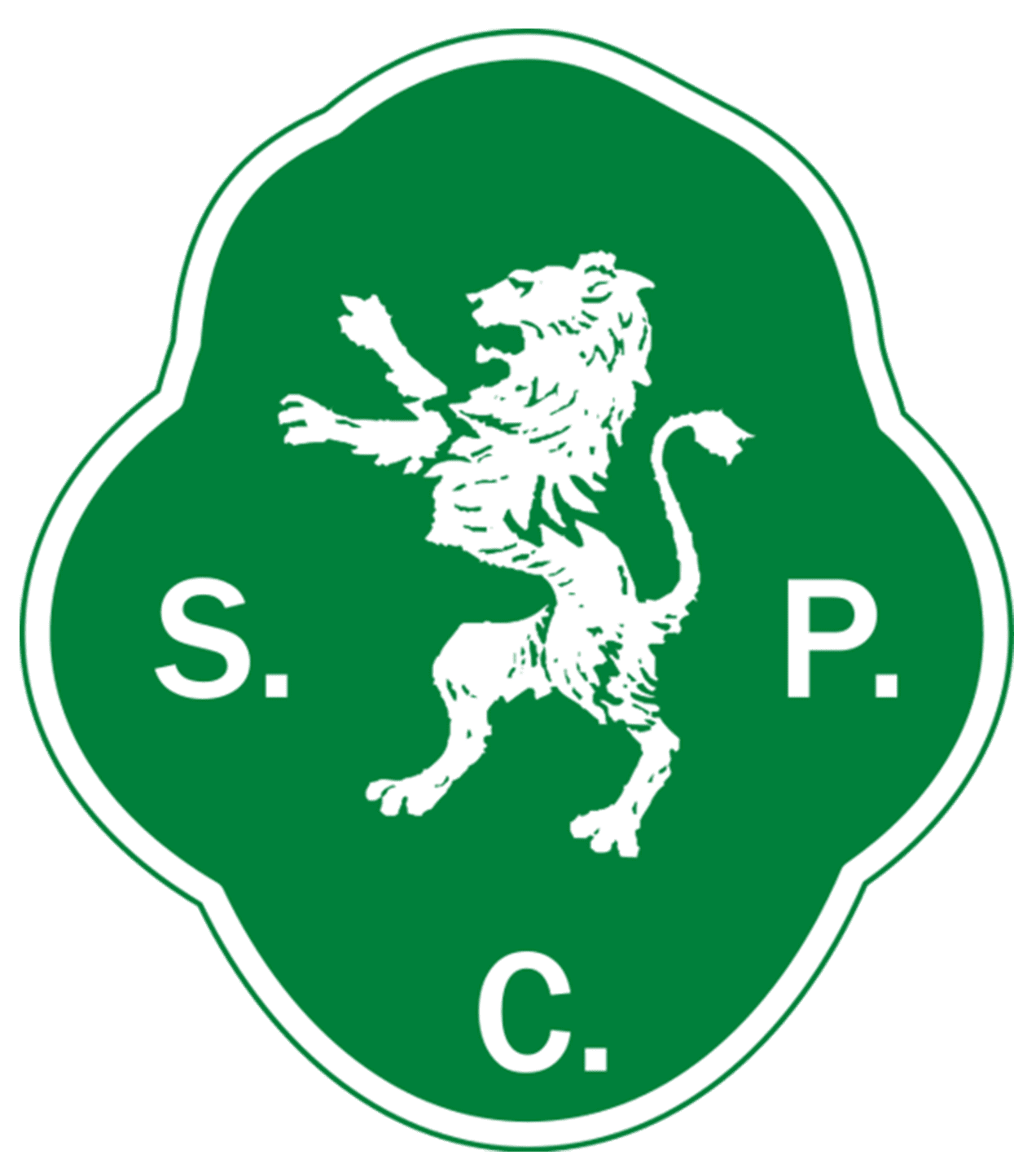
1930-1945

1945-2001

2001-2026

2026-onwards

In 2001, Sporting CP radically changed its emblem to convey a message of modernity, more geared towards the new technologies at the time. The current emblem presents an image with simplified framing while maintaining the green color in the shield and adding three horizontal white stripes that symbolize the club's shirt. Complemented with the words 'Sporting' and 'Portugal', now written in full, they emphasize the national dimension of the club and clarify its name internationally. A stylized rampant lion appears in golden color and the acronym "SCP", which stands for the club's name (Sporting Clube de Portugal), is shown like a crown on top of the shield.

As of 2026, the club has changed its emblem. It was unveiled on the first of July 2026, the club's 120th birthday.

=== Kits ===
When the club was founded in 1906, its players wore white jerseys. On 25 October 1908, Sporting presented the first ten football shirts that would come to be known as the Stromp kit. The initiative came from founder Eduardo Quintela de Mendonça. The Stromp kit is split at the top, with the right half white and the left half painted green. It was named in honour of one of the club's main founders, Francisco Stromp, and it had white shorts, with the shorts changing to black in 1915. It stopped being used as the main jersey in 1928. On 6 November 1927, the horizontally striped green and white jerseys that Salazar Carreira, sportsman and sports manager linked to the club since 1912, had chosen for the club's rugby team in 1926 were worn by the football team for the first time in a friendly match against Casa Pia, but after that the Stromp kit continued to be used. When Sporting's football team travelled to Brazil in July 1928, and after considering the weather conditions in that country, it was decided to wear the horizontally striped jerseys because they were lighter and tighter to the body. On their return, the Sporting's football team once again wore the traditional split jerseys known as the Stromp kit. However, on 5 October 1928, in a match against Benfica, whether it was because of the heavy rain that made them too heavy, or for some other reason, at half-time the players swapped their usual jerseys for the striped ones, thus establishing what is still the club's main kit today: green and white horizontally striped jersey with black shorts.

=== Mascot ===
The club's mascot is called Jubas, plural of the Portuguese word for mane, and is an anthropomorphic version of a lion wearing customized standard equipment and attire worn by the players of Sporting CP's main team. It also wears official Loja Verde (Sporting CP's official store) garment in both charity and promotional marketing initiatives.

=== Names ===
Founded on 1 July 1906, after two months during which the newly created sports club project was temporarily called Campo Grande Sporting Club (after Campo Grande), instead of its final official name, Sporting Clube de Portugal, which could be literally translated as "Sporting Club of Portugal", the club is officially referred to by UEFA and FIFA as written in its official full name or as "Sporting CP", a shortened form of the name. The designation "Sporting Lisbon", a common way some foreign media and non-Portuguese speaking people use to refer to Sporting CP outside Portugal, has been a source of contention and controversy for some sportinguistas because it does not conform with the official name of the sports club and its brand value. Regarding this issue, club supporters and officials have promoted awareness campaigns to raise people's awareness nationwide and internationally, and the club changed its official crest in 2001 with a focus on the name of the club and its words "Sporting" and "Portugal" in mind.

== Support ==
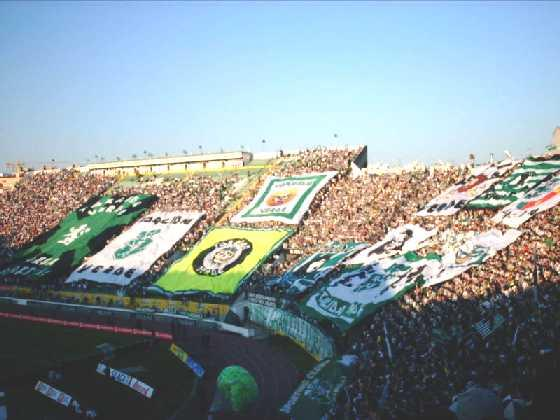
Sporting CP supporters at the old José Alvalade Stadium (1956–2003).

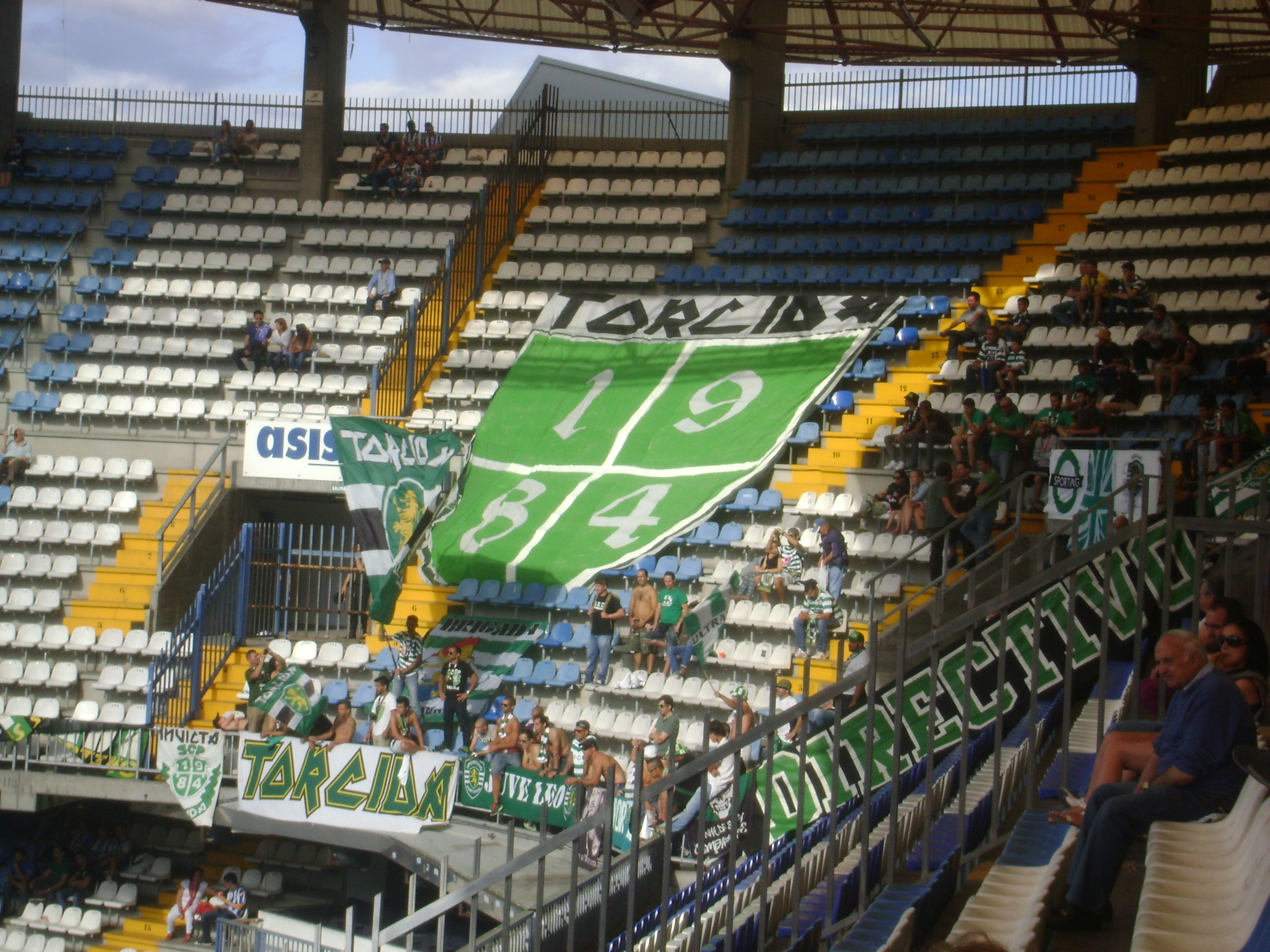
Sporting CP supporters at Riazor Stadium, (La Coruña) before a match by Teresa Herrera Trophy.

Sporting CP's supporters or fans are called sportinguistas. The club has 200,000 affiliated members (called sócios) and research studies have suggested it has a number of fans ranging from 2,000,000 to 2,500,000 in Portugal alone – which makes it the second or third most supported sports club in Portugal, depending on the study. Like the other two Portuguese Big Three sports clubs, Sporting CP has also a sizable number of foreign fans in other Portuguese-speaking countries beyond Portugal itself and supporters among the Portuguese expatriate community.

The club's anthem is the "Sporting's March" (original official name: "A Marcha do Sporting"). It was written in 1955 by songwriters Eduardo Damas and Manuel Paião and originally sung by Portuguese singer Maria José Valério. Sporting CP created and uses its own 'You'll Never Walk Alone'-style song, through a Portuguese version of the classic song popularised by Frank Sinatra 'My Way' called "O Mundo Sabe Que" that is performed by a massed chorus of supporters on match day. Other popular songs include "Só Eu Sei" and "Curva Belíssima" popularized by organized Sporting CP's supporter's group Juventude Leonina, and "Dia de Jogo", "Força Brutal" and "Voto Solene" sung by Sporting CP's-themed rock band Supporting.

Throughout its history the club and its supporters established centres, branches and delegations (núcleos, filiais e delegações) of Sporting CP across Portugal and abroad. Among them, branches such as Sporting Clube de Tomar (branch number 1), Farense (branch number 2), Olhanense (branch number 4), Covilhã (branch number 8) and Campomaiorense (branch number 27), and delegations such as Lusitânia (delegation number 14), became noted autonomous sports clubs that reached the top level of Portuguese league systems in sports like football, rink hockey or basketball. Founded in 1920, Sporting Clube de Lourenço Marques (branch number 6 until 1975 and later renamed as CD Maxaquene) was also a branch of Sporting CP in Mozambique, East Africa, and under this original name, Portuguese footballer Eusébio graduated as a footballer and played for the Mozambican club at both youth level and the main squad between the ages of 15 and 18. The centres were created and institutionalised in Sporting's 10th Club Statutes of 1984 and are characterised as being a group of sportinguistas who get together and organise themselves to promote, support, celebrate and publicise Sporting CP. Many of them are also involved in important recreational, social and sporting activities. The branches, more than 100 were founded around the world, are sports clubs that have associated themselves with Sporting CP's core values, are managed as autonomous sports clubs and contribute to the expansion of Sporting CP. The delegations are sporting, recreational and cultural institutions that represent the interests of Sporting CP in the places where they are based and mobilise the ideals of the club in those same regions.

== Rivalries ==
=== Lisbon derby ===
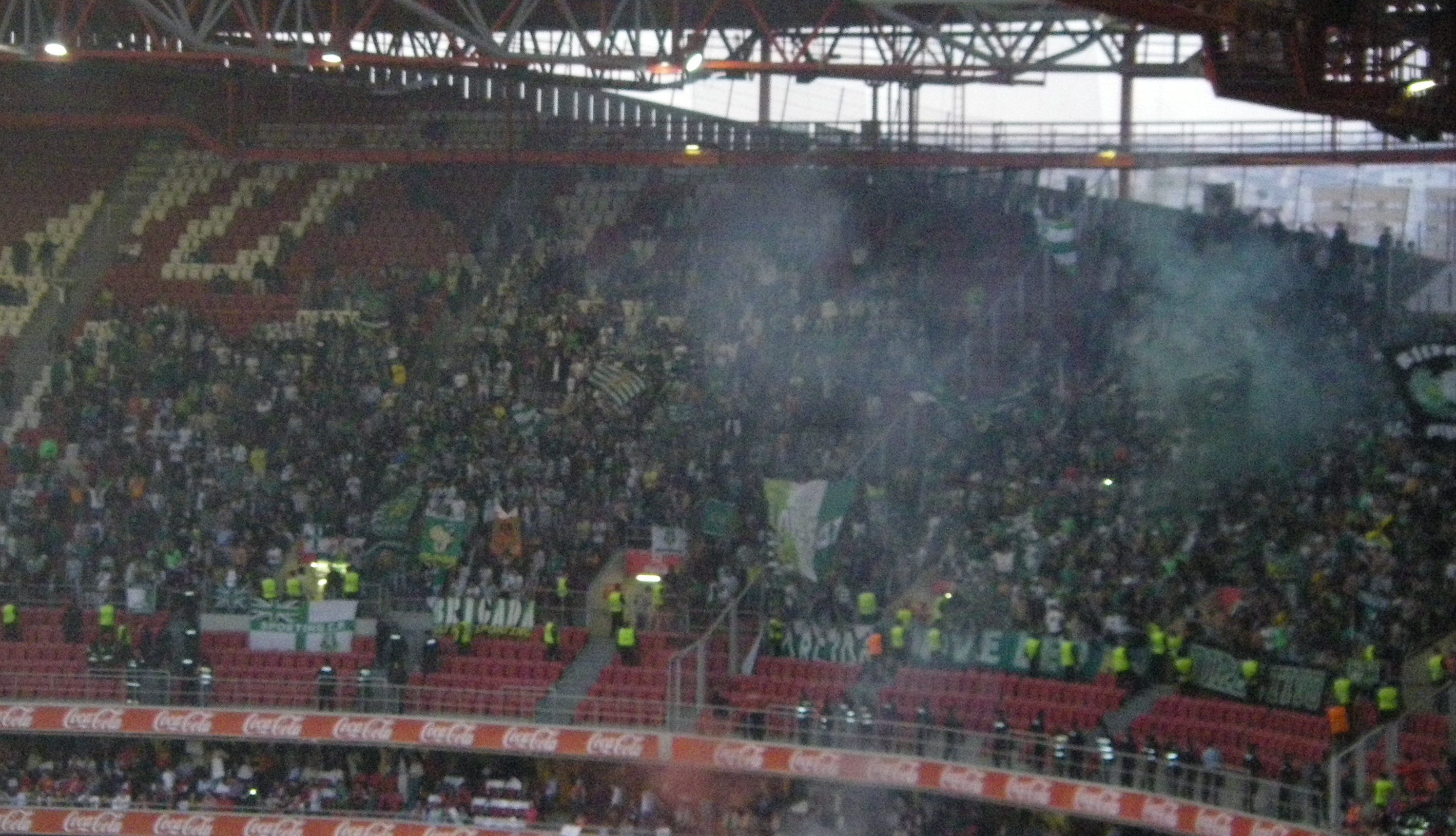
Sporting fans at the Estádio da Luz during the Lisbon derby (2013)

Sporting's main rivals are Benfica, with both teams contesting the Lisbon derby, also known as "the eternal derby", among other names. The local rivalry started in 1907 when eight Benfica players left for Sporting looking for better training conditions. The first derby was contested that year and ended with a 2–1 win for Sporting. One of Sporting's biggest defeats to Benfica, 7–2, happened at the original Estádio da Luz on 28 April 1948, and three 5–0 losses, in 1939, 1978 and 1986. The biggest Sporting win over Benfica, 7–1, occurred at the original Estádio José Alvalade on 14 December 1986. Manuel Fernandes was particularly inspired and scored four goals; Mário Jorge two and Ralph Meade one; Wando scored for Benfica.

Before the start of the 1993–94 season, Sousa Cintra, then president of Sporting, took advantage of Benfica's financial crisis by signing Paulo Sousa and Pacheco, who had terminated their contracts with the latter club. This event became known as "Verão Quente" (Hot Summer). Later, on 14 May 1994, a memorable derby was played at the old José Alvalade Stadium, crowded to the top, as winning the derby could be a decisive step for Sporting in trying to regain the title, which by that time they had not won for 12 years. Sporting were considered the favourites, with a squad composed by Luís Figo, Paulo Sousa, Krasimir Balakov, Ivaylo Yordanov, Emílio Peixe, Stan Valckx and others; therefore, Benfica were seen as the underdogs. However, Benfica defied the odds and won the match 6–3 and went on securing the league title weeks later, leaving Sporting empty-handed in one of the most dramatic seasons in their history. Two years later, the rivalry continued intense with a dramatic incident in the 1996 Portuguese Cup final, which Benfica won 3–1. After the latter scored the first goal, a supporter of the club lit a flare which eventually struck a Sporting fan in the chest, killing him instantly.

Eight years later, on 3 May 2004, Geovanni's winning goal for Benfica in the 87th minute at Alvalade caused a pitch invasion by Sporting fans. In November 2011, after a 1–0 loss to Benfica at the Estádio da Luz, Sporting supporters set fire to one of the stands of the stadium. Four years later, on 7 February 2015, during a futsal derby, members of No Name Boys, one of Benfica's unofficial supporters' groups, showed a banner saying "Very Light 96", in reference to the 1996 incident. The next day, during a football derby at Estádio José Alvalade, an official supporters' group of Sporting, Juve Leo, showed a banner with the inscription "Sigam o King" ("Follow the King"), in reference to Eusébio's death a month before.

=== Sporting vs Porto ===
Sporting has also a rivalry with Porto. Outside of the sports environment itself, the confrontation between Lions and Dragons represents a form of expression in sport, and in football in particular, of the political and regional differentiation between Lisbon and the North of Portugal. The confrontation captured the national imagination, having been remembered in the film O Leão da Estrela (1947) starring António Silva and Artur Agostinho, a classic of the Portuguese cinema, and in its remake of 2015 starring Miguel Guilherme.

Sporting and Porto have decided a competition 13 times. The first final won by Sporting took place only in 1978, at the Estádio Nacional, for the Taça de Portugal. The dispute was decided in two matches, a 1–1 draw and a 2–1 victory in the tie-breaker. There would be three more finals in the same location. In 1994, Porto also won the tiebreaker 2–1. In 2000, Porto won the tiebreaker again 2–0. And, in the 2007–08 Taça de Portugal Sporting won in extra time 2–0. In the 2019, after eleven years, Sporting won once again, with a 2–2 draw after extra time, with Sporting winning the penalty shootout 4–3.

Another four decisions between Porto and Sporting were for the Supertaça Cândido de Oliveira. In 1996, in a tie-breaker valid for the 1994–95 edition; in 2001, valid for the 1999–2000 edition; and in 2007 and 2008. In the first two finals, the matches were held over two legs in the fields of rivals, with tiebreakers in Paris (1996) and Coimbra (2001). In 2007 and 2008, under the format in force since 2001, the decisions took place in a single match held in Leiria and in the Algarve.

Another decision between the two clubs took place in 2019, counting for the 2018–19 Taça da Liga. The match took place in Braga, ending with a 3–1 victory on penalties, after a 1–1 draw in regular time.

== Finances and ownership ==
=== Results ===
In the 2022–2023 season, Sporting SAD's (Euronext Lisbon: SCP ) net income was €25.2 million for a record-breaking revenue of €222 million. The net debt stood at €141.796 million, a reduction in debt of €27 million comparing to the previous accounting period.

=== Ownership ===
By 2022, Sporting held 83.90% of Sporting SAD's capital (67.32% in category A shares and 16.58% in category B shares), which is listed on Euronext Lisbon, corresponding to 126,322,554 shares, and Álvaro Sobrinho, by keeping 20,000,000 shares in his possession, had a stake of 13.28%. The remaining shareholders had 2.82% of the stock. By December 2023, after a debt restructuring deal agreed with Portuguese banks Millennium bcp and Novobanco, Sporting announced it will consequently own 88 per cent of Sporting SAD. Sobrinho's stake was diluted to 9.9%.

== Facilities ==
=== Stadium ===
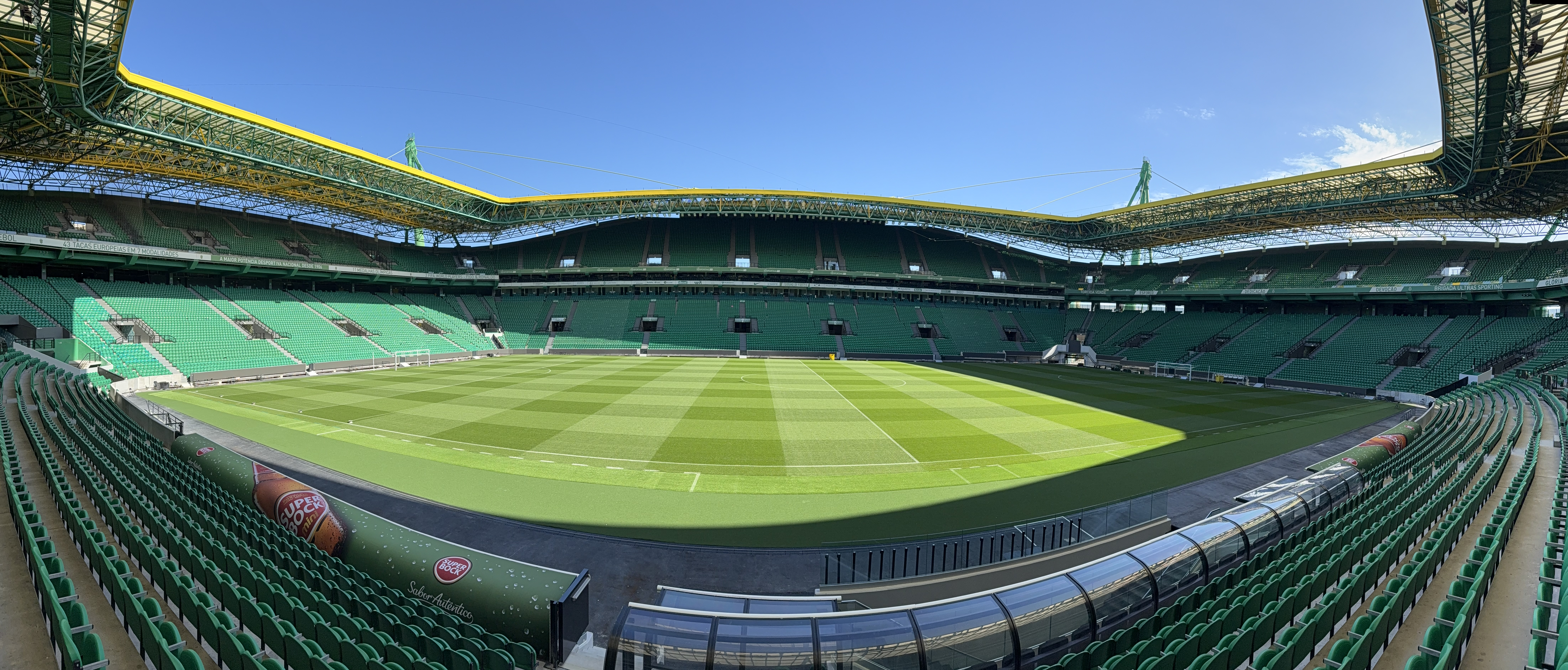
Estádio José Alvalade (inside view).

Throughout its history, Sporting has had several grounds. The first one was inaugurated on 4 July 1907, and was called "Sítio das Mouras". It was a state-of-the-art facility at the time and included changing rooms with individual lockers and changing rooms with showers and baths. It included a grass playing field for football and two tennis courts. It was considered luxurious and had also an athletics track. This was followed by the Estádio do Campo Grande (1917–1937) and the Estádio do Lumiar (1937–1956). In 1956, the first Estádio José Alvalade was inaugurated. Sporting played their matches there until 2003, when the stadium was demolished.

A new stadium, Estádio José Alvalade, was built and used during the UEFA Euro 2004, hosted by Portugal. Designed by Tomás Taveira, it was inaugurated on 6 August 2003 and the wider complex called Alvalade XXI included a shopping mall, cinemas, health center, office space, residential areas, club's museum, official club store and other infrastructure. The opening match was a 3–1 victory over Manchester United in a friendly game that marked the departure of Cristiano Ronaldo from Sporting CP. The stadium was awarded a 'five-star' certificate at 2005 UEFA Cup Final by then UEFA president Lennart Johansson. The stadium has a capacity of 52,095 spectators. The Multidesportivo Sporting, is a multi-sports arena located in a five-floor semi-detached building next to the stadium proper.

The stadium hosted quarter-finals and semi-finals matches during the 2019–20 UEFA Champions League, and recently has hosted the 2024–25 UEFA Women's Champions League final, an event that marked the last match played on the stadium before it underwent a remodling stage that will modernize the facilities, added more than 2,000 seats to the overall capacity and eliminated a much long contested and conterversial "pit" that existed between the seated stands and the pitch.

=== Academia Cristiano Ronaldo and youth academy ===
The Cristiano Ronaldo Academy is the center of all Sporting CP's football activity. It is the place where the Sporting CP professional football team has all its daily preparation and also serves as a hub for carrying out internships. It is at the Sporting Professional Academy of Football that Sporting hosts its support staff, which includes the directive, clinical and administrative components. On the other hand, the academy is also Sporting CP's Sports Training School.

Sporting's youth academy system helped develop Ballon d'Or recipients Luís Figo and Cristiano Ronaldo.

In the victorious campaign of Portuguese National Team in the Euro 2016 10 out of the 14 players who played the final against France were players "made in Sporting". Moreover, at the 2018 FIFA World Cup Sporting CP had 14 players that came through their youth system, making it the most represented youth academy system in the tournament, followed by Barcelona with eleven.

=== Pavilhão João Rocha ===
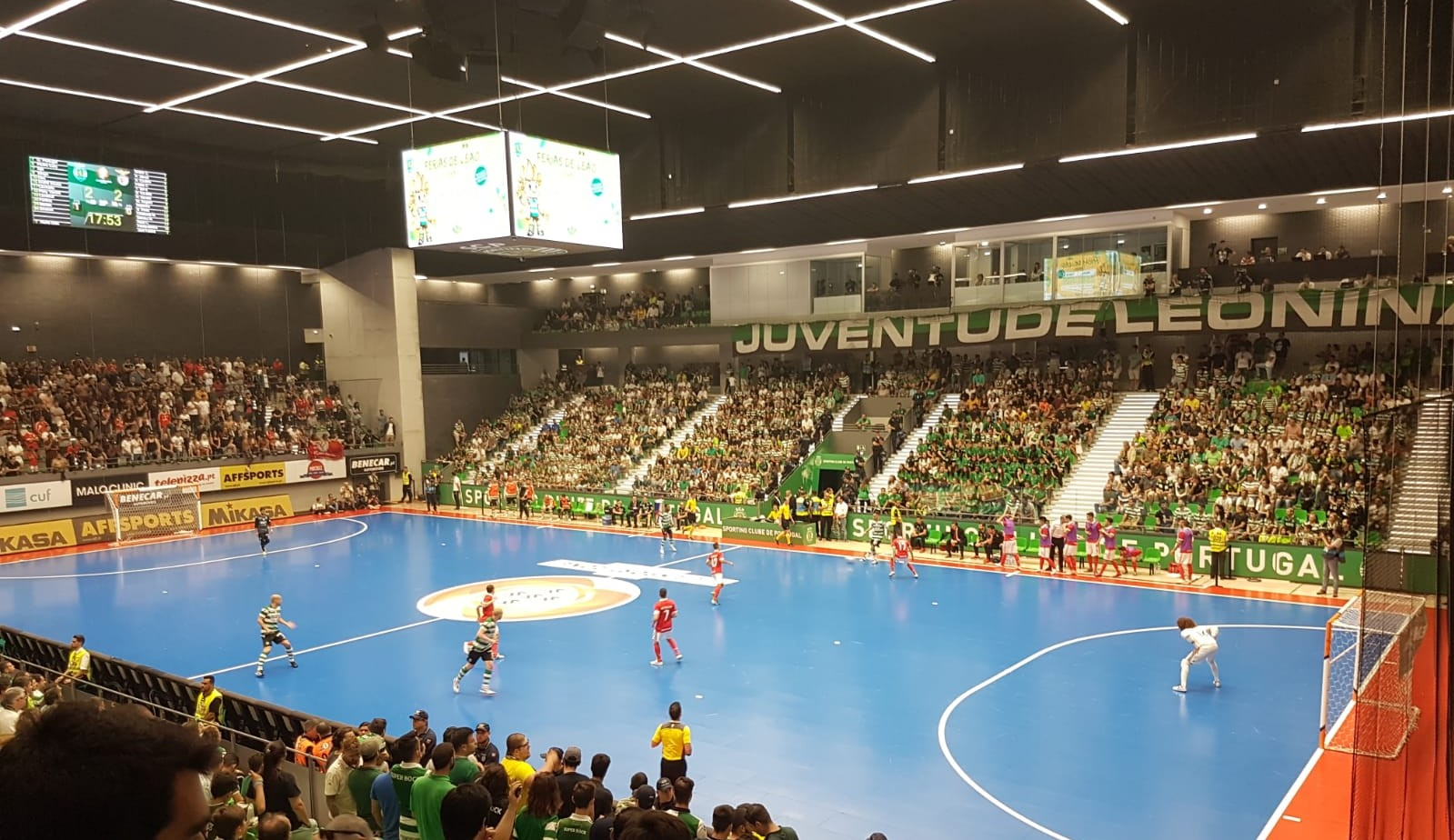
Pavilhão João Rocha during the 2017–18 Portuguese Futsal Championship finals between Sporting CP and Benfica

With a total capacity of 3,000 seats, spread over 4 stands and a corporate area, Sporting CP's indoor arena named after former Sporting CP's president João Rocha is the largest one in Portugal belonging to a sports club. Its dimensions meet the requirements for all indoor team sports, with an automatic table system for roller hockey, and an advanced video and multimedia system. In the roundabout between the pavilion and the stadium, a monument was also inaugurated to evoke the club. Those who follow the path that surrounds the pavilion will find the Passeio da Fama (Walk of Fame) of Sporting CP's former and current athletic glories where the names of famous Sporting CP's players, athletes, coaching staff and executives such as António Livramento, Carlos Lopes, Dionísio Castro, Domingos Castro, Fernando Mamede, Fernando Peyroteo, Francis Obikwelu, Joaquim Agostinho, José Travassos, Manuel Fernandes, Mário Moniz Pereira, Miguel Maia, Naide Gomes, Patrícia Mamona and Teresa Machado, among many others, can be found. Next to the pavilion there is the Sporting CP's youth academy school Escola Academia Aurélio Pereira (named after the club's historical youth development principal Aurélio Pereira) with three 5-a-side football fields, with the aim of complementing the Pólo EUL (Sporting CP's facilities for U13 development footballers at the EUL – Estádio Universitário de Lisboa). One of the entrances to the pavilion gives access to a Loja Verde (the club's official store) and to a branch of the Sporting Museum, with a design more focused on virtual realities and the concept of a museum in real time. There is also an auditorium prepared to host conferences, training courses and special events. The Pavilion and all the surrounding space is prepared to host concerts and cultural events.

== Honours ==
=== Domestic competitions ===
- Primeira Liga: 21

1940–41, 1943–44, 1946–47, 1947–48, 1948–49, 1950–51, 1951–52, 1952–53, 1953–54, 1957–58, 1961–62, 1965–66, 1969–70, 1973–74, 1979–80, 1981–82, 1999–2000, 2001–02, 2020–21, 2023–24, 2024–25

- Taça de Portugal: 18

1940–41, 1944–45, 1945–46, 1947–48, 1953–54, 1962–63, 1970–71, 1972–73, 1973–74, 1977–78, 1981–82, 1994–95, 2001–02, 2006–07, 2007–08, 2014–15, 2018–19, 2024–25

- Taça da Liga: 4

2017–18, 2018–19, 2020–21, 2021–22

- Supertaça Cândido de Oliveira: 9

1982, 1987, 1995, 2000, 2002, 2007, 2008, 2015, 2021

- Campeonato de Portugal: 4

1922–23, 1933–34, 1935–36, 1937–38

=== International competitions ===
- European Cup Winners' Cup: 1

1963–64

== Players ==
=== Current squad ===
As of 1 September 2026

Note: Flags indicate national team as defined under FIFA eligibility rules; some limited exceptions apply. Players may hold more than one non-FIFA nationality.

No.	Pos.	Nation	Player
1	GK	POR	Rui Silva
4	MF	DEN	Silas Andersen
5	MF	ESP	Sergi Altimira
6	DF	BEL	Zeno Debast
7	FW	GRE	Fotis Ioannidis
8	MF	POR	João Simões
9	FW	POR	Rafael Nel
10	FW	MOZ	Geny Catamo
11	DF	POR	Nuno Santos
13	DF	GRE	Georgios Vagiannidis
17	MF	URU	Rodrigo Zalazar
18	DF	MAR	Moncef Zekri
19	FW	AUS	Nestory Irankunda
20	FW	URU	Maximiliano Araújo (3rd captain)
21	MF	BRA	Pedro Lima

No.	Pos.	Nation	Player
22	DF	ESP	Iván Fresneda (4th captain)
25	DF	POR	Gonçalo Inácio (captain)
28	FW	ENG	Jesse Derry (on loan from Chelsea)
30	GK	BRA	Kaique Pereira
31	FW	BRA	Luis Guilherme
41	GK	BRA	Diego Callai
50	DF	POR	Rodrigo Dias
55	DF	SEN	Ibrahima Ba
58	MF	POR	Flávio Gonçalves
72	DF	POR	Eduardo Quaresma (vice-captain)
73	DF	POR	Eduardo Felicíssimo
77	MF	ITA	Issa Doumbia
97	FW	COL	Luis Suárez
99	GK	POR	Francisco Silva

=== Out on loan ===
Note: Flags indicate national team as defined under FIFA eligibility rules; some limited exceptions apply. Players may hold more than one non-FIFA nationality.

No.	Pos.	Nation	Player
8	FW	POR	Pedro Gonçalves (on loan at Fiorentina until 30 June 2027)
15	FW	SEN	Souleymane Faye (on loan at Lorient until 30 June 2027)
19	DF	POR	Ricardo Mangas (on loan at Monza until 30 June 2027)
23	MF	POR	Daniel Bragança (on loan at Torino until 30 June 2027)

=== Other players under contract ===
Note: Flags indicate national team as defined under FIFA eligibility rules; some limited exceptions apply. Players may hold more than one non-FIFA nationality.

No.	Pos.	Nation	Player
52	MF	GRE	Sotiris Alexandropoulos

=== Sporting CP B ===
Sporting CP B is the reserve football team of Sporting CP and it currently plays in the Liga Portugal 2.

=== Sporting CP Youth Academy ===
Sporting CP Youth Academy is the youth development division of the club and hosts U23, U19, U17 and U15 youth teams.

== Player accolades ==
=== Portuguese League Top Goalscorer ===
The top scorer in the Portuguese League received the Bota de Prata from 1934/1935 to 1951/1952. Since the 1952/1953 season, the honour has been awarded by the sports newspaper A Bola, which awards the Bola de Prata.

Year	Winner	G
1934–35	(Portugal) Manuel Soeiro	14
1936–37	(Portugal) Manuel Soeiro	24
1937–38	(Portugal) Fernando Peyroteo	34
1939–40	(Portugal) Fernando Peyroteo	29^{1}
1940–41	(Portugal) Fernando Peyroteo	29
1945–46	(Portugal) Fernando Peyroteo	37
1946–47	(Portugal) Fernando Peyroteo	43

Year	Winner	G
1948–49	(Portugal) Fernando Peyroteo	40
1950–51	(Portugal) Manuel Vasques	29
1953–54	(Portugal) João Martins	31
1965–66	(Portugal) Ernesto Figueiredo	25*^{1}
1973–74	(Argentina) Héctor Yazalde	46^{2/3}
1974–75	(Argentina) Héctor Yazalde	30
1979–80	(Portugal) Rui Jordão	31

Year	Winner	G
1985–86	(Portugal) Manuel Fernandes	30
1987–88	(Brazil) Paulinho Cascavel	23
1992–93	(Portugal) Jorge Cadete	18
2001–02	(Brazil) Mário Jardel	42^{3}
2004–05	(Portugal) Liédson	25
2006–07	(Portugal) Liédson	15
2016–17	(Netherlands) Bas Dost	34

Year	Winner	G
2020–21	(Portugal) Pedro Gonçalves	23
2023–24	(Sweden) Viktor Gyökeres	29
2024–25	(Sweden) Viktor Gyökeres	39
2025–26	(Colombia) Luis Suárez	28

^{1}Shared; ^{2}Portuguese Record; ^{3}European Golden Shoe; *Didn't win Bola de Prata because needed more matches to score these goals

=== Player of the Year ===
The Player of the Year award is named after former player Francisco Stromp, and was instituted from 1992. The list below is a list of winners of the award.

Year	Winner
1992	(Bulgaria) Krasimir Balakov
1993	(Netherlands) Stan Valckx
1994	(Portugal) Luís Figo
1995	(Portugal) Oceano
1996	(Portugal) Ricardo Sá Pinto
1997	(Brazil) Marco Aurélio
1998	(Bulgaria) Ivaylo Yordanov

Year	Winner
1999	(Portugal) Delfim Teixeira
2000	(Argentina) Alberto Acosta
2001	(Portugal) Beto
2002	(Portugal) João Pinto
2003	(Portugal) Pedro Barbosa
2004	(Portugal) Rui Jorge
2005	(Portugal) João Moutinho

Year	Winner
2006	(Portugal) Ricardo
2007	(Portugal) Liédson
2008	(Portugal) Tonel
2009	(Portugal) Liédson
2010	(Portugal) Daniel Carriço
2011	(Portugal) Rui Patrício
2012	(Portugal) Rui Patrício

Year	Winner
2013	(Portugal) Adrien Silva
2014	(Portugal) William Carvalho
2015	(Portugal) Nani
2016	(Portugal) João Mário
2017	(Netherlands) Bas Dost
2018	(Portugal) Bruno Fernandes
2019	(Portugal) Bruno Fernandes

Year	Winner
2020	(Uruguay) Sebastián Coates
2021	(Portugal) João Palhinha (Portugal) Pedro Gonçalves
2022	(Spain) Antonio Adán
2023	(Portugal) Gonçalo Inácio
2024	(Sweden) Viktor Gyökeres
2025	(Denmark) Morten Hjulmand

=== Award winners ===
Awards received while playing for Sporting CP

European Golden Shoe

- (Argentina) Héctor Yazalde (46 goals) – 1974 (Portuguese Record)
- (Brazil) Mário Jardel (42 goals) – 2002

IFFHS World's Best Top Goal Scorer

- (Sweden) Viktor Gyökeres (62 goals) – 2024

African Footballer of the Year

- (Nigeria) Emmanuel Amunike – 1994

Bulgarian Footballer of the Year

- (Bulgaria) Krasimir Balakov – 1995
- (Bulgaria) Ivaylo Yordanov – 1998

Algerian Footballer of the Year

- (Algeria) Islam Slimani – 2013

Guldbollen

- (Sweden) Viktor Gyökeres – 2024

Danish Football Player of the Year

- (Denmark) Morten Hjulmand – 2024

UEFA European Under-21 Championship Player of the Tournament

- (Portugal) Luís Figo – 1994
- (Portugal) William Carvalho – 2015

FIFA U-20 World Cup Gold Ball

- Emílio Peixe – 1991 Portugal

UEFA European Under-17 Championship Player of the Tournament

- Miguel Veloso – 2003 Portugal

Portuguese Golden Ball

- (Portugal) Luís Figo – 1994
- (Brazil) Mário Jardel – 2002

CNID Footballer of the Year

- (Portugal) Rui Jordão – 1980
- (Portugal) António Oliveira – 1981, 1982
- (Portugal) Luís Figo – 1995
- (Brazil) Mário Jardel – 2002

LPFP Primeira Liga Breakthrough Player of the Year:

- (Portugal) Miguel Veloso – 2006/2007
- (Portugal) William Carvalho – 2013/2014
- (Portugal) Pedro Gonçalves – 2020/2021
- (Portugal) Geovany Quenda – 2024/2025

LPFP Primeira Liga Player of the Year:

- (Portugal) Bruno Fernandes – 2017/2018
- (Portugal) Bruno Fernandes – 2018/2019
- (Uruguay) Sebastián Coates – 2020/2021
- (Sweden) Viktor Gyökeres – 2023/2024
- (Sweden) Viktor Gyökeres – 2024/2025

LPFP Primeira Liga Goalkeeper of the Year:

- (Portugal) Rui Patrício – 2011/2012, 2015/2016, 2017/2018
- (Spain) Antonio Adán – 2020/2021

LPFP Primeira Liga Best Goal:

- (Cape Verde) Jovane Cabral – 2018/2019
- (Portugal) Nuno Santos – 2022/2023

LPFP Segunda Liga Breakthrough Player of the Year:

- (Portugal) Bruma – 2012/2013

FIFA World Cup All-Star Team

- (Bulgaria) Krasimir Balakov – 1994
- (Portugal) Ricardo – 2006
- (Argentina) Marcos Rojo – 2014

The 100 Greatest Players of the 20th Century

- (Denmark) Peter Schmeichel
- (Portugal) Paulo Futre

=== Historical Records ===
==== Most Club Appearances ====
- Hilário – 474

==== Most Club Goals Scored ====
- Fernando Peyroteo – 540

==== Club's Best Goals Per Game Ratio ====
- Fernando Peyroteo – 1.6

==== Club's Youngest Footballer to Play in a Primeira Liga Game ====
- Dário Essugo – 16 years and 6 days

==== Youngest Portuguese Footballer to Play in a UEFA Club Competitions Game ====
- Dário Essugo – 16 years and 268 days

==== Youngest Footballer to Score on Club's Debut ====
- Geovany Quenda – 17 years, 3 months and 5 days

==== Youngest Footballer to Score in a Primeira Liga Game for the Club ====
- Geovany Quenda – 17 years, 5 months and 27 days

==== Youngest Player to Debut for the Portuguese National Football Team ====
- Paulo Futre – 17 years old, 7 months and 21 days

==== Oldest Footballer to Played in an Official Game for the Club ====
- Vítor Damas – 41 years and 50 days

==== Highest Player Transfer Fee Received ====
- Viktor Gyökeres – 69,76M€, potentially 76M€

==== Highest Player Transfer Fee Paid ====
- Rodrigo Zalazar – 30M€

==== Highest-scoring midfielder in Europe ====
- Bruno Fernandes - 32 goals (2018/2019)

== Former coaches ==
For details on former coaches, see List of Sporting CP managers.

Head coaches who won Primeira Liga for Sporting CP:

- (Hungary) Josef Szabo in 1940/1941 and 1943/1944
- (England) Robert Kelly in 1946/1947
- (Portugal) Cândido de Oliveira in 1947/1948 and 1948/1949
- (England) Randolph Galloway in 1950/1951, 1951/1952 and 1952/1953
- (Portugal) Tavares da Silva in 1953/1954
- (Uruguay) Enrique Fernandez in 1957/1958
- (Brazil) Otto Glória in 1961/1962 and 1965/1966
- (Portugal) Fernando Vaz in 1969/1970
- (Portugal) Mário Lino in 1973/1974
- (Portugal) Fernando Mendes in 1979/1980
- (England) Malcolm Allison in 1981/1982
- (Portugal) Augusto Inácio in 1999/2000
- (Romania) László Bölöni in 2001/2002
- (Portugal) Ruben Amorim in 2020/2021, 2023/2024 and 2024/2025
- (Portugal) Rui Borges in 2024/2025

=== Head coaches who won UEFA club competitions for Sporting CP ===
- (Portugal) Anselmo Fernandez – 1963/1964 European Cup Winners' Cup

=== Award winners while coaching Sporting CP ===
LPFP Best Coach

- (Portugal) Rúben Amorim – 2020/2021, 2023/2024
- (Portugal) Rui Borges – 2024/2025

LPFP Breakthrough Coach

- (Portugal) Paulo Bento – 2005/2006

== Media ==
=== Newspaper ===
Jornal Sporting is a weekly newspaper published by Sporting. Beginning its activity as Sporting Club of Portugal Bulletin on 31 March 1922, it was initially an eight-page calendar, with the optional payment of $2 a semester. Under the direction of Artur da Cunha Rosa, the bulletin became known as a newspaper in June 1952.

=== Sporting TV ===
Sporting TV is the television channel of Sporting Clube de Portugal. An open channel available on satellite and cable television and online, it is offered by telecommunications companies MEO, NOS, Vodafone and Nowo in Portugal, and also in other countries like Angola and Mozambique, where it is broadcast by operator ZAP. The channel broadcasts content linked to Sporting CP's universe ranging from documentaries, interviews, talk shows, news and post-match analysis and commentary programs, to live and recorded Sporting CP's ball sport matches and coverage of all the other competitions and sporting events involving the multi-sports club.

== Museum ==
Inaugurated on 31 August 2004 in Lisbon, the Sporting Museum (Museu Sporting) is divided into several thematic areas that express the wealth of the club's heritage and its sporting achievements over more than a century of existence in thirty-two different modalities. About two thousand trophies are on display, and there are many others in store.

The history of the museum dates back to the trophy room of the old headquarters on Rua do Passadiço, where in 1956, 1850 trophies were already stored. In 1994, President Sousa Cintra inaugurated a new trophy room, where less than half of the club's collections were exhibited. The following year the remodeling and organization of the museum is promoted, and a conservative viewpoint is incorporated. During the construction of the new Estádio José Alvalade a new museum is inaugurated, culminating in four years of investigation. Throughout the years, through donations with several origins, in addition to the trophies the patrimony of the club never stopped growing. In July 2016, there was a new inauguration after a total renovation.

Outside of Lisbon, there is also an official Sporting Museum in the city of Leiria, in the Central Region of Portugal.

== Foundation ==
Sporting CP had already developed social solidarity initiatives throughout its history, but in 2006 it created a section called Sporting Solidário, which until the creation of the Sporting Foundation developed a series of social solidarity actions. Established in 2012, the Fundação Sporting (Sporting Foundation), is a humanitarian charity foundation devoted to helping people in need, including children at risk, the homeless and war victims. In-kind donations are collected by the Sporting Foundation on match days and the proceeds from the sale of tickets of some selected matches at Estádio José Alvalade go to the Sporting Foundation to finance the foundation's charity work.

== Club officials ==
As of 26 June 2021

=== Directive Board ===
- President: Frederico Varandas
- Vice-presidents: Carlos Vieira, Vicente Moura, Vítor Silva Ferreira, António Rebelo
- Board members: Bruno Mascarenhas Garcia, Luís Roque, Rui Caeiro, Alexandre Henriques, José Quintela
- Substitutes: Rita Matos, Luís Gestas, Jorge Sanches, Luís Loureiro

=== General Assembly ===
- President: Rogério Alves
- Vice-president: Rui Solheiro
- Secretaries: Miguel de Castro, Luís Pereira, Tiago Abade
- Substitutes: Diogo Orvalho, Manuel Mendes, Rui Fernandes
