= Sociedade Anónima Desportiva =

Type of business entity in Portugal

Sociedade Anónima Desportiva ("Public limited sports company") is a special type of public limited company (SA) in Portugal. The new legal status was introduced in the 1990s to improve financial management and transparency in sports clubs. Many Portuguese football and basketball clubs, or teams within a multi-sport club, add the suffix SAD to the end of their official name.

== Formation and characteristics ==
The legal structure of a Sociedade Anónima Desportiva allows for the formation of a public limited company whose corporate purpose is to participate in professional sports competitions, promote and organize sporting events, and foster or develop activities related to the professional practice of a given sport.

A Sociedade Anónima Desportiva has the following characteristics:

- it can be formed through the transformation of a sports club that participates or intends to participate in professional sports competitions. It can also be established by giving legal personality to a team that participates or intends to participate in professional sports, or by being created from scratch, independent of any existing club or team;
- a sports club that has opted to form a Sociedade Anónima Desportiva or give legal personality to its professional team cannot return to participating in professional sports competitions except under this new legal status;
- the minimum share capital is €997,595.79 for sports companies participating in the 1st division, €498,797.90 for those in the 2nd division of honor, and €249,398.95 for companies formed to participate in professional basketball competitions and for those outside the scope of professional competitions (as an exception);
- the company's name and designation must necessarily include the specific sport and conclude with the abbreviation SAD. If the company is formed from the transformation of a sports club or from giving legal personality to a team, its name must also include a reference linking it to the founding club;
- these companies are governed subsidiarily by the regulations that apply to public limited companies.

== See also ==
- List of football clubs in Portugal
- Sociedad Anónima Deportiva
- Sociedade Anônima do Futebol
