= Lapa, Lisbon =

Neighborhood and former civil parish in Lisbon, Portugal

Lapa
- Civil parish
- Tram 25 on Rua de São Domingos à Lapa

- Location in Portugal
- Coordinates: 38.7098°N 9.16073°W
- Country: Portugal
- Region: Lisbon
- Metropolitan area: Lisbon
- District: Lisbon
- Municipality: Lisbon
- Parish created: 1770
- Disbanded: 2012

Population (2011)
  - Total: 8,000
- Time zone: UTC+00:00 (WET)
  - Summer (DST): UTC+01:00 (WEST)

Lapa is a neighborhood (bairro) and former civil parish (freguesia) in Lisbon, Portugal, on a hillside above the Tagus west of the city center. It grew up in the months after the 1755 Lisbon earthquake, when a convent of nuns divided its farmland into streets and building plots and carried on despite a royal ban, and it became a parish in 1770. The neighborhood later attracted the nobility, commerce and foreign residents, and from the 19th century it became one of the favored districts for aristocratic residences in Lisbon. It contains the São Bento Palace, seat of the Assembly of the Republic, and is known as one of Lisbon's two embassy districts. In 2025 Portugal's public broadcaster described it as "today one of the capital's most expensive areas". The parish was abolished in Lisbon's 2012 administrative reorganization, and its territory became part of the parish of Estrela.

== Name ==
A lapa is a cavity or shelter in rock. According to the Lisbon historian Norberto de Araújo, as quoted by Lisbon City Council's toponymy office, in the 16th century the area was fields with scattered houses and stone quarries, and a lapa in one of the rocks gave rise to the place name "Lapa da Moura". The parish took its dedication from Nossa Senhora da Lapa, a devotion to the Virgin Mary. A chapel on the site was dedicated on 21 December 1755, weeks after the earthquake, with an image of Our Lady of Lapa, and a study published by Lisbon's municipal archive records that an image of the Virgin that had survived the earthquake was the origin of the Recolhimento da Lapa, a religious retreat house.

== History ==
=== Origins after the earthquake ===
Before 1755 much of the area was farmland. Part of it belonged to the convent of the Trinitarian nuns, known as the Trinas, whose land consisted of two adjoining farms, Boa Vista and Buenos Aires, on a steep hillside covering about 14 hectares. After the earthquake left much of Lisbon's population homeless, the nuns divided their land into plots and let them to working people to build houses, in defiance of the Marquis of Pombal's reconstruction plans. On 2 February 1756 they gave a power of attorney to Friar Caetano de Santa Inês to lay out streets and divide into plots "their lands next to their convent called Boa Vista and Buenos Aires".

On 16 September 1756 King Joseph I ordered that the nuns' plan for their land not be carried out, in an attempt to halt a housing development under construction without royal approval. Leasing and building continued regardless, mainly because the city's procurator, António Pereira Viveiros, refused to enforce the royal decision, and on 12 May 1758 the king lifted the ban by an alvará with the force of law. The streets were laid out about 11 metres (36 ft) wide and oriented toward the river, a design the municipal archive's study identifies as the defining feature of the neighborhood's plan. In 2025 the Museum of Lisbon's exhibition Crónicas de uma Lisboa Desconhecida (Chronicles of an Unknown Lisbon), at the Pimenta Palace, presented Lapa as "Lisbon's first clandestine neighborhood".

=== Parish and aristocratic quarter ===
Lapa became a parish in 1770; its parish registers, held by the National Archive of Torre do Tombo, run from 1770 to 1911. It was created on 11 February 1770 by the Cardinal Patriarch of Lisbon, Francisco de Saldanha da Gama. According to the Recolhimento da Lapa, its chapel of Nossa Senhora da Lapa on Rua da Lapa served as the parish church from 1770 until 1886, when the parish "passed to the Estrela"; the Estrela Basilica is listed in the national heritage inventory under the alternative designation "Parish Church of Lapa".

Although the nuns had deliberately leased their plots to working people, the neighborhood's population became more prosperous over time. To the west of the Trinas' development grew what the municipal archive's study calls "aristocratic Lapa", where palaces and mansions (palacetes) stood on large plots. Norberto de Araújo described "two Lapas: the popular and the aristocratic", the latter a prosperous quarter that drew the English, commerce, the bourgeoisie and nobility leaving the eastern part of the city. In the 19th century Lapa was one of the districts favored for noble residences in Lisbon, alongside São Francisco, Rato and the Passeio Público. In 1833 Britain's minister to Portugal, Lord Howard de Walden, leased a house in Lapa for the British mission. In the Bairro das Trinas the 1930s marked a turning point, when reinforced-concrete apartment buildings were first built systematically.

In 2018 the historian Mónica Queiroz, leading a guided walk organized by Lisbon City Council, described the neighborhood as "simultaneously working-class and aristocratic" (simultaneamente popular e aristocrata). The parish was abolished by Law No. 56/2012 of 8 November 2012, and Lapa was merged with the parishes of Prazeres and Santos-o-Velho to form the new parish of Estrela.

== Landmarks ==
=== São Bento Palace ===
The former Benedictine monastery of São Bento da Saúde, in Lapa, houses the Assembly of the Republic. Construction of the monastery began in 1598 to a design by the royal architect Baltasar Álvares, continued by the monks Pedro Quaresma and João Turriano. After the dissolution of the religious orders, a royal decree of Pedro IV assigned the building to Parliament, and the chambers opened in August 1834. The palace was remodeled by Ventura Terra at the end of the 19th century, and its monumental staircase was added from 1936. It is classified as a National Monument, together with the garden adjoining the prime minister's residence. The Palacete de São Bento, built in 1877, was acquired by the state in 1937 as the official residence of the head of government, its closeness to Parliament being a factor in the choice.

=== Estrela Basilica ===
The Estrela Basilica, whose alternative designations in Portugal's national heritage inventory include "Parish Church of Lapa" (Igreja Paroquial da Lapa), originated in a vow made by the future Queen Maria I on her wedding day in 1760. Construction began in 1779 to a design by Mateus Vicente de Oliveira, continued after his death in 1786 by Reinaldo Manuel dos Santos, and the basilica was consecrated on 15 November 1789. It is classified as a National Monument under decrees of 1907 and 1910.

=== Mansions ===
Several of Lapa's mansions are protected heritage buildings. The Palacete dos Viscondes e Condes dos Olivais e Penha-Longa, also known as the Palacete da Lapa, was built in the second half of the 19th century by the 1st Count of Olivais. It became the German embassy in 1926 and housed the embassy of the United States from the 1950s until 1983, and it was classified as a Property of Public Interest in 1996. The Casa Visconde de Sacavém on Rua do Sacramento à Lapa, commissioned in 1897 and decorated in 1900 with ceramics influenced by the school of Rafael Bordalo Pinheiro, was classified as a Monument of Municipal Interest in 2016. A manor house built in Lapa in 1870 by the Viscount of Porto Covo, later owned by the Count of Valenças, remained a family home until 1988 and is now the Olissippo Lapa Palace hotel.

== Diplomatic presence ==
Lapa and Restelo are described as Lisbon's two embassy neighborhoods, and Time Out Lisboa has described Lapa as largely a mix of "embassies, children's schools and steep streets". Estrela, the parish that absorbed Lapa, has more embassies than any other parish in Lisbon. Several of Lapa's aristocratic houses have served as diplomatic premises, including the British minister's house leased in 1833 and the Palacete da Lapa, occupied successively by the German and American embassies.

== Notable residents ==
- Raul Brandão (1867–1930), writer, died in Lapa, at Rua de São Domingos à Lapa; the parish council placed a commemorative plaque there in 2019.
- António Sérgio (1883–1969), essayist and educator, lived from 1926 until his death in a house on Travessa do Moinho de Vento in Lapa designed for him by the architect Raul Lino.
- David Mourão-Ferreira (1927–1996), poet and writer, was born in Lapa and lived there until the age of 15.
- Francisco Pinto Balsemão (1937–2025), prime minister and founder of the newspaper Expresso, grew up in Lapa, near the São Caetano à Lapa headquarters of the Social Democratic Party that he later led.

== Demographics ==
At the 2011 census, the last held while it was a parish, Lapa had 8,000 residents, 3,553 men and 4,447 women. Its population had been 10,656 in 1991 and 8,670 in 2001, a fall of 18.6% over that decade.

== Property ==
In 2025 Lapa was described by the public broadcaster RTP as one of the most expensive areas of the capital. In rankings compiled by the property portal Idealista and reported in the Portuguese press, Rua de Buenos Aires, a street on the city council's guided route through Lapa, was among the ten most expensive streets in Portugal in 2023, with an average home price of €2.67 million, and ranked sixth in 2024, with luxury homes averaging about €3.17 million.

== Transport ==
The neighborhood is served by tram line 25, which stops at Rua de São Domingos à Lapa, Rua de Santana à Lapa and Rua de Buenos Aires.
