= Holtreman =

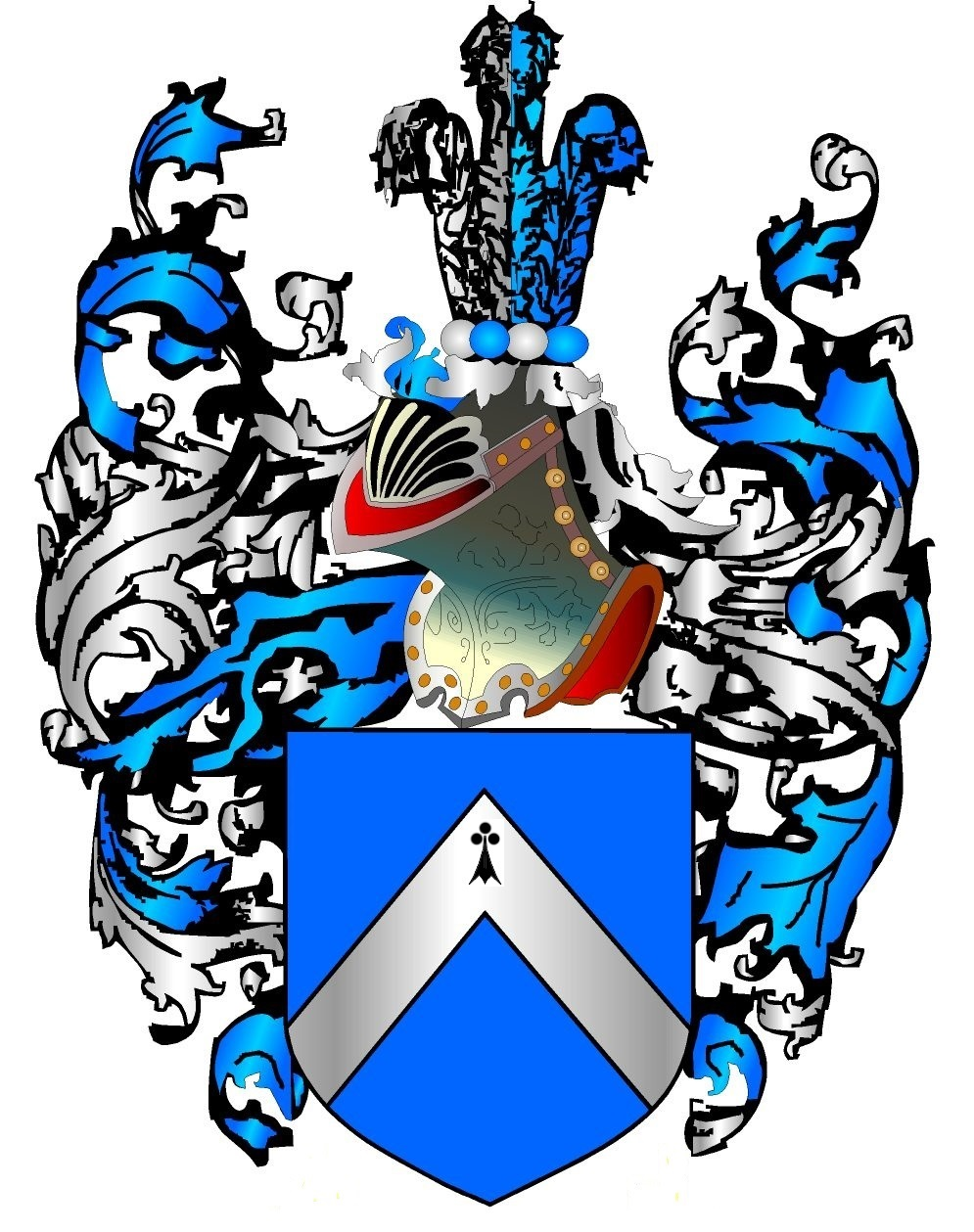
Ho(u)ltreman/Oultreman: "d'azur au chevron d'hermine" in: Pitpan de Montauban. Manuscrits.

Coat of Arms of Ostend: from the coat of arms of Woutreman I Van Ghent governor of Ostend

Holtreman is a spelling version of the Oultreman family name. The Holtreman name was adopted in Portugal by an Oultreman's family branch originally from Valenciennes. In the early 17th century, a knight called Jean (John) Houltremant (or d’Oultreman) served the Count of Vila Real in the reign of Philip III of Portugal (Philip IV of Spain). Jean Houltremant descended from an old lineage from the County of Flanders and the County of Hainaut being a grandson of Jacques d’Oultreman dit Houltreman, adviser of his majesty at Namur. Jean married Ana Antónia Nunes, daughter of Manuel Nunes and wife Ana Nunes, landowners of the Anadia region in Portugal.

After the Portuguese Restoration War, Jean descendency is believed to have adopted his wife's family name of Nunes, and moved to Pousaflores, in Ansião, into his wife's family lands. The Holtremant name was later recovered in the 18th century by Bartolomeu Nunes Holtremant, Knight of the Order of Christ and by his cousin - and godson - Manuel Ribeiro Holtremant, Knight of the Order of Saint James. Due to Portuguese pronunciation, all their descendants have adopted the Holtreman spelling. In Portugal, the family is better known because of the foundation of Sporting Clube de Portugal (often erroneously known as "Sporting Lisbon").

The d'Oultreman family obtained several recognition of nobility from both the Habsburgs's Austrian and Spanish branches, and from Charles I of Portugal. In the County of Flanders and the County of Hainaut, both Flemish and French were spoken across both counties, explaining why the name suffered minor spelling changes depending on where the family member lived or was born. The most commons are Oultreman (or Houltreman) and Oultremant (or Houltremant).

The family descends from the Knight known as the Oultreman of Ghent (or Woutreman van Ghent, in Dutch) – the family origins in Ghent are well documented. Born Woutre van Ghent (1214–1261), he was the youngest son of Zeger II, Viscount de Gand (himself grandson of William of Ypres, legitimated son of Phillip of Ypres and his concubine, madam of Loo) and Petronella of Coutrai. As governor of Ostend he adapted the suffix "MAN" in 1229 being styled Woutreman I Van Ghent (or Watreman de Gand, in French)

== Oultreman (or Houltreman) ==
The first mention to the Oultreman name is Jean d’Oultreman, son of Guilleme dit Woutreman. Jean was born around 1420, married Barbe Van der Walle and his descendency settled in Valenciennes where they become Lords of Rombies, of Jollain, of de la Marlier, and du Chastelet, etc.

Several member of this family held prominent positions, namely:

- Antoine d'Oultreman - Historian of the Abbey of Saint Jean
- Henri d'Oultreman – Mayor of Valenciennes, Lord of Rombies, and Author of "Histoire de la ville et comté de Valenciennes"
- Jacques d'Outreman - Prominent Antiquarian of Valenciennes
- Philippe d'Oultreman - Jesuit and Religious Historian
- Jean-François d'Oultreman - Knight, Lord of de Chastelet, Hamal, etc.
- Charlotte d'Oultreman de Tornielly - Marchioness of Surco
- Fernando Cayetano Suarez de Figueroa y Tornielly Mena Carranza d'Oultreman - Knight of the Order of Calatrava
- Jean d'Oultreman - Knight of the Order of the Holy Sepulchre of Jerusalem, Lord of de la Marlière et du Chastelet, Mayor of Valenciennes

== Holtreman in Portugal ==
Although the family is better known in Portugal for the foundation of the soccer club Sporting Clube de Portugal, among their descendants in Portugal one can find:

- Alfredo Augusto das Neves Holtreman – founder of Sporting Clube de Portugal
- António Maria Holtreman do Rego Botelho de Faria, Count of Rego Botelho
- António Luís (Holtreman)-Roquette Ricciardi – Patriarch and head of the Espirito Santo family
- Bartolomeu Nunes Holtreman - Knight of the Order of Christ
- Carlos Augusto Holtreman Franco - Guilhermina Suggia prize in 1966, co-founder of the "Grupo de Música Contemporânea de Lisboa"
- João Maria Holtreman do Rego - Co-founder of the Portuguese Chemical Society
- João Lopes Holtreman - founder of the Portuguese Antiquarian Booksellers Association
- José Alfredo Holtreman-Roquette (José Alvalade) - founder of Sporting Clube de Portugal
- José Alfredo Parreira Holtreman-Roquette - well known businessman and former President of Sporting Clube de Portugal
- José Carlos Xavier Holtreman - Artist, Actor, and Writer
- Hugo (Holtreman-Roquette) Ricciardi O'Neill, the current head of the Clanaboy O'Neill dynasty - the senior branch of the High Kings of Ireland
- Victor de Oliveira Holtreman - Owner and CEO of GameRant.com, a popular video game news website that is visited over 5 million times a month

Nowadays, there are mainly two family branches holding the Holtreman name in Portugal: The Holtreman-Roquette branch, being the senior male representative José Alfredo Parreira Holtreman Roquette, and the Holtreman branch, being the senior male representative Victor de Oliveira Holtreman, born and living in the United States of America without male descendants. In Portugal, the eldest male representative of the latter branch is Carlos (Charles) Pereira Holtreman, Victor's cousin.
