= Museum of Lisbon =

- Museu de Lisboa
- Established: 1942; 84 years ago
- Location: Lisbon, Portugal
- Coordinates: 38°45′30″N 9°09′24″W
- Type: City Museum
- Director: Joana Sousa Monteiro
- Website: Official website

The Museum of Lisbon is a museum network in Lisbon, Portugal, dedicated to the history of Lisbon, from prehistoric times to the modern day. The museum is housed in various buildings across Lisbon, including Pimenta Palace in Campo Grande, the Praça do Comércio in the Lisbon Baixa, and the Casa dos Bicos in Alfama, among others.

== History ==
Pimenta Palace in Campo Grande.

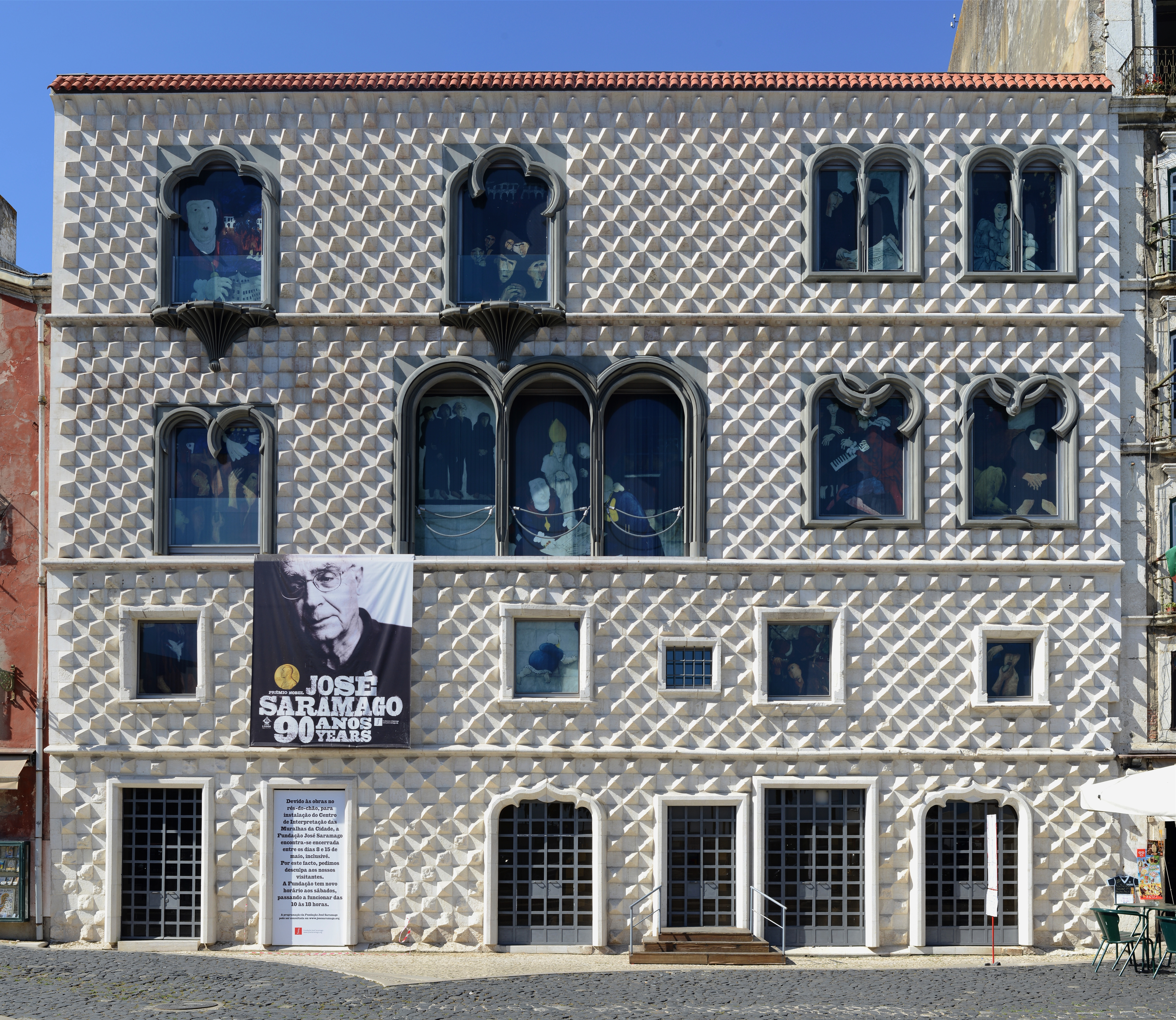
Casa dos Bicos in Alfama.

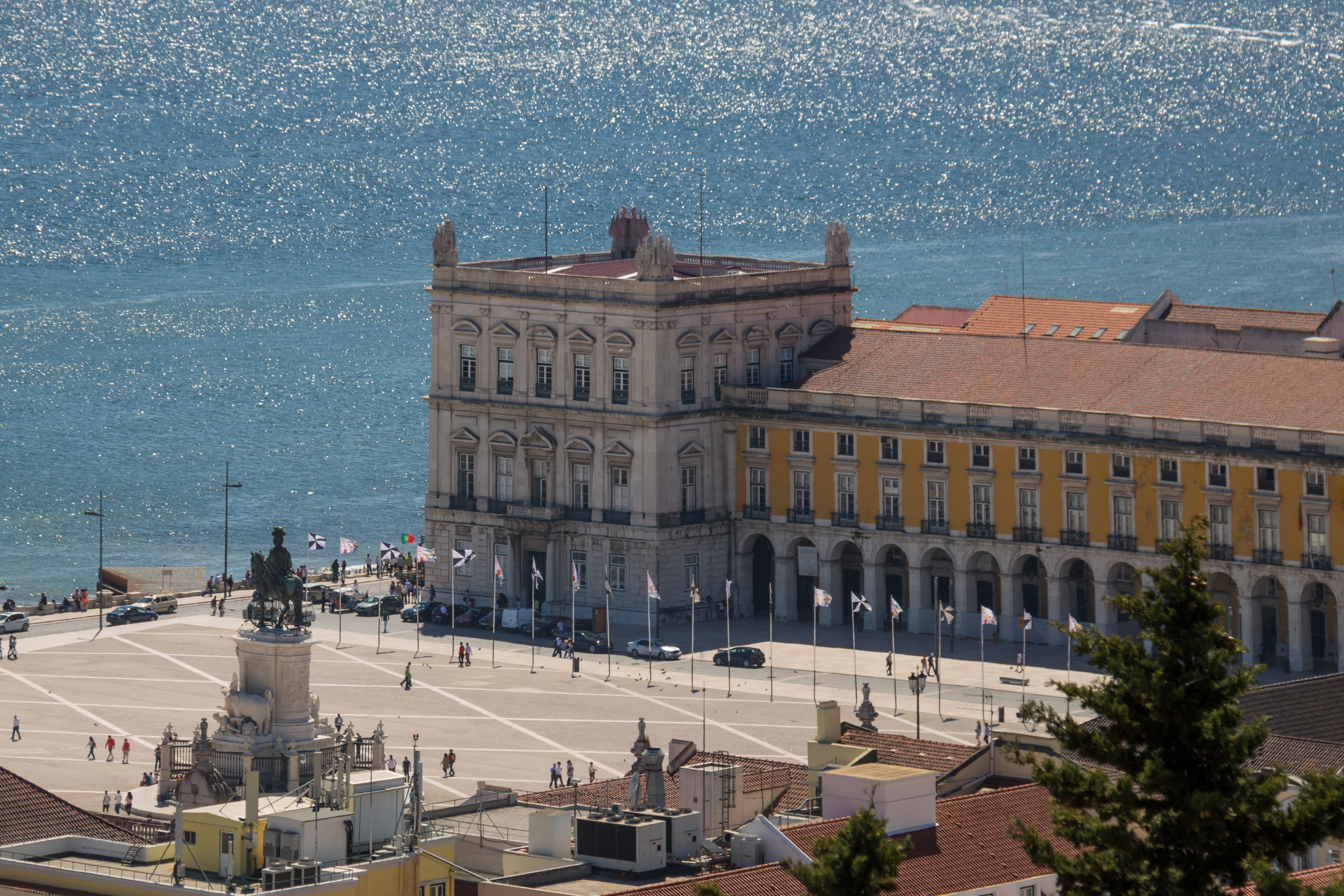
The western tower of the Praça do Comércio houses the Museu de Lisboa's location in the Lisbon Baixa.

The creation of a municipal museum for Lisbon was first proposed in 1909, by the republican members of the Lisbon Senate, then dominated by monarchists, but no action was taken.

In 1930, the city purchased the Palácio da Mitra, a former residence of the Patriarch of Lisbon, in order to outfit the palace to house a city museum. Following renovations to the palace, the Museu da Cidade (City Museum) opened in 1942, under the leadership of curator Mário Tavares Chicó.

In 1962, the museum purchased Pimenta Palace to serve as its home, because of its more central location and larger facilities. However, the museum only inaugurated the new facilities at Pimenta Palace in 1979, after more than a decade of renovations.

In 2009, a new museological direction for the museum was formulated, along with a new public image plan, which resulted in the transformation of the Museu da Cidade (City Museum) to the Museu de Lisboa (Museum of Lisbon), in 2015. Similarly, the new museological direction decentralized the museum and led to the creation of multiple poles of the museum across the city.

== Locations ==
The Museu de Lisboa currently has the following locations:

- Pimenta Palace (the museum's core location)
- Casa dos Bicos in Alfama
- Santo António Church in Alfama
- Praça do Comércio in the Lisbon Baixa
- Roman Theatre of Lisbon
- Roman Galleries of Rua da Prata

== Collections ==
The Museu de Lisboa has a vast collection of paintings, sculptures, maps, historical documents, and other objects d'art.

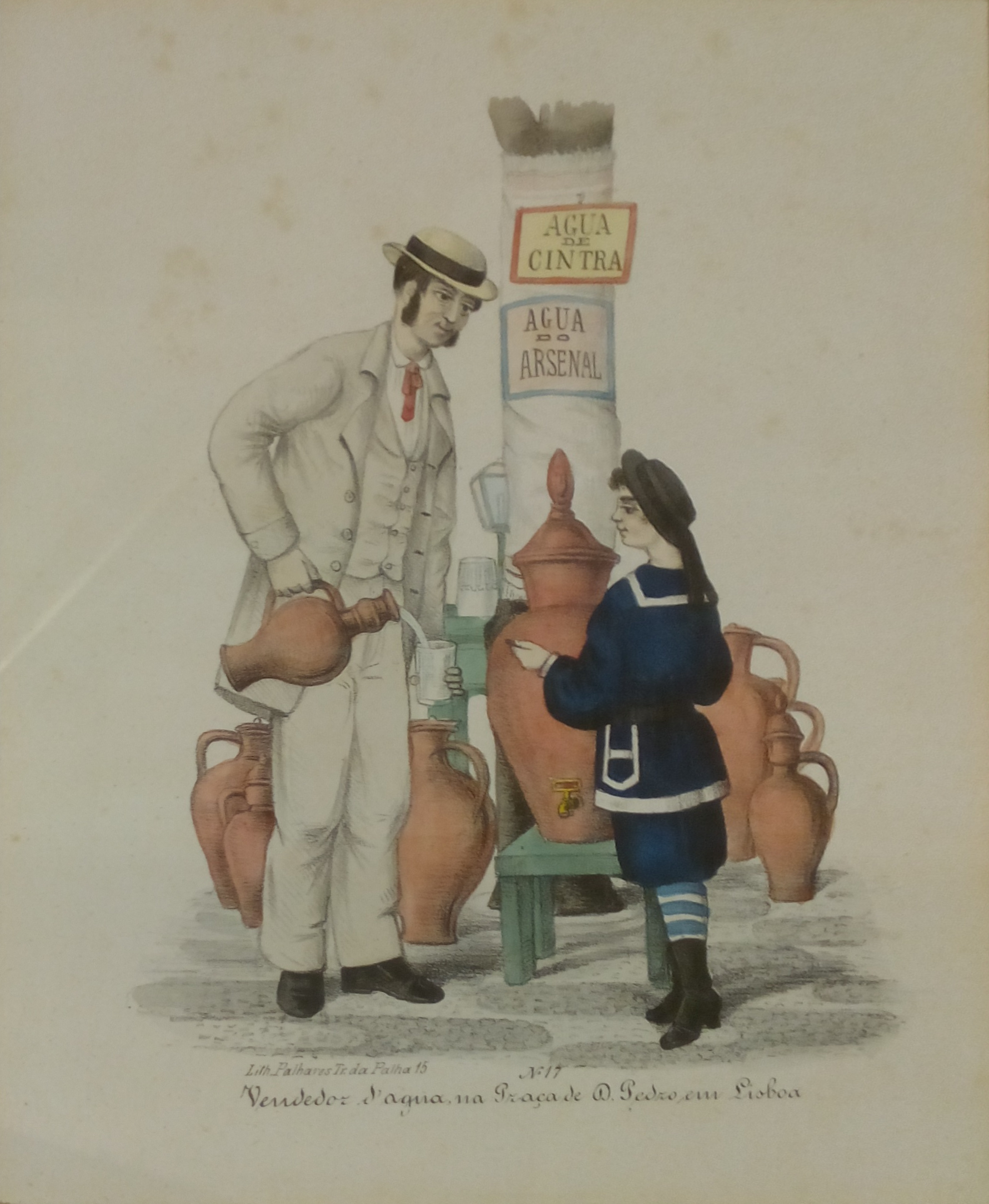
Water vendor in Rossio Square, 1877.

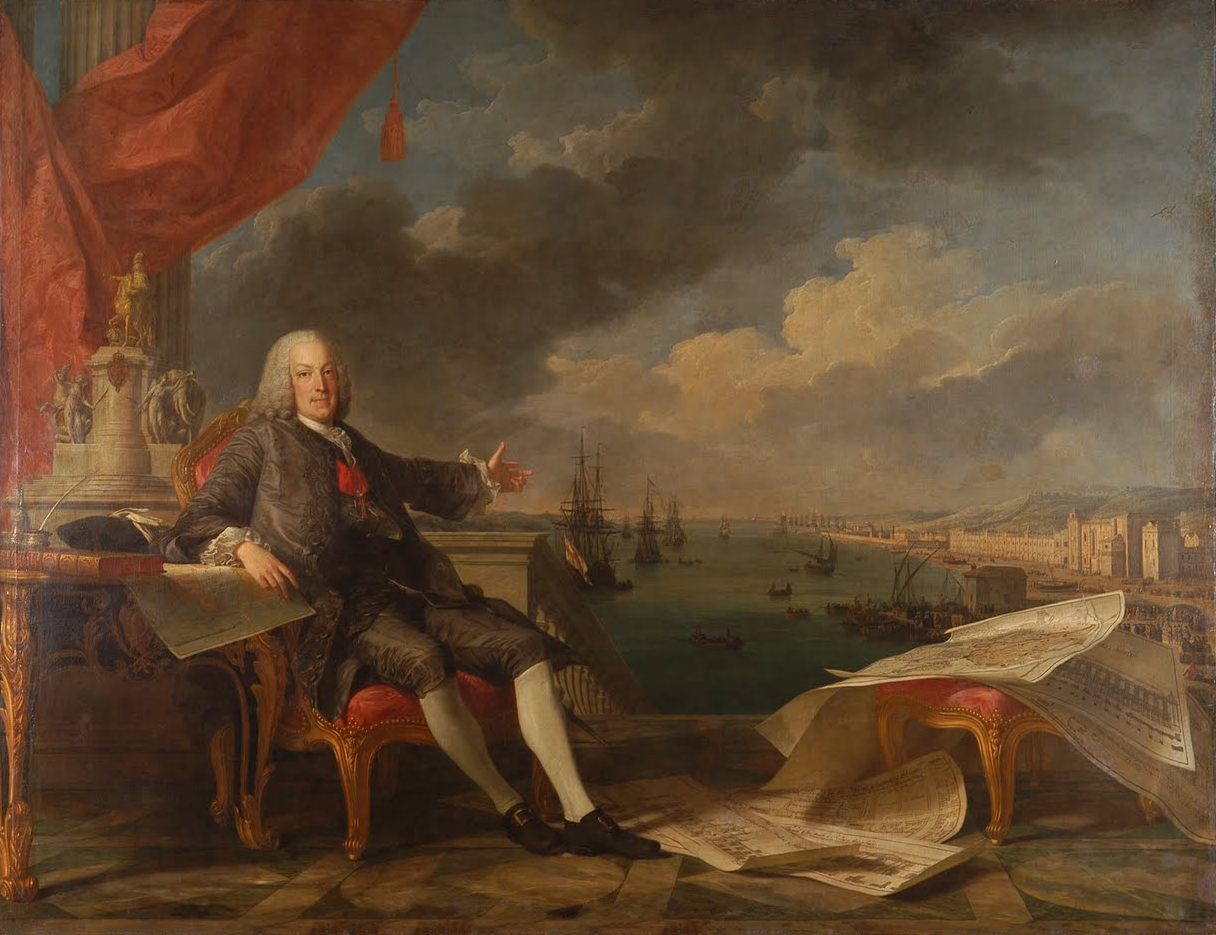
Sebastião José de Carvalho e Melo, 1st Marquis of Pombal by Louis-Michel van Loo

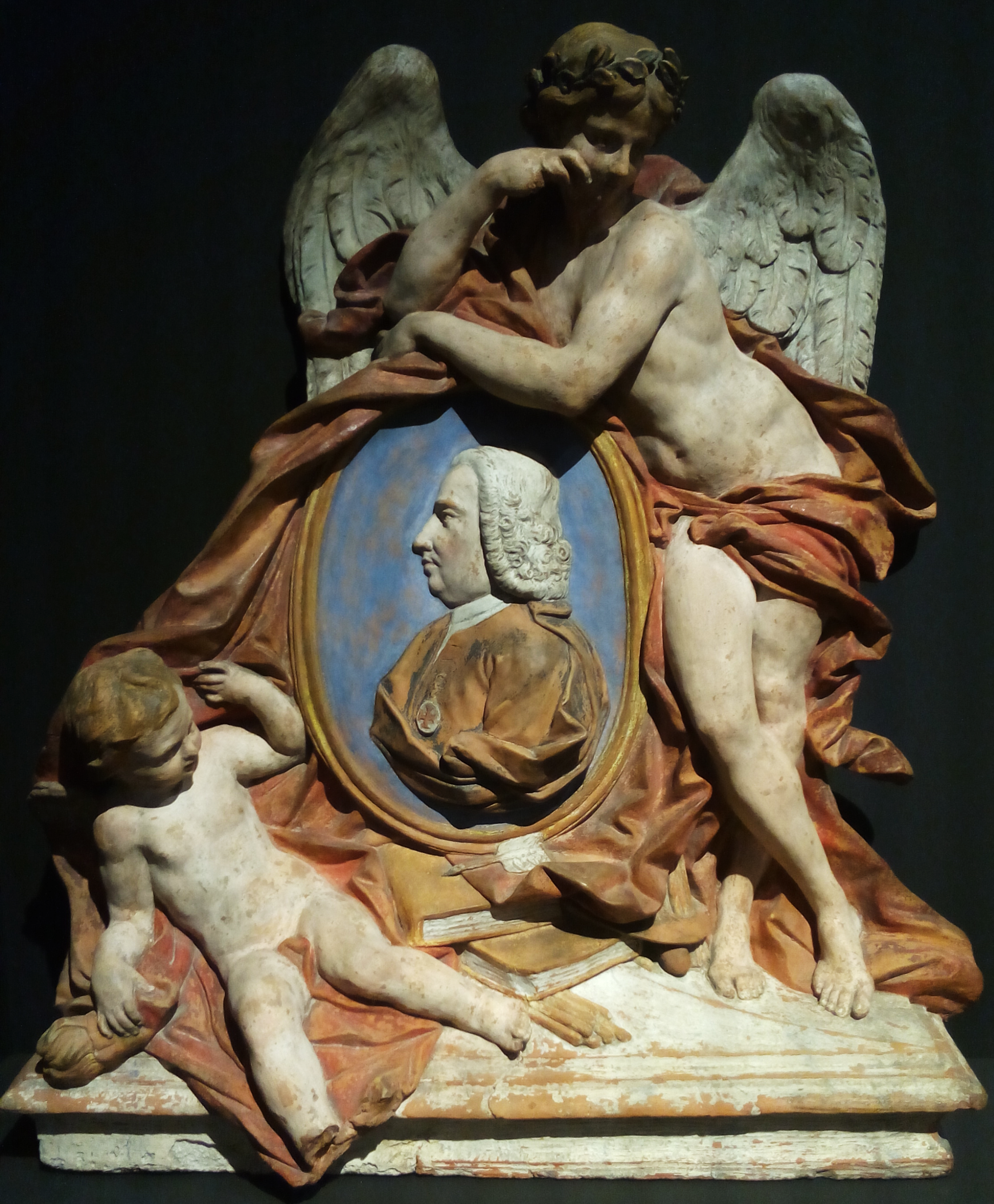
Bust of Manuel Pereira de Sampaio by Filippo della Valle

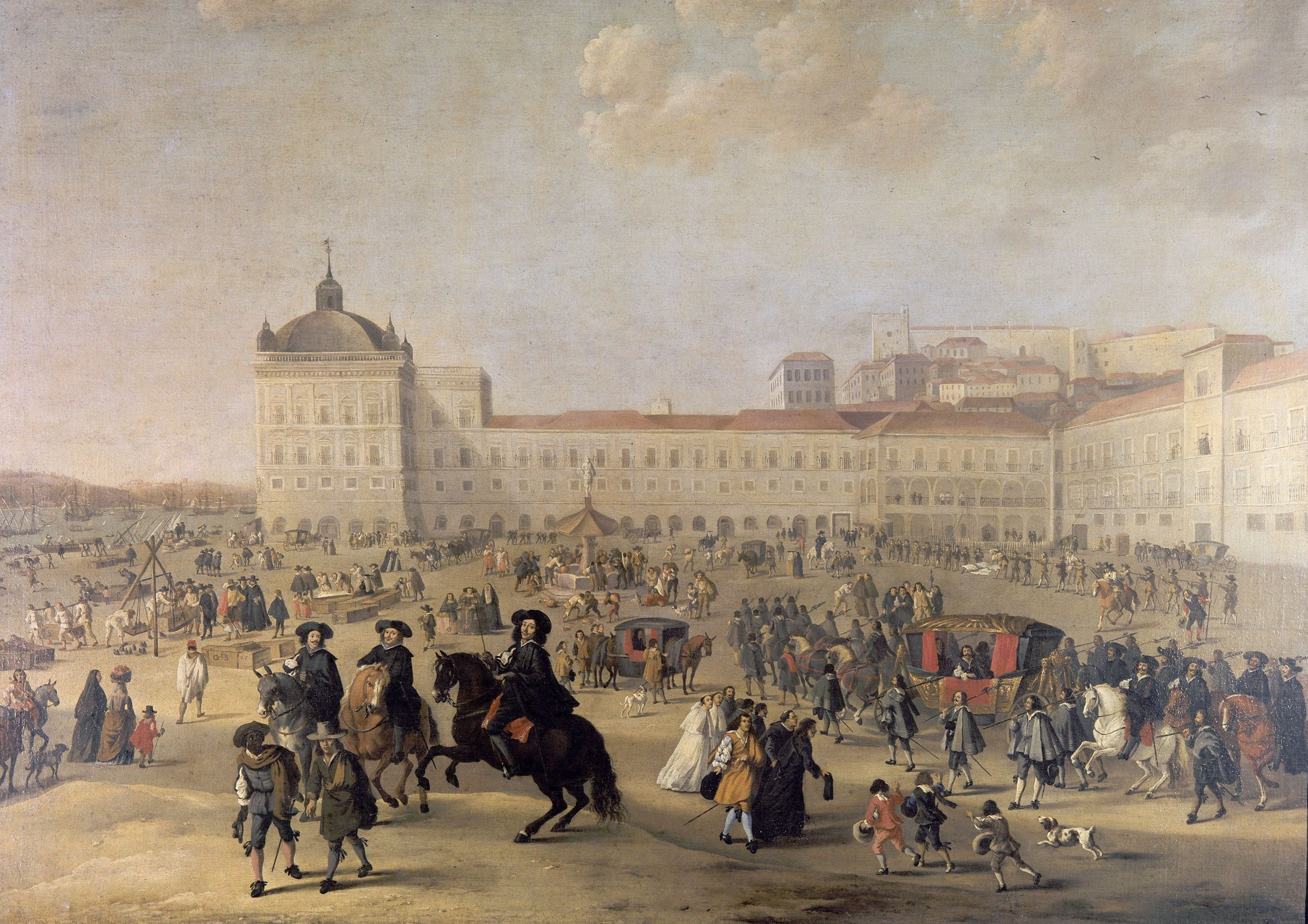
Terreiro do Paço by Dirk Stoop

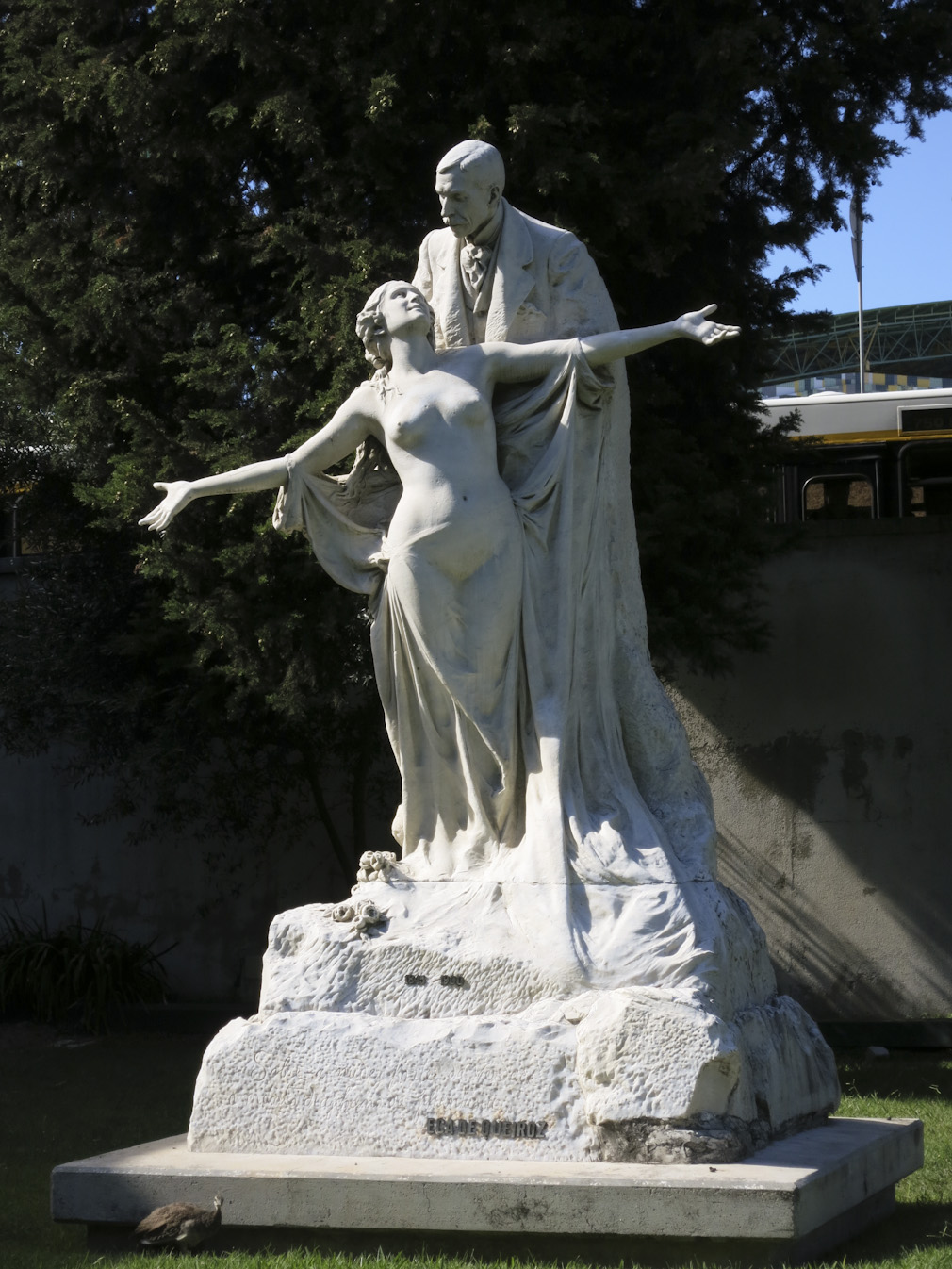
Monument to Eça de Queiroz

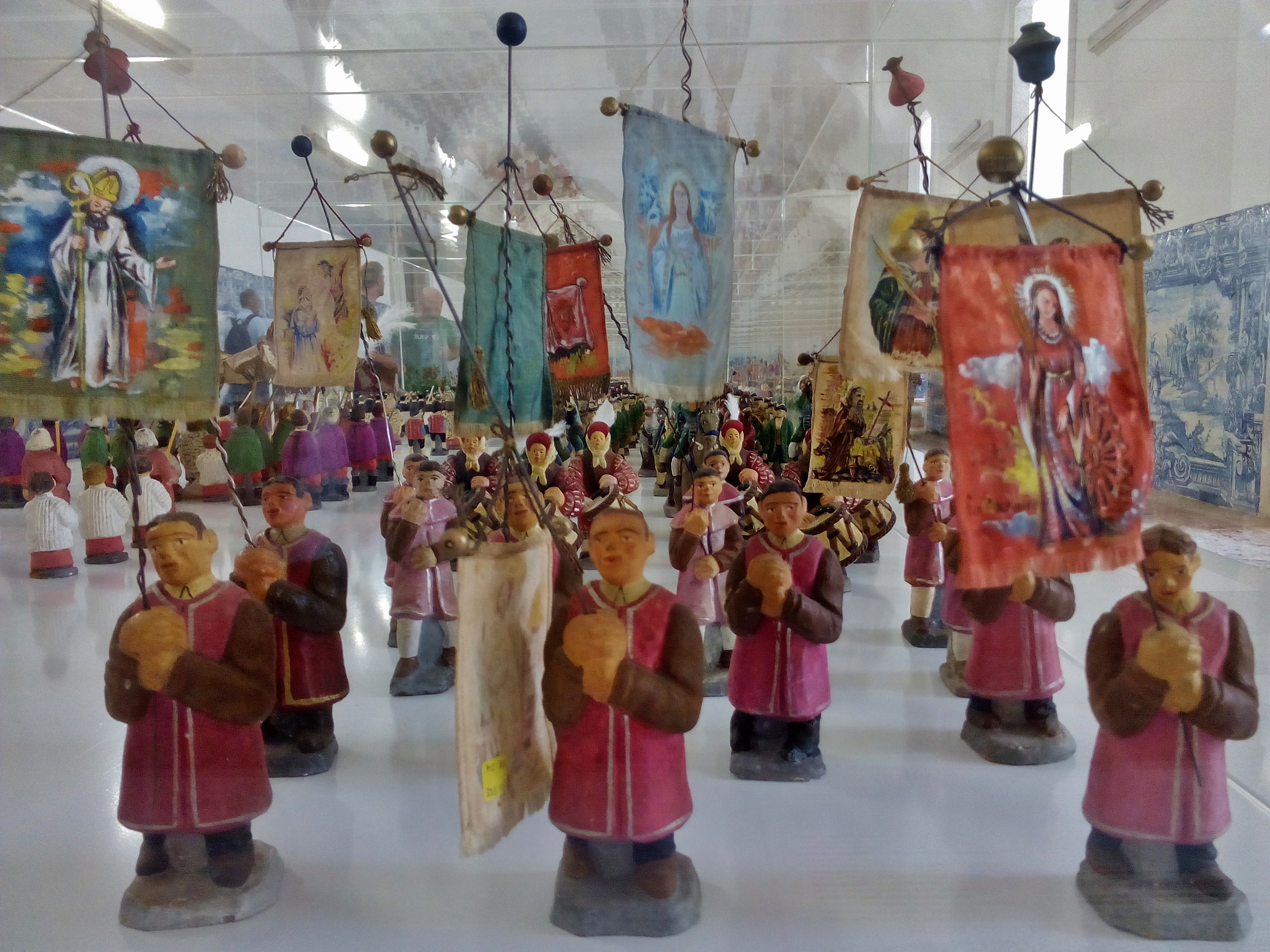
18th century Procession of the Corpus Christi figurines

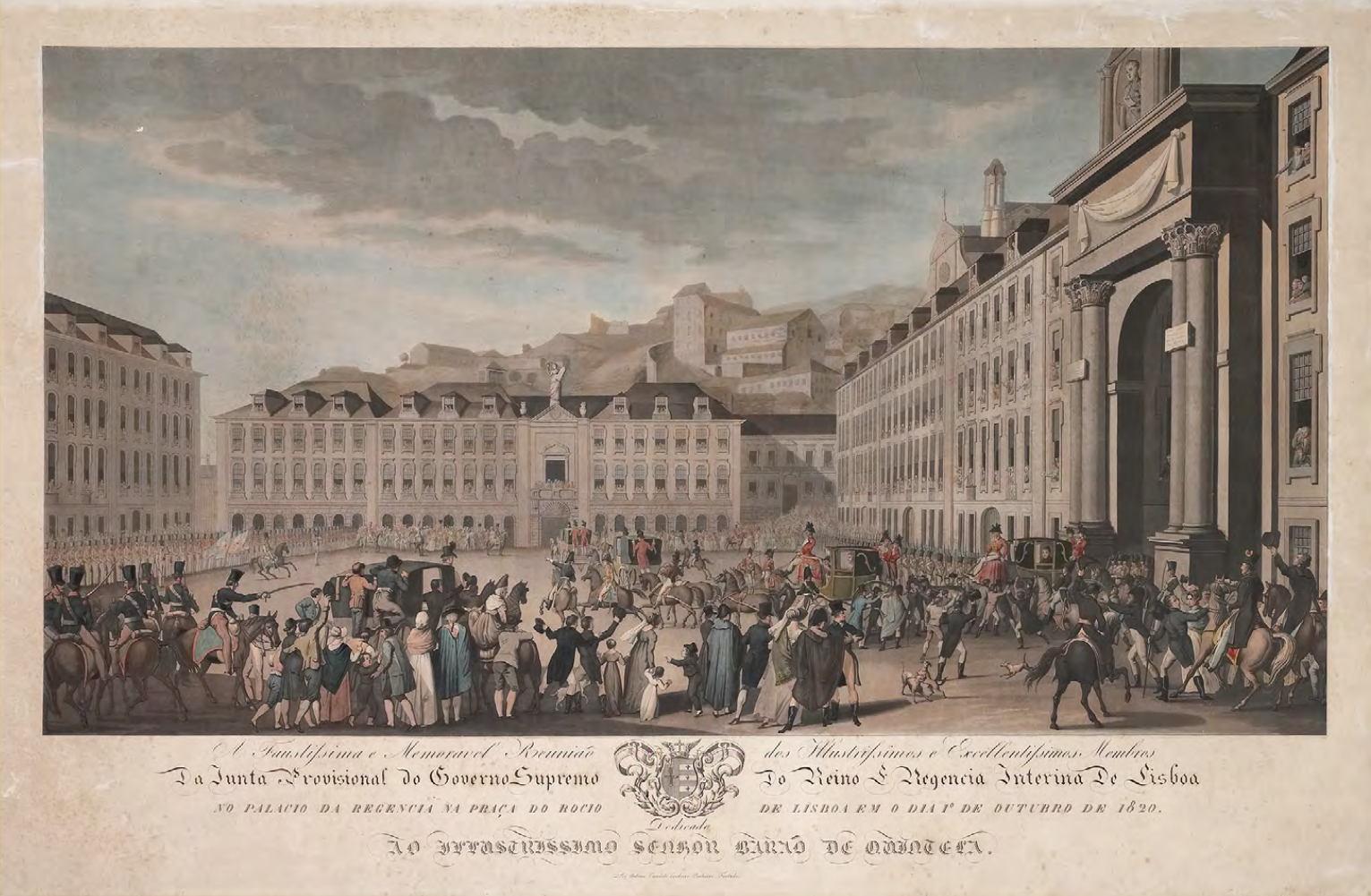
Arrival of the Regency to Lisbon by António Cândido Cordeiro Pinheiro Furtado
