= Miguel Pisco =

Portuguese football executive

Miguel Pisco is the Chairman of Grupo Desportivo Estoril Praia (Estoril-Praia), a Portuguese football club, located near Lisbon.

Pisco was the President of the General Assembly of Estoril-Praia from 1987 to 1988, later a member of the Board of Directors, and became Chairman in 1990. During his time as Chairman the club was promoted for two consecutive years, reaching the Portuguese First Division in 1991. In 1992, when the club was 5th place in the Portuguese First Division, he stepped down and was replaced as Chairman by Filipe Soares Franco, who later became the President of Sporting Clube de Portugal.

When Pisco left Estoril-Praia, the team included footballers such as Portuguese internationals Hélder Cristóvão and Paulinho, Bulgarian international Stoycho Mladenov, Moroccan international Aziz Bouderbala and Bolivian international Erwin Sanchez.

The club was relegated in 2004, but when it returned to the Portuguese First Division Pisco returned as elected Chairman with 79% of votes. He is now the President of the Fausto Figueiredo Foundation for the promotion of sport, an organization closely associated with Estoril-Praia.

From 1993 to 1995, Pisco was the President of Associacao dos Bombeiros Voluntarios dos Estoris (ABVE), the largest Association in the Cascais Municipality.
