= Carlos Góis Mota =

Carlos Cecílio Nunes Góis Mota (died 25 January 1973) was the 29th Portuguese president of Sporting CP between 28 January 1953 and 31 January 1957.

== Career ==
A Licentiate in law from the University of Lisbon and a lawyer, he became president of the Junta de Crédito Pública and Procurator General of the Republic.

He became an associate of Sporting CP in December 1934 and was part of the social bodies of the club in many mandates, fulfilling many duties for twelve consecutive years, having participated nine times in the club's direction before becoming its president, two as a vogal and seven consecutive as vice president, between 19 January 1946 and 30 January 1952. He was part of the counsel general, an organ he presided over between 1963 and 1965, and of which he was considered a member for life. He was also created an associate of merit.

Under his leadership José Travassos, one of the Five Violins (Cinco Violinos), who also played in his time and included António Jesus Correia, Fernando Peyroteo, Albano and Manuel Vasques, in 1955, was the first Portuguese soccer player to become a player for the Selection of Europe against Great Britain and Northern Ireland, in Belfast, gaining his nickname "Zé da Europa".

Sporting had to compete in lent pitches until finally Estádio José Alvalade was built and inaugurated by him on 10 June 1956 at Campo Grande, in Lisbon. This event also coincided with the Golden anniversary of the club, celebrated with a vast ensemble of activities and in a manner never seen before in the country. For the occasion was also published the book "50 Anos ao Serviço do Desporto e da Pátria" ("Fifty Years at the Service of Sport and Motherland"), which constitutes a unique document about the history of the first half a century of Sporting CP. The club's motto "Esforço, Dedicação, Devoção e Glória: Eis o Sporting" ("Effort, Dedication, Devotion and Glory: Here Is Sporting") was also adopted during his tenure, one that gave special attention to Sportig's Filiations and Delegations both in the continent, the islands and the overseas.

The club won the Portuguese Football Championship and the Cup of Portugal in 1952/1953, the Portuguese Football Championship again in 1953/1954, with which he finished a sequence of four consecutive winnings, and the Championship of Reserves in 1954/1955.

Góis Mota was also famed for once entering into the referee's cabin, at midtime, reportedly with a pistol in his hand, on 11 November 1956, at the Estádio da Tapadinha, during a game Atlético CP – Sporting. The game was tied 1-1 and apparently, he was not enjoying the arbitration of Braga Barros, referee from Leiria, and he "advised him to take better care in the 2nd part because he could get wronged".

Contrary to the popular belief, he was not a PIDE Agent. He was Member, Commander and Secretary General of the Portuguese Legion. In this position in 1961, at the outbreak of the Portuguese Colonial War, he recruited a company (called terço in the Portuguese Legion) of volunteers to protect the facilities of the Companhia Angolana de Agricultura, owned by the Espírito Santo Silva banking family in Cuanza Sul Province. It was also by the initiative that he and the Services of Information of the Portuguese Legion then headed by retired Education Inspector Parente de Figueiredo and which included journalist Luís Lupi, hired to become a special agent in Angola Fernando da Conceição Araújo, a former merchant and colonist at New Lisbon who had bankrupt, remaining his supervisor.

He is the grandfather of António Mota de Sousa Horta Osório.

== Sources ==
- https://dn.sapo.pt/especiais/interior.aspx?content_id=984212
- http://www.publico.pt/desporto/noticia/o-futebol-e-mais-instrumentalizado-hoje-do-que-foi-durante-o-estado-novo-1592434
- http://www.sporting.pt/English/Club/club_presidents.asp
- José Carlos de Ataíde de Tavares, Amarais Osórios - Senhores da Casa de Almeidinha, Edição do Autor, 1.ª Edição, Lisboa, 1986, p. 366
- Various, Anuário da Nobreza de Portugal, III, 1985, Tomo II, p. 1,054
- Various, Anuário da Nobreza de Portugal, III, 2006, Tomo III, p. 1,073
- Carlos Cecílio Góis Mota in a Portuguese Genealogical site
