= José Alvalade =

Portuguese sport club founder

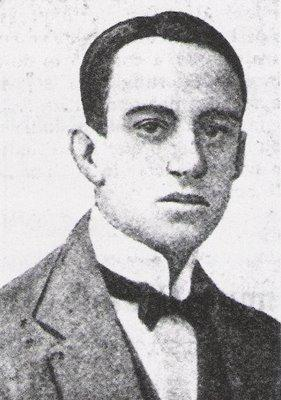

Founder of Sporting CP 3rd President of Sporting CP
- In office June 1910 – November 1912
- Preceded by: Caetano Pereira
- Succeeded by: Caetano Pereira

Personal details
- Born: José Alfredo Holtreman Roquette; 10 October 1885 Lisbon, Kingdom of Portugal
- Died: 19 October 1918 (aged 33) Lisbon, Portugal
- Relatives: Viscount Alvalade (grandfather)
- Education: Harvard Medical School (did not graduate)

José Alfredo Holtreman Roquette (10 October 1885 – 19 October 1918), known as José Alvalade (Portuguese pronunciation: [ʒuˈzɛ alvɐˈlaðɨ]), was one of the founders and first club member of multisport club Sporting Clube de Portugal (Sporting CP or Sporting Lisbon) in the early twentieth century, founded along with brothers Stromp (Francisco and António), Henrique de Almeida Leite Junior, the Gavazzo brothers and others. His grandfather, Alfredo Augusto das Neves Holtreman, Viscount of Alvalade, a lawyer in the Portuguese capital, operated as a benefactor in the multisport club's foundation process by donating money and land to the new club, and took charge as its first president. Later, José Alvalade would become Sporting's 3rd president from 1910 to 1912.

== Biography ==
He was born into aristocracy, his parents were António Ferreira Roquette, paternal nephew of the 1st Baron of Salvaterra de Magos, and his wife Josefina Libânia Garin Holtreman, a native of Lisbon, who died when José Alfredo Holtreman Roquette, that would be widely known as José Alvalade, was still a child. His maternal grandfather was Alfredo Augusto das Neves Holtreman, 1st Viscount of Alvalade, a wealthy landlord and a lawyer established in Lisbon who worked for the Portuguese royal household in that capacity. Interested in sport from a young age, José Alfredo Holtreman Roquette was part of a sports association in Campo Grande called Campo Grande Football Club. Despite the name, Campo Grande Football Club was particularly active in the organization of parties, picnics and social dance events rather than sporting events, and this state of affairs made José Alvalade grow dissatisfied with the club. He studied medicine at Harvard Medical School for 3 years, dropping out of the medical school and eventually giving up a career in medicine, because he said he was too sensitive to deal with suffering and pain, as well as with blood.

== Sporting CP ==
In April 1906, José Alvalade expressed the intention to form a new club, with the support of several members of Campo Grande Football Club and the financial help of his grandfather, the Viscount of Alvalade, who oversaw the creation of the new club and made the grounds available for the construction of the stadium at his Quinta das Mouras, that covered the current areas of Lumiar, Campo Grande and Alvalade in Lisbon. With the financial and logistical support of the Viscount of Alvalade, who was the first president, Sporting CP was founded on 1 July 1906 after two months during which the newly-created sports club project was temporarily called Campo Grande Sporting Club instead of its final official name of Sporting Clube de Portugal. José Alvalade, a founder of the club who stood out for channelling crucial material support from his wealthy family, was the first club member, being the vice-president and manager of sports. He was also a football, cricket and tennis player. In June 1910 he was named president, the club's third president until then, a position he held until November 1912. Two years later, he left the institution because of disagreements with members of the board of directors.

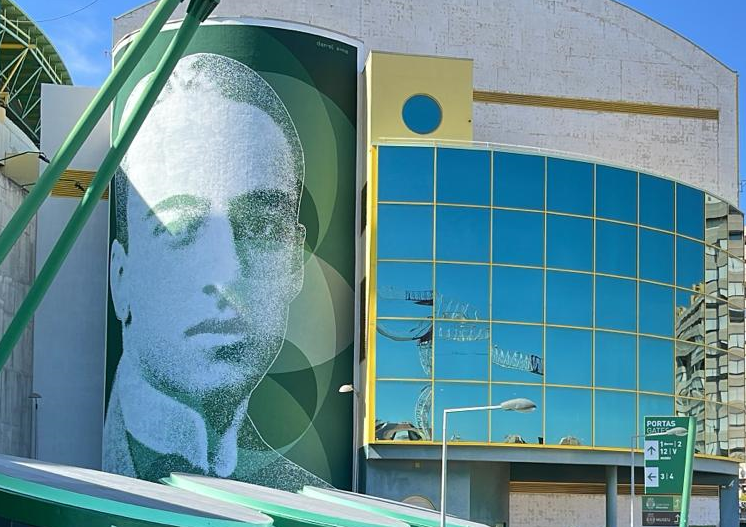
New José Alvalade image at Estádio José Alvalade in Lisbon, Portugal, during the execution of a work of building renovation in 2023

During the founding period, José Alvalade had the desire to make Sporting a "great club, as big as the biggest in Europe". Guided by the aspiration to open the way to sport in Portugal, when it was still at an embryonic stage of development and with very elitist characteristics, the first "sportinguistas" (Sporting CP supporters) founded Sporting Clube de Portugal pursuing the ideals of "Effort, Dedication, Devotion and Glory."

José Alvalade died at the age of 33, on 19 October 1918, a victim of the pneumonic epidemic.

In 1947, after a General Assembly of Sporting CP, it was decided that the stadium should adopt its current name, Estádio José Alvalade, in his honor, a name that was maintained by statutory imposition (according to Article 4(2) of the Statutes of Sporting Clube de Portugal) in Sporting CP's stadiums inaugurated on 10 June 1956 and 6 August 2003.
