= António Dias da Cunha =

Portuguese Businessman (born 1933)

António Augusto Serra Campos Dias da Cunha (born 1933 in Beira, Mozambique) is a Portuguese businessman.

== Early life ==
He was born in Mozambique when the territory was under Portuguese rule. He moved to Portugal at age nine.

He earned a Licentiate in Law from the Faculty of Law of the University of Lisbon. He practiced various sports while a college student, alternating between football, handball and basketball. In rugby he participated in the national championship of the 1st division.

== Career ==
He established many businesses and gave support to social institutions.

He associated with the Sporting CP at invitation of Emídio Pinheiro, a former President of the General Assembly. Before the Carnation Revolution he became a friend of José Roquette and, later went with him to the Direction of the SCP. In August 2000, he assumed the Club Presidency and of the Patrimony Managing Society of Sporting as the 45th president. He succeeded Roquette, who had transformed the club into a Sport Anonymous Society. Under his presidency started at the end of 2001 the works of the new Estádio José Alvalade and Sporting was national champion in soccer in the season 2001/2002. During his tenure he became notorious for his complaints of "the fault is the system's" often when the club suffered defeats that were not directly its own. He resigned in 2005 in solidarity with manager José Peseiro and was succeeded by Filipe Soares Franco.

Da Cunha is not a member of a political party, but is connected to the Socialist Party, and publicly supported the candidacies of Mário Soares and Jorge Sampaio.
