= Dirk Stoop =

Dutch Golden Age painter and engraver

Dirk Stoop (c. 1618–1686) was a widely travelled painter and engraver of the Dutch Golden Age. Alternative versions of his name include Dirck Stoff, Theodorus (van der) Stoop, Thierry (the French version) and Rod(e)rigo, by which he was known in Portugal.

== Biography ==
Dirk Stoop was an artist working during the Dutch Golden Age known primarily for his paintings and engravings.

Several biographies list four or five artists of the same name though official documents show there is only one Dirk Stoop to speak of. What confirms Dirk Stoop's relation to Utrecht is father Willem Jansz Stoop, who worked as a glass painter in Utrecht from 1633 onwards. Archives containing records of the deceased from 1647 verify that Dirk was the child of Willem Jansz. The Stoop family lived in "de Smedesteghe" according to various archival records. The marriage of his brother Jan implies the family was Catholic, though this cannot be confirmed as the church records are no longer fully complete. By analyzing the dates of his parents' deaths, an approximate birth year of Dirk Stoop could be recorded as 1618. The documented events of his life correspond with this date, or at least they do not contradict with it. Little is known regarding Stoop's early years. Nonetheless, it can be said that the artist was a traveler: he was in Italy between 1635 and 1645. After his years in Italy, the artist went back to Utrecht by 1647 and was living there at least until 1651, possibly until 1660. The year 1661 marks his travel to Portugal in which his encounter with Infanta Catherine leads to him moving to England in 1662 and staying there until 1665. As per Horace Walpole, Dirk Stoop resided in Durham Yard (London). If he indeed returned to the Netherlands in 1678 and died in 1686, it follows that he did not reside in Utrecht during that period, contrary to what some authors have asserted. Based on records in which the name Rodrigo Stoff is mentioned in relation to legal proceedings against the Painters Guild of Hamburg, it is possible that the artist resided there from 1667 onwards. He was granted the freedom to work in the city by the painters guild in 1681, making it probable that he spent the last two decades of his life mostly in and around northern Germany. In an examination of Utrecht's death records until 1725 Dirk Stoop's name is not listed, indicating he did not pass away there.

Italy

Like many European artists of the time, Stoop traveled to Italy, the epicenter of the art world. Traveling to Italy was a very common practice for artists that would have the opportunity to further their training by seeing, first hand, the oeuvre of Renaissance Italian Masters and the remains of antiquity. Dutch Italianate artists developed their own style and realistic approach to painting Italian landscapes. Their works reveal particular attention to light and a focus on life in the countryside or campagna. As such, their pieces feature scenes of the Italian countryside, caves and old ruins. Many Italianate landscape artists were also printmakers, their etchings which were easy to transport popularised their works in the Netherlands.

Two pieces signed by Dirk Stoop confirm his stay in Italy, the first "Site accidenté d'Italie" (Rugged Italian Landscape) was sold in Valenciennes in 1898..The second "a View of Tivoli in Rome" is mentioned in an auction catalogue. It is probable that he stayed in Italy between 1635 and 1645 and lived an itinerant lifestyle traveling from the countryside to major cities like Rome.

Portugal and England

Dirk Stoop's artistic career took an international dimension when he traveled to Portugal in 1661, becoming a court painter to Infanta Catherine of Braganza. His role included creating detailed etchings of Lisbon, one of which explicitly names him as "Theodorus Stoop, Painter to Her Majesty".

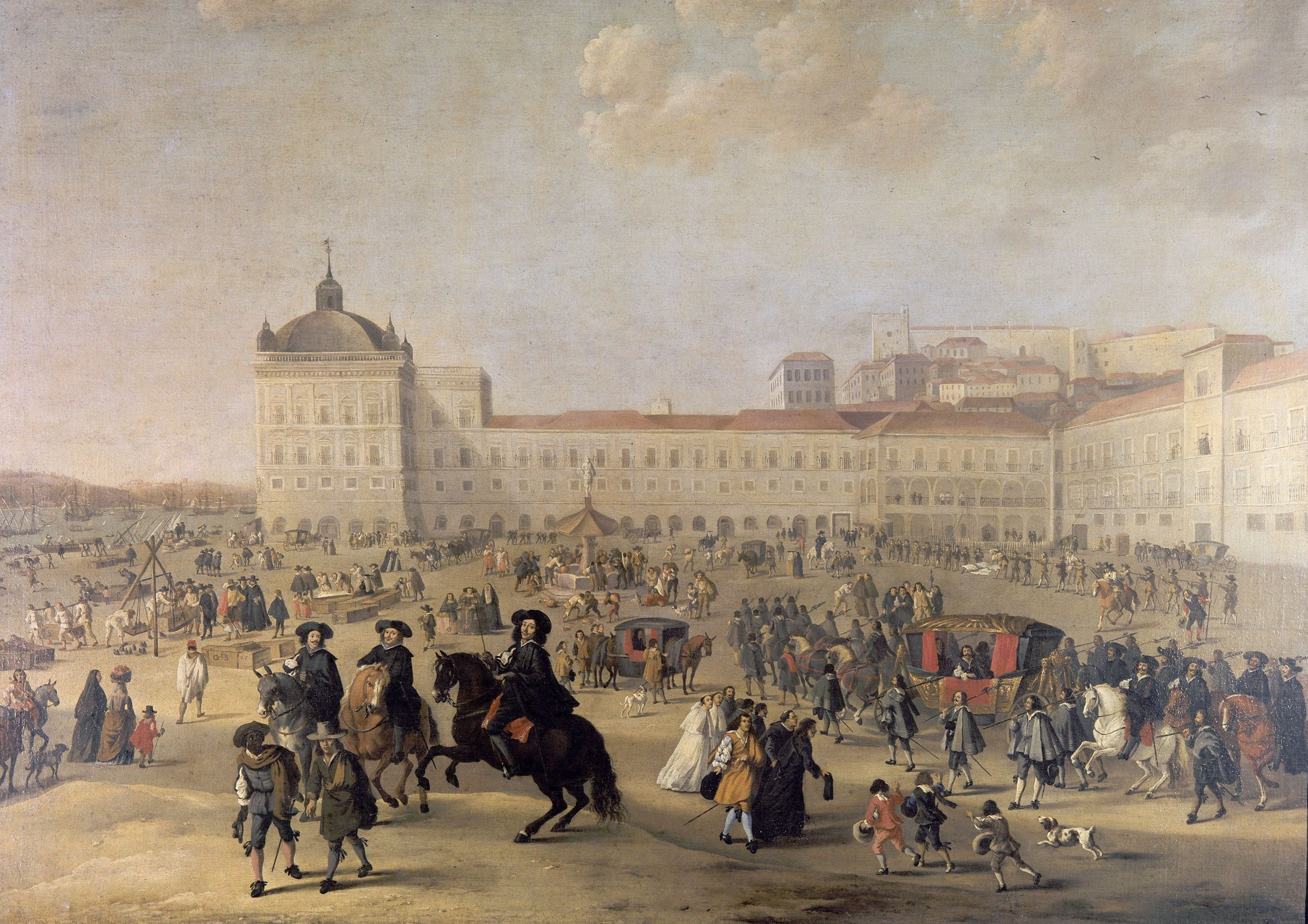
Stoop's painting of the Terreiro do Paço; Pimenta Palace, Lisbon City Museum collection

In 1662, Dirk Stoop followed Infanta Catherine of Braganza to England when she married King Charles II, marking a significant shift in his career. As a court painter, Stoop was responsible for documenting royal ceremonies, processions, and grand public celebrations. Stoop's etchings from this time also include major events such as the arrival of Catherine to England, as well as other ceremonial events. However, Stoop signed these works as "Roderigo Stoop" or "Theodorus Stoop," Latinized versions of his name that later led to confusion among art historians. One of his significant works that he created in England is an etching titled "rare afbeelding van den Bloedigen Seeslacht . . . geschiet omtrent Saoul-Baai den 3 en 4 Juine des jaers 1665. (signed Ro Stoop f. London)." Alongside the depictions of royal ceremonial events, Stoop proves to be confident in his multi-genre skills by portraying historical battles which made him a valuable painter in courtrooms. The last dated work of Stoop is a 1672 portrait of Dutch naval captain Isaäc Rochussen, renowned for capturing the English East India Company ship, the Gouden Valk, on July 7, 1672. The engraving on a memorial medal from that occasion verifies this. Nevertheless, it appears unlikely that an artist employed by the English court would have been tasked with depicting a Dutch naval hero. Furthermore, it is uncertain that Rochussen would have sat for the portrait at Stoop's studio in Durham Yard (London).

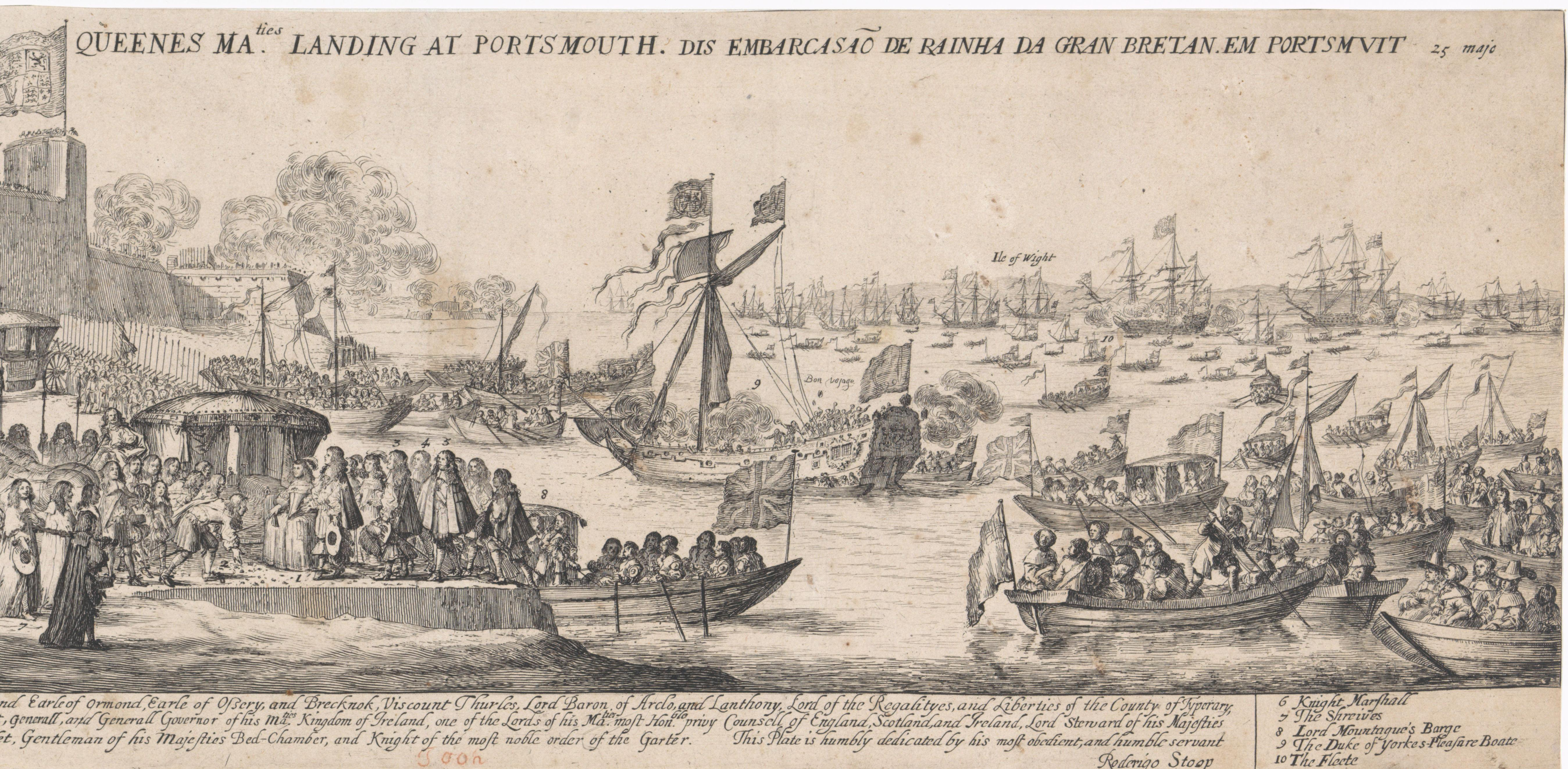
Arrival of Queen Catherine of Braganza in Portsmouth (1662) – Rijksmuseum, Amsterdam

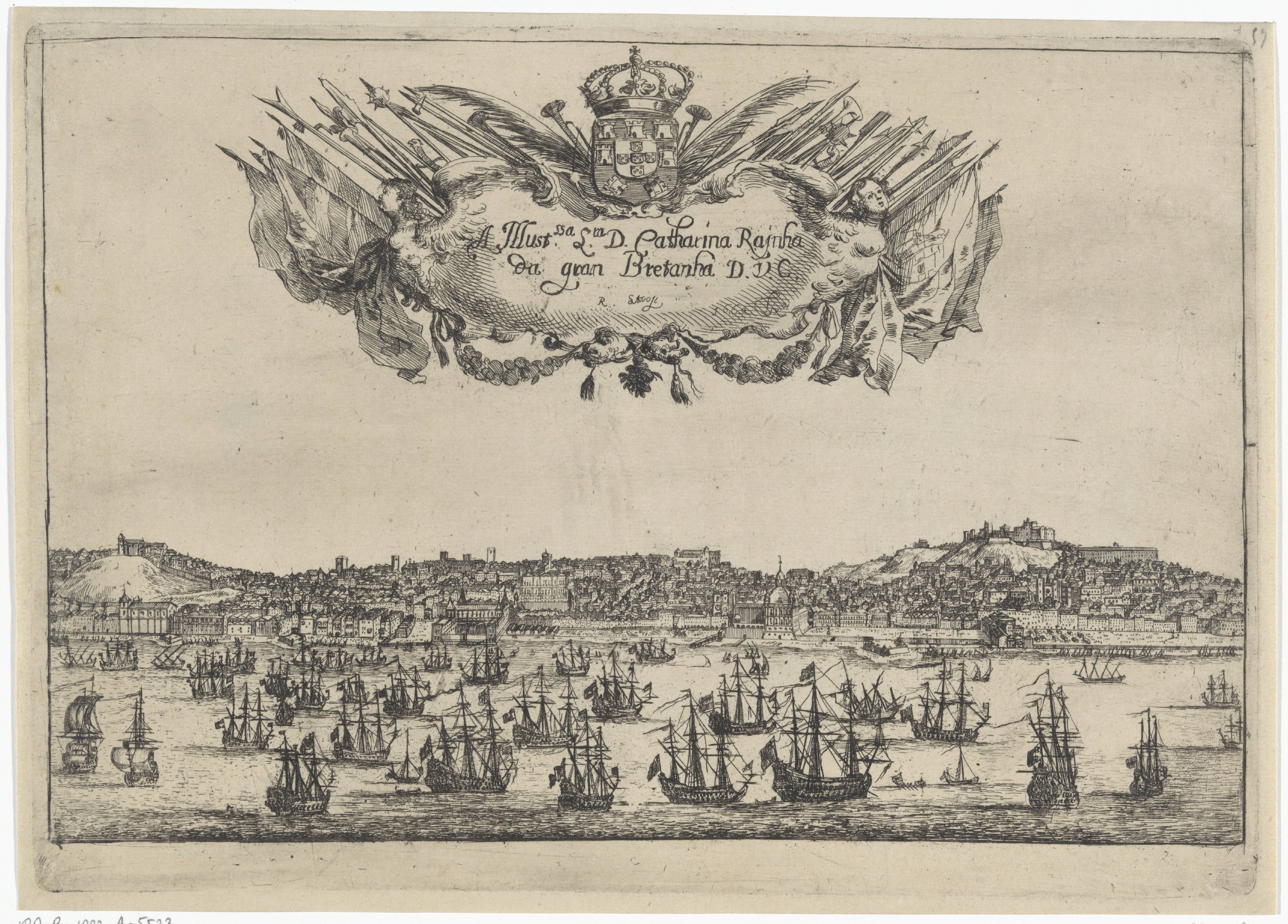
View of the city and port of Lisbon (1662) – Rijksmuseum, Amsterdam

Germany

In his late career, Dirk Stoop also traveled to Germany and more specifically in the city of Hamburg where he is mentioned as Rodrigo Stoff. The artistic tradition in Hamburg developed during the 16th century and benefitted from the lively cultural exchange with the Netherlands. Registers from the painters' guild allow to retrace the timeline of Stoop's stay in the city. He is already mentioned from 1667 as being involved in a lawsuit against the guild. Stoop's dispute with the guild continued for years as in 1674, he was involved with the government of the Hamburg Cathedral against which the guild was protesting. It is only in 1681 that Stoop was accepted in the painters' guild and granted the right to work and assist in its meetings.

Dirk Stoop is not mentioned in the death registers of the city of Utrecht so it is possible that he died in Hamburg around 1686.

== Style and Subject Matter ==
Throughout his career, Dirk Stoop worked in several mediums, mainly paintings and etchings, and focussed on several subject matters, with his style being noticeably influenced by his travels in Italy.

Dirk Stoop's paintings, particularly his battle scene works are typified by their confident brushwork. The artist frequently painted entire contours in a single stroke and built up details on top of already-finished areas. His use of light emphasised sharp outlines, which added depth to Stoop's works. His colour scheme primarily featured warm browns and vivid blues, with subtle variations in shading, present in the horses, landscapes, and skies, while yellow, red, and green accents provided contrast. The use of such primarily warm colours was typical of landscape painters who had travelled to Italy.

Before the 1660s Stoop primarily painted landscapes featuring hunting scenes and equestrian fights, leading the biographer Arnold Houbraken to refer to him as a "horse painter". His compositions of this kind differ in some respects from those of his contemporaries as they are always situated in nature and the horses are often depicted in motion, accompanied by companion hunters and horsemen. These scenes are generally conceived from a short distance making them quite detailed. Sharp light makes contours stand out more clearly. Naturally, the horse is rendered with special care, with the movements, the many positions and all manner of 'shortening' being mostly correctly rendered. Interestingly, the motif of a urinating horse or donkey is present in several of Stoop's paintings and prints (see The Hunting Party and Hunters Resting).

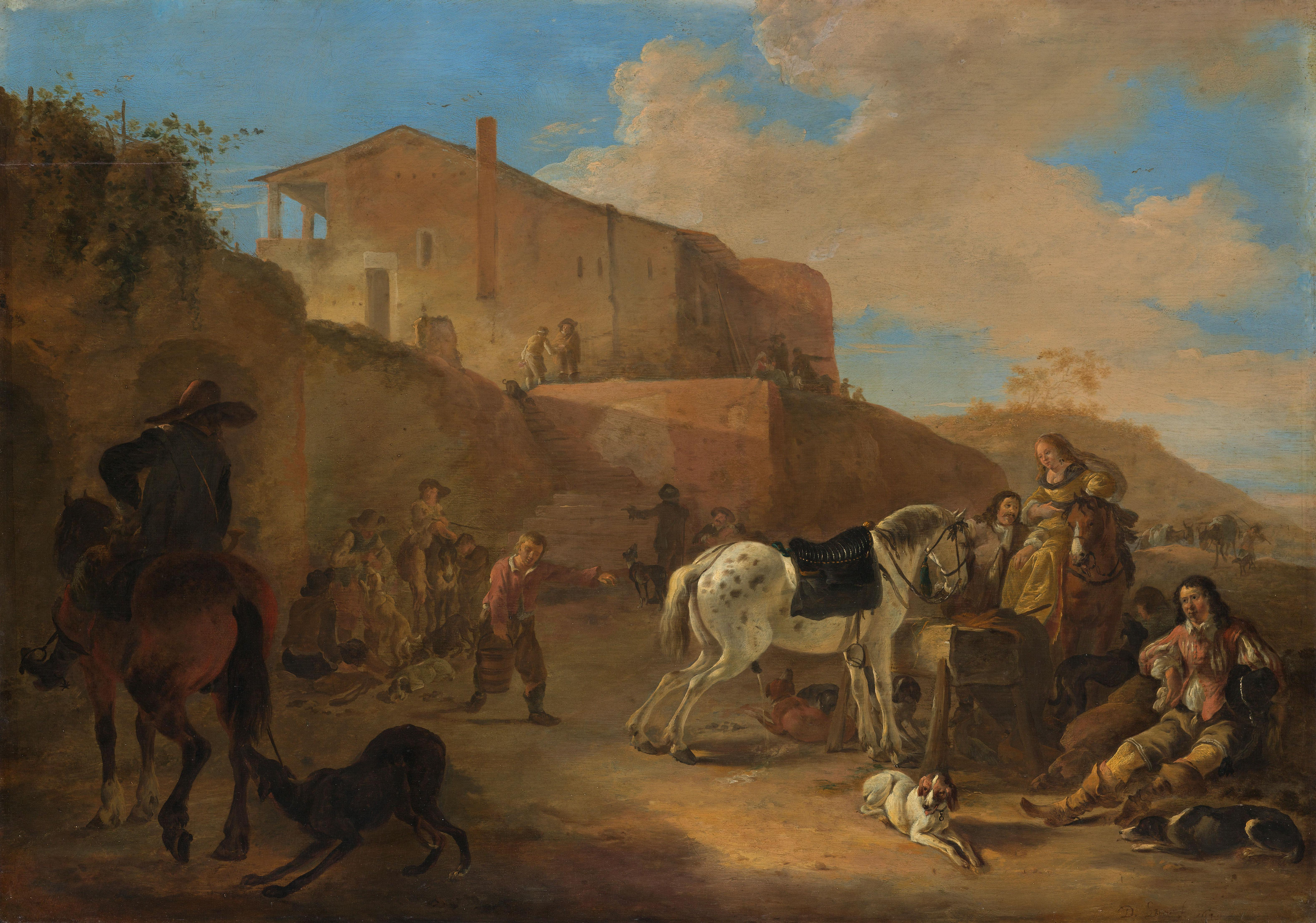
The Hunting Party (1649) – Rijksmuseum, Amsterdam

In the 1640s and 1650s Stoop also produced several Grotto scenes, which were popular in Utrecht and Amsterdam at the time, and once again characterised by Italianate influence. Such scenes often included figures dressed in oriental costumes, and equestrian companies embellished through the addition of monuments or other smaller structures including plinths and obelisks. The contrast between the visible daylight and the more dimly lit cave interiors gives these scenes a mystical atmosphere, which is heightened by the aforementioned mise-en-scene.

Starting in 1661, upon his appointment as the court painter of Catherine of Braganza, his surviving and attributed body of work is dominated by engravings, one notable exception being a painted portrait of the Infante. Apart from his series of engravings that document the Infante's journey from Lisbon to London, Stoop produces a series of engravings on the Fables of Aesop around this time. These works are a departure from his regular subject matter as they feature a number of exotic animals and mythical figures.

== Selected works ==
- A Hunting Party in a Landscape (c. 1640s) – National Gallery of Ireland, Dublin
- Rest during the Hunt (1643) – Statens Museum for Kunst, Copenhagen
- Rider fight (1644) Grotto (1650)
- The Siege of Oudewater by the Spanish in 1575 (1650) – Oudewater Townhall
- The Hunting Party – Museum of Fine Arts, Budapest
- Battle between Europeans and Orientals – Staatliches Museum Schwerin, Schwerin
- The Encampment – Gemäldegalerie Alte Meister, Staatliche Kunstsammlungen Dresden

== Gallery ==
Paintings

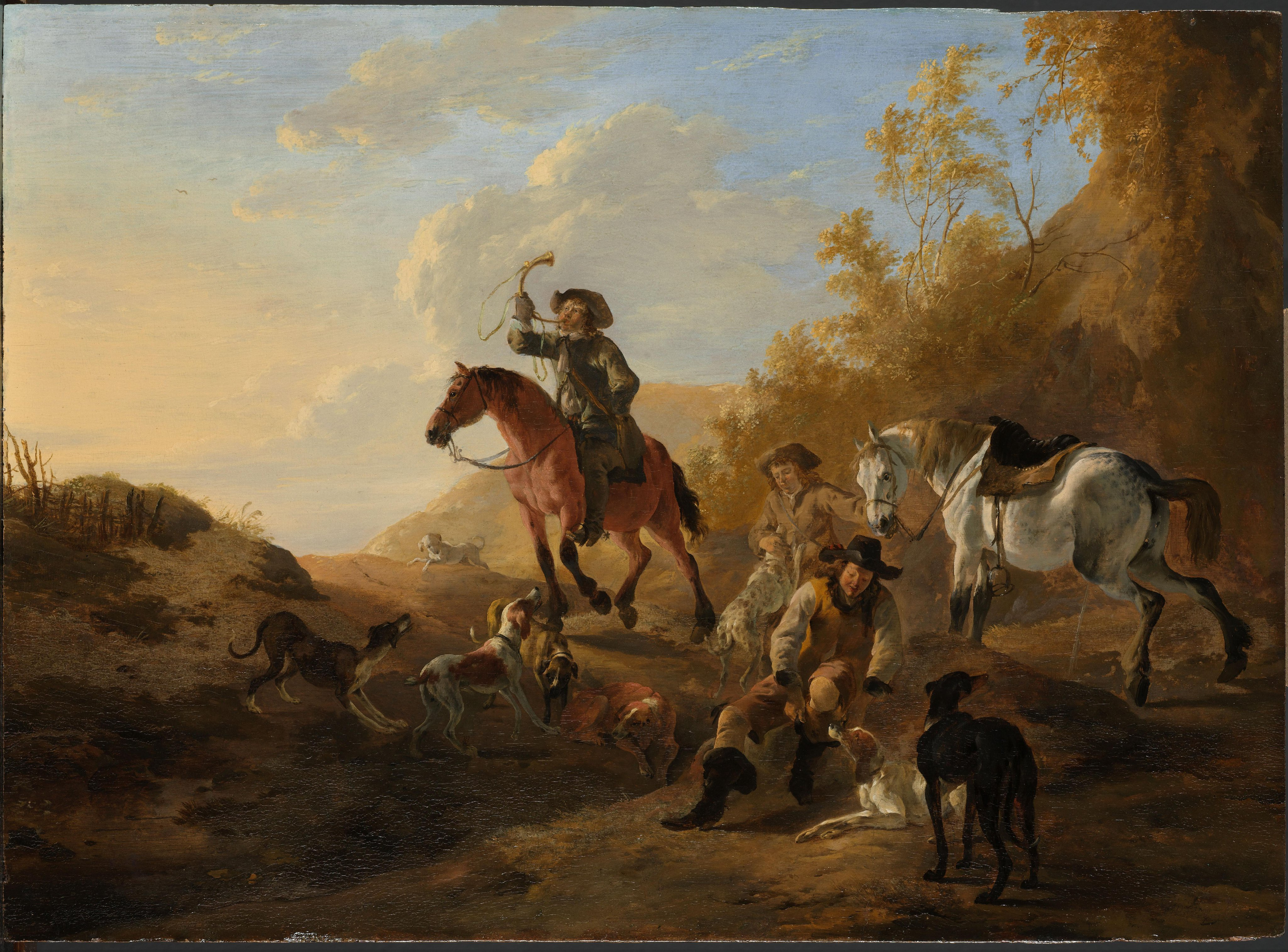
Hunters Resting (c. 1650 - 1655) – Rijksmuseum, Amsterdam

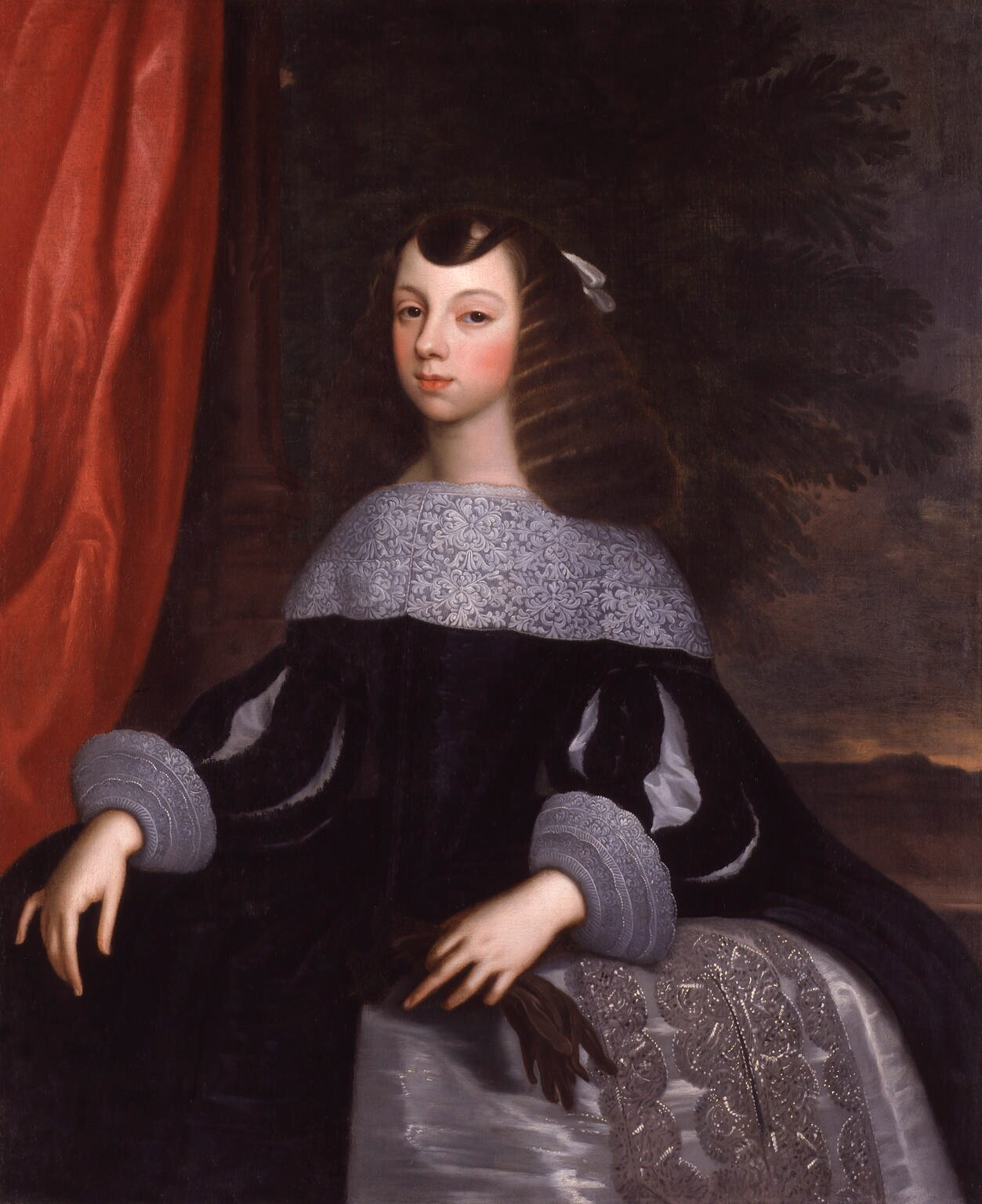
Catherine of Braganza (c. 1660- 1661) - National Portrait Gallery, London

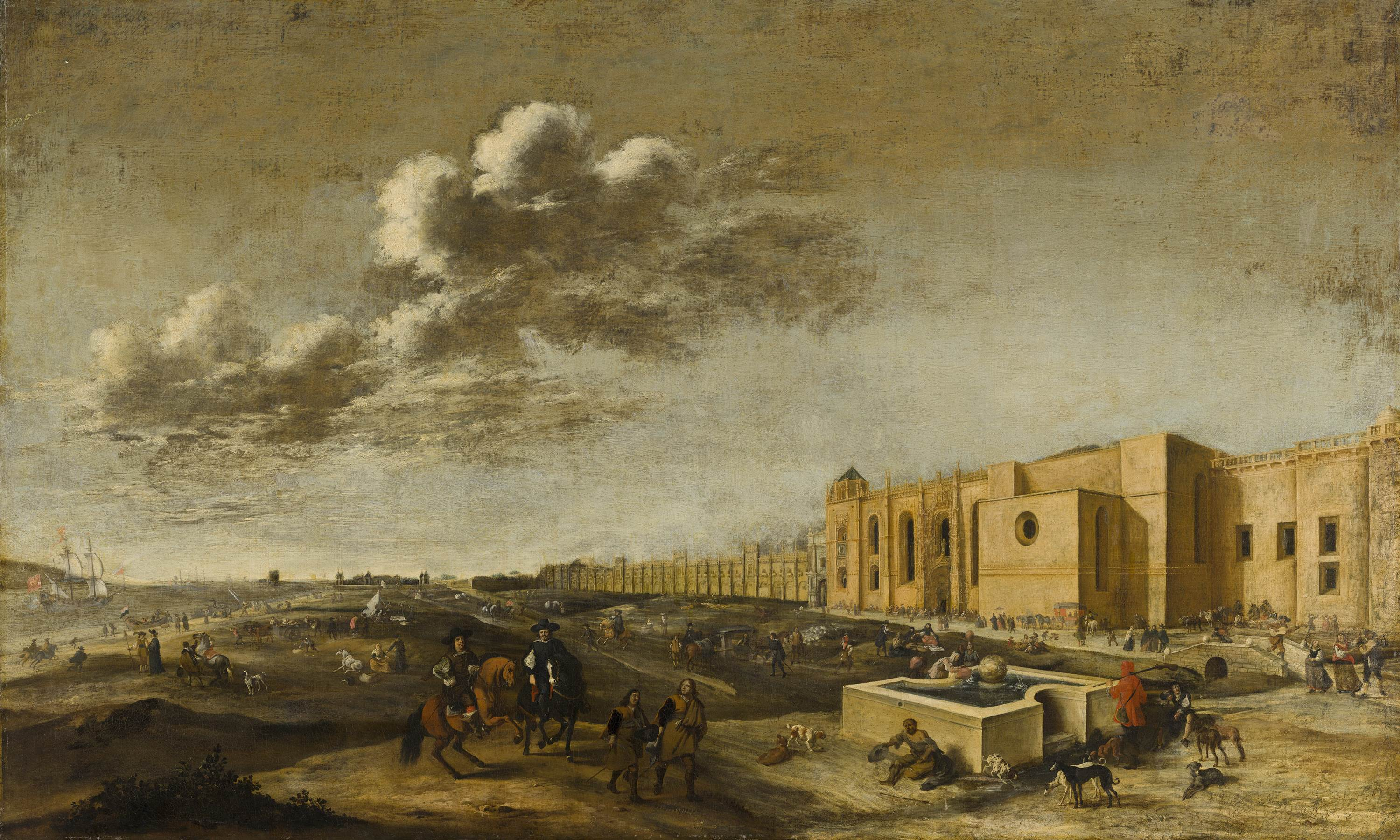
View of Belem Monastery near Lisbon (c. 1660- 1670) – Mauritshuis, The Hague

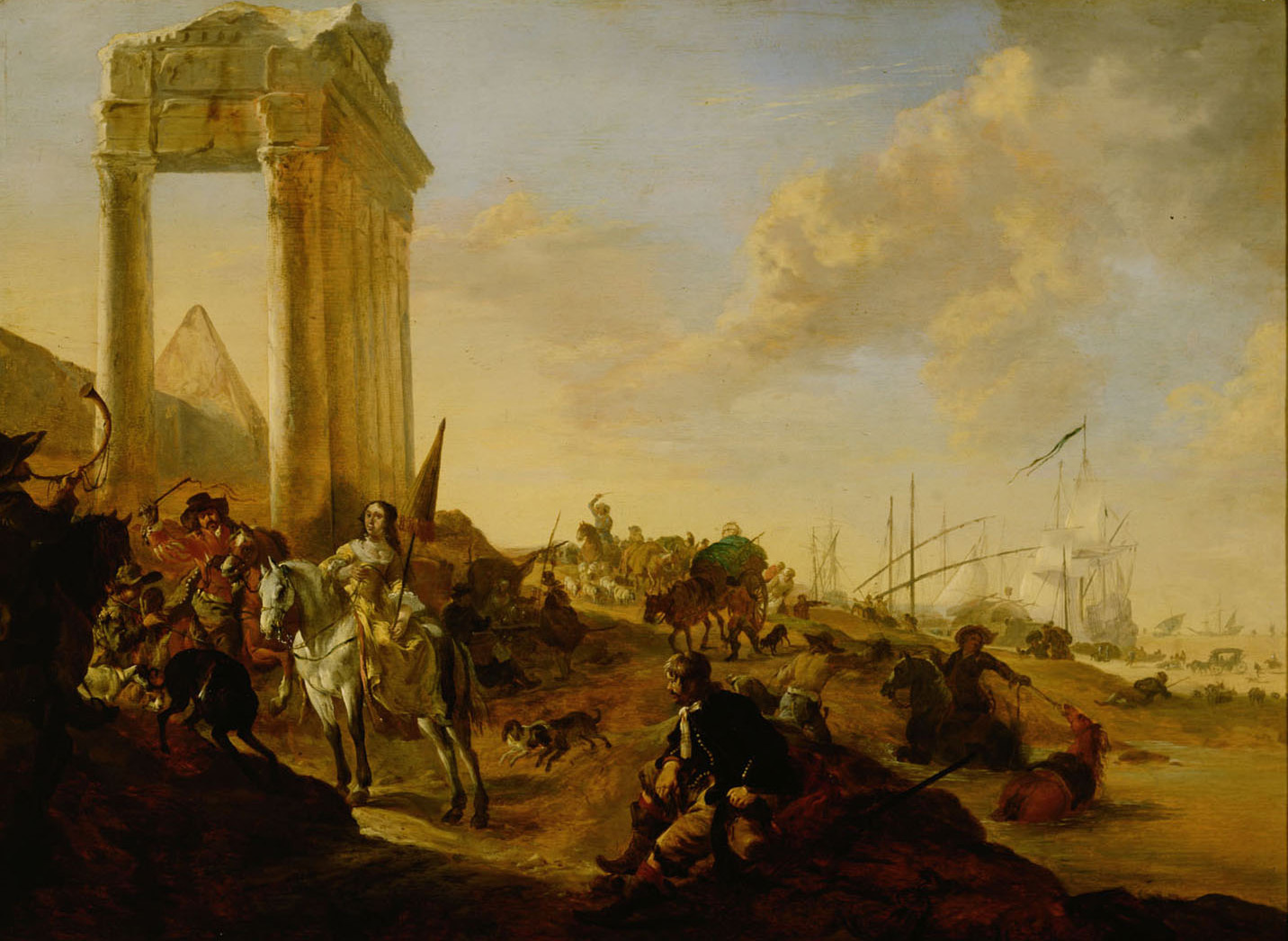
Italian Seacoast (c. 1675 - 1686) – Kunsthistorisches Museum, Vienna KHM-Museumsverband

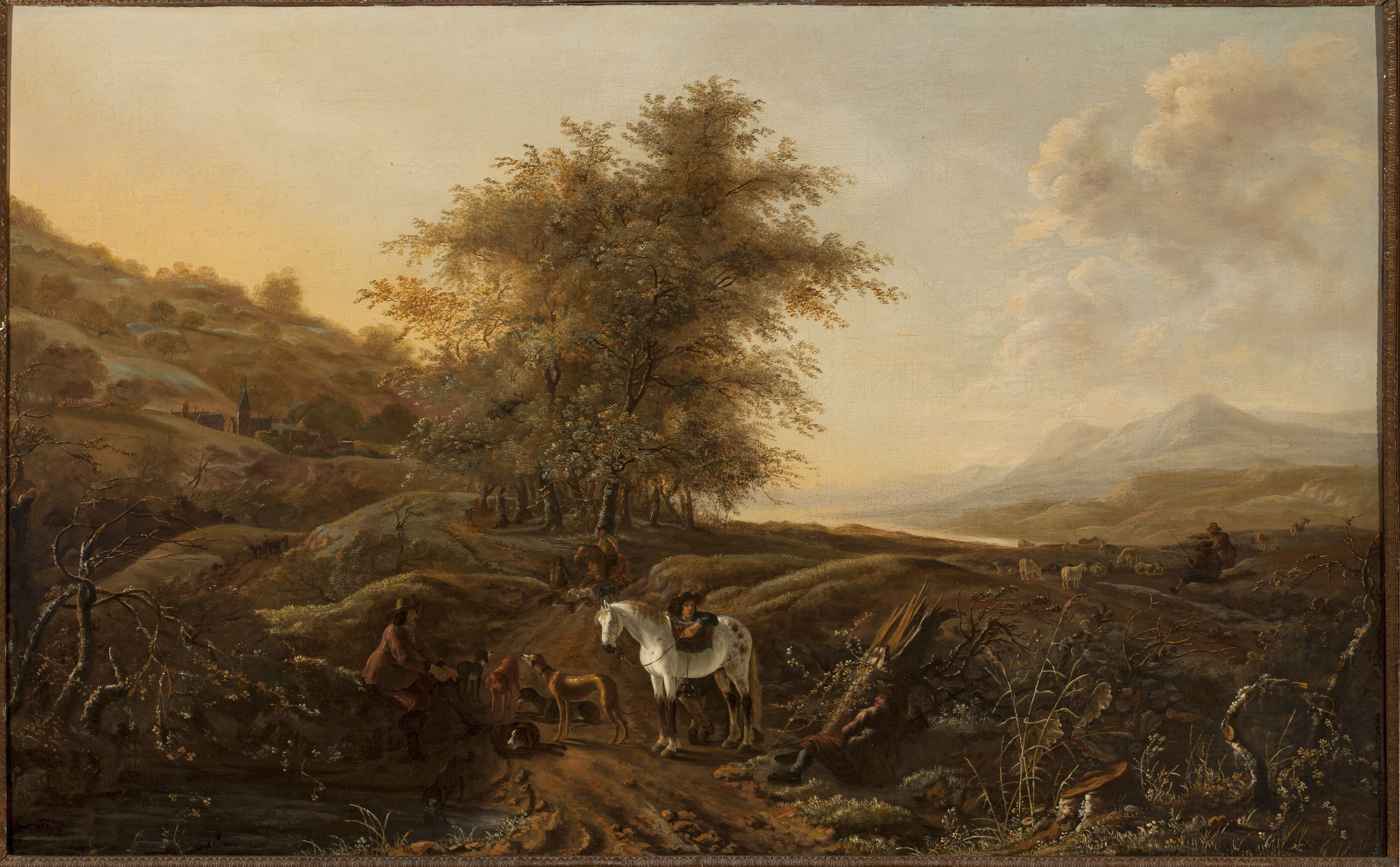
Landscape with Hunters – National Museum in Warsaw
