= Filipe Soares Franco =

Filipe Pinto Basto Soares Franco (born 11 March 1953 in Lisbon) was the 46th president of Sporting CP, one of Portugal's biggest comprehensive sports clubs, second child and second son of Rui Guedes Soares Franco and Isabel Maria da Câmara Ferreira Pinto Basto (Noblemen of Coat of Arms – and a descendant of Louis, comte de Narbonne-Lara, of the Duke of Loulé and of Infanta Ana de Jesus Maria of Portugal).

He succeeded António Dias da Cunha in 2006 after the latter resigned in solidarity with manager José Peseiro. He won the election held on 28 April 2006 with 70% of the votes, beating Guilherme Lemos and Abrantes Mendes.

After his "Project Finance" was defeated in general assembly, Soares Franco called for elections, saying he would not be a candidate in the presidential run. However, on 12 April 2006, he officially announced his candidacy. Still, on 2 June, his proposal to the Project Finance was not approved by members of the club so he ended up not running for the Presidency.

On 5 July 2009 he was succeeded in the Presidential chair by José Eduardo Bettencourt who defeated Paulo Pereira Cristóvão.

He presented a candidateship to the Portuguese Football Federation on 7 September 2011 but withdrew on 4 October due to lack of support.

He was married to and divorced Isabel Maria Borges Coutinho. The couple has four children.
