= List of Sporting CP presidents =

Ever since its founding in 1906, Sporting Clube de Portugal has had 43 presidents serving a total of 51 terms. To elect a president, Sporting Clube de Portugal members (known as Sócios) vote in an Assembleia Geral, a club member's meeting, whenever a president's term comes to an end. The first president was the Viscount of Alvalade and the current one is Frederico Varandas, since 9 September 2018. The longest serving president was João Rocha, whose presidency lasted for thirteen consecutive years from 1973 to 1986, while the shortest presidency was that of Valadão Chagas, who stepped down on 30 March 1973, the day after he was elected.

== List of presidents ==
This is a list of all the presidents of Sporting Club de Portugal.

Name	Country	From	To
The Viscount of Alvalade	Portugal	1906	1910
Luís Caetano Pereira	Portugal	1910	1910
José Alvalade	Portugal	1910	1912
Luís Caetano Pereira	Portugal	1912	1913
Mota Marques	Portugal	1913	1914
Daniel Queirós dos Santos	Portugal	1914	1918
Mário de Lemos Pistacchini	Portugal	1918	1918
António Nunes Soares	Portugal	1918	1918
Mário de Lemos Pistacchini	Portugal	1918	1921
António Nunes Soares	Portugal	1921	1921
Manuel García Cárabe	Spain	1921	1922
Júlio Barreiros Cardoso de Araújo	Portugal	1922	1923
Pedro Sanches Navarro	Portugal	1923	1924
Júlio Barreiros Cardoso de Araújo	Portugal	1924	1925
José Salazar Carreira	Portugal	1925	1926
Pedro Sanches Navarro	Portugal	1926	1927
António Nunes Soares	Portugal	1927	1928
Joaquim Guerreiro de Oliveira Duarte	Portugal	1928	1929
Eduardo Mário Costa	Portugal	1929	1929
Álvaro José de Sousa	Portugal	1929	1931
Artur Silva	Portugal	1931	1932
Carlos Correia Pinto da Silva	Portugal	1932	1932
Álvaro Luís Retamoza Dias	Portugal	1932	1932
Joaquim Guerreiro de Oliveira Duarte	Portugal	1932	1942
Augusto Amado de Aguilar	Portugal	1942	1943
Diogo Alves Furtado	Portugal	1943	1943
Alberto da Cunha e Silva	Portugal	1943	1944
Augusto Fernando Barreira de Campos	Portugal	1944	1946
António José Ribeiro Ferreira	Portugal	1946	1953
Carlos Góis Mota	Portugal	1953	1957
Francisco do Cazal Ribeiro	Portugal	1957	1958
Guilherme Braga Brás Medeiros	Portugal	1958	1961
Gaudêncio Luís da Silva Costa	Portugal	1961	1962
Joel Azevedo da Silva Pascoal	Portugal	1962	1963
Horácio José de Sá Viana Rebelo	Portugal	1963	1964
Martiniano Alexandre Pissarra Homem de Figueiredo	Portugal	1964	1965
Guilherme Braga Brás Medeiros	Portugal	1965	1973
Orlando Valadão Chagas	Portugal	1973	1973
Manuel Henrique Nazareth	Portugal	1973	1973
João Rocha	Portugal	1973	1986
João Amado de Freitas	Portugal	1986	1988
Jorge Manuel Alegre Gonçalves	Portugal	1988	1989
José Sousa Cintra	Portugal	1989	1995
Pedro Santana Lopes	Portugal	1995	1996
José Holtreman Roquette	Portugal	1996	2000
António Dias da Cunha	Portugal / Mozambique	2000	2005
Filipe Soares Franco	Portugal	2005	2009
José Eduardo Bettencourt	Portugal	2009	2011
Luís Godinho Lopes	Portugal	2011	2013
Bruno de Carvalho	Portugal	2013	2018
Frederico Varandas	Portugal	2018	—
