= Casa dos Bicos =

Building in Lisbon

House of Beaks/Spikes
- Casa dos Bicos
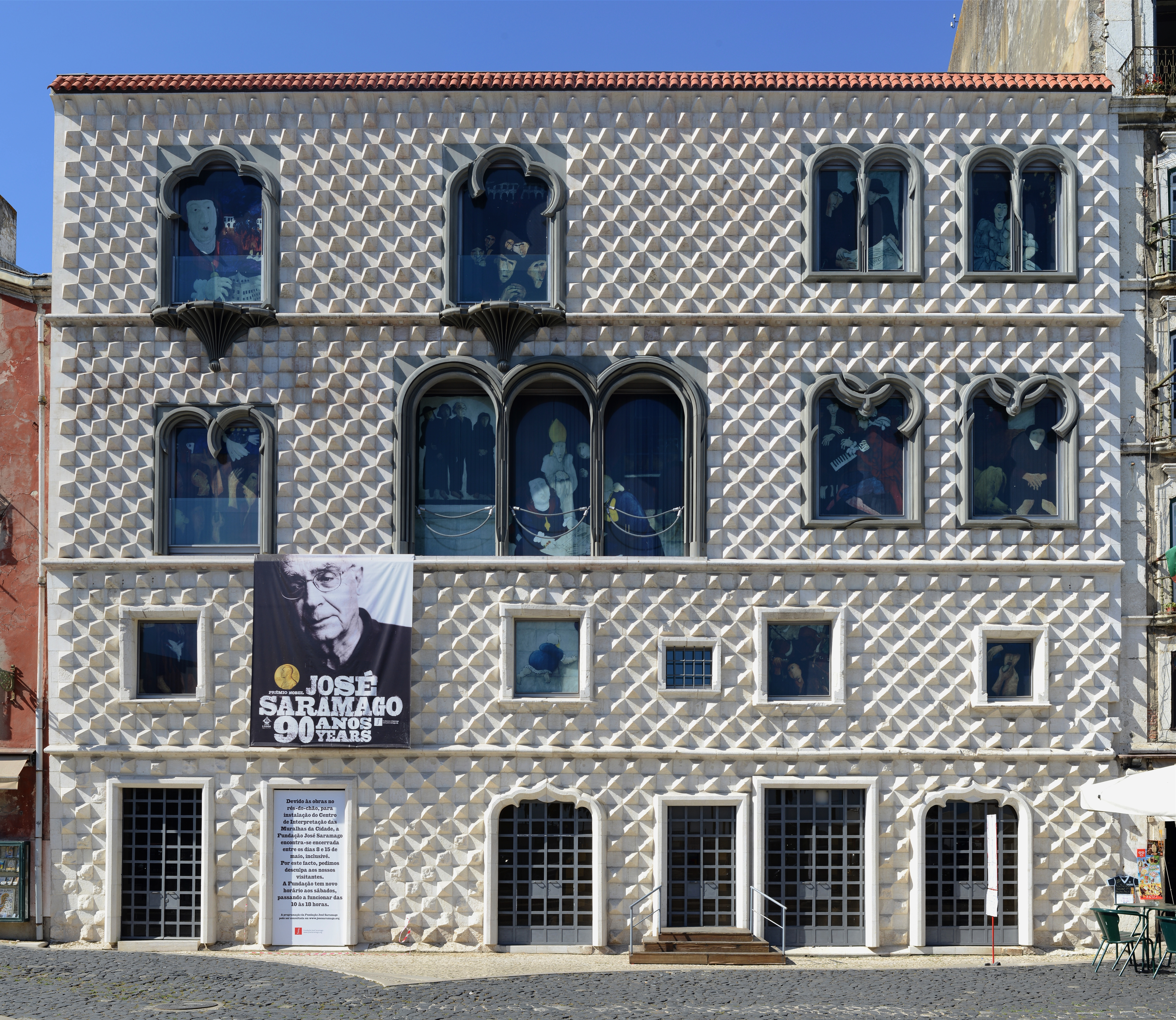
- The Casa dos Bicos, headquarters of the José Saramago Foundation

- Location of the residence within the municipality of Lisbon

General information
- Type: Residence
- Architectural style: Art Nouveau
- Location: Santa Maria Maior, Portugal
- Coordinates: 38°42′32.8″N 9°7′57.7″W
- Opened: 1523
- Owner: Portuguese Republic

Technical details
- Material: Masonry

Design and construction
- Architect: António Marques Miguel

The Casa dos Bicos (Portuguese pronunciation: [ˈkazɐ ðuʒ ˈβikuʃ]; "House of the Beaks/Spikes") is a historical house in the civil parish of Santa Maria Maior, in the Portuguese municipality of Lisbon. The house, built in the early 16th century in the Alfama neighbourhood, has a curious façade of spikes, influenced by Italian Renaissance palaces and Portuguese Manueline styles. It survived the disastrous 1755 Lisbon earthquake that destroyed much of the city, but over time was abandoned as a residence and used as a warehouse. After a 20th-century renovation, it became the headquarters of the José Saramago Foundation and a location of the Museum of Lisbon.

== History ==
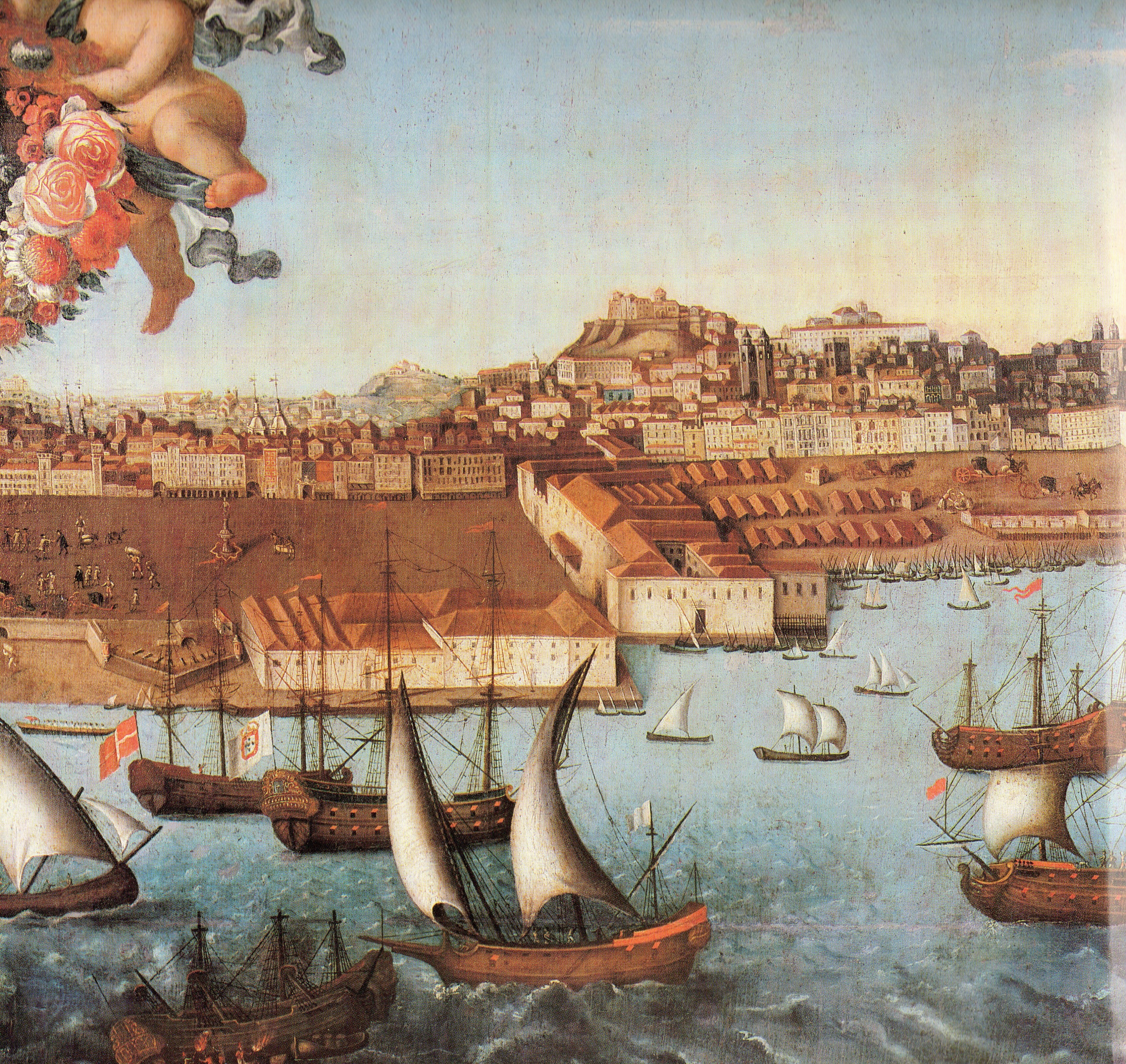
A view along the Tagus River, c. 1730, showing the area in Santa Maria Maior and the Casa dos Bicos (tenth from the right in front of the right square)

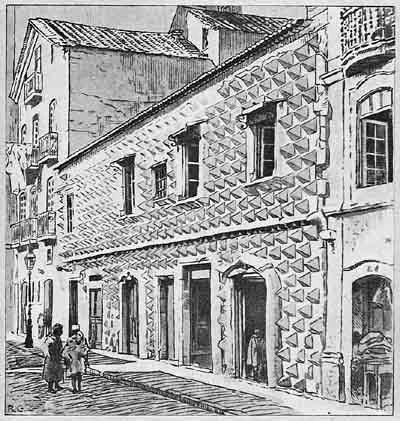
A public image from between 1910 and 1920, published in Lisboa Velha (Afonso Lopes Vieira), showing the former codfish warehouse in 1925

The historical record indicates that as of 1506, Afonso de Albuquerque, the first governor of Portuguese India, had buildings in the area, if not ownership of the lands. In 1521, his son Brás de Albuquerque travelled to Italy in the company of the Infanta Beatrice, Duchess of Savoy, and spent some years there, where he observed the new trends in Renaissance architecture. The young Albuquerque, a courtier recognized for his humanist cultural leanings, was responsible for the construction of the Quinta da Bacalhôa. It is presumed that he was influenced by urban palaces such as the Palazzo dei Diamanti (in Ferrara), so called in reference to its façade made up of thousands of small diamond-shaped pyramids. Between 1521 and 1523, Albuquerque returned to Portugal, and began work on this Casa dos Diamantes (House of Diamonds), incorporating Manueline (Portuguese late Gothic architecture) windows and portals, but died in 1581.

Between 1620 and 1642, after a protracted period of litigation within the family, the house passed into the hands of João Afonso de Albuquerque. The building was still in the possession of his heirs, the Menezes e Albuquerque family, when the 1755 Lisbon earthquake caused significant damage to the residence. It destroyed the principal façade facing Rua Afonso de Albuquerque and two floors along the Rua dos Bacalhoeiros. It is unclear when the building was reconstructed, but by 1772 it was partially reconstructed.

In 1827, Francisco Menezes e Albuquerque, owing to debts, allowed the house to be sold at public auction. It was sold to Caetano Lopes da Silva, a fishmonger, then a renter in the home. In 1838 the residence was returned to the Melo e Albuquerque family by a judicial decision. In 1873, the 11th and last Senhor of Albuquerque, owing to debts, sold the building to another fishmonger, Joaquim C. Lopes da Silva, who began using the building as a warehouse for salted codfish.

The building remained in private hands until the 1960s, when it was acquired by the municipal council of Lisbon. The council commissioned architect Raul Lino to adapt the Casa dos Bicos, then known as the Casa de Goa, for use as a museum. The project was still unrealized by 1979, and passed to architects José Daniel Santa-Rita Fernandes and Manuel Vicente. Once again, the project was never completed, and in 1982, the commissioner for the 18th European Art, Science and Culture Exposition (XVII Exposição Europeia de Arte, Ciência e Cultura) commissioned António Marques Miguel to restore and adapt the spaces for the event. The restoration began under the guidance of the Direcção-Geral de Edifícios e Monumentos Nacionais (DGEMN). A team of archeologists began systematic excavations at the construction site, revealing remains from the Roman and Moorish periods. The two floors destroyed during the 1755 earthquake were restored, using the pre-1755 drawings and paintings; these included a Renaissance loggia along the third floor and Manueline-style windows. In the following year, architect António Marques Miguel was responsible for restoration of the windows and façade. Following the public works, it became one of the nuclei of the European Art, Science and Cultural Exposition, exhibiting paintings of the Avis dynastic family.

On 22 August 2006, the Direção Regional de Cultura de Lisboa (DRC Lisboa) incorporated the building in the Special Protection Zone that included the Pombaline downtown area, as well as the Castle of São Jorge, its walls and surrounding buildings. The Conselho Nacional de Cultura (National Council for Culture) proposed that the Special Protection Zone should be archived on 10 October 2011, and on 18 October asked the director of the Instituto de Gestão do Património Arquitectónico e Arqueológico (IGESPAR) to define a new Special Protection Zone.

In June 2012, the Casa dos Bicos became the head office of the José Saramago Foundation, whose statutes were updated to reflect its new status as a public foundation, by an agreement with the Lisbon city council. The foundation opened a permanent exhibition titled The Seed and the Fruits about the life and public works of José Saramago. Other cultural events are presented in the building, including book releases, minor theater plays, talks and debates.

== Architecture ==
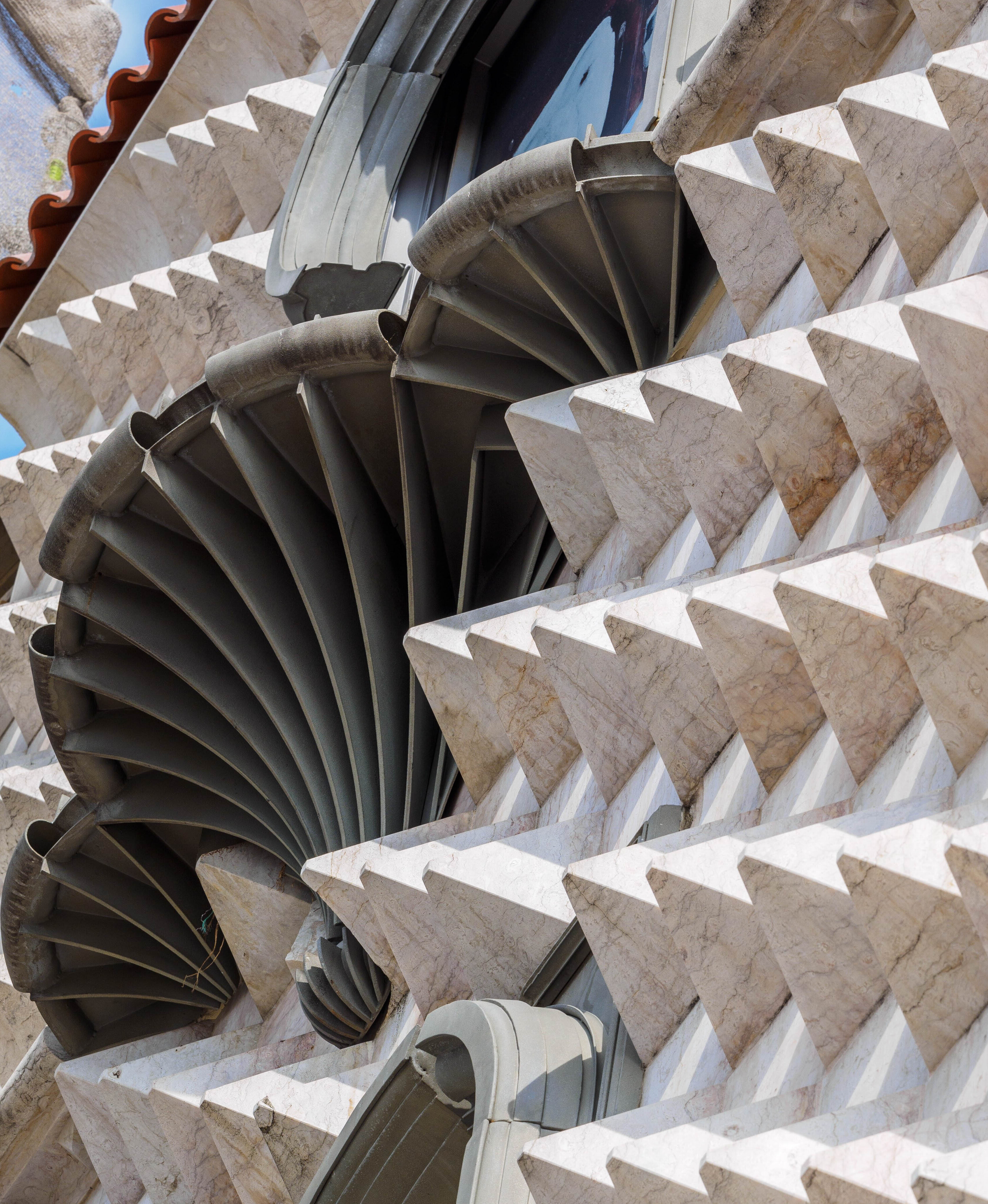
Detail of the front façade and varanda

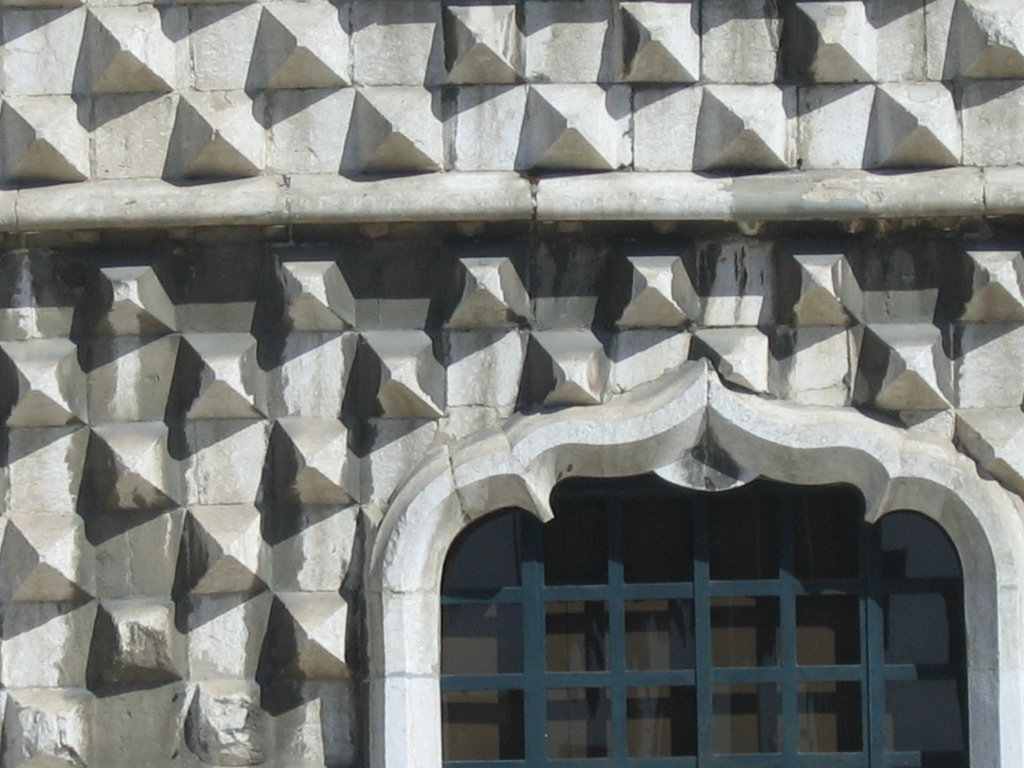
Detail of the front façade

The Casa dos Bicos is situated along the northern side of the street, contiguous with other buildings and identifiable by the surface treatment of its façade. It is a rectangular building of four floors, with irregular fenestrations (windows) and a tiled roof.

The principal façade, to the south, is decorated in diamond-shape protrusions. The floors are demarcated by frames that run along the façade. The first and second floors are framed by doors and windows in stonework; the first floor includes four simple doorways of varying dimensions and asymmetrical distribution (some rectangular, while two doors marked by convex arcs). On the second floor are four rectangular windows of varying dimensions and asymmetrical distribution. The third and fourth floors are marked by windows of varying dimensions and asymmetrical placement, using stylized single, double and triple rounded windows. Two styles of windows prevail on these floors: simple rounded-arch windows (a triple-frame on the third floor and two double-framed windows on the fourth floor) and styled curvilinear windows, based on Manueline elements.

The interior has been substantially altered from its early conceptions, and includes a steep, clear marble staircase with bold lines and contrasting black walls.

== See also ==
- Palazzo dei Diamanti
- José Saramago Foundation
