= Alfredo Holtreman, Viscount of Alvalade =

Portuguese lawyer (1837–1920)

The Right Honourable The Viscount of Alvalade
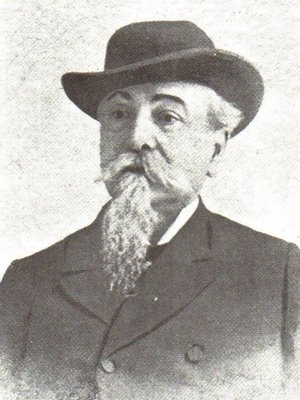
- Alfredo, circa 1890.
- Born: Alfredo Augusto das Neves Holtreman; 6 April 1837; Santarem
- Died: 7 June 1920 (aged 83); Lisbon
- Occupation: Lawyer
- Known for: First Honorary President of Sporting CP
- Spouse: D. Julieta Natalina Luiza Guerin (m. 1859)
- Children: 2
- Family: Holtreman

1st President of Sporting CP
- In office June 1906 – November 1910
- Succeeded by: Caetano Pereira

His Lordship Alfredo Holtreman, Visconde of Alvalade (Alfredo Augusto das Neves Holtreman; 6 April 1837 – 7 June 1920), was a Portuguese aristocrat, lawyer, land tenant, businessman and philanthropist. Alfredo Holtreman wasn’t born into aristocracy. He earned his noble title through merit and service. His reputation and dedication led King D. Carlos to grant him the title of 1st Viscount of Alvalade on 22 July 1898. He was the first president of Sporting CP, from 1906 to 1910, sports club founded in 1906 by his grandson José Alvalade through the Viscount's donation of money and land.

== Parents ==
A male-line descendant of the Holtreman family, he was the son of António Maria Ribeiro da Costa Holtreman, who held a Bachelor of Law degree from the University of Coimbra's Law School, worked as a lawyer in Lisbon, and served as a Member of Parliament, and his wife Libânia Augusta das Neves e Melo.

== History ==
Born in Santarém, Alfredo Holtreman graduated from the University of Coimbra Law School being awarded there a Bachelor of Law degree like his father and also settled in Lisbon since one of the family's farms was in Lumiar, becoming one of the most prestigious lawyers in the Portuguese capital along the way. As a lawyer, he worked for the royal household of the Kingdom of Portugal. In 1859, he married D. Julieta Natalina Luiza Guerin, of whom he had two daughters, one of them mother of José Alfredo Holtreman Roquette (widely known as José Alvalade), future promoter of the birth of Sporting Clube de Portugal (Sporting CP).

On 22 July 1898, he was graced by King D. Carlos with the title of 1st Viscount of Alvalade. He was a very cheerful man who encouraged his grandchildren, whom he liked to see gathered in his mansion, in intense activity with other young people. That was how José remembered his grandfather when he decided to found a great club and asked for money. This one did not hesitate and advanced to him 200,000 reis, making available a piece of land of his farm for the construction of the sporting and social facilities of the new club, that became known as Sítio das Mouras. He was immediately declared a protective partner and was elected the first president of Sporting, functions that would stop on 4 January 1910, happening then to preside to the General Assembly until 28 July 1917.

In 1907, he wrote the first statutes of Sporting CP, being declared Titular Partner of the Club in 1910 and Member of Honor in 1912. By the time he died in 1920 he had already left the Club, discouraged by the premature death of his grandson José Alvalade who had been a victim of the pneumonic epidemic in October 1918.

On 30 June 2017, he was posthumously awarded the Lions Honoris Sporting award in the Honor Class category.

== Personal life ==
=== A secret love and a tense legacy ===
The final chapter of his life revealed a surprising side of his otherwise traditional persona. Well into his old age, he had a relationship with a young maid, which resulted in the birth of a son. Despite the unconventional nature of this relationship in the eyes of Lisbon's aristocracy, the viscount remained closely connected to her throughout his later years. Then, just two weeks before his death in 1920, he married her, officially legitimizing both their bond and the son they shared. This unexpected marriage sent ripples through his family and social circles. By marrying his longtime companion so late in life, the Viscount inadvertently triggered a complex succession crisis. His estate, which included 23 buildings and considerable wealth, became the focus of intense legal disputes. The newly recognized heirs, including the son from this relationship, now had legal standing to claim portions of the inheritance — much to the dismay of established descendants. The conflict dragged on for over a decade, culminating in a Supreme Court decision nearly 15 years after his death. While the episode didn't tarnish his public legacy — especially his role in founding Sporting Portugal — it added a layer of complexity to his biography, often seen as a reflection of a double life: one of rigid public duty and another of deeply human, private choices.

The child remained largely outside the traditional Holtreman-Roquette lineage, which later produced figures like José Roquette (businessman and former chairman of Sporting Portugal), António Luís Roquette Ricciardi (Portuguese navy official turned banker) and José Maria Ricciardi (banker).

=== Exile in London after the fall of the Portuguese monarchy ===
Following the Republican revolution of October 5, 1910, which ended the Portuguese monarchy, Alfredo Holtreman — the Viscount of Alvalade — found himself in a precarious position. As a former legal advisor to the royal household and a prominent figure in aristocratic circles, he was closely associated with the old regime. To avoid political backlash and social unrest, the viscount retreated into exile in London, distancing himself from both public life and the Sporting Clube de Portugal, which he had helped found just a few years earlier. His departure was not widely publicized, but it was seen as a protective move, typical of monarchists who feared persecution under the new Republican government. In London, he lived discreetly, away from the spotlight and the political turbulence unfolding in Portugal. His exile coincided with a growing disinterest in Sporting, especially after the death of his grandson José Alvalade in 1918 due to illness. The viscount’s absence also contributed to family tensions, particularly as his late-life marriage and inheritance disputes began to surface. Though he never returned to public prominence, his legacy endured — both through Sporting Portugal and the historical curiosity surrounding his final years.
