= Pimenta Palace =

- Palácio Pimenta (Portuguese)
- Pimenta Palace
- Interactive map of Pimenta Palace
- 38°45′30.43″N 9°9′24″W
- Location: Lisbon, Portugal

Pimenta Palace (Portuguese: Palácio Pimenta) is an 18th-century Portuguese palace located in Lisbon, Portugal, which hosts the main campus of the Museum of Lisbon.

== History ==
The palace was constructed by order of King John V of Portugal in the mid-18th century for his mistress Paula Teresa da Silva e Almeida, a nun of the Monastery of São Dinis in Odivelas, Portugal.

The Museum of Lisbon was installed in the palace on July 15, 1909, by approval of the Minister of Finances, Tomás António da Guarda Cabreira. Initially installed in City Hall, the museum passed through the Carmo Convent, Mitra Palace, and Galveias Palace until its complete installation in Pimenta Palace in 1979.

== Gallery ==
Palace chapel

Former kitchen

Azulejo panel depicting chinoiserie subjects

Model of Lisbon before the 1755 earthquake

Garden lake with Baroque sculptures of tritons and nereids, commissioned in 1799 and originating from the former Passeio Público

Jardim Bordallo Pinheiro

Ceramic animals after designs by Rafael Bordallo Pinheiro, arranged in 2009 by artist Joana Vasconcelos.

== Sources ==
- Museum of Lisbon (In English)
- Áreas de Actividade (In Portuguese)
