= Campo Grande, Lisbon =

Campo Grande
- Civil parish
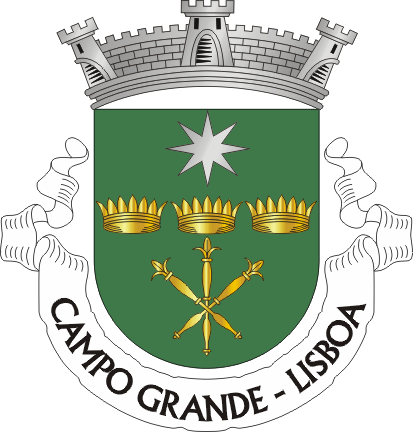
- Coat of arms

- Location in Portugal
- Coordinates: 38°45′10″N 9°09′25″W
- Country: Portugal
- Region: Lisbon
- Metropolitan area: Lisbon
- District: Lisbon
- Municipality: Lisbon
- Disbanded: 2012

Area
  - Total: 2.44 km^{2} (0.94 sq mi)

Population (2009)
  - Total: 9,864
  - Density: 4,000/km^{2} (10,000/sq mi)
- Time zone: UTC+00:00 (WET)
  - Summer (DST): UTC+01:00 (WEST)
- Website: http://www.jf-campogrande.net/

Campo Grande is a neighborhood and former Portuguese civil parish (freguesia) in the municipality of Lisbon. At the administrative reorganization of Lisbon on 8 December 2012 it became part of the parish Alvalade.

== History ==
In the 12th century, the area was a zone of pastures, vineyards, farms and vegetable gardens and marked one of the entrances and exits to the city of Lisbon. A few centuries later, in 1520, the Campo Grande Garden (Jardim do Campo Grande) went from being a strictly rural area to a public space or patio. More than a hundred years later, in 1680, the first garden boulevard was laid out. The Catholic parish of Campo Grande, which has been known since 1602, was known as "The Kings of Alvalade". This name was probably due to the presence of a small hermitage of the Invocation of the Three Holy Kings dating from the 16th century. This hermitage, partially destroyed by the 1755 earthquake, was the starting point for the gathering of small communities around it. After the earthquake, the hermitage was rebuilt in place of the Church of the Holy Magi. Diogo Inácio de Pina Manique, known for his role as Intendant-General of the Police, gave the space a new lease of life with an annual fair, which began in 1778. Still a garden on the outskirts of Lisbon, situated in an eminently rural area, the Campo Grande Garden was seen as a place for the upper classes, who went there to watch and bet on horse races in 1816. Campo Grande only became a civil parish (freguesia) in the municipality of Lisbon in 1885. On the land neighbouring the garden, in the manufacturing boom of the 19th century, a number of industries began to spring up, mainly dedicated to beer, wool, chemicals, diamond cutting and rope making. A well-known example was the Lusitânia woollen factory, opened in 1842, which today houses the Lusófona University. Alfredo Holtreman, Viscount of Alvalade and his family, founders of Sporting Clube de Portugal in 1906, provisionally known as Campo Grande Sporting Club, lived in the area and were owners of several estates there.

== Main institutions ==
- University of Lisbon
- Biblioteca Nacional de Portugal (The National Library)
- Arquivo Nacional da Torre do Tombo (Portugal's national archive)
- Câmara Municipal de Lisboa's Services (Lisbon City Hall's service center)
- Museu da Cidade (Lisbon's City Museum)
- Universidade Lusófona of Lisbon

== Transport ==
The Campo Grande Station of Lisbon Metro operates as an interchange station and is part of a major transport hub of the Greater Lisbon area located in Campo Grande.
