= Fort of Cego =

19th-century fort in Portugal

- Forte do Cego
- Lisbon District, Near Arruda dos Vinhos in Portugal
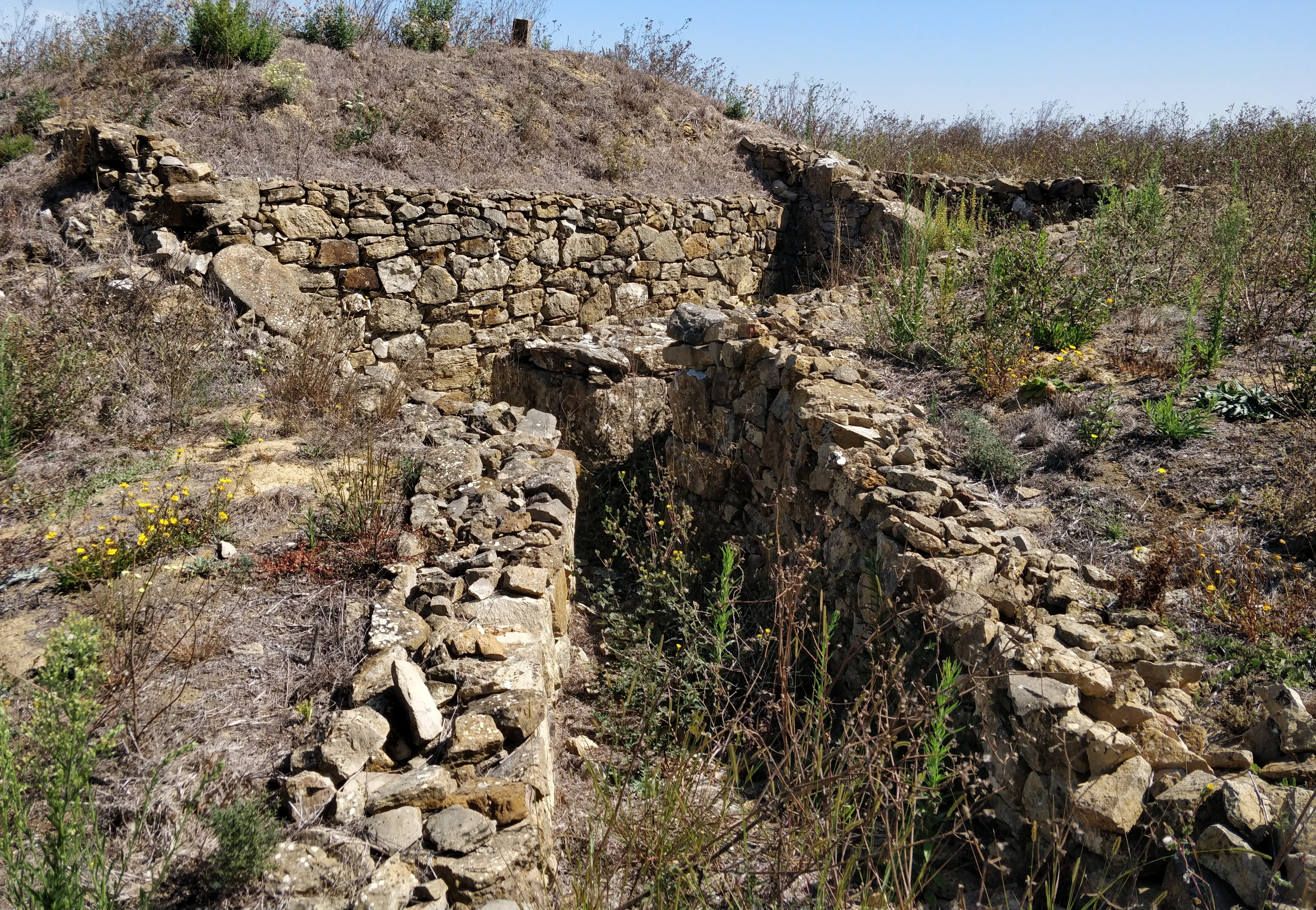

Site information
- Type: Fort
- Open to the public: Yes.
- Condition: Partly restored.

Location
- Coordinates: 38°58′09″N 9°05′09″W

Site history
- Built: 1809-10
- Built by: Duke of Wellington
- Battles/wars: Unused in battle

Garrison information
- Garrison: 280

The Fort of Cego is located in the municipality of Arruda dos Vinhos, in the Lisbon District of Portugal. It is also known as the Fort of Saint Sebastian (Portuguese: Forte de S. Sebastião). The fort was built in 1809-10 as part of the first of the three Lines of Torres Vedras, which were defensive lines to protect the Portuguese capital Lisbon from invasion by the French during the Peninsular War (1807–14) or, in the event of defeat, to safely embark a retreating British Army.

== Background ==
Despite the defeat of French forces in earlier invasions of Portugal during the Peninsular War, the threat of further invasions led the commander of the British troops in Portugal, Arthur Wellesley, 1st Duke of Wellington, to order on October 20, 1809 the construction of defensive lines to the north of the capital, between the Atlantic Ocean and the River Tagus. The Lines of Torres Vedras, consisting of 152 forts, redoubts and other military installations, were built rapidly and in great secrecy, under the overall supervision of Colonel Richard Fletcher who was commander of the Royal Engineers.

== The fort ==
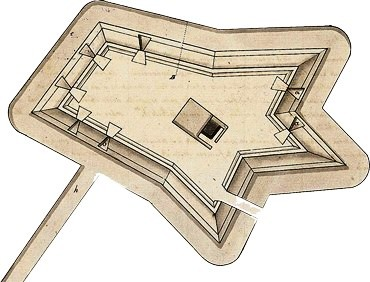
Drawing of the plan of the fort

The Fort of Cego was designated Military Work No. 9 of the 152 works. At 353 metres above sea level, it was on the first, or most northerly, of the three Lines of Torres Vedras, exchanging crossfire with the nearby Fort of Carvalha, with the aim of protecting the Arruda Valley. The fort was designed with an irregular star shape and, among the forts constructed on the Lines, it was notable for having an elaborate drainage system in order to avoid accumulation of water in its interior. Its floor consisted of stones bonded with mortar, while the gun positions also used flagstones. Protection from enemy fire was provided by earth ramparts. It was originally named São Sebastião by the Portuguese Major Brandão de Sousa, but subsequently became known as the Fort of Cego. The fort had a garrison of 280 men, with three nine-pounder cannon.

== Restoration ==
With resources from EEA and Norway Grants, the Fort of Cego was one of the military works of the Lines of Torres Vedras that was restored in 2010 to mark the 200th anniversary of the construction of the Lines. The fort, together with the nearby Fort of Carvalha, can be easily visited. There is also a Lines of Torres Vedras Information Centre in the nearby town of Arruda dos Vinhos.

== See also ==
- List of forts of the Lines of Torres Vedras
