= Dinis Vital =

Portuguese footballer

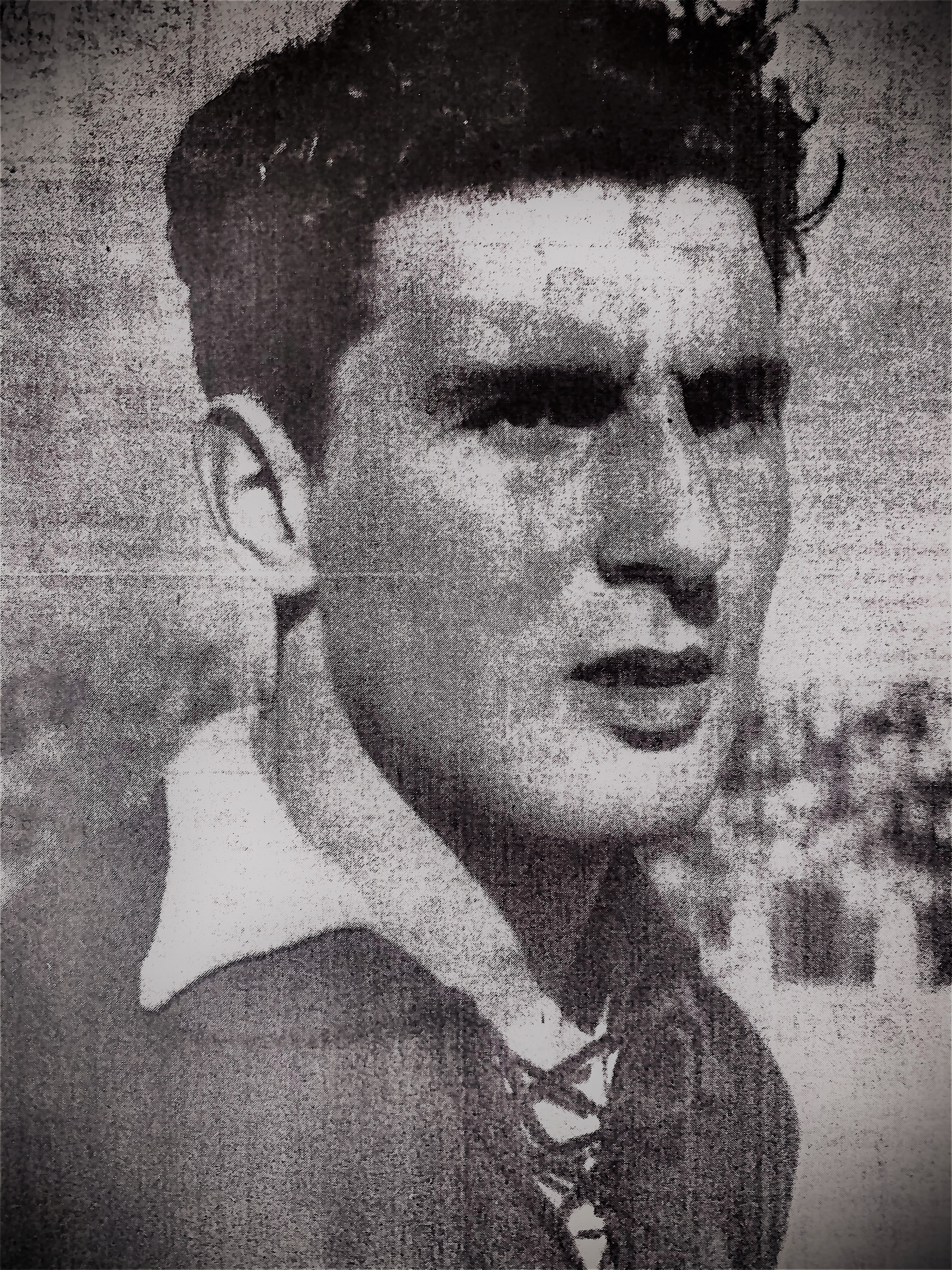

Personal information
- Full name: Dinis Martins Vital
- Date of birth: 2 July 1932
- Place of birth: Grândola, Portugal
- Date of death: 17 September 2014 (aged 82)
- Place of death: Évora, Portugal
- Position: Goalkeeper

Youth career
- 1949–1950: Desp. Grandolense

Senior career*
Years	Team	Apps	(Gls)
1950–1951	Desp. Grandolense		
1951–1966	Lusitano Évora	361	(1)
1966–1970	Vitória Setúbal	100	(0)
1970–1971	Juventude Évora		
1971–1974	Grupo União Sport		
1974–1975	Juventude Évora		

International career
	Portugal B	1	(0)
1959	Portugal	1	(0)

Managerial career
- 1970–1971: Juventude Évora
- 1971–1974: Grupo União Sport
- 1974–1975: Juventude Évora
- 1975–1976: Lusitano Évora
- 1976–1977: Atl. Reguengos
- 1977–1978: Grupo União Sport
- 1979–1981: Juventude Évora
- 1981–1982: Alcobaça
- 1982–1983: Lusitano Évora
- 1984–1985: Juventude Évora
- 1985–1986: Farense
- 1987–1989: Juventude Évora
- 1989–1990: Vasco da Gama Sines
- 1990–1992: Lusitano Évora
- 1992–1993: «O Grandolense»
- 2000–2002: Lusitano Évora
- * Club domestic league appearances and goals

Dinis Martins Vital (2 July 1932 – 17 September 2014) was a Portuguese footballer who played as goalkeeper.

Vital gained 1 cap for Portugal against Switzerland 16 May 1959 in Geneva, in a 3–4 defeat.

He is the 4th player with most games played in the Portuguese League only behind João Vieira Pinto, António Sousa and Manuel Fernandes.

Vital died on the 17 September 2014 at the age of 82 in Évora.

== Honours ==
=== Player ===
Vitória Setúbal

- Taça de Portugal: 1966–67; runner-up: 1967–68
