= Fort of Carvalha =

19th-century fort in Portugal

- Forte da Carvalha
- Lisbon District, Near Arruda dos Vinhos in Portugal
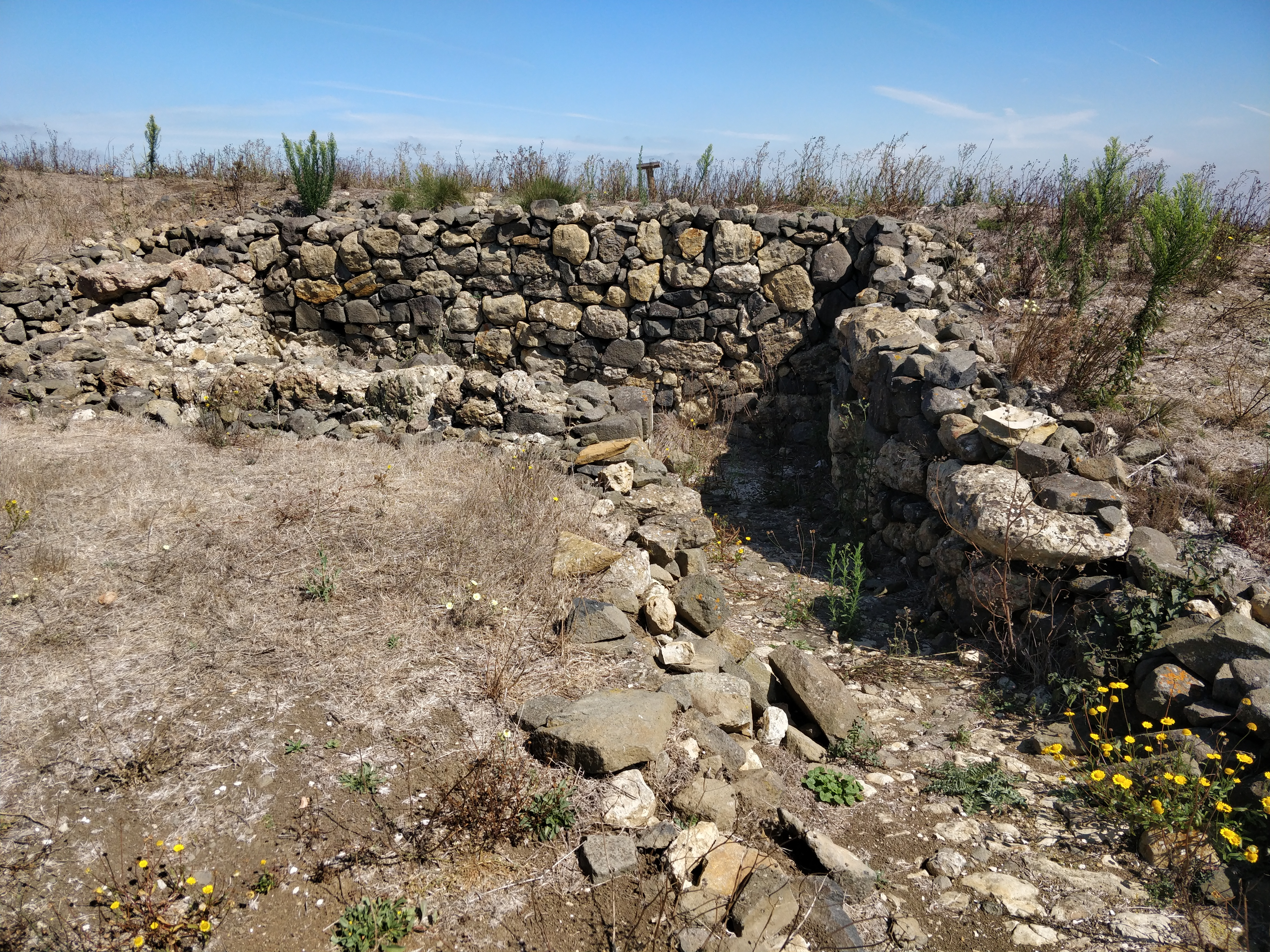

Site information
- Type: Fort
- Open to the public: Yes.
- Condition: Partly restored.

Location
- Coordinates: 38°58′22″N 9°06′13″W

Site history
- Built: 1809-10
- Built by: Duke of Wellington
- Battles/wars: Unused in battle

Garrison information
- Garrison: 400

The Fort of Carvalha is located in the parish of São Tiago dos Velhos, at the highest point of the municipality of Arruda dos Vinhos, in the Lisbon District of Portugal. It was built in 1809-10 as part of the first of the three Lines of Torres Vedras, which were defensive lines to protect the Portuguese capital Lisbon from invasion by the French during the Peninsular War (1807–14) or, in the event of defeat, to safely embark a retreating British Army.

== Background ==
Following the Treaty of Fontainebleau signed between France and Spain in October 1807, which agreed on the invasion of Portugal, French troops under the command of General Junot entered the country, which requested support from the British. In July 1808 troops commanded by Arthur Wellesley, 1st Duke of Wellington landed in Portugal and defeated French troops at the Battles of Roliça and Vimeiro. This forced Junot to negotiate the Convention of Cintra, which led to the evacuation of the French army from Portugal. In March 1809, Marshal Soult led a new French expedition that advanced south to the city of Porto before being repulsed by Portuguese-British troops and forced to withdraw. However, the threat of further invasions by the French led Wellington, on October 20, 1809, to order the construction of defensive lines to the north of the capital, between the Atlantic Ocean and the River Tagus. The Lines of Torres Vedras, consisting of 152 forts, redoubts and other military installations, were built rapidly and in conditions of great secrecy, under the overall supervision of Colonel Richard Fletcher who was commander of the Royal Engineers.

== The fort ==
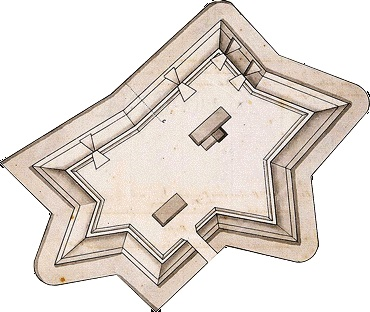
Drawing of the plan of the fort

The Fort of Carvalha was designated Military Work No. 10 of the 152 works. It was on the first, or most northerly, of the three lines, exchanging crossfire with the nearby Fort of Cego, and had the responsibility of protecting the Arruda Valley against French incursion. Constructed with an irregular star shape, it is situated at an altitude of 394 metres and was named “Carvalha” by the Portuguese Major Brandão de Sousa, after the hill of the same name. It was garrisoned with 400 men and had four cannon.

== Restoration ==
With resources from EEA and Norway Grants, the Fort of Carvalha was one of the military works of the Lines of Torres Vedras that was restored in 2010 to mark the 200th anniversary of the construction of the Lines. Restoration work began on 19 April 2010. The fort can now be visited.

== See also ==
- List of forts of the Lines of Torres Vedras
