= Filipe Semedo =

Portuguese footballer (born 2000)

Personal information
- Full name: Filipe Semedo Rodrigues
- Date of birth: 22 January 2000 (age 26)
- Place of birth: Cascais, Portugal
- Height: 1.90 m (6 ft 3 in)
- Position: Goalkeeper

Team information
- Current team: Juventude Évora
- Number: 22

Youth career
- 2009–2010: Etoril AC
- 2010–2019: Sporting

Senior career*
Years	Team	Apps	(Gls)
2019–2020	Vilafranquense	0	(0)
2020–2021	União Leiria	1	(0)
2021–2022	Ideal	17	(0)
2022–2023	Lusitano Évora	23	(0)
2023–	Juventude Évora	13	(0)
- * Club domestic league appearances and goals as of 15:42, 28 December 2023 (UTC)

Filipe Semedo Rodrigues (born 22 January 2000) is a Portuguese professional footballer who plays as a goalkeeper for Juventude Évora.

== Football career ==
He made his Taça da Liga debut for Vilafranquense on 28 July 2019 in a game against Casa Pia.
