= Alhinho =

Alhinho is a Portuguese surname. Notable people with the surname include:

- Alexandre Alhinho (born 1953), Cape Verdean footballer and manager
- Carlos Alhinho (1949–2008), Portuguese footballer and manager
- Valdo Alhinho (born 1988), Angolan footballer
