= José Pedro Biléu =

Portuguese footballer

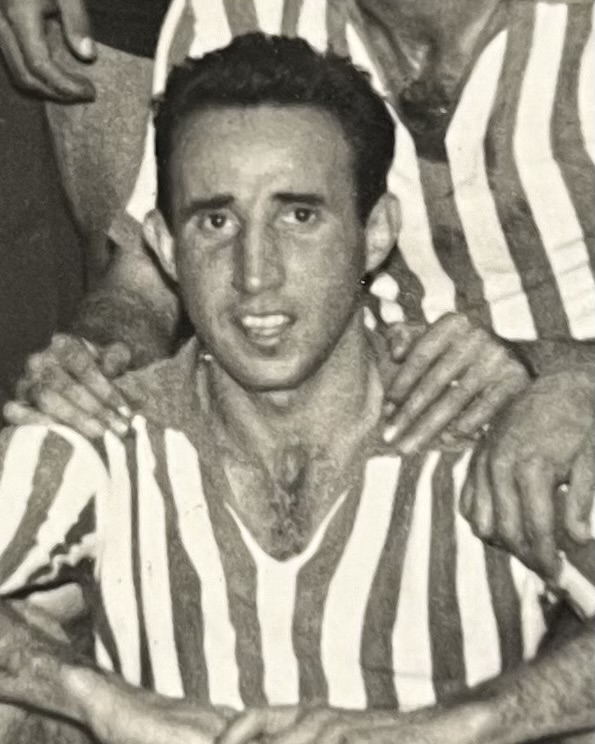

Personal information
- Date of birth: 10 April 1932
- Place of birth: Mora, Portugal
- Date of death: 9 April 2016 (aged 83)
- Place of death: Mora, Portugal
- Position: Forward

Senior career*
| Years | Team | Apps | (Gls) |
| 1950-1952 | Luso Morense | | |
| 1952-1967 | Lusitano de Évora | 389 | (136) |
| 1967-1972 | Juventude de Évora | | |

International career
| 1955–1956 | Portugal | 2 | (0) |
- * Club domestic league appearances and goals

José Pedro Biléu (10 April 1932 – 9 April 2016) was a Portuguese footballer who played as forward.

== Football career ==
José Pedro started playing for his local team Luso Morense in 1950. The team did well in the regional league and third division in the 1950/51 and 1951/52 seasons catching the eye of local giants Lusitano Évora who had recently been promoted to the Portuguese First Division. José Pedro would become the most prolific goalscoarer in the history of Lusitano, scoring 136 official goals in 15 seasons between the First and Second Division as well as Cup.

At the age of 37, José Pedro moved to Lusitano’s rival in Évora, Juventude, who were playing in the Third Division at the time. José Pedro played for the blue eagles for four seasons more before retiring at the age of 40.

== International career ==
Biléu gained 2 caps for Portugal and made his debut 22 May 1955 in Porto against England, in a 3-1 win.

== Death ==
José Pedro Biléu died on 9 April 2016 in Mora, at the age of 83.
