= Arranhó =

- Civil parish
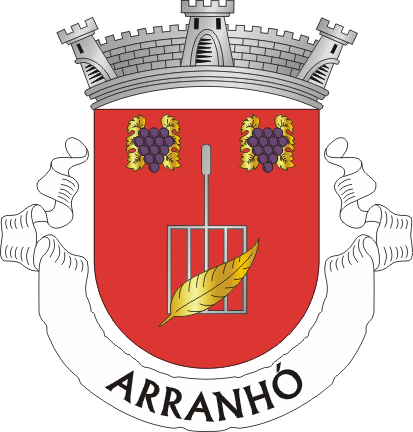
- Coat of arms

- Location in Portugal
- Coordinates: 38.953°N 9.134°W
- Country: Portugal
- Region: Oeste e Vale do Tejo
- Intermunic. comm.: Oeste
- District: Lisbon
- Municipality: Arruda dos Vinhos

Area
  - Total: 21.47 km^{2} (8.29 sq mi)

Population (2011)
  - Total: 2,531
  - Density: 117.9/km^{2} (305.3/sq mi)
- Time zone: UTC+00:00 (WET)
  - Summer (DST): UTC+01:00 (WEST)

Arranhó (European Portuguese: [ɐʁɐˈɲɔ]) is a civil parish in the municipality of Arruda dos Vinhos, Portugal. The population in 2011 was 2,531, in an area of 21.47 km^{2} (8.29 sq mi).
