= Lusitano G.C. =

Sports club in Portugal

Lusitano de Évora
- Full name: Lusitano Ginásio Clube
- Nicknames: Eborenses (Eborians); Verde e Brancos (The Green-and-Whites); Erbanários (Herbalists) Lusitanistas (Lusitanists)
- Founded: 11 November 1911; 115 years ago
- Ground: Campo Estrela
- Capacity: 4,000
- Chairman: Pedro Caldeira
- Manager: Pedro Russiano
- League: Liga 3
- 2024–25: Campeonato de Portugal, Group D Champions
Home colours	Away colours

Lusitano Ginásio Clube, MHC, also commonly known as Lusitano de Évora (abbrev. Lusit. Évora), is a Portuguese sports club based in Évora competing in the Liga 3, the third-tier league in the Portuguese football system. Founded on 11 November 1911 by a group of high school and commercial school youngsters in the house of professor Dâmaso Simões at Rua das Fontes, No. 3 in Évora as Lusitano Académico, it subsequently became Lusitano Futebol and finally Lusitano Ginásio Clube in 1925. The club's home ground is the Campo Estrela in Évora, purchased in 1931.

Lusitano entered the 1952–53 Primeira Divisão, finishing up 7th in their first season ever. The club competed for 14 consecutive seasons in the Primeira Divisão, its major period of success in the 1950s and 1960s, earning an honorable 5th place in 1956/57, and reaching the semi-finals of the Taça de Portugal twice. After relegation in 1966 the club went through a period of decline, never regaining access to the Portuguese top flight ever again and even descending to regional championships. The club is still today in the top teams with the most presences in the Portuguese League and the 14th with more consecutive presences.

Recently the club became nacional champions by winning the Campeonato de Portugal, in a final held at the National Stadium in June 2025.

== History ==
The name "Lusitano" is derived from Lusitania, the Roman name for the Roman province corresponding to the current territory of Portugal south of the Douro river plus the modern-day Spanish region of Extremadura, and it is a generally accepted synonym of Portuguese. The Lusitanians (Lusitanos in Portuguese language) was the people of Lusitania.

=== Motto ===
The club's motto is Fazer Forte Fraca Gente (Portuguese for Making the Weak Stronger).

=== Foundation ===
The club was founded 11 November 1911 (11-11-1911 in a sport played with 11 players). In addition, its first headquarters was in Travessa da Bola No. 11, in Évora.

=== Anthem ===
The club's anthem was composed by poet Celestino David in 1926

Camaradas da luta e do sonho

Companheiros no mesmo ideal

Entoemos um canto risonho

Que levante, a cantar, Portugal

Exaltemos a força que dá

A alegria, a saúde, o valor...

Pois com eles um dia virá

Outra vida, outro sol, outro amor

Sem intuitos de guerras e lida

Em batalhas que o ódio revela

Recordemos as forças e a vida

Num anseio de vidas mais belas

=== First victories ===
In 1917/18 Lusitano won its first Evora FA championship. It would win many district championships afterwards (1921/22, 1922/23, 1926/27, 1927/28, 1928/29. 1930/31, 1932/33, 1933/34, 1934/35, 1939/40, 1940/41).

The year 1925 proved decisive for the future of the club. At the initiative of historical leaders such as José Benchimol, Napoleão Palma, Alberto da Conceição and António Prazeres, the club was restructured, the facilities were reorganized and its action extended to other modalities, with emphasis on gymnastics that would reach great projection. Lusitano started investing on a concept of full personal development, involving the man and the athlete, a design that would be the hallmark of all those who have passed through their teams over the years.

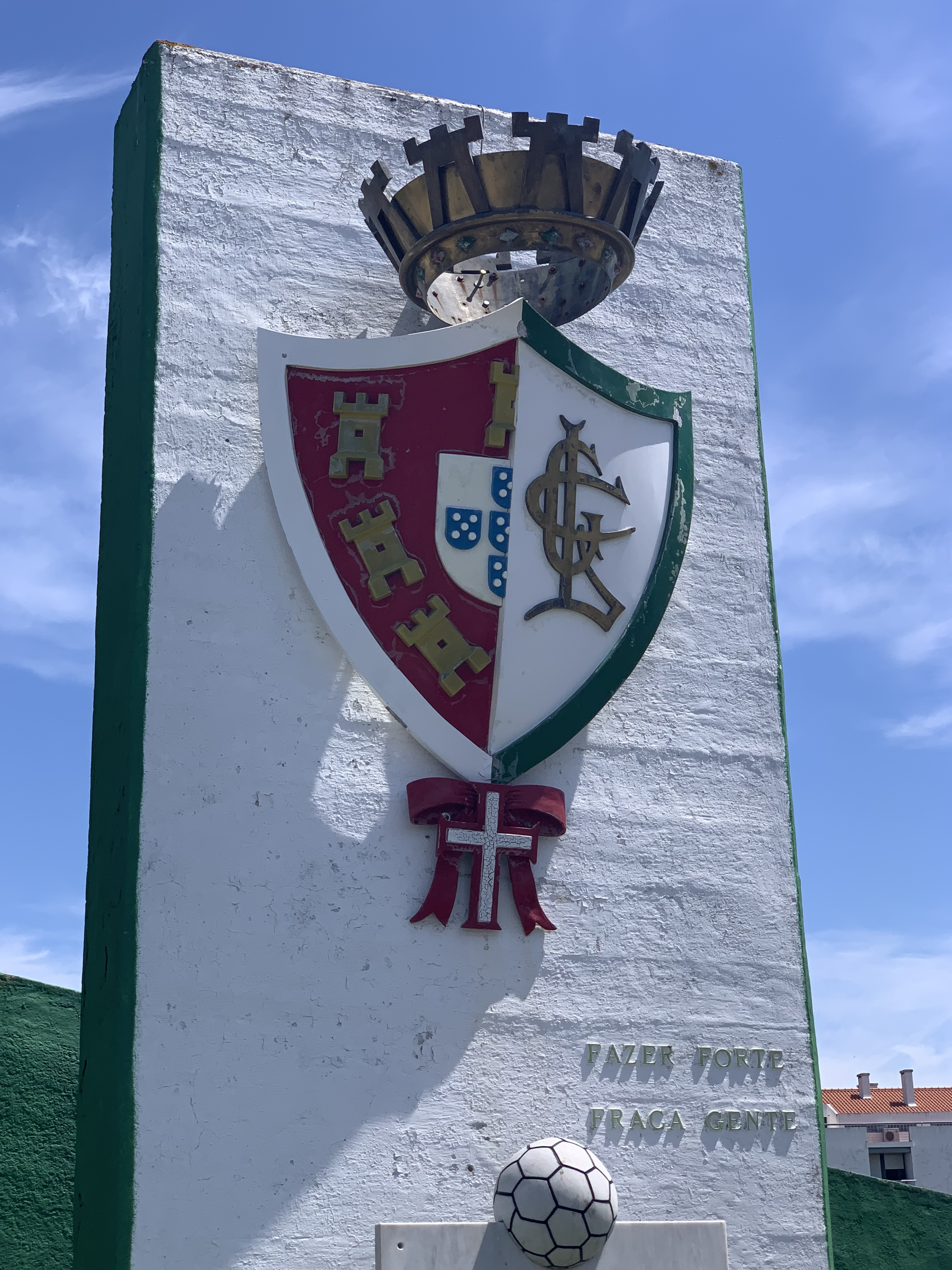
Lusitano crest at Campo Estrela 2020

Between 1929/30 and 1933/34 the Eborians competed in the Campeonato de Portugal, without recording significant results. The club obtained its best classification in 1930/31, reaching the quarter-finals lost to Benfica.

In 1931 the mythical Campo Estrela was purchased. On 6 November 1932, Lusitano beat Benfica 4–1 in Evora in a friendly match. Between 1934/35 and 1937/38 the club was one of the forerunners of the League Championship of the Second Division. In the 1938/39 season the Portuguese Championship was renamed Taça de Portugal (TP) and the 2nd Division championship was created.

=== The golden age ===
In 1951/52 Lusitano became National Champion of the Segunda Divisão, after winning the final pool of the competition with Vitória de Setúbal, Torreense and U. de Coimbra. It was a sublime moment in the history of the club. The last game, refereed by António Calheiros, took place in Campo Estrela on 6 January 1952 and ended with a 0–0 draw between Eborians and Sadinos. Lusitano lined-up with the following roster: Dinis Vital; Eduardo and Soeiro; Madeira, Valle and Paulo; Pepe, Di Paola, Teixeira da Silva, Duarte and Domingo. The entrance of the club in the greater division of Portuguese football was commemorated all around the city. The famous Praça do Geraldo received countless expressions of joy. Évora entered the map of Portuguese football. The winning coach, was former Lazio and Banfield player Anselmo Pisa. On 28 September 1952 Dinis Vital, Soeiro, Paixão, Madeira, Valle, Paulo, Flora, Di Paola, Patalino, Batalha and Duarte debuted in the competition. In the 1952/53 season Lusitano achieved a record that was only beaten the by Famalicão in the 2019/2020 season, i.e., never a newly promoted team was leading the table by the 5th matchday. Also in 1952 the Players Statute was approved. The document contained the rights and duties of the players, defined the prizes policy and praised correctness, loyalty and fair play. Also in the Taça de Portugal the club surprised, by eliminating Sporting in the quarter-finals. A 3–3 draw in 1953/54, in Évora, against Sporting and the victory against Porto by 2-0 encouraged leaders and supporters. In the 1954/55 season, already under the command of Cândido Tavares, the club finished 10th place in the Primeira Divisão, having beaten Sporting 2–1. Also FC Porto with Barrigana, Hernâni and Pedroto would crash in Campo Estrela 2–1. "Porto scored first yesterday in Évora - but did not escape defeat ..." - titled A Bola. In the Taça de Portugal, wins 2–1 against V. de Guimarães and 2–0 against FC Porto. In 1955/56, Lusitano finished 8th. Under the guidance of Severiano Correia, the base team included Dinis Vital, Polido, Paixão, José da Costa, Falé, Vicente, Batalha, Vieira, Patalino, Caraça and José Pedro. Special highlight for the 1–1 draw against Sporting in Évora, in a game that inaugurated the new pitch of Campo Estrela. In the Estádio da Luz a 1–1 draw against Benfica.

In the 1956/57 season, led by Otto Bumbel, the club achieved its best performance in the biggest event of Portuguese football, reaching an exceptional 5th place. Won 13 out of 26 matches and recorded impressive results during the competition: wins in Evora by 3–2 against Porto (Flora hat-trick) and 2–1 against Sporting, as well as 1-1 draws in Estádio José Alvalade and 2 -2 at the Estádio da Luz. In the 1957/58 season, already under the guidance of Lorenzo Ausina, Lusitano obtained a resounding victory against Benfica by 4–0, in the 8th matchday, at Campo Estrela. In 1958/59, high note for the draws 0-0 and 3–3 at Campo Estrela, against Benfica and Sporting, respectively and return to the Cup semi-finals (eliminated by FC Porto). Otto Bumbel returned to the club in 61/62, but the league streak confirmed the downward trend (12th place with 20 pts). Highlight, in any case, for another victory against Sporting, in the knockout round of the Cup (4–1). Already under the command of Josef Fabian, in 1962/63 Lusitano obtained an honorable 7th place with 23 points. In terms of Taça de Portugal the club obtained its biggest victory so far in official games, beating Portalegrense, in the first round, in Evora, 10–0.

Lusitano said goodbye to the 1st Division, accompanied by Barreirense, finishing 13th, with only 14 pts, losing 16 of the 26 games played.

They had 14 consecutive seasons in which Évora was at the center of the great decisions of national football, mobilizing crowds whenever the big teams, would come to play at the Museum City. The roads were embellished and all paths converged towards the Campo Estrela. The pilgrimage was indescribable.

It was in this period for Portuguese football that Sporting won the 1963–64 Cup Winners Cup, that Benfica reached its apogee in Europe with the double victory in the European Champion Clubs' Cup (1960/61 and 1961/62) and that the national team reached its best classification ever in a FIFA World Cup (3rd place in 1966 World Cup).

=== The 70s in the Second Division ===
Lusitano spent the rest of the 1960s in the Segunda Divisão until relegation to the third tier by the end of the 1969/70 season when due to financial difficulties the clube took the path of non-professionalism. A period of several promotions and relegations between the third and second division followed without really contending access back to the top tier.

In this period Lusitano were vice-champions of the Third Division in the 1972/73 season, losing the final to Lourosa (0–1).

=== Almost back in the 80s ===
In the 1979/80 season Lusitano had a great season in the Segunda Divisão fighting shoulder to shoulder with Amora FC coached by José Mourinho's father Mourinho Félix and overcoming clubs such as Farense, Estrela da Amadora, Nacional, Barreirense and rivals Juventude. Lusitano started the season with a loss and two draws (including a 0–0 draw against eventual winners Amora FC). However wins against Sacavenense, Nacional and Estrela da Amadora as well as away draws against Farense and Fabril boosted the team a great second round of the season. Amora FC eventually gained direct promotion by finishing 1st and actually became Segunda Divisão champions, while Lusitano had to enter the promotion play-offs against Central and North zones runners-up Académico de Viseu and Fafe. Lusitano lost both matches against Académico de Viseu and the match in Fafe, thereby failing promotion back to the Primeira Divisão.

After a 9th place the following season (in which rivals Juventude nearly got promotion to the Primeira Divisão) and a 3rd place in 1981/82 (only behind Marítimo and Farense) Lusitano announced that Dinis Vital, former captain and the club's main symbol would be appointed as manager for the 1982/83 season. Vital had nearly taken rivals Juventude to the Primeira Divisão in 1981 and took Ginásio de Alcobaça to their only top tier presence in 1982. Vital left Ginásio de Alcobaça in the first division and returned to the club.

The season did not seem easy with former Portuguese champions Belenenses (playing in the second division for the first time in history) Farense, Olhanense, Nacional, União da Madeira, Barreirense, Atlético and Juventude. However Lusitano had an amazing season, actually beating Belenenses (1–0) in the Campo Estrela and losing only twice in Évora against Farense and Nacional. However, Lusitano struggled with difficulties in away matches, winning only twice. Farense, coached by Hristo Mladenov won the series and gained direct promotion to the top tier, in addition to becoming Segunda Divisão champions, while Lusitano had to face the play-offs once again. This time the opponents were Sporting de Espinho, Vizela and another historic club Académica de Coimbra. Notwithstanding a Lusitano victory in Coimbra (1–2), Sporting de Espinho with former Benfica striker Moínhos was too strong winning both matches against the Eborians and gaining access to Primeira Divisao via play-off.

Dinis Vital left the club in the end of the season. He would still gain Farense's promotion in 1986, the year Lusitano was relegated to the third division. The club never again had real a fighting chance to return to the top flight.

=== Wandering in the lower leagues ===
By 1990 Lusitano was playing the Segunda Divisão once again, when the FPF announced its intention to extinguish this competition and replace it with two new ones. The Segunda Liga (Divisão de Honra) with no regional separation (second tier) and a II Division B (third tier) with a North, Central and South zones. Teams finishing in the top 7 in three zones of the Segunda Divisão in 1990 would either obtain: (a) direct promotion to top tier (1st place), (b) access to the promotion playoffs (2nd place) or (c) access to the new Divisão de Honra. Lusitano finished 12th and therefore was allocated to the also newly created II Division B (third tier), where it remained until 1995 (with a brief participation in the Third Division). However, the Third Division would be the club's destiny for the second half of the nineties.

The club won the III Division, Series F in the 1993/94 season, as well as the Second Stage, losing the national finals to Liminanos ans thus becoming III Division Vice-Champions.

The 2000/2001 Promotion to the II Division B put the club in severe economic difficulties. Also due to a disastrous political option by the FPF. According to the regulations all the teams from Madeira and Azores were automatically allocated to the Southern series of the II B and Third Division. This would mean that rich clubs in the North and Centre of Portugal would only need to travel a few kilometers to play, poor teams from the South were forced to exhausting and expensive flights to the islands constantly throughout the mid-1990s and 2000s.

=== Regional league, decline and insolvency ===
Lusitano spent its 100th birthday with no professional football team registered.

The club was suspended in the 2011–12 season from entering any tier in the Portuguese football pyramid. In 2012–13 they were allowed to start over in the Évora District League Divisão de Honra Série A (regional second division, fifth division overall).

=== The failed 2016-2021 SAD project and division of the club ===
On 14 July 2016, the Lusitano Ginásio Clube, Futebol SAD (Sports Company) was created and the Portuguese entrepreneur Nuno Madeira Rodrigues took on the role of president of the board of directors of the newly incorporated SAD. The club transferred the management of professional senior football rights to this newly created entity. The main goal was to bring Lusitano back to the big stage once again.

After rebirth the club has mostly competed in the regional leagues until promotion to the Campeonato de Portugal by the end of the 2018/19 season. After the return of professional football in 2013, and especially since the incorporation of the SAD, Lusitano were Évora FA Champions in 2018/19, won the Évora FA Cup three times in a row 2016, 2017 and 2018, as well as the Évora FA Super Cup 2017 and 2019.

However, after promotion to the third tier at the end of the 2018/2019 season, the club accused the SAD of abandoning the team throughout the season and thus the merit belonged to the club staff. This led to a separation. Lusitano SAD would keep the professional team, most of the sponsors, the access to the Silveirinha Sports Complex and would participate in the Campeonato de Portugal and, on the other hand, a newly created Associação Lusitano de Évora 1911 would keep the Campo Estrela, the youth teams, the amateur sports and would compete in the EVORA FA second-tier league.

On 8 April 2019 due to the COVID-19 pandemic situation, the Portuguese FA cancelled the 2019/20 season of the Campeonato de Portugal. Therefore, there were nor promotions or relegations. Lusitano thus earned the right to remain in this league. The FA also announced the creation of a new third tier in 2021/2022 below the professional 1st and 2nd tier called Liga 3. The Campeonato de Portugal will thus become the fourth tier above regional leagues.

In June 2020, Lusitano Ginásio Clube, Futebol, SAD announced that it had reached an agreement with Nigerian entrepreneur Dorothy Nneka Ede, such agreement focusing on a new investment into the club targeting a promotion to higher tiers of Portuguese championships, combined with a total revamp of the Silveirinha infrastructures and the creation of a U-23 team which will serve as nursery for young national and international talents. However, after disagreements with the owners of the SAD, the board of directors and Nuno Madeira Rodrigues have resigned. Following the resignation of the Board, Lusitano SAD was not able to secure permanence in the Campeonato de Portugal and was relegated to the regional league, where they were set to compete against the Associação Lusitano de Évora 1911. Notwithstanding, the new owners were also unable to register players with the Evora FA for the 2021/2022 season, and also claimed to no longer have access to the Silveirinha Sports Complex. The project of the SAD was dead, five years after its inception.

=== The Rebirth ===
Lusitano started competing in the 2021/2022 season with a clear and assumed will to return to national football and with a team made of youngsters from the club's youth system, led by Nelson Valente and with new Chairman Pedro Caldeira, a former athlete of the club, promotion from the regional League was celebrated in Évora at the end of the 2022/23 season, winning Regional League, Cup and Super Cup.

To contest the Campeonato de Portugal, the first semi-professional tier in Portugal (4th League), manager João Nivea was appointed, and the coach from Ponte de Sôr who was given the responsibility of stabilizing the club on this tier almost lead the club to the Liga 3, by qualifying to the final four of the South Zone, after making second place in the regular season. However, the playoffs did not go well for Nívea and the team only obtained one point in six matches. The following season expectations were high, and the team was reinforced with new talented players such as Marcelo Valverde, Cassiano Borges, Johnson Juah and Sele Davou. However, the team made only third place, failing to qualify for the playoffs. An excessive number of draws was principally the reason as the club conceded merely 9 goals in 28 official matches, a European record for the season.

In 2024 the club and João Nivea decided not to continue their work relationship and Pedro Russiano was appointed as new manager for the 2024/25 season where the club assumed its express intention to obtain promotion to Liga 3.

=== Champions of Portugal 2024 ===
For his third campaign in the Campeonato de Portugal, club president Pedro Caldeira adopted an ambitious tone when presenting the new manager, Pedro Russiano, stating that the club’s ultimate objective was to reach the competition’s final stage and secure promotion to Liga 3.

Lusitano were hugely dominant in their group, winning it comfortably and finishing with both the best attack and the best defence. Particularly impressive were the performances of João Pinto, Miguel Lopes, Cassiano, Martim Águas and Mauro Andrade.

In the final stage, their dominance was even more emphatic, with the club winning all six matches played, securing promotion to Liga 3 in Fátima as early as the fifth matchday and also qualifying for the Campeonato de Portugal grand final at the Estádio do Jamor.

In the final, played on 14 June 2024, Lusitano won the second national title in the club’s history, defeating Vitória SC (B) on penalties after a 1–1 draw in regulation time. Young goalkeeper Duarte Martins stopped 2 penalties. It was yet another moment of jubilation, with thousands of supporters welcoming the team back to Évora in front of the City Hall.

That season, Lusitano also enjoyed a remarkable run in the Taça de Portugal, eliminating one Liga 2 side (Académico de Viseu) and two Primeira Liga teams (Estoril and AFS), before being knocked out by Braga at the Pedreira in the round of 16.

== Stadiums ==
=== Campo Estrela ===
The Campo Estrela was inaugurated June 15, 1914. It is the third oldest football pitch in the country still existing, only surpassed by the Bessa (1911) and the Campo da Constituição (1912) both in Oporto.

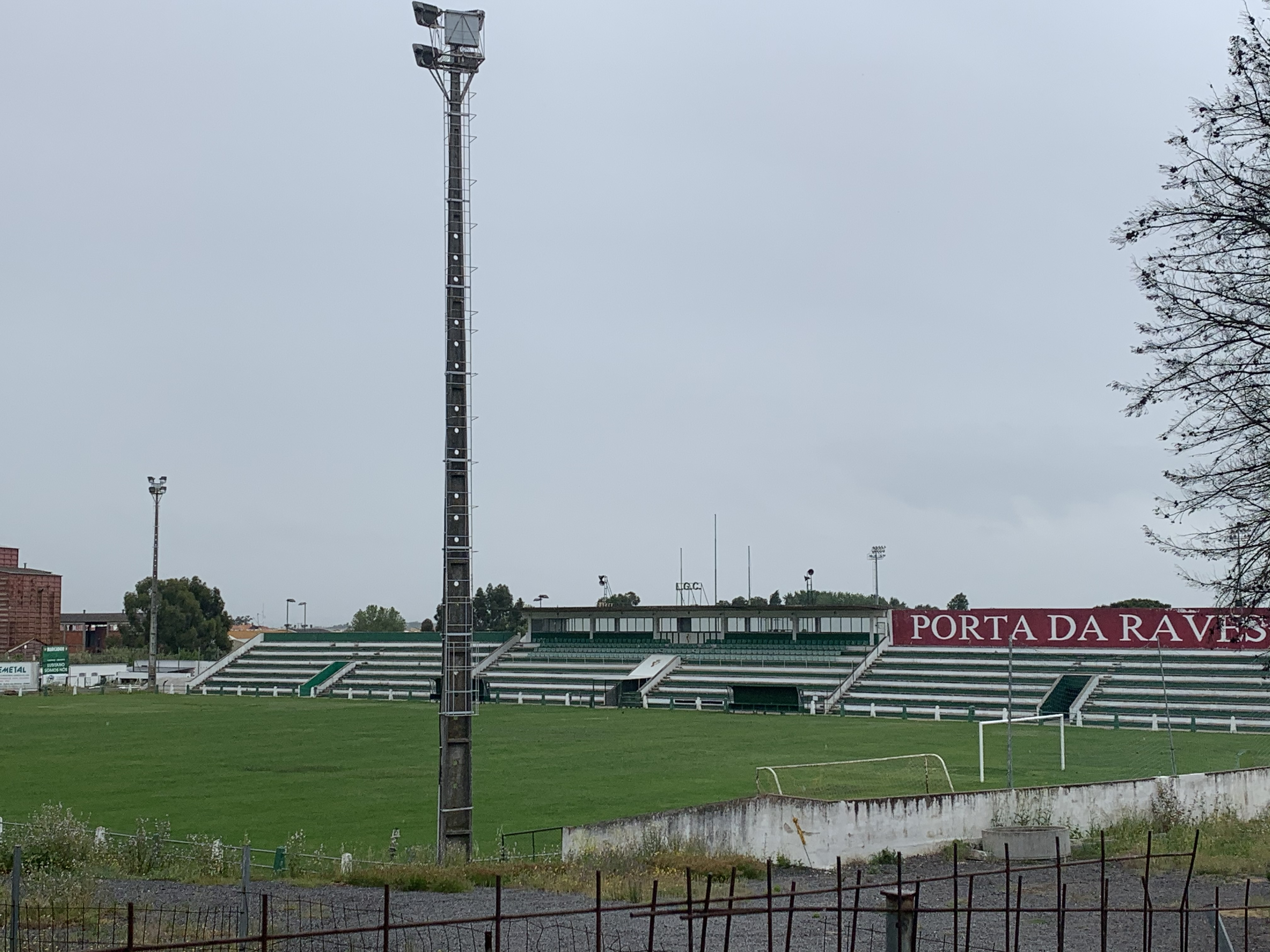

The stadium is a landmark of Évora and contrarily to popular belief not only associated with Lusitano. The genesis of its construction is umbilically linked to the outbreak of sport in the city and was the first permanent site dedicated to the practice of athletic sports, as it was called. The construction initiative came from the Ateneu Sport Eborense, founded 15 June 1913 by a group of athletes who had left Sport Vitória Académico and who leased the site for fifteen years to install a football and athletics facility (to a lesser extent shooting and equestrianism). Over the years football clearly surpassed all other sports. In 1922 the Ateneu folded and its president, Emídio Crujeira de Carvalho, handed over all its assets and sports equipment to Lusitano, thereby terminating the lease. In 1926 the site was leased by another club, the Ginásio Club Eborense and suffered some abandonment. This club also folded 2 years later and Lusitano started leasing the Campo Estrela for its participation in the Campeonato de Portugal.

In 1931, former president and lawyer Mário Ribeiro de Lemos planned an operation for the purchase of the Campo Estrela for 30,000 PTE. The money came directly from the pocket of Mário Ribeiro de Lemos and as soon as the public deed was executed on 3 February 1931, recovery, enlargement and improvement works started immediately over four years. In 1935 it was completely unrecognizable. The pitch was excellent and two locker rooms had been built, with 4 showers each, and a third on for the referees to be isolated from the players. A national innovation. There was a storage room to store various materials. Six rows of wooden benches with a capacity of more than 300 people in a length of more than 60 meters, which were completed by structures for the opening of 18 cabins. It was by far the best field in the Alentejo and one of the best in Portugal.

Campo Estrela also knew its golden period during the 14 years in which Lusitano remained in the I Division (1952–1966). At the end of 1953 the wooden benches were destroyed and replaced by stone ones, stretched out to the length of the field and comfortable cabins were installed. In addition to the improvements a complete medical station and excellent sanitary facilities for dames and gentlemen were also available.

On 25 May 1955, the grass pitch was opened in a league match against Sporting (1-1-draw). Évora became the 5th city in the country to have a grass field after Lisbon (National Stadium, Estádio José Alvalade, Estádio da Luz, Campo das Salésias), Porto (Estádio das Antas and Estádio do Lima), Coimbra and Braga. Lusitano was also the fifth club to have a grass pitch, given that the National Stadium and the 28 de Maio Stadium were State-owned.

On 4 April 1956, the Campo Estrela saw its first international matches by welcoming the 2nd. day of the NATO International Tournament receiving the matches between Italy and Turkey and between Portugal and Egypt. The other two days were disputed in Lisbon and in Porto. The following year two English lady's teams came to Portugal to present the practice of football among ladies which was taking its first steps abroad. Again Lisbon, Porto and Évora were the chosen cities.

In 1964 a mysterious virus destroyed the grass entirely.

=== Silveirinha Sports Complex ===
Lusitano was supposed to start playing their home matches at the Complexo Desportivo da Silveirinha which was built in 2006 and is able to hold a seating capacity of 4,000. Construction started 7 February 2006 and was accelerated due to Luiz Felipe Scolari's intention to prepare Portugal for the upcoming 2006 FIFA World Cup in the city of Évora. The existing grounds were old and not suitable for training and holding a friendly match against Cape Verde, so there was a project to abandon the Campo Estrela which would be demolished and Lusitano would start using the Silveirinha complex after the departure of the Portugal national football team.

On the 27 May 2006, Complexo Desportivo da Silveirinha hosted an international friendly match between Portugal and Cape Verde in preparation for Portugal participating in the 2006 FIFA World Cup in which Portugal won 4–1. This was the only time an international football match was played in Évora. The Complex had two movable stands installed for that specific match.

However, serious financial difficulties by the club led to an insolvency proceeding which resulted in the abandonment of the Silveirinha facility. Judicial proceedings between the parties that were supposed to urbanize the plots where the Campo Estrela is are still ongoing in court.

In the aftermath of the conflicts between the SAD and the club, the former decided to re-invest in the Silveirinha Complex as the club prohibited the SAD from using the Campo Estrela facilities. Works were not completed in time and so the SAD played the 2019/2020 Campeonato de Portugal season at the Parque Desportivo Eng. Joaquim António Moreira Carneiro, home to Sport Lisboa e Évora.

== Rivalries ==
=== Rivalry with Juventude de Évora ===
Lusitano's main rival is Juventude Sport Clube. The clubs are neighbours and the stadiums are confining properties. Literally a few inches from each other. Juventude was founded in 1918, seven years after Lusitano. The clubs met many times in different divisions.

The first clash recorded between Lusitano and Juventude was the Brito Paes-Sarmento Beires Cup on 1 May 1924. António Jacinto da Silva Brito Paes was an adventurer pilot who tried a direct flight to Madeira in 1922 on a plane called the Dark Knight. Guided by a mere compass, the plane crashed on the way, being rescued by a British ship. The intrepid pilot was now planning a journey to Macao in the Pátria, a Breguet 16 Bn2. The trophy was offered by a committee of merchants of Évora to fund this expedition and to be played, in the Ateneu field, between the Champions of the Évora FA, Lusitano Futebol Club and the well aligned eleven of Juventude Sport. Tickets could be purchased for the price of 2.50 PTE (seated) and 1.50 PTE . Juventude Sport Club won 2–1, thus winning the Brito Paes-Sarmento Beires Cup.

In the 1951/52 season Juventude was promoted to the Segunda Divisão as 1951 national champions of the Third Division. Both clubs fought head to head for the promotion to the Primeira Divisao and at the final matchday the Évora rivals were leveled in points. Lusitano, however, had more goals scored and defeated Juventude at the Campo Estrela and obtained an electrifying 5–5 draw in the Sanches Miranda. Lusitano went through to win promotion to the top tier where it would remain for 14 consecutive seasons, thus ending official derbies for a long period as Juventude never achieved promotion to the Primeira Divisão.

Lusitanists usually call rival supporters Cacaruças or Rasga-Roupa, while the Juventudists call Lusitano supporters Erbanários (Herbalists) due to the green and white colours.

In October 2019, as result of the conflict between the SAD and the club, and accusing Juventude of favouring the SAD, Lusitano broke off institutional relations with Juventude and also with SL Évora.

In 2022 the Evora derby returned as both clubes were playing the Campeonato de Portugal. On 20 November 2022 the derby between Juventude and Lusitano was the second most attended match of the weekend in Portugal, to see Lusitano win 1–2 with a dramatic last minute goal.

By the end of the 2023/24 Juventude descended to the regional league which means that the derbies of this season were the last ones ever to be played in the historical grounds of Campo Estrela and Sanches de Miranda as both clube are now building new stadiums which should be in use in 2025.

=== The Évora Derby ===
Season	Home	Away	Score	Competition	Score	Competition
1934/35	Juv. de Évora	Lusit. Évora	2-2	Évora FA 1		
1934/35	Lusit. Évora	Juv. de Évora	3-1	Évora FA 1		
1935/36	Lusit. Évora	Juv. de Évora	2-0	Évora FA 1		
1935/36	Juv. de Évora	Lusit. Évora	2-1	Évora FA 1		
1936/37	Lusit. Évora	Juv. de Évora	1-0	Évora FA 1		
1936/37	Juv. de Évora	Lusit. Évora	1-1	Évora FA 1		
1937/38	Juv. de Évora	Lusit. Évora	4-2	Évora FA 1		
1937/38	Lusit. Évora	Juv. de Évora	3-4	Évora FA 1		
1938/39	Lusit. Évora	Juv. de Évora	2-1	Évora FA 1	0-3	2nd Division
1938/39	Juv. de Évora	Lusit. Évora	3-2	Évora FA 1	3-1	2nd Division
1939/40	Juv. de Évora	Lusit. Évora	1-1	Évora FA 1	4-0	2nd Division
1939/40	Lusit. Évora	Juv. de Évora	1-1	Évora FA 1	2-5	2nd Division
1940/41	Lusit. Évora	Juv. de Évora	2-1	Évora FA 1	1-1	2nd Division
1940/41	Juv. de Évora	Lusit. Évora	3-2	Évora FA 1	4-1	2nd Division
1941/42	Lusit. Évora	Juv. de Évora	0-2	Évora FA 1	2-3	2nd Division
1941/42	Juv. de Évora	Lusit. Évora	2-0	Évora FA 1	9-0	2nd Division
1942/43	Lusit. Évora	Juv. de Évora	0-5	Évora FA 1	2-1	2nd Division
1942/43	Juv. de Évora	Lusit. Évora	3-1	Évora FA 1	2-2	2nd Division
1943/44	Juv. de Évora	Lusit. Évora	5-1	Évora FA 1	2-1	2nd Division
1943/44	Lusit. Évora	Juv. de Évora	1-3	Évora FA 1	1-4	2nd Division
1944/45	Lusit. Évora	Juv. de Évora	3-2	Évora FA 1	1-3	2nd Division
1944/45	Juv. de Évora	Lusit. Évora	4-1	Évora FA 1	1-4	2nd Division
1945/46	Lusit. Évora	Juv. de Évora	2-2	Évora FA 1	Allocated to Different Series	
1945/46	Juv. de Évora	Lusit. Évora	4-1	Évora FA 1	Allocated to Different Series	
1946/47	Lusit. Évora	Juv. de Évora	1-3	Évora FA 1	Allocated to Different Series	
1946/47	Juv. de Évora	Lusit. Évora	2-2	Évora FA 1	Allocated to Different Series	
1947/48	Lusit. Évora	Juv. de Évora	N/A			
1947/48	Juv. de Évora	Lusit. Évora	N/A			
1948/49	Lusit. Évora	Juv. de Évora	1-1	Évora FA 1		
1948/49	Juv. de Évora	Lusit. Évora	1-0	Évora FA 1		
1949/50	Lusit. Évora	Juv. de Évora	0-3	2nd Division		
1949/50	Juv. de Évora	Lusit. de Évora	4-1	2nd Division		
1950/51	Lusit. de Évora competed in the 2nd Division and Juv. de Évora competed in the 3rd Division.					
1951/52	Juv. de Évora	Lusit. Évora	5-5	2nd Division		
1951/52	Lusit. Évora	Juv. de Évora	3-2	2nd Division		
1952/53	Lusit. de Évora competed in the 1st Division					
1953/54	Lusit. de Évora competed in the 1st Division					
1954/55	Lusit. de Évora competed in the 1st Division					
1955/56	Lusit. de Évora competed in the 1st Division					
1956/57	Lusit. de Évora competed in the 1st Division					
1957/58	Lusit. de Évora competed in the 1st Division					
1958/59	Lusit. de Évora competed in the 1st Division					
1959/60	Lusit. de Évora competed in the 1st Division					
1960/61	Lusit. de Évora competed in the 1st Division					
1961/62	Lusit. de Évora competed in the 1st Division					
1962/63	Lusit. de Évora competed in the 1st Division					
1963/64	Lusit. de Évora competed in the 1st Division					
1964/65	Lusit. de Évora competed in the 1st Division					
1965/66	Lusit. de Évora competed in the 1st Division					
1966/67	Lusit. de Évora competed in the 2nd Division and Juv. de Évora competed in the 3rd Division.					
1967/68	Lusit. de Évora competed in the 2nd Division and Juv. de Évora competed in the 3rd Division.					
1968/69	Lusit. de Évora competed in the 2nd Division and Juv. de Évora competed in the 3rd Division.					
1969/70	Lusit. de Évora competed in the 2nd Division and Juv. de Évora competed in the 3rd Division.					
1970/71	Lusit. Évora	Juv. de Évora	2-1	3rd Division		
1970/71	Juv. de Évora	Lusit. Évora	1-0	3rd Division		
1971/72	Lusit. de Évora competed in the 2nd Division and Juv. de Évora competed in the 3rd Division.					
1972/73	Juv. de Évora	Lusit. Évora	1-1	3rd Division		
1972/73	Lusit. Évora	Juv. de Évora	1-1	3rd Division		
1973/74	Lusit. de Évora competed in the 2nd Division and Juv. de Évora competed in the 3rd Division.					
1974/75	Juv. de Évora	Lusit. Évora	2-1	2nd Division		
1974/75	Lusit. Évora	Juv. de Évora	0-0	2nd Division		
1975/76	Juv. de Évora	Lusit. Évora	1-1	2nd Division		
1975/76	Lusit. Évora	Juv. de Évora	1-0	2nd Division		
1976/77	Lusit. Évora	Juv. de Évora	1-1	2nd Division		
1976/77	Juv. de Évora	Lusit. Évora	1-1	2nd Division		
1977/78	Lusit. Évora	Juv. de Évora	1-1	2nd Division		
1977/78	Juv. de Évora	Lusit. Évora	1-0	2nd Division		
1978/79	Juv. de Évora competed in the 2nd Division and Lusit. de Évora competed in the 3rd Division.					
1979/80	Juv. de Évora	Lusit. Évora	1-1	2nd Division		
1979/80	Lusit. Évora	Juv. de Évora	1-1	2nd Division		
1980/81	Lusit. Évora	Juv. de Évora	1-0	2nd Division		
1980/81	Juv. de Évora	Lusit. Évora	3-2	2nd Division		
1981/82	Juv. de Évora	Lusit. Évora	4-2	2nd Division		
1981/82	Lusit. Évora	Juv. de Évora	1-3	2nd Division		
1982/83	Lusit. Évora	Juv. de Évora	1-1	2nd Division		
1982/83	Juv. de Évora	Lusit. Évora	0-0	2nd Division		
1983/84	Lusit. de Évora competed in the 2nd Division and Juv. de Évora competed in the 3rd Division.					
1984/85	Lusit. de Évora competed in the 2nd Division and Juv. de Évora competed in the 3rd Division.					
1985/86	Lusit. Évora	Juv. de Évora	0-0	2nd Division		
1985/86	Juv. de Évora	Lusit. Évora	1-2	2nd Division		
1986/87	Lusit. Évora	Juv. de Évora	1-0	3rd Division		
1986/87	Juv. de Évora	Lusit. Évora	0-1	3rd Division		
1987/88	Lusit. Évora	Juv. de Évora	2-1	3rd Division		
1987/88	Juv. de Évora	Lusit. Évora	0-0	3rd Division		
1988/89	Juv. de Évora	Lusit. Évora	0-1	2nd Division		
1988/89	Lusit. Évora	Juv. de Évora	0-0	2nd Division		
1989/90	Lusit. Évora	Juv. de Évora	0-0	2nd Division		
1989/90	Juv. de Évora	Lusit. Évora	2-1	2nd Division		
1990/91	Lusit. Évora	Juv. de Évora	1-0	II B		
1990/91	Juv. de Évora	Lusit. Évora	0-0	II B		
1991/92	Lusit. Évora	Juv. de Évora	1-1	II B		
1991/92	Juv. de Évora	Lusit. Évora	2-1	II B		
1992/93	Lusit. Évora	Juv. de Évora	1-0	II B		
1992/93	Juv. de Évora	Lusit. Évora	1-0	II B		
1993/94	Juv. de Évora competed in the II B and Lusit. de Évora competed in the III Division. The teams met in the Portuguese Cup - Lusit. Évora 1 - 0 Juv. Évora					
1994/95	Lusit. Évora	Juv. de Évora	1-1	II B		
1994/95	Juv. de Évora	Lusit. Évora	2-1	II B		
1995/96	Lusit. Évora	Juv. de Évora	1-0	III		
1995/96	Juv. de Évora	Lusit. Évora	2-1	III		
1996/97	Juv. de Évora competed in the II B and Lusit. de Évora competed in the III Division.					
1997/98	Juv. de Évora competed in the II B and Lusit. de Évora competed in the III Division.					
1998/99	Juv. de Évora competed in the II B and Lusit. de Évora competed in the III Division.					
1999/00	Juv. de Évora competed in the II B and Lusit. de Évora competed in the III Division.					
2000/01	Lusit. de Évora competed in the 2nd Division and Juv. de Évora competed in the 3rd Division.					
2001/02	Juv. de Évora	Lusit. Évora	2-1	III		
2001/02	Lusit. Évora	Juv. de Évora	0-0	III		
2002/03	Lusit. Évora	Juv. de Évora	1-1	III		
2002/03	Juv. de Évora	Lusit. Évora	1-1	III		
2003/04	Juv. de Évora competed in the III Division and Lusit. de Évora competed in the Évora FA Division 1.					
2004/05	Lusit. Évora	Juv. de Évora	1-0	III		
2004/05	Juv. de Évora	Lusit. Évora	1-0	III		
2005/06	Lusit. Évora	Juv. de Évora	1-1	III		
2005/06	Juv. de Évora	Lusit. Évora	0-1	III		
2006/07	Lusit. Évora	Juv. de Évora	0-1	III		
2006/07	Juv. de Évora	Lusit. Évora	0-0	III		
2007/08	Juv. de Évora competed in the 2nd Division D and Lusit. de Évora competed in the III Division.					
2008/09	Juv. de Évora	Lusit. Évora	2-0	III		
2008/09	Lusit. Évora	Juv. de Évora	2-1	III		
2009/10	Lusit. Évora	Juv. de Évora	1-1	III		
2009/10	Juv. de Évora	Lusit. Évora	0-0	III		
2010/11	Juv. de Évora competed in the 2nd Division South and Lusit. de Évora competed in the Évora FA Division 1					
2011/12	Lusit. Évora suspended professional football					
2012/13	Juv. de Évora competed in the 3rd Division and Lusit. de Évora competed in the Évora FA Division 2.					
2013/14	Juv. de Évora competed in the Evora FA Division 1 and Lusit. Évora competed in the Evora FA Division 2					
2014/15	Juv. de Évora	Lusit. Évora	0-1	Évora FA 1	2-1	Évora FA Promotion Tournament
2014/15	Lusit. Évora	Juv. de Évora	0-3	Évora FA 1	1-2	Évora FA Promotion Tournament
2015/16	Juv. de Évora competed in the 3nd Division and Lusit. Évora competed in the Évora FA Division 1					
2016/17	Juv. de Évora	Lusit. Évora	2-0	Évora FA 1		
2016/17	Lusit. Évora	Juv. de Évora	2-0	Évora FA 1		
2017/18	Juv. de Évora	Lusit. Évora	2-2	Évora FA 1	1-1 (3–5)	Dinis Vital Cup Quarter-finals
2017/18	Lusit. Évora	Juv. de Évora	2-3	Évora FA 1		
2018/19	Juv. de Évora	Lusit. Évora	2-2	Évora FA 1	4-3 (a.e.t.)	Dinis Vital Cup Final
2018/19	Lusit. Évora	Juv. de Évora	1-1	Évora FA 1	3-1	Évora FA Supercup Final
2019/20	Lusit. Évora competed in the Évora FA 2 (Separation from the SAD) Juv. Évora competed in the Évora FA 1.					
2020/21	Lusit. Évora competed in the Évora FA 1 and Juv. de Évora competed in the Campeonato de Portugal.					
2021/22	Lusit. Évora competed in the Évora FA 1 and Juv. de Évora competed in the Campeonato de Portugal.					
2022/23	Juv. Évora	Lusit. Évora	1-2	Campeonato de Portugal	Last goal ever in a derby at the Sanches Miranda	
2022/23	Lusit. Évora	Juv. Évora	0-1	Campeonato de Portugal	Last goal ever scored in a derby in the old stadiums	
2023/24	Juv. Évora	Lusit. Évora	0-0	Campeonato de Portugal	Last derby at the Sanches de Miranda	
2023/24	Lusit. Évora	Juv. Évora	0-0	Campeonato de Portugal	Last derby at the Campo Estrela	
2024/25	Lusit. Évora competed in the Campeonato de Portugal and Juv. Évora competed in the Evora FA 1					
2025/26	Lusit. Évora competed in Liga 3 and Juv. Évora competed in the Campeonato de Portugal					
2026/27	Lusit. Évora competed in Liga 3 and Juv. Évora competed in the Campeonato de Portugal					

== Current squad ==
As of 22 September 2026

Note: Flags indicate national team as defined under FIFA eligibility rules; some limited exceptions apply. Players may hold more than one non-FIFA nationality.

No.	Pos.	Nation	Player
1	GK	BRA	Matheus Lemes
2	DF	POR	Marco Baixinho
4	DF	POR	Cassiano
5	MF	SEN	Ousmane Diagne
7	FW	POR	Rui Batalha
8	MF	POR	Tiago Baptista
9	FW	POR	Dida
10	MF	POR	Martim Águas
11	FW	STP	Sérgio Malé
13	MF	GBS	Bura Nogueira
15	FW	POR	António Carreiro
17	FW	POR	Gustavo Vicente
19	FW	POR	Luís Mota

No.	Pos.	Nation	Player
20	FW	POR	David Silva
21	DF	BRA	Marcos Soares
22	GK	POR	Duarte Martins
23	MF	POR	Diogo Sequeira
25	DF	POR	João Pinto
27	FW	POR	Simão Rosa
30	FW	NGR	Sele Davou
31	GK	ANG	Ricardo Batista (on loan from Casa Pia)
37	DF	POR	Rodrigo Monteiro
53	MF	POR	Euri Carvalho
71	MF	GEQ	Jannick Buyla
87	MF	ANG	José Mussole

== Personnel ==
=== President of the club ===
- Chairman: Pedro Caldeira

=== Coaching staff ===
As of 26 August 2026

- Head coach: Pedro Russiano
- Assistant coach: David Canilho
- Assistant coach: David Carrageta

== Coaching history ==
- (Portugal) Domingos Coelho Morais (1911–1919)
- (Portugal) Manuel Albergaria Seixas Bandarra (1920)
- (France) [Charles Roger Marquis (1934–35)
- (Argentina) Anselmo Pisa (1950/52)
- (Spain) Domingo García y García (1953/54)
- (Portugal) Cândido Tavares (1954/55)
- (Portugal) Severiano Correia (1955/56)
- (Brazil) (Spain) Otto Bumbel (1956–1958; 1962)
- (Spain) Lorenzo Ausina (1958–1960)
- (Argentina) Dante Bianchi (1960)
- (Portugal) Trindade dos Santos (1961)
- (Portugal) João Brochado (1961)
- (Romania) Iosif Fabian (1962/62)
- (Hungary) Janos Biri (1962; 1966)
- (Hungary) János Hrötkö (1963–64)
- (Uruguay) Humberto Buchelli (1964)
- (Argentina) Filpo Núñez (1964)
- (Spain) Miguel Bertral (1964–66)
- (Brazil) Otto Bumbel (1956–1958; 1962)
- (Spain) Miguel Bertral (1966–69)
- (Portugal) Alberto Cunha (1969–70)
- (Brazil) Leonildo Vilanova (1971–1973; 1989/90)
- (Portugal) Mitó (1973–75)
- (Portugal) Mário Nunes (1977–78)
- (Hungary) Josef Toth Zelle (1977–78)
- (Portugal) Juanito (1979–81)
- (Portugal) Dinis Vital (1982–83)
- (Portugal) Joaquim Teixeira (1983–84)
- (Portugal) Carlos Alhinho (1984–85)
- (Portugal) Mitó (1985–86)
- (Portugal) João Libório (1986–87)
- (Portugal) Carlos Cardoso (1987–88)
- (Portugal) Pedro Gomes (1988–89)
- (Portugal) Joaquim Meirim (1989–90)
- (Brazil) Leonildo Vilanova (1971–1973; 1989/90)
- (Portugal) Dinis Vital (1991–92)
- (Portugal) Juanito (1992–93)
- (Portugal) Fernando Casaca (1992–93)
- (Portugal) João Cardoso (1993–96)
- (Portugal) José Rocha (1999–2000)
- (Portugal) Luís Perdigão (2000–01)
- (Portugal) Dinis Vital (2001–02)
- (Portugal) Vitor Emoriz (2002–003)
- (Portugal) João Inverno (2003)
- (Portugal) Pedro Baptista (2003–05)
- (Portugal) Teixeira (2005–2006)
- (Portugal) José Vasques (2006–2007)
- (Portugal) Paulo Sousa (2007–2009)
- (Portugal) João Paulo Fialho (2009–2010)
- (Portugal) Luís Patrão (2010–2011)
- (Portugal) Nélson Valente (2012–2015)
- (Portugal) André Barreto (2016–2017)
- (Portugal) Duarte Machado (2017–2018)
- (Portugal) Rui Salgado (2018–2019)
- (Portugal) Nélson Valente (2019–2022)
- (Portugal) João Nívea (2022–2024)
- (Portugal) Pedro Russiano (2024–2025)
- (Portugal) Ricardo Pessoa (2025)
- (Portugal) Pedro Russiano (2025–present)

== Notable players ==
- (Portugal) Cândido Tavares
- (Portugal) Dinis Vital
- (Portugal) José Pedro Biléu
- (Portugal) Falé
- (Portugal) Madeira
- (Portugal) Patalino
- (Argentina) Vicente Di Paola
- (Argentina) Valle
- (Portugal) Pepe
- (Portugal) Soeiro
- (Portugal) Augusto Batalha
- (Portugal) Polido
- (Portugal) Duarte
- (Portugal) Teotónio
- (Portugal) Vicente
- (Portugal) Athos
- (Portugal) Manuel Paixão
- (Portugal) Caraça
- (Guinea-Bissau) Flora
- (Brazil) Índio
- (Portugal) Teixeira da Silva
- (Spain) Miguel Bertral
- (Honduras) José Cardona
- (Honduras) Justo Wilfredo Garcia
- (Paraguay) Melanio Olmedo
- (Portugal) Morato
- (Portugal) Augusto Matine
- (Portugal) Carlos Zambujo
- (Portugal) Chico Bolota
- (Portugal) Carlos Cunha
- (Portugal) José Chico
- (Brazil) José Cândido
- (Portugal) Dedeu
- (Portugal) Martelo
- (Bulgaria) Ruzhin Kerimov
- (Portugal) Manuel Sardinha
- (Angola) Joaquim Ramalho
- (Portugal) Alexandre Alhinho
- (Portugal) Óscar Duarte
- (Portugal) Figueiredo
- (Portugal) Pio
- (Portugal) Zorrinho
- (Portugal) Jorge Vital
- (Brazil) Macaé
- (Portugal) Jorge Teigão
- (Portugal) Rui Romicha
- (Portugal) Zé Eduardo
- (Portugal) Robson
- (Portugal) Paulo Sousa
- (Portugal) José Carlos Barbosa
- (Portugal) Ricardo Pateiro
- (Portugal) Calila
- (Portugal) Toni Lopes
- (Portugal) Zé Tó
- (Portugal) Tó Zé
- (Portugal) Teixeira
- (Portugal) João de Deus
- (Portugal) Nuno Curto
- (Portugal) Toni
- (Portugal) Luís Canhoto
- (Cape Verde) Hélder Cabral
- (Portugal) Targino
- (United States) Nate Kaden

== Honours ==
- Military Order of Our Knights of Lord Jesus Christ

- 1932

- Portuguese Second Division

- Winners (1): 1951–52

- Campeonato de Portugal (4th tier)

- Winners (1): 2024-25

- Fair-Play Cup Mundo Desportivo

- Winners (2): 1957 and 1958

- Portuguese Third Division

- Vice-Champions: 1993–94

- Évora FA Championship

- Winners (15): 1917–18, 1921–22, 1922–23, 1926–27, 1927–28, 1928–29, 1930–31, 1932–33, 1933–34, 1934–35, 1939–40, 1940–41, 2003–04, 2018–19, 2021-2022

- Évora FA Cup

- Winners (5): 2003–04, 2015–16, 2016–17, 2017–18, 2020-2021, 2021-2022

- Évora FA Supercup

- Winners (3): 2016–17, 2018–19, 2021/2022

== League and cup history ==
Season	League									Cup	Notes
Season	Tier	Pos	Pld	W	D	L	GF	GA	Pts	Cup	Notes
1934/35	2	4th	8	2	2	4	13	20	6	Not held	2nd Division - Zone D Series 8
1935/36	2	5th	7	1	0	6	6	21	2	Not held	2nd Division - Series 7
1936/37	Reg	-	-	-	-	-	-	-	-		Not qualified for the II League in the Evora FA Championship
1937/38	Reg	-	-	-	-	-	-	-	-		Not qualified for the II League in the Evora FA Championship
1938/39	2	4th	10	5	1	4	23	20	11	Did not enter	2nd Division - Alto Alentejo
1939/40	2	5th	9	3	1	5	19	21	7	Did not enter	2nd Division - Alto Alentejo
1940/41	2	2nd	6	2	1	3	9	16	5	Did not enter	2nd Division - Alto Alentejo
1941/42	2	4th	6	0	1	5	5	28	1	Did not enter	2nd Division - Series 10
1942/43	2	2nd	6	3	2	1	14	18	8	Did not enter	2nd Division - Series 12 Subseries 1
1943/44	2	2nd	6	4	0	2	16	9	8	Did not enter	2nd Division - Series 12 Subseries 1
1944/45	2	5th	10	2	3	5	17	28	7	Did not enter	2nd Division - Series 14
1945/46	3	-	-	-	-	-	-	-	-	Did not enter	Last season where the Evora FA teams were prohibited from ascending to 1st Division
1946/47	2	6th	10	0	2	8	10	33	2	Not held	2nd Division - Series 14
1947/48	2	8th	14	-	-	-	-	-	4	Did not enter	Relegated
1948/49	3	-	-	-	-	-	-	-	-	Did not enter	
1949/50	2	7th	14	-	-	-	-	-	9	Not held	2nd Division - Series F
1950/51	2	1st	16	13	2	1	56	16	28	Did not enter	2nd Division Series D (Not promoted Final Four)
1951/52	2	↑ 2nd	18	12	4	2	66	26	9	Did not enter	Promoted (Final Four). 2nd Division Champions
1952/53	1	7th	26	10	5	11	31	44	25	Semi-finals	First season in the 1st Division
1953/54	1	10th	26	9	3	14	47	66	21	Round of 16	
1954/55	1	10th	26	9	3	14	40	70	21	Round of 16	
1955/56	1	8th	26	6	9	11	38	55	21	Round of 16	
1956/57	1	5th	26	13	4	9	57	51	30	Round of 16	Best classification ever in the 1st Division
1957/58	1	6th	26	10	4	12	37	36	24	Round of 16	
1958/59	1	9th	26	8	5	13	40	49	21	Semi-finals	
1959/60	1	10th	26	6	9	11	32	55	21	Round of 32	
1960/61	1	11th	26	9	3	14	29	51	21	Round of 64	Relegation playoff winners
1961/62	1	12th	26	9	2	15	31	42	20	Round of 16	Relegation playoff winners
1962/63	1	7th	26	9	5	12	33	41	23	Round of 32	
1963/64	1	11th	26	5	4	17	40	49	14	Quarter-finals	
1964/65	1	12th	26	9	2	15	30	51	20	Round of 32	
1965/66	1	↓ 13th	26	4	6	16	22	51	14	Round of 64	Relegated. Last season in League I
1966/67	2	8th	26	9	4	13	46	49	11	Round of 32	
1967/68	2	6th	26	11	3	12	29	33	25	Round of 64	
1968/69	2	9th	26	7	8	11	28	35	22	Round of 64	
1969/70	2	↓ 14th	26	3	3	20	19	59	9	Second Round	Relegated
1970/71	3	2nd	30	15	8	7	46	49	11	Round of 32	First season in 3rd Division. Promoted
1971/72	2	↓ 15th	30	7	3	20	32	58	17	Second Round	Relegated
1972/73	3	↑1st	30	16	9	5	63	26	41	Round of 64	Promoted
1973/74	2	6th	38	17	8	13	46	41	42	Second Round	
1974/75	2	15th	38	9	13	16	35	58	31	Fourth Round	
1975/76	2	18th	38	9	11	18	30	55	29	Third Round	No team was relegated due to the creation of Zona Centro
1976/77	2	9th	30	8	12	10	31	33	28	Second Round	
1977/78	2	↓ 15th	30	6	12	12	28	35	24	Second Round	Relegated
1978/79	3	↑1st	30	21	7	2	70	15	49	Round of 64	Promoted
1979/80	2	2nd	30	12	12	6	40	27	36	Round of 64	1st Division access playoffs
1980/81	2	9th	30	10	10	10	31	26	30	Round of 64	
1981/82	2	3rd	30	15	6	9	42	29	36	Round of 64	
1982/83	2	2nd	30	13	10	7	31	13	36	Round of 32	1st Division access playoffs
1983/84	2	11th	30	8	10	12	30	34	26	Second Round	
1984/85	2	12th	30	9	8	13	41	43	26	Round of 64	
1985/86	2	↓ 15th	30	6	6	18	21	53	18	Round of 64	Relegated
1986/87	3	5th	30	15	4	11	34	27	34	First Round	
1987/88	3	↑2nd	38	25	8	5	69	21	58	Fifth Round	Promoted
1988/89	2	12th	34	9	13	12	27	31	31	First Round	
1989/90	2	12th	34	8	12	14	41	54	28	Round of 32	Did not qualify for the new Divisão de Honra. Last season in 2nd Division
1990/91	3	4th	38	18	10	10	46	36	46	Round of 32	2nd Division (B)
1991/92	3	5th	34	11	15	8	39	31	37	Fourth Round	2nd Division (B)
1992/93	3	↓ 17th	34	6	6	22	26	66	18	Fourth Round	2nd Division (B)
1993/94	4	↑1st	34	6	6	22	26	66	18	Fourth Round	Third Division Vice-Champions
1994/95	3	↓ 16th	34	7	12	15	42	61	33	Fourth Round	Relegated
1995/96	4	7th	34	13	9	12	39	35	48	Second Round	Third Division - Series F
1996/97	4	5th	34	14	9	11	46	49	51	Third Round	Third Division - Series F
1997/98	4	9th	34	14	6	14	49	40	48	Second Round	Third Division - Series F
1998/99	4	4th	34	16	16	2	61	33	64	2nd Round	Third Division - Series F
1999/00	4	↑2nd	34	22	6	6	63	24	72	3rd Round	Promoted
2000/01	3	↓20th	38	5	9	24	31	66	24	Fourth Round	Relegated
2001/02	4	14th	34	11	7	16	48	48	40	First round	Third Division - Series F
2002/03	4	15th	34	10	9	15	36	46	39	First round	Relegated
2003/04	Reg	1st	26	-	-	-	-	-	61	Did not enter	Évora FA Champions, Évora FA Cup Winners
2004/05	4	9th	34	13	7	14	52	49	46	Third Round	Third Division - Series F
2005/06	4	3rd	32	17	9	6	48	27	60	Second Round	Third Division - Series F
2006/07	4	11th	28	10	7	11	34	35	37	First Round	Third Division - Series F
2007/08	4	9th	26	10	7	9	36	35	37	Second Round	Third Division - Series F
2008/09	4	10th	26	7	8	11	21	31	29	First Round	Third Division - Series F
2009/10	4	12th	22	2	9	11	19	31	15	Second Round	Third Division - Series F
2010-11	Reg	2nd	-	-	-	-	-	-	65	Did not enter	Professional Football suspended
2011-12	No professional football										
2012/13	Reg 2	1st	26	19	3	4	65	29	60	Did not enter	Évora FA 2 Champions. No promotion due to the attempt of the FA to create a third tier.
2013/14	Reg 2	1st	14	9	4	1	37	5	31	Did not enter	Évora FA 2 Champions
2014/15	Reg 1	3rd	22	14	4	4	33	17	46	Did not enter	
2015/16	Reg 1	5th	24	14	6	4	46	20	48	Did not enter	Évora FA Cup Winners
2016/17	Reg 1	4th	26	15	6	5	43	18	51	Second Round	Évora FA Cup Winners, Évora FA Super Cup Winners
2017/18	Reg 1	4th	26	15	3	8	52	26	48	Third Round	Évora FA Cup Winners
2018/19	Reg 1	1st	26	17	8	1	53	19	59	Second Round	Évora FA Champions, Évora FA Super Cup Winners. Separation from the SAD. Voluntary relegation to Evora FA 2 League.
2019/20	Reg 2	1st	19	17	0	2	92	10	51	Did not enter	
2020/21	Reg 1	9th	20	6	5	9	19	23	23	Did not enter	Evora FA League abandoned due to COVID-19 Pandemic
2021/22	Reg 1	2nd	10	7	0	3	15	7	21	First Round	Évora FA Champions, Évora FA Cup Winners, Évora FA Super Cup Winners. Promoted to Campeonato de Portugal
2022/23	4	2nd	26	15	6	5	35	22	51	First Round	Qualified for final play-off but ended 4th
2023/24	4	3nd	26	11	13	2	28	9	46	Second Round	Least goals suffered in all Portuguese professional leagues
2024/25	4	1st	33	24	5	4	73	19	58	Round of 16	Champions and promoted to Liga 3
2025/26	3	6th	28	11	6	11	30	29	22+24	Round of 32	
2026/27	3										

== Other Sports ==
The club had gymnastics, fencing, basketball, rugby, orienteering and tennis sections. The club currently has more than 350 athletes registered.
