= 1953–54 Primeira Divisão =

20th season of top-tier Portuguese football

Primeira Liga
- Season: 1953–54
- Champions: Sporting CP; 9th title
- Relegated: Oriental
- Matches played: 182
- Goals scored: 683 (3.75 per match)

Statistics of the Portuguese Liga in the 1953–54 season.

== Overview ==
Location of teams in the 1953–54 Liga

It was contested by 14 teams, and Sporting Clube de Portugal won the championship.

== League standings ==
Pos	Team	Pld	W	D	L	GF	GA	GD	Pts	Qualification or relegation
1	Sporting CP (C)	26	20	3	3	80	25	+55	43	
2	Porto	26	16	4	6	83	35	+48	36	
3	Benfica	26	13	6	7	62	40	+22	32	
4	Belenenses	26	13	5	8	43	39	+4	31	
5	Braga	26	12	4	10	54	36	+18	28	
6	Atlético CP	26	10	8	8	49	43	+6	28	
7	Sporting da Covilhã	26	10	8	8	43	39	+4	28	
8	Vitória de Guimarães	26	10	5	11	44	64	−20	25	
9	Barreirense	26	8	6	12	34	47	−13	22	
10	Lusitano de Évora	26	9	3	14	47	66	−19	21	
11	Boavista	26	7	5	14	29	66	−37	19	
12	Vitória de Setúbal	26	7	4	15	51	66	−15	18	
13	Académica	26	8	2	16	29	50	−21	18	
14	Oriental (R)	26	4	7	15	35	67	−32	15	Relegation to Segunda Divisão

Source: rsssf.org
(C) Champions; (R) Relegated

== Results ==
Home \ Away	ACA	ACP	BAR	BEL	BEN	BOA	BRA	LUS	ORI	POR	SCP	SCO	VGU	VSE
Académica		1–0	2–0	0–1	1–2	3–1	3–2	2–1	2–1	1–2	0–2	1–3	1–0	0–2
Atlético CP	1–1		3–0	0–0	1–2	5–1	2–2	3–2	6–2	3–3	3–1	3–1	5–1	1–0
Barreirense	3–1	2–2		2–1	1–1	1–0	0–0	3–1	1–1	2–0	1–1	0–0	6–3	3–2
Belenenses	3–3	1–2	2–0		1–1	2–1	2–1	4–0	5–2	5–2	2–0	2–2	3–0	3–1
Benfica	1–2	2–0	2–1	2–0		3–0	2–1	5–2	5–0	2–2	0–2	5–1	2–2	9–0
Boavista	1–0	1–1	3–1	2–0	1–3		2–1	1–1	3–1	0–6	1–3	0–0	4–3	3–1
Braga	2–0	3–2	2–0	7–0	5–0	5–0		2–1	3–1	3–1	1–3	0–0	3–2	3–2
Lusitano Évora	3–0	2–1	6–4	1–2	0–2	1–1	3–1		6–2	2–0	3–3	3–1	1–2	4–1
Oriental	3–2	1–2	1–0	3–0	0–0	0–0	2–1	2–3		1–1	2–4	1–1	2–2	3–3
Porto	4–1	3–0	5–0	0–2	5–3	9–1	1–0	6–0	6–1		1–0	1–0	10–0	9–4
Sporting CP	3–1	7–0	2–0	4–0	3–2	2–1	2–0	9–0	2–1	2–1		7–0	5–0	2–1
Sporting da Covilhã	1–0	0–0	3–2	2–0	2–2	4–0	2–4	4–0	3–0	0–2	2–2		5–1	3–0
Vitória de Guimarães	1–0	2–1	3–0	1–1	2–1	3–0	2–2	3–1	2–1	1–2	1–5	2–0		3–1
Vitória de Setúbal	7–1	2–2	0–1	0–1	5–3	7–1	1–0	2–0	4–1	1–1	1–4	1–3	2–2	

Source: rsssf.org
Legend: Blue = home team win; Yellow = draw; Red = away team win.
