= Cardosas =

- Civil parish
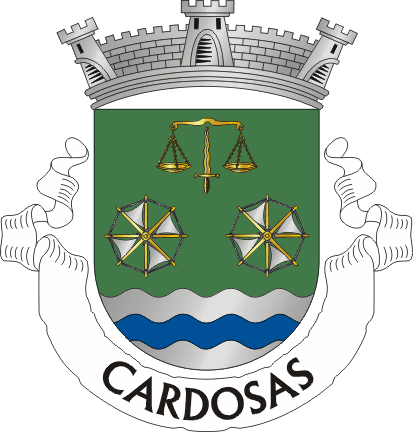
- Coat of arms

- Location in Portugal
- Coordinates: 38°58′38″N 9°2′27″W
- Country: Portugal
- Region: Oeste e Vale do Tejo
- Intermunic. comm.: Oeste
- District: Lisbon
- Municipality: Arruda dos Vinhos

Area
  - Total: 6.01 km^{2} (2.32 sq mi)

Population (2011)
  - Total: 836
  - Density: 140/km^{2} (360/sq mi)
- Time zone: UTC+00:00 (WET)
  - Summer (DST): UTC+01:00 (WEST)

Cardosas is a civil parish in the municipality of Arruda dos Vinhos, Portugal. The population in 2011 was 836, in an area of 6.01 km^{2}.
