= Arruda dos Vinhos =

- Municipality
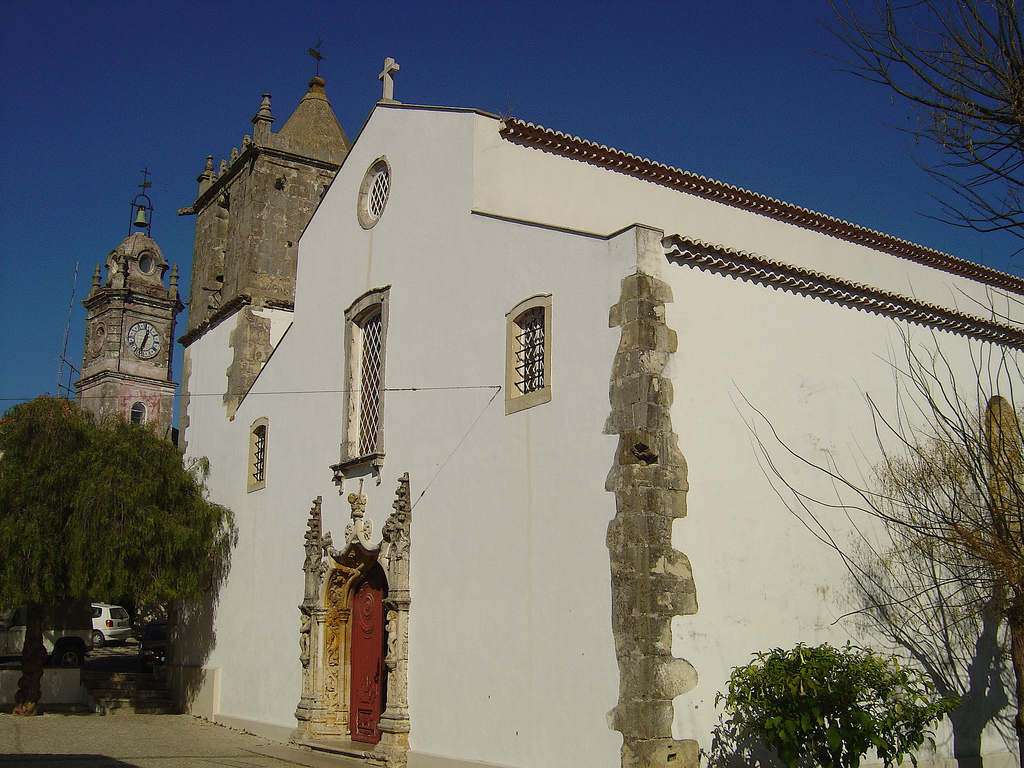
- Arruda dos Vinhos, Lisbon

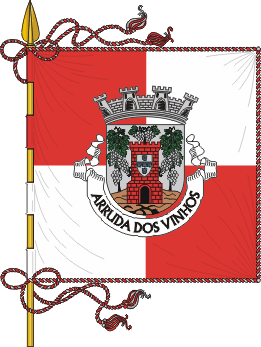
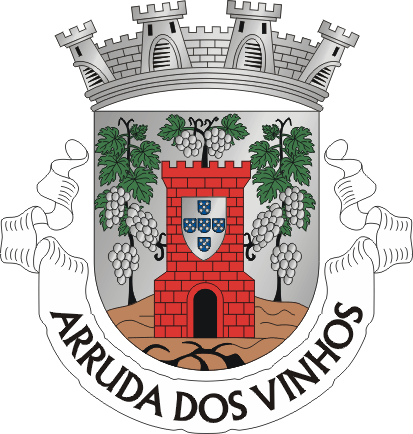
- Flag Coat of arms
- Interactive map of Arruda dos Vinhos
- Location in Portugal
- Coordinates: 38°59′N 9°04′W
- Country: Portugal
- Region: Oeste e Vale do Tejo
- Intermunic. comm.: Oeste
- District: Lisbon
- Parishes: 4

Government
  - President: André Rijo (PS)

Area
  - Total: 77.96 km^{2} (30.10 sq mi)

Population (2011)
  - Total: 13,391
  - Density: 171.8/km^{2} (444.9/sq mi)
- Time zone: UTC+00:00 (WET)
  - Summer (DST): UTC+01:00 (WEST)
- Local holiday: Ascension Day date varies
- Website: www.cm-arruda.pt

Arruda dos Vinhos (European Portuguese pronunciation: [ɐˈʁuðɐ ðuʒ ˈviɲuʃ]) is a municipality in the historical Estremadura province and in Lisbon District, of Portugal. The population in 2011 was 13,391, in an area of 77.96 square kilometres (30.10 mi^{2}).

The present Mayor is André Filipe dos Santos Rijo, elected from the Socialist Party.

== Parishes ==
Administratively, the municipality is divided into 4 civil parishes (freguesias):

- Arranhó
- Arruda dos Vinhos
- Cardosas
- Santiago dos Velhos

== Places of interest ==
In 1809-10 several forts were constructed in the municipality as part of the Lines of Torres Vedras, which were defensive lines to protect the Portuguese capital Lisbon from invasion by the French during the Peninsular War (1807–14) or, in the event of defeat, to safely embark the British Army led by the Duke of Wellington. Two of the hilltop forts, the Fort of Carvalha and the Fort of Cego, were recently restored and can be visited.

== Notable people ==
- Irene Lisboa (1892 in Quinta da Murzinheira – 1958) a Portuguese novelist, short story writer, poet, essayist and educational writer
- Marco Baixinho (born 1989 in Arruda dos Vinhos) a Portuguese footballer with over 330 club caps

== See also ==
- Arruda DOC, a wine designation.
