= Marco Baixinho =

Portuguese footballer (born 1989)

Personal information
- Full name: Marco João Costa Baixinho
- Date of birth: 11 July 1989 (age 37)
- Place of birth: Arruda dos Vinhos, Portugal
- Height: 1.86 m (6 ft 1 in)
- Position: Centre-back

Team information
- Current team: Lusitano Évora
- Number: 2

Youth career
- 1998–2005: Sporting CP
- 2005–2006: Benfica
- 2006–2007: Alverca
- 2007–2008: Oeiras

Senior career*
| Years | Team | Apps | (Gls) |
| 2008–2011 | Carregado | 69 | (7) |
| 2011–2015 | Mafra | 116 | (1) |
| 2015–2022 | Paços Ferreira | 166 | (9) |
| 2022–2023 | Anorthosis | 34 | (2) |
| 2023–2024 | União Leiria | 26 | (0) |
| 2025 | Semen Padang | 2 | (0) |
| 2026 | Académica | 11 | (1) |
| 2026– | Lusitano Évora | 3 | (0) |
- * Club domestic league appearances and goals as of 12 September 2026

Marco João Costa Baixinho (born 11 July 1989) is a Portuguese professional footballer who plays as a central defender for Liga 3 club Lusitano de Évora.

== Club career ==
Born in Arruda dos Vinhos, Lisbon District, Baixinho spent most of his youth career at Sporting CP and briefly rivals S.L. Benfica. He made his senior debut with A.D. Carregado in the third division in the 2008–09 season, winning promotion and then making his professional debut in the second, suffering instant relegation.

In the summer of 2011, Baixinho joined C.D. Mafra also of the third tier. On 23 June 2015, after four seasons of regular game time concluding with winning the title, he signed a two-year deal at Primeira Liga club F.C. Paços de Ferreira under his former Mafra manager Jorge Simão.

Baixinho extended his contract in January 2016, to last until July 2019. He scored his first top-flight goal on 5 December that year, opening a 2–1 home win over Boavista F.C. while playing in defensive midfield. After Paços were relegated in 2018, he netted four times to help them bounce back as champions (five in all competitions) and then signed a new deal in June 2019.

At the end of the 2021–22 campaign, having failed to agree terms for a new deal, the 33-year-old Baixinho left the Estádio da Mata Real. On 13 July 2022, he signed a two-year contract with Anorthosis Famagusta FC of the Cypriot First Division.

Baixinho returned to his homeland in July 2023, agreeing to a two-year deal at U.D. Leiria, recently promoted to division two. He left by mutual consent in December 2024, having totalled three goals from 33 appearances.

In January 2026, after a short spell in the Super League (Indonesia) with Semen Padang FC, Baixinho returned to Portugal and joined Liga 3 side Académica de Coimbra. Later that year, he moved to Lusitano G.C. in the same tier.

== Career statistics ==
As of match played 20 January 2025

Appearances and goals by club, season and competition
| Club | Season | League | | | National cup | | Europe | | Other | | Total | |
| Club | Season | Division | Apps | Goals | Apps | Goals | Apps | Goals | Apps | Goals | Apps | Goals |
|---|---|---|---|---|---|---|---|---|---|---|---|---|
| Carregado | 2009–10 | Liga de Honra | 14 | 0 | — | | — | | — | | 14 | 0 |
| Mafra | 2011–12 | Campeonato de Portugal | 29 | 0 | — | | — | | — | | 29 | 0 |
| Mafra | 2012–13 | Campeonato de Portugal | 27 | 0 | — | | — | | — | | 27 | 0 |
| Mafra | 2013–14 | Campeonato de Portugal | 32 | 1 | — | | — | | — | | 32 | 1 |
| Mafra | 2014–15 | Campeonato de Portugal | 28 | 0 | — | | — | | — | | 28 | 0 |
| Mafra | Total | | 116 | 1 | — | | — | | — | | 116 | 1 |
| Paços Ferreira | 2015–16 | Primeira Liga | 21 | 0 | 3 | 0 | — | | — | | 24 | 0 |
| Paços Ferreira | 2016–17 | Primeira Liga | 23 | 1 | 3 | 0 | — | | — | | 26 | 1 |
| Paços Ferreira | 2017–18 | Primeira Liga | 15 | 1 | 2 | 0 | — | | — | | 17 | 1 |
| Paços Ferreira | 2018–19 | LigaPro | 33 | 4 | 4 | 1 | — | | — | | 37 | 5 |
| Paços Ferreira | 2019–20 | Primeira Liga | 25 | 3 | 6 | 0 | — | | — | | 31 | 3 |
| Paços Ferreira | 2020–21 | Primeira Liga | 23 | 0 | 3 | 0 | — | | — | | 26 | 0 |
| Paços Ferreira | 2021–22 | Primeira Liga | 26 | 0 | 2 | 0 | 4 (Note: Appearances in UEFA Conference League) | 0 | — | | 32 | 0 |
| Paços Ferreira | Total | | 166 | 9 | 23 | 1 | 4 | 0 | — | | 193 | 10 |
| Anorthosis | 2022–23 | Cypriot First Division | 34 | 2 | 3 | 0 | — | | — | | 37 | 2 |
| União Leiria | 2023–24 | Liga Portugal 2 | 22 | 0 | 5 | 2 | — | | — | | 27 | 2 |
| União Leiria | 2024–25 | Liga Portugal 2 | 4 | 0 | 2 | 1 | — | | — | | 6 | 1 |
| União Leiria | Total | | 26 | 0 | 7 | 3 | 0 | 0 | — | | 33 | 3 |
| Semen Padang | 2024–25 | Liga 1 | 2 | 0 | 0 | 0 | — | | — | | 2 | 0 |
| Career total | | | 358 | 12 | 33 | 4 | 4 | 0 | 0 | 0 | 395 | 16 |

== Honours ==
Mafra

- Campeonato Nacional de Seniores: 2014–15

Paços Ferreira

- LigaPro: 2018–19
