= Otto Bumbel =

Brazilian football manager (1914–1998)

Personal information
- Full name: Pedro Otto Bumbel
- Date of birth: 6 July 1914
- Place of birth: Taquara, Brazil
- Date of death: 2 August 1998 (aged 84)
- Place of death: Porto Alegre, Brazil
- Position: Midfielder

Senior career*
Years	Team	Apps	(Gls)
- Floriano
- Flamengo
- Corinthians

Managerial career
- 1937–1938: Floriano
- 1938–1944: Cruzeiro-RS
- 1945–1946: Flamengo (assistant)
- 1946–1947: Grêmio
- 1948: Grêmio
- 1948–1950: Grêmio
- 1951: Grêmio
- 1951: Grêmio
- 1952: Saprissa
- 1953: Costa Rica
- 1954: Guatemala
- 1955–1956: Honduras
- 1956–1958: Lusitano
- 1958: Porto
- 1958–1959: Académica
- 1959–1960: Valencia
- 1960–1962: Racing Santander
- 1962: Lusitano
- 1962–1963: Elche
- 1963–1964: Sevilla
- 1964–1965: Atlético Madrid
- 1965–1967: Elche
- 1967–1969: Málaga
- 1970–1971: Elche
- 1971–1972: Mallorca
- 1973–1974: Sabadell
- 1977–1978: Málaga
- 1979: Racing Ferrol
- * Club domestic league appearances and goals

Pedro Otto Bumbel (6 July 1914 – 2 August 1998) was a Brazilian professional football player and coach who managed a number of Spanish club sides, including Sabadell, Valencia, Racing de Santander, Elche, Sevilla, Atlético Madrid and Málaga.

Before moving to Spain, Bumbel was active in Costa Rica with Saprissa, guiding the club to their first Primera División league title during the 1952–53 season.

== Managerial honours ==
Deportivo Saprissa

- Primera División de Costa Rica: 1953

Atletico Madrid

- Copa del Generalísimo: 1964-65
