= Vicente Di Paola =

Argentine footballer

Personal information
- Full name: Vicente Domingo Di Paola Cammarota
- Date of birth: 12 August 1923
- Place of birth: Buenos Aires, Argentina
- Position: Midfielder

Senior career*
Years	Team	Apps	(Gls)
1946–1949	Roma	78	(5)
1949–1950	Pisa	27	(3)
1950–1951	Lleida	17	(2)
1952-1955	Lusitano Évora	70	(8)
1955-1956	Académico	21	(5)
1956-1957	Beira-Mar	-	(-)
1957-1959	Portimonense	-	(-)
1959-1961	Serpa	-	(-)
- * Club domestic league appearances and goals

Vicente Domingo Di Paola Cammarota, known as Vicente Di Paola (born 12 August 1923, date of death unknown) was an Argentine professional football player.

Di Paola played 3 seasons (78 games, 5 goals) in the Serie A for A.S. Roma and three seasons in the Portuguese Primeira Divisão with Lusitano de Évora (70 games, 8 goals). Di Paola is deceased.
