= Anselmo Pisa =

Argentine footballer and manager (1918-1965)

Personal information
- Full name: Anselmo Hugo Pisa
- Date of birth: 7 April 1918
- Place of birth: Buenos Aires, Argentina
- Date of death: 16 October 1965
- Position: Midfielder

Senior career*
Years	Team	Apps	(Gls)
1939–1940	Banfield		
1940–1942	Lazio		
1942-43	Ambrosiana Inter		
1943-44	Estoril-Praia		

Managerial career
- 1948-49: Estoril-Praia
- 1949–1953: Lusitano Évora
- 1953-1954: Torreense
- 1955–1956: Sporting(youth)
- 1956: Sporting
- 1957–1961: Beira-Mar
- 1961–1962: Belenenses
- 1962–1963: CUF Barreiro
- * Club domestic league appearances and goals

Anselmo Hugo Pisa (7 April 1918 – 16 October 1965) was an Argentine-Italian professional footballer and manager.

He was the younger brother of Silvestro Pisa, and therefore known as Pisa II.

== Career ==
Anselmo Pisa started playing football in Argentina with Platense moving then to Banfield.

In 1940, he lands in Italy signaled by Alfredo Di Franco, sports manager of Lazio, a squad where we started playing in Serie A; Pisa remains with the team for the following season. In 1942-1943 he is at Ambrosiana-Inter.

With the Allied invasion of Italy in World War II Anselmo Pisa moved to neutral Portugal, joining Estoril Praia where he would finish his playing career.

After finishing his career as a footballer, Pisa began coaching Estoril Praia in the 1948/49 season.

In 1949 he signed up as coach with Lusitano de Évora where he was the mastermind behind the historical promotion of the Eborian team to the Portuguese Primeira Divisão for the first time in their history. He went to coach Torreense then in the second tier from 1953 to 1954 where he almost repeated the stunt of taking another club to the top tier.

After a brief return to Estoril-Praia, in 1955, he signed with Sporting CP as assistant to his fellow countryman Alejandro Scopelli and coaching the youth team where we was youth national and regional champion (1956 and 1957). For a short period between these two trophies he led the first team in two matches in 1956. He then sat on the bench of Beira-Mar which he also led to the Primeira Divisão for the first time. He eventually coached Belenenses and CUF Barreiro.

Anselmo Pisa died in 1965 at the age of 47 from a long-term illness.

On the centennial of his birth (7 April 2018) the municipality of Aveiro dedicated a street in the surroundings of the Aveiro Municipal Stadium to Anselmo Pisa in recognition of the feat of taking Beira-Mar for the first time to the Portuguese Primeira Divisão
