= 1952–53 Primeira Divisão =

19th season of top-tier Portuguese football

Primeira Liga
- Season: 1952–53
- Champions: Sporting CP; 8th title
- Relegated: G.D. Estoril-Praia
- Matches played: 182
- Goals scored: 623 (3.42 per match)

Statistics of Portuguese Liga in the 1952–53 season.

== Overview ==
Location of teams in the 1952–53 Liga

It was contested by 14 teams, and Sporting Clube de Portugal won the championship.

== League standings ==
Pos	Team	Pld	W	D	L	GF	GA	GD	Pts	Qualification or relegation
1	Sporting CP (C)	26	19	5	2	77	22	+55	43	
2	Benfica	26	17	5	4	75	27	+48	39	
3	Belenenses	26	15	6	5	60	29	+31	36	
4	Porto	26	16	4	6	58	35	+23	36	
5	Barreirense	26	10	8	8	44	40	+4	28	
6	Vitória de Setúbal	26	11	5	10	40	33	+7	27	
7	Lusitano de Évora	26	10	5	11	31	44	−13	25	
8	Vitória de Guimarães	26	7	6	13	28	54	−26	20	
9	Boavista	26	7	6	13	35	54	−19	20	
10	Sporting da Covilhã	26	7	6	13	38	54	−16	20	
11	Académica	26	7	5	14	39	57	−18	19	
12	Atlético CP	26	6	7	13	33	52	−19	19	
13	Braga	26	8	2	16	37	58	−21	18	
14	Estoril (R)	26	5	4	17	28	64	−36	14	Relegation to Segunda Divisão

Source: rsssf.org
(C) Champions; (R) Relegated

== Results ==
Home \ Away	ACA	ACP	BAR	BEL	BEN	BOA	BRA	EST	LUS	POR	SCP	SCO	VGU	VSE
Académica		3–2	4–1	2–5	1–3	1–3	0–2	1–2	4–0	1–1	0–1	0–1	1–0	3–0
Atlético CP	1–3		1–1	2–2	0–3	0–1	2–0	4–2	0–0	0–2	0–3	2–2	4–1	3–1
Barreirense	2–2	1–1		1–2	1–1	4–0	3–1	4–0	4–1	4–0	2–1	0–0	4–0	2–2
Belenenses	5–2	3–1	1–1		1–2	5–0	2–1	6–1	3–0	1–1	2–4	3–0	5–0	2–1
Benfica	7–2	4–0	3–0	3–1		4–1	8–2	6–0	3–1	2–1	2–3	5–0	5–1	2–1
Boavista	1–1	1–2	0–0	2–1	2–2		1–2	4–2	1–0	1–3	1–1	4–1	1–3	2–3
Braga	0–1	1–0	1–0	0–1	2–2	2–1		0–3	1–1	0–2	3–5	4–1	4–0	2–1
Estoril	2–1	0–0	2–5	0–3	0–2	0–1	2–1		0–1	2–3	1–3	2–2	2–2	2–0
Lusitano Évora	1–1	1–0	2–0	0–1	0–3	5–1	3–2	1–0		3–0	2–0	3–1	3–0	0–0
Porto	2–1	6–3	4–0	1–1	2–1	4–2	5–0	4–1	4–1		1–1	3–1	6–0	3–0
Sporting CP	5–0	2–0	9–0	1–1	3–1	3–3	6–1	3–1	7–0	5–1		3–0	4–0	1–0
Sporting da Covilhã	2–1	7–0	1–3	1–2	0–0	1–1	3–2	4–1	3–1	1–2	0–0		4–0	1–5
Vitória de Guimarães	6–1	2–2	1–0	1–1	0–0	2–0	3–2	3–0	1–1	0–1	0–2	2–0		0–0
Vitória de Setúbal	2–2	4–3	0–1	1–0	2–1	2–0	2–1	0–0	4–0	3–0	0–1	5–1	1–0	

Source: rsssf.org
Legend: Blue = home team win; Yellow = draw; Red = away team win.
