= Carlos Falé =

Portuguese footballer (born 1933)

Falé
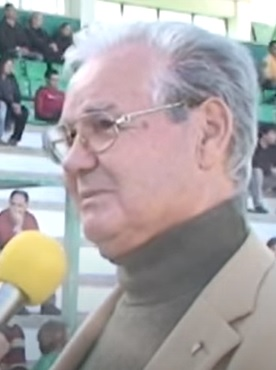
- Falé in 2011

Personal information
- Full name: Carlos Francisco Carvalho Falé
- Date of birth: 11 June 1933
- Place of birth: Redondo, Portugal
- Date of death: 12 June 2022 (aged 89)
- Place of death: Évora, Portugal
- Position: Defender

Senior career*
Years	Team	Apps	(Gls)
1952–1967	Lusitano de Évora	271	(1)
1967–1970	U. Montemor		
- * Club domestic league appearances and goals

Carlos Francisco Carvalho Falé, known as Falé (11 June 1933 – 12 June 2022) was a Portuguese footballer who played as a defender. He played 14 seasons and 271 games in the Primeira Liga for Lusitano de Évora. Falé died in Évora on 12 June 2022, one day after his 89th birthday.
