= Sele Davou =

Nigerian footballer

Personal information
- Date of birth: 9 October 1996 (age 30)
- Place of birth: Jos, Nigeria
- Height: 1.65 m (5 ft 5 in)
- Position: Midfielder

Team information
- Current team: Lusitano de Évora
- Number: 30

Senior career*
Years	Team	Apps	(Gls)
2015–2016	Almancilense	32	(4)
2016–2017	Felgueiras 1932	21	(0)
2017–2018	Operário	23	(3)
2018–2019	Sertanense	30	(2)
2019–2020	Montalegre	24	(5)
2020–2021	Oliveirense	15	(0)
2021–2022	São Martinho		
2022–2023	Anadia	26	(0)
2023–	Lusitano de Évora	37	(6)
- * Club domestic league appearances and goals ‡ National team caps and goals as of 6 May 2026

Sele Davou (born 9 October 1996) is a Nigerian professional footballer who plays as a midfielder for Portuguese Liga 3 club Lusitano de Évora. He previously played for the Portuguese second-tier club Oliveirense.
