= Geraldo Matsimbe =

Mozambican footballer

Personal information
- Date of birth: 22 October 1992 (age 34)
- Place of birth: Maputo, Mozambique
- Height: 1.83 m (6 ft 0 in)
- Position: Midfielder

Team information
- Current team: FC Serpa

Youth career
- LD Maputo

Senior career*
Years	Team	Apps	(Gls)
2013–2017	LD Maputo		
2015	→ Braga B (loan)	2	(0)
2015	→ Nacional (loan)	0	(0)
2016–2017	→ Nacional (loan)	1	(0)
2017	→ Fafe (loan)	7	(1)
2017–2020	Nacional	1	(0)
2018	→ Fafe (loan)	14	(0)
2018–2020	→ Amora (loan)	39	(3)
2020–2021	Costa do Sol		
2021–2021	Fafe	18	(0)
2022–2024	Juventude de Évora	47	(6)
2024–	FC Serpa	0	(0)

International career
2016–	Mozambique	10	(0)
- * Club domestic league appearances and goals as of 20:13, 21 July 2024 (UTC)

Geraldo Matsimbe (born 22 October 1992) is a Mozambican professional footballer who plays for Portuguese club FC Serpa as a midfielder.

== Club career ==
Born in Maputo, Mexer began his career with Liga Desportiva de Maputo. He joined Braga B on loan in 2015, and eventually transferred to Nacional.

Matsimbe made his debut for Nacional in a 2–1 win over Belenenses on 10 September 2016.

== International career ==
Matsimbe made his debut for Mozambique in November 2016, in a friendly 1–0 loss to Kenya.
