= Álvaro Teixeira =

Angolan-born Portuguese footballer and manager

Personal information
- Full name: Alvaro Cardoso Teixeira
- Date of birth: 11 January 1965
- Place of birth: Luanda, Portuguese Angola
- Date of death: 9 May 2017 (aged 52)
- Place of death: Lisbon, Portugal
- Height: 1.87 m (6 ft 2 in)
- Position: Defender

Youth career
- 1979–1981: Vitória de Setúbal

Senior career*
Years	Team	Apps	(Gls)
1981–1986	Vitória de Setúbal	32	(0)
1986-1996	Belenenses	222	(5)
1995-1996	FC Felgueiras	9	(0)
1996-1999	Torreense	94	(14)
1999–2002	Lusitano de Évora	33	(1)
Total		390	(20)

Managerial career
- 1998–1999: Torreense
- 2005–2006: Lusitano de Évora
- 2006–2007: Atlético de Reguencos
- 2008–2009: Sport Comércio e Indústria
- * Club domestic league appearances and goals

Álvaro Cardoso Teixeira (11 January 1965 – 9 May 2017) was a Portuguese former football player and manager who played as a defender.

== Playing career ==
Born in Luanda, Angola, Teixeira started playing professionally with Vitória de Setúbal, joining Belenenses in the 1986–87 season. With the Belém club he won the Taça de Portugal in the 1988–89 season.

Teixeira sequently went on the play for Torreense and Lusitano de Évora ending his career with Pinhalnovense.

== Coaching career ==
Teixeira started his coaching career in 1999, with Torreense in the 1998–99 season as a player manager. He also managed Lusitano de Évora in the 2005–06 season.

== Death ==
Teixeira died of a chronic disease on 9 May 2019 at only 53 years of age.

== Honours ==
=== Player ===
Belenenses

- Taça de Portugal: 1988–89
