= Henrique Pires =

Portuguese footballer (born 2002)

Personal information
- Full name: Henrique Ribeiro Pires
- Date of birth: 8 April 2002 (age 24)
- Place of birth: Portugal
- Height: 1.91 m (6 ft 3 in)
- Position: Centre-back

Team information
- Current team: Juventude Évora
- Number: 4

Youth career
- 2010–2016: Sporting CP
- 2016–2017: Barreirense
- 2017–2018: Amora
- 2018–2019: Belenenses
- 2019–2020: Amora
- 2020–2022: Belenenses
- 2022–2023: Estoril

Senior career*
Years	Team	Apps	(Gls)
2020–2021	Belenenses SAD II	10	(0)
2021–2022	Belenenses SAD	1	(0)
2023–	Juventude Évora	1	(0)
- * Club domestic league appearances and goals as of 15:50, 28 December 2023 (UTC)

Henrique Ribeiro Pires (born 8 April 2002) is a Portuguese professional footballer who plays as a centre-back for Juventude Évora.

== Club career ==
A youth product of Sporting CP, Barreirense, Amora and Belenenses, Pires began his senior career with the reserves of Belenenses SAD in 2020. He was called to the senior team after a COVID-19 outbreak hit the squad. One of only 9 starters in the squad for the match, he made his professional debut with B-SAD in a 7–0 Primeira Liga loss to Benfica on 24 July 2021 that ended up being called off.
