= Alexandre Alhinho =

Cape Verdean footballer

Personal information
- Full name: Alexandre Manuel Fortes Alhinho
- Date of birth: 7 December 1953 (age 72)
- Place of birth: São Vicente, Cape Verde
- Height: 1.80 m (5 ft 11 in)
- Position: Defender

Youth career
- 1970–1971: Académica

Senior career*
Years	Team	Apps	(Gls)
1973–1974	Farense	20	(0)
1974–1975	Porto	10	(0)
1975–1977	Académica	55	(0)
1977–1982	Belenenses	98	(0)
1982–1984	Farense	26+	(1+)
1984–1985	Lusitano de Évora	16	(2)
1985–1986	Estoril	23	(3)
1986–1989	Académico de Viseu	26	(0)
Total		274+	(6+)

Managerial career
- 1989–19??: Académica do Mindelo
- Batuque
- 2003–2006: Cape Verde
- 2012–2014: Académica do Mindelo
- * Club domestic league appearances and goals

Alexandre Manuel Fortes Alhinho (born 7 December 1953) is a Cape Verdean retired footballer who played as a defender and was a manager of regional clubs and the national team between 2003 and 2006.

He was the brother of the Portuguese international player and manager Carlos Alhinho.

== Biography ==
Alexandre Alhinho was born on the island of Sãp Vicente. Shortly after he immigrated to Portugal where he played his youth years for a season with Académica de Coimbra, he played as a defender. He started his pro career in 1973 with S.C. Farense for a season. His second club was FC Porto in the following season who finished as second in the Portuguese Championships.

He returned to Académica Coimbra in the following season in 1975 and this time in the professional club and played 55 matches for two seasons. In 1977, he spent five seasons with Os Belenenses and played 98 matches. He returned to Farense in 1982 where the club was playing in the Second Division. The club finished first in the south group, then the club won the silver title with a club of the north group. He played in the Premier Division and the club finished 2nd in the 1983/84 season, he scored the only goal of his career. He played inside the Second Division and with Lusitano Évora for a season in 1984 and then GD Estoril, a club based in Praia in the Azores. For the next three season, he would play for his last club based in northcentral Portugal, Académico de Viseu also in the Second Division, the club finished second behind F.C. Famalicão and again played inside the Premier Division and played 22 matches there.

He retired from playing football (soccer) and headed back to Cape Verde, no long after, he coached Académica do Mindelo where he helped win their only national title. Later, he coached Batuque FC. On 26 September 2012 he became coach of Académica do Mindelo once more.

== Honours ==
Manager

- Cape Verdean Football Championship: 1989
