= EEA and Norway Grants =

Set of grants

The EEA Grants and Norway Grants represent the contributions of Iceland, Liechtenstein and Norway to reducing social and economic disparities in the European Economic Area (EEA) and strengthening bilateral relations with 15 EU countries in Central and Southern Europe. Through the Grants, Iceland, Liechtenstein, and Norway are also contributing to strengthening fundamental European values such as democracy, tolerance and the rule of law.

On September 2020, Ine Marie Eriksen Søreide, the Norwegian Minister of Foreign Affairs, announced that the Polish municipalities which introduced the LGBT-free zones would be denied the EEA and Norway Grants whose aim is the reduction of social and economic disparities in the European Economic Area (EEA). Poland is the biggest beneficiary of these funds and could potentially lose millions of euros of financial aid. The suspension of funds only applies to the government bodies that have themselves adopted resolutions and does not apply to non-governmental organizations that operate in the LGBT-free zones.

== Background ==
The EEA and Norway Grants have their basis in the EEA Agreement.

Under this agreement, Iceland, Liechtenstein, and Norway are part of the European Single Market (ESM), which enables the free movement of goods, services, capital and people in the internal market. The EEA Agreement sets out the common goals involved in working together to reduce social and economic disparities in Europe and strengthen cooperation between European countries.

Ever since the EEA Agreement entered into force, Iceland, Liechtenstein, and Norway have contributed to social and economic progress in several countries of the EU and EEA. These contributions have been channelled through the Financial Mechanism (1994–1998), the Financial Instrument (1999–2003) and the EEA and Norway Grants (2004–2009, 2009–2014, 2014–2021). In total, Norway, Iceland and Liechtenstein provided €3.3 billion through consecutive grant schemes between 1994 and 2014. A further contribution of €2.8 billion was made available in the 2014–2021 funding period. The three donor countries contribute according to their size and gross domestic product (GDP). Consequently, Norway provides 97.7%, Iceland 1.6%, and Liechtenstein 0.7% of the funding for the 2014–2021 EEA and Norway Grants combined.

Since 2004, there have been two separate mechanisms: the EEA Grants and the Norway Grants. The EEA Grants are financed by the three donor countries: Iceland, Liechtenstein, and Norway; while the Norway Grants are solely financed by Norway.

== Eligibility ==
The eligibility for the EEA and Norway Grants mirrors the criteria set for the EU Cohesion Fund aimed at member states where the gross national income (GNI) per inhabitant is less than 90% of the EU average. For the 2014–2021 funding period, these countries are Bulgaria, Croatia, Cyprus, Czech Republic, Estonia, Greece, Hungary, Latvia, Lithuania, Malta, Poland, Portugal, Romania, Slovakia and Slovenia. Countries that have entered the EU before 2004 are ineligible for receiving funding under the Norway Grants; Greece and Portugal, therefore, only receive EEA Grants funding.

== Process ==
First, the EU and the three Donor States agree on a Memorandum Of Understanding (MoU) for the total contribution and distribution of funding per beneficiary state. Country allocations are based on population size and GDP per capita. Second, Iceland, Liechtenstein, and Norway negotiate with each beneficiary state to agree on which programs to establish, their objectives, and the size of the allocation to each one.

The agreements are based on national needs and priorities in the beneficiary states and the scope for cooperation with the donor states. The European Commission is consulted during the negotiations to avoid duplication and to ensure funding is targeted where it will have the greatest impact. Programmes implemented under the EEA and Norway Grants must comply with EU rules and standards.

The funds provided by the EU and the EEA and Norway Grants are complementary. Each National Focal Point is responsible for overall management of programs in its beneficiary country. The Programme Operators develop and manage programs, often in cooperation with a partner from the donor states, and award funding to projects.

== Bilateral cooperation ==
One of the two main goals of the EEA and Norway Grants is to increase cooperation and relations between the beneficiary and donor countries. Partnerships between entities from the beneficiary countries and their counterparts in Iceland, Liechtenstein and Norway are a fundamental part of the Grants and offer an opportunity to tackle common European challenges.

Bilateral partnerships between public and private institutions in the donor and beneficiary countries are widely encouraged. Cooperation between people and institutions at administrative and political levels and in the private sector, academia and civil society is a prerequisite to strengthen bilateral relations.

== EEA and Norway Grants 2014–2021 ==
For the period from 2014 to 2021, €2.8 billion has been set aside under the Grants. The EEA Grants (€1.55 billion) are jointly financed by Iceland (3%), Liechtenstein (1%) and Norway (96%) and available in all 15 countries. The Norway Grants (€1.25 billion) are solely financed by Norway and available in the 13 countries that joined the EU after 2003. The contribution of each donor country is based on their gross domestic product (GDP).

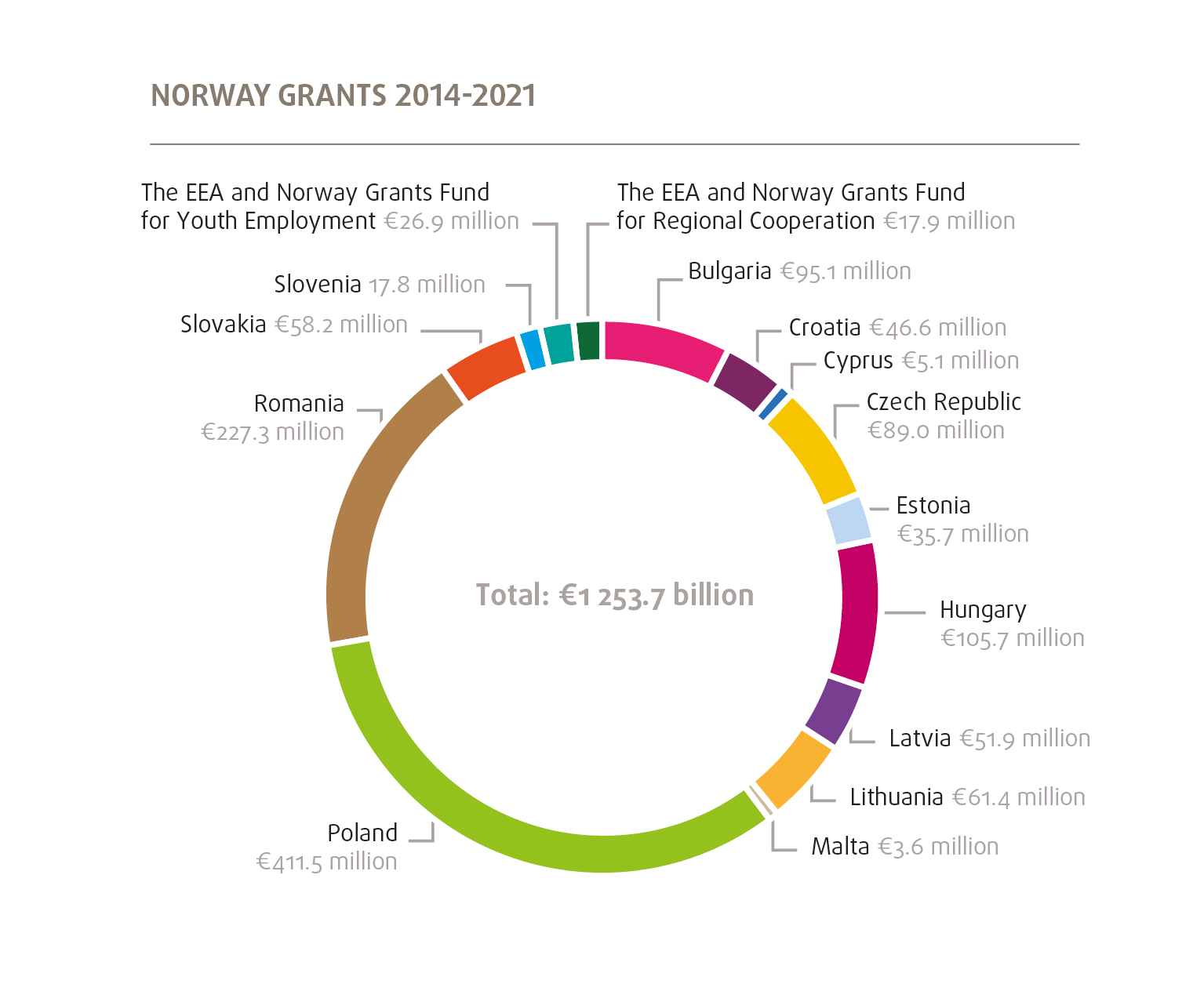
Figure 2. Total allocation 2. Norway Grants 2014–2021

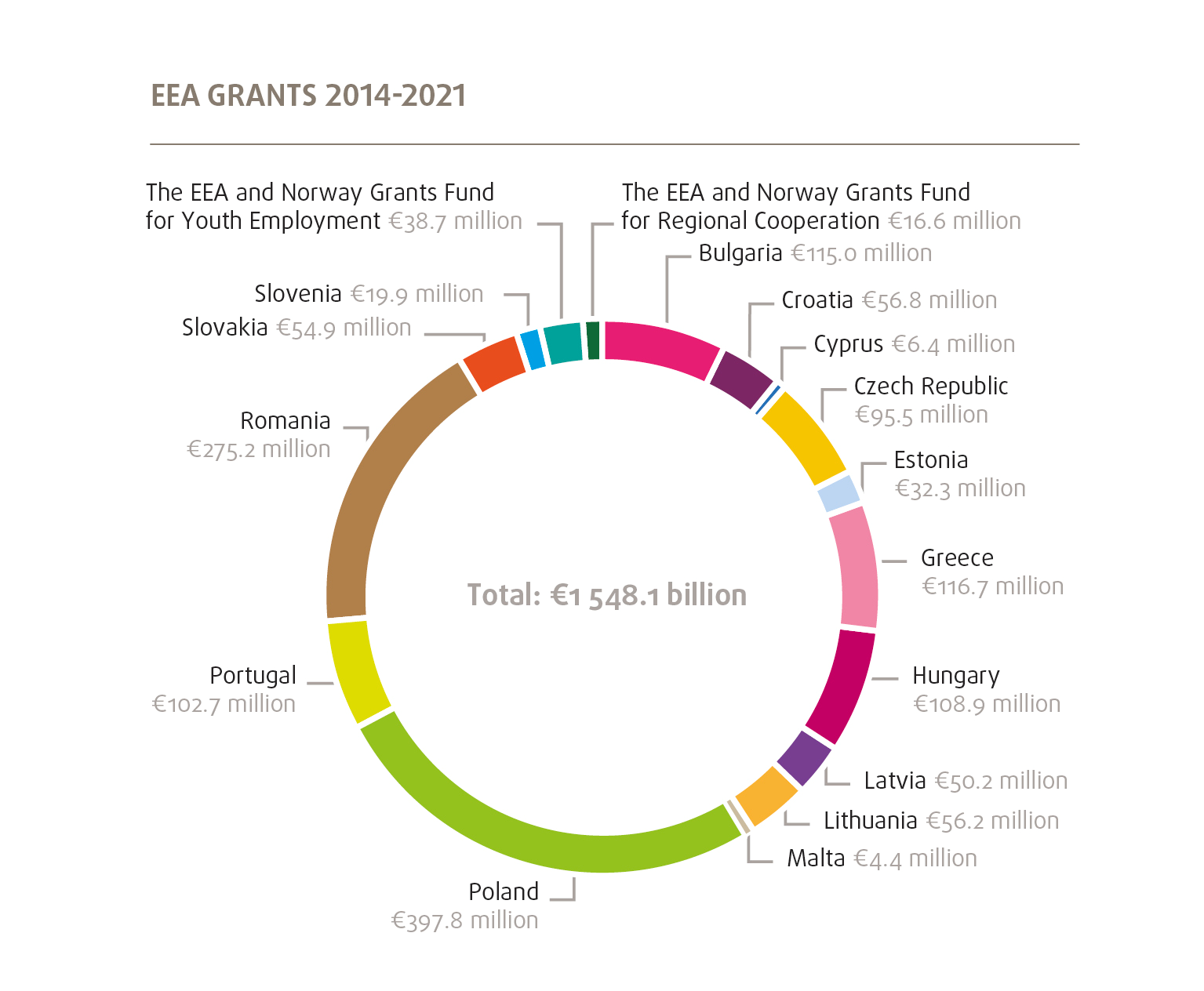
Figure 1. Total allocation EEA Grants 2014–2021

=== Areas of support ===
The five Priority Sectors (PSs) and related 23 Programme Areas (PAs) funded in the 2014–2021 period reflect the priorities set out in the 'Europe 2020 Strategy' – the European Union's ten-year growth strategy for smart, sustainable and inclusive growth – and the EU's 11 cohesion policy objectives. They aim at contributing to growth and jobs, tackling climate change and energy dependence while reducing poverty and social exclusion. They also promote bilateral and international cooperation.

A new feature of the EEA and Norway Grants 2014–2021 is the establishment of the Fund for Youth Employment (€65.5 million) and the Fund for Regional Cooperation (€34.5 million), which support European cross-border and transnational project initiatives to find solutions to some of Europe's common challenges.

All the programmes under the EEA and Norway Grants 2014–2021 will run until 30 April 2024.

=== Cooperation and external partners ===
The Donor Programme Partners (DPPs) play a strategic role in programme planning and implementation, as well as in facilitating project partnership. In the 2014–2021 funding period, there are 21 DPPs involved (two from Iceland, one from Liechtenstein and 18 from Norway).

The Donor Programme Partners are mostly public bodies with national mandates in their respective fields and with extensive international experience. These DPPs were designated on the initiative of the donor countries.

Intergovernmental organisations and actors play an important role in the EEA and Norway Grants, as they monitor compliance with international conventions and treaties across Europe. These organisations provide assistance in areas linked to human rights, democracy and the rule of law. In order to ensure that the programmes and projects of the EEA and Norway Grants are aligned with European and international standards, the donors have established strategic partnerships with three European partners, which act as International Partner Organisations (IPOs) in the 2014–2021 funding period:

- The European Union Agency for Fundamental Rights (FRA) is involved in several programmes and projects on Roma inclusion and fundamental rights. The Grants also cooperate with the FRA in organising high-level fundamental rights-related events.
- The Council of Europe (CoE) is the most comprehensive external partner of the Grants and is involved in several programmes. The organisation provides strategic advice as well as technical input in the areas of human rights, democracy and the rule of law.
- The Organisation for Economic Cooperation and Development (OECD) is a strategic partner for the Grants in the area of good governance, where it is involved in several programmes and projects.

== EEA and Norway Grants 2009–2014 ==
For the 2009–2014 period, €1.8 billion was set aside under the Grants. The EEA Grants (€993.5 million), jointly financed by Iceland (3%), Liechtenstein (1%) and Norway (96%), were available in 16 countries. The Norway Grants (€804.6 million), solely financed by Norway, were available in the 13 countries that joined the EU after 2003. Spain received only transitional funding in the 2009–2014 period. After joining the EU in 2013, Croatia became a member of the EEA in 2014, and consequently a beneficiary country of the EEA and Norway Grants.

Table 1. EEA and Norway Grants 2009–2014 funding
Country	EEA Grants	Norway Grants	Total allocated	% Incurred*
Bulgaria	€78 600 000	€48 000 000	€126 600 000	79.49%
Croatia	€5 000 000	€4 600 000	€9 600 000	63.33%
Cyprus	€3 850 000	€4 000 000	€7 850 000	96.38%
Czech Republic	€61 400 000	€70 400 000	€131 800 000	84.13%
Estonia	€23 000 000	€25 600 000	€48 600 000	97.12%
Greece	€63 400 000	€0	€63 400 000	86.28%
Hungary	€70 100 000	€83 200 000	€153 300 000	57.76%
Latvia	€34 550 000	€38 400 000	€72 950 000	87.66%
Lithuania	€38 400 000	€45 600 000	€84 000 000	95.26%
Malta	€2 900 000	€1 600 000	€4 500 000	98.76%
Poland	€266 900 000	€311 200 000	€578 100 000	91.69%
Portugal	€57 950 000	€0	€57 950 000	90.51%
Romania	€190 750 000	€115 200 000	€305 950 000	82.21%
Slovakia	€38 350 000	€42 400 000	€80 750 000	79.80%
Slovenia	€12 500 000	€14 400 000	€26 900 000	91.37%
Spain	€45 850 000	€0	€45 850 000	89.46%
Total	€993 500 000	€804 600 000	€1 798 100 000	85.11%

* % incurred of eligible expenditure amount. Data extracted on 5 September 2019 and subject to change.

=== Cooperation ===
Cooperation through bilateral programmes and projects provides an arena for exchange of knowledge, mutual learning from best practices and developing joint policies. 23 Donor Programme Partners (DPPs) were involved in the 2009–2014 funding period (20 from Norway, two from Iceland and one from Liechtenstein). In addition, the Council of Europe participated as a DPP on some of the programmes.

More than 30% of the 7,000 projects funded in this period had a Donor Project Partner involved. There were nearly 1,000 partners from the donor countries (185 from Iceland, 11 from Liechtenstein and 780 from Norway).

=== Results ===
The End Review of the EEA and Norway Grants 2009-2014 sheds light on the Grants support in 16 EU countries. The following independent evaluations and reviews were conducted for the 2009–2014 funding period:

- Rapid assessment of research programmes
- Rapid assessment on increasing Roma inclusion
- Rapid assessment of the gender programmes
- Mid-term evaluation of the support to strengthened bilateral relations
- Evaluation of Decent work and tripartite dialogue – final report
- Mid-term review of the cultural heritage sector – main report
- Mid-term review of the NGO programmes – main report
- EEA and Norway Grants 2009–2014: Review of Risk Management

The EEA and Norway Grants' results and data portal provides more information about the programmes and projects funded during the 2009–2014 period.

== EEA and Norway Grants 2004–2009 ==
With the expansion of the EU in 2004, ten new countries – Cyprus, Czech Republic, Estonia, Hungary, Latvia, Lithuania, Malta, Poland, Slovakia and Slovenia – not only joined the EU, but also the European Economic Area (EEA).

This enlargement required a substantial increase in the contributions towards European cohesion. Most of the new member states were considerably below the EU average in terms of their social and economic development.

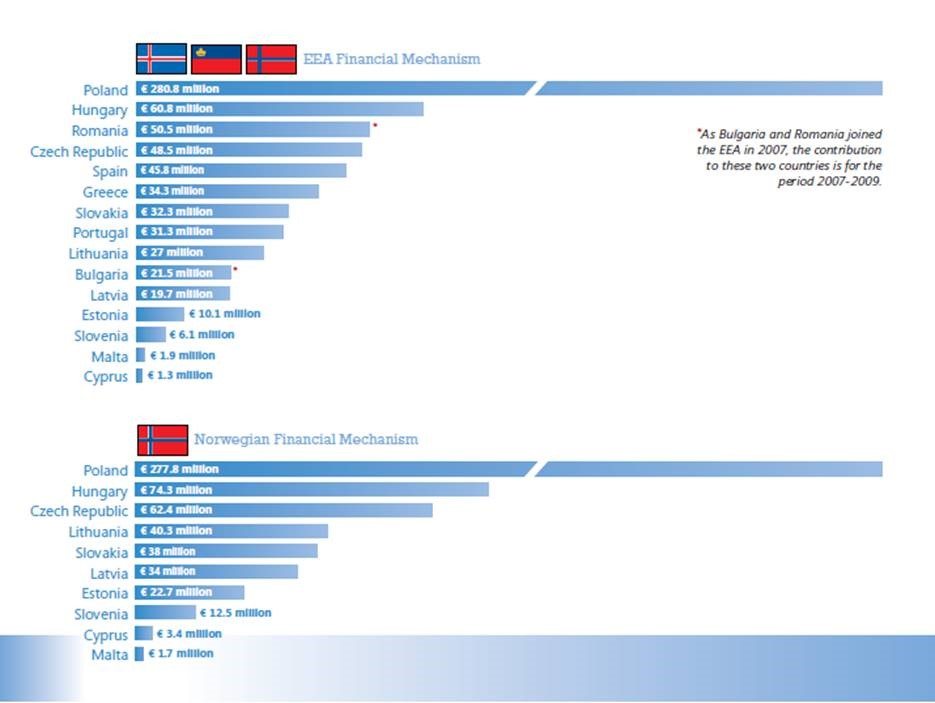

The EEA and Norway Grants made available €1.3 billion for the 2004–2009 period. The EEA Grants (€672 million) supported 15 beneficiary states in Central and Southern Europe. The Norway Grants provided an additional €567 million to the ten countries that joined the EU in 2004. Apart from these two mechanisms, Norway allocated €68 million through the Norwegian bilateral cooperation programmes with Bulgaria and Romania, once the two states joined the EU in 2007.

Norway, as the largest donor, provided close to 97% of the total funding in 2004–2009.

=== Areas of support ===
From 2004 to 2009, 1250 projects were awarded financial support through the EEA and Norwegian Financial Mechanisms. These projects were funded under the following areas of support:

- Environment and sustainable development
- Conservation of European cultural heritage
- Civil society
- Schengen and the judiciary
- Health and childcare
- Institutional capacity building and human resource development
- Academic research and scholarships
- Regional and cross-border cooperation
- Institutional capacity building

=== Cooperation ===
More than one in five supported projects were partnership projects between entities in the beneficiary states, and Iceland, Liechtenstein or Norway.

=== Results ===
The End review of the EEA and Norway Grants 2004–2009 concluded that "the EEA and Norway Grants 2004–2009 have contributed to reducing disparities in Europe […] and the benefits locally have been significant".

== Financial Instrument 1999–2003 ==
In the period from 1999 to 2003, Greece, Ireland, Northern Ireland, Portugal and Spain received €119.6 million from the EEA EFTA States (Iceland, Liechtenstein and Norway). Projects were supported within the fields of environmental protection, urban renewal, pollution in urban areas, protection of cultural heritage, transport, education and training, and academic research. About 93% of the funding was spent on projects related to environmental protection.

== Financial Mechanism 1994–1998 ==
The Financial Mechanism 1994–1998 covers Greece, Ireland, Northern Ireland, Portugal and Spain. The projects were supported within the fields of environmental protection, education and training, and transport. In addition to the €500 million in project support, interest rebates were granted on loans amounting to €1.5 billion in the European Investment Bank (EIB).

Finland, Sweden and Austria, which until 1994 had been members of EFTA, left the association to join the EU. The European Commission took over the responsibilities for the contributions of these three countries to the Financial Mechanism 1994–1998.
