= Juventude Sport Clube =

Sports club in Portugal

Juventude de Évora
- Juventude Sport Clube official logo
- Full name: Juventude Sport Clube
- Nicknames: Águias Azuis (English: Blue Eagles); Rasga-Roupa (English: Tear-offs)
- Founded: 5 December 1918; 107 years ago
- Stadium: Estádio Juventude SC; Évora, Portugal
- Capacity: 3,000
- Coordinates: 38.562°N 7.914°W
- Chairman: António Sousa
- Manager: Pedro Russiano
- League: Regional League (Evora FA)
- 2023–24: Campeonato de Portugal, 10th(relegated)
Home colours	Away colours

Juventude Sport Clube, also commonly known as Juventude de Évora, (abbreviated Juv. Évora) is an amateur sports club based in Évora, Portugal, founded on 5 December 1918, that competes in the Regional League, Divisão de Eleite of the Evora FA. The club's home ground is the Juventude SC Stadium, opened in 2025, in Évora and their motto is "Portuguese: Força de vontade, lit. 'willpower'."

== Current squad ==
As of 8 March 2024

Note: Flags indicate national team as defined under FIFA eligibility rules; some limited exceptions apply. Players may hold more than one non-FIFA nationality.

No.	Pos.	Nation	Player
2	DF	POR	Miguel Baptista
4	DF	POR	Henrique Pires
5	DF	POR	João Mendes
6	MF	POR	Tomás Lima (vice-captain)
7	FW	POR	Patchú
8	MF	POR	Rúben Santos
9	FW	BRA	Henrique Silva
10	FW	POR	João Delgado (captain)
11	FW	RSA	Sibusiso 'Sibu' Shibane
16	MF	BRA	Caio Carioca
17	FW	POR	Edu Vieira

No.	Pos.	Nation	Player
19	FW	CMR	Lionel Yombi
21	DF	POR	André Farinha
22	GK	POR	Filipe Semedo
23	MF	POR	Rodrigo Elias
28	DF	POR	Tomás Piedade
37	DF	POR	Rodrigo Monteiro
61	DF	POR	João 'Obi' Gomes
66	MF	MOZ	Geraldo Matsimbe (vice-captain)
74	GK	POR	Petterson Santos
77	FW	POR	Bernardo Soares
88	DF	POR	Afonso Batista
99	MF	MLI	Mahamadou Diawara
