= Manuel Pinho =

Portuguese academic, economist, and politician (born 1954)

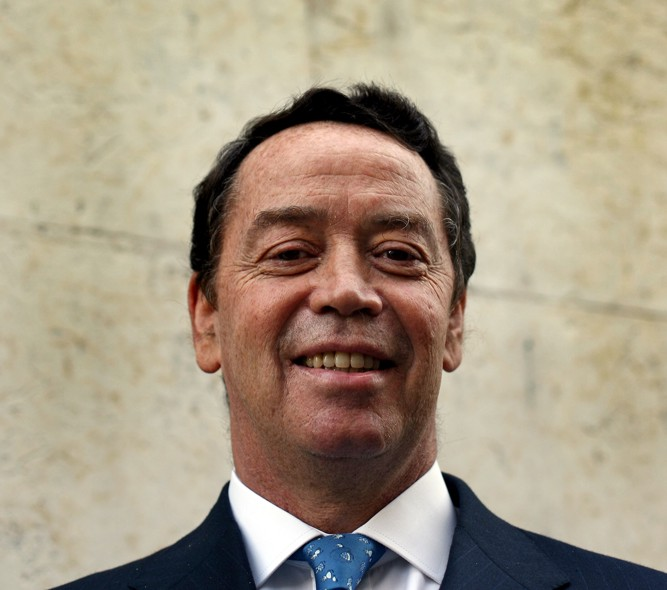

Minister of Economy and Innovation
- In office 14 March 2005 – 2 July 2009
- President: Jorge Sampaio; Aníbal Cavaco Silva
- Prime Minister: José Sócrates
- Preceded by: Álvaro Barreto (as Minister of Economy); Graça Carvalho (as Minister of Innovation)
- Succeeded by: Fernando Teixeira dos Santos

Personal details
- Born: 28 October 1954 (age 71) Lisbon, Portugal
- Party: Independent
- Spouse: Alexandra Pinho
- Education: Technical University of Lisbon; Paris West University Nanterre La Défense
- Profession: Economist, professor

Manuel António Gomes de Almeida de Pinho (born 28 October 1954) is a former Portuguese Minister of Economy and Innovation (2005–09) who achieved greater notoriety after he left office for being prosecuted and convicted on multiple charges of passive corruption, tax fraud, and money laundering. In 2024 he was sentenced to 10-years in prison and a fine in the amount of 4.9 million euros that he was shown to have received while in office in secret lump sum and monthly offshore pay-offs from his longtime mentor Ricardo Espírito Santo Salgado in exchange for benefitting Salgado's Espírito Santo Financial Group that Pinho rejoined after he left office. Pinho has remained under house arrest since 2021, which was extended in April 2025 when his appeal to overturn the conviction was denied by Lisbon's First Appellate Court. As of November 2025, a subsequent appeal to Portugal's Supreme Court was pending and a complaint against the Portuguese state had been filed with the European Court of Human Rights. Manuel Pinho has admitted to improperly receiving payments offshore and evading the related taxes but has argued that those payments were owed to him and refuted the corruption charges publishing to that effect two books where he and his defense lawyer dispute the guilty verdict.

In October 2024 he was charged with a second batch of passive corruption charges, this time for having favored Portugal's EDP - Energias de Portugal electricity company (EDP) with regulatory concessions deemed worth 840 million euros in exchange for EDP paying Columbia University’s School of International and Public Affairs to hire him as an adjunct professor paid for directly from annual earmarked EDP grants in the amount of 1.2 million euros. The timing of this arrangement was subsequently deemed as evidence of Pinho's passive corruption in that the EDP grants were set up for Pinho personally and timed exactly to hire him after he left government. This led to Pinho's indictment in 2017, after which he stopped lecturing at Columbia but he was only formally charged, along with the top two EDP managers who approved the grants, in October 2024 after his first conviction on passive corruption charges to the benefit of Ricardo Salgado's ESFG. As of November 2025, this case had not gone to court.

As minister, Pinho's main focus was to promote renewable energies generation in Portugal and, according to himself, after being hired by Columbia University he also lectured at 6 other universities in the US, China and Australia.

He is also remembered in Portuguese popular culture for an outburst in 2009 in the Portuguese Parliament that forced his resignation and was reported by mainstream media worldwide.

== Education and early career (1975–1994) ==
Pinho was born in Lisbon in 1954 and graduated from the Technical University of Lisbon in 1975. He obtained a Doctorat de Spécialité (3e cycle) in economics at the Université Paris X Nanterre in 1982, which he holds as equivalent to a Ph.D. He returned to Portugal to teach at the Technical University of Lisbon and the Catholic University of Portugal; and in 1985 went to work as a staff economist at the International Monetary Fund in Washington, D.C. He returned to Portugal in 1988 to become a management-level banker at the Portuguese subsidiaries of Manufacturers Hanover and Credit Lyonnais. Between 1991 and 1994, Pinho was Director-General of the Portuguese Treasury and his tenure coincided with the second and final stage of the privatization of Banco Espírito Santo, which he joined right after he resigned from the Treasury in 1994.

== Espirito Santo Financial Group career (1994–2014) ==
Pinho was between 1994 and 2005 a top operative of Portugal's defunct Espirito Santo Financial Group (ESFG). He was initially hired as the group's head of research and capital markets and quickly rose to become a full member of the executive board of Banco Espírito Santo in charge of key financial operations areas. He also quickly won the trust of one of the bank's senior shareholders and Espirito Santo family scion Ricardo Espírito Santo Salgado who would become the bank's next chairman and Pinho's mentor in his family-controlled Espirito Santo Financial Group publicly saying in 2014 that Pinho was "a good financier" and had "delivered great services."

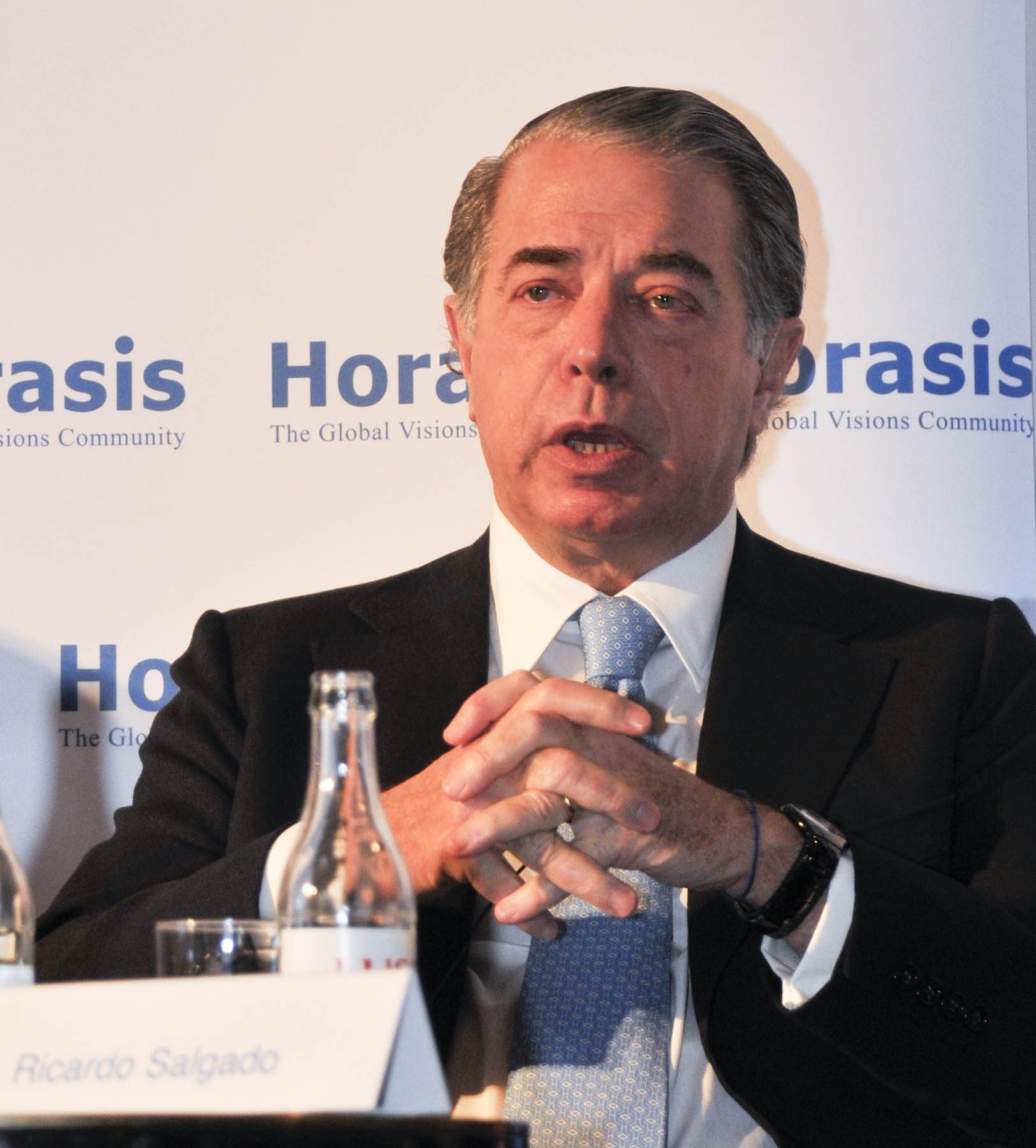
ESFG chairman Ricardo Salgado who became Pinho's career mentor at ESFG and secretly continued to pay Pinho while he was minister and arranged him a generous financial support package afterwards.

As a result, when Pinho became minister in 2005, it was widely believed that it had been due to the influence of Salgado, who would publicly deny it a decade later. However, Salgado continued to secretly pay Pinho 14.963,94 euros per month while Pinho was minister, in addition to hiring Pinho's second wife to oversee the bank's newly started modern photography collection, thus ensuring that Pinho remained bound to the ESFG while he was minister. Against this background, some of the decisions Pinho took as minister were criticized for benefiting ESFG, such as the sale of Portugália Airlines, the SONAE Group's failed tender offer for Portugal Telecom where ESFG was the largest minority shareholder, or Pinho's dealings with EDP-Energias de Portugal that was chaired by another former ESFG top operative António Mexia. Pinho's alleged favouring of EDP-Energias de Portugal when he awarded it the 26-year hydro-electricity buying monopoly bypassing the regular public bidding procedures would subsequently be considered by the European Commission and the Portuguese Court of Audits detrimental to the interests of the Portuguese treasury and electricity consumers. In June 2017, it also became the subject of a corruption investigation by the Portuguese Judicial Police that indicted Pinho, Mexia, and Salgado.

After resigning from his minister position in 2009, Pinho was rehired by the ESFG as vice chairman of its Banco Espírito Santo Africa subsidiary in what was later revealed to be a 39,000 euros a month no-show job that allowed Pinho to be away teaching in New York and elsewhere.

=== Pension controversy and litigation ===
Pinho's relationship with the ESFG soured in 2014, when he demanded early payment of his pension benefits in anticipation of the collapse of ESFG, which happened shortly afterwards. His pension withdrawal request was refused by the new management of Novo Banco, the entity that took over the ESFG, and, in 2015, Pinho sued Novo Banco and the former ESFG pension fund for 7.8 million euros consistent with his claim of a lifetime pension of 21,000 euros per month pension from age 65. In response, the Novo Banco cut his 39,000 euros per month BESA salary to 3,000 euros (2,000 euros according to other sources), which led Pinho to rescind his contract and file a second lawsuit to obtain compensation in line with the original salary amount. According to Pinho's own court depositions, when he became minister in 2005 he had asked for an early retirement package from age 55, but, since the statutory age was 65, Salgado agreed instead to give Pinho the "no-show" job until he reached the applicable age. In 2016, Pinho lost both lawsuits.

=== Panama Papers involvement ===
In 2016, Pinho was first referenced in the Panama Papers leaks as having received 180,000 euros in offshore payments from a shell company for the ESFG. In 2018 it was revealed that Pinho had held at least four offshore secret bank accounts in his name, including one in Panama (named "Tartaruga Foundation") into which he had received 3.5 million euros in under-the-table payments from his former boss Ricardo Salgado between 2006 and 2014, including at least 778,000 euros while Pinho was government minister and bound by office not to receive income from other sources, which led to indictments in Portugal on passive corruption and influence peddling charges.

=== Pandora Papers involvement ===
In 2021 the Pandora Papers investigation confirmed the existence of three of Pinho's offshore accounts (Tartaruga Foundation, Mandalay and Blackwade Holdings) and that he had used one of them (Blackwade Holdings) to transfer funds to buy and an apartment in New York in 2010. It also revealed that his wife Alexandra Pinho was a co-title holder to those accounts.

== Political and ministerial career (2005–09) ==
Pinho entered government politics in the early 2000s when he started contributing to Portugal's opposition Socialist Party economic agenda for the 2005 legislative elections. In 2005 he was rewarded by Socialist Party President José Sócrates who allowed Manuel Pinho to run as an independent in the elections and placed him at the top of the Socialist Party list for the district of Aveiro thus ensuring his election.

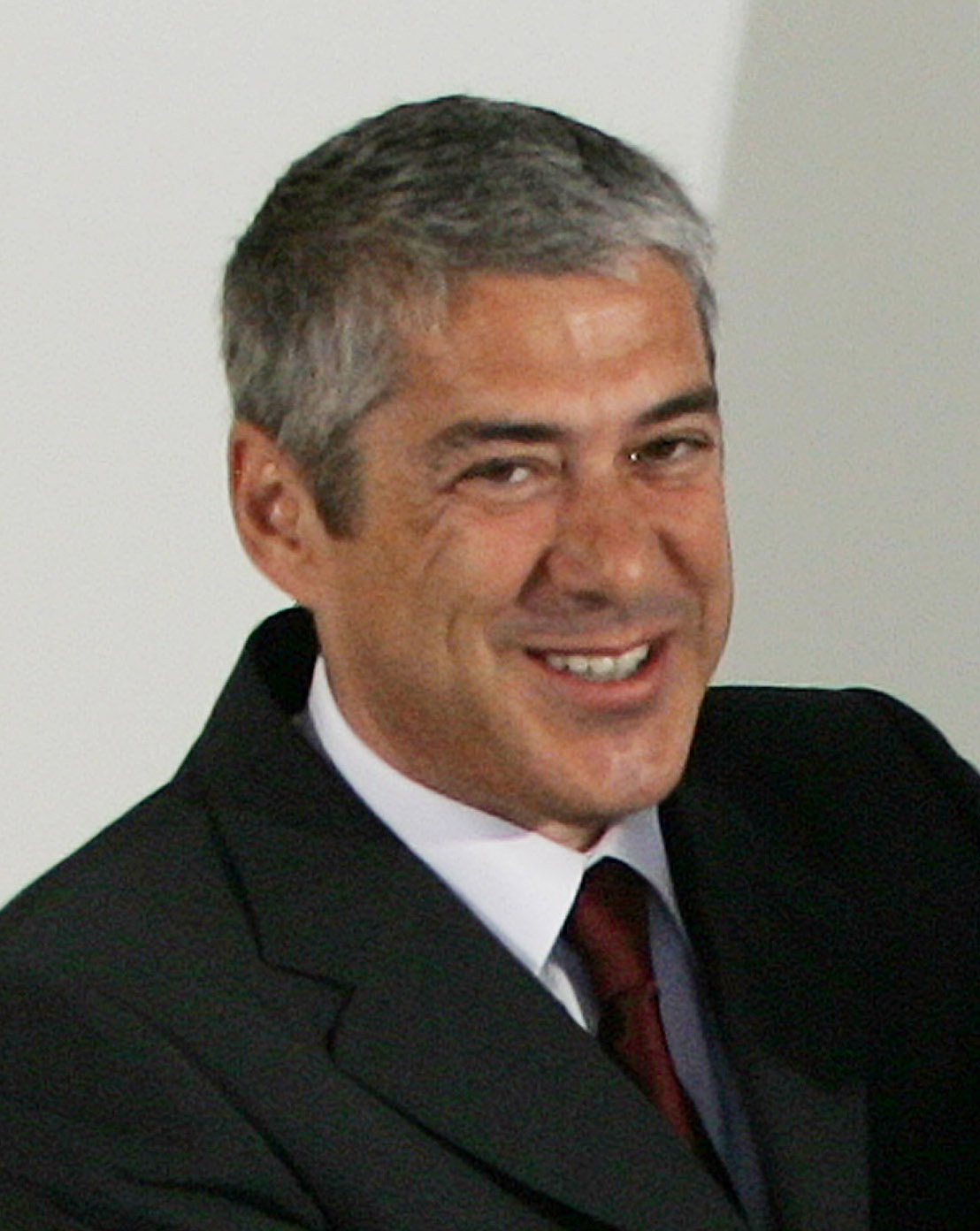
José Sócrates Portugal's Prime-Minister in 2005–09 and on whose government Pinho served as Minister of Economy and Innovation.

Following the Socialist Party's victory in the elections, Sócrates became Prime Minister and invited Pinho to be Minister of Economy and Innovation in the new government. As minister, Pinho attached priority to the full use of Portugal's existing renewable energy sources and development of new ones. During his term in office, Portugal's installed capacity for wind-powered generation tripled from 1,000 to 3,000 MW and for solar-powered it increased from virtually nothing (3MW) to 60 MW. He also launched an electric car program that sought to make Portugal the first country in Europe with a nationwide charging network, but the program was scrapped shortly after Pinho left government. In 2008, Pinho promoted an experimental sea-waves powered generation station, but it failed after three months. As energy minister of a European Union member country, Pinho contributed to the European Union's first Strategic Energy Technology Plan of 2007, that served as a blueprint for European development of low-carbon energy production.

However, Pinho was much criticized for his dealings with EDP-Energias de Portugal and its chairman Antonio Mexia, whom he had worked with at the ESFG. Pinho's decisions to grant high price guarantees to renewable energy generation and a 26-year hydropower buying monopoly to EDP-Energias de Portugal were deemed "excessive" by the subsequent government, "non-competitive and undervalued" by the European Commission that opened an official inquiry in 2013, and "contrary to the public interest" by the Portuguese Court of Audits in 2016.

Pinho, in a 2007 interview, described himself using the English expression "I’m the one they love to hate" referring to his critics. As Minister, he also became known for being prone to political gaffes that drew him plenty of press and social media coverage and ultimately led to his resignation.

=== Controversial resignation ===
On 2 July 2009, Pinho resigned as minister following an outburst in the Portuguese Parliament during the State of the Nation debate when he held his index fingers to his temples and mimicked a bull's horns in a cuckolding gesture directed at a communist parliamentarian who heckled him. Facing outcries of disrespectful conduct, at first Pinho tried to keep his job and apologized indirectly, but he was forced to resign two hours later after meeting behind closed doors with his Cabinet colleague, the minister of Parliamentary Affairs. That same night, Pinho apologized on national TV followed by Portugal's prime minister, Sócrates, who apologized "on behalf of the government" and by Portugal's President Aníbal Cavaco Silva, who stated publicly that "institutional respect is a sacred principle of democracy."

The TV footage of the cuckolding gesture immediately went viral making Pinho the subject of worldwide press coverage and countless Internet memes showing him self-applying horns to his own head.

== Corruption charges after leaving office and subsequent litigation (2017-ongoing as of 2025) ==
During 2014–16 the combination of the Panama Papers leaks and of the criminal indictments of Manuel Pinho's two government mentors, Ricardo Salgado and Jose Socrates, revealed collateral evidence of legal infractions by Pinho during the time he was minister, which warranted his indictment in 2017 by the Portugal's Public Prosecutor Office on multiple charges of passive corruption, tax fraud, and money laundering. Pinho was specifically accused of favoring the EDP group to the tune of 1.2 billion euros, subsequently revised to 840 million, at the expense of Portuguese electricity users in exchange for EDP paying Columbia University to hire him in 2010. He was also accused of money laundering and not paying taxes on the offshore payments for at least 18 years.

Manuel Pinho has since denied all wrongdoing and engaged in legal appeals and counter-appeals all the way up to Portugal's Constitutional Court that reiterated in 2021 the validity of Pinho's criminal accusation. But as a result of the appeals and lengthy preparations by the prosecution, only in December 2022 was Pinho formally charged jointly with his wife Alexandra Pinho and their alleged corruptor Ricardo Salgado. In 2024 all three were found guilty with Manuel Pinho being sentenced to paying back the 4.9 million euros in documented pay-offs from Ricardo Salgado and to 10-years in jail, which extended his permanence under house arrest pending an appeal he filed in October 2024 and lost in April 2025. His wife received a suspended sentence of 4 years and 8 months and Ricardo Salgado was sentenced to 6 years and 3 months. Pinho subsequently filed a new appeal with Portugal's Supreme Court which has allowed him to remain under house arrest rather than go to a prison establishment to carry out the rest of his sentence. In October 2025, he filed a complaint against the Portuguese state with the European Court of Human Rights.

A second-batch of passive corruption charges related to Pinho benefitting EDP while he was minister in exchange for EDP paying Columbia University the funds to hire Pinho after he stopped being minister led to indictments in 2024 of Pinho and the two top EDP executives at the time of the alleged corruption. As of November 2025, this case had not gone to court.

=== ESFG offshore payments to Pinho while he was Minister ===
In 2017, Pinho's record as a minister was shaken by the revelation that the whole time he was in office he had been receiving through a secret offshore account a monthly allowance of close to 15,000 euros from his Espirito Santo Financial Group mentor Ricardo Salgado totaling over a million euros over his mandate that he did not disclose in the annual income and assets declarations required of all Portuguese government officials. In the course of subsequent litigation it was further revealed that he had also received an initial tranche of 500 thousand euros just prior to becoming minister. Pinho was originally indicted in 2017 for favoring EDP in exchange for the Columbia University position but the indictment was voided by the presiding judge's decision, which was overturned on appeal and Pinho was subsequently re-indicted in 2019 on more extensive corruption, tax fraud, and money laundering charges for having received a total of 4.5 million euros in illegal payments. Pinho initially refused to reveal what the offshore payments concerned saying only that he "did not receive from the ESFG a single euro that he was not owed." but in his 2023 legal defense argued that the payments had been on account of a pre-determined 2004 executive bonus from the ESFG.

=== Secret payments to Pinho's ministerial advisor and right hand man ===
In 2019 it was further revealed that while Pinho was Minister his closest advisor and right-hand man João Conceição was paid considerably above his position (and more than double Pinho's minister salary) through a no-show job at Banco Comercial Português personally arranged by EDP-Energias de Portugal's António Mexia presumably at Pinho's request and with his knowledge. Both Mexia and João Conceicão have also been indicted for corruption as a result.

=== Pinho's flight risk and arrest ===
After his indictment in 2017, Pinho divested bank accounts and real estate assets in his name in Portugal., including his luxury Lisbon home that he sold in 2018 for 2.8 million euros. He also changed his permanent legal residence from Portugal to Spain [citation with date needed] which prompted Portugal's Public Prosecutor to consider him a flight risk and ask the Court for his preemptive arrest, which was granted on 14 December 2021. After spending the first night in jail, Manuel Pinho was ordered to surrender his passport and was tagged with a GPS ankle-bracelet and placed under house arrest, where, as of May 2025, he awaits trial developments along with his wife Alexandra Pinho who also was charged and convicted for her co-ownership of Manuel Pinho's offshore accounts and complicity in the tax fraud and money laundering

=== The "Odebrecht Prince" investigation and other ongoing investigations ===
During 2020, it also emerged that Portugal's Public Prosecutor further suspected Manuel Pinho of being a socalled "Odebrecht Prince", identified as such in coded talk conversations intercepted by the Brazilian police, who allegedly had received a 4.8 million euros bribe for facilitating the awarding of the Sabor Dam construction contract to the Brazilian Odebrecht consortium. and on 18 January 2021, a Portuguese Court issued a statement naming Manuel Pinho, António Mexia e João Manso Neto as suspects of having been corrupted by Odebrecht in the awarding of the construction works for the Sabor dam. He is also accused of, four months before he left government, having received 58,000 euros from a construction company with headquarters in Gibraltar.

== Academic career (2010 onwards) ==
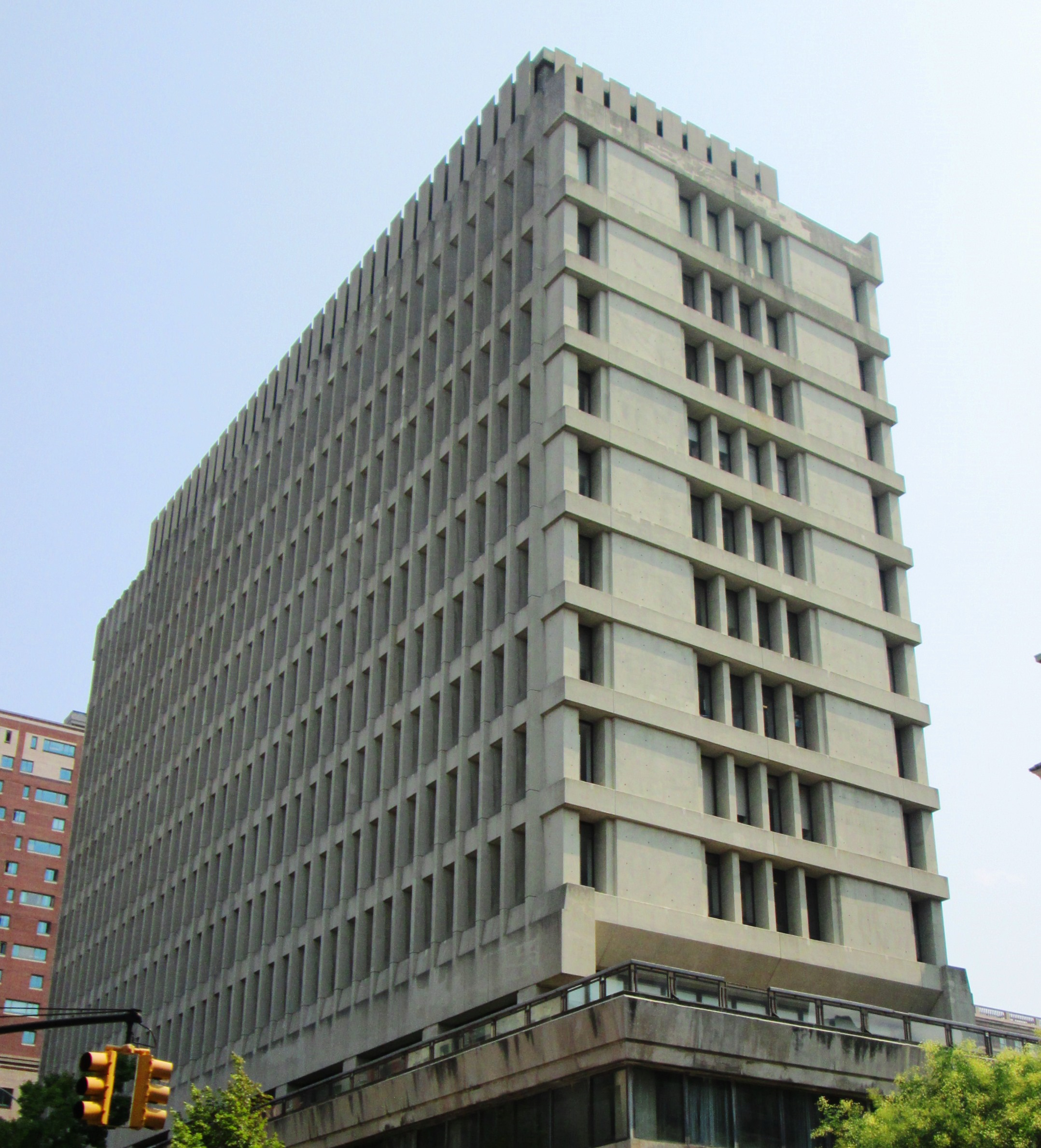
SIPA's office building at Columbia University, where Manuel Pinho was intermittently a visiting professor between 2010 and 2017.

Prior to becoming a banker in the early 1990s, Pinho had taught economics at Lisbon's Economics and Business Management Institute (ISEG) and at the Portuguese Catholic University. He returned to academia in 2010 when the School of International and Public Affairs, Columbia University hired him as an Energy Policy Visiting Professor following a "multi-year gift" from EDP - Energias de Portugal as disclosed by SIPA in its 2010, 2011, and 2012 Annual Reports. Pinho has also been a visiting professor at Georgetown University, a senior fellow of the Jackson Institute, Yale University, director of the Lisbon University Institute's energy MBA, a guest professor at Beijing Foreign Studies University, and at Renmin University of China. According to Pinho's 2017 indictment in Portugal, he also benefited from his association to EDP - Energias de Portugal (through its main shareholder China Three Gorges Corporation) to obtain the positions in the Chinese universities.

=== Controversial hiring of Pinho by Columbia University ===
The coincidence of EDP's decision to sponsor Columbia University and its hiring of Manuel Pinho generated much controversy in the Portuguese press that reported Manuel Pinho had arranged for the gift from EDP in an amount of 3 million euros while he was minister in charge of energy issues and dealt extensively with EDP - Energias de Portugal. According to the press, this raised issues of a major conflict of interest and political graft for Pinho and Mexia and of academic integrity for Columbia University for seemingly granting faculty positions in exchange for cash gifts, as evidenced by an e-mail from the SIPA Dean at the time, John Coatsworth, asking EDP to make a first payment of 300 thousand dollars for a guest professor position, for which "Manuel Pinho was the best positioned candidate." Manuel Pinho and EDP managers repeatedly denied that there had been an arrangement to hire Manuel Pinho, but, in February 2019, more e-mails were revealed that confirmed that Pinho had personally asked Columbia University to hire him in exchange for 1.2 million euros from EDP and that he had pleaded that the arrangement not be revealed publicly.

== Personal life ==
Pinho is the father of three children from his 20-year first marriage to fashion entrepreneur Paula Serra that ended in divorce in the early 2000s. He remarried another divorcee Alexandra Fonseca (who changed her name to Alexandra Pinho) with grown children of her own.

In a 2006 interview about his personal life, Pinho publicly acknowledged that he was an avid collector of photography and revealed that "after he returned from America" in 1988 he had a near death auto accident that has since limited his mobility. Pinho also revealed a passion for dancing when he said that, despite the accident, he "could still dance and loved to do it." In another interview in 2005, he had revealed he was a lifelong supporter of Lisbon-based football team S.L. Benfica.

Following Manuel Pinho's arrest in 2021, his lawyer publicly divulged on TV that Pinho owns an apartment in New York, four apartments in "the north of Portugal", a country farm (location not disclosed), and a house near Braga where Pinho has stayed since mid-2022 under house arrest. He further divulged that Pinho receives a monthly pension of "15,000 euros net" presumably from his time at the ESG. In the 2022 prosecution charges, the monthly pension is valued at 26,000 euros total, all but 2,115 euros of which were impounded by the Court along with other assets in the names of Pinho and his wife.
