= Banco Best =

BEST - Banco Electrónico de Serviço Total, S.A.
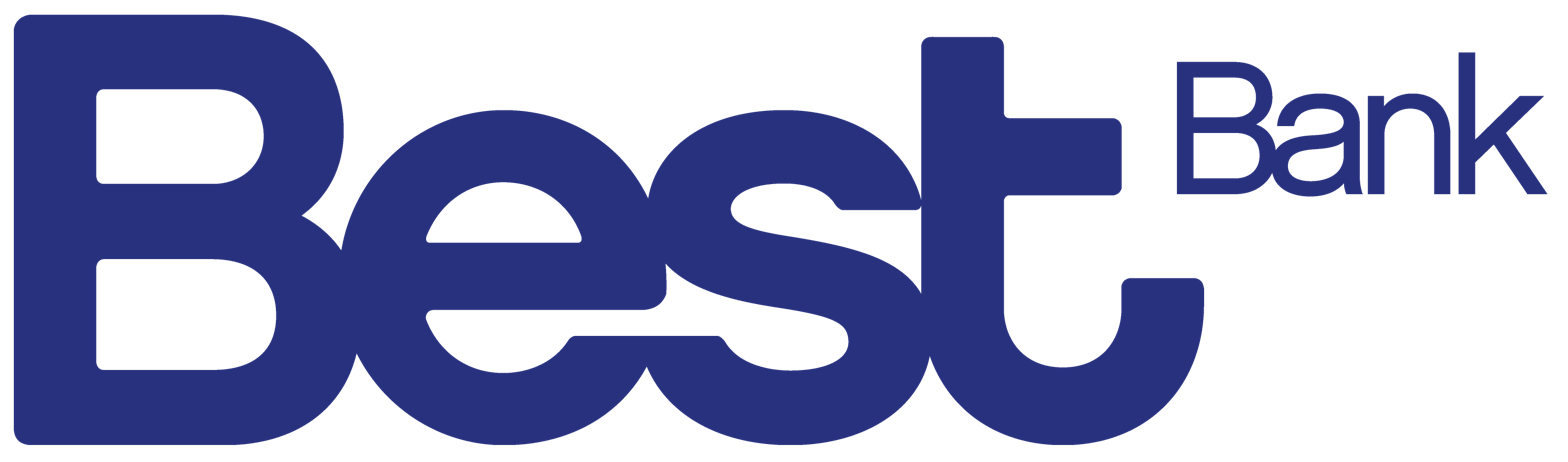
- Trade name: Banco Best; Best Bank
- Company type: Privately held company
- Industry: Banking; Financial services
- Founded: 2001
- Headquarters: Lisbon, Portugal
- Area served: Portugal
- Key people: Nuno Rocha; Pedro das Neves; Marta Mariz
- Products: Checking Accounts; Term Deposits; Investments; Retirement; Cards; Loans; Insurance
- Services: Retail Banking; Commercial Banking; Investment Banking; Private Banking; Wealth Management
- Revenue: ▲€18.3 million (2022)
- Operating income: ▼€1.8 million (2022)
- Net income: ▼€1.7 million (2022)
- Total assets: ▲€878 million (2022)
- Total equity: ▼€78.9 million (2022)
- Owner: Novo Banco (100%)
- Members: 89,000 (2021)
- Number of employees: 87 (2022)
- Capital ratio: ▲50.6% (2022)
- Website: https://www.bancobest.pt/

Banco Best, also known as Best Bank, is a private financial institution founded in 2001 and registered with the Bank of Portugal and the Portuguese Securities Market Commission (CMVM).

Based in Lisbon, Banco Best operates in the areas of Banking, Asset Management, and Trading, providing its services from a multi-channel perspective.

Focused on digital, Banco Best offers a wide range of everyday products and services, such as accounts, credit and debit cards, credit and insurance, as well as a variety of investment products, including funds, ETFs, stocks, and retirement products.

Banco Best products include Conta Digital. MB WAY and access to all the bank's products, such as term deposits.

In addition to its online focus, the digital bank also has 6 Investment Centers (Aveiro, Braga, Faro, Leiria, Lisbon, and Faro) and 7 Offices (Boavista, Guimarães, Monção, Porto - Foz, Santarém, Tâmega e Sousa, and Vila Verde).

Banco Best concluded the 2021 financial year with a positive net result of 3.3 million euros. However, in 2022, despite an increase in revenue, the bank experienced a decrease in net results, which amounted to 1.7 million euros.

== History ==
The bank was founded in June 2001 with a shareholder structure consisting of the defunct Banco Espírito Santo (BES) 75% and Saxo Bank 25%. In 2015, with the departure of Saxo Bank, the bank became wholly owned by Novo Banco (100%).

In March 2023, Novo Banco launched the project to sell Banco Best, which it called "Project Bravo". However, two months after the sale process had been launched, Novo Banco withdrew from the sale of Banco Best due to the group's strategic repositioning in digital.

== See also ==
- List of banks in Portugal
- Bank of Portugal
- Portuguese Securities Market Commission
- Novo Banco
