= Espírito Santo Financial Group =

Portuguese holding company headquartered in Luxembourg

Banco Espirito Santo Financial Group
- Type: Sociedade Anónima
- Industry: Financial services
- Founded: 1984
- Founder: Ricardo Espírito Santo Silva Salgado
- Headquarters: Luxembourg, Luxembourg
- Area served: Europe, United States, Latin America, Africa, Asia, Arabian Peninsula
- Key people: chairman and CEO = Roger H. Hartmann; Ricardo Espírito Santo Silva Salgado, José Manuel Pinheiro Espírito Santo Silva
- Products: Retail, corporate, investment and private banking, insurance, asset management, private equity
- Total assets: $119.1 billion (2015)
- Website: www.esfg.com

The Espírito Santo Financial Group (ESFG) was a Portuguese holding company with headquarters in Luxembourg, founded in 1984. The group represents the interests of the Portuguese Espirito Santo Group, which has major investments in Portugal and Europe, Americas, Africa and Asia.

The company is listed on the NYSE Euronext and the London Stock Exchange. The flagship of ESFG is the Banco Espírito Santo(BES), a full-service bank based in Lisbon. The bank has subsidiaries within and outside of the Portuguese-speaking business world. Through its subsidiaries, ESFG provides a series of banking services that are centered in the Banco Espirito Santo. These are general insurance services (Tranquilidade) and health services (BES Saúde).

In addition to the Banco Espirito Santo in Portugal, Azores and Madeira, BES has branches in Luanda, as well as branches or offices in São Paulo, Praia, Madrid, London, Frankfurt, Paris, Warsaw, Lausanne, Macau, Panama City, Dubai, Miami, New York City, Caracas and the Cayman Islands.

In May 2014, it was disclosed, in a rights issue document of Banco Espírito Santo, the major shareholder(Espirito Santo International) of the group was in “serious financial condition” and accounting “irregularities" were found after an external audit was ordered by the Bank of Portugal. ESFG owned 25% of Banco Espírito Santo and Espírito Santo International owned 49% of ESFG. The Government of Portugal and Portugal's biggest bank, Caixa Geral de Depósitos, refused assistance to the group. Long time CEO, Ricardo Salgado resigned in July 2014, on pressure by the Bank of Portugal.

Prior to its downfall, it came to public attention that the group had several dealings and associations with corruption and tax avoidance cases, such as the bribery case over the acquisition of submarines and the Panama Papers scandal.

The potential of a default of the group's obligations caused great concern among creditors. On 11 July 2014, Banco Espírito Santo, partially owned by ESFG, disclosed that it has a buffer of 2.1 billion euros above the regulatory minimum; enough to cover its exposure to debt in the Espirito Santo Financial Group.

== File for bankruptcy ==
On 18 July 2014 the Espirito Santo family’s holding company, which owns a stake in Portugal’s second-largest bank, has filed for creditor protection, meaning that it is bankrupt.

== Operations ==
Related organizations
Commercial banking

- Banco Espírito Santo
- Banco Espírito Santo Azores
- Banco Espírito Santo Angola (BESA)
- Bank Espírito Santo International in the Cayman Islands
- Banco Espírito Santo Espanha in Spain
- Espírito Santo Bank based in Miami in the United States
- Banque Espírito Santo et de la Venetie in France
- Banco Espírito Santo do Oriente based in Macau
- Banco Espirito Santo Cabo Verde
- ES Bank Panama in Panama
- Banco Espirito Santo Venezuela
- Banco Best (Banco Electrónico de Serviço Total, S.A.)

Financial services

- Compagnie Bancaire Espírito Santo in Switzerland
- ESAF - Espírito Santo Activos Financeiros
- Espírito Santo Activos Financieros Spain

Insurance and Healthcare

In Portugal:

- Companhia de Seguros Tranquilidade "Traquilidade"
- Companhia de Seguros Tranquilidade Vida
- Espirito Santo Companhia de Seguros
- Espírito Santo Saúde (Hospitals)

Investment banking

- Banco Espírito Santo de Investimento
- Banco Internationale de Credito
- BES Investimento do Brasil in Brazil
- Espírito Santo Investment in Spain

Other

In Portugal:

- Besleasing e Factoring
- Crediflash credit cards
- ES Capital venture capital

The bank owns a small part of Banque Marocaine du Commerce Extérieur, a bank in Morocco.

== See also ==
- Banco Espírito Santo Azores
- BESI Brasil
