= Inter-Alpha Group of Banks =

European banking organization

The Inter-Alpha Group of Banks was created in 1971 by six banks in the European Community to provide a platform for the regular exchange of ideas and to explore areas for cooperation between its member banks. The group is a non-hierarchical association and is maintained by mutual agreement with each bank retaining full autonomy and independence.

It was one of the banking clubs set up during the 1960s and 1970s when a number of European banks attempted to cooperate at an international level.

== Function ==
The group's function has evolved to:

- Provide a platform for the regular exchange of ideas at the executive and senior management level
- Allow specialists to meet and discuss topics of particular interest
- Establish areas of cooperation, particularly in international trade
- Train bank management through the annual Inter-Alpha Banking School and annual Inter-Alpha Banking Management Programme at INSEAD at Fontainebleau near Paris
- Create a framework for individual banks within the Group to work together

== Members ==
Membership of the group has grown to eleven banks, representing 15 European countries:

- AIB Group, Ireland
- Banco Espírito Santo (BES), and from 2014, Novo Banco, Portugal
- Commerzbank, Germany
- ING Group, Netherlands
- Intesa Sanpaolo, Italy
- Kredietbank (KB), and from 1998, KBC Bank, Belgium
- Nordea, Norway, Denmark, Finland and Sweden
- National Bank of Greece, Greece
- NatWest Group, UK (via Williams & Glyn's Bank)
- Santander, Spain
- Société Générale, France

== See also ==
- ABECOR
- Financial market
- Financial services
