= Ricardo Espírito Santo =

Portuguese banker, economist (1900 - 1955)

- Born: Ricardo Ribeiro do Espírito Santo e Silva; 12 November 1900; Cascais, Portugal
- Died: 2 November 1955 (aged 54); Cascais
- Occupation: Banker
- Years active: 35
- Known for: President of Banco Espírito Santo, Portugal; Collector of Portuguese art and furniture

Ricardo Ribeiro do Espírito Santo Silva ComC GCC (1900–1955) was a Portuguese banker, economist, patron of the arts, and international athlete. A good friend of the Portuguese dictator, António de Oliveira Salazar, he turned the Banco Espírito Santo (BES) into one of the most important financial institutions in Portugal.

== Early life ==
Ricardo Ribeiro do Espírito Santo e Silva was born in Cascais, Portugal, on 12 November 1900. He was the second son and third child of the wealthy money changer, José Maria do Espírito Santo Silva who, in 1883, had founded Silva, Beirão, Pinto & Cia. Over time this company led to the development of other firms such as Espírito Santo Silva & Cia. which, in 1920, was transformed into Banco Espírito Santo (BES). After schooling in Edinburgh, Ricardo married Mary Pinto de Morais Sarmento Cohen (1903 – 1979), the 16-year-old daughter of a Gibraltarian financial acquaintance and half-niece of the 1st Baron of Sendal. Espírito Santo then studied Economic and Financial Sciences at the Technical University of Lisbon. He also took part in a wide range of sports. In addition to playing tennis and taking part in fencing competitions he became Portuguese golf champion in 1933 and was Captain of the Portuguese golf team. He was President of the aristocratic Sporting Club of Cascais and an internationally known bridge player.

Espírito Santo and Mary Cohen had four daughters. The eldest, Maria, married João Carlos Roma Machado Cardoso Salgado. Their son, Ricardo Salgado, was Chief Executive Officer of BES in 2014 when the bank, facing financial difficulties, was split into two parts; Novo Banco, a retail bank, and another unit, which retained BES' toxic debts. In the same year Ricardo Salgado was arrested and charged with various financial irregularities.

== Banco Espírito Santo ==
Espírito Santo's elder brother José fell in love with Vera, the sister of Mary Cohen, but was persuaded not to marry her on the grounds that two brothers with the same in-laws was not desirable. José married another woman and had three children while Vera also married. However, the love remained and in 1932 José Espírito Santo and Vera “eloped” to Paris overnight. This caused a great scandal in Catholic and conservative Lisbon of the 1930s and the couple was effectively ostracised. Ricardo Espírito Santo took over from José as president of Banco Espírito Santo, a position he held until his death in 1955. José sold all of his shares to Ricardo. Interestingly, when his brother returned to Portugal in 1937, Ricardo returned the shares to him at cost, an act that others in the banking business could not understand. During his time in control of BES, the bank merged with Banco Comercial de Lisboa, changing its name to Banco Espírito Santo e Comercial de Lisboa in 1937. It opened branches throughout the country and became Portugal's leading private bank. The purchase of the Comercial de Lisboa gave BES the capacity to exploit World War II financially through international transactions for products such as tungsten, which was much in demand by the Germans. The name would be changed back to Banco Espírito Santo in 1999. In addition to being a banker, Espírito Santo was also Chairman of the Executive Committee of SACOR, which later became Galp Energia, one of Portugal's largest companies. He was also Director of the Guild of Banks and Banking Houses and was President of the General Assembly of the Society of Economic Sciences in Lisbon.

== Relations with António de Oliveira Salazar ==
During the Second World War, as the most powerful man in the Portuguese economy, he had a mutually beneficial friendship with the Portuguese leader, António Salazar. While the BES benefitted from Espírito Santo's connections with Salazar, the dictator relied on the banker's connections and information sources to give him a better picture of what was happening than he received from his ministers. Later, Salazar would also come to rely on Espírito Santo to finance major investments, such as TAP Air Portugal, and the first bridge over the River Tagus, (first known as the Salazar Bridge and then renamed as the 25 de Abril Bridge after the date of the Carnation Revolution in 1974, when the governing Estado Novo was overthrown). He was also asked to finance Lisbon's Hotel Ritz, as Salazar considered that there was no hotel of sufficient quality for important foreign visitors.

When Salazar decided to buy an official residence in Lisbon in April 1939, Espírito Santo, provided free pieces of his personal property to furnish it. This was done in secret, although it is unlikely that the politician, who paid considerable attention to detail, did not know the origin of the objects. Another example of Salazar's close relationship with the banker concerned Christine Garnier, a French woman with whom Salazar is assumed to have had an affair and who wrote a book about him called Férias com Salazar (Holidays with Salazar). Her transportation, hotels, travel, and gifts were paid by Salazar. The bills were usually settled by Espírito Santo, with Salazar reimbursing him by cheque.

Although friends, Espírito Santo and Salazar disagreed on at least three major issues. After the war, the former successfully insisted on Portugal being part of the Marshall Plan. However, he did not win the argument when Salazar imposed limits on investments abroad. Moreover, he saw few advantages in investing in economic development in Portugal's colonies, although Salazar was keen on maintaining those colonies. Because of the need for capital to be mobilised, Salazar accepted the rise of economic and financial groups such as BES, but he controlled closely any attempt at political intervention.

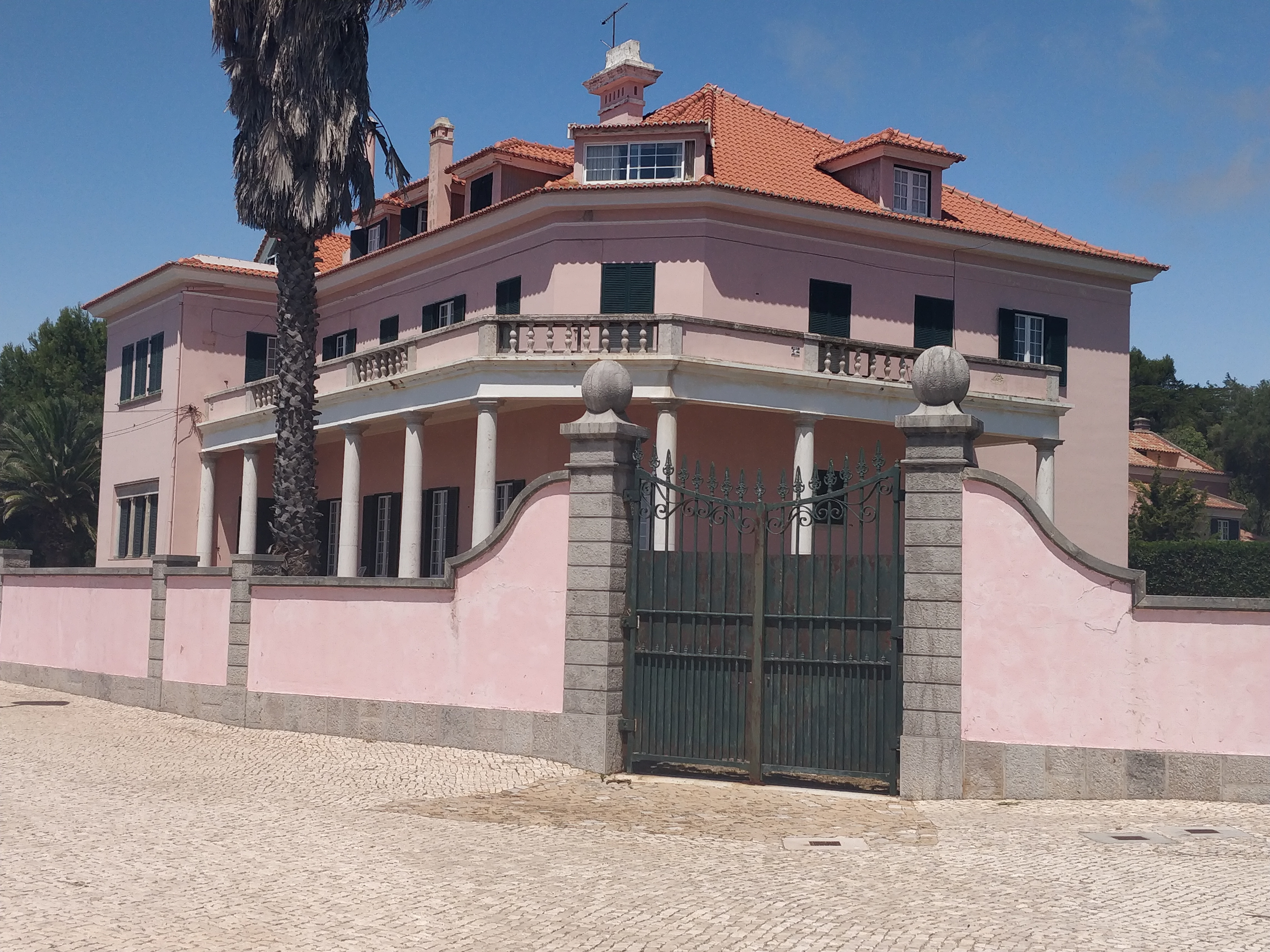
Former home of Ricardo Espírito Santo in Cascais, where the Duke and Duchess of Windsor stayed

== The Duke of Windsor ==
During the Second World War, despite his wife's Jewish ancestry and the considerable support that BES had provided to numerous Jewish refugees that passed through Lisbon, Espírito Santo came to be suspected by the British spy agency MI6 of being sympathetic to the German side. With the German invasion of France, the British Duke of Windsor, the former King Edward VIII who, after his abdication, had been living in Paris with his wife Wallis, the Duchess of Windsor, made his way to Madrid. The couple were planning to move on to Lisbon as a means of reaching London by boat or plane, although it was unclear whether Britain wanted them back. Pursuing Portugal's policy of neutrality, Salazar was concerned not to upset Adolf Hitler, but he also did not want to annoy Winston Churchill. He arranged for the Duke and Duchess to stay with Espírito Santo at his home in Cascais, rather than at a hotel in Lisbon, thus keeping the couple out of view and away from German agents in Lisbon, who were aiming to persuade them to go to Berlin. The Duke and Duchess stayed in Cascais for a month and eventually left by ship on 1 August 1940, after the Duke had been appointed Governor of the Bahamas. During the same period, Espirito Santo helped Maurice de Rothschild and Baron de Rothschild to seek refuge in Portugal, receiving the gratitude of both men.

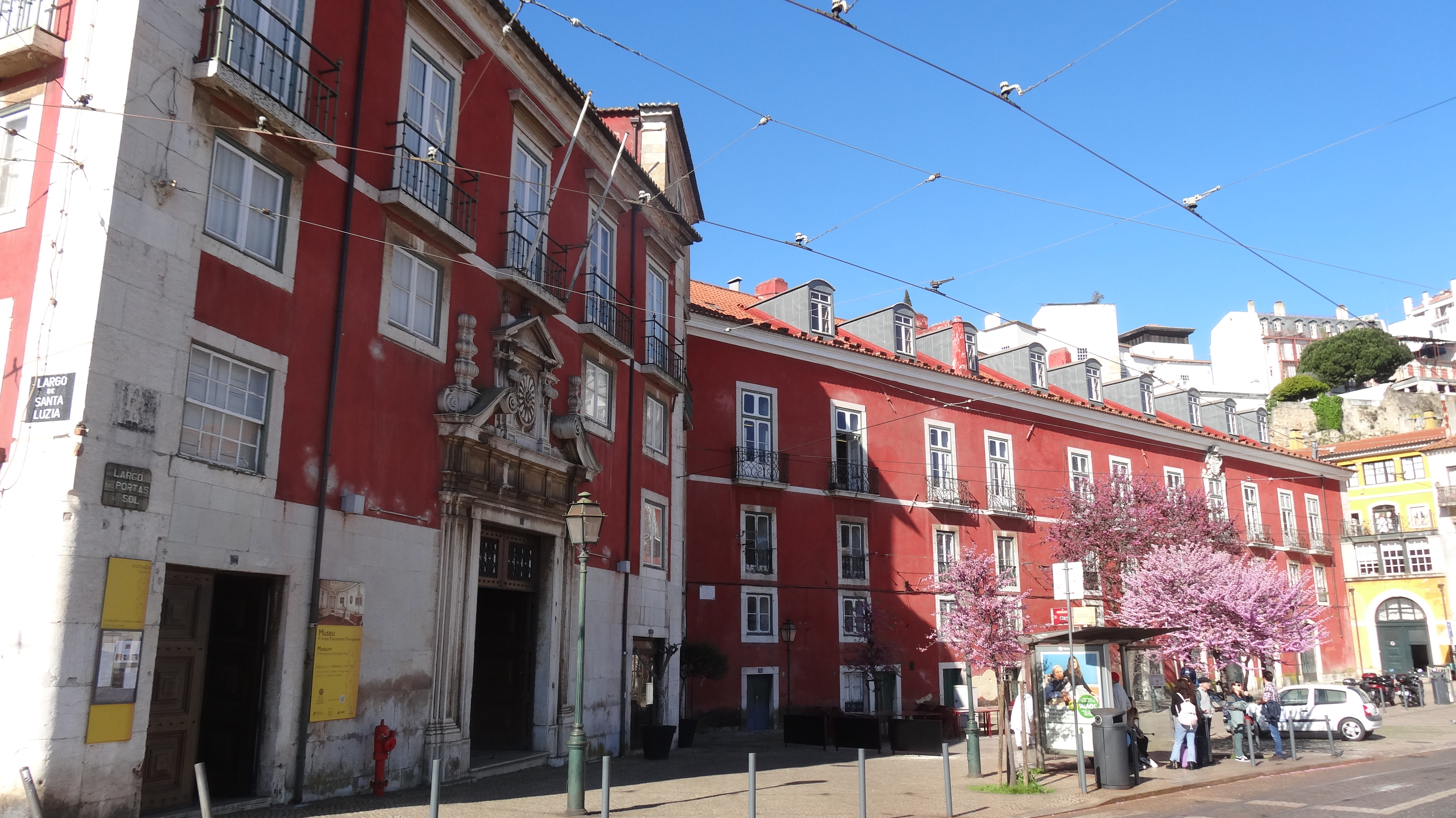
The Ricardo Espírito Santo Foundation in Lisbon

== Art collection ==
Espírito Santo's philanthropic activities included the reconstruction of and ongoing support for an orphanage that had fallen into disrepair. However, his main interest away from work was arts and culture. He developed a large collection of paintings, furniture and tapestries. His interest in collecting has been described as “insatiable”. In 1953, he created the Fundação Ricardo do Espírito Santo (Ricardo do Espírito Santo Foundation), designed to serve as a "School-Museum of Decorative Arts" aimed at improving the skills of art restorers. For this purpose he purchased the abandoned Azurara Palace in Lisbon, which he restored in collaboration with the architect, Raul Lino, to be an 18th-century aristocrat's house, and then donated it to the Portuguese State, together with a collection of pieces of Portuguese art that were lost during the 19th century and rescued by Espírito Santo from all over Europe and the United States. A year later, in 1954, he organized an important exhibition of Portuguese jewellery in Paris, which would be presented after his death. In addition to articles on economics and banking, he published numerous pieces on art. As a passionate collector and specialist in the History of Art, he sponsored the publication of several works, including the Dictionary of Portuguese Painters and Sculptors (Dicionário de Pintores e Escultores Portugueses) by Fernando de Pamplona, in five volumes; Masterpieces of Flemish Painting in Portugal, (Obras-Primas da Pintura Flamenga dos Séculos XV e XVI em Portugal) by Luís Reis Santos, and the reissue of Cerâmica Portuguesa (Portuguese Ceramics), by José Queirós. In collaboration with J. Lloyd Hyde, and with original illustrations by Eduardo Malta, he prepared the work Chinese Porcelain for the European Market, which was only published in 1956, the year following his death.

== Death ==
Ricardo Espírito Santo died in Cascais on 2 November 1955 as a result of a heart attack he suffered in the post-operative period of an operation on his stomach. During his life he had received numerous awards and in 2003 he was featured on a Portuguese postage stamp.

== Honours ==
Country	Rank	Honour	Ribbon
Portugal	Grand Cross	Order of Christ	
Portugal	Commander	Order of Christ	
Portugal	Commander	Order of Merit	
Holy See	Knight Commander	Pontifical Equestrian Order of St. Gregory the Great	
Romania	Commander	Order of the Star of Romania	
France	Officer	Legion of Honour	
