= Vítor Bento =

Portuguese businessman (born 1954)

Vítor Augusto Brinquete Bento (Estremoz, June 25, 1954) is a Portuguese banker. He was the CEO of the Portuguese bank Novo Banco since August 4, 2014 until September 13, 2014, when he announced his resignation. He was replaced by Eduardo Stock da Cunha.

== Education ==
Vítor Bento has a degree in economics from the School of Economic and Financial Sciences of the Technical University of Lisbon and a Master's in Philosophy from the Faculty of Arts and Humanities of the Catholic University of Portugal.

== Professional activity ==
In 1980, Vítor Bento was admitted at Banco de Portugal as an economist for the Department of Economic Studies. In 1985 he was named Director of the Foreign Department and later executive director of the Issuing Institute of Macao (current Monetary Authority of Macao), returning to the Portuguese central bank in 1989 as deputy director of the Foreign Department, becoming its Director in 1993.

From 1989 to 1994 he was a member of the Exchanges Policy Subcommittee of the Central Banks Governor Committee from the European Community. In 1994, he joined the Ministry of Finance, where he was General Director of Treasury, President of Junta de Crédito Público and member of the European Monetary Committee.

In 1996 he founded Agência de Gestão da Tesouraria e da Dívida Pública (IGCP), the public entity responsible for the integrated management of cash, funding and the direct debt management, thus becoming its first President. In 2000 he takes on the position of President of the Board at SIBS – Sociedade Interbancária de Serviços SA, where he stays until July 2014, when he joins the Board of the Portuguese bank Banco Espírito Santo.

During this time he was also president of UNICRE, director of Visa, president of SEDES – Association for the Economic and Social Development – from May 2006 to April 2008 and non-executive director of Galp Energia from April 2012 to July 2014. In December 2009 he was nominated member of the State Council by the President of the Portuguese Republic, Cavaco Silva, position from which he left in July 2014.

Vítor Bento is visiting professor at the Faculty of Economics and Business of the Catholic University of Portugal and at the School of Business of Economics at Nova.

== Awards and nominations ==
On June 28, 2005, Vítor Bento was made Grande-Oficial da Ordem do Infante D. Henrique.

== Publications ==
Vítor Bento has published five books:

- Os Estados Nacionais e a Economia Global (2004), Almedina
- Perceber a Crise para Encontrar o Caminho (2009), Bnomics
- O Nó Cego da Economia (2010), Bnomics
- Economia, Moral e Política (2011), Fundação Francisco Manuel dos Santos
- Euro forte, Euro fraco - Duas culturas, uma moeda. Um convívio (im)possível? (2013), Bnomics
