= Cardmobili =

Europe-based mobile application development

Coordinates: 41.215°N 8.622778°W

CardMobili
- Type: Private
- Industry: Cloud-based payment, coupon and loyalty program management (via mobile phone)
- Founded: 2009
- Products: Digital credit card, Mobile phone applications
- Number of employees: 12
- Website: cardmobili.com

CardMobili is a European-based mobile application development company founded in 2009. The primary application of the company, also named CardMobili, provided a platform for managing customer loyalty programs via mobile phones. The application provided for digitizing and storing loyalty and membership cards, allowing their barcodes to be scanned directly from the device screen. It supported Android, iPhone, BlackBerry, Windows Phone 7, Windows Mobile, Nokia, Vodafone, and other brands. CardMobili and the Portuguese Bank Banco Espírito Santo collaborated to launch the world's first digital credit card.

On April 30, 2016, the application was removed from app stores and online features ceased functioning.

== Awards and reception ==
In 2010, Cardmobili won Vodafone's "Mobile Clicks" contest for the best mobile internet startup.
