= ABECOR =

Association of banks located in Brussels

The Associated Banks of Europe Corporation (or ABECOR) was founded in 1972 in Brussels by ABN AMRO and three other banks to enhance the Bank's operations in Europe. The association later consisted of the nine banks:

- Banque Nationale de Paris
- Barclays Bank
- Banca Nazionale del Lavoro
- Dresdner Bank
- Algemene Bank Nederland
- Bayerische Hypotheken- und Wechsel-Bank
- Banque de Bruxelles
- Banque Internationale à Luxembourg
- Österreichische Länderbank

With over $200 Billion in assets, it was supposed to be a major group or banking club in Europe, its main legacy was a joint training centre.

The association generally did not live up to the expectations of its member banks, with the exception of the economists, who regularly and intensively exchanged thoughts and were able to tap into sizeable databases and analysis. The banks found that when attempting joint projects the majority were often held back by a stubborn minority.

One enduring accomplishment however of the ABECOR cooperation turned out to be ABIN, the joint training centre in Bad Homburg, Germany, where specialist seminars involving the members’ junior executives were offered.

== See also ==
- Inter-Alpha Group of Banks
