= Banco Económico (Angola) =

Bank of Angola

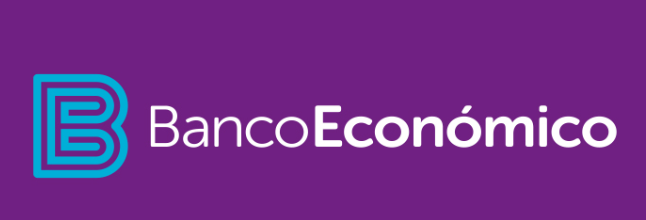
- Company type: Logo Banco Economico
- Industry: Finance
- Headquarters: Luanda, Angola
- Products: Financial services
- Website: bancoeconomico.ao

Banco Económico, formerly Banco Espírito Santo Angola (BESA) renamed in 2015, after the bankruptcy of its mother house in Portugal, Banco Espírito Santo (BES), is an Angolan bank based in Luanda. Previously, BESA was affiliated with the now defunct Banco Espírito Santo, now Novo Banco, and is therefore a subsidiary of Espírito Santo Financial Group (ESFG).

On 28 July 2014 it was announced that the Angolan state takes over the majority of Banco Espirito Angola, as its Angolan partners inject fresh capital of about US$3 billion into the Angolan bank.

At the end of 2014, the largest shareholders were Sonangol, with about 35%; Novo Banco, with a 9.9% stake; Portmill's Angolan company, with 24%, and Geni group (controlled by Leopoldino Fragoso do Nascimento), with 18.99% of the capital, in addition to Lektron Capital (a private limited company linked with Manuel Vicente) with 30.98%.

On October 30, 2014, it was informed by the National Bank of Angola that BESA would assume the name of Banco Económico SA.

== See also ==
- List of banks in Angola
