= Portuguese Securities Market Commission =

Portuguese financial regulator

- Comissão do Mercado de Valores Mobiliários
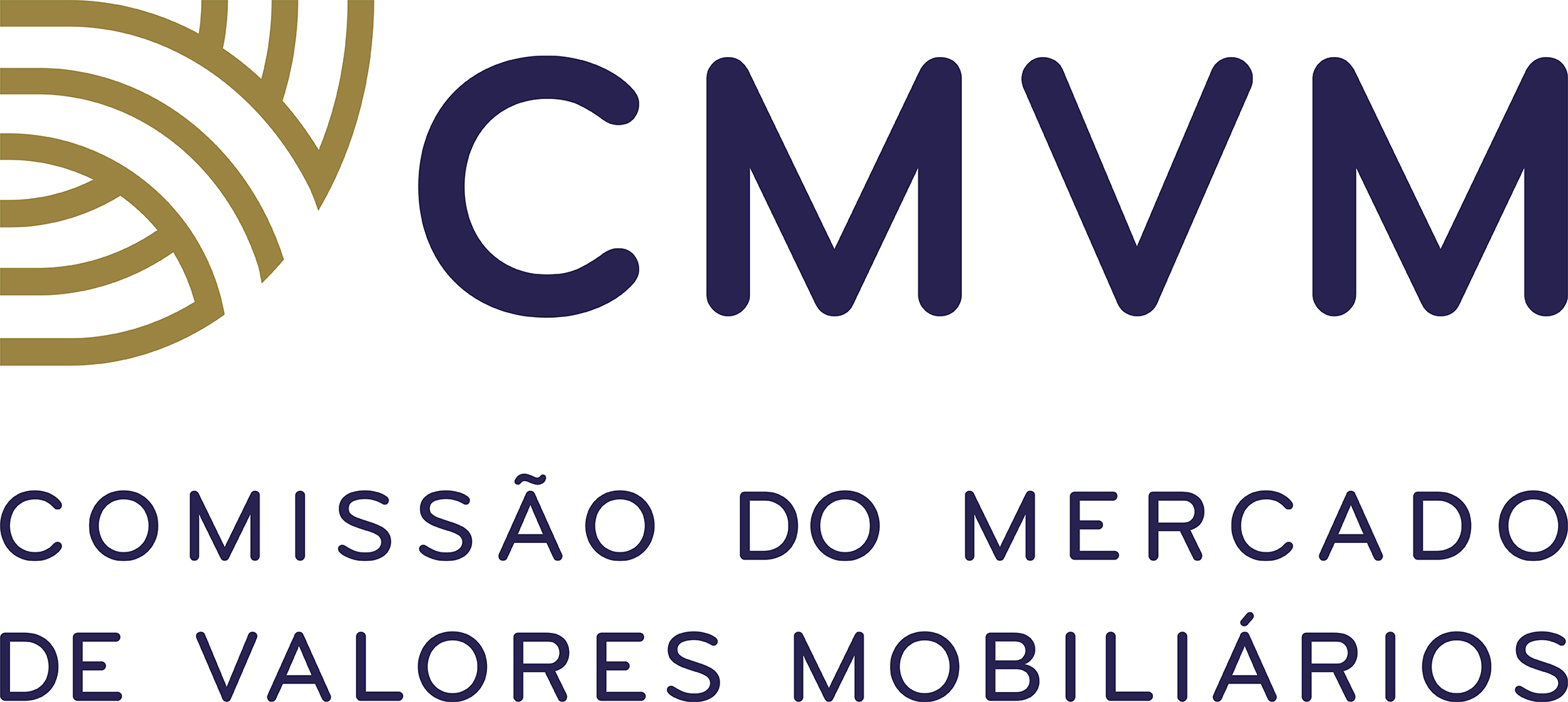

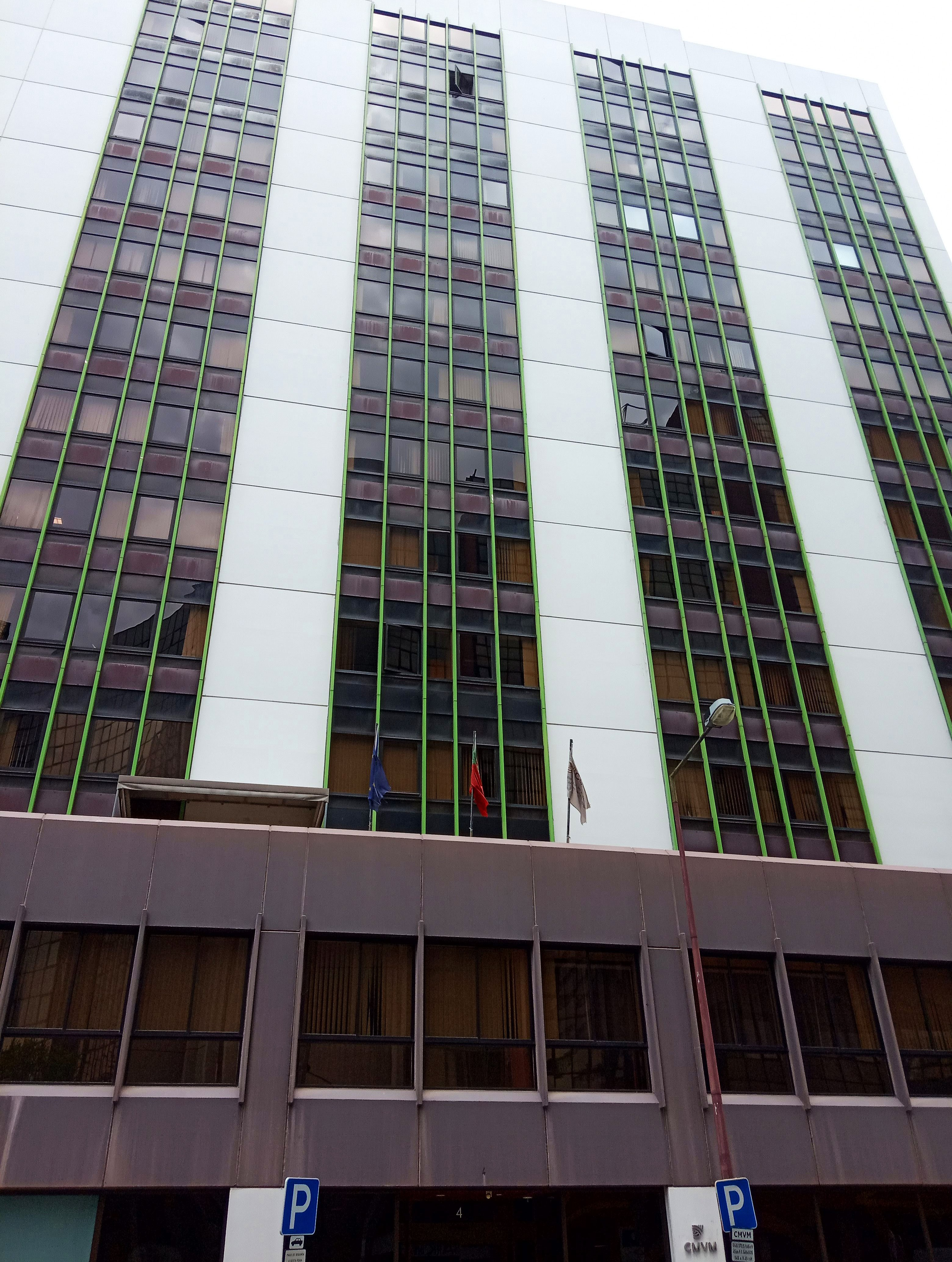

Agency overview
- Formed: May 10, 1991; 34 years ago
- Type: Legal entity governed by public law
- Jurisdiction: Portugal
- Headquarters: Rua Laura Alves 4, Lisbon, Portugal; 38°44′30.5484″N 9°8′59.3484″W
- Agency executive: Gabriel Bernardino, Chair of the Management Board
- Key document: Decree-Law No. 142-A/91, of 10 April (inception of CMVM in portuguese)
- Website: www.cmvm.pt

The Portuguese Securities Market Commission (CMVM) is the Portuguese financial regulator that supervises and regulates securities and other financial instruments and activities of all those who operate within said markets.

The CMVM is an independent public agency endowed with administrative and financial autonomy. It derives its income from supervision fees charged for services and not the General State Budget.

Whereas it is governed under a national framework of accountability, the CMVM increasingly implements policies set at the European Union level. It is a voting member of the Board of Supervisors of the European Securities and Markets Authority (ESMA). It is also a member of the European Systemic Risk Board (ESRB).

== History ==
CMVM was incepted via Decree-Law No. 142-A/91, of 10 April, and established on 10 May 1991 following 30 days after its publication.

== Mission ==
It is CMVM's mission to:

- Sanction infractions to the Securities Code and other national legislation;
- Ensure the stability of the financial markets, by contributing to identify and prevent systemic risk;
- Contribute to the development of financial instruments markets;
- Provide information and handle complaints of non-qualified investors;
- Mediate conflicts between entities that are subject to its supervision and between said and individual investors;
- Assist the Government and the Finance Minister;
- Perform any other tasks that may be assigned by law.

== Structure ==
CMVM structure:

- Management Board
- Supervisory Board;
- Advisory Board;
- Ethics Committee

The CMVM integrates the National Council of Financial Supervisors.

== See also ==
- List of financial supervisory authorities by country
