= Banco Espírito Santo =

Portuguese bank

Banco Espírito Santo S.A.

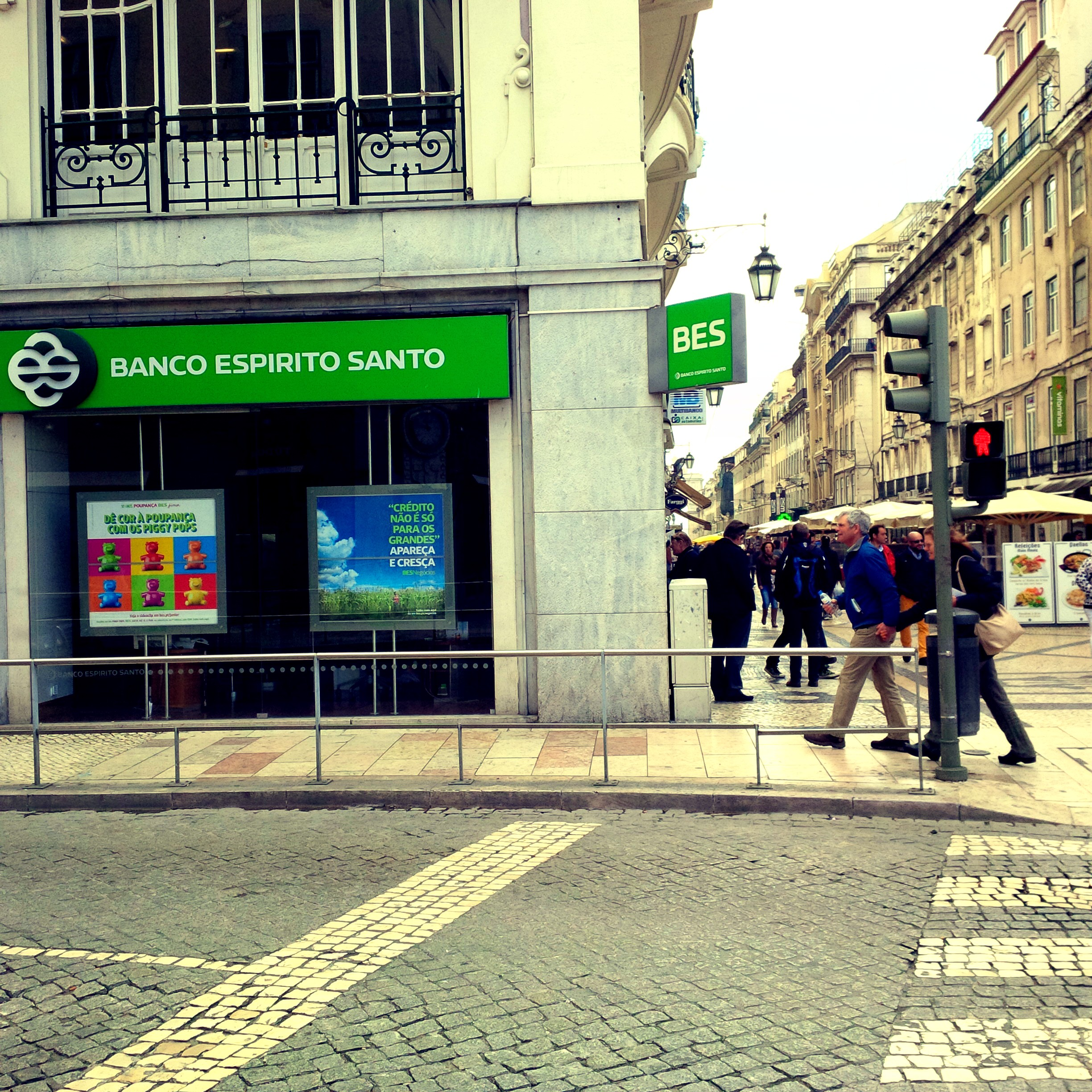
- Branch in Lisbon
- Company type: Sociedade Anónima
- Industry: Financial services
- Founded: 1869
- Defunct: 13 July 2016 (entered into liquidation)
- Successor: Novo Banco
- Headquarters: Lisbon, Portugal
- Key people: Ricardo Salgado (CEO), Alberto Oliveira Pinto (Chairman)
- Products: Retail and investment banking, insurance, asset management, venture capital
- Revenue: €2.320 billion (2010)
- Net income: €510.5 million (2010)
- Total assets: €83.66 billion (end 2010)
- Total equity: €7.476 billion (end 2010)
- Number of employees: 9,860 (end 2010)
- Subsidiaries: Banco Espírito Santo Angola (76%)
- Website: Banco Espírito Santo - Into Liquidation

Banco Espírito Santo (Portuguese pronunciation: [ˈbɐ̃ku (i)ʃˈpiɾitu ˈsɐ̃tu], BES) was a Portuguese bank based in Lisbon that on 3 August 2014 was split in two banks: Novo Banco, which kept its healthy operations, and a "bad bank" to keep its toxic assets.

It once was the second-largest listed Portuguese bank and the ninth-largest contributor to the PSI-20 index. BES was the second-largest private financial institution in Portugal in terms of net assets (€80,700 million in March 2011), with an average market share of 20.3% in Portugal and 2.1 million clients.

On 3 August 2014, Banco de Portugal, Portugal's central bank, intervened in the bank by applying a resolution measure that split the bank in two. The bank was split into a healthy bank ("good bank"), Novo Banco, while the toxic assets remained in the existing bank ("bad bank") which entered into liquidation in 13 July 2016. Novo Banco received a €4.9 billion bailout to be recapitalized. The bailout was funded by the Portuguese Resolution Fund (Portuguese: Fundo de Resolução), to which the Portuguese government lent €3.9 billion. The Resolution Fund became the sole owner of Novo Bank.

It has since been proven that the administration of BES led by Ricardo Salgado "disobeyed the Bank of Portugal 21 times, between December 2013 and July 2014", practising "wilful acts of ruinous management".

== History ==
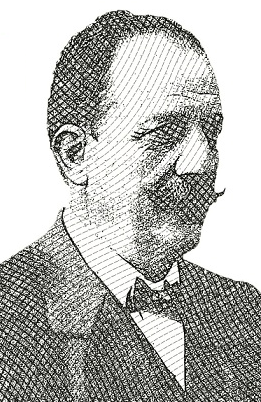
José Maria do Espírito Santo e Silva (1850–1915)

Branch of Banco Espírito Santo in Braga, Portugal.

Banco Espírito Santo's origins began with the lottery, currency exchange, and securities business carried out by José Maria do Espírito Santo e Silva between 1869 and 1884. The first references to trading that the “patriarch of the only dynasty of Portuguese bankers” was undertaking was in the purchase and sale of lotteries, along with national and international transactions in loan securities, on his own account. This took place in his Casa de Cambio, situated in centre of Lisbon and which dated back to the second half of the 19th century (1869). Since then and until 1920, he founded a number of banking institutions, such as Beirão, Silva Pinto & Cª., (1884–1887), Silva, Beirão, Pinto & Cª. (1897–1911), J. M. Espírito Santo Silva (1911–1915), and J. M. Espírito Santo Silva & Cª. (1915).

In 1915, after the death of José Maria do Espírito Santo e Silva, these firms were dissolved and his heirs founded the Casa Bancária Espírito Santo Silva & Cª, which was transformed into a public limited-liability company in 1920 under the name Banco Espírito Santo with the bank, in this decade, managing to consolidate its position within the context of national banking by opening agencies and using a renewed management model.

During Ricardo Ribeiro do Espírito Santo Silva's time in control of BES, the bank merged with Banco Comercial de Lisboa, changing its name to Banco Espírito Santo e Comercial de Lisboa in 1937. It opened branches throughout the country and became Portugal's leading private bank. The purchase of the Comercial de Lisboa gave BES the capacity to exploit World War II financially through international transactions for products such as tungsten, which was much in demand by the Germans.

In 1937, the bank strengthened its position in commercial banking through a merger with Banco Comercial de Lisboa to form Banco Espírito Santo e Comercial de Lisboa (BESCL), which again changed its name to BES in 1999.

Up to the mid-1970s, BESCL reinforced its international presence with acquisitions, partnerships, and the creation of banks in countries such as the United States, Angola, and the United Kingdom, among others. Under a Decree Law of 1975, the bank was nationalised and the Espírito Santo family was prevented from doing business in Portugal. Within this context, the family re-established its financial interests abroad in countries such as Brazil, Switzerland, France, and the United States, culminating in 1975 with the creation of a holding company based in Luxembourg. This company was the predecessor of the Espírito Santo Financial Group (ESFG).

The return to Portugal began in 1986 in partnership with Crédit Agricole and with the support of a core group of Portuguese shareholders. They formed the Banco Internacional de Crédito (BIC), also forming Espírito Santo Sociedade de Investimentos (ESSI), together with Swiss bank UBS and KBC Bank of Luxembourg.

In 1990, the Espírito Santo Group recovered Companhia de Seguros Tranquilidade — the Espirito Santo family held a stake since 1935 — and the control of Banco Espírito Santo in 1991 with the creation of a holding company between ESFG and Crédit Agricole, called BESPAR.

In 1992, BES began operating in the Spanish market where it created Banco Espírito Santo S.A. and in 1995, to open Banco Espírito Santo do Oriente (BESOR) that offers corporate and investment solutions to private clients. Also, in 2001, Banco Espírito Santo Angola, a bank formed under Angolan law, was founded.

In the first six months of 2014 the bank lost the equivalent of $4.8 billion raising concerns about the health of the bank. BES shares fell by 89 per cent. On 3 August 2014, Portugal's central bank announced BES would be restructured by splitting the bank in two. This announcement, following BES record Q2 loss of €3.49 billion, allowed Portuguese stocks to outperform the broader European market the next day.

== Former structure ==
BES has had a stable shareholder structure since 1991. The main shareholders, ESFG and Crédit Agricole, hold 50.8% of the capital. The Group's presence today is felt in 23 countries on four continents through branches, offices of representation, or sub-companies, making the Banco Espírito Santo Group the most international of the Portuguese financial groups. Since 2007, BES has been the only Portuguese bank to be included on the sustainability index FTSE4Good Index reinforcing its positioning as a socially responsible institution. On 3 January 2011, BES was nominated "Best Trade Financial Bank" in Portugal for the fifth consecutive year by Global Finance magazine.

== See also ==
- Cardmobili
- Espírito Santo Financial Group
- Inter-Alpha Group of Banks
