= Ricardo Salgado =

Portuguese economist and banker (born 1944)

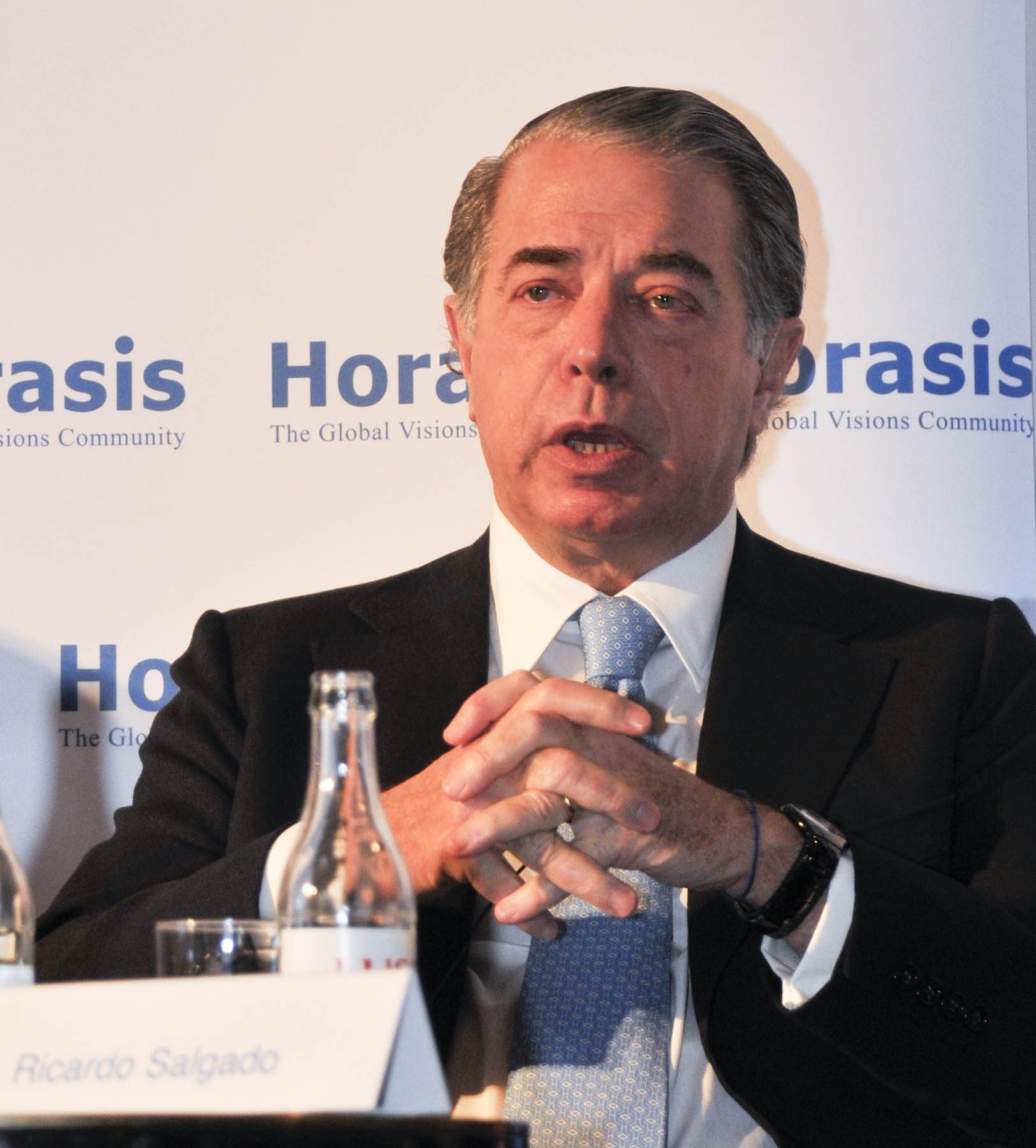
Ricardo Salgado in 2009

Ricardo Espírito Santo Silva Salgado (born June 25, 1944) is a Portuguese economist, banker, and convicted criminal. The former president of Banco Espírito Santo, founded by his grandfather, he was, until July 2014, one of the longest-serving banking executives in Portugal at the time of his arrest.

Salgado was detained on 24 July 2014 in an investigation into suspected tax evasion and money laundering. He was later released on bail of €3m after being questioned by a magistrate at Lisbon's central court of criminal investigation.

== Education ==
Ricardo Salgado was born in Cascais. The great-grandson of José Maria Espírito Santo Silva and maternal grandson of Ricardo Espírito Santo Silva Ribeiro, Salgado spent the first years of his life in Lisbon. He lived in Lapa, where he studied at a public elementary school and later at Liceu Pedro Nunes.

He has a degree in economics from the Higher Institute of Economic and Financial Sciences of the Universidade Técnica de Lisboa (1969), and did his military service in the Portuguese Navy, on the Officer Training Course of the Naval Reserve.

== Career ==
Ricardo Salgado joined the Banco Espírito Santo e Comercial de Lisboa where, in 1972, he headed up the Economic Studies Bureau and subsequently the Credit Board, where he remained until 1975, when the bank was nationalised. From abroad he participated in reconstructing the Espírito Santo Group, first from Brazil (1976–1982) and later from Switzerland (1982–1991). In 1991, after the reprivatisation, he became Executive Chairman of the Banco Espírito Santo (BES) and started on a journey that, among many other aspects, led to an increase in market share from 8% to 20% and to its internationalization (BES was present in 23 countries, on 4 continents, at a time).

In 2002, he was appointed to the supervisory board of the Euronext NV (Amsterdam) and in 2006 he took part in the merger of Euronext with the New York Stock Exchange (NYSE), as a non-executive member of the Board until 2011. He was non-executive Director of Banco Bradesco (Brazil) from 2003 to 2012.

He was a Member of the Senior Board of the Espírito Santo Group, Deputy Chairman of the board of directors and Executive Chairman of the Banco Espírito Santo, chairman of the Board of Directors of the Espírito Santo Financial Group, SA – Luxembourg, chairman of the Board of Directors of Banco Espírito Santo de Investimento, Member of the Board of Directors of Banque Privée Espírito Santo SA – Lausanne and Member of the Board of Directors of Banque Espírito Santo et de la Vénétie – Paris.

Ricardo Salgado was the mentor of BES internationalization, focusing on the strategic triangle Africa, Brazil and Spain. BES international business grew to such an extent that it represented half of the bank's profits. In 2012 the bank led by Ricardo Salgado was the only one of the three largest private Portuguese banks (BES, BCP and BPI) to raise capital using only the shareholders and stock market, without recourse to taxpayers' money. In January 2013 BES was the only Portuguese bank to manage the operation that marks the return of Portugal to the markets, since the country has been subject to the European troika's intervention.

In May 2014, the Bank of Portugal issued a scathing audit which questioned the financial stability and transparency of BES. In the wake of this report, and subsequent downgrades of the bank's credit, Ricardo Salgado announced his resignation from the post of CEO.

Ricardo Salgado was detained on 24 July 2014 in an investigation into suspected tax evasion and money laundering in which Salgado, was later released on bail of €3m after being questioned by an investigating magistrate at Lisbon's central court of criminal investigation. The Prosecutor stated to the media that, “after the court hearing the accused was subject to coercive measures to deposit the amount of €3 million, is not allowed to leave the national territory and is prohibited from contacting certain people. Under discussion is the possible practice of fraud, breach of trust, forgery and money laundering."

In 2015, an audit by Deloitte for the Bank of Portugal concluded that the administration of BES led by Ricardo Salgado "disobeyed the Bank of Portugal 21 times, between December 2013 and July 2014", practising "wilful acts of ruinous management".

== Awards ==
He was voted Economist of the Year in 1992 by the Portuguese Association of Economists and voted Personality of the Year by the Portuguese Chamber of Commerce of Brazil in 2001. In 1994 he was decorated, Chevalier de L’Ordre National du Mérite, French Republic, in 1998, Grande Oficial da Ordem Nacional do Cruzeiro do Sul, by the President of the Federal Republic of Brazil, in 2005, Chevalier de la Légion D´Honneur, French Republic and more recently, in 2012, he was decorated with the Commander's Cross Order of Merit of the Republic of Hungary. He was honored in the category Lifetime achievement in Financial Markets in Investor Relations and Governance Awards in 2012, an initiative of the consultant Deloitte that distinguishes best practices in the business sector. In July 2013, Ricardo Espírito Santo Silva Salgado was awarded a doctorate honoris causa by the Universidade Técnica de Lisboa for his services to the economy, culture, science and to the university.

== Money-laundering charges ==
Financial Times, 25 July 2014: "For the first time in its history, Banco Espírito Santo, one of Portugal’s largest banks, has been placed under independent management with no connection to the banking dynasty that gives the lender its name. The family business empire is in turmoil after its three main companies filed for court protection from creditors. Salgado, who was detained and questioned on Thursday, has been made a formal suspect in a money-laundering investigation. The epitome of Portuguese banking’s fondness for sober suits and wood-panelled boardrooms, Salgado has maintained his traditional gravitas through months of intense crisis for the family group. His serious image matches the power and influence that many believe Portugal’s best-known banker has wielded for 15 years or more. The media has dubbed him “DDT”, the initials for “Dono Disto Tudo”, or “Owner of All This”, a nickname said to have originated in the Espírito Santo family itself. Salgado was born in 1944 into what was already a wealthy banking dynasty, one of a handful of powerful families that António de Oliveira Salazar, the rightwing dictator, allowed to dominate the Portuguese economy. The Espírito Santos mingled with the Rockefellers and befriended the Duke and Duchess of Windsor. But the family's social origins were more humble, some suggesting that their name – which translates as Holy Spirit – originates from a surname traditionally given to babies left at churches by destitute mothers.

As a 30-year-old junior director, Salgado escaped being imprisoned with several senior family members, who were held for months after the 1974 coup that overthrew the dictatorship. In 1975, the banking sector was nationalised and the Espírito Santos dispersed abroad, Salgado living in Brazil and Switzerland. By 1991, he had established himself as the head of the family, leading its return to Portugal and the reacquisition of its bank through a reprivatisation programme. Although wealthy, Salgado is not known for an ostentatious lifestyle, telling a Portuguese newspaper in May 2014 that “my life begins at 8.30 am in the bank and ends at 10 pm in the bank”.

Salgado's influence rapidly waned. According to annual rankings drawn up by the Jornal de Negócios newspaper, Salgado was the third most powerful person in the Portuguese economy in 2013; in 2014 he was in the 48th position.

== Corruption charges ==
Ricardo Salgado is accused in the Operation Marquis case.

Ricardo Salgado is accused in the White Mountain case.

On 7 March 2022, Ricardo Salgado was sentenced to 6 years imprisonment following proven corruption charges (Operation Marquis case). Both Salgado and the Public Prosecutors appealed the decision to the Lisbon Court of Appeal, which on 24 May 2023 decided to increase his prison sentence to 8 years. After this, Salgado appealed to the Supreme Court of Justice.

On 6 June 2024, Ricardo Salgado was sentenced to 6 years in effective prison.
