= Novo Banco =

Portuguese financial bank

Coordinates: 38.7219°N 9.1478°W

NOVO BANCO, SA

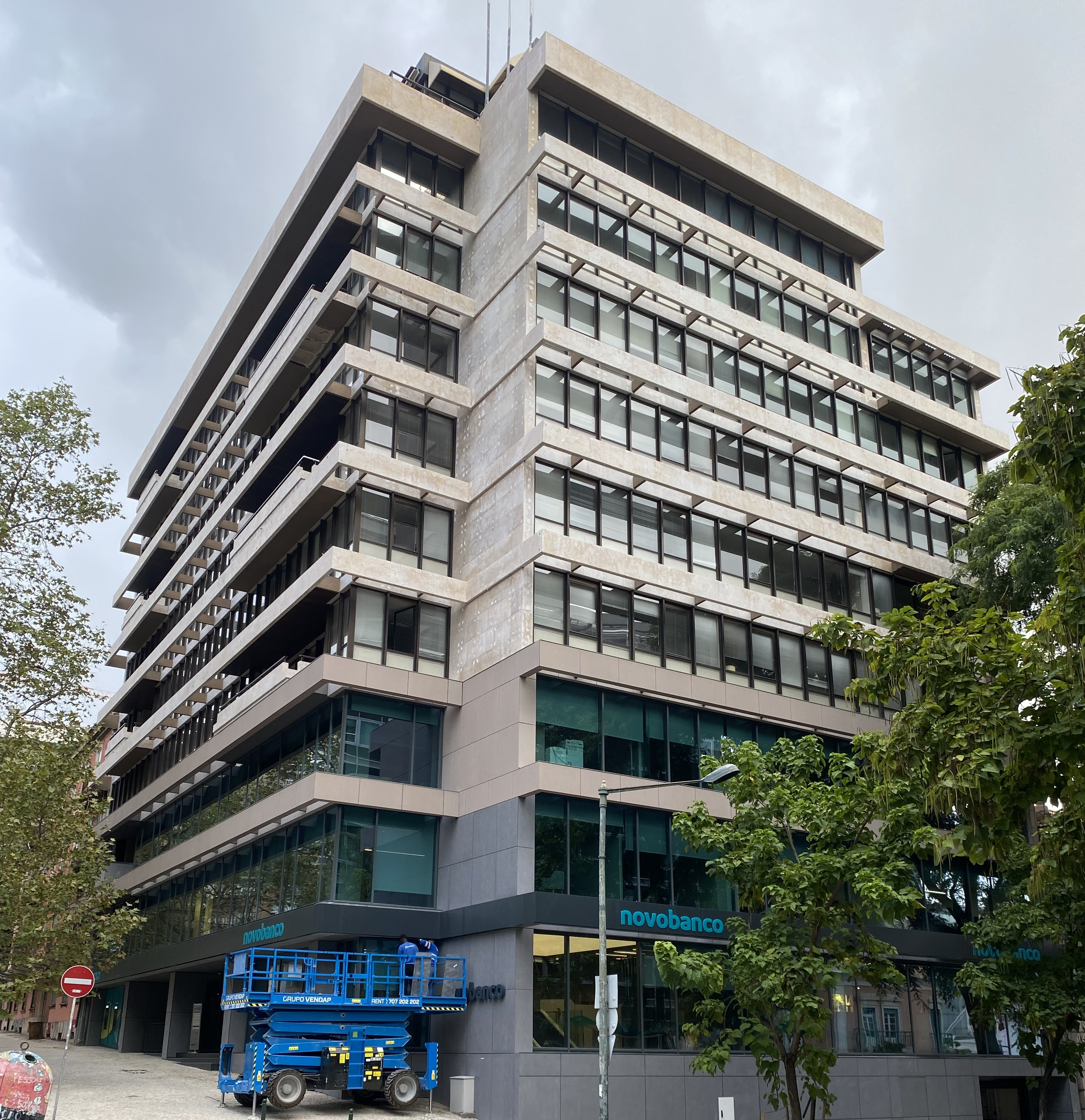
- Company office, Lisbon
- Type: Subsidiary (Sociedade Anónima)
- Industry: Financial services
- Predecessor: Banco Espírito Santo
- Founded: August 4, 2014; 12 years ago
- Headquarters: Oeiras, Portugal
- Number of locations: 289 branches
- Key people: Mark Bourke (CEO); Benjamin Dickgiesser (CFO); Byron Haynes (Chairman)
- Products: Retail and corporate banking, asset management
- Brands: novobanco
- Net income: ▲€828 million (2025)
- Total assets: ▼€46.4 billion (2025)
- Total equity: ▲€4.681 million (2025)
- Owners: BPCE (100%)
- Number of employees: 4,081 (Dec 2025)
- Subsidiaries: Banco Best (100%); GNB GA (100%)
- Website: www.novobanco.com/en/home.html

Novo Banco, SA, (Note: SA stands for Sociedade Anónima.) trading as novobanco (Portuguese pronunciation: [ˈnovubɐ̃ku], lit. 'New Bank'), is a major Portuguese financial bank headquartered in Oeiras. Following the entry into force of European Banking Supervision in late 2014, novobanco has been designated as a Significant Institution and is supervised by the European Central Bank.

Novobanco was established on 4 August 2014, as a result of a restructuring following the bankruptcy of Banco Espírito Santo (BES) led by the Bank of Portugal to hold the bank's healthy assets. This allowed novobanco to operate, split off from the BES's toxic assets after historic losses of 3,577 million euros. BES's toxic assets, on the other hand, were transferred to a "bad bank".

== History ==
The rescue of Banco Espirito Santo came after weeks of increasingly bad news about the financial state of the lender, particularly its exposure to a cascade of companies headed by its founding Espirito Santo family headed by Ricardo Salgado. BES was to be split into a "good bank", renamed Novo Banco, and a "bad bank", which was to house BES's exposures to the troubled Espirito Santo business empire as well as its Angolan subsidiary BESA. Novo Banco was recapitalized to the tune of 4.9 billion euros by a special Resolution Fund financed by the country's banks. The Portuguese state lends the fund 4.4 billion euros.

The bank had a board for the 2014-2017 mandate presided by Vítor Bento. A month and a half after he started up his duties, Bento abandoned the leadership of Novo Banco and was replaced in September 2014 by Eduardo Stock da Cunha.

The Resolution Fund was the bank's only shareholder until a sale transaction takes place. This fund was a structure created in 2012 with contributions from Portuguese banks and from the financial sector, and its operations are audited by the Portuguese regulator Banco de Portugal.

Novo Banco incorporates every staff, branch, deposits, credit customers and holders of senior bonds of Banco Espírito Santo.

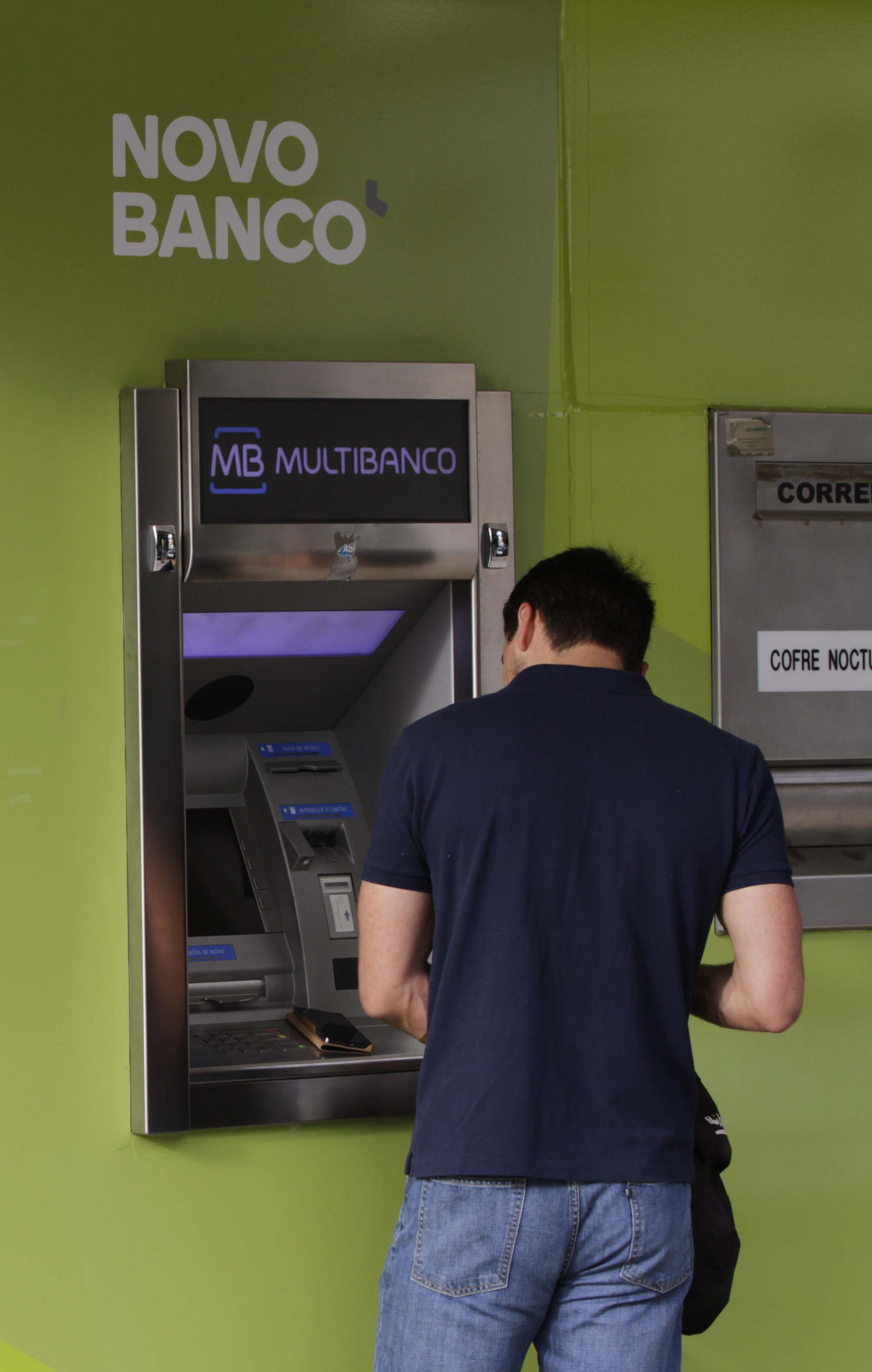
Novo Banco ATM, Lisbon

In August 2014 Novo Banco launched its first communication campaign, to mark the beginning of the change in the image of the bank. From the campaign, whose symbol was a butterfly, the bank launched its new identity on September 22, which incorporated the animal's wings in the shape of a mathematical power, as a way to symbolize the commitment to "have once more the leading role it once had". The change in the brand was made progressively, starting by the facades in the bank's branches.

On 30 June 2015, the Resolution Fund had received three binding bid offers on Novo Banco, from the Spanish banking group Banco Santander SA, the Chinese insurance group Fosun International Limited, the privately owned Chinese insurer Anbang Insurance, and the American private-equity firm Apollo Global Management. One of the bidders opted to improve their offer on 7 August 2015. The selection and sale to the final winner of the bidding process is expected to take place during Q3-2015. On 20 August, Banco de Portugal released a statement that the final phase of the sale process, was expected to conclude by 31 August. In September however the sale was cancelled owing to the offers being deemed unsatisfactory.

In March 2016, it was announced that Novo Banco was planning to cut 1,000 jobs to help to reduce operating costs by 150 million euros ($163 million) as part of its restructuring plan agreed with the European Union. The proposed job cuts equated to 14 percent of the bank's workforce at the time.

In October 2016, the resolution fund had received four offers on Novo Banco from China's Minsheng Financial Holding, Apollo and Centerbridge and Lone Star Funds. In January 2017, Aethel Partners headed by Ricardo Santos Silva made an offer to buy Novo Banco.

In April 2017, a consortium led by Well Link Financial Group acquired the unit from Portugal's Novo Banco for MOP 1.5 billion (approximately EUR 175 million).. The bank was officially renamed as Well Link Bank in October of the same year.

In 2017, the American fund Lone Star Funds acquired 75% of the share capital of Novobanco in return for a capital injection of €1bn, with the Portuguese Resolution Fund holding the remaining 25%.

As part of this sale, the European Commission, through the Directorate-General for Competition (DGComp), imposed a series of commitments and measures aimed at ensuring that the sale took place in accordance with competition rules and that the Portuguese state did not provide preferential treatment to the institution, namely the sale of non-core assets and the limitation of toxic assets on the balance sheet.

From this date onwards, Novobanco entered a phase of restructuring both in terms of its operations and cleaning up its balance sheet and concentrating on its core business of commercial banking dedicated to private and corporate clients in the domestic market. The bank's operations were restructured and the balance sheet was cleaned up.

From 2017 to 2022, Novobanco implemented an ambitious restructuring plan that focused on key areas such as asset quality improvement, cost reduction, operational efficiency and strategic realignment.

The bank took steps to reduce its non-performing loan portfolio from 12.3% of the net NPL ratio in 2017 to 0.2% in 2025, including implementing strict risk management practices, strengthening internal controls and creating specialised recovery units.

In addition, the new bank streamlined its operations, including divesting its international activity to focus entirely on Portugal, and optimised its cost structure, with Cost to Commercial Banking Income ("C/I") decreasing from 75.4% in 2017 to 34.9% in 2025.

In 2022, Novobanco launched a rebranding. The bank also reported that it held a solid balance sheet and robust capital ratios and was investing heavily in renewing its commercial network.

In 2023, Novobanco was awarded "Bank of the Year in Portugal" by The Banker, a publication within the Financial Times Group.

In August 2023, Novo Banco was ordered to return $1.5 billion worth of frozen assets to the Venezuelan government.

In December 2024, Novo Banco closed the asset protection scheme (Contingent Capital Agreement) which it has received as part of the acquisition by Lone Star in October 2017 ahead of its contractual maturity in December 2025. On the back of this early termination which lifts a contractual dividend ban, the bank announced plans to normalize its capital structure and is targeting an initial public offering in 2025.

In June 2025, French bank BPCE acquired Lone Star's 75% stake in Novo Banco, valuing 100% of the bank for 6.4 billion euros. On 29 October 2025, BPCE signed an agreement with the Portuguese government to buy the remaining 25% stake of Novo Banco for 1.6 billion euros and therefore acquire 100% of Novobanco's capital.

== Activity and services ==
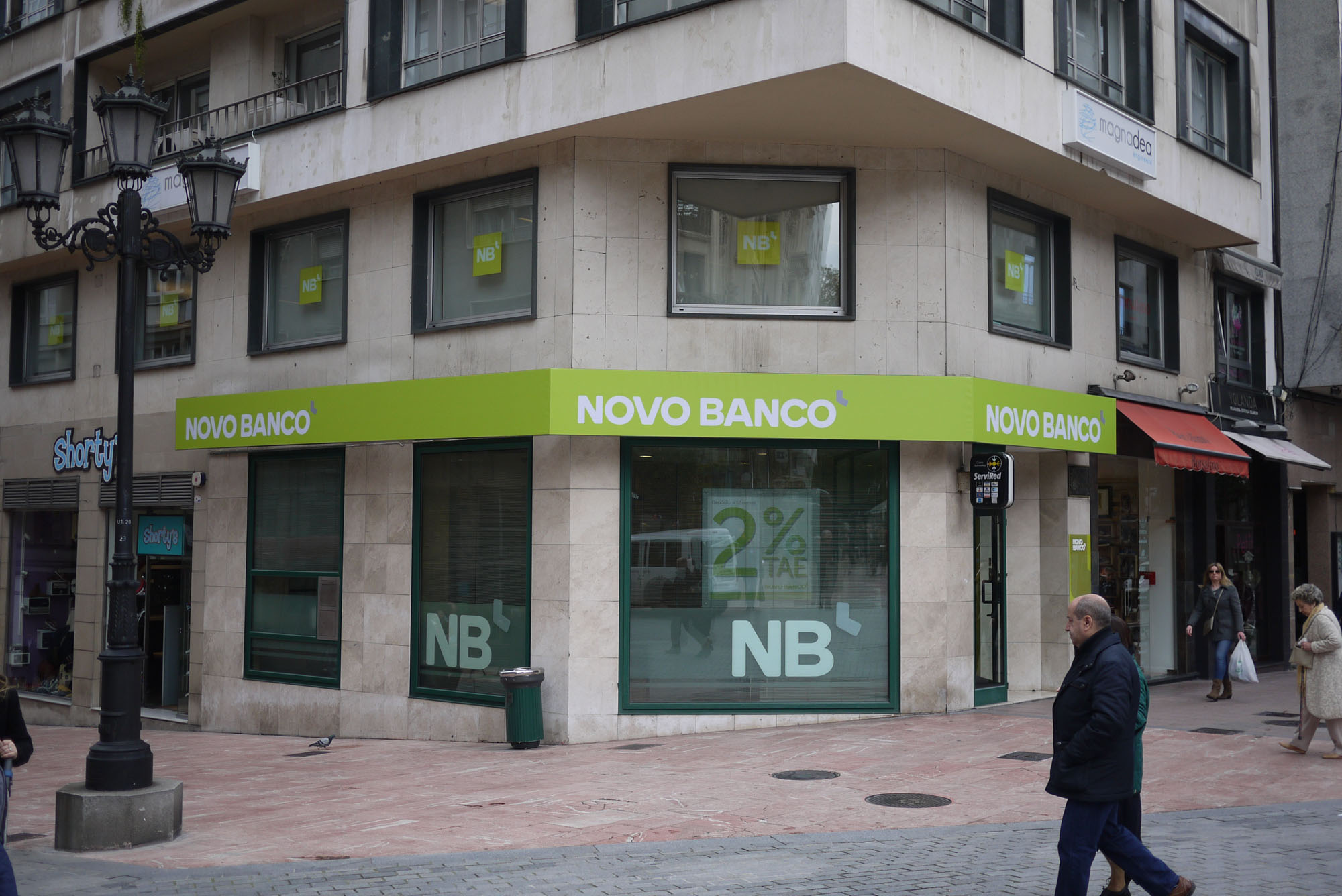
Novo Banco branch

Currently, Novobanco is the 4th largest bank operating in the national market, with 1.7 million customers, assets of 46.4 billion euros and a 9.2% market share in 2025. It operates with a business model centred on domestic commercial banking for companies and individuals.

In 2025, Novobanco's commercial network had 289 branches covering the entire national territory. Its business model is centered on domestic commercial banking and corporate and individual banking, offering the full spectrum of financial products to individuals, companies and institutional clients.

== See also ==
- Banco Best
- List of banks in the euro area
- List of banks in Portugal
